= All Creatures of Our God and King =

1919 English hymn by William Henry Draper

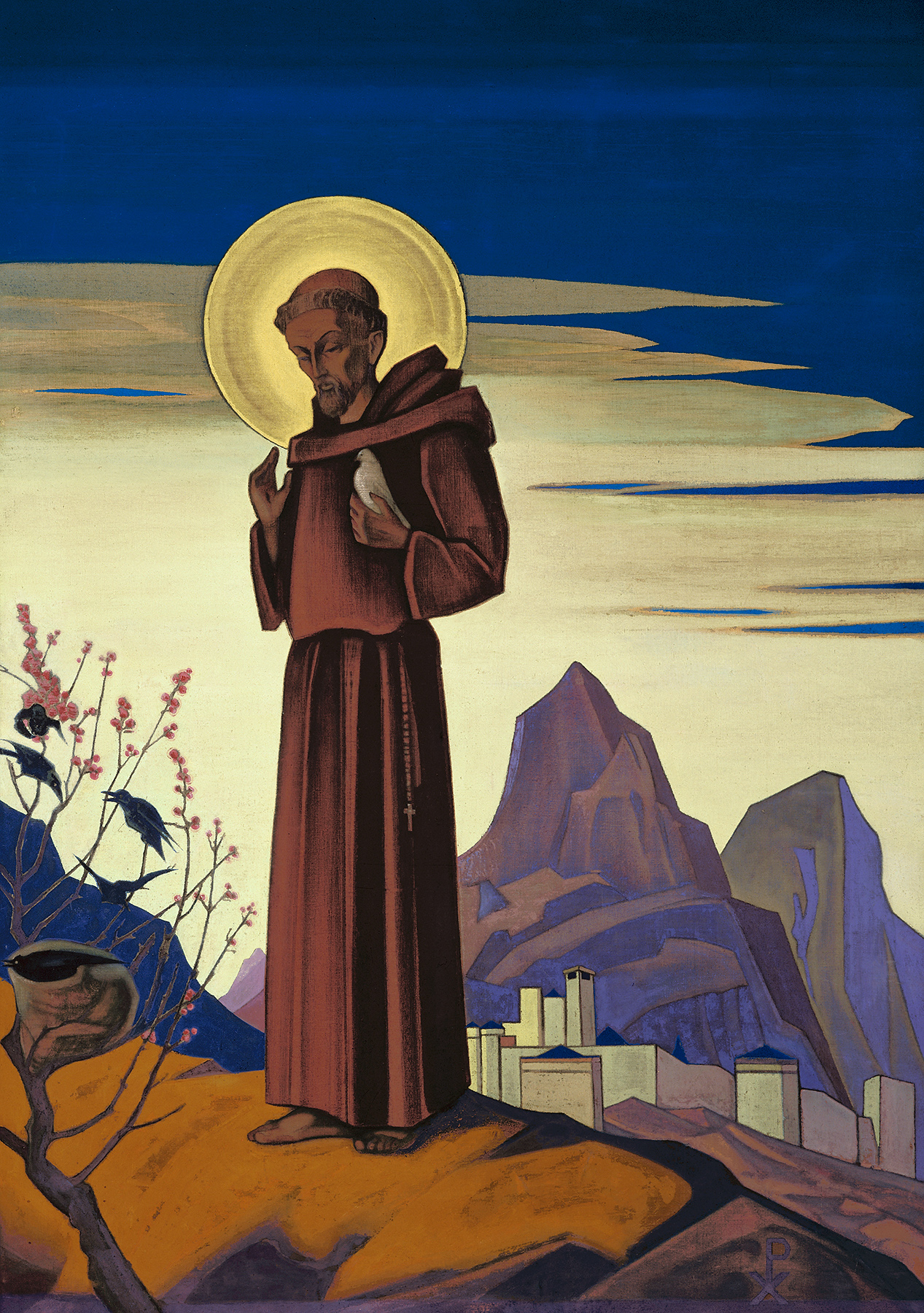
- St. Francis
- Genre: Hymn
- Written: 1225
- Text: St. Francis of Assisi
- Based on: Psalms 148
- Meter: 8.8.4.4.8.8 with refrain
- Melody: "Lasst uns erfreuen"

"All Creatures of Our God and King" is an English Christian hymn by William Henry Draper, based on a poem by St. Francis of Assisi. It was first published in a hymn book in 1919.

== History ==
The words of the hymn were initially written by St. Francis of Assisi in 1225 in the Canticle of the Sun poem, which was based on Psalm 148. The words were translated into English by William Draper, who at the time was rector of a Church of England parish church at Adel near Leeds. Draper paraphrased the words of the Canticle and set them to music. It is not known when Draper first wrote the hymn but it was between 1899 and 1919. Draper wrote it for his church's children's Whitsun festival celebrations and it was later published in 1919 in the Public School Hymn Book. As of 2025, it is known to be used in 270 different hymn books. The words written by St Francis are some of the oldest used in hymns after "Father We Praise Thee", written in 580 AD.

Like "Ye Watchers and Ye Holy Ones", Draper's text is usually set to the tune of "Lasst uns erfreuen", a German Easter hymn published by Friedrich Spee in 1623 in his book Auserlesene Catholische Geistliche Kirchengesäng. This tune became widespread in English hymn books starting with a 1906 arrangement by Ralph Vaughan Williams. John Rutter also wrote a piece of music for the hymn. Despite the hymn being initially written by Draper for Whitsun (the Anglican and English designation for Pentecost), it is mostly used in the earlier weeks of the Easter season.

== Melody ==
The most common melody is the 1623 German hymn tune Lasst uns erfreuen. The following setting is from the 1906 English Hymnal, with the lyrics quoted from the 1986 New English Hymnal:

== In popular culture ==
The hymn is prominently featured in the pilot episode of the comedy programme Mr. Bean, where the title character is in church when the congregation sings "All Creatures of Our God and King", but he has no hymnal. Consequently, he mumbles through most of the song, save for the recurrent "Alleluia", which he sings as loudly as possible.

In the United States, it was covered by the David Crowder Band on the album Can You Hear Us? in 2002 and in the album Illuminate in 2003.

Most recently used in Pressure 2026 film - clever use of words and meteology in parallel.
