= Lasst uns erfreuen =

1623 hymn tune

- German hymn tune
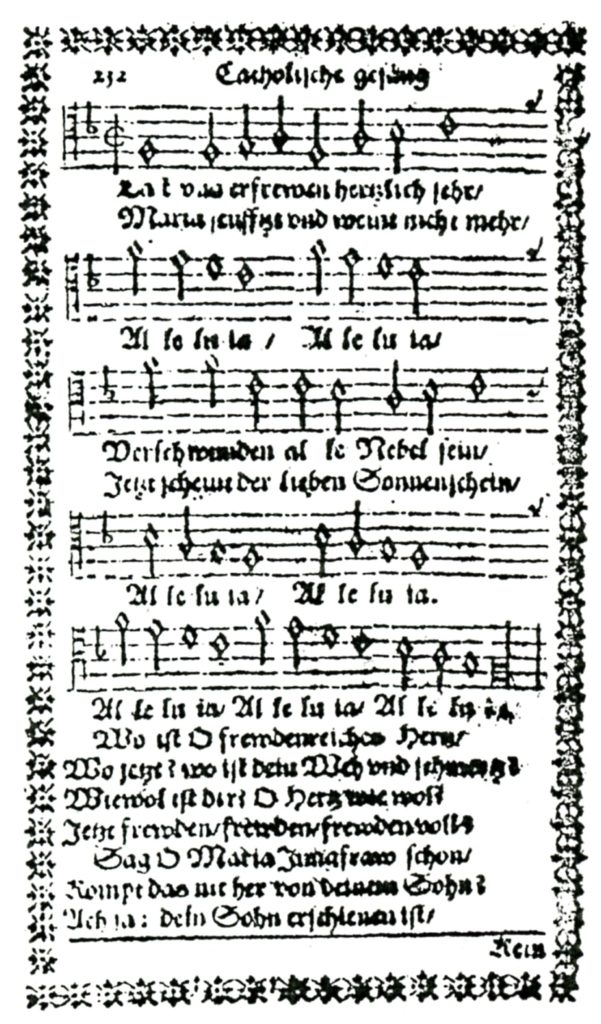
- Copy dated 1625
- English: Let us rejoice
- Meter: 88.88 with Alleluias
- Published: Cologne, 1623
- Original 1623 placement of the "Alleluia" phrases

"Lasst uns erfreuen herzlich sehr" (Let us rejoice most heartily) is a hymn tune that originated from Germany in 1623, and which found widespread popularity after The English Hymnal published a 1906 version in strong triple meter with new lyrics. The triumphant melody and repeated "Alleluia" phrases have supported the tune's widespread usage during the Easter season and other festive occasions, especially with the English texts "Ye Watchers and Ye Holy Ones" and "All Creatures of Our God and King". ''Lasst uns erfreuen'' derives its opening line and several other melodic ideas from GENEVAN 68, which was initially published in a Lutheran service in 1525 as a setting for Psalm 119.

The tune's first known appearance was in the 1623 hymnal Auserlesene, Catholische, Geistliche Kirchengesäng (Selected Catholic Spiritual Church-Songs) during the Counter-Reformation and the Thirty Years' War. The original 1623 hymnal was published anonymously, but is believed to have been authored by Friedrich Spee, an influential Jesuit priest, professor, and polemicist against witch-hunts, who is often credited as the hymn's original lyricist. The English Hymnal of 1906 was edited by Ralph Vaughan Williams, whose arrangement of the hymn has become the standard for English-speaking churches.

== Melody ==
In its original 1623 publication, "Lasst uns erfreuen" consisted of four eight-note text phrases, each immediately followed by a four-note Alleluia phrase, all of which was followed by the final triple-Alleluia refrain. In a 1625 collection, the hymn was restructured so that before the final refrain the eight-note text phrases occur in two pairs. The 1623 sequence is still common in German-language Catholic hymnals, while the 1625 version is more usual in English-language hymnals.

The verse consists of two repeated musical phrases with matching rhythms ("V", "v"), one using the upper pitches of the major scale and one using the lower pitches, and likewise for the Alleluia refrain ("R", "r"). Schematically, the structure of the original 1623 version can be represented as "vRvR VrVr RRr", and the revised 1625 sequence is "vvRR VVrr RRr", the tune thus achieving a "full and satisfying effect [built] with rare musical economy".

== Hymn texts ==
Below is the first verse from the original German (the 1625 publication, excluding the Alleluias), alongside a half-rhymed, line-by-line English translation that shares the same 88.88 "long meter":

Last uns erfrewen hertzlich sehr.
Maria seufftzt und weint nicht mehr.
Verschwunden alle Nebel sein.
Jetzt scheint der lieben Sonnenschein.

Translation:

Let us most heartily rejoice.
Maria sighs and weeps no more.
All hazes now must disappear.
The lovely shining sun now gleams.

The original hymn still appears in the main German-language Catholic hymnal Gotteslob, with slightly modernized text, and the tune as well in the Protestant Evangelisches Gesangbuch (Nr. 514) with a translation by Karl Budde (1929) of Draper's "All Creatures".

Especially since the early 1900s, versions of the tune have been used for many denominations, languages, and hymn texts. Some of these alternate texts are particularly notable, including alphabetically:

- "All Creatures of Our God and King", a paraphrase of Canticle of the Sun – by William Henry Draper, in 1919.
  - Adapted for festival choir, brass, percussion and organ – by John Rutter, published 1974.
- "Creator Spirit, by Whose Aid", a paraphrase of Veni Creator Spiritus – by John Dryden, published 1693.
- "Praise God, from whom all blessings flow", the Common Doxology – by Thomas Ken, written 1674.
- "Sing Hallelujah! Praise the LORD!", an adaptation of Psalm 150 – published in the Trinity Psalter Hymnal (Presbyterian) in 2018.
- "Ye Watchers and Ye Holy Ones", or Vigiles et Sancti in Latin – by Athelstan Riley, in a musical arrangement by Ralph Vaughan Williams, published in The English Hymnal in 1906.
  - Adapted for the final movement of The Company of Heaven, a cantata – by Benjamin Britten, composed and published in 1937.
