= List of former Total Nonstop Action Wrestling personnel (S–Z) =

Total Nonstop Action Wrestling is a professional wrestling company based in Nashville, Tennessee. Former employees (family name letters S–Z) in TNA consist of professional wrestlers, managers, play-by-play and color commentators, announcers, interviewers, referees, trainers, script writers, executives, and board of directors. In the case of wrestlers originating from Spanish-speaking countries, who most often have two surnames, the paternal (first) surname is used.

TNA talent contracts range from developmental contracts to multi-year deals. They primarily appeared on TNA television programming, pay-per-views, monthly specials, and live events, and talent with developmental contracts appeared at Border City Wrestling and Ohio Valley Wrestling. When talent is released of their contract, it could be for a budget cut, the individual asking for their release, for personal reasons, time off from an injury, or retirement.

Those who made appearances without a contract and those who were previously released but are currently employed by TNA are not included.

== Alumni (S–Z) ==
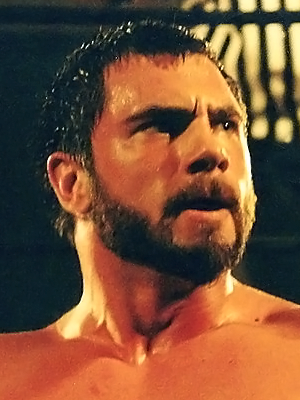
Austin Aries

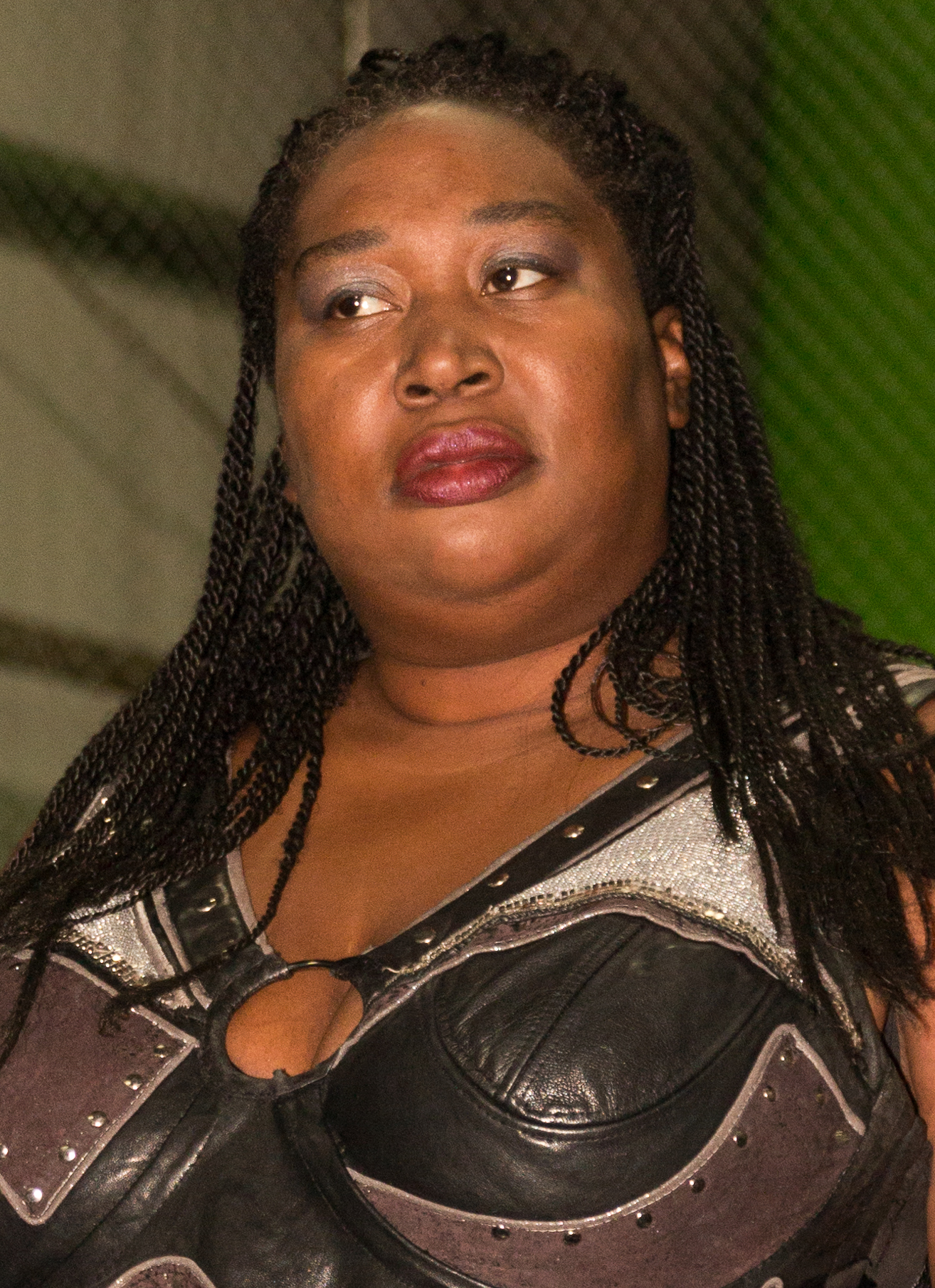
Awesome Kong

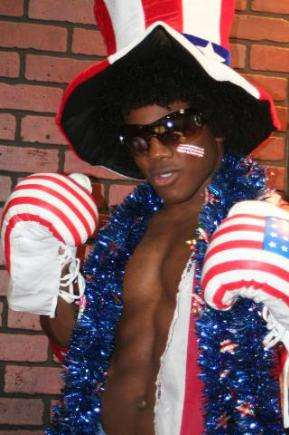
Consequences Creed

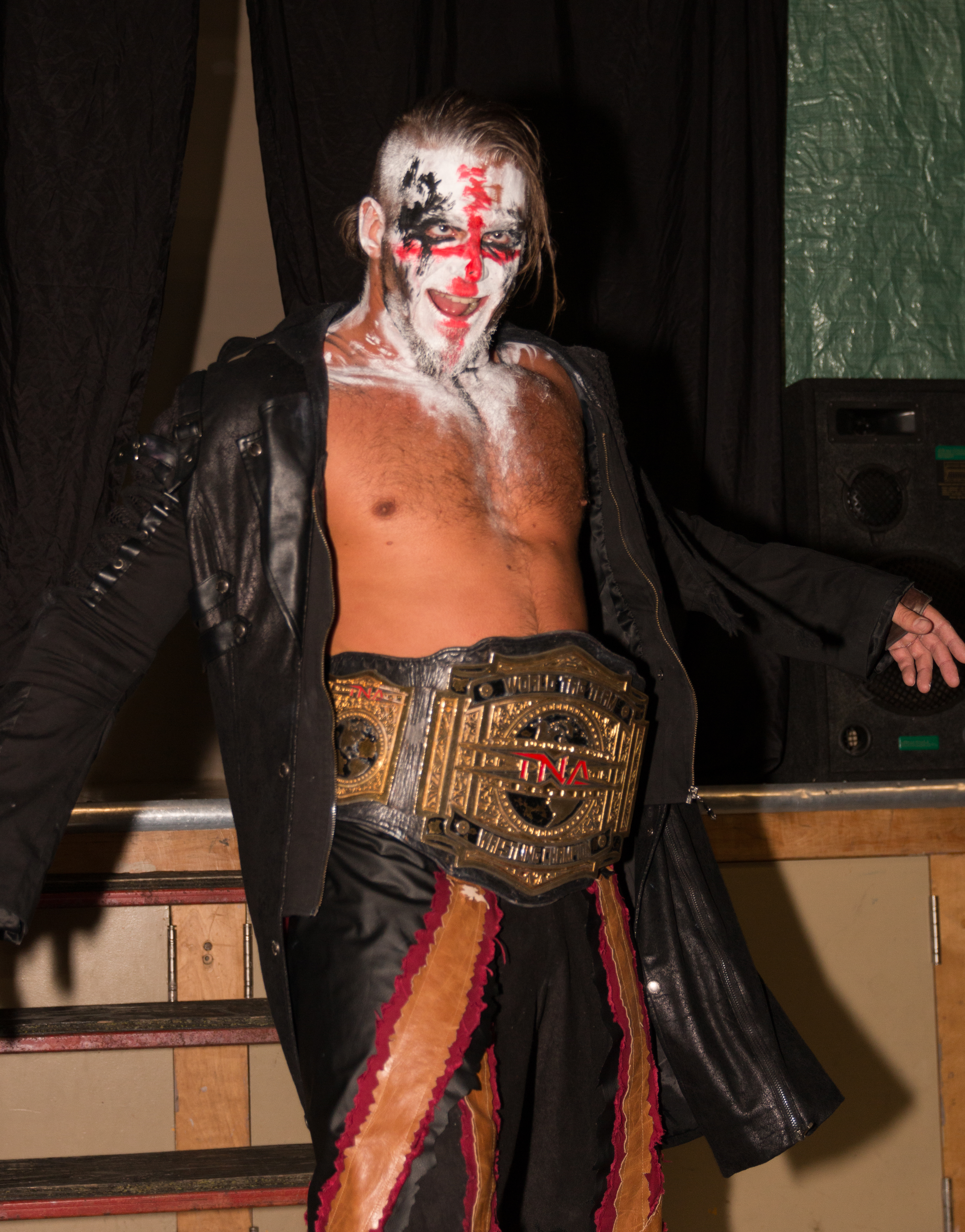
Crazzy Steve

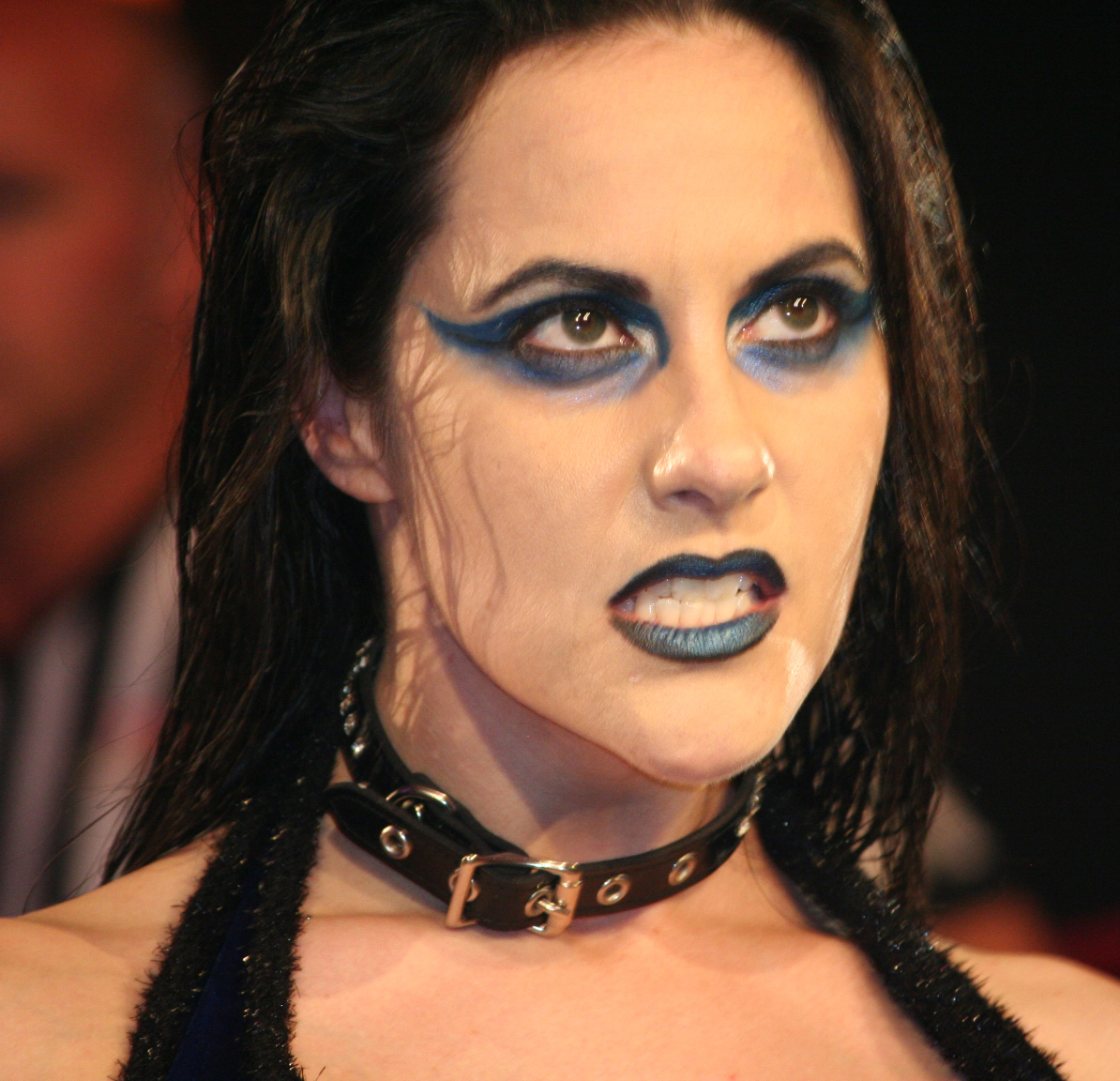
Daffney

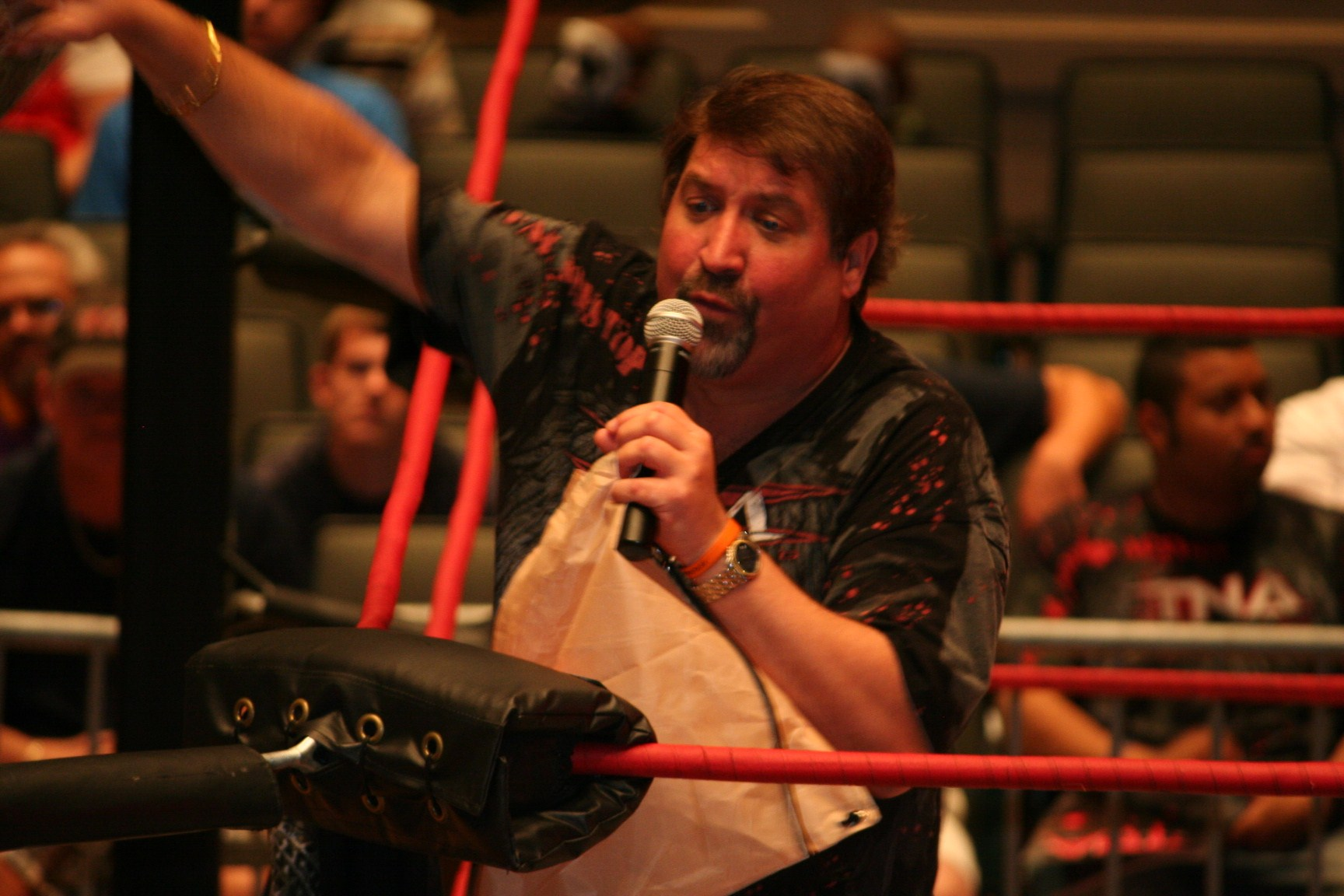
Don West

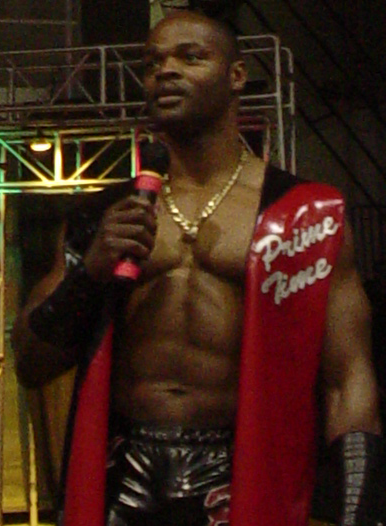
Elix Skipper

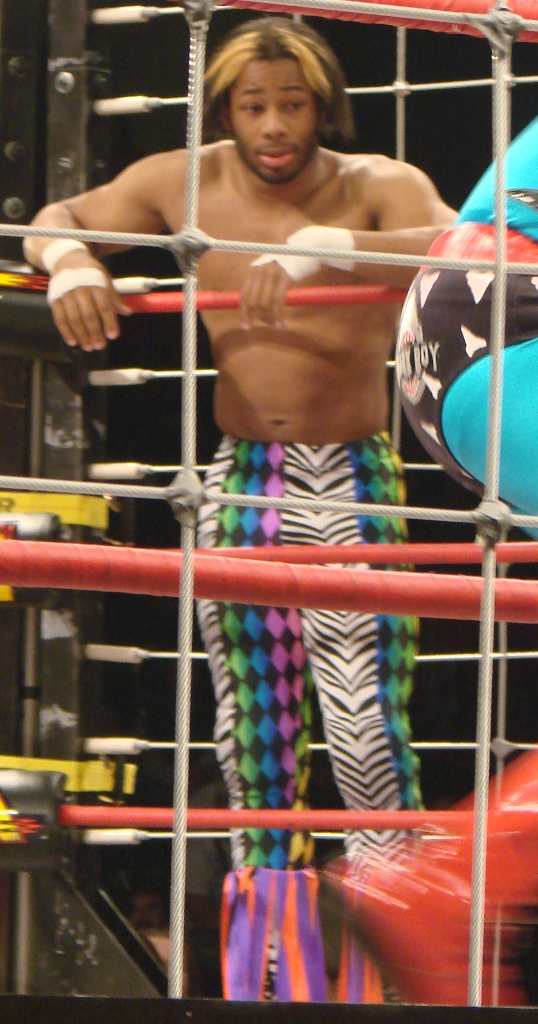
Jay Lethal

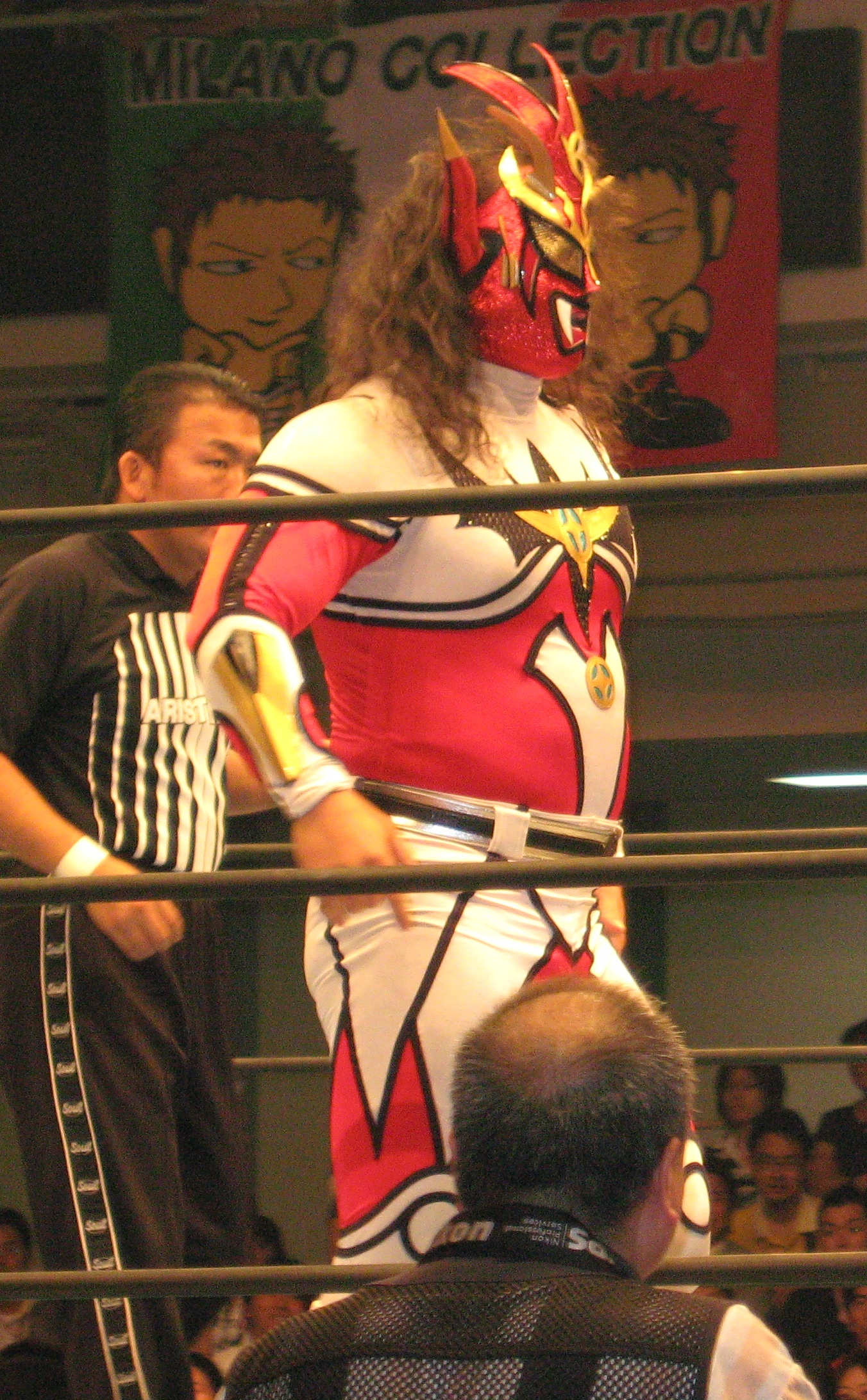
Jushin Thunder Liger

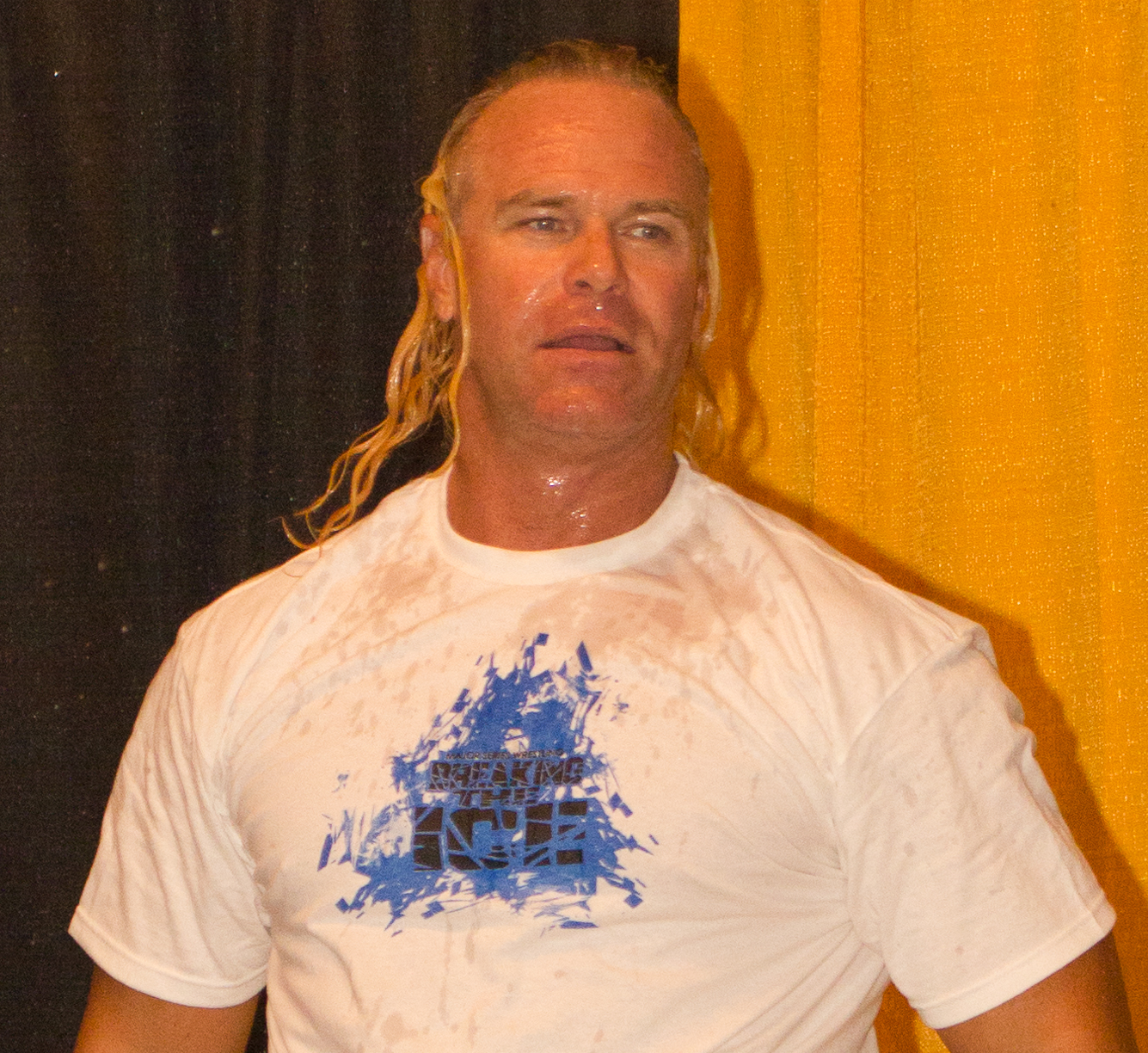
Kip James

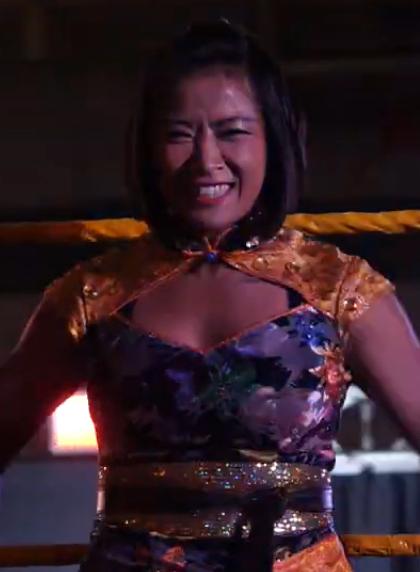
Lei Ying Lee

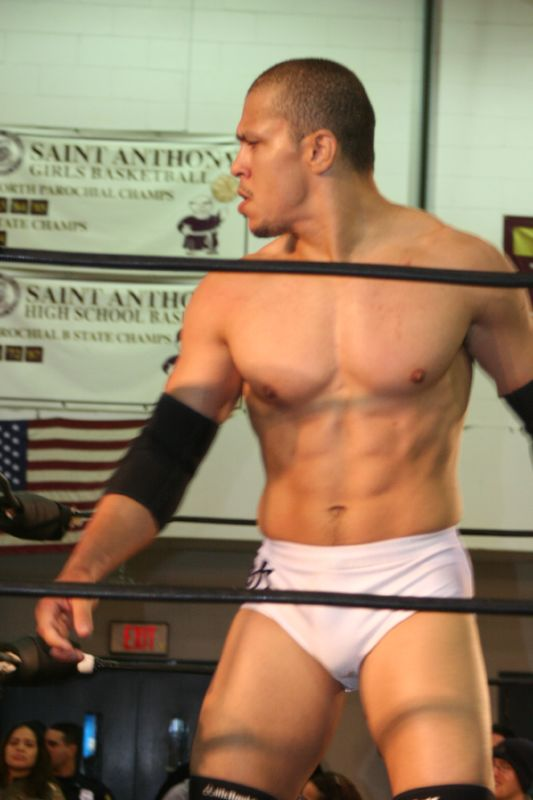
Low Ki

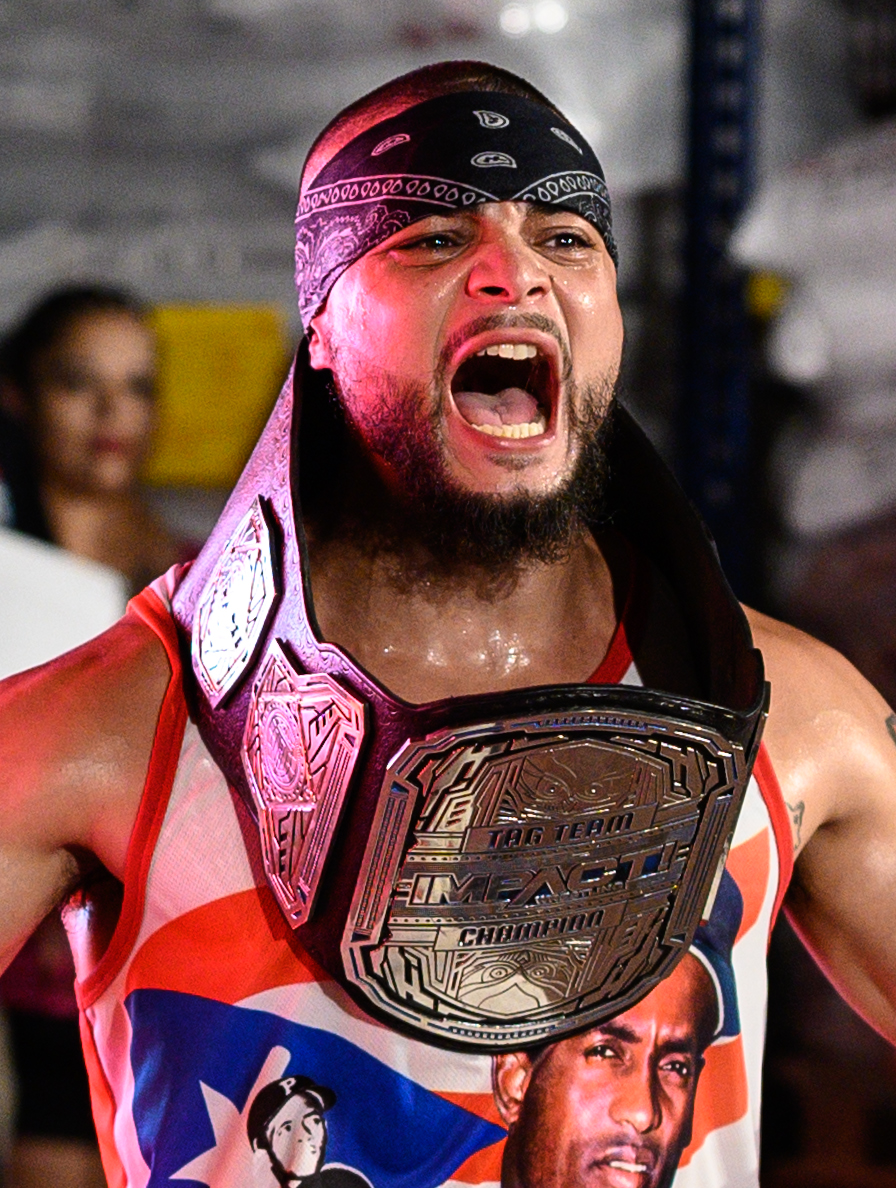
Mike Santana

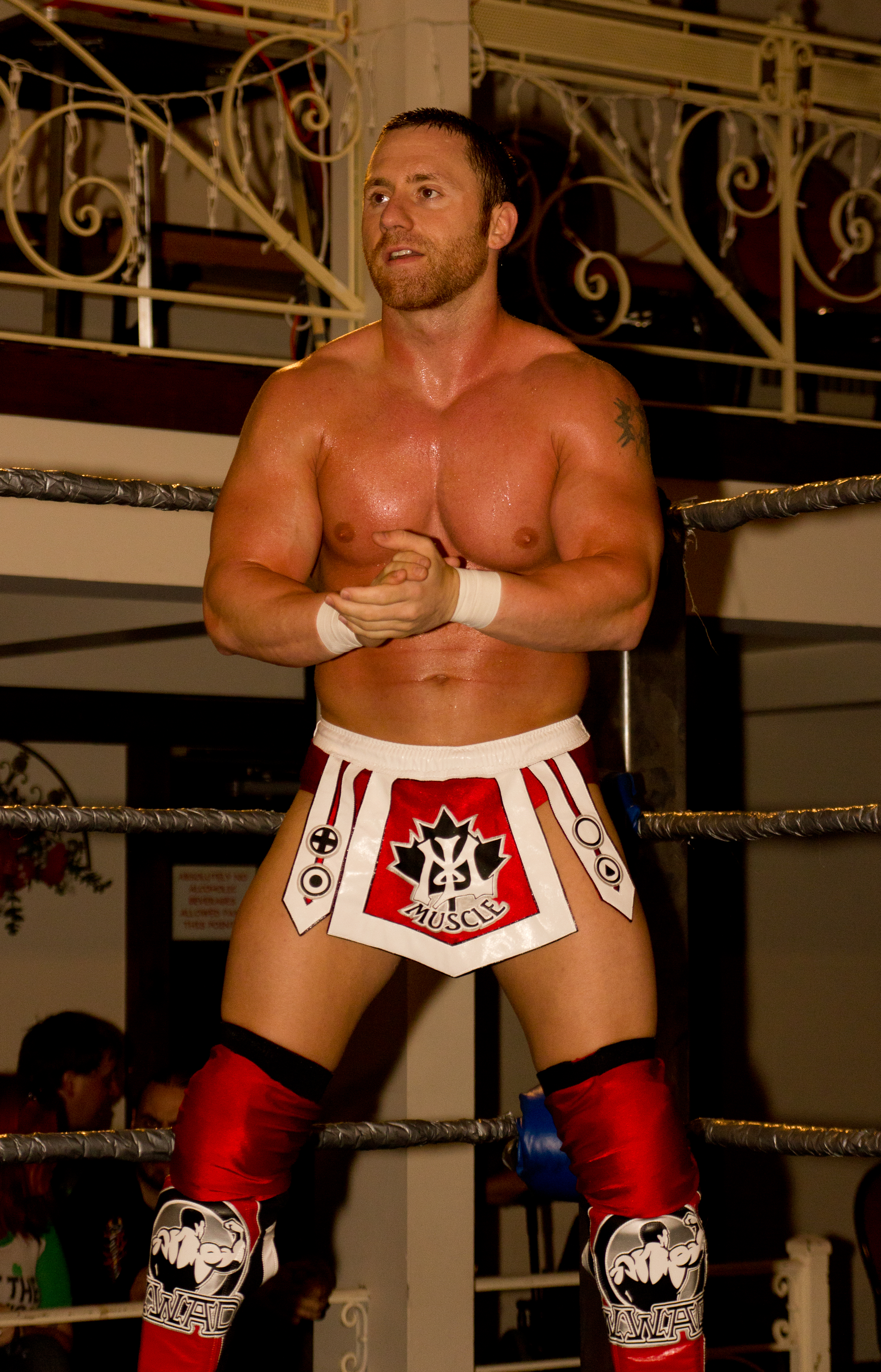
Petey Williams

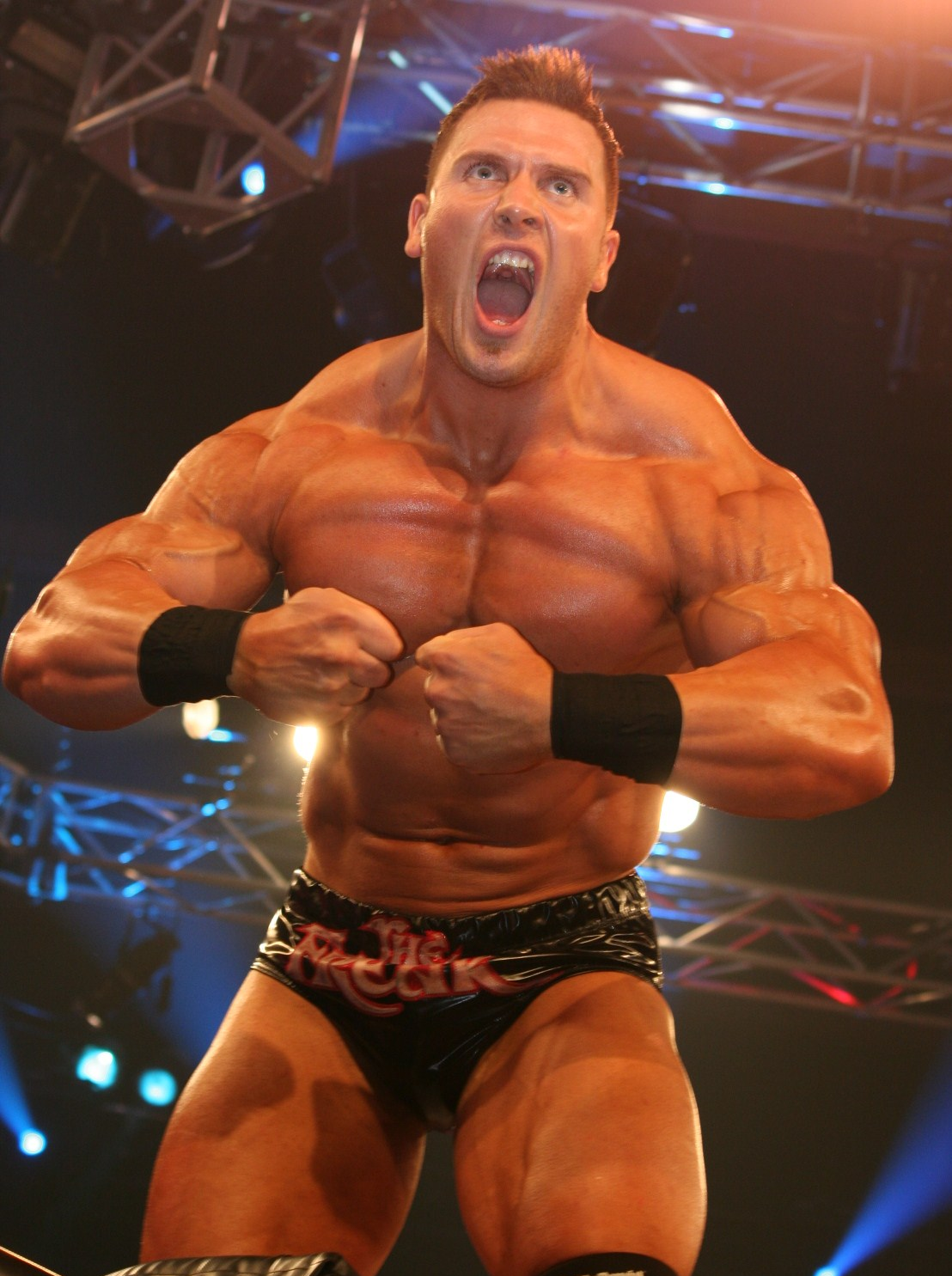
Rob Terry

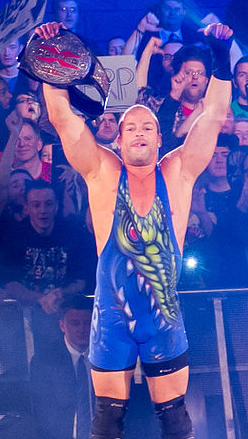
Rob Van Dam

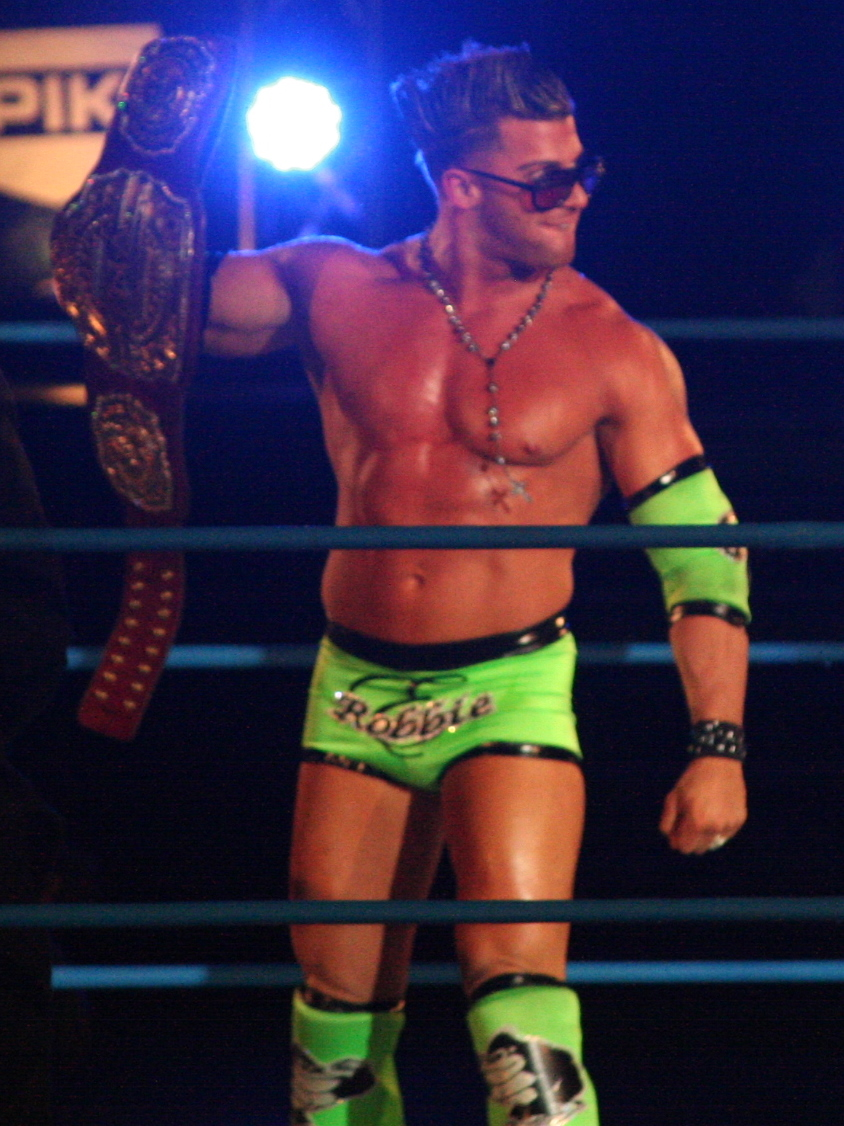
Robbie E

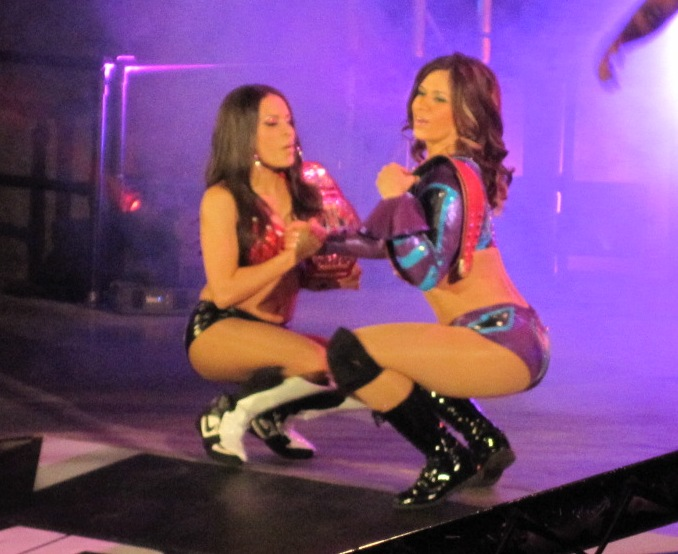
Rosita and Sarita

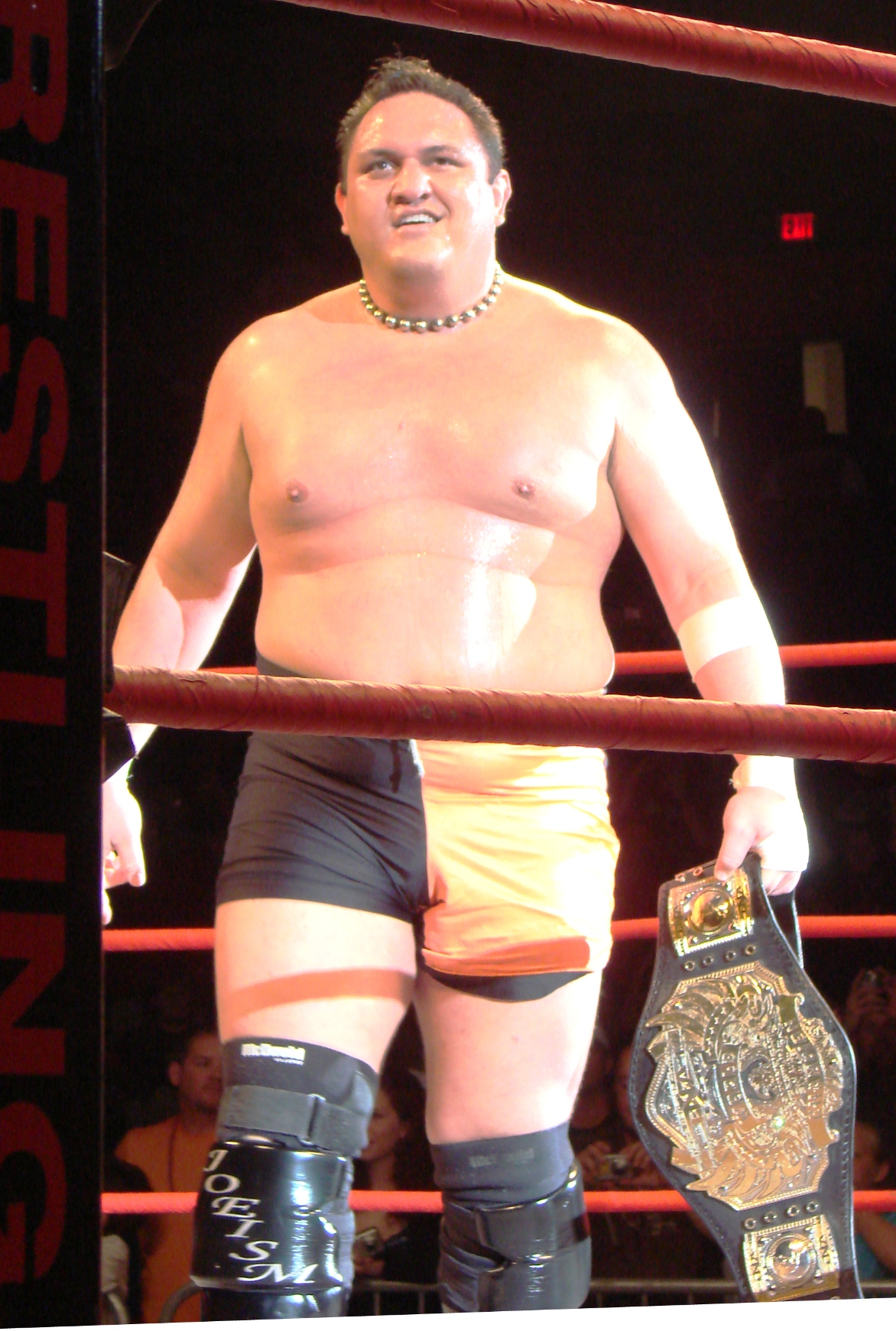
Samoa Joe

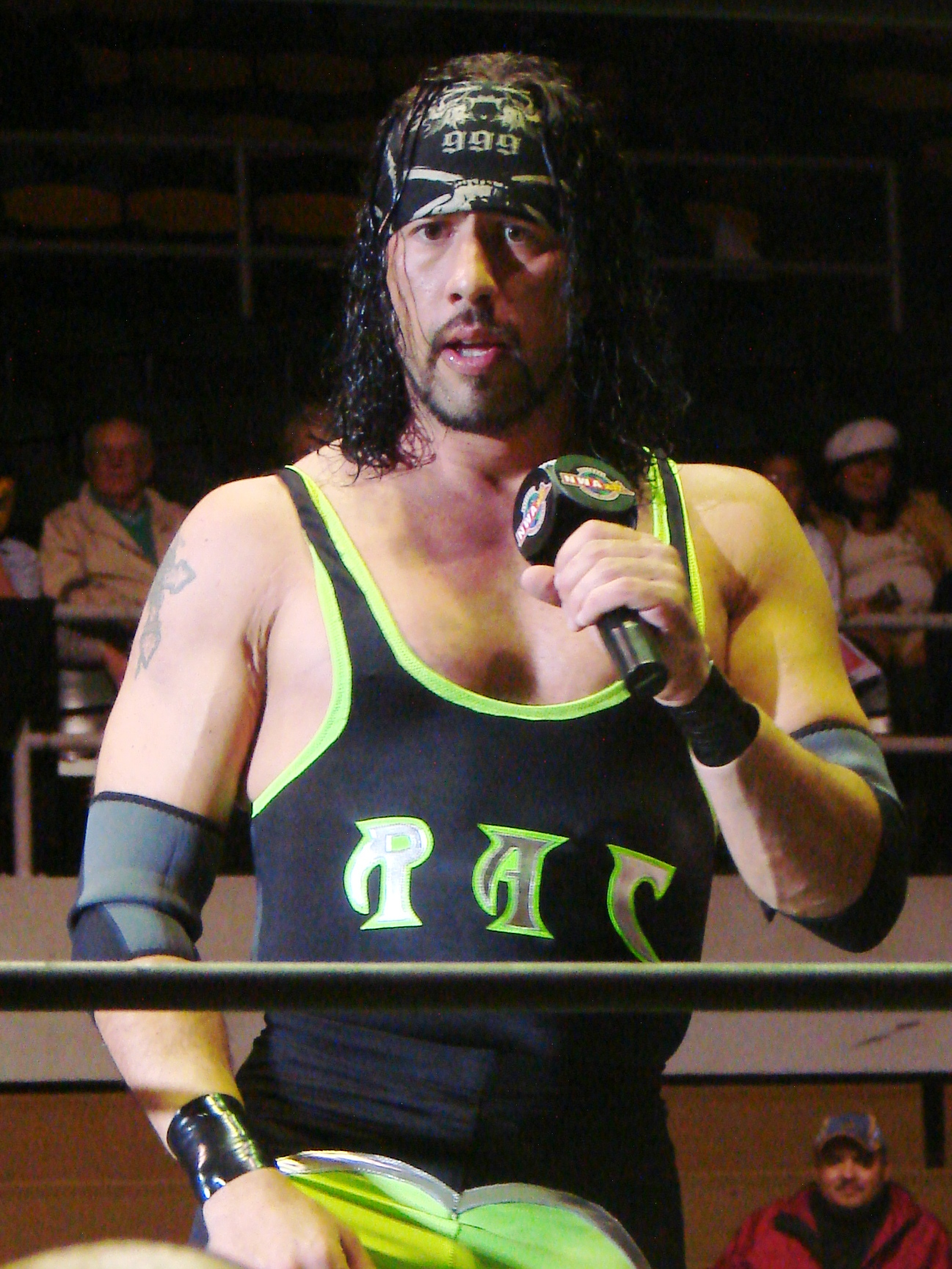
Sean Waltman

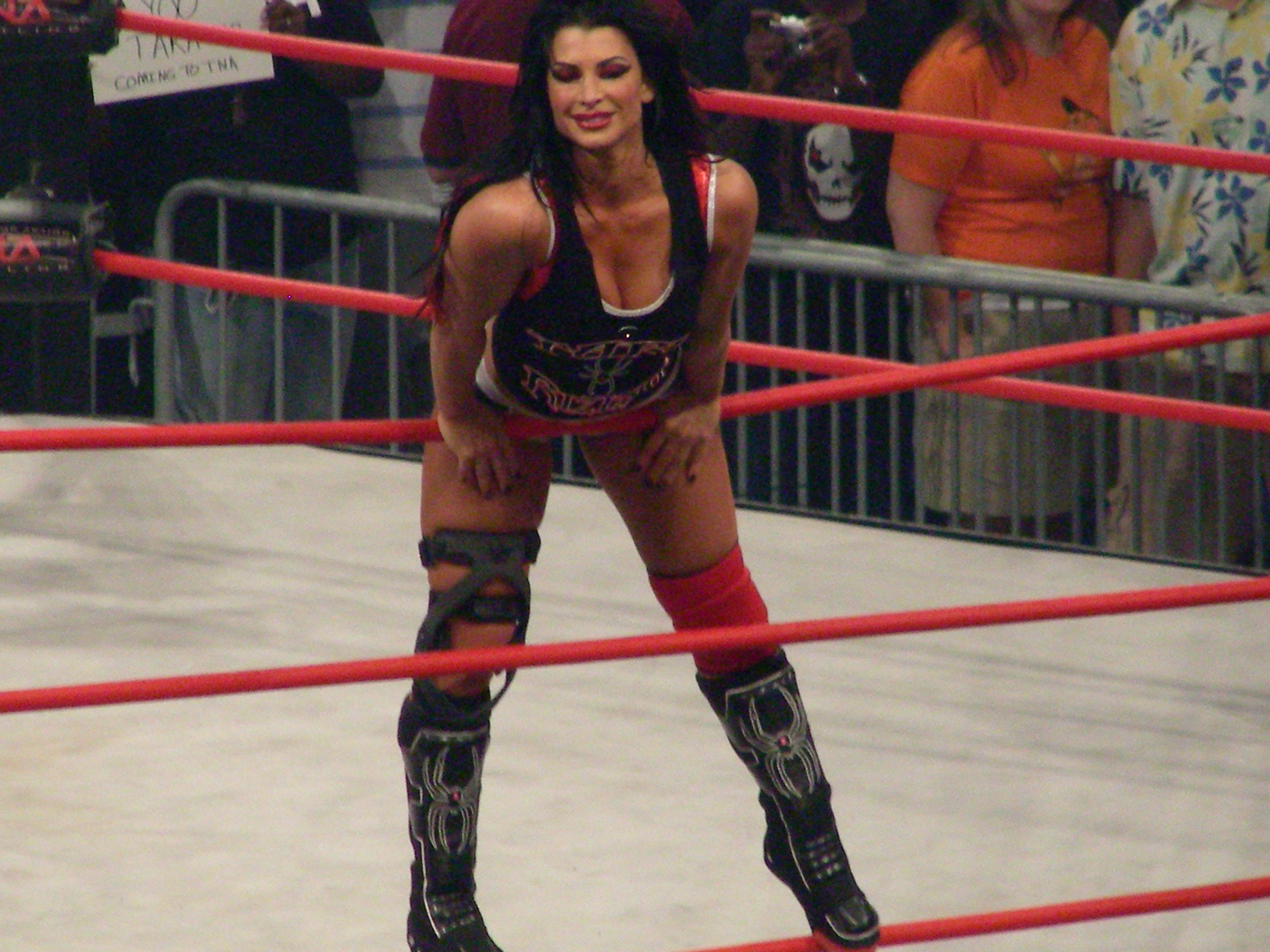
Tara

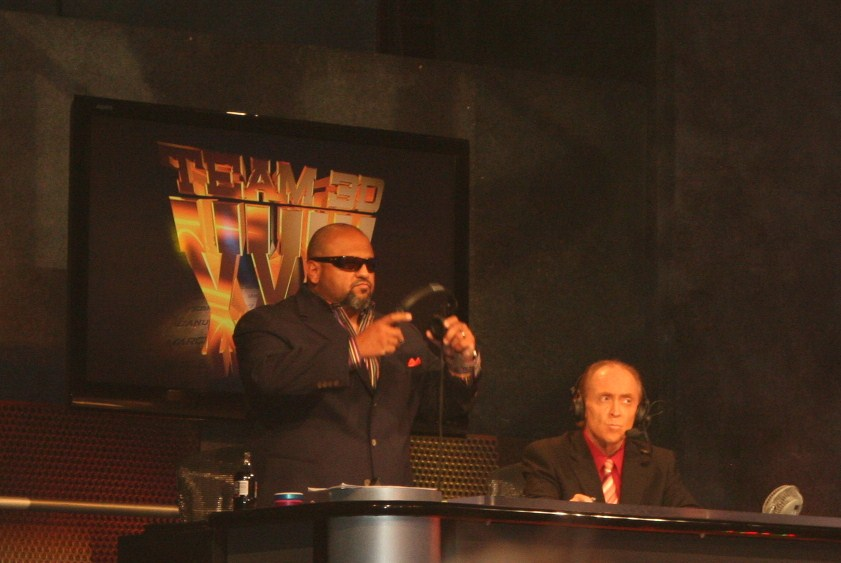
Taz and Mike Tenay

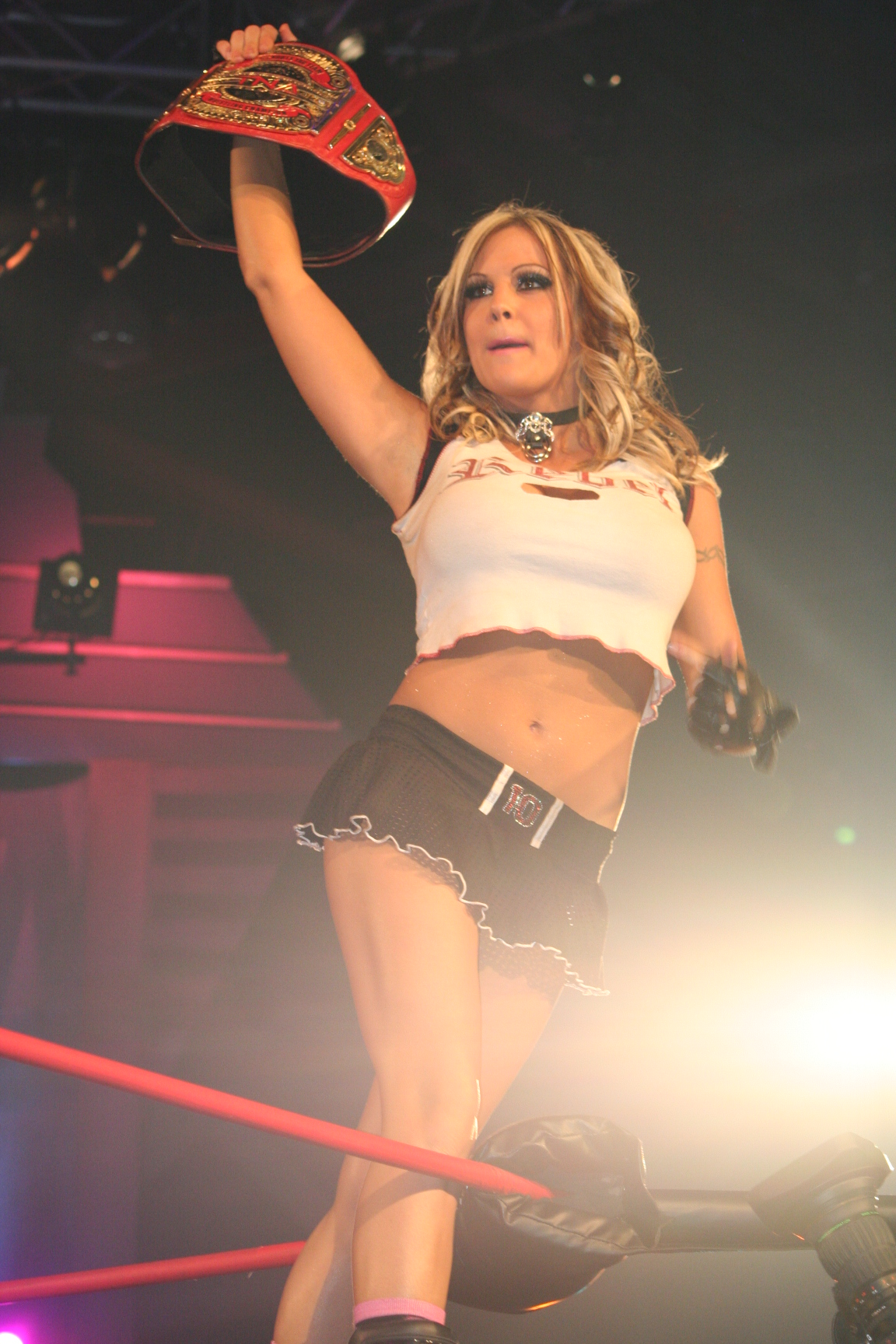
Velvet Sky

Birth name	Ring name(s)	Tenure	Ref
Unknown	Mascarita Sagrada	2004	
Unknown	Samir	2004	
Unknown	Sasha	2002	
Unknown	Sebastian	2003; 2004	
Unknown	Todd Sexton	2002–2003	
Unknown	Shaffee	2007	
Unknown	Slugga	2009	
Unknown	Ty Smiley	2004	
Unknown	Steele	2003	
Unknown	Thomas T. Stenenbaum; Tom	2004	
Unknown	Teddy Stigma	2010	
Unknown	Rip Stone	2003	
Unknown	Todd Stone	2002	
Unknown	Quiet Storm	2002	
Unknown	Sedrick Strong	2003; 2004	
Unknown	Tony Sweat	2003	
Unknown	Tank	2003	
Unknown	Tigre Uno	2013–2016	
Unknown	Tiny The Timekeeper	2002	
Unknown	Trendsetter	2003	
Unknown	Teresa Tyler	2002	
Unknown	Tyson	2004	
Unknown	Ricky Vandal	2003	
Unknown	Tommy Vandal	2003	
Unknown	Vex	2003	
Unknown	Scotty Wrenn	2003	
Unknown	Zero	2003	
Elliott Sadler	Elliott Sadler	2004	
Hermie Sadler	Hermie Sadler	2002; 2007; 2009; 2014–2017	
Jerome Saganovich	Jerry Sags; Sags	2010	
Anthony Salantri	Tony Stradlin	2002	
José Saldaña	Mr. Águila	2004	
Serg Salinas	Serg Salinas	2004–2017	
Seiya Sanada	Sanada; Seiya Sanada; The Great Sanada	2014–2015; 2023	
Mark Sanchez	Santana; Mike Santana	2016–2019; 2024–2026	
Mike Sanders	Mike Sanders	2003	
Bruno Sassi	Bruno Sassi; Sal; Sally Boy	2005; 2007; 2009–2010	
Perry Satullo	Perry Saturn	2003	
Akihito Sawafuji	Milano Collection A.T.	2008	
Charles Scaggs	Too Cold Scorpio	2010; 2013	
Vincent Scalice	VSK	2021–2022	
Tony Schiavone	Tony Schiavone	2003	
Barry Scott †	Barry Scott	2005–2020	
Steven Scott	Crazzy Steve	2014–2017; 2020–2024	
Veda Scott	Veda Scott	2014; 2016; 2021	
Christopher Scoville	Jimmy Jacobs	2004; 2006; 2017–2023	
Marty Scurll	Marty Scurll	2012–2013	
Jason Seguine	Buck Quartermain	2004–2006	
Nuufolau Seanoa	Samoa Joe	2005–2015	
Peter Senerchia	Taz	2009–2015	
Shane Sewell	Shane Sewell	2008–2009	
Patty Seymor	Leilani Kai	2003	
Sherri Schrull †	Sherri Martel	2006	
Moon Shadow	Goldy Locks	2002–2004	
Michael Shane	Richard Johnson	2002	
Todd Shane	Rod Johnson	2002	
Sheri Shaw	Sstaria	2010–2015	
Jessica Shaw	Jessica James	2007	
Benjamin Sheinberg	Benjamin Sheinberg	2019–2020	
Alex Sherman	Alex Koslov	2008	
Nigel Sherrod	Elvis	2008	
James Sherwood	Spyder	2003	
Jamar Shipman	Jay Lethal; Black Machismo	2005–2011	
Mohammed Shipman	Mohammed	2010	
Sonny Siaki	Sonny Siaki	2002–2005	
William Sierra	Bill Alfonso	2010	
Brandon Silvestry	Low Ki; Senshi	2002–2004; 2006–2008; 2011; 2014–2015; 2017	
Alison Skipper	Chelsea	2010	
Elix Skipper	Elix Skipper; Primetime	2002–2008	
John Slaughter	Johnny Slaughter	2002–2003	
Frankie Sloan	Frankie Sloan	2004	
Norman Smiley	Norman Smiley	2002–2003; 2006–2007	
Aurelian Smith, Jr.	Jake Roberts	2006; 2008	
Tracy Smothers †	Tracy Smothers	2010	
Chloe Smyth	Dani Luna	2023–2026	
Eugene Snitsky	Snitsky	2014	
Héctor Solano †	Héctor Garza	2004–2005	
Daniel Solwold Jr.	Austin Aries; Austin Starr	2005–2007; 2011–2015; 2018	
Monty Sopp	The New Age Outlaw; The Outlaw; Kip James; Cute Kip	2005–2009	
Jesse Sorensen	Jesse Sorensen	2011–2013	
Jason Spence	Christian York	2002; 2012–2013	
Charles Spencer	Tony Mamaluke; Tony Luke	2002–2003; 2010	
Chris Spradlin	Chris Hero	2003–2004	
Shannon Spruill †	Daffney; Shannon; Sarah Palin; The Governor; Shark Girl	2002; 2003; 2008–2011	
John Stagikas	John Walters	2003	
Mike Staples	Cheex	2002	
Brittany Rae Steding	Lady Frost	2021–2022	
Jared Steele	Jared Steele	2003; 2004	
Rycklon Stephens	Rycklon	2014	
Chase Stevens	Chase Stevens	2002–2007; 2013	
Erick Stevens	Erick Stevens	2004	
Kia Stevens	Amazing Kong; Awesome Kong	2007–2010; 2015–2016	
Mark Stevens	Mark Stevens; Scott Hotshot	2004	
Veronica Stevens	Nurse Veronica; Simply Luscious	2003	
Steven Stewart	Steven Stewart	2004	
Dennis Stewart	Derek Wylde	2002	
Sarah Stock	Sarita	2009–2013	
Robert Strauss	Robbie E	2010–2017	
Kevin Sullivan †	Kevin Sullivan	2003; 2019	
Sharmell Sullivan-Huffman	Sharmell	2007–2009	
Kenzo Suzuki	Kenzo Suzuki	2003	
Tammy Lynn Sytch	Tammy Sytch	2005	
Jamie Szantyr	Velvet Sky	2007-2012; 2012–2016	
Robert Szatkowski	Rob Van Dam	2010–2013; 2019–2020	
Yujiro Takahashi	Yujiro	2009	
Hiroshi Tanahashi	Hiroshi Tanahashi	2006; 2008	
Minoru Tanaka	Minoru Tanaka	2006	
Adolfo Tapia	L.A. Park; La Parka	2004	
Charles Taylor	Chaz Taylor	2004	
Darnell Taylor	Apollo Kahn	2004	
Dave Taylor	Dave Taylor	2004; 2010	
Derrick Taylor	Derrick King	2002	
Paul Taylor III	Terry Taylor	2003–2011	
Michael Tenay	Mike Tenay	2002–2016	
Robert Terry	Rob Terry; Big Rob; Robbie T The Freak	2009–2015	
Alexa Thatcher	Alexa Jade	2007	
Andrew Thomas	Andrew Thomas	2004–2011	
Bradley Thomas	Jay Bradley; Aiden O'Shea	2013–2014; 2015–2017	
Brandon Thomas	Brandon Thomaselli	2006	
Vito Thomas	Vito Thomaselli	2004	
Lauren Thompson	Lauren	2007–2009	
Mark Thompson	John Saxon	2003; 2004	
James Tilquist	Big Tilly; Rocco; Big Rocco; Blue Tilly	2005; 2007; 2009–2010	
Travis Tomko	Tomko	2006–2008; 2009–2010	
Roderick Toombs †	Roddy Piper	2003–2005	
Dale Torborg	Dale Torborg; The Demon	2005; 2007; 2021	
Cliff Treiber	Cliff Compton	2003; 2012	
Rebecca Treston	Becky Bayless; Cookie	2008; 2010–2011	
Frank Trigg	Frank Trigg	2008; 2019	
Thea Trinidad	Divina Fly; Rosita	2011–2013	
Akinori Tsukioka	Kuishinbo Kamen	2004	
Jamie Tucker	Jamie Tucker	2009–2010	
Jerry Tuite †	Malice	2002	
Yuya Uemura	Yuya Uemura	2022–2023	
Willie Urbina	Willie Urbina	2007–2015	
Brian Urlacher	Brian Urlacher	2004	
Joseph Utsler	Shaggy 2 Dope	2003–2004; 2006; 2008	
Christopher Valenzuela	Don Juan	2003	
Levis Valenzuela Jr.	No Way	2021	
Lisa Marie Varon	Tara	2009–2013	
Andrew Vassos	Donovan Morgan	2006	
Christopher Vaughn	Chris Vaughn	2003; 2004	
Oscar Vazquez	Magno	2006; 2013	
Kyle Vanden Bosch	Kyle Vanden Bosch	2007; 2009	
Ricky Vega	Machete	2006–2007	
Ivelisse Vélez	Ivelisse Vélez	2012	
Dan Velten	Ryan Ash	2003	
Michael Verdi †	Trent Acid	2002	
Mikael Vierge	Baron Dax	2016	
Riley Vigier	El Phantasmo	2021; 2022	
Elizabeth Vocke	Nevaeh	2020–2021	
Edward Walker	Vordell Walker	2004	
Sean Waltman	Syxx-Pac; Sean Waltman	2002; 2003; 2005–2006; 2010	
Jessie Ward	Jessie Ward	2004–2007	
James Ware	Koko B. Ware	2008	
Andrew Warner	Scoot Andrews	2002	
Katarina Waters	Winter; Katarina	2010–2012; 2018–2019	
Austin Watson	Rasheed Lucius Creed; Consequences Creed	2007–2010	
James Watson	Mikey Whipwreck	2004	
Christopher P. Warren †	Chris Warren	2007–2008	
Erik Watts	Erik Watts; La Parka	2002–2005	
Alicia Webb	Aleesha	2002	
Nathan Webb	Nate Webb; Nate Spyder Webb; Spyder	2003–2004	
David Webber	Mortimer Plumtree	2002	
Robert Welch	Col. Robert Parker	2006	
Timothy Welch	Vince McMahon; Tim Welch; The Lawyer; Mr. Daggett	2004; 2005	
Andrew Wenkel	Andrew Everett	2015–2018; 2022	
Donald West †	Don West	2002–2012; 2017	
Lawrence Whistler	Larry Zbyszko	2003–2006	
Johnny Whitcombe	Jonny Storm	2003	
Leon White †	Vader	2003; 2015	
Kimberly Whitehead	Kimberly	2008	
Jason Whitehorn	Jason Gentry	2009–2013	
Benjamin Whitmer	B.J. Whitmore	2002–2003	
Brian Wickens	Uncle Leo	2007	
Craig Williams	Human Tornado	2006	
Peter Williams III	Petey Williams	2004–2009; 2013–2014; 2017–2021	
Travis Williams	Travis Williams	2024–2026	
Ryan Wilson	Ryan Wilson; Titus; Trytan	2003–2005	
Steven Wilson	Kongo Kong	2017–2019	
Brian Wohl	Julio Dinero	2003–2004	
Gary Wolfe	Gary Wolfe	2003	
Kelly Wolfe	Wolfie D Slash	2002–2004; 2013	
Melissa Wolfram	Melissa Wolfram	2008	
Christopher Wright	C. W. Anderson	2004; 2010	
Frank Wycheck †	Frank Wycheck	2007	
Keiichi Yamada	Jushin Thunder Liger	2005; 2006	
Yoshihiro Yamazaki	Tiger Mask	2007	
Brian Yandrisovitz	Brian Knobs; Knobs	2010	
Jennifer Ykmea	Girl Dynamite	2010	
Masato Yoshino	Masato Yoshino	2008	
Ace Young	Ace Young	2008	
David Young	David Young	2002–2007	
Jerome Young †	New Jack	2003; 2010	
James Yun	Jimmy Yang	2002; 2011	
Xia Zhao	Lei Ying Lee	2024–2026	
Nick Zoppo	Zicky Dice	2021–2023	
Priscilla Zuniga	Diamante	2017–2019	

Company name to Year
NWA: Total Nonstop Action	2002–2004
Total Nonstop Action Wrestling	2004–2017, 2024–present
Global Force Wrestling	June–September 2017
Impact Wrestling	March–June 2017, September 2017–January 2024
Notes
† Indicates they are deceased

== See also ==
- List of Total Nonstop Action Wrestling personnel
