= Sunsets & Sushi =

EP by David Crowder Band
- Released: February 15, 2005
- Genre: Christian rock, worship
- Length: 38:07
- Label: sixsteps

David Crowder Band chronology
The Lime CD (2004)	Sunsets & Sushi (2005)	A Collision Is Coming (2005)

Professional ratings
Review scores
Source	Rating
CCM Magazine	B
Christianity Today	3.5/5 stars
Cross Rhythms	8/10 squares
Jesus Freak Hideout	2.5/5 stars
The Phantom Tollbooth	1/5 Clocks 3.5/5 Clocks 4/5 Clocks 2.5/5 Clocks

Sunsets & Sushi: Experiments in Spectral Deconstruction is David Crowder Band's first studio EP. It contains remixes of eight songs from their 2003 release Illuminate.

== Track listing ==
1. "No One Like You (Thanksgiving Mix)"
2. "O Praise Him (All This for a King) (Oceanic Mix)"
3. "Open Skies (Dirty Beats Mix)"
4. "Revolutionary Love (Neo-mechanical Mix)"
5. "How Great (Direct from Satellite City)"
6. "Intoxicating (Pneumatic Mix)"
7. "Deliver Me (Antidromic Mix)"
8. "Stars (From the Mount Wilson Observatory)"
