= O esca viatorum =

Catholic eucharistic hymn

O esca viatorum ("O food of wayfarers") is a Latin-language Catholic eucharistic hymn. Its first edition is found in a Würzburg hymnal of 1647. It is sung to different tunes in the original Latin as well as in German and English translations.

== Origin ==
The authorship of this hymn is unknown; the widespread attribution to Saint Thomas Aquinas is definitely wrong. What is certain is that the earliest, extant publication of the text dates to 1647, and there is no evidence of an earlier genesis. The hymnologist Ernest Edwin Ryden supposes a German Jesuit to be the author.

== Text ==
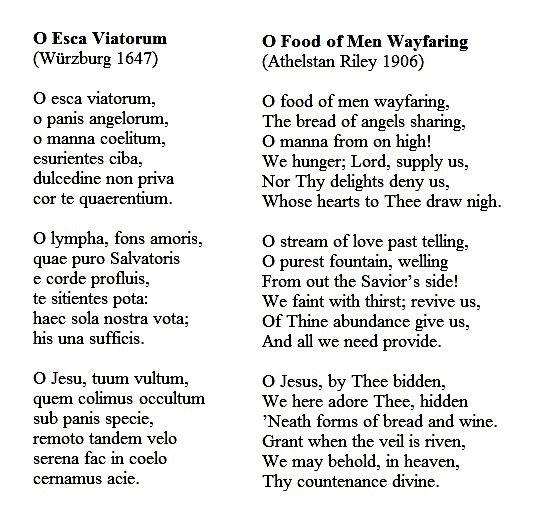
Latin text with the English adaptation O Food of Men Wayfaring by Athelstan Riley (1906)

The hymn consists of three verses with the rhyme scheme A-A-B-C-C-B. The first verse of the prayer expresses the desire to unite with Christ in eucharistic communion by means of his body; the second, by means of his blood. In the third verse, the singer's longing becomes eschatologic, and goes for the vision of Christ's face unveiled, whose hidden presence he adores in the eucharistic species.

== Musical settings ==
The hymn has been set to music by several composers, including Johann Michael Haydn, Joseph Haydn and Peter Piel. Heinrich Isaac's Innsbruck, ich muss dich lassen is often performed with the words of O esca viatorum and translations, such as the German "O heilge Seelenspeise" (O holy food for the soul).
