= Lyricist =

Songwriter who writes lyrics

A lyricist is a writer who writes lyrics (the spoken words), as opposed to a composer, who writes the song's music (which may include the melody, harmony, arrangement, and accompaniment).

== Royalties ==
A lyricist's income derives from royalties received from original songs. Royalties may range from 50% of the proceeds from the song, if it was written primarily with the composer, or less if they wrote the song in collaboration. Songs are automatically copyrighted as soon as they are in tangible forms, such as a recording or sheet music. However, before a song is published or made public, its author or publisher should register it with the Copyright Office at the United States Library of Congress to better protect against copyright infringement.

== Collaborations ==
Songwriting collaborations can take different forms. Some composers and lyricists work closely together on a song, with each having an input into both words and tune. Usually a lyricist fills in the words to a tune already fully written out. Dorothy Fields worked in this way. Lyricists have often added words to an established tune, as Johnny Burke did with the Erroll Garner jazz standard "Misty". Some partnerships work almost totally independently: for example, Bernie Taupin would write lyrics and hand them over to Elton John, who set them to music, with minimum interaction between the two writers.

The collaboration of John Lennon and Paul McCartney is widely considered the most successful songwriting partnership in history, with their songs making up the majority of The Beatles' catalog. Other famous collaborations include Leiber and Stoller, the Rolling Stones lead singer Mick Jagger with Keith Richards, and Richard Carpenter with John Bettis.

== Religious songwriting ==
In the Christian hymn-singing tradition, many of the popular pieces have words written to fit existing melodies. The Christmas carol "What Child Is This?" had its words set to an old English folk tune that had been a lover's lament, "Greensleeves". The English composer Ralph Vaughan Williams set existing poems, such as those by William Cowper and Charles Wesley, to traditional folk tunes to create hymns, many of which he published in The English Hymnal. Sometimes a piece combines unrelated words and tune, such as "The Star-Spangled Banner", the national anthem of the United States, with words written by Francis Scott Key strictly as a poem, later set to the tune of an old drinking song.

== Classical music ==
In opera, the librettist is responsible for all text, whether spoken or sung in recitative or aria.

== See also ==
- Singer-songwriter
- Robert Hunter (lyricist)
