= Can You Hear Us? =

Studio album by David Crowder Band
- Released: February 26, 2002
- Recorded: 2001
- Studio: The Boyd's Barn (Waco, Texas); Soundwerks, Charlie Peacock Productions and Wyndchase Studios (Nashville, Tennessee); The Castle (Franklin, Tennessee)
- Genre: Christian rock, worship
- Length: 55:25
- Label: sixsteps
- Producer: Brent Milligan

David Crowder Band chronology
All I Can Say (1998)	Can You Hear Us? (2002)	Illuminate (2003)

Can You Hear Us? is the debut studio album and third album overall by David Crowder Band and the first recorded for sixstepsrecords, released in February 2002.

== Critical reception ==
Professional ratings
Review scores
Source	Rating
Allmusic	4/5 stars
Christianity Today	2.5/5 stars
Cross Rhythms	9/10 squares
Jesus Freak Hideout	3.5/5 stars

Can You Hear Us? garnered a positive reception from music critics. At Jesus Freak Hideout, J.D. gave the album three-and-a-half stars highlighting the album as "a good start." Ashleigh Kittle of Allmusic gave the album four stars calling the release "intense and thought-provoking, yet at the same time lyrically tender". At Cross Rhythms, Jonathan Evans gave the album a nine out of ten squares commenting that the album is "Gutsy, edgy praise music from a talented musicianary, this deserves wide exposure." However, Andy Argyrakis of Christianity Today gave the album its only mixed rating at two-and-a-half stars cautioning that "For those seeking innovation in worship music, you'd best look elsewhere."

== Track listing ==
All tracks are written by David Crowder, except where noted.

Album release
No.	Title	Writer(s)	Length
1.	"I Need Words"		2:02
2.	"Our Love Is Loud"		4:47
3.	"You're Everything"		5:55
4.	"God of Creation"		4:15
5.	"Wonderful King"		6:18
6.	"All Creatures of Our God & King"	Francis of Assisi, William H. Draper	3:21
7.	"God of Wrath"		4:53
8.	"Obsession"	Martin Smith	6:00
9.	"My Hope"		4:16
10.	"Thank You for Hearing Me"	Sinéad O'Connor, John Reynolds	4:49
11.	"Undignified / You Alone"	Crowder, Jack Parker, Mike Redman	8:58
Total length:			55:25

== Personnel ==
David Crowder Band

- David Crowder – vocals, backing vocals, acoustic guitars, electric guitars, arrangements (6)
- Jack Parker – keyboards, electric guitars
- Jason Solley – electric guitars
- Mike Dodson – bass
- Jeremy Bush – drums
- Mike Hogan – violin, noises, vinyls

Additional musicians

- David Davidson – viola (9, 10), violin (9, 10)
- Brent Milligan – arrangements (6)
- Sarah Macintosh – backing vocals
- Robbie Seay – backing vocals

=== Production ===
- Grant Cunningham – executive producer
- Louie Giglio – executive producer
- Brent Milligan – producer, overdub engineer
- Shane D. Wilson – tracking engineer, mixing (1-3, 6, 9, 10, 11.2)
- Jacquire King – mixing (4, 5, 8)
- Russ Fowler – mixing (7, 11.1)
- Steve Short – mix assistant (7, 11.1)
- Stephen Marcussen – mastering at Marcussen Mastering (Hollywood, California)
- Christiév Carothers – creative director
- Jan Cook – art direction
- Benji Peck – art direction, design
- Kristin Barlowe – photography
