= The Company of Heaven =

1937 composition by Benjamin Britten

- by Benjamin Britten (1937)
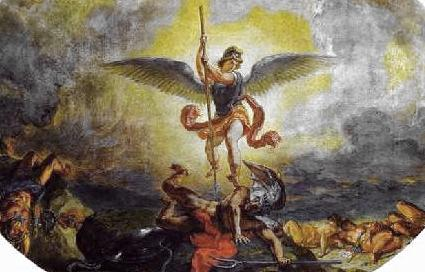
- Höllensturz by Eugène Delacroix, 1861 (fresco, Saint-Sulpice, Paris), corresponding to the texts about angels which are spoken and sung.

The Company of Heaven is a composition for soloists, speakers, choir, timpani, organ, and string orchestra by Benjamin Britten. The title refers to angels, the topic of the work, reflected in texts from the Bible and by poets. The music serves as incidental music for a mostly spoken radio feature which was first heard as a broadcast of the BBC in 1937.

== History ==
Britten composed the music between 8 August and 22 September 1937 as incidental music for a radio broadcast for Michaelmas on 29 September 1937. The associated text on angels, related to Michael as one of the archangels, was compiled by R Ellis Roberts. The broadcast was produced by Robin Whitworth, with an acting company headed by Felix Aylmer and singers led by Sophie Wyss and Peter Pears, with the BBC Chorus and the BBC Symphony Orchestra. The conductor was Trevor Harvey. The complete work lasted just under 45 minutes. Britten confided to his diary, "the poetry side of it is pretty long". One of the numbers, a setting of Emily Brontë's poem "A thousand gleaming fires", was the first piece of music Britten wrote for Pears, with whom he had recently begun a friendship that became a lifelong personal and professional partnership.

Although Britten and Roberts discussed publishing the piece or reworking it for concert performance, Britten did neither. The score came into the possession of Harvey around the beginning of the Second World War, and after the war he arranged a concert version, which he conducted on BBC radio on 20 May 1956. (Note: Britten wrote to Harvey in October 1955: "By all means go ahead and try and arrange a broadcast of some of the music you have discovered, only I can trust you only to put the good bits of music in and leave out the bad, can't I?") Harvey's version comprised Nos. 2, 6, 7 and 8. Another version was published in 1990. The first concert performance of the complete work (then described as a cantata) was given at the Aldeburgh Festival in 1989. Reviewing that performance, Hilary Finch wrote in The Times, "bearing up the mawkish tales of angelic rescue and hymning of watchers and holy ones, is a robust cyclic plan, some healthy string writing (Britten had recently completed the Frank Bridge Variations) and, best of all, a direct, unselfconscious engagement with the word so characteristic of early Britten." She concluded:

The composer's pleasure in bending and unbending plainchant to his own rhythmic and harmonic will is almost palpable; the metrical spoken (shouted) male chorus of "War in Heaven", a tour de force of earlier film techniques; the naivety of the Emily Bronte setting … in no way faux. The work abounds in fingerprints for the spotting (a Mahlerian funeral march, (Note: Harvey later recalled that he and Pears were sharing a flat when the work was being composed; Britten, a frequent visitor, would listen repeatedly to Harvey's copy of Bruno Walter's recent recording of Mahler's Ninth Symphony. Edward Greenfield comments, "The influence could hardly be plainer in the eighth, purely orchestral, movement of the cantata.") a fanfare heralding Les Illuminations, Britten's first "congregational" hymns; and it is primarily of documentary and musicological interest. But this occasional piece [is] certainly worth hearing occasionally.

== Scoring and structure ==
The work is scored for two speakers, soprano and tenor singers, a four-part choir, timpani, organ, and string orchestra.

Eleven movements of the text are set to music, others are spoken.

Part 1: Angels before the Creation

1. Chaos
2. The Morning Stars

Part 2: Angels in Holy Scripture

3. Angels appear to Jacob, Elisha and Mary
4. Christ, the fair glory
5. War in Heaven

Part 3: Angels in Common Life, and at our Death

6. Heaven is here
7. A thousand, thousand gleaming fires
8. Funeral March for a Boy
9. Whoso dwelleth under the defence of the most High
10. There came out also at this time
11. Ye Watchers and Ye Holy Ones

== Music and text ==
The text assembles writings about angels from biblical sources up to contemporary poetry. Most of the texts are spoken, selected texts are set to music by Britten who also composed two purely instrumental movements, an introduction and a funeral march as a comment to a preceding reading. Only the sections set to music are numbered.

The work opens with Introduction (movement 1), an orchestral movement depicting the chaos before the world was created. Spoken text follows, "He maketh the angels spirits, and his ministers a flame of fire" by Theodosius, "When all the sons of God shouted for joy", about Lucifer, by Gerard Manley Hopkins, "Hell heard th'unsufferable noise" by from Paradise Lost by John Milton. "The Morning Stars" (movement 2) is a choral movement that draws from the work of Joseph the Hymnographer.

Part 2, "Angels in Holy Scripture", begins with a spoken passage "Angels were the first creatures God made" by Thomas Heywood, followed by two biblical meetings with an angel, of Jacob in movement 3a (Genesis 28:10–12, 16–17), and Elisha in movement 3b (2 Kings 6:15–16), both set for choir and organ. A speaker continues with "It was the rebel angel, Lucifer" by Richard Ellis Roberts, then movement 3c for soprano, choir and organ reflects the annunciation to Mary (Luke 1:26–28, 48). Choral movement 4 sets a hymn Archbishop Rabanus Maurus translated by Athelstan Riley, "Christ the fair glory of the holy angels". Britten later reworked this movement into a piece for voice, cello, and piano. A speaker continues with another text by Roberts, "And as it was in the beginning ... the light shall triumph", leading to the final movement 5 in Part 2, "War in Heaven". Verses from the Book of Revelation (Revelation 12:7–9 and Revelation 18:1, 20) are set in a dramatic way as battle music for speaking choir and orchestra.

Part 3, "Angels in Common Life, and at our Death" begins with movement 6 for soprano, choir and orchestra, "Heaven is here" from an unknown source. Another spoken passage by Roberts follows, "There are those, not only Christians", about "guardian spirits". The text of movement 7, set for tenor and orchestra, is a poem by Emily Brontë, "A thousand, thousand gleaming fires". The following story tells about a boy who is killed in an accident and met by his guardian angel, followed by movement 8, a funeral march for orchestra. A speaker recites a poem by Christina Rossetti, "Golden-winged, silver-winged". Movement 9 sets verses from Psalm 91 (Psalms 91:1, 9–13 for a cappella choir with the densest vocal texture, SSAATTBB. A spoken poem follows, "Farewell, green field" by William Blake. Movement 10 is a melodrama for speaker and orchestra on a passage from the novel The Pilgrims Progress by John Bunyan, "There came out also at this time to meet him", describing the reception of two pilgrims in Heaven. Verses from the Gospel of Luke (Luke 20:3536 reflect the resurrection. The last spoken text is by Dante Gabriel Rossetti, "I think they laugh in heaven". The work is concluded by movement 11 for both soloists, choir and orchestra on a hymn by Athelstan Riley, "O ye angels of the Lord, bless ye the Lord". In the end, the central theme is recapitulated from movement 6: "Heaven is here".

== Recordings ==
- English Chamber Orchestra, London Philharmonic Choir, Philip Brunelle. Britten: The Company of Heaven. Virgin, 2003.
- National Sinfonia, Crouch End Festival Chorus, Fiona Shaw and Jonathan Pryce as speakers, David Temple. Britten: The Company of Heaven and The Burning Road by Will Todd. Silva Screen Records, 1999.

== Notes and references ==
Notes

=== Sources ===
- Britten, Benjamin (1998). Philip Reed; Mervyn Cooke; Donald Mitchell (eds.). Letters from a Life: The Selected Letters of Benjamin Britten. Vol. IV, 1952–1957. London: Faber and Faber. ISBN 0571194001.
- Matthews, David (2013). Britten. London: Haus Publishing. ISBN 978-1908323385.
