= The Lime CD =

Live album by David Crowder Band
- Released: March 23, 2004
- Genres: Christian rock, worship
- Length: 42:09
- Label: sixsteps

David Crowder Band chronology
Illuminate (2003)	The Lime CD (2004)	Sunsets & Sushi (2005)

Professional ratings
Review scores
Source	Rating
Allmusic	3.5/5 stars
Christianity Today	4/5 stars
Cross Rhythms	9/10 squares
Jesus Freak Hideout	3.5/5 stars
The Phantom Tollbooth	3.5/5 stars

The Lime CD is David Crowder Band's first live album and fifth overall. It is a combination of their previous two live EPs, The Green CD and The Yellow CD, with the addition of two previously unreleased tracks.

== Track listing ==
Album release
No.	Title	Writer(s)	Length
1.	"Make a Joyful Noise / I Will Not Be Silent"	Terry Butler, David Crowder	6:56
2.	"Every Move I Make"	David Ruis	5:32
3.	"Sing Like the Saved"	Matt Redman	4:53
4.	"You Alone"	Crowder, Jack Parker	5:37
5.	"Undignified"	Redman	4:09
6.	"I Need Words / God of Wrath"	Crowder	8:00
7.	"End of October"	Jeremy Bush, Mike Hogan	2:31
8.	"Heaven Came Down" (Demo Version)	John W. Peterson	4:22
Total length:			41:57

== Chart positions ==
Chart (2007–2008)	Peak position
Billboard Hot Christian Albums	16
