= Illuminate (David Crowder Band album) =

Album by David Crowder Band

Studio album by David Crowder Band
- Released: September 16, 2003
- Recorded: 2002 – 2003
- Studios: 3004 Franklin Ave. (Waco, Texas); Art House and Pentavarit (Nashville, Tennessee)
- Genres: Christian rock, worship
- Length: 56:36
- Label: sixsteps
- Producers: David Crowder Band; Charlie Peacock; Mitch Watkins; Zach Lind

David Crowder Band chronology
Can You Hear Us? (2002)	Illuminate (2003)	The Lime CD (2004)

Singles from Illuminate
- 1. "O Praise Him (All This For A King)" Released: 2003; 2. "Open Skies" Released: 2004

Illuminate is the second studio album and fourth album overall by David Crowder Band recorded for sixstepsrecords, released in September 2003.

== Critical reception ==
Professional ratings
Review scores
Source	Rating
AllMusic	4.5/5 stars
CCM Magazine	B
Christianity Today	3.5/5 stars
Cross Rhythms	10/10 squares
Jesus Freak Hideout	4/5 stars
The Phantom Tollbooth	4/5 stars

Illuminate garnered critical acclaim from music critics. At CCM Magazine, Dan MacIntosh graded the album a B commenting that listeners will discover first and foremost the vulnerable vocalist in David Crowder, and then discover "ultimately it's the diversity of songs and creativity in arrangements that set Illuminate apart as a shining example of modern praise & worship." Tom Lennie of Cross Rhythms gave the album a perfect ten squares noting the "rare combination of passion and sensitivity." At Christianity Today, Russ Breimeier gave it a three-and-a-half stars affirming that "If the success of their last album is any indicator, Illuminate is bound to be a smash."

At Jesus Freak Hideout, founder John DiBiase gave the album four stars highlighting that "Illuminate not only is an excellent worship record and one of the best in the genre released this year, but easily solidifies Crowder's position as one of the foremost leaders in modern worship music today." Jared Johnson of Allmusic gave the album four-and-a-half stars alluding to how the "brilliant innovative sound" making the band ride "a sonic edge that is helping lead modern worship into new, uncharted territory" and that "There's too much in them begging to be heard" for them to stay quiet. At The Phantom Tollbooth, Kevin Mathews noting that "As with Can You Hear Us?, Illuminate is an important milestone for God-centric rock music as it proves that worship music need not be bandwagonesque or impersonal or lacking in artistic depth."

== Track listing ==
Album release
No.	Title	Writer(s)	Length
1.	"Sparks Fly"	David Crowder	0:18
2.	"Revolutionary Love"	Crowder, Jeremy Bush, Jack Parker	3:59
3.	"O Praise Him (All This For A King)"	Crowder	5:48
4.	"Skies Interlude"		0:28
5.	"Open Skies"	Crowder	3:59
6.	"Intoxicating"	Crowder	7:30
7.	"How Great"	Crowder	4:03
8.	"No One Like You"	David Crowder Band	3:53
9.	"Reprise"	Crowder	0:48
10.	"All Creatures #2"	St. Francis of Assisi; Additional chorus and arrangement: Crowder	5:16
11.	"Only You"	Crowder, Mike Dodson, Mike Hogan, Jason Solley	4:02
12.	"Deliver Me"	Helena Marsh, John Marsh	4:42
13.	"Coming Toward"	David Crowder Band	2:14
14.	"Heaven Came Down"	John W. Peterson; Arrangement: Crowder	4:14
15.	"Glorious Day"	Crowder	0:28
16.	"Stars"	Crowder	4:41
Total length:			56:25

== Personnel ==
David Crowder Band

- David Crowder – lead vocals, backing vocals, acoustic piano, acoustic guitars, electric guitars
- Jack Parker – Rhodes electric piano, Wurlitzer electric piano, Casio keyboard, Moog synthesizer, electric guitars, backing vocals
- Jason Soley – electric guitars, backing vocals
- Mike Dodson – programming, electric guitars, bass guitar
- Mike Hogan – Casio keyboard, programming, violin, vinyl sounds
- Jeremy "B-Wack" Bush – drums, percussion, programming, Casio keyboard, mufflers

Additional musicians

- Charlie Peacock – additional keyboards (3, 5), programming (3, 5)
- Gary Burnette – additional electric guitars
- Jerry McPherson – additional electric guitars (3, 5)
- Mitch Watkins – additional electric guitars (6, 16)
- Zach Lind – additional drums (5, 7)
- Bob Mason – cello (5)
- Chris Eaton – additional backing vocals (3, 5)
- Nirva Dorsaint – backing vocals (5)

=== Production ===
- Louie Giglio – executive producer
- Brad O'Donnell – executive producer
- David Crowder Band – producers (1, 2, 4, 6-16)
- Charlie Peacock – producer (3, 5)
- Zach Lind – original production (5), producer (7)
- Mitch Watkins – producer (6, 16)
- Shane D. Wilson – recording, mixing
- Chris Henning – recording assistant
- Richie Biggs – additional tracking (3, 5)
- Jim DeMain – mastering at Yes Master (Nashville, Tennessee)
- Leah Payne – budget administrator (3, 5)
- Jan Cook – creative director
- Benji Peck – art direction, design
- Dan Winters – photography

== Chart positions ==
Chart (2007–2008)	Peak position
Billboard 200	84
Billboard Hot Christian Albums	3
