= Athelstan Riley =

English hymn writer

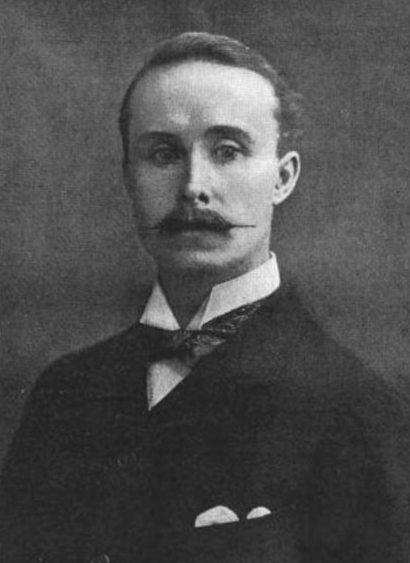
- In The Sketch, 21 November 1894
- Born: John Athelstan Laurie Riley; 10 August 1858; Paddington, London, England
- Died: 17 November 1945 (aged 87); Jersey, Channel Islands
- Education: Pembroke College, Oxford
- Occupations: Hymn writer, translator
- Spouse: Andalusia Louisa Charlotte Georgina Molesworth (m. 1887)

John Athelstan Laurie Riley (10 August 1858 – 17 November 1945) was an English hymn writer and hymn translator.

== Biography ==
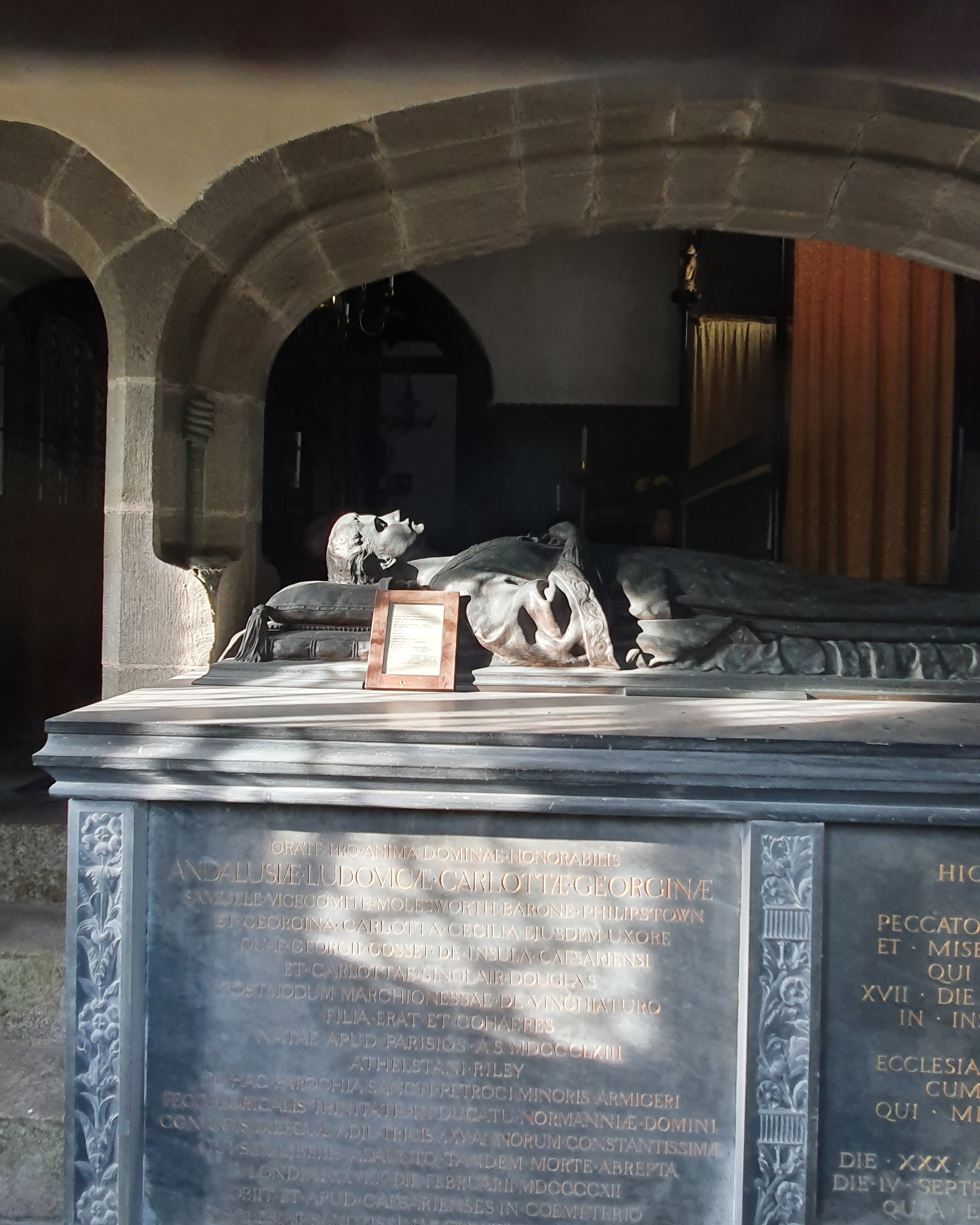
Monument to his wife in St Petroc Minor's Church, Little Petherick, Cornwall

Riley was born in Paddington, London, and attended Pembroke College, Oxford, where obtained his BA in 1881 and MA in 1883. Active in the Anglo-Catholic wing of the Church of England and a member of the Alcuin Club, he energised the development of The English Hymnal (1906) and was chairman of its editorial board. His best-known hymn is "Ye Watchers and Ye Holy Ones". He also created an English adaption of the eucharistic hymn "O Esca Viatorum".

In 1887, he married Andalusia Louisa Charlotte Georgina Molesworth, daughter of Samuel Molesworth, 8th Viscount Molesworth. The youngest son Quintin Riley was born in 1905 in Little Petherick, Cornwall.

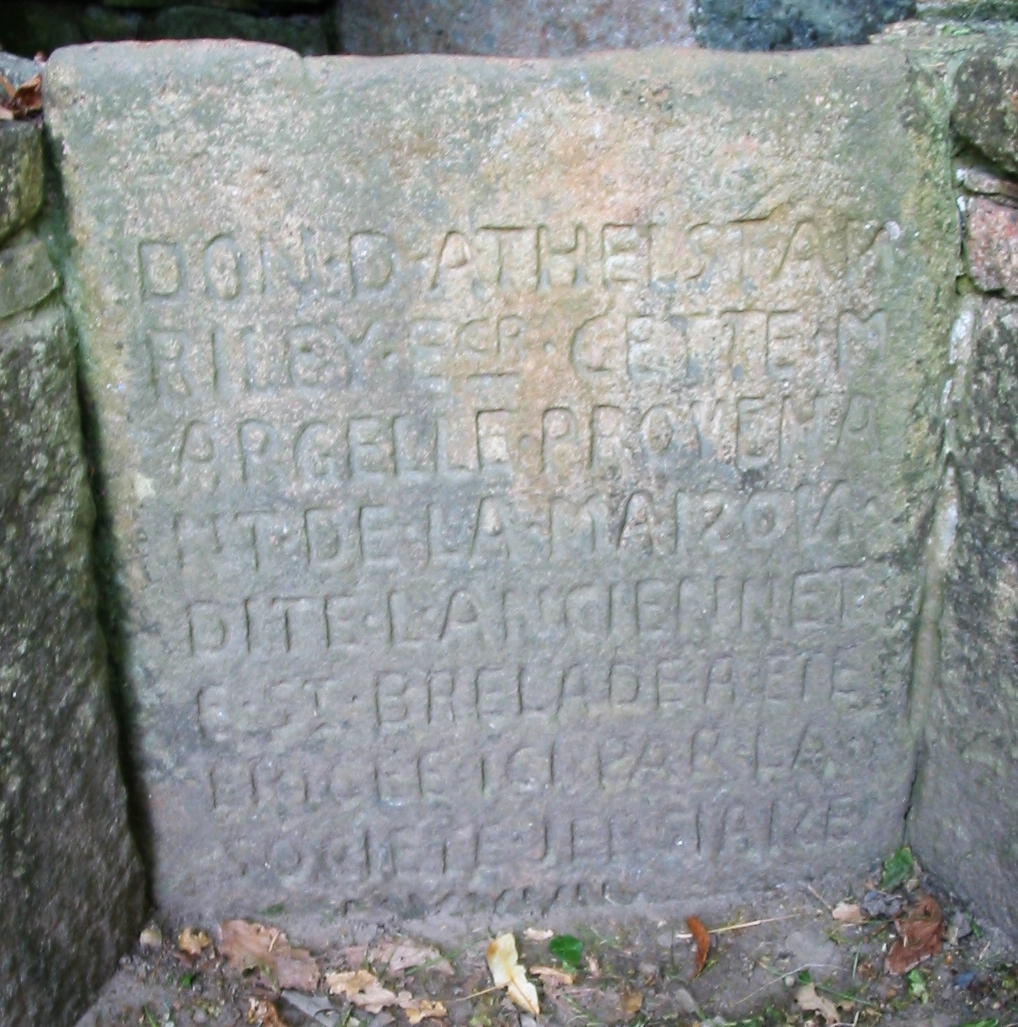
Plaque at La Hougue Bie with inscription recording a gift: Don d'Athelstan Riley Ecr cette margelle provenant de la maison dite L'Ancienneté St Brélade a été érigée ici par La Société Jersiaise

Riley's London house, at 2 Kensington Court, contained an altarpiece by Ninian Comper, a major designer of Anglo-Catholic church furnishings. He held the advowson of St Peter ad Vincula, Coveney, Cambridgeshire from 1883 and furnished the church.

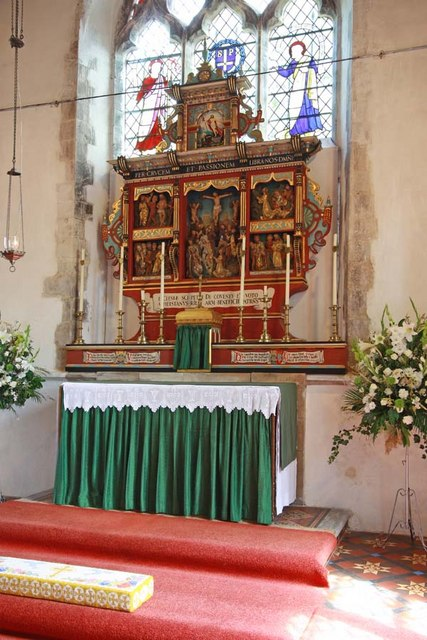
Reredos of St Peter ad Vincula, Coveney

Later in his life, he moved to Jersey in the Channel Islands, where he purchased Trinity Manor in 1909, thereby acquiring the feudal title of Seigneur de La Trinité. Finding the manor house in a ruined condition, he undertook an elaborate restoration (or "imaginative reconstruction", which has been criticized as turning the building into a French-style château). The reconstruction was carried out 1910–1913 by C. Messervy to designs by Sir Reginald Blomfield. Riley also bought the historic property L'Ancienneté in Saint Brélade, and removed architectural features of interest to incorporate into Trinity Manor, carefully recording the provenance of items and nature of alterations made in his project. He remained in Jersey through the German occupation, and died there shortly after its liberation, on 17 November 1945.

He was created a Companion of the Roll of Honour of the Memorial of Merit of King Charles the Martyr in 1921.
