= The New English Hymnal =

1986 Anglican hymnal

- Cover of The New English Hymnal
- Language: English
- Subject: Religious sheet music/hymnal and Christian liturgy
- Publisher: Canterbury Press
- Publication date: 1986
- Publication place: United Kingdom
- Media type: Print (hardback)
- ISBN: 978-0-907547-51-8 (full music edition)
- Website: The New English Hymnal on Canterbury Press

The New English Hymnal is a hymn book and liturgical source aimed towards the Church of England. First published in 1986, it is a successor to, and published in the same style as, the 1906 English Hymnal. It is published today by SCM Canterbury Press, an imprint of Hymns Ancient and Modern Ltd.

== Origin ==
The New English Hymnal inherits much music from the original 1906 English Hymnal, its 1933 revision, and the 1975 supplement English Praise, although a few hymns are re-written or dropped in favor of newly added hymns. The words of several hymns have been altered slightly, although it nonetheless enjoys continuing favour in a considerable number of cathedrals and collegiate chapels worldwide and it is a significant publication in Anglican church music. Its extensive provision of hymns for saints' days and mid-week religious festivals has proved popular with those schools still maintaining hymn-singing in daily acts of worship.

The copyright is held by The English Hymnal Company Limited. The then chairman of the company, George Timms, was its general editor. The musical editor was Anthony Caesar with significant assistance from Arthur Hutchings, Christopher Dearnley, and Michael Fleming. It is published today by SCM Canterbury Press, an imprint of Hymns Ancient and Modern Ltd.

== Supplement and revision ==
A supplement, New English Praise, was published in 2006 containing additional liturgical material, canticle settings, psalm settings and plainchant accompaniments.

A full revision was published as The Revised English Hymnal on 29 November 2023. It was initially scheduled for publication in 2018, 60 years after the death of its first musical editor, Ralph Vaughan Williams. Due to the effects of Coronavirus pandemic, it was then due to be published in 2021. In April 2021 the publication date was moved to September of the same year. In January 2022 it was announced that publication had been postponed to 30 June 2022. In October 2022 it was announced that the publication of the full music edition would be May 2023. At the time of the actual publication of the full music version in November 2023, the words only and melody were editions are scheduled to be published in January and Spring 2024 respectively.

== See also ==
- English Hymnal
- List of English-language hymnals by denomination
- Category:Hymns in The New English Hymnal
