= Peter Piel =

German music pioneer

Peter Piel (12 August 1835 – 21 August 1904) was a German pioneer in the movement for reform of church music.
