= Jason Whitehorn =

American singer-songwriter

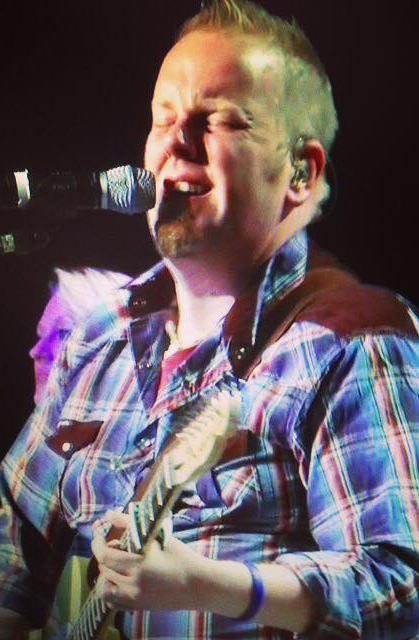
- Jason Whitehorn in concert in ND, USA

Background information
- Born: January 19, 1976 (age 49)
- Origin: Memphis, Tennessee, United States
- Genres: Contemporary worship music, CCM, country
- Occupations: Singer; songwriter; worship leader; worship pastor
- Instrument(s): Vocals, rhythm guitar
- Years active: 2000-present
- Labels: REST Music, Classified Country
- Website: www.jasonwhitehorn.me

Jason Whitehorn (born January 19, 1976) is an American contemporary worship music singer and songwriter. He has been writing, performing and releasing both country and worship music for over a decade since his career began in early 2000. He originally lived just outside Savannah, Tennessee where he and Darryl Worley attended high school. He has performed or worked with Darryl Worley, Thrasher Shiver, Bryan White, David Allan Coe, Matt Maher, Casting Crowns, Matt Redman and has collaborated with others.

Whitehorn is currently a writer for Worship Leader Magazine, Compassion International touring artist, and a national worship conference speaker.

== Career ==
Whitehorn began his professional career while managing and playing lead guitar for Shane Avery. Shortly after September 11th, he and Avery co-wrote "Song of America" and released the song to radio stations and select retailers in order to raise money for the families of fallen fire and police officers of New York City. Soon after Jason departed from the relationship managing Avery, he began a solo career of his own. He wrote "Knock, Knock" and "Prisoner of My Mind".

== Music ==
In his earlier years Whitehorn's music was rooted deeply in country, but in mid-2008 he began developing as a contemporary Christian artist and departing from some of the more traditional "pop-style" country that his fans had been more accustomed to. Now, Jason is concentrating more on honing his skills as a songwriter instead of being merely an entertainer. Jason writes and releases songs for the church community that garner moderate crossover into the commercial radio world with releases of songs like "Never Alone."

== Discography ==
Studio albums

- As Long As I Have Breath (2017)

== Other ==
Whitehorn appeared on the television show Impact! as the character "Jason Gentry" on SpikeTV between 2009 and 2013.

== Personal ==
Jason lives just outside of Indianapolis, Indiana with his wife and two children.
