= Ye Watchers and Ye Holy Ones =

1906 hymn

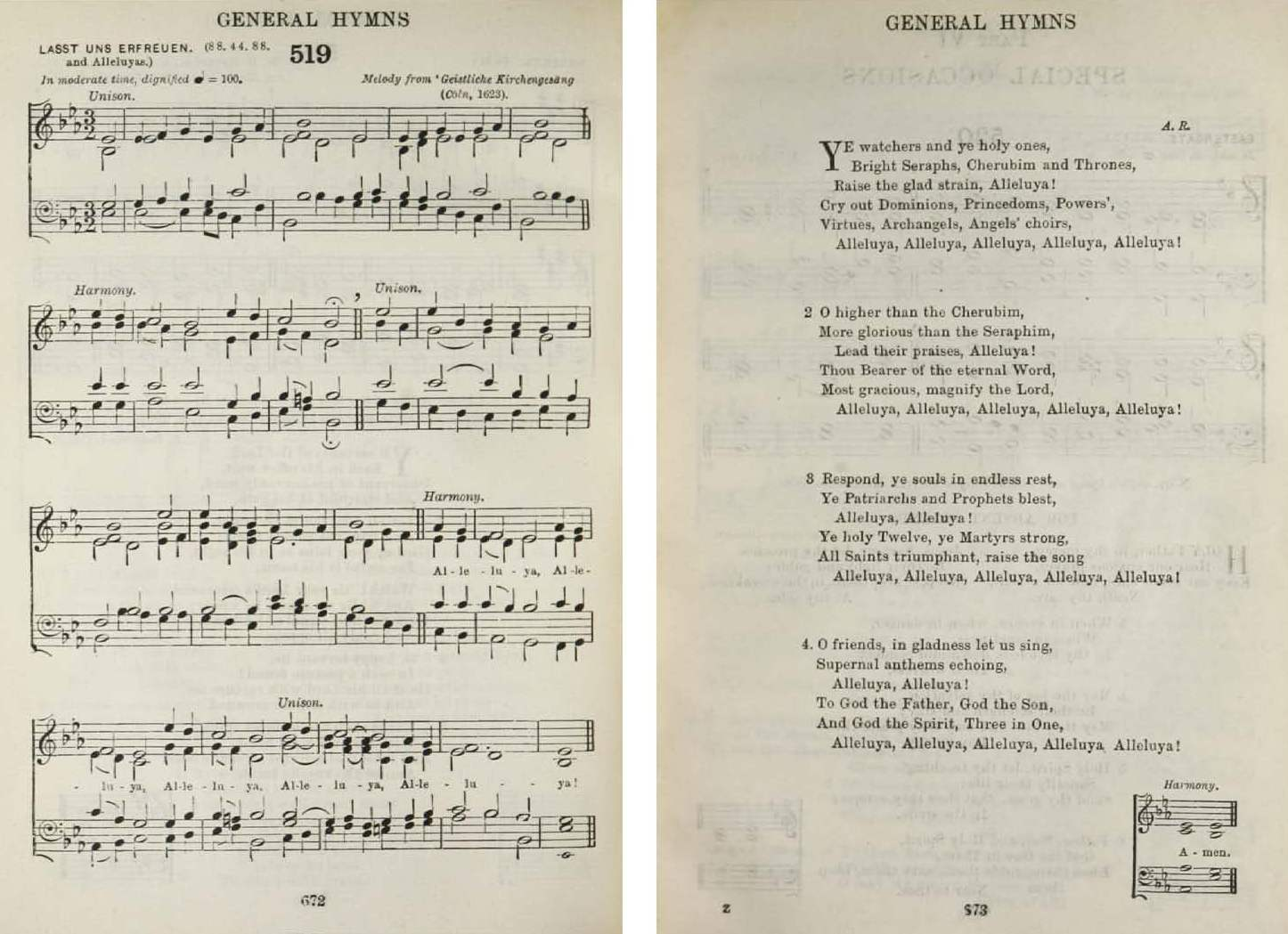
- Original publication: English Hymnal, 1906
- Genre: Hymn
- Written: 1906
- Text: Athelstan Riley
- Based on: Psalm 135:1-3
- Meter: 8.8.8.8.8.8.8.4
- Melody: "Lasst uns erfreuen"

"Ye Watchers and Ye Holy Ones" (Latin: Vigiles et Sancti) is a popular Christian hymn with text by Athelstan Riley, first published in the English Hymnal (1906). It is sung to the German tune Lasst uns erfreuen (1623). Its uplifting melody and repeated "Alleluias" make this a favourite Anglo-Catholic hymn during the Easter season, the Feast of All Saints, and other times of great rejoicing.

The hymn was also notably adapted for the final movement of The Company of Heaven (1937), a cantata by Benjamin Britten.

== Text ==
The 1906 text is based on two ancient Christian prayers, Te Deum and Axion Estin. The first stanza addresses each of the traditional nine choirs of angels. The second stanza focuses on the Blessed Virgin Mary. The third stanza urges the faithful departed to join in praising God, including the church patriarchs, prophets, apostles, martyrs and saints, addressed in groups similar to those in the Litany of the Saints. The fourth stanza finally addresses the present congregation to join together in praise. So, this hymn addresses the traditional Three States of the Church (the Church Triumphant, the Church Expectant, the Church Militant), reflecting the belief in the communion of saints.

The original text follows:

Ye watchers and ye holy ones,
Bright Seraphs, Cherubim and Thrones,

Raise the glad strain, Alleluya!

Cry out, Dominions, Princedoms, Powers,
Virtues, Archangels, Angels' choirs,

Alleluya, Alleluya, Alleluya, Alleluya, Alleluya!

O higher than the Cherubim,
More glorious than the Seraphim,

Lead their praises, Alleluya!

Thou Bearer of the eternal Word,
Most gracious, magnify the Lord,

Alleluya, Alleluya, Alleluya, Alleluya, Alleluya!

Respond, ye souls in endless rest,
Ye Patriarchs and Prophets blest,

Alleluya, Alleluya!

Ye holy Twelve, ye Martyrs strong,
All Saints triumphant, raise the song,

Alleluya, Alleluya, Alleluya, Alleluya, Alleluya!

O friends, in gladness let us sing,
Supernal anthems echoing,

Alleluya, Alleluya!

To God the Father, God the Son,
And God the Spirit, Three in One,

Alleluya, Alleluya, Alleluya, Alleluya, Alleluya!

Amen.

== Melody ==
Below is the 1623 German hymn tune Lasst uns erfreuen, as set in the 1906 English Hymnal:
