= The English Hymnal =

1906 Anglican hymnal

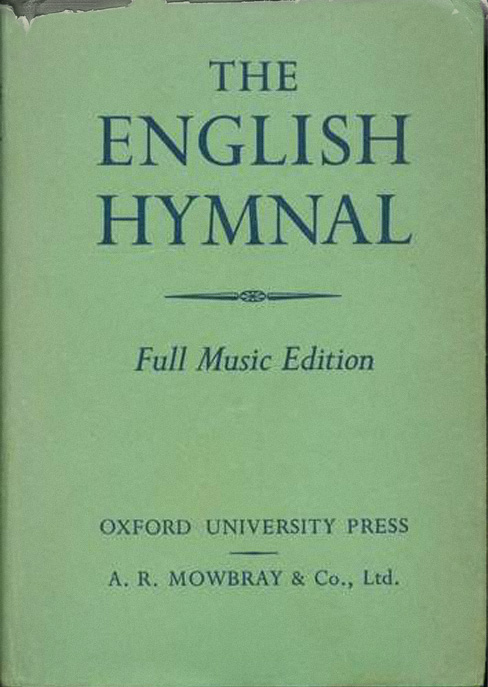
- Front cover
- Editors: Percy Dearmer; Ralph Vaughan Williams
- Language: English
- Subject: Religious sheet music
- Publisher: Oxford University Press
- Publication date: 1906
- Publication place: United Kingdom
- Media type: Print (hardcover)
- ISBN: 978-0-19-231111-5 (later edition)
- Text: The English Hymnal at Wikisource

The English Hymnal is a hymn book which was published in 1906 for the Church of England by Oxford University Press. It was edited by the clergyman and writer Percy Dearmer and the composer and music historian Ralph Vaughan Williams, and was a significant publication in the history of Anglican church music.

== Methodology ==
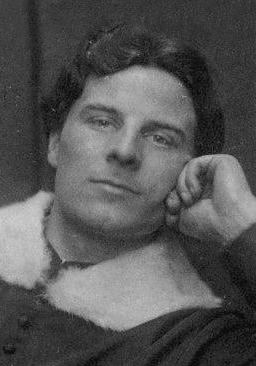
Percy Dearmer (c. 1890)

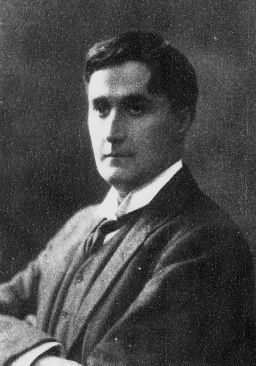
Ralph Vaughan Williams (1913)

The preface to the hymnal describes itself as "a collection of the best hymns in the English language." Much of the contents was used for the first time at St Mary's, Primrose Hill, in north London and the hymnbook could be considered a musical companion to The Parson's Handbook, Dearmer's 1899 manifesto on English church ceremonial, vestments and furnishings.

The high quality of the music is due largely to the work of Vaughan Williams as musical editor. The standard of the arrangements and original compositions made it a landmark in English hymnody and one of the most influential hymnals of the 20th century. The hymnal included the first printing of several arrangements and hymn settings by Vaughan Williams. Among the most famous are Sine Nomine, a new tune to For All the Saints; and Ye Watchers and Ye Holy Ones, a new text for the hymn tune Lasst uns erfreuen. The hymnal also includes many plainsong melodies (in both plainsong and modernised notation).

== Reception ==
After its publication, use of the hymnal had been banned for a time by the Archbishop of Canterbury. Ultimately, The English Hymnal, along with the Church Hymnal for the Christian Year, "undermined the uniformity of the Church of England and successfully challenged [the] hegemony" of Hymns Ancient and Modern, of which a new and revised edition had been published two years previous.

The book is a characteristic green colour and is sometimes associated with the high-church or Anglo-Catholic movement within Anglicanism. When the book was published, high and broad churches used Hymns Ancient and Modern and evangelical churches normally used the Hymnal Companion to the Book of Common Prayer. The hymnal has, however, been adopted not only in various movements of Anglicanism but also in several other denominations in Britain, such as some Roman Catholic churches.

== Revisions ==
A new edition of The English Hymnal was issued in 1933, which principally had better accompaniments by J. H. Arnold to the plainsong melodies, and over 100 new tunes. This was achieved without renumbering hymns or extending the book excessively. Instead many formerly duplicated tunes were changed to new tunes. Where unique tunes were changed the old tunes were moved into an appendix, which is often referred to as "the chamber of horrors", a description attributed to Vaughan-Williams himself.

A supplement to the hymnal, English Praise, was published in 1975.

The New English Hymnal appeared in 1986, and its supplement, New English Praise in 2006, both under the imprint of the Canterbury Press, now SCM Canterbury Press. The Revised English Hymnal was published on 29 November 2023.

== See also ==
- List of English-language hymnals by denomination
- Songs of Praise (hymnal), a broader selection of hymns edited by Dearmer, Shaw, and Vaughan Williams in 1925
