= David Crowder Band discography =

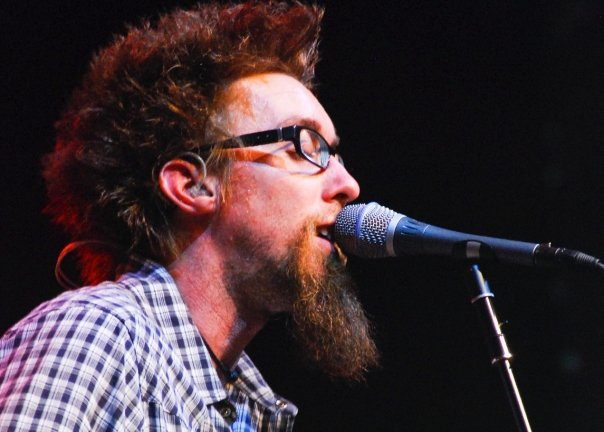
- David Crowder, lead singer of the David Crowder Band
- Studio albums: 6
- EPs: 4
- Live albums: 2
- Compilation albums: 1
- Singles: 16

The discography of Christian rock and modern worship band David Crowder Band consists of six studio albums, three extended plays (EPs), one compilation album, two live albums, one holiday album and sixteen singles.

== Discography ==
=== Independent albums ===
- 1996 - Pour Over Me, no-label
- 1998 - All I Can Say, no-label

=== Studio albums ===
List of studio albums, with selected chart positions and certifications
Title	Album details	Peak chart positions	
Title	Album details	US 200	US Christ
Can You Hear Us?	Released: February 26, 2002; Label: sixsteps; Format: CD, digital download	—	17
Illuminate	Released: September 16, 2003; Label: sixsteps; Format: CD, digital download	84	3
A Collision	Released: September 27, 2005; Label: sixsteps; Format: CD, digital download	39	1
Remedy	Released: September 25, 2007; Label: sixsteps; Format: CD, digital download	22	1
Church Music	Released: September 22, 2009; Label: sixsteps; Format: CD, digital download, vinyl	11	1
Give Us Rest	Released: January 10, 2012; Label: sixsteps; Format: CD, digital download, vinyl	2	1
"—" denotes that a release that did not chart

=== Live albums ===
List of live albums, with selected chart positions and certifications
Title	Album details	Peak chart positions	
Title	Album details	US 200	US Christ
The Lime CD	Released: March 23, 2004; Label: sixsteps; Format: CD, digital download	–	16
Remedy Club Tour – Live	Released: April 19, 2008; Label: sixsteps; Format: CD, digital download	88	5

=== Independent Live albums ===
- 2002 - The Green CD, no-label
- 2003 - The Yellow CD, no-label

=== Compilation albums ===
List of compilation albums, with selected chart positions and certifications
Title	Album details	Peak chart positions	
Title	Album details	US 200	US Christ
All This for a King: The Essential Collection	Released: May 21, 2013; Label: sixsteps; Format: CD, digital download	70	3

=== Holiday albums ===
List of holiday albums, with selected chart positions and certifications
Title	Album details	Peak chart positions	
Title	Album details	US 200	US Christ
Oh for Joy	Released: October 4, 2011; Label: sixsteps; Format: CD, digital download	82	6

=== EPs ===
List of Extended Play albums, with selected chart positions and certifications
Title	Album details	Peak chart positions	
Title	Album details	US 200	US Christ
Sunsets & Sushi	Released: February 15, 2005; Label: sixsteps; Format: CD, digital download	–	5
B Collision	Released: June 27, 2006; Label: sixsteps; Format: CD, digital download	118	5
Summer Happiness	Released: June 22, 2010; Label: sixsteps; Format: CD, digital download, vinyl	105	5

== Singles ==
List of singles, with selected chart positions
Title	Year	Peak chart positions	Certifications	Album
Title	Year	US Christ.	Certifications	Album
"O Praise Him (All This for a King)"	2003	21		Illuminate
"Open Skies"	2004	7		Illuminate
"Here Is Our King"	2005	7		A Collision
"Wholly Yours"	2006	7		A Collision
"A Beautiful Collision" (appears on A Collision Is Coming)	2005	—		A Collision
"Do Not Move" (appears on A Collision Is Coming)	2005	—		A Collision
"Foreverandever, Etc." (appears on A Collision Is Coming)	2005	24		A Collision
"Everything Glorious"	2007	2		Remedy
"Never Let Go"	2008	27		Remedy
"O, For a Thousand Tongues to Sing"	2008	24		Remedy
"How He Loves"	2009	8	RIAA: 2× Platinum	Church Music
"Oh, Happiness"	2010	38		Church Music
"SMS (Shine)"	2010	21		Church Music
"Go, Tell It on the Mountain"	2011	34		Oh for Joy
"The First Noel"	2011	28		Oh for Joy
"Joy to the World"	2011	27		Oh for Joy
"Let Me Feel You Shine"	2011	20		Give Us Rest
"After All (Holy)"	2012	19		Give Us Rest

== Other charted songs ==
List of singles, with selected chart positions
Title	Year	Peak chart positions	Album
Title	Year	US Christ. Digital	Album
"Oh Great God, Give Us Rest"	2012	17	Give Us Rest

== Music videos ==
Year	Title	Album	Source
2006	"Foreverandever Etc..."	A Collision	Watch
2009	"How He Loves"	Church Music	Watch
2010	"SMS [Shine]"	Church Music	Watch
2012	"Carol of the Bells / Christmas Eve (Sarajevo 12/24)"	Oh for Joy	Watch
2012	"Let Me Feel You Shine"	Give Us Rest	Watch
