= 37th GMA Dove Awards =

2006 US music awards ceremony

- Date: April 5, 2006
- Location: Grand Ole Opry House, Nashville, Tennessee
- Hosted by: Rebecca St. James and Kirk Franklin

The 37th Annual GMA Dove Awards, also called the 37th Annual GMA Music Awards, were held on April 5, 2006 recognizing accomplishments of Christian musicians for the year 2005. The show was held at the Grand Ole Opry House in Nashville, Tennessee, and was hosted by Rebecca St. James and Kirk Franklin. This was the last year in which the awards were called the "GMA Music Awards", since they will change their names to "GMA Dove Awards".

Nominations were announced earlier in 2006 by Kirk Franklin and Rebecca St. James at the Hilton Nashville Downtown in Music City, Tennessee.

Chris Tomlin won four awards, including Artist of the Year, while The Afters were awarded New Artist of the Year. Casting Crowns, David Crowder Band, Kirk Franklin, and The Crabb Family each won two awards.

== Performers ==
Telecast ceremony

The following performed:

Artist(s)	Song(s)
Jeremy Camp; David Crowder; Mark Hall; Mac Powell	Tribute to Steven Curtis Chapman: "For the Sake of the Call" "More To This Life" "Magnificent Obsession" "I Will Be Here" "Dive"
BarlowGirl	
Kirk Franklin	"Looking For You"
Kutless	"Shut Me Out"
Sawyer Brown	
The Brooklyn Tabernacle Choir	"Hallelujah Anyhow"
Natalie Grant	"Held"
Martha Munizzi	
Mark Schultz	"I Am"
Chris Tomlin	"How Great Is Our God"
Ernie Haase & Signature Sound	
Israel & New Breed	
Rebecca St. James	
Third Day	"Cry Out to Jesus"

== Awards ==
=== General ===
Artist of the Year

- Casting Crowns
- Chris Tomlin
- Jeremy Camp
- Natalie Grant
- Switchfoot

New Artist of the Year

- Ernie Haase & Signature Sound
- Krystal Meyers
- Mat Kearney
- Stellar Kart
- The Afters

Group of the Year

- BarlowGirl
- Casting Crowns
- David Crowder Band
- Kutless
- MercyMe

Male Vocalist of the Year

- Chris Tomlin
- David Phelps
- Jason Crabb
- Jeremy Camp
- Mark Hall

Female Vocalist of the Year

- Amy Grant
- Bethany Dillon
- Joy Williams
- Natalie Grant
- Nichole Nordeman

Song of the Year

- "Cry Out to Jesus" – Third Day
  - Mac Powell, Tai Anderson, Brad Avery, David Carr, Mark Lee, songwriters
- "Friend of God" – Israel and New Breed
  - Israel Houghton, Michael Gungor, songwriters
- "Held" – Natalie Grant
  - Christa Wells, songwriter
- "Hide" – Joy Williams
  - Joy Williams, Jason Houser, Matthew West, songwriters
- "Holy is the Lord" – Chris Tomlin
  - Chris Tomlin, Louie Giglio, songwriters
- "How Great is Our God" – Chris Tomlin
  - Chris Tomlin, Jesse Reeves, Ed Cash, songwriters
- "Indescribable" – Laura Story
  - Laura Story, Jesse Reeves, songwriters
- "Lifesong" – Casting Crowns
  - Mark Hall, songwriter
- "Only Grace" – Matthew West
  - Matthew West, Kenny Greenberg, songwriters
- "Voice of Truth" – Casting Crowns
  - Mark Hall, Steven Curtis Chapman, songwriters

Producer of the Year

- Ed Cash
- Brown Bannister
- Mark A. Miller
- Otto Price
- Vince Gill

=== Pop ===
Pop/Contemporary Recorded Song of the Year

- "Be My Escape" – Relient K
- "Cry Out to Jesus" – Third Day
- "Held" – Natalie Grant
- "Hide" – Joy Williams
- "Lifesong" – Casting Crowns

Pop/Contemporary Album of the Year

- Awaken – Natalie Grant
- Genesis – Joy Williams
- Lifesong – Casting Crowns
- Redemption Songs – Jars of Clay
- Restored – Jeremy Camp

=== Rock ===
Rock Recorded Song of the Year

- "Lay Down My Pride" – Jeremy Camp
- "Let Go" – BarlowGirl
- "The Slam" – TobyMac (featuring T–Bone)
- "The Wait Is Over" – Disciple
- "Who I Am Hates Who I've Been" – Relient K

Rock Album of the Year

- All Gas. No Brake. – Stellar Kart
- Beauty From Pain – Superchick
- Disciple – Disciple
- Mmhmm – Relient K
- The Art of Breaking – Thousand Foot Krutch

Rock/Contemporary Recorded Song of the Year

- "Beautiful Love" – The Afters
- "Here is Our King" – David Crowder Band
- "I Can't Do This" – Plumb
- "Mirror" – BarlowGirl
- "Stars" – Switchfoot

Rock/Contemporary Album of the Year

- A Collision – David Crowder Band
- Another Journal Entry – BarlowGirl
- I Wish We All Could Win – The Afters
- Nothing is Sound – Switchfoot
- Wherever You Are – Third Day

=== Rap/Hip-Hop ===
Rap/Hip Hop Recorded Song of the Year

- "Are You Real?" – KJ-52 (featuring Kutless)
- "Love (So Beautiful)" – DJ Maj (featuring Liquid Beats)
- "Stereo" – 4th Avenue Jones
- "Trainwreck" – Mat Kearney
- "We Don't Play" – Grits (featuring Manchild)

Rap/Hip Hop Album of the Year

- Behind the Musik (A Boy Named Jonah) – KJ–52
- BoogiRoot – DJ Maj
- Dichotomy B – Grits
- Stereo: The Evolution of HipRockSoul – 4th Avenue Jones
- The Boy vs. The Cynic – John Reuben

=== Inspirational ===
Inspirational Recorded Song of the Year

- "All My Praise" – Selah
- "Days of Elijah" – Twila Paris
- "Holy Ground" – The Crabb Family
- "In Christ Alone" – Brian Littrell
- "Lay It Down" – Jaci Velasquez

Inspirational Album of the Year

- Believe – Natalie Grant
- Greatest Hymns – Selah
- Hymned, No. 1 – Bart Millard
- Life is a Church – David Phelps
- Rock of Ages... Hymns and Faith – Amy Grant

=== Gospel ===
Southern Gospel Recorded Song of the Year

- "Good Morning Lord" – Danny Johnathan Bond
- "Greater is He" – The Crabb Family
- "Long As I Got King Jesus" – Brian Free & Assurance
- "Not That You Died" – Legacy Five
- "Through the Fire" – The Crabb Family (featuring the Brooklyn Tabernacle Choir)

Southern Gospel Album of the Year

- Bill Gaither – Bill Gaither
- Common Thread – The Oak Ridge Boys
- Ernie Haase & Signature Sound – Ernie Haase & Signature Sound
- Live at Brooklyn Tabernacle – The Crabb Family
- Live in NYC – Brian Free & Assurance

Traditional Gospel Recorded Song of the Year

- "All Night" – Alvin Darling
- "Been So Good To Me" – The Mighty Clouds of Joy
- "God Blocked It" – Kurt Carr
- "I Know the Truth (Lies)" – Shirley Caesar (featuring Tonex)
- "We’ve Come to Magnify the Lord" – Rizen
- "Whatever You Want (God’s Got It)" – Chicago Mass Choir

Traditional Gospel Album of the Year

- Atom Bomb – Blind Boys of Alabama
- I Know the Truth – Shirley Caesar
- I Shall Not Be Moved – Rev. F.C. Barnes
- In the House of the Lord – The Mighty Clouds of Joy
- Live in Memphis, He Said It – Dottie Peoples
- Project Praise: Live in Atlanta – Chicago Mass Choir
- Rizen 2 – Rizen

Contemporary Gospel Recorded Song of the Year

- "Be Blessed" – Yolanda Adams
- "God Is Able" – Smokie Norful
- "I Will Find A Way" – Fred Hammond
- "Not Forgotten" – Israel & New Breed
- "Presence of the Lord" – Christ Tabernacle Choir

Contemporary Gospel Album of the Year

- Dream – BeBe Winans
- Mary Mary – Mary Mary
- Now Is The Time – Anointed
- Psalms, Hymns & Spiritual Songs – Donnie McClurkin
- When He Came – Martha Munizzi
- Worshipper – Darwin Hobbs

=== Country & Bluegrass ===
Country Recorded Song of the Year

- "Angels" – Randy Travis
- "Jesus, Take the Wheel" – Carrie Underwood
- "Mawmaw’s Song (In the Sweet By and By)" – Bart Millard
- "They Don’t Understand" – Sawyer Brown
- "When I Get Where I'm Going" – Brad Paisley (featuring Dolly Parton)

Country Album of the Year

- About You – Corey Brooks
- Count It All Joy – Susie Luchsinger
- Glory Train: Songs of Faith, Worship, and Praise – Randy Travis
- Perfect Love – McRaes
- Souls' Chapel – Marty Stuart & His Fabulous Superlatives

Bluegrass Recorded Song of the Year

- "A Living Prayer" – Alison Krauss & Union Station
- "Low and Down" – McRaes
- "One Rose" – The Lewis Family
- "There Is Power in the Blood" – Buddy Greene
- "Why Did I Wait So Long?" – Ricky Skaggs & Kentucky Thunder

Bluegrass Album of the Year

- Hymns & Prayer Songs – Buddy Greene
- New Beginnings – DEWgrass
- One Rose – The Lewis Family
- Shine On – Ralph Stanley
- So Glad – The Bradleys

=== Praise & Worship ===
Worship Song of the Year

- "Be Thou My Vision" – Selah
  - Traditional song
- "Blessed Be Your Name" – Newsboys
  - Matt Redman, Beth Redman, songwriters
- "Holy Is the Lord" – Chris Tomlin
  - Chris Tomlin, Louie Giglio, songwriters
- "How Great Is Our God" – Chris Tomlin
  - Chris Tomlin, Jesse Reeves, Ed Cash, songwriters
- "Indescribable" – Chris Tomlin
  - Laura Story, Jesse Reeves, songwriters
- "Strong Tower" – Kutless
  - Marc Byrd, Mark Lee, Aaron Sprinkle, Jon Micah Sumrall, songwriters

Praise & Worship Album of the Year

- Blessed Be Your Name: The Songs of Matt Redman Vol. 1 – Matt Redman
- Alive in South Africa – Israel & New Breed
- He Is Exalted (Live Worship) – Twila Paris
- Rescue (Live Worship) – NewSong
- Strong Tower – Kutless

=== Urban ===
Urban Recorded Song of the Year

- "A Brighter Day" – George Huff
- "Heaven" – Mary Mary
- "Jesus Will" – Antonio Neal
- "Looking for You" – Kirk Franklin
- "Pray" – CeCe Winans

Urban Album of the Year

- Charles and Taylor – Charles and Taylor
- Day by Day – Yolanda Adams
- Hero – Kirk Franklin
- Just Until... – Kierra "Kiki" Sheard
- Miracles – George Huff

=== Others ===
Instrumental Album of the Year

- Adonai – Hector David
- Life – Andy Hunter°
- Songs of Remembrance – Wayne Haun
- The Power of Your Love – Mark McClure
- Tribute to Bill and Gloria Gaither – Anthony Burger

Children's Music Album of the Year

- Absolute Modern Worship for Kids – Various
- Born to Worship: The Praise Baby Collection – Various
- Cedarmont Worship For Kids Volume 1 – Various
- Here I Am To Worship for Kids 2 – Various
- Jesus Is My Superhero – Hillsong
- King of the Jungle – Celeste Clydesdale

Spanish Language Album of the Year

- Adorar: Cantos de Alabanza y Adoracion – Various
- Brillas: Assiria Do Nascimiento – Miguel Villagran
- Dios es Bueno – Marcos Witt
- En Vivo desde Costa Rica – Funky
- Hip Hop y Reggaetón Constructivo – 7th Poet
- Leonardo – Leonardo
- Mi Propósito – Julissa

Special Event Album of the Year

- Come Let Us Adore Him (Essential Records)
- Happy Christmas Vol. 4 – (Tooth & Nail Records)
- Music Inspired by The Chronicles of Narnia: The Lion, the Witch and the Wardrobe (Sparrow Records)
- Passion: How Great is Our God – (sixstepsrecords/Sparrow Records)
- WOW Christmas: Green (Word Records)

Choral Collection of the Year

- Bigger Than Life – Michael Neale, Harold Ross, Jay Rouse
- Come, Let Us Adore Him – Lari Goss
- Great and Marvelous: Celebrating the Songs of Tommy Walker Vol. 2 – Tommy Walker, Bradley Knight
- Hymns (Classic Songs for Modern Worship) – Rob Howard, Scott Harris, Ken Barker
- Seasons of Praise – Carol Cymbala (Brooklyn Tabernacle Music)

Recorded Music Packaging of the Year

- Add to the Beauty – Sara Groves
- Life – Andy Hunter°
- Mmhmm – Relient K
- O God, the Aftermath – Norma Jean
- Redemption Songs – Jars of Clay
- The Boy vs. The Cynic – John Reuben
- The Everglow – Mae
- The Question – Emery
- You Can't Trust a Ladder – The Myriad

=== Musicals ===
Musical of the Year

- Amazing Grace
- Grace That Amazes
- Redemption: Power of the Cross
- Sing Joy
- Wondrous Gift

Youth/Children's Musical of the Year

- Christmas in Reverse
- Christmas Starr
- Extreme Christmas
- His Renown
- King of the Jungle

=== Videos ===
Short Form Music Video of the Year

- "Apparitions of Melody" – Kids in the Way
  - Blake McClure (video director), Tamera Brooks (video producer)
- "Be My Escape" – Relient K
  - Charles Jensen (video director), Rachel Curl (video producer)
- "Let This One Stay" – Dizmas
  - Kevin Anderson, Sam Stanton, Steelehouse Productions – Credential Recordings
- "Move" – Thousand Foot Krutch
  - Brandon Dickerson (video director), Erik Press (video producer)
- "Quien Sabe" – Kyosko
  - Oscar Frenkel (video director), Kyosko (video producers)
- "Stars" – Switchfoot
  - Scott Speer (video director), Coleen Haynes (video producer)

Long Form Music Video of the Year

- A Night of Stories & Songs – Mark Schultz
  - Franklin Films (director), Ken Carpenter (producer)
- Live at Brooklyn Tabernacle – The Crabb Family
  - Russell Hall (director), Aaron Crabb, Adam Crabb, Jason Crabb, Kelly Bowling, Brian Hudson, Kim Ryan White (producers)
- Live From Another Level – Israel & New Breed
  - Aaron Lindsey (director), Israel Houghton (producer)
- Live Wire – Third Day
  - Carl Diebold (director), Michael Sacci (producer)
- Stacie Orrico Live in Japan – Stacie Orrico
  - Jim Gable (director), Chris Kraft (producer)

== Artists with multiple nominations and awards ==
The following artists received multiple nominations:

- Nine: Chris Tomlin
- Six: David Crowder Band, Natalie Grant, Joy Williams, Relient K
- Five: Casting Crowns, The Crabb Family, Jeremy Camp, Switchfoot, BarlowGirl, Third Day, Israel & New Breed
- Three: The Afters, David Crowder Band, Kutless, Mark Hall, Selah
- Two: Ernie Haase & Signature Sound, Mat Kearney, Stellar Kart, David Phelps, Amy Grant, Jars of Clay, Disciple, Thousand Foot Krutch, KJ-52, DJ Maj, 4th Avenue Jones, GRITS, John Reuben, Twila Paris, Bart Millard, Brian Free & Assurance, Yolanda Adams, Mary Mary, Randy Travis, McRaes, The Lewis Family, Buddy Greene, Matt Redman, Kirk Franklin, George Huff, Andy Hunter°

The following artists received multiple awards:

- Four: Chris Tomlin
- Two: Casting Crowns, David Crowder Band, The Crabb Family, Kirk Franklin
