= Lonely Nation =

Song by Switchfoot

from the album Nothing Is Sound
- Released: 2005
- Recorded: 2005
- Genre: Alternative rock, post-grunge
- Length: 3:44
- Label: Sony BMG
- Songwriter(s): Jon Foreman; Tim Foreman
- Producer(s): John Fields

"Lonely Nation" is a song by the rock group Switchfoot. It is the first track on the 2005 record, Nothing Is Sound.

== Song history ==
Switchfoot frontman Jon Foreman, had this to say about the song:

"Desperate times call for desperate measures. Over the course our time on the road as a band I have met so many amazing, beautiful, desperate, lonely people. We are the lonely nation. We are the disenchanted, the disillusioned- we are the remnant of lonely souls wanting more than anything that we can buy with this cold, hard cash. I wrote this song while we were playing a stretch of rock radio shows. I'd walk around near the back and just breathe in the loneliness- masses of lonely, scared kids. I remember thinking about the irony. Here you have this connected generation of online communities, IM, TM, myspace, and cell phones that grows more and more lonely every day. This is a song is still yearning, saying, "Don't settle, please, don't give up. Fight for only the true and the beautiful!" We wanted to start the record with this track because we feel that this song picks up where Meant to Live left off. There is hope for meaning and truth in this life but it probably doesn't come in the form of a corporate slogan. We, the target market, want more than this world has to offer. This is a song where Tim and Chad drive the verses and the guitars take the chorus. We've played this song many times live and refined it quite a bit from its original state. There's nothing like playing a new song in front of real people with real opinions. The people at those shows, (the extended Switchfoot family), they shaped this song as much as anyone."

== As a single ==
The song was slated to be released as the follow-up single to the 2005 hit Stars, but was pulled by the band's label, Sony BMG before release.

A portion of a music video was also shot for the song, but the full video was never completed. Clips from the video can be found during a montage on Switchfoot's popular self-made DVD, Switchfootage 2.
