= All This for a King: The Essential Collection =

Compilation album by David Crowder Band
- Released: May 21, 2013
- Genre: Contemporary Christian music, modern worship
- Length: 62:35
- Label: sixsteps
- Producer: David Crowder* Band; Ed Cash; Zach Lind; Brent Milligan; Charlie Peacock; Christopher Stevens; Tedd T

David Crowder Band chronology
Give Us Rest (2012)	All This for a King: The Essential Collection (2013)

All This for a King: The Essential Collection is the only compilation album and the twelfth and final album overall by contemporary Christian music group the David Crowder Band, released on May 21, 2013 by sixstepsrecords. The album was produced by the band. This album received critical acclamation and commercial viability.

== Critical reception ==
Professional ratings
Review scores
Source	Rating
CCM Magazine	4/5 stars
Christian Music Review	4.5/5 stars
Christian Music Zine	4.5/5 stars
CM Addict	4/5 stars
Indie Vision Music	3/5 stars
Jesus Freak Hideout	3.5/5 stars
Louder Than the Music	5/5 stars
New Release Tuesday	4/5 stars
Worship Leader	4.5/5 stars

All This for a King: The Essential Collection garnered critical acclaim from music critics. At CCM Magazine, Andy Argyrakis gave it four stars writing that "While all the major singles are present, added value comes with a trio of electronically-leaning remixes, plus the new, acoustic folk hand clapper 'This I Know,' all of which showcase Crowder's complacency shattering lyrics." Jonathan Francesco of New Release Tuesday gave it four stars calling them "a solid collection of hits". At Worship Leader, Jason Whitehorn gave it four-and-a-half stars affirming how the listener will "get what you expect, except this time all in one place."

Alex "Tincan" Caldwell of Jesus Freak Hideout gave it three-and-a-half stars stating that he would give them a five star career rating, however "For this collection, however, they earn slightly less." At Christian Music Review, Jay Heilman gave it four-and-a-half stars noting that "For the most part, The Essential Collection does a good job of covering this, though it covers exclusively the radio hits." Joshua Andre of Christian Music Zine gave it four-and-a-half stars believing that "All This For A King: The Essential Collection embodies the band’s most famous hits and gives us a bittersweet farewell, and a exciting look at what is to come."

At CM Addict, Andrew Funderburk rated it four stars evoking that "Though this album may feel like goodbye, it is the opening of new doors for greater things to come." Jono Davies of Louder Than the Music rated it a perfect five stars alluding to how he could talk endlessly about each track, however writing "What I will say is that this is a brilliant greatest hits album, with every song being as strong as the next." At Indie Vision Music, Jonathan Andre gave it the only mixed rating at three stars highlighting and cautioning that "With only 14 tracks, there are songs bound to miss out, and some songs chosen over others that I would’ve thought were more worthy."

== Commercial performance ==
For the Billboard charting week of June 8, 2013, All This for a King: The Essential Collection was the No. 70 most sold album in the United States by The Billboard 200, and it was the No. 3 most sold album in the Christian market via the Christian Albums charting.

== Track listing ==
No.	Title	Writer(s)	Original studio recording on	Length
1.	"O Praise Him (All This for a King)"	David Crowder	Illuminate	5:48
2.	"Our Love Is Loud (Can You Hear Us)"	Crowder	Can You Hear Us?	4:47
3.	"Open Skies"	Crowder	Illuminate	3:58
4.	"Here Is Our King"	Crowder	A Collision	3:53
5.	"Wholly Yours"	Crowder	A Collision	4:33
6.	"How He Loves" (radio edit)	John Mark McMillan	Church Music	4:05
7.	"You Alone"	Crowder, Jack Parker	The Lime CD	5:38
8.	"Everything Glorious"	Crowder	Remedy	3:51
9.	"The Glory of it All"	Crowder	Remedy	5:16
10.	"SMS (Shine)" (radio version)	Crowder, Parker	Church Music	3:45
11.	"Shadows – Family Force 5" (Phenomenon remix)	Crowder	Church Music	3:42
12.	"After All (Holy)" (Capital Kings remix)	Crowder, Mike Dodson, Matt Maher, Mark Waldrop	Give Us Rest	4:40
13.	"No One Like You" (The Digital Age remix)	Jeremy Bush, Crowder, Dodson, Mike Hogan, Parker, Jason Solley	Sunsets & Sushi	4:35
14.	"This I Know"	Crowder, Seth Philpott	New Track	4:04
Total length:				62:35

== Charts ==
Chart (2013)	Peak position
US Billboard 200	70
US Top Christian Albums (Billboard)	3
