= Summer Happiness =

EP by David Crowder Band
- Released: June 22, 2010
- Genres: Christian rock, contemporary worship music
- Length: 14:06
- Label: sixsteps

David Crowder Band chronology
Church Music (2009)	Summer Happiness (2010)	Oh for Joy (2011)

Summer Happiness is the third and final EP by the David Crowder Band, released on June 22, 2010 by sixstepsrecords. It consists of acoustic renditions of tracks from their previous album, Church Music. The album was met with positive reviews and commercial viability.

== Background ==
Summer Happiness released on June 22, 2010 by sixstepsrecords, and it contains four acoustic versions of songs off of the Church Music album. The EP was the last ever for David Crowder Band and the third one for their history.

== Critical reception ==
Professional ratings
Review scores
Source	Rating
Jesus Freak Hideout	4/5 stars
Louder Than the Music	4/5 stars

Summer Happiness received two positive reviews from music critics. At Jesus Freak Hideout, Scott Fryberger gave it four stars calling it a "real treat" for those who like Church Music, and noting how it was "A win-win situation" because "With the cost of this EP being so low (in addition to the songs being terrific renditions), there's no real reason not to pick this one up." Jono Davies writing for Louder Than the Music gave it four stars stating that "Dave Crowder Band have worked hard to put these songs together and for them to still sound full and interesting." In addition, Davies noting that "It's great to hear different versions of these well known songs from the amazing album Church Music", and that "If you fancy some clever acoustic songs done to a high quality maybe it's time for some Summer Happiness."

== Commercial performance ==
For the Billboard charting week of July 10, 2010, Summer Happiness was the No. 105 most album sold in the United States by The Billboard 200 charting. In addition, the album was the No. 5 most sold Christian Album in the nation that very same week. The album was the No. 14 most sold Digital Album and the No. 98 most sold on the Top Current Albums chart the same week.

== Track listing ==
Album release
No.	Title	Writer(s)	Length
1.	"Alleluia, Sing" (Acoustic)	David Crowder	4:31
2.	"How He Loves" (Acoustic)	John Mark McMillan	3:38
3.	"Oh, Happiness" (Acoustic)	David Crowder, Jack Parker	2:36
4.	"Shadows" (Acoustic)	David Crowder	3:21
Total length:			14:06

== Charts ==
Chart (2010)	Peak position
US Billboard 200	105
US Top Christian Albums (Billboard)	5
