= Remedy Club Tour – Live =

Remedy Club Tour - Live

Live album by David Crowder Band
- Released: August 19, 2008
- Genres: Christian rock, modern worship
- Labels: sixsteps, Sparrow
- Producer: David Crowder Band

David Crowder Band chronology
Remedy (2007)	Remedy Club Tour - Live (2008)	Church Music (2009)

Professional ratings
Review scores
Source	Rating
AllMusic	4.5/5 stars
CCM Magazine	4.5/5 stars
Christian Broadcasting Network	3/5 spins
The Christian Manifesto	3.5/5 stars
Christian Music Review	4.5/5 stars
Cross Rhythms	10/10 squares
Jesus Freak Hideout	4/5 stars
The Phantom Tollbooth	5/5 stars

Remedy Club Tour – Live is a second live album/DVD and eighth overall by American band David Crowder Band. The album was released on August 19, 2008. It was recorded live on the band's club tour across America, which took place after the release of their album Remedy.

== Track listing ==
Album release
No.	Title	Writer(s)	Original studio recording on	Length
1.	"I’m Trying to Make You Sing"	David Crowder, Ralph Vaughan Williams	A Collision	2:48
2.	"The Glory of It All"	Crowder	Remedy	5:07
3.	"Can You Feel It?"	Jeremy Bush, Crowder, Michael Dodson	Remedy	5:02
4.	"Everything Glorious"	Crowder	Remedy	3:35
5.	"...Neverending..."	Bush, Crowder, Mike Hogan, Jack Parker	Remedy	3:15
6.	"Here is Our King"	Crowder	A Collision	4:10
7.	"You Are My Joy"	Crowder	A Collision	5:52
8.	"We Won’t Be Quiet"	Crowder, Hogan, Parker	Remedy	4:24
9.	"Foreverandever Etc..."	Crowder, Dodson, Parker	A Collision	5:23
10.	"A Beautiful Collision"	Crowder, Parker	A Collision	4:30
11.	"Never Let Go"	Crowder, Dodson, Hogan	Remedy	5:36
12.	"Remedy"	Crowder	Remedy	5:30
13.	"I Saw the Light"	Crowder, Johnny Cash, Hank Williams Sr.	A Collision	2:45
14.	"No One Like You"	Crowder	Illuminate	4:20
15.	"O Praise Him (All This for a King)"	Crowder	Illuminate	5:39
16.	"Surely We Can Change"	Crowder	Remedy	5:11
Total length:				73:07

== Chart positions ==
Chart (2007–2008)	Peak position
Billboard 200	88
Billboard Hot Christian Albums	5

== Awards ==
In 2009, the album was nominated for a Dove Award for Recorded Music Packaging of the Year at the 40th GMA Dove Awards.
