= Latonius =

American musician, singer, songwriter, choir director, and author

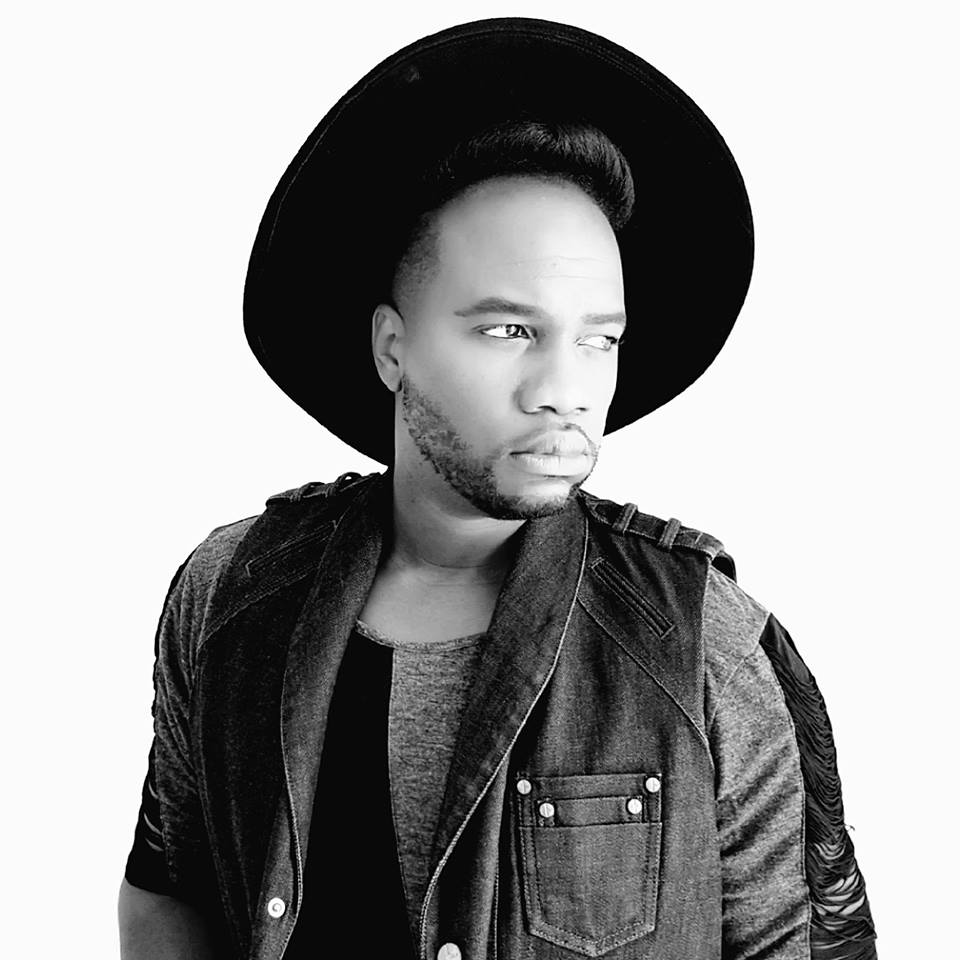
- Latonius in 2017

Background information
- Born: Tony Jermaine Earl; April 30, 1981 (age 45); Milwaukee, Wisconsin, U.S.
- Origin: Tenerife, Canary Islands, Spain
- Genres: Pop; Rock; Soul; Gospel
- Occupations: Singer, songwriter, choir director, author
- Instruments: Vocals, piano
- Years active: 2001–present
- Label: NCR Music
- Website: www.latonius.com

Tony Jermaine Earl (born April 30, 1981), known professionally as Latonius, is an American musician, singer, songwriter, choir director, and author. He is known for his work in pop, soul, and gospel music, as well as for directing gospel choirs internationally.

== Career ==
Latonius began his musical career in the United States and later developed an international career across Europe, particularly in Germany, France, and Spain. In 2013, he released his debut album Say Yes.

=== Television ===
In 2014, Latonius appeared on the German television show Rising Star, performing before a large audience and being evaluated by artists including Anastacia, Gentleman, Sasha, and Joy Denalane.

=== International gospel work ===
Between 2011 and 2015, Latonius was based in Hamburg, Germany, where he directed the Leviticus Gospel Choir. During this period, he also led gospel workshops in the Hamburg region, including events documented by local institutions.

He has continued to lead gospel workshops and choir projects internationally, including in Germany and France.

In France, he has been involved in gospel performances in the Provence region, including concerts in Marseille such as the “Noël Gospel” program at Cepac Silo, where he is credited as choir director.

He has also participated in large-scale gospel concerts in cities such as Nice, performing with choir ensembles prepared for live events.

=== Spain and Canary Islands ===
Latonius later established part of his activity in Spain, particularly in the Canary Islands, where he has directed gospel choir projects and participated in festivals and concerts.

He has been featured in the Gospel Canarias Festival alongside international artists such as Chicago Mass Choir and Joshua Nelson.

His choir projects have performed in various municipalities in Tenerife, including Adeje and El Rosario.

He has also participated in cultural programming and events organized by local institutions in the Canary Islands.

His musical releases, including the album The Vision, have also been covered by cultural media in the Canary Islands.

== Discography ==
=== Albums ===
- 2012: Never Too Late
- 2013: Home
- 2013: Say Yes – Deluxe Edition
- 2018: The Vision
- 2021: Intimacy
- 2024: Infinity

=== Singles ===
- 2017: "Life of a Champion"
- 2017: "Up on a Hill"
- 2018: "Lift Him Up"
- 2018: "Sanador (Healer)"
- 2019: "Magic of Xmas"
- 2020: "Blessings Come Down"
- 2020: "Free"
- 2021: "Back 2 Soul"
- 2021: "The Little Drummer Boy"
- 2023: "You Never Knew Me"
- 2024: "Infinity"
- 2025: "The Gift Of You"
