= Give Us Rest =

Studio album by David Crowder Band
- Released: January 10, 2012
- Recorded: 2011
- Genres: Christian rock, worship
- Length: 100:42
- Label: sixsteps
- Producer: David Crowder Band

David Crowder Band chronology
| Oh for Joy (2011) | Give Us Rest (2012) | All This for a King: The Essential Collection (2013) |

Singles from Give Us Rest; or, A Requiem Mass in C (the Happiest of All Keys)
- 1. "Let Me Feel You Shine" Released: 2011; 2. "After All (Holy)" Released: 2012

Give Us Rest; or, A Requiem Mass in C (the Happiest of All Keys) is the sixth and final studio album and their eleventh overall album release from the David Crowder Band. This album was released on January 10, 2012 through sixstepsrecords. The album charted at the following during the week of January 28, 2012: No. 1 on the Billboard Christian Albums chart, No. 2 on both the Billboard 200 and Digital Albums charts. The first single to come from the album is "Let Me Feel You Shine".

== Musical style ==
Give Us Rest follows the former sextet's applauded Church Music, in which every track was infused with more electronic textures than used before. Critically, it was met with various descriptors for the songs' sounds, including techno, progressive rock, experimental, and even disco-rock, which was attributed to the 13th track "Church Music - Dance (!)".

However, Jesus Freak Hideout's Michael Weaver hailed Give Us Rest as "the most diverse thing DC*B has released in one collection." A sentence earlier, he dubbed it "a masterpiece", a statement which various Christian music reviewers echoed radiantly.

He noted it for consisting of "everything from the standard DC*B modern alt-worship you're accustomed to, as well as classical sounding pieces, shredding guitars, folk, bluegrass, a hint of Southern gospel, and a couple nicely covered hymns."

Country and Southern-tinged tracks appear here that were scarce in the electronica of Church Music. Paul S. Ganney of Cross Rhythms found "I Am A Seed" "country-rock tinged." Michael Weaver noted "Jesus, Lead Me to Your Healing Waters" as having "a Southern rock feel" and "Leaning on the Everlasting Arms" "a bluegrass feel."

== Composition ==
Give Us Rest ranks as the lengthiest David Crowder*Band studio album at nearly 101 minutes, overtaking Church Music's 74 minutes. Physically consisting of 2 compact discs, AllMusic's James Christopher Monger would name it the sextet's "swan song."

While Church Music and one of its predecessors A Collision or (3+4=7) contained two cover songs, Give Us Rest contains four covers.

=== Disc one ===
Six tracks on disc one were written solely by David Crowder:

- Track #1: "Requiem Aeternam Dona Eis, Domine"
- Track #2: "Lux Aeternam Shine"
- Track #5: "God Have Mercy (Kyrie Eleison)"
- Track #7: "Fall On Your Knees"
- Track #10: "Reprise #1"
- Track #19: "Sequence 6"

The other 13 (excluding one cover) were written with bandmates and collaborator Matt Maher.

The second track "Oh Great God, Give Us Rest" is Disc 1's first and final track to contain writing contributions from Canadian CWM musician Matt Maher.

The sixth track "Why Me?" is the record's first cover. Written by actor and country singer-songwriter Kris Kristofferson, it originally appeared as the last track on his 1972 record Jesus Was a Capricorn.

After the 13th track, an interlude simply tilted "Interlude" written by bass guitarist and keyboardist Mike Dodson, is a series of "Sequences" commence, containing seven instrumental tracks.

== Reception ==
=== Critical ===
Professional ratings
Review scores
| Source | Rating |
|---|---|
| Allmusic | 4/5 stars |
| CCM Magazine | 5/5 stars |
| The Christian Manifesto | 5/5 stars |
| Christian Music Zine | 4.5/5 stars |
| Christianity Today | 4/5 stars |
| Cross Rhythms | 9/10 squares |
| Indie Vision Music | 4/5 stars |
| Jesus Freak Hideout | 5/5 stars 4.5/5 stars |
| Louder Than the Music | 4/5 stars |
| New Release Tuesday | 4.5/5 stars |
| The Phantom Tollbooth | 4.5/5 stars |

The album Give Us Rest has received nearly universal acclaim.

CCM Magazine, The Christian Manifesto, and Jesus Freak Hideout's Ryan Barbee all gave the album 5 out of 5 stars. Matt Conner of CCM Magazine commented on how the album "starts with footsteps of those walking to church and closes with the familiar hymn 'Because He Lives'", noting that "in between are emotional and musical shifts that rise and fall at all the right times." The Christian Manifesto's Lydia Akinola called the album "a triumphant finish!" She went on to say that the album "is a masterpiece, one that totally eclipses what many thought was possible." Ryan Barbee of Jesus Freak Hideout heaped praise on the album, saying "there is no doubt that they have created something grander and more elaborate than all of their previous releases", and that each track "back[s] up this statement" and that the album "is nothing short of an amazing experience."

Christian Music Zine's Tyler Hess rated the album 4.5 out of 5 stars and gave the band and album praise, commenting that the band "went out without holding anything back, putting an exclamation mark on their career". He noted this album showed "the talent, skill, dedication and hard work put into [it]" and called it "one final masterpiece". Paul S. Ganney of Cross Rhythms rated the album 9 out of 10 squares and described the album as "finish[ing] with a flourish", but advised that the "lyrics tend towards the liturgical" and that he couldn't "see many church choirs managing to tackle them successfully." Ganney noted that each track "follow[s] a well-defined route thematically, but always with the underlying truth: no matter how close to the edge we may sail (and even over it) God can bring us back." Jesus Freak Hideout's Michael Weaver gave the album 4.5 out of 5 and called the album a "masterpiece" but cautioned that the album "just doesn't contain enough sing-a-long type songs to make a very effective worship album", and commented that "a few wasted tracks of noise, filler, or spoken word keep this album from the perfect rating it was so close to." New Release Tuesday's Marcus Hathcock also rated the album 4.5 out of 5, writing that "while you may not resonate with every song on this album, it's absolutely safe to say that there is something for everyone on Give Us Rest" and that "Crowder has given us a beautiful, long goodbye that'll satisfy us for years to come." Derek Walker of The Phantom Tollbooth rated the album 4.5 out of 5 as well and stressed that we should give "credit to Crowder for stopping the band at the top of its game, rather than clinging on and regurgitating more of the same."

The album was rated 4 out of 5 stars by Allmusic, Christianity Today, Indie Vision Music and Louder Than the Music. Ron Augustine of Christianity Today wrote that the album "sounds exactly as a 'final album' should. It is a Mount Everest of worship rock albums, never to be topped." Indie Vision Music's Joshua Hedlund wrote "they went all out for their last hurrah. There's something for everyone in this double-disc opus, from corporate worship anthems to personal prayers to instrumental jams spanning a wide range of dynamics." Hedlund wrote that "from the opening chimes to the closing hymns, it's almost too much, and you probably won't want to listen to all of it all the time, but you'll definitely want to explore it all year long." Jono Davies of Louder Than the Music called the album "a piece of musical art" and "a truly stunning piece of music" that "will be enjoyed by everyone who hears it." At Allmusic, James Christopher Monger wrote that the release "finds the sextet firing on all cylinders, offering up an elaborate two-disc swan song that stays true to their modern worship vision while elevating it to a whole new level." Finally, Monger felt that "one would be hard-pressed to not find something to love here".

Zach of Alpha Omega News graded the album an (A+), and wrote that "Overall, what David Crowder and his band have created here is a fantastic collection of worshipful anthems, each able to stand up on its own, while each having a similarity to the other that never fails to share the love of God with the listener. It is a concept album in a way, if you pay attention to its lengthy subtitle and how many of the songs celebrate the life and death of Jesus. Even if the band was never quite your cup of tea in the past, I advise you not to pass up on this album. Not only is it a masterpiece in Christian music alone, but also sure to be the year's very best." Jeremy Dunn of Gospel Music Channel wrote that the album is "the band's most extensive body of music to date", in which "the listener is taken through the poetic patterns of this time-honored liturgical funeral mass, not for the sole purpose of mourning but also to celebrate what has passed."

=== Commercial performance ===
The album debuted at No. 2 on the US Billboard 200, selling 51,000 copies. The next week, the album fell to No. 23, selling 11,744 copies.

== Track listing ==
Disc one
| No. | Title | Writer(s) | Length |
|---|---|---|---|
| 1. | "Requiem Aeternam Dona Eis, Domine" | David Crowder | 0:54 |
| 2. | "Oh Great God, Give Us Rest" | Crowder, Matt Maher | 3:27 |
| 3. | "Lux Aeternam Shine" | Crowder | 0:53 |
| 4. | "Come Find Me" | Jeremy Bush, Crowder, Jack Parker | 4:54 |
| 5. | "God Have Mercy (Kyrie Eleison)" | Crowder | 5:16 |
| 6. | "Why Me?" | Kris Kristofferson | 2:15 |
| 7. | "Fall On Your Knees" | Crowder | 3:59 |
| 8. | "A Burial" | Mike Hogan | 1:08 |
| 9. | "Let Me Feel You Shine" | Crowder, Mark Waldrop | 4:20 |
| 10. | "Reprise #1" | Crowder | 1:11 |
| 11. | "Blessedness of Everlasting Light" | Crowder, Hogan | 4:19 |
| 12. | "The Sound of Light" | Mike Dodson | 1:15 |
| 13. | "Interlude" | Dodson | 0:52 |
| 14. | "Sequence 1" | Crowder, Waldrop | 2:29 |
| 15. | "Sequence 2" | Waldrop | 2:16 |
| 16. | "Sequence 3" | Hogan | 2:19 |
| 17. | "Sequence 4" | Dodson, Waldrop | 3:27 |
| 18. | "Sequence 5" | Parker | 3:01 |
| 19. | "Sequence 6" | Crowder | 1:23 |
| 20. | "Sequence 7" | Bush, Crowder | 1:40 |

Disc two
| No. | Title | Writer(s) | Length |
|---|---|---|---|
| 1. | "Reprise #2" | Crowder | 1:16 |
| 2. | "Oh My God" | Crowder, Waldrop | 2:45 |
| 3. | "I Am a Seed" | Dodson, Waldrop | 2:48 |
| 4. | "After All (Holy)" | Crowder, Dodson, Maher, Waldrop | 4:36 |
| 5. | "The Great Amen" | Bush, Crowder, Waldrop | 1:18 |
| 6. | "There Is a Sound" | Crowder | 5:45 |
| 7. | "Oh, Great Love of God" | Crowder, Maher, Waldrop | 4:01 |
| 8. | "Our Communion" | Crowder, Maher, Parker | 3:56 |
| 9. | "Sometimes" | Crowder | 4:40 |
| 10. | "A Return" | Crowder, Waldrop | 2:19 |
| 11. | "Oh, My God I’m Coming Home" | Dodson | 2:43 |
| 12. | "Leaning on the Everlasting Arms / 'Tis So Sweet to Trust in Jesus" | Traditional | 4:45 |
| 13. | "Jesus, Lead Me to Your Healing Waters" | Crowder, Dodson, Hogan, Parker, Waldrop | 4:15 |
| 14. | "Because He Lives" | Bill Gaither, Gloria Gaither | 4:21 |
| Total length: | | | 100:42 |

== Personnel ==
David Crowder*Band

- David Crowder – vocals, acoustic piano, programming, acoustic guitars, electric guitars, stomping
- Jack Parker – acoustic piano, Rhodes electric piano, programming, electric guitars, banjo, stomping, vocals, co-lead vocals on "Sequence 5"
- Mark Waldrop – programming, electric guitars, mandolin, glockenspiel, stomping, vocals, co-lead vocals on “Sequence 4”
- Mike Dodson – acoustic piano, programming, banjo, bass guitar, clarinet, various horns, cello, stomping, backing vocals
- Mike Hogan – programming, violin, vinyls, stomping
- B-Wack – drums, programming, various electronic objects, stomping

Additional musicians

- Christopher Stevens – programming (7, 27), arrangements (7, 27)
- Josh Moore – programming (29), arrangements (29)
- Chris August – stomping
- John Mark McMillan – stomping
- Steven Samuels – stomping
- Jack Abell – priest (voice actor)

Bluegrass sing-along singers

- Tye Barrett, John Bernhart, Wes Butler, Teal Dodrill, Kaley Eggers, Lauren Eggers, Monike Garabieta, Travis Harsch, Andrew Hulett, KC Kennicutt, Adair McGregor, Jameson McGregor, Matt O'Brien, Dan Padgett, Caleb Roberts, Jacob Robinson, Joshua Stone and Austin Tiffany

Mass Choir (Tracks 3, 15 & 25)

- LouAnna Arterburn, Wes Butler, Krista Dalton, Joshua Davis, Josh Dunn, Stacy Dunn, Kerry Etheridge, Andi Fuentes, Christina Gibson, Brandon Keys, Elliot Lee, Misti Lehman, Carrie Livesay, JR Pershall, Joy Pershall Neely, Adrielle Selke, Carolyn Still, Dawn Wible and Blake Willis – choir singers
- Brett Mills and Emily Mills – choir direction

== Production ==
- Louie Giglio – executive producer
- Shelley Giglio – executive producer, art direction, management
- Brad O'Donnell – executive producer
- David Crowder*Band – producers, recording
- Casey Giesson – field recordings (cathedral, car and funeral sounds)
- Shane D. Wilson – mixing at Pentavarit (Nashville, Tennessee)
- Stephen Marcussen – mastering at Marcussen Mastering (Hollywood, California)
- Jess Chambers – A&R administration
- Jan Cook – art direction
- Leighton Ching – art direction, design
- Toni Crowder – design
- Reid Rolls – photography
- Mike McCloskey – management

== Charts ==
=== Weekly charts ===
| Chart (2011) | Peak position |
|---|---|
| Canadian Albums Chart | 32 |
| US Billboard 200 | 2 |
| US Billboard Digital Albums | 2 |
| US Billboard Christian Albums | 1 |

=== Year-end charts ===
Year-end
| Chart (2012) | Position |
|---|---|
| Billboard Christian Albums | 14 |
