= Hymned Again =

Studio album by Bart Millard
- Released: August 19, 2008
- Studios: Dark Horse Recording (Franklin, Tennessee); Townsend Sound Studios (Nashville, Tennessee)
- Genres: CCM, Christian rock
- Label: INO
- Producers: Brown Bannister; Bart Millard

Bart Millard chronology
Hymned, No. 1 (2005)	Hymned Again (2008)

Professional ratings
Review scores
Source	Rating
Allmusic	3.5/5 stars
Jesus Freak Hideout	2/5 stars
Christian Music Review	(B+)

Hymned Again is the second solo album from MercyMe singer Bart Millard. Like his previous effort, Hymned, No. 1, the album features modern takes on popular Christian hymns. The album was released on August 19, 2008. Country singer Vince Gill, again makes a collaboration on the song "Jesus Cares for Me". The album also features vocals by Christy Nockels (from Watermark).

== Track listing ==
1. "Stand Up, Stand Up for Jesus" (George Duffield Jr., George James Webb) - 2:59
2. "What a Day That Will Be" (Jim Hill) - 3:50
3. "I Saw the Light" (Hank Williams) - 3:37
4. "What a Friend We Have in Jesus" (Charles Converse, Joseph M. Scriven) - 3:41
5. "I Stand Amazed" (featuring Christy Nockels) (Charles H. Gabriel) - 4:04
6. "Jesus Cares for Me" (featuring Vince Gill) (Thad Cockrell, Bart Millard) - 3:58
7. "Victory in Jesus" (Eugene Monroe Bartlett) - 3:36
8. "Brethren We Have Met to Worship" (George Atkins, William Moore) - 3:47
9. "Leaning on the Everlasting Arms" (Hoffman, Showalter) - 3:05
10. "Down at the Cross" (Hoffman, Stockton) - 4:05
11. "Grace That Is Greater" (Johnston, Towner) - 2:59

== Personnel ==
- Bart Millard – vocals, backing vocals (7, 10)
- Blair Masters – acoustic piano, keyboards, Hammond B3 organ
- Barry Graul – acoustic guitar, electric guitars
- Jerry McPherson – acoustic guitar, electric guitars, banjo, saw
- Ilya Toshinsky – dobro (3), acoustic guitar (5, 8)
- Paul Franklin – steel guitar (5), dobro (8), lap steel guitar (10)
- Gordon Kennedy – ukulele (11)
- Chris Donohue – bass
- Dan Needham – drums, percussion
- Eric Darken – percussion (4)
- Sam Levine – clarinet (1, 4)
- Mel Chance – alto saxophone (2, 7), clarinet (4)
- Michael Kemp – baritone saxophone (2, 7), tenor saxophone (2, 7)
- Kenn Hughes – trombone (4, 7)
- Denver Bierman – trumpet (2, 4, 7)
- Scott Steward – trumpet (2, 7)
- Buddy Greene – harmonica (3)
- Andrea Zonn – fiddle (8), backing vocals (8)
- Missi Hale – backing vocals (2)
- Michael Mellett – backing vocals (3)
- Anthony Evans – backing vocals (5, 10)
- Christy Nockels – backing vocals (5, 11)
- Tim Davis – backing vocals (7)
- Jon Randall – backing vocals (8)

== Production ==
- Brown Bannister – producer, overdub recording
- Bart Millard – co-producer
- Steve Bishir – track recording, overdub recording, mixing
- Kent Hooper – overdub recording, digital editing
- Billy Whittington – overdub recording, digital editing
- Taylor Harris – digital editing
- Ron Robinson – digital editing
- Chance Scoggins – digital editing
- Doug Sax – mastering at The Mastering Lab (Ojai, California)
- Shatrine Krake – design, layout
- Mark Nicholas – photography

== Awards ==
Hymned Again was nominated for a Grammy Award for Best Southern, Country, or Bluegrass Gospel Album at the 51st Grammy Awards. It was also nominated for a Dove Award for Country Album of the Year at the 40th GMA Dove Awards.

== Chart performance ==
The album peaked at #126 on Billboard 200 and #8 on Billboard's Christian Albums.
