= Randy Miller (musician) =

American rock drummer

Randall J. Miller (February 9, 1971 – November 5, 2010) was an American musician and drummer for the Seattle-based band, The Myriad.

Miller was born in Long Beach, California in 1971 to Jack and Jayne Miller. He moved to Redding, California, in 1985 with his family. Miller graduated from Central Valley High School in Redding in 1989. He initially owned and operated Metolius Construction, a concrete business, with business partner, Tommy Carlson, before leaving to join The Myriad in 2006.

The Myriad, which included Miller as drummer and lead vocalist Jeremy Edwardson, who was also a 1997 alumnus of Central Valley High School, rose to success after winning MTV's Dew Circuit Breakout Band of the Year in December 2007. Their 2008 second album, With Arrows, With Poise, was released shortly afterwards after being mastered at Abbey Road Studios.

Miller was diagnosed with mesenchymal chondrosarcoma, a form of bone cancer, in 2008, the same year that With Arrows, With Poise was released. He underwent treatments, including chemotherapy, and his condition improved enough that he was able to tour with The Myriad during the autumn of 2009.

== Death ==
Randy Miller died at his home in Redding, California on November 5, 2010, at the age of 39. He is survived by his wife, Kristyn Miller and their two children.
