= Alvin Darling =

- Also known as: Pastor Alvin Darling
- Born: Alvin A. Darling; December 23, 1948 (age 77); Newark, New Jersey
- Origin: Cranford, New Jersey
- Genres: Gospel, traditional black gospel
- Occupations: Singer, songwriter
- Instruments: Vocals, singer-songwriter
- Years active: 1990–present
- Labels: Savoy, CGI, Emtro

Alvin A. Darling (born December 23, 1948) is an American gospel musician. Five of his albums charted on the Billboard Gospel Albums chart, and two on the Heatseekers Albums chart. He has also been nominated at the GMA Dove Awards and the Stellar Awards.

== Early life and pastoral ministry ==
Darling was born in Newark, New Jersey, as Alvin A. Darling on December 23, 1948, yet his birth parents refused to raise him, so his grandmother, Lilla Darling, took him to raise. He was first reared in the church at Smith Memorial Church of God in Christ Church by his grandmother in his hometown. Later in his teenage years, Darling attended Deliverance Evangelistic Center, where the pastor was Rev. A. Skinner, and this was where he became a believer in Jesus Christ.

He joined Greater Mt. Zion Holy Church, located in Cranford, New Jersey, which was being pastored by Bishop Charlie W. Bullock, and this is where he was called to become a minister in 1979. Darling would serve as one of their associate ministers, until he was installed as the lead pastor in October 2001. He now is the lead pastor of two churches, the aforementioned one, along with Old Ship of Zion Church located in Center Moriches, New York.

== Music career ==
His music recording career commenced in 1990, with the release of two albums, I've Learned to Put My Trust in God and Expect a Miracle on October 17, 1990, by Savoy Gospel Records, yet both failed to chart. The subsequent album, Medley of Praise, was released in 1992 by I Am Records, and it was his breakthrough released upon the Billboard Gospel Albums at No. 26. He released, Hold On...To The Promise, on September 13, 1994, by CGI Records, but it did not chart. His next release, There's an Answer in Prayer, was released by Savoy Gospel Records on January 17, 1995, however it did not place on any charts.

in 1996, Darling contributed to the Academy Award-winning 1996 soundtrack for the film The Preacher's Wife, which has gone on to become the best-selling gospel album of all time. Whitney Houston's cover of Darling's song "He's All Over Me" was one of the more popular songs on the album.

The album, Blessing Coming Through for You, was released on September 15, 1998, and it performed with no chart placements. His subsequent release, You Deserve My Worship, was released on April 12, 2005, and this time around it placed on the Gospel Albums chart at No. 44. He released, My Blessing Is on the Way, on April 17, 2007, by Emtro Gospel Records, and this charted at No. 20 on the aforementioned chart. The album, You Can Make It, was released by Emtro Gospel Records on October 20, 2009, and this placed on the Gospel Albums at No. 11, while getting a placement on the Heatseekers Albums at No. 29. His album, Waiting Right Here, was released in 2013 by Emtro Gospel Records, and it placed at No. 15 on the Gospel Albums, while it charted at No. 27 on the Heatseekers Albums. He received a Stellar Awards nomination at the 23rd edition, for Traditional Group/Duo of the Year category. He also received a GMA Dove Awards nomination at the 37th GMA Dove Awards for Traditional Gospel Recorded Song of the Year.

== Personal life ==
Pastor Darling married his wife, Patricia A. Bullock Darling, in October 1973, and they reside in Cranford with their two sons, Christopher and Shaun.

== Discography ==
List of studio albums, with selected chart positions
Title	Album details	Peak chart positions	
Title	Album details	US Gos	US Heat
I've Learned to Put My Trust in God	Released: October 17, 1990; Label: Savoy Gospel; CD, digital download	–	–
Expect a Miracle	Released: October 17, 1990; Label: Savoy Gospel; CD, digital download	–	–
Medley of Praise	Released: 1992; Label: I Am; CD, digital download	26	–
Hold On...To The Promise	Released: September 13, 1994; Label: CGI; CD, digital download	–	–
There's an Answer in Prayer	Released: January 17, 1995; Label: Savoy Gospel; CD, digital download	–	–
Blessing Coming Through for You	Released: September 15, 1998; Label: Savoy Gospel; CD, digital download	–	–
You Deserve My Worship	Released: April 12, 2005; Label: Emtro Gospel; CD, digital download	44	–
My Blessing Is on the Way	Released: April 17, 2007; Label: Emtro Gospel; CD, digital download	20	–
You Can Make It	Released: October 20, 2009; Label: Emtro Gospel; CD, digital download	11	29
Waiting Right Here	Released: 2013; Label: Emtro Gospel; CD, digital download	15	27
