= El Ritmo de la Vida =

Studio album by Julissa
- Released: August 14, 2007
- Genre: Contemporary Christian music, Pop
- Producer: Mike Rivera

Julissa chronology
Inolvidable (2006)	El Ritmo de la Vida (2007)	Adorándote (2009)

El Ritmo de la Vida is an album from Puerto Rican Christian singer Julissa. It was released on August 14, 2007. Among the songs that stand out on the album are: "Mejor Así", "El Ritmo de la Vida", and "Pegada a Ti". The release of her tenth album would be in conjunction with the publication of a book, bearing the same name.

This album was nominated for "Best Female Album" at the 2009 Arpa Awards, and GMA Dove Awards for "Best Album in Spanish".

== Track listing ==
1. "El Ritmo De La Vida" - 04:35
2. "Mi Plegaria" - 04:09
3. "Tu Amor" - 04:01
4. "Pegada A Ti" - 04:22
5. "Su Mirada De Amor" - 04:02
6. "Que Hubiera Sido De Mi" - 04:17
7. "De Beber" - 03:58
8. "Mejor Así" - 04:31
9. "Olor Fragante" - 04:07
10. "El Ritmo De La Vida" (Remix) - 04:36

== Awards ==
The album was nominated for a Dove Award for Spanish Language Album of the Year at the 39th GMA Dove Awards, and was the winner in the category "Best female album" at the 2009 Arpa Awards.
