= Adorándote =

Adorándote: Un Tiempo a Solas Con El

Studio album by Julissa
- Released: 2009
- Recorded: Miami, FL, Nashville, TN and Orlando, FL
- Genres: Contemporary Christian music, Pop
- Label: Arroyo
- Producer: Mike Rivera

Julissa chronology
El Ritmo de la Vida (2007)	Adorándote: Un Tiempo a Solas Con El (2009)	Methamorphosis (2012)

Adorándote: Un Tiempo a Solas Con El is an album from Puerto Rican Christian singer Julissa It was released on May 19, 2009.

== Track listing ==
1. "Escucharte Hablar" – 05:03
2. "Tu Mirada" – 04:38
3. "Gloria" – 04:23
4. "El Que Lavó Mis Pies" – 04:31
5. "La Niña De Tus Ojos" – 04:25
6. "Por Quien Eres Tu (Because Of Who You Are)" – 04:47
7. "Portador De Tu Gloria" – 04:20
8. "Tu Eres Mi Amado" – 04:43
9. "El Señor Es Mi Pastor" – 04:31
10. "Te Alabaré Mi Buen Jesús, Cambiaré Mi Tristeza, Eres Fiel" – 07:41

== Awards ==
The album was nominated for a Dove Award for Spanish Language Album of the Year at the 41st GMA Dove Awards.
