= Regresará Por Mí =

Studio album by Julissa
- Released: 1998
- Genre: Contemporary Christian music, Pop
- Producer: Mike Rivera

Julissa chronology
Regresará Por Mí (1998)	Nació En Mi Corazón (1999)

Professional ratings
Review scores
Source	Rating
Allmusic	4.5/5 stars

Regresará Por Mí is the debut album from Puerto Rican Christian singer Julissa It was released in 1998 through Cross Movement Records.

== Track listing ==
All songs written by Mike Rivera, except where noted.

1. "Regresara Por Mi" - 04:03
2. "Lo Que Eres Para Mi" - 04:16
3. "Te Prometo" - 05:00
4. "Con Cada Latido" - 04:34
5. "El Centro De Mi Vida" - 03:55
6. "El Misterio Del Calvario" (Canales) - 04:04
7. "Fiel" - 03:56
8. "A Ti Elevo Mi Voz" (Julissa Arce, Mike Rivera) - 05:28
9. "Inagotable Amor" - 05:14
10. "Nombre Sobre Todo Nombre" - 04:37
11. "Sal De La Tierra" (Mejias, Rivera) - 03:33
12. "Tu Misericordia" - 04:27

== Awards ==
In 1999, the album won a Tu Música Awards in Puerto Rico for Christian Album of the Year, and a Tito Lara Award for Album of the Year. It was also nominated for two Viva Awards in Guatemala for International Album of the Year and International Singer of the Year.
