= B Collision =

EP by David Crowder Band
- Released: June 27, 2006
- Genres: Christian rock, worship
- Length: 30:19
- Labels: sixteps, Sparrow

David Crowder Band chronology
A Collision (2005)	B Collision (2006)	Remedy (2007)

Professional ratings
Review scores
Source	Rating
Allmusic	3.5/5 stars
CCM Magazine	A−
Christian Broadcasting Network	3/5 spins
Christianity Today	3/5 stars
Cross Rhythms	7/10 squares
Jesus Freak Hideout	4/5 stars

B Collision or (B is for Banjo), or (B sides), or (Bill), or perhaps more accurately (...the eschatology of Bluegrass) is David Crowder Band's second studio EP. It is a collection of new songs, remixes, and live songs.

== Track listing ==
Album release
No.	Title	Writer(s)	Length
1.	"Intro (I've Had Enough)"	David Crowder	1:05
2.	"Beautiful Collision" (B-Variant)	David Crowder, Jack Parker	3:57
3.	"Wholly Yours" (B-Variant)	David Crowder	4:16
4.	"Everybody Wants to Go to Heaven" (B-Variant)	Loretta Lynn	4:55
5.	"I Can Hear the Angels Singing / (…andeverandeverand…)"	Don Reno	5:20
6.	"Be Lifted" (Live) (featuring Robbie Seay, Shane & Shane)	David Crowder	7:08
7.	"I Saw the Light" (Live) (featuring Robbie Seay, Shane & Shane)	Hank Williams	3:33
8.	"Do Not Move" (B-Variant) (iTunes exclusive)	David Crowder	4:30

== Chart Positions ==
Chart (2007–2008)	Peak position
Billboard 200	118
Billboard Hot Christian Albums	5
Top Digital Albums	118
