= Julissa (singer) =

Puerto Rican singer-songwriter (born 1976)

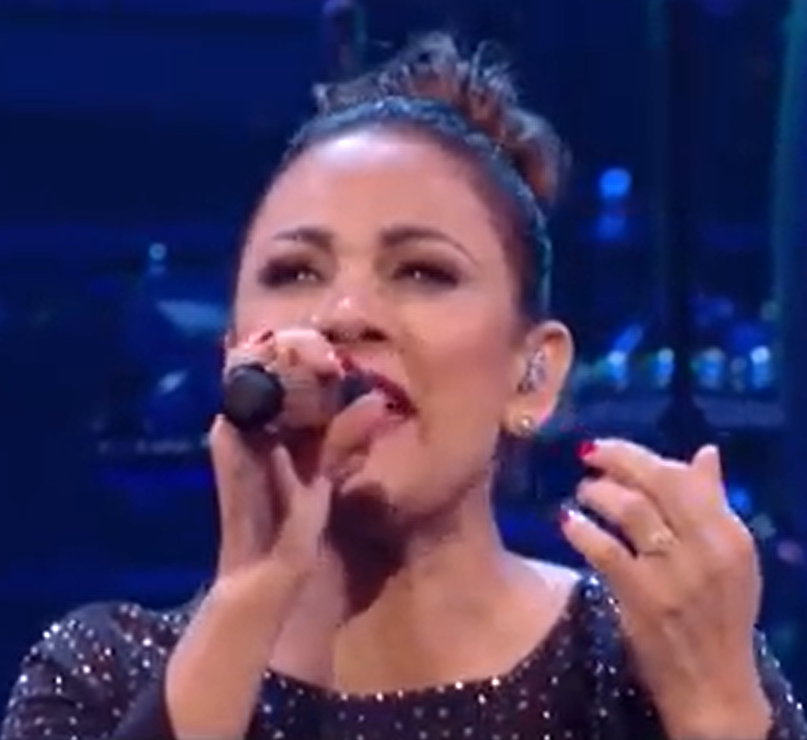
- Performing in 2018

Background information
- Born: Julissa Arce Rivera; January 13, 1976 (age 50); Chicago, Illinois, United States
- Origin: Dorado, Puerto Rico
- Genres: Contemporary Christian music, worship music
- Occupation: Singer-songwriter
- Instrument: Vocals
- Years active: 1998–present

Julissa Arce Rivera (born January 13, 1976) commonly known simply as Julissa, is a Puerto Rican-American Christian music singer.

From her first album, Regresará por mi, she distinguished by her musical excellence, which has gone hand in hand with her husband, Mike Rivera.

== Early life ==
Julissa was born in Chicago, Illinois, to Puerto Rican parents. She was the oldest of four siblings. Julissa debuted as a singer when she was twelve, with the choir of her church. At age 16, she started singing professionally with a local group called Generación Escogida. With them, she recorded several albums.

== Career ==
Under her own label, Firmeza Music, Julissa releases her first solo album titled Regresará Por Mí in 1998. The album was produced, arranged, and recorded by her husband, Mike. The album received a Tu Música Award for Best Christian Album, and a Tito Lara Award for Album of the Year. It was also nominated for two Viva Awards in Guatemala for International Album of the Year and International Singer of the Year. Julissa then toured Latin America with pastor Yiye Avila as part of his crusade.

Julissa's second album was a Christmas album titled Nació En Mi Corazón, which was recorded during her first pregnancy. After this, she and her husband relocated to Miami, Florida. During the following years, she worked on several projects like her first live album (Admisión General) released in 2002, and Duetos, an album featuring duets with known Christian singers like Roberto Orellana, René González, and others. In 2003, she released Corazón Latino.

In 2006, Julissa became the first Puerto Rican to be nominated for a Dove Award for her album Mi Propósito. That same year, she released her ninth album titled Inolvidable, which features contemporary renditions of classic hymns. She also started hosting a weekly show called Espíritu Latino on Gospel Music Channel.

In 2007, Julissa released the album El Ritmo de la Vida, which was accompanied by a book written by her. The album gave Julissa her second Dove Award nomination. Two years later, she was nominated again for the album Adorándote, and in the Arpa Awards. In the same year, Julissa was present in Phoenix for the great NBA All-Star party.

In 2012, she released her album Metamorphosis in two versions: Spanish and English. In 2015, she released her most recent album Me vistió de promesas.

In 2017, she participated in the National Hispanic Heritage Month as a representation of Puerto Rico at the inauguration of Donald Trump as President of the United States.

After almost four years of absence from the recording studios, in 2019 Julissa returns with her album Llueve, recorded live in Spring Valley (California) to celebrate her 20 years of music ministry.

== Personal life ==
During recordings, she met musician, songwriter, and producer Mike Rivera. They married on November 29, 1997 and moved to Dorado, Puerto Rico. Julissa and Mike have three children: John Michael, Alyrah and Jayden.

== Collaborations ==
In her career, she has recorded songs with Funky, Marcela Gándara, Daniel Calveti, René González, Redimi2, Alex Zurdo, among others, also appearing in various collaborative projects.

== Discography ==
- Regresara Por Mí (1998)
- Nació En Mi Corazón (1999)
- En las Alas del Amor (2000)
- Admisión General (2002)
- Corazón Latino (2003)
- Duetos (2004)
- Desde el Principio (2005)
- Mi Propósito (2005)
- Inolvidable (2006)
- El Ritmo de la Vida (2007)
- Adorándote (2009)
- Metamorphosis (2012)
- Me vistió de promesas (2015)
- Llueve (En Vivo) (2019)
- Llueve 1.13 (Dallas, Texas) (Live) (2020)

== Awards ==
=== Wins ===
- 1999 Tu Música Awards, Puerto Rico: Christian Album of the Year (Regresará Por Mí)
- 1999 Tito Lara Awards, Puerto Rico: Revelation Artist
- 2001 Viva Awards, Guatemala: International Female Voice
- 2001 Viva Awards, Guatemala: Song of the Year ("Enamorada")
- 2004 Conquistadores Awards, Los Angeles, CA: Contemporary Album of the Year (Corazón Latino)
- 2004 Paoli Awards, Orlando, FL: Female Singer of the Year
- 2004 Latin Music Fan Awards, Los Angeles, CA: Christian Album of the Year (Corazón Latino)
- 2006 Paoli Awards, Orlando, FL: Female Singer of the Year
- 2006 Arpa Awards, Mexico: Female Album of the Year (Mi Propósito)

=== Nominations ===
- 2003 Arpa Awards, Mexico
- 2004 Nuestra Música Awards, Los Angeles, CA
- 2004 Arpa Awards, Mexico: Female Album of the Year
- 2004 GMA Dove Awards, Nashville, TN: Spanish Language Album of the Year (Exitos de Hoy) (Shared nomination)
- 2005 Paoli Awards, Puerto Rico: Female Singer of the Year
- 2005 Paloma de la Paz Award, Orlando, FL
- 2005 Latin Music Fan Awards, Los Angeles, CA: Album of the Year (Duetos)
- 2006 GMA Dove Awards, Nashville, TN: Spanish Language Album of the Year (Mi Propósito)
- 2008 GMA Dove Awards, Nashville, TN: Spanish Language Album of the Year (El Ritmo de la Vida)
- 2010 GMA Dove Awards, Nashville, TN: Spanish Language Album of the Year (Adorándote)
