= You Can't Trust a Ladder =

Studio album by The Myriad
- Released: June 14, 2005
- Genre: Alternative rock, indie rock
- Length: 37:49
- Label: Floodgate

The Myriad chronology
You Can't Trust a Ladder (2005)	With Arrows, With Poise (2008)

Professional ratings
Review scores
Source	Rating
Allmusic	3.5/5 stars

You Can't Trust a Ladder is the first studio album from indie rock band The Myriad. It was released on June 14, 2005 through Floodgate Records.

== Track listing ==
1. "Stretched Over" - 3:22
2. "When Fire Falls" - 4:25
3. "10,000 X 10,000" - 4:08
4. "The Last Time" - 3:15
5. "Perfect Obligation" - 3:35
6. "Tethered" - 2:52
7. "Godray" - 3:23
8. [Untitled Track] - 0:22
9. "A New Language" - 3:06
10. "Nothing Is Safe" - 3:13
11. "We Will Be Disappointed Together" - 6:00

== Awards ==
In 2006, the album was nominated for a Dove Award for Recorded Music Packaging of the Year at the 37th GMA Dove Awards.
