= Hymned, No. 1 =

Hymned

Studio album by Bart Millard
- Released: August 16, 2005
- Studios: Oxford Sound (Nashville, Tennessee)
- Genres: Gospel; christian rock; christian country
- Length: 42:06
- Label: INO
- Producers: Brown Bannister; Bart Millard

Bart Millard chronology
Hymned (2005)	Hymned Again (2008)

Professional ratings
Review scores
Source	Rating
Allmusic	2.5/5 stars
Jesus Freak Hideout	3.5/5 stars

Hymned, No. 1 (sometimes simply called Hymned) is the first solo album from MercyMe singer Bart Millard. The album features modern takes on popular Christian hymns. The album was released on August 16, 2005.

Millard has said that the album is inspired by hymns his grandmother, Ruby Lindsey, used to sing when he was a boy. MercyMe guitarist Barry Graul plays acoustic and electric guitars on most of the songs on the album.

== Track listing ==
1. "Just a Closer Walk with Thee" - 4:57
2. "Mawmaw's Song (In the Sweet By and By)" (Graul, Millard) - 4:10
3. "Pass Me Not, O Gentle Saviour" (featuring Vince Gill) (Francis J. Crosby, William H. Doane) - 3:53
4. "Have a Little Talk with Jesus" (Cleavant Derricks) - 4:10
5. "Precious Lord, Take My Hand" (featuring Russ Taff) (Thomas A. Dorsey) - 4:19
6. "Softly and Tenderly" (Will Lamartine Thompson) - 4:04
7. "Sweetest Name I Know" (Luther B. Bridgers) - 4:03
8. "Power in the Blood" (Lewis E. Jones) - 3:42
9. "My Jesus I Love Thee"/"'Tis So Sweet" (featuring Derek Webb) (William Ralph Featherston, Gordon, Kirkpatrick, Stead) - 4:28
10. "The Old Rugged Cross" (George Bennard) - 4:23

== Personnel ==
- Bart Millard – vocals
- Shane Keister – acoustic piano (1, 7), Hammond B3 organ (3, 8), Rhodes electric piano (9)
- Tim Lauer – accordion (1, 7), pump organ (9)
- Blair Masters – clavinet (2), Hammond B3 organ (2, 5, 6), acoustic piano (4, 5), Rhodes electric piano (6)
- Barry Graul – electric guitar (1, 5–7, 9), acoustic guitar (2–4, 8, 10)
- George Cocchini – electric guitar (2, 3, 9), acoustic guitar (3, 6, 8), baritone guitar (5)
- Steve Wariner – electric guitar (8)
- Gordon Kennedy – banjo (2), guitar solo (2)
- Paul Franklin – lap steel guitar (4), dobro (8, 10), steel guitar (9)
- Chris Donohue – bass (1, 2, 5–8, 10), upright bass (4)
- Joey Canaday – bass (3, 9)
- Dan Needham – drums (1–9), percussion (9)
- Eric Darken – percussion (1–3, 6, 7), Jew's harp (3)
- Sam Levine – tin whistle (2), clarinet (4), horns (5), horn arrangements (5)
- Barry Green – horns (5)
- Mike Haynes – horns (5)
- Steve Patrick – horns (5)
- Andrea Zonn – fiddle (10), backing vocals (10)
- Michael Mellett – arrangements (8)
- Bekka Bramlett – backing vocals (1, 2, 4, 7)
- Perry Coleman – backing vocals (1, 4, 7)
- Nirva Dorsaint – backing vocals (1, 6–8)
- Anthony Evans – backing vocals (1, 6–8)
- Vince Gill – backing vocals (3)
- Russ Taff – vocals (5)
- Derek Webb – vocals (9)

Choir on "Precious Lord"

- Michael Mellett – choir arrangements
- Lisa Bevill, Nirva Dorsaint, Anthony Evans, Mandisa Hundley, Abel Orta and Seth Ready – singers

== Production ==
- Brown Bannister – producer
- Bart Millard – producer
- Steve Bishir – recording, mixing
- Aaron Sternke – assistant engineer
- Michael Mellett – vocal editing (6)
- Stephen Marcussen – mastering at Marcussen Mastering (Hollywood, California)
- Traci Sterling Bishir – production coordinator
- Shatrine Krake – art direction, design
- David Edmonson – photography
- Luke Edmonson – photography
- Mark Nicholas – photography

== Chart performance ==
The album peaked at #12 on Billboard's Christian Albums and #13 on Billboard's Heatseekers Albums.

== Awards ==
In 2006, the album won a Dove Award for Inspirational Album of the Year at the 37th GMA Dove Awards in a tie with Amy Grant's Rock of Ages... Hymns and Faith.

== Charts ==
Chart (2005)	Peak position
US Top Christian Albums (Billboard)	12
US Heatseekers Albums (Billboard)	13
US Billboard 200	126
