= Mi Propósito =

Studio album by Julissa
- Released: 2005
- Genre: Contemporary Christian music, Pop
- Producer: Mike Rivera

Julissa chronology
| Desde el Principio (2005) | Mi Propósito (2005) | Inolvidable (2006) |

Mi Propósito is an album from Puerto Rican Christian singer Julissa. It was released in 2005.

== Track listing ==
1. "Te Alabo Señor" - 04:15
2. "Cada Dia" - 03:35
3. "Coronado De Gloria" - 03:59
4. "Glorificado" - 04:00
5. "Llenas Mi ser" - 04:16
6. "Estar En Tú Presencia" - 04:56
7. "Contigo Quiero Estar" - 03:29
8. "Mi Vida Tuya Es" - 03:05
9. "El Cielo Es Mi Hogar" - 03:56
10. "Enamorada" - 04:25

== Awards ==
The album was nominated for a Dove Award for Spanish Language Album of the Year at the 37th GMA Dove Awards.
