= Nothing Is Sound =

Studio album by Switchfoot
- Released: September 13, 2005
- Studios: Signature Sound; Big Fish; House of Cards Studio; Big Brown Sound; Starstruck Studio; The Pass; Stellenbosch Univ. S. Africa
- Genres: Alternative rock; post-grunge; hard rock
- Length: 50:54
- Label: Columbia/Sony BMG
- Producers: John Fields; Switchfoot

Switchfoot chronology
The Early Years: 1997–2000 (2004)	Nothing Is Sound (2005)	Oh! Gravity. (2006)

Singles from Nothing Is Sound
- 1. "Stars" Released: July 5, 2005; 2. "We Are One Tonight" Released: January 2006

Nothing Is Sound is the fifth studio album by American alternative rock band Switchfoot. It was released on September 13, 2005 and debuted at number three on the Billboard 200. The first single from the album was "Stars," which was the number one most-added song on Modern Rock Radio and received much airplay on alternative rock stations upon release. A second single, "We Are One Tonight," was released in early 2006, though it did not enjoy much success on the Billboard charts.

The album was marred by major controversy over the inclusion of XCP copy protection distributed on all copies of the disc. This led to bassist Tim Foreman posting a detailed work-around on the band's website (which was promptly removed by Columbia Records). Nothing Is Sound was at the forefront of the Sony BMG CD copy prevention scandal, which eventually led to the recall of all CDs that contained the protection.

== Production ==
=== Recording history ===
After the large success of Switchfoot's previous record, The Beautiful Letdown, the band found itself constantly touring and were forced to work on most of the new record while on the road. As a result, many of the songs on Nothing Is Sound made their public debuts at various shows on the tours. Every night on tour, the band would write parts to new songs, and test them out during the shows."There's nothing like playing a new song in front of real people with real opinions. The people at those shows, (the extended Switchfoot family), they shaped this song as much as anyone," lead singer Jon Foreman said.

=== Music and lyrical themes ===
Nothing Is Sound is characterized as being a much "darker" album compared to Switchfoot's other releases. Jon Foreman even hinted that the album could be viewed as "a dark chapter revealing even more mysteries to be solved". Lyrically the songs explore topics ranging from loneliness, the end of the world, anti-entropy, and the commercialization of sex. The band has always viewed the album as being more hopeful than anything, pointing to songs like "The Shadow Proves the Sunshine" as how a seemingly dark theme can actually be positive. Foreman says, "I may write about how everything is meaningless, but it’s a very hopeful thing for me to be proven wrong.". The song is a fan favourite and is often played live at their shows.

Musically, the record features the most densely layered guitar work by the band to date. This is attributed to the official addition to the band of touring guitarist Drew Shirley, whose work on the song "Golden" provided a "mellow, ethereal roof over top of the song," as Foreman noted. "Noise never sounded more beautiful!"

== Reception ==
Professional ratings
Review scores
Source	Rating
AllMusic	3/5 stars
Cross Rhythms	10/10 stars
Entertainment Weekly	C−
IGN	6/10 stars
Jesus Freak Hideout	4.5/5 stars
Melodic	4/5 stars
Paste	3/5 stars
Rolling Stone	3/5 stars

In October, just over a month after its original release date, Nothing Is Sound was certified gold by the RIAA for selling 500,000 copies. The incredible pacing tapered off significantly, following the revelation of Sony's rootkit on the disks. The November 1, 2006 edition of Billboard magazine reported that Nothing Is Sound had sold 549,000 units. It debuted on the Billboard 200 at number three, being the highest that any Switchfoot album has ever placed. "Stars" is the best charting single of the album, reaching as high as 16 on the modern rock chart, and number 68 on the Billboard Hot 100.

== Copy protection controversy ==
In November 2005, it was revealed that Sony was distributing albums with Extended Copy Protection, a controversial feature that automatically installed rootkit software on any Microsoft Windows machine upon insertion of the disc. In addition to preventing the CD's contents from being copied, it was also revealed that the software reported the users' listening habits back to Sony and also exposed the computer to malicious attacks that exploited insecure features of the rootkit software. Though Sony refused to release a list of the affected CDs, the Electronic Frontier Foundation identified Nothing Is Sound as one of the discs with the invasive software.

Bassist Tim Foreman posted a way around the protection on the band's message boards. The original post was soon deleted, which caused some people to speculate that Sony would sue the band over this issue. However, no legal action has been taken. Jon Foreman would later say that he felt the album was "tainted" by this.

An additional copy protection problem was found on some of the disks that were published by EMI. These disks contained Cactus Data Shield copy protection. Some copies of that version were also recalled due to incorrect copy protection settings, although they were exchanged for other copy-protected copies with the correct settings.

== Dual Disc release ==
A DualDisc version of Nothing is Sound was released simultaneously with standard editions of the album. Notable is the fact that these DualDisc CDs did not contain the copy protection software.

The DVD-side of the album featured the entire album in 5.1 Surround sound, and also includes an approximately 30-minute-long documentary on the making of the album.

== Music videos ==
Switchfoot's first music video from this album is "Stars", which was filmed almost entirely underwater. Switchfoot has since released a live video version of "Stars", and another two videos for the album's second single "We Are One Tonight". The band also filmed a video for the song "Happy Is a Yuppie Word" in anticipation of its being released as the first single. However, it was never formally released, but was later included on the DVD Switchfootage 2 along with a video for "The Blues".

== Track listing ==
All tracks are written by Jon Foreman, except where noted.

No.	Title	Writer(s)	Length
1.	"Lonely Nation"	Jon Foreman, Tim Foreman	3:45
2.	"Stars"		4:20
3.	"Happy Is a Yuppie Word"		4:51
4.	"The Shadow Proves the Sunshine"		5:04
5.	"Easier than Love"	Jon Foreman, Tim Foreman	4:29
6.	"The Blues"		5:17
7.	"The Setting Sun"		4:24
8.	"Politicians"		3:28
9.	"Golden"		3:36
10.	"The Fatal Wound"		2:44
11.	"We Are One Tonight"	Jon Foreman, Tim Foreman	4:42
12.	"Daisy"		4:18

=== Extra songs ===
In addition to the mainstay tracks listed above, the album was released with extra material at different stores.

- Albums purchased at Target stores contained an extra track called "Goodnight Punk". The song was originally considered for the album The Beautiful Letdown but was cut from the final selection.
- Albums purchased at Walmart contained a Christmas song called "Another Christmas (Old Borego)" as a bonus track, which Jon Foreman had penned earlier for a charity album released locally in the band's hometown of San Diego.
- In Japan, the album was released with an alternative version of "Dare You to Move" which is featured during a montage in the band's DVD "Switchfootage", along with the unreleased track "Monday Comes Around."
- Albums purchased on iTunes included an acoustic version of the song "Stars".

== Personnel ==
Switchfoot

- Jon Foreman – guitar, lead vocals
- Tim Foreman – bass, backing vocals
- Chad Butler – drums, percussion
- Jerome Fontamillas – keyboard, guitar, backing vocals
- Drew Shirley – guitar

Additional musicians

- Ken Chastain – additional percussion
- Chris Westlake – strings (track 12)
- Tommy Barbarella – strings (tracks 6 and 12)
- Andy Sturmer – guest background vocals (track 2)
- Rachel Masen – guest background vocals (track 11)
- Todd Cooper – choral vocals (track 6)
- Jimmy Coup – choral vocals (track 6)
- Joel Hossler – choral vocals (track 6)
- The Kuyasa Kids – segue vocals

Recorded at Signature Sound, Big Fish, House of Cards Studio, Big Brown Sound, Starstruck Studio, The Pass, Stellenbosch Univ. S. Africa, and dingy backstage dressing rooms.

Mixed at MixThis! (tracks 4, 6, 9, 10 and 12) and Resonate Music, Burbank, CA (tracks 1–3, 5, 7, 8 and 11). Mastered at Sterling Sound, New York City.

Additional personnel

- John Fields – production, recording
- Switchfoot – production, recording
- Steven Miller – recording
- Chris Testa – recording
- Dorian Crozier – recording
- Bob Clearmountain – mixing (tracks 4, 6, 9, 10 and 12)
- Chris Lord-Alge – mixing (tracks 1–3, 5, 7, 8 and 11)
- Ted Jensen – mastering
- Michael Harris – recording assistant
- Ben Moore – recording assistant
- Matt Beckley – recording assistant
- Cameron Barton – recording assistant
- Zeph Sowers – recording assistant
- Brandon Duncan – assistant mix engineer (tracks 4, 6, 9, 10 and 12)
- Keith Armstrong – assistant mix engineer (tracks 1–3, 5, 7, 8 and 11)
- Dimtar Krnjaic – assistant mix engineer (tracks 1–3, 5, 7, 8 and 11)
- Nessim Higson – original cover art
- Justin Clark – art direction and design
- Danny Clinch – photography (back and silhouette band photos)
- Jon Foreman – photography (other photography)
- Andy Barron – photography (other photography)
- David Molnar – photography (other photography)

== Charts ==
Chart (2005)	Peak position
Australian Albums Chart	25
Japanese Albums Chart	73
New Zealand Albums Chart	31
US Billboard 200	3
US Top Internet albums	1
US Top Christian albums	1

== Certifications ==
Region	Certification	Certified units/sales
United States (RIAA)	Gold	500,000^{^}
^{^} Shipments figures based on certification alone.

== Awards ==
In 2006, the album was nominated for a Dove Award for Rock/Contemporary Album of the Year at the 37th GMA Dove Awards. The song "Stars" was also nominated for two Dove Awards.
