= Oh for Joy =

Studio album by David Crowder Band
- Released: October 4, 2011
- Genres: Christian rock, Christmas music, worship
- Length: 35:37
- Label: sixsteps
- Producer: David Crowder Band

David Crowder Band chronology
Summer Happiness (2010)	Oh for Joy (2011)	Give Us Rest (2012)

Oh for Joy is the first holiday studio album and tenth album overall from Christian rock group David Crowder Band, and was produced by the band as well. The album was released on October 4, 2011 by sixstepsrecords, and has attracted generally positive critical attention.

== Background and release ==
The album was released on October 4, 2011 by sixstepsrecords, and it was produced by the band themselves. This was the first Christmas studio album from the group.

== Musical style ==
AllMusic's James Christopher Monger felt that Oh for Joy echoed the sextet's "winning blend of ambient gospel and ethereal electro-pop."

== Critical reception ==
Professional ratings
Review scores
Source	Rating
AllMusic	3.5/5 stars
Alpha Omega News	A
CCM Magazine	3/5 stars
The Christian Manifesto	3/5 stars
Christian Music Zine	4/5 stars
Cross Rhythms	6/10 squares
Jesus Freak Hideout	4.5/5 stars 4/5 stars
Louder Than the Music	4.5/5 stars
New Release Tuesday	5/5 stars
The Phantom Tollbooth	3.5/5 stars

Oh for Joy received mostly positive reviews from music critics. At Jesus Freak Hideout, Ryan Barbee gave the album four-and-a-half stars, and stated that the band did justice to the material of these songs. Jono Davies of Louder Than the Music rated it the same as Barbee, and noted how the band crafted these into "fresh intriguing tracks." At Christian Music Zine, Tyler Hess rated it four stars, and he evoked that the album had "high quality of musicianship". Scott Fryberger of Jesus Freak Hideout rated it the same as Hess, and commented that the album was a "success".

At New Release Tuesday, Sarah Fine rated it a perfect five stars, and proclaimed the album to be a "must-own". Tom Frigoli of Alpha Omega News graded the album an A, and wrote that "Fans of the band won't be disappointed!" At Allmusic, James Christopher Monger rated the album three-and-a-half stars, and he felt that the band made "each moment count." Jamie Lee Rake of The Phantom Tollbooth rated it as Monger, and wrote that the band could "have made it a bit more fun."

However, Cross Rhythms' Ben Lloyd rated it six out of ten squares, writing that the album "give[s] the impression of a band winding down slowly." At CCM Magazine, Grace S. Aspinwall rated the album three stars, writing that the album was "not a stroke of genius, but it is solid, festive and classic." The Christian Manifesto's Matt Jerles rated it like Aspinwall, and felt that "While Oh For Joy started off a little slow for me, once it got good, it got really good."

The album reached a peak of #6 on Billboard's Christian Albums chart and #82 on the Billboard 200.

== Track listing ==
No.	Title	Writer(s)	Length
1.	"Joy to the World"	George Frideric Handel, Isaac Watts	3:00
2.	"The First Noel"	—	5:26
3.	"Go, Tell It on the Mountain"	John Wesley Work, Jr.	4:40
4.	"Angels We Have Heard on High"	—	2:07
5.	"O come, O come, Emmanuel"	—	4:50
6.	"O Holy Night"	Adolphe Adam, Placide Cappeau, John Sullivan Dwight, Leonard Cohen	5:03
7.	"Silent Night"	Franz Xaver Gruber, Joseph Mohr	6:18
8.	"Carol of the Bells/Christmas Eve (Sarajevo 12/24)"	Robert Kinkel, Paul O'Neill, Jon Oliva	4:13
Total length:			35:37

== Personnel ==
David Crowder* Band

- David Crowder – vocals, programming, acoustic guitars
- Jack Parker – Rhodes electric piano, programming, electric guitars, banjo, backing vocals
- Mark Waldrop – programming, electric guitars, glockenspiel, backing vocals
- Mike Dodson – acoustic piano, programming, bass guitar, backing vocals
- Mike Hogan – programming, electric mandolin, violin, vinyls
- B-Wack – drums, programming

With:

- Haley Barnes – additional vocals (4)

Production

- Louie Giglio – executive producer
- Shelley Giglio – executive producer, art direction, management
- Brad O'Donnell – executive producer
- David Crowder* Band – producers
- Shane D. Wilson – mixing at Pentavarit (Nashville, TN)
- Greg Calbi – mastering at Sterling Sound (New York, NY)
- Jess Chambers – A&R administration
- Jan Cook – art direction
- Leighton Ching – art direction, design
- Reid Rolls – photography
- Mike McCloskey – management

== Charts ==
Chart (2013)	Peak position
US Billboard 200	82
US Top Christian Albums (Billboard)	6
