= With Arrows, with Poise =

With Arrows, With Poise

Studio album by The Myriad
- Released: May 13, 2008
- Genre: Indie rock, alternative rock
- Length: 51:56
- Label: Koch

The Myriad chronology
You Can't Trust a Ladder (2005)	With Arrows, With Poise (2008)

With Arrows, With Poise is the second and final studio album from indie rock band The Myriad. It was released on May 13, 2008 through Koch Records. The album was mastered at Abbey Road Studios in London.

== Track listing ==
1. "You Waste Time Like a Grandfather Clock"
2. "Get on the Plane"
3. "Forget What You Came For"
4. "A Clean Shot"
5. "The Accident"
6. "The Holiest of Thieves"
7. "A Thousand Winters Melting"
8. "Polar Bears and Shark Fins"
9. "Throwing Punches"
10. "'Don't Let Them See You!'"
11. "Braver Than the Rest"
12. "Stuck in a Glass Elevator"
