= Charles and Taylor =

American Christian music duo

- Genre: Christian
- Years active: 2005 - Present
- Label: Integrity Gospel
- Website: charlesandtaylor.com

Charles and Taylor are an American Christian music duo. The brother and sister duo Charles & Taylor's are from Atlanta Georgia have released one album which was nominated for a Dove Award in 2006 in the "Urban Gospel Album" category, and they were nominated for the Atlanta Choice Awards in 2005 and 2006.

Their performances include the National Anthem spots at Atlanta Braves baseball and Atlanta Hawks basketball games, plus opening for artists such as Yolanda Adams, Vickie Winans, The Temptations and Mary Mary.

They are spokespeople for World Vision International.

== Discography ==
- Charles and Taylor
  1. I'm Not Ashamed
  2. I'm So Happy
  3. Still Gonna Pray
  4. You Are God Alone (not a god)
  5. I Worship You
  6. I've Been Blessed
  7. Just Kidding
  8. Better Than Life
  9. Heart Soul Mind
  10. Mama's Song (No One Loves Me Like You)
  11. Made to Worship You
  12. Go Tell It on the Mountain
  13. I'm Not Ashamed (Instrumental)

=== External links ===
- charlesandtaylor.com Official Website
