= Glory To His Name =

- by Elisha Hoffman
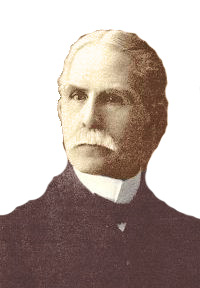
- Elisha Hoffman
- Genre: Hymn
- Written: 1878
- Based on: Matthew 26:28
- Meter: 8.7.8.7 D

"Glory to His Name" (also called "Down At The Cross") is a hymn written by Elisha A. Hoffman in 1878. It is thought that Hoffman was reading about the crucifixion of Jesus in the Bible and began to think about how God saved men from their sins by allowing Jesus to die on the cross. The poem Hoffman wrote based on these thoughts was called "Glory to His Name". John Stockton, a musician and member of Hoffman's church, set the poem to music.

== Lyrics ==
Down at the cross where my Savior died, Down where for cleansing from sin I cried;
There to my heart was the blood applied, Glory to His Name.

Refrain:
Glory to His name, glory to His name;
There to my heart was the blood applied, Glory to His name.

I am so wondrously saved from sin, Jesus so sweetly abides within;
There at the cross where He took me in, Glory to His name.

(Refrain)

Oh, precious fountain that saves from sin, I am so glad I have entered in;
There Jesus saves me and keeps me clean, Glory to His name.

(Refrain)

Come to this fountain so rich and sweet, Cast your poor soul at the Savior's feet;
Plunge in today, and be made complete; Glory to His name!

(Refrain)
