= Stars (Switchfoot song) =

Single by Switchfoot

from the album Nothing Is Sound
- Released: July 5, 2005
- Genre: Alternative rock, post-grunge, hard rock
- Length: 3:59 (Radio Edit); 4:20 (Album Version); 4:09 (Acoustic)
- Label: Sony BMG
- Songwriter: Jon Foreman
- Producer: John Fields

Switchfoot singles chronology
"This is Your Life" (2004)	"Stars" (2005)	"We Are One Tonight" (2006)

"Stars" is the first single released from American rock band Switchfoot's fifth album Nothing Is Sound. "Stars" was released to radio on June 28, 2005, and again on July 5. It was the most-added song on Modern Rock Radio in its first week of release and peaked at number sixteen on the US Modern Rock chart. The song was certified gold as a digital single on December 13, 2005. It is the band's third most successful song, behind previous hits "Meant to Live" and "Dare You to Move". On iTunes, an acoustic mix of the track is available.

== Lyrical themes ==
In an August 2011 interview with Songfacts, lead singer Jon Foreman explained the inspiration for "Stars":

I'm always looking to find order within the chaos. And sometimes when my life gets fairly chaotic, I'll take a walk outside. And in this one particular instance, I remember I'd driven off into the desert and was looking up at the stars. I had a pretty good view away from the city lights out in the high desert, and I remember thinking about the order and the perfection of galaxies of planets in orbit and traveling around space and thinking how chaotic the wars and divorces and riots on our planet must look from outer space. So that's where the song began.

In another interview, Foreman said that "Stars" is about perspective, a song about stepping back in the midst of chaos and looking at the stars; the idea of anti-entropy, implying there must be something keeping the world together. "The first verse looks at things from Descartes perspective, pinning the center of the universe on the individual. 'Maybe I've been the problem,' maybe I'm overcast, falling apart, etc... The second verse talks about our world from the perspective of the stars looking down on earth from the eternal dance of gravity and motion."

The song is a fan favorite for its introspective lyrics and reverberant, aggressive sound.

== Music videos ==
The music video for this song was filmed at Universal Studios, mostly underwater. The video features the band playing in an outdoor setting, but as the video progresses, they can be seen "floating" in a watery environment. At the apex of the song, right before the bridge of the song, this environment bursts, and the band plays in the rain until the end of the video.

The video was directed by Scott Speer and produced by Coleen Haynes.

A music video based on a shortened version of this song was used for American Idol, in partnership with Ford, in a Mustang commercial.

== Track listings ==
UK CD single

1. Stars (Album Version)
2. Stars (Acoustic Version)
3. Dare You To Move (Acoustic Version)
4. Stars (Video)

== Charts ==
Chart performance for "Stars"
Chart (2005)	Peak position
Australia (ARIA)	43
Canada Hot AC Top 30 (Radio & Records)	23
Canada Rock Top 30 (Radio & Records)	12
US Billboard Hot 100	68
US Adult Pop Airplay (Billboard)	15
US Alternative Airplay (Billboard)	16
US Mainstream Rock (Billboard)	39
US Pop Airplay (Billboard)	37

== Certifications ==
Certifications and sales for "Stars"
Region	Certification	Certified units/sales
United States (RIAA)	Gold	500,000^{^}
^{^} Shipments figures based on certification alone.

== Release history ==
Release dates and formats for "Stars"
Region	Date	Format	Label(s)	Ref.
United States	August 9, 2005	Mainstream airplay	Columbia	

== Awards ==
In 2006, the song won a Dove Award for Short Form Music Video of the Year at the 37th GMA Dove Awards. It was also nominated for Rock/Contemporary Recorded Song of the Year.
