= Switchfootage =

Switchfootage are two documentary DVDs based about the behind-the-scenes life of the alternative rock band Switchfoot. They were funded and distributed entirely by the band Switchfoot with help from E.E. Kennedy for the first one and Andy Barron for the second.

== Switchfootage ==
Switchfootage
- Directed by: Switchfoot and E.E. Kennedy
- Written by: Switchfoot
- Starring: Chad Butler, Jerome Fontamillas, Jon Foreman, Tim Foreman
- Distributed by: Switchfoot, Bandfarm
- Release date: December 22, 2003
- Running time: 30 minutes
- Language: English

Switchfootage is the 30-minute documentary written, funded, and distributed entirely by the band Switchfoot. The film is directed and edited by both the band members and their USC film school friend and film-maker, Elizabeth Kennedy (credited as E.E. Kennedy). Despite its short runtime, the film took the band nearly 8 years to create as they steadily pushed its release date further and further into the future. The film includes a short film written and directed by Jon Foreman entitled "Red Tape", film of the band members surfing, skateboarding, and concert footage.

Switchfoot was inspired to make a documentary by E.E. Kennedy (who they credit in their thanks as "the fire starter" at the end of the film) who supplied them with some of the footage for it from her independent documentary, "Everything to Lose," filmed from 2000 through 2003. "Everything to Lose" won "Special Mention" at the Damah film festival and was an official selection at the Fort Lauderdale and Annapolis Film Festivals.

The DVD also features hidden segments of film. One short is footage from the behind-the-scenes filming of their first major music video for "Meant to Live". The second shows a young Switchfoot (consisting only of Chad Butler and the Foreman brothers) then known as "Chin-Up" performing in a friend's basement at a party. Eventually this fades into a home video of a very young Jon and Tim Foreman in their Led Zeppelin cover band, "Joker's Wild", that they formed with their friend from junior high, Todd Cooper.

== Switchfootage 2 ==
Switchfootage 2
- Directed by: Switchfoot and Andy Barron
- Written by: Switchfoot
- Starring: Jon Foreman, Tim Foreman, Chad Butler, Jerome Fontamillas, Drew Shirley
- Distributed by: Switchfoot, Bandfarm
- Release date: December 2006
- Language: English

Switchfootage 2 was released for Christmas 2006, and is a continuation of the behind the scenes look at the band Switchfoot that they had started with the original Switchfootage. Most of the filming for Switchfootage 2 was done by photographer Andy Barron who has been touring with the band.

Besides behind the scenes stuff similar to the first Switchfootage, the DVD is also includes two previously unreleased music videos from Nothing Is Sound, "Happy is a Yuppie Word" and "The Blues".
