= The Myriad =

American rock band

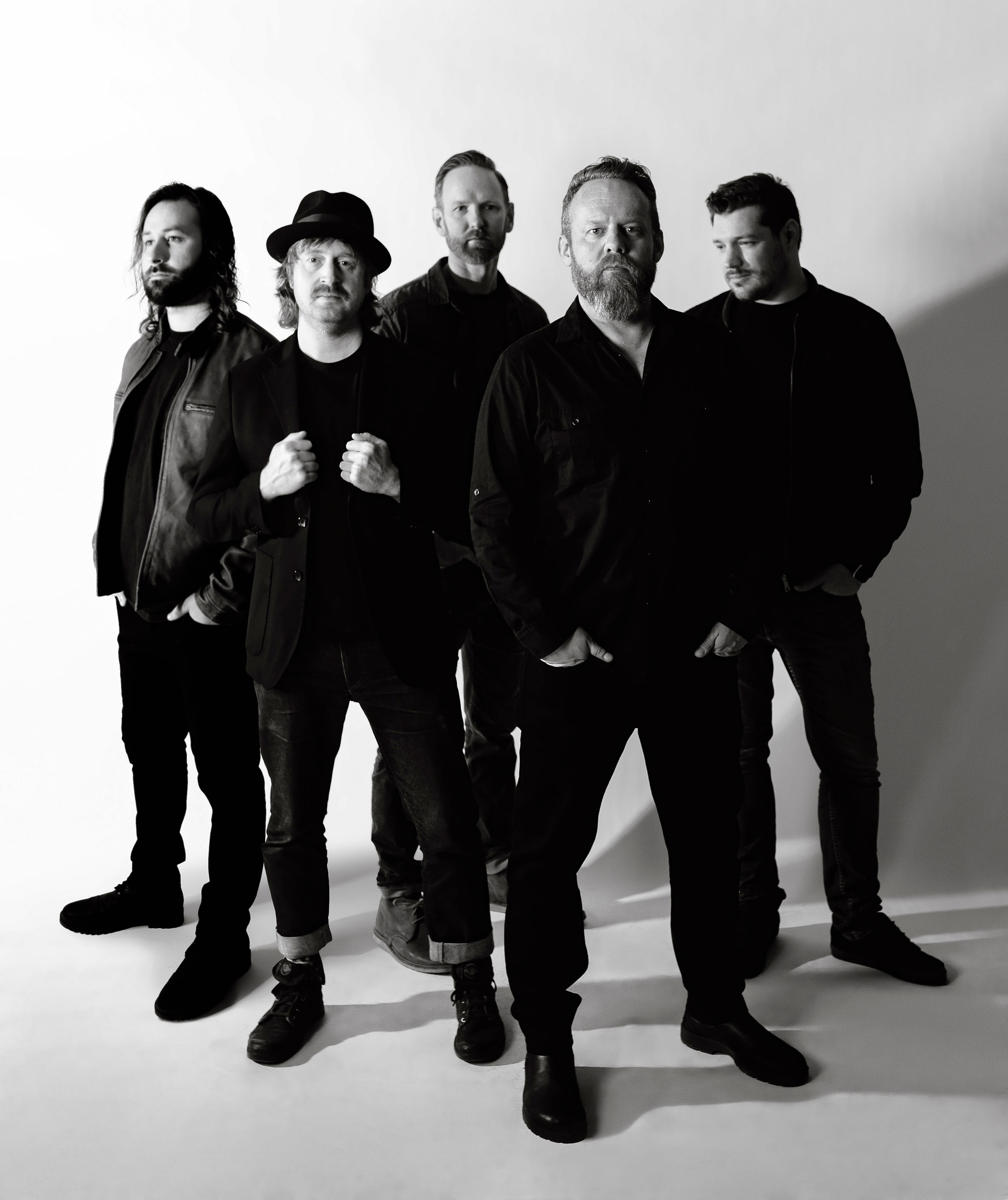
- The Myriad band photo in 2025

Background information
- Origin: Seattle, Washington, U.S.
- Genres: Indie rock; alternative rock
- Years active: 2001–2009, 2023–present
- Labels: Floodgate, Koch/E1
- Members: Jeremy Edwardson; Scott Davis; Jamie Beaudoin; Eli Schweyer; Norman Williams
- Past members: Steven Tracy; Randy Miller; John Roger Schofield; Jonathan Young

The Myriad is an indie, alternative rock group formed in Seattle in 2001. The band received critical acclaim with their second studio album With Arrows, With Poise which featured the single, "A Clean Shot." In 2007, they won MTV2's Dew Circuit Breakout challenge, deeming them the breakout band of the year. The Myriad went on hiatus in 2010 after the death of their drummer Randy Miller and eventually reunited in 2023. Vocalist Jeremy Edwardson is the only constant member of the group.

== History ==
Seattle alt-rock outfit The Myriad began in 2001 with university students Jeremy Edwardson and John Roger Schofield. The duo recruited Scott Davis (drums), Jonathan Young (guitar), and Steven Tracy (guitar, piano) to join them in the endeavor. After three EP releases, their debut album You Can't Trust a Ladder was released on June 14, 2005, and the band began touring extensively. In 2006, after the departure of drummer Scott Davis, Randy Miller joined the outfit on drums.

The Myriad's biggest boost came in December 2007, when the band won MTV2's Dew Circuit Breakout competition. Their video for "A Clean Shot" began rotation on the network in January 2008, the same year that their second album, With Arrows, with Poise, was released on Koch Records on May 13, 2008. "A Clean Shot" was the most played video on MTV during the spring of 2008. It would also go on to be released in Rock Band for PlayStation and Xbox.

After touring for four years, the band went on hiatus in late 2008 after finding out their drummer Randy Miller had been diagnosed with cancer. In August 2009, the band announced they were regrouping and heading out on the "All Creatures Tour." Regarding the brief hiatus, Jeremy Edwardson stated, "This has, without a doubt, been the most uncertain year of The Myriad. Last fall we made a decision to put down our instruments and wait with our drummer Randy as he began his fight with cancer. It would be 8 months before we all played in a room together again. That was a few weeks ago. We didn’t have an agenda. There was no 'let’s write an album to change the world!' conversations that we had shared in the past."

Drummer Randy Miller died from chondrosarcoma on November 5, 2010. Soon after Randy's passing, the band went into what would be an over decade-long hiatus.

In 2023, the band announced the release of their first three EPs to streaming platforms on July 21 after only being available physically. In August 2023, the band released a new single “Signs,” their first new music in 15 years.

In 2024, the band released their next singles “We Are", "Insomniatic", and "Time" with returning members Jeremy Edwardson and Scott Davis; and new members Jamie Beaudoin (guitar, piano), Eli Schweyer (guitar), and Norman Williams (bass).

In 2025, The Myriad released two new singles, "Ghost On A Wire" and "Something's In The Water." The band would go on to play at AudioFeed Festival in Urbana, Illinois on July 5 of the same year.

The Myriad released their fifth EP in 2026, titled Songs for a Documentary, which is a collection of five Radiohead covers for a documentary series according to the YouTube description on "Fake Plastic Trees." The EP features Wesley Schweyer on bass. Williams and Beaudoin are absent on the recordings.

Although members of the band are adherents of Christianity, they "write music for everybody," according to Edwardson.

== Band members ==
- Jeremy Edwardson – vocals, guitars (2001–2009, 2023–present)
- Scott Davis – drums (2001–2006, 2023–present)
- Jamie Beaudoin – guitar, piano (2023–present)
- Eli Schweyer – guitar (2024–present)
- Norman Williams – bass (2024–present)

=== Past members ===
- Steven Tracy – guitar, piano, keyboards (2001–2009)
- Randy Miller – drums (2006–2009) (deceased)
- John Roger Schofield – bass (2001–2009)
- Jonathan Young – guitar (2001–2009)

== Discography ==
Studio albums

- You Can't Trust a Ladder – 2005
- With Arrows, with Poise – 2008

EPs

- Until We Meet Again – 2002
- Which of You – 2003
- The Myriad – 2004
- Prelude to Arrows – 2007
- Songs for a Documentary – 2026

== Singles ==
- Their song "A Thousand Winters Melting" hit the Top 15 on the U.S. Contemporary Christian music chart in April 2008.
- "A Clean Shot" - Most played video on MTV, May 2008, and also released on Rock Band, June 2008.
- "Signs" was released on August 18, 2023, as an homage to their late drummer Randy Miller.
- "We Are" was released on August 7, 2024.
- "Insomniatic" was released on September 27, 2024.
- "Time" was released on November 22, 2024.
- "Ghost On A Wire" was released on January 1, 2025.
- "Something's In The Water" was released on February 17, 2025.
