= How He Loves =

2005 single by John Mark McMillan

Single by John Mark McMillan

from the album The Song Inside the Sounds of Breaking Down
- Released: November 28, 2005
- Genre: Contemporary worship music; Christian alternative rock
- Length: 7:58
- Songwriter: John Mark McMillan

Audio video
- "How He Loves" on YouTube

"How He Loves" is a song by independent artist John Mark McMillan for his second studio album, The Song Inside the Sounds of Breaking Down. The song was successful despite the album's independent release, and has been covered by several well-known artists within the Christian music industry (David Crowder Band, Kim Walker, Todd Agnew, New Breed, Flyleaf, The Glorious Unseen) and Anthony Evans from the popular singing TV show: The Voice. It has also been covered in Spanish by Christine D'Clario and Seth Condrey and in Portuguese by Diante do Trono.

== Background ==
McMillan wrote "How He Loves" following the death of his best friend, Stephen Coffey. Coffey was a youth minister for MorningStar Ministries. On November 1, 2002, during a church prayer meeting, Coffey prayed out loud "I'd give my life today if it would shake the youth of the nation"; the same night, he was in a multi-car accident and died of serious injuries.

Meanwhile, McMillan was recording in a studio in Jacksonville, Florida when he received a call that two of his friends had been critically injured in a car accident. Later that evening, he received another call from his father who informed McMillan that Coffey had died. The next day, McMillan wrote "How He Loves" as a tribute to Coffey and out of a need "to have some sort of conversation with God" where he could speak to his frustrations and emotions over his best friend's death.

According to McMillan, the love that he sings about in "How He Loves" is not a pretty, "Hollywood hot-pink" love. It is a kind of love that is willing to love even when things are difficult and messy. He says, "This song isn't a celebration of weakness and anger. It's a celebration of a God who would want to hang with us through those things, who would want to be a part of our lives through those things, and, despite who we are, He would want to be a part of us, our community, and our family".

== David Crowder Band version ==
"How He Loves"

Single by David Crowder Band

from the album Church Music
- Released: 2009
- Genre: Worship; Christian rock
- Label: Sixsteps
- Songwriter: John Mark McMillan

David Crowder Band singles chronology
"Never Let Go" (2007)	"How He Loves" (2009)	"Alleluia, Sing" (2009)

Music video
- "How He Loves" on YouTube

Christian rock band David Crowder Band recorded "How He Loves" for their ninth studio album, Church Music. It was released as the album's lead single in 2009. For the band's version, Crowder received permission from McMillan to change the lyrics from "sloppy wet kiss" to "unforeseen kiss". DCB's cover helped propel the already popular song to greater rotation on Christian radio, peaking at No. 8 on the Billboard Christian Songs chart in 2009.

The radio version of "How He Loves" was on the compilation album WOW Hits 2010.

=== Awards ===
In 2010, this version of the song was nominated for a Dove Award for Rock/Contemporary Recorded Song of the Year at the 41st GMA Dove Awards.

== Certifications ==
Region	Certification	Certified units/sales
United States (RIAA)	2× Platinum	2,000,000^{‡}
^{‡} Sales+streaming figures based on certification alone.
