= Remedy (David Crowder Band album) =

Studio album by David Crowder Band
- Released: September 25, 2007
- Recorded: March 19 – April 14, 2007
- Studios: The Barn behind Crowder's House (Waco, Texas); Pentavarit (Nashville, Tennessee)
- Genres: Christian rock, contemporary worship
- Length: 44:56
- Labels: sixsteps, Sparrow
- Producer: David Crowder Band

David Crowder Band chronology
B Collision (2006)	Remedy (2007)	Remedy Club Tour – Live (2008)

Singles from Remedy
- 1. "Everything Glorious" Released: 2007; 2. "Never Let Go" Released: 2007; 3. "O, For A Thousand Tongues To Sing" Released: 2008

Remedy is the fourth full-length studio album and seventh overall by David Crowder Band, released on September 25, 2007 through sixstepsrecords. A limited edition of the album including a bonus DVD of live performances was released on April 29, 2008.

== Recording process ==
David Crowder Band began recording on March 19, and chronicled the process through three avenues: David Crowder's Xanga Blog, daily YouTube videos, and an array of live webcams that could be viewed at remedyiscoming.com. The band finished recording on April 14.

== Critical reception ==
Professional ratings
Review scores
Source	Rating
Allmusic	4.5/5 stars
antiMusic	3/5 stars
CCM Magazine	4.5/5 stars
Christian Broadcasting Network	4.5/5 spins
The Christian Manifesto	4/5 stars
Christianity Today	4.5/5 stars
Cross Rhythms	9/10 squares
Jesus Freak Hideout	4.5/5 stars
New Release Tuesday	4.5/5 stars
Patrol Magazine	5.7/10
The Phantom Tollbooth	3.5/5 stars
Soul Shine Magazine	4.5/5 stars

Remedy garnered critical acclaim from music critics. At CCM Magazine, Andy Argyrakis gave it four-and-a-half stars feeling that the release is "sure to resound with power no matter what the pace." Mike Rimmer of Cross Rhythms gave it nine-out-of-ten squares noting that the album "sees Crowder simplify things and deliver his most accessible album in years." At Christianity Today, Russ Breimeier gave it four-and-a-half stars stating that "When the music is this good, worship comes naturally", which he affirmed the music on this album does. Jared Johnson of Allmusic gave it four-and-a-half stars affirming that "It was obvious prior to Remedy that Crowder approaches praise & worship projects from a different realm in the sonic universe."

At Christian Broadcasting Network, Jennifer E. Jones gave it four-and-a-half spins writing that the music is more "concise" making Remedy "a quick shot in the arm full of everything you love about DCB" because the release contains "Futuristic worship and a heart that's bleeding for a Savior to come are the crowning achievements of this album." David Taylor of Jesus Freak Hideout gave it four-and-a-half stars claiming that "the most consistent from start to finish", and it was for "Those looking for a fresh, original, and accessible new worship album should look no further than Remedy." At New Release Tuesday, Kevin Davis gave it four-and-a-half stars commenting that "in another few months this will be my favorite."

Lindsay Whitfield of Soul Shine Magazine gave it four-and-a-half stars proclaiming that "It amazes me to hear how David Crowder Band brings simplicity and uniqueness to every song they compose and work with, especially the finely crafted title track 'The Remedy'." At The Christian Manifesto, Calvin E'Jon Moore gave it four stars saying that the release is "well worth multiple listens, well worth the money, and well worth the wait." Noah Salo of The Phantom Tollbooth rated it three-and-a-half stars writing that the effort was almost an "instant classic" however compared to A Collision it was not, but "If you are a diehard then you will want this, but if you're a newbie stick with A Collision, it is a much richer experience."

However, Dan MacIntosh of antiMusic gave it just three stars stating that the listener "may not consider Crowder's spiritual Remedy doctor's orders, but when he suggests, 'Where there is pain/Let there be grace,' it is impossible to argue with logic like that [...] whether you happen to share his theology or not." At Patrol Magazine, David Sessions gave it a five-point seven out of ten cautioning that the release is "so wedded to the humdrum contemporary-worship form that one can hardly help responding with the same apathy."

== Track listing ==
Album release
No.	Title	Writer(s)	Length
1.	"The Glory of It All"	David Crowder	5:14
2.	"Can You Feel It?"	Jeremy Bush, Crowder, Patrick Dodd, Michael Dodson	4:26
3.	"Everything Glorious"	Crowder	3:47
4.	"...Neverending..."	Bush, Crowder, Mike Hogan, Jack Parker	2:51
5.	"Never Let Go"	Crowder, Dodson, Hogan	4:39
6.	"O, For a Thousand Tongues to Sing"	Traditional, Charles Wesley	5:08
7.	"Rain Down"	Crowder	5:24
8.	"We Won't Be Quiet"	Crowder, Hogan, Parker	2:34
9.	"Remedy"	Crowder	5:35
10.	"Surely We Can Change"	Crowder	5:18
Total length:			44:56

"Everything Glorious" was featured on a live album recorded at Passion Conferences' Passion06 conference in Nashville, TN in January 2006.
"Glory of It All" was featured on a digital-only EP recorded live at Passion Conferences' Passion07 conference in Atlanta, GA in January 2007.
"We Won't Be Quiet" features Ted Nugent, a fellow Waco resident, on lead guitar.
"Rain Down" was previously featured on the band's independent release, All I Can Say.

== Limited edition ==
11. "Never Let Go (Radio Remix)" - 4:41

== Personnel ==
David Crowder Band

- David Crowder – vocals, acoustic guitars
- Jack Parker – Rhodes electric piano, electric guitars, vocals
- Mike Dodson – acoustic piano, programming, electric guitars, bass guitars
- Mark Waldrop – electric guitars, vocals
- B-Wack – drums, programming
- Mike Hogan – violin, vinyls

Additional musicians

- Ted Nugent – electric guitars
- Kevin Howren – electric guitars
- Taylor Johnson – electric guitars

=== Production ===
- Louie Giglio – executive producer
- Brad O'Donnell – executive producer
- David Crowder Band – producers
- Shane D. Wilson – recording, mixing
- Mark Drury – recording assistant, additional recording
- Kip Kubin – mix assistant
- Ted Jensen – mastering at Sterling Sound (New York City, New York)
- Jess Chambers – A&R administration
- Gary Dorsey – design, photography
- Kaysie Dorsey – design, photography

== Charts ==
Remedy sold over 32,000 copies in its first week and ranked the positions below in various charts.

Chart Positions
Billboard 200	Billboard Top Christian Albums
22	1

== Awards ==
In 2008, the album won two Dove Awards: Praise & Worship Album of the Year and Recorded Music Packaging of the Year at the 39th GMA Dove Awards. It was also nominated for Rock/Contemporary Album of the Year.
