= Everything Glorious (song) =

Single by David Crowder Band

from the album Remedy
- Released: 2007
- Genre: Worship, CCM
- Length: 3:47
- Label: Sixstepsrecords
- Songwriter(s): David Crowder
- Producer(s): David Crowder Band

David Crowder Band singles chronology
"Foreverandever Etc…" (2006)	"Everything Glorious" (2007)	"Never Let Go" (2008)

Music video
- "Everything Glorious" on YouTube

"Everything Glorious" is a song by Contemporary Christian band David Crowder Band from their fourth studio album, Remedy. It was released as the album's lead single in 2007. It was first heard on the Passion album Everything Glorious The song peaked at No. 2 on the Hot Christian Songs chart, becoming their highest peaking single on the chart. It lasted 34 weeks on the overall chart. The song is played in a D-flat major key, and 94 beats per minute. It also appeared in the WOW Hits 2009 compilation album.

== Track listing ==
CD release

1. "Everything Glorious" – 3:48
2. "Everything Glorious (Medium Key Performance Track With Background Vocals)" – 3:47
3. "Everything Glorious (High Key-Premiere Performance Plus W/o Background Vocals)" – 3:48
4. "Everything Glorious (Medium Key-Premiere Performance Plus W/o Background Vocals)" – 3:48
5. "Everything Glorious (Low Key-Premiere Performance Plus W/o Background Vocals)" – 3:46

== Music video ==
A music video for the single "Everything Glorious" was released on March 12, 2009.

== Awards ==
In 2008, the song won a Dove Award for Rock/Contemporary Recorded Song of the Year at the 39th GMA Dove Awards. It was also nominated for Worship Song of the Year.

== Charts ==
=== Weekly charts ===
Chart (2007)	Peak position
US Christian AC (Billboard)	4
US Christian AC Indicator (Billboard)	3
US Christian Airplay (Billboard)	2
US Christian Songs (Billboard)	2
US Christian Soft AC/Inspirational (Billboard)	11

=== Year-end charts ===
Chart (2013)	Peak position
US Christian Songs (Billboard)	16
