= Chicago Mass Choir =

American gospel choir

The Chicago Mass Choir is an American gospel choir from Chicago, Illinois.

The ensemble was founded in 1988 by James C. Chambers, who was also the founder of the Ecclesiastes Community Choir. Their debut album was issued in 1991; that year they were named Best New Artist at the Gospel Music Excellence Awards. The following year they won the award for Song of the Year for "I Can Go to the Rock". They released several commercially successful albums over the course of the 1990s and 2000s. Percy Gray also is part of the Chicago Mass Choir.

== Discography ==
- Right Now (1991) U.S. Gospel #14
- Call Him Up (1991) U.S. Gospel #15
- He That Believeth (1992) U.S. Gospel #8
- Please Don't Leave Me (1993) U.S. Gospel #8
- I'm So Grateful (1994) U.S. Gospel #16
- Hold On, Don't Give Up (1996) U.S. Gospel #25
- You Love Me (1997) U.S. Gospel #22
- Keep Your Mind on Jesus (1998) U.S. Gospel #26
- Saved, Sealed, Delivered (1999)
- Calling On You (2001) U.S. Gospel #38
- Live in Nashville (2003) U.S. Gospel #34
- Project Praise:Live in Atlanta (2005) U.S. Gospel 327
- Just Having Church (2007) U.S. Gospel #35
- Xv Live (2011)
- My Soul Says Yes (2020)
