= David Crowder Band =

American Christian rock and worship band

David Crowder*Band
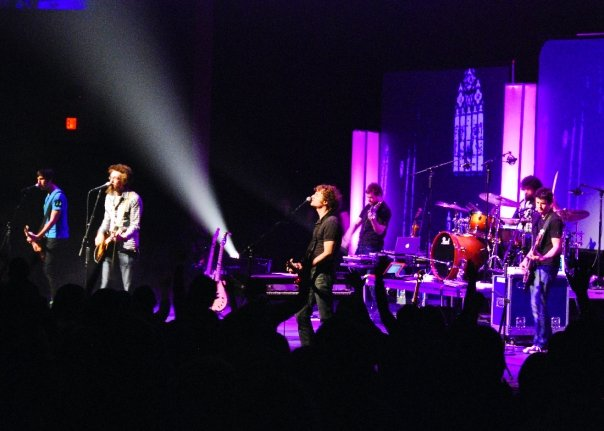

Background information
- Origin: Waco, Texas, U.S.
- Genres: Christian rock; electronic rock; worship; bluegrass; alternative rock; folk rock
- Years active: 1996–2012
- Labels: sixstepsrecords, Sparrow, EMI, Capitol CMG
- Spinoffs: The Digital Age
- Past members: David Crowder; Jack Parker; Jeremy "B-Wack" Bush; Mike Dodson; Mike Hogan; Mark Waldrop; Jason Solley; Taylor Johnson; Matt Johns

David Crowder Band (stylized as David Crowder*Band and The David Crowder*Band) was a six-piece Christian rock and modern worship band from Waco, Texas. Their final album debuted at No. 1 on the Billboard Christian and No. 2 on the Billboard 200 charts. They disbanded in 2012, with David Crowder pursuing a solo career under the name Crowder and the rest of the band, except for Mike Hogan, forming The Digital Age.

== Name ==
Prior to the album Church Music, the band preferred not to be referred to as "The David Crowder*Band". They explained that they preferred to omit the article, and stated that they "may revisit this issue if other groups named 'David Crowder*Band' begin performing," and may in fact, should that eventuality occur, insert "The Original" in front of the band's present appellation. As of the release of Church Music, however, the band has begun referring to themselves using the article, and explained "we've been at for a while now without incident, so we felt justified in its formal inclusion."

The band's name is usually rendered with an asterisk, as "David Crowder*Band". In a faux-documentary, while recording Church Music, Crowder joked that the asterisk meant, "David Crowder [is about to go insane because Jack Parker continually tries to sabotage the work of the rest of the] band."

== Band history ==
The band began when Crowder realized that almost half of the students at Baylor University, a Christian university, were not attending church. Finding this very surprising he and Chris Seay started University Baptist Church (Waco, Texas) in 1995, while he was still a student. Crowder became pastor of worship at the church and led worship and continued to do so throughout the year. The church's congregation grew, as did the band's lineup.

Crowder began writing songs to incorporate into the worship times at the church and eventually the church released an independent CD, Pour Over Me, followed by All I Can Say in 1998. These CDs brought the band to a wider audience and invitations to festivals and events followed. The band was signed to sixstepsrecords/Sparrow Records when Louie Giglio talked to Crowder about the music and how it could be used more than just at UBC and more worldwide. Although the band toured extensively, they made it a point to be back at their home church UBC in Waco Texas for most Sundays.

Kyle Lake, University Baptist Church's former pastor and also longtime friend of the band, had a strong influence on the band's music in terms of content and inspiration both during his life and after Lake's death.

With their September 2005 release, A Collision or (3+4=7), David Crowder Band explored a new realm of musical diversity. The album houses a mix of bluegrass, folk, alternative, and worship, woven together with a touch of electronic ambience. This release landed them the No. 2 spot on the iTunes Music Store and the No. 39 spot on Billboard 200 the second day after its release. The same day as the release of A Collision, their song "Turkish Delight" was released on the Music Inspired by the Chronicles of Narnia compilation CD. This song, which is a reference to the magical Turkish delight in C. S. Lewis's book The Lion, the Witch and the Wardrobe, has an old-school disco feel.

March 19, 2007, the band officially started recording Remedy; the band also revealed the album's website, which allowed fans to follow the band via live webcams, and discover more about the album. Ted Nugent made a guest appearance on the album, on the song "We Won't Be Quiet". Remedy was released on September 25, 2007. The day after its release, it reached No. 4 on the iTunes Music Store. When Mark Waldrop joined the band as the album Remedy was released, his sidekick Rupert came with him. Rupert is a gnome. During the Remedy Tour the band had up a live web feed on Crowder's Xanga account. The feed had a chat room where fans chatted live with the band and their tourmates. It showed more than half of the tour stops live which included their tour bus, live stage feeds of shows, places the band went, etc. Much of the time the video feed would be on Rupert at different stops. On the final night of the tour Phil Wickham and The Myriad came on stage for a hoe down for the song "I Saw the light". The camera for the feed was on the lid of a ball-cap and was wired into a laptop the band had in a backpack; this equipment was provided by Xanga. The band also used the feed for some time after their Remedy Tour. July 16, 2008, the band announced it would be releasing a live album and DVD titled Remedy Club Tour - Live, The DVD was filmed In NYC and GA.

Crowder's Xanga entry from January 31, 2009, mentioned the preproduction of the band's next studio album. Also on Mike Hogan's MySpace entry from March 4, 2009, he confirmed that actual recording and production had commenced and provided directions for getting to the live webcam feed, which is in a page simply titled "Church Music". The album was titled "Church Music" and was released on September 22, 2009. The first single off the album was a cover of John Mark McMillan's song "How He Loves". Crowder received permission from McMillan to change the words "So heaven meets earth like a sloppy wet kiss" to "So heaven meets earth like an unforeseen kiss".

The band hosted Crowder's Fantastical Church Music Conference September 30 through October 2, 2010 at Baylor University in Waco, Texas. Other presenters at the conference included Louie Giglio, Rob Bell, Israel Houghton, Hillsong London, Matt Redman, Jars of Clay, Matt Maher, Leeland, David Dark, Gungor, Derek Webb, and Isaac Wardell. Mark recorded a Rap song for the band titled "Bwack Be Creepin'" for the band's YouTube channel.

February 5, 2011 the band announced the official start to recording of Give Us Rest or (A Requiem Mass in C [The Happiest of All Keys]). On May 21, 2011, the band announced through their website that the band will end after the completion of the Fall 2011 "The 7 Tour" and the release of their sixth album.

Later, on July 21, 2011, the band announced that a Christmas album, Oh for Joy, would be released on October 4, 2011. The band stated that they began to record Give Us Rest and subsequently Oh for Joy came out. Some of the songs in the albums Give Us Rest and Oh for Joy were recorded in greenrooms and restrooms during the band's last tour.

The band played their final show at the Passion 2012 Conference on January 3, 2012, at the Georgia Dome.

Crowder has formed a new collective called "Crowder" that made its first performance at the Creation East Festival in June 2012. Parker, Dodson, Bush, and Waldrop have formed a new band, called "The Digital Age", and run a recording studio in Waco, Texas. David Crowder is still signed with Sparrow Records and sixstepsrecords under Capitol CMG. He is now making music under the name "Crowder."

== Unusual Instrumentation ==
The band often incorporated unconventional instruments and elements into their music, many of which were created by the band's drummer Jeremy Bush. He modified a Speak & Spell for the song "I Can Hear the Angels Singing (...Andeverandeverand...)", and used a robot drummer, named Steve 3PO, for use in "Church Music", a silver box with blue lights and switches for "Can You Feel It?", and a MOTM modular synthesizer used by Hogan. He also manufactured a seven square-foot MPC style-MIDI controller for the band Family Force 5.

A guitar-shaped controller from the Guitar Hero game was used in "... neverending ...". According to Crowder, the controller was transformed to a MIDI instrument. Jeremy "B-Wack" Bush programmed the controller such that each of the buttons were put into USB Overdrive, an application for reading signals off of USB devices. The buttons were programmed to each specific chord in the song "...neverending...". Once the buttons were programmed and sent to USB Overdrive, the results were put in to Ableton Live as a MIDI note programmed by the band. There were 12 samples in the controller.

Hogan often played turntables and played electric violin with guitar effects. A Smule "I Am T-Pain" iPhone app is used on "The Nearness". On incorporating bluegrass into the band's repertoire, Crowder stated that the banjo was something he had previously wanted to avoid "at all costs".

The band often recorded their albums in a barn behind Crowder's house.

Crowder also uses the pedal steel guitar and Dobro in his live shows

== Members ==
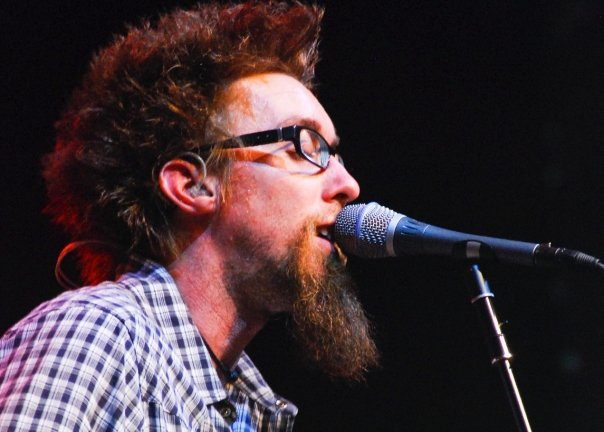
David Crowder performing in Lincoln, Nebraska

- David Crowder – lead vocals, acoustic guitar, piano, programming, theremin, keytar, electric guitar (1996–2012)
- Jack Parker – electric guitar, background vocals, Rhodes piano, mandolin, and banjo (1996–2012)
- Mike Dodson – bass guitar, keyboards, background vocals, cello (1996–2012)
- Mike Hogan – violin/strings, turntables, guitar, keyboard (1996–2012)
- Jeremy "B-Wack" Bush - drums, percussion, bells, programming (1996–2012)
- Mark Waldrop – electric guitar, mandolin, background vocals (2007–2012)
- Jason Solley – electric guitar, background vocals and mandolin (1996–2006)
- Taylor Johnson – electric guitar, mandolin, background vocals (2006–2007)

== Discography ==
- Pour Over Me (1996)
- All I Can Say (1998)
- Can You Hear Us? (2002)
- Illuminate (2003) U.S. No. 84
- A Collision (2005) U.S. No. 39
- Remedy (2007) U.S. No. 22
- Remedy Club Tour – Live (2008) U.S. No. 88
- Church Music (2009) U.S. No. 11
- Give Us Rest (2012) U.S. No. 2
- All This for a King: The Essential Collection (2013)

== Awards ==
GMA Dove Awards

Year	Award	Result
2006	Group of the Year	Nominated
2006	Rock/Contemporary Song of the Year ("Here is Our King")	Won
2006	Rock/Contemporary Album of the Year (A Collision or (3+4=7))	Won
2007	Group of the Year	Nominated
2008	Group of the Year	Nominated
2008	Rock/Contemporary Recorded Song of the Year ("Everything Glorious")	Won
2008	Rock/Contemporary Album of the Year (Remedy)	Nominated
2008	Worship Song of the Year ("Everything Glorious")	Nominated
2008	Praise & Worship Album of the Year (Remedy)	Won
2008	Recorded Music Packaging of the Year (Remedy)	Won
2008	Short Form Music Video of the Year ("Foreverandever, etc.")	Nominated
2009	Group of the Year	Nominated
2009	Recorded Music Packaging of the Year (Remedy Club Tour Edition)	Nominated
2010	Rock/Contemporary Recorded Song of the Year ("How He Loves")	Nominated
2010	Rock/Contemporary Album of the Year (Church Music)	Nominated
2010	Praise & Worship Album of the Year (Church Music)	Won
2011	Short Form Music Video of the Year ("SMS (Shine)")	Won
2012	Christmas album of the year (Oh for Joy)	Won

Grammy Awards

Year	Award	Work	Result
2005	Best Rock or Rap Gospel Album	A Collision or (3+4=7)	Nominated

David Crowder*Band is also featured in other compilation albums that were either nominated or won Dove Awards for Special Event Album of the Year:

- 2006: Special Event Album of the Year - Music Inspired by the Chronicles of Narnia
- 2007: Special Event Album of the Year - Passion: Everything Glorious
- 2009: Special Event Album of the Year - Passion: God of This City

=== Others ===
The band was named MSN's Artist of the Month for July 2006, and later won Artist of the Year for 2006.
