= Church Music (album) =

Studio album by David Crowder Band
- Released: September 22, 2009
- Genres: Christian rock; electronica; experimental; prog rock; worship
- Length: 73:44
- Label: sixsteps/Sparrow Records
- Producer: David Crowder Band

David Crowder Band chronology
| Remedy Club Tour – Live (2008) | Church Music (2009) | Summer Happiness (2010) |

Singles from Church Music
- 1. "How He Loves" Released: 2009; 2. "Oh, Happiness" Released: 2010; 3. "SMS [Shine]" Released: 2010

Church Music is the fifth full-length studio album and ninth overall by David Crowder Band, released September 22, 2009 through sixstepsrecords. It reached No. 1 on the Billboard Christian albums chart, and debuted at No. 11 on the Billboard 200.

== Recording process ==
The album runs continuously (there are no gaps between the tracks), which essentially creates a 73-minute song, and when the album is looped, it creates a neverending song. To do this the band sequenced the tracks before anything had been recorded so keys and tempos could be finalized. According to David Crowder, "We programmed the album first, forcing ourselves to write from the track up, and then, after the song emerged, we dismantled it, replacing much of the programming with live instrumentation but leaving the fundamentals that the song emerged from intact."

== Musical style ==
Church Music differs considerably from the previous album (Remedy) in the band's heavy use of synthesizers and other electronic instruments. In past albums this style is limited to only several songs, however on Church Music an electronic beat (at minimum) is present in almost every track. David Crowder alluded to this stylistic shift in the bridge of "Alleluia, Sing," about which he commented, "In many ways this is classic Crowder Band, but the real, and first, indicator that the album is going to take a left turn is the bridge, where the pulsating synth bed serves as a sign post, saying 'there are going to be musical elements present which are extremely familiar to listeners accustomed to the sounds of the current landscape of popular music.'"

In his glowing review for AllMusic, Jared Johnson described the record's sound as "somewhere between the urgent rock of the Killers and the ambient synth-emo flare of Owl City and The Rocket Summer." He considered songs such as "We Are Loved" and "What a Miracle" prog rock and even noted the disco-rock of "Church Music - Dance (!)" as crossover-worthy. Taking the band's large electronic influence into account, he claimed the album attempted "to transform an entire genre with sequencers and club beats in tow." Kevin Davis of Christian Music Review echoed these genre comparisons, claiming the group crafted "compelling, inimitably progressive electronic rock."

== Critical reception ==
Professional ratings
Review scores
| Source | Rating |
|---|---|
| AllMusic | 4.5/5 stars |
| Alpha Omega News | A |
| Christian Music Review | 10/10 stars |
| Christianity Today | 4/5 stars |
| Cross Rhythms | 10/10 squares |
| Jesus Freak Hideout | 5/5 stars 4.5/5 stars |
| Louder Than the Music | 4/5 stars |
| New Release Tuesday | 5/5 stars |
| The Phantom Tollbooth | 4.5/5 stars |

Church Music garnered critical acclaim from music critics. Jared Johnson, writing for AllMusic, gave it 4 1/2 out of 5 stars, stating that "from beginning to end Church Music astonishes, mesmerizes and reaffirms that original, out of the box, unstereotypical worship is what David does best and what the genre needs, and deserves." At Jesus Freak Hideout, Kevin Chamberlin gave it a glowing 5-out-of-5-stars review, commenting on the powerful worship experience that is created, which is "not only pleasant to the soul, but also pleasant to the ears". Also, Jesus Freak Hideout's founder John DiBiase gave it four and a half stars out of five, commenting that the album "shines with excellence." Haydon Spenceley writing for Cross Rhythms gave it a perfect ten squares, calling them "17-strong set of songs" that shows "this a beautifully rounded piece of work." At Christianity Today, Robert Ham gave it four stars out of five, noting how "The group drives this point home by melding the disc's 17 songs into a seamless whole." Kevin Davis, writing for Christian Music Review, gave it a perfect ten stars, affirming that "To add to the uniqueness of the album, the 17 songs on the album play continuously from beginning to end with one song blending into the next." At New Release Tuesday, Kevin McNeese gave it a perfect five stars, proclaiming that "They have produced an entertaining album full of vertical lyrics that never point anywhere else but up and created a subgenre that they can own all by themselves." Derek Walker of The Phantom Tollbooth gave it four and a half stars, calling this "Intense, majestic and full of life, if a tad overblown, this is the sort of music the church needs more of." At Louder Than the Music, Suzanne Physick gave it four stars out of five, alluding to how this was a "very arty album" that's "full of very atmospheric, almost anthemic sounds and a great listen." Grading the album an A, Alpha Omega News' Ken Wiegman writing that "The new techno sound gives a breath of life to the project and it is very intentional at getting the songs planted into your brain."

=== Awards ===
In 2010, the album won a Dove Award for Praise & Worship Album of the Year at the 41st GMA Dove Awards. It was also nominated for Rock/Contemporary Album of the Year, while the song "How He Loves" was nominated for Rock/Contemporary Recorded Song of the Year.

== Track listing ==
Album release
| No. | Title | Writer(s) | Length |
|---|---|---|---|
| 1. | "Phos Hilaron (Hail Gladdening Light)" | David Crowder | 2:06 |
| 2. | "Alleluia, Sing" | Crowder | 4:30 |
| 3. | "The Nearness" | Crowder, Mike Dodson | 3:55 |
| 4. | "Shadows" | Crowder | 3:26 |
| 5. | "Eastern Hymn" | Crowder | 6:26 |
| 6. | "SMS (Shine)" | Crowder, Jack Parker | 3:18 |
| 7. | "The Veil" | Crowder | 4:19 |
| 8. | "We Are Loved" | Crowder, Dodson | 4:17 |
| 9. | "All Around Me" (Flyleaf cover) | Sameer Bhattacharya, James Culpepper, Jared Hartmann, Lacey Mosley | 4:37 |
| 10. | "How He Loves" (John Mark McMillan cover) | John Mark McMillan | 5:19 |
| 11. | "Can I Lie Here" | Crowder, Mike Hogan, Mark Waldrop | 3:24 |
| 12. | "Birmingham (We Are Safe)" | Crowder | 3:38 |
| 13. | "Church Music - Dance (!)" | Jeremy Bush, Crowder, Parker | 3:52 |
| 14. | "What a Miracle" | Crowder | 3:41 |
| 15. | "Oh, Happiness" | Crowder, Parker | 3:17 |
| 16. | "God Almighty, None Compares" | Bush, Crowder, Parker, Waldrop | 6:51 |
| 17. | "In the End (O Resplendent Light!)" | Bush, Crowder | 6:53 |
| Total length: | | | 73:44 |

== Personnel ==
David Crowder* Band

- David Crowder – vocals, programming, acoustic guitars
- Jack Parker – acoustic piano, Rhodes electric piano, programming, electric guitars
- Mark Waldrop – programming, electric guitars, glockenspiel
- Mike Dodson – acoustic piano, programming, bass guitar, cello, clarinet, various horns
- B-Wack – drums, programming
- Mike Hogan – programming, violin, vinyls

Additional musicians

- William "The Foe" – additional programming
- Pete Kipley – additional programming (4, 6)
- Griffin Kelp – percussion elements on bridge (5)
- Lacey Sturm – backing vocals (3)
- Chauntelle DuPree – backing vocals (6, 7, 10)
- Christie DuPree – backing vocals (6, 7, 10)
- Sherri DuPree – backing vocals (6, 7, 10)
- Stacy DuPree – backing vocals (6, 7, 10)
- The UBC Choir – choir (15)

=== Production ===
- Louie Giglio – executive producer
- Brad O'Donnell – executive producer
- David Crowder*Band – producers, recording
- Shane D. Wilson – mixing at Pentavarit (Nashville, Tennessee)
- Ted Jensen – mastering at Sterling Sound (New York City, New York)
- Jess Chambers – A&R administration
- Leighton Ching – booklet design
- Gary Dorsey – design, photography
- Kaysie Dorsey – design, photography
