= A Collision =

A Collision or (3+4=7)

Studio album by David Crowder Band
- Released: September 27, 2005
- Recorded: 2004–2005
- Studios: The Barn behind Crowder's House (Waco, Texas); Cash Cabin Studio (Hendersonville, Tennessee); Pentavarit (Nashville, Tennessee); Capitol Studios (Hollywood, California)
- Genres: Christian rock, worship
- Length: 72:59
- Label: sixsteps
- Producers: David Crowder Band; Tedd T; Ed Cash

David Crowder Band chronology
A Collision Is Coming (2005)	A Collision or (3+4=7) (2005)	B Collision (2006)

Singles from A Collision (3 + 4 = 7)
- 1. "Here Is Our King" Released: 2005; 2. "Wholly Yours" Released: 2005; 3. "Do Not Move (appears on A Collision Is Coming)" Released: September 20, 2005; 4. "A Beautiful Collision (appears on A Collision Is Coming)" Released: September 20, 2005; 5. "Foreverandever etc... (appears on A Collision Is Coming)" Released: September 20, 2005

A Collision or (3+4=7) is the third full-length studio album and sixth album overall by David Crowder Band and the third recorded for sixstepsrecords, released in September 2005. "Foreverandever Etc..." is on the Digital Praise PC game Guitar Praise.

== Critical reception ==
Professional ratings
Review scores
Source	Rating
Allmusic	4.5/5 stars
CCM Magazine	A−
Christian Broadcasting Network	4/5 spins
Christianity Today	5/5 stars
Cross Rhythms	10/10 squares
Jesus Freak Hideout	5/5 stars
Patrol Magazine	7.8/10
Soul Shine Magazine	4/5 stars

A Collision garnered critical acclaim from music critics. At CCM Magazine, David McCreary graded the album an A−, feeling that "With A Collision, the six-piece modern worship outfit unfurls its most diverse and sonically compelling album to date—an 18-track set clocking in at a satisfying 73 minutes and change." Tony Cummings the founder of Cross Rhythms gave it a perfect ten squares calling it "truly a groundbreaking album", also stating it's a "classic which will be enjoyed and wondered at for decades to come". At Christianity Today, Russ Breimeier gave it a perfect five stars proclaiming that the release is "unquestionably ambitious and inspired, unlike any modern worship album to this point" on which is "nonetheless an expression of worship—one so catchy and creative, fans will clamor to David Crowder Band concerts to sing praises to God at the top of their lungs." Jared Johnson of Allmusic gave it four-and-a-half stars noting how "A Collision's stronghold on the CCM charts continued for well over a year, racking up every accolade imaginable."

At Christian Broadcasting Network, Jennifer E. Jones gave it four spins writing that it is "Too hard to pick album highlights" on the release because "It's an experience piece that should be listened to in its entirety with headphones on and hands lifted high." David Taylor of Jesus Freak Hideout gave it a perfect five stars highlighting that "Part of the beauty of this release is David Crowder Band's ability to seamlessly blend in more traditional modern worship songs with newer techniques, creating a solid yet original worship album from start to finish." Paul Whitfield of Soul Shine Magazine gave it four stars writing that "With their lyrically inspiring songs, outstanding music, and spiritual depth this masterpiece fits together nicely on Crowder's musical canvas." At Patrol Magazine, David Session gave it a seven point eight out of ten finding that "the artistic shock therapy that _A Collision_ performs on worship music as a whole cannot be praised highly enough." Joe Montague of The Phantom Tollbooth in an unrated review stating that "A Collision provides further proof that the often enigmatic Crowder deserves to be mentioned in the same breath as the top artists of our day."

== Track listing ==
Source: Official David Crowder site

No.	Title	Writer(s)	Length
1.	"Everybody Wants to Go to Heaven (A Walk Down Stairs)"	Loretta Lynn	1:03
2.	"Come and Listen" (Also featured on Pour Over Me.)	David Crowder	2:48
3.	"Here is Our King"	Crowder	3:45
4.	"Wholly Yours"	Crowder	4:29
5.	"Foreverandever Etc..."	Crowder, Mike Dodson, Jack Parker	3:23
6.	"(A Quiet Interlude)"		0:47
7.	"A Beautiful Collision"	Crowder, Parker	3:39
8.	"Soon I Will Be Done With the Troubles of the World"		0:47
9.	"Be Lifted or Hope Rising"	Crowder	4:40
10.	"I Saw the Light" (Hank Williams Sr. cover) (Additional verses by Crowder and Johnny Cash) (featuring Marty Stuart)	Hank Williams Sr.	3:45
11.	"O God Where are You Now (In Pickerel Lake? Pigeon? Marquette? Mackinaw?)" (Sufjan Stevens cover)	Sufjan Stevens	5:02
12.	"(B Quiet Interlude)"		2:17
13.	"Do Not Move"	Crowder	5:26
14.	"Come Awake"	Crowder, Mike Hogan, Jason Solley	5:08
15.	"You are My Joy"	Crowder	5:15
16.	"Our Happy Home" (Loosely based on the hymn "Jerusalem, My Happy Home".)	Arrangement and Music: Crowder	3:51
17.	"(Repeat/Return) or When the Seventh Angel Sounded His Trumpet, and There Were Loud Voices in Heaven, Which Said: 'The Kingdom of the World Has Become the Kingdom of Our Lord and of His Christ, and He Will Reign Foreverandever, Etc...'"		0:11
18.	"We Win!"	Crowder, Dodson, Parker	3:39
19.	"Rescue is Coming (B Walk Down Stairs)"	Crowder	6:37
20.	"A Conversation"		2:53
21.	"The Lark Ascending or (Perhaps More Accurately, I’m Trying to Make You Sing)"	Crowder, Ralph Vaughan Williams	3:24
Total length:			72:49

iTunes exclusive
No.	Title	Length
22.	"The Story of Marty Stuart and the Rather Understated Jacket" (story narrated by David Crowder only on extended iTunes edition)	6:39
Total length:		79:28

== Personnel ==
David Crowder* Band

- David Crowder – vocals, acoustic piano, programming, acoustic guitars
- Jack Parker – keyboards, electric guitars, banjo
- Jason Solley – electric guitars, vocals
- Mike Dodson – programming, bass guitar
- B-Wack – drums, programming
- Mike Hogan – violin, vinyls, vocals (21)

Additional musicians

- Gary Burnette – electric guitars
- Marty Stuart – mandolin (9, 10), vocals (9, 10)
- Mitch Watkins – guitars (12, 21)
- The Greater Zion Choir – choir
- Howard Roberts Chorale – singers (8)
- Ralph Stanley – spoken introduction (10)
- Various group singers (10)

Strings on "Come and Listen"

- David Campbell – arrangements and conductor
- Suzie Katayama and Bettie Ross-Blumer – music preparation
- Larry Corbett and Suzie Katayama – cello
- Shanti Randall – viola
- Charlie Bisharat and Mario DeLeon – violin

== Production ==
- Louie Giglio – executive producer
- Brad O'Donnell – executive producer
- David Crowder* Band – producers
- Tedd T – producer (3–5), recording (3–5), editing (3–5)
- Ed Cash – vocal producer (4, 14)
- Shane D. Wilson – recording, mixing, editing (3–5)
- Chris Henning – recording (1, 2, 6–21), digital editing (1, 2, 6–9, 11–21), mix assistant
- Rusty Varenkamp – recording (3–5), editing (3–5)
- Chuck Turner – engineer (10)
- Kevin B. Hipp – digital editing (10)
- Alice Smith – mix coordinator
- Dave Stuenebrink – mix coordinator
- Hank Williams – mastering (1–9, 11–21) at MasterMix (Nashville, Tennessee)
- Richard Dodd – mastering (10)
- Mark Petaccia – production assistant (10)
- Gary Dorsey – design, photography
- Kaysie Dorsey – design, photography

== Chart positions ==
Chart (2007–2008)	Peak position
Billboard 200	39
Billboard Hot Christian Albums	1

== Awards ==
In 2006, the album won a Dove Award for Rock/Contemporary Album of the Year at the 37th GMA Dove Awards. The song "Here Is Our King" also won Rock/Contemporary Recorded Song of the Year.
