= 39th GMA Dove Awards =

2008 US music awards ceremony

- Date: April 23, 2008
- Location: Grand Ole Opry House, Nashville, Tennessee

Television/radio coverage
- Network: Gospel Music Channel

The 39th Annual GMA Dove Awards presentation was held on April 23, 2008, recognizing accomplishments of musicians for the year 2007. The show was held at the Grand Ole Opry House in Nashville, Tennessee.

Nominations were announced on February 14, 2008, by singer Michael W. Smith and Elle Duncan at a press conference.

TobyMac won three awards, including Artist of the Year, while Brandon Heath won New Artist of the Year. Mark Hall and David Crowder Band each won three awards also. Other multiple winners include: Casting Crowns, Chris Tomlin, Ernie Haase & Signature Sound, Israel & New Breed, and Trin-I-Tee 5:7.

After years with spotty or little TV coverage, the event found a permanent home on Gospel Music Channel (now Up TV), marking the first live broadcast since 2004.

== Performers ==
The following performed at the telecast ceremony:

| Artist(s) | Song(s) |
|---|---|
| Casting Crowns | "East to West" |
| The Clark Sisters | "Blessed and Highly Favored" |
| Michael W. Smith | |
| Amy Grant | |
| Marvin Sapp | "Never Would Have Made It" |
| Switchfoot | "This Is Home" |
| Steven Curtis Chapman | |
| Chris Tomlin | |
| Trin-I-Tee 5:7 | "Listen" |
| David Crowder Band | "Everything Glorious" |
| Israel Houghton | |
| Charlie Daniels; Mac Powell | |

== Awards ==
=== General ===
==== Artist of the Year ====
- Casting Crowns
- Chris Tomlin
- Natalie Grant
- Point of Grace
- Skillet
- The Clark Sisters
- TobyMac

==== New Artist of the Year ====
- 33 Miles
- Austins Bridge
- Brandon Heath
- DeWayne Woods
- Group 1 Crew
- Mandisa
- Rush of Fools

==== Group of the Year ====
- Casting Crowns
- David Crowder Band
- Ernie Haase & Signature Sound
- Hillsong United
- Point of Grace
- Selah
- The Clark Sisters

==== Male Vocalist of the Year ====
- Chris Tomlin
- Gerald Wolfe
- Jon Foreman
- Mark Hall
- Mark Schultz
- Marvin Sapp
- TobyMac

==== Female Vocalist of the Year ====
- Amy Grant
- Christy Nockels
- Darlene Zschech
- Krystal Meyers
- Mandisa
- Natalie Grant
- Sandi Patty

==== Song of the Year ====
- "Amazing Grace (My Chains Are Gone)" – Chris Tomlin
  - Chris Tomlin, Louie Giglio, Traditional, songwriters
- "Bring the Rain" – MercyMe
  - Bart Millard, James Bryson, Nathan Cochran, Barry Graul, Michael John Scheuchzer, Robin Shaffer, songwriters
- "East to West" – Casting Crowns
  - Mark Hall, Bernie Herms, songwriters
- "Give You Glory" – Jeremy Camp
  - Jeremy Camp, songwriter
- "How You Live (Turn Up the Music)" – Point of Grace
  - Cindy Morgan, songwriter
- "I'm Not Who I Was" – Brandon Heath
  - Brandon Heath, songwriter
- "In Better Hands" – Natalie Grant
  - Catt Gravitt, Jim Daddario, Thom Hardwell, songwriters
- "Made to Love" – TobyMac
  - Toby McKeehan, Cary Barlowe, Jamie Moore, Aaron Rice, songwriters
- "Tears of the Saints" – Leeland
  - Leeland Mooring, Jack Mooring, songwriters
- "Undo" – Rush of Fools
  - William Davis, Kevin Huguley, Wes Willis, songwriters

==== Songwriter of the Year ====
- Cindy Morgan

==== Producer of the Year ====
- Bernie Herms
- Ed Cash
- Ian Eskelin
- Israel Houghton
- Nathan Nockels

=== Pop ===
==== Pop/Contemporary Recorded Song of the Year ====
- "East to West" – Casting Crowns
- "I'm Not Who I Was" – Brandon Heath
- "In Better Hands" – Natalie Grant
- "Tears of the Saints" – Leeland
- "Undo" – Rush of Fools

==== Pop/Contemporary Album of the Year ====
- Blink – Plumb
- GO Remixed – Newsboys
- How You Live – Point of Grace
- Rush of Fools – Rush of Fools
- The Altar and the Door – Casting Crowns
- Whispered and Shouted – Aaron Shust

=== Rock ===
==== Rock Recorded Song of the Year ====
- "Break Me Down" – Red
- "Comatose" – Skillet
- "I Need You" – Relient K
- "Million Voices" – BarlowGirl
- "Procrastinating" – Stellar Kart

==== Rock/Contemporary Recorded Song of the Year ====
- "After the World" – Disciple
- "Awakening" – Switchfoot
- "Everything Glorious" – David Crowder Band
- "Glorious One" – Fee
- "Signature of Divine (Yahweh)" – Needtobreathe

==== Rock Album of the Year ====
- Jungle of the Midwest Sea – Flatfoot 56
- Live from Hawaii: The Farewell Concert – Audio Adrenaline
- Scars Remain – Disciple
- Secret Weapon – MxPx
- Twilight – Future of Forestry

==== Rock/Contemporary Album of the Year ====
- How Can We Be Silent – BarlowGirl
- Oh! Gravity – Switchfoot
- Portable Sounds – TobyMac
- Remedy – David Crowder Band
- The Heat – Needtobreathe

=== Rap/Hip-Hop ===
==== Rap/Hip-Hop Recorded Song of the Year ====
- "Name Droppin'" – T-Bone
- "Open Bar" – GRITS
- "Wake Up" – KJ-52 featuring Toby Morrell
- "Who Am I?" – Da' T.R.U.T.H. featuring Tye Tribbett
- "Word of Mouth" – John Reuben

==== Rap/Hip-Hop Album of the Year ====
- Group 1 Crew – Group 1 Crew
- Redemption – GRITS
- The Yearbook – KJ-52
- Unleashed – L.A. Symphony
- Word of Mouth – John Reuben

=== Inspirational ===
==== Inspirational Recorded Song of the Year ====
- "Be Lifted High" – Michael W. Smith
- "Be Thou Near To Me" – Selah
- "By His Wounds" – Steven Curtis Chapman, Mark Hall, Brian Littrell, and Mac Powell
- "Give Me Jesus" – Jeremy Camp
- "God Speaking" – Ronnie Freeman

==== Inspirational Album of the Year ====
- Amazing Freedom – Women of Faith Worship Team
- Falling Forward – Sandi Patty
- I Love to Tell the Story, A Hymns Collection – Mark Lowry
- In Christ Alone – Keith & Kristyn Getty
- Speak to Me – Geoff Moore

=== Gospel ===
==== Southern Gospel Recorded Song of the Year ====
- "Get Away Jordan" – Ernie Haase & Signature Sound
- "I'm Just Waiting for My Ride" – The Hoppers
- "Last Night"" – Karen Peck & New River
- "Orphans of God"" – The Talley Trio
- "Over And Over"" – Jeff & Sheri Easter

==== Southern Gospel Album of the Year ====
- Get Away, Jordan – Ernie Haase & Signature Sound
- Journey of Joy – Karen Peck & New River
- Real Faith – Brian Free & Assurance
- Sounds Like Sunday – Janet Paschal
- The Ride – The Hoppers

==== Traditional Gospel Recorded Song of the Year ====
- "Happy Day" – Lillie Knauls & The Talley Trio
- "I Can't Stop Praising Him" – New Harvest
- "Ready for a Miracle" – LeAnn Rimes
- "Selah" – GMWA
- "The Light" – Ricky Dillard & New G

==== Traditional Gospel Album of the Year ====
- Closest Friend – The Rance Allen Group
- Complete – LaShun Pace
- Live in Dallas 2006 – GMWA
- New Harvest – New Harvest
- Past and Present – Lillie Knauls
- Still Standing – Bishop Paul S. Morton

==== Contemporary Gospel Recorded Song of the Year ====
- "Be The Miracle" – Room for Two
- "Blessed & Highly Favored" – The Clark Sisters
- "Come On" – Calvin Hunt
- "Say So" – Israel & New Breed
- "You Saved Me" – The Crabb Family

==== Contemporary Gospel Album of the Year ====
- A Deeper Level – Israel & New Breed
- Brand New Day – Jonathan Butler
- Bridges – Calvin Hunt
- Live – One Last Time – The Clark Sisters
- The Gospel According to Patti LaBelle – Patti LaBelle

=== Country and Bluegrass ===
==== Country Recorded Song of the Year ====
- "Anyway" – Martina McBride
- "Drug Problem" – The Bellamy Brothers
- "How You Live (Turn Up The Music)" – Point of Grace
- "James Whit" – Little Roy Lewis, Earl Scruggs, and Lizzy Long
- "'Round The Kitchen Table" – Karen Peck & New River

==== Country Album of the Year ====
- Austins Bridge – Austins Bridge
- Big Sky – The Isaacs
- Gospel Duets with Treasured Friends – Brenda Lee
- Jesus Is Coming – The Bellamy Brothers
- Life Is Great and Gettin' Better! – Jeff & Sheri Easter
- Songs of Inspiration II – Alabama

==== Bluegrass Recorded Song of the Year ====
- "He's in Control" – Austins Bridge
- "I Will Find You Again" – Little Roy Lewis, Earl Scruggs, and Lizzy Long
- "Love Will Be Enough" – Ricky Skaggs & The Whites
- "Salt of the Earth" – Ricky Skaggs & The Whites
- "The Key To Heaven" – The Lewis Family

==== Bluegrass Album of the Year ====
- God's Masterpiece – The Marksmen
- Lifetimes – Little Roy Lewis, Earl Scruggs, and Lizzy Long
- Salt of the Earth – Ricky Skaggs & The Whites
- Tell Someone – Kenny & Amanda Smith Band
- Where No One Stands Alone – Paul Williams & The Victory Trio

=== Praise & Worship ===
==== Worship Song of the Year ====
- "Amazing Grace (My Chains Are Gone)" – Chris Tomlin
- Chris Tomlin, Louie Giglio, songwriters
- "Everlasting God" – Brenton Brown
  - Brenton Brown, Ken Riley, songwriters
- "Everything Glorious" – David Crowder Band
  - David Crowder, songwriter
- "How Great Is Our God" – Chris Tomlin
  - Chris Tomlin, Jesse Reeves, Ed Cash, songwriters
- "Praise You in This Storm" – Casting Crowns
  - Mark Hall, Bernie Herms, songwriters

==== Praise & Worship Album of the Year ====
- All of the Above – Hillsong United
- Manifesto – Pocket Full of Rocks
- Our God Saves – Paul Baloche
- Remedy – David Crowder Band
- We Shine – Fee

=== Children's Music ===
==== Children's Music Album of the Year ====
- Absolute Modern Worship for Kids 3 – Kid Connection
- deliberateKids – Phil Joel
- My Father's World – The Praise Baby Collection
- Snazzy – Go Fish
- Supernatural – Hillsong Kids
- VeggieTales Christian Hit Music – VeggieTales

=== Urban ===
==== Urban Recorded Song of the Year ====
- "I Can" – New Harvest
- "I Love Me Better Than That" – Shirley Murdock
- "I'm Not Perfect" – J Moss
- "Listen" – Trin-I-Tee 5:7
- "Simply Because" – Darlene McCoy

==== Urban Album of the Year ====
- Church Girl – Onitsha
- Darlene McCoy – Darlene McCoy
- Restoration Vol. 1 – Terrence Mackey & Nu Restoration
- T57 – Trin-I-Tee 5:7
- V2 – J Moss

=== Others ===
==== Instrumental Album of the Year ====
- Amazing Grace (Original Score) – David Arnold
- Holy! Piano & Orchestra – Terry MacAlmon
- In The Garden – Eric Wyse
- Let's Get Quiet: The Smooth Jazz Experience – Ben Tankard
- The Nativity Story (Original Score) – Mychael Danna

==== Spanish Language Album of the Year ====
- Bueno – Jacobo Ramos y Sediento
- De Corazón a Corazón – Seth Condrey
- El Ritmo de la Vida – Julissa
- En Lo Secreto – Lucía Parker
- Invencible – Vertical
- Tu Amor – Danilo Montero

==== Special Event Album of the Year ====
- Amazing Grace (Gaither Music Group)
- Evan Almighty Soundtrack (Curb Records)
- Glory Revealed (Reunion Records)
- Music Inspired By the Motion Picture Amazing Grace (Sparrow Records)
- Songs 4 Worship Country (Integrity Music/Time-Life)

==== Christmas Album of the Year ====
- Christmas... From the Realms of Glory – Bebo Norman
- Christmas Songs – Jars of Clay
- It's a Wonderful Christmas – Michael W. Smith
- Noël – Josh Groban
- One Wintry Night – David Phelps

==== Choral Collection of the Year ====
- God Is in This Place – Regi Stone
- He Is Great – Geron Davis
- Heaven – Mike Speck and Cliff Duren
- Let The Redeemed Say So – Lari Goss
- Made To Worship – Travis Cottrell

==== Recorded Music Packaging of the Year ====
- Cities – Anberlin
- Remedy – David Crowder Band
- Rival Factions – Project 86
- Secrets Keep You Sick – The Fold
- The Fiancée – The Chariot

=== Musicals ===
==== Musical of the Year ====
- 3:16 The Numbers of Hope
- All Bow Down
- Amazing Grace – My Chains Are Gone
- I've Seen Jesus
- Unspeakable Joy

==== Youth/Children's Musical ====
- Bows of Holly
- Livin' Inside Out
- No Wonder!
- Praise Rocks
- The Mystery of the Manger

=== Videos ===
==== Short Form Music Video of the Year ====
- "Awakening" – Switchfoot
  - Brandon Dickerson (video director), Lauren Schwartz (video producer)
- "Boomin'" – TobyMac
  - Scott Speer (video director), Jason Peterson (video producer)
- "Falls Apart" – Thousand Foot Krutch
  - Travis Copatch (video director), Jeremy Sullivan (video producer)
- "Foreverandever, etc." – David Crowder Band
  - Sam J. Stanton (video director), Mark Steele and Kevin Anderson (video producers)
- "Name Droppin'" – T-Bone
  - Bart Conover (video director and producer)
- "Never Let Me Go" – Family Force 5
  - Ken Horstmann (video director and producer)

==== Long Form Music Video of the Year ====
- 777 – Underoath
  - Michelle Caputo and Shannon Hartman (video directors)
- Get Away, Jordan – Ernie Haase & Signature Sound
  - Doug Stuckey (video director), Bill Gaither and Ernie Haase (video producers)
- Live from Hawaii: The Farewell Concert – Audio Adrenaline
  - Mark McCallie (video director), Audio Adrenaline (video producers)
- Live from Portland – Kutless
  - Carl Diebold (video director), Michael Sacci (video producer)
- No More Night: Live in Birmingham – David Phelps
  - Russell E. Hall (video director), David Phelps and Jim Chaffee (video producers)

== Artists with multiple nominations and awards ==
The following artists received multiple nominations:

- Six: Mark Hall
- Five: Chris Tomlin, TobyMac, David Crowder Band
- Four: Casting Crowns, The Clark Sisters, Jeremy Camp, Ernie Haase & Signature Sound, Ricky Skaggs, Point of Grace

The following artists received multiple awards:

- Three: TobyMac, Mark Hall, David Crowder Band
- Two: Casting Crowns, Chris Tomlin, Ernie Haase & Signature Sound, Israel & New Breed, Trin-I-Tee 5:7
