= Kevin Ward (sound engineer) =

American songwriter (born 1968)

- Born: February 12, 1968 (age 58); Anniston, Alabama, U.S.

Kevin Arnold Ward (born February 12, 1968) is an American engineer, record producer and songwriter based in Murfreesboro, Tennessee.

== Biography ==
Ward was born in Anniston, Alabama, a small town between Atlanta and Birmingham. At the age of six he picked up his first guitar. At the age of eleven, he discovered two cassette tape recorders. From those items, he taught himself how to multitrack and overdub instruments.

== Musical career ==
Ward began his musical career in 1991 at HearHere! Studios (now Crossroads) in Asheville, North Carolina. One of his first recordings was featured on the award-winning The Kingsmen Quartet album, "Wish You Were Here." His tenure with HearHere! included recordings by Anthony Burger, Tony Rice, The Isaacs, Karen Peck and New River, George Beverly Shea, Bill Gaither, John Bowman and Ralph Stanley. Ward also worked on music for the film, The Last of The Mohicans. During his time with HearHere!, Ward recorded, produced, and/or mixed over 170 albums.

In 1996, Ward moved to Nashville, Tennessee to work with his friend and mentor, Kevin McManus at Oak Valley Studios in North Nashville. During this time he met producer, arranger, and future Vine records partner, Wayne Haun. Together they started Haun and Ward Entertainment and quickly signed Janet Paschal and The Lewis Family. In 2007 Ward received his first Dove Award for production of the song, "Flyin' High" by The Lewis Family. Although Ward is most notably an engineer, his first Dove Award nomination was for songwriting. His song, "Teach Me To Love Like That (Lord Song)," was nominated for a Dove Award as Bluegrass Song of The Year in 1998. He lost this win to one of his heroes, Ricky Skaggs.

Ward eventually started the label, Vine Records, with Wayne Haun and shortly thereafter, they signed Calvin Hunt, Lillie Knauls, HisSong, and the Nelons. Less than a year into his co-venture with Haun, Ward and Haun signed up-and-coming Bluegrass artist, Lizzy Long. Long collaborated on an album through Vine Records with longtime friends, Roy Lewis and the legendary Earl Scruggs. In 2006 Ward and good friend, Nathan Adam (of multi-platinum Pro Tools), wrote the book Pro Tools 9: The Mixer's Toolkit, both mixers were featured on Amazon and Sweetwater Magazine.

In 2012 Ward was also nominated for the Dove Awards Urban Album of The Year after producing Change The Atmosphere by The Christ Tabernacle Choir of Queens, New York. He's produced such songs as "Give Yourself Away" by the legendary group, Newsong, along with "Soul Food," "My Good, Your Glory", and the very popular, "Wandering Heart," all featured on the Record From LordSong. Ward also produced The Message (which earned 5 number 1 songs), and Time Machine (2 number 1 songs). Both were career-starting albums from The Browders. He also engineered and mixed The Cathedrals Family Reunion record. Ward has also produced several records for Hope's Call.

After just two years in business, Vine Records was nominated for over a dozen Dove Awards, many of which they have won.

== Associated acts ==
Ward has also mixed and/or produced with noteworthy artists including Vince Gill, Willie Nelson, Judy Collins, Dolly Parton, Boots Randolph, J. Mark McVey, The Jordanaires, Sandra Payne, Jessica King, Connie Smith, Russ Taff, Mark Lowry, Russ Lee, Bonnie Bramlett, Ben Tankard, Jerry Springer, Vassar Clements and Bryan Sutton. Most recent collaboration includes Ernie Hasse and Signature Sound, George Younce, Jason Crabb, Doug Anderson, Wayne Haun, Devin McGlamery, The Perrys, Little Roy Lewis, Ryan Seaton, Ty Herndon, Sam Bush, The Prague Philharmonic Orchestra, Rhonda Vincent and Richie McDonald of Lonestar.

== Instruments ==
Bass guitar, acoustic and electric guitar, piano, keyboards and harmonica.

== Awards and nominations ==
Nominations and awards for which Ward is credited for his role in their production.

Year	Nominated work	Award	Result
1998	Teach Me to Love Like That	Dove Awards Bluegrass Song of the Year	Nominated
2006		Southern Gospel Music Guild (SGMG), Creative Support Award	Won
2007	Flyin' High by The Lewis Family	Dove Awards Bluegrass Album of the Year	Won
2007	Mountain Top	Dove Awards Bluegrass Recorded Song of the Year	Won
2008	Lifetimes by Little Roy Lewis, Earl Scruggs, and Lizzy Long	Dove Awards Bluegrass Album of the Year	Nominated
2008		SGN Music Awards, Engineer of the Year	Won
2012	Change the Atmosphere by The Christ Tabernacle Choir of Queens, New York	Dove Awards Urban Album of the Year	Won
2014		Absolutely Gospel Music, Engineer of the Year	Won
