= Sectionals (Glee) =

- Glee episode
- Episode no.: Season 1 Episode 13
- Directed by: Brad Falchuk
- Written by: Brad Falchuk
- Production code: 1ARC12
- Original air date: December 9, 2009

Guest appearances
- Eve as Grace Hitchens; Patrick Gallagher as Ken Tanaka; Iqbal Theba as Principal Figgins; Anna Camp as Candace Dystra; Patricia Forte as Donna Landries; Michael Hitchcock as Dalton Rumba; Naya Rivera as Santana Lopez; Heather Morris as Brittany Pierce; Bill A. Jones as Rod Remington; Harry Shum, Jr. as Mike Chang; Dijon Talton as Matt Rutherford; Josh Sussman as Jacob Ben Israel

Episode chronology
← Previous "Mattress"	Next → "Hell-O"
- Glee season 1

"Sectionals" is the thirteenth episode of the American television series Glee. It premiered on the Fox network on December 9, 2009. The episode was written and directed by series co-creator Brad Falchuk, and serves as the mid-season finale for the show's first season. "Sectionals" sees the glee club win the sectionals round of competition, advancing on to regionals. Glee club member Finn (Cory Monteith) discovers he is not the father of his girlfriend Quinn's (Dianna Agron) baby. Football coach Ken Tanaka (Patrick Gallagher) plans his wedding with Emma (Jayma Mays) on the same day as the sectionals competition. Will Schuester (Matthew Morrison) is unable to take the students to sectionals and Emma offers to take them. The episode sees the return of Eve and Michael Hitchcock as rival glee club directors Grace Hitchens and Dalton Rumba.

The episode features covers of six songs, studio recordings of four of which were released as singles, available for digital download, and are also included on the album Glee: The Music, Volume 2. "Sectionals" was watched by 8.127 million U.S. viewers, and received mostly positive reviews from critics. The episode's musical performances attracted praise, as did the development of Will and Emma's relationship, though Dan Snierson of Entertainment Weekly suggested it may have been preferable to leave their romance unresolved. James Poniewozik of Time felt that by concluding the pregnancy storyline in "Sectionals", Glee was able to "clear the decks for a second half of the season as the confident show it now is".

== Plot ==
As a result of a technicality in the show choir competition rules, glee club director Will Schuester (Matthew Morrison) is not allowed to accompany New Directions to sectionals. Guidance counsellor Emma Pillsbury (Jayma Mays) postpones her own wedding by a few hours so that she can take the club in his place, although her fiancé, football coach Ken Tanaka (Patrick Gallagher), feels she is choosing Will over him.

Most of the glee club has learned that Puck (Mark Salling), not Finn (Cory Monteith), is the father of Quinn's baby, and begin to mistrust Quinn. They hide this fact from Rachel (Lea Michele), believing that she will tell Finn. Emma takes over as faculty advisor of the club as they start working on their set list for sectionals. With two group songs selected, Rachel says that she'll sing the solo ballad. Mercedes (Amber Riley) jealously objects to this, and much to Rachel almost feeling dismayed, she agrees to give it to Mercedes. Mercedes sings "And I Am Telling You I'm Not Going" to wild applause. Rachel agrees that Mercedes deserves to sing the solo and the two hug. Meanwhile, Rachel has deduced that Puck impregnated Quinn and tells Finn, who then beats up Puck and confronts Quinn, who tearfully admits the truth. Angered by their betrayal, Finn quits the club on the eve of sectionals, and has to be replaced by school reporter Jacob Ben Israel (Josh Sussman), who is only going to stalk Rachel. New Directions arrive at the event to discover their competitors have received an advance copy of their set list and are performing all three of their chosen songs thanks to Sue's plan to sabotage the glee club. Emma calls Will, who convinces Finn to help his New Directions teammates. Will finds Finn in the locker room and talks to him about how special he is and that the club needs him.

Emma confronts rival choir directors Grace Hitchens (Eve) and Dalton Rumba (Michael Hitchcock), while New Directions chooses new performance pieces for their set list at the last minute. Rachel asks Mercedes to perform another ballad, but Mercedes insists, with the rest of the club agreeing, that Rachel is the best choice to perform "on the fly". They also decide to include "Somebody to Love" as their closer but are stuck for a third piece until Finn arrives with new sheet music for the group, ready to perform with them. Rachel gives a solo performance of "Don't Rain on My Parade", receiving a standing ovation after finishing. The group then performs "You Can't Always Get What You Want" by the Rolling Stones, to the applause and cheers of the audience. After their performance, Grace attempts to confess her duplicity to the judges, but they have already unanimously decided that New Directions has won the competition. Will angrily confronts Sue and promises he will damage her for all the trouble she has caused.

Having previously discovered that his wife Terri (Jessalyn Gilsig) was faking her pregnancy, Will tells her he no longer feels the same way he did when they first fell in love. He later attends Ken and Emma's delayed wedding, only to find that Ken has ended the relationship as a result of Emma's feelings for Will. She announces her intention to leave McKinley High School, explaining that it will be too painful for her to carry on working with Will and Ken. Back at school, Principal Figgins (Iqbal Theba) suspends cheerleading coach Sue Sylvester (Jane Lynch) for leaking the glee club's set list, and has Will reinstated as the director of New Directions. The glee club members show Will their trophy and perform "My Life Would Suck Without You" for him. The dance moves in the finale are a combination of the dances from other songs that have been performed so far. As Emma prepares to leave the school, Will chases after her and stops her with a kiss. Both are happy, but uncertain of what will happen next.

== Production ==
Glee was originally commissioned by Fox for a thirteen episode run, culminating with "Sectionals". On September 21, 2009, the network announced an extension of the first season, ordering a further nine episodes. "Sectionals" therefore serves as the mid-season finale, with the remainder of the season airing from April 13, 2010. Events in "Sectionals" are influenced by the season's eleventh episode "Hairography", in which cheerleading coach Sue Sylvester gave New Directions' competition set-list to their rival glee clubs. She had it that the clubs perform New Directions' songs first, making it appear that they are copying them, so New Directions, as Morrison explained, "have to do this impromptu thing and fly by the seat of [their] pants." Morrison has called "Sectionals" "the best episode" of the series.

"Sectionals" was written and directed by series creator Brad Falchuk. Recurring characters who appear in the episode are glee club members Brittany Pierce (Heather Morris), Santana Lopez (Naya Rivera), Mike Chang (Harry Shum Jr.) and Matt Rutherford (Dijon Talton), football coach Ken Tanaka (Patrick Gallagher), school reporter Jacob Ben Israel (Josh Sussman), Principal Figgins (Iqbal Theba) and local news anchor Rod Remington (Bill A. Jones). Anna Camp and Patricia Forte guest star as sectionals judges Candace Dykstra and Donna Landries, Peter Choi is the Emcee, and Thomasina Gross plays Perfect Engleberger, a member of the Jane Addams Academy glee club. "Sectionals" also sees the return of Eve and Michael Hitchcock as rival glee club directors Grace Hitchens and Dalton Rumba. Eve was offered the role of Grace after Whitney Houston declined to appear.

The episode features cover versions of "Don't Rain on My Parade" by Barbra Streisand, "You Can't Always Get What You Want" by The Rolling Stones, "My Life Would Suck Without You" by Kelly Clarkson, "And I Am Telling You I'm Not Going" from Dreamgirls, "Don't Stop Believin'" by Journey and "Proud Mary" by Creedence Clearwater Revival. Studio recordings of "And I Am Telling You I'm Not Going", "Don't Rain on My Parade", "You Can't Always Get What You Want" and "My Life Would Suck Without You" were released as singles in December 2009, available for download. They are also included on the album Glee: The Music, Volume 2. "And I Am Telling You I'm Not Going" charted at number 85 in Canada and 94 in the US, while "Don't Rain on My Parade" charted at number 59 in Canada and 53 in the US. "You Can't Always Get What You Want" charted at number 51 in Canada and 71 in the US, and "My Life Would Suck Without You" charted at number 66 in Australia, 40 in Canada and 51 in the US. The performance of "My Life Would Suck Without You" showcased choreography from numerous performances from earlier episodes.

== Reception ==
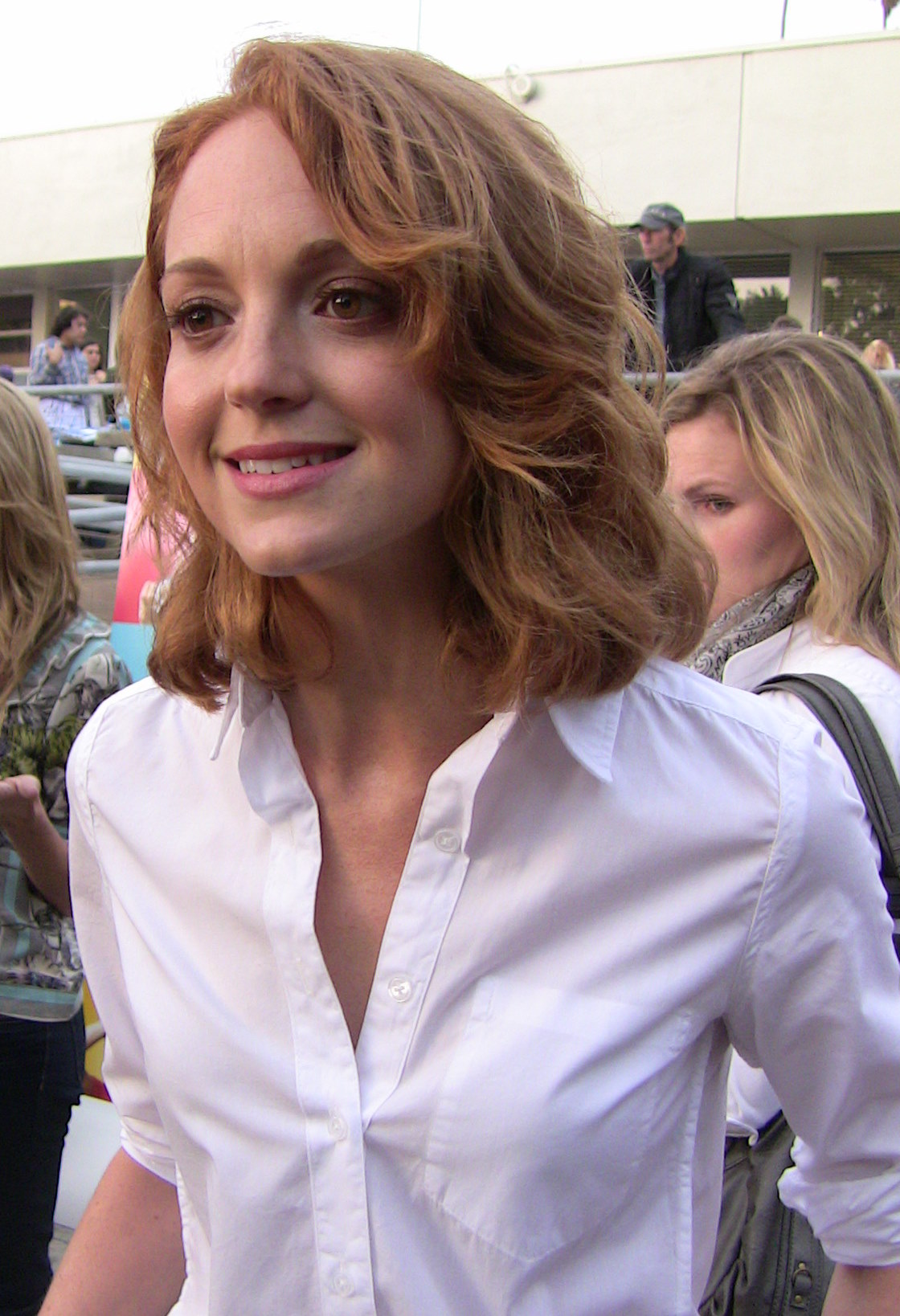
The kiss between Emma (Mays, pictured) and Will in "Sectionals" was generally well-received, though Entertainment Weekly's Dan Snierson felt it may have come too soon.

The episode was watched by 8.127 million US viewers. It was the show's highest-rated episode ever with teenagers, and its season high in the 18-49 demographic, with a rating/share of 3.7/9. In Canada, it was the tenth most watched show for the week of broadcast, attaining 1.64 million viewers.

"Sectionals" received mostly positive reviews from critics. TV Guide's Natalie Abrams felt it ended the beginning of the season on a "high note", while Raymund Flandez of The Wall Street Journal commented: "You couldn’t have asked for a better cliffhanger of a fall finale". IGN's Eric Goldman rated the episode 9/10, calling it "very satisfying", and Gerrick Kennedy of the Los Angeles Times commended it as "fine television." James Poniewozik of Time wrote: "I'm not sure I expected or wanted a feel-good ending out of the first half of Glee. But what we got from "Sectionals" left me feeling very good about where the show is going this spring." In contrast, Alan Sepinwall of The Star-Ledger, felt that the episode brought too many storylines to a head at once, "not allowing all to have as much impact as they might have had the big developments been spaced out". Sepinwall commented, however, that the acting and especially singing performances were "uniformly strong."

"The number reminded me how much I like what the show's done with Rachel: she's a lead character, yet the show allows her to be annoying—but at the same time, her dedication makes her likeable. And as we see here, as much of a pill as she can be, her ability to whip out a performance she's been working on since age four is an asset."

— James Poniewozik of Time on Rachel's performance of "Don't Rain on My Parade".

Musical performances in the episode attracted praise. Aly Semigran of MTV called Riley's rendition of "And I Am Telling You I'm Not Going" "goose bump-inducing", while Goldman commended: "Riley absolutely killed it as Mercedes belted out that song". In contrast, Poniewozik wrote that it was the one song choice he didn't like, feeling that it is overused, thus diminishing its impact. Abrams deemed Rachel's solo performance at sectionals "amazing", and Flandez recommended: "Watch it again if you ever want to take back three minutes of your life that you’ve wasted on something else." Pardue called the group performance of "You Can't Always Get What You Want" "energetic [...] casual [...] and very Glee", but felt it "would have been nice" to feature different singers. Dan Snierson for Entertainment Weekly similarly noted that he would have preferred "more vocal interplay between all group members". In December 2012, TV Guide named the rendition of "Don't Rain on My Parade" one of Glee's best performances, commenting: "Glee has done Broadway many times, but rarely better than this."

Critics also commented positively on the development of Will and Emma's relationship, with Abrams noting that she had been waiting for them to kiss since the pilot episode, and Goldman deeming their coming together "very hard to not feel good about". Snierson, however, wrote that although there was satisfaction in the episode ending on the kiss, it may have been "more intriguing" to conclude with Will finding Emma's office empty, questioning whether it was too soon for the two of them to begin a relationship. The end of Quinn's pregnancy secret was also well received. Poniewozik wrote that the pregnancy storyline had felt as though "the early Glee wasn't confident that people would be interested in it without these over-the-top soap opera twists." He noted that in concluding the pregnancy deception in "Sectionals", Glee: "seemed to clear the decks for a second half of the season as the confident show it now is."
