= Will Schuester =

Fictional character from the Fox series Glee

- Glee character
- Matthew Morrison as Will Schuester
- First appearance: "Pilot" (2009)
- Last appearance: "Dreams Come True" (2015)
- Created by: Ryan Murphy; Brad Falchuk; Ian Brennan
- Portrayed by: Matthew Morrison

In-universe information
- Nickname: Mr. Schue
- Occupation: High school teacher (formerly); Glee club coach (formerly); High school principal (currently)
- Family: Mr Schuester (father); Mrs Schuester (mother)
- Spouses: Terri Schuester (divorced); Emma Pillsbury
- Children: Daniel Finn Schuester (son); Unnamed twin sons Unnamed daughter

William Michael Schuester, often referred to as Mr. Schue, is a fictional teacher character and one of the two protagonists from the Fox musical comedy-drama series Glee, alongside his student Rachel Berry. He appeared in Glee from its pilot episode, first broadcast on May 19, 2009. Will was portrayed by Matthew Morrison, and was developed by Glee creators Ryan Murphy, Brad Falchuk, and Ian Brennan. He is a Spanish teacher at the fictional William McKinley High School and the director of the show's titular glee club in Lima, Ohio, where the show is set. He ultimately becomes the school's principal. His storylines have seen him revive the school's failing glee club, leave his wife Terri (Jessalyn Gilsig), win the love of school guidance counselor Emma Pillsbury (Jayma Mays), and marry her.

Morrison was cast as Will after Murphy spent three months observing actors on Broadway. Several musical performances featuring him have been released as singles, available for digital download, and also appear on the soundtrack albums Glee: The Music, Volume 1 and Glee: The Music, Volume 2, among others. Morrison was nominated for the Golden Globe Award for Best Actor – Television Series Musical or Comedy at the 2010 Golden Globe Awards for his performance in the role. The character initially received some negative reviews from critics, deemed "a little drab" by Robert Lloyd of the Los Angeles Times. However, as the series progressed, Morrison attracted praise for his performance, with critics also commenting positively on the development of the romantic relationship between Will and Emma.

== Casting and creation ==
In casting Glee, series creator Ryan Murphy sought out actors who could identify with the rush of starring in theatrical roles. Instead of using traditional network casting calls, he spent three months on Broadway, where he found Matthew Morrison, who had previously starred on stage in Hairspray and The Light in the Piazza. From the beginning, Murphy considered the role ideal for Morrison after being impressed by his Broadway bravado. The creators of Glee were initially looking for a song-and-dance man who could pass as a small-town high school teacher. Glee co-creator Brad Falchuk later commented about his casting process, "You'd think there must be a lot of good-looking 30-year-old guys who can sing, dance, and act, but there really aren't."

Morrison was cast as Spanish teacher Will Schuester, whose primary role in the series conception was re-assembling the school glee club and "restoring it to its former glory." Morrison has assessed that the crux of Glee is "about [Will's] passion for music and influencing his kids". Several songs performed by Morrison as Will have been released as singles, available for digital download. Studio recordings of Morrison's performances of "Leaving on a Jet Plane" and "I Wanna Sex You Up" were also released as bonus-tracks on copies of Glee: The Music, Volume 1 purchased from Target stores.

== Storylines ==
=== Season 1 ===
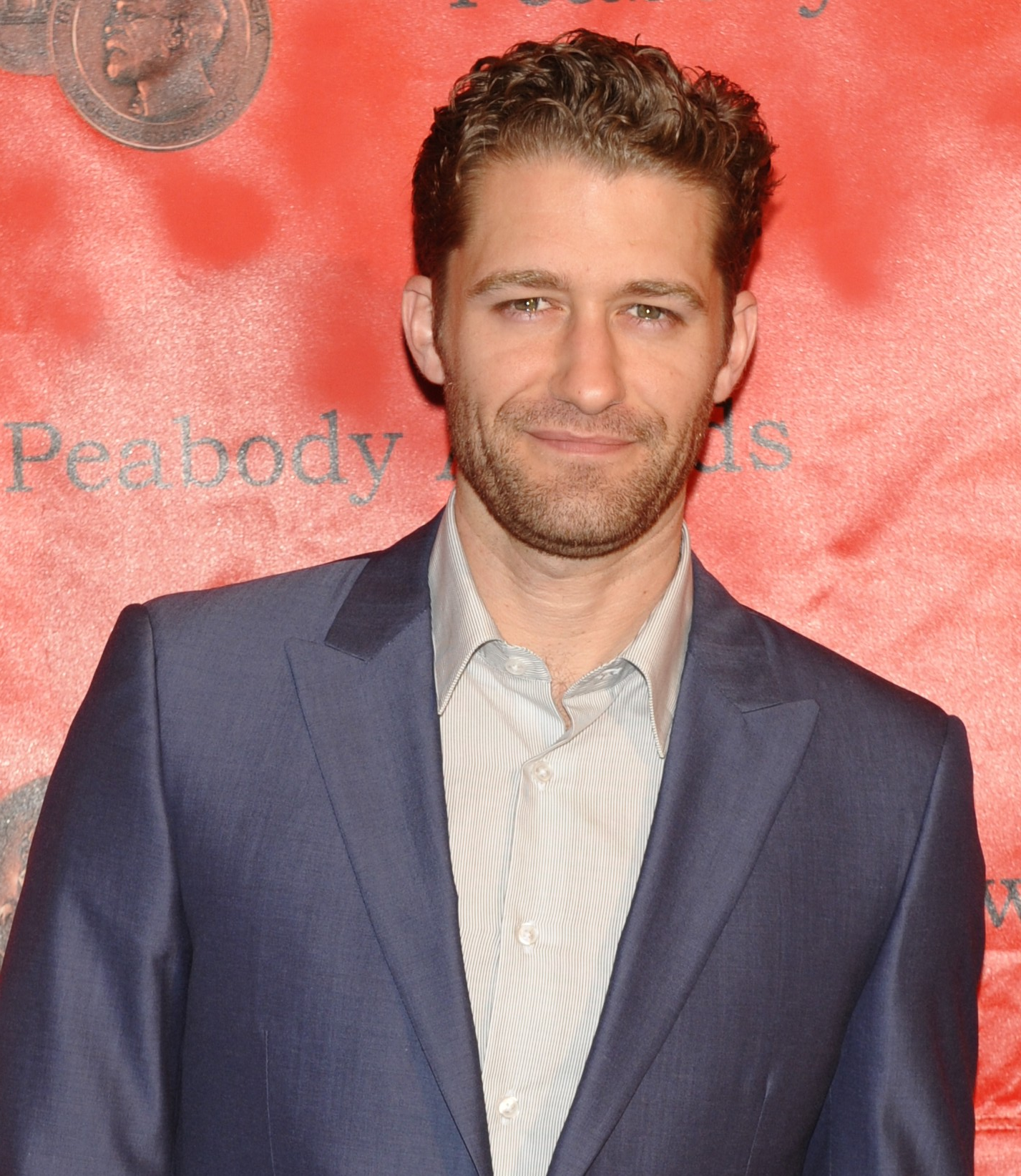
Morrison plays glee club director Will Schuester.

Upon learning that William McKinley High School's glee club director Sandy Ryerson (Stephen Tobolowsky) has been fired for inappropriate conduct, Spanish teacher Will Schuester volunteers to take over the club, hoping to restore it to its former glory. After first taking over the glee club Will becomes the father figure to all the glee club, especially to Finn Hudson, whose father died when he was a baby. He is also shown to be the father figure to Puck and Quinn caring for her throughout her pregnancy. Will's role as the father figure was first shown after Finn learns that Quinn is pregnant. He goes to Will for guidance, however he completely breaks down in Will's arms. Will is married to his high school sweetheart Terri (Jessalyn Gilsig), who does not support his dedication to the glee club. When Terri announces that she is pregnant, she pressures Will to resign as a teacher and take a better paying job as an accountant. Will is prepared to do so, but after a motivational talk from school guidance counselor Emma Pillsbury (Jayma Mays) and seeing the club perform well without his tutelage, Will decides to remain at the school and coach the team. Principal Figgins (Iqbal Theba) allows him to do so, but warns that if the club fails to place at the Regionals competition, he will close it down. Will briefly works after hours at the school as a janitor to earn extra money, unaware that Terri has discovered that she was experiencing a hysterical pregnancy and is not actually pregnant. He becomes closer to Emma, who has romantic feelings for him, but she ultimately curtails their time spent together, believing that he is about to start a family. To his dismay, she later becomes engaged to football coach Ken Tanaka (Patrick Gallagher).

Will's dedication to the glee club wavers when his students question his choreography skills, but after starting a well-received all-male a cappella group, the "Acafellas", he recommits to the club. In the episode "The Rhodes Not Taken", after Rachel Berry (Lea Michele) has temporarily quit the glee club, Will recruits his former classmate, high school dropout April Rhodes (Kristin Chenoweth), as the new female lead. However, she is an alcoholic and proves to be a bad influence on the kids, and he has her leave. In "Throwdown", Will's nemesis, cheerleading coach Sue Sylvester (Jane Lynch), is made co-director of the club and divides up the students, but when their fighting leads the kids to walk out in disgust, Sue steps down. In the episode "Mattress", Will uncovers Terri's fake pregnancy when he discovers her pregnancy pad in a drawer. He angrily confronts her, then walks out, but remains undecided over whether to end their marriage. He inadvertently renders the glee club ineligible to compete at Sectionals by sleeping on a mattress that they had been given for working on a television commercial, and steps down as director so they will be allowed to perform. Emma decides to postpone her wedding to Ken by several hours to accompany the glee club to Sectionals in Will's place, and the club wins. Ken ends their engagement and cancels the wedding because of this, and after he has officially ended his relationship with Terri, Will and Emma share a kiss.

In "Hell-O", Will and Emma try to start a relationship, but after he finds out that she's a virgin, they take a break. Will then proceeds to make out with the coach of rival glee club Vocal Adrenaline, Shelby Corcoran (Idina Menzel), who afterward advises him to take time to rediscover who he is now that he's ending a long marriage. In "The Power of Madonna", after Sue tells Emma that she has no control over her own body, Emma decides to "do the nasty" with Will at his place. However, they don't go through with it, and she runs out of Will's apartment without her shoes. Will admires her for "taking control by telling herself she wasn't ready", and promises to help her with her problems and start a relationship after his divorce with Terri is finalized. In the season finale, "Journey to Regionals", the glee club comes in last at the Regionals competition. The kids, heartbroken at the thought that the club is over, sing "To Sir With Love" to thank Will for all he's done. Sue, who overhears them, convinces Principal Figgins to allow the glee club another year to prove themselves. Will finally admits that he has been in love with Emma all along and kisses her, but she tells him that she has started dating her dentist, Carl Howell (John Stamos).

=== Season 2 ===
In the season two premiere, Shannon Beiste (Dot-Marie Jones) is made the new school football coach, and the cheerleading and glee club budgets are slashed in favor of football. Although he at first conspires against Coach Beiste with Sue because of the budget cuts, Will eventually befriends her. In the episode "Britney/Brittany", Will tries to impress Emma by purchasing a new car similar to that of her boyfriend, Carl, and by joining the glee club in a racy performance of "Toxic". By the end of the episode he returns the car, realizing that he should be himself. When Emma mentions that The Rocky Horror Picture Show is her favorite musical, and she and Carl have been going to see it, Will decides to have the glee club perform it, and recruits Emma to assist him. However, when Carl becomes involved and is given a role, Will joins the production himself. Carl ends up accusing Will of trying to steal Emma, and Will backs off. In "The Substitute", Will contracts a severe case of the flu and is too ill to work. His ex-wife Terri comes over uninvited to take care of him, and the two end up sleeping together. Sue fires Will and appoints his substitute, Holly Holliday (Gwyneth Paltrow), in his stead. When Holly visits to ask Will for some advice, Terri discovers them talking and assumes the worst. Will tells Terri that he shouldn't have slept with her while ill, and that their divorce stands. Will is reinstated by Sue. He subsequently learns that Emma and Carl have impulsively married while in Las Vegas. He is upset, but wishes her well. He remains in love with her, and on a drunken night months later, he drunk dials Emma and leaves a highly suggestive message on the answering machine. Unfortunately, he has mistakenly dialed Sue's number, and Sue plays the message over the school's public address system. Will decides to abstain from alcohol, and gets the glee club, who have just ended a school assembly by vomiting during a song due to imbibing, to pledge to give up drinking until after Nationals.

New Directions ekes out at tie with the Dalton Academy Warblers at the Sectionals competition, and will face them and Aural Intensity at Regionals. With the football team's glee club and non-glee members at odds, the team looks doomed to defeat at the championship game, so Will and Coach Beiste agree that the entire team has to join the glee club for one week. When Sue pulls her cheerleaders from the game, the team and glee club ultimately work together to perform the halftime show, and the team goes on to win the championship. Sue's cheerleaders lose their own Regionals, their first loss in seven years, and a seemingly depressed Sue inveigles Will to let her join the glee club for a week. She is unable to bring the club down from within, so she arranges to become the coach of Aural Intensity, hoping to defeat New Directions at Regionals, but the McKinley glee club wins.

Holly returns to McKinley as a substitute sex education teacher, and starts dating Will, though they break up after five dates. At Carl's request, Holly counsels him and Emma, as they are having difficulties: Emma is still a virgin after four months of marriage. When pressed, she admits to them that she still has some feelings for Will. Carl moves out, and soon asks Emma for an annulment of their marriage. The stress makes Emma's OCD worse, and Will urges her to get treatment, which she does, and her condition begins to improve. April returns to ask Will's help: her first attempt at a Broadway show flopped, and she wants to mount a show based on her life story entitled CrossRhodes. She urges him to star with her in the show, and Emma tells him he should try. He decides to do so: he'll be in New York anyway for the glee club's Nationals competition, so he'd just stay afterward and start rehearsals for April's show. To avoid upsetting the glee club, he doesn't tell them his plans. Emma helps him pack up his apartment. In New York, he leaves the glee club unchaperoned while he goes to the Broadway theater where April's show is being mounted, and sings "Still Got Tonight" from the stage. When the new coach of Vocal Adrenaline, Dustin Goolsby (Cheyenne Jackson), tries to shake New Directions by telling them of Will's impending Broadway debut, he realizes that he wants to continue coaching them, and gives up on Broadway. New Directions comes in twelfth of fifty teams, and Will returns with them to Ohio.

=== Season 3 ===
At the beginning of the third season, Will and Emma are living together and sleeping in the same bed, though Emma remains a virgin. The membership of New Directions is down, and their recruitment drive proves unsuccessful. Will reluctantly rejects Sugar Motta (Vanessa Lengies) after a truly awful audition has the glee club membership demanding he do so; her father makes a huge donation to the school to fund a second glee club for her, and recruits former Vocal Adrenaline director Shelby Corcoran to run it. Will suffers further defections from the glee club when first Mercedes, and then Santana and Brittany, leave to join Shelby's rival club due to a lack of soloing opportunities in New Directions.

Sue runs for Congress on a platform of cutting all funding for school arts programs, and Will's attempt to render her a figure of ridicule by glitterbombing her backfires—the viral video instead improves her standing in the polls. She manages to eliminate the budget for the school's musical, but Burt Hummel (Mike O'Malley) arranges for funding from his fellow businessmen, and because of what the arts—and Will's glee club in particular—have done for his son Kurt, he decides to run against Sue as a write-in candidate, with Will as his campaign manager, and defeats her.

The rivalry between the two McKinley glee clubs comes to a head at Sectionals in the episode "Hold On to Sixteen". Although Rachel has been suspended from school and can't compete with them, Will's New Directions defeats Shelby's club. Shelby resigns and her club dissolves, with the original defectors, plus a greatly improved Sugar, returning to New Directions with the understanding that they will be given more solos.

Will finally gets the courage to propose to Emma in the episode "Yes/No" after she blurts out that she wants to marry him, and recruits the glee club to help him select and perform the perfect song as a part of that proposal. He asks Finn to be his best man at the wedding, and Finn agrees, but when he asks Emma's parents for their blessing, he is refused. He goes ahead anyway, and after a spectacular performance, he asks Emma to marry him, and she accepts.

After a tenure position goes up in the history department of McKinley High ("The Spanish Teacher"), Will ends up on the shortlist for the spot. At the same time, his own job as Spanish teacher is put to risk when Santana complains about his teaching style and he eventually gives it up to David Martinez (guest star Ricky Martin) after taking on history at an annual basis while Emma gains the tenure role, beating out Sue in the shortlist.

=== Season 4 ===
Will excitedly walked into the glee club room and he announced that Wade "Unique" Adams had transferred and joined their club. He doesn't like their competition to be the new Rachel. He was excited by Marley's performance and cut off Jake's performance. He later learns that Jake is Puck's younger half-brother. Will choreographs the group number which Marley led.

Will suggests that Brittany should meet with Emma daily to deal with the impact of being held back to repeat her senior year.

Will and Emma also get married in the end of Season 4.

=== Season 5 ===
During Season 5, the Glee Club faces its biggest challenges as Sue finally gets her way and disbands the group. Will's spouse Emma tries to get pregnant and succeeds. Her and Will's son Daniel Finn is born during Rachel Berry's debut of Funny Girl.

=== Season 6 ===
Will starts the season as the new coach of Vocal Adrenaline (upon a recommendation from Sue, stating she needed to get him out of her hair). Learning that Rachel is rebooting New Directions, he helps build her confidence a little despite the fact that he's now her rival. However, his team, led by new lead soloist Clint, doesn't respect him and only cares about winning. Despite trying to teach the group a lesson about tolerance with help from Unique Adams after Coach Beiste undergoes gender transitioning, the egos of Vocal Adrenaline drive him to his breaking point. After helping Unique with Beiste's transitioning by secretly putting together a transgender choir under the guise of pranking McKinley, he calls out Clint and the group about their arrogance and disrespect and quits. Rachel then enlists him to help out New Directions as a consultant.

He is a groomsman at Santana and Brittany's wedding (which becomes a double wedding when Blaine and Kurt also get married), and later helps out with Myron Muskovitz's bar mitzvah. Then, when Dalton Academy burns down, he along with Rachel and Kurt take in Blaine and many of the displaced Warblers with the idea of merging them and New Directions into a supergroup to take down Vocal Adrenaline at Sectionals...much to Sue's dismay. He is present as a witness when the superintendent fires Sue over her many lies and reign of terror over the years. The merged group goes on to win Sectionals, and later Regionals and Nationals as well.

After the Nationals victory, Superintendent Harris tells Will that because of New Directions' success and his never giving up over the years, McKinley High is now designated as a performing arts school and promotes Will to principal. He hires New Directions alum Sam Evans to be the new glee coach. Five years later, McKinley is thriving as an arts school and Will watches proudly as Rachel wins her Tony Award and dedicates it to him.

== Reception ==
The Chicago Tribune's Maureen Ryan opined following Glee's pilot episode: "Casting Matthew Morrison as Will Schuester [...] was a wise move; the actor not only has a sweet voice but a hangdog hopefulness that gives a needed anchor to the show's more satirical elements." In contrast, Tom Shales for The Washington Post criticized Morrison as Will, writing: "Morrison is definitely not gleeful and doesn't seem particularly well equipped to be a high-school impresario; as pipers go, he's not even marginally pied." Robert Lloyd for the Los Angeles Times commented on the show's early episodes that the adult characters "tend more to caricature than character", stating that by contrast, "Will, as the show's only normal person over the age of 18, [can] seem a little drab". However, he noted that Will "comes alive when singing and dancing", citing his "exuberant" performance of "Gold Digger" in the episode "Showmance".

Reviewing the episode "The Rhodes Not Taken", Mike Hale of the New York Times commented on Will's actions in having former member April Rhodes (Kristin Chenoweth) re-instated in the glee club: "It's now time to wonder when the show will stop making Will behave in ways completely at odds with Mr. Morrison's bland, gentle performance. (Or, conversely, when Mr. Morrison will start playing him the way he's written.)" Mandi Bierly for Entertainment Weekly praised Morrison's acting in the episode "Vitamin D", writing: "Matthew Morrison communicates so much with his eyes. There's a softness and a longing in them that I'm always surprised Emma matches." Eric Goldman for IGN enjoyed Morrison's music performances in the episode "Mash-Up", commending: "I have to hand it to Matthew Morrison for just going for it in these sequences. There is of course something completely dorky about seeing this guy perform these songs, but Morrison infuses Will with such enjoyment in what he's doing, he completely sells it. And yes, the guy can dance."

Liz Pardue of Zap2it praised Morrison's acting in "Mattress", calling him "beyond fantastic" during the confrontation between Will and Terri. Bobby Hankinson of the Houston Chronicle wrote that he "was glad to see Will react with the appropriate level of rage", but felt that the scene became too tense, leaving him almost feeling bad for Terri. Raymund Flandez of the Wall Street Journal wrote that he was happy to see the "convoluted" fake pregnancy storyline end, commenting that it had seemed unreal to him from the outset as "Will Schue doesn't strike me as a guy who misses much of anything. [...] The covered pregnancy storyline makes a mockery of his instincts and intelligence." Aly Semigran of MTV praised "a devastated Matthew Morrison" for "nail[ing] just what a scary, sad, and life-altering moment that [was]." Gerrick Kennedy of the Los Angeles Times commended: "Matthew Morrison showed another dimension to Will, and did a remarkable job doing so. There was anger and anguish all intertwined in this bitter and broken shell of a man. And he played it well enough where you feared for Terri."

Following the broadcast of the mid-season finale episode "Sectionals", in which Will and Emma kiss, Goldman commented: "Schue and Emma finally coming together was very hard to not feel good about, even though you know it just won't be that easy when the show returns". Pardue was impressed with Will for leaving Terri, and called the kiss between Will and Emma "romantic" commenting that it made her "heart happy". Dan Snierson of Entertainment Weekly wrote that although there was satisfaction in the episode ending on the kiss, it may have been "more intriguing" to conclude with Will finding Emma's office empty, questioning whether it was too soon for the two of them to begin a relationship.

After the second season episode "The Rocky Horror Glee Show", many critics objected to Will's characterization. Emily St. James of The A.V. Club wrote that his storyline with Emma "misplac[ed] what made either of the characters enjoyable in the first place", and IGN's Robert Canning—who otherwise enjoyed the episode, and rated it 8.5/10—observed that Will was presented as being selfish and a "terrible educator", in contrast to his former role as the moral center of the show. Lisa de Moraes of the Washington Post initially found the focus on the adults a welcome change, but felt their storyline rapidly became convoluted. Anthony Benigno of the Daily News liked Will less as the episode progressed, and deemed it overall, "Creepy, vaguely uncomfortable, in slightly poor taste but well-intentioned, and ultimately, thoroughly entertaining to watch for reasons I can't quite put into words." CNN's Lisa Respers France actually enjoyed the episode for the additional depth it brought to Will and his feelings for Emma.

In April 2012, the staff of Entertainment Weekly named Will one of the "20 Most Annoying TV Characters Ever". Marc Snetiker wrote that he had "the intrigue of a blank chalkboard and the personality of a pair of pleated khakis", and sometimes made "things just seem a little less gleeful."
