= Mattress (Glee) =

- Glee episode
- Episode no.: Season 1 Episode 12
- Directed by: Elodie Keene
- Written by: Ryan Murphy
- Production code: 1ARC11
- Original air date: December 2, 2009

Guest appearances
- Patrick Gallagher as Ken Tanaka; Iqbal Theba as Principal Figgins; John Ross Bowie as Dennis; Naya Rivera as Santana Lopez; Heather Morris as Brittany Pierce; Harry Shum Jr. as Mike Chang; Dijon Talton as Matt Rutherford; Bill A. Jones as Rod Remington; Chuck Spitler as Randy Cusperberg; Max Adler as Dave Karofsky; Earlene Davis as Andrea Carmichael; James Earl as Azimio; Lauren Potter as Becky Jackson

Episode chronology
← Previous "Hairography"	Next → "Sectionals"
- Glee season 1

"Mattress", also known as "Once Upon a Mattress", is the twelfth episode of the American television series Glee. The episode premiered on the Fox network on December 2, 2009. It was written by series creator Ryan Murphy and directed by Elodie Keene. In "Mattress", the glee club discovers that they are going to be omitted from the school yearbook. Club member Rachel Berry (Lea Michele) has the team cast in a local mattress commercial in an attempt to raise their social status. Glee club director Will Schuester (Matthew Morrison) discovers that his wife Terri (Jessalyn Gilsig) has been faking her pregnancy.

The episode features cover versions of four songs, studio recordings of three of which were released as singles, available for digital download, and are also included on the album Glee: The Music, Volume 2. "Mattress" was watched by 8.15 million US viewers, Glee's series high at that point. It received mixed reviews from critics. The conclusion of the fake pregnancy storyline attracted praise, as did Gilsig and Morrison's acting, however Liz Pardue of Zap2it expressed dismay that so few songs were performed, while Raymund Flandez of the Wall Street Journal deemed "Jump" "the only memorable song of the episode".

== Plot ==
Cheerleading coach Sue Sylvester (Jane Lynch) convinces Principal Figgins (Iqbal Theba) not to include a photograph of the glee club in the school yearbook, as in previous years, glee club photographs have been heavily defaced in the library copy of the yearbook by fellow students. Club director Will Schuester (Matthew Morrison) personally buys a meager section of advertising space in the book so that a photograph featuring at least two members can be included. Fearing unpopularity, the club nominates Rachel (Lea Michele) to represent them in the photograph. Rachel convinces Finn (Cory Monteith) to appear alongside her, but after being teased by his peers, he drops out. When it transpires that the school photographer (John Ross Bowie) is soon to direct a commercial for his brother-in-law, a local mattress store owner, Rachel convinces him to cast the glee club in it, believing that local celebrity status will prevent the other students from mocking them.

Will is dismayed to learn that his close friend, guidance counselor Emma Pillsbury (Jayma Mays), has arranged to marry her fiancé, football coach Ken Tanaka (Patrick Gallagher), on the same day the glee club will compete at sectionals. Will goes on to discover that his wife Terri (Jessalyn Gilsig) has been lying to him for months about her supposed pregnancy. She actually experienced a hysterical pregnancy and hid the truth from him for several months by wearing a pregnancy pad under her clothes, while planning to secretly adopt Quinn's (Dianna Agron) baby. Will walks out on her and spends the night at the school, sleeping on one of the mattresses given to the glee club in payment for their commercial.

Sue informs Will that the club receiving payment for the commercial revokes their amateur status, and thus their eligibility to compete at sectionals. Quinn, who has been trying to convince Sue to let her appear in the cheerleaders' photographs despite being removed from the team due to her pregnancy, reminds Sue that as their coach she has often given the cheerleaders perks which would also render them ineligible for competition. She demands that Sue sacrifice one of the cheerleaders' six pages in the yearbook to the glee club. Sue agrees, and accepts Quinn back onto the cheerleading team, but Quinn tells her she no longer wishes to be a cheerleader. Will announces that he will not be accompanying the club to sectionals, as he was the one who accepted payment, and as such they will only be allowed to compete without his involvement. The glee club then has their group photograph taken for the yearbook, but the copy in the library is subsequently defaced by hockey player Dave Karofsky (Max Adler) and football player Azimio (James Earl).

== Production ==
"Mattress" was written by series creator Ryan Murphy and directed by Elodie Keene. Recurring characters who appear in the episode are glee club members Brittany Pierce (Heather Morris), Santana Lopez (Naya Rivera), Mike Chang (Harry Shum Jr.) and Matt Rutherford (Dijon Talton), Principal Figgins (Iqbal Theba), football coach Ken Tanaka (Patrick Gallagher), local news anchors Rod Remington (Bill A. Jones) and Andrea Carmichael (Earlene Davis), hockey player Dave Karofsky (Max Adler) and football player Azimio (James Earl). John Ross Bowie guest-stars as school photographer Dennis, and Chuck Spitler plays his brother-in-law, mattress store owner Randy Cusperberg.

The episode features cover versions of "Smile" by Lily Allen, "Jump" by Van Halen, "Smile" by Charlie Chaplin, and "When You're Smiling" by Louis Armstrong. Studio recordings of each of the songs except "When You're Smiling" were released as singles, available for digital download, and are also included on the album Glee: The Music, Volume 2.

"Terri's problem is that she keeps trying to go back to that moment in high school where it was like magic. I think she wants to live back in that place. Will's obviously matured past that point and she just has no tools to communicate those insecurities. But she does love him."

— Jessalyn Gilsig on Terri and Will's relationship.

Jessalyn Gilsig referred to the confrontation between Terri and Will in "Mattress" as "The Reckoning". She described it as sad to shoot, as she and Morrison were so invested in the storyline, and explained: "What I hope is conveyed is that you see the child inside Terri. You see the fear." Gilsig commented that viewers had been wondering why Will was taking so long to discover Terri was not actually pregnant, explaining: "I think people have been asking 'How slow is this guy?!'. But [in "Mattress"] Will finally reflects that he is a fully evolved human being and puts two and two together." She noted that while Will and Emma "are adorable together", she still believes in Terri and Will as a couple as: "I think that she really loves him. People do crazy things out of deep, deep insecurity. She's obviously flawed, but I think she has love in her heart." While fan reaction to her character had previously resulted in a backlash Gilsig found "tough", she hoped that "Mattress" would be the episode in which "anti-Terri fans joined Team Terri".

== Reception ==
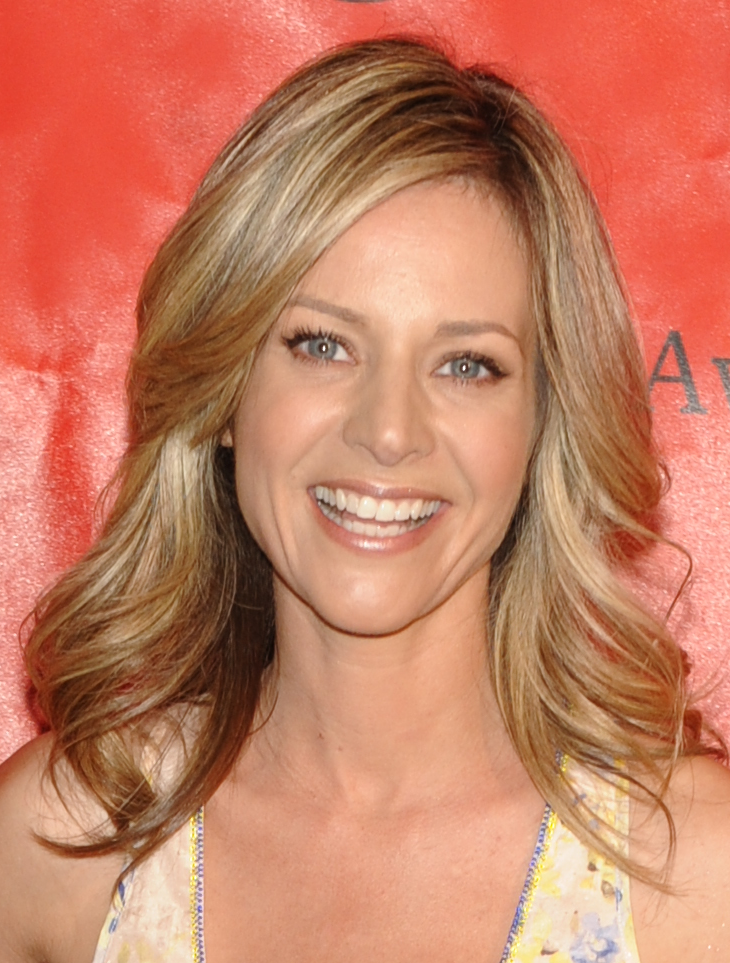
Critics were pleased to see Gilsig's fake pregnancy storyline conclude.

"Mattress" was watched by 8.15 million US viewers, Glee's series high in the 2009–10 television season at the time of its original broadcast. It achieved a 3.6/10 rating/share in the 18-49 demographic, again the show's season high at the time, and a 4.3/12 rating/share with adults 18-34, both its series high and the highest rating in the demographic for the night of broadcast. In Canada, it was the ninth most watched show for the week of broadcast, attaining 1.8 million viewers. The episode received mixed reviews from critics. Entertainment Weekly's Dan Snierson wrote that "Mattress" "felt like a step forward after last week's all-over-the-place hair toss", and called the "poignant" ending "one of Glee's best". In contrast, Mike Hale of the New York Times wrote that with "Mattress", Glee appeared to be "taking a break" ahead of the midseason finale episode "Sectionals". Liz Pardue of Zap2it was relieved that "Mattress" brought the fake pregnancy storyline to an end. She noted, however, that she was still unsatisfied with the episode, as the conclusion to the storyline should have come sooner, and there were too few songs featured.

Bobby Hankinson of the Houston Chronicle called the episode "pretty good" noting that he "wasn't crazy about any of the songs" but enjoyed the plot development, particularly the confrontation between Terri and Will. Raymund Flandez of the Wall Street Journal was happy to see the "convoluted" fake pregnancy storyline end, and called the performance of "Jump" "lively" and the stunts "incredible", though he wrote that it was "the only memorable song of the episode". Gerrick Kennedy of the Los Angeles Times noted that in previous reviews, he had "never been shy of [his] disdain for Mrs. Schuester", but that his hatred of Terri "vanished" once the lie was over, praising the confrontation between Will and Terri. MTV's Aly Semigran praised both actors, especially "a devastated Matthew Morrison" for having "nailed just what a scary, sad, and life-altering moment" it was. She deemed "Jump" both "delightful" and the "giddiest musical number on the show to date".
