= Something's Gotta Change =

Something's Gotta Change may refer to:

- "Something's Gotta Change", a song by Tina Arena from her 2001 album Just Me
- "Something's Gotta Change", a song by David Phelps from his 2005 album Life Is a Church
