= Life Is Great and Gettin' Better! =

Studio album by Jeff & Sheri Easter
- Released: January 23, 2007
- Genre: Contemporary Christian music, Southern Gospel
- Producer: Daywind Records

Jeff & Sheri Easter chronology
It Feels Like Christmas Again (2005)	Life Is Great and Gettin' Better! (2007)	We Are Family (2009)

Professional ratings
Review scores
Source	Rating
AllMusic	(?)

Life Is Great and Gettin' Better! is an album from Christian duo Jeff & Sheri Easter. It was released on January 23, 2007.

== Track listing ==
1. "Life Is Great and Gettin' Better" (Easter, Wright) - 2:45
2. "Livin' in the Rain" (Hawkins, LaBar) - 3:08
3. "Over and Over" (Smith) - 3:52
4. "Joshua's Song" (Easter) - 3:30
5. "Feelin' Alright, Doin' Okay" (Wright) - 3:56
6. "I Wouldn't Change You If I Could" (Jones, Smith) - 3:05
7. "All the Days That End in Why" (Easter) - 4:32
8. "A Lullaby" (Easter) - 3:40
9. "Come See Me" (Gaither, J.) - 4:15
10. "Daddy Hung the Moon" (Westley, Willett) - 4:00
11. "Old Chunk of Coal" (Shaver) - 3:20
12. "Dance" (Willett) - 5:07

== Awards ==
The album was nominated to a Dove Award for Country Album of the Year at the 39th GMA Dove Awards.
