= Speak to Me (disambiguation) =

"Speak to Me" is a song by Pink Floyd from the 1973 album The Dark Side of the Moon. The phrase may also refer to:

- "Speak to Me", a song by Jackie Lomax from the 1969 album Is This What You Want?
- "Speak to Me", a song by Audio Adrenaline from the 2001 album Lift
- Speak to Me (Geoff Moore album), a 2007 album by Geoff Moore
- Speak to Me, a 2008 EP by Imagine Dragons
- "Speak to Me" (Roxette song), from the 2011 album Charm School
- "Speak to Me" (Amy Lee song), 2017
- "Speak to Me" (Depeche Mode song), from the 2023 album Memento Mori
- Speak to Me (Julian Lage album), 2024
