= Legacy of Love =

Legacy of Love: David Phelps Live!

Live album by David Phelps
- Released: September 12, 2006
- Genre: Gospel music, CCM
- Label: Word

David Phelps chronology
Life Is a Church (2005)	Legacy of Love: David Phelps Live! (2006)	No More Night: Live in Birmingham (2007)

Legacy of Love is a live CD/DVD from Christian singer David Phelps. It was released on September 12, 2006 by Word Records.

== Track listing ==
=== DVD ===
1. "Virtuoso" (Intro)
2. "Virtuoso" (Hamm, Phelps)
3. "Arms Open Wide" (Baloche)
4. "How Great Thou Art" (Hine)
5. "Already There" (Hamm, Phelps)
6. "God Will Take Care of You" (Clark, Fowler, Walls)
7. "Just as I Am" (Bradbury, Elliot, Public Domain)
8. "Just as I Am" (Morgan, Phelps)
9. "My Child Is Coming Home" (Jennings, Penrod, Phelps)
10. "With His Love (Sing Holy)" (Cox)
11. "Legacy of Love" (Morgan, Phelps)
12. "Bring Him Home" (Boublil, Kretzmer, Schönberg)
13. "The Star-Spangled Banner" (Key, Phelps, Smith)
14. "There Is a River" (Sapp, Sapp)
15. "Gentle Savior" (Brick, Matthews, Phelps)
16. "Interlude: Behold the Lamb"
17. "Behold the Lamb" (Rambo)
18. "End of the Beginning" (Phelps)

=== CD ===
1. "Virtuoso" (Intro) - 1:39
2. "Virtuoso" (Hamm, Phelps) - 5:03
3. "How Great Thou Art" (Hine) - 3:29
4. "Already There" (Hamm, Phelps) - 5:21
5. "God Will Take Care of You" (Clark, Fowler, Walls) - 4:55
6. "Just as I Am" (Bradbury, Elliot, Public Domain) - 0:53
7. "Just as I Am" (Morgan, Phelps) - 3:52
8. "My Child Is Coming Home" (Jennings, Penrod, Phelps) - 3:23
9. "With His Love (Sing Holy)" (Cox) - 4:23
10. "Legacy of Love" (Morgan, Phelps) - 4:00
11. "Bring Him Home" (Boublil, Kretzmer, Schönberg) - 4:13
12. "The Star-Spangled Banner" (Key, Phelps, Smith) - 4:22
13. "There Is a River" (Sapp, Sapp) - 5:18
14. "Gentle Savior" (Brick, Matthews, Phelps) - 4:53
15. "End of the Beginning" (Phelps) - 5:48

== Awards ==
The album received a nomination two Dove Award nominations: Long Form Music Video of the Year and Inspirational Album of the Year, at the 38th GMA Dove Awards.

== Chart performance ==
The album peaked at #28 on Billboard's Christian Albums and #44 on Heatseekers.
