= Awakening (song) =

Single by Switchfoot

from the album Oh! Gravity.
- Released: March 26, 2007
- Recorded: 2006
- Genre: Alternative rock
- Length: 4:08
- Label: Columbia/Sony BMG
- Songwriter: Jon Foreman
- Producer: Steve Lillywhite

Switchfoot singles chronology
"Oh! Gravity." (2006)	"Awakening" (2007)	"Head over Heels (In This Life)" (2007)

"Awakening" is the second single from Switchfoot's sixth studio album, Oh! Gravity. The single was released to radio in March 2007. It hit Hot AC radio stations with an impact day of March 26, 2007 and eventually peaked at No. 54 on that format's charts. It was also slated for release to Top 40, Alternative, and Active Rock stations, but saw virtually no play on any of those formats.

== Song history ==
The song was written during some time off between tours supporting the band's fifth record, Nothing Is Sound. "We had two or three weeks off tour in January of this last year," bassist Tim Foreman said. "We were touring in support of 'Nothing is Sound' and we had some time to go into the studio. "We didn't really have a plan," noted Switchfoot singer/songwriter Jon Foreman about that time in the studio. This lack of deadline pressure allowed the band to write music freely, and out of those sessions came "Awakening."

It was the first official track recorded when it came time to begin actual recording for Oh! Gravity. and was produced by Steve Lillywhite, whose credits include U2 and Dave Matthews Band. "We just love his big-picture input on the song 'Awakening.'” said Tim.

About the song itself, songwriter Jon Foreman said, "Perhaps to be truly reborn death is not optional. Here’s a firsthand story about new life, it always starts at the bottom."

== Music video ==
=== Release and making of ===
A music video for this song was filmed February 28, 2007 in Toronto, one of the stops on the band's Winter/Spring Tour. Brandon Dickerson (director of "You Already Take Me There" and "New Way to Be Human" videos) directed the Awakening music video. It was leaked, April 5 by the band's web content designer, Dale Manning on YouTube.

The official release date for the music video was Tuesday, April 10. It premiered on the band's official YouTube account and on the website. The video is different from the band's previous videos because the video is not overtly related to the song or the meaning of the song. It is also different in the fact that the band funded the video out of their own pockets, without support from their record label.

The creation of the video also was unique in the fact that Dickerson used a never-before-used technique dubbed "paper-mation." Instead of using clay in the more common technique of "claymation," the band employed paper print-outs of their performances, and were able to achieve the effect of animation.

=== Video plot ===
The Awakening music video mainly focuses on two men (Tony Hale and Adam Campbell), who first step out of an elevator and play a cardboard version of Guitar Hero in their apartments. As they play, they lip-synch the words to the song. Later on in the video, a woman (Jayma Mays) is seen playing Dance Dance Revolution along with the other two gamers. The only clips of the band playing the song in live action are shown early in the video as the guitars kick in. The band are later shown throughout the rest of the video as animated characters in a cardboard television. (Jon Foreman is seen playing Guitar Hero near the end of the video).

== Promotion ==
Switchfoot's major label Columbia/Sony BMG put out very little support for the single. The video was completely funded by the band, with no help from the label, and by all accounts, the radio single was not promoted to radio stations at all. Whether this incident was the cause or not, Switchfoot and Sony parted ways shortly after the release of this single.

In response to the lack of label-side support, the band's fans took it upon themselves to help promote the video in more of a grassroots marketing way. The website We're Awakening was originally created with the intent of promoting the song.

== Public and critical response ==
- On YouTube, "Awakening" has reached as high as the 67th "most linked to" entertainment video of all time on the site.
- The official YouTube music video reached over 1,000,000 views in under three months,. Despite its success, the record company (Columbia/Sony BMG) failed to capitalize, leading to major disappointment among the band's fans and musical enthusiasts alike.
- "Awakening" Hit FUSE TV's No. 1 Countdown as the top "Guilty Pleasure," knocking out Evanescence's Sweet Sacrifice, and retaining the top spot for 4 months. It was retired September 18, 2007.
- The song peaked at #54 on Hot AC/Adult Top 40 Radio.
- The song reached #3 on the Christian CHR charts.
- The song reached #16 on the Billboard Hot Christian Songs chart.
- The song was #37 on the Billboard Year-End Christian Songs Chart.

== Awards ==
In 2008, the song was nominated for two Dove Awards: Rock/Contemporary Recorded Song of the Year and Long Form Music Video of the Year at the 39th GMA Dove Awards.
