= Southwest Virginia Community College =

College in Cedar Bluff, Virginia, U.S.

Coordinates: 37°0′19.7″N 81°47′48.2″W

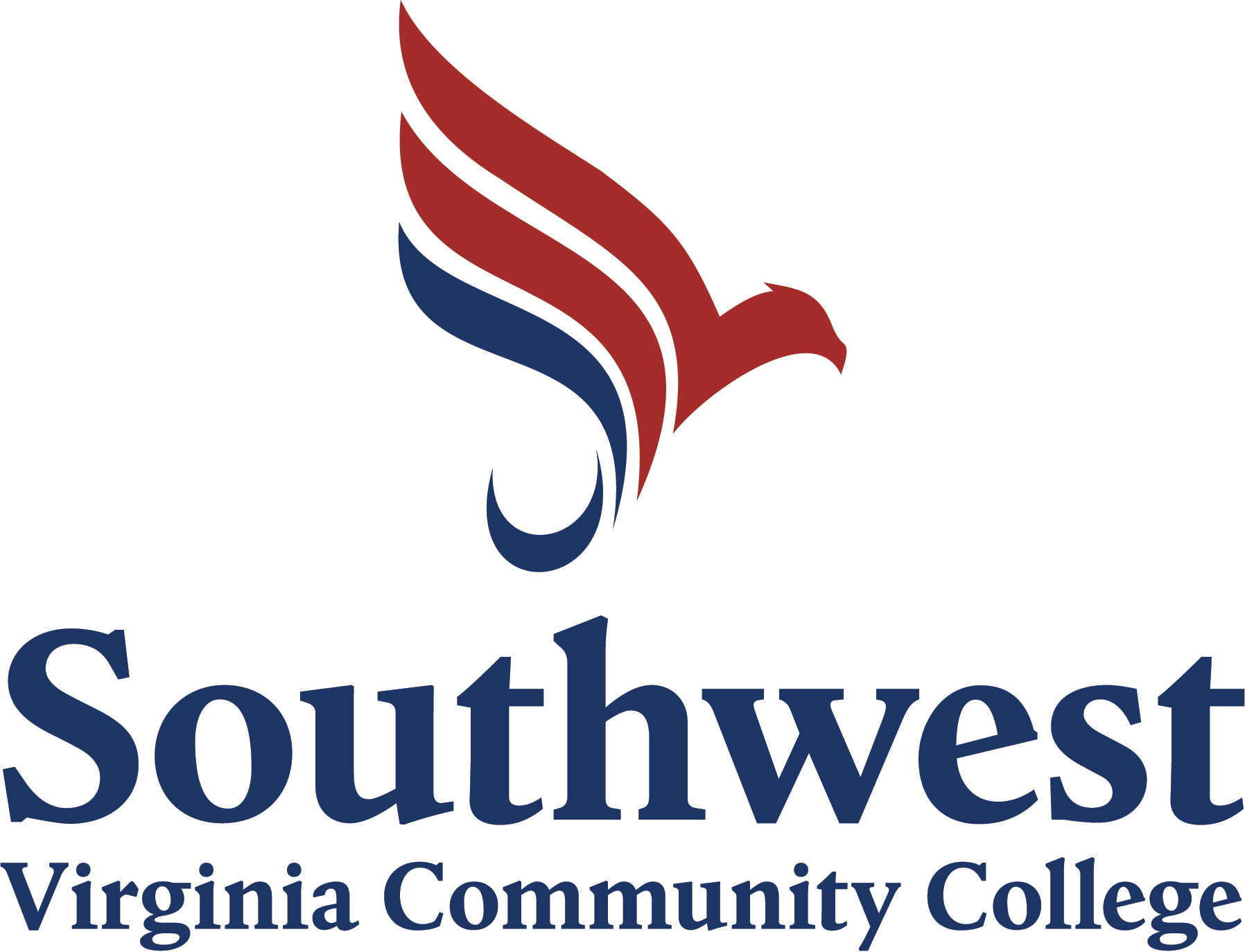
- Type: Community college
- Established: 1968; 58 years ago
- Location: 724 Community College Rd., Cedar Bluff, Virginia, 24609, United States
- Website: Official website

Southwest Virginia Community College (SWCC) is a public community college in Cedar Bluff. It is part of the Virginia Community College System. SWCC was opened in 1968 to serve the residents of Buchanan, Russell and Tazewell counties, as well as portions of Dickenson County.

== Presidents ==
- Clinton Hayes (July 1, 2025 - Present)
- Tommy F. Wright (January 8, 2018 – June 30, 2024)
- J. Mark Estepp (July 2, 2007 – January 7, 2018)
- William Snyder (interim president for the college while a search for Dr. King's replacement was conducted)
- Charles R. King (founding president, retired in December 2006)

== Notable alumni ==
- Jayma Mays (graduate) - An American actress and singer.
- Sean Spencer (attended) - professional mixed martial artist, current UFC welterweight
- Noah Spencer (graduate)- An American country music musician, appeared on The Voice
