= One Wintry Night =

One Wintry Night: A David Phelps Christmas

Studio album by David Phelps
- Released: September 25, 2007
- Genre: Gospel music, CCM
- Label: Word
- Producer: Monroe Jones

David Phelps chronology
No More Night: Live in Birmingham (2007)	One Wintry Night: A David Phelps Christmas (2007)	The Voice (2008)

One Wintry Night: A David Phelps Christmas is a Christmas album from Christian singer David Phelps. It was released on September 25, 2007 by Word Records.

== Track listing ==
All songs written by David Phelps, except where noted.

1. "O Come, O Come, Emmanuel" (Prelude) (Public Domain) - 2:02
2. "The Singer (Let There Be Light)" - 3:48
3. "Hallelujah!" - 3:04
4. "Blue Christmas" (Billy Hayes, Jay W. Johnson) - 3:34
5. "Lully, Lullay (With What Child Is This?)" (Interlude) (Public Domain) - 2:44
6. "Away in a Manger (with Sleep, Little Baby)" (William J. Kirkpatrick, Phelps) - 4:56
7. "One Wintry Night" - 4:41
8. "If Everyone Believed" - 3:14
9. "If Christmas Never Came" - 4:36
10. "Silent Night" (Interlude) (Franz Xaver Gruber, Moore) - 2:40
11. "O Holy Night" (Adolphe Adam, John Sullivan Dwight) - 5:13
12. "Hark the Herald!" - 4:06
13. "One King" - 4:38
14. "Santa Claus Is Coming to Town" (Interlude) (John Frederick Coots, Haven Gillespie) - 2:25
15. "Santa Claus Tonight" - 2:56

== Personnel ==
- David Phelps – vocals
- Jeff Roach – keyboards, string arrangements
- Gary Burnette – acoustic guitars, electric guitars
- Scott Denté – acoustic guitars, electric guitars
- Mark Hill – bass guitar
- Ken Lewis – drums, percussion
- Jack Daniels – harmonica
- Mike Haynes – trumpet, flugelhorn
- Chris Carmichael – strings
- Love Sponge String Quartet:
  - John Catchings – cello
  - Monisa Angel – viola
  - David Angell – violin
  - David Davidson – violin
- Monroe Jones – string arrangements
- Steve Lamb – music copyist
- Sonya Isaacs – vocals

=== Production ===
- Monroe Jones – producer, engineer
- Jim Dineen – engineer
- Fred Paragano – engineer, mixing
- Tom Laune – mixing
- Travis Palmer – additional engineer, assistant engineer, mix assistant
- Andrew Mendelson – mastering at Georgetown Masters (Nashville, Tennessee)
- Natthaphol Abhigantaphand – mastering assistant
- Brent Kaye – mastering assistant
- Conor Farley – A&R
- Jamie Kiner – production coordinator
- Katherine Petillo – art direction
- Ray Roper – design
- David Kaufman – wardrobe

== Reception ==
=== Chart performance ===
The album peaked at #23 on Billboard's Christian Albums and #7 on Holiday Albums.

== Awards ==
The album received a nomination at the 39th GMA Dove Awards for Christmas Album of the Year.
