= No More Night: Live in Birmingham =

Live album by David Phelps
- Released: September 25, 2007
- Recorded: 2006; Birmingham, Alabama, USA
- Genre: Gospel music, CCM
- Length: 65:00
- Label: Word

David Phelps chronology
Legacy of Love (2006)	No More Night: Live in Birmingham (2007)	One Wintry Night (2007)

No More Night: Live in Birmingham is a live CD/DVD from a Christian singer David Phelps. It was recorded during a presentation at the Alabama Theatre in Birmingham, Alabama in 2006. It was released on September 25, 2007 by Word Records.

== Track listing ==
=== DVD ===
1. "No Place" - 4:03
2. "Long Time Coming" - 3:14
3. "My Jesus, I Love Thee" - 3:50
4. "Life Is A Church" - 5:12
5. "Break Free" - 4:50
6. "He Looked Beyond My Fault" - 4:15
7. "Revelation" - 4:42
8. "Second Fiddle" - 3:57
9. "Something's Gotta Change" - 3:33
10. "Visions Of God" - 4:59
11. "It Is Well" - 3:14
12. "That's What Love Is" - 4:55
13. "The Love Of God" - 3:37
14. "If That Isn't Love" - 5:16
15. "No More Night" - 5:23

=== CD ===
1. "No Place" - 4:03
2. "Long Time Coming" - 3:14
3. "My Jesus, I Love Thee" - 3:50
4. "Life Is A Church" - 5:12
5. "Break Free" - 4:50
6. "He Looked Beyond My Fault" - 4:15
7. "Revelation" - 4:42
8. "Second Fiddle" - 3:57
9. "Something's Gotta Change" - 3:33
10. "Visions Of God" - 4:59
11. "It Is Well" - 3:14
12. "That's What Love Is" - 4:55
13. "The Love Of God" - 3:37
14. "If That Isn't Love" - 5:16
15. "No More Night" - 5:23

== Personnel ==
=== Musicians ===
- David Phelps – lead vocals
- Jack Daniels – keyboards, music director
- Mike Bauer – guitars
- Adam Nitti – bass
- Will Denton – drums
- Andrea Springall – violin

=== Background vocals ===
- Michael Adler – choir director
- Linda Adler, Luke Adler, Allie Arrington, Kate Bowers, Paul E. Carter, Bonita Conley, Edward E. Crenshaw, Jack Daniels, Anthony Evans, Carly Fair, Juli Henderson, Sylvia Hollins, A. Jabari Hoyett, Lori Phelps, Kelly Pittman, Grayson Proctor, Madi Proctor, Sherri Proctor, John Adam Reed, Vickie Stokes, Alex Tisdale, Lindy Walker and Stephanie B. Watson – singers

Summerfest Previews Children's Choir

- Carolyn Violi – choir director
- Ali Bloomston, Elizabeth Edwards, Marilyn Gray, Louise Kidd, Catherine Kinney, Riley Logsdon, Callie Phelps, Grant Phelps, Maggie Beth Phelps, Sara Anne Stringfellow, Morgan Walston and Savannah Weidman – singers

=== Recording and Production ===
- David Phelps – producer, song producer, post-production, arrangements
- Jim Chaffee – producer
- Russell E. Hall – director
- Kimberly Ryan White – associate director
- Paul Corley – producer, engineer, post-production
- Rudy Landa – producer
- Tre Corley – engineer, mixing, editing
- Dalin O'Brien – engineer
- Jack Daniels – post-production
- Chad Landers – lighting design, scenic design, liner notes
- Katherine Petillo – art direction
- Ralph Anderson – photography
- Michael Hanson – photography
- Russell Kern – hair stylist, make-up

== Awards ==
The album received a nomination at the 39th GMA Dove Awards for Long Form Music Video of Year.
