= Geoff Moore =

American singer

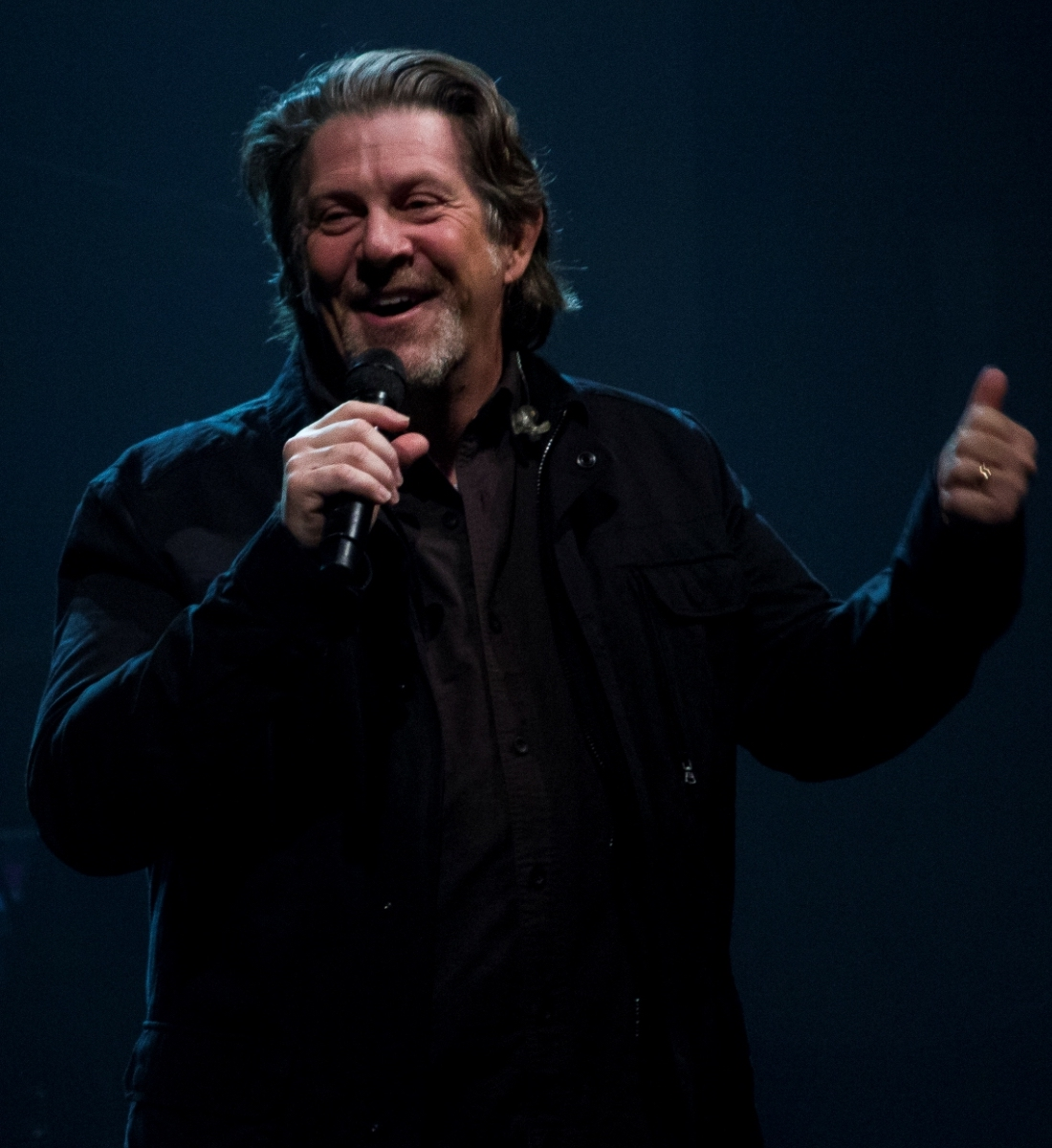
- Moore in 2014

Background information
- Born: February 22, 1961 (age 65); Flint, Michigan, U.S.
- Genres: CCM, Christian rock, pop
- Occupations: Singer, songwriter
- Years active: 1983–present
- Labels: Sparrow, Forefront
- Website: geoffmoore.com

Geoff Moore (born February 22, 1961) is an American contemporary Christian music singer. He began recording as a solo artist in 1984. In 1987, he formed Geoff Moore and The Distance, his touring band, which released eight albums generating a string of No. 1 radio hits throughout their 10+-year tenure. In 1998, Geoff retired the band from full-time touring. After a "farewell tour", Moore has continued as a solo artist, releasing eight more records between 1999 and 2015. The Next Thing was released in April 2016, making it his 25th album to date.

Geoff is also an advocate for underprivileged children. He has partnered with Compassion International since 1985, being a spokesman and advocate for their work in releasing children from poverty throughout the developing world. He also works with Showhope, an organization founded by his close friends Steven and Mary Beth Chapman. Showhope cares for orphan children and helps assist with international adoptions.

Geoff Moore is co-founder of an outdoor adventure company called Fellowship Adventures. Founded in 2014, Fellowship Adventures focuses on small group hunting, fishing, adventure and expeditions.

== Early years ==
Moore was born in Flint, Michigan in 1961. His father played baseball for the Toledo Mud Hens, and later ran a steel fabrication plant. He attended Holly Area Schools at Patterson Elementary, Holly, MI through grade six and then started attending Brandon Schools in Ortonville, MI. He began singing while he was at Taylor University living in Wengatz Hall. At the time that he became a classmate to White Hearts future lead singer, Rick Florian, when he stood in for the lead singer of his roommate's band. He graduated from Taylor in 1983. Newly married, he moved to Nashville soon after college. He was able to break into the music industry with the assistance of Michael W. Smith when the two met in the clothing store where Moore worked. He signed a publishing contract with Paragon Music, and began writing songs and singing on demo recordings. While with Paragon he wrote songs for fellow Christian singer and songwriter, Steven Curtis Chapman. Since that time, they have become best friends and have co-written numerous songs together, including the title track on Chapman's 1992 Dove Award and Grammy winning release The Great Adventure.

During the mid-1980s, Moore recorded three solo albums released on the Power Discs label, including Where are the Other Nine?, Over the Edge and The Distance. After signing to Sparrow Records in 1987, he put together a touring band, called "the Distance", to continue with his career.

== Geoff Moore and the Distance ==
Geoff Moore and the Distance
- Genres: CCM. rock, pop
- Years active: 1987–1998
- Labels: Sparrow, ForeFront, Chordant
- Past members: Geoff Moore; Dale Oliver; Lang Bliss; Arlin Troyer; Roscoe Meek; Geof Barkley; Gary Mullett; Greg Herrington; Chuck Conner; Joel McCreight; Guy Platter

In 1988, Geoff Moore and the Distance released their first official album together, entitled A Place to Stand. They also recorded Foundations in 1989 for Sparrow Records. After a year of touring, they jumped to Forefront Records and recorded Pure and Simple in 1990.

They followed in 1992 with A Friend Like U. This album would garner them their first real US Christian radio exposure with its title song. This started their most prolific period with the Grammy-nominated albums Ev-O-Lu-Tion in 1993 and Homerun in 1995. This album produced US Christian radio hits like "Evolution Redefined", "Life Together" and "Home Run". The video for "Home Run" featured former Major League All-Star pitcher Tim Burke.

In 1995, Benson released a compilation of hits from Moore's first solo albums titled The Early Years. The following year the band released a double-disc greatest hits compilation which contained new unreleased bonus tracks as well as a live performance from Rome, Georgia. In 1997, the band released Threads, another Grammy-nominated album which featured a cover of The Who's "I'm Free" as its lead single. After more than ten years with the Distance, which he called "an incredible journey" in the Star Tribune, Moore decided to disband the group and go his own way in 1998. In 1999 Moore returned to the studio to begin work on a new solo record. This began a new season of his music career which is still active today.

The Distance members were:

- Roscoe Meek – guitar (1990–1995)
- Guy Platter – guitar (1993–1994)
- Dale Oliver – guitar (1987–1989)
- Lang Bliss – drums (1987–1989)
- Arlin Troyer – bass guitar (1987–1990)
- Geof Barkley – keyboards, vocals (1988–1998)
- Gary Mullett – bass guitar (1990–1998)
- Greg Herrington – drums (1990–1994)
- Chuck Conner – drums (1995–1998)
- Joel McCreight – guitar (1996–1998)

== Solo career ==
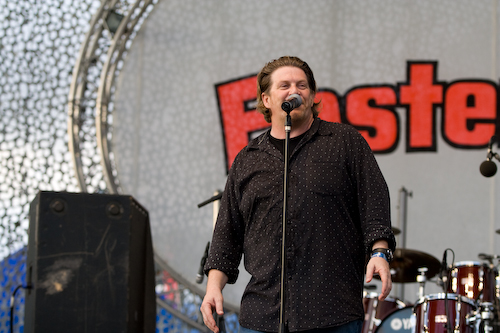
Geoff Moore performing at Easterfest 2008

In 1999, after a short time off, Moore emerged with his eponymous solo album on Forefront Records. In 2002 he followed it up with A Beautiful Sound. Near the end of 2005 he released two new studio albums independently, Every Single One Part I and Every Single One Part II,. The albums combined original songs and re-recorded selections from the out of print Forefront Records albums with The Distance.

Moore's next project Speak to Me, released in 2007 on Rocketown Records was nominated for a Dove Award for Inspirational Album of the Year. After putting together All Along the Road Part I and All Along the Road Part II, a re-release of Every Single One with alternate tracks, Moore released Saying Grace, a collection of songs that reflect back to his upbringing, expressing "gratefulness" for family, for tradition, and grace in the midst of uncertainty. In 2013, Moore compiled 25 Favorites, a "best of" double-disc, including the re-recorded material and remastered songs.

In 2015, work began on The Next Thing, his first crowdfunded recording that is scheduled to release in April 2016.

In addition to songwriting, recording, and touring, Moore enjoys hunting, fishing, and other outdoor pursuits. He and his wife have been married for 32 years, and have two sons and two adopted daughters from China.

== Discography ==
Early recordings as a solo artist (1984–1988)

- Where Are the Other Nine? [Power Discs, 1984] [Remastered CD, Girder Records, 2020]
- Over the Edge [Power Discs, 1986] [Remastered CD, Girder Records, 2020]
- The Distance [Power Discs, 1987] [Remastered CD, Girder Records, 2020]

Geoff Moore & the Distance (1988–1998)

- A Place to Stand [Sparrow, 1988] [Remastered CD, Girder Records, 2025]
- Foundations [Sparrow, 1989] [Remastered CD, Girder Records, 2025]
- Pure & Simple [ForeFront], 1990]
- A Friend Like U [ForeFront, 1992]
- Evolution [ForeFront, 1993]
- Evolution: Extended Play Remixes [ForeFront, 1995]
- Home Run [ForeFront, 1995]
- Home Run: The Single [ForeFront, 1996]
- More Than Gold: The Single, [ForeFront 1996]
- Greatest Hits (double-disc set, including the "Live Set") [ForeFront, 1996]
- Threads [ForeFront, 1997]

Recordings as a solo artist (1999 – present)

- Geoff Moore [ForeFront], 1999]
- A Beautiful Sound [ForeFront, 2002]
- Every Single One – Part I and II [Independent, 2005]
- All Along the Road – Vol I and II [Independent, 2006]
- Speak to Me [Rocketown, 2007]
- Saying Grace [Independent, 2011]
- 25 Favorites [double-disc set, released 2013]
- The Next Thing [release date: April 2016]

Other compilations and collaborative projects

- Air Raves – Christian Radio's Best, "Where are the other Nine?" [Greentree, 1986]
- Christmas, "Jingle Bell Rock" (with The Distance) [Sparrow Records, 1988]
- All the Good Music [Power Discs, 1988]
- On the Forefront: The Best Of Rock & Rap – Volume 1, "Rescue Me" [ForeFront, 1991]
- Christmas, "Jingle Bell Rock" (with The Distance) [Sparrow, 1993]
- Familiar Stranger: The Early Works of Geoff Moore (compilation 1984–1987) [Benson, 1995]
- The Early Years (compilation 1988–1992) [ForeFront, 1995]
- One Way: The Songs Of Larry Norman, "U.F.O" (with The Distance) [ForeFront, 1995]
- WOW 1996: The Year's 30 Top Christian Artists & Songs, "Home Run" [Sparrow, 1995]
- More Than Gold: A Christian Music Tribute, "Home Run," "More Than Gold" (with The Distance) [ForeFront, 1996]
- WOW 1997, "More Than Gold" [Sparrow, 1996]
- Super Saturday Limited Edition CD, "Only A Fool" (from Threads) (with The Distance) [Chordant, 1997]
- Seltzer 2, "I'm Free" (with The Distance) [ForeFront, 1998]
- Get Real! - 1998 Alabama Youth Evangelism Conference, "Only a Fool" (with The Distance) [StarSong, 1998]
- Ten: The Birthday Album, "Second Birthday", "Why Should The Devil (Have All The Good Music)", "When All Is Said and Done" (with The Distance) [ForeFront, 1998]
- Christmas on the Rock, "Jingle Bell Rock" (with The Distance) [Straightway, 1998]
- Songs 4 Life – Lift Your Spirit!, "Listen To Our Hearts" [Time Life, 1998]
- WWJD: What Would Jesus Do?, "The In Betweens" (with The Distance, from Threads) [ForeFront, 1999]
- McCaughey Septuplets: Sweet Dreams, "My Dream Come True" [Sony, 1999]
- Pass It On – Leaving a Legacy for a Lifetime, "Pass It On", "Be There" [2000]
- Keep the Faith 2000: Overcoming Stress & Anxiety, "The Vow" [Chordant, 2000]
- Secrets of the Vine: Music... A Worship Experience, "In Christ Alone" (with Adrienne Liesching) [ForeFront, 2002]
- I Will Be Here: 25 Of Today's Best Wedding & Love Songs, "If You Could See What I See" [Sparrow, 2002]
- Left Behind Worship: God Is With Us, "In Christ Alone" [ForeFront, 2002]
- WOW Worship (Yellow), "In Christ Alone" (with Adrienne Liesching) [Provident, 2003]
- A Life God Rewards, "Remind Me O God" [ForeFront, 2003]
- It Takes Two: 15 Collaborations & Duets, "In Christ Alone" (with Adrienne Liesching) [Sparrow, 2003]
- Songs 4 Love – Songs 4 Life, "If You Could See What I See" [Time Life, 2004]
- The Ultimate Collection: Love Songs, "If You Could See What I See" [EMI CMG, 2006]
- The Very Best Of Geoff Moore & The Distance [ForeFront/EMI, 2006]
- The Daraja Children's Choir of Africa, "Holy Is the Lord" [IMI, 2008]
- Ring the Bells – A Christmas Offering, "Emmanuel" [2008]
- Glory Revealed II: The Word of God in Worship, "Psalm 23" (with Trevor Morgan) [Provident/Sony BMG, 2009]
