= Lizzy Long =

American singer-songwriter

- Born: Elizabeth Long; January 19, 1984 (age 42); Lincolnton, Georgia, US
- Genres: Contemporary bluegrass/americana/folk, country
- Occupation: Singer
- Instruments: Vocals, fiddle, banjo, guitar, piano, autoharp, bass
- Website: www.littleroyandlizzy.com

Elizabeth Long is an American bluegrass and country music singer. She usually performs alongside Little Roy Lewis from The Lewis Family. Long was born in Lincolnton, Georgia, on the same road as Roy Lewis. From a very early age, Long learned to play various instruments like the fiddle, guitar, and the banjo. Lewis and his wife, Bonnie, became her foster parents since she was fifteen years old.

Lewis started taking Long on his tours, and she eventually began to play with him. Long went to college at the Glenville State College of West Virginia where she was part of the College Bluegrass Music Certificate Scholarship Program led by veteran musician Buddy Griffin. After college, Long moved to Nashville, Tennessee and started performing solo. She was mentored by Earl Scruggs, Buddy Spicher, and Mac Wiseman.

Through her career, Long has been nominated and has won two "bluegrass songs of the year" from the Dove Awards.

Long has performed with many artist such as Earl Scruggs, Mac Wiseman, Buddy Spicher, Rhonda Vincent, Jim and Jesse, Ralph Stanley, The Lewis Family, Ty Herndon, Patty Loveless, and many others.

== Awards and nominations ==
- IBMA Recorded Event of the Year
- 11-time DOVE award winner
- Grammy nominated
