= Life Is a Church =

Life is a Church

Studio album by David Phelps
- Released: September 13, 2005
- Genre: Gospel music, CCM
- Label: Word
- Producer: Greg Bieck

David Phelps chronology
Revelation (2004)	Life is a Church (2005)	Legacy of Love: David Phelps Live! (2006)

Life is a Church is a studio album from Christian singer David Phelps. It was released on September 13, 2005, by Word Records.

== Track listing ==
1. "With His Love (Sing Holy)" (John Bryant Cox) - 3:44
2. "Something's Gotta Change" (Greg Bieck, Tyler Hayes-Bieck, David Phelps) - 3:37
3. "Life Is a Church" (Marcus Hummon) - 4:56
4. "That's What Love Is" (Bieck, Hayes-Bieck, Phelps) - 5:19
5. "Behold the Lamb" (Dottie Rambo) - 5:04
6. "Long Time Coming" (Bieck, Jason Houser, Matthew West) - 3:43
7. "Gentle Savior" (Bieck, Kyle Matthews, Phelps) - 4:40
8. "Visions of God" (Phelps) - 4:38
9. "Power" (Bieck, Matthews, Phelps) - 3:19
10. "The Name Lives On" (Matthews, Phelps) - 4:25
11. "Legacy of Love" (Cindy Morgan, Phelps) - 3:53

== Personnel ==
- David Phelps – vocals
- Greg Bieck – acoustic piano, keyboards, synthesizers, programming, arrangements, string arrangements
- T-Bone Wolk – accordion, guitars, bass
- Rob Hawkins – guitars
- David May – guitars
- Will Owsley – guitars
- Mike Payne – guitars
- Mark Hill – bass
- Dan Needham – drums
- Ken Lewis – drums, percussion
- Ben Phillips – drums
- John Catchings – cello, string arrangements
- David Davidson – viola, violin, string arrangements
- Luke Brown – backing vocals
- Nirva Dorsaint – backing vocals
- Brandon Fraley – backing vocals
- Sherri Proctor – backing vocals
- Chance Scoggins – backing vocals
- Michelle Swift – backing vocals

=== Production ===
- Tim Marshall – executive producer
- Otto Price – executive producer
- Greg Bieck – producer, engineer
- Steve Bishir – engineer
- Bill Whittington – engineer, Pro Tools
- Aaron Sternke – assistant engineer
- Danny Duncan – drum engineer
- David Leonard – mixing
- Marcelo Pennell – mixing
- Lee Bridges – mix assistant
- Josh Baldwin – digital editing
- Andrew Mendelson – mastering at Georgetown Masters (Nashville, Tennessee)
- Cheryl H. McTyre – A&R production
- Blair Berle – creative director
- Katherine Petillo – art direction
- Jay Smith – art direction, design
- Ben Pearson – photography
- Kim Perrett – wardrobe
- Lori Turk – grooming

== Awards ==
The album was nominated for a Dove Award for Inspirational Album of the Year at the 37th GMA Dove Awards.

== Chart performance ==
The album peaked at #11 on Billboard's Christian Albums and #9 on Heatseekers.
