= David Phelps (musician) =

American singer (born 1969)

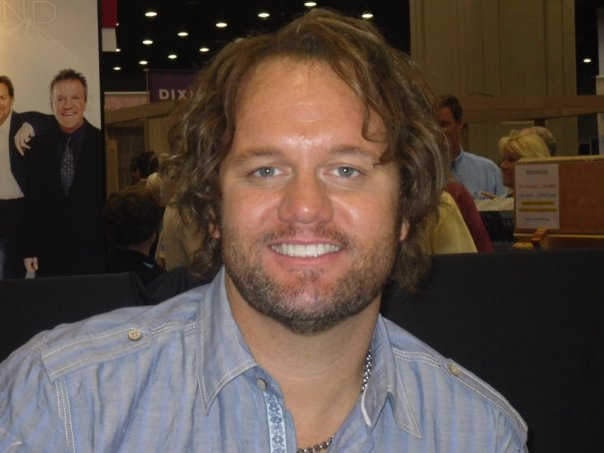
- September 2009

Background information
- Born: David Norris Phelps; October 21, 1969 (age 57); Texas, U.S.
- Genres: Southern gospel, Christian
- Occupations: Musician; singer; songwriter; producer
- Instruments: Vocals, piano
- Years active: 1994–present
- Labels: Springhill, Word
- Formerly of: Gaither Vocal Band
- Website: www.davidphelps.com

David Norris Phelps (born October 21, 1969) is an American Christian music vocalist, songwriter, vocal arranger, and producer who is best known for singing tenor in the Gaither Vocal Band and for his solo career. He has also released several solo albums, including four Christmas collections. On January 13, 2008, Phelps appeared on Extreme Makeover Home Edition for the Woodhouse family.

== Biography ==
David Phelps was born in Tomball, Texas, to Gene and Mary Ella Phelps. Gene is a former accountant/banker who currently teaches business and finance at a college in Houston. Mary Ella is a retired English Professor. He has two older sisters, Sherri Proctor and Kari Lee. Sherri sang backup vocals for him on tour, before dying from cancer in September 2012,) while Kari is a professional trumpeter who tours with the Chicago-based Millar Brass Ensemble.

Phelps grew up in Tomball and graduated from Tomball High School in 1988. He attended Baylor University, where he directed the Baylor Religious Hour Choir and studied with vocal coach Joyce Farwell. He graduated in 1992 with a degree in music and vocal performance.

Phelps was part of the Gaither Vocal Band from 1997 to 2005 and again from 2009 to 2017. He shared the tenor part with Wes Hampton from 2009 to 2017. In early 2017, he left the group to focus on his solo career. He was replaced by Reggie Smith. Phelps has won twelve Dove Awards (with the Gaither Vocal Band), is a four-time Grammy Award nominee and has had several platinum-selling projects. His recent album Classic has aired on PBS. In 2019, Phelps' song "Catching Santa" from his 2018 album It Must Be Christmas was featured in an advertisement for Google's Pixel smartphone.

Phelps has appeared in two stage musical productions. He portrayed the dual role of Adam and Noah in concert versions of Children of Eden. The first was at Cadillac Palace Theatre in 2022 and the second at Lincoln Center’s David Geffen Hall in 2024.

== Personal life ==
David's wife is Lori Purtle Phelps (also born on October 21, 1969). They have four children: Callie, Maggie Beth, David Grant and Coby. Callie, Maggie and Grant can be seen on the Gaither Homecoming videos Christmas in the Country and A Time for Joy. The whole family is featured on the video, The Best of David Phelps from the Homecoming Series. All four children sing on the Classic video, as well.

== Discography ==
=== Solo albums ===
Year	Album	Peak chart position	Record label	Record producer
1994	Journey to Grace			
2000	Joy, Joy		Spring Hill	Matt Huesmann, David Phelps
2001	David Phelps		Spring Hill	Phil Naish
2004	Revelation	7	Word	Regie Hamm, Christopher D. Harris
2005	Life is a Church	9	Word	Greg Bieck
2006	Legacy of Love: David Phelps Live!	28	Word	Phelps, Jim Chaffee
2007	No More Night: Live in Birmingham		Word	Phelps
2007	One Wintry Night	23	Word	Monroe Jones, Phelps
2008	The Voice	15	Word	Monroe Jones
2008	O Holy Night [LIVE]	4	Word	Phelps, Jim Chaffee, Jimmy Abegg, Ben Pearson
2010	Christmas With David Phelps [LIVE]		Spring House	Phelps
2010	Family Band			Phelps
2012	Classic	2	Spring House	Phelps, Bill Gaither
2015	Freedom	1	Gaither Music Group	Phelps, Bill Gaither
2017	Hymnal	1	Gaither Music Group	Phelps, Bill Gaither
2018	It Must Be Christmas		Spring House	Phelps, Bill Gaither
2021	GameChanger		Stowtown Records	Phelps, Grayson Proctor
2024	Speak of Love		SoulSong Records Group	

=== Singles ===
- 2007: "The Power of the Dream"
- 2008: "There Is a Fountain"
- 2016: "Water" (live)
- 2017: "Santa Claus, Get Well Soon" (studio)
- 2020: "Last Night on Earth"
- 2025: "Do You Hear What I Hear?"

=== Compilations ===
- 2009: The Best of David Phelps (Word)
- 2010: Top 10 (Word)
- 2015: David Phelps: The Ultimate Collection

=== With the Gaither Vocal Band ===
- 1998: Still the Greatest Story Ever Told
- 1999: God Is Good
- 2001: I Do Believe
- 2002: Everything Good
- 2003: A Capella
- 2004: Best of the Gaither Vocal Band
- 2009: Reunion Vol. 1 & 2 (live)
- 2009: Reunited
- 2010: Better Day (live)
- 2010: Greatly Blessed
- 2011: I Am a Promise
- 2012: Pure and Simple
- 2014: Hymns
- 2014: The New Edition
- 2014: Sometimes It Takes a Mountain
- 2015: Happy Rhythm
- 2015: Christmas Collection
- 2016: Better Together
- 2019: Reunion live
- 2020: Reunited live

=== Appearances on other albums ===
- 1998: In My Life Larry Gatlin (Spring House) (background)
- 1999: Within Old Pages Walt Mills (Homeland Records) (background)
- 2000: Lordsong Lordsong (Daywind); "Trial of the Heart" (background)
- 2000: Homecoming Praise – Volume 2; "Rock of Ages, Cleft For Me", "Yes, I Know!" (solo)
- 2001: Lauren Talley Lauren Talley (Horizon); "The Prayer" (duet)
- 2001: Mark Lowry On Broadway (Spring Hill); "A Whole New World" (duet with Sandi Patty)
- 2001: Pursuing His Presence The God Chasers (Spring Hill); "Completely Yours" (solo)
- 2002: Homecoming Lullabies Gaither Gospel Series; "I Spy" (solo)
- 2006: The Nativity Story: Sacred Songs Various (Watertower Music); "The Virgin's Lullaby" (Background)
- 2007: Something Beautiful (Disc 2) Gaither Gospel Series; "Dream On" (solo) and "I Walked Today Where Jesus Walks" (Solo)
- 2008: Wait – 10th Anniversary Edition Lana Ranahan; "Then Came The Morning" (duet) and "I've Just Seen Jesus" (duet)
- 2009: Let Go Sheila Walsh (Spring Hill), "The Prayer" (duet)
- 2009: In All I Do Paid in Full; "Because I Love Him" (solo)
- 2010: Love Will Find a Way Steve Green; "God Is Love" (background)
- 2012: Hands of Time Anthony Burger; "What A Savior Medley" (background)
- 2012: Windows in the World Charlotte Ritchie; "After The Last Tear Falls" (background)
- 2012: How You Walk the Miles Karen Peck & New River; "How You Walk the Miles" (background)
- 2013: Some People Change Michael English; "I Wouldn't Take Nothing for My Journey" (background)
- 2014: A Beautiful Life Charlotte Ritchie; "Revelation Song" and "Go Rest High on That Mountain" (background)
- 2014: Out on a Limb Wes Hampton; "Echo of You" (trio/solo), "My Father's House" (background)
- 2016: Let The Glory Come Down Prestonwood Celebration Choir; "Child, You're Forgiven" (solo)
- 2016: 1915: Christmas With Fanny Crosby The Public Square; "Hallelujah Christ Is Here" (solo)
- 2017: The Corner of Broadway & Main Street Voctave; "Being Alive" (solo)
- 2017: Praises from a Grateful Heart Charlotte Ritchie; "Your Great Name" (background)
- 2017: Quanah Larry Gatlin (featured soloist)
- 2018: The Hero - A West End & Friends Tribute West End & Friends; "The Hero" (solo)
- 2019: Your Time Will Come Ensemble Animato (featured soloist)
- 2019: Shine Melissa Brady; "Just Beyond The River Jordan" (duet)
- 2021: The Church Triumphant Artists for the Church; "The Church Triumphant" (solo)
- 2021: I Believe Carly Paoli; "Carly Paoli & Friends" (duet)
- 2025: All Is Well Grace Gonzalez; "All Is Well" (duet)
- 2026: It Is Well Tomb Slayer; "Radiance: A Modern Hymns Project" (solo/duet)

=== YouTube Exclusives ===
- 2020: All I Ask Of You
- 2022: The Star-Spangled Banner (studio version)

=== Vinyl ===
- 2024: Do You Hear What I Hear? (album)

== Video ==
=== Solo ===
- 2006: Legacy of Love [LIVE]
- 2007: No More Night: David Phelps Live in Birmingham
- 2007: O Holy Night
- 2010: Christmas With David Phelps
- 2012: Classic (Gaither Gospel Series)
- 2015: Freedom (Gaither Gospel Series)
- 2018: It Must be Christmas (Gaither Gospel Series)
- 2019: Hymnal (Gaither Gospel Series)
- 2021: Stories & Songs Vol. I
- 2024: Stories & Songs Vol. II
- 2027: Gospel

=== With the Gaither Vocal Band ===
- 1998: Hawaiian Homecoming
- 2002: I Do Believe
- 2003: Australian Homecoming
- 2009: Reunion Volumes 1 & 2
- 2010: Reunited
- 2010: Better Day
- 2012: Pure and Simple Volumes 1 & 2
- 2015: Sometimes It Takes a Mountain
- 2015: Happy Rhythm
- 2019: Reunion live
- 2020: Reunited live

=== Gaither Homecoming Video featured performances ===
- 1998: Kennedy Center Homecoming; "The Battle Hymn of the Republic"
- 1998: All Day Singin' at the Dome; "I'll Fly Away"
- 1998: Atlanta Homecoming; "What a Meeting in the Air", "Jesus Saves"
- 1998: Journey to the Sky; "O Love That Will Not Let Me Go"
- 1998: Passin' the Faith Along; "I Can't Even Walk"
- 1999: Sweet Sweet Spirit; "The Love of God"
- 1999: So Glad; "The Lifeboat"
- 2000: Christmas in the Country; "O Holy Night", "The Christmas Song", "Jingle Bells"
- 2000: Good News; "I'm Free", "What A Meeting in the Air"
- 2000: Irish Homecoming; "This Could Be the Dawning of that Day"
- 2000: Whispering Hope; "The Lifeboat", "When God Dips His Love in My Heart"
- 2000: Harmony in the Heartland; "A House of Gold", "Oh, What a Time"
- 2000: Memphis Homecoming; "Searchin'", "Build an Ark", "God is Good All the Time"
- 2001: A Billy Graham Music Homecoming – Volume 2; "The Love of God", "It is Well with My Soul"
- 2001: Mark Lowry On Broadway; "A Whole New World" (duet with Sandi Patty)
- 2002: Freedom Band; "Worthy the Lamb"
- 2002: I'll Fly Away; "I'll Fly Away", "When I Survey the Wondrous Cross"
- 2002: God Bless America; "End of the Beginning", "The Battle Hymn of the Republic"
- 2003: Heaven; "No More Night", "What a Day That Will Be"
- 2003: Rocky Mountain Homecoming; "These are They"
- 2003: Australian Homecoming; "Let the Glory Come Down"
- 2004: We Will Stand; "When I Survey the Wondrous Cross", "Sweeter As the Days Go By"
- 2005: Jerusalem; "It Is Well with My Soul", "These are They", "Second Fiddle"
- 2007: How Great Thou Art; "There Is a Fountain Filled with Blood"
- 2008: Rock of Ages; "When I Survey the Wondrous Cross"
- 2010: Giving Thanks; "You Are My All in All", "I Will Sing of My Redeemer"
- 2011: The Best of David Phelps from the Homecoming Series
- 2011: Alaskan Homecoming; "America, the Beautiful", "Clean", "These are They"
- 2011: Majesty; "His Eye Is on the Sparrow"
- 2011: Tent Revival Homecoming; "I Stand Amazed," "He's Alive"
- 2017: Sweeter As The Days Go By: "We'll Talk It Over"
- 2026: You Are Loved: "These Are They"
