= Speak to Me (Geoff Moore album) =

Studio album by Geoff Moore
- Released: April 3, 2007
- Studio: Stagg Sound Recorders (Los Angeles, California); Berwick Lane and Chameleon Studios (Nashville, Tennessee)
- Genre: Contemporary Christian music
- Length: 53:30
- Label: Rocketown
- Producer: Geoff Moore; Dwayne Larring

Geoff Moore chronology
Every Single One: Part II (2005)	Speak to Me (2007)

Professional ratings
Review scores
Source	Rating
AllMusic	4/5 stars
Jesus Freak Hideout	4/5 stars

Speak to Me is a studio album released by Christian singer and songwriter Geoff Moore. The album was released by Rocketown Records on April 3, 2007.

== Track listing ==
1. "Speak to Me" (Jim Cooper, Phillip LaRue) – 4:09
2. "Your Day" (Joel Hanson, Moore) – 3:48
3. "When I Get Where I'm Going" (Rivers Rutherford, George Teren) – 4:43
4. "Captured" (Hanson) – 4:04
5. "Every Single One" (Ben Glover, Moore) – 4:24
6. "He Knows My Name" (Tommy Walker) – 4:55
7. "That's What Love Will Do" (Glover, Moore) – 4:05
8. "This Is My Father's World" (Maltbie D. Babcock) – 4:41
9. "So Long, Farewell (The Blessing)" (Moore, Dana Weaver) – 4:17
10. "Erase" (Sam Mizell, Moore) / "Every Single One" (full band version; hidden track) – 10:19

== Personnel ==
- Geoff Moore – vocals, backing vocals (2, 4, 5, 7, 8, 10.2)
- Ryan Tallent – keyboards (1, 3, 6, 9, 10), programming (1, 3, 6, 9, 10), bass (1, 3, 6, 9, 10), backing vocals (1, 3, 6, 9, 10)
- Ian Fitchuk – keyboards (2, 4, 5, 7, 8, 10.2)
- Blair Masters – keyboards (2, 4, 5, 7, 8, 10.2)
- Dwayne Larring – acoustic guitar (1, 3, 6, 9, 10), electric guitars (1, 3, 6, 9, 10), backing vocals (1, 3, 6, 9, 10)
- Dana Weaver – acoustic guitar (1, 3, 6, 9, 10), guitars (2, 4, 5, 7, 8, 10.2), backing vocals (2, 4, 5, 7, 8, 10, 10.2)
- Adam Lester – guitars (2, 4, 5, 7, 8, 10.2), backing vocals (2, 4, 5, 7, 8, 10.2)
- Chris Wiegel – bass (2, 4, 5, 7, 8, 10.2)
- Aaron Sterling – drums (1, 3, 6, 9, 10), percussion (1, 3, 6, 9, 10)
- David Larring – additional drums (1), additional programming (1)
- Paul Eckberg – drums (2, 4, 5, 7, 8, 10.2)
- Bruce Wethy – fiddle (2, 4, 5, 7, 8, 10.2)
- Kevin Perry – backing vocals (2, 4, 5, 7, 8, 10.2)
- Christy Nockels – vocals (3), backing vocals (3)
- Nathan Nockels – additional backing vocals (3)
- Kendall Payne – vocals (6), backing vocals (6)

== Production ==
- Don Donohue – executive producer
- Geoff Moore – executive producer, producer (2, 4, 5, 7, 8, 10.2)
- John Andrade – A&R (1, 3, 6, 9, 10), art production
- Steve Strout – A&R (1, 3, 6, 9, 10)
- Dwayne Larring – producer (1, 3, 6, 9, 10)
- Ryan Tallent – co- producer (10)
- Sean Hall – project assistant (1, 3, 6, 9, 10)
- Micah Kandros – photography, album packaging, art design
- David Lipscomb for Overflow, Inc. – management

Technical credits

- Dan Shike – mastering at Tone and Volume Mastering (Nashville, Tennessee)
- Dwayne Larring – engineer (1, 3, 6, 9, 10), mixing (10)
- David Larring – mixing (1, 3, 6, 9)
- Kevin Perry – recording (2, 4, 5, 7, 8, 10.2), mixing (2, 4, 5, 7, 8, 10.2)
- Ryan Tallent – additional engineer (1, 3, 6, 9, 10)
- Nathan Nockels – additional vocal recording (1), vocal recording (3)

== Awards ==
The album was nominated for a Dove Award for Inspirational Album of the Year at the 39th GMA Dove Awards.

== Chart performance ==
The song "When I Get Where I'm Going" peaked at No. 14 on Billboard's Christian Songs chart.
