= Calvin Hunt (singer) =

Background information
- Born: July 1, 1957; Queens, New York City, US
- Origin: Queens, New York City
- Died: December 26, 2009 (aged 52)
- Genres: Contemporary Christian, gospel
- Occupation(s): Singer, songwriter
- Instrument: Guitar
- Formerly of: Christ Tabernacle Choir; Brooklyn Tabernacle Singers

Calvin Hunt (July 1, 1957 – December 26, 2009) was an American Christian singer.

== Background ==
When Hunt's group fell through he continued writing and singing for friends and family, doing block parties, etc. Hunt later became addicted to crack cocaine. Eventually, with the prayer of his wife and children and his Church, The Brooklyn Tabernacle, Hunt rehabilitated and became a full-time minister. Hunt sang with the Brooklyn Tabernacle Choir and the Brooklyn Tabernacle Singers, with whom he won a Grammy and a Dove Award.

Hunt Recorded 4 of 5 Albums 1 unreleased. Released Albums years 1998 – 2007.

Hunt was also diagnosed with lung cancer but he continued to perform. His 2008 album, Bridges, was nominated for a Dove Award for Contemporary Gospel Album of the Year, with the song "Come On" being nominated for Contemporary Gospel Recorded Song of the Year.

Hunt had been battling cancer and died from cardiac arrest on December 26, 2009, in Jamaica Hospital in Queens, New York.

== Discography ==
Calvin Hunt Story :When You Just Can't Stop

- Not I But Christ (1998)
- Mercy Saw Me (2001)
- Power in the Name of the Lord (2001)
- Bridges (2007)
