= Glee: The Music, Volume 2 =

Soundtrack album by Glee Cast
- Released: December 4, 2009
- Recorded: 2009
- Length: 58:19
- Label: Columbia / 20th Century Fox TV
- Producers: Dante Di Loreto (exec.), Brad Falchuk (exec.), Adam Anders, Peer Åström, Ryan Murphy

Glee Cast chronology
Glee: The Music, Volume 1 (2009)	Glee: The Music, Volume 2 (2009)	Glee: The Music, The Power of Madonna (2010)

Glee: The Music, Volume 2 is the second soundtrack album by the cast of the American musical television series Glee, featuring songs from episodes nine to thirteen of the show's first season. It was first released on December 4, 2009 in Australia by Columbia Records. It has been certified platinum in Canada and Australia, and gold in the United Kingdom and the United States. Volume 2 received mixed reviews from critics, who praised the vocals of cast members Lea Michele, Amber Riley, and Kevin McHale, but felt the album was weak in arrangements and similar to a collection of karaoke tracks. All tracks were released as singles and performed on the series, with the exception of "Don't Make Me Over"—only an instrumental version was used.

== Production and songs ==
Each of songs included on the album were released as singles, available for download. "True Colors" charted highest in all regions except America, reaching number 15 in Ireland, number 35 in the United Kingdom, number 38 in Canada, and number 47 in Australia. In America, the best-performing single was "Lean on Me", which charted at number 50. The only songs which failed to chart in any region were "(You're) Having My Baby" and "Don't Make Me Over". Karaoke versions of "Lean on Me", "My Life Would Suck Without You" and "True Colors" were also released, based on fan–demand and the popularity of karaoke tribute videos to the series.

Yoko Ono was hesitant about allowing Glee the rights to "Imagine". Series music supervisor P.J. Bloom explained: "It was very difficult to convince Yoko Ono that it was the right thing to do. She needed to truly understand how the music was going to be used. The added component of us wanting to have a deaf choir signing the song made for this incredibly poignant moment. ...It really took a lot of convincing to get her on board and realize that it was a great, great moment, and a tribute to John and his song." While a full version of "Don't Make Me Over" is included on the album, only an instrumental version was used in the show.

== Reception ==
Professional ratings
Review scores
Source	Rating
Allmusic	3/5 stars
Entertainment Weekly	(A−)
IGN	7.3/10

The album has received mixed reviews from critics. Whitney Pastorek of Entertainment Weekly felt that there was much about the album that should not work, including "sickly-sweet vocals", "theme-park-level arrangements" and "cheesy song choices". Despite this, she commented: "When the Glee kids nail something—like a version of Van Halen's "Jump" that made my cheeks sore from smiling—the title of this joyful franchise could not be more apt." Allmusic's Andrew Leahey observed that the soundtrack felt "a bit rushed" due to its release four weeks after Volume 1 and the fact it features songs from half as many episodes as the first album. He criticized: "As before, this album sometimes strays away from choral arrangements and sounds more like a collection of karaoke recordings." Overall, however, Leahey believed that returning fans would find the album enjoyable.

Christopher John Farley of The Wall Street Journal commented that Michele, Riley and McHale have "the most distinctive voices" of all the Glee cast members, suggesting that Michele's rendition of "Don't Rain on My Parade" would "have some listeners hoping she'll be sharing her talents with Broadway again soon." IGN's Brian Linder recommended the album to Glee fans only, opining that "only two or three tracks will be of interest to the non-hardcore fan. Unlike the first installment in the show's soundtrack series, Glee – The Music, Vol. 2 isn't going to win over any skeptics."

== Track listing ==
Unless otherwise indicated, Information is taken from the album's Liner Notes

No.	Title	Writer(s)	Original artist(s)	Length
1.	"Proud Mary" (featuring Amber Riley, Kevin McHale, Jenna Ushkowitz and Lea Michele)	John Fogerty	Creedence Clearwater Revival	3:43
2.	"Endless Love" (featuring Matthew Morrison and Lea Michele)	Lionel Richie	Diana Ross and Lionel Richie	4:25
3.	"I'll Stand by You" (featuring Cory Monteith)	Chrissie Hynde, Tom Kelly, Billy Steinberg	The Pretenders	3:51
4.	"Don't Stand So Close to Me / Young Girl" (featuring Matthew Morrison)	Sting / Jerry Fuller	The Police / Gary Puckett & The Union Gap	2:28
5.	"Crush" (featuring Lea Michele)	Andy Goldmark, Mark Mueller, Berny Cosgrove, Kevin Clark	Jennifer Paige	3:23
6.	"(You're) Having My Baby" (featuring Cory Monteith)	Paul Anka	Paul Anka and Odia Coates	2:47
7.	"Lean on Me" (featuring Kevin McHale and Amber Riley)	Bill Withers	Bill Withers	4:17
8.	"Don't Make Me Over" (featuring Amber Riley)	Burt Bacharach, Hal David	Dionne Warwick	3:25
9.	"Imagine" (featuring Amber Riley, Kevin McHale, Lea Michele and Cory Monteith)	John Lennon	John Lennon	2:23
10.	"True Colors" (featuring Jenna Ushkowitz)	Tom Kelly, Billy Steinberg	Cyndi Lauper	3:34
11.	"Jump" (featuring Cory Monteith, Lea Michele, Kevin McHale and Amber Riley)	Alex Van Halen, David Lee Roth, Eddie Van Halen, Michael Anthony	Van Halen	3:57
12.	"Smile (Lily Allen song)" (featuring Lea Michele and Cory Monteith)	Lily Allen, Iyiola Babalola, Darren Lewis, Donat Mittoo	Lily Allen	3:14
13.	"Smile (Charlie Chaplin song)" (featuring Lea Michele, Cory Monteith and Amber Riley)	Charlie Chaplin, John Turner, Geoffrey Parsons	Charlie Chaplin (instrumental); Nat King Cole (vocal)	3:01
14.	"And I Am Telling You I'm Not Going" (featuring Amber Riley)	Tom Eyen, Henry Krieger	Jennifer Holliday in the musical Dreamgirls	4:06
15.	"Don't Rain on My Parade" (featuring Lea Michele)	Jule Styne, Bob Merrill	Barbra Streisand in the musical Funny Girl	2:47
16.	"You Can't Always Get What You Want" (featuring Cory Monteith, Amber Riley, Lea Michele and Kevin McHale)	Mick Jagger, Keith Richards	The Rolling Stones	3:27
17.	"My Life Would Suck Without You" (featuring Lea Michele, Cory Monteith, Jenna Ushkowitz and Amber Riley)	Max Martin, Lukasz Gottwald, Claude Kelly, Kelly Clarkson	Kelly Clarkson	3:31

Japanese bonus tracks
No.	Title	Writer(s)	Original artist(s)	Length
18.	"Hello, I Love You"	Jim Morrison	The Doors	2:20
19.	"The Boy Is Mine"	LaShawn Daniels, Rodney Jerkins, Fred Jerkins III, Japhe Tejeda, Brandy Norwood, Monica Arnold	Brandy & Monica	4:54

Notes

- Lily Allen's "Smile" contains replayed elements of "Free Soul" written by Donat "Jackie" Mittoo and Clement Dodd.
- While Dianna Agron, Chris Colfer, Jayma Mays and Mark Salling are listed in the "Glee Cast Vocals" section of the album's Liner notes, their vocals do not appear on any of the album's songs. While Naya Rivera is not credited in the notes, her vocals appear on the Japanese bonus track "The Boy Is Mine".

== Personnel ==
- Dianna Agron – vocals
- Lily Allen – composer
- Adam Anders – engineer, producer, additional vocals
- Paul Anka – composer
- Peer Åström – engineer, mixing, producer
- Iyiola Babalola – composer
- David Baloche – additional vocals
- Dave Betts – art direction, design
- PJ Bloom – supervisor
- Geoff Bywater – executive in charge of music
- Charlie Chaplin – composer
- Kevin Clark – composer
- Chris Colfer – vocals
- Kamari Copeland – additional vocals
- Hal David – composer
- Tim Davis – additional vocals
- Dante Di Loreto – executive producer
- Tom Eyen – composer
- Brad Falchuk – executive producer
- John Fogerty – composer
- Jerry Fuller – composer
- Emily Gomez – additional vocals
- Heather Guibert – coordination
- Nikki Hassman – additional vocals
- Chrissie Hynde – composer
- Mick Jagger – composer
- Jeannette Kaczorowski – cover design
- Jenny Karr – additional vocals
- Tom Kelly – composer
- Robin Koehler – coordination
- Henry Krieger – composer
- Kerri Larson – additional vocals
- John Lennon – composer
- David Loucks – additional vocals
- Meaghan Lyons – coordination
- Chris Mann – additional vocals
- Max Martin – composer
- Maria Paula Marulanda – art direction, design
- Jayma Mays – vocals
- Kevin McHale – lead vocals
- Lea Michele – lead vocals
- Cory Monteith – lead vocals
- Matthew Morrison – lead vocals
- Mark Mueller – composer
- Ryan Murphy – producer
- Tiffany Palmer – additional vocals
- Geoffrey Parsons – composer
- Ryan Peterson – engineer
- Keith Richards – composer
- Lionel Richie – composer
- Amber Riley – lead vocals
- Mark Salling – vocals
- Sting – composer
- Jule Styne – composer
- Louie Teran – mastering
- Jenna Ushkowitz – lead vocals
- Alex Van Halen – composer
- Eddie Van Halen – composer
- Windy Wagner – additional vocals
- Bill Withers – composer

Source: allmusic.

== Charts and certifications ==
=== Weekly charts ===
Chart (2009)	Peak position
Australian Albums (ARIA)	8
Canadian Albums (Billboard)	5
US Billboard 200	3
US Soundtrack Albums (Billboard)	1

Chart (2010)	Peak position
Belgian Albums (Ultratop Wallonia)	44
Dutch Albums (Album Top 100)	16
Irish Albums (IRMA)	1
Mexican Albums Chart	39
New Zealand Albums (RMNZ)	1
UK Albums (Official Charts)	2

Chart (2011)	Peak position
Belgian Albums (Ultratop Flanders)	77
French Albums (SNEP)	74
Italian Compilations Chart	20

=== Year-end charts ===
Chart (2009)	Position
Australian Albums (ARIA)	71

Chart (2010)	Position
Australian Albums (ARIA)	41
Canadian Albums (Billboard)	29
New Zealand Albums (RMNZ)	29
UK Albums (OCC)	47
US Billboard 200	26
US Soundtrack Albums (Billboard)	3

Chart (2011)	Position
US Soundtrack Albums (Billboard)	18

=== Certifications ===
Country	Certification
Australia	Platinum
Canada	Platinum
Ireland	2× Platinum
New Zealand	Gold
United Kingdom	Gold
United States	Gold

== Release history ==
Region	Release date
Australia	December 4, 2009
Canada	December 8, 2009
United States	December 8, 2009
Japan	December 15, 2009
New Zealand	January 11, 2010
Mexico	March 2010
Ireland	March 12, 2010
United Kingdom	March 15, 2010
Taiwan	April 20, 2010
Italy	January 26, 2011
