= Jeff & Sheri Easter =

- Born: March 18, 1960 (age 66) (Jeff); October 27, 1963 (age 63) (Sheri)
- Origin: North Carolina, presently Georgia
- Genre: Southern gospel
- Occupation: Singers
- Instruments: Vocals, harmonica
- Years active: 1994–present
- Website: www.jeffandsherieaster.com https://www.facebook.com/JeffAndSheriEaster

Jeff & Sheri Easter are a Southern gospel group led by the husband and wife duo of the same name.

== Career ==
Jeff Easter and Sheri Williamson met in August 1984 during the Albert E. Brumley Sundown to Sunup Gospel Sing in Arkansas. At the time, Jeff was the bassist for the Singing Americans, while Sheri was performing with The Lewis Family. After being introduced, they married ten months later, June 1985. After that, Jeff and Sheri traveled and performed as part of The Lewis Family, until they decided to pursue a career alone in 1988. Since that, they have released several albums and have been nominated for various awards. Joining them on stage are their children: Madison (guitars) and Morgan (vocals). They have another daughter named Maura, who also occasionally joins them on stage in various roles. Madison's wife, Shannon Easter, and Morgan's husband, Landan Smith, are also members of the band. Jeff Easter is son of James Easter, known as member of The Easter Brothers (brothers Ed, James and Russell, from Mount Airy, North Carolina), and brother of steel guitarist Steve "Rabbit" Easter. Jeff & Sheri Easter have been frequent performers on the Gaither Homecoming videos and recordings.

== Discography ==
- 1994: Thread of Hope
- 1995: By Request
- 1995: Silent Witness
- 1995: Ever Faithful To You (Love Songs: A 10 Year Celebration)
- 1996: Places In Time
- 1998: A Work In Progress
- 1999: Sittin’ On Cloud Nine
- 2000: Ordinary Day
- 2001: It Feels Like Christmas Again
- 2002: My Oh My
- 2003: Forever And A Day
- 2004: Sunshine
- 2005: Miles And Milestones
- 2007: Life Is Great and Gettin' Better
- 2008: Mayberry Live
- 2009: We Are Family
- 2010: Expecting Good Things
- 2010: Live at Oak Tree
- 2011: Silver Anniversary
- 2012: Eyes Wide Open
- 2014: Yesterday... A Decade Of Favorties
- 2015: Small Town
- 2017: Sing It Again
- 2019: You Are Loved
- 2023: Treasure
- 2023: Christmas Is

== Accolades ==
Jeff & Sheri Easter have won several awards through their career. Among them:

- 5 Dove Awards
- 2 Grammy Award nominations
- 2 International Country Gospel Music Association Awards
