= The Lewis Family =

American bluegrass musicians

- Origin: Lincolnton, Georgia
- Genres: Bluegrass, Gospel
- Years active: 1951-2009

The Lewis Family is a family of gospel and bluegrass musicians from Lincolnton, Georgia. They are known as the "First Family of Bluegrass Gospel".

== Background ==
The family was founded by Pop and Mom Lewis (Roy Lewis Sr. and Pauline Lewis, née Holloway), who married in 1925. In 1951 they chose the name The Lewis Family when singing at a Woodmen of the World meeting. Later that year, they did their first recording sessions, released on Sullivan Records.

== Career ==
In 1954, they were offered a slot performing weekly on a television show in Augusta, Georgia, where they would appear until 1992. They began recording for Starday Records in 1957 and continued recording prolifically for Canaan, Riversong, Daywind, and others; they have released nearly 60 albums.

The Lewis Family started touring regularly in the 1960s, continuing into the 2000s; several generations of family members have entered the group as time passed. They also held an annual festival in their hometown, the Lewis Family Homecoming & Bluegrass Festival.

The Lewis Family joined producers Randall Franks and Alan Autry for the In the Heat of the Night (TV Series) cast CD "Christmas Time's A Comin'" performing "Christmas Time's A Comin'" with the cast on the CD released on Sonlite and MGM/UA for one of the most popular Christmas releases of 1991 and 1992 with Southern retailers. Group members Travis Lewis and Lewis Phillips also assisted the cast with the song "Jingle Bells." Franks, also a bluegrass fiddler, made numerous appearances through the years with the family in concert.

Due to the declining health of several members, the Lewis Family announced its retirement in May 2009; they performed their final regular concert on September 5, 2009, in Dover, Pennsylvania. On November 7, 2009, the family returned home to Lincolnton to perform a farewell concert.

The Lewis Family's original home, built by Pop, is currently being restored by Jeff and Sheri Easter. Sheri is the daughter of Polly Lewis Copsey.

In 2011, The Lewis Family played and sang at A Dukes Of Hazzard Festival in Sperryville, Virginia.

== Recognition ==
The group was inducted into the Georgia Music Hall of Fame in 1992 and the International Bluegrass Music Hall of Honor in 2006. They have also won a number of Dove Awards.
