= Jayma Mays =

American actress (born 1979)

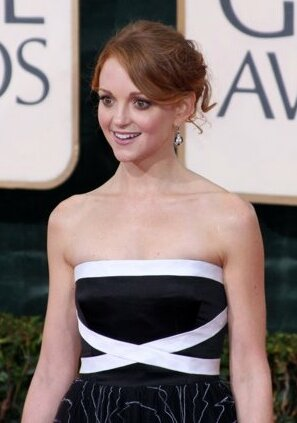
- Mays in 2010
- Born: Jamia Suzette Mays; July 16, 1979 (age 47); Bristol, Tennessee, U.S.
- Education: Southwest Virginia Community College (AA); Radford University (BA)
- Occupation: Actress
- Years active: 2004–present
- Spouse: Adam Campbell (m. 2007)
- Children: 1

Jamia Suzette "Jayma" Mays (born July 16, 1979) is an American actress. She is known for playing Emma Pillsbury in the Fox musical series Glee (2009–2015) and for her starring roles in the films Red Eye (2005), Paul Blart: Mall Cop (2009) and The Smurfs (2011). She is also known for portraying Debbie in the sitcom The Millers (2013–2014) and her recurring role as Charlie Andrews on the NBC sci-fi series Heroes (2006–2010). Mays starred as prosecutor Carol Anne Keane in the NBC sitcom Trial & Error (2017–2018).

== Early life and education ==
Mays was raised in Grundy, Virginia, the daughter of Susan Paulette (née Norris) and James Edwin Mays, a high school teacher who also worked in the coal mining industry. At age 15, she was offered a job working on the local radio station reading the obituaries. After graduating from Grundy High School, she earned an associate degree from Southwest Virginia Community College. Mays then attended Virginia Tech for a year before transferring to Radford University.

== Career ==
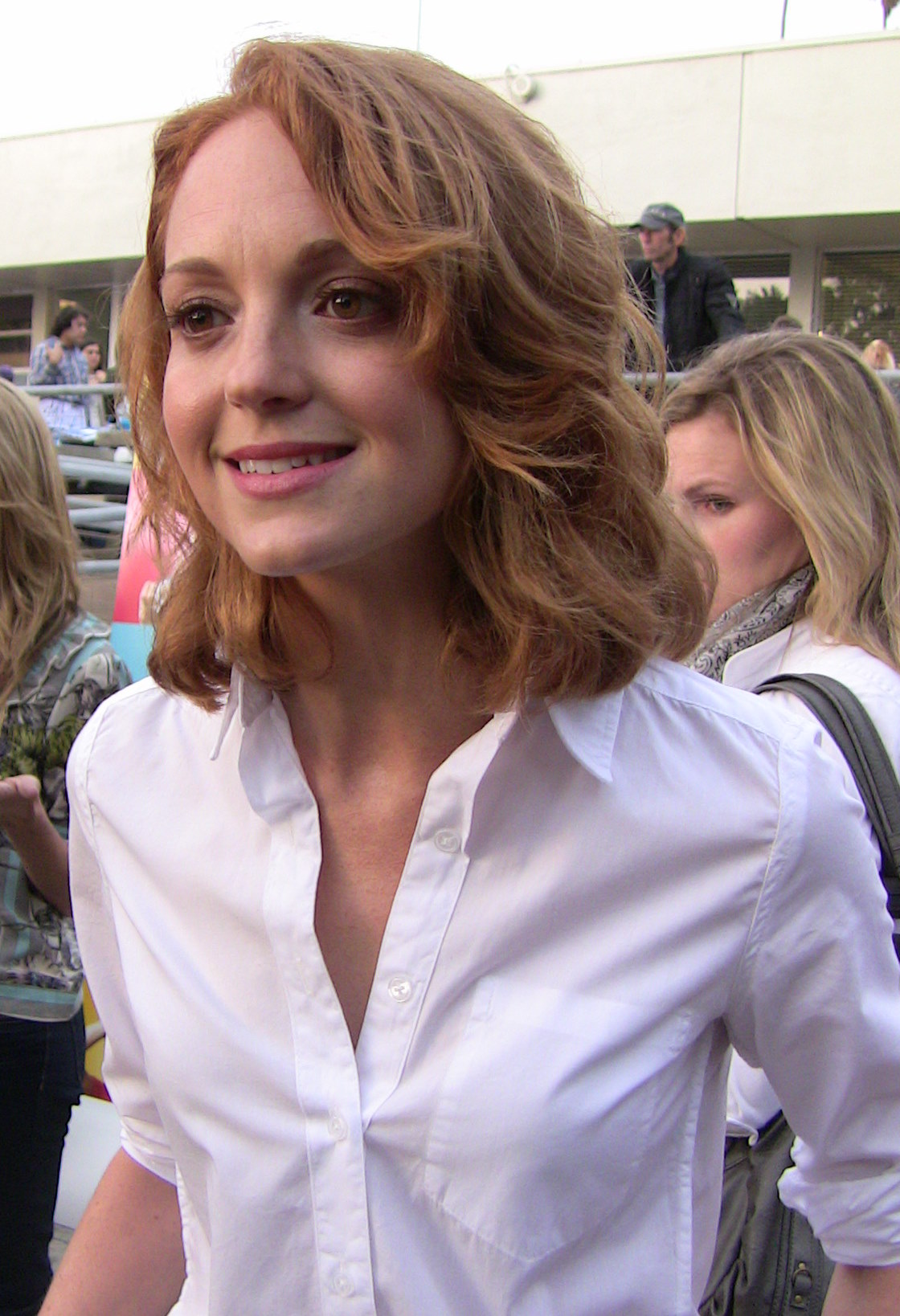
Mays in 2009

In 2004, Mays made her first television appearance on Joey. The following year, she made her feature film debut with a supporting role in Red Eye. Mays' other credits include Six Feet Under, Stacked, How I Met Your Mother, Heroes, Pushing Daisies, The Comeback, Entourage, Ghost Whisperer, and Ugly Betty.

Mays appeared in other movies, such as Bar Starz, Flags of Our Fathers and Blind Guy Driving. She starred in the spoof film Epic Movie and as Amy in Paul Blart: Mall Cop. She was a patient on House in the episode "Sleeping Dogs Lie" in 2006. Mays has played the love interest of a character played by Masi Oka in two different roles: Charlie Andrews on Heroes and Nina in the direct-to-DVD film Get Smart's Bruce and Lloyd: Out of Control. She has also been cast as a love interest twice for Glee co-star Matthew Morrison; in an unaired TV show called Nice Girls Don't Get the Corner Office, and as mysophobic guidance counsellor Emma Pillsbury on the Fox show Glee, which premiered on May 19, 2009. She was part of the main cast of Glee for the first three seasons, then was made a guest star in seasons four, five, and six. She has also performed musical numbers on Glee including her solo performance of "Touch-a, Touch-a, Touch-a Touch Me" from The Rocky Horror Show during the themed episode "The Rocky Horror Glee Show"; which was also the song she had sung for her audition for the role. In March 2010, Mays played Grace Winslow, the female lead in the live-action/animated film adaptation of The Smurfs. She also played the role of Charlotte, Henry Grubstick's ex-girlfriend on Ugly Betty. In August 2014, Mays helped to raise awareness of the disease ALS by participating in the Ice Bucket Challenge. She also appeared in the music video for Switchfoot's single "Awakening".

From 2017 to 2018, Mays starred in the NBC crime anthology comedy Trial & Error as prosecutor Carol Anne Keane. She also appeared in a 2018 episode of Great News as Cat, the girlfriend of Greg, played by Mays's husband Adam Campbell.

In April 2021, it was announced that Mays was cast in Disenchanted, the long-awaited sequel to the 2007 film Enchanted, along with Maya Rudolph and Yvette Nicole Brown.

== Personal life ==
Mays met her husband Adam Campbell on the set of Epic Movie in 2006. She gave birth to their son on August 21, 2016.

== Filmography ==
=== Film ===
Year	Title	Role	Notes
2005	Red Eye	Cynthia	
2006	Blind Dating	Mandy	
2006	Flags of Our Fathers	Nurse in Hawaii	
2007	Smiley Face	Actress in Waiting Room	
2007	Epic Movie	Lucy Pervertski	
2007	Bar Starz	Tiffany	
2008	Get Smart's Bruce and Lloyd: Out of Control	Nina	
2008	Night Hikers	Skellen	Short film
2009	Paul Blart: Mall Cop	Amy Anderson	
2011	The Smurfs	Grace Winslow	
2013	The Smurfs 2	Grace Winslow	
2013	Bananas	Narrator	Short film
2014	Awkward Expressions of Love	Liz	Short film
2014	Last Weekend	Blake Curtis	
2015	Larry Gaye: Renegade Male Flight Attendant	April Farnekowski	
2015	Paul Blart: Mall Cop 2	Amy Blart-Anderson	Cameo
2017	American Made	Dana Sibota	
2020	Little Willy	Mrs. Caruthers	Short film
2020	Bill & Ted Face the Music	Princess Joanna	
2022	Disenchanted	Ruby	

=== Television ===
Year	Title	Role	Notes
2004	Joey	Molly	Episode: "Joey and the Party"
2005	The Comeback	Sales Girl	Episode: "Valerie Demands Dignity"
2005	Six Feet Under	Donna	Episode: "The Rainbow of Her Reasons"
2005	Stacked	Brenda	Episode: "Nobody Says I Love You"
2005, 2013	How I Met Your Mother	Coat Check Girl	2 episodes
2006	If You Lived Here, You'd Be Home Now	Sandra	Pilot (unaired)
2006	30 Even Scarier Movie Moments	Herself	Miniseries
2006	House	Hannah	Episode: "Sleeping Dogs Lie"
2006	Studio 60 on the Sunset Strip	Daphne	Episode: "Pilot"
2006	Entourage	Jen	Episode: "Sorry, Ari"
2006–2010	Heroes	Charlie Andrews	Recurring role; 5 episodes
2007	Nice Girls Don't Get the Corner Office	Angela	Pilot (unaired)
2007	Ghost Whisperer	Jennifer Billings	Episode: "The Underneath"
2007	Pushing Daisies	Elsita / Elsa	Episode: "Pigeon"
2007–2008	Ugly Betty	Charlie	Recurring role; 8 episodes
2008	Back to You	Shelley Ken	Episode: "Date Night"
2008–2019	Drunk History	Annabelle / Abigail Adams / Marjory Stoneman Douglas / Florence Schaffner	Recurring role; 4 episodes
2009–2015	Glee	Emma Pillsbury	Main role (seasons 1–3); recurring (season 4–6)
2012–2014	The League	Trixie Von Stein	Recurring role; 6 episodes
2013	NTSF:SD:SUV::	Clock	Episode: "The Great Train Stoppery"
2013–2015	The Millers	Debbie	Main role; 34 episodes
2014–2015	Getting On	Suzi Sasso	5 episodes
2015	Resident Advisors	Michaela Roberts	Episode: "Motivational Speaker"
2015	Wet Hot American Summer: First Day of Camp	Jessica	2 episodes
2015	Gigi Does It		Episode: "Love Thyself"
2015–2018	The Adventures of Puss in Boots	Dulcinea	Voice; Main role
2017–2018	Trial & Error	Carol Anne Keane	Main role
2018	Great News	Cat	Episode: "Catfight"
2022	United States of Al	Cindy	6 episodes
2025–2026	Leanne	Mary	10+ episodes
2026	St. Denis Medical	Kelly	Episode: "Here a Righteous Woman Comes"

=== Music videos ===
Year	Title	Artist
2007	"Awakening"	Switchfoot
