= 49th Annual Grammy Awards =

2007 US music awards ceremony

- Date: February 11, 2007
- Location: Staples Center, Los Angeles
- Most awards: Dixie Chicks (5)
- Most nominations: Mary J. Blige (8)
- Website: https://www.grammy.com/awards/49th-annual-grammy-awards

Television/radio coverage
- Network: CBS

The 49th Annual Grammy Awards was a ceremony honoring the best in music for the recording year beginning October 1, 2005, and ending September 30, 2006, in the United States. The awards were handed out on Sunday, February 11, 2007, at the Staples Center in Los Angeles. The Dixie Chicks were the night's biggest winners winning a total of five awards. Mary J. Blige received the most nominations, with eight. Don Henley was honored as MusiCares Person of the Year two nights prior to the show on February 9, 2007. The show won an Emmy for Outstanding Lighting Direction (electronic, multicamera) for VMC Programming.

== Main ceremony ==
Artist(s)	Song(s)
The Police	"Roxanne"
Dixie Chicks	"Not Ready to Make Nice"
Beyoncé	"Listen"
Justin Timberlake	"What Goes Around... Comes Around"
Corinne Bailey Rae; John Legend; John Mayer	"Like A Star" "Coming Home" "Gravity"
Shakira; Wyclef Jean	"Hips Don't Lie"
Gnarls Barkley	"Crazy"
Mary J. Blige	"Be Without You" "Stay With Me"
Carrie Underwood; Rascal Flatts	Tribute to Bob Wills & Don Henley "San Antonio Rose" "Hotel California" "Desperado" "Life In The Fast Lane"
Smokey Robinson; Lionel Richie; Chris Brown	"The Tracks of My Tears" "Hello" "Run It!"
Christina Aguilera	Tribute to James Brown "It's a Man's Man's Man's World"
Ludacris; Mary J. Blige; Earth, Wind & Fire	"Runaway Love"
James Blunt	Tribute to Ahmet Ertegun "You're Beautiful"
Robyn Troup; Justin Timberlake; T.I.	"Ain't No Sunshine" "My Love"
Red Hot Chili Peppers	"Snow (Hey Oh)"

The performance of Roxanne by the Police to open the show promoted the start of their reunion tour.

== Presenters ==
Main ceremony

- Jamie Foxx – presented Best Pop Collaboration with Vocals
- Joan Baez – introduced Dixie Chicks
- Prince – introduced Beyoncé
- The Black Eyed Peas – presented Best R&B Album and presented Booker T and the MG's as the lifetime achievement honorees.
- P!nk & T.I. – presented Best Female R&B Vocal Performance and presented The Doors as Lifetime Achievement honorees.
- Stevie Wonder – introduced Corinne Bailey Rae, John Legend & John Mayer
- Nelly Furtado, Natasha Bedingfield & Nicole Scherzinger – presented Best Pop Vocal Album
- Burt Bacharach & Seal – presented Song of the Year and paid tribute to A&M founders Herb Alpert and Jerry Moss.
- Alyson Hannigan & Cobie Smulders – introduced Gnarls Barkley and presented The Grateful Dead as Lifetime Achievement honorees.
- Common & Kanye West – presented Best Rap Album
- Terrence Howard – introduced Mary J. Blige and presented Maria Callas as Lifetime Achievement honoree.
- Mandy Moore, LeAnn Rimes & Luke Wilson – presented Best Country Album
- Reba McEntire – introduced Carrie Underwood & Rascal Flatts and paid tribute to honorees Bob Wills and Don Henley.
- Natalie Cole & Ornette Coleman – presented Best New Artist
- Samuel L. Jackson & Christina Ricci – talk about the birth of R&B and introduced Lionel Richie, Chris Brown & Smokey Robinson
- Rihanna & David Spade – introduced Ludacris, Mary J. Blige & Earth, Wind & Fire
- Jennifer Hudson – introduced My Grammy Moment Winner Robyn Troup
- Tony Bennett & Quentin Tarantino – presented Record of the Year
- Chris Rock – introduced Red Hot Chili Peppers
- Al Gore & Queen Latifah – presented Best Rock Album
- Don Henley & Scarlett Johansson – presented Album of the Year

== Winners and nominees ==
Multiple nominees and wins (award nominations/wins)

- Mary J. Blige (8/3)
- Dixie Chicks (5/5)
- John Mayer (5/2)
- James Blunt (5/0)
- Red Hot Chili Peppers (4/3)
- Gnarls Barkley (4/2)
- Justin Timberlake (4/2)
- Carrie Underwood (3/2)

Bold type indicates the winner out of the list of nominees.

=== General ===
Record of the Year

- **"Not Ready to Make Nice" – Dixie Chicks**
  - Rick Rubin, producer; Richard Dodd, Jim Scott & Chris Testa, engineers/mixers
- "Be Without You" – Mary J. Blige
  - Bryan-Michael Cox & Ron Fair producers; Danny Cheung, Tal Herzberg, Dave "Hard-Drive" Pensado & Allen Sides, engineers/mixers
- "You're Beautiful" – James Blunt
  - Tom Rothrock, producer; Tom Rothrock & Mike Tarantino, engineers/mixers
- "Crazy" – Gnarls Barkley
  - Danger Mouse, producer; Ben H. Allen, Danger Mouse & Kennie Takahashi, engineers/mixers
- "Put Your Records On" – Corinne Bailey Rae
  - Steve Chrisanthou, producer; Steve Chrisanthou & Jeremy Wheatley, engineers/mixers

Album of the Year

- **Taking the Long Way** – Dixie Chicks
  - Rick Rubin, producer; Richard Dodd, Jim Scott & Chris Testa, engineers/mixers; Richard Dodd, mastering engineer
- St. Elsewhere – Gnarls Barkley
  - Danger Mouse, producer; Ben H. Allen, Danger Mouse & Kennie Takahashi, engineers/mixers; Mike Lazer, mastering engineer
- Continuum – John Mayer
  - Steve Jordan & John Mayer, producers; John Alagía, Michael Brauer, Joe Ferla, Chad Franscoviak, Manny Marroquin & Dave O'Donnell, engineers/mixers; Greg Calbi, mastering engineer
- Stadium Arcadium – Red Hot Chili Peppers
  - Rick Rubin, producer; Ryan Hewitt, Mark Linett & Andrew Scheps, engineers/mixers; Vlado Meller, mastering engineer
- FutureSex/LoveSounds – Justin Timberlake
  - Nate (Danja) Hills, Jawbreakers, Rick Rubin, Timbaland & Justin Timberlake, producers; Jimmy Douglass, Serban Ghenea, Padraic Kerin, Jason Lader, Andrew Scheps, Timbaland & Ethan Willoughby, engineers/mixers; Herb Powers, Jr., mastering engineer

Song of the Year

- "**Not Ready to Make Nice**" – Dixie Chicks
  - Martie Maguire, Natalie Maines, Emily Robison & Dan Wilson, songwriters
- "Be Without You" – Mary J. Blige
  - Johntá Austin, Mary J. Blige, Bryan-Michael Cox & Jason Perry, songwriters
- "Jesus, Take The Wheel" – Carrie Underwood
  - Brett James, Hillary Lindsey & Gordie Sampson, songwriters
- "Put Your Records On" – Corinne Bailey Rae
  - John Beck, Steve Chrisanthou & Corinne Bailey Rae, songwriters
- "You're Beautiful" – James Blunt
  - James Blunt, Amanda Ghost & Sacha Skarbek, songwriters

Best New Artist

- **Carrie Underwood**
- Corinne Bailey Rae
- James Blunt
- Chris Brown
- Imogen Heap

=== Pop ===
Best Female Pop Vocal Performance

- **"Ain't No Other Man" – Christina Aguilera**
- "Unwritten" – Natasha Bedingfield
- "You Can Close Your Eyes" – Sheryl Crow
- "Stupid Girls" – P!nk
- "Black Horse and the Cherry Tree" – KT Tunstall

Best Male Pop Vocal Performance

- **"Waiting On The World To Change" – John Mayer**
- "You're Beautiful" – James Blunt
- "Save Room" – John Legend
- "Jenny Wren" – Paul McCartney
- "Bad Day" – Daniel Powter

Best Pop Performance By A Duo Or Group With Vocal

- **"My Humps" – The Black Eyed Peas**
- "I Will Follow You Into The Dark" – Death Cab For Cutie
- "Over My Head (Cable Car)" – The Fray
- "Is It Any Wonder?" – Keane
- "Stickwitu" – The Pussycat Dolls

Best Pop Collaboration With Vocals

- **"For Once in My Life" – Tony Bennett & Stevie Wonder**
- "One" – Mary J. Blige & U2
- "Always On Your Side" – Sheryl Crow & Sting
- "Promiscuous" – Nelly Furtado & Timbaland
- "Hips Don't Lie" – Shakira & Wyclef Jean

Best Pop Instrumental Performance

- **"Mornin'" – George Benson & Al Jarreau**
- "Drifting" – Enya
- "Subterfuge" – Béla Fleck & The Flecktones
- "Song H" – Bruce Hornsby
- "My Favorite Things" – The Brian Setzer Orchestra

Best Pop Instrumental Album

- **Fingerprints – Peter Frampton**
- New Beginnings – Gerald Albright
- Fire Wire – Larry Carlton
- X – Fourplay
- Wrapped in a Dream – Spyro Gyra

Best Pop Vocal Album

- **Continuum – John Mayer**
- Back to Basics – Christina Aguilera
- Back to Bedlam – James Blunt
- The River in Reverse – Elvis Costello & Allen Toussaint
- FutureSex/LoveSounds – Justin Timberlake

=== Dance ===
Best Dance Recording

- **"SexyBack" – Justin Timberlake**
  - **Nate "Danja" Hills, Timbaland & Justin Timberlake, producers; Jimmy Douglass, mixer**
- "Suffer Well" – Depeche Mode
  - Ben Hillier, producer; Steve Fitzmaurice & Ben Hillier, mixers
- "Ooh La La" – Goldfrapp
  - Goldfrapp, producers; Mark "Spike" Stent, mixer
- "Get Together" – Madonna
  - Madonna & Stuart Price, producers; Mark "Spike" Stent], mixer
- "I'm With Stupid" – Pet Shop Boys
  - Trevor Horn, producer; Robert Orton, mixer

Best Electronic/Dance Album

- **Confessions On A Dance Floor – Madonna**
- Supernature – Goldfrapp
- A Lively Mind – Paul Oakenfold
- Fundamental – Pet Shop Boys
- The Garden – Zero 7

=== Traditional pop ===
Best Traditional Pop Vocal Album

- **Duets: An American Classic – Tony Bennett**
- Caught In The Act – Michael Bublé
- Wintersong – Sarah McLachlan
- Bette Midler Sings the Peggy Lee Songbook – Bette Midler
- Timeless Love – Smokey Robinson

=== Rock ===
Best Solo Rock Vocal Performance

- **"Someday Baby" – Bob Dylan**
- "Nausea" – Beck
- "Route 66" – John Mayer
- "Saving Grace" – Tom Petty
- "Lookin' for a Leader" – Neil Young

Best Rock Performance by a Duo or Group with Vocal

- **"Dani California" – Red Hot Chili Peppers**
- "Talk" – Coldplay
- "How to Save a Life" – The Fray
- "Steady, As She Goes" – The Raconteurs
- "The Saints Are Coming" – U2 & Green Day

Best Hard Rock Performance

- **"Woman" – Wolfmother**
- "Crazy Bitch" – Buckcherry
- "Every Day Is Exactly the Same" – Nine Inch Nails
- "Lonely Day" – System of a Down
- "Vicarious" – Tool

Best Metal Performance

- **"Eyes of the Insane" – Slayer**
- "Redneck" – Lamb of God
- "Colony of Birchmen" – Mastodon
- "LiesLiesLies" – Ministry
- "30/30-150" – Stone Sour

Best Rock Instrumental Performance

- **"The Wizard Turns On..." – The Flaming Lips**
- "Chun Li's Spinning Bird Kick" – Arctic Monkeys
- "Black Hole Sun" – Peter Frampton
- "Castellorizon" – David Gilmour
- "Super Colossal" – Joe Satriani

Best Rock Song

- **"Dani California" – Red Hot Chili Peppers**
  - **Flea, John Frusciante, Anthony Kiedis & Chad Smith, songwriters**
- "Chasing Cars" – Snow Patrol
  - Nathan Connolly, Gary Lightbody, Jonny Quinn, Tom Simpson & Paul Wilson, songwriters
- "Lookin' for a Leader" – Neil Young
  - Neil Young, songwriter
- "Someday Baby" – Bob Dylan
  - Bob Dylan, songwriter
- "When You Were Young" – The Killers
  - Brandon Flowers, Dave Keuning, Mark Stoermer & Ronnie Vannucci, songwriters

Best Rock Album

- **Stadium Arcadium – Red Hot Chili Peppers**
- Try! – John Mayer Trio
- Highway Companion – Tom Petty
- Broken Boy Soldiers – The Raconteurs
- Living with War – Neil Young

=== Alternative ===
Best Alternative Music Album

- **St. Elsewhere – Gnarls Barkley**
- Whatever People Say I Am, That's What I'm Not – Arctic Monkeys
- At War with the Mystics – The Flaming Lips
- Show Your Bones – Yeah Yeah Yeahs
- The Eraser – Thom Yorke

=== R&B ===
Best Female R&B Vocal Performance

- **"Be Without You" – Mary J. Blige**
- "Don't Forget About Us" – Mariah Carey
- "Ring the Alarm" – Beyoncé
- "Day Dreaming" – Natalie Cole
- "I Am Not My Hair" – India.Arie

Best Male R&B Vocal Performance

- **"Heaven" – John Legend**
- "Black Sweat" – Prince
- "Got You Home" – Luther Vandross
- "So Sick" – Ne-Yo
- "I Call It Love" – Lionel Richie

Best R&B Performance By A Duo Or Group With Vocals

- **"Family Affair" – Sly & The Family Stone, John Legend, Joss Stone & Van Hunt**
- "Breezin'" – George Benson & Al Jarreau
- "Love Changes" – Jamie Foxx & Mary J. Blige
- "Everyday (Family Reunion)" – Chaka Khan, Gerald Levert, Yolanda Adams & Carl Thomas
- "Beautiful, Loved And Blessed" – Prince & Támar

Best Traditional R&B Vocal Performance

- **"God Bless the Child" – George Benson, Al Jarreau & Jill Scott**
- "Christmas Time Is Here" – Anita Baker
- "I Found My Everything" – Mary J. Blige & Raphael Saadiq
- "You Are So Beautiful" – Sam Moore Featuring Billy Preston, Zucchero, Eric Clapton & Robert Randolph
- "How Sweet It Is (To Be Loved by You)" – The Temptations

Best Urban/Alternative Performance

- **"Crazy" – Gnarls Barkley**
- "3121" – Prince
- "Idlewild Blue (Don't Chu Worry 'Bout Me)" – Outkast
- "That Heat" – Sérgio Mendes, Erykah Badu & will.i.am
- "Mas Que Nada" – Sérgio Mendes & The Black Eyed Peas

Best R&B Song

- **"Be Without You" – Mary J. Blige**
  - **Johnta Austin, Mary J. Blige, Bryan-Michael Cox & Jason Perry, songwriters**
- "Black Sweat" – Prince
  - Prince, songwriter
- "Deja Vu" – Beyoncé & Jay-Z
  - Shawn Carter, Rodney "Darkchild" Jerkins, Beyoncé, Makeba Riddick, Keli Nicole Price, Delisha Thomas & John Webb, songwriters
- "Don't Forget About Us" – Mariah Carey
  - Johnta Austin, Mariah Carey, Bryan-Michael Cox & Jermaine Dupri, songwriters
- "I Am Not My Hair" – India.Arie
  - Drew Ramsey, Shannon Sanders & India Arie Simpson, songwriters

Best R&B Album

- **The Breakthrough – Mary J. Blige**
- Unpredictable – Jamie Foxx
- Testimony: Vol. 1, Life & Relationship – India.Arie
- 3121 – Prince
- Coming Home – Lionel Richie

Best Contemporary R&B Album

- **B'Day – Beyoncé**
- Chris Brown – Chris Brown
- 20 Y.O. – Janet Jackson
- Kelis Was Here – Kelis
- In My Own Words – Ne-Yo

=== Rap ===
Best Rap Solo Performance

- **"What You Know" – T.I.**
- "Touch It" – Busta Rhymes
- "We Run This" – Missy Elliott
- "Kick, Push" – Lupe Fiasco
- "Undeniable" – Mos Def

Best Rap Performance By A Duo Or Group

- **"Ridin" – Chamillionaire featuring Krayzie Bone**
- "Georgia" – Ludacris & Field Mob featuring Jamie Foxx
- "Grillz" – Nelly featuring Paul Wall, Ali & Gipp
- "Mighty "O"" – Outkast
- "Don't Feel Right" – The Roots

Best Rap/Sung Collaboration

- **"My Love" – Justin Timberlake featuring T.I.**
- "Smack That" – Akon featuring Eminem
- "Deja Vu" – Beyoncé featuring Jay-Z
- "Shake That" – Eminem featuring Nate Dogg
- "Unpredictable" – Jamie Foxx featuring Ludacris

Best Rap Song

- **"Money Maker"**
  - **Christopher Bridges & Pharrell Williams, songwriters (Ludacris featuring Pharrell)**
- "It's Goin' Down"
  - Chadron Moore & Jasiel Robinson, songwriters (Yung Joc)
- "Kick, Push"
  - Wasalu Muhammad Jaco, songwriter (Lupe Fiasco)
- "Ridin"
  - Anthony Henderson, J. Salinas, O. Salinas & Hakeem Seriki, songwriters (Chamillionaire featuring Krayzie Bone)
- "What You Know" – T.I.
  - Aldrin Davis & Clifford Harris, songwriters; (Donny Hathaway, Leroy Hutson & Curtis Mayfield, songwriters) (T.I.)

Best Rap Album

- **Release Therapy – Ludacris**
- Lupe Fiasco's Food & Liquor – Lupe Fiasco
- In My Mind – Pharrell
- Game Theory – The Roots
- King – T.I.

=== Country ===
Best Female Country Vocal Performance

- **"Jesus, Take the Wheel" – Carrie Underwood**
- "Kerosene" – Miranda Lambert
- "I Still Miss Someone" – Martina McBride
- "Something's Gotta Give" – LeAnn Rimes
- "I Don't Feel Like Loving You Today" – Gretchen Wilson

Best Male Country Vocal Performance

- **"The Reason Why" – Vince Gill**
- "Every Mile a Memory" – Dierks Bentley
- "The Seashores of Old Mexico" – George Strait
- "Would You Go with Me" – Josh Turner
- "Once in a Lifetime" – Keith Urban

Best Country Performance by a Duo or Group with Vocal

- **"Not Ready to Make Nice" – Dixie Chicks**
- "Heaven's My Home" – The Duhks
- "Boondocks" – Little Big Town
- "What Hurts the Most" – Rascal Flatts
- "Leave The Pieces" – The Wreckers

Best Country Collaboration with Vocals

- **"Who Says You Can't Go Home" – Bon Jovi & Jennifer Nettles**
- "Tomorrow Is Forever" – Solomon Burke & Dolly Parton
- "Calling Me" – Kenny Rogers & Don Henley
- "Midnight Angel" – Rhonda Vincent & Bobby Osborne
- "Love Will Always Win" – Trisha Yearwood & Garth Brooks

Best Country Instrumental Performance

- **"Whiskey Before Breakfast" – Bryan Sutton & Doc Watson**
- "Jerusalem Ridge" – Casey Driessen
- "Gameshow Rag/Cannonball Rag" – Tommy Emmanuel
- "The Eleventh Reel" – Chris Thile
- "Nature of the Beast" – Jim VanCleve

Best Country Song

- **"Jesus, Take The Wheel"**
  - **Brett James, Hillary Lindsey & Gordie Sampson, songwriters (Carrie Underwood)**
- "Every Mile a Memory"
  - Brett Beavers, Dierks Bentley & Steve Bogard, songwriters (Dierks Bentley)
- "I Don't Feel Like Loving You Today"
  - Matraca Berg & Jim Collins, songwriters (Gretchen Wilson)
- "Like Red on a Rose"
  - Melanie Castleman & Robert Lee Castleman, songwriters (Alan Jackson)
- "What Hurts the Most"
  - Steve Robson & Jeffrey Steele, songwriters (Rascal Flatts)

Best Country Album

- **Taking the Long Way – Dixie Chicks**
- Like Red on a Rose – Alan Jackson
- The Road to Here – Little Big Town
- You Don't Know Me: The Songs of Cindy Walker – Willie Nelson
- Your Man – Josh Turner

Best Bluegrass Album

- **Instrumentals – Ricky Skaggs & Kentucky Thunder**
- Long List of Heartaches – The Grascals
- Bluegrass – Jim Lauderdale
- Live at the Ryman – Marty Stuart and His Fabulous Superlatives
- All American Bluegrass Girl – Rhonda Vincent

=== New Age ===
Best New Age Album

- **Amaratine – Enya**
- A Posteriori – Enigma
- Beyond Words – Gentle Thunder, Will Clipman & AmoChip Dabney
- Elements Series: Fire – Peter Kater
- The Magical Journeys of Andreas Vollenweider – Andreas Vollenweider

=== Jazz ===
Best Contemporary Jazz Album

- **The Hidden Land – Béla Fleck and the Flecktones**
- People People Music Music – Groove Collective
- Rewind That – Christian Scott
- Sexotica – Sex Mob
- Who Let the Cats Out? – Mike Stern

Best Jazz Vocal Album

- **Turned To Blue – Nancy Wilson**
- Footprints – Karrin Allyson
- Easy To Love – Roberta Gambarini
- Live At Jazz Standard With Fred Hersch – Nancy King
- From This Moment On – Diana Krall

Best Jazz Instrumental Solo

- **"Some Skunk Funk" – Michael Brecker**
- "Paq Man" – Paquito D'Rivera
- "Freedom Jazz Dance" – Taylor Eigsti
- "Hippidy Hop" (Drum Solo) – Roy Haynes
- "Hope" – Branford Marsalis

Best Jazz Instrumental Album, Individual or Group

- **The Ultimate Adventure – Chick Corea**
- Sound Grammar – Ornette Coleman
- Saudades – Trio Beyond
- Beyond the Wall – Kenny Garrett
- Sonny, Please – Sonny Rollins

Best Large Jazz Ensemble Album

- **Some Skunk Funk – Randy Brecker with Michael Brecker, Jim Beard, Will Lee, Peter Erskine, Marcio Doctor and Vince Mendoza conducting The WDR Big Band Köln**
- Spirit Music – Bob Brookmeyer and the New Art Orchestra
- Streams of Expression – the Joe Lovano Ensemble
- Live In Tokyo At The Blue Note – Mingus Big Band
- Up From The Skies, Music of Jim McNeely – The Vanguard Jazz Orchestra

Best Latin Jazz Album

- **Simpático – The Brian Lynch/Eddie Palmieri Project**
- Codes – Ignacio Berroa
- Cubist Music – Edsel Gomez
- Absolute Quintet – Dafnis Prieto
- Viva – Diego Urcola, Edward Simon, Avishai Cohen, Antonio Sánchez and Pernell Saturnino

=== Gospel ===
Best Gospel Performance

- **"Victory" – Yolanda Adams**
- "Not Forgotten" – Israel and New Breed
- "The Blessing Of Abraham" – Donald Lawrence & The Tri-City Singers
- "Made To Worship" – Chris Tomlin
- "Victory" – Tye Tribbett & G.A.

Best Gospel Song

- **"Imagine Me"**
  - **Kirk Franklin, songwriter (Kirk Franklin)**
- "The Blessing Of Abraham"
  - Donald Lawrence, songwriter (Donald Lawrence & The Tri-City Singers)
- "Mountain Of God"
  - Brown Bannister & Mac Powell, songwriters (Third Day)
- "Not Forgotten"
  - Israel Houghton & Aaron Lindsey, songwriters (Israel & New Breed)
- "Victory"
  - Tye Tribbett, songwriter (Tye Tribbett & G.A.)

Best Rock or Rap Gospel Album

- **Turn Around – Jonny Lang**
- Bone-A-Fide – T-Bone
- End of Silence – Red
- DecembeRadio – DecembeRadio
- Where the Past Meets Today – Sarah Kelly

Best Pop/Contemporary Gospel Album

- **Wherever You Are – Third Day**
- Sound of Melodies – Leeland
- Coming Up to Breathe – MercyMe
- See the Morning – Chris Tomlin
- Introducing Ayiesha Woods – Ayiesha Woods

Best Southern, Country or Bluegrass Gospel Album

- **Glory Train – Randy Travis**
- Kenny Bishop – Kenny Bishop
- Give It Away – Gaither Vocal Band
- Precious Memories – Alan Jackson
- The Promised Land – The Del McCoury Band

Best Traditional Gospel Album

- **Alive In South Africa – Israel and New Breed**
- An Invitation To Worship – Byron Cage
- Paved The Way – The Caravans
- Still Keeping It Real – The Dixie Hummingbirds
- Finalé Act One – Donald Lawrence & The Tri-City Singers

Best Contemporary R&B Gospel Album

- **Hero – Kirk Franklin**
- Set Me Free – Myron Butler & Levi
- A Timeless Christmas – Israel and New Breed
- This Is Me – Kierra Sheard
- Victory Live! – Tye Tribbett & G.A.

=== Latin ===
Best Latin Pop Album

- **Adentro** – Ricardo Arjona (tie)
- **Limón y sal** – Julieta Venegas (tie)
- Lo que trajo el barco – Obie Bermúdez
- Individual – Fulano
- Trozos de mi alma 2 – Marco Antonio Solis

Best Latin Rock, Alternative Or Urban Album

- **Amar es combatir** – Maná
- Lo demás es plástico – Black Guayaba
- The Underdog / El subestimado – Tego Calderón
- Calle 13 – Calle 13
- Superpop Venezuela de Amigos Invisibles

Best Tropical Latin Album

- **Directo al corazón** – Gilberto Santa Rosa
- Fuzionando – Oscar D'Leon
- Salsatón: Salsa con reggaetón – Andy Montañez
- Hoy, mañana y siempre – Tito Nieves
- What You've Been Waiting For – Lo que esperabas – Tiempo Libre

Best Mexican/Mexican-American Album

- **Historias de mi tierra** – Pepe Aguilar
- No es brujería – Ana Bárbara
- 25 Aniversario – Mariachi Sol de Mexico de José Hernández
- A toda ley – Pablo Montero
- Orgullo de mujer – Alicia Villarreal

Best Tejano Album

- **Sigue el Taconazo** – Chente Barrera y Taconazo
- Also nominated were:
- Live In Session – Bob Gallarza
- All Of Me – Jay Perez
- Rebecca Valadez – Rebecca Valadez

Best Norteño Album

- **Historias que contar** – Tigres del Norte
- Algo de mí – Conjunto Primavera
- Puro pa' arriba – Huracanes del Norte
- Piénsame un momento – Pesado
- Prefiero la soledad – Retoño

Best Banda Album

- **Más allá del sol** – Joan Sebastian
- 20 vil heridas – Banda Machos
- Mas fuerte que nunca – Banda El Recodo de Cruz Lizárraga
- Amor gitano – Cuisillos
- A mucha honra – Ezequiel Peña

=== Blues ===
Best Traditional Blues Album

- **Risin' with the Blues – Ike Turner**
- Brother To The Blues – Tab Benoit & Louisiana's Leroux
- Bronx In Blue – Dion
- People Gonna Talk – James Hunter
- Guitar Groove-A-Rama – Duke Robillard

Best Contemporary Blues Album

- **After the Rain – Irma Thomas**
- Live from Across the Pond – Robert Cray Band
- Sippiana Hericane – Dr. John & The Lower 911
- Suitcase – Keb' Mo'
- Hope and Desire – Susan Tedeschi

=== Folk ===
Best Traditional Folk Album

- **We Shall Overcome: The Seeger Sessions – Bruce Springsteen**
- I Stand Alone – Ramblin' Jack Elliott
- Gonna Let It Shine – Odetta
- Adieu False Heart – Linda Ronstadt & Ann Savoy
- A Distant Land to Roam: Songs of The Carter Family – Ralph Stanley

Best Contemporary Folk/American Album

- **Modern Times – Bob Dylan**
- Solo Acoustic, Vol. 1 – Jackson Browne
- Black Cadillac – Rosanne Cash
- Workbench Songs – Guy Clark
- All the Roadrunning – Mark Knopfler & Emmylou Harris

Best Native American Music Album

- **Dance with the Wind - Mary Youngblood**
- Voice of the Drum – Black Eagle
- Heart of the Wind – Robert Tree Cody & Will Clipman
- American Indian Story – Jana
- Long Winter Nights – Northern Cree & Friends

Best Hawaiian Music Album

- **Legends of Hawaiian Slack Key Guitar - Live from Maui – Various Artists**
- Generation Hawai'i – Amy Hānaialiʻi
- Grandmaster Slack Key Guitar – Ledward Kaapana
- The Wild Hawaiian – Henry Kapono
- Hawaiian Slack Key Kings – Various Artists

=== Reggae ===
Best Reggae Album

- **Love Is My Religion – Ziggy Marley**
- Too Bad – Buju Banton
- Youth – Matisyahu
- Rhythm Doubles – Sly and Robbie
- Who You Fighting For? – UB40

=== World Music ===
Best Traditional World Music Album

- **Blessed – Soweto Gospel Choir**
- Music of Central Asia, Vol. 2: Invisible Face of the Beloved: Classical Music of the Tajiks and Uzbeks – The Academy of Maqâm
- Endless Vision – Hossein Alizadeh & Djivan Gasparyan
- Hambo in the Snow – Andrea Hoag, Loretta Kelley and Charlie Pilzer
- Golden Strings of the Sarode – Aashish Khan & Zakir Hussain

Best Contemporary World Music Album

- **Wonder Wheel – The Klezmatics**
- Tiki – Richard Bona
- M'Bemba – Salif Keita
- Long Walk to Freedom – Ladysmith Black Mambazo
- Savane – Ali Farka Touré

=== Polka ===
Best Polka Album

- **Polka in Paradise – Jimmy Sturr and His Orchestra**
- Batteries Not Included – Eddie Blazonczyk's Versatones
- As Sweet As Candy – Lenny Gomulka & Chicago Push
- Party Dress – LynnMarie & The Boxhounds
- Good Friends Good Music – Walter Ostanek & Fred Ziwich

=== Children's ===
Best Musical Album for Children

- **Catch That Train! – Dan Zanes and Friends**
- Baby Einstein: Meet the Orchestra – Various Artists
- Beethoven's Wig 3: Many More Sing Along Symphonies – Beethoven's Wig
- My Best Day – Trout Fishing in America
- The Sunny Side of the Street – John Lithgow

Best Spoken Word Album for Children

- **Blah Blah Blah: Stories About Clams, Swamp Monsters, Pirates & Dogs – Bill Harley**
- Christmas In The Trenches – John McCutcheon
- Disney's Little Einsteins Musical Missions (Various Artists) – Ted Kryczko & Ed Mitchell, producers
- Peter Pan – Jim Dale
- The Witches – Lynn Redgrave

=== Spoken word ===
Best Spoken Word Album (Includes Poetry, Audio Books & Story Telling)

- **Our Endangered Values: America's Moral Crisis – Jimmy Carter**
- **With Ossie And Ruby: In This Life Together** – Ossie Davis & Ruby Dee (tie)
- I Shouldn't Even Be Doing This! – Bob Newhart
- New Rules — Polite Musings From A Timid Observer – Bill Maher
- The Truth (with jokes) – Al Franken

=== Comedy ===
Best Comedy Album (For comedy recordings, spoken or musical)

- **The Carnegie Hall Performance** – Lewis Black
- Blue Collar Comedy Tour – One For The Road – Bill Engvall, Ron White, Jeff Foxworthy & Larry The Cable Guy
- Life Is Worth Losing – George Carlin
- Straight Outta Lynwood – "Weird Al" Yankovic
- You Can't Fix Stupid – Ron White

=== Classical ===
Best Classical Album

- Mahler: Symphony No. 7
  - Michael Tilson Thomas, conductor; Andreas Neubronner, producer

Best Orchestra Performance

- Mahler: Symphony No. 7
  - Michael Tilson Thomas, conductor; Andreas Neubronner, producer; Peter Laenger, engineer (San Francisco Symphony)

Best Opera Recording

- "Golijov: Ainadamar: Fountain Of Tears"
  - Robert Spano, conductor; Valerie Gross & Sid McLauchlan, producers; Kelley O'Connor, Jessica Rivera & Dawn Upshaw, soloists; Stephan Flock & Wolf-Dieter Karwatky, engineers (Women Of The Atlanta Symphony Orchestra Chorus; Atlanta Symphony Orchestra)

Best Choral Performance

- "Pärt: Da Pacem"
  - Paul Hillier, conductor; Brad Michel & Robina G. Young, producers; Brad Michel, engineer/mixer (Estonian Philharmonic Chamber Choir)

Best Instrumental Soloist(s) Performance (with Orchestra)

- Messiaen: Oiseaux exotiques (Exotic Birds)
  - Angelin Chang (Cleveland Chamber Symphony)

Best Instrumental Soloist Performance (without Orchestra)

- Chopin: Nocturnes
  - Maurizio Pollini, soloist; Christopher Alder, producer; Klaus Hiemann & Oliver Rogalla Von Heyden, engineers

Best Chamber Music Performance

- "Intimate Voices"
  - Emerson String Quartet (Eugene Drucker, Lawrence Dutton, David Finckel & Philip Setzer), ensembles; Da-Hong Seetoo, producer

Best Small Ensemble Performance

- "Padilla: Sun Of Justice"
  - Fred Vogler, producer; Peter Rutenberg, conductor; Los Angeles Chamber Singers' Capella (Corey Carleton), ensembles; Fred Vogler, engineer

Best Classical Vocal Performance

- "Rilke Songs"
  - Lorraine Hunt Lieberson, soloist

Best Classical Contemporary Composition

- "Golijov: Ainadamar: Fountain Of Tears"
  - Osvaldo Golijov, composer

Best Classical Crossover Album

- "Simple Gifts"
  - Bryn Terfel, soloist; Sid McLauchlan, producer; Stephan Flock & Piotr Furmanczyk, engineers

=== Music video ===
Best Short Form Music Video

- "**Here It Goes Again**" – Ok Go

Best Long Form Music Video

- **Wings for Wheels: The Making of Born to Run** – Bruce Springsteen

Grammy Award for Best Recording Package

- **10,000 Days** - Tool by Adam Jones
- The Best Worst-Case Scenario - Fair by Ryan Clark
- Personal File - Johnny Cash by Randall Martin
- Reprieve - Ani DiFranco by Ani DiFranco and Brian Grunert
- Versions by Thievery Corporation

== In memoriam ==
Maynard Ferguson

Michael Brecker

Ray Barretto

Anita O'Day

Alice Coltrane

Robert Lockwood Jr.

Floyd Dixon

June Pointer

Arthur Lee (musician)

Phil Walden

Elisabeth Schwarzkopf

Malcolm Arnold

Sarah Caldwell

Denny Doherty

Henry Lewy

Syd Barrett

Ian Copeland

Ali Farka Touré

Soraya (musician)

Georgia Gibbs

Frankie Laine

Irving Green

Gene Pitney

Buck Owens

Cindy Walker

Buddy Killen

Freddy Fender

Desmond Dekker

Ed Bradley

J Dilla

Ruth Brown

Billy Preston

Arif Mardin

Gerald Levert

Ahmet Ertegun

James Brown
