= Gungor =

Musical collective

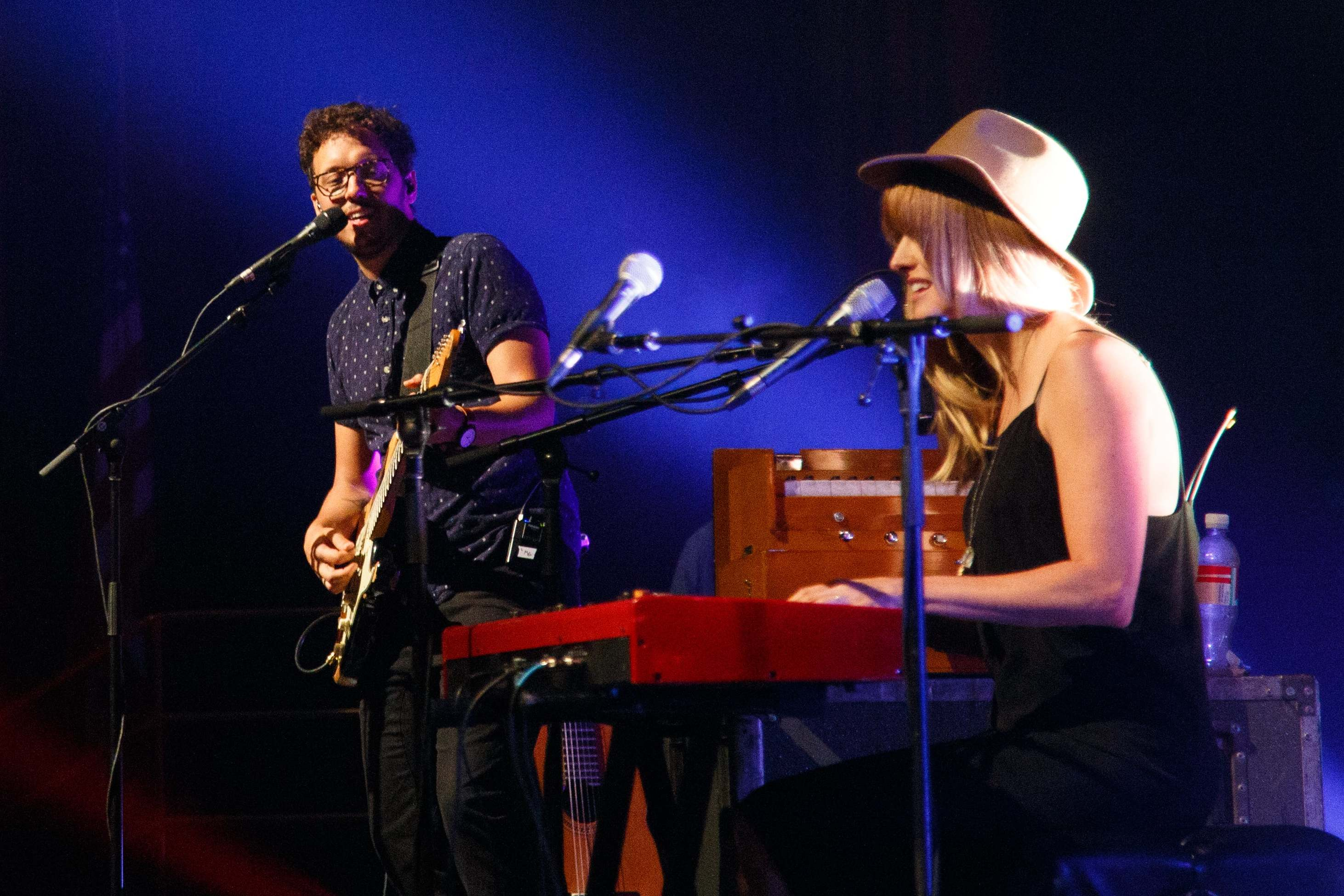
- Gungor performing live in August 2015

Background information
- Genres: Baroque pop; folk; experimental rock; contemporary worship music
- Years active: 2006–present
- Labels: Brash, CD Listening Bar/Hither & Yon
- Members: Michael Gungor; Lisa Gungor
- Website: gungormusic.com

Gungor is a band formed by husband and wife duo Michael Gungor and Lisa Gungor. The group's music has been compared to the music of Sufjan Stevens, Bon Iver and Arcade Fire.

The band has released seven studio albums, the last one appearing in August 2025. These albums explored a broad musical soundscape and charted the couple's changing beliefs from traditional Christianity through a more panentheistic worldview, other religions, and apophatic theology. In early 2018, they announced a shift in direction that would see Gungor return to the progressive spiritual space, while the less mainstream material will move to "other projects" including Michael and Lisa's solo projects.

== History ==
Michael Gungor grew up in Marshfield southeast of Eau Claire, Wisconsin. He is the son of pastor and author Ed Gungor. Michael began writing and playing music at a young age and studied jazz guitar at both Western Michigan University in Kalamazoo and the University of North Texas in Denton while also touring and working as a performer playing multiple instruments.

Lisa Gungor grew up in Deming west of Las Cruces, New Mexico. She came from a "sports-crazed" family and did not fully commit to her musical abilities until her senior year in high school. Michael and Lisa met at Oral Roberts University in Tulsa, Oklahoma, during their first year.

=== Early career ===
Michael and Lisa were worship leaders at Resurrection Life Church in Grandville near Grand Rapids, Michigan. In 2002, Michael began producing albums with his church. The albums caught the attention of Integrity Music, who signed Michael for a solo album. In 2003, he released Bigger Than My Imagination under Integrity Media. Lisa also sang on the album.

In 2005 Michael and Lisa released a live album titled Battle Cry: Worship from the Frontlines, through Integrity Media.

=== The Michael Gungor Band ===
In 2006, Michael Gungor parted ways with Integrity Music, seeking more creative control over his music. He then formed The Michael Gungor Band, consisting of himself on guitar and vocals, his wife Lisa on vocals, and Brad Waller. They released the album All I Need Is Here in 2007. In 2008, they signed with Brash Records. The label re-released All I Need Is Here in 2008 as Ancient Skies, omitting two songs and adding the upbeat rock opener "Say So", as well as a song sung by Lisa, "You Are The Light".

=== 2010–2014: Gungor ===
Michael Gungor renamed the group from The Michael Gungor Band to simply Gungor in 2010. The first album release under the new name was Beautiful Things in 2010 that features a short gospel-blues jam featuring Israel Houghton titled "Heaven". In 2011, the album and its title track, "Beautiful Things", were nominated in the Grammy categories Best Rock or Rap Gospel Album and Best Gospel Song, respectively.

In 2011, Gungor released Ghosts Upon the Earth. Gungor followed up with a live album, A Creation Liturgy in 2012. The band's third studio album, I Am Mountain, was released on September 24, 2013. On October 24, 2013, the band began its 60-city headline tour across the U.S., Canada, Australia, New Zealand, and Europe.

Though Gungor's music is filled with Christian themes, the band has attempted to distance itself from being labeled simply a "Christian" band due to the problematic way the term may be used. Michael refers to Gungor as a collective because at any given time the group is composed of 3–10 members. He and his wife believe that their music transcends one genre. Gungor write songs that are a mix of indie rock, post rock, progressive rock, soft rock and more. If asked, Michael describes his song style as "alternative, folk, textured and experimental." They performed at SXSW 2014.

=== 2015–2017: One Wild Life ===
In 2015, Gungor embarked on their most ambitious creative project thus far: One Wild Life. The band released three full-length albums—Soul, Spirit and Body—in a span of a year. One Wild Life: Soul began the trilogy on August 7, 2015. While each record carries a distinct vibe, the album series presents a body of work which celebrates the adventure and challenges faced by Michael and Lisa Gungor since the release of their previous album "I Am Mountain". One Wild Life: Soul charted on multiple Billboard charts the first week of release, including Billboard 200. On One Wild Life: Soul, Michael and Lisa wrote a song dedicated to Lucie, their youngest daughter, who was diagnosed with Down syndrome.

=== 2018–2020: Hiatus and Archives ===
On April 26, 2018, Gungor announced on the band's official Facebook page that they were going to address the "multiple personality thing going on within its musical stylings" by bringing Gungor back to its roots in "the progressive spiritual space, and finding different homes for some of the other music that we've tried unsuccessfully to fundamentally change the Gungor brand with". This was accompanied by the removal of I Am Mountain and One Wild Life series from online stores and streaming services, the latter being replaced by a 90-minute "director's cut" of the three albums. Michael and Lisa also announced an upcoming solo album each in the post.

On February 1, 2019, the band announced that their upcoming "End of the World" Tour would be "Gungor's farewell tour". While Michael and Lisa continue to make music, future projects would no longer be recorded under the Gungor band name. On March 1, 2019, the band released Archives, an album intended to wind down the project. Archives is composed of previously unreleased material as well as re-released material.

=== 2021–present: Praise and Love Song to Life ===
Beginning in 2021 the group began releasing singles, including collaborations and original songs and announced they were releasing an album which they described as attempt to make "worship music again that would be enjoyable for people who might not fit the traditional religious boxes". In February 2022 they released an EP of covers Praise. In November 2022 they released Love Song to Life their first studio album since 2016.

== Discography ==
Title	Album details	Peak chart positions
Title	Album details	US
All I Need Is Here (As The Michael Gungor Band)	Released: 2007; Label: Brash Music	—
Ancient Skies (As The Michael Gungor Band)	Released: October 9, 2008; Label: Brash Music	—
Beautiful Things	Released: February 16, 2010; Label: Brash Music	—
Ghosts Upon the Earth	Released: September 20, 2011; Label: Brash Music	43
A Creation Liturgy (Live)	Released: October 9, 2012; Label: Brash Music	194
I Am Mountain	Released: September 24, 2013; Label: Hither & Yon Records	50
One Wild Life: Soul	Released: August 7, 2015; Label: Hither & Yon Records	118
One Wild Life: Spirit	Released: March 25, 2016; Label: Hither & Yon Records	—
One Wild Life: Body	Released: September 30, 2016	—
Archives	Released: March 1, 2019	—
Love Song to Life	Released: November 11, 2022	—
Magnificat	Released: August 8, 2025	—
"—" denotes a recording that did not chart or was not released in that territory.

== Awards ==
- Independent Music Awards 2013: A Creation Liturgy (Live) – Best Live Performance Album

== See also ==
- Kevin Olusola who performed on several tours with the band
