= A Deeper Level =

Live album by Israel & New Breed
- Released: 2007
- Genre: Christian
- Label: Integrity Media

Israel & New Breed chronology
A Timeless Christmas (2006)	A Deeper Level (2007)	The Power of One (2009)

A Deeper Level is a live worship album by Israel & New Breed. It was released in 2007 by Integrity Media. It is Houghton's seventh album, his sixth with Integrity, and his fourth live album serving as the follow-up to Alive in South Africa

The album was awarded a Grammy in 2008 as the Best Pop/Contemporary Gospel Album.

== Track listing ==
Source: Amazon

No.	Title	Length
1.	"So Come" (Intro)	1:55
2.	"So Come"	3:46
3.	"Prayers Of The Righteous"	6:22
4.	"Say So"	4:31
5.	"With Long Life" (Featuring T-Bone)	6:06
6.	"With Long Life" (Speaking)	2:25
7.	"Identity"	4:11
8.	"I Know Who I Am" (Featuring Chris Tomlin)	5:59
9.	"I Will Search"	6:35
10.	"Surely Surely" (Featuring YPJ)	7:26
11.	"Surely Surely" (Speaking)	2:54
12.	"If Not For Your Grace"	7:50
13.	"Deeper Prayer" (Featuring Darlene Zschech)	2:14
14.	"Deeper"	6:46
15.	"We Have Overcome"	4:41
16.	"Overcomerture"	1:29
17.	"You Are Not Forgotten" (Bonus Cut, featuring Jonny Lang)	4:09

== NEW BREED ==
=== Band ===
- Israel Houghton - Piano
- Aaron Lindsey - Keyboards
- Terrance Palmer - Bass
- Johnny Najara - Guitar
- Arthur Strong - Keyboards
- Ryan Edgar - Acoustic Guitar
- Mike Clemons - Drums
- Justin Raines - Bass, Keyboard Bass
- Eric Brice - Guitar
- Justin Savage - Keyboards, Organ
- Neville Diedericks - Guitar
- Javier Solis - Percussion
- Michael Gungor - Guitar
- Jerry Harris - Keyboards, Programming
- Christa Black - Violin
- Vinnie Ciesielski - Trumpet
- Jimmy Bolin - Saxophone
- Roy Agee - Trombone

=== Vocalists ===
- Olanrewaju Agbabiaka
- Dakri Brown
- Lois DuPlessis
- Ryan Edgar
- Jamil Freeman
- Daniel Johnson
- Rodney Jordan
- Stacey Joseph
- Mattie Blackburn
- Sha' Simpson
- Leah Smith
- Danielle Stephens
- Jeremiah Woods

== Awards ==
In 2008, the album won a Dove Award for Contemporary Gospel Album of the Year at the 39th GMA Dove Awards.
