= Keep On Walking =

Keep On Walking or Keep On Walkin' may refer to:

- Keep On Walkin' (album), 2008 album and its title song by The Grascals
- "Keep On Walking" (Salem Al Fakir song)
- "Keep On Walking" (Scouting for Girls song)
- "Keep On Walkin'" (song), song by CeCe Peniston
- "Keep On Walking", 1975 song by Gino Vannelli from Storm at Sunup
- "Keep On Walkin'", 1992 single release by Mike Reid from Twilight Town
