= Love God, Love People =

Love God. Love People.: The London Sessions

Studio album by Israel Houghton
- Released: July 13, 2010
- Recorded: 2009–2010
- Studio: Abbey Road Studios
- Genre: Contemporary worship
- Length: 1:12:08
- Label: Integrity Music/Columbia
- Producers: Israel Houghton, Aaron W. Lindsey, Tommy Sims

Israel Houghton chronology
The Power of One (2009)	Love God. Love People.: The London Sessions (2010)	Decade (2012)

Love God. Love People.: The London Sessions is an album released by gospel singer Israel Houghton. It was released on July 13, 2010, through Integrity Music and Columbia.

== Production and recording ==
Love God. Love People.: The London Sessions was produced by Houghton with longtime collaborator Aaron W. Lindsey, and Tommy Sims. Houghton, Lindsey, and Sims also co-wrote five of the songs, including the first gospel single, "You Hold My World", which was nominated for a Dove Award. Three additional songs were penned by Houghton and his wife Meleasa."

The album was recorded and engineered by Danny Duncan at Abbey Road Studios in London."

== Track listing ==
Love God. Love People.: The London Sessions track listing
No.	Title	Writer(s)	Length
1.	"Love God Love People"	Israel Houghton; Aaron Lindsey; Tommy Sims	4:49
2.	"Yahweh (The Lifter)"	I. Houghton; Lindsey; Sims	3:57
3.	"Love Rev"	I. Houghton; Lindsey; Sims	5:23
4.	"That's Why I Love You"	I. Houghton; Lindsey	6:28
5.	"Others"	I. Houghton; Meleasa Houghton	5:13
6.	"You Hold My World"	I. Houghton; Lindsey; Sims	6:38
7.	"You Won't Let Go"	I. Houghton; Michael Gungor	3:01
8.	"Our God"	Jonas Myrin; Jesse Reeves; Chris Tomlin; Matt Redman	4:59
9.	"Mercies" (featuring Kirk Franklin)	I. Houghton; M. Houghton; Lindsey	4:21
10.	"Surprises" (featuring Fred Hammond)	I. Houghton; M. Houghton	7:26
11.	"Name of Love"	I. Houghton; Lindsey; Sims	6:37
12.	"Hosanna (Be Lifted Higher)"	I. Houghton; Sidney Mohede	8:33
Total length:			1:07:25

No.	Title	Length
13.	"Love God Love People (Incorporated Elements Remix)" (bonus track)	4:45
Total length:		1:12:08

== Personnel ==
- Israel Houghton: lead and background vocals, acoustic guitars
- Aaron Lindsey: keys, B3, piano, bass, upright piano, drum programming, background and hype vocals
- Akil Thompson: Electric Guitars
- Teddy Campbell: drums
- Tommy Sims: drum programming, keys, bass, B3, WTLS DJ, old man voice sample
- Michael Gungor: nylon, acoustic and electric guitars
- Javier Solis: percussion
- Dan Needham: drums, field snare, programming
- Fred Hammond: bass (10)
- The London Session Orchestra: strings
- Eriway: saluang, bansi flutes
- New Breed (Daniel Johnson, Erica King, Charlin Moore, Lois Duplessis, Krystle Harper, Jeremiah Woods, Chris Lawson, Shawn Flowers): background vocals

== Awards ==
In 2011, the album was awarded a Grammy as the Best Pop/Contemporary Gospel Album at the 53rd Grammy Awards. It also won a Dove Award for Contemporary Gospel Album of the Year at the 42nd GMA Dove Awards, while the song "You Hold My World" was nominated for Contemporary Gospel Recorded Song of the Year.
