= Jesus at the Center: Live =

Live album by Israel & New Breed
- Released: August 14, 2012
- Recorded: February 2012
- Genre: Contemporary worship
- Length: 138:34
- Labels: Integrity; Columbia

Israel & New Breed chronology
Decade (2012)	Jesus at the Center: Live (2012)	Jesús En El Centro: En Vivo (2012)

Jesus at the Center: Live is a contemporary worship live album recorded and performed by Israel & New Breed. The album is released by Integrity Media and Columbia Records. The album was recorded live at Lakewood Church in early February 2012.

== Reception ==
=== Critical ===
Professional ratings
Review scores
Source	Rating
About.com (Kim Jones)	5/5 stars
AllMusic (Andree Farias)	3.5/5 stars
CCM Magazine (Andy Argyrakis)	4/5 stars
The Christian Manifesto (Lydia Akinola)	4.5/5 stars
Cross Rhythms (Doug Holland)	9/10 stars
ganns DEEN (Ganns Deen)	5/5 stars
Indie Vision Music (Jonathan Andre)	3/5 stars
Louder Than the Music (Jono Davies)	5/5 stars
New Release Tuesday (Dwayne Lacy)	5/5 stars
The Phantom Tollbooth (Bert Saraco)	3/5 stars
Worship Leader (Andrea Hunter)	5/5 stars

About.com's Kim Jones wrote about the album: "knockout punches that leave you smiling and wanting more are what you will get on Jesus At The Center. Compelling songs, larger-than-life passion, awe-inspiring musicianship ... this release has it all."

CCM Magazine's Andy Argyrakis said that "For its first live album in five years, Israel & New Breed picks up right where it left off with a rousing batch of Christ-centered songwriting. Stylistically, the double disc set is loaded with soul, pop, and modern worship, alternating between praise romps and chilling ballads that are sure to stir the soul."

The Christian Manifesto's Lydia Akinola said that her "only quibble with Jesus at the Centre is the same problem I’ve always had with New Breed projects. It’s almost too good to be true; in pushing the boundaries, have the group forfeited on the Sunday morning market, the bread and butter of worship music? How will these songs translate to churches worldwide? Whilst the album sounds spectacular, it will be very hard for the average worship group to emulate." In addition, Akinola wrote that "Undoubtedly, Jesus at the Centre is a triumph, a magnificent return for Israel & New Breed. After a considerable wait, this two-disc beauty is worth every penny. Fans of the juggernaut and his crew will rediscover every reason why they love this unique brand of worship; those of you who have been living under a rock can finally discover what happens when praise becomes an art form."

Cross Rhythms' Doug Holland said that "Israel Houghton And New Breed return with their first live recording in five years, a typically fast-paced and colourful gospel/funk/jazz/pop mix that delights, inspires and uplifts in equal measure and at virtually every turn. Recorded over three nights in Houghton's home town of Houston, Texas in early 2012, the two CDs comprise 21 tracks and provide something over two hours and 20 minutes of music which is relentlessly energetic and at the same time uncompromisingly worshipful. The congregation participation adds a very genuine feel to the recording. For over 10 years now Israel and the New Breed band have brought their gospel-based energy and superb musicianship to bear on the worship experience and this album is an excellent return to the CD racks."

ganns DEEN's Ganns Deen said that it "is no ordinary project." Furthermore, Deen wrote that "Jesus at the Centre is a topnotch worship album that is arguably the best of the group’s long and storied career. Musically, lyrically, vocally, production-wise, Jesus at the Centre is probably the closest to a worship experience in Heaven as I’ve ever experienced to date." This is because Deen believes it "chock-full of tremendous praise songs" in which "they take their praise to a whole new level."

Indie Vision Music's Jonathan Andre said that "Jesus at the Center has about every genre covered from gospel to rap, hip-hop, dance as well as some heartfelt melodies of hopefulness. As I reflect upon how God holds all things together, I am amazed by creation, and through the epic quest of Jesus to earth, dying and raising to life; that I am able to be confident as I walk along with Christ through everyday life. Featuring some of my favourite songs from Israel of all time, this album certainly was a surprise in August- creating such a dynamic worship atmosphere as I soak in God’s presence". Andre called it "A must buy if you’re a fan of Israel and the New Breed, this album stretches musical boundaries and incorporates a wide variety of genres."

Louder Than the Music's Jono Davies said that "Of course there are one or two songs that stand out more than others, with the title track being one of them. But I found myself worshipping during the whole album, and that's what this album wants you to do. When Israel and the band sing, something special happens. One moment you will have you arms in the air, jumping up and down telling God how amazing He is, then the next moment you will be on your knees crying out to God." Davies concluded with saying "This album is all for the glory of God and He deserves every praise we give Him."

New Release Tuesday's Dwayne Lacy closed with saying that "The term classic has been used too loosely even by me at times, but Jesus at the Center is just that. Israel and New Breed gives us something for everyone. The band is on point; the singers' vocals are tight and impressive. The songs are diverse and very well written. There are songs that can be enjoyed at many different types of churches. Some may not like the fact that Israel included a few songs that he contributed to albums by other artists, but there is just something hearing New Breed's take on them. This will be money well spent and you will want to buy it for others to enjoy."

The Phantom Tollbooth's Bert Saraco said that "For those that have been waiting for Houghton to get back to New Breed, this might be the album of the year. For those who were happy to see Houghton stretch his creative wings on his recent solo work, this album might just make you scratch your heads." Saraco called the album "A bumper-crop of live 'Praise and Worship' music – Israel Houghton style – awaits you in Jesus at The Center, the new double-disc live recording by Israel & New Breed. Fans of New Breed will delight in every moment of the dynamic and energetic performance, although others might find much of it to be generic. Generic and energetic – perhaps a formula a bit too easy for the talented Houghton, whose last two solo projects were powerful and showed a creative edge that was both surprising and refreshing."

== Track listing ==
Disc 1
No.	Title	Writer(s)	Length
1.	"The Intro"	Israel Houghton; Micah Massey; Adam Ranney	04:00
2.	"Jesus The Same"	Houghton; Aaron Lindsey	05:23
3.	"Rez Power" (Feat. Jeremiah Woods)	Houghton; Jeremiah Woods	04:48
4.	"No Turning Back" (Feat. Aaron Lindsey)	Houghton; Lindsey	08:35
5.	"Te Amo" (Feat. T-Bone)	I. Houghton; Meleasa Houghton; Lindsey; Ricardo Sanchez; Rene "M.C. T-Bone" Sotomayor	06:35
6.	"More Than Enough" (Feat. Krystle Harper & Onaje Jefferson)	I. Houghton; Kelley Steele	05:35
7.	"Overflow" (Feat. Daniel Johnson, Bishop Michael Pitts)	I. Houghton; Steele	10:22
8.	"I Call You Jesus"	I Houghton; Joth Hunt	05:50
9.	"Church Medley: Jesus Is The Sweetest Name I Know/Oh How I Love Jesus" (Feat. Feat. Onaje Jefferson, Daniel Johnson & Charlin Moore)	Lela B. Long; Frederick Whitfield	05:49
10.	"Jesus At The Center"	I. Houghton; Massey; Ranney	09:37

Disc 2
No.	Title	Writer(s)	Length
1.	"Jesus At The Center (Reprise)"	I. Houghton; Massey; Ranney	01:25
2.	"Speechless" (Feat. Elder Tina Baker & Adam Ranney)	I. Houghton; Ranney	06:15
3.	"It's Not Over (When God Is in It)" (Feat. Aaron Lindsey)	I. Houghton; Lindsey; Sanchez	07:34
4.	"Your Presence Is Heaven"	I. Houghton; Massey	08:41
5.	"More And More" (Feat. Onaje Jefferson)	I. Houghton; Doug Enquist; Amante Lacey; Scharita Lacey; BJ Putnam	10:57
6.	"Hosanna/Moving Forward/Where Else Can I Go"	I. Houghton; Mohede; Sanchez	08:50
7.	"You Have Me/You Hold My World" (Feat. Michael Gungor)	I. Houghton; Lisa Gungor; Michael Gungor; Lindsey; Tommy Sims; Brad Waller	07:04
8.	"To Make You Feel My Love/Name Of Love" (Feat. Mariah Houghton)	I. Houghton; Bob Dylan; Lindsey; Sims	05:58
9.	"It's Not Over (When God Is In It) [Studio Version]" (Feat. James Fortune & Jason Nelson)	I. Houghton; Lindsey; Sanchez	06:37
10.	"Jesus At The Center [Studio Version]"	I. Houghton; Massey; Ranney	04:24
11.	"Your Presence Is Heaven [Studio Version]"	I. Houghton; Massey	04:59
Total length:			138:34

== Charts ==
Chart (2009)	Peak position
US Billboard 200	32
US Top Christian Albums (Billboard)	1
US Top Gospel Albums (Billboard)	2
US Digital Albums (Billboard)	16
