= Jesús En El Centro: En Vivo =

Live album by Israel & New Breed
- Released: April 21, 2013
- Recorded: 2012
- Genre: Worship; Latin Christian music
- Length: 74:49
- Language: Spanish
- Label: Integrity; Columbia

Israel & New Breed chronology
Jesus at the Center: Live (2012)	Jesús En El Centro: En Vivo (2013)	Covered: Alive in Asia (2015)

Jesús En El Centro: En Vivo is the first live album recorded in Spanish and performed by Israel & New Breed. The album Jesús En El Centro: En Vivo was re-recorded in Spanish from the album Jesus at the Center: Live and was released by Integrity and Columbia. Jesús En El Centro: En Vivo is the second album in Spanish by Israel & New Breed. This album was recorded live at Lakewood Church in early April 21, 2013.

== Track listing ==
NOTE: These songs are Spanish-language translations of Israel & New Breed songs in English. The original English-language song is listed next to each title.

Jesús En El Centro: En Vivo
No.	Title	Writer(s)	Worship leader(s)	Length
1.	"Jesús El Mismo (Jesus the Same)"	Israel Houghton & Aaron Lindsey	Israel & New Breed	05:23
2.	"Poder De Tu Victoria (Rez Power)"	Israel Houghton & Jeremiah Woods	Israel & New Breed (featuring Coalo Zamorano)	04:44
3.	"No Hay Vuelta Atrás (No Turning Back)"	Israel Houghton & Lindsey	Israel & New Breed (featuring Coalo Zamorano & Funky)	05:50
4.	"Te Amo"	Israel Houghton, Meleasa Houghton, Aaron Lindsey, Ricardo Sanchez & Rene "M.C. TBone" Sotomayor	Israel & New Breed (featuring T-Bone)	04:53
5.	"Nada Me Faltará (More Than Enough)"	Israel Houghton & Kelley Steele	Israel & New Breed (featuring Lucía Parker)	04:19
6.	"Te Llamo Cristo (I Call You Jesus)"	Israel Houghton & Joth Hunt	Israel & New Breed	05:38
7.	"Jesús En El Centro (Jesus at the Center)"	Israel Houghton, Micah Massey & Adam Ranney	Israel & New Breed	06:42
8.	"No Hay Palabras (Speechless)"	Israel Houghton, & Adam Ranney	Israel & New Breed (featuring Lucía Parker)	06:11
9.	"Tu Presencia Es El Cielo (Your Presence Is Heaven)"	Israel Houghton & Micah Massey	Israel & New Breed	08:30
10.	"Más Y Más (More and More)"	Doug Enquist, Israel Houghton, Amante Lacey, Scharita Lacey & BJ Putnam	Israel & New Breed (featuring Danilo Montero)	09:49
11.	"Medley: Hosanna/Te Seguiré Siempre (Hosanna/Moving Forward/Where Else Can I Go)"	Israel Houghton, Sidney Mohede & Ricardo Sanchez	Israel & New Breed	07:19
12.	"Jesús En El Centro [Versión Radio] (Jesus at the Center [Studio Version])"	Israel Houghton, Micah Massey & Adam Ranney	Israel & New Breed	04:32
Total length:				74:49

== Personnel ==
Adapted from AllMusic.

- Israel & New Breed – Primary Artist, vocals
- Israel Houghton – Composer, vocals
- Danilo Montero – Featured Artist, vocals
- Lucía Parker – Featured Artist, vocals
- Coalo Zamorano – Featured Artist, vocals
- Funky – Featured Artist, vocals
- Meleasa Houghton – Composer
- Doug Enquist – Composer
- Joth Hunt – Composer
- Armante Lacey – Composer
- Scharita Lacey – Composer
- Aaron Lindsey – Composer
- Micah Massey – Composer
- Sidney Mohede – Composer
- BJ Putnam – Composer
- Adam Ranney – Composer
- Ricardo Sanchez – Composer
- Rene "M.C. T-Bone" Sotomayor – Composer
- Kelly Steele – Composer
- Jeremiah Woods – Composer

== Chart performance ==
Chart (2012)	Peak position
US Latin Pop Albums (Billboard)	11
US Top Gospel Albums (Billboard)	16
US Top Latin Albums (Billboard)	23
US Top Christian Albums (Billboard)	48
