= Cindy Cruse-Ratcliff =

American singer

- Also known as: Cindy Cruse-Ratcliff
- Born: Cindy Lerae Cruse; May 18, 1963 (age 63); Odessa, Texas
- Origin: Tyler, Texas
- Genres: Gospel, Christian
- Occupations: Lakewood Church, Senior worship leader, singer, songwriter
- Instrument: Vocals
- Label: Lakewood
- Website: www.cindyratcliff.com

Cindy Lerae Cruse-Ratcliff (born May 18, 1963) is a singer-songwriter who serves as the senior worship leader at the Lakewood Church in Houston, Texas.

== Early life ==
Cruse was born, Cindy Lerae Cruse, on May 18, 1963, in Odessa, Texas while she grew up in Tyler, Texas,

== Music career ==
Cruse began ministering at the age of six alongside her family, The Cruse Family, a well-known evangelistic musical group. The group, popular throughout much of the 1970s and early 1980s, traveled and ministered all across the world. They released 25 albums and received two Dove Awards.

While Cruse said she always had a heart for music ministry, she would not become involved with worship music herself until later in life.

At the age of nine, she became the youngest licensed ASCAP songwriter. Since that time, she has written for and produced more than 100 album recordings.

In the late 1980s and early 1990s, Cruse recorded two Christian album-oriented rock/melodic rock albums entitled The Edge and Small Town Girl. Her husband at the time, contemporary Christian Music artist, Tim Miner served as executive producer for Small Town Girl.

From 1997 to 1998, she traveled with Revival Ministries International leading worship for evangelistic crusades in the United States and abroad. In late 1998, she moved to Covenant Church in Carrollton, Texas, serving as one of three worship leaders.

In January 2000, she received a phone call from Lakewood Church Pastor Joel Osteen, who offered her the opportunity to become the church's worship director. She was Osteen's first hire when he became the new pastor of Lakewood. While Cruse said she and her husband did not initially feel drawn to the church, they quickly fell in love with the people and moved to Houston.

Today, Cruse leads weekend worship services at Lakewood Church alongside Steve Crawford and Da'dra Crawford Greathouse, former members of the Contemporary Christian music duo Anointed.

In May 2010, Cruse released her first studio album in over ten years, 23. The album features 12 original songs including "Shout it Out Loud", "Living in Me", "Hurricane", and more.

== Personal life ==
Cruse lives in Houston, Texas and is married to Marcus Ratcliff, whom she met while working at Covenant Church. The two have a son named Windsor. On July 17, 2008, the couple adopted twins after trying to have children. After taking a leave from the church, she returned on Saturday, September 27, 2008 and told the congregation her testimony about the adoption of the twins. She also introduced "Lord Of All"—a new song she wrote with her nephew Ryan Cruse.

Cruse is the daughter of Joe and Nancy Cruse, and is one of five children. Her siblings, Jane Cruse Bearden, Dr. John Cruse, Joe Cruse III and Karen Cruse Adams are all involved in full-time Christian ministry.

== Discography ==
Cruse

- Released: 1982
- Format: Cassette, CD
- Label: Nissi

Cruse 2

- Released: 1984
- Format: Cassette, CD
- Label: Nissi

The Edge

- Released: 1989
- Format: Cassette, CD
- Label: Nissi

Small Town Girl

- Released: January 1, 1991
- Format: Cassette, CD
- Label: Frontline
- Producer: Tim Miner, Cindy Cruse

Lakewood Live: We Speak to Nations

- Released: May 28, 2002
- Format: CD
- Label: Integrity

Lakewood Live: Cover the Earth

- Released: February 10, 2004
- Format: CD
- Label: Integrity

The Gift

- Released: October 15, 2006
- Format: CD
- Label: Lakewood Music

Free to Worship

- Released: October 15, 2007
- Format: CD
- Label: Lakewood Music

23

- Released: May 7, 2010
- Format: CD
- Label: RPM Music

Heaven Raining Down

- Released: April 15, 2014
- Format: CD
- Label: Dream

Lluvia Celestial

- Released: January 20, 2015
- Format: Digital
- Label: Dream

Your Word

- Released: November 20, 2015
- Format: Digital
- Label: Impeccable Music Group
- Producer: Billy Dorsey, co-producers: Ron Charlton, Paul Yuen, JD Karpicke, and Telford Birmingham II

Compilations

- "Even Now" from John Jacobs and the Power Team (Frontline, 1990)
- "I Lift Up My Hands" from New Season (Integrity, 2001)
- "I Will Sing of Your Love" from Amazing God (Maranatha, 2003)
- "Lord I Seek You" from Amazing God (Maranatha, 2003)
- "Agnus Dei" from When Women Worship (Miami Life Sounds, 2007)
- "Always Welcome" from When Women Worship (Miami Life Sounds, 2007)
- "Great Grace" from When Women Worship (Miami Life Sounds, 2007)
- "I Open My Heart" from When Women Worship (Miami Life Sounds, 2007)
- "Thirst For You" from When Women Worship (Miami Life Sounds, 2007)
- "When I Find Him" from When Women Worship (Miami Life Sounds, 2007)
