= The Power of One (album) =

Studio album by Israel Houghton
- Released: March 24, 2009
- Recorded: 2008–2009
- Genre: Contemporary worship
- Length: 73:04
- Label: Integrity Media/Columbia

Israel Houghton chronology
A Deeper Level (2007)	The Power of One (2009)	Love God, Love People (2010)

The Power of One is a contemporary worship studio album recorded and performed by Israel Houghton. The album is released by Israel as a solo project, outside of Israel & New Breed. The disc features performances from tobyMac, Mary Mary, Martin Smith of Delirious?, and Chevelle Franklyn.

== Critical reception ==
Professional ratings
Review scores
Source	Rating
AllMusic (Jared Johnson)	4/5 stars
Alpha Omega News (Ken Wiegman)	B+
Christianity Today (Andree Farias)	4/5 stars
Cross Rhythms (Paul Kerslake)	10/10 stars
Jesus Freak Hideout (Roger Gelwicks)	3/5 stars
Louder Than the Music (Jono Davies)	4/5 stars
New Release Tuesday (Kevin McNeese)	5/5 stars
The Phantom Tollbooth (Trish Cooper)	4/5 stars

AllMusic's Jared Johnson said that "The man who reinvented contemporary gospel has reinvented himself as a solo artist on this breakthrough debut, and the result is so unbelievable that even his biggest fans may not recognize the magnitude of his talents until experiencing it for themselves." In addition, Johnson wrote that "The theme of social consciousness is not new to gospel music, and yet Houghton is able to make it sound so fresh and so infectious that it practically stops you in your tracks, forcing you to sit down and examine new ways to make a difference in the world. Not very many artists have the ability to make such calls to action. And it's that self-examination that Houghton uses to power each masterful track."

Alpha Omega News' Ken Wiegman said that "The Power of One, is no less remarkable and moving. The varieties of musical styles are commanding and the message is as powerful. The music ranges anywhere from gospel choir to reggae, funk and rock. The message is a call to action and a call to worship."

Christianity Today's Andree Farias said that "The Power of One is so unlike anything Houghton has done before. For the first time ever, he appears to be veering from his calling to serve the church with new songs to sing. Instead, Israel appears to be going for a ministry platform looking at how social justice and worship intersect." Furthermore, Farias wrote that "The Power of One is more message-driven than it is corporate", and "The Power of One serves as a nice reprieve for him to try his hand at something else." Farias finished with saying that with the album "...most eclectic listeners won't mind. When music and musicianship are this worshipful, virtuoso, and varied, it's easy to get caught up, kick back, and join the praise. Israel has done it again."

Cross Rhythms' Paul Kerslake said called the album an "ambitious set [that] is an inventive fusion of rock, funk, gospel, reggae and pretty much everything in between. Israel rips through the 14 tracks here and sounds like he's having a blast. it's hard to listen to this album without a smile. The lyrical theme flowing through the record (and also illustrated in the accompanying booklet) is that we all have the power to make a difference." Also, Kerslake noted the album for being a "spectacular progression". Kerslake wrote that he has "had it on constant rotation since I got it. This is the sound of an artist at the peak of his talent, this is a great album, a must have and deserves to be recognised as a classic though it will be intriguing to see what the church goers expecting neo-gospel live worship will make of this boldly inventive project."

Jesus Freak Hideout Roger Gelwicks said that "Worship albums can be curious things: they can either be amazing and groundbreaking, or they can be unoriginal and irritatingly dull. Israel Houghton's The Power of One, however, doesn't seem to want to fit into either category, leaving listeners with a mixed result." In concluding, Gelwicks wrote that "Israel Houghton had a good thing going, but the entire album could have been improved if he majored on the uniqueness factor and made it a constant theme. For what he has produced, though, it's slightly better than some worship records today, and some will come to find much to like here, but The Power of One turns out to be a merely average effort that doesn't warrant too much extra attention."

Louder Than the Music's Jono Davies noted that "The lyrics of many of the songs deal with issues of injustice, poverty and suffering." Davies ended with a question, which "Is this the gospel album of the year? Yes."

New Release Tuesday's Kevin McNeese told that "The Power Of One is his career defining album, containing incredibly anointed choruses of praise, and I haven't been able to put it down all year."

The Phantom Tollbooth's Trish Cooper said that "This is one great CD!" In addition, Cooper wrote that the album "Featured are songs of hope, revelation, redemption, and social justice. This one is a great mix for fans of all music! There is something for everyone!"

== Track listing ==
No.	Title	Writer(s)	Length
1.	"My Name Iz"	Sonny Boy	0:40
2.	"Everywhere That I Go"	Israel Houghton, Cindy Ratcliff	4:39
3.	"Just Wanna Say"	Houghton, Aaron Lindsey, Tommy Sims	3:47
4.	"Surely Goodness" (featuring Chevelle Franklyn)	Houghton, Lindsey, Sims, Franklyn	4:35
5.	"The Power of One (Change the World)"	Houghton, Ricardo Sanchez	5:49
6.	"U R Loved"	Houghton, Lindsey, Sims, Akil Thompson	4:55
7.	"Moving Forward"	Houghton, Sanchez	4:51
8.	"I Receive"	Houghton, Peter Wilson	6:43
9.	"Saved By Grace"	Houghton, Lindsey, Daniel Johnson	7:01
10.	"Every Prayer" (featuring Mary Mary)	Houghton, Lindsey, Sanchez, Dayna Caddell	5:11
11.	"Sing Redemption's Song" (featuring Martin Smith)	Houghton, Sims	5:37
12.	"Better to Believe"	Sims	2:59
13.	"You Found Me" (featuring tobyMac)	Houghton, Lindsey, Meleasa Houghton, Toby McKeehan	5:22
14.	"My Tribute Medley"	Ed Cash, Andraé Crouch, Jesse Reeves, Chris Tomlin	4:15
Total length:			73:04

iTunes pre-order
No.	Title	Writer(s)	Length
15.	"Others"	Houghton	6:46
Total length:			79:50

== Personnel ==
=== Band ===
- Israel Houghton - Lead Vocals, Fender Rhodes, Acoustic Guitar, Piano, Background Vocals
- Aaron Lindsey - Hammond B3, Keyboards, Hammond Organ, Piano, Programming, Sampling, String Samples, Background Vocals
- Jonathan Dubose Jr. - Guitars
- Tommy Sims - Bass, Programming, Background Vocals
- Javier Solis - Percussion, Tambourine
- Akil Thompson - Drums, Guitars
- Mark Townsend - Keyboards, Programming
- Calvin Rogers - Drums
- Jerry McPherson - Guitar
- Joel Camey - Bass
- Lamar Carter - Drums
- Michael Hodge - Electric Guitar
- Tracy Silverman - Strings
- Dan Needham - Drums, Percussion
- Doug Moffett, Vinnie Ciesielski, Barry Green - Horns

=== Background Vocals ===
- Bethany Chamberlin
- Christabelle Clack
- Steve Crawford
- Chevelle Franklyn
- Da'dra Crawford-Greathouse
- Missi Hale
- Krystle Harper
- Daniel Johnson
- Terrence Jones
- Michael Mellet
- LeAnne Palmore
- Martin Smith
- Liz Vaughn
- Jerard Woods
- Jovaun Woods

== Awards ==
In 2010, the album was awarded a Grammy for Best Pop/Contemporary Gospel Album at the 52nd Grammy Awards. The title song also won a Dove Award for Contemporary Gospel Recorded Song of the Year at the 41st GMA Dove Awards.

== Charts ==
Chart (2009)	Peak position
US Billboard 200	34
US Top Christian Albums (Billboard)	1
US Top Gospel Albums (Billboard)	1
US Digital Albums (Billboard)	34
