= Alive in South Africa =

Alive In South Africa

Live album by Israel & New Breed
- Released: October 25, 2005
- Recorded: August 20, 2005
- Venue: Cape Town, South Africa
- Genre: Christian
- Length: 2:08:19
- Label: Integrity Music

Israel & New Breed chronology
Live From Another Level (2004)	Alive In South Africa (2005)	A Timeless Christmas (2006)

Professional ratings
Review scores
Source	Rating
AllMusic	4.5/5 stars
Christianity Today	4/5 stars

Alive In South Africa is a live worship album by Israel & New Breed. Recorded on August 20, 2005 in Cape Town, South Africa, the disc was released on October 25, 2005 by Integrity Music. It is the fifth album by Israel, his fourth released by Integrity, and his third live album and serves as the follow-up to his 2004 album Live from Another Level.

== Track listing ==
=== Disc 1 ===
1. Intro- 2:07
2. Alive Overture- 1:14
3. Alive- 4:10
4. Favor of the Lord- 3:53
5. Favor of the Lord (Reprise)- 3:11
6. Turn It Around- 5:31
7. Not Forgotten- 5:58
8. Not Forgotten (Reprise)- 3:19
9. Not Forgotten (Slow Version)/He Knows My Name- 2:29
10. Take the Limits Off- 2:00
11. Take the Limits Off/No Limits (Enlarge My Territory)- 8:41
12. Bishop Tudor Bismark (Speaking)- 2:56
13. It's Raining- 7:43
14. Surely- 4:54

=== Disc 2 ===
1. Intro- 0:25
2. Still Standing- 6:35
3. I Will- 4:46
4. African Skies (Instrumental)- 1:17
5. You've Been A Friend- 4:50
6. To Worship You I Live (Away)- 6:53
7. Worship Medley- 5:41
8. Alpha and Omega- 8:00 (written and composed by Erasmus Mutambira)
9. Jonathan Butler Intro- 1:52
10. Come and Let Us Sing (Featuring Jonathan Butler)- 7:31
11. New Season- 2:49
12. Your Latter Will Be Greater- 1:53
13. You Are Good- 1:43
14. Again I Say Rejoice- 1:12
15. Friend of God- 4:46
16. He Knows My Name (Bonus Cut)- 4:09
17. Not Forgotten (Radio Version – Bonus Cut)- 5:51

== Personnel ==
=== Band ===
- Aaron Lindsey - Fender Rhodes, Piano, Hammond Organ, Programming
- Arthur Strong - Fender Rhodes, Piano, Hammond Organ
- Jerry Harris Jr. - Keyboards
- Johnny Najara, Eric Brice - Guitar
- Terrance Palmer - Bass
- Michael Clemons - Drums
- Tony Paco, Javier Solis - Percussion
- Mike Haynes, Vaughn Fransch - Trumpet
- Mark Douthit, Marc DeKock - Saxophone
- Barry Green, Kelly Bell - Trombone

=== New Breed (Background Vocals) ===
- Olanrewaju Agbabiaka
- Dakri Brown
- Mattie Calloway
- Ryan Edgar
- Daniel Johnson
- Stacey Joseph
- Melanie Scott
- Danielle Stephens
- Jamil Whiting

== Charts ==
Country	Chart (2005)	Peak position
United States of America	Billboard 200	62
United States of America	Christian Albums	3
United States of America	Gospel Albums	2

== Awards ==
Grammy Awards

Year	Nominee / work	Award	Result
2007	Alive In South Africa	Best Traditional Gospel Album	Won
2007	"Not Forgotten"	Best Gospel Song	Nominated

GMA Dove Awards

Year	Nominee / work	Award	Result
2006	Alive In South Africa	Praise & Worship Album of the Year	Nominated
2006	"Friend of God"	Song of the Year	Nominated
2006	"Not Forgotten"	Contemporary Gospel Recorded Song of the Year	Won
2007	Alive In South Africa	Long Form Music Video of the Year	Nominated
2007	"Turn It Around"	Contemporary Gospel Recorded Song of the Year	Won
