= Amazing God =

Live album by Marcos Witt
- Released: May 27, 2003
- Recorded: Lakewood Church in Houston, Texas
- Genre: Gospel & Religious
- Length: 61:21
- Label: CanZion
- Producer: Coalo Zamorano

Marcos Witt chronology
Dios de Pactos (2003)	Amazing God (2003)	Recordando Otra Vez (2004)

Professional ratings
Review scores
Source	Rating
Cross Rhythms	(6/10)

Amazing God is the twenty-fifth album released by Christian singer Marcos Witt. The album was recorded live from Houston, Texas. This was Witt's first English language album recorded.

== Track listing ==
1. "All Out" — 03:53
2. "You Reign" — 04:37
3. "Amazing God" — 07:54
4. "Our God Is Lord of All" — 03:47
5. "Bigger Than My Imagination" (Featuring Michael Gungor) — 06:01
6. "Lord I Seek You" (Featuring Cindy Cruse-Ratcliff) — 03:53
7. "I Will Sing of Your Love" (Featuring Cindy Cruse-Ratcliff) — 05:55
8. "Thank You" — 03:21
9. "Aleluya to Our God" — 06:25
10. "Our God Is Lord of All" (Bonus Track) — 03:34
11. "Lord I Seek You" (Bonus Track) — 03:55
12. "I Will Sing, I Will Dance" (Bonus Track) — 04:38
13. "Jesús Es El Señor" (Bonus Track) — 03:33

== Credits ==
Producers:

- Juan Salinas
- Coalo Zamorano

Executive Producer:

- Marcos Witt

Arrangers:

- Emmanuel Espinosa
- Holger Fath
- Coalo Zamorano

Worship Leader:

- Marcos Witt

=== Musicians ===
- Randall Gonzalez - drums
- Coalo Zamorano - drums, acoustic guitar, synthesizer programming
- Holger Fath - drums, electric guitar, synthesizer programming
- Emmanuel Espinosa - bass, drums, synthesizer programming
- Allan Villatoro - keyboards, piano
- The Nashville string machine - strings

Background Vocals:

- Karen Adams
- Dakri Brown
- Michael Gungor
- Cindy Cruse-Ratcliff
- Coalo Zamorano
- Lorena Zamorano

Engineer:

- Orlando Rodriguez - engineer, mixing
- Héctor Sotelo - cover design
- Juan Salinas - translation
- Coalo Zamorano - translation
