= Covered: Alive in Asia =

Live album by Israel & New Breed
- Released: July 24, 2015
- Genre: Worship
- Length: 102:57
- Label: RCA Inspiration
- Producer: Israel Houghton & Kevin Camp

Israel & New Breed chronology
| Jesús En El Centro: En Vivo (2012) | Covered: Alive in Asia (2015) |

Covered: Alive in Asia is a live album by Israel & New Breed. RCA Inspiration released the album on July 24, 2015. Israel & New Breed worked with Chris Baker, Kevin Camp, and Aaron Lindsey, in the production of this album. The album was recorded all over Asia in early October 2014 in Singapore, Malaysia, Philippines, Indonesia, Japan, and South Korea during a tour.

== Critical reception ==
Professional ratings
Review scores
| Source | Rating |
|---|---|
| Cross Rhythms | 6/10 squares |
| New Release Today | 4.5/5 stars |
| Worship Leader | 5/5 stars |

Awarding the album five stars from Worship Leader, Jeremy Armstrong states, "Covered is a devotional fine art." Dwayne Lacy, giving the album four and a half stars at New Release Today, writes, "This album has so many highlights, crazy licks,...powerful moments and declarations." Rating the album a six out of ten for Cross Rhythms, Matt McChlery says, "It is just a pity that this recording has missed an opportunity to explore cross-cultural worship in a new way."

== Awards and accolades ==
This album was No. 2, on the Worship Leader's Top 20 Albums of 2015 list. At the 58th Annual Grammy Awards, it received the award for Best Gospel Album.

== Track listing ==
Track list
| No. | Title | Writer(s) | Length |
|---|---|---|---|
| 1. | "Intro (Kau Rajaku)" | Sari Simorangkir | 00:31 |
| 2. | "Thank You Lord" (feat. BJ Putnam) | Israel Houghton/Aaron Lindsey & Meleasa Houghton | 08:03 |
| 3. | "Risen" | Israel Houghton/Joshua Dufrene & David Binion | 05:39 |
| 4. | "My Strength" | Israel Houghton/Aaron Lindsey/Martha Munizzi/Danielle Munizzi & Matt Edwards | 05:05 |
| 5. | "Chasing Me Down" (Feat. Tye Tribbett) | Aaron Lindsey/Meleasa Houghton & Israel Houghton | 06:13 |
| 6. | "Our God Reigns" (Feat. BJ Putnam) | BJ Putnam & Israel Houghton | 06:03 |
| 7. | "In Jesus Name" | Israel Houghton & Darlene Zschech | 06:25 |
| 8. | "I Will Live" | Israel Houghton & Aaron Lindsey | 07:22 |
| 9. | "One Thing Remains" | Brian Johnson/Christa Black Gifford & Jeremy Riddle | 07:13 |
| 10. | "Covered" | Israel Houghton & Joth Hunt | 07:40 |
| 11. | "Breathe Your Name" | Israel Houghton/Ricardo Sanchez & Obe Brown | 10:28 |
| 12. | "Already Done" (Feat. Jonathan McReynolds) | Israel Houghton/Abner Ramirez & Brian Brown | 07:03 |
| 13. | "First Loved Me" (Feat. Charlin Neal) | Israel Houghton/Joshua Dufrene & David Binion | 07:59 |
| 14. | "I Am Loved" | David Binion/Reba Rambo & Dony McGuire | 04:49 |
| 15. | "Mighty to Save" | Ben Fielding & Reuben Morgan | 07:30 |
| 16. | "How Awesome Is Our God" (Feat. Yolanda Adams) | Israel Houghton/Neville Diedericks & Meleasa Houghton | 05:10 |
| Total length: | | | 102:58 |

== Charts ==
| Chart (2015) | Peak position |
|---|---|
| US Top Christian Albums (Billboard) | 1 |
| US Top Gospel Albums (Billboard) | 1 |
| US Billboard 200 | 47 |
