= Ghosts Upon the Earth =

Studio album by Gungor
- Released: September 20, 2011
- Genre: Contemporary Christian music
- Label: Brash

Gungor chronology
Beautiful Things (2010)	Ghosts Upon the Earth (2011)	I Am Mountain (2013)

Ghosts Upon the Earth is the second album by Christian band Gungor and the seventh album self-produced by singer Michael Gungor. This album received a nomination at 54th Grammy Awards for Best Contemporary Christian Music Album.

The tracks "Let There Be" and "Every Breath" feature the St. John's Boys' Choir under the direction of Andre Heywood.

Professional ratings
Review scores
Source	Rating
AllMusic	4/5 stars
Christian Music Zine	4.5/5 stars
Jesus Freak Hideout	4.5/5 stars

== Track listing ==
1. "Let There Be"
2. "Brother Moon"
3. "Crags and Clay"
4. "The Fall"
5. "When Death Dies"
6. "Church Bells"
7. "Wake Up Sleeper"
8. "Ezekiel"
9. "Vous Êtes Mon Cœur (You Are My Heart)"
10. "This Is Not the End"
11. "You Are the Beauty"
12. "Every Breath"
