= The Grascals (album) =

Studio album by The Grascals
- Released: February 8, 2005
- Genre: Bluegrass
- Length: 38:44
- Label: Rounder Records

The Grascals chronology
The Grascals (2005)	Long List of Heartaches (2006)

The Grascals is the debut album of the American bluegrass music group The Grascals, released by Rounder Records in early 2005. Dolly Parton does a guest spot on the song "Viva Las Vegas". This album also launched The Grascals career, winning them Song of the Year and Emerging Artist of the Year. Also, winning them a nomination for Album of the year. This album also earned them a Grammy nomination in Best Bluegrass Album of the Year, losing to the Del McCoury Band. This album also debuted at number 3 on the Billboard Bluegrass Charts.

== Track listing ==
1. Leavin's Heavy on My Mind (2:45)
2. Mourning Dove (2:29)
3. Me and John and Paul (3:12)
4. Bevans Lake Crossing (2:48)
5. Some Things I Want to Sing About (2:32)
6. Teardrops in My Eyes (3:00)
7. Where I Come From (2:58)
8. My Saro Jane (2:31)
9. Where Corn Don't Grow (3:44)
10. Sally Goodin (3:49)
11. Lonely Street (2:29)
12. Viva Las Vegas (with Dolly Parton) (3:11)
13. Sweet By and By (3:16)

== Personnel ==
Terry Eldredge - Guitar, vocals
Jamie Johnson - Guitar, vocals
Dave Talbot - Banjo, backing vocals
Terry Smith - Bass, backing vocals
Danny Roberts - Mandolin
Jimmy Mattingly - Fiddle
Dolly Parton - Vocals (on "Viva Las Vegas")
Lloyd Green - Steel guitar (on "Me and John and Paul")
Bob Mater - Drums, Percussion

== Other information ==
- Dolly Parton calls this album "One of the greatest albums I've ever listened to."
- The Grascals won the IBMA award for song of the year in 2005 for their song "Me and John and Paul".
- The song Sally Goodin is a regular at The Grascals shows.
- Two singles were released off the album, being their cover of "Viva Las Vegas" with special guest Dolly Parton, and "Me and John and Paul", which was written by Harley Allen.
