= Dios de Pactos =

Live album by Marcos Witt
- Released: 2003
- Recorded: May 21, 2002 at Miami Arena in Miami, Florida
- Genre: Gospel & Religious
- Length: 77:09
- Label: CanZion; Sony Discos
- Producer: Marcos Witt and Juan Salinas

Marcos Witt chronology
Lo Mejor de Marcos III (2003)	Dios de Pactos (2003)	Amazing God (2003)

Professional ratings
Review scores
Source	Rating
Cross Rhythms	7/10 stars

Dios de Pactos is the twenty-fourth album released by Christian singer Marcos Witt. The album was recorded live in Miami, Florida. The self-titled single from the album was the winner of the "Song of the Year" category at the 2004 Arpa Awards.

== Track listing ==
• 01. — "Narración: La Búsqueda" — 00:17

• 02. — "Yo Te Busco" (Feat. Jonathan Witt) (David Bell) – 03:32

• 03. — "Obertura Para Piano Y Orquestra (Narración: Al Piano En Su Presencia)" — 03:54

• 04. — "Aquí Estoy Otra Vez" (Marcos Witt) — 05:22

• 05. — "Narración: Salmo 100:4" — 01:00

• 06. — "Oh Gracias, Encontre La Vida" (Steven C. Barr, Emmanuel Espinosa, Juan Salinas, Witt) — 05:42

• 07. — "Narración: Altar De Bronze" — 00:12

• 08. — "Vivifícame" (Feat. Ray Alonso) (Espinosa, Salinas, Witt) — 04:25

• 09. — "Narración: El Lavacro" — 00:53

• 10. — "Lávame" (Barr, Espinosa, Salinas, Witt) — 03:51

• 11. — "Sólo Por Tú Sangre" (Barr) — 06:41

• 12. — "Narración: El Lugar Santo" — 00:33

• 13. — "Mi Pan, Mi Luz" (Barr, Espinosa, Salinas, Witt) — 05:26

• 14. — "Amarte Más" (Witt) — 04:08

• 15. — "Narración: El Lugar Santísmo" — 00:35

• 16. — "Dios De Pactos" (Barr, Espinosa, Salinas, Witt) — 10:52

• 17. — "Narración: La Celebración" — 01:43

• 18. — "Celebraré, Me Alegraré" (Espinosa, Salinas, Witt) — 04:17

• 19. — "Al Rey" (Barr, Espinosa, Salinas, Witt) — 05:42

• 20. — "La Batucada, Reprise: Al Rey" (Barr, Espinosa, Salinas, Witt) — 04:13

• 21. — "Yo Te Busco" (Bell) — 03:58 (Bonus Track)

== Personnel ==
- David Angell – violin
- Wiso Aponte – guitar
- Janet Askey – violin
- Edward Benitez – trombone
- Oswaldo Burruel – acoustic guitar
- CanZion – executive producer
- David Davidson – violin
- Ray Alonso DelaBanda – rap
- Connie Ellison – violin
- Isaac Escamilla – piano, arranger
- Jane Escueta – violin
- Emmanuel Espinosa – bass
- Holger Fath – guitar, arranger
- Luis Fernandez – violin
- Jason Fite – viola,
- Efrain Garcia – cover design
- Juan Manuel García – photography
- Randall Gonzalez – drums
- Carl Gorodetzky – violin
- Lari Goss – arranger
- Jim Gray – orchestra director
- Jim Grosjean – viola
- Lari Gross – arranger
- Jack Jazioro – double bass
- Brent Kent – recording
- Jennifer Kummer – corno D
- Anthony LaMarchina – cello
- Lee Larrison – violin
- Bobby López – trumpet
- Esteban López – arranger, drum arrangements
- Jim Lotz – bassoon
- Ken Love – mastering
- Bob Mason – cello
- Margaret Mason – cello, viola
- Blair Masters – arranger
- Chris McDonald – arranger, transcription, orchestra director
- Cate Mier – violin
- Craig Nelson – double bass
- Leslie Norton – corno D
- Kathryn Plummer – viola
- Carole Rabinowitz-Neuen – cello
- Ann Richards – flute
- Orlando Rodriguez – engineer, mixing, audio supervisor, audio engineer
- Ruddy Rodriguez – saxophone
- Juan Salinas – producer
- Ruth Gabriela Salinas – photography
- Jorge Santos – engineer, recording
- Pamela Sixfin – violin
- Julie Tanner – cello
- Bobby G. Taylor – oboe
- Nolita Theo – vocals
- Dick Tunney – arranger, producer, orchestra director, orchestra production
- Catherine Umstead – violin
- Esteban Vázquez – arranger
- Allan Villatoro – keyboards
- Karen Winkelman – Violin
- Marcos Witt – piano, director, orchestra, producer, liner notes
- Coalo Zamorano – vocals
- Lorena Zamorano – vocals

== Awards and nominations ==
In addition to the song Dios de Pactos winning the "Song of the Year" category at the 2004 Arpa Awards, the album also garnered other nominations such as "Album of the Year", "Producer of the Year" and "Best Male Vocalist Album". At the AMCL Awards, the album garnered special recognition as "Excellent Production of the Year".
