= Hazel Smith =

American journalist (1934–2018)

- Born: Hazel Ruth Boone; May 31, 1934; Caswell County, North Carolina, US
- Died: March 18, 2018 (aged 83); Madison, Tennessee, US
- Occupation(s): Publicist, journalist, singer, songwriter, television and radio show host, cookbook author
- Known for: Coining the term "outlaw country"
- Spouse: Patrick Smith (divorced)
- Children: Billy Smith; Terry Smith

Hazel Ruth Boone, also known as Hazel Smith (May 31, 1934 – March 18, 2018) was an American country music journalist, publicist, singer-songwriter, television and radio show host, and cookbook author. She is sometimes credited with creating the term "outlaw country," which has been used to describe country music by performers including Tompall & the Glaser Brothers, Waylon Jennings and Willie Nelson.

Smith worked as a publicist for country musicians beginning in the late 1960s while simultaneously writing and recording her own music. She wrote columns about country music for several publications, and she hosted radio and television shows about country music, cooking, and film. She also published a cookbook called Hazel's Hot Dish in 2001.

== Personal life ==
Hazel Ruth Boone was born on May 31, 1934, in Caswell County, North Carolina, to parents who were farmers. Her father also spent some time working as the sheriff.

She worked for a hosiery mill and a tobacco company after she graduated from high school. When she was 19 she married Patrick Smith, a banjo and fiddle player. They had two sons together, Billy and Terry Smith, and they encouraged them to pursue music. The two went on to record together for Epic Records in 1990. Terry sang and played bass for the Osborne Brothers, and then became a founding member of the bluegrass band The Grascals.

Hazel and Patrick divorced, although she kept Smith as her surname. She then met Bill Monroe, a bluegrass musician, at a music festival, and the two began a relationship. His song "Walk Softly on This Heart of Mine", which became a Top 40 success when covered by The Kentucky Headhunters, was written about Smith.

In 1970, Smith and her sons moved to Nashville, Tennessee.

On March 18, 2018, Smith died in Madison, Tennessee, from heart failure.

== Career ==
After moving to Nashville in 1970, Smith began working as a publicist in Music Row. She first found work with Kinky Friedman, and went on to do publicity work for Tompall & the Glaser Brothers, Dr. Hook & the Medicine Show, Waylon Jennings, and Willie Nelson. When asked by a radio station to come up with a name for the style of musicians she represented, she gave the now-popular term "outlaw country". The 1976 album Wanted! The Outlaws, which featured music by Jennings, Nelson, Jessi Colter, and Tompall Glaser, helped popularize the term and draw fame for the musicians. It became the first country music album to become platinum-certified when it sold over one million copies.

Smith also worked as a journalist in the 1970s, writing a gossip column for Country Music magazine and contributing to Nash Country Weekly and Country Music Today. She also operated a country music news service for country radio stations, and became a popular radio personality. She is credited with contributing significantly to the success of artists including Garth Brooks and Brad Paisley through her journalism.

Smith also worked as a personal assistant for Ricky Skaggs and Sharon White, and she founded her own talent management company, Hazel & Heller. She wrote and performed her own music throughout her career, some of which was recorded by Dr. Hook & the Medicine Show, Bill Monroe, and Tammy Wynette.

In the 2000s, Smith began writing a weekly column called "Hot Dish" for CMT. She later worked with CMT to host a series called Southern Fried Flicks, which was a combined cooking and movie show that often included country musicians as guest stars. In 2001 she published a cookbook titled Hazel's Hot Dish: Cookin' with Country Stars, which included recipes from popular country musicians. After its publication, Smith made several appearances on The Ellen DeGeneres Show.
