= Bigger Than My Imagination =

Studio album by Michael Gungor
- Released: November 11, 2003
- Genre: Worship
- Label: Integrity Music, Vertical Music

Michael Gungor chronology
| Bigger Than My Imagination (2003) | Battle Cry: Worship from the Frontlines (2005) |

Professional ratings
Review scores
| Source | Rating |
|---|---|
| Christian Music Today | 4.5/5 stars |
| Cross Rhythms | 9/10 stars |

Bigger Than My Imagination is the debut album of contemporary worship musician Michael Gungor.

== Track listing ==
1. "Closest Friend"
2. "Friend of God"
3. "Bigger Than My Imagination"
4. "Move Me"
5. "Meet With Me"
6. "Waiting"
7. "I Am Yours"
8. "Little Kingdom"
9. "Lovely"
10. "Beautiful Face"
11. "Here I Am to Worship"
12. "It's Your Love"
13. "Doxology"
14. "Overwhelming"
15. "Friend of God" (reprise)

== Notes ==
- Israel Houghton – producer
- "Bigger Than My Imagination" was later included on the live worship album, Amazing God
