= Michael Gungor =

- Also known as: Gungor
- Born: September 14, 1980 (age 44); Wisconsin, U.S.
- Genres: Experimental, post-rock, folk, alternative, worship
- Years active: 1999–present
- Labels: Independent
- Website: gungormusic.com

Michael Gungor (born September 14, 1980) also known as Vishnu Dass, is an American singer-songwriter, producer, music editor, author, and podcast host. He led the musical collective Gungor, which received multiple Grammy nominations. The group's music has been compared to that of Sufjan Stevens, Bon Iver, and Arcade Fire. Aside from his work with the band, Michael Gungor has written and produced music for several other artists, and is a co-founder of the art collective The Liturgists.

== Music career ==
=== Early career ===
As early as 2002, Gungor began producing albums with his church, Resurrection Life Church in Grandville, near Grand Rapids, Michigan. The albums garnered the attention of Integrity Music, who signed Gungor for a solo album. In 2003, he released "Bigger Than My Imagination" under Integrity Media. The album included the single "Friend of God", a Dove Award-nominated song which Gungor wrote with gospel artist Israel Houghton. The album enjoyed some radio play.

In 2005, Gungor toured with Teen Mania's Acquire the Fire traveling youth rally event. In the same year, he and his wife Lisa released a live album titled Battle Cry: Worship from the Frontlines, through Integrity Media. Michael later retired most of the songs on this album, tweeting a link to his blog which is no longer online. The blog said that he no longer preferred to associate military imagery with Christian belief.

=== The Michael Gungor Band ===
In 2006, Michael Gungor parted ways with Integrity Music, seeking more creative control over his music. He then formed the Michael Gungor Band, consisting of himself on guitar and vocals, his wife Lisa on vocals, his brother David Gungor on bass, John Arndt on piano, Josh Eatmon on drums, and former Desperation Band member Michael Rossback as a guitarist and producer.

Michael Gungor rented a house down the road from his church in Grandville and turned it into a recording studio. It was there that Gungor and Rossback produced their 2007 release, All I Need is Here. It was Gungor's first independent project and was a great departure from the predictable CCM box of his two releases with Integrity. In 2008, the Michael Gungor Band signed with Brash Records. The label re-released their album in 2008 as Ancient Skies, omitting two songs and adding the upbeat rock opener "Say So", as well as a song sung by Lisa, "You Are The Light".

=== Gungor ===
After touring with his sophomore release, Michael Gungor renamed the group from "The Michael Gungor Band" to simply "Gungor" (styled as güngör). It reflected another change, both in the direction of his music and in the evolving number of band members. The first album release under the new name was Beautiful Things in 2010. The album was yet another departure from Gungor's old style, involving indie-folk instrumentation reminiscent of Sufjan Stevens and ambient soundscapes. The album featured a short gospel-blues jam featuring Israel Houghton titled "Heaven". In 2011, the album and its title track, "Beautiful Things", were nominated in the Grammy categories Best Rock or Rap Gospel Album and Best Gospel Song, respectively.

In 2011, Gungor released Ghosts Upon the Earth and followed it with a live album, A Creation Liturgy in 2012. The band's third studio album, I Am Mountain, was released on September 24, 2013. On October 24, 2013, the band began a 60-city headline tour across the U.S., Canada, Australia, New Zealand, and Europe.

Though Gungor's music is filled with Christian themes and language and is spiritual in nature, the collective has attempted to distance itself from being labeled simply a "Christian" band due to the problematic way the term is often used. Michael Gungor refers to Gungor as a collective because at any given time the group is composed of 3–10 members. He and his wife believe that their music transcends any one genre. Michael writes songs that are a mix of indie rock, post rock, prog, soft rock and more. When asked, he describes his style as "alternative, folk, textured and experimental." The group performed at SXSW 2014.

Gungor announced the end of their journey as a band in early 2019. The "End of the World" tour became their farewell tour.

=== The Liturgists ===
In 2014, Gungor, together with Michael's wife and sister, began collaborating with other artists and releasing music as "The Liturgists", which he calls "an experimental art collective". It is also the title of their podcast, which discusses topics through the lenses of science, art, and faith.

=== Writing ===
Michael Gungor published his first book The Crowd, the Critic and the Muse in 2012. In April 2019, he published his second book This. He is the host of a podcast which shares the name with a book, Loving This, exploring the spiritual themes of clinging and suffering.

== Personal life ==
Michael Gungor grew up in Marshfield southeast of Eau Claire, Wisconsin. He is the son of pastor and author Ed Gungor. Michael began writing and playing music at a young age. He studied jazz guitar at both Western Michigan University in Kalamazoo and the University of North Texas in Denton while also touring and working as a multi-instrumentalist musician. He met his wife Lisa at Oral Roberts University in Tulsa, Oklahoma during their first year of college. She later became his music partner and is the other primary vocalist and songwriter for Gungor.

Michael and Lisa live in Los Angeles with their two daughters, Amelie and Lucette. They wrote the song "Light" for their youngest daughter, born in May 2014, who has Down syndrome. In 2007, Michael and Lisa Gungor founded a non-denominational church community called Bloom, but have since dissociated themselves from the church.

== Discography ==
=== Michael Gungor ===
- Bigger Than My Imagination (November 11, 2003)
- Battle Cry: Worship from the Frontlines (October 4, 2005)

=== Michael Gungor Band ===
- Ancient Skies EP (March 24, 2006)
- All I Need Is Here (October 9, 2007)
- Ancient Skies (September 9, 2008)

=== Gungor ===
- Beautiful Things (February 16, 2010)
- Ghosts Upon the Earth (September 20, 2011)
- A Creation Liturgy (October 9, 2012)
- I Am Mountain (September 24, 2013)
- One Wild Life: Soul (August 7, 2015)
- O Christmas EP (November 27, 2015)
- One Wild Life: Spirit (March 25, 2016)
- One Wild Life: Body (September 30, 2016)

=== The Liturgists ===
- Vapor EP (February 28, 2014)
- Garden EP (April 8, 2014)
- God Our Mother EP (May 6, 2014)
- Pentecost EP (June 6, 2014)
- Oh Light (December 20, 2015)
- Holy Week (March 2016)

== Awards ==
- GMA Dove Awards 2008: "Say So" – Contemporary Gospel Recorded Song of the Year
- Independent Music Awards 2013: A Creation Liturgy (Live) – Best Live Performance Album

== Publications ==
- The Crowd, the Critic, and the Muse: A Book for Creators – (2012)
- This: Becoming Free – (2019)
