= Keep On Walkin' (album) =

Studio album by The Grascals
- Released: July 15, 2008
- Genre: Bluegrass
- Length: 37:47
- Label: Rounder
- Producer: The Grascals

The Grascals chronology
Long List of Heartaches (2006)	Keep On Walkin' (2008)	The Famous Lefty Flynn's (2010)

Keep On Walkin' is the third album released by the Grascals on July 15, 2008. The album is a variety of songs, either entirely new songs coming which have been introduced the song line up just a few months before the album, or songs that have been played for quite a while but never made previous cuts for albums.

== Track listing ==
Sources:

1. "Feeling Blue" (Aubrey Holt) – 2:36
2. "Sad Wind Sighs" (Holt) – 3:29
3. "Choices" (Billy Yates, Mike Curtis) – 3:10
4. "Only Daddy That'll Walk the Line" (Jimmy Bryant) – 2:18
5. "Indiana" (Harley Allen, Jamie Johnson)) – 3:05
6. "Rollin' in My Sweet Baby's Arms" (traditional) – 2:59
7. "Today I Started Loving You Again" (Merle Haggard, Bonnie Owens) – 3:26
8. "Can't You Hear That Whistle Blow" (Chris Dodson, Sonny Throckmorton) – 3:06
9. "Remembering" (Allen)) – 3:25
10. "Keep On Walkin'" (Charley Stefl, Johnson) – 3:22
11. "Happy Go Lucky" (Holt) – 2:50
12. "Farther Along" (traditional) – 4:11

== The Grascals ==
- Terry Eldrege - lead vocals, guitar
- Jamie Johnson - lead and harmony vocals
- Terry Smith - lead and harmony vocals, bass guitar
- Danny Roberts - mandolin; bass vocals on "Farther Along"
- Aaron McDaris - banjo, guitar; harmony vocals on "Keep On Walkin'"

=== Guest musicians ===
- Vince Gill - guest vocals on "Sad Wind Sighs"
- Andy Hall — dobro
- Jimmy Mattingly - fiddle
- Hargus "Pig" Robbins — piano
- Steve Turner — drums
- Kent Wells — rhythm guitar

== Chart performance ==
Chart (2008)	Peak position
U.S. Billboard Top Bluegrass Albums	1
U.S. Billboard Top Country Albums	43
U.S. Billboard Top Heatseekers	24
