= Israel Houghton =

American singer (born 1971)

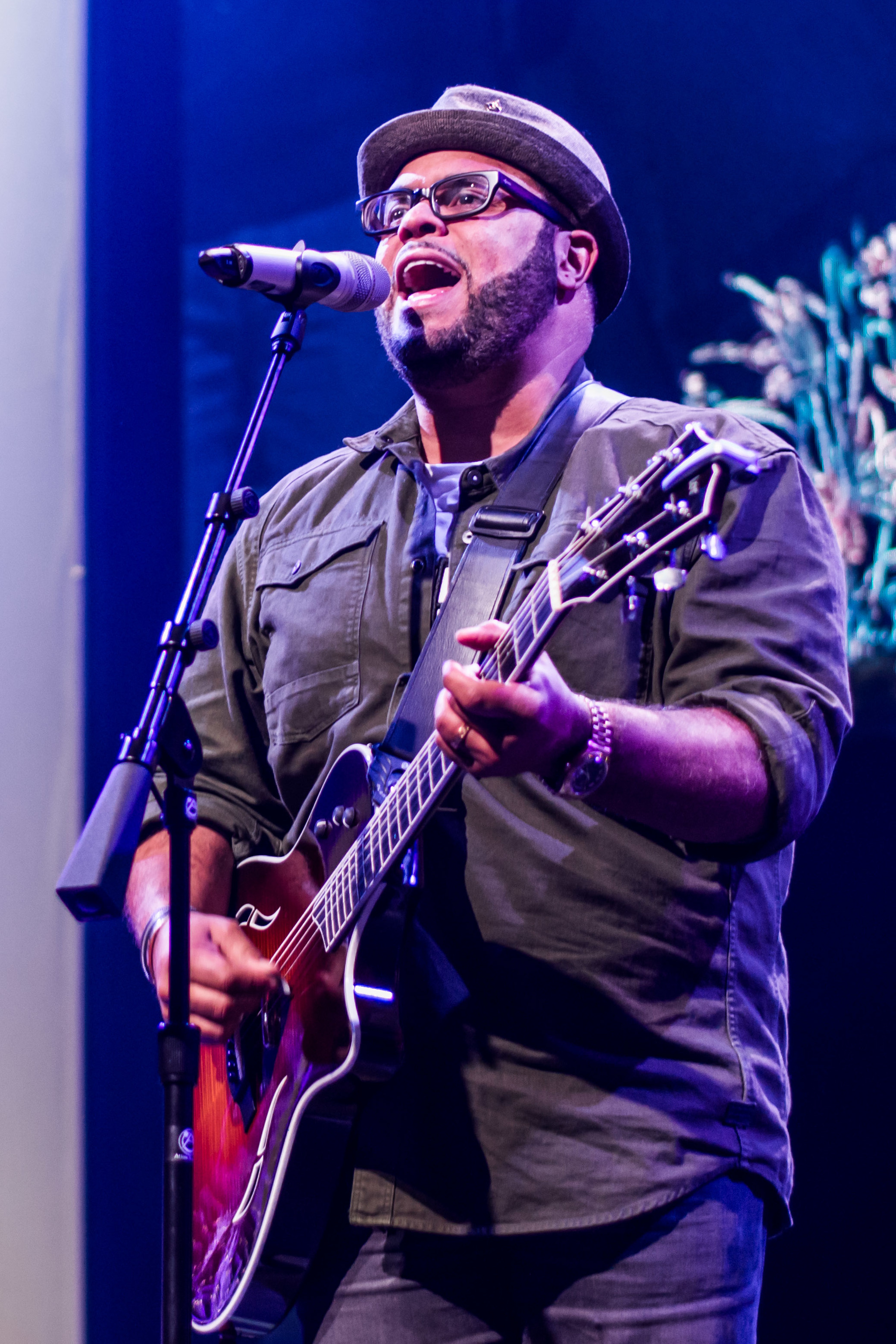
- Houghton in 2015

Background information
- Also known as: Israel
- Born: May 19, 1971 (age 55); Oceanside, California, U.S.
- Genres: Contemporary Christian music; gospel; praise & worship; soul
- Occupations: Singer; songwriter; producer; arranger
- Instruments: Vocals, guitar, keyboards
- Years active: 1997–present
- Labels: Integrity, RCA Inspiration, District 11
- Member of: New Breed
- Spouse: Meleasa Houghton (m. 1994; div. 2016) Adrienne Bailon (m. 2016)
- Partner: DeVawn Moreno (2011–2016)
- Website: israelandnewbreed.com

Israel Houghton (/ˈhoʊtən/; born May 19, 1971) is an American contemporary Christian music singer, songwriter, producer, and worship leader. His worship team is credited as Israel & New Breed.

== Musical career ==
Houghton produced an album by Michael Gungor, Bigger Than My Imagination, which was described as "one of the year's best worship albums" in a 2003 Christianity Today review.

=== Israel & New Breed ===
New Breed is the backing band of Israel Houghton. Many of Israel's album releases are credited to Israel & New Breed.

Houghton originally planned to hold a concert in Malaysia as part of her "Heal the Whole World Knows Tour 2026", but the country's authorities rejected it citing security concerns and her continued support for Israel, which was then followed by Indonesian authorities after it went viral in her home country that rejected her.

== Personal life ==
Houghton is biracial; he was born to a white mother and Jamaican father.

Houghton and his college girlfriend had a son together.

In 1994, Houghton married Meleasa Houghton, with whom he had three children: Mariah in 1996, Israel Jr. in 2001, and Milan in 2003. They separated in 2015 and their divorce was finalized in February 2016.

Also, during his first marriage, Houghton fathered two sons with his mistress, DeVawn Moreno: Kingston in 2012, and Khristian in 2014.

On November 11, 2016, Houghton married singer and TV personality Adrienne Bailon in Paris, after several months of dating. In 2022, the couple welcomed their first child together, a son.

== Discography ==
=== Albums ===
==== Studio albums ====
Title	Details	Peak chart positions		
Title	Details	US	US Christ	US Gospel
Whisper It Loud	Released: January 28, 1997; Label: Warner Records; Formats: CD, digital download, streaming	—	—	—
Real	Released: January 1, 2002; Label: Integrity Music; Formats: CD, digital download, streaming	—	33	13
Esse Momento...	Released: January 1, 2007; Label: Discotoni; Formats: CD, digital download, streaming	—	—	—
The Power of One	Released: March 29, 2009; Label: Integrity; Formats: CD, digital download, streaming	34	1	1
Love God. Love People.	Released: August 31, 2010; Label: Integrity; Formats: CD, digital download, streaming	—	—	—
Road to DeMaskUs	Released: September 28, 2018; Label: Provident Label Group/Sony Music Entertainment; Formats: CD, digital download, streaming	—	—	—
Feels Like Home, Vol. 1	Released: February 26, 2021; Label: District 11 Entertainment; Formats: CD, digital download, streaming	— (Note: Feels Like Home, Vol. 1 did not enter the Billboard 200, but peaked at number 26 on the Top Album Sales.)	3	1
Feels Like Home, Vol. 2	Released: April 2, 2021; Label: District 11; Formats: CD, digital download, streaming	—	—	7
Coritos, Vol. 1	Released: May 9, 2025; Label: District 11/Integrity; Formats: CD, digital download, streaming	—	—	12
Coritos, Vol. 2	Released: September 19, 2025; Label: District 11/Integrity; Formats: Digital download, streaming	—	—	—
Magnificent (with Philippa Hanna)	Released: May 22, 2026; Label: Integrity; Formats: Digital download, streaming	—	—	—
"—" denotes a recording that did not chart or was not released in that territory.

==== Live albums ====
Title	Details	Peak chart positions				Certifications
Title	Details	US	US Christ	US Gospel	UK C&G	Certifications
Nueva Generación	Released: January 1, 2001; Label: Integrity; Formats: CD, digital download, streaming	—	—	—	—	
New Season	Released: July 31, 2001; Label: Integrity; Formats: CD, digital download, streaming	—	—	—	—	
Live From Another Level	Released: January 1, 2004; Label: Integrity; Formats: CD, digital download, streaming	146	5	1	—	RIAA: Gold
Alive in South Africa	Released: August 20, 2005; Label: Integrity; Formats: CD, digital download, streaming	62	3	2	—	RIAA: Gold
A Deeper Level	Released: September 4, 2007; Label: Integrity; Formats: CD, digital download, streaming	48	3	1	—	
Jesus at the Center	Released: August 14, 2012; Label: Integrity; Formats: CD, digital download, streaming	32	1	2	17	
Covered: Alive in Asia	Released: July 24, 2015; Label: RGM NewBreed/RCA Records, Sony; Formats: CD, digital download, streaming	48	1	1	19	
Project LA: Alive in Los Angeles	Released: October 22, 2021; Label: District 11; Formats: CD, digital download, streaming	—	—	13	—	
Worship Anywhere: Live from Camp NewBreed	Released: October 7, 2022; Label: District 11; Formats: CD, digital download, streaming	—	—	12	—	
"—" denotes a recording that did not chart or was not released in that territory.

==== Christmas albums ====
Title	Details	Peak chart positions		
Title	Details	US Christ	US Gospel	US Holiday
A Timeless Christmas	Released: September 26, 2006; Label: Integrity; Formats: CD, digital download, streaming	40	11	32

==== Compilation albums ====
Title	Details	Peak chart positions	
Title	Details	US	US Gospel
Decade	Released: March 6, 2012; Label: Integrity; Formats: CD, digital download, streaming	— (Note: Decade did not enter the Billboard 200, but peaked at number 174 on the Top Current Album Sales.)	10
Playlist: The Very Best of Israel & New Breed	Released: January 21, 2014; Label: Integrity; Formats: CD, digital download, streaming	—	34
"—" denotes a recording that did not chart or was not released in that territory.

==== Spanish reissue albums ====
Title	Details	Peak chart positions			
Title	Details	US Christ	US Gospel	US Latin	US Latin Pop
Jesús En El Centro: En Vivo	Released: April 21, 2013; Label: Integrity/Columbia Record; Formats: CD, digital download, streaming	48	16	23	11
"—" denotes a recording that did not chart or was not released in that territory.

=== Charted singles ===
Title	Year	Peak chart positions			Album
Title	Year	US Adult R&B	US Gospel	US Gospel Air.	Album
"Not Forgotten"	2005	—	17		Alive in South Africa
"Turn It Around"	2006	—	17		Alive in South Africa
"With Long Life" (featuring T-Bone)	2007	—	13		A Deeper Level
"If Not for Your Grace"	2008	—	18		Non-album single
"It's Not Over (When God Is in It)" (featuring James Fortune and Jason Nelson)	2012	32	1		Jesus at the Center
"How Awesome Is Our God" (featuring Yolanda Adams)	2015	—	9	6	Non-album single
"Chasing Me Down" (featuring Tye Tribbett)	2016	—	15	—	Covered: Alive in Asia
"Hymn of Breakthrough"	2021	—	—	9	Feels Like Home, Vol. 1
"Coritos de Fuego" (with Unified Sound featuring Adriene Houghton, Nate Diaz, Aaron Moses, and Lucia Parker)	2025	—	12	—	Coritos, Vol. 1
"—" denotes a recording that did not chart or was not released in that territory.

=== Other charted songs ===
Title	Year	Peak chart positions		Album
Title	Year	US Gospel	US Gospel Air.	Album
"Friend of God"	2005	17		Alive in South Aftrica
"Give Thanks" (featuring Byron Cage)	2005	24		Alive in South Aftrica
"Another Breakthtough"	2005	26		Live From Another Level
"Again I Say Rejoice"	2005	28		Alive in South Africa
"—" denotes a recording that did not chart or was not released in that territory.

== Awards and nominations ==
=== Daytime Emmy Awards ===
The Daytime Emmy Awards are awarded yearly by the National Academy of Television Arts and Sciences (NATAS) for artistic and technical merit for American daytime television programming. Houhgton has received 1 nomination.

Year	Award	Nominated work	Result
2019	Outstanding Musical Performance in a Daytime Program	"Secrets" (shared with Adrienne Houghton)	Nominated

=== GMA Dove Awards ===
The Dove Awards are awarded annually by the Gospel Music Association. Houghton has won 15 awards from 40 nominations.

Year	Award	Nominated work	Result
2002	Contemporary Gospel Recorded Song of the Year	"There's a Liftin' of the Hands"	Nominated
2003	Contemporary Gospel Album of the Year	Real	Nominated
2003	Urban Recorded Song of the Year	"Get Up"	Nominated
2005	Contemporary Gospel Song of the Year	"Again I Say Rejoice"	Won
2005	Contemporary Gospel Album of the Year	Live From Another Level	Won
2005	Male Vocalist of the Year	Live From Another Level	Nominated
2005	Song of the Year	"Friend of God"	Nominated
2006	Contemporary Gospel Song of the Year	"Not Forgotten"	Won
2006	Song of the Year	"Friend of God"	Nominated
2006	Praise & Worship Album of the Year	Alive in South Africa	Nominated
2006	Long Form Music Video of the Year	Live From Another Level	Nominated
2007	Long Form Music Video of the Year	Alive in South Africa	Nominated
2007	Contemporary Gospel Song of the Year	"Turn It Around"	Won
2007	Contemporary Gospel Album of the Year	It's Not Over (as producer)	Won
2007	Choral Collection of the Year	Again I Say Rejoice: Celebrating The Songs Of Israel Houghton	Nominated
2007	Contemporary Gospel Recorded Song of the Year	"Favor" (as producer)	Nominated
2008	Contemporary Gospel Album of the Year	A Deeper Level	Won
2008	Producer of the Year	A Deeper Level	Nominated
2008	Contemporary Gospel Song of the Year	"Say So"	Won
2009	Contemporary Gospel Album of the Year	Change The World (as producer)	Won
2010	Urban Song of the Year	"Just Wanna Say"	Won
2010	Contemporary Gospel Song of the Year	"The Power of One (Change the World)"	Won
2010	Contemporary Gospel Song of the Year	"Every Prayer"	Nominated
2011	Contemporary Gospel Album of the Year	Love God, Love People	Won
2011	Male Vocalist of the Year	Love God, Love People	Nominated
2011	Contemporary Gospel Song of the Year	"You Hold My World"	Nominated
2013	Long Form Video of the Year	Jesus at the Center	Nominated
2013	Spanish Language Album of the Year	Jesus En El Centro	Nominated
2013	Gospel Performance of the Year	"It's Not Over (When God Is In It)"	Nominated
2013	Traditional Gospel Recorded Song of the Year	"It's Not Over (When God Is In It)"	Nominated
2014	Traditional Gospel Album of the Year	Duets (shared with Donnie McClurkin, Asaph A. Ward, Aaron W. Lindsey, Trent Phillips, Justin Savage)	Won
2014	Contemporary Gospel/Urban Recorded Song of the Year	"Sunday Kind of Love"	Nominated
2015	Traditional Gospel Recorded Song of the Year	"How Awesome Is Our God"	Won
2015	Gospel Artist of the Year	Himself	Nominated
2016	Urban Worship Album of the Year	Covered: Alive in Asia	Nominated
2019	Contemporary Gospel Album of the Year	Road To DeMaskUs	Nominated
2022	Contemporary Gospel Album of the Year	Clarity (as producer)	Won
2025	Gospel Worship Recorded Song of the Year	"One Hallelujah"	Nominated
2025	Spanish Language Recorded Song of the Year	"Coritos de Fuego"	Won
2025	Traditional Gospel Album of the Year	"Then and Now (Live)"	Nominated
2026	Spanish Language Recorded Song of the Year	"Digno"	Nominated
2026	Spanish Language Album of the Year	Coritos, Vol. 1	Nominated

=== Grammy Awards ===
The Grammy Awards are awarded annually by the National Academy of Recording Arts and Sciences. Houghton has won 8 awards from 18 nominations.

Year	Award	Nominated work	Result
2005	Best Contemporary Soul Gospel Album	Live From Another Level	Nominated
2006	Best Gospel Song	"Again I Say Rejoice"	Nominated
2007	Best Traditional Gospel Album	Alive in South Africa	Won
2007	Best Contemporary R&B Gospel Album	A Timeless Christmas	Nominated
2007	Best Gospel Song	"Not Forgotten"	Nominated
2007	Best Gospel Performance	"Not Forgotten"	Nominated
2008	Best Pop/Contemporary Gospel Album	A Deeper Level	Won
2008	Best Gospel Performance	"With Long Life"	Nominated
2010	Best Pop/Contemporary Gospel Album	The Power Of One	Won
2010	Best Gospel Song	"Every Prayer"	Nominated
2011	Best Pop/Contemporary Gospel Album	Love God, Love People	Won
2011	Best Gospel Performance	"You Hold My Hand"	Nominated
2013	Best Contemporary Christian Music Song	"Your Presence Is Heaven"	Won
2013	Best Gospel Album	Jesus at the Center: Live	Nominated
2016	Best Gospel Album	Covered: Alive In Asia – Israel & New Breed	Won
2016	Best Gospel Performance/Song	"How Awesome Is Our God"	Nominated
2022	Best Contemporary Christian Music Album	Feels Like Home, Vol. 2	Nominated
2025	Best Gospel Performance/Song	"One Hallelujah"	Won
2026	Best Contemporary Christian Music Album	Coritos Vol. 1	Won

=== Stellar Awards ===
The Stellar Awards are awarded annually by SAGMA. Houghton has received 2 awards from 33 nominations.

Year	Award	Nominated work	Result
2005	CD of the Year	Live from Another Level	Won
2005	Male Vocalist of the Year	Live from Another Level	Won
2005	Artist of the Year	Live from Another Level	Nominated
2005	Producer of the Year	Live from Another Level	Nominated
2006	Music Video of the Year	Live from Another Level	Nominated
2007	CD of the Year	ALIVE in South Africa	Nominated
2007	Contemporary CD of the Year	ALIVE in South Africa	Nominated
2007	Contemporary Male Vocalist of the Year	ALIVE in South Africa	Nominated
2007	Male Vocalist of the Year	ALIVE in South Africa	Nominated
2007	Urban/Inspirational Single / Performance of the Year	"Turn It Around"	Nominated
2009	Contemporary CD of the Year	Live: A Deeper Level	Nominated
2009	Contemporary Group/Duo of the Year	Live: A Deeper Level	Nominated
2009	Group/Duo of the Year	Live: A Deeper Level	Nominated
2009	Praise and Worship CD of the Year	Live: A Deeper Level	Nominated
2010	Male Vocalist of the Year	The Power of One	Nominated
2010	Praise and Worship CD of the Year	The Power of One	Nominated
2012	Contemporary Male Vocalist of the Year	Love God. Love People	Nominated
2012	Male Vocalist of the Year	Love God. Love People	Nominated
2012	Praise and Worship CD of the Year	Love God. Love People	Nominated
2012	Producer of the Year	Love God. Love People	Nominated
2014	Contemporary Group/Duo of the Year	Jesus at the Center: Live	Nominated
2014	Group/Duo of the Year	Jesus at the Center: Live	Nominated
2014	Praise and Worship CD of the Year	Jesus at the Center: Live	Nominated
2016	Contemporary Group/Duo of the Year	Covered: Alive in Asia	Nominated
2016	Group/Duo of the Year	Covered: Alive in Asia	Nominated
2016	Praise and Worship CD of the Year	Covered: Alive in Asia	Nominated
2016	Special Event CD of the Year	Covered: Alive in Asia	Nominated
2018	Urban/Inspirational Single or Performance of the Year	Reckless Love	Nominated
2018	Recorded Music Packaging of the Year	Road to DeMaskUs	Nominated
2022	Contemporary Duo/Group Chorus of the Year	Feels Like Home	Nominated
2022	Contemporary Male Artist of the Year	Feels Like Home	Nominated
2022	Duo/Group Chorus of the Year	Feels Like Home	Nominated
2022	Male Artist of the Year	Feels Like Home	Nominated
2026	Praise and Worship Album of the Year	Coritos Vol. 1	Nominated
