= The Grascals =

American bluegrass band

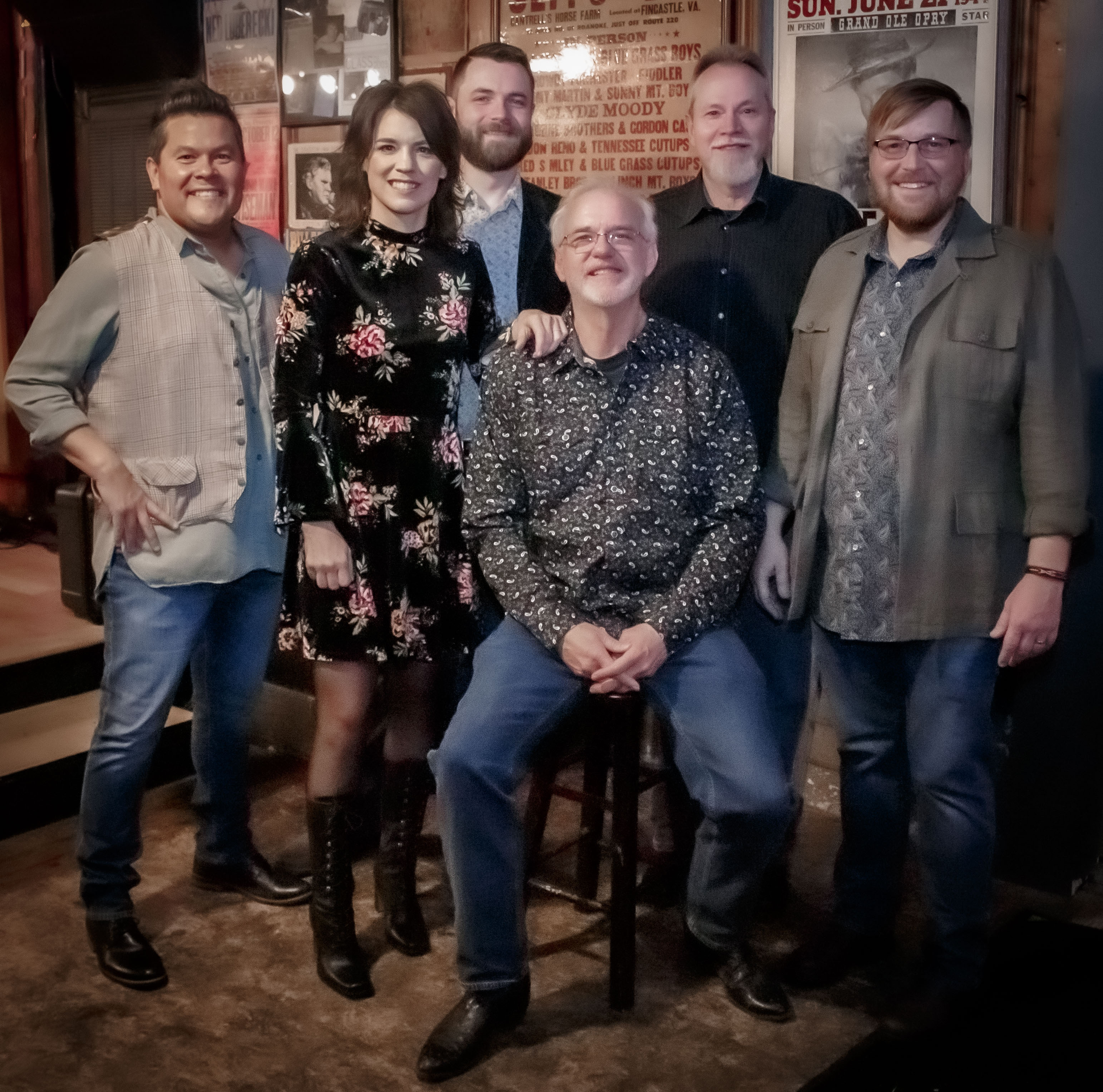

Background information
- Origin: Nashville, Tennessee U.S.
- Genres: Bluegrass, southern gospel
- Years active: 2004–present
- Labels: Billy Blue Records; Cracker Barrel; Saguaro Road Records; Mountain Home
- Members: Kyle Perkins; Danny Roberts; Kristin Scott Benson; Jamie Johnson; John Bryan; Jamie Harper
- Past members: Dave Talbot; Jimmy Mattingly; Aaron McDaris; Jeremy Abshire; Terry Eldredge; Chris Davis; Terry Smith; Adam Haynes
- Website: grascals.com

The Grascals are a six-piece American bluegrass band from Nashville, Tennessee. Founded in February 2004, the band has gained a level of fame by playing on the Grand Ole Opry and bluegrass festivals around the country, as well as with Dolly Parton.

== Members ==
- Terry Smith – upright bass/vocals
- Danny Roberts – mandolin
- Kristin Scott Benson – banjo
- Jamie Harper – fiddle
- John Bryan – guitar/vocals
- Jamie Johnson – guitar/vocals

=== Terry Smith ===
Terry Smith was born June 15, 1960, in Reidsville, North Carolina. He moved to Nashville in his early teens, after starting out playing in a family band with his mother Hazel Smith, father Patrick Smith, and brother, Billy Smith. Terry has played with such legends as Jimmy Martin, Wilma Lee Cooper, and the Osborne Brothers. Terry and his brother, Billy, recorded an album for CBS Records, which evolved to a number one video on CMT with "Blues Stay Away From Me." After touring with Grand Ole Opry member Mike Snider, Terry joined the Grascals and remains as a founding member.

=== Danny Roberts ===
Danny Roberts started playing guitar to back up Jimmy Mattingly when they were growing up in Leitchfield, Kentucky. He began to win contests for his guitar playing, and eventually, mandolin. In 1982, he co-founded the New Tradition, bluegrass/gospel group that toured the country for close to 20 years. The band recorded 10 CDs, made "Seed of Love" song, the first bluegrass video to feature the banjo, and even reached number one on the TNN channel. That band broke up in 2000, but Danny still continued to play with others including Marty Raybon, Larry Cordle, and Melonie Cannon. He also joined Ronnie Reno's band, the Reno Tradition. Danny joined the Grascals as a founding member, where he was reunited with Jimmy Mattingly.

=== Kristin Scott Benson ===
Kristin Scott Benson grew up in South Carolina in a musical family and joined the Grascals in January 2009. She worked previously with Petticoat Junction, Larry Cordle & Lonesome Standard Time and the Larry Stephenson Band. She has won the International Bluegrass Music Awards and Society of the Preservation of Bluegrass Music of America Banjo Player of the Year numerous times. In September 2018, she was chosen as the recipient of the Steve Martin Prize for Excellence in Banjo and Bluegrass with a $50,000 reward. Kristin is married to IIIrd Tyme Out mandolin player Wayne Benson.

=== John Bryan ===
John Bryan sings lead vocals and plays guitar with the Grascals. He's been playing and singing bluegrass since he was a teen, with a deep, family connection to the music. John's great-grandfather, Willard Watson, was a first cousin to Doc, and a fine old-time musician and dancer in his own right. John was formerly with Larry Efaw and The Bluegrass Mountaineers when he joined the Grascals in April 2015.

=== Jamie Johnson ===
Jamie Johnson was an original founding member since February 2004. He was raised in Indiana and now makes his home in Hendersonville, Tennessee. After an eight-year break, he has returned to the band on guitar and vocals. As of 2023, the band planned to resume touring.

=== Jamie Harper ===
Jamie "Harp" Harper plays fiddle for the Grascals and helps out on vocals as of January 2023. He is originally from North Carolina and now makes his home near Portland, TN with his wife Lakyn and son Stetson. "Harp" has a long bluegrass resume performing with Sideline and Junior Sisk among others

== Line Up Changes ==
- December 2006: Dave Talbot left and was replaced by Aaron McDaris on banjo beginning in 2007.
- July 2008: Jimmy Mattingly left and was replaced by Jeremy Abshire on fiddle.
- January 2009: Aaron McDaris left and was replaced by Kristin Scott Benson on banjo.
- October 2013: Jeremy Abshire left and was replaced by Adam Haynes on fiddle.
- April 2015: Jamie Johnson left and was replaced by John Bryan on guitar and vocals.
- February 2019: Terry Eldredge left and former member Jamie Johnson returned for a few months filling the void.
- May 2019: Chris Davis joined the band on guitar and vocals.
- September 2022: Chris Davis departed the Grascals, 9/24/2022, playing his final show with the band at the LeConte Center, Pigeon Forge, TN
- December 2022: founding member Jamie Johnson returned to the band following an eight-year hiatus.
- January 2023: Jamie Harper joined the Grascals, replacing Adam Haynes on fiddle

== History ==
The original concept of the Grascals occurred when the four core members, Terry Eldredge, Jamie Johnson, Jimmy Mattingly, and Dave Talbot, asked Terry Smith and Danny Roberts to join a new group they were wanting to start. They played one of their first shows at the Station Inn in February 2004 with special guest Bobby Osborne. The Grascals began recording their first album in 2004, which would simply be a self-titled album on Rounder Records. This album featured such songs as "Me and John and Paul" written by Harley Allen, "Where Corn Don't Grow" and another popular cover song, "Viva Las Vegas," which featured Dolly Parton. During the recording, Dolly Parton showed interest in wanting to play with the Grascals. The band soon became Dolly's opening act, as well as her bluegrass band. Performing at Dollywood and the Grand Ole Opry, the band and Dolly played a cover version of Elvis's song, "Viva Las Vegas." The first album made it on to the Billboard charts, as well as many country and bluegrass charts. Also on the album cover, Dolly is quoted saying, "One of the greatest albums I've ever heard."

== Notable accomplishments ==
- 2004–present: The Grascals have appeared on the stage of the Grand Ole Opry many times as a band.
- April 2, 2006: Performed at the Millennium Stage at the John F. Kennedy Center for the Performing Arts in Washington, DC. The concert was part of the center's Country: A Celebration of America's Music series.
- August 2006: The album Long List of Heartaches was released and featured many guests including George Jones, The Jordanaires, Steve Wariner, and Dierks Bentley.
- 2006: Recorded with friend Dierks Bentley on "Prodigal Son's Prayer" on his CD Long Trip Alone
- October 2006: Country Gold Tour to Japan
- November 19, 2006: Appeared on Hazel Smith's Southern Fried Flicks on CMT.
- March 13, 2007: Appeared with Dierks Bentley on the Late Late Show with Craig Ferguson.
- 2008: Filmed Bill and Gloria Gaither & Their Homecoming Friends Country Bluegrass Homecoming.
- July 5, 2008: Interviewed on CBS Early Show.
- July 15, 2008: Keep on Walkin' CD released with guest Vince Gill on "Sad Wind Sighs."
- November 25, 2008: Performed for the Fort Campbell, KY Troops and President of the United States George W. Bush.
- December 2, 2008: Performed for President of the United States George W. Bush and First Lady Laura Bush in Washington DC.
- September 2009: Exxon Mobil Delvac sponsored the band and wrapped their bus in their logo.
- September 7, 2009: Appeared on the Jerry Lewis Labor Day Telethon in Las Vegas, NV to support Muscular dystrophy.
- April 2, 2010: Joined the Hank Williams Jr. Rowdy Friends Tour including Hank, Jamey Johnson, and Eric Church for the month of April 2010.
- July 8, 2010: Performed at the Bluegrass Nights at the Ryman Auditorium, Nashville, TN
- September 19, 2010: Sang the National Anthem for the Tennessee Titans vs. the Pittsburgh Steelers at Nashville's LP Field.
- January 10, 2011: Released a CD Project for Cracker Barrel with an all-star guest list called The Grascals & Friends – Country Classics with a Bluegrass Spin. Guest artists included: Brad Paisley, Dierks Bentley, Charlie Daniels, Dolly Parton, The Oak Ridge Boys, Darryl Worley, Terri Clark, Randy Owen, Steven Seagal, Tom T. Hall, Joe Nichols and Ansley McLaurin.
- January 23, 2011: Appeared on Sunday's Fox & Friends.
- March 2011: Mayberry's Finest sponsored the band with a bus wrap and a CD Project called Dance 'til Your Stockings Are Hot and Ravelin'.
- April 12, 2011: Appeared on CBS on The Talk.
- January 11, 2012: Grascals sign with Mountain Home.
- August 2012: Vietti Chili sponsored the Grascals and featured their photo on their products as well as a bus wrap.
- January 21, 2013: Performed at the Smithsonian Institution's National Museum of the American Indian for a celebration of the Inauguration of the President of the United States, Barack Obama.
- January 25, 2013: Appeared on the Tonight Show with Jay Leno.
- February 27, 2013: Appeared with Marie Osmond on her talk show Marie.
- November 2013: Recorded a music video with guest country artist Dierks Bentley and Mike Wolfe from History Channel's American Pickers.
- June 2013: The Grascals to Appear on Chevrolet Riverfront Stage during the 2013 CMA Music Festival
- September 6, 2014: Appeared on PBS Song of the Mountains, Season 9, Episode 10.
- June 2, 2015: Signed with the Andrea Roberts Agency for bluegrass bookings.
- September 2018: Kristin Scott Benson was the 2018 recipient of the Steve Martin Prize for Excellence in Banjo and Bluegrass with $50,000 reward.

== Awards ==
=== International Bluegrass Music Awards ===
The Grascals have won the following 10 International Bluegrass Music Association (International Bluegrass Music Awards) awards.

- 2005 Emerging Artist of the Year – The Grascals
- 2005 Song of the Year "Me and John and Paul", The Grascals (artists), Harley Allen (songwriter)
- 2006 Album of the Year – Celebration of Life: Musicians Against Childhood Cancer (Compilation Project/Various Artists), Skaggs Family Records
- 2006 Entertainer of the Year – The Grascals
- 2007 Entertainer of the Year – The Grascals
- 2008 Banjo Performer of the Year – Kristin Scott Benson
- 2009 Banjo Performer of the Year – Kristin Scott Benson
- 2010 Banjo Performer of the Year – Kristin Scott Benson
- 2011 Banjo Performer of the Year (tie) – Kristin Scott Benson
- 2019 Banjo Performer of the Year – Kristin Scott Benson

=== Society of the Preservation of Bluegrass Music of America ===
The Grascals have also been awarded these 28 awards by the Society for the Preservation of Bluegrass Music of America.

- 2006 Song of the Year – Me and John and Paul by The Grascals for Rounder Records
- 2006 Bluegrass Album of the Year – The Grascals by The Grascals for Rounder Records
- 2006 Mandolin Performer of the Year – Danny Roberts
- 2006 Instrumental Group of the Year – The Grascals
- 2007 Instrumental Group of the Year – The Grascals
- 2007 Bluegrass Band of the Year (Overall) – The Grascals
- 2008 Mandolin Performer of the Year – Danny Roberts
- 2008 Instrumental Group of the Year – The Grascals
- 2008 Bluegrass Band of the Year (Overall) – The Grascals
- 2009 Bluegrass Album of the Year – Keep On Walkin' by The Grascals for Rounder Records
- 2009 Banjo Performer of the Year – Kristin Scott Benson
- 2009 Instrumental Group of the Year – The Grascals
- 2010 Bluegrass Band of the Year (Overall) – The Grascals
- 2011 Mandolin Performer of the Year – Danny Roberts
- 2011 Banjo Performer of the Year – Kristin Scott Benson
- 2011 Instrumental Group of the Year – The Grascals
- 2012 Banjo Performer of the Year – Kristin Scott Benson
- 2012 Instrumental Group of the Year – The Grascals
- 2013 Instrumental Group of the Year – The Grascals
- 2014 Mandolin Performer of the Year – Danny Roberts
- 2015 Mandolin Performer of the Year – Danny Roberts
- 2015 Instrumental Group of the Year – The Grascals
- 2016 Mandolin Performer of the Year – Danny Roberts
- 2017 Mandolin Performer of the Year – Danny Roberts (Tie)
- 2018 Banjo Performer of the Year – Kristin Scott Benson
- 2019 Banjo Performer of the Year – Kristin Scott Benson
- 2019 Bluegrass Band of the Year (Overall) – The Grascals
- 2019 Instrumental Group of the Year – The Grascals
- 2022 Bass Performer of the Year – Terry Smith

=== Grammy Nominations ===
The Grascals have received three Grammy Nominations for the following:

- 2005 Best Bluegrass Album – The Grascals (Rounder Records)
- 2006 Best Bluegrass Album – Long List Of Heartaches (Rounder Records)
- 2012 Best Bluegrass Album – Life Finds A Way (Mountain Home)

=== Miscellaneous Honors and Awards ===
- 2016 Smithville Fiddlers Jamboree – Blue Blaze Award for "actively cultivating a love of bluegrass music." – Danny Roberts
- 2017 Uncle Dave Macon Days – Trailblazer Award – The Grascals
- 2018 Steve Martin Prize for Excellence in Banjo and Bluegrass – Kristin Scott Benson

== Discography ==
=== Albums ===
Title	Album details	Peak chart positions				
Title	Album details	US Grass	US Country	US	US Heat	US Indie
The Grascals	Release date: February 8, 2005; Label: Rounder Records	3	—	—	—	—
Long List of Heartaches	Release date: August 29, 2006; Label: Rounder Records	1	70	—	—	—
Keep on Walkin'	Release date: July 15, 2008; Label: Rounder Records	1	43	—	24	—
The Famous Lefty Flynn's	Release date: March 30, 2010; Label: Rounder Records	3	61	—	—	—
Country Classics with a Bluegrass Spin	Release date: January 10, 2011; Label: Cracker Barrel	1	23	99	2	14
Dance Til Your Stockings Are Hot and Ravelin'	Release date: March 29, 2011; Label: Saguaro Road Records	5	—	—	—	—
Life Finds a Way	Release date: March 6, 2012; Label: Mountain Home	10	—	—	—	—
When I Get My Pay	Release date: November 19. 2013; Label: Mountain Home	12	—	—	—	—
And Then There's This...	Release date: January 8, 2016; Label: Mountain Home	1	49	—	—	—
Before Breakfast	Release date: September 1, 2017; Label: Mountain Home	2	—	—	—	—
Straighten the Curves	Release date: August 30, 2019; Label: Mountain Home	—	—	—	—	—
Up All Night	Release date: August 27, 2021; Label: Mountain Home	—	—	—	—	—
"—" denotes releases that did not chart in that category.

=== Music Videos ===
Year	Video	Director
2006	"Me and John and Paul"	Lark Watts
2010	"Last Train to Clarksville"	Marcel Chagnon
2011	"I Am Strong" (with Dolly Parton)	David Corlew
2013	"American Pickers" (with Dierks Bentley)	Zack Wilson
