= Long List of Heartaches =

Studio album by The Grascals
- Released: August 29, 2006
- Genre: Bluegrass
- Length: 41:19
- Label: Rounder Records

The Grascals chronology
| The Grascals (2005) | Long List of Heartaches (2006) | Keep on Walkin' (2008) |

Long List of Heartaches is the second album released by the Grascals and the second album they released on Rounder Records. It features a variety of guests, from George Jones to the Jordanaires. This album was released shortly before the band won the IBMA Entertainer of the Year Award honor in 2006.

Jeff Tamarkin of AllMusic rated the album 3.5 out of 5 stars, writing that the group “delivered a sophomore effort that confirms their refreshing 2004 debut was no fluke.”

== Track listing ==
1. Home (2:15)
2. Long List of Heartaches (2:38)
3. You Don't Have Very Far to Go (3:18)
4. Will You Be Loving Another Man (2:20)
5. Being Me (3:44)
6. Did You Forget God Today (3:15)
7. Hard Times (3:40)
8. Cut Your Wheels (2:57)
9. Don't Tell Mama (4:04)
10. Roll Muddy River (3:08)
11. My Night to Howl (2:29)
12. Keep Me from Blowing Away (3:18)
13. Hoedown in Motown (3:13)

== Personnel ==
Jamie Johnson - Vocals/guitar
Terry Eldredge - Vocals/guitar
Jimmy Mattingly - fiddle
Danny Roberts - mandolin
Dave Talbot - Harmony/banjo
Terry Smith - Harmony/bass
George Jones - "Don't Tell Mama"
The Jordanaires - "Did You Forget God Today"
Dierks Bentley - "Being Me"
Steve Wariner - "Hoedown in Motown"

== Chart performance ==
| Chart (2006) | Peak position |
|---|---|
| U.S. Billboard Top Bluegrass Albums | 1 |
| U.S. Billboard Top Country Albums | 70 |
