= One Wild Life: Spirit =

Studio album by Gungor
- Released: March 25, 2016
- Genre: Worship; Christian alternative rock; pop rock
- Length: 43:29
- Label: Hither & Yon

Gungor chronology
| One Wild Life: Soul (2015) | One Wild Life: Spirit (2016) | One Wild Life: Body (2016) |

One Wild Life: Spirit is a studio album by Gungor. Hither & Yon Records released the album on March 25, 2016.

== Critical reception ==
Professional ratings
Review scores
| Source | Rating |
|---|---|
| The Christian Beat | 5/5 stars |
| Cross Rhythms | 10/10 squares |

Awarding the album ten out of ten by Cross Rhythms, Lins Honeyman writes, the album "showcases the duo's ability to bravely say things that rarely get said in songs – tackling extremism from all walks of religion bolstered by a plea to God for it to end – and crowns the latest in a long line of groundbreaking Gungor creations." Madeleine Dittmer, rating the album five stars at The Christian Beat, states, "Spirit conveys important messages in each song while simultaneously offering creative, beautiful music...Each track could stand alone as a work worthy of praise, but as a whole, Spirit is beautiful, convicting music."

== Track listing ==
Track list
| No. | Title | Length |
|---|---|---|
| 1. | "Magic" | 3:17 |
| 2. | "Anthem" | 3:38 |
| 3. | "Wonder" | 4:01 |
| 4. | "Spirit Becomes Us" | 1:43 |
| 5. | "Whale" | 3:20 |
| 6. | "Kiss the Night" | 4:52 |
| 7. | "Let Bad Religion Die" | 3:36 |
| 8. | "Love Is All" | 4:12 |
| 9. | "Hurricane" | 4:54 |
| 10. | "We Are Alive" | 4:12 |
| 11. | "Body & Blood" | 5:44 |
| Total length: | | 43:29 |

== Chart performance ==
| Chart (2016) | Peak position |
|---|---|
| US Christian Albums (Billboard) | 42 |
