= One Wild Life: Soul =

Studio album by Gungor
- Released: August 7, 2015
- Genre: Worship, Christian alternative rock, indie rock
- Length: 54:11
- Label: Hither & Yon

Gungor chronology
I Am Mountain (2013)	One Wild Life: Soul (2015)	One Wild Life: Spirit (2016)

One Wild Life: Soul is a studio album by Gungor. Hither & Yon Records released the album on August 7, 2015.

== Critical reception ==
Professional ratings
Review scores
Source	Rating
CCM Magazine	4.5/5 stars
The Christian Beat	3.9/5
Cross Rhythms	10/10 squares
Worship Leader	4/5 stars

Awarding the album four and a half stars from CCM Magazine, Kevin Sparkman writes, "Soul is expertly crafted and calls for all within earshot to take immediate notice." Lauren McLean, rating the album a 3.9 out of five at The Christian Beat, states, "Writing from unbearable experiences and life itself, this album is easy on the ears and good for the heart." Giving the album four stars by Worship Leader, Jeremy Armstrong describes, "This is kingdom art. It's jarring to some, but some jarring is good...God who is seen dimly, but also more clearly when we chase after him with this One Wild Life." Jonathan Harris, indicating in a ten out of ten review by Cross Rhythms, says, "This album catches so many emotions so powerfully."

== Track listing ==
No.	Title	Length
1.	"Introduction"	2:33
2.	"Lion of Rock"	5:31
3.	"Moon Song"	3:47
4.	"One Wild Life"	4:07
5.	"We Are Stronger"	3:38
6.	"Light"	4:59
7.	"At Sea"	4:45
8.	"Land of the Living"	4:28
9.	"Us for Them"	5:09
10.	"Am I"	5:20
11.	"You"	4:56
12.	"Vapor"	4:58
Total length:		54:11

== Chart performance ==
In its debut week, the album sold 5,000 copies in the US.

Chart (2015)	Peak position
US Billboard 200	118
US Top Alternative Albums (Billboard)	12
US Top Christian Albums (Billboard)	2
US Independent Albums (Billboard)	7
US Top Rock Albums (Billboard)	19
