= A Timeless Christmas =

Studio album by Israel & New Breed
- Released: 2006

A Timeless Christmas is a Christmas album released in 2006 by Israel & New Breed. It is their second studio album following “Real”. The album would reach number 40 in 2006 on the Billboard charts for Top Christian albums.

== Reception ==
The album was criticized by one Christian music journalist for being formulaic, but still part of a body of work that blended black and white music styles. The album was also reviewed as featuring impeccable instrumentals, while some tracks were described as "unnecessary" and "exhausting."

== Track listing ==
1. "Nutcracker Overture"
2. "Everybody Knows"
3. "Hark" (featuring Matthew Ward)
4. "O Come"
5. "Tidings"
6. "Christmas Worship Medley"
7. "Least of These"
8. "Nutcracker Interlude"
9. "By Christmas Day" (featuring Marvin Winans)
10. "Nocturnal Mist" (featuring Marcus Miller)
11. "Silent Nocturne" (featuring Lalah Hathaway & Gerald Albright)
12. "Sonny Boy Christmas" (featuring Israel Duncan Houghton II)
13. "Go Tell It
14. "We Wish You A Timeless Christmas" (featuring CeCe Winans)
15. "Have Yourself A Merry Little Christmas" (featuring Marvin Winans, CeCe Winans, Matthew Ward, Lalah Hathaway, Daniel Johnson and Gerald Albright)
