= List of 2009 albums =

The following is a list of albums, EPs, and mixtapes released in 2009. These albums are (1) original, i.e. excluding reissues, remasters, and compilations of previously released recordings, and (2) notable, defined as having received significant coverage from reliable sources independent of the subject.

For additional information about bands formed, reformed, disbanded, or on hiatus, for deaths of musicians, and for links to musical awards, see 2009 in music.

== First quarter ==
=== January ===
List of albums released in January 2009
Go to: January | February | March | April | May | June | July | August | September | October | November | December | Back to top
Release date	Artist	Album	Genre	Label	Ref.
January 6	Animal Collective	Merriweather Post Pavilion	Psychedelic pop, electronic pop, synth-pop	Domino	
January 9	Saxon	Into the Labyrinth	Heavy metal	SPV/Steamhammer	
January 12	Fever Ray	Fever Ray	Electronic pop	Rabid	
January 12	Ugly Duckling	Audacity	Hip-hop	Fat Beats Records	
January 13	Joshua Redman	Compass	Post-bop	Nonesuch	
January 13	Kreator	Hordes of Chaos	Thrash metal	SPV/Steamhammer	
January 13	Novalima	Coba Coba		Cumbancha	
January 13	Oh No Not Stereo	003			
January 13	Timber Timbre	Timber Timbre	Blues, folk	Out of This Spark, Arts & Crafts	
January 13	Various artists	Notorious	Hip-hop	Bad Boy	
January 15	Myka 9	1969	Hip-hop	Fake Four Inc.	
January 19	Antony and the Johnsons	The Crying Light	Baroque pop	Secretly Canadian	
January 19	White Lies	To Lose My Life...	Post-punk revival, indie rock	Fiction	
January 20	16	Bridges to Burn	Sludge metal	Relapse	
January 20	A. C. Newman	Get Guilty	Indie rock	Matador, Last Gang	
January 20	Andrew Bird	Noble Beast	Baroque pop	Fat Possum, Bella Union	
January 20	Anya Marina	Slow & Steady Seduction: Phase II			
January 20	BeauSoleil	Alligator Purse			
January 20	Bon Iver	Blood Bank	Indie folk	Jagjaguwar	
January 20	Cattle Decapitation	The Harvest Floor	Deathgrind, technical death metal	Metal Blade	
January 20	Coconut Records	Davy	Indie pop, indie rock	Young Baby Records	
January 20	Cymbals Eat Guitars	Why There Are Mountains	Indie rock	Cymbals Eat Guitars	
January 20	Fiction Family	Fiction Family	Folk, rock	ATO, lowercase people	
January 20	John Frusciante	The Empyrean	Experimental rock, psychedelic rock, post-rock	Record Collection	
January 20	Matt and Kim	Grand	Dance-punk, indie rock, indie pop	Fader Label, Universal	
January 20	Psychic Ills	Mirror Eye		The Social Registry	
January 20	Reel Big Fish	Fame, Fortune and Fornication	Ska punk	Rock Ridge Music	
January 20	Robert Pollard	The Crawling Distance	Rock, indie rock	Guided by Voices	
January 20	Telefon Tel Aviv	Immolate Yourself	Electropop	BPitch Control	
January 20	Umphrey's McGee	Mantis	Progressive rock	SCI Fidelity	
January 23	Napalm Death	Time Waits for No Slave	Grindcore	Century Media	
January 23	Sepultura	A-Lex	Groove metal, thrash metal, death metal	SPV	
January 26	Architects	Hollow Crown	Metalcore, mathcore	Century Media, Distort, United By Fate Records	
January 26	Franz Ferdinand	Tonight: Franz Ferdinand	Indie rock, dance-punk, new wave	Domino	
January 26	The Phantom Band	Checkmate Savage	Folk, pop, blues	Chemikal Underground	
January 26	Stuck in the Sound	Shoegazing Kids	Indie rock, shoegaze	Discograph	
January 27	The Bird and the Bee	Ray Guns Are Not Just the Future	Indie pop, electronic	Blue Note	
January 27	Bruce Springsteen	Working on a Dream	Rock	Columbia	
January 27	Crooked X	Crooked X	Hard rock, heavy metal	Capitol	
January 27	Dälek	Gutter Tactics		Ipecac	
January 27	Dirty Little Rabbits	Simon	Indie	The End	
January 27	Duncan Sheik	Whisper House		RCA Victor	
January 27	Hoobastank	Fornever	Post-grunge, alternative rock	Island	
January 27	Lisa "Left Eye" Lopes	Eye Legacy	Hip-hop, R&B	Mass Appeal, eOne	
January 27	Nickel Eye	The Time of the Assassins		Rykodisc	
January 27	Ten Second Epic	Hometown	Alternative rock, emo	Black Box Music	

=== February ===
List of albums released in February 2009
Go to: January | February | March | April | May | June | July | August | September | October | November | December | Back to top
Release date	Artist	Album	Genre	Label	Ref.
February 2	Adagio	Archangels in Black	Symphonic metal, progressive metal, doom metal	Listenable	
February 2	Ben Kweller	Changing Horses	Country rock, alt-country, folk rock	ATO, The Noise Company	
February 2	The View	Which Bitch?	Indie rock	1965	
February 3	Cannibal Corpse	Evisceration Plague	Death metal	Metal Blade	
February 3	A Day to Remember	Homesick	Metalcore, pop-punk, post-hardcore	Victory	
February 3	Dierks Bentley	Feel That Fire	Country	Capitol Nashville	
February 3	The Fray	The Fray	Alternative rock, pop rock	Epic	
February 3	The Loved Ones	Distractions	Punk rock, Americana	Fat Wreck Chords	
February 3	The Pains of Being Pure at Heart	The Pains of Being Pure at Heart	Indie pop, noise pop, dream pop	Slumberland	
February 3	P.O.S	Never Better	Hip-hop	Rhymesayers	
February 3	The Red Jumpsuit Apparatus	Lonely Road	Alternative rock, pop-punk, emo pop	Virgin	
February 3	Two Tongues	Two Tongues	Pop-punk, indie rock, emo	Vagrant	
February 3	The Von Bondies	Love, Hate and Then There's You	Alternative rock, garage rock	Majordomo	
February 3	Wavves	Wavvves	Noise pop, lo-fi	Fat Possum	
February 4	Hideki Sakamoto and Naoki Satō	428: Fūsa Sareta Shibuya de Original Soundtrack		Lantis	
February 4	Lily Allen	It's Not Me, It's You	Electropop	Regal, Parlophone	
February 8	Asobi Seksu	Acoustic at Olympic Studios	Indie rock, shoegaze, dream pop	One Little Indian	
February 9	Emmy the Great	First Love	Anti-folk	Close Harbour Records	
February 9	Hot Leg	Red Light Fever	Glam metal, hard rock, glam rock	Barbecue Rock Records	
February 9	Van Morrison	Astral Weeks Live at the Hollywood Bowl	Folk rock	Listen to the Lions Records	
February 10	Bobby V	The Rebirth	R&B	Blu Kolla Dreams, EMI	
February 10	Dan Auerbach	Keep It Hid	Blues rock, garage rock, indie folk	Nonesuch	
February 10	India Arie	Testimony: Vol. 2, Love & Politics	R&B	Soulbird Records, Universal Republic	
February 10	The Lonely Island	Incredibad	Comedy hip-hop	Universal Republic	
February 10	Malajube	Labyrinthes	Indie rock	Dare to Care	
February 10	Red	Innocence & Instinct	Alternative metal, Christian rock, post-grunge	Sony Music, Essential	
February 10	Ryan Leslie	Ryan Leslie	R&B, hip-hop	NextSelection Lifestyle Group, Casablanca, Universal Motown	
February 13	Mando Diao	Give Me Fire!	Indie rock, garage rock	Universal	
February 15	Bomb the Music Industry!	Scrambles	Indie rock, punk rock	Quote Unquote, Asian Man	
February 16	Morrissey	Years of Refusal	Alternative rock	Decca, Lost Highway	
February 16	Various artists	Dark Was the Night	Alternative rock, indie pop, indie rock	4AD	
February 17	Alela Diane	To Be Still	Indie folk, psychedelic folk, Americana	Rough Trade	
February 17	...And You Will Know Us by the Trail of Dead	The Century of Self	Art rock	Richter Scale, Justice Records	
February 17	The Appleseed Cast	Sagarmatha	Indie rock, post-rock	Vagrant, The Militia Group	
February 17	Asobi Seksu	Hush	Dream pop	Polyvinyl	
February 17	Beirut	March of the Zapotec/Holland	Indie folk, Balkan folk, electronica	Pompeii	
February 17	J-Kwon	Hood Hop 2		Hood Hop Music	
February 17	Jason Isbell and the 400 Unit	Jason Isbell and the 400 Unit	Americana, folk	Lightning Rod Records	
February 17	Lissy Trullie	Self-Taught Learner		American Myth Records, Wichita	
February 17	Living Things	Habeas Corpus	Indie rock	Jive	
February 17	M. Ward	Hold Time	Alternative rock, folk	Merge, 4AD	
February 17	Mishka	Above the Bones			
February 17	N.A.S.A.	The Spirit of Apollo	Baile funk, hip-hop, electronica	Anti-	
February 17	Odd Nosdam	T.I.M.E. Soundtrack	Instrumental hip-hop	Anticon	
February 17	Plushgun	Pins & Panzers	New wave, indie rock, synth-pop	Tommy Boy	
February 17	Scale the Summit	Carving Desert Canyons	Progressive metal, djent, instrumental rock	Prosthetic	
February 17	Thursday	Common Existence	Post-hardcore	Epitaph	
February 17	Vetiver	Tight Knit	Folk rock	Sub Pop	
February 17	William Elliott Whitmore	Animals in the Dark			
February 17	Within the Ruins	Creature	Metalcore, progressive metal	Victory	
February 17	Wolves in the Throne Room	Malevolent Grain	Black metal, dark ambient	Southern Lord, Conspiracy Records	
February 17	Zion I	The Takeover	Hip-hop	Gold Dust Media	
February 17	Zu	Carboniferous	Experimental metal	Ipecac	
February 20	Toni Gonzaga and Sam Milby	Love Duets	Pop	Star Music	
February 23	Blut Aus Nord	Memoria Vetusta II – Dialogue with the Stars	Atmospheric black metal	Candlelight	
February 23	Gui Boratto	Take My Breath Away	House, minimal techno	Kompakt	
February 23	Lamb of God	Wrath	Groove metal, thrash metal	Epic, Roadrunner	
February 23	The Prodigy	Invaders Must Die	New rave	Cooking Vinyl	
February 24	B-Real	Smoke n Mirrors	West Coast hip-hop, Latin hip-hop	Duck Down	
February 24	Black Lips	200 Million Thousand	Garage punk, psychedelic rock	Vice	
February 24	Chris Isaak	Mr. Lucky	Rock and roll	Wicked Games, Reprise	
February 24	Clem Snide	Hungry Bird	Alternative country	429	
February 24	Gentleman Reg	Jet Black	Indie pop	Arts & Crafts	
February 24	God Forbid	Earthsblood	Thrash metal, metalcore	Century Media	
February 24	Howie Beck	How to Fall Down in Public	Indie rock	13 Clouds Records	
February 24	Jake Owen	Easy Does It	Country	RCA Nashville	
February 24	JJ Cale	Roll On	Americana	Rounder	
February 24	Joe Budden	Padded Room	Hip-hop	Amalgam Digital	
February 24	K'naan	Troubadour	Canadian hip-hop, worldbeat	A&M/Octone	
February 24	Marianas Trench	Masterpiece Theatre	Pop-punk, symphonic rock	604	
February 24	MC Lars	This Gigantic Robot Kills	Nerdcore, ska punk, West Coast hip-hop	Oglio	
February 24	Project Pat	Real Recognize Real	Gangsta rap, Southern hip-hop	Hypnotize Minds, Asylum	
February 25	Jenny Wilson	Hardships!	Art rock	Gold Medal Recordings	
February 27	Now, Now Every Children	Cars	Indie pop	Tapete	
February 27	U2	No Line on the Horizon	Rock	Mercury, Island, Interscope	

=== March ===
List of albums released in March 2009
Go to: January | February | March | April | May | June | July | August | September | October | November | December | Back to top
Release date	Artist	Album	Genre	Label	Ref.
March 1	Cursive	Mama, I'm Swollen	Emo, indie rock	Saddle Creek	
March 2	The Answer	Everyday Demons	Hard rock	Albert	
March 2	Howling Bells	Radio Wars	Indie rock	Independiente	
March 2	Red Light Company	Fine Fascination	Alternative rock	Lavolta Records	
March 3	Béla Fleck	Tales from the Acoustic Planet, Vol. 3: Africa Sessions	African	Rounder	
March 3	Justin Townes Earle	Midnight at the Movies	Americana, country, bluegrass	Bloodshot	
March 3	Marissa Nadler	Little Hells	Folk	Kemado	
March 3	Neko Case	Middle Cyclone	Alternative country, indie folk	Anti-	
March 3	A Plea for Purging	Depravity	Metalcore, Christian death metal	Facedown	
March 3	Shout Out Out Out Out	Reintegration Time	Electro, alternative dance, dance-punk	Nrmls Wlcm Records	
March 4	Fly	Sky & Country	Jazz	ECM	
March 5	Connie Converse	How Sad, How Lovely	American folk	Lau Derette Recordings	
March 6	The Church	Untitled #23	Alternative rock, neo-psychedelia, psychedelic rock	Unorthodox Records, Second Motion	
March 6	Kelly Clarkson	All I Ever Wanted	Pop, pop rock	RCA	
March 6	Yeah Yeah Yeahs	It's Blitz!	Synth-punk, alternative rock	Dress Up Records, DGC, Interscope	
March 9	Fight Like Apes	You Filled His Head with Fluffy Clouds and Jolly Ranchers, What Did You Think Was Going to Happen?			
March 9	The Invisible	The Invisible		Accidental	
March 9	Mel Parsons	Over My Shoulder	Folk, alternative country	Cape Road Recordings	
March 9	Micachu	Jewellery	Avant-pop, art pop, electronic pop	Rough Trade	
March 9	Pure Reason Revolution	Amor Vincit Omnia	New prog, electronic rock, electronica	Superball	
March 9	Polly Scattergood	Polly Scattergood	Indie pop, experimental	Mute	
March 9	Starsailor	All the Plans	Alternative rock, post-Britpop	Virgin, EMI	
March 10	Attack in Black	Years (by One Thousand Fingertips)	Folk rock	Dine Alone	
March 10	Bell Orchestre	As Seen Through Windows	Instrumental rock	Arts & Crafts	
March 10	Chris Cornell	Scream	Dance-pop, pop rock	Mosley Music, Suretone	
March 10	Dope	No Regrets	Industrial metal, alternative metal, nu metal	eOne	
March 10	The-Dream	Love vs. Money	R&B	Radio Killa, Def Jam	
March 10	Ektomorf	What Doesn't Kill Me...	Groove metal	AFM	
March 10	Handsome Furs	Face Control	Electropunk	Sub Pop	
March 10	J. Holiday	Round 2	R&B, hip-hop	Music Line Group, Capitol	
March 10	Julie Doiron	I Can Wonder What You Did with Your Day	Indie rock	Jagjaguwar, Endearing	
March 10	Julien-K	Death to Analog	Electronic rock, dance-rock, alternative dance	Metropolis,	
March 10	Mirah	(a)spera	Indie rock, indie pop, chamber pop	K	
March 10	New Found Glory	Not Without a Fight	Pop-punk	Epitaph	
March 10	The Number Twelve Looks Like You	Worse Than Alone	Mathcore	Eyeball	
March 10	Propagandhi	Supporting Caste	Punk rock	G7 Welcoming Committee, Smallman Records, Hassle Records	
March 10	RBD	Para olvidarte de mí	Latin pop	EMI	
March 10	The Riverboat Gamblers	Underneath the Owl			
March 10	Seventh Day Slumber	Take Everything	Christian rock	BEC	
March 10	Tim Hecker	An Imaginary Country	Ambient, drone	Kranky	
March 10	Yngwie Malmsteen	Angels of Love	Folk rock, instrumental rock, neoclassical metal	Koch, Rising Force Records	
March 12	Miss Kittin & The Hacker	Two	Electronica, electroclash, dance	Nobody's Bizzness	
March 12	Super Junior	Sorry, Sorry	K-pop, R&B, dance	SM	
March 13	Peter Doherty	Grace/Wastelands	Alternative rock	EMI, Astralwerks	
March 13	Utada	This Is the One	Pop, R&B	Island	
March 16	Delirious?	My Soul Sings	Rock, Christian rock	Sparrow, Furious? Records	
March 16	Pestilence	Resurrection Macabre	Death metal	Mascot	
March 16	Super Furry Animals	Dark Days/Light Years	Alternative rock, experimental rock	Rough Trade	
March 17	Ace Enders and a Million Different People	When I Hit the Ground	Emo-pop, alternative rock	Vagrant	
March 17	Bonnie "Prince" Billy	Beware	Americana, alternative country, indie folk	Drag City	
March 17	Capone-N-Noreaga	Channel 10	East Coast hip-hop, hardcore hip-hop, gangsta rap	SMC	
March 17	Gorilla Zoe	Don't Feed da Animals	Hip-hop	Bad Boy South, Block, Atlantic	
March 17	Into the Moat	The Campaign	Mathcore, metalcore, technical death metal	Metal Blade	
March 17	Kylesa	Static Tensions	Sludge metal, progressive metal	Prosthetic	
March 17	Mstrkrft	Fist of God	Electro house	Last Gang, Dim Mak, Downtown	
March 17	Static-X	Cult of Static	Industrial metal, nu metal	Reprise	
March 17	Superdrag	Industry Giants	Punk rock, power pop, shoegaze	Superdrag Sound Laboratories, Thirty Tigers	
March 17	Willie Nelson	Naked Willie	Country	Legacy	
March 18	Pet Shop Boys	Yes	Synth-pop	Parlophone	
March 18	Röyksopp	Junior	Electronic pop	Wall of Sound	
March 20	Delain	April Rain	Symphonic metal	Roadrunner	
March 20	HammerFall	No Sacrifice, No Victory	Power metal, heavy metal	Nuclear Blast	
March 20	Nine Inch Nails, Jane's Addiction and Street Sweeper Social Club	NINJA 2009 Tour Sampler	Alternative rock	The Null Corporation	
March 23	Hatesphere	To the Nines	Thrash metal, melodic death metal	Napalm	
March 23	The Rakes	Klang	Indie rock, post-punk revival	V2	
March 23	Therapy?	Crooked Timber	Alternative metal, alternative rock	Demolition Records	
March 24	Blue October	Approaching Normal	Alternative rock	Universal	
March 24	Condo Fucks	Fuckbook	Indie rock, garage rock	Matador	
March 24	Dan Deacon	Bromst	Indietronica, noise pop	Carpark	
March 24	The Decemberists	The Hazards of Love	Folk rock, chamber pop, progressive folk	Capitol, Rough Trade	
March 24	Falling Up	Fangs	Art rock, experimental rock	BEC	
March 24	Flo Rida	R.O.O.T.S.	Pop-rap	Poe Boy, Atlantic	
March 24	Jim Jones	Pray IV Reign	Hip-hop	eOne, Columbia, Sony Music	
March 24	Joel Plaskett	Three	Indie rock, folk rock, folk	MapleMusic	
March 24	John Rich	Son of a Preacher Man	Country	Warner Bros.	
March 24	Junior Boys	Begone Dull Care	Synth-pop	Domino	
March 24	Keri Hilson	In a Perfect World...	R&B	Mosley Music, Zone 4, Interscope	
March 24	KMFDM	Blitz	Industrial rock, electro-industrial	Metropolis	
March 24	Leela James	Let's Do It Again		Shanachie	
March 24	Mastodon	Crack the Skye	Progressive metal	Reprise	
March 24	Martina McBride	Shine	Country	RCA Nashville	
March 24	MF Doom	Born Like This	Hip-hop	Lex	
March 24	Mono	Hymn to the Immortal Wind		Temporary Residence Limited	
March 24	MxPx	On the Cover II		Tooth & Nail	
March 24	Papa Roach	Metamorphosis	Glam metal, hard rock	DGC, Interscope	
March 24	Slim Thug	Boss of All Bosses	Hip-hop	Koch	
March 24	Vanna	A New Hope	Post-hardcore, metalcore	Epitaph	
March 24	Various artists	Hannah Montana: The Movie	Pop, country	Walt Disney	
March 24	Yanni	Yanni Voices		Yanni Wake Records, Disney Pearl	
March 25	Ayumi Hamasaki	Next Level	Electronic	Avex Trax	
March 25	Themselves	The Free Houdini	Alternative hip-hop	Anticon	
March 30	Kaki King	Mexican Teenagers	Instrumental rock	Cooking Vinyl	
March 30	The Leisure Society	The Sleeper	Folk-pop	Willkommen Records	
March 30	Peter Bjorn and John	Living Thing	Indie pop	Wichita, Startime	
March 30	The Whitest Boy Alive	Rules	Indie pop, dream pop	Bubbles Records	
March 30	The Xcerts	In the Cold Wind We Smile	Indie rock, post-hardcore, power pop	Xtra Mile, King Tuts Recordings	
March 31	Bow Wow	New Jack City II	Hip-hop, gangsta rap, R&B	LBW Entertainment, Columbia	
March 31	Burn Halo	Burn Halo	Hard rock, alternative metal, post-grunge	Rawkhead Records	
March 31	Death Cab for Cutie	The Open Door	Alternative rock	Atlantic, Barsuk	
March 31	Diana Krall	Quiet Nights	Jazz, bossa nova	Verve	
March 31	Gavin DeGraw	Free	Soft rock	J	
March 31	Great Lake Swimmers	Lost Channels	Folk rock	Nettwerk	
March 31	Impending Doom	The Serpent Servant	Deathcore	Facedown	
March 31	Keith Urban	Defying Gravity	Country	Capitol Nashville	
March 31	Maria Taylor	LadyLuck	Folk rock	Flower Moon Records, Nettwerk	
March 31	Queensrÿche	American Soldier	Hard rock, progressive metal	ATCO, Rhino	
March 31	Rodney Atkins	It's America	Country	Curb	
March 31	Stevie Nicks	The Soundstage Sessions	Rock	Reprise	
March 31	UGK	UGK 4 Life	Hip-hop	Jive	
March 31	Wolves in the Throne Room	Black Cascade	Black metal, dark ambient	Southern Lord	

== Second quarter ==
=== April ===
List of albums released in April 2009
Go to: January | February | March | April | May | June | July | August | September | October | November | December | Back to top
Release date	Artist	Album	Genre	Label	Ref.
April 1	BWO	Big Science	Pop	Bonnier Music	
April 1	Lacuna Coil	Shallow Life	Gothic metal, alternative metal, nu metal	Century Media, EMI	
April 1	El Perro del Mar	Love Is Not Pop	Pop	Licking Fingers	
April 3	Bat for Lashes	Two Suns	Art rock	Echo, Parlophone	
April 6	Crystal Antlers	Tentacles	Psychedelic rock, garage rock, punk rock	Touch and Go	
April 6	Doves	Kingdom of Rust	Indie rock	Heavenly	
April 6	Lady Sovereign	Jigsaw	Hip-hop, grime, electronica	EMI	
April 6	The Veils	Sun Gangs		Rough Trade	
April 7	Assemble Head in Sunburst Sound	When Sweet Sleep Returned	Psychedelic rock	Tee Pee	
April 7	Balkan Beat Box	Nu Made (Remixes)		JDub	
April 7	Band of Skulls	Baby Darling Doll Face Honey	Blues rock, indie rock, hard rock	Shangri-La Music	
April 7	Billy Ray Cyrus	Back to Tennessee	Country	Lyric Street	
April 7	Black Dice	Repo	Ambient music, electronic	Paw Tracks	
April 7	Bob Mould	Life and Times	Alternative rock	Anti-	
April 7	Casiotone for the Painfully Alone	Advance Base Battery Life		Tomlab	
April 7	The Coathangers	Scramble	Indie rock, post-punk revival	Suicide Squeeze	
April 7	The Ettes	Danger Is			
April 7	Jadakiss	The Last Kiss	East Coast hip-hop, hardcore	D-Block, Ruff Ryders, Roc-A-Fella	
April 7	Jason Aldean	Wide Open	Country, country rock	Broken Bow	
April 7	MercyMe	10	Rock	INO	
April 7	Metric	Fantasies	Indie rock, new wave	Metric Music International, Last Gang, Mom + Pop	
April 7	Mims	Guilt	Hip-hop, East Coast hip-hop, rap rock	Capitol, EMI	
April 7	Neil Young	Fork in the Road	Rock, folk rock	Reprise	
April 7	Rascal Flatts	Unstoppable	Country	Lyric Street	
April 7	The Thermals	Now We Can See	Indie rock, punk rock	Kill Rock Stars	
April 7	The Tragically Hip	We Are the Same	Alternative rock	Universal Music Canada	
April 9	Woods	Songs of Shame	Folk, psychedelic folk	Woodsist, Shrimper Records	
April 13	Soap&Skin	Lovetune for Vacuum	Experimental, dark wave, electronica	Couch Records, PIAS	
April 14	Agoraphobic Nosebleed	Agorapocalypse	Grindcore	Relapse	
April 14	Big Business	Mind the Drift	Heavy metal	Hydra Head	
April 14	Bill Callahan	Sometimes I Wish We Were an Eagle	Alternative country	Drag City	
April 14	The Boy Least Likely To	Law of the Playground	Indie pop	Too Young to Die	
April 14	Day26	Forever in a Day		Bad Boy, Atlantic	
April 14	Den Saakaldte	All Hail Pessimism			
April 14	Easy Star All-Stars	Easy Star's Lonely Hearts Dub Band	Reggae, dub	Easy Star	
April 14	Fastball	Little White Lies	Rock	RED	
April 14	Jill Sobule	California Years		Pinko Records	
April 14	The Juan MacLean	The Future Will Come	House, nu-disco	DFA	
April 14	k-os	Yes!	Alternative hip-hop	Universal Music Canada	
April 14	The Last Vegas	Whatever Gets You Off	Hard rock, glam metal, heavy metal	Eleven Seven Music	
April 14	Prefuse 73	Everything She Touched Turned Ampexian	Electronic	Warp	
April 14	Screaming Females	Power Move	Indie rock, punk rock	Don Giovanni	
April 14	Silversun Pickups	Swoon	Alternative rock, shoegaze	Dangerbird	
April 14	Willie Nile	House of a Thousand Guitars	Rock	River House Records	
April 17	Depeche Mode	Sounds of the Universe	Synth-pop, electro-rock	Mute	
April 17	Eluveitie	Evocation I: The Arcane Dominion	Acoustic rock, folk rock, Celtic rock	Nuclear Blast	
April 17	Hardline	Leaving the End Open	Hard rock	Frontiers	
April 20	Art Brut	Art Brut vs. Satan	Indie rock, art punk, garage rock	Downtown, Cooking Vinyl	
April 20	Asher Roth	Asleep in the Bread Aisle	Pop rap	School Boy, SRC, Universal Motown	
April 20	Camera Obscura	My Maudlin Career	Indie pop	4AD	
April 20	Chimaira	The Infection	Groove metal, metalcore	Ferret, Nuclear Blast	
April 20	Earth Crisis	To the Death	Metalcore	Century Media	
April 20	Fightstar	Be Human	Alternative rock, symphonic rock, post-hardcore	Search and Destroy Records, PIAS	
April 20	Jeffrey Lewis and the Junkyard	'Em Are I	Anti-folk	Rough Trade	
April 20	King Creosote	Flick the Vs	Indie folk	Domino, Fence	
April 21	As Cities Burn	Hell or High Water	Indie rock	Tooth & Nail	
April 21	Bearfoot	Doors and Windows	Bluegrass, Americana	Compass	
April 21	Chester French	Love the Future	Indie pop, futurepop, synth-pop	Star Trak, Interscope	
April 21	The Horrors	Primary Colours	Shoegaze, post-punk revival, gothic rock	XL	
April 21	Isis	Wavering Radiant	Post-metal, sludge metal, progressive metal	Ipecac	
April 21	Jars of Clay	The Long Fall Back to Earth	Christian rock, electronic pop, pop rock	Gray Matters, Essential	
April 21	Manchester Orchestra	Mean Everything to Nothing	Indie rock, alternative rock	Favorite Gentlemen Recordings	
April 21	Meg & Dia	Here, Here and Here	Alternative rock, indie rock, indie pop	Warner Bros., Sire	
April 21	Mr. Lif	I Heard It Today	Hip-hop	Bloodbot Tactical Enterprises	
April 21	Rick Ross	Deeper Than Rap	Hip-hop	Maybach, Slip-n-Slide, Def Jam	
April 21	Tinted Windows	Tinted Windows	Alternative rock, power pop	S-Curve	
April 24	Heaven & Hell	The Devil You Know	Heavy metal	Rhino, Roadrunner	
April 25	Serebro	OpiumRoz	Electronic rock	Monolit Records	
April 27	The Enemy	Music for the People	Indie rock, punk rock	Warner Bros.	
April 27	OSI	Blood	Progressive metal	Inside Out Music	
April 27	Tiga	Ciao!		Turbo Recordings, PIAS	
April 28	Ben Folds	Ben Folds Presents: University A Cappella!	A cappella	Sony Music	
April 28	Bob Dylan	Together Through Life	Folk rock, blues rock	Columbia	
April 28	Halestorm	Halestorm	Hard rock, post-grunge	Atlantic	
April 28	Immaculate Machine	High on Jackson Hill	Indie rock	Mint	
April 28	Japandroids	Post-Nothing	Indie rock, noise rock	Unfamiliar Records	
April 28	Julian Marley	Awake	Reggae	Universal, Tuff Gong	
April 28	Kevin Devine	Brother's Blood	Indie rock, alternative rock	Favorite Gentlemen Recordings, Big Scary Monsters	
April 28	Mike Jones	The Voice	Hip-hop	Ice Age, Asylum	
April 28	NOFX	Coaster	Punk rock, skate punk	Fat Wreck Chords	
April 28	Patrick Watson	Wooden Arms	Dream pop, psychedelic folk	Secret City	
April 28	Pilot Speed	Wooden Bones	Rock	MapleMusic, Wind-up	
April 28	Tech N9ne	Sickology 101	Hip-hop	Strange Music	
April 28	Thee Oh Sees	Help	Alternative rock, garage rock, noise rock	In the Red	
April 28	Wyrd	Kalivägi			
April 30	Nek	Un'altra direzione	Pop rock, soft rock	Warner Music	

=== May ===
List of albums released in May 2009
Go to: January | February | March | April | May | June | July | August | September | October | November | December | Back to top
Release date	Artist	Album	Genre	Label	Ref.
May 1	Madina Lake	Attics to Eden	Alternative rock, post-hardcore	Roadrunner	
May 1	Peaches	I Feel Cream	Electroclash, synth-pop, electropunk	XL	
May 2	Gallows	Grey Britain	Hardcore punk, metalcore	Warner Bros.	
May 3	Ciara	Fantasy Ride	R&B	Jive, LaFace, Sony Music	
May 4	Fischerspooner	Entertainment	Electropop		
May 4	The Maccabees	Wall of Arms	Indie rock	Fiction	
May 5	Akron/Family	Set 'Em Wild, Set 'Em Free	Experimental rock, indie folk	Dead Oceans	
May 5	The Chariot	Wars and Rumors of Wars	Metalcore, mathcore	Solid State	
May 5	Chrisette Michele	Epiphany	R&B	Def Jam	
May 5	Conor Oberst and the Mystic Valley Band	Outer South	Folk rock, indie rock, Americana	Merge	
May 5	Cracker	Sunrise in the Land of Milk and Honey	Alternative rock	429	
May 5	The Dangerous Summer	Reach for the Sun	Pop-punk, alternative rock	Hopeless	
May 5	Decyfer Down	Crash	Post-grunge, alternative metal, Christian rock	INO	
May 5	The Devil Wears Prada	With Roots Above and Branches Below	Metalcore	Ferret Music	
May 5	Hatebreed	For the Lions	Metalcore, hardcore punk, groove metal	Koch	
May 5	New York Dolls	Cause I Sez So	Garage rock	Atco	
May 5	Newsboys	In the Hands of God	Christian rock, pop rock	Inpop	
May 5	Psychostick	Sandwich	Comedy rock, metalcore, hardcore punk	Rock Ridge Music	
May 5	Sadat X	Brand New Bein'	Hip-hop	Ground Original, Cold Heat Entertainment	
May 5	St. Vincent	Actor	Baroque pop, indie pop, progressive pop	4AD	
May 5	Years	Years	Instrumental, post-rock	Arts & Crafts	
May 5	Yusuf Islam	Roadsinger	Folk rock	Island	
May 5	Zao	Awake?	Metalcore	Ferret Music	
May 8	Epica	The Classical Conspiracy	Symphonic death metal, neoclassical metal	Nuclear Blast	
May 11	In Case of Fire	Align the Planets	Progressive rock, alternative rock, new prog	Search and Destroy Records	
May 11	Marmaduke Duke	Duke Pandemonium	Alternative rock, dance-pop, funk	14th Floor	
May 11	Maxïmo Park	Quicken the Heart	Alternative rock, indie rock, post-punk revival	Warp	
May 11	Moderat	Moderat	Electronic, minimal techno, IDM	BPitch Control	
May 12	Aiden	Knives	Horror punk, melodic hardcore	Victory	
May 12	Cam'ron	Crime Pays	Hip-hop	Diplomat, Asylum, Warner Bros.	
May 12	The Crystal Method	Divided by Night	Electronica	Tiny e Records	
May 12	Meat Puppets	Sewn Together	Alternative rock	Megaforce	
May 12	Paul Wall	Fast Life	Hip-hop, Southern hip-hop	Swishahouse, Asylum	
May 12	Steve Earle	Townes	Folk	New West	
May 12	Tanya Morgan	Brooklynati	Hip-hop	Interdependent Media	
May 13	Dead by April	Dead by April	Metalcore, melodic death metal, alternative metal	Universal	
May 15	Coldplay	LeftRightLeftRightLeft	Alternative rock	Capitol, Parlophone	
May 15	Eminem	Relapse	Horrorcore, hip-hop	Aftermath	
May 15	Green Day	21st Century Breakdown	Pop-punk, alternative rock, punk rock	Reprise	
May 15	Passion Pit	Manners	Electropop, synth-pop	Frenchkiss	
May 18	Deerhunter	Rainwater Cassette Exchange	Garage rock, indie rock, psychedelia	Kranky, 4AD	
May 18	Kate Voegele	A Fine Mess	Pop, pop rock	MySpace, Interscope	
May 18	Madness	The Liberty of Norton Folgate	Ska, pop, reggae	Lucky Seven, Yep Roc	
May 18	Manic Street Preachers	Journal for Plague Lovers	Post-punk, alternative rock	Columbia	
May 18	Old Man's Child	Slaves of the World	Symphonic black metal	Century Media	
May 18	Sunn O)))	Monoliths & Dimensions	Drone metal, avant-garde, dark ambient	Southern Lord	
May 19	Apostle of Hustle	Eats Darkness	Indie rock	Arts & Crafts	
May 19	Busta Rhymes	Back on My B.S.	East Coast hip-hop, hardcore hip-hop	Universal Motown	
May 19	Carbon Leaf	Nothing Rhymes with Woman		Vanguard	
May 19	CKY	Carver City	Alternative metal, stoner metal, alternative rock	Roadrunner	
May 19	Diane Birch	Bible Belt	Soul, blues	S-Curve	
May 19	DJ Drama	Gangsta Grillz: The Album (Vol. 2)	Hip-hop	Grand Hustle, Atlantic	
May 19	Family Force 5	Dance or Die with a Vengeance	Crunkcore, Christian rock, Dance	Transparent Media Group	
May 19	IAMX	Kingdom of Welcome Addiction	Electronic rock, industrial rock, dark cabaret	Metropolis, 61Seconds Records	
May 19	Iron & Wine	Around the Well	Folk rock	Sub Pop	
May 19	Mat Kearney	City of Black & White	Rock, pop	Aware, Columbia	
May 19	Method Man & Redman	Blackout! 2	Hip-hop	Def Jam	
May 19	MewithoutYou	It's All Crazy! It's All False! It's All a Dream! It's Alright		Tooth & Nail	
May 19	Ruben Studdard	Love Is		Hickory	
May 19	Tori Amos	Abnormally Attracted to Sin		Universal Republic	
May 19	The Warlocks	The Mirror Explodes		Tee Pee	
May 19	White Rabbits	It's Frightening	Indie rock	TBD, Mute	
May 19	Zee Avi	Zee Avi	Indie, pop, jazz	Brushfire, Monotone Records	
May 20	Marilyn Manson	The High End of Low	Glam rock, industrial metal	Interscope	
May 21	Cluster	Qua	Krautrock, electronic	Nepenthe Music	
May 22	Esmée Denters	Outta Here	Synth-pop, R&B	Interscope, Tennman	
May 22	Miike Snow	Miike Snow	Indie pop, electropop	Downtown	
May 25	1349	Revelations of the Black Flame	Black metal, avant-garde metal	Candlelight	
May 25	Devin Townsend	Ki	Progressive rock, jazz rock	HevyDevy Records	
May 25	The Field	Yesterday and Today	Techno	Kompakt	
May 25	Iggy Pop	Préliminaires	Jazz, rock, blues	Astralwerks, Virgin	
May 25	Phoenix	Wolfgang Amadeus Phoenix	Indie pop, synth-pop, new wave	V2, Loyauté, Glassnote	
May 26	Black Moth Super Rainbow	Eating Us		Graveface	
May 26	Electrik Red	How to Be a Lady: Volume 1	R&B	Radio Killa, Def Jam	
May 26	Eros Ramazzotti	Ali e radici	Pop, rock	Sony BMG	
May 26	Grizzly Bear	Veckatimest	Indie rock, psychedelic folk, folk rock	Warp	
May 26	Hayden	The Place Where We Lived	Acoustic rock, indie folk, alternative country	Hardwood, Universal Music Canada	
May 26	Khanate	Clean Hands Go Foul	Drone metal, doom metal	Hydra Head	
May 26	Mandy Moore	Amanda Leigh		Storefront Records, RED	
May 26	Minsk	With Echoes in the Movement of Stone	Post-metal, doom metal	Relapse	
May 26	Sharon Van Etten	Because I Was in Love	Indie rock, folk	Language of Stone Records	
May 26	Wisin & Yandel	La Revolución	Reggaeton, R&B, electropop	WY, Machete	
May 27	Amorphis	Skyforger	Melodic death metal, power metal, heavy metal	Nuclear Blast	
May 28	Rock Plaza Central	...At the Moment of Our Most Needing	Indie rock	Paper Bag	
May 29	Eskimo Joe	Inshalla	Alternative rock	Warner	

=== June ===
List of albums released in June 2009
Go to: January | February | March | April | May | June | July | August | September | October | November | December | Back to top
Release date	Artist	Album	Genre	Label	Ref.
June 1	Cass McCombs	Catacombs	Alternative rock, folk	Domino	
June 1	Daniel Merriweather	Love & War	R&B, pop, soul	Columbia, Marlin Records	
June 1	Patrick Wolf	The Bachelor	Indietronica, folktronica, electronica	Bloody Chamber Music	
June 1	Rancid	Let the Dominoes Fall	Punk rock, ska punk	Hellcat, Epitaph	
June 2	311	Uplifter	Alternative rock, reggae rock	Volcano	
June 2	Dave Matthews Band	Big Whiskey & the GrooGrux King	Alternative rock	RCA	
June 2	Eels	Hombre Lobo	Rock	Vagrant	
June 2	Emery	...In Shallow Seas We Sail	Post-hardcore, screamo	Tooth & Nail	
June 2	Fat Freddy's Drop	Dr Boondigga and the Big BW	Dub	The Drop	
June 2	The Sounds	Crossing the Rubicon	New wave, post-punk revival	Arnioki Records, Original Signal Records	
June 2	Taking Back Sunday	New Again	Alternative rock, pop rock, pop-punk	Warner Bros.	
June 3	Black Eyed Peas	The E.N.D.	Pop, hip-hop, EDM	Interscope	
June 3	Miley Cyrus (Hannah Montana)	Hannah Montana 3	Country pop, pop rock	Walt Disney	
June 3	Titãs	Sacos Plásticos	Pop rock	Arsenal Music	
June 5	Chickenfoot	Chickenfoot	Hard rock, blues rock, heavy metal	Redline, earMUSIC, WHD Entertainment	
June 5	Karnivool	Sound Awake	Progressive rock, alternative metal	Cymatic Records	
June 5	Kasabian	West Ryder Pauper Lunatic Asylum	Indie rock, psychedelic rock, space rock	RCA	
June 5	Little Boots	Hands	Electropop	679, Atlantic	
June 8	Datarock	Red	Dance-punk, funk, nu-disco	Young Aspiring Professionals	
June 8	Placebo	Battle for the Sun	Alternative rock	PIAS	
June 8	Steel Panther	Feel the Steel	Glam metal, heavy metal, comedy rock	Universal	
June 9	Anti-Flag	The People or the Gun	Punk rock	SideOneDummy	
June 9	The Autumn Offering	Requiem	Metalcore	Victory	
June 9	Busdriver	Jhelli Beam	Hip-hop	Anti-	
June 9	The Clarks	Restless Days	Rock	High Wire Music	
June 9	Coalesce	OX	Metalcore, mathcore	Relapse	
June 9	Dirty Projectors	Bitte Orca	Indie rock, art pop	Domino	
June 9	Dredg	The Pariah, the Parrot, the Delusion	Alternative rock, progressive rock, experimental rock	Ohlone Recordings, Independent Label	
June 9	Elvis Costello	Secret, Profane & Sugarcane	Americana, country folk, country rock	Hear Music, Universal	
June 9	For Today	Portraits	Metalcore	Facedown	
June 9	The Friday Night Boys	Off the Deep End	Power pop, pop-punk	Fueled by Ramen	
June 9	Grand Puba	Retroactive	Hip-hop	Babygrande	
June 9	Little Boots	Illuminations	Synth-pop, nu-disco, dance-pop	Elektra	
June 9	Mos Def	The Ecstatic	Conscious rap, alternative hip-hop	Downtown	
June 9	Nanci Griffith	The Loving Kind	Folk, country	Rounder	
June 9	Nosaj Thing	Drift	Electronic	Alpha Pup	
June 9	A Skylit Drive	Adelphia	Post-hardcore, screamo	Fearless	
June 9	Sonic Youth	The Eternal	Indie rock, experimental rock	Matador	
June 9	There for Tomorrow	A Little Faster	Alternative rock, pop-punk, emo	Hopeless	
June 9	Todd Snider	The Excitement Plan	Alternative country	Yep Roc	
June 9	Trailer Choir	Off the Hillbilly Hook	Country	Show Dog Nashville	
June 9	Tune-Yards	Bird-Brains	Lo-fi	Marriage, 4AD	
June 11	Ashley Tisdale	Guilty Pleasure	Pop rock	Warner Bros.	
June 11	Idlewild	Post Electric Blues	Indie rock	Cooking Vinyl	
June 12	A-ha	Foot of the Mountain	Synth-pop	We Love Music, Polydor, Universal	
June 12	Hilltop Hoods	State of the Art	Australian hip-hop	Golden Era	
June 12	Jonas Brothers	Lines, Vines and Trying Times	Pop rock	Hollywood	
June 15	Magnum	Into the Valley of the Moonking	Rock	SPV	
June 15	The Proclaimers	Notes & Rhymes	Alternative rock, pop, Celtic rock	W14 Music	
June 15	Spinnerette	Spinnerette	Alternative rock, indie rock	Anthem, Hassle Records	
June 15	We Were Promised Jetpacks	These Four Walls	Indie rock, post-punk revival, folk rock	Fat Cat	
June 16	Andrew Cyrille, Paul Dunmall, and Henry Grimes	Opus de Life	Free jazz	Porter	
June 16	Christian McBride	Kind of Brown	Jazz	Mack Avenue	
June 16	Everyday Sunday	Best Night of Our Lives	Christian rock	Inpop	
June 16	Major Lazer	Guns Don't Kill People... Lazers Do	EDM, dancehall, reggae	Downtown	
June 16	Spinal Tap	Back from the Dead	Comedy rock, heavy metal	Spuzzle Records, Polymer Records	
June 16	Street Sweeper Social Club	Street Sweeper Social Club	Rap rock, alternative rock, funk rock	Warner Bros.	
June 19	Gossip	Music for Men	Indie rock, garage rock, dance-punk	Columbia	
June 19	Riverside	Anno Domini High Definition	Progressive rock, progressive metal, jazz fusion	Mystic Production, Inside Out Music, SPV	
June 19	The Temper Trap	Conditions	Indie rock, indie pop	Liberation Music, Infectious, Glassnote	
June 19	VNV Nation	Of Faith, Power and Glory	Futurepop, electro-industrial, electropop	Anachron Records	
June 22	Amazing Baby	Rewild	Indie rock	Shangri-La Music, Cooperative Music	
June 22	Future of the Left	Travels with Myself and Another	Post-hardcore, noise rock	4AD	
June 22	Jack Peñate	Everything Is New	Indie rock	XL	
June 22	White Denim	Fits	Indie rock, psychedelic rock	Downtown, Full Time Hobby	
June 23	Alexisonfire	Old Crows / Young Cardinals	Post-hardcore	Dine Alone	
June 23	Cheap Trick	The Latest	Hard rock, power pop	Cheap Trick Unlimited	
June 23	The Cliks	Dirty King	Alternative rock	Warner Bros., Tommy Boy	
June 23	Darkest Hour	The Eternal Return	Melodic death metal	Victory	
June 23	The Dear Hunter	Act III: Life and Death	Progressive rock, symphonic rock, experimental rock	Triple Crown	
June 23	Deer Tick	Born on Flag Day	Indie rock, alternative country	Partisan	
June 23	Dinosaur Jr.	Farm	Alternative rock	Jagjaguwar	
June 23	Dream Theater	Black Clouds & Silver Linings	Progressive metal, progressive rock	Roadrunner	
June 23	Ginuwine	A Man's Thoughts	R&B, soul, hip-hop	Notifi Records, Asylum, Warner Bros.	
June 23	Hit the Lights	Coast to Coast	Pop-punk, easycore	Triple Crown	
June 23	Jay Brannan	In Living Cover	Folk, acoustic	Great Depression Records, Nettwerk	
June 23	The Lemonheads	Varshons	Alternative rock, punk rock	The End	
June 23	The Mars Volta	Octahedron	Progressive rock, experimental rock	Warner Bros., Mercury	
June 23	Maylene and the Sons of Disaster	III	Heavy metal, Southern metal	Ferret Music	
June 23	Paulina Rubio	Gran City Pop	Latin pop, dance-pop	Universal Music Latino	
June 23	Pete Yorn	Back and Fourth	Alternative rock	Columbia	
June 23	The Phenomenal Handclap Band	The Phenomenal Handclap Band		Friendly Fire, Tummy Touch	
June 23	Reverie Sound Revue	Reverie Sound Revue	Indie rock	Boompa	
June 23	Regina Spektor	Far	Anti-folk, indie rock	Sire	
June 23	Serengeti and Polyphonic	Terradactyl	Hip-hop	Anticon	
June 23	Soul Assassins	Intermission	Hip-hop	Gold Dust Media	
June 23	Sunset Rubdown	Dragonslayer	Indie rock	Jagjaguwar	
June 23	Tortoise	Beacons of Ancestorship	Post-rock	Thrill Jockey	
June 23	U-God	Dopium	Hip-hop	Frank Radio, Babygrande	
June 24	Ringo Sheena	Sanmon Gossip	Jazz pop	Virgin	
June 26	La Roux	La Roux	Synth-pop	Polydor	
June 29	Anaal Nathrakh	In the Constellation of the Black Widow	Black metal, grindcore, industrial metal	Candlelight, FETO Records	
June 29	Moby	Wait for Me	Downtempo, ambient, electronica	Little Idiot Records, Mute	
June 29	Tinariwen	Imidiwan: Companions	Desert blues, folk, world	Independiente	
June 30	Ace Hood	Ruthless	Hip-hop	We the Best, Def Jam	
June 30	Brad Paisley	American Saturday Night	Country	Arista Nashville	
June 30	Killswitch Engage	Killswitch Engage	Metalcore	Roadrunner	
June 30	Levon Helm	Electric Dirt	Americana	Vanguard	
June 30	Maino	If Tomorrow Comes...	Hip-hop	Hustle Hard Records, Atlantic	
June 30	Mark Karan	Walk Through the Fire	Rock	Quacktone Records, DIG Music	
June 30	Obituary	Darkest Day	Death metal	Candlelight	
June 30	Rob Thomas	Cradlesong	Pop rock	Atlantic	
June 30	Suicide Silence	No Time to Bleed	Deathcore	Century Nedia	
June 30	Tanya Tucker	My Turn	Country	Saguaro Road	
June 30	Wilco	Wilco	Alternative country	Nonesuch	

== Third quarter ==
=== July ===
List of albums released in July 2009
Go to: January | February | March | April | May | June | July | August | September | October | November | December | Back to top
Release date	Artist	Album	Genre	Label	Ref.
July 3	Cascada	Evacuate the Dancefloor	Eurodance, dance-pop, electropop	Zooland	
July 3	Florence and the Machine	Lungs	Indie pop, art rock, baroque pop	Island	
July 3	Suffocation	Blood Oath	Technical death metal	Nuclear Blast	
July 4	Atmosphere	Leak at Will	Hip-hop, alternative hip-hop	Rhymesayers	
July 6	Slow Club	Yeah So	Indie pop	Moshi Moshi	
July 7	The Alchemist	Chemical Warfare	Hip-hop	ALC Records, E1 Music	
July 7	All Time Low	Nothing Personal	Emo pop, pop-punk	Hopeless	
July 7	Big D and the Kids Table	Fluent in Stroll	Dub, ska, reggae	SideOneDummy	
July 7	Born of Osiris	A Higher Place	Deathcore, progressive metal	Sumerian	
July 7	Cage	Depart from Me	Rap rock, horrorcore	Definitive Jux	
July 7	Céu	Vagarosa		Urban Jungle, Six Degrees	
July 7	The Crimson Armada	Guardians	Melodic death metal, metalcore, deathcore	Metal Blade	
July 7	Death by Stereo	Death Is My Only Friend	Heavy metal, hardcore punk	Serjical Strike	
July 7	Drive-By Truckers	Live from Austin, TX		New West	
July 7	Job for a Cowboy	Ruination	Death metal	Metal Blade	
July 7	LMFAO	Party Rock	Pop, dance-pop, EDM	will.i.am Music, Cherrytree Records, Interscope	
July 7	Marcy Playground	Leaving Wonderland... in a Fit of Rage	Alternative rock	Woz Records	
July 7	Maxwell	BLACKsummers'night	R&B, neo soul, funk	Columbia	
July 7	Novembers Doom	Into Night's Requiem Infernal	Death-doom, progressive death metal, gothic metal	The End	
July 7	Oneida	Rated O	Alternative rock, indie rock, psychedelic rock	Jagjaguwar	
July 7	Poison the Well	The Tropic Rot	Post-hardcore	Ferret	
July 7	Son Volt	American Central Dust	Americana, alternative country	Rounder	
July 7	Stellastarr	Civilized	Indie rock, post-punk	Bloated Wife Records	
July 10	Billy Talent	Billy Talent III	Post-punk, post-hardcore, punk rock	Warner Music Canada, Roadrunner	
July 13	Clark	Totems Flare	IDM, experimental, electro	Warp	
July 13	Clutch	Strange Cousins from the West	Stoner rock, blues rock	Weathermaker Music	
July 13	He Is Legend	It Hates You	Hard rock, stoner rock, alternative rock	LAB, Tragic Hero	
July 13	Judas Priest	A Touch of Evil: Live	Heavy metal	Sony Music, Epic	
July 13	The Rumble Strips	Welcome to the Walk Alone	Rock	Island	
July 13	V V Brown	Travelling Like the Light		Island	
July 14	Adelitas Way	Adelitas Way	Alternative metal, hard rock, post-grunge	Virgin	
July 14	Arkaea	Years in the Darkness	Metalcore, groove metal, industrial metal	eOne	
July 14	Arsonists Get All the Girls	Portals	Progressive metalcore, deathcore	Century Media	
July 14	August Burns Red	Constellations	Melodic metalcore	Solid State	
July 14	Brooke White	High Hopes & Heartbreak	Folk-pop	June Baby Records	
July 14	Daughtry	Leave This Town	Post-grunge	RCA	
July 14	The Dead Weather	Horehound	Garage rock, blues rock	Third Man, Warner Bros.	
July 14	DevilDriver	Pray for Villains	Groove metal, melodic death metal	Roadrunner	
July 14	John Forté	Stylefree the EP			
July 14	Krizz Kaliko	Genius	Alternative hip-hop, R&B	Strange Music	
July 14	The Most Serene Republic	...And the Ever Expanding Universe	Indie rock	Arts & Crafts	
July 14	Mount Eerie	Wind's Poem	Indie folk, dark ambient, lo-fi	P.W. Elverum & Sun, Ltd.	
July 14	Owl City	Ocean Eyes	Synth-pop, electronica	Universal Republic	
July 14	Project 86	Picket Fence Cartel	Post-hardcore, alternative metal	Tooth & Nail	
July 14	pureNRG	The Real Thing	CCM, pop	Fervent	
July 14	Sick Puppies	Tri-Polar	Alternative metal, nu metal, post-grunge	Virgin	
July 17	Ana Popović	Blind for Love	Electric blues, blues rock, jazz	Eclecto Groove	
July 17	Jordin Sparks	Battlefield	Pop, R&B	Jive	
July 20	Jónsi & Alex	Riceboy Sleeps	Ambient	Parlophone, EMI	
July 21	Awol One and Factor Chandelier	Owl Hours	Hip-hop	Fake Four Inc.	
July 21	Civil Twilight	Civil Twilight	Indie rock, alternative rock	Wind-up	
July 21	Demi Lovato	Here We Go Again	Rock, power pop	Hollywood	
July 21	Eyedea & Abilities	By the Throat	Hip-hop	Rhymesayers	
July 21	The Fiery Furnaces	I'm Going Away	Indie rock	Thrill Jockey	
July 21	For the Fallen Dreams	Relentless	Metalcore	Rise	
July 21	Matthew Sweet and Susanna Hoffs	Under the Covers, Vol. 2	Rock	Shout!	
July 21	Our Lady Peace	Burn Burn	Alternative rock	Coalition Entertainment	
July 21	Portugal. The Man	The Satanic Satanist	Psychedelic pop	Equal Vision	
July 21	Rx Bandits	Mandala	Progressive rock	Sargent House	
July 21	Set Your Goals	This Will Be the Death of Us	Pop-punk	Epitaph	
July 21	Sugar Ray	Music for Cougars	Pop rock	Pulse Recordings	
July 21	Wye Oak	The Knot	Indie rock	Merge	
July 27	Cornershop	Judy Sucks a Lemon for Breakfast	Indie pop, indie rock, raga rock	Ample Play Records	
July 28	Divine Heresy	Bringer of Plagues	Metalcore, death metal, groove metal	Century Media, Roadrunner	
July 28	Fabolous	Loso's Way	Hip-hop	Desert Storm, Def Jam	
July 28	George Thorogood and the Destroyers	The Dirty Dozen	Blues rock, boogie rock	EMI America	
July 28	Kristinia DeBarge	Exposed	Pop, R&B	Island, Sodapop Records	
July 31	Frankmusik	Complete Me	Electropop, synth-pop, dance-pop	Island	

=== August ===
List of albums released in August 2009
Go to: January | February | March | April | May | June | July | August | September | October | November | December | Back to top
Release date	Artist	Album	Genre	Label	Ref.
August 3	Bap Kennedy	Howl On	Country rock	Lonely Street Discs	
August 3	Enochian Theory	Evolution: Creatio Ex Nihilio	Progressive rock	Mascot	
August 3	The Twang	Jewellery Quarter	Indie rock	B-Unique	
August 3	Wild Beasts	Two Dancers	Indie rock, art rock, dream pop	Domino	
August 4	Amanda Blank	I Love You	Dirty rap, Baltimore club, electropop	Downtown	
August 4	Anchor & Braille	Felt	Acoustic rock, baroque pop, folk	Wood Water Records	
August 4	Fruit Bats	The Ruminant Band	Folk rock	Sub Pop	
August 4	Gloriana	Gloriana	Country	Reprise Nashville, Warner Bros. Nashville	
August 4	Jay Reatard	Watch Me Fall	Garage rock, indie rock, power pop	Matador	
August 4	Julian Plenti	Julian Plenti Is... Skyscraper	Alternative rock, art rock	Matador	
August 4	Modest Mouse	No One's First, and You're Next	Alternative rock	Epic	
August 4	Nightmare of You	Infomaniac	Indie rock	The Bevonshire Label, Brookvale Records	
August 4	Touché Amoré	...To the Beat of a Dead Horse	Post-hardcore, melodic hardcore, screamo	6131 Records	
August 4	Yim Yames	Tribute To	Pop	ATO	
August 5	Mutemath	Armistice	Alternative rock, post-rock	Teleprompt, Warner Bros.	
August 5	OOIOO	Armonico Hewa	Psychedelic rock	Commmons, Shock City	
August 6	Oneohtrix Point Never	Zones Without People	Ambient	Arbor Recordings	
August 7	Behemoth	Evangelion	Blackened death metal	Nuclear Blast, Metal Blade	
August 9	Thrice	Beggars	Experimental rock, post-hardcore, alternative rock	Vagrant	
August 10	Jessie James	Jessie James	Country, pop	Mercury	
August 11	Britt Nicole	The Lost Get Found	Christian rock, Christian hip-hop	Sparrow	
August 11	Cobra Starship	Hot Mess	Dance-pop, synth-pop, alternative rock	Fueled by Ramen, Decaydance, Columbia	
August 11	Dan Mangan	Nice, Nice, Very Nice	Indie rock	Arts & Crafts	
August 11	George Strait	Twang	Country	MCA Nashville	
August 11	Justin Moore	Justin Moore	Country, country rock	Valory	
August 11	Robert Cray	This Time	Blues	Vanguard, Nozzle Records	
August 11	Slaughterhouse	Slaughterhouse	Hardcore hip-hop	eOne	
August 11	Winds of Plague	The Great Stone War	Deathcore, symphonic metal	Century Media	
August 14	Calvin Harris	Ready for the Weekend	Dance	Fly Eye, Columbia	
August 14	Sparks	The Seduction of Ingmar Bergman	pop opera	Lil' Beethoven	
August 14	The xx	xx	Indie pop, dream pop, indie rock	Young Turks	
August 15	Dappled Cities	Zounds	Alternative rock	Speak 'n Spell, Dangerbird	
August 17	Mew	No More Stories...	Alternative rock, indie rock, progressive rock	Evil Office Records, Columbia	
August 17	Simian Mobile Disco	Temporary Pleasure	Electronic, tech house	Wichita	
August 17	Soulsavers	Broken	Electronica, alternative rock, gospel	V2, Cooperative Music	
August 17	Squarepusher	Solo Electric Bass 1	Jazz	Warp	
August 18	As Tall as Lions	You Can't Take It with You	Indie rock	Triple Crown	
August 18	Brendan Benson	My Old, Familiar Friend	Rock	ATO	
August 18	Broadway Calls	Good Views, Bad News	Pop-punk, punk rock	SideOneDummy	
August 18	David Nail	I'm About to Come Alive	Country	MCA Nashville	
August 18	Dawes	North Hills	Folk rock	ATO	
August 18	Gwar	Lust in Space	Thrash metal, heavy metal, comedy rock	Metal Blade	
August 18	Ledisi	Turn Me Loose		Verve	
August 18	Otep	Smash the Control Machine		Victory	
August 18	Ramona Falls	Intuit	Indie rock	Barsuk	
August 18	Reba McEntire	Keep On Loving You	Country	Starstruck, Valory	
August 18	Sean Paul	Imperial Blaze	Dancehall	Atlantic	
August 18	Shiloh	Picture Imperfect	Pop-punk, pop rock	Universal Music Canada	
August 18	Terence Blanchard	Choices	Jazz	Concord Jazz, Universal Music Group International	
August 18	Third Eye Blind	Ursa Major	Rock, alternative rock	Mega Collider	
August 18	Various artists	Inglourious Basterds		A Band Apart, Maverick, Warner Bros.	
August 19	Arctic Monkeys	Humbug	Hard rock, stoner rock, psychedelic rock	Domino	
August 19	Colbie Caillat	Breakthrough	Pop, pop rock	Universal Republic	
August 19	Jet	Shaka Rock	Hard rock	Virgin, Real Horrorshow Records	
August 21	Kisschasy	Seizures	Pop rock, alternative rock	Below Par	
August 21	Zoot Woman	Things Are What They Used to Be	Synth-pop	Zoot Woman Records	
August 24	Athlete	Black Swan	Pop	Fiction	
August 24	David Guetta	One Love	House	Virgin, EMI, Astralwerks	
August 24	Imogen Heap	Ellipse	Electronica, ambient	Megaphonic, RCA Victor	
August 24	LeToya	Lady Love		Capitol	
August 25	Blitzen Trapper	Black River Killer	Alternative country	Sub Pop	
August 25	Caliban	Say Hello to Tragedy	Metalcore	Century Media	
August 25	Collective Soul	Collective Soul (Rabbit)	Alternative rock, hard rock, post-grunge	Loud & Proud, Roadrunner	
August 25	fun.	Aim and Ignite	Baroque pop, indie pop	Nettwerk	
August 25	Hockey	Mind Chaos	Indie rock, dance-punk	Capitol	
August 25	Ingrid Michaelson	Everybody	Indie pop	Cabin 24 Records	
August 25	Jack Ingram	Big Dreams & High Hopes	Country	Big Machine	
August 25	Leeland	Love Is on the Move	Christian rock	Reunion, Essential	
August 25	Matisyahu	Light	Reggae fusion, hip-hop	Epic, JDub, Or Music	
August 25	Matt Redman	We Shall Not Be Shaken	CCM, worship	Sparrow, sixsteps	
August 25	Municipal Waste	Massive Aggressive	Crossover thrash	Earache	
August 25	Needtobreathe	The Outsiders	Alternative rock, Christian rock, Southern rock	Atlantic	
August 25	Oh, Sleeper	Son of the Morning	Metalcore	Solid State	
August 25	Queen Latifah	Persona		Flavor Unit	
August 25	Robert Glasper	Double-Booked		Blue Note	
August 25	Sidewalk Prophets	These Simple Truths	Christian music	Word, Curb	
August 25	Skillet	Awake	Christian metal, hard rock, alternative metal	Atlantic	
August 25	Still Life Still	Girls Come Too			
August 25	Young Galaxy	Invisible Republic	Indie rock	Fontana North	
August 28	A Fine Frenzy	Bomb in a Birdcage		Virgin	
August 28	Guilt Machine	On This Perfect Day	Progressive metal	Mascot	
August 28	Miley Cyrus	The Time of Our Lives	Pop rock	Hollywood	
August 28	Pitbull	Pitbull Starring in Rebelution	Hip house, electro hop, pop rap	J, Polo Grounds, Mr. 305	
August 28	Urthboy	Spitshine	Australian hip-hop	Elefant Traks	
August 28	Whitney Houston	I Look to You	Pop, soul	Arista	
August 31	3 Inches of Blood	Here Waits Thy Doom	Heavy metal, power metal	Century Media	
August 31	The Black Crowes	Before the Frost...Until the Freeze	Southern rock, blues rock, hard rock	Silver Arrow	
August 31	Chevelle	Sci-Fi Crimes	Alternative metal, hard rock	Epic	
August 31	Derek Webb	Stockholm Syndrome	Synth-pop, electronica, Christian music	INO	
August 31	Juliette Lewis	Terra Incognita	Rock	The End	
August 31	Noah and the Whale	The First Days of Spring	Indie folk	Vertigo, Cherrytree	
August 31	The Used	Artwork	Emo, alternative rock, post-hardcore	Reprise	
August 31	The Wildhearts	¡Chutzpah!	Hard rock, heavy metal, pop rock	Backstage Alliance	

=== September ===
List of albums released in September 2009
Go to: January | February | March | April | May | June | July | August | September | October | November | December | Back to top
Release date	Artist	Album	Genre	Label	Ref.
September 1	Andrew W.K.	55 Cadillac	New-age, rock	Ecstatic Peace!, Skyscraper Music Maker	
September 1	Beanie Sigel	The Broad Street Bully	Hip-hop	Siccness Records	
September 1	Chris Young	The Man I Want to Be	Neotraditional country, honky-tonk	RCA Nashville	
September 1	Insane Clown Posse	Bang! Pow! Boom!	Horrorcore	Psychopathic	
September 1	Jason Gray	Everything Sad Is Coming Untrue	CCM, folk rock	Centricity	
September 1	Skindred	Shark Bites and Dog Fights	Alternative metal, reggae rock, nu metal	Bieler Bros.	
September 1	Terri Clark	The Long Way Home	Country	Capitol Nashville	
September 1	They Might Be Giants	Here Comes Science	Children's, educational	Walt Disney	
September 2	Takida	The Darker Instinct	Post-grunge, pop rock	Se7en Records, Versity Rights	
September 7	The Cribs	Ignore the Ignorant	Indie rock, alternative rock	Wichita	
September 7	Frank Turner	Poetry of the Deed	Folk rock	Xtra Mile, Epitaph	
September 7	Jamie T	Kings & Queens	Indie rock, post-punk revival, hip-hop	Virgin, Tearbridge International	
September 7	The Orb	Baghdad Batteries (Orbsessions Volume III)	Electronica	Malicious Damage	
September 7	Raised Fist	Veil of Ignorance	Hardcore punk	Burning Heart	
September 8	BarlowGirl	Love & War	Christian rock	Fervent	
September 8	Boys Like Girls	Love Drunk	Pop-punk, pop rock, power pop	Columbia	
September 8	Circulatory System	Signal Morning	Psychedelic rock, noise rock	Cloud Recordings	
September 8	The Clean	Mister Pop	Indie pop	Merge, Arch Hill	
September 8	Cuff the Duke	Way Down Here	Alternative country, folk rock	Noble Recordings	
September 8	Infected Mushroom	Legend of the Black Shawarma	Psychedelic trance, trip hop, industrial	Perfecto, Hom-Mega Productions	
September 8	Jay-Z	The Blueprint 3	Hip-hop	Roc Nation, Atlantic	
September 8	Jim O'Rourke	The Visitor	Folk, orchestral pop, progressive rock	Drag City	
September 8	Os Mutantes	Haih or Amortecedor	Experimental rock, psychedelic rock, progressive rock	Anti-	
September 8	Phish	Joy		JEMP	
September 8	Polvo	In Prism	Indie rock, math rock, progressive rock	Merge	
September 8	Raekwon	Only Built 4 Cuban Linx... Pt. II	Hip-hop	Ice H2O, EMI	
September 8	Saosin	In Search of Solid Ground	Post-hardcore, alternative rock	Virgin	
September 8	Sonata Arctica	The Days of Grays	Power metal, symphonic metal, progressive metal	Nuclear Blast	
September 8	Sondre Lerche	Heartbeat Radio	Pop, rock	Rounder	
September 8	Thousand Foot Krutch	Welcome to the Masquerade	Christian metal, nu metal, alternative metal	Tooth & Nail	
September 8	Vivian Girls	Everything Goes Wrong	Indie rock	In the Red	
September 8	Yo La Tengo	Popular Songs	Indie rock	Matador	
September 9	Ensiferum	From Afar	Folk metal, melodic death metal, power metal	Spinefarm	
September 9	Europe	Last Look at Eden	Hard rock, blues rock	Universal	
September 11	Muse	The Resistance	Art rock, progressive rock, symphonic rock	Warner Bros., Helium-3	
September 11	Nelly Furtado	Mi Plan	Latin pop, pop rock	Nelstar Entertainment, Universal Music Latino	
September 11	No Angels	Welcome to the Dance		Polydor	
September 11	Pixie Lott	Turn It Up	Pop, R&B	Mercury	
September 14	The Big Pink	A Brief History of Love	Indie rock, noise pop	4AD	
September 14	David Gray	Draw the Line	Folk rock	Mercer Street, IHT	
September 14	Porcupine Tree	The Incident	Progressive rock, progressive metal	Roadrunner	
September 14	The Unthanks	Here's the Tender Coming	Folk	Rabble Rouser, Rough Trade, EMI	
September 15	Ace Frehley	Anomaly	Hard rock, heavy metal	Bronx Born Records	
September 15	Asking Alexandria	Stand Up and Scream	Metalcore	Sumerian	
September 15	The Black Dahlia Murder	Deflorate	Melodic death metal	Metal Blade	
September 15	The Dodos	Time to Die	Indie folk, Alternative rock	Frenchkiss	
September 15	Dying Fetus	Descend into Depravity	Technical death metal	Relapse	
September 15	Every Time I Die	New Junk Aesthetic	Southern rock, hardcore punk, metalcore	Epitaph	
September 15	It Dies Today	Lividity	Metalcore	Trustkill	
September 15	Kid Cudi	Man on the Moon: The End of Day	Alternative hip-hop, psychedelia	Dream On, GOOD Music, Universal Motown	
September 15	Kittie	In the Black	Groove metal	eOne	
September 15	KRS-One and Buckshot	Survival Skills	Hip-hop	Duck Down	
September 15	Living Colour	The Chair in the Doorway	Funk metal, experimental rock, alternative metal	Megaforce	
September 15	Megadeth	Endgame	Thrash metal	Roadrunner	
September 15	M.O.P.	Foundation	East Coast hip-hop, hardcore hip-hop	Koch	
September 15	Moneen	The World I Want to Leave Behind	Indie rock	Dine Alone	
September 15	New Boyz	Skinny Jeanz and a Mic	Pop-rap, hyphy	Shotty Music, Asylum, Warner Bros.	
September 15	Pere Ubu with Sarah Jane Morris	Long Live Père Ubu!	Punk rock	Hearpen Records	
September 15	Pete Yorn & Scarlett Johansson	Break Up	Indie folk, alternative rock	Atco, Rhino	
September 15	Shadows Fall	Retribution	Thrash metal, metalcore	Everblack Industries	
September 15	Trick Daddy	Finally Famous: Born a Thug, Still a Thug	Southern hip-hop, gangsta rap	Dunk Ryder Records	
September 15	Uncle Kracker	Happy Hour	Alternative rock, country	Top Dog Records, Atlantic	
September 16	I Am Kloot	B	Indie rock	Skinny Dog	
September 20	Dizzee Rascal	Tongue n' Cheek	Dance, hip-hop	Dirtee Stank, Liberation Music	
September 20	Pearl Jam	Backspacer	Alternative rock, hard rock	Monkeywrench	
September 21	Alberta Cross	Broken Side of Time	Indie rock, alternative country, blues rock	Ark, ATO	
September 21	Basement Jaxx	Scars		XL, Ultra Music, Interscope	
September 21	Evile	Infected Nations	Thrash metal	Earache	
September 21	Marduk	Wormwood	Black metal	Regain	
September 21	Mika	The Boy Who Knew Too Much	Pop	Casablanca, Universal Republic	
September 21	Plastic Ono Band	Between My Head and the Sky	Art rock, experimental rock, avant-pop	Chimera Music	
September 21	Richard Hawley	Truelove's Gutter	Alternative pop, chamber pop	Mute	
September 21	Stellar Kart	Everything Is Different Now	Pop-punk	INO	
September 22	Brand New	Daisy	Post-hardcore, noise rock, art rock	Interscope, DGC	
September 22	Brother Ali	Us	Hip-hop	Rhymesayers Entertainment	
September 22	David Crowder Band	Church Music	Christian rock, worship	sixsteps	
September 22	Despised Icon	Day of Mourning	Deathcore	Century Media	
September 22	Five Finger Death Punch	War Is the Answer	Groove metal, hard rock	Prospect Park, Spinefarm	
September 22	Fred Anderson	21st Century Chase	Jazz	Delmark	
September 22	Girls	Album	Indie pop, indie rock	True Panther Sounds	
September 22	Hawk Nelson	Live Life Loud	Christian rock, alternative rock, pop-punk	BEC	
September 22	The Hidden Cameras	Origin:Orphan	Indie rock	Arts & Crafts	
September 22	Islands	Vapours	Indie rock	Anti-	
September 22	Lights	The Listening	Synth-pop, indietronica, alternative rock	Sire, Universal Music Canada	
September 22	Monsters of Folk	Monsters of Folk	Alternative rock, indie folk	Shangri-La Music, Rough Trade	
September 22	Nitty Gritty Dirt Band	Speed of Life	Country, country rock, folk rock	NGDB Records	
September 22	Pillar	Confessions	Post-grunge, heavy metal, hard rock	Essential	
September 22	Rufus Wainwright	Milwaukee at Last!!!		Decca	
September 22	Sean Kingston	Tomorrow	Hip-hop, reggae fusion, R&B	Beluga Heights, Epic	
September 22	Three Days Grace	Life Starts Now	Post-grunge, alternative metal, hard rock	Jive	
September 22	The Twilight Sad	Forget the Night Ahead	Indie rock, shoegaze	Fat Cat	
September 22	Volcano Choir	Unmap	Ambient, experimental	Jagjaguwar	
September 22	Why?	Eskimo Snow	Indie rock	Anticon	
September 25	Paradise Lost	Faith Divides Us – Death Unites Us	Gothic metal, doom metal	Century Media	
September 25	Vitalic	Flashmob	Electro house, electroclash	Different, PIAS	
September 28	Anti-Pop Consortium	Fluorescent Black	Hip-hop	Big Dada	
September 28	Arch Enemy	The Root of All Evil	Melodic death metal	Century Media	
September 28	Basshunter	Bass Generation	Eurodance		
September 28	Hope Sandoval & the Warm Inventions	Through the Devil Softly	Alternative rock, psychedelic rock, folk rock	Nettwerk	
September 28	Ian Brown	My Way	Alternative rock	Fiction Records	
September 28	Kris Kristofferson	Closer to the Bone	Country	New West	
September 28	Mariah Carey	Memoirs of an Imperfect Angel	Hip-hop, R&B	Island	
September 28	Newton Faulkner	Rebuilt by Humans	Folk rock, pop rock, art rock	Ugly Truth Records	
September 28	Paloma Faith	Do You Want the Truth or Something Beautiful?	Pop, soul, jazz	Epic	
September 28	Various artists	More than a Game	Hip-hop, R&B	Zone 4, Interscope	
September 29	AFI	Crash Love	Pop rock	Interscope	
September 29	Alice in Chains	Black Gives Way to Blue	Heavy metal, sludge metal, doom metal	Virgin	
September 29	The Avett Brothers	I and Love and You	Folk rock, Americana, roots rock	American	
September 29	Barbra Streisand	Love Is the Answer	Jazz	Columbia	
September 29	Breaking Benjamin	Dear Agony	Alternative metal, post-grunge	Hollywood	
September 29	Cherry Poppin' Daddies	Skaboy JFK	Ska	Space Age Bachelor Pad Records, Rock Ridge Music	
September 29	Default	Comes and Goes	Alternative rock, hard rock, post-grunge	EMI Canada	
September 29	Dethklok	Dethalbum II	Melodic death metal	Williams Street	
September 29	Doomriders	Darkness Come Alive	Sludge metal	Deathwish	
September 29	Drummer	Feel Good Together	Indie rock	Audio Eagle Records	
September 29	Evergreen Terrace	Almost Home	Melodic hardcore, metalcore	Metal Blade	
September 29	The Ettes	Do You Want Power		Take Root Records	
September 29	Foreigner	Can't Slow Down	Rock	Rhino	
September 29	illScarlett	1UP!	Ska punk, reggae rock, alternative rock	Sony Music Canada	
September 29	Kill Hannah	Wake Up the Sleepers	Post-punk revival, dance-punk, alternative rock	Original Signal, Universal Motown	
September 29	Lynyrd Skynyrd	God & Guns	Southern rock, blues rock, heavy metal	Roadrunner	
September 29	Mack 10	Soft White	West Coast hip-hop, gangsta rap	Hoo-Bangin', Fontana	
September 29	Miranda Lambert	Revolution	Country	Columbia Nashville	
September 29	Om	God Is Good	Psychedelic rock, stoner metal, doom metal	Drag City	
September 29	Paramore	Brand New Eyes	Alternative rock, pop-punk, emo pop	Fueled by Ramen	
September 29	Revocation	Existence Is Futile	Technical death metal, thrash metal	Relapse	
September 29	Selena Gomez & the Scene	Kiss & Tell	Electronic rock, pop rock	Hollywood	
September 29	Strung Out	Agents of the Underground	Skate punk, punk metal, metalcore	Fat Wreck Chords	
September 29	Warren G	The G Files	West Coast hip-hop	Koch Records	
September 29	You Say Party	XXXX	Indie rock, dance-punk	Paper Bag	
September 30	Air	Love 2	Electronica, space rock	Virgin	
September 30	Backstreet Boys	This Is Us	Pop, electropop	Jive	

== Fourth quarter ==
=== October ===
List of albums released in October 2009
Go to: January | February | March | April | May | June | July | August | September | October | November | December | Back to top
Release date	Artist	Album	Genre	Label	Ref.
October 1	Boys Noize	Power	Electronic	Boysnoize Records	
October 2	Mumford & Sons	Sigh No More		Island, Glassnote	
October 2	Natalie Imbruglia	Come to Life	Pop	Island	
October 2	Scar Symmetry	Dark Matter Dimensions	Melodic death metal	Nuclear Blast	
October 2	Tokio Hotel	Humanoid		Cherrytree Records, Island	
October 2	Scooter	Under the Radar Over the Top	Jumpstyle, hardstyle, hard trance	Sheffield Tunes	
October 5	Ancestors	Of Sound Mind	Psychedelic rock	Tee Pee	
October 6	Apathy	Wanna Snuggle?	Hip-hop	Demigodz Records	
October 6	Betty Davis	Is It Love or Desire?		Light in the Attic	
October 6	Blessthefall	Witness	Metalcore, post-hardcore, screamo	Fearless	
October 6	Brandi Carlile	Give Up the Ghost	Folk rock	Columbia	
October 6	Built to Spill	There Is No Enemy	Indie rock	Warner Bros., ATP	
October 6	Chris Tomlin	Glory in the Highest: Christmas Songs of Worship	Christmas, CCM	sixstepsrecords	
October 6	The Clientele	Bonfires on the Heath	Indie pop	Merge, Pointy	
October 6	Dead Man's Bones	Dead Man's Bones		Anti-	
October 6	downhere	How Many Kings: Songs for Christmas	Christian rock, Christmas	Centricity Music	
October 6	Everclear	In a Different Light	Alternative rock, post-grunge	429	
October 6	The Fall of Troy	In the Unlikely Event	Mathcore, progressive rock, post-hardcore	Equal Vision	
October 6	Family Force 5	Family Force 5's Christmas Pageant	Christmas, Christian rock, crunkcore	Transparent Media Group, Tooth & Nail	
October 6	Fat Joe	Jealous Ones Still Envy 2	Hip-hop	Terror Squad, Capitol	
October 6	Fee	Hope Rising	CCM, Christian rock	INO	
October 6	Horse the Band	Desperate Living	Metalcore, Nintendocore, experimental rock	Vagrant	
October 6	Joe Perry	Have Guitar, Will Travel	Hard rock	Roman Records	
October 6	Kiss	Sonic Boom	Hard rock, heavy metal	Roadrunner	
October 6	Kurt Vile	Childish Prodigy	Indie rock, lo-fi	Matador	
October 6	Lou Barlow	Goodnight Unknown	Folk rock, lo-fi, alternative rock	Merge, Domino	
October 6	Luke Bryan	Doin' My Thing	Country	Capitol Nashville	
October 6	Matthew Good	Vancouver	Rock	Universal Music Canada	
October 6	Mayday Parade	Anywhere but Here	Pop-punk, emo, pop rock	Fearless, Atlantic	
October 6	Mission of Burma	The Sound the Speed the Light	Post-punk, indie rock	Matador	
October 6	The Mountain Goats	The Life of the World to Come	Folk rock, indie rock	4AD	
October 6	A Place to Bury Strangers	Exploding Head	Noise rock, shoegaze, post-punk revival	Mute	
October 6	Port O'Brien	Threadbare		TBD	
October 6	Powerman 5000	Somewhere on the Other Side of Nowhere	Industrial metal	Mighty Loud Records	
October 6	The Raveonettes	In and Out of Control	Indie rock, shoegaze, noise pop	Fierce Panda, Vice	
October 6	Relient K	Forget and Not Slow Down	Alternative rock, rock	Mono vs Stereo, Jive	
October 6	Tiësto	Kaleidoscope	Progressive trance, electro house	Musical Freedom Records	
October 6	Toby Keith	American Ride	Country	Show Dog Nashville	
October 6	Todd Agnew	Need	Christian rock	Ardent, INO	
October 6	We Shot the Moon	A Silver Lining	Alternative rock	Afternoon	
October 8	James Yorkston	Folk Songs	Folk	Domino	
October 9	Michael Bublé	Crazy Love	Vocal jazz, traditional pop	Reprise	
October 9	Shakira	She Wolf	Electropop, new wave	Epic	
October 9	Wadada Leo Smith	Spiritual Dimensions	Jazz	Cuneiform	
October 12	Bad Lieutenant	Never Cry Another Tear	Alternative rock	Triple Echo Records	
October 12	Bowling for Soup	Sorry for Partyin'	Pop-punk	Jive	
October 12	Cate Le Bon	Me Oh My	Indie rock, folk rock, psychedelic rock	Irony Bored	
October 12	Echo & the Bunnymen	The Fountain	Alternative rock	Ocean Rain	
October 12	Editors	In This Light and on This Evening	Post-punk revival, dark wave, synth-pop	Kitchenware	
October 12	Horace Andy and Alpha	Two Phazed People		Don't Touch Records	
October 12	Mario	D.N.A	R&B	J	
October 12	A Rocket to the Moon	On Your Side	Emo pop, pop rock	Fueled by Ramen	
October 12	Tord Gustavsen Ensemble	Restored, Returned	Jazz	ECM	
October 13	Baroness	Blue Record	Sludge metal, progressive metal	Relapse	
October 13	Bob Dylan	Christmas in the Heart	Christmas music	Columbia	
October 13	David Archuleta	Christmas from the Heart	Christmas, pop	Jive	
October 13	Dead by Sunrise	Out of Ashes	Alternative rock, hard rock, alternative metal	Warner Bros.	
October 13	Five for Fighting	Slice	Soft rock	Aware, Wind-up	
October 13	The Flaming Lips	Embryonic	Acid rock, psychedelic rock	Warner Bros.	
October 13	Grant-Lee Phillips	Little Moon		Yep Roc	
October 13	Kottonmouth Kings	Hidden Stash 420		Suburban Noize	
October 13	Lightning Bolt	Earthly Delights	Noise rock	Load	
October 13	Nellie McKay	Normal as Blueberry Pie – A Tribute to Doris Day	Pop	Verve	
October 13	Sherwood	QU	Rock	MySpace	
October 13	Sole and the Skyrider Band	Plastique	Hip-hop	Fake Four Inc.	
October 13	Sugarland	Gold and Green	Christmas, country	Mercury Nashville	
October 15	Barry Guy London Jazz Composers Orchestra with Irène Schweizer	Radio Rondo/Schaffhausen Concert	Free jazz	Intakt	
October 16	Rammstein	Liebe ist für alle da	Neue Deutsche Härte, industrial metal	Universal	
October 16	Rowland S. Howard	Pop Crimes		Liberation, Fat Possum	
October 18	Beak	Beak	Experimental rock, gothic rock, krautrock	Invada	
October 19	Annie	Don't Stop	Electropop, synth-pop, indie electronic	Totally, Smalltown Supersound	
October 19	Atlas Sound	Logos	Bedroom pop	Kranky	
October 20	Bomshel	Fight Like a Girl	Country	Curb	
October 20	Converge	Axe to Fall	Metalcore, hardcore punk, post-hardcore	Epitaph	
October 20	Electric Six	Kill	Rock	Metropolis	
October 20	Espers	III	Folk rock, psychedelic rock	Drag City	
October 20	Fashawn	Boy Meets World	Hip-hop	One, EMI	
October 20	Flight of the Conchords	I Told You I Was Freaky		Sub Pop	
October 20	Jay Farrar & Benjamin Gibbard	One Fast Move or I'm Gone		Atlanic	
October 20	Joss Stone	Colour Me Free!	Soul	Virgin	
October 20	Kings of Convenience	Declaration of Dependence	Indie pop, indie folk	Virgin	
October 20	Kutless	It Is Well	Christian rock, soft rock, worship	BEC	
October 20	Priestess	Prior to the Fire	Hard rock	Indica Records, Tee Pee	
October 20	Royce da 5'9"	Street Hop	Hip-hop	M.I.C. Records	
October 20	Sufjan Stevens	The BQE	Avant-garde, electronic, classical	Asthmatic Kitty	
October 20	Themselves	Crowns Down	Alternative hip-hop	Anticon	
October 21	Gorgoroth	Quantos Possunt ad Satanitatem Trahunt	Black metal	Regain	
October 23	Cheryl Cole	3 Words	Dance-pop, R&B	Fascination, Polydor	
October 23	Hypocrisy	A Taste of Extreme Divinity	Melodic death metal	Nuclear Blast	
October 23	The Swell Season	Strict Joy	Indie folk	Plateau, Anti-	
October 23	Transatlantic	The Whirland	Progressive rock	Metal Blade, Radiant	
October 23	Wolfmother	Cosmic Egg	Hard rock, psychedelic rock	Modular	
October 26	Alphabeat	The Spell	Dance-pop, Europop	Copenhagen	
October 26	Hudson Mohawke	Butter	Wonky, electronic, hip-hop	Warp	
October 26	Tegan and Sara	Sainthood		Sire	
October 27	3	Revisions	Progressive rock	Metal Blade	
October 27	Atreyu	Congregation of the Damned	Metalcore, post-hardcore	Hollywood, Roadrunner	
October 27	Between the Buried and Me	The Great Misdirect	Progressive metal, technical death metal, avant-garde metal	Victory	
October 27	CFCF	Continent	EDM, electropop	Paper Bag	
October 27	Creed	Full Circle	Post-grunge, alternative metal, hard rock	Wind-up	
October 27	Devendra Banhart	What Will We Be	Folk, freak folk	Reprise, Warner Bros.	
October 27	Hem	Twelfth Night		Waveland Records	
October 27	Joe Nichols	Old Things New	Country	Universal South	
October 27	Kam Moye	Splitting Image	Hip-hop	MYX Music	
October 27	Morningwood	Diamonds & Studs	Alternative rock, dance-rock, power pop	VH1 Records	
October 27	Pelican	What We All Come to Need	Post-metal	Southern Lord	
October 27	The Red Chord	Fed Through the Teeth Machine	Deathgrind	Metal Blade	
October 27	R.E.M.	Live at the Olympia	Alternative rock	Warner Bros.	
October 27	Squirrel Nut Zippers	Lost at Sea		Hillbilly Productions	
October 27	Swollen Members	Armed to the Teeth	Hip-hop	Suburban Noize	
October 27	Tech N9ne	K.O.D.	Hardcore hip-hop, horrorcore, crunk	Strange Music	
October 27	Train	Save Me, San Francisco	Rock, roots rock, pop rock	Columbia	
October 28	Trans-Siberian Orchestra	Night Castle	Symphonic metal, progressive metal, neoclassical metal	Lava	
October 30	John K. Samson	City Route 85	Acoustic	Anti-, Epitaph	
October 30	Weezer	Raditude	Power pop, pop rock	DGC, Interscope, Geffen	
October 31	Lil Wayne	No Ceilings	Hip-hop	Young Money, Cash Money	

=== November ===
List of albums released in November 2009
Go to: January | February | March | April | May | June | July | August | September | October | November | December | Back to top
Release date	Artist	Album	Genre	Label	Ref.
November 2	Brett Anderson	Slow Attack	Indie rock	BA Songs	
November 2	Delirious?	History Makers	Rock, Christian rock		
November 2	Julian Casablancas	Phrazes for the Young	Alternative rock, synth-pop, new wave	RCA	
November 2	Katatonia	Night Is the New Day	Alternative metal, doom metal	Peaceville	
November 2	Various artists	The Inbetweeners Soundtrack	Alternative rock, punk rock, R&B	EMI	
November 3	The Almost	Monster Monster	Alternative rock, emo	Tooth & Nail	
November 3	Amerie	In Love & War	R&B, soul, hip-hop	Feenix Rising, Def Jam	
November 3	Andrea Bocelli	My Christmas	Christmas	Universal, Decca, Verve	
November 3	Carrie Underwood	Play On	Country	Arista Nashville	
November 3	Cold Cave	Love Comes Close	Synth-pop, dark wave	Heartworm Press, Matador	
November 3	Every Avenue	Picture Perfect	Pop-punk, alternative rock, power pop	Fearless	
November 3	Nile	Those Whom the Gods Detest	Technical death metal	Nuclear Blast	
November 3	Ryan Leslie	Transition	R&B, hip-hop	Casablanca, Universal	
November 3	Say Anything	Say Anything	Pop-punk, emo, post-hardcore	RCA	
November 3	Shane & Shane	Everything Is Different	Contemporary worship	Inpop	
November 3	Shwayze	Let It Beat	Alternative hip-hop	Suretone	
November 3	Slayer	World Painted Blood	Thrash metal	American, Sony Music	
November 3	Steven Curtis Chapman	Beauty Will Rise	CCM	Sparrow	
November 3	We Came as Romans	To Plant a Seed	Metalcore	Equal Vision	
November 4	Swallow the Sun	New Moon	Death-doom, melodic death metal, gothic metal	Spinefarm, Svart	
November 6	Mars Argo	Technology Is a Dead Bird		Grocerybag Media	
November 7	Wale	Attention Deficit	Alternative hip-hop	Allido, Interscope	
November 9	50 Cent	Before I Self Destruct	Gangsta rap, hardcore hip-hop	Shady, G-Unit, Aftermath	
November 9	Biffy Clyro	Only Revolutions	Alternative rock	14th Floor	
November 9	Howard Jones	Ordinary Heroes	Pop	DTox	
November 9	Leona Lewis	Echo	R&B, pop	Syco	
November 9	Robbie Williams	Reality Killed the Video Star	Pop	Virgin	
November 9	Shirley Bassey	The Performance	Pop	Geffen	
November 10	Big Kenny	The Quiet Times of a Rock and Roll Farm Boy	Country, rock, pop	Glotown Records, Love Everybody, Bigger Picture	
November 10	Bon Jovi	The Circle	Hard rock, pop rock	Island	
November 10	Crooked I	Mr. Pigface Weapon Waist			
November 10	Dashboard Confessional	Alter the Ending	Emo, alternative rock	Interscope	
November 10	Ella Fitzgerald	Twelve Nights in Hollywood	Vocal jazz	Verve	
November 10	Flyleaf	Memento Mori	Post-grunge, alternative metal	A&M Octone	
November 10	Gaza	He Is Never Coming Back	Sludge metal, metalcore, hardcore punk	Black Market Activities	
November 10	Jamie Cullum	The Pursuit	Crossover jazz, pop	Decca	
November 10	Krallice	Dimensional Bleedthrough	Black metal	Profound Lore, Gilead Media	
November 10	Puscifer	"C" Is for (Please Insert Sophomoric Genitalia Reference Here)	Trip hop, post-industrial	Puscifer Entertainment	
November 10	Switchfoot	Hello Hurricane	Alternative rock, art rock, post-rock	Atlantic	
November 10	Tori Amos	Midwinter Graces	Christmas, traditional	Universal Republic	
November 10	Throwdown	Deathless	Groove metal	eOne	
November 10	A Wilhelm Scream	A Wilhelm Scream	Melodic hardcore, punk rock	Paper + Plastick	
November 10	Wyclef Jean	From the Hut, to the Projects, to the Mansion		Carnival House Records	
November 11	Norah Jones	The Fall	Rock	Blue Note	
November 13	Katy Perry	MTV Unplugged	Acoustic, lounge	Capitol	
November 13	N-Dubz	Against All Odds	Hip-hop, pop rap, R&B	All Around the World	
November 13	OneRepublic	Waking Up	Pop rock	Mosley Music, Interscope	
November 13	Powderfinger	Golden Rule	Rock, alternative rock	Universal Music	
November 13	Them Crooked Vultures	Them Crooked Vultures	Hard rock, alternative rock	Interscope, DGC, RCA	
November 16	Felt	Felt 3: A Tribute to Rosie Perez	Hip-hop	Rhymesayers	
November 16	Shakespears Sister	Songs from the Red Room	Pop rock, synth-pop, new wave	SF Records	
November 16	Stereophonics	Keep Calm and Carry On	Rock, alternative rock, pop rock	V2, Mercury	
November 17	Casting Crowns	Until the Whole World Hears	Christian rock, CCM	Beach Street	
November 17	The Devin Townsend Project	Addicted	Progressive metal, alternative metal, hard rock	HevyDevy, Inside Out Music	
November 17	The Empire Shall Fall	Awaken	Metalcore	Angle Side Side Records	
November 17	Hedley	The Show Must Go	Alternative rock, pop rock	Universal Music Canada, Island	
November 17	John Mayer	Battle Studies	Pop rock	Columbia	
November 17	Justin Bieber	My World	Teen pop, dance-pop	Island, Teen Island, RBMG	
November 17	Kid Sister	Ultraviolet	Hip-hop, electro, R&B	Fool's Gold, Downtown, Universal Republic	
November 17	Kris Allen	Kris Allen	Pop rock, alternative rock	Jive, 19	
November 17	Phil Wickham	Heaven & Earth	CCM, worship	INO	
November 17	Rakim	The Seventh Seal	Hip-hop	SMC, Universal, Fontana	
November 18	B'z	Magic	Hard rock, pop rock	Vermillion	
November 18	Dark Funeral	Angelus Exuro pro Eternus	Black metal	Regain	
November 18	Lady Gaga	The Fame Monster	Electropop	Interscope	
November 20	Rihanna	Rated R	Pop, hip-hop, R&B	Def Jam, SRP Records	
November 23	Adam Lambert	For Your Entertainment	Pop, dance-pop, pop rock	RCA, 19	
November 23	Animal Collective	Fall Be Kind		Domino	
November 23	Birdman	Priceless	Hip-hop	Cash Money, Universal Motown	
November 23	Edan	Echo Party	Hip-hop	Five Day Weekend	
November 23	Jay Sean	All or Nothing	R&B	Jayded Records, 2Point9, Cash Money	
November 23	Susan Boyle	I Dreamed a Dream	Operatic pop, crossover, easy listening	Syco Music, Columbia	
November 23	Tom Petty and the Heartbreakers	The Live Anthology	Heartland rock, rock	Reprise	
November 23	Tom Waits	Glitter and Doom Live	Experimental rock	Anti-	
November 24	Seabird	The Silent Night EP	Alternative rock, indie		
November 24	Wiz Khalifa	Deal or No Deal	Hip-hop	Rostrum, iHipHop, Fontana	
November 27	Westlife	Where We Are	Pop, pop rock	S, RCA, Sony Music	
November 29	Pope Benedict XVI	Alma Mater	Christmas	Geffen	
November 30	R. Kelly	Untitled	R&B	Jive	

=== December ===
List of albums released in December 2009
Go to: January | February | March | April | May | June | July | August | September | October | November | December | Back to top
Release date	Artist	Album	Genre	Label	Ref.
December 1	Allison Iraheta	Just like You	Pop rock, teen pop	19, Jive	
December 1	The Bravery	Stir the Blood	Post-punk revival	Island	
December 1	Juvenile	Cocky & Confident	Hip-hop	Atlantic, UTP Records, eOne	
December 1	MxPx	Punk Rawk Christmas	Christian punk, skate punk, Christmas	Rock City Recording Company	
December 1	Priscilla Renea	Jukebox	Pop, rock, R&B	Capitol	
December 1	Souls of Mischief	Montezuma's Revenge	Alternative hip-hop	Clear Label Records	
December 1	Thalía	Primera Fila	Latin pop	Sony Music Latin	
December 7	Buraka Som Sistema	FabricLive.49	Kuduro, grime	Fabric Records	
December 8	B.G.	Too Hood 2 Be Hollywood	Gangsta rap, Southern hip-hop	Chopper City	
December 8	By Divine Right	Mutant Message	Indie rock	Hand Drawn Dracula	
December 8	Chris Brown	Graffiti	R&B, Eurodisco, synth-pop	Jive	
December 8	Gucci Mane	The State vs. Radric Davis	Hip-hop, dirty south	1017 Brick Squad, Asylum, Warner Bros.	
December 8	The Mighty Mighty Bosstones	Pin Points and Gin Joints	Ska punk	Big Rig	
December 8	Puddle of Mudd	Volume 4: Songs in the Key of Love & Hate	Post-grunge	Flawless, Geffen	
December 8	Snoop Dogg	Malice n Wonderland	Hip-hop	Doggystyle, Priority	
December 8	Thirty Seconds to Mars	This Is War	Alternative rock, progressive rock, experimental rock	Virgin	
December 8	Timbaland	Shock Value II	Hip-hop, R&B, pop	Blackground, Mosley Music	
December 8	We the Kings	Smile Kid	Pop-punk, pop rock, power pop	S-Curve	
December 11	Alicia Keys	The Element of Freedom	R&B	J	
December 14	Kylie Minogue	Kylie Live in New York	Pop, dance, electronica	Parlophone	
December 15	Obie Trice	Special Reserve	Hip-hop	MoSS Appeal Music	
December 15	Robin Thicke	Sex Therapy: The Session	R&B, soul, hip-hop	Star Trak, Interscope	
December 15	Seabird	Rocks into Rivers	CCM	Credential	
December 15	t.A.T.u.	Waste Management	Electronic, dance-pop	T.A. Music, Misterya Zvuka	
December 18	Mary J. Blige	Stronger with Each Tear		Matriarch Records, Geffen	
December 21	Cold War Kids	Behave Yourself	Indie rock, soul	Downtown, V2	
December 21	Eminem	Relapse: Refill	Hip-hop	Aftermath, Shady, Interscope	
December 21	Hurricane Chris	Unleashed	Hip-hop	Polo Grounds Music, J	
December 21	Mudvayne	Mudvayne	Nu metal, alternative metal	Epic	
December 21	Various artists	We Are Young Money	Hip-hop, R&B	Young Money	
December 22	John Reuben	Sex, Drugs and Self-Control	Christian hip-hop	Gotee	
December 25	Tyler, the Creator	Bastard	Alternative hip-hop	Tyler, the Creator	
December 28	Codeine Velvet Club	Codeine Velvet Club	Baroque pop	Island	
December 29	Twenty One Pilots	Twenty One Pilots	Emo	Twenty One Pilots	
