= The Silent Night EP =

EP by Seabird
- Released: November 24, 2009
- Genre: Alternative rock, indie
- Length: 11:40
- Label: Credential

Seabird chronology
'Til We See the Shore (2008)	The Silent Night EP (2009)	Rocks Into Rivers (2009)

Professional ratings
Review scores
Source	Rating
Jesus Freak Hideout	3.5/5 stars

The Silent Night EP is a Christmas EP album by Seabird. The EP was released on November 24, 2009. Their version of "Joy to the World" was featured on Grey's Anatomy.

== Track listing ==
1. "Silent Night" (3:59)
2. "Joy to the World" (4:19)
3. "Don't You Know You're Beautiful" (3:32) (bonus track)
