= Troubled Days =

Studio album by Seabird
- Released: July 16, 2013
- Recorded: 2013
- Genre: Alternative rock Indie rock
- Length: 44:10
- Label: Bird Brothers, Independent
- Producer: Paul Moak

Seabird chronology
Over the Hills And Everywhere EP (2010)	Troubled Days (2013)	*

Professional ratings
Review scores
Source	Rating
JesusFreakHideout	4/5 stars
PopMatters	6/10

Trouble Days was recorded independently by Christian alternative rock band Seabird. The album was released on July 16, 2013 and funded largely by $40,000 generated on Kickstarter.

== Track listing ==
All tracks are written by Seabird.

No.	Title	Length
1.	"Love Will Be Enough"	3:43
2.	"Pull You In"	4:39
3.	"Please Please"	4:04
4.	"Stand Out"	3:07
5.	"We Can't Be Friends"	3:45
6.	"Something Better Change"	3:29
7.	"Love Suicide"	3:44
8.	"Find a Way"	3:16
9.	"Troubled Days"	2:46
10.	"Golden Skies"	4:12
11.	"Extraordinary"	3:11
12.	"Palmetto Peach"	4:14

== Personnel ==
- Aaron Morgan – vocals, keys, Tubular Bells, Background Vocals
- Ryan Morgan – guitars
- Chris Kubik – bass
- Aaron Hunt – drums, Percussion, Background Vocals
- Paul Moak -Guitars, B3 organ, Background Vocals
- Meridith Oesting -Hammered Dulcimer, Background Vocals
- Group Vocals -Natalie Morgan, Celeste Morgan, Christina VonHagel, Paul Moak, Devin (Grape Lady) Vaughan

- Engineer: Paul Moak at the Smoakstack
- Assistant Engineers: Justin March and Devin Vaughan
- Production Coordination: Lani Crump and Dave Steunebrink for Showdown Productions
- Mix: Sean Moffitt at Pinstrip Studios
- Mis Assistant: Warren David
- Mastering: Dave McNair at Dave McNair Mastering
- Design: Matthew Dugger
- Photographer: John Willis
