= Arrows (Polly Scattergood album) =

Studio album by Polly Scattergood
- Released: 22 October 2013
- Recorded: 2009
- Genre: Indie pop
- Length: 44:15
- Label: Mute

Polly Scattergood chronology
Polly Scattergood (2009)	Arrows (2013)	In This Moment (2020)

Singles from Arrows

Professional ratings
Review scores
Source	Rating
AllMusic	3.5/5 stars

Arrows is the second album by the English singer-songwriter Polly Scattergood, released in the United Kingdom on 22 October 2013 by Mute Records.

== Track listing ==
All songs written by Glenn Kerrigan, Polly Scattergood unless noted.

1. "Cocoon" (Polly Scattergood)
2. "Falling"
3. "Machines"
4. "Disco Damaged Kid"
5. "Colours Colliding"
6. "Miss You"
7. "Subsequently Lost"
8. "Silver Lining"
9. "Wanderlust"
10. "I've Got a Heart (Polly Scattergood)"
