= Too Fake =

2009 single by Hockey

Single by Hockey

from the album Mind Chaos
- Released: March 16, 2009
- Genre: Indie pop
- Length: 3:44 (radio edit); 4:07 (album version)
- Label: Capitol
- Songwriter(s): Benjamin Grubin

Hockey singles chronology
"Too Fake" (2009)	"Learn to Lose" (2009)

"Too Fake" is a single by American band Hockey, released in 2009 by Capitol Records. The same year, a remix of the song was used as the background for a JCPenney commercial. In 2010 the song was sampled by American rapper Big Sean on the track "Too Fake", which was produced by Xaphoon Jones and features American alternative hip hop band Chiddy Bang. Later, the single was featured in the games Saints Row: The Third and NHL 2K10.
