= Live at the BBC (Robert Cray album) =

Live album by Robert Cray
- Released: 13 May 2008
- Venue: Hammersmith Odeon, London
- Genre: Blues
- Length: 70:44
- Label: Vanguard
- Producer: Robert Cray

Robert Cray chronology
Live from Across the Pond (2006)	Live at the BBC (2008)	This Time (2009)

Professional ratings
Review scores
Source	Rating
AllMusic	3.5/5 stars

Live at the BBC is a live blues album by Robert Cray. It was released in 2008, through Vanguard Records. It is the second live album to be released by Cray to date, it was recorded in 1988, and 1991 at the Hammersmith Odeon.

== Track listing ==
1. "I Guess I Showed Her" – 3:59
2. "Foul Play" – 4:34
3. "Don't Be Afraid of the Dark" – 4:23
4. "Don't You Even Care" – 4:53
5. "Night Patrol" – 5:28
6. "Nothin' But a Woman" – 4:39
7. "Phone Booth" – 4:09
8. "These Things" – 6:15
9. "My Problem" – 5:23
10. "The Forecast (Calls for Pain)" – 4:53
11. "Consequences" – 4:26
12. "Right Next Door (Because of Me)" – 5:44
13. "Acting This Way" – 5:03
14. "Smoking Gun" – 6:55
