= Cookin' in Mobile =

Live album by Robert Cray
- Released: July 27, 2010
- Recorded: Saenger Theatre, Mobile, Alabama
- Genre: Blues
- Label: Vanguard
- Producer: Rob Dennis

Robert Cray chronology
| This Time (2009) | Cookin' in Mobile (2010) | Nothin but Love (2012) |

Professional ratings
Review scores
| Source | Rating |
|---|---|
| AllMusic | 4/5 stars |

Cookin' in Mobile is a live CD/DVD released by Robert Cray. It was released on July 27, 2010, through Vanguard Records. It is his first live concert released on DVD to date and his third live album. The concert was recorded February 21, 2010, at the historic Saenger Theatre in Mobile, Alabama while on tour supporting his latest album This Time.

== Track listing ==
1. "Our Last Time"
2. "Anytime"
3. "Love 2009"
4. "Right Next Door (Because Of Me)"
5. "Chicken in the Kitchen"
6. "Sitting on Top of the World"
7. "One in the Middle"
8. "Lotta Lovin'"
9. "Smoking Gun"
10. "I Can't Fail"
11. "That's What Keeps Me Rockin'"
12. "Time Makes Two"

== DVD extra features ==
1. Behind The Scenes Interviews
2. Phone Booth Performance
3. Twenty Music Video
4. Photo Gallery From the Show

== Robert Cray Band ==
- Robert Cray - Guitar, Vocals
- Jim Pugh - Keyboards
- Richard Cousins - Bass
- Tony Braunagel - Drums
