= Remixes (The Phenomenal Handclap Band album) =

Remix album by the Phenomenal Handclap Band
- Released: 2010
- Genres: Indie rock, alternative rock, indie electronic, alt-disco, DJ
- Length: 63:16
- Label: Tummy Touch Records
- Producers: Daniel Collas & Sean Marquand

Remixes is a remix album from the Phenomenal Handclap Band. It is a compilation of songs remixed from their first full-length album The Phenomenal Handclap Band.

== Track listing ==
1. Tears (Stallions Remix);– 8:19
2. 15 to 20 (80Kidz Remix);– 4:50
3. Baby (Clock Opera Remix);– 4:58
4. All of the Above (T.H. White Remix);– 6:07
5. You'll Disappear (Munk Remix);– 6:40
6. Dim the Lights (Coco Electrik Remix);– 4:24
7. Give It a Rest (Snack & C'mish Remix);– 4:36
8. 15 to 20 (Den Haan Remix);– 4:35
9. Testimony (Cosmodelica Remix);– 6:29
10. Baby (Virgil Howe Remix);– 5:04
11. The Martyr (Live KEXP Session);– 3:12
12. The Journey to Serra Da Estrela (Fujiya & Miyagi Remix);– 4:10
