= Hockey (band) =

American indie rock band

- Origin: Portland, Oregon, United States
- Genres: Dance-punk, indie rock, post-punk revival
- Years active: 2002–2018
- Labels: Capitol Records, Virgin Records
- Members: Benjamin Wyeth; Jeremy Reynolds; Ryan Dolliver (touring); Ian Luxton (touring)
- Past members: Brian White; Anthony Stassi

Hockey was an American indie rock band from Portland, Oregon.

== Members ==
Until October 2010, the band consisted of singer Benjamin Grubin, guitarist Brian Stuart White, bassist Jeremy Reynolds, drummer Anthony Stassi and touring keyboardist Ryan Dolliver, and have been compared in their sound to bands such as The Strokes and LCD Soundsystem. In October 2010, the band announced that Brian White and Anthony Stassi "have left the group to pursue other interests/horizons", as published on their Facebook page. In 2016, Ian Luxton joined the group as a touring member.

== History ==
After the band released a home-made EP called Mind Chaos in 2008, they signed to Capitol Records in the US and Virgin Records in the UK.

Hockey played on the John Peel Stage at Glastonbury 2009. In July 2009 they played on the Red Bull Bedrooms Jam Futures Stage at the T in the Park festival in Scotland. They have also made appearances at the 2009 Bonnaroo Festival, and the main stage of the 2009 Hove Festival in Norway on 23 June. The band's debut single "Too Fake" was released in the UK on March 16. The song was later sampled on a Big Sean track of the same name. The band released "Learn To Lose" on June 1 ahead of their debut album Mind Chaos, which was released in the US on September 14 and in the UK on September 28.

In late 2009, the band was chosen as one of Beyond Race Magazine's "50 Emerging Artists," resulting in a spot in the publication's #11 issue, as well as a Q&A for the magazine's site.

In January 2012, the band announced that they had started recording their upcoming album, and hoped to have it finished by the summer of that year.

In March 2018, singer Benjamin states "Hockey is dead" in a Facebook post on the original Hockey Facebook page. On this post also announcing his new band called 'Brand', which finished recording the first album.

== Discography ==
=== Studio albums ===
- Mind Chaos (released September 28, 2009)
- Wyeth Is (released May 7, 2013)
- Roller Coaster Sounds (released June 5, 2018)

=== Singles ===
- 4 Track EP (2006)
- "Too Fake" (March 16, 2009) #25 US Billboard Alternative Songs, #49 Rock Songs
- "Learn to Lose" (June 1, 2009)
- "Song Away" (September 14, 2009)
