= Polly Scattergood (album) =

Studio album by Polly Scattergood
- Released: 9 March 2009
- Recorded: 2009
- Genres: Indie pop; experimental
- Length: 48:38
- Label: Mute
- Producers: Simon Fisher Turner; Daniel Miller

Polly Scattergood chronology
| Polly Scattergood (2009) | Arrows (2013) |

Singles from Polly Scattergood
- 1. "Nitrogen Pink" Released: 26 November 2007; 2. "I Hate the Way" Released: 22 September 2008; 3. "Other Too Endless" Released: 23 February 2009; 4. "Please Don't Touch" Released: 4 May 2009; 5. "Bunny Club" Released: 16 November 2009

Professional ratings
Review scores
| Source | Rating |
|---|---|
| AllMusic | link |
| BBC Music | link |
| The Guardian | link |
| The Independent | link |
| IndieLondon | link |
| MusicOMH | link |
| Pitchfork Media | 5.3/10 link |
| The Times | link |
| Under the Radar | link |
| Yahoo! Music | link |

Polly Scattergood is the eponymous debut studio album by the English singer-songwriter Polly Scattergood, released in the United Kingdom on 9 March 2009 by Mute Records. The album did not feature on the UK Albums Chart.

== Track listing ==
All songs written by Polly Scattergood.

1. "I Hate the Way" – 7:07
2. "Other Too Endless" – 5:14
3. "Untitled 27" – 3:52
4. "Please Don't Touch" – 3:48
5. "I Am Strong" – 3:40
6. "Unforgiving Arms" – 3:56
7. "Poem Song" – 6:16
8. "Bunny Club" – 5:07
9. "Nitrogen Pink" – 5:04
10. "Breathe In Breathe Out" – 4:34

iTunes deluxe version bonus videos

1. "Polly Scattergood" (A Short Film) – 5:13
2. "Nitrogen Pink" (Treacle Session) – 4:33
3. "Untitled 27" (Treacle Session) – 3:54
4. "Please Don't Touch" (Treacle Session) – 3:55
