= 'Til We See the Shore =

Studio album by Seabird
- Released: June 24, 2008
- Recorded: 2004–2008
- Genre: Alternative rock Indie rock
- Length: 47:16
- Label: Credential
- Producer: Jacquire King and Allen Salmon

Seabird chronology
Let Me Go On (2007)	'Til We See the Shore (2008)	Rocks into Rivers (2009)

Singles from 'Til We See the Shore
- 1. "Rescue" Released: June 2008

'Til We See the Shore is the debut studio album by Christian alternative rock band Seabird. The album was released on June 24, 2008 and contains material from their first two EPs, Spread Your Broken Wings and Try and Let Me Go On. The album also spawned the band's first single, "Rescue".

== Track listing ==
All tracks are written by Aaron Morgan, except where noted.

No.	Title	Length
1.	"Black & Blue"	2:42
2.	"Apparitions"	4:18
3.	"Not Alone"	3:38
4.	"Rescue" (Morgan, Bear Rineheart)	3:45
5.	"Let Me Go On"	3:55
6.	"Stronger"	3:17
7.	"Cottonmouth (Jargon)"	4:58
8.	"Patience"	3:50
9.	"Sometimes" (Morgan, Steve Wilson)	3:41
10.	"Falling for You"	4:09
11.	"Maggie Mahoney"	3:53
12.	"'Til We See the Shore"	5:10

== Personnel ==
- Aaron Morgan – vocals, keyboards
- Ryan Morgan – guitar
- Chris Kubik – bass
- Aaron Hunt – drums
- Jesse Chambers, Nate Yetton, and Christopher York – A&R
- Jan Cook Creative – Director
- Mastering by Jim DeMain
- Mixing by Allen Salmon
- Art Director: Katie Moore
- Engineer: Allen Salmon and John Stinson
- Photographer: John Willis

== Charts ==
Chart (2009)	Peak position
Billboard Christian Albums	25
Billboard Top Heatseekers	14
