= Feel Good Together =

Studio album by Drummer
- Released: September 29, 2009
- Recorded: May–June 2009
- Studio: Tangerine Sound (Akron, OH)
- Genre: Indie rock
- Length: 38:59
- Label: Audio Eagle
- Producer: Ben Vehorn; Drummer

Feel Good Together is the only studio album by American indie rock band Drummer. It was released on September 29, 2009 via Audio Eagle Records.

== Critical reception ==
Professional ratings
Aggregate scores
Source	Rating
Metacritic	71/100
Review scores
Source	Rating
Pitchfork	7.5/10
Prefix	6.5/10
Rolling Stone	3/5 stars
Spectrum Culture	2.5/5
Under the Radar	8/10 stars

Feel Good Together was met with universal acclaim from music critics. At Metacritic, which assigns a normalized rating out of 100 to reviews from mainstream publications, the album received an average score of 71 based on four reviews.

David C. Obenour of Under the Radar praised the album, calling it "a bonafide indie rock, shoegaze venture, but with a real knack for melodies and, well... rhythm". Stephen Deusner of Pitchfork stated: "despite the band name, the album is a guitar-driven record, relying primarily on Stillman's dexterous fretwork to lead the quintet in and out of geometric jams that sound vaguely prog-metal in origin". Andrew Winistorfer of Prefix wrote: "together, which was recorded during a period of lengthy down time for all parties earlier this year, is the sound of five guys bro-ing down, drinking beers and recording an album. It's not the deepest thing ever recorded, but it is a fun little record that bears no pretense of seriousness".

In his mixed review for Rolling Stone, Will Hermes concluded: "the echoey vocals recall Nineties shoegazers like Ride, and the instrumental breaks suggest quality time has been spent with Pavement's Slanted and Enchanted".

== Track listing ==
No.	Title	Length
1.	"Lottery Dust"	3:21
2.	"Feel Good Together"	3:32
3.	"Serious Encounters"	4:43
4.	"Mature Fantasy"	4:19
5.	"Every Nineteen Minutes"	4:28
6.	"Good Golly"	3:29
7.	"Connect to Lounge"	4:31
8.	"Buddyscapes"	3:32
9.	"Diamonds to Shake"	3:33
10.	"Summer Control"	3:31
Total length:		38:59

== Personnel ==
- Jon Finley — vocals, guitar
- Steve Clements — background vocals, organ, Moog
- Jamie Stillman — guitar
- Patrick Carney — bass
- Greg Boyd — drums
- Ben Vehorn — producer, engineering, mixing
- Garrett Haines — mastering
