= Seabird (band) =

American alternative rock band

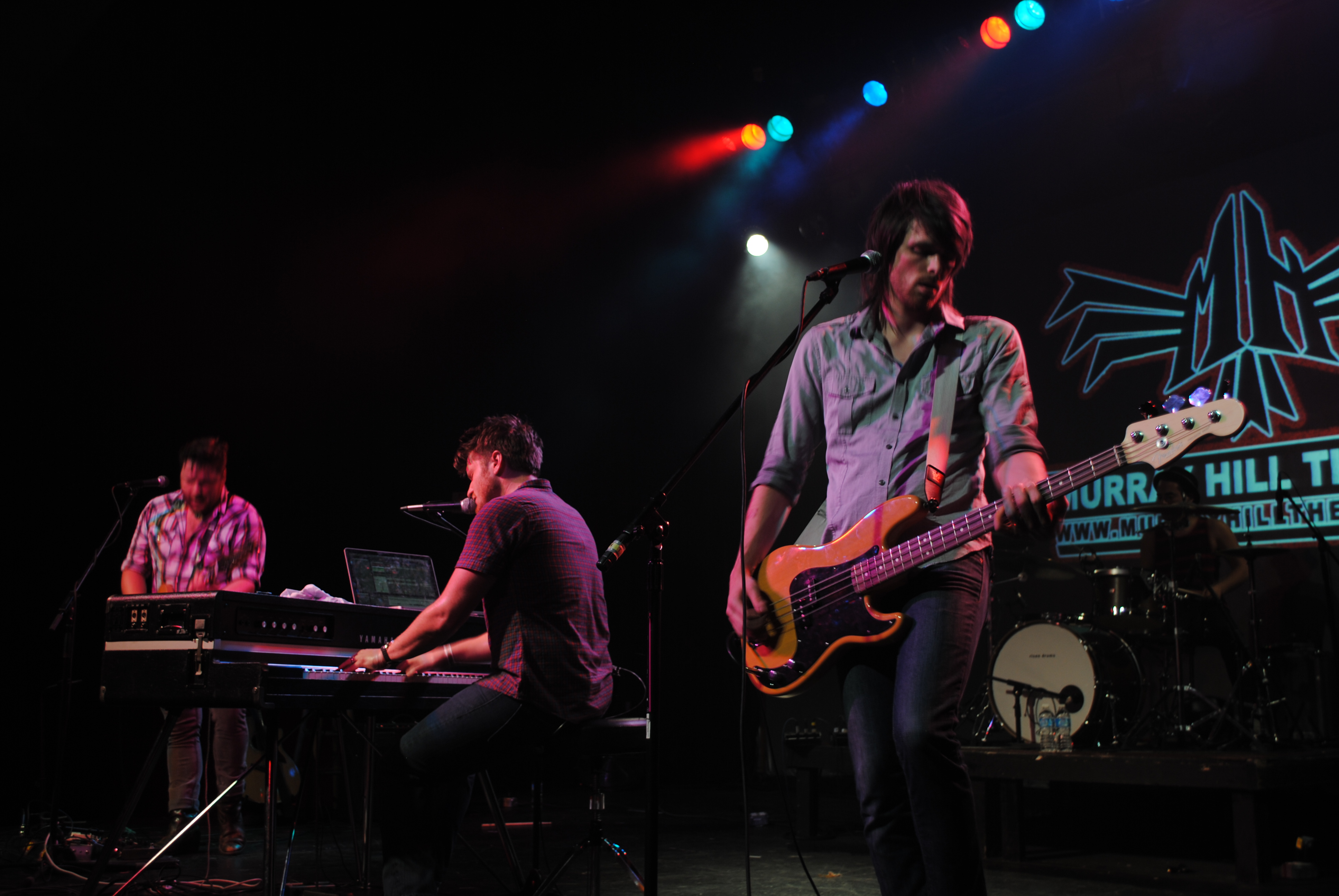
- Seabird performing in Jacksonville, Florida

Background information
- Origin: Independence, Kentucky
- Genres: Alternative rock, pop rock, indie rock, Christian rock
- Years active: 2004–present
- Label: Credential
- Members: Aaron Morgan; Jason Gann; Steven Bye; Ryan Morgan
- Past members: Brandon Weaver; Preston Lane; Micah Landers; David Smith; Aaron Hunt; Chris Kubik
- Website: SeabirdMusic.com

Seabird is an American alternative rock band from Independence, Kentucky. The band formed when Aaron Morgan, Micah Landers, and Aaron Hunt began playing songs with each other in 2004. The band soon added accordion player David Smith. After playing together for a little under a year both Landers and Smith left to pursue other interests. Soon after Chris Kubik joined the band to take the place of Landers on bass and Morgan began playing two keyboards to make up for the loss of the accordion. After adding Morgan's brother (Ryan) to play guitar, the band recorded their debut EP, Spread Your Broken Wings and Try, in one of the band members' rooms.

Their EP was passed to EMI and, after a personal showcase, the band was signed in 2005. However, a year later, the band switched from EMI to Credential Records. They continued to record material for a possible studio album from 2006 through most of 2007 and released a second EP, Let Me Go On, in mid-December 2007. This time, their second EP was used as a teaser for their upcoming debut studio album, 'Til We See the Shore, which was released on June 24, 2008. Their latest album Rocks into Rivers was released on December 15, 2009. On June 17, 2012, they completed their Kickstarter project which raised funds for a self-produced third full-length album. On May 13, 2013, the band announced the name of the Kickstarter project album to be Troubled Days with release date of July 16, 2013.

Seabird's songs were recently heard on Pushing Daisies, Numb3rs, and Grey's Anatomy. Seabird's song "Don't You Know You're Beautiful" was played at the beginning of the Ghost Whisperer Season 5 episode On Thin Ice.

== Band members ==
Current members

- Aaron Morgan – lead vocals, keyboards
- Jason Gann – bass guitar
- Steven Bye – drums
- Ryan Morgan – guitar

Former members

- Brandon Weaver - bass guitar
- Preston Lane - drums
- Micah Landers – bass guitar
- David Smith – accordion, keyboards
- Aaron Hunt – drums
- Chris Kubik – bass guitar

== Discography ==
=== Studio albums ===
Year	Title	Label
2008	'Til We See the Shore	Credential Recordings
2009	Rocks into Rivers	Credential Recordings
July 16, 2013	Troubled Days	Independent

=== EPs ===
- Spread Your Broken Wings and Try – May 24, 2005
- Let Me Go On – December 18, 2007
- Purevolume.com Acoustic Sessions
- The Silent Night EP – November 24, 2009
- Over the Hills and Everywhere EP: A Christmas EP - October 15, 2010

=== Compilation appearances ===
- X 2009 – "Rescue"

=== Singles ===
- "Rescue"
- "Not Alone"
- "Don't You Know You're Beautiful"
- "Trust"

=== Rare ===
- Live from the Vibe
