= The Phenomenal Handclap Band =

- Origin: New York, New York, United States
- Genres: Psychedelic soul; funk; post-disco; indie rock; alternative rock
- Years active: 2009–present
- Label: GOMMA/Toy Tonics, Magnifreeq, Razor N Tape, Nublu Records
- Members: Daniel Collás; Juliet Swango; Monika Heidemann
- Past members: Sean Marquand; Nick Movshon; Luke O'Malley; Patrick Wood; Laura Marin; Emily Panic; Joan Tick; Kenan Gündüz; Michael Rafalowich; Warren Stubbs
- Website: http://www.phenomenalhandclapband.org

The Phenomenal Handclap Band was formed in New York's East Village by producer Daniel Collás. Their first full-length record, the Phenomenal Handclap Band, featured such diverse talents as Aurelio Valle, Carol C, Jaleel Bunton, Jon Spencer, and Lady Tigra.

== Career ==
In 2011, the Phenomenal Handclap Band toured the US and UK with Bryan Ferry. Their second full-length album, Form & Control, was released February 13, 2012. AllMusic observed a "fresh, lively" record that recalls "the early-'80s dance-art-pop glory days of the Human League, OMD, and Heaven 17".

After a four-year hiatus, the band released the single "Traveler's Prayer" backed with "Stepped Into the Light" on their own Daptone Records imprint, Magnifreeq, in May 2017. Their next release, "Judge Not", in the autumn of 2018, would be their first release on Toy Tonics. They released three more singles over the next two years until their third studio album, PHB in May 2020.

In June 2020, the band wrote and performed the song "Sanctuary", produced by Collás and Luke Solomon, for the Horsemeat Disco album Love and Dancing.

In 2022, the Phenomenal Handclap Band was featured on the song "Try Again" from JKriv's EP of the same name, produced by Collás and JKriv.

In 2023, they released their EP Burning Bridges on Brooklyn's Razor N Tape label.

The band signed to New York's Nublu Records in late 2024 and released their first single on the label, "We Are Worlds Away" in July 2025.

== Discography ==
=== Studio albums ===
- The Phenomenal Handclap Band (2009)
- Remixes (2010)
- Form & Control (2012)
- PHB Loves NYC (2013)
- PHB (2020)

=== Singles and EPs ===
- "Baby" (2009)
- "15 To 20" (2009)
- "15 To 20/You'll Disappear" (2009)
- "Testimony (Cosmodelica Mixes)" 10", Ltd. (2010)
- "Anthony Mansfield Remixes" 12" (2010)
- "Walk The Night" (w/Peaches) 12" (2011)
- "The Right One" (2012)
- "Unknown Faces At Father James Park" (2012)
- "Shake" EP (2013)
- "Traveler's Prayer" b/w "Stepped Into the Light" (2017)
- "Judge Not" EP (Ray Mang Mixes) (2019)
- "Jail" EP (w/ Waajeed and Marcel Vogel remixes) (2019)
- ”Remain Silent” EP (w/ Superpitcher and Ray Mang remixes) (2019)
- ”Do What You Like” (2020)
- “Sanctuary” (with Horsemeat Disco) (2020)
- ”Try Again” (with JKriv and Nic Hanson) (2022)
- "Burning Bridges" EP (w/ Prins Thomas Diskomiks and Each Other remixes) (2023)
- "We Are Worlds Away" EP (featuring Morgan Phalen, Jaleel Bunton, and others) (2025)
