= Mind Chaos =

Studio album by Hockey
- Released: August 25, 2009
- Genres: Indie rock; funk rock; dance-punk
- Label: Capitol
- Producers: Jerry Harrison; Hockey

Hockey chronology
| Mind Chaos (2009) | Wyeth Is (2013) |

Mind Chaos is the first studio album by the Portland, Oregon, band Hockey, released in 2009.

== Background ==
Ben Grubin and Jeremy Reynolds formed Hockey in 2007 in Southern California. After recording a demo they were signed up by Sony Music to record an album with the ex-Talking Heads producer Jerry Harrison. When Sony dropped the band before the album was recorded, Grubin and Reynolds moved to Portland with the percussionist Anthony Stassi and the guitarist Brian White. After having some attention in the UK, the band was signed by Virgin in the UK and Europe, and Capitol Records in the USA, releasing the album in autumn 2009. The song "Work" was used on the soundtrack for the game MLB 09: The Show.

== Critical response ==
Professional ratings
Review scores
| Source | Rating |
|---|---|
| AllMusic | 3.5/5 stars |
| The Guardian | 3/5 stars |
| Pitchfork Media | (6.7/10) |
| Drowned in Sound | (6/10) |
| Belfast Telegraph | 3/5 stars |

The album received mixed reviews across a wide range of media. Metacritic, which aggregates reviews and ratings, shows a 68% score for Mind Chaos from twelve critics' reviews.

Reviewing for Drowned in Sound, Neil Ashman wrote, "...at their best they produce some thrilling pop music, and while failing to create a consistently brilliant album, tracks like 'Song Away', 'Too Fake' and 'Learn To Lose' sound good in any year." Similarly, Adam Conner-Simons at The Boston Globe summed up his review, "Derivative? Maybe, but at least it's deftly derived and delivered with purpose and spunk," and a 70% rating.

== Track listing ==
1. "Too Fake" – 4:07
2. "3 A.M. Spanish" – 4:09
3. "Learn to Lose – 3:51
4. "Work" – 5:04
5. "Song Away" – 3:18
6. "Curse This City" – 4:30
7. "Wanna Be Black" – 3:51
8. "Four Holy Photos" – 3:51
9. "Preacher" – 4:41
10. "Put the Game Down" – 5:40
11. "Everyone's the Same Age" – 2:55

== Chart performance ==
| Chart | Highest position |
|---|---|
| UK Album Chart | 33 |
| Billboard Top Heatseekers | 29 |
| French Album Chart | 155 |
