= The Phenomenal Handclap Band (album) =

Studio album by the Phenomenal Handclap Band
- Released: June 23, 2009
- Recorded: 2008
- Genre: Psychedelic soul, funk, post-disco, indie rock, alternative rock
- Length: 66:13
- Label: Friendly Fire Recordings (US), Tummy Touch Records (UK)
- Producer: Daniel Collás & Sean Marquand for Embassy Sound Productions (ESP)

The Phenomenal Handclap Band chronology
The Phenomenal Handclap Band (2009)	Remixes (2010)

Singles from The Phenomenal Handclap Band
- 1. "15 to 20" Released: 2009; 2. "Baby"

Professional ratings
Review scores
Source	Rating
Drowned in Sound	6/10
Pitchfork	6.2/10
NME	4/5 stars

The Phenomenal Handclap Band is the first full-length album from the Phenomenal Handclap Band, released on June 23, 2009. The album includes the single "15 to 20" and features guest musicians from bands such as TV on the Radio, the Dap-Kings, Jon Spencer, and Lady Tigra. It was followed up by a remix album, Remixes.

== Track listing ==
No.	Title	Writer(s)	Length
1.	"The Journey to Serra Da Estrela"	Collás	6:05
2.	"All of the Above"	Collás	5:37
3.	"Testimony"	Marquand, Collás, Valle	5:01
4.	"Give It a Rest"	Marquand, Collás, O'Malley	4:36
5.	"You'll Disappear"	Collás	6:29
6.	"15 to 20"	Collás, Marquand	4:49
7.	"Dim the Lights"	Marquand, Phalen	6:08
8.	"I Been Born Again"	Kaylan, Volman	4:52
9.	"The Martyr"	Collás	5:44
10.	"Tears"	Marquand	3:46
11.	"Baby"	Collás	4:12
12.	"The Circle Is Broken"	Collás	8:59
Total length:			66:13
