= Drummer (band) =

American indie rock band

- Origin: Akron, Ohio, United States
- Genre: Indie rock
- Years active: 2009
- Label: Audio Eagle Records
- Members: Patrick Carney; Jamie Stillman; Stephen Clements; John Finley; Greg Boyd

Drummer was an American indie rock band from Akron, Ohio. The band was founded by The Black Keys' drummer Patrick Carney who plays bass guitar. All the members of the band are drummers in other groups from Ohio.

== History ==
In February 2009 Carney created the group with Jamie Stillman, the drummer from Teeth of the Hydra after Carney's fellow Black Keys member Dan Auerbach was on tour for his debut solo album, Keep It Hid. Stillman envisioned the band having a joyful and upbeat sound and recommended Jon Finley from Party of Helicopters and Beaten Awake to contribute vocals and guitar. Steven Clements, formerly of Houseguest, joined to play keyboards and provide backup vocals. Shortly thereafter, the band enlisted Greg Boyd from Ghostman & Sandman as their drummer. Their first album was recorded in Akron, Ohio, with sound engineer Ben Vehorn, known for his work with bands Love as Laughter and Houseguest.

== Band members ==
- Patrick Carney – bass guitar
- Gregory Boyd – drums
- Steve Clements – vocals, keyboards
- Jon Finley – vocals, guitar
- Jamie Stillman – guitar

== Discography ==
Studio album

- Feel Good Together – 2009

== See also ==
- Music of Ohio
- The Black Keys
