= Polly Scattergood =

English singer and songwriter (born 1986)

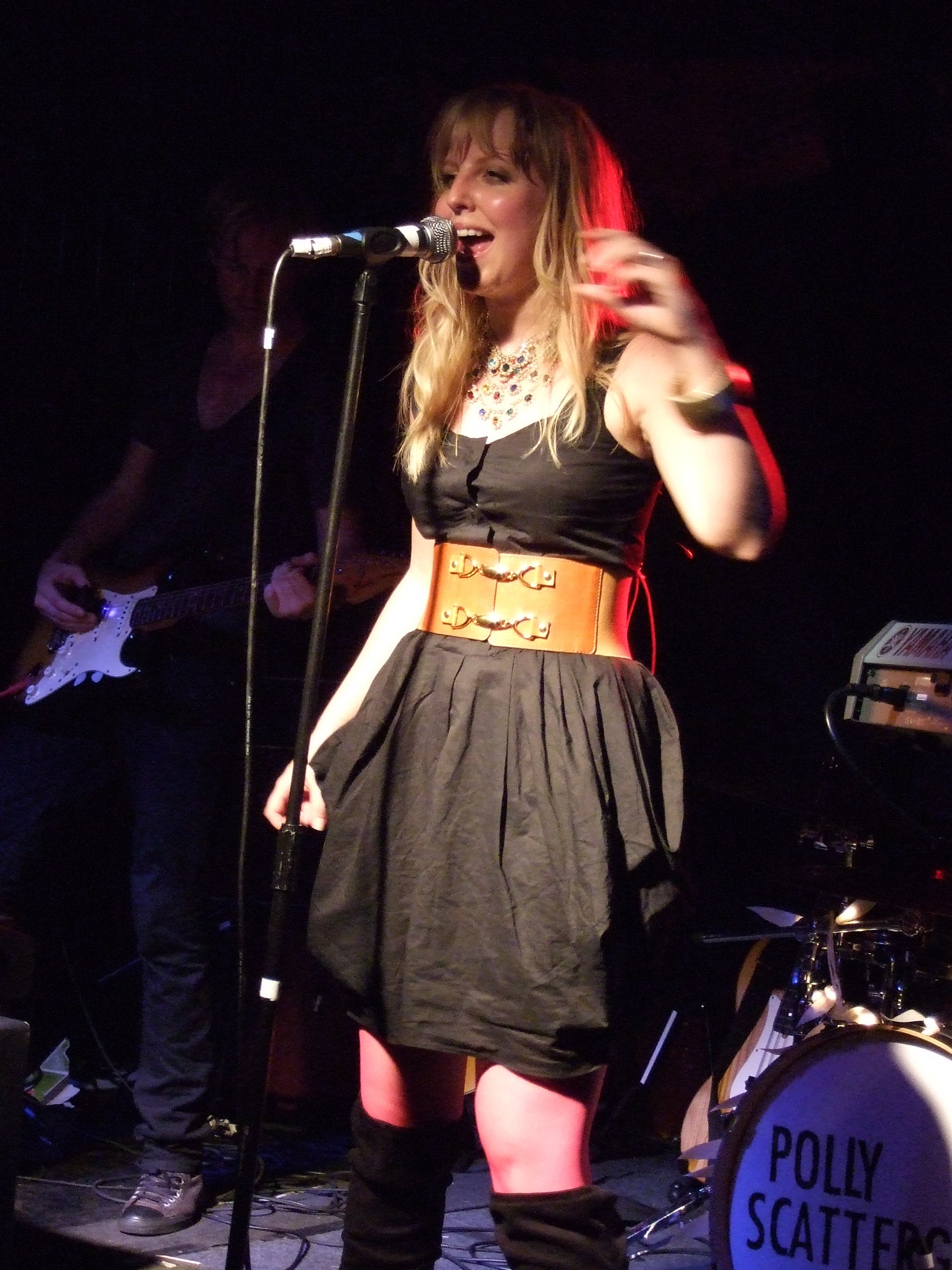
- Scattergood performing in August 2008

Background information
- Born: 18 October 1986 (age 39); Wivenhoe, Essex, England
- Genres: Indie pop; experimental; alternative rock
- Occupations: Singer; songwriter
- Years active: 2005–present
- Labels: Ark; Mute; Future Paradise
- Website: pollyscattergood.com

Polly Scattergood (born 18 October 1986) is an English singer and songwriter. She has been described as ethereal, dark, intense and quirky, while her musical style has been described as "early 21st century electro-dance-pop of London proper".

== Early life ==
Scattergood was born in Wivenhoe, Essex and grew up near Colchester, the eldest of three siblings with two younger brothers.

Her mother was an artist and her father an actor. Scattergood's first memory of making music was playing a toy piano when she was aged four. At the age of 16, she moved to London to attend the BRIT School, a performing arts academy.

== Career ==
After graduation she caught the attention of music industry executive Neil Ferris who took on her management. Ferris then introduced Scattergood to Daniel Miller head of Mute Records. He led her to the producer of her debut album Simon Fisher Turner.

Scattergood's debut single entitled "Glory Hallelujah" was released in 2005 on Ark Records and produced by Greg Walsh. Her September 2007 single "Nitrogen Pink" was released on Mute Records. The single "I Hate the Way" which was written on a toy keyboard was released on 22 September 2008 on both limited edition 10 inch vinyl and iTunes.

Her eponymous debut studio album, Polly Scattergood, was released 9 March 2009 in the UK. and on 19 May in the US.

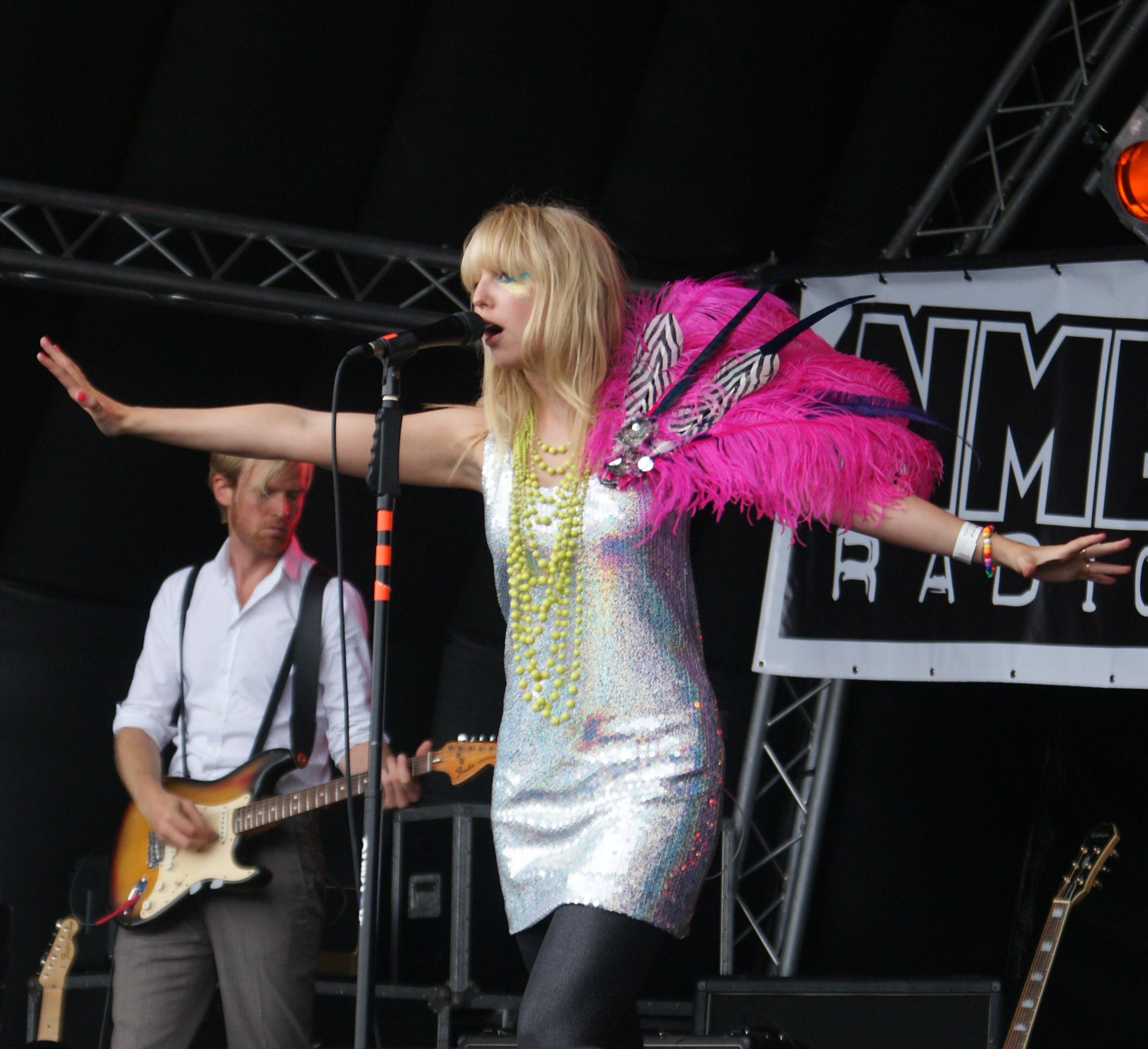
Scattergood performing in 2009

"Other Too Endless" was released as a single from the album on 23 February 2009. It was named "record of the week" on the Steve Lamacq show. The download version features a remix by Vince Clarke. iTunes made it 'Single of the Week' on 30 March 2009. "Please Don't Touch" was her fourth single, released on 4 May 2009.

She then re-released "Nitrogen Pink" and released "Bunny Club" as singles. On 7 March 2009 Scattergood gave a live studio session on the BBC Radio 2 Dermot O'Leary show. She supported Amanda Palmer in September 2009 at Union Chapel, Islington.

In 2011 Scattergood recorded a cover of "New York New York" for EA Games "The Wall" trailer. It premiered in Time Square, "The Wall" trailer won the Mi6 Gold award for "Best Use of Sound" and the Mi6 Silver award for "Best Game Footage Trailer. In 2012 she remixed the M83 song "Reunion".

Scattergood released her second studio album, Arrows, on 22 October 2013. The album was produced by Ken Thomas who has previously worked with Sigur Rós and M83. "Wanderlust" was remixed by Charli XCX and "How to Dress Well" featured in America's Billboard magazine. The album was awarded four stars by Mojo, The Independent and Rolling Stone magazine. Scattergood supported Mute labelmates Goldfrapp at the summer series 2013 concerts at Somerset House, London on 20 July 2013.

After Arrows was released Scattergood decided to team up with her label mate James Chapman, a.k.a. the Mercury Nominated artist Maps, to write and record a joint project, entitled "onDeadWaves". which eventually led in 2016 to the release of the 'onDeadWaves' album.

After the 'onDeadWaves' album was released Scattergood was approached by Bruce Woolley to records a new version of the Buggles' track, "Video Killed the Radio Star" which was eventually to be titled "Dark Star". This new version was released by Grammaphone records in 2017.

Scattergood released her third album entitled In This Moment on 3 July 2020.

In November 2021, Scattergood created a podcast with long-time friend Katie Melua called "The Detail" about the art of songwriting and making records".

In March 2025, the band was featured on vocals on a track called "And All Went Dark," on a new album released by Chris Liebing.

== Discography ==
=== Studio albums ===
Year	Album	Peak chart positions
Year	Album	UK
2009	Polly Scattergood: Released 9 March 2009	–
2013	Arrows: Released 21 October 2013	–
2020	In This Moment: Released 3 July 2020	–

=== Singles ===
Year	Single	Album
2005	"Glory Hallelujah"	Glory Hallelujah – EP
2007	"Nitrogen Pink"	Polly Scattergood
2008	"I Hate the Way"	Polly Scattergood
2009	"Other Too Endless"	Polly Scattergood
2009	"Please Don't Touch"	Polly Scattergood
2009	"Nitrogen Pink"	Polly Scattergood
2009	"Bunny Club"	Polly Scattergood
2013	"Wanderlust"	Arrows
2013	"Cocoon"	Arrows
2014	"Subsequently Lost"	Arrows
2019	"Sphere"	In This Moment
2020	"Red"	In This Moment
