= Fine Fascination =

Studio album by Red Light Company
- Released: 2 March 2009
- Recorded: 2008
- Genre: Alternative rock
- Label: Lavolta
- Producer: Adrian Bushby

Singles from Fine Fascination
- 1. "With Lights Out" Released: 26 May 2008; 2. "Meccano" Released: 11 August 2008; 3. "Scheme Eugene" Released: 3 November 2008; 4. "Arts & Crafts" Released: 2 March 2009

Fine Fascination is the debut album from multi-national, London, England-based rock band Red Light Company. The album is set for release on Lavolta/Sony BMG on 2 March 2009 in the UK. The album was produced by Adrian Bushby (U2, Placebo, Foo Fighters). Initial pressings of Fine Fascination ordered on online outlets only come with a limited edition 5-track bonus disc. Despite the album's promo CDs being watermarked, the entire album leaked onto the internet on 7 February 2009.

Three singles preceded the album's release: "With Lights Out," their debut EP, in May 2008; "Meccano" in August 2008; and "Scheme Eugene" in November 2008. The single "Arts & Crafts" coincides with the album release on the same day.

== Critical reception ==
Professional ratings
Review scores
Source	Rating
Allmusic	(not yet rated)
BBC	(positive)
Clash Music	(positive)
Dotmusic	(9/10)
The Fly	3.5/5 stars
The Guardian	3/5 stars
NME	(3/10)

In a generally positive review, Clash Music concluded that "To some, RLC's flagrant flaunting of ambition can seem distasteful and, one thing's for certain, if you've your crosshairs trained on arenas then you'd better have the ammunition to back up the big time posturing. At times here they fall short – slingshot aimed at the moon short – but often their aim rings true. And on these occasions they are devastating."

== Track listing ==
1. "Words of Spectacular" – 3:41
2. "Scheme Eugene" – 3:25
3. "Arts & Crafts" – 4:13
4. "First We Land" – 2:50
5. "With Lights Out" – 4:08
6. "New Jersey Television" – 3:40
7. "The Architect" – 3:38
8. "Meccano" – 3:15
9. "When Everyone Is Everybody Else" – 4:51
10. "The Alamo" – 3:46

=== Bonus disc ===
1. "Fine Fascination"
2. "Dirty Water"
3. "Bahnhof Zoo"
4. "Red Light Company"
5. "Sinking Ship"

== Credits ==
- Richard Frenneaux – vocals, guitar
- Shawn Day – bass, vocals
- Paul Mellon – guitar
- Chris Edmonds – keyboards, vocals
- James Griffiths – drums
