= Red Light Company =

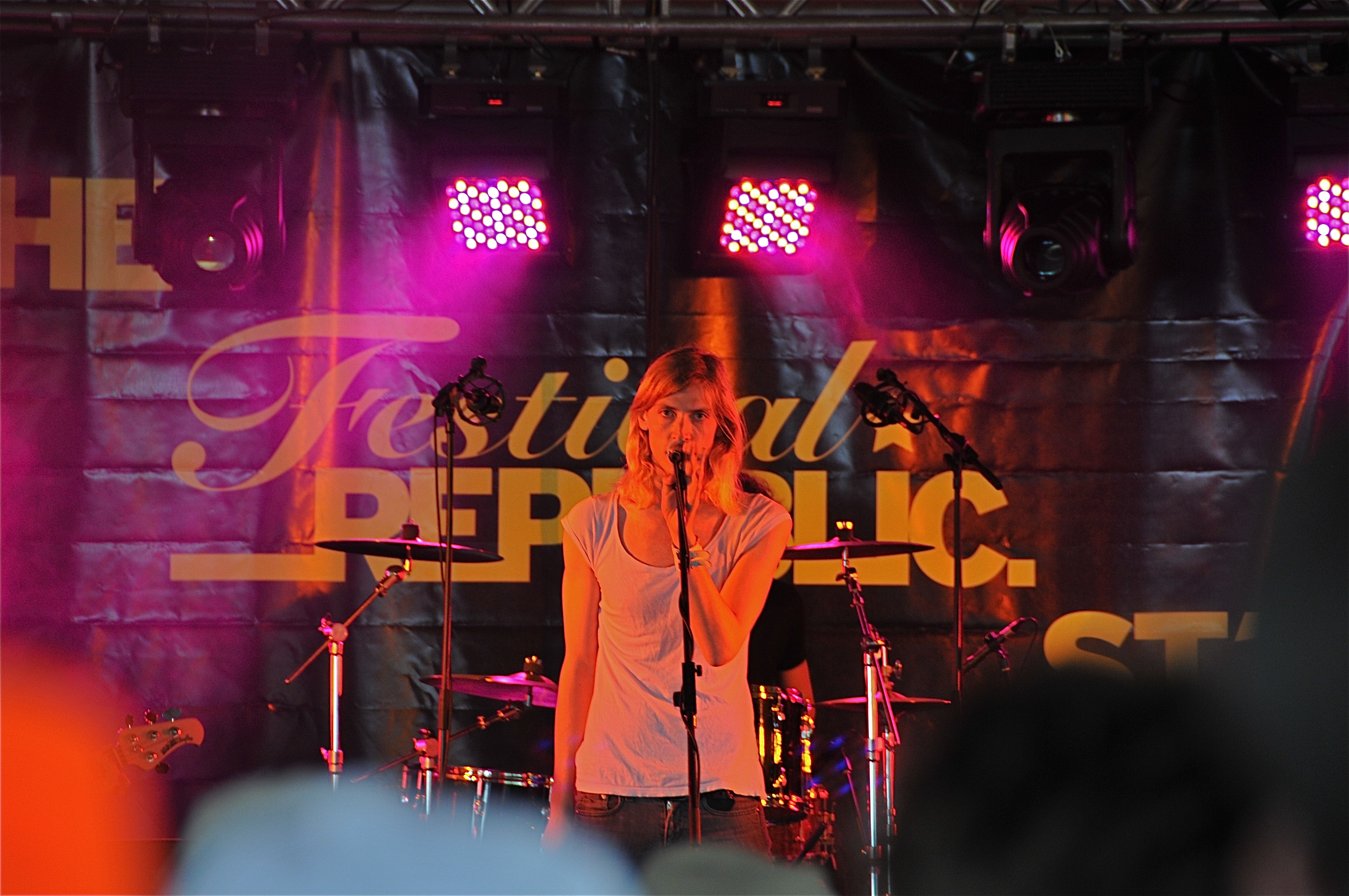
- Richard Frenneaux at the Reading Festival in 2008.

Background information
- Origin: London, United Kingdom
- Genres: Alternative rock Indie rock Post-punk revival
- Years active: 2007–2009
- Labels: Lavolta Records; Sony BMG
- Members: Richard Frenneaux (vocals, guitar); Paul Mellon (guitar); Chris Edmonds (keyboards, vocals); James Griffiths (drums)
- Past members: Shawn Day (bass, vocals)
- Website: redlightcompany.co.uk

Red Light Company were a five-piece alternative rock band based in London, England. The band was formed in 2007 by members Richard Frenneaux (vocals/guitar), Shawn Day (bass), James Griffiths (drums), Paul Mellon (guitar) and Chris Edmonds (keyboards). They came together following an advert Richard posted on the internet, to which Shawn quickly responded, and moved from his home in Wyoming, United States to London in order to pursue making music with the rest of the group.

Signed to Lavolta Records, Red Light Company received favourable comparisons to Arcade Fire, U2 and Editors.

The band toured with Editors in early 2008, before releasing their debut single "With Lights Out," about a childhood friend of Frenneaux's who committed suicide. Their second single "Meccano" was released on 11 August 2008, followed by their third single "Scheme Eugene" on 3 November 2008.

Red Light Company were named as one of the hottest new bands of 2009 by both NME and HMV. Their debut album Fine Fascination was released on 2 March 2009, along with their fourth single "Arts & Crafts" on the same day.

On 16 June 2009 the band's myspace blog posted that Shawn Day (bass, vocals) had left the band to pursue other projects, they also wrote they would be re-releasing "Meccano" on 3 August 2009, almost a whole year since the previous version, with the public assumption of a slightly different sound without Day's bass and vocal parts.

Red Light Company played their final show at V Festival 2009, they since announced that the band was no longer together.

Richard Frenneaux has now started a new band, Anothers Blood, with a scheduled release for their first single, "Lost Communication" on 3 October 2011.

== Discography ==
=== Albums ===
- Fine Fascination No. 13 UK

=== Singles ===
Song	Date	UK Singles Chart	Album
"With Lights Out"	26 May 2008	-	Fine Fascination
"Meccano"	11 August 2008	-	Fine Fascination
"Scheme Eugene"	3 November 2008	#69	Fine Fascination
"Arts & Crafts"	2 March 2009	#53	Fine Fascination
"Meccano"	17 August 2009	-	
