= This Time (Robert Cray album) =

Studio album by Robert Cray
- Released: August 11, 2009
- Recorded: Santa Barbara Sound Design, Santa Barbara, California
- Genre: Blues
- Length: 47:11
- Label: Vanguard, Nozzle
- Producer: Robert Cray

Robert Cray chronology
Live At The BBC (2008)	This Time (2009)	Cookin' In Mobile (2010)

Professional ratings
Review scores
Source	Rating
AllMusic	3.5/5 stars
PopMatters	6/10 stars

This Time is a blues album by Robert Cray. It was released on August 11, 2009, through Vanguard Records, and Nozzle Records. It is his first studio album in four years, also featuring a reconstructed line-up. The Robert Cray Band toured in the United States supporting the album. They appeared on the Late Show with David Letterman on August 18, 2009, promoting the album, and played the song "Trouble and Pain"

== Track listing ==
1. "Chicken in the Kitchen" (Cray) - 6:05
2. "I Can't Fail" (Cray) - 3:32
3. "Love 2009" (Pugh) - 6:24
4. "That's What Keeps Me Rockin'" (Braungel, Schell) - 5:36
5. "This Time" (Cray) - 7:22
6. "To Be True" (Pugh, Cousins) - 5:14
7. "Forever Goodbye'" (Cray, Sue Turner-Cray) - 4:33
8. "Trouble and Pain" (Cray) - 4:04
9. "Truce" (Cousins, Hendrix Ackle) - 5:41

== The Robert Cray Band ==
- Robert Cray – vocals, guitar
- Jim Pugh – keyboards
- Richard Cousins – bass guitar
- Tony Braunagel – drums
