= Rocks into Rivers =

Rocks Into Rivers

Studio album by Seabird
- Released: December 15, 2009
- Genre: Contemporary Christian music
- Length: 47:16
- Label: Credential Recordings
- Producer: Matt Hales; Paul Moak

Seabird chronology
'Til We See the Shore (2008)	Rocks Into Rivers (2009)	Over the Hills And Everywhere EP (2010)

Professional ratings
Review scores
Source	Rating
Jesus Freak Hideout	4/5 stars

Rocks Into Rivers is the second studio album by Christian alternative rock band Seabird. The album was released on December 15, 2009 on Credential Recordings. The first single from the album is "Don't You Know You're Beautiful".

== Track listing ==
1. Don't You Know You're Beautiful
2. Believe Me
3. Sing To Save My Life
4. Trust
5. The Good King
6. Baby I'm In Love
7. This Ain't Home
8. The Sound Of You And I
9. Don't Change A Thing
10. This Road
11. Finally Done Right
12. Rocks Into Rivers
