= Robert Cray discography =

This is the discography of American blues musician Robert Cray.

== Albums ==
=== Studio albums ===
List of studio albums, with selected chart positions, sales figures and certifications
Title	Details	Peak chart positions										Certifications	Sales
Title	Details	US	AUS	DEN	FRA	GER	NLD	NZ	SWE	SWI	UK	Certifications	Sales
Who's Been Talkin'	Released: March 1980; Label: Tomato; Format: CD, LP	—	32	—	—	—	66	29	—	—	—		
Bad Influence	Released: August 1983; Label: HighTone; Format: CD, LP	143	89	—	—	—	—	20	—	—	—		US: 13,000
False Accusations	Released: October 1985; Label: HighTone; Format: CD, LP	141	30	—	—	—	25	17	—	—	68	BPI: Silver; RMNZ: Gold	US: 350,000
Strong Persuader	Released: November 17, 1986; Label: Mercury; Format: CD, LP	13	6	—	—	—	1	5	—	—	34	ARIA: Platinum; BPI: Silver; CRIA: Gold; NVPI: Platinum; RIAA: 2× Platinum; RMNZ: 4× Platinum	
Don't Be Afraid of the Dark	Released: August 8, 1988; Label: Mercury; Format: CD, LP	32	17	—	—	28	1	6	—	7	13	ARIA: Gold; BPI: Gold; CRIA: Gold; NVPI: Gold; RIAA: Gold; RMNZ: 2× Platinum	
Too Many Cooks	Released: March 1989; Label: Tomato; Format: CD, LP	—	—	—	—	—	—	—	—	—	—		
Midnight Stroll	Released: September 18, 1990; Label: Mercury; Format: CD, LP	51	34	—	—	—	29	38	36	32	19	ARIA: Gold; BPI: Silver; RIAA: Gold; RMNZ: Gold	
I Was Warned	Released: August 31, 1992; Label: Mercury; Format: CD, LP	103	99	—	—	—	42	—	—	27	29		
Shame + A Sin	Released: October 5, 1993; Label: Mercury; Format: CD, LP	143	—	—	—	—	—	—	—	—	48		
Some Rainy Morning	Released: May 9, 1995; Label: Mercury; Format: CD, LP	127	—	—	—	—	89	—	—	—	63		
Sweet Potato Pie	Released: May 5, 1997; Label: Mercury; Format: CD, LP	184	—	—	—	—	—	—	—	—	—		
Take Your Shoes Off	Released: April 27, 1999; Label: Rykodisc; Format: CD, LP	181	—	—	—	—	—	—	—	—	99		
Shoulda Been Home	Released: May 15, 2001; Label: Rykodisc; Format: CD, LP	—	—	—	—	—	—	—	—	—	—		
Time Will Tell	Released: July 1, 2003; Label: Sanctuary; Format: CD, LP	—	—	—	—	—	—	—	—	—	—		
Twenty	Released: May 24, 2005; Label: Sanctuary; Format: CD, LP	—	—	—	—	—	—	—	—	—	—		
This Time	Released: August 11, 2009; Label: Nozzle/Vanguard; Format: CD, LP	—	—	—	—	—	—	—	—	—	—		
Nothin but Love	Released: August 21, 2012; Label: Provogue; Format: CD, LP	187	—	32	125	36	24	—	—	44	62		
In My Soul	Released: March 31, 2014; Label: Provogue; Format: CD, LP	128	—	—	130	69	28	—	—	46	43		
Robert Cray & Hi Rhythm	Released: April 28, 2017; Label: Jay-Vee/Warner; Format: CD, LP	—	—	—	—	—	168	—	—	71	76		
That's What I Heard	Released: February 28, 2020; Label: Nozzle/Universal; Format: CD, LP	—	—	—	—	75	—	—	—	47	—		
"—" denotes a recording that did not chart or was not released in that territory.

=== Collaborative albums ===
List of collaborative albums, with chart positions and sales figures
Title	Details	Peak chart positions										Sales
Title	Details	US	AUS	DEN	FRA	GER	NLD	NZ	SWE	SWI	UK	Sales
Showdown! (with Albert Collins and Johnny Copeland)	Released: 1985; Label: Alligator; Format: CD, LP	124	85	—	99	—	54	45	—	—	—	US: 175,000
3× Gold (with INXS and Wet Wet Wet)	Released: June 5, 1988; Label: Gold Collections; Format: CD, LP	—	—	—	—	—	38	—	—	—	—	
In Concert (with Albert Collins)	Released: 1999; Label: Indigo; Format: CD, LP	—	—	—	—	—	—	—	—	—	—	
"—" denotes a recording that did not chart or was not released in that territory.

== Extended plays ==
List of extended plays
Title	EP details
The Midnight Stroll	Released: June 1, 1990; Label: Polygram; Formats: CD, LP, MC

== Singles ==
Year	Title	US Rock	US Hot 100	UK Singles
1986	"Smoking Gun"	2	22	-
1987	"I Guess I Showed Her"	28	-	-
1987	"Right Next Door (Because of Me)"	27	80	50
1987	"Nothin' But a Woman"	-	-	-
1988	"Don't Be Afraid of the Dark"	4	74	-
1988	"Night Patrol"	49	-	-
1989	"Acting This Way"	24	-	-
1990	"Consequences"	32	-	-
1990	"The Forecast (Calls for Pain)"	11	-	-
1992	"Just a Loser"	33	-	-
1993	"1040 Blues"	-	-	-
1996	"Baby Lee" (John Lee Hooker with Robert Cray)	-	-	65
2014	"You Move Me"	-	-	-
