= Grammy Award for Best Contemporary Blues Album =

Award for best contemporary Blues album

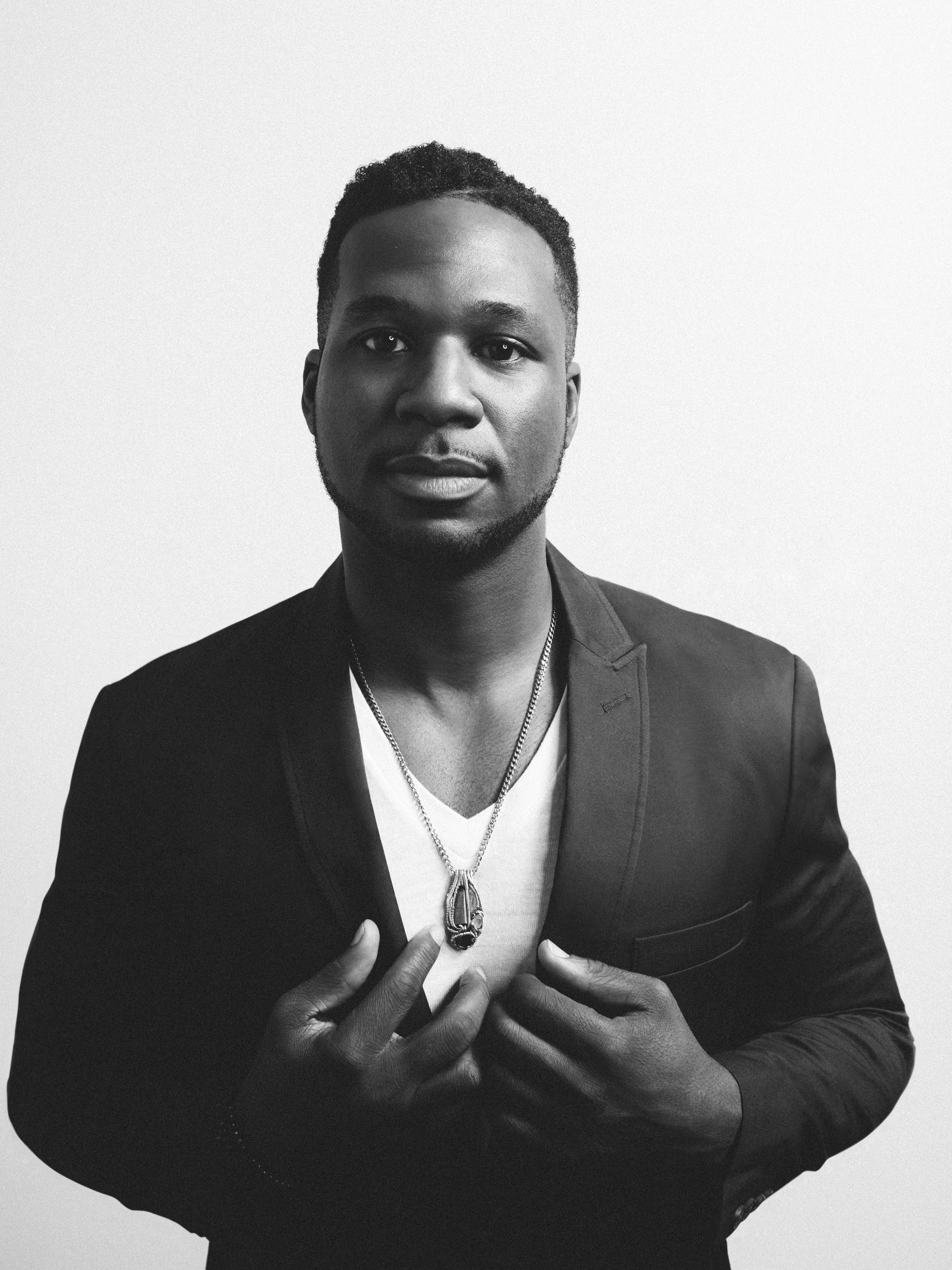
- Preacher Kids by Robert Randolph is the current recipient.
- Awarded for: quality contemporary blues albums
- Country: United States
- Presented by: National Academy of Recording Arts and Sciences
- First award: 1988
- Currently held by: Robert Randolph – Preacher Kids (2026)
- Website: grammy.com

The Grammy Award for Best Contemporary Blues Album was awarded from 1988 to 2011 and from 2017 onwards. Until 1992 the award was known as Best Contemporary Blues Performance and in 1989 was awarded to a song rather than to an album.

The award was discontinued after the 2011 Grammy season in a major overhaul of Grammy categories. From 2012 onwards, the category was merged with the Best Traditional Blues Album category to form the new Best Blues Album category. However, in 2016 the Grammy organisation decided to revert the situation back to the pre-2012 era, with two separate categories for traditional and contemporary blues recordings respectively.

Years reflect the year in which the Grammy Awards were handed out, for music released in the previous year. Buddy Guy and Keb' Mo hold the record of most wins in the category with four each, followed by Robert Cray, Stevie Ray Vaughan, Taj Mahal and Fantastic Negrito, all with three wins.

== Recipients ==
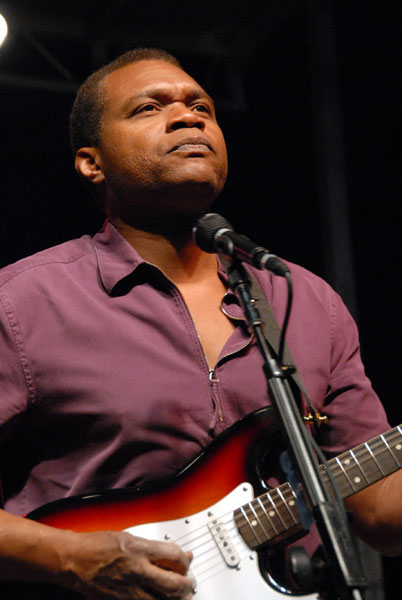
Three-time winner Robert Cray.

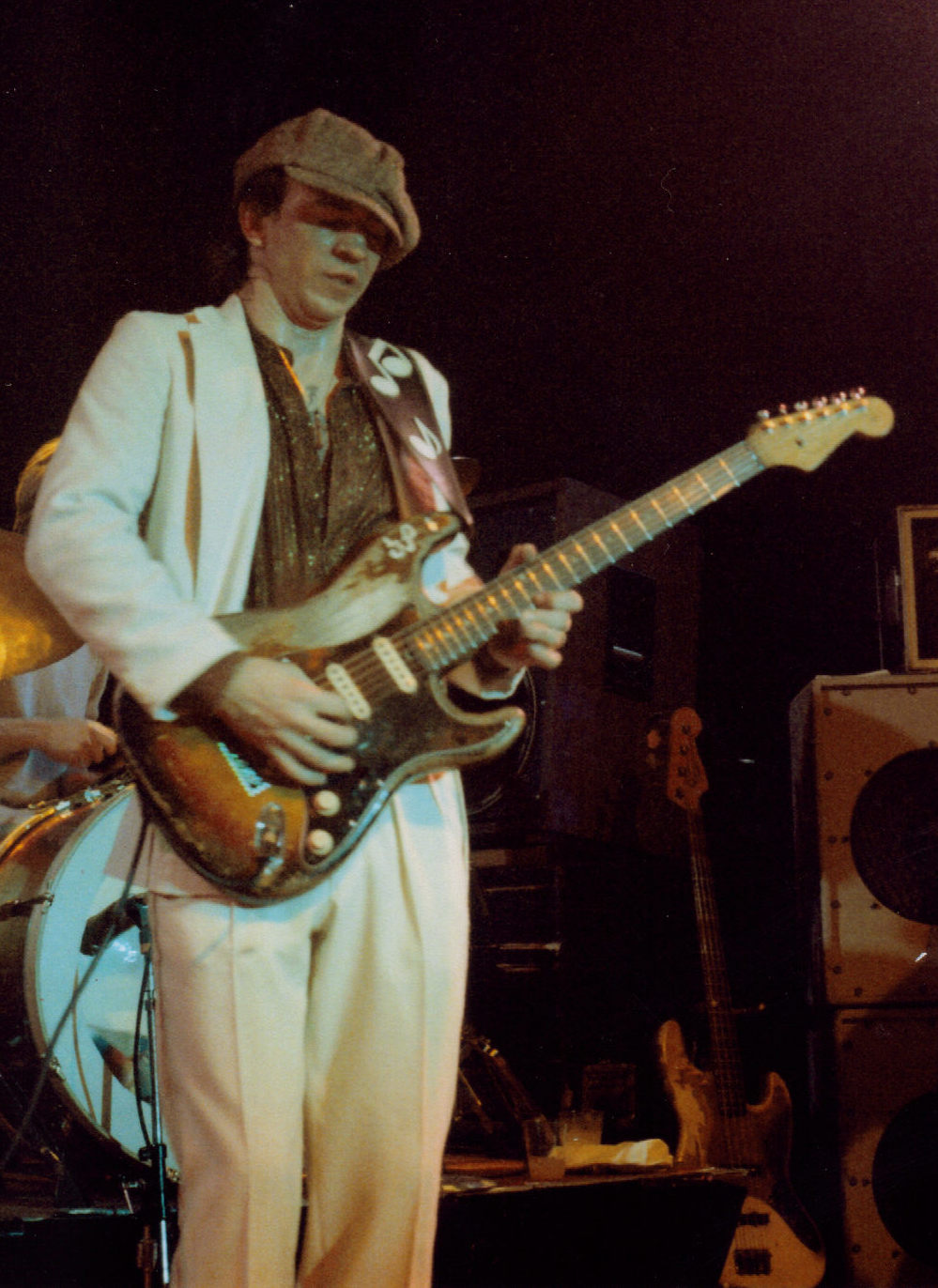
Three-time winner Stevie Ray Vaughan.

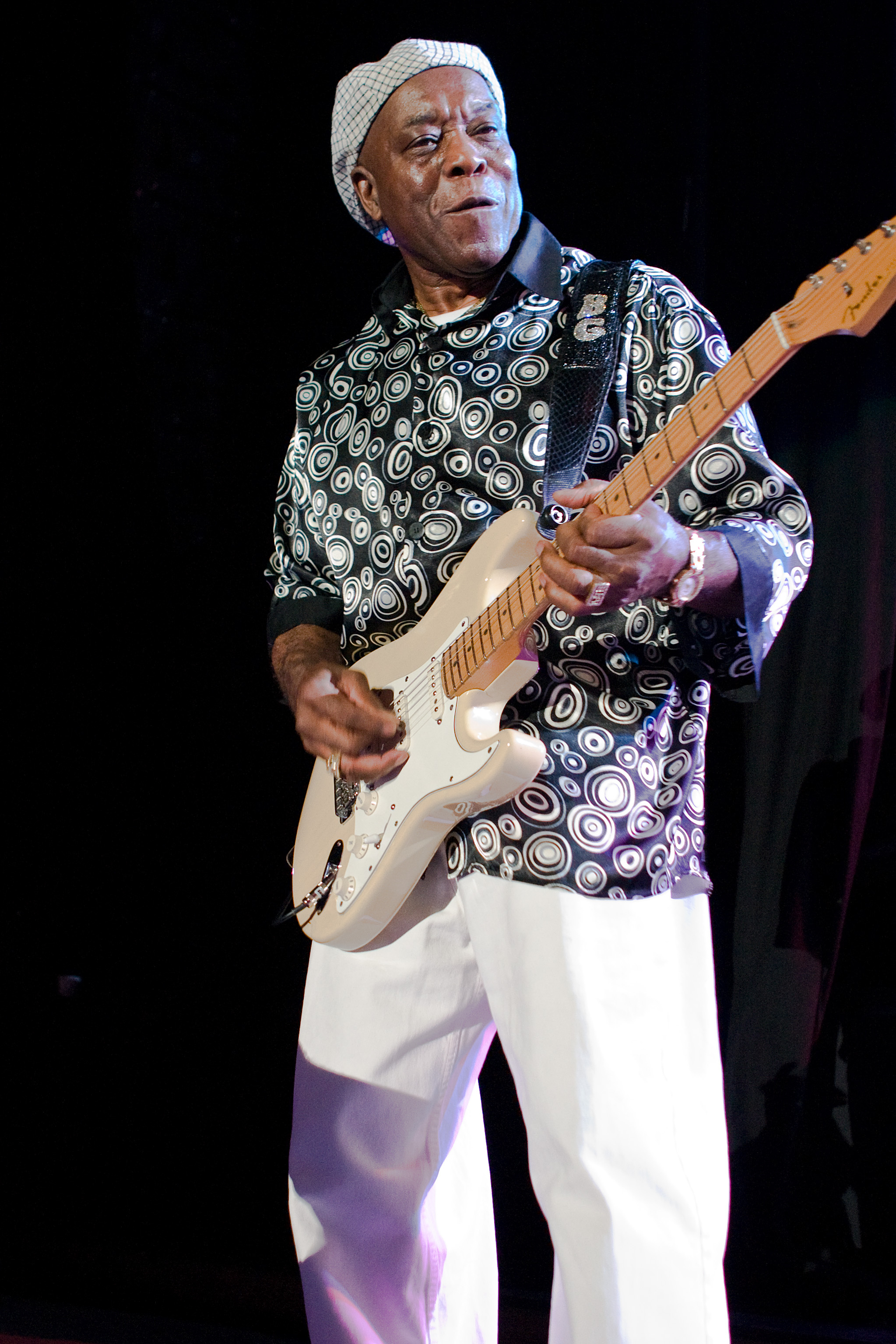
Four-time winner Buddy Guy.

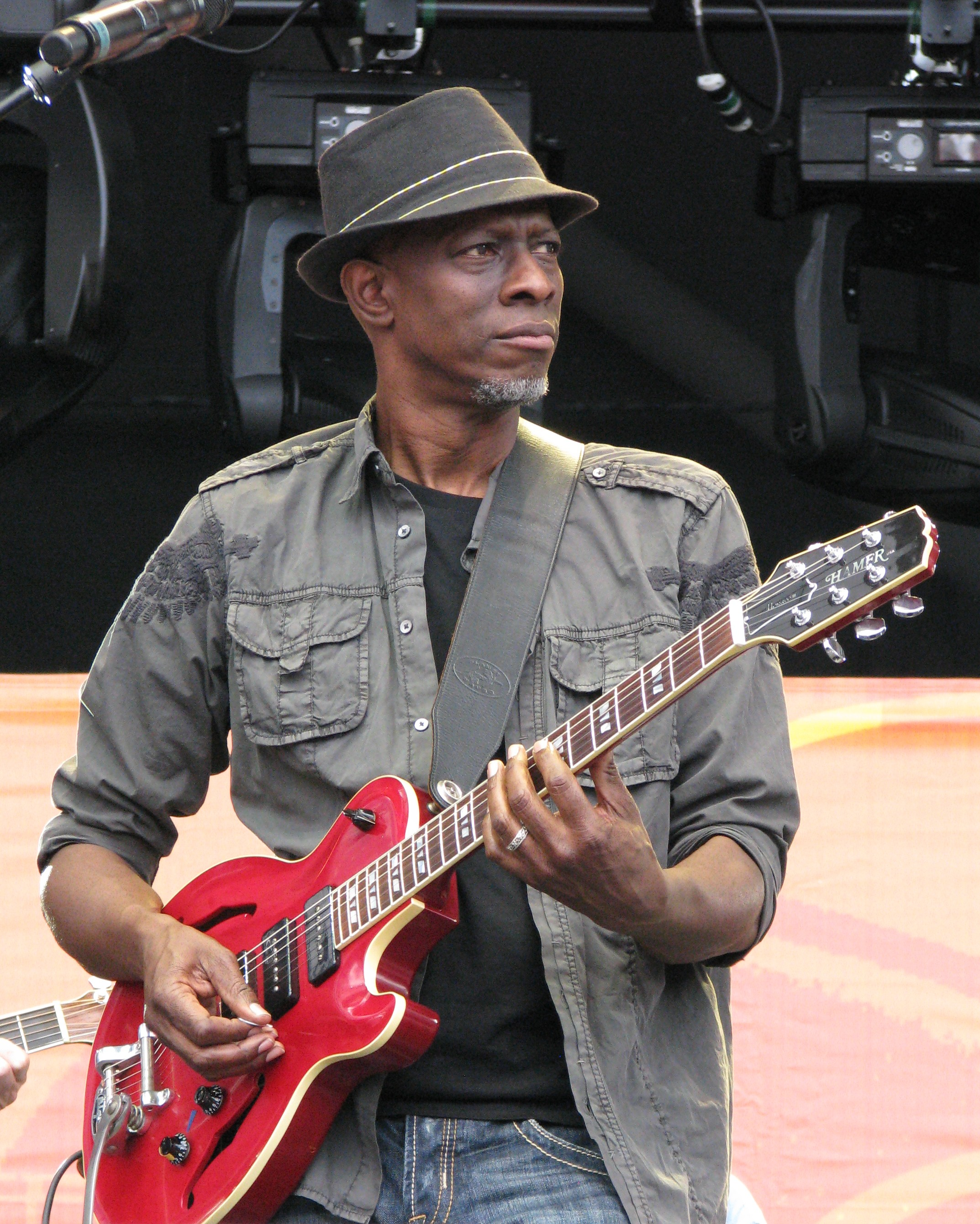
Four-time winner Keb' Mo.

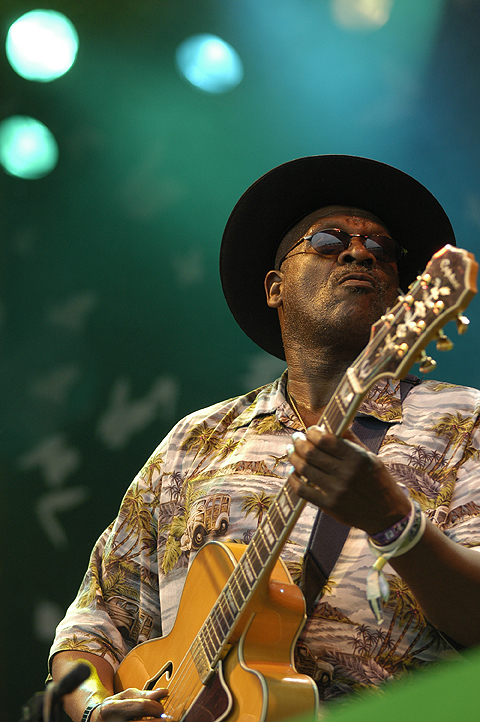
Three-time winner Taj Mahal.

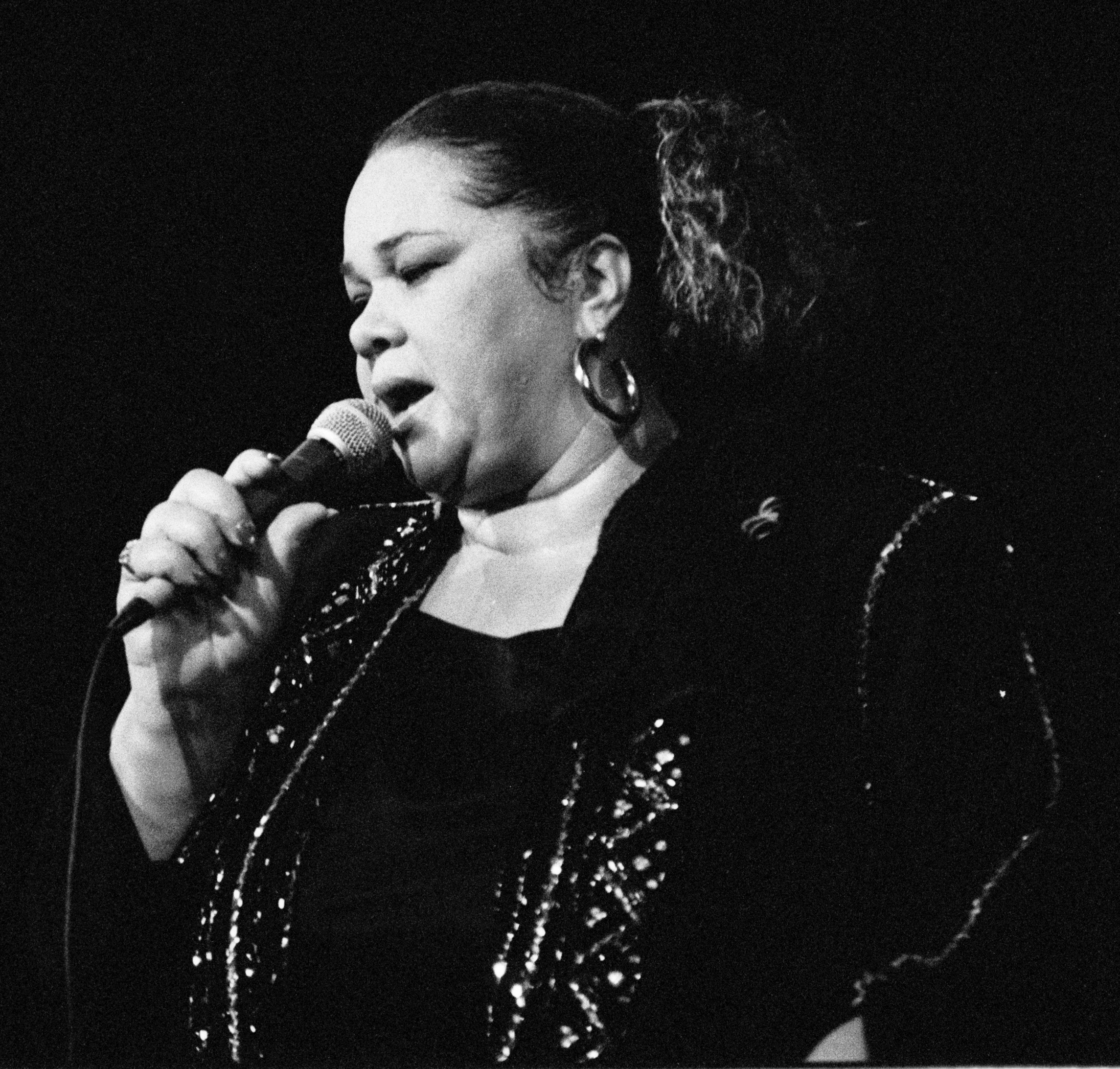
Etta James, the first of the two female winners of the award.

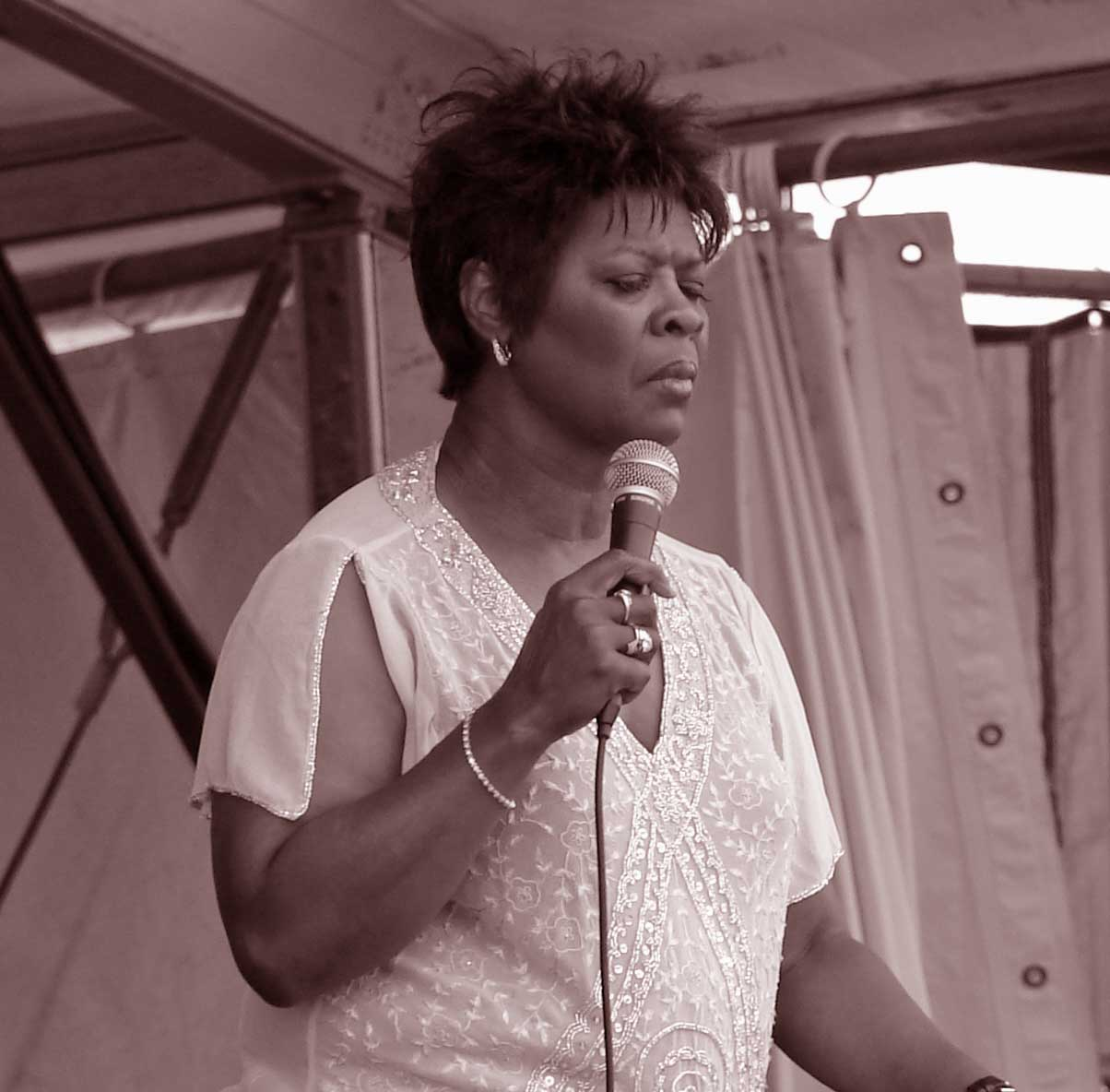
2007 winner Irma Thomas.

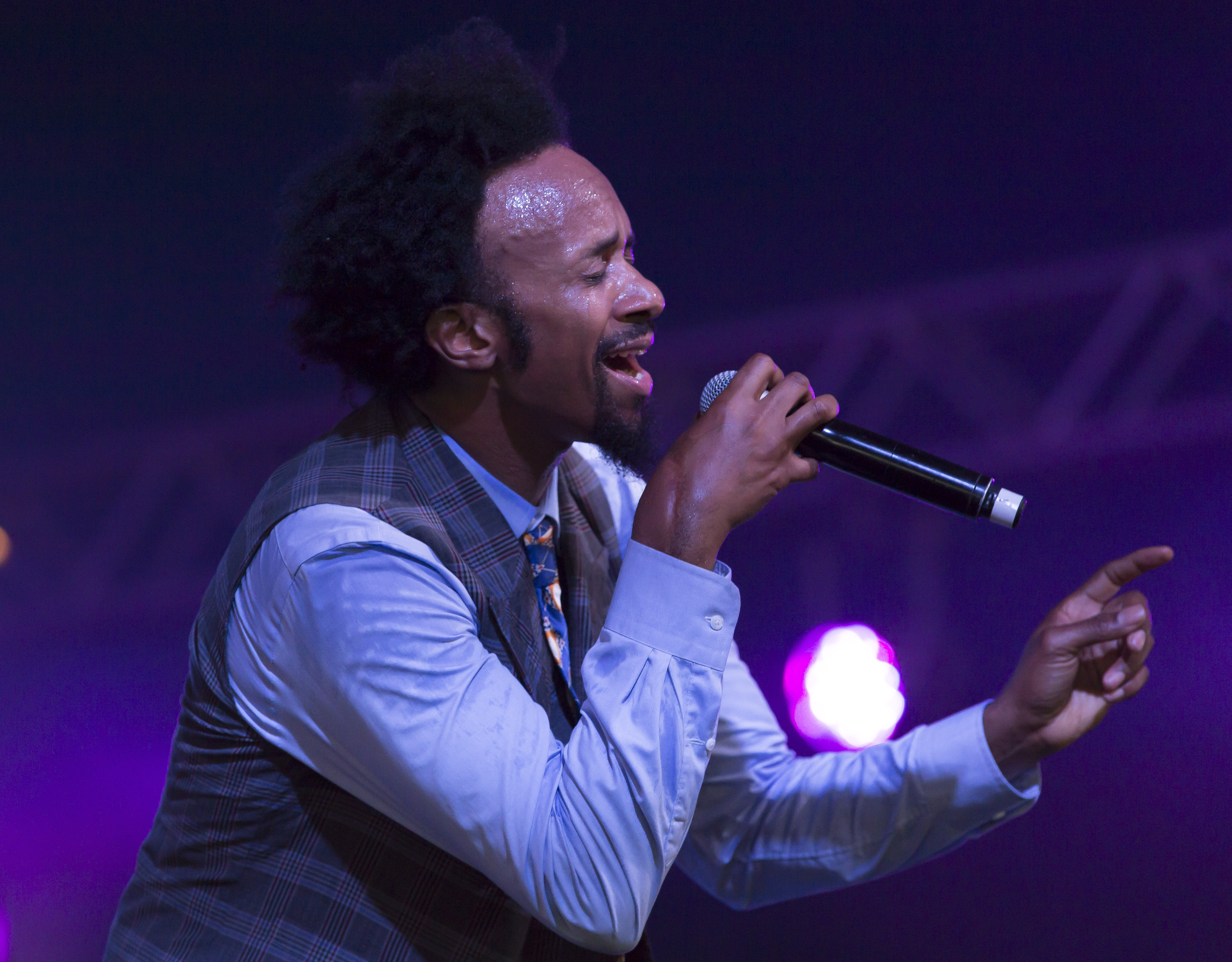
Three-time winner Fantastic Negrito.

=== 1980s ===
Year	Work	Artist
1988
1988	Strong Persuader	The Robert Cray Band
1988	After All	Bobby "Blue" Bland
1988	Glazed	Earl King
1988	On a Night Like This	Buckwheat Zydeco
1988	"Standing on the Edge of Love"	B. B. King
1989
1989	Don't Be Afraid of the Dark	The Robert Cray Band
1989	Blues You Can Use	Bobby "Blue" Bland
1989	"Low Commotion"	Ry Cooder
1989	Seven Year Itch	Etta James
1989	Talk to Your Daughter	Robben Ford

=== 1990s ===
Year	Work	Artist
1990
1990	In Step	Stevie Ray Vaughan and Double Trouble
1990	King of the Blues: 1989	B. B. King
1990	Live from Austin	Delbert McClinton
1990	Midnight Run	Bobby "Blue" Bland
1990	"Wang Dang Doodle"	Koko Taylor
1991
1991	Family Style	Jimmie Vaughan and Stevie Ray Vaughan
1991	Jump for Joy	Koko Taylor
1991	Midnight Stroll	The Robert Cray Band featuring the Memphis Horns
1991	"Red Hot & Blue"	B. B. King and Lee Atwater
1991	Stickin' to My Guns	Etta James
1992
1992	Damn Right, I've Got the Blues	Buddy Guy
1992	Iceman	Albert Collins
1992	Let Me In	Johnny Winter
1992	Live! Simply the Best	Irma Thomas
1992	Signature	Charlie Musselwhite
1993
1993	The Sky Is Crying	Stevie Ray Vaughan and Double Trouble
1993	I Was Warned	The Robert Cray Band
1993	Peace to the Neighborhood	Pops Staples
1993	Robben Ford and the Blue Line	Robben Ford and the Blue Line
1993	The Right Time	Etta James
1994
1994	Feels Like Rain	Buddy Guy
1994	Hey, Where's Your Brother?	Johnny Winter
1994	Muddy Water Blues: A Tribute to Muddy Waters	Paul Rodgers
1994	Mystic Mile	Robben Ford and the Blue Line
1994	Wake Up Call	John Mayall
1995
1995	Father Father	Pops Staples
1995	Bow Wow	Johnny "Guitar" Watson
1995	Force of Nature	Koko Taylor
1995	Shame + A Sin	The Robert Cray Band
1995	Strange Pleasure	Jimmie Vaughan
1996
1996	Slippin' In	Buddy Guy
1996	Blue Night	Percy Sledge
1996	Live '92-'93	Albert Collins and the Icebreakers
1996	The Man	Clarence "Gatemouth" Brown
1996	Some Rainy Morning	The Robert Cray Band
1997
1997	Just Like You	Keb' Mo'
1997	Live! The Real Deal	Buddy Guy with G. E. Smith and the Saturday Night Live Band
1997	Long Way Home	Clarence "Gatemouth" Brown
1997	A Man Amongst Men	Bo Diddley
1997	Phantom Blues	Taj Mahal
1997	Sad Street	Bobby "Blue" Bland
1998
1998	Señor Blues	Taj Mahal
1998	Come On Home	Boz Scaggs
1998	Reckless	Luther Allison
1998	Sweet Potato Pie	The Robert Cray Band
1998	Trippin' Live	Dr. John
1999
1999	Slow Down	Keb' Mo'
1999	Deuces Wild	B. B. King
1999	Heavy Love	Buddy Guy
1999	Life, Love & the Blues	Etta James
1999	Sing It!	Marcia Ball, Irma Thomas and Tracy Nelson

=== 2000s ===
Year	Work	Artist
2000
2000	Take Your Shoes Off	The Robert Cray Band
2000	Continental Drifter	Charlie Musselwhite
2000	Live in Chicago	Luther Allison
2000	Wander This World	Jonny Lang
2000	Welcome to Little Milton	Little Milton
2001
2001	Shoutin' in Key	Taj Mahal and the Phantom Blues Band
2001	Hoochie Man	Bobby Rush
2001	Royal Blue	Koko Taylor
2001	Shake Hands with Shorty	North Mississippi Allstars
2001	Wicked	Shemekia Copeland
2002
2002	Nothing Personal	Delbert McClinton
2002	Creole Moon	Dr. John
2002	The Door	Keb' Mo'
2002	Matriarch of the Blues	Etta James
2002	Sweet Tea	Buddy Guy
2003
2003	Don't Give Up on Me	Solomon Burke
2003	51 Phantom	North Mississippi Allstars
2003	Burnin' Down the House	Etta James and The Roots Band
2003	One Night in America	Charlie Musselwhite
2003	Room to Breathe	Delbert McClinton
2004
2004	Let's Roll	Etta James
2004	Rediscovered	Howard Tate
2004	The Road We're On	Sonny Landreth
2004	So Many Rivers	Marcia Ball
2004	Wait for Me	Susan Tedeschi
2005
2005	Keep It Simple	Keb' Mo'
2005	I'm a Bluesman	Johnny Winter
2005	N'Awlinz Dis Dat or d'Udda	Dr. John
2005	Sanctuary	Charlie Musselwhite
2005	What's Wrong with This Picture?	Van Morrison
2006
2006	Cost of Living	Delbert McClinton
2006	Bring 'Em In	Buddy Guy
2006	Electric Blue Watermelon	North Mississippi Allstars
2006	Make Do with What You Got	Solomon Burke
2006	Twenty	The Robert Cray Band
2007
2007	After the Rain	Irma Thomas
2007	Hope and Desire	Susan Tedeschi
2007	Live from Across the Pond	The Robert Cray Band
2007	Sippiana Hericane	Dr. John and the Lower 911
2007	Suitcase	Keb' Mo'
2008
2008	The Road to Escondido	J. J. Cale and Eric Clapton
2008	Into the Blues	Joan Armatrading
2008	Is It News	Doyle Bramhall
2008	The Scene of the Crime	Bettye LaVette
2008	Truth	Robben Ford
2009
2009	City That Care Forgot	Dr. John and the Lower 911
2009	Like a Fire	Solomon Burke
2009	Maestro	Taj Mahal
2009	Peace, Love & BBQ	Marcia Ball
2009	Simply Grand	Irma Thomas

=== 2010s ===
Year	Work	Artist
2010
2010	Already Free	The Derek Trucks Band
2010	Back to the River	Susan Tedeschi
2010	Live: Hope at the Hideout	Mavis Staples
2010	This Time	The Robert Cray Band
2010	The Truth According to Ruthie Foster	Ruthie Foster
2011
2011	Living Proof	Buddy Guy
2011	Interpretations: The British Rock Songbook	Bettye LaVette
2011	Live! in Chicago	Kenny Wayne Shepherd Band featuring Hubert Sumlin, Willie "Big Eyes" Smith, Bryan Lee and Buddy Flett
2011	Nothing's Impossible	Solomon Burke
2011	Tribal	Dr. John and the Lower 911
2017
2017	The Last Days of Oakland	Fantastic Negrito
2017	Bloodline	Kenny Neal
2017	Everybody Wants a Piece	Joe Louis Walker
2017	Give It Back to You	The Record Company
2017	Love Wins Again	Janiva Magness
2018
2018	TajMo	Taj Mahal and Keb' Mo'
2018	Got Soul	Robert Randolph and the Family Band
2018	Live from the Fox Oakland	Tedeschi Trucks Band
2018	Recorded Live in Lafayette	Sonny Landreth
2018	Robert Cray & Hi Rhythm	Robert Cray and Hi Rhythm
2019
2019	Please Don't Be Dead	Fantastic Negrito
2019	Cry No More	Danielle Nicole
2019	Here in Babylon	Teresa James and the Rhythm Tramps
2019	Out of the Blues	Boz Scaggs
2019	Victor Wainwright and the Train	Victor Wainwright and the Train

=== 2020s ===
Year	Work	Artist
2020
2020	This Land	Gary Clark Jr.
2020	Brighter Days	Robert Randolph and the Family Band
2020	Keep On	Southern Avenue
2020	Somebody Save Me	Sugaray Rayford
2020	Venom & Faith	Larkin Poe
2021
2021	Have You Lost Your Mind Yet?	Fantastic Negrito
2021	Blackbirds	Bettye LaVette
2021	The Juice	G. Love
2021	Live at the Paramount	Ruthie Foster Big Band
2021	Up and Rolling	North Mississippi Allstars
2022
2022	662	Christone "Kingfish" Ingram
2022	Delta Kream	The Black Keys featuring Eric Deaton and Kenny Brown
2022	Fire It Up	Steve Cropper
2022	Royal Tea	Joe Bonamassa
2022	Uncivil War	Shemekia Copeland
2023
2023	Brother Johnny	Edgar Winter
2023	Bloodline Maintenance	Ben Harper
2023	Crown	Eric Gales
2023	Done Come Too Far	Shemekia Copeland
2023	Set Sail	North Mississippi Allstars
2024
2024	Blood Harmony	Larkin Poe
2024	Death Wish Blues	Samantha Fish and Jesse Dayton
2024	Healing Time	Ruthie Foster
2024	LaVette!	Bettye LaVette
2024	Live in London	Christone "Kingfish" Ingram
2025
2025	Mileage	Ruthie Foster
2025	Blame It on Eve	Shemekia Copeland
2025	Blues Deluxe Vol. 2	Joe Bonamassa
2025	Friendlytown	Steve Cropper and the Midnight Hour
2025	The Fury	Antonio Vergara
2026
2026	Preacher Kids	Robert Randolph
2026	Breakthrough	Joe Bonamassa
2026	Family	Southern Avenue
2026	Paper Doll	Samantha Fish
2026	A Tribute to LJK	Eric Gales
2027
2027	Alive!	Fantastic Negrito
2027	The Breakdown	Keb' Mo'
2027	Hard Road	Christone "Kingfish" Ingram
2027	Just Say Yes	Ruthie Foster
2027	Paper Doll Live	Samantha Fish

== Artists with multiple wins ==
4 wins

- Buddy Guy
- Keb' Mo'

3 wins

- The Robert Cray Band
- Fantastic Negrito
- Taj Mahal
- Stevie Ray Vaughan

2 wins

- Delbert McClinton

== Artists with multiple nominations ==
12 nominations

- Robert Cray

8 nominations

- Buddy Guy

7 nominations

- Etta James
- Keb' Mo'

6 nominations

- Dr. John
- Ruthie Foster

5 nominations

- North Mississippi Allstars

4 nominations

- Bobby "Blue" Bland
- Solomon Burke
- Shemekia Copeland
- Fantastic Negrito
- Robben Ford
- B. B. King
- Bettye LaVette
- Delbert McClinton
- Charlie Musselwhite
- Koko Taylor
- Irma Thomas
- Jimmie Vaughan

3 nominations

- Marcia Ball
- Joe Bonamassa
- Steve Cropper
- Samantha Fish
- Christone "Kingfish" Ingram
- Robert Randolph
- Susan Tedeschi
- Johnny Winter

2 nominations

- Luther Allison
- Clarence "Gatemouth" Brown
- Albert Collins
- Eric Gales
- Sonny Landreth
- Larkin Poe
- Boz Scaggs
- Southern Avenue
- Pops Staples
