= The Memphis Horns =

American horn section

- Origin: United States
- Genres: Soul, blues, rock, horn section
- Label: Stax
- Past members: Wayne Jackson; Andrew Love

The Memphis Horns was an American horn section, made famous by their many appearances on Stax Records. The duo consisted of Wayne Jackson on trumpet and Andrew Love on tenor saxophone. An "offshoot of the Mar-Keys", they continued to work together for over 30 years. They lent their sound to 83 gold and platinum awards and over one hundred high-charting records, including Otis Redding's "(Sittin' On) The Dock of the Bay", Al Green's "Let's Stay Together", and Elvis Presley's "Suspicious Minds".

== Career ==
=== Formation ===
Before the formation of the Memphis Horns, the co-founders worked in other projects. Jackson, while in high school, was a member of the Mar-Keys, a group that would become part of the house band for Stax Records during the 1960s. Meanwhile, Love was playing the saxophone in his father's church, and his school bands. He joined the house band in 1965, after completing his post secondary education in music. Upon Love's entry, the two met formally and clicked quickly, as they had heard, and heard of, each other in clubs before.

In addition to recording at Stax, the duo were also working sessions at Royal Studio and American Sound Studio in Memphis, at Atlantic Records in New York, and at FAME Studio in Muscle Shoals. In 1969, after being asked to work exclusively at Stax, Jackson and Love declined and incorporated as The Memphis Horns to continue offering their signature sound to all who needed it.

=== Recording history ===
The Memphis Horns appeared on nearly every recording for Stax that included a horn section — with Isaac Hayes, Otis Redding, Rufus Thomas, Sam and Dave and others — as well as on other releases, including The Doobie Brothers' What Were Once Vices Are Now Habits and U2's Rattle and Hum, as well as a few solo records.

In the 1970s, they recorded with Al Green, Aretha Franklin, Rod Stewart, James Taylor, Joe Tex, Neil Diamond, Mike Harrison, Don Harrison Band, and Stephen Stills. They toured with Stills in 1971 and The Doobie Brothers from 1973 to 1976. In the 1980s, they recorded with Jimmy Buffett, Willie Nelson, Hank Williams, Steve Winwood, Robert Cray and many others. They toured with Jimmy Buffett for three years and one year with Joe Cocker. In the late 1980s and 1990s, Jackson and Love worked extensively with the blues outfit, The Robert Cray Band. They provided their trademark funky/soul horns backing to five of the band's albums: Strong Persuader (1986); Don't Be Afraid of the Dark (1988); Midnight Stroll (1990); I Was Warned (1992); Sweet Potato Pie (1997).

In 1992, they released their own album Flame Out, produced by fellow Stax alumnus Terry Manning.

Following the retirement of Love in 2004, Jackson recruited Tom McGinley, a baritone sax player, to continue to record on projects such as Neil Young's Prairie Wind (2005).

In 2007, Jackson reunited with former longtime member Jack Hale, also including McGinley, in order to join a supergroup backing singer-songwriter Andrew Jon Thomson, on his "All Star Superband" multi-album project. In 2008, this line-up played on some songs on the Raconteurs record, Consolers of the Lonely. The same year the Memphis Horns recorded with Jack White (White Stripes, the Raconteurs) and Alicia Keys on the song "Another Way to Die", for the 22nd James Bond movie, Quantum of Solace.

=== Legacy and awards ===
In 2008, the Memphis Horns were inducted into the Musicians Hall of Fame and Museum in Nashville, TN. In 2012, the Memphis Horns received a Grammy Lifetime Achievement Award for outstanding artistic significance in music, and in 2017, the duo was inducted into the Memphis Music Hall of Fame.

== Discography ==
=== Studio albums ===
- The Memphis Horns (1970)
- Horns for Everything (1972)
- High On Music (1976)
- Get Up and Dance (1977)
- The Memphis Horns Band II (1978)
- Welcome to Memphis (1979)
- Flame Out (1992)
- The Memphis Horns with Special Guests (1995)
- Wishing You a Merry Christmas (1996)

=== Selected list of albums on which the Memphis Horns appeared ===
- What Were Once Vices Are Now Habits (1974) – The Doobie Brothers
- Takin' It to the Streets (1976) – The Doobie Brothers
- Hi (1979) – Elizabeth Barraclough
- So (1986) – Peter Gabriel
- Strong Persuader (1986) – Robert Cray
- Don't Be Afraid of the Dark (1988) – Robert Cray
- The Swamp Boogie Queen (1988) – Katie Webster
- Rattle and Hum (1988) – U2
- Roll with It (1988) – Steve Winwood
- Elio Samaga Hukapan Kariyana Turu (1989) – Elio e le Storie Tese
- Midnight Stroll (1990) – Robert Cray
- I Was Warned (1992) – Robert Cray
- Sweet Potato Pie (1997) – Robert Cray
- Bird Nest on the Ground (2012) – Doyle Bramhall

== List of members ==
- Wayne Jackson – trumpet
- Andrew Love – tenor saxophone
- Floyd Newman – baritone saxophone
- Lewis Collins – saxophone, flute
- Jack Hale – trombone
- Jack Hale, Jr. – trumpet, french horn (born in 1955, in Memphis, Tennessee)
- Ed Logan – tenor saxophone (born Edward Logan, 12 February 1945, in Memphis, Tennessee, died 13 April 2000, in Mobile, Alabama)
- James Mitchell – baritone saxophone (1931–2000, in Ashland, Mississippi)
- Ben Cauley – trumpet
- Roger Hopps – trumpet
- Joe Arnold – saxophone
- Calvin Caples – baritone saxophone
- Packy Axton – saxophone

== Selected recordings ==
=== 1965 ===
| Artist | Song title | Date | US charts | R&B charts | UK charts | Notes |
| Wilson Pickett | "In the Midnight Hour" | May 12, 1965 | 21 | 1 | 12 | date is date recorded |
| Wilson Pickett | "634-5789 (Soulsville, U.S.A.)" | December 20, 1965 | 13 | 1 | 36 | date is date recorded |

=== 1966 ===
| Artist | Song title | Date | US charts | R&B charts | UK charts | Notes |
| Wilson Pickett | "Land of a Thousand Dances" | May 8–11, 1966 | 6 | 1 | 22 | date is date recorded |
| Wilson Pickett | "Mustang Sally" | October 13, 1966 | 23 | 6 | 28 | date is date recorded |
