= Get Up & Dance =

Get Up & Dance or Get Up and Dance may refer to:

- Get Up & Dance (Gina G album)
- Get Up & Dance (The Memphis Horns album)
- A song on Full Circle (The Doors album)
- Get Up and Dance, a dance video game
