= Bad Influence (album) =

Studio album by the Robert Cray Band
- Released: 1983
- Genre: Soul blues
- Length: 41:57
- Label: Hightone
- Producers: Bruce Bromberg, Dennis Walker

The Robert Cray Band chronology
Who's Been Talkin' (1980)	Bad Influence (1983)	False Accusations (1985)

Professional ratings
Review scores
Source	Rating
AllMusic	5/5 stars
The Encyclopedia of Popular Music	4/5 stars
The Penguin Guide to Blues Recordings	3/4 stars
The Village Voice	B+

Bad Influence is the second studio album by the blues singer-songwriter and guitarist Robert Cray.

Released with Hightone Records, this was the album thought to have put Cray on the map, prior to his explosion into the mainstream with Strong Persuader in 1986. It was his second release and his first on Hightone Records. It contained two cover versions: Johnny Guitar Watson's "Don't Touch Me" and Eddie Floyd's "Got to Make a Comeback". The most well-known songs off the album are probably the funky minor-key blues song "Phone Booth", later covered by Cray's idol Albert King, and the title track which was subsequently covered by Eric Clapton. Bruce Bromberg and Dennis Walker produced the album for the California-based label. To date the album has sold over one million copies.

== Track listing ==
1. "Phone Booth" (Robert Cray, Richard Cousins, Dennis Walker, Mike Vannice) (3:32)
2. "Bad Influence" (Cray, Mike Vannice) (2:56)
3. "Grinder" (Cray, David Amy) (4:09)
4. " Got To Make a Comeback" (Eddie Floyd, Joe Shamwell) (2:50)
5. "So Many Women, So Little Time" (Oscar Washington, David Amy, N.T. Clemens) (4:01)
6. "Where Do I Go from Here" (Cray, Mike Vannice, Dennis Walker) (4:03)
7. "Waiting for the Tide to Turn" (Cray, Mike Vannice, Dennis Walker) (3:31)
8. "March On'" (Cray) (2:25)
9. "Don't Touch Me" (Johnny "Guitar" Watson, Shawn Dewey) (3:25)
10. "No Big Deal" (Cray, David Amy) (4:14)

Bonus Tracks

11. "I Got Loaded" (Robert Camille) (3:37)
12. "Share What You've Got, Keep What You Need" (Booker T. Jones, Steve Cropper) (3:50)

== Personnel ==
- Robert Cray – vocals, guitar
- Richard Cousins – bass
- David Olson – drums
- Mike Vannice – keyboards, tenor saxophone
- Warren Rand – alto saxophone
- David Li – percussion on "No Big Deal"
- "Night Train" Clemens, Philip Walker, Tony Mathews – backing vocals on "So Many Women, So Little Time"
