= False Accusations =

Studio album by the Robert Cray Band
- Released: 1985
- Studio: Sage & Sound, Music Lab & Haywoods, Los Angeles
- Genre: Blues
- Length: 38:23
- Label: Hightone
- Producer: Bruce Bromberg, Dennis Walker

The Robert Cray Band chronology
Bad Influence (1983)	False Accusations (1985)	Showdown! (1985)

False Accusations is the third studio album by the Robert Cray Band, released 1985.

In the same year, Cray won the W.C. Handy Award for best male artist of 1985.

== Commercial reception ==
In the United States, the album became his first release to enter the Billboard 200, peaking at number 141. In the United Kingdom, it reached number 68 on the UK Albums Chart dated October 12, 1985, marking his first album to enter the UK Top 100, although it fell out of the Top 100 the following week.

In the Netherlands, the album debuted at number 26 on the albums chart dated April 12, 1986, rose to a peak of number 25 the following week, and remained in the Top 100 for a total of 12 weeks. In New Zealand, it entered the Top 50 for four consecutive weeks starting on June 1, 1986, peaking at number 36 at the time. It later re-entered the Top 50 on August 9, 1987, reaching a new peak of number 17 on the chart dated August 23.

== Critical reception ==
Professional ratings
Review scores
Source	Rating
AllMusic	3/5 stars
The Encyclopedia of Popular Music	3/5 stars
The Penguin Guide to Blues Recordings	3.5/4 stars
Rolling Stone	Favorable
The Village Voice	A−

The Boston Globe listed the album among the best of 1985, writing that Cray "melds soul-style vocals with masterful blues guitar." Robert Christgau commented that while Clay's vocals are powerful and unadorned and his guitar playing is economical, his success as a major artist with this old-fashioned style was due to the strength of the material, particularly the tasteful songs provided by the producers.

Bill Dahl, writing for AllMusic, described it as "not overwhelming, but a solid album."

== Track listing ==
1. "Porch Light" (Dennis Walker) – 5:01
2. "Change of Heart, Change of Mind (S.O.F.T)" (Cray, Richard Cousins) – 3:49
3. "She's Gone" (David Amy, Cray, Ozall Washington, Peter Boe) – 2:50
4. "Playin' in the Dirt" (David Amy, Cray) – 3:46
5. "I've Slipped Her Mind" (Dennis Walker) – 5:15
6. "False Accusations" (Dennis Walker, Cray, Richard Cousins) – 3:55
7. "The Last Time (I Get Burned Like This)" (Cray) – 3:50
8. "Payin' for It Now" (David Amy, Cray) – 4:38
9. "Sonny" (David Amy, Dennis Walker) – 4:48

== Personnel ==
The Robert Cray Band

- Robert Cray – guitar, vocals
- Richard Cousins – bass
- David Olson – drums
- Peter Boe – keyboards

Horn section

- David Li – horn arrangement, tenor saxophone, percussion on "Porch Light"
- Nolan Smith – trumpet

Additional musicians

- Dave Wilson – second guitar on "Sonny"
- Dennis Walker – second bass on "Sonny"

== Certifications and sales ==
Certifications and sales for False Accusations
Region	Certification	Certified units/sales
New Zealand (RMNZ)	Gold	7,500^{^}
United Kingdom (BPI)	Silver	60,000^{^}
United States	—	350,000
^{^} Shipments figures based on certification alone.
