= Who's Been Talkin' =

Studio album by the Robert Cray Band
- Released: 1980
- Genre: Blues
- Label: Tomato
- Producers: Bruce Bromberg, Dennis Walker

The Robert Cray Band chronology
Who's Been Talkin' (1980)	Bad Influence (1983)

Who's Been Talkin' is the first album by the Robert Cray Band, released in 1980. It received little initial notice due to Tomato Records' bankruptcy. It has been rereleased a couple of times, including under the title Too Many Cooks.

== Production ==
Produced by Bruce Bromberg and Dennis Walker, the album was recorded in two sessions. Cray wrote four of its songs. "Too Many Cooks" is a cover of the Willie Dixon song.

== Critical reception ==
Professional ratings
Review scores
Source	Rating
AllMusic	4/5 stars
Robert Christgau	B
The Encyclopedia of Popular Music	3/5 stars
MusicHound Rock: The Essential Album Guide	3/5 stars
The Penguin Guide to Blues Recordings	3/4 stars
Q	4/5 stars
The Rolling Stone Album Guide	3/5 stars

Robert Christgau wrote: "Cray can recite his catechism without kowtowing to orthodoxy--guitar like Albert Collins only chillier and more staccato, voice like B.B. King only cleaner and, well, thinner." The New York Times, in a review praising the artistic growth of Cray's Strong Persuader, from 1986, thought that his first three albums "variously recalled the Stax/Volt and Atlantic soul sounds, big-city funk, and bar band rock-and-roll."

The Globe and Mail commended "the winning confidence, the cool reserve, the sense of pure style and the respectful curiosity about the blues tradition." The Toronto Star thought that "even as a young and impressionable guitarist, Cray had amazing strength and versatility, and no appreciation of his work would be complete without this excellent album."

The Rough Guide to Rock called the album "raw and teeming with promise."

== Track listing ==
No.	Title	Length
1.	"Too Many Cooks (by Willie Dixon)"	2:49
2.	"The Score"	4:06
3.	"The Welfare (Turns Its Back on You) (by Lucious Weaver, Sonny Thompson)"	3:19
4.	"That's What I'll Do"	2:37
5.	"I'd Rather Be a Wino"	4:49
6.	"Who's Been Talkin' (by Chester Burnett)"	3:45
7.	"Sleeping in the Ground (by Sam Myers)"	3:19
8.	"I'm Gonna Forget About You (by O.V. Wright)"	3:10
9.	"Nice as a Fool Can Be"	3:14
10.	"If You're Thinkin' What I'm Thinkin'"	4:26

== Personnel ==
- Robert Cray – guitar, vocals
- Richard Cousins – bass
- Dave Olson – drums
- Buster B. Jones – drums
- Tom Murphy – drums
- Nathaniel Dove – keyboards
- Curtis Salgado – harmonica, vocals
- Nolan Andrew Smith – trumpet
- David Li – tenor saxophone
- Bruce Bromberg – producer
- Dennis Walker – producer, bass
- Dave Crawford – engineer
- Bill Dashiell – engineer
