= Preacher Kids =

Studio album by Robert Randolph
- Released: June 27, 2025
- Genre: Blues
- Length: 56:03
- Label: Sun
- Producer: Shooter Jennings

Robert Randolph chronology
| Brighter Days (2019) | Preacher Kids (2025) |

Preacher Kids is an album by Robert Randolph. It was released on June 27, 2025. In 2026, it won a Grammy Award for Best Contemporary Blues Album.

== Critical reception ==
On AllMusic, Mark Deming said, "[Producer Shooter Jennings] gets an admirably powerful sound from Randolph and his studio crew... as well as letting bassist Jay White and drummer Willie Barthel put down some potent grooves. On Preacher Kids, Robert Randolph gives himself the chance to cut loose and get gone for a change, and it sounds and feels really good."

In Blues Rock Review, Lee Clark wrote, "The record comes in at just under 47 minutes of absolute perfection... Robert Randolph is a well-known pedal steel legend across multiple genres with multiple Grammy nominations, having worked with some of the biggest names in modern music, and with this new album, he's trying something a little different. The result is a blues rocker's dream."

In Spill Magazine, Gerrod Harris said, "Truthfully, there is not a moment of weakness across Preacher Kids, guaranteeing heavy rotation on repeat as the album of the summer..... Preacher Kids is a revelation. Over the course of ten songs, Randolph delivers a revitalising take on both the blues and the pedal steel for our modern age."

In 2026, the album won a Grammy Award for Best Contemporary Blues Album.

== Track listing ==
1. "Big Women" (Robert Randolph, Judith Hill) – 5:00
2. "7 Generations" (Robert Randolph, Stephen Kellogg) – 5:56
3. "Gravity" (Robert Randolph) – 4:53
4. "I'd Like to Love You Baby" (JJ Cale) – 3:40
5. "Choir Woman" (Robert Randolph, Judith Hill) – 3:51
6. "Sinner" (Robert Randolph, Aaron Raitiere) – 4:13
7. "King Karma" – featuring Margo Price (Robert Randolph, JT Nero) – 3:46
8. "When Will the Love Rain Down" – featuring Judith Hill (Robert Randolph, Judith Hill) – 5:43
9. "All Night Lover" (Robert Randolph, Sam Hollander) – 4:35
10. "Roosevelt Pool" (Robert Randolph) – 4:34

== Personnel ==
Musicians

- Robert Randolph – pedal steel guitar, vocals
- Tash Neal – guitar
- Jay White – bass
- Willie Barthell – drums

Production

- Produced by Shooter Jennings
- Mastered by Pete Lyman
- Mixed by David Spreng
- Assisted by Daniel Bacigalupi
- Photography and design by Julian Gross
