= Steve Jordan (drummer) =

American drummer and music producer (b. 1957)

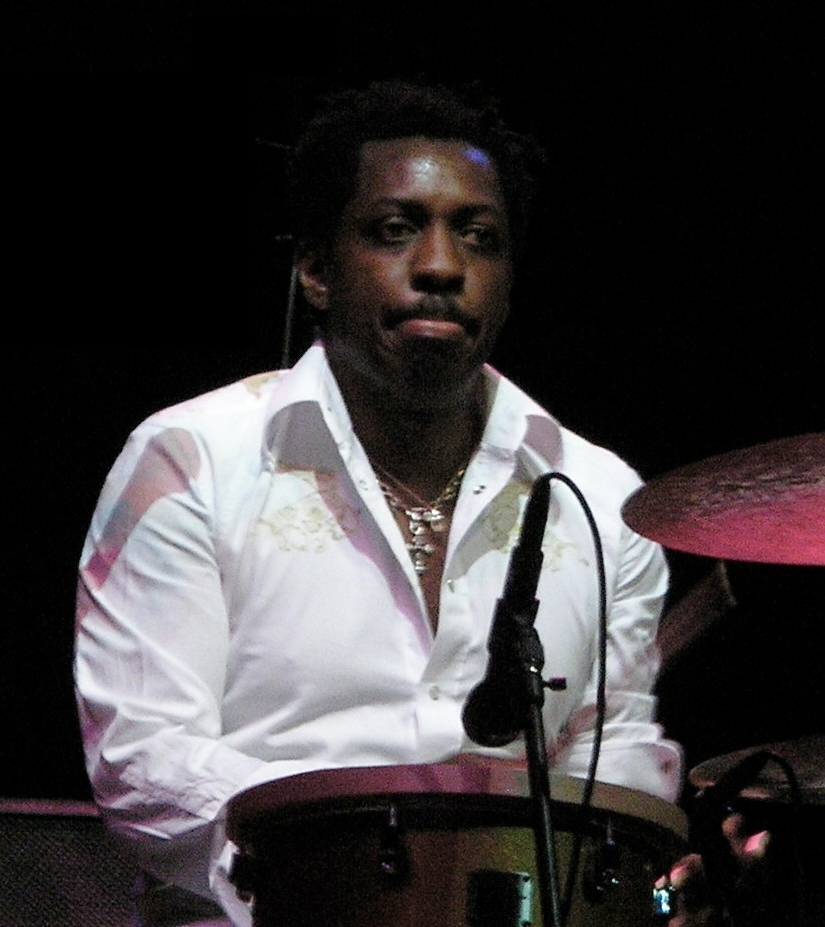
- Jordan in 2006

Background information
- Born: January 14, 1957 (age 69); New York City, U.S.
- Genres: Rock; pop; R&B
- Occupations: Musician; producer
- Instruments: Drums; percussion
- Years active: 1978–present
- Labels: Virgin; JVC Victor
- Member of: The Rolling Stones
- Formerly of: Saturday Night Live Band; the Blues Brothers; Paul Shaffer and the World's Most Dangerous Band; Keith Richards/X-pensive Winos; John Mayer Trio

Steve Jordan (born January 14, 1957) is an American drummer and music producer. Currently, he is the drummer for the Rolling Stones. During the 1970s and 1980s, he was a member of the bands for the television shows Saturday Night Live and Late Night with David Letterman.

In the early 1980s, Jordan was a member of the band Eyewitness, along with bandleader Steve Khan on guitar, Anthony Jackson on bass, and Manolo Badrena on percussion. Since the mid-1980s, Jordan has also been a member of the X-Pensive Winos, the side project of the Rolling Stones guitarist Keith Richards. Jordan and Richards have been production and songwriting partners on many of Richards's solo works. In 2005, he became a member of the John Mayer Trio. Jordan also formed the band the Verbs, which he fronts, with his wife Meegan Voss. On August 5, 2021, it was reported that Charlie Watts had elected to sit out the resumption of the US No Filter Tour due to a heart procedure surgery and that Jordan would temporarily replace him on drums. Following Watts' death, he has played with the Stones both live and in studio.

== Early life ==
Jordan attended New York City's High School of Music and Art, graduating in 1974.

Jordan was a teenager when he became an honorary member of Stevie Wonder's band WonderLove. He also was a substitute drummer in the band Stuff in 1976 and played with Joe Cocker on his American tour. Later, he played drums for the Saturday Night Live band in the 1970s. When John Belushi and Dan Aykroyd toured as the Blues Brothers in the late 1970s, Jordan was their drummer, and recorded on their resulting albums, credited as Steve "Getdwa" Jordan. He did not, however, appear in the film The Blues Brothers. Jordan also played in the New York 24th Street Band with Will Lee, Clifford Carter, and Hiram Bullock, which later became Paul Shaffer and the World's Most Dangerous Band, which played on Late Night with David Letterman from 1982 to 1986.

== Career ==
=== X-Pensive Winos and Chuck Berry ===
Jordan, along with fellow Shaffer alumnus Anton Fig, appeared on the Rolling Stones' 1986 release Dirty Work, playing percussion, not drums, contrary to rumors. Keith Richards then hired Jordan to play on Aretha Franklin's cover of "Jumpin' Jack Flash" for a film of the same name.

According to Richards, Jordan kept asking Richards on the plane ride home from the recording session with Franklin in Detroit, to be included in the upcoming documentary by Taylor Hackford Hail! Hail! Rock 'n' Roll, a tribute to Chuck Berry. Richards had been hoping to include Charlie Watts in the project but when that proved unfeasible, Jordan was hired and he appeared in many scenes with Berry and Richards. The success of that project led to Jordan's membership in Keith Richards and the X-pensive Winos, a band that toured and recorded three albums, Talk Is Cheap (1988), Main Offender (1992), and Crosseyed Heart (2015). Jordan co-produced all three albums and is credited with songwriting, along with Richards. One of those collaborations made it onto the Billboard Hot 100 via the Rolling Stones Steel Wheels album version in 1989: "Almost Hear You Sigh" peaked at number 50 (U.S.) and 31 (U.K.) in December of that year.

=== The Verbs ===
Jordan formed a band with his wife, Meegan Voss, who fronted the all-girl punk bands the PopTarts and the Antoinettes, and they have toured and recorded under the band name the Verbs. They toured Japan in 2007 in support of their first release, And Now... The Verbs. They followed their debut album with Trip, the next release by Jordan and Voss. As in their previous release, this album features Tamio Okuda on lead guitars, Pino Palladino on bass and additional classic guitar work by Danny "Kootch" Kortchmar.

=== Producing and performance career ===
Jordan has recorded with such artists as Don Henley, John Mellencamp, Andrés Calamaro, Cat Stevens, Bob Dylan, Sonny Rollins, B.B. King, Stevie Nicks, Sheryl Crow, Neil Young, Donald Fagen, Jon Spencer Blues Explosion, Kelly Clarkson, and many more. He is featured on James Taylor's 1998 DVD, Live at the Beacon Theatre.

Jordan is a Grammy Award-winning and nominated producer with Robert Cray's album Take Your Shoes Off and Buddy Guy's Bring 'Em In, respectively. He has played on Alicia Keys' "If I Ain't Got You" and Bruce Springsteen's Devils and Dust, and he produced the Grammy Award-winning John Mayer album Continuum (2006), John Scofield's That's What I Say, Possibilities by Herbie Hancock, and 23rd St. Lullaby and Play It As It Lays with Patti Scialfa.

Jordan is interviewed on screen, was a musical director, led the house band and appears in performance footage in the 2005 documentary film Make It Funky!, which presents a history of New Orleans music and its influence on rhythm and blues, rock and roll, funk and jazz.

In 2006, Jordan joined Eric Clapton's touring band for Clapton's "European Tour 2006", which included seven sold-out shows at the Royal Albert Hall. He continued in Clapton's band as they toured North America in 2007.

In 2008, Jordan produced and played percussion on one track for Los Lonely Boys' third album, Forgiven, at East Side Stages in Austin, Texas.

In 2009, Jordan received another Grammy Award nomination - the Grammy Award for Best Compilation Soundtrack Album for a Motion Picture, Television or Other Visual Media, for his work on the soundtrack scoring film for the movie Cadillac Records.

In 2013, Jordan produced the Boz Scaggs album Memphis and played in Eric Clapton's band for Clapton's Crossroads Guitar Festival in 2013.

=== John Mayer Trio ===
Jordan is a member of the John Mayer Trio, a blues rock power trio that consists of Jordan, on drums and backing vocals, bassist Pino Palladino and guitarist-singer John Mayer. The group was formed in 2005 by Mayer as a change from his pop-acoustic career. The trio released the record Try! on November 22, 2005. The 11-track live album includes cover songs, such as Jimi Hendrix's "Wait Until Tomorrow", and "I Got a Woman" by Ray Charles, two songs from Mayer's release Heavier Things, as well as new songs written by Mayer, in addition to three songs written by Jordan, Mayer, and Palladino. They are: "Good Love Is On the Way", "Vultures" and "Try". Jordan and Mayer also produced the album together on the Columbia Records label.

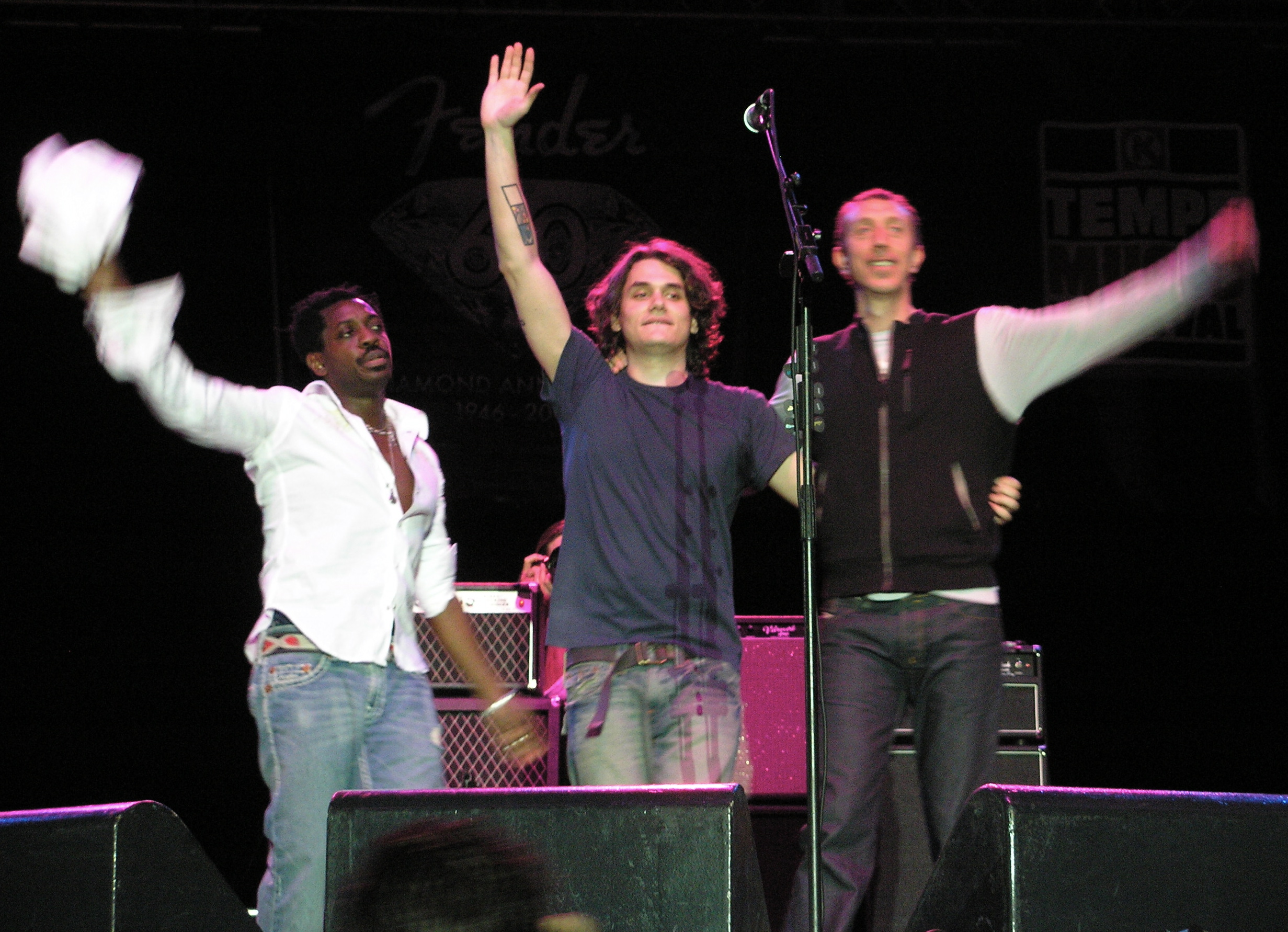
Left to right: Jordan, John Mayer, and Pino Palladino

The trio also performed on December 8, 2007, in Los Angeles, California at the L.A. Live Nokia Theatre for the 1st Annual Holiday Charity Revue, which raised funds for various Los Angeles related charities. The DVD/CD release, entitled Where the Light Is: John Mayer Live in Los Angeles features Palladino on bass and Jordan on drums.

Jordan would later collaborate with Mayer and Charlie Hunter by writing "In Repair", the 11th track from Mayer's 2006 album Continuum. Jordan also contributed to Mayer's fourth album, Battle Studies; videos of the conceptual/recording sessions can be viewed on YouTube.

=== Super Soul Band ===
Jordan also belongs to an all-star funk group, that "is redefining the idea of a supergroup." The band consists of Jordan on the drums, Wayne Cobham, Eddie Allen, Clifton Anderson, and Clark Gayton on the horn section. Willie Weeks on bass, Mix Master Mike, Isaiah Sharkey, and Ray Parker Jr. on guitar.

=== The Rolling Stones ===
On August 5, 2021, it was announced that Jordan would replace Rolling Stones drummer Charlie Watts on the Stones' 13-date US tour. Watts was first sidelined for health problems and died on August 24, 2021, at the age of 80 after a short illness. Keith Richards recounted in his 2010 autobiography that in the 1980s Watts told him that if he ever wanted to work with another drummer, "Steve Jordan's your man." Jordan would subsequently perform on the group's Hackney Diamonds album and its tour.

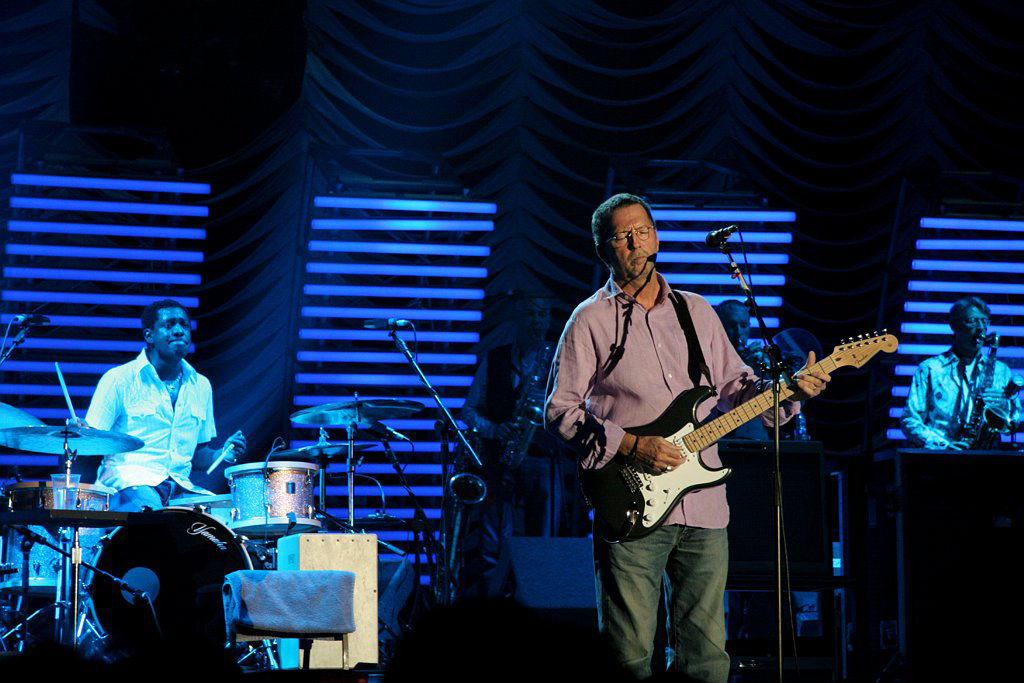
Jordan, left, with drum kit, performing with Eric Clapton during the Crossroads Guitar Festival in 2007

== Discography ==
With The Blues Brothers

- Briefcase Full of Blues, 1978
- Made in America, 1980
- Best of the Blues Brothers, 1981
- Dancin' Wid Da Blues Brothers, 1983
- Everybody Needs the Blues Brothers, 1988
- The Definitive Collection, 1992
- The Very Best of the Blues Brothers, 1995
- The Blues Brothers Complete, 2000
- The Essentials, 2003

=== As sideman ===
With Casey Abrams

- Casey Abrams (Concord, 2012)

With Arcadia

- So Red the Rose (Parlophone, 1985)

With Ashford & Simpson

- Is It Still Good to Ya (Warner Bros., 1978)

With Patti Austin

- Havana Candy (CTI, 1977)

With Aztec Camera

- Love (Sire, 1987)

With Bee Gees

- Still Waters (Polydor Records, 1997)

With George Benson

- In Your Eyes (Warner Bros. Records, 1983)

With Beyoncé

- I Am... Sasha Fierce (Columbia Records, 2008)

With Eric Bibb

- Dear America (Provogue, 2021)

With Booker T. & the M.G.'s

- That's the Way It Should Be (Columbia, 1994)

With Ronnie Baker Brooks

- Times Have Changed (Provogue, 2017)

With Solomon Burke

- Like a Fire (Shout! Factory, 2008)

With Andrés Calamaro

- Alta Suciedad (Gasa, 1997)

With J. J. Cale and Eric Clapton

- The Road to Escondido (Reprise Records, 2006)

With Felix Cavaliere

- Castles in the Air (Epic, 1979)

With Kelly Clarkson

- Stronger (RCA Records, 2011)

With Bootsy Collins

- Tha Funk Capital of the World (Mascot, 2011)
- The Power of the One (Bootzilla, 2020)

With Sean Costello

- Sean Costello (Tone-Cool Records, 2004)

With Cracker

- Gentleman's Blues (Virgin Records, 1998)

With Robert Cray

- Take Your Shoes Off (Rykodisc, 1999)
- Shoulda Been Home (Rykodisc, 2001)
- In My Soul (Provogue, 2014)
- Robert Cray & Hi Rhythm (Warner Bros., 2017)
- That's What I Heard (Nozzle, 2020)

With Steve Cropper

- Dedicated – A Salute to the 5 Royales (429 Records, 2011)

With Sheryl Crow

- C'mon, C'mon (A&M Records, 2002)
- Threads (Big Machine Records, 2019)

With Bob Dylan

- Down in the Groove (Columbia Records, 1988)

With Donald Fagen

- The Nightfly (Warner Bros. Records, 1982)

With Ricky Fanté

- Rewind (Virgin, 2004)

With Roberta Flack

- Roberta (Atlantic Records, 1994)

With The Floaters

- Float Into the Future (MCA Records, 1979)

With Robben Ford

- Tiger Walk (Blue Thumb, 1997)

With Bernard Fowler

- Inside Out (Rhyme & Reason, 2019)

With Aretha Franklin

- Aretha (Arista Records, 1986)

With Michael Franks

- The Camera Never Lies (Warner Bros. Records, 1987)

With Jeffrey Gaines

- Somewhat Slightly Dazed (Chrysalis Records, 1994)

With Debbie Gibson

- Think with Your Heart (EMI, 1995)

With Vince Gill

- Down to My Last Bad Habit (MCA Records, 2016)

With Bunky Green

- Visions (Vanguard, 1978)

With Josh Groban

- Bridges (Reprise Records, 2018)
- Harmony (Reprise Records, 2020)

With Hall & Oates

- Our Kind of Soul (U-Watch Records, 2004)

With Herbie Hancock

- Possibilities (Hear Music, 2005)

With Major Harris

- How Do You Take Your Love (RCA Records, 1978)

With Don Henley

- The End of the Innocence (Geffen, 1989)

With Cissy Houston

- Cissy Houston (Private Stock Records, 1977)
- Face to Face (BMG, 1996)
- He Leadeth Me (A&M Records, 1997)

With Phyllis Hyman

- Phyllis Hyman (Buddah, 1977)

With Garland Jeffreys

- Don't Call Me Buckwheat (BMG, 1991)
- Wildlife Dictionary (RCA Records, 1997)
- The King of In Between (Big Lake, 2011)
- Truth Serum (Luna Park, 2013)

With Billy Joel

- River of Dreams (Columbia Records, 1993)

With Libby Johnson

- Annabella (Wrong Records, 2006)

With Alicia Keys

- The Diary of Alicia Keys (J Records, 2003)
- As I Am (J Records, 2007)
- Keys (RCA Records, 2021)

With Steve Khan Eyewitness

- Eyewitness (Antilles, 1981)
- Modern Times (also released as Blades) (Trio/Passport, 1982)
- Casa Loco (Antilles, 1984)

With B. B. King

- Deuces Wild (MCA Records, 1997)

With K'naan

- Country, God or the Girl (A&M Records, 2012)

With Labelle

- Back to Now (Verve, 2008)

With Cyndi Lauper

- At Last (Epic Records, 2003)

With Bettye LaVette

- Things Have Changed (Verve, 2018)
- Blackbirds (Verve, 2020)
- LaVette! (Jay-Vee, 2023)

With Lori Lieberman

- Letting Go (Millennium Records, 1978)

With Taj Mahal

- Evolution (The Most Recent) (Warner Bros., 1978)

With Ziggy Marley

- Dragonfly (Private Music, 2003)

With Amanda Marshall

- Tuesday's Child (Epic Records, 1999)

With Bruno Mars

- Unorthodox Jukebox (Atlantic Records, 2012)

With John Mayer

- Heavier Things (Columbia, 2003)
- Continuum (Columbia, 2006)
- Battle Studies (Columbia, 2009)
- The Search for Everything (Columbia, 2017)

With John Mayer Trio

- Try! (Columbia, 2005)

With Van McCoy

- My Favorite Fantasy (MCA Records, 1978)

With Melanie

- Phonogenic – Not Just Another Pretty Face (Midsong International, 1978)

With John Mellencamp

- Cuttin' Heads (Columbia Records, 2001)

With Keb' Mo'

- The Door (Epic Records, 2000)
- BLUESAmericana (Kind of Blue Music, 2014)
- Moonlight, Mistletoe & You (Concord Records, 2019)

With Ian Moss

- Soul on West 53rd (Liberation, 2009)

With Ivan Neville

- If My Ancestors Could See Me Now (Polydor Records, 1988)
- Thanks (Iguana Records, 1995)

With The Neville Brothers

- Brother's Keeper (A&M, 1990)

With Stevie Nicks

- Rock a Little (Parlophone Records, 1985)

With Odyssey

- Hollywood Party Tonight (RCA Victor, 1978)

With David Paich

- Forgotten Toys (The Players Club, 2022)

With Sam Phillips

- The Indescribable Wow (Virgin Records, 1988)

With The Pretenders

- Get Close (Real, 1986)

With Don Pullen

- Montreux Concert (Atlantic, 1977)

With Nicole Renée

- Nicole Renée (Atlantic Records, 1998)

With Keith Richards

- Talk Is Cheap (Virgin, 1988)
- Main Offender (Virgin, 1992)
- Crosseyed Heart (Republic, 2015)

With LeAnn Rimes

- Spitfire (Curb Records, 2013)
- One Christmas: Chapter 1 (Iconic Records, 2014)
- Remnants (RCA Records, 2016)

With The Rolling Stones

- Hackney Diamonds (Polydor, 2023)
- Foreign Tongues (Polydor, 2026)

With Mark Ronson

- Uptown Special (Columbia Records, 2015)

With Boz Scaggs

- Dig (Virgin Records, 2001)
- Memphis (429 Records, 2013)
- A Fool to Care (429 Records, 2015)

With Helen Schneider

- Let It Be Now (RCA Records, 1978)

With Patti Scialfa

- 23rd Street Lullaby (Columbia, 2004)
- Play It as It Lays (Columbia, 2007)

With John Scofield

- Who's Who? (Arista, 1979)
- Electric Outlet (Gramavision, 1984)
- That's What I Say: John Scofield Plays the Music of Ray Charles (Verve Records, 2005)

With John Sebastian

- Tar Beach (Shanachie, 1992)

With Brian Setzer

- The Knife Feels Like Justice (EMI, 1986)

With Feargal Sharkey

- Wish (Virgin Records, 1988)

With Bruce Springsteen

- Devils & Dust (Columbia Records, 2005)
- Wrecking Ball (Columbia Records, 2012)

With Candi Staton

- Chance (Warner Bros. Records, 1979)

With Mike Stern

- Upside Downside (Atlantic, 1986)

With Cat Stevens

- Back to Earth (Island Records, 1978)

With Rod Stewart

- Soulbook (J Records, 2009)

With Andrew Strong

- Strong (MCA Records, 1993)

With James Taylor

- New Moon Shine (Columbia Records, 1991)

With Toto

- Fahrenheit (CBS, 1986)

With Bonnie Tyler

- Faster Than the Speed of Night (Columbia Records, 1983)

With Peter Wolf

- Fool's Parade (Mercury, 1998)

With Neil Young

- Landing on Water (Geffen, 1986)

With Steven Van Zandt

- Freedom – No Compromise (EMI, 1987)

== Equipment ==
Jordan plays Gretsch Drums, Paiste cymbals. He endorses Remo drumheads. He has signature drumsticks made by Vic Firth.

Previously, Jordan played Yamaha Drums, which included a 13x6.5 signature snare drum, as well as playing and helping design their Club Custom line of drums.
