= Smoking Gun (song) =

Single by Robert Cray

from the album Strong Persuader
- B-side: "Fantasized"
- Released: 1986
- Recorded: 1986
- Genre: Blues rock
- Length: 4:05
- Label: Mercury
- Songwriters: Robert Cray, Bruce Bromberg, Richard Cousins
- Producers: Dennis Walker, Bruce Bromberg

Robert Cray singles chronology
"Smoking Gun" (1986)	"Right Next Door (Because of Me)" (1987)

"Smoking Gun" is a 1986 song by Robert Cray. It reached No. 2 on the Billboard Album Rock Tracks chart and No. 22 on the Billboard Hot 100. In addition, Cray was nominated for the 1987 MTV Video Music Award for Best New Artist in a Video for this song.

== Lyric Interpretation ==
The lyric 'Smoking Gun' is a reference to strong circumstantial evidence of his lover's infidelity.

Later, the song lyrics flip the meaning to a more literal smoking gun, as evidence of revenge by the betrayed on the betrayer.

The lyrics describe that he doesn't know what he has done, but there are sirens, his heart is racing, and he thinks he should be running, implying a probable revenge murder.

== Background ==
The 'Smoking Gun' metaphor refers to the strongest kind of circumstantial evidence, as opposed to direct evidence. An early use was an equivalent term, 'smoking pistol', in a story about a young Sherlock Holmes, written by Arthur Conan Doyle. The term was famously used to describe evidence during the Watergate investigation. Cray's co-writer, Bruce Bromberg later read about the Watergate investigation, leading him to use the term for the song.

== Critical reception ==
Ed Hogan of AllMusic remarked that the song contained "an arresting, up-tempo groove" which "ushered in the contemporary blues era with its respectful nod to the blues tradition while imparting the genre with an underlying airiness".
