= Take Your Shoes Off =

Studio album by Robert Cray
- Released: April 27, 1999
- Genre: Blues
- Label: Rykodisc
- Producer: Steve Jordan

Robert Cray chronology
Sweet Potato Pie (1997)	Take Your Shoes Off (1999)	Shoulda Been Home (2001)

Professional ratings
Review scores
Source	Rating
AllMusic	4.0/5 stars
The Penguin Guide to Blues Recordings	3.5/4 stars
USA Today	2.5/4 stars

Take Your Shoes Off is a blues album by Robert Cray, winning the Grammy Award for Best Contemporary Blues Album at the 42nd Annual Grammy Awards in 2000. It was released on April 27, 1999, through the Rykodisc label. The album won a Grammy Award not just for Cray, but also for drummer and composer Steve Jordan (who played on the album as well) as producer. Jordan, and his wife, Meegan Voss, also contributed to the album, with a composition they wrote together, entitled "It's All Gone".

== Track listing ==
1. "Love Gone to Waste" (Thomas Bingham, Willie Mitchell) – 4:39
2. "That Wasn't Me" (Cray) – 4:45
3. "All the Way" (Cray, Sue Turner-Cray) – 5:11
4. "There's Nothing Wrong" (Cray) – 4:54
5. "24-7 Man" (Mack Rice, Jon Tiven) – 3:22
6. "Pardon" (Cray) – 5:49
7. "Let Me Know" (Cray) – 4:25
8. "It's All Gone" (Steve Jordan, Meegan Voss) – 5:21
9. "Won't You Give Him (One More Chance)" (Joseph Martin, Winfield Scott) – 3:11
10. "Living Proof" (Jim Pugh) – 5:31
11. "What About Me" (Cray) – 6:47
12. "Tollin' Bells" (Willie Dixon) – 5:57

== Personnel ==
- Robert Cray – vocals, guitar, bajo sexto
- Steve Jordan – guitar, bajo sexto, keyboards, bass, drums, snare drum, percussion, background vocals
- Jo-El Sonnier – accordion
- Jim Horn – tenor saxophone, baritone saxophone
- Bobby Keys, Jim Spake, Doug Moffet – tenor saxophone
- James Mitchell – baritone saxophone
- Scott Thompson – trumpet
- Jack Hale – trombone
- Jim Pugh – keyboards
- Karl Sevareid – bass
- Kevin Hayes – drums
- The Nashelles – background vocals
- The Memphis Horns: Andrew Love – tenor saxophone; Wayne Jackson – trumpet
