= Showdown! =

Studio album by Albert Collins, Robert Cray and Johnny Copeland
- Released: 1985
- Studio: Streeterville, Chicago, Illinois
- Genre: Blues
- Length: 42:56
- Label: Alligator
- Producer: Bruce Iglauer, Dick Shurman, Bruce Bromberg ("The Dream")

Robert Cray albums chronology
False Accusations (1985)	Showdown! (1985)	Strong Persuader (1986)

Showdown! is a collaborative blues album by guitarists Albert Collins, Robert Cray and Johnny Copeland, released in 1985 through Alligator Records. The album is mostly original material, with cover versions of songs like T-Bone Walker's "T-Bone Shuffle", Muddy Waters' "She's into Something" and Ray Charles' "Blackjack". Collins, Cray and Copeland were supported by Johnny B. Gayden and Allen Batts, who at the time were members of Collins' Icebreakers, and Alligator's household artist Casey Jones. In the album's sleeve notes, producers Bruce Iglauer and Dick Shurman wrote that Copeland and Cray were both supported by Collins early in their careers, and how the three musicians often crossed paths since, making this collaborative effort a "thirty years in the making" project. Showdown! was one of Alligator's most successful albums, peaking at #124 on the US charts and selling over 175,000 units worldwide. The album won a Grammy Award for Best Traditional Blues Recording in 1986. It was re-released on CD by Alligator in 2011.

== Critical reception ==
Professional ratings
Review scores
Source	Rating
AllMusic	4/5 stars
Christgau's Record Guide: The '80s	B
The Penguin Guide to Blues Recordings	4/4 stars

In a retrospective review, AllMusic noted that "Cray's delivery of Muddy Waters' rhumba-rocking "She's into Something" was one of the set's many highlights".

== Track listing ==
No.	Title	Writer(s)	Vocals	Length
1.	"T-Bone Shuffle"	T-Bone Walker	Albert Collins	4:54
2.	"The Moon Is Full"	Gwen Collins	A. Collins	4:59
3.	"Lion's Den"	Johnny Copeland	Copeland	3:55
4.	"She's into Something"	Carl Wright	Robert Cray	3:49
5.	"Bring Your Fine Self Home"	Copeland	Copeland	4:30
6.	"Black Cat Bone"	Ivory Lee Semien, Harding Wilson	Copeland	4:54
7.	"The Dream"	Robert Cray, David Amy	Cray	5:28
8.	"Albert's Alley"	Albert Collins	Instrumental	4:01
9.	"Blackjack"	Ray Charles	Collins	6:26
10.	"Something to Remember You By"	Eddie Jones	Collins	5:27

== Personnel ==
- Albert Collins - guitar, harmonica (5), vocals (1, 2, 9, 10)
- Robert Cray - guitar, vocals (4, 7)
- Johnny Copeland - guitar, vocals (3, 5, 6)
- Allen Batts - organ
- Johnny B. Gayden - bass
- Casey Jones - drums
