= Live from Across the Pond =

Live album by Robert Cray
- Released: September 12, 2006
- Recorded: May 2006 Royal Albert Hall, Westminster, London, England (Opening for Eric Clapton)
- Genre: Blues
- Length: 89:07
- Label: Vanguard
- Producer: Robert Cray

Robert Cray chronology
Twenty (2005)	Live from Across the Pond (2006)	Live at the BBC (2008)

Professional ratings
Review scores
Source	Rating
Pop Matters	7/10 stars
allmusic	4/5 stars

Live from Across the Pond is a live blues album by Robert Cray. It was released on September 12, 2006, through Vanguard Records. It is his first live album release.

== Disc one ==
1. "Phone Booth" (Dennis Walker, Mike Vannice, Richard Cousins, Cray) – 4:38
2. "Poor Johnny" (Cray) – 6:22
3. "Our Last Time" (Jimmy Pugh, John Hanes) – 8:23
4. "Right Next Door (Because of Me)" (Dennis Walker) – 6:01
5. "12 Year Old Boy" (Mel London) – 6:27
6. "I Guess I Showed Her" (Dennis Walker) – 4:40
7. "The Things You Do To Me" (Cray) – 7:02

== Disc two ==
1. "I Was Warned" (Cray, Dennis Walker) – 8:36
2. "Twenty" (Cray) – 7:34
3. "Bad Influence" (Cray, Mike Vannice) – 3:58
4. "The One in the Middle" (Jimmy Pugh) – 8:19
5. "Back Door Slam" (Bonnie Hayes, Kevin Hayes) – 5:26
6. "Time Makes Two" (Cray) – 6:18
7. "I'm Walkin'" (Chris Hayes, Kevin Hayes) – 5:23

== Personnel ==
- Robert Cray – Guitar, Vocals
- Jim Pugh – Keyboards
- Karl Sevareid – Bass
- Kevin Hayes – Drums
