= In My Soul (album) =

Studio album by Robert Cray
- Released: March 31, 2014
- Studio: Santa Barbara Sound
- Genre: Blues, soul
- Length: 43:50
- Label: Provogue
- Producer: Steve Jordan

Robert Cray chronology
Nothin but Love (2012)	In My Soul (2014)	Robert Cray & Hi Rhythm (2017)

In My Soul is an album by the American musician Robert Cray, released on March 31, 2014, in the UK and on April 1, 2014, in the US. His second album for Provogue Records, it is credited to the Robert Cray Band. In My Soul peaked at No. 43 on the UK Albums Chart. The band supported the album with North American and United Kingdom tours.

== Production ==
Recorded at Santa Barbara Sound Studios, the album was produced by Steve Jordan. "Your Good Thing Is About to End" is a cover of the Mable John song. Drummer Les Falconer duetted with Cray on the cover of Otis Redding's "Nobody's Fault but Mine". Keyboardist Dover Wineberg had last played with the Robert Cray Band in the 1970s. "Deep in My Soul" is a cover of the song popularized by Bobby "Blue" Bland. "Hip Tight Onions" is an instrumental tribute to Booker T. & the M.G.'s.

== Critical reception ==
Professional ratings
Review scores
Source	Rating
AllMusic	4/5 stars
Kinston Free Press	4/5 stars

The Observer called Cray "a master at work," writing that he "has always straddled the line between blues and soul, his stinging guitar in debt to Hubert Sumlin, his compositions steeped in southern soul." The Kinston Free Press determined that "Cray's tight, economical guitar work is given a tad more growl this time out." The Herald wrote that the album "has an unmistakable sheen of the kind of R&B admired by anyone familiar with the output of the Stax and Chess labels between the 1950s and the early 1970s." The Sydney Morning Herald deemed the album "a sugar-sweet, silky smooth set of Stax-influenced soul, and Chess-drenched blues." The Evansville Courier & Press stated that the album "features plenty of his lightly distorted blues sound, but is a venture into more Memphis-style soul."

== Track listing ==
All tracks are written by Robert Cray except where noted.

In My Soul track listing
No.	Title	Writer(s)	Length
1.	"You Move Me"		4:21
2.	"Nobody's Fault but Mine"	Otis Redding	2:39
3.	"Fine Yesterday"		4:31
4.	"Your Good Thing Is About to End"	David Porter; Isaac Hayes	5:34
5.	"I Guess I'll Never Know"	Jeff Paris; Les Falconer; Rick Whitfield	4:39
6.	"Hold On"	Richard Cousins; Hendrix Ackle	3:56
7.	"What Would You Say"		4:25
8.	"Hip Tight Onions"	Cousins; Ackle	2:16
9.	"You're Everything"		6:05
10.	"Deep in My Soul"	Deadric Malone; Gilbret Caple; Joseph Scott	5:16
Total length:			43:50
