= Shoulda Been Home =

Studio album by Robert Cray
- Released: 2001
- Recorded: Woodland (Nashville, Tennessee); Royal (Memphis, Tennessee)
- Genre: Blues
- Length: 52:45
- Label: Rykodisc
- Producer: Steve Jordan

Robert Cray chronology
Take Your Shoes Off (1999)	Shoulda Been Home (2001)	Time Will Tell (2003)

Professional ratings
Review scores
Source	Rating
AllMusic	4.5/5 stars
The Penguin Guide to Blues Recordings	4/4 stars
PopMatters	Positive
Rolling Stone	Mixed

Shoulda Been Home is a 2001 album by blues musician Robert Cray consisting of 12 new tracks, seven of them written or co-written by Cray. It was released by Rykodisc Records.

== Track listing ==
All tracks composed by Robert Cray; except where indicated

1. "Baby's Arms" – 2:55
2. "Already Gone" – 6:32
3. "Anytime" (Jim Pugh) – 5:26
4. "Love Sickness" (Mack Rice) 2:59
5. "I'm Afraid" – 3:11
6. "No One Special" – 4:47
7. "Out of Eden" (Jim Pugh) – 9:19
8. "Cry for Me Baby" (Mel London) – 3:06
9. "Far Away" (Cray, S. Turner) – 6:24
10. "Renew Blues" (Cray, Jim Pugh, Kevin Hayes, Karl Sevareid) – 1:02
11. "Help Me Forget" – 4:18
12. "The 12 Year Old Boy" (Mel London) – 2:46

== Personnel ==
- Robert Cray - Guitar, Vocals
- Jim Pugh - Keyboards
- Karl Sevareid - Bass (tracks: 1 to 4, 6 to 12)
- Willie Weeks - Bass (tracks: 5)
- Kevin Hayes - Drums (tracks: 1 to 4, 6 to 12)
- Steve Jordan - Drums (tracks: 5, 8, 10); Percussion (tracks: 6, 7); Guitar, Backing Vocals (track: 4)
- Andrew Love - Tenor Saxophone (tracks: 1, 4)
- Jack Hale Sr. - Trombone (tracks: 1, 4)
- Ben Cauley - Trumpet (tracks: 1, 4)
