= Get Up & Dance (The Memphis Horns album) =

Studio album by The Memphis Horns
- Released: 1977
- Recorded: 1977
- Genre: Soul, Funk, Disco
- Label: RCA Records
- Producer: Alan V. Abrahams, Clarence K. McDonald

The Memphis Horns chronology
| High On Music (1976) | Get Up & Dance (1977) | The Memphis Horns Band II (1978) |

Get Up & Dance is the fourth album by The Memphis Horns. It contains the singles "Get Up And Dance" and "What The Funk", as well as the group's biggest hit, the jazzy slow jam "Just For Your Love", which reached #17 on the R&B Charts.

Professional ratings
Review scores
| Source | Rating |
|---|---|
| Allmusic | 2/5 stars |

== Track listing ==
1. "Get Up and Dance"
2. "Just for Your Love"
3. "Waitin' for the Flood"
4. "Love Is Happiness"
5. "Memphis Nights"
6. "What the Funk"
7. "Country Soul"
8. "No Go Betweens"
9. "Don't Abuse It"
10. "Keep On Smilin'"

== Personnel ==
- Jack Hale – trombone (solo)
- James Mitchell – baritone saxophone
- Lewis Collins – tenor saxophone, soprano saxophone
- Andrew Love – tenor saxophone
- Wayne Jackson – trumpet

== Charts ==
| Chart (1977) | Peak position |
|---|---|
| Billboard Soul Albums | 32 |

=== Singles ===
| Year | Single | Chart positions |
| Year | Single | US R&B |
|---|---|---|
| 1977 | "Get Up and Dance" | 61 |
| 1977 | "Just for Your Love" | 17 |
| 1977 | "What The Funk" | 83 |
