= Don't Be Afraid of the Dark (album) =

Studio album by the Robert Cray Band
- Released: August 8, 1988
- Genre: Urban blues
- Length: 41:28
- Label: Mercury
- Producers: Bruce Bromberg, Dennis Walker

The Robert Cray Band chronology
Strong Persuader (1986)	Don't Be Afraid of the Dark (1988)	Midnight Stroll (1990)

Professional ratings
Review scores
Source	Rating
AllMusic	3/5 stars
Chicago Sun-Times	4/4 stars
The Encyclopedia of Popular Music	4/5 stars
The Penguin Guide to Blues Recordings	3.5/4 stars
Record Mirror	4/5 stars
Rolling Stone	3.5/5 stars
The Village Voice	A−

Don't Be Afraid of the Dark, released in 1988, is American blues musician Robert Cray's follow-up to Strong Persuader. It was unable to match the mainstream success of Strong Persuader, peaking at number 32 on the Billboard 200 and staying on the chart for 60 weeks.

== Track listing ==
1. "Don't Be Afraid of the Dark" (Dennis Walker) – 3:47
2. "Don't You Even Care?" (Cray) – 3:56
3. "Your Secret's Safe with Me" (Peter Boe, Dennis Walker) – 4:52
4. "I Can't Go Home" (Cray) – 4:23
5. "Night Patrol" (David Amy) – 4:43
6. "Acting This Way" (Peter Boe, Richard Cousins) – 4:26
7. "Gotta Change the Rules" (Cray) – 3:24
8. "Across the Line" (David Amy, Peter Boe, Cray, David Olson) – 4:07
9. "At Last" (Cray, Patsy Sermersheim) – 3:30
10. "Laugh Out Loud" (Dennis Walker) – 4:20

== Personnel ==
- Fidel Bell – assistant engineer
- Peter Boe – keyboards
- Charlie Brocco – mixing assistant
- Richard Cousins – bass
- Robert Cray – guitar, vocals
- Bill Dashiell – engineer
- Deborah Feingold – photography
- Bernie Grundman – mastering
- Jeff Hendrickson – mixing
- Mike Kloster – assistant engineer
- The Memphis Horns – arranger, horn, horn arrangements
  - Wayne Jackson – trombone, trumpet
  - Andrew Love – tenor saxophone
- Dave Olson – drums
- David Sanborn – alto saxophone on "Acting This Way"
- Chris Thompson – design

== Certifications and sales ==
Region	Certification	Certified units/sales
Canada (Music Canada)	Gold	50,000^{^}
Netherlands (NVPI)	Gold	50,000^{^}
New Zealand (RMNZ)	Platinum	15,000^{^}
United Kingdom (BPI)	Gold	100,000^{^}
United States (RIAA)	Gold	500,000^{^}
^{^} Shipments figures based on certification alone.
