= Bring 'Em In (Buddy Guy album) =

Studio album by Buddy Guy
- Released: September 27, 2005
- Studio: Brooklyn Recording, NYC, New York, USA.
- Genre: Chicago blues, electric blues
- Length: 60:00
- Label: Jive, Silvertone
- Producer: Steve Jordan

Buddy Guy chronology
Blues Singer (2003)	Bring 'Em In (2005)	Skin Deep (2008)

Bring 'Em In is the 13th studio album by blues musician Buddy Guy, released in 2005 on Silvertone Records. The album is made up almost entirely of songs covered by Buddy Guy, containing only one original composition by the artist.

The album features a number of collaborations with other artists including: Carlos Santana (guitar), Tracy Chapman (vocals), John Mayer (guitar), Keb' Mo' (guitar), Anthony Hamilton (vocals), Robert Randolph (pedal steel), and Keith Richards (guitar).

== Background ==
Stevie Jordan was brought on as the producer, and musicians with close ties to Jordan, including Keith Richards, Bernie Worrell, and Ivan Neville, also participated in the recording sessions. However, for "I Put a Spell on You", guest artist Carlos Santana also served as the producer. The album primarily consists of covers of soul and R&B songs.

== Reception and awards ==
Professional ratings
Review scores
Source	Rating
AllMusic	3/5 stars
Blogcritics	(positive)
Rolling Stone	3/5 stars
Robert Christgau	(3-star Honorable Mention)

In the United States, the album reached number 152 on the Billboard 200, peaked at number 2 on Billboard’s Blues Albums chart, and reached number 5 on the Top Heatseekers chart. It was nominated for Best Contemporary Blues Album at the 48th Annual Grammy Awards. In France, the album spent a total of nine weeks on the album chart, peaking at number 137.

Sean Westergaard of AllMusic gave the album three out of five stars, noting that "the backing often leans more toward professional execution than passion" and that "Guy's performances are solid, but the arrangements do not always suit him." He praised the contributions of Robert Randolph and Keith Richards, stating that their performances "fit the songs well and contribute impressively."

== Track listing ==
No.	Title	Writer(s)	Length
1.	"Now You're Gone"	Curtis Mayfield, Joseph Scott	5:03
2.	"Ninety Nine and One Half"	Eddie Floyd, Steve Cropper, Wilson Pickett	3:48
3.	"What Kind of Woman Is This"	Buddy Guy	5:17
4.	"Somebody's Sleeping in My Bed"	Allen A. Jones, Bettye Crutcher	6:25
5.	"I Put a Spell on You" (featuring Carlos Santana)	Screamin' Jay Hawkins	4:04
6.	"On a Saturday Night"	Eddie Floyd, Steve Cropper	3:18
7.	"Ain't No Sunshine" (featuring Tracy Chapman)	Bill Withers	3:25
8.	"I've Got Dreams to Remember" (featuring John Mayer)	Joe Rock, Otis Redding, Zelma Redding	4:56
9.	"Lay Lady Lay" (featuring Anthony Hamilton and Robert Randolph)	Bob Dylan	4:35
10.	"Cheaper to Keep Her/Blues in the Night"	Bonny Rice, Harold Arlen, Johnny Mercer	6:18
11.	"Cut You Loose"	Mel London	7:39
12.	"The Price You Gotta Pay" (featuring Keith Richards)	Keb' Mo'	3:41
13.	"Do Your Thing"	Isaac Hayes	4:07

== Charts ==
Chart (2013)	Peak position
French Albums (SNEP)	137
US Billboard 200	152
US Top Blues Albums (Billboard)	2

== Personnel ==
=== Musicians ===
- Buddy Guy - lead vocals, lead guitar
- Willie Weeks - bass
- Myron Dove - bass
- Steve Jordan - drums, backing vocals
- Luis Conte - percussion
- Bernie Worrell - keyboards
- Ivan Neville - keyboards, backing vocals
- Chester Thompson - keyboards
- Danny Kortchmar - guitar
- Jack Hale - trombone
- Ben Cauley - trumpet
- Andrew Love - tenor saxophone
- Lannie McMilan - tenor saxophone
- Jim Horn - baritone saxophone, flute

=== Guest musicians ===
- Carlos Santana - track 5
- Tracy Chapman- track 7
- Keb' Mo' - track 7
- John Mayer - track 8
- Anthony Hamilton, Robert Randolph - track 9
- Keith Richards - guitar on "The Price You Gotta Pay"

=== Production ===
- Steve Jordan - Producer
- Don Smith - Recording
- Willie Mitchell and Lester Snell - Horn Arrangements
- Jim Horn - Horn Arrangement on Track 9
- Derrick Santini - Photographer
