= LaVette! =

Studio album by Bettye LaVette
- Released: June 16, 2023
- Length: 54:06
- Label: Jay-Vee
- Producer: Steve Jordan

Bettye LaVette chronology
Blackbirds (2020)	LaVette! (2023)

LaVette! is a studio album by Bettye LaVette, released through Jay-Vee Records on July 16, 2023. The album consists of cover versions of songs written by American musician singer-songwriter Randall Bramblett, whom LaVette called "the best writer that I have heard in the last 30 years". It was produced by Steve Jordan and includes collaborations with Pedrito Martinez, Steve Winwood, Anthony Hamilton, Ray Parker Jr., Charles Hodges, John Mayer and Jon Batiste. LaVette embarked on a tour in mid-2023 in support of the album.

== Critical reception ==
Professional ratings
Aggregate scores
Source	Rating
AnyDecentMusic?	7.2/10
Metacritic	84/100
Review scores
Source	Rating
American Songwriter	4/5 stars
The Guardian	4/5 stars
The Observer	3/5 stars
Pitchfork	7.7/10

LaVette! received a score of 84 out of 100 on review aggregator Metacritic based on eight critics' reviews, indicating "generally favorable" reception. Stephen M. Deusner called it LaVette's "loosest and most daring album in years, an affectionate tribute to an underappreciated figure that could easily be renamed Bramblett! in LaVette's hands" and felt that Bramblett "emerges as a deft stylist who mixes various strains of Southern music with slyly evocative turns of phrase, self-denigrating humor, and big questions about existence and spirituality". Uncut magazine remarked that "LaVette remains at the peak of her considerable powers at the age of 77".

Reviewing the album for The Guardian, Stevie Chick stated that although she is backed by "stellar musos", LaVette is the "true focus" as "she has trodden these paths of heartbreak enough times to roll her damned eyes, and you can hear that in her seasoned rasp". Hal Horowitz of American Songwriter felt that LaVette "takes these obscure selections, and like her one-time contemporary, Aretha Franklin, makes them her own" as she "takes Bramblett's often oblique, sometimes stream of consciousness, always carefully crafted lyrics and filters them through her soul-drenched pipes". Neil Spencer of The Observer commented that LaVette "continues her renaissance with an album of songs that play to her considerable strengths".

Jim Hynes of Glide Magazine called Jordan's production "eminently funky", which "works well for a while but begins to wear thin, rescued in the latter half by tracks such as 'Concrete Mind', 'Not Gonna Waste My Love' and the superb closer 'It's Alright', which do the best job of depicting LaVette's endearing, pour-it-all-out and leave-nothing-on-the-floor-vocals".

== Track listing ==
All tracks are written by Randall Bramblett.

LaVette! track listing
No.	Title	Length
1.	"See Through Me" (featuring Pedrito Martinez)	3:48
2.	"Don't Get Me Started" (featuring Steve Winwood)	5:11
3.	"Lazy (And I Know It)"	5:17
4.	"Sooner or Later" (featuring Anthony Hamilton, Ray Parker Jr. and Charles Hodges)	5:03
5.	"Plan B"	3:43
6.	"Concrete Mind"	4:13
7.	"In the Meantime" (featuring John Mayer)	4:31
8.	"Mess About It" (featuring Ray Parker Jr. and Jon Batiste)	5:48
9.	"Hard to Be a Human"	4:40
10.	"I'm Not Gonna Waste My Love"	4:57
11.	"It's Alright"	6:55
Total length:		54:06

== Charts ==
Chart performance for LaVette!
Chart (2023)	Peak position
UK Americana Albums (Official Charts)	17
UK R&B Albums (Official Charts)	13
US Top Blues Albums (Billboard)	4
