= That's What I Heard =

Studio album by Robert Cray
- Released: February 28, 2020
- Genre: Blues; Southern soul
- Length: 47:53
- Label: Nozzle
- Producer: Steve Jordan

Robert Cray chronology
4 Nights of 40 Years Live (2015)	That's What I Heard (2020)

That's What I Heard is a studio album by American musician Robert Cray. It was released on February 28, 2020, under Nozzle Records.

== Critical reception ==
Professional ratings
Aggregate scores
Source	Rating
Metacritic	83/100
Review scores
Source	Rating
AllMusic	4/5 stars
American Songwriter	3.5/5 stars
And It Don't Stop	(3-star Honorable Mention)

"That's What I Heard " was met with widespread critical acclaim. At Metacritic, which assigns a weighted average rating out of 100 to reviews from mainstream publications, this release received an average score of 83, based on 6 reviews. Reviewing in his "Consumer Guide" column, Robert Christgau highlighted the songs "This Man", "Burying Ground", and "My Baby Likes to Boogalo", while writing in the summary of the album: "At 66, one of the sharpest songwriters ever to identify bluesman identifies the abuser in the house and invents a dance called the FBI". Mark Deming of AllMusic wrote in his review: "At a time when deep Southern soul isn't doing a whole lot better than the blues in the marketplace, Robert Cray is an effective cheerleader for both forms."

== Awards ==
That's What I Heard received the Soul Blues Album award at the 2021 Blues Music Award.

== Track listing ==
That's What I Heard track listing
No.	Title	Length
1.	"Anything You Want"	3:52
2.	"Burying Ground"	2:58
3.	"You're the One"	2:49
4.	"This Man"	5:06
5.	"You'll Want Me Back"	3:58
6.	"Hot"	3:44
7.	"Promises You Can't Keep"	5:55
8.	"To Be with You"	2:54
9.	"My Baby Likes to Boogaloo"	3:50
10.	"Can't Make Me Change"	5:03
11.	"A Little Less Lonely"	4:19
12.	"Do It"	3:25

== Charts ==
Chart performance for That's What I Heard
Chart (2020)	Peak position
German Albums (Offizielle Top 100)	75
Swiss Albums (Schweizer Hitparade)	47
US Top Blues Albums (Billboard)	1
US Top Album Sales (Billboard)	55
