= Nothin but Love =

Studio album by Robert Cray
- Released: August 28, 2012
- Studios: Revolver, Thousand Oaks, Ca
- Genre: Blues
- Label: Provogue
- Producer: Kevin Shirley

Robert Cray chronology
Cookin' in Mobile (2010)	Nothin but Love (2012)	In My Soul (2014)

Nothin but Love is the 16th studio album by the American blues guitarist Robert Cray. It was released on August 28, 2012, through Provogue Records. It was his first studio album since 2009's This Time. The album was released on CD and vinyl.

== Critical reception ==
Professional ratings
Review scores
Source	Rating
AllMusic	3.5/5 stars
The New Yorker	(favorable)
The Observer	4/5 stars

In AllMusic, Hal Horowitz said, "The differences in Robert Cray albums are subtle but noticeable to fans of the veteran soul-bluesman. He retains the same backing trio on this 2012 release as on 2009's studio disc, with the only major difference in personnel being the addition of noted roots producer Kevin Shirley... The description of how a wrecked marriage is revealed in the empty residence a couple left behind in 'Great Big Old House' is prime Cray, too, and a worthy successor to any of his other popular busted matrimony songs. Even if the guitarist has worked this terrain plenty of times before, he is still refining and even improving the template. That makes this another quality entry in a catalog of albums over a three-decade-and-counting-year career that has remarkably few weak spots."

== Track listing ==
1. "Won't Be Coming Home" (Richard Cousins, Hendrix Ackle)
2. "Worry" (Jim Pugh, Tony Braunagel)
3. "I'll Always Remember You" (Pugh)
4. "Side Dish" (Robert Cray)
5. "A Memo" (Cousins, Ackle)
6. "Blues Get Off My Shoulder" (Bobby Parker Jr.)
7. "Fix This" (Cray)
8. "I'm Done Cryin'" (Cray)
9. "Great Big Old House" (Cray)
10. "Sadder Days" (Cray)

== Limited Edition Deluxe Version ==
11. "You Belong to Me" (Bonus Track) (Pee Wee King)

The Limited Edition Deluxe Version also includes an extended booklet (40 pages) with The Making of the album by Henry Yates, as well as other album information.

== Personnel ==
Robert Cray Band

- Robert Cray – vocals, guitar
- Jim Pugh – piano, Hammond organ
- Richard Cousins – bass
- Tony Braunagel – drums

Additional personnel

- Jeff Bova – string arrangements
- Ron Dziubla – saxophone
- Vincenzo Giammanco – photography
- Jeff Katz – photography
- Roy Koch – artwork
- Jared Kvitka – engineer
- Kevin Shirley – mixing, producer
- Lee Thornburg – horn arrangements, trombone, trumpet
- Leon Zervos – mastering

== Charts ==
Chart (2012–2013)	Peak position
U.S. Billboard 200	187
U.S. Billboard Top Blues Albums	2
U.S. Billboard Independent Albums	34
