= Time Will Tell (Robert Cray album) =

Studio album by Robert Cray
- Released: 2003
- Genre: Soul blues
- Length: 48:52
- Label: Sanctuary
- Producer: Robert Cray, Jim Pugh

Robert Cray chronology
Shoulda Been Home (2001)	Time Will Tell (2003)	Twenty (2005)

Professional ratings
Review scores
Source	Rating
AllMusic	3.0/5 stars
The Penguin Guide to Blues Recordings	2.5/4 stars

Time Will Tell is an album by Robert Cray. It was released in 2003 through Sanctuary Records.

== Track listing ==
1. "Survivor" (Cray) – 5:14
2. "Up in the Sky" (Pugh) – 4:54
3. "Back Door Slam" (Hayes, Hayes) – 4:39
4. "I Didn't Know" (Cray) – 5:00
5. "Your Pal" (Pugh) – 5:01
6. "Lotta Lovin'" (Cray) – 4:52
7. "What You Need (Good Man)" (Hayes, Hayes) – 5:16
8. "Spare Some Love?" (Cray) – 3:42
9. "Distant Shore" (Pugh) – 4:49
10. "Time Makes Two" (Cray) – 5:24

== Personnel ==
- Robert Cray – guitar, electric bluesitar, vocals
- Jim Pugh – keyboards
- Karl Sevareid – electric bass, acoustic bass
- Kevin Hayes – drums
- Cynthia Robinson - trumpet

== Note ==
Robert Cray performs "Time Makes Two" on Eric Clapton's 2004 Crossroads Guitar Festival DVD.
