= I Was Warned =

Studio album by Robert Cray
- Released: April 1992
- Recorded: Fantasy, L.A.
- Genre: Blues
- Length: 48:30
- Label: Mercury
- Producer: Dennis Walker

Robert Cray chronology
| Midnight Stroll (1990) | I Was Warned (1992) | Shame + A Sin (1993) |

Professional ratings
Review scores
| Source | Rating |
|---|---|
| AllMusic | 2.5/5 stars |
| Chicago Tribune | 2.5/4 stars |
| Christgau's Consumer Guide | A− |
| DownBeat | 3.5/5 stars |
| Entertainment Weekly | B+ |
| Los Angeles Times | 2.5/4 stars |
| The Penguin Guide to Blues Recordings | 3/4 stars |
| Q | 3/5 stars |
| Rolling Stone | 3/5 stars |

I Was Warned is a blues album by Robert Cray. It was released in April 1992 through Mercury Records. Like Cray's previous album, it features his regular backing band playing alongside the Memphis Horns.

== Critical reception ==
In AllMusic, Daniel Gioffre wrote of the album:

[...] the tracks are devoid of any kind of dirt whatsoever, which prevents them from really kicking the listener the way that they should. Granted, Cray isn't R. L. Burnside or even Buddy Guy, but a little more grit to the band performances, arrangements, tones, and recording would go a long way toward aiding the emotional kick of his admittedly great set of pipes. Cray is also not aided by the writing, which is hit or miss throughout. [...] His playing is powerful and idiosyncratic, but his intensity and focus are unfortunately not matched by other aspects of this recording. I Was Warned is not a bad Cray album by any means; it just lacks the sort of fire that would make it really take off.

== Track listing ==
1. "Just a Loser" (Tim Kaihatsu) – 4:23
2. "I'm a Good Man" (Cray, Dennis Walker) – 4:12
3. "I Was Warned" (Cray, Dennis Walker) – 7:15
4. "The Price I Pay" (Cray, Dennis Walker) – 5:06
5. "Won the Battle" (Jim Pugh, Dennis Walker) – 3:53
6. "On the Road Down" (Cray, Steve Cropper) – 4:02
7. "A Whole Lotta Pride" (Cray, Dennis Walker) – 4:34
8. "A Picture of a Broken Heart" (Boz Scaggs, Dennis Walker) – 5:22
9. "He Don't Live Here Anymore" (Jim Pugh, Dennis Walker) – 5:13
10. "Our Last Time" (John Hanes, Jim Pugh) – 5:10

== Personnel ==
- Robert Cray – vocals, guitar
- Jim Pugh – keyboards
- Karl Sevareid – bass
- Kevin Hayes – drums
- Tim Kaihatsu – rhythm guitar

Memphis Horns

- Andrew Love – tenor saxophone
- Wayne Jackson – trumpet, trombone
