= Shame + A Sin =

Studio album by Robert Cray
- Released: 1993
- Recorded: Studio D (Sausalito, California)
- Genre: Blues
- Length: 47:37
- Label: Mercury
- Producer: Robert Cray

Robert Cray chronology
I Was Warned (1992)	Shame + A Sin (1993)	Some Rainy Morning (1995)

Shame + A Sin is an album by the American musician Robert Cray. It was released in 1993 by Mercury Records.

== Production ==
The album was produced by Cray. "You're Gonna Need Me" is a cover of the Albert King song, and features a guest appearance by Albert Collins on guitar.

== Critical reception ==
Professional ratings
Review scores
Source	Rating
AllMusic	4/5 stars
Calgary Herald	B+
The Indianapolis Star	3/4 stars
The Penguin Guide to Blues Recordings	3/4 stars

The Indianapolis Star noted that "Cray uses the blues to inspire, strike an attitude and, gee, even have some fun." The Calgary Herald deemed the album "still more downtown professional than lunch-bucket working class."

== Track listing ==
All tracks composed by Robert Cray; except where indicated

1. "1040 Blues"- 5:04
2. "Some Pain, Some Shame" - 4:30
3. "I Shiver"- 5:12
4. "You're Gonna Need Me" (Albert King) - 3:38
5. "Don't Break This Ring" - 4:55
6. "Stay Go" (Cray, Jim Pugh, Karl Sevareid) - 3:38
7. "Leave Well Enough Alone" - 5:20
8. "Passing By" - 5:12
9. "I'm Just Lucky That Way" (Rick Estrin, Jim Pugh, Donnie Woodruff) - 4:00
10. "Well I Lied" (Kevin Hayes, Chris Hayes) - 2:49
11. "Up and Down" (Cray, Jim Pugh) - 6:39

== Credits ==
- Robert Cray – vocals, guitar
- Jim Pugh – keyboards
- Karl Sevareid – bass
- Kevin Hayes – drums
- Edward Manion – tenor saxophone, baritone saxophone
- Mark Pender – trumpet
- Albert Collins - guitar on "You’re Gonna Need Me"
- Mike Kappus – executive producer
