= Twenty (Robert Cray album) =

Studio album by Robert Cray
- Released: May 24, 2005
- Recorded: Sound City (Van Nuys, California)
- Genre: Blues
- Length: 43:18
- Label: Sanctuary
- Producer: Robert Cray, James Pugh

Robert Cray chronology
Time Will Tell (2003)	Twenty (2005)	Live from Across the Pond (2006)

Professional ratings
Review scores
Source	Rating
AllMusic	3/5 stars
Blender	3/5 stars
Christgau's Consumer Guide	(3-star Honorable Mention)
The Encyclopedia of Popular Music	3/5 stars
Mojo	3/5 stars
PopMatters	7/10 stars
Rolling Stone	3/5 stars

Twenty is a blues album by Robert Cray. It was released on May 24, 2005, through Sanctuary Records.

== Track listing ==
All tracks composed by Robert Cray; except where indicated

1. "Poor Johnny" – 5:01
2. "That Ain't Love" – 4:43
3. "Does It Really Matter" (Scott Mathews, James Pugh) – 3:54
4. "Fadin' Away" – 3:56
5. "My Last Regret" (James Pugh) – 3:50
6. "It Doesn't Show" – 3:54
7. "I'm Walkin'" (Chris Hayes, Kevin Hayes) – 3:54
8. "Twenty" – 6:46
9. "I Know You Will" (John Hanes, James Pugh) – 4:14
10. "I Forgot to Be Your Lover" (William Bell, Booker T. Jones) – 2:17
11. "Two Steps from the End" (James Pugh) – 4:29

== Personnel ==
- Robert Cray - guitar, vocals
- James Pugh - keyboards
- Karl Sevareid - electric bass, acoustic bass
- Kevin Hayes - drums
