= Some Rainy Morning =

Studio album by Robert Cray
- Released: 1995
- Recorded: Studio D (Sausalito, California)
- Genre: Blues
- Length: 51:04
- Label: Mercury
- Producer: Robert Cray

Robert Cray chronology
Shame + A Sin (1993)	Some Rainy Morning (1995)	Sweet Potato Pie (1997)

Professional ratings
Review scores
Source	Rating
AllMusic	3/5 stars
The Penguin Guide to Blues Recordings	2.5/4 stars

Some Rainy Morning is a blues album by Robert Cray, released in 1995 through Mercury Records.

== Track listing ==
1. "Moan" (Cray) - 6:01
2. "I'll Go On" (Cray) - 4:11
3. "Steppin' Out" (Howard Grimes, Andrew Hall, Earl Randle) - 4:48
4. "Never Mattered Much" (Cray) - 4:46
5. "Tell the Landlord" (Cray, Kevin Hayes, Karl Sevareid) - 4:53
6. "Little Boy Big" (Cray) - 5:12
7. "Enough for Me" (Cray, Kevin Hayes) - 6:20
8. "Jealous Love" (King Curtis, Bobby Womack) - 4:13
9. "Will You Think of Me" (Cray, Jimmy Pugh) - 5:29
10. "Holdin' On" (Jimmy Pugh) - 6:31
11. "Love Well Spent" (Jimmy Pugh, Kenney Dale Johnson) (bonus track; only on European edition) - 4:45

== Personnel ==
- Robert Cray - vocals, guitar
- Jimmy Pugh - organ, piano
- Karl Sevareid - bass
- Kevin Hayes - drums
