= Midnight Stroll =

Studio album by Robert Cray
- Released: June 1990
- Genre: Blues
- Length: 46:55
- Label: Mercury
- Producer: Dennis Walker

Robert Cray chronology
Don't Be Afraid of the Dark (1988)	Midnight Stroll (1990)	I Was Warned (1992)

Professional ratings
Review scores
Source	Rating
AllMusic	3.5/5 stars
The Penguin Guide to Blues Recordings	3.5/4 stars
Select	4/5 medals

Midnight Stroll is a blues album by Robert Cray that features the Memphis Horns. It was released in June 1990 through Mercury Records.

Also released in the UK on Mercury was an advance four-track EP called The Midnight Stroll EP. Tracks on this are: "The Forecast (Calls for Pain)", "Holdin' Court", "Labor of Love" and "Midnight Stroll". MERCD 330. (Maybe also released elsewhere as INT 878 209-2.)

== Track listing ==
1. "The Forecast (Calls for Pain)" (David Plenn, Dennis Walker) – 4:00
2. "These Things" (Cray) – 4:55
3. "My Problem" (Cray) – 4:41
4. "Labor of Love" (Tim Kaihatsu) – 3:56
5. "Bouncin' Back" (Dennis Walker) – 4:05
6. "Consequences" (Bonnie Hayes, Kevin Hayes, David Nagler-Burns) – 4:24
7. "The Things You Do to Me" (Cray) – 4:44
8. "Walk Around Time" (Kevin Hayes, Jimmy Pugh, Oscar Washington) – 4:18
9. "Move a Mountain" (Cray, Tim Kaihatsu) – 4:07
10. "Holdin' Court" (Richard Cousins, Hayes) – 4:40
11. "Midnight Stroll" (Cray, Dennis Walker) – 5:49

== Personnel ==
- Robert Cray - vocals, guitar
- Jimmy Pugh - keyboards
- Richard Cousins - bass
- Kevin Hayes - drums, percussion
- Tim Kaihatsu - rhythm guitar

The Memphis Horns

- Wayne Jackson - trumpet, trombone
- Andrew Love - tenor saxophone

== Charts ==
Chart (1990)	Peak position
UK Albums (OCC)	19

== Certifications and sales ==
Region	Certification	Certified units/sales
United Kingdom (BPI)	Silver	60,000^{^}
United States (RIAA)	Gold	500,000^{^}
^{^} Shipments figures based on certification alone.
