= HighTone Records =

American independent record label

- Parent company: Concord
- Founded: 1983
- Founder: Larry Sloven; Bruce Bromberg
- Defunct: 2008
- Status: Defunct
- Distributor: Concord Bicycle Music
- Genre: Rockabilly, western swing, country, blues, gospel
- Country of origin: U.S.
- Location: Oakland, California
- Official website: hightonerecords.com

HighTone Records was an American independent record label based in Oakland, California, United States. HighTone specialized in American roots music including, country, rockabilly, western swing, blues and gospel. The label was created by Larry Sloven and Bruce Bromberg in 1983. The label's first release that year was Bad Influence by bluesman Robert Cray. In 1984, the label released Frankie Lee's debut album, The Ladies and the Babies. Some of the label's releases in the late 1980s featured Joe Louis Walker including Cold is the Night and The Gift.

Between 1995 and 2000, the label issued three albums by James Armstrong (Sleeping with a Stranger, Dark Night, and Got It Goin' On). From 1997 to 2005 it reissued much of the High Water Recording Company catalogue of LPs on CD. In 1997, Clara McDaniel recorded her debut album, Unwanted Child, which was released on HighTone.

In September 2006, the label released a five CD boxed set titled American Music: The HighTone Records Story. This release compiled many of the labels's most influential recordings. In 2008, the company sold the catalog to Shout! Factory, which continued to release reissues and compilations. In 2016, Hightone was bought by Concord Bicycle Music from Shout! Factory.

== See also ==
- List of record labels
