= Strong Persuader =

Studio album by Robert Cray
- Released: November 17, 1986
- Studios: Sage & Sound and Haywood's in Los Angeles
- Genres: Blues, soul
- Length: 39:34
- Label: Mercury
- Producers: Bruce Bromberg, Dennis Walker

Robert Cray chronology
Showdown! (1985)	Strong Persuader (1986)	Don't Be Afraid of the Dark (1988)

Singles from Strong Persuader
- 1. "Smoking Gun" Released: 1986; 2. "I Guess I Showed Her" Released: 1987; 3. "Nothin' but a Woman" Released: 1987; 4. "Right Next Door (Because of Me)" Released: 1987

Strong Persuader is the fourth studio album by American blues singer and guitarist Robert Cray. It was recorded by Cray at the Los Angeles studios Sage & Sound and Haywood's with producers Bruce Bromberg and Dennis Walker, before being released on November 17, 1986, by Mercury Records and Hightone Records. Strong Persuader became his mainstream breakthrough and by 1995 it had sold over two million copies. The record was later ranked No. 42 on Rolling Stone's list of the 100 greatest albums of the eighties.

== Commercial reception ==
In Cray's home country of the United States, the album ranked highly on various Billboard charts, reaching number 13 on the Billboard 200, number 17 on the Contemporary Jazz Albums chart, number 20 on the Jazz Albums chart, and number 21 on the R&B Albums chart. Singles from the album also performed well: "Smoking Gun" reached number 22 on the U.S. singles chart, while "Because of Me" peaked at number 80. In February 1988, the album was certified Platinum by the RIAA, and in June 1996 it was certified Double Platinum.

The album was also a hit outside the United States. In 1987, it spent six weeks at number one on the Dutch Albums Chart, and it remained in the top 10 for six consecutive weeks on the New Zealand Albums Chart.

== Critical reception ==
Professional ratings
Retrospective reviews
Review scores
Source	Rating
AllMusic	5/5 stars
Christgau's Record Guide: The '80s	A+
The Encyclopedia of Popular Music	4/5 stars
The Penguin Guide to Blues Recordings	4/4 stars

Strong Persuader received rave reviews from contemporary critics. In a review for Rolling Stone, Jon Pareles said Cray delivered intriguing stories about sex and infidelity with disciplined singing, songwriting, and "a version of blues and soul that doesn't come from any one region, building an idiom for songs that tell with conversational directness the stories of ordinary folks". Robert Christgau from The Village Voice praised Cray's sophisticated blues aesthetic and the songwriting of his supporting studio team, hailing Strong Persuader as "the best blues record in many, many years, so fervently crafted that it may even get what it deserves and become the first album to break out of the genre's sales ghetto since B.B. King was a hot item."

At the end of 1986, Strong Persuader was voted the third best album of the year in the Pazz & Jop, an annual poll of American critics published by The Village Voice. Christgau, the poll's supervisor, ranked it fourth on his own year-end list. In a retrospective review, AllMusic critic Bill Dahl said "it was [Cray's] innovative expansion of the genre itself that makes this album a genuine 1980s classic."

Cray won the Grammy Award for Best Contemporary Blues Album for this release.

== Track listing ==
1. "Smoking Gun" (David Amy, Richard Cousins, Robert Cray) – 4:07
2. "I Guess I Showed Her" (Dennis Walker) – 3:39
3. "Right Next Door (Because of Me)" (Dennis Walker) – 4:19
4. "Nothin' but a Woman" (David Amy, Cousins, Cray, Peter Boe, David Olson) – 3:58
5. "Still Around" (Peter Boe) – 3:42
6. "More Than I Can Stand" (Cray) – 2:57
7. "Foul Play" (Dennis Walker) – 4:07
8. "I Wonder" (Cray) – 3:57
9. "Fantasized" (Dennis Walker) – 4:04
10. "New Blood" (David Amy, Peter Boe, Cray, Ozall Washington) – 4:21

== Personnel ==
- Fidel Bell – mixing assistant
- Charlie Brocco – mixing assistant
- Peter Boe – keyboards
- Bruce Bromberg – producer (songwriting credit: David Amy)
- Richard Cousins – bass
- Robert Cray – guitar, vocals
- David Olson – drums
- Lee Spath – percussion
- Andrew Love – tenor saxophone
- Wayne Jackson – trumpet, trombone

== Singles ==
Year	Release	Chart positions		
Year	Release	UK	US	US M.
1986	"Smoking Gun"	—	22	2
1987	"Right Next Door (Because of Me)"	50	80	27
1987	"I Guess I Showed Her"	—	—	28

== Charts ==
=== Weekly charts ===
Chart (1986–1988)	Peak position
Australian Albums (Kent Music Report)	6
Canada Top Albums/CDs (RPM)	34
Dutch Albums (Album Top 100)	1
New Zealand Albums (RMNZ)	5
UK Albums (Official Charts)	34
US Billboard 200	13
US Top Contemporary Jazz Albums (Billboard)	17
US Top Jazz Albums (Billboard)	20
US Top R&B Albums (Billboard)	21

=== Year-end charts ===
Chart (1987)	Position
Dutch Albums (MegaCharts)	3
New Zealand Albums (RMNZ)	20
US Billboard 200	24
US Top R&B/Hip-Hop Albums (Billboard)	49

== Certifications ==
Region	Certification	Certified units/sales
Australia (ARIA)	Platinum	70,000^{^}
Canada (Music Canada)	Gold	50,000^{^}
Netherlands (NVPI)	Platinum	100,000^{^}
New Zealand (RMNZ)	4× Platinum	60,000^{^}
United Kingdom (BPI)	Gold	100,000^{^}
United States (RIAA)	2× Platinum	2,000,000^{^}
^{^} Shipments figures based on certification alone.
