= Sweet Potato Pie (album) =

Studio album by Robert Cray
- Released: 1997
- Recorded: Ardent, Memphis, Tennessee
- Genre: Blues, R&B
- Length: 47:13
- Label: Mercury
- Producer: Robert Cray

Robert Cray chronology
Some Rainy Morning (1995)	Sweet Potato Pie (1997)	Take Your Shoes Off (1999)

Sweet Potato Pie is an album by the American musician Robert Cray, released in 1997 through Mercury Records. Cray produced the album. It was recorded by John Hampton and Skidd Mills (who also did the mixing) at Ardent Studios, in Memphis, Tennessee. "Trick or Treat" is a cover of the Otis Redding song.

Cray supported the album by touring with B. B. King. Sweet Potato Pie peaked at No. 184 on the Billboard 200. It was nominated for a Grammy Award for "Best Contemporary Blues Album".

== Critical reception ==
Professional ratings
Review scores
Source	Rating
AllMusic	3/5 stars
Chicago Tribune	2.5/4 stars
The Encyclopedia of Popular Music	4/5 stars
Los Angeles Daily News	3/4 stars
MusicHound Blues: The Essential Album Guide	2.5/5 stars
The Penguin Guide to Blues Recordings	3/4 stars
USA Today	3/4 stars

The Los Angeles Daily News noted that "the material here has a muscular '60s and '70s soul feel... Cray's vocals aren't just paying lip service to Southern r&b heroes O.V. Wright and James Carr." USA Today said that "Cray sings mostly about love and loss, the band's bluesy sound punctuated by the Memphis Horns." The Chicago Tribune concluded that most of the songs "are bland ballad or mid-tempo tunes that do little to distinguish themselves."

== Track listing ==
All tracks composed by Robert Cray; except where indicated

1. "Nothing Against You" - 5:46
2. "Do That for Me" - 4:26
3. "Back Home" - 5:59
4. "Save It" - 3:32 (bonus track; only on European edition)
5. "The One in the Middle" (Jimmy Pugh) - 5:17
6. "Little Birds" - 3:50
7. "Trick or Treat" (Otis Redding) - 3:10
8. "Simple Things" - 4:46
9. "Jealous Minds" (Kevin Hayes, Jimmy Pugh) - 4:43
10. "Not Bad for Love" - 7:12
11. "I Can't Quit" - 5:04

== Personnel ==
- Robert Cray – vocals, guitar
- Jimmy Pugh – keyboards
- Karl Sevareid – bass
- Kevin Hayes – drums
