= Robert Cray =

American blues guitarist and singer (born 1953)

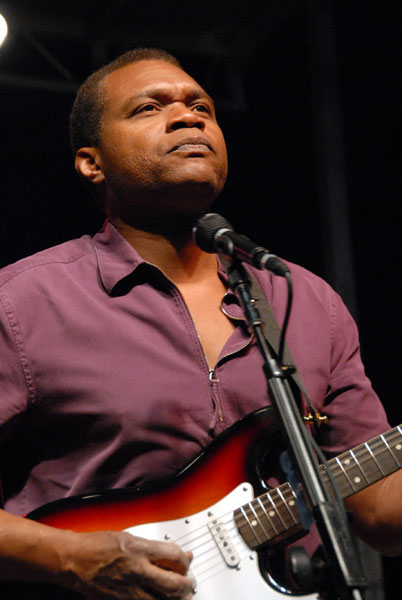
- Cray performing in concert, 2007

Background information
- Also known as: Night Train Clemons
- Born: Robert William Cray; August 1, 1953 (age 73); Columbus, Georgia, U.S.
- Origin: Newport News, Virginia, U.S.
- Genres: Blues, blues rock, soul blues
- Occupations: Musician; songwriter
- Instruments: Guitar; vocals
- Years active: 1974–present
- Labels: Nozzle; Warner; Provogue; Vanguard; Sanctuary; Rykodisc; PolyGram; Mercury; HighTone; Tomato
- Member of: The Robert Cray band
- Spouse: Susan Turner
- Website: robertcray.com

Robert William Cray (born August 1, 1953) is an American blues guitarist and singer. He has led his own band and won five Grammy Awards.

== Early life ==
Cray was born on August 1, 1953, in Columbus, Georgia, while his father was stationed at Fort Benning. Cray's musical beginnings go back to when he was a student at Denbigh High School in Newport News, Virginia. While there, he played in his first band, The One-Way Street. His family eventually settled in the Tacoma, Washington, area. There, he attended Lakes High School in Lakewood, Washington.

== Career ==
By the age of 20, Cray had seen his heroes Albert Collins, Freddie King and Muddy Waters in concert and decided to form his own band; they began playing college towns on the West Coast. In the late 1970s he lived in Eugene, Oregon, where he formed the Robert Cray Band and collaborated with Curtis Salgado in the Cray-Hawks. In the 1978 film National Lampoon's Animal House, Cray was the uncredited bassist in the house party band Otis Day and the Knights.

=== 1980s ===
Cray released the album Who's Been Talkin' on Tomato Records in 1980. Two albums on HighTone Records in the mid-1980s, Bad Influence and False Accusations, were moderately successful in the United States and in Europe, where he was building a reputation as a live artist. In 1985, he released the album Showdown! with his hero Albert Collins and Johnny Copeland.

Cray was signed to Mercury Records and in 1986 released his fourth album, Strong Persuader, produced by Dennis Walker, which received a Grammy Award, while the crossover single "Smoking Gun" gave him wider appeal and name recognition. Under the pseudonym "Night Train Clemons", he recorded with Ted Hawkins in 1986. He was invited by Keith Richards to join the backing band for Chuck Berry in the 1987 film, Chuck Berry: Hail! Hail! Rock 'N' Roll, directed by Taylor Hackford. In 1987, Tina Turner invited Cray to be part of her Break Every Rule television special.

By the late 1980s, Cray was an opening act for such major stars as Eric Clapton and sold out larger venues as a solo artist. Cray has generally played Fender guitars (Telecasters and Stratocasters) and there are two signature Robert Cray Stratocasters models available from Fender. The Robert Cray Custom Shop Stratocaster is made in the U.S. in the Fender custom shop and is identical to the guitars that Cray currently plays, while the Robert Cray Standard Stratocaster is a cheaper model made in Fender's Ensenada plant in Mexico.

=== 1990s ===
Cray had the opportunity to play alongside John Lee Hooker on his album Boom Boom, playing the guitar solo in the song "Same Old Blues Again". He is also featured on the Hooker album, The Healer; he plays a guitar solo on the song "Baby Lee". The entire Robert Cray Band backs Hooker on the title track of his 1992 album Mr. Lucky, where Cray plays lead guitar, sings, and banters with Hooker throughout the song. The band also appears on two songs on B.B. King's 1993 duet album Blues Summit: the duet between King and Cray, which was written by Cray and Dennis Walker specifically for the project and called "Playin' With My Friends", and the duet between King and John Lee Hooker ("You Shook Me").

In August 1990, Cray played with Eric Clapton, Buddy Guy, Jimmie Vaughan, and Stevie Ray Vaughan at the Alpine Valley Music Theatre in East Troy, Wisconsin, performing "Sweet Home Chicago". This was Stevie Ray Vaughan's final performance before he died in a helicopter accident later that night.

Cray was invited to play at the "Guitar Legends" concerts in Seville, Spain at the 1992 Expo, where he played a signature track, "Phone Booth". Albert Collins was also on the bill on this blues night of the "Legends" gigs.

=== 2000–present ===
In 2005, Cray was inducted into Hollywood's RockWalk at Guitar Center.

Cray continues to record and tour. He appeared at the Crossroads Guitar Festival, and supported Eric Clapton on his 2006-2007 world tour.

In 2011, Cray was inducted to the Blues Hall of Fame and received the Americana Music Lifetime Achievement Award for Performance in 2017.

After controversy with Eric Clapton about lyrics of the song "Stand and Deliver" by Van Morrison, Cray canceled his participation in Clapton's 2022 Europe tour.

== Robert Cray Band ==
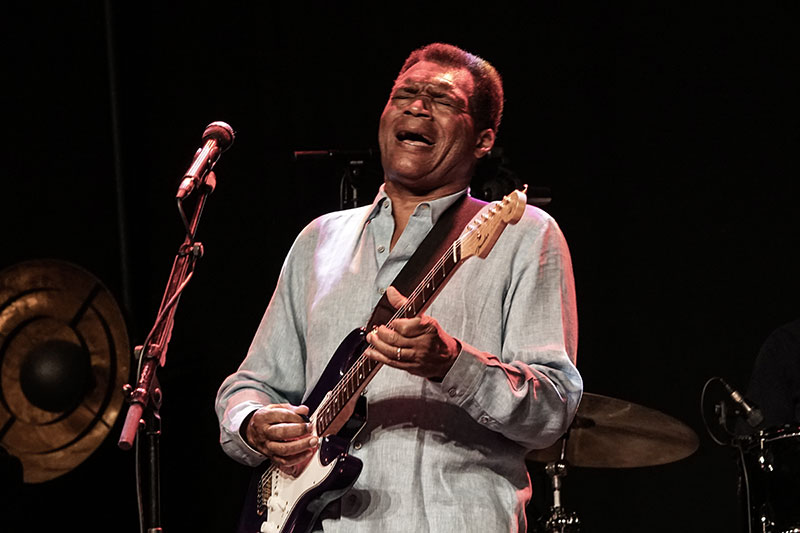
Cray in Denmark, 2018

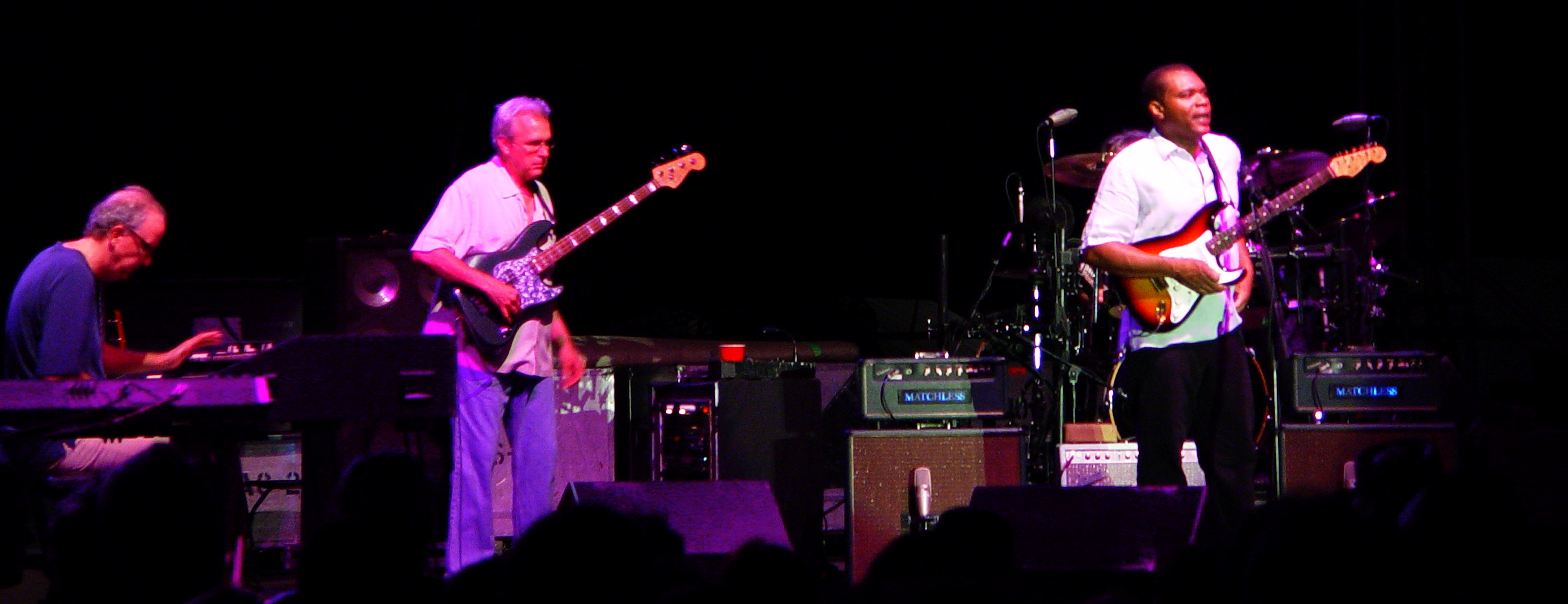
The Robert Cray Band in 2007

Current Members:

- Robert Cray – lead/rhythm guitar, vocals
- Richard Cousins – bass guitar
- Les Falconer – drums
- Dover Weinberg – keyboards

Past Members:

- Peter Boe – keyboards
- Alan Chez – trumpet
- Terence F. Clark – drums
- George Sluppick – drums
- Tony Braunagel - drums
- Kevin Hayes – drums (1989–2008)
- Wayne Jackson – trumpet
- Tim Kaihatsu – rhythm guitar
- Andrew Love – saxophone
- Ed Manion – saxophone
- Rocky Manzanares – harp
- Tom Murphy – drums
- David Olson – drums
- Mark Pender – trumpet
- Jimmy Pugh – keyboards
- Warren Rand – alto saxophone
- Curtis Salgado – harp
- Karl Sevareid – bass
- David Stewart – keyboards
- Mike Vannice – saxophone

== Discography ==
External videos
- Oral History, Robert Cray talks about growing up in Washington, and going to the local music store and dreaming about becoming a musician.” Interview date August 8, 2014, NAMM (National Association of Music Merchants) Oral History Library

Studio albums

- Who's Been Talkin' (1980)
- Bad Influence (1983)
- False Accusations (1985)
- Strong Persuader (1986)
- Don't Be Afraid of the Dark (1988)
- Midnight Stroll (1990)
- I Was Warned (1992)
- Shame + A Sin (1993)
- Some Rainy Morning (1995)
- Sweet Potato Pie (1997)
- Take Your Shoes Off (1999)
- Shoulda Been Home (2001)
- Time Will Tell (2003)
- Twenty (2005)
- This Time (2009)
- Nothin but Love (2012)
- In My Soul (2014)
- Robert Cray & Hi Rhythm (2017)
- That's What I Heard (2020)
