= Bruce Bromberg =

American blues producer (1941–2021)

Bruce Bromberg (October 31, 1941 – December 27, 2021) was an American Grammy Award winning producer of blues music.

He was born in Chicago, and raised there and in Park Forest, Illinois. In 1958, he moved with his family to Los Angeles, and began working for various record labels. Since the late 1960s, he was responsible for producing albums by Lightnin' Hopkins, Phillip Walker, Johnny Shines, Lonesome Sundown, Ted Hawkins, Robert Cray, Joe Louis Walker, Dave Alvin, Chris Thomas King, Johnny Childs and many others, as well as supervising many reissues of archive material. He formed HighTone Records with Larry Sloven in 1983, and achieved success with Cray's albums in particular from the early 1980s onwards. The label was sold in 2008.

Bromberg was announced as an inductee to the Blues Hall of Fame for 2011.

He died on December 27, 2021, after a long illness.
