= 2009 in American music =

The following is a list of notable music events and releases that occurred in 2009 in the United States.

== Events ==
=== January ===
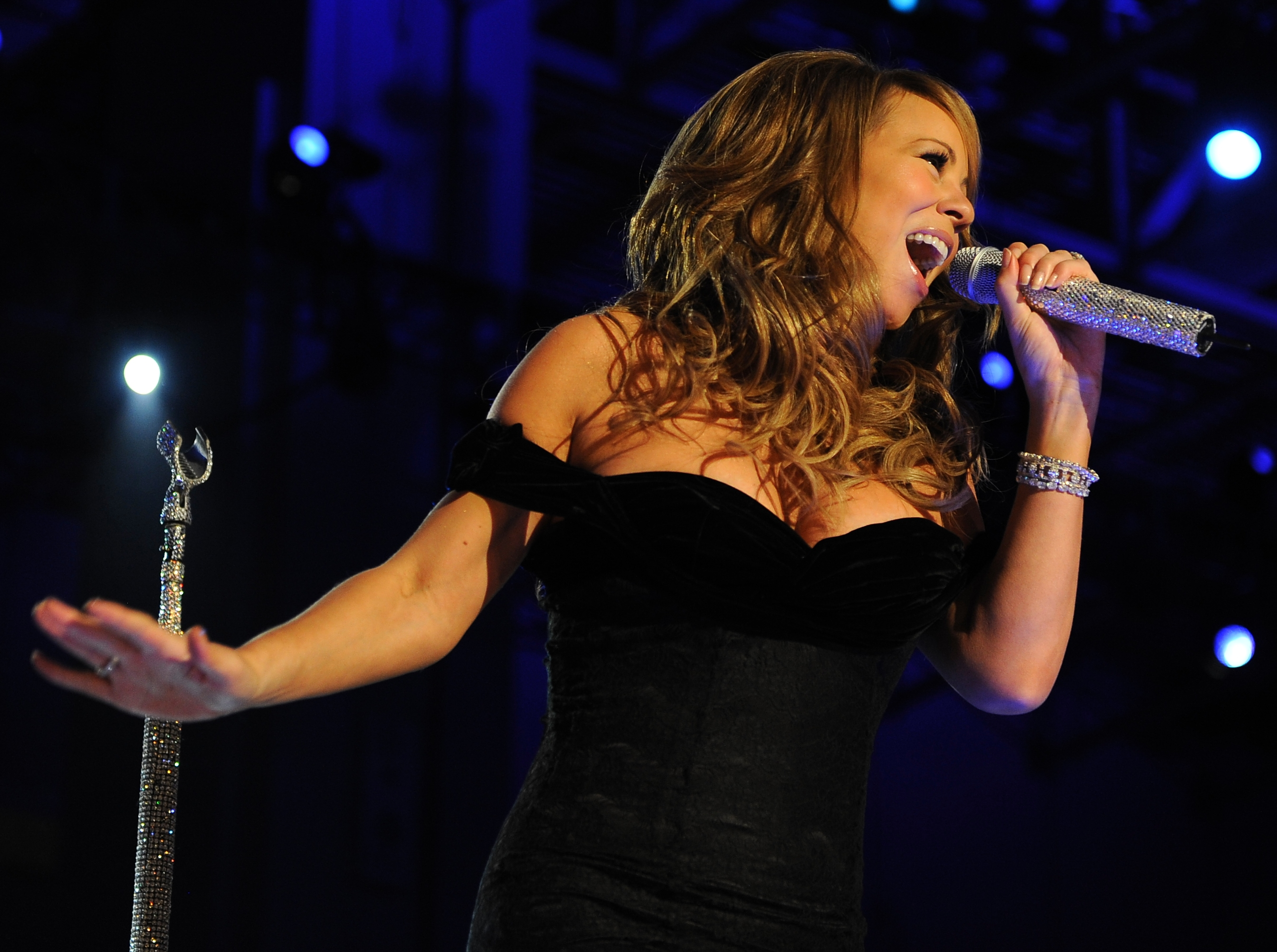
Mariah Carey performing "Hero" at the Inauguration Ball for President Barack Obama.

- 8 – Lady Gaga's debut single "Just Dance" hits number one on the Billboard Hot 100 after 22 weeks – the second longest climb to number one, since the Creed single, "With Arms Wide Open", in November 2000 (27 weeks).
- 18 – President Barack Obama's inaugural concert, entitled "We Are One", is held at the Lincoln Memorial. Performers include Mary J. Blige, Garth Brooks, Renée Fleming, Caleb Green, Josh Groban, Herbie Hancock, Heather Headley, Beyoncé, Bettye LaVette, Pete Seeger, Bruce Springsteen, James Taylor and Stevie Wonder. Several of the songs performed had been used by Obama's presidential campaign.
- 20 – Artists including Mariah Carey, Jay-Z, Alicia Keys, Faith Hill, Mary J. Blige, Maroon 5, Stevie Wonder and Will.i.am perform at the Inaugural Ball for President Barack Obama
- 28 – Kelly Clarkson breaks the record for a song's biggest jump to number 1 on the Billboard Hot 100 when her single "My Life Would Suck Without You" soars from number 97 to number one fueled by 280,000 digital downloads in the first week of release. Clarkson first broke the record in 2002 with "A Moment Like This".
  - Billy Powell of Lynyrd Skynyrd died at the age of 56 at his home in Orange Park, Florida.
- 29 – Madonna announces that she will extend her record-breaking Sticky & Sweet Tour during summer 2009, to visit cities that were excluded during the first run. The tour kicked off at The O_{2} in London on July 4. The extension took the Sticky & Sweet Tour to a total of over 80 shows, putting it among the top five tours of all time.

=== February ===
- 1 – At Super Bowl XLIII at Raymond James Stadium in Tampa, Florida, Faith Hill and Jennifer Hudson perform at the pregame show (with Hudson singing the National Anthem) and Bruce Springsteen at the halftime show.
- 3 – The Fray released their first studio album in four years, The Fray.
  - The Von Bondies released their first studio album in five years, Love, Hate and Then There's You.
- 8 – The 51st Annual Grammy Awards took place at the Staples Center in Los Angeles. Alison Krauss and Robert Plant took home the most awards with five each, including Album of the Year with their collaborative album, Raising Sand.
  - At the Grammys, Blink-182 announced their reunion and reunion tour after a five-year hiatus.
  - R&B singer Chris Brown is arrested after he physically assaulted his then girlfriend, Rihanna. He is charged with assault and making criminal threats, and received five years of probation.
- 10 – Dan Auerbach of The Black Keys released his first solo studio album, Keep It Hid.
- 12 – "Crack a Bottle", performed by Eminem, Dr. Dre and 50 Cent, sets a new record for opening week download sales in the United States, at 418,000 copies. The previous record (335,000) was set by "Live Your Life".
  - Billboard announces that Madonna is the highest-earning entertainer of 2008, with US$242,176,466, mostly from her sold-out Sticky & Sweet Tour.
- 18 – Flo Rida breaks his own record when his single "Right Round" is downloaded 636,000 units in the opening week. His 2008 chart-topper "Low" set the previous record for most downloaded song with 467,000 units sold in the first week of release.
- 17 – J-Kwon released his first studio album in five years, Hood Hop 2.
  - Living Things released their first studio album in four years, Habeas Corpus.
- 24 – Chris Isaak released his first studio album in five years, Mr. Lucky.
  - Lamb of God album Wrath debuts at number 2 on the Billboard 200, making it the highest charting extreme metal album in the last fifteen years.

=== March ===
- 3 – Britney Spears launches her world tour at New Orleans Arena in New Orleans, Louisiana. The 97-show tour was her first world tour in five years, and her first tour since her public breakdown.
- 5 – Michael Jackson announces his last concert series, This Is It to be held at The O_{2} in London. The concerts are never held due to Jackson's death three months later.
- 6–8 – Phish's reunion shows at Hampton Coliseum in Virginia.
- 11 – Tickets go on sale for Michael Jackson's This Is It series, 10 shows extended to 50 shows and impressively all 50 dated sold out in under four hours making them the fastest selling concerts ever in history.
- 17 – Capone-N-Noreaga released their first studio album in nine years, Channel 10.

=== April ===
- 1 – Lady Gaga becomes the first artist since Christina Aguilera in 1999/2000 to reach the top of the Billboard Hot 100 with their first two chart entries ("Just Dance" and "Poker Face").
- 4 – The 2009 Rock and Roll Hall of Fame induction ceremony takes place, welcoming new inductees Little Anthony & The Imperials, Bobby Womack, Run-D.M.C., and Metallica. Metallica, citing the drama surrounding Blondie, Black Sabbath, and Van Halen's inductions, includes Cliff Burton and Jason Newsted, both former bassists for the band, in the induction. Newsted also performs with band in its first rendition as a 5-piece band featuring two bass guitarists.
- 5 – The 44th Academy of Country Music Awards took place at the MGM Grand Garden Arena in Las Vegas. Carrie Underwood wins the ACM Entertainer of the Year award, becoming only the seventh female to do so in the history of the ceremony's 44 years.
- 7 – Jadakiss released his first studio album in five years, The Last Kiss.
- 12 – Carrie Underwood's "I Told You So", from her album Carnival Ride, becomes her tenth straight number one in the country songs chart, making her the only country artist in history to have their first 10 singles reach number one.
- 14 – Fastball released their first studio album in five years, Little White Lies.
  - Jill Sobule released her first studio album in five years, California Years.
- 17–19 – Coachella 2009
  - Hardline released their first album in seven years, Leaving the End Open.
- 27 – Creed announced their reunion, new album and tour after a five-year break. They break up for a second time in 2013, only to reunite again in July 2023.

=== May ===
- 3 – A concert at Madison Square Garden to celebrate the 90th birthday of Pete Seeger features Bruce Springsteen, Joan Baez, Roger McGuinn, Dave Matthews and Eddie Vedder among others.
- 12 – Lin-Manuel Miranda and Alex Lacamoire perform a rap about Alexander Hamilton at a White House Evening of Poetry, Music and the Spoken Word in Washington, D.C.; this is the origin of the musical Hamilton.
- 15 – Eminem released his first studio album in five years, Relapse.
  - Green Day released their first studio album in five years, 21st Century Breakdown.
- 18 – Rapper Dolla is shot and killed in Beverly Hills, California at the Beverly Center.
- 19 – Method Man & Redman released their first studio album in ten years, Blackout! 2.
- 20 – Kris Allen defeats Adam Lambert to win the eighth season of American Idol. This would turn out to be original judge Paula Abdul's last season on the show as she stepped down on August 4, 2009.

=== June ===
- 1 – The Puerto Rican pop singer Ricky Martin announces he is working on a new studio album and first book.
  - Pearl Jam are first musical guests on The Tonight Show with Conan O'Brien, performing new songs.
- 2 – Dave Matthews Band released their first studio album in four years, Big Whiskey & the GrooGrux King. It is their first release since the death of saxophonist LeRoi Moore, who died a year earlier.
  - Rancid released their first studio album in six years, Let the Dominoes Fall. It is also their first album with Branden Steineckert, formerly of The Used, who replaced Brett Reed on drums following Reed's departure in 2006.
  - 311 released their first studio album in four years, Uplifter.
- 3 – The Black Eyed Peas released their first studio album in four years, The E.N.D..
- 25 – Summerfest begins; the event lasts until July 5.
  - Roughly two weeks before his This Is It series of concerts is scheduled to begin, Michael Jackson dies in his Los Angeles home of an accidental overdose of propofol, later discovered to be the result of medical malpractice by his personal physician, Conrad Murray. The American music icon's passing triggers a surge in posthumous sales making him the best selling artist of the year, with 35 million albums sold worldwide in the months following his death.

=== July ===
- 7 – A public memorial event for Michael Jackson is held at the Staples Center. Artists such as Stevie Wonder, Usher, Mariah Carey, Jennifer Hudson, John Mayer, Lionel Richie, and Michael's brother, Jermaine Jackson, perform.
  - Maxwell released his first studio album in eight years, BLACKsummers'night.
- 10 – August 15:– Rockstar Energy Mayhem Festival, headlined by Marilyn Manson and Slayer
- 13 – Lady Gaga becomes the first artist to have three songs from a debut album to reach number 1 on the Billboard Hot 100 since Fergie's The Dutchess.
- 17–21 – Paul McCartney performs three sold-out concerts at Citi Field to open the stadium with opening act, The Script. This is because on August 15, 1965, The Beatles performed the first concert at Shea Stadium and McCartney joined Billy Joel on stage a year ago for the last concert there. Joel joined McCartney again on the first night.
- 24 – Blink-182 start their reunion tour, Blink-182 in Concert, with Fall Out Boy and Weezer.

=== August ===
- 8 – Meghan Lindsay and Josh Jones of Steel Magnolia won the second season of CMT's Can You Duet. Brandon Green and Jonathan Cox of JB Rocket were named runner-up.
- 18 – Third Eye Blind released their first studio album in six years, Ursa Major.
- 21 – Vocalist Jim Lindberg announces his departure from Pennywise.

=== September ===
- 3 – Michael Jackson is interred at Forest Lawn Memorial Park, Glendale, in a private family ceremony.
- 8 – Phish release their first studio album in five years, Joy.
- 13 – The MTV Video Music Awards took place at Radio City Music Hall in New York City. During Taylor Swift's acceptance speech for Best Female Video, Kanye West interrupts on her stage her saying, that Beyoncé had one of the best videos of all time. He was referring to Beyoncé's "Single Ladies (Put a Ring on It)". West was removed from the show.
- September 15 – Living Colour released their first studio album in six years, The Chair in the Doorway.
- 17 – VH1 Divas returned after a five-year hiatus. It took place the Brooklyn Academy of Music in Brooklyn.
- 29 – Alice in Chains released their first studio album in 14 years, Black Gives Way to Blue. It is also the band's first album to feature co-lead vocalist William DuVall, who joined the band in 2006 as the replacement for the band's original lead vocalist, Layne Staley, following Staley's death in 2002.
- 30 – Australian star Kylie Minogue kicks off her first-ever U.S. tour in Oakland, California.

=== October ===
- 2–4 – Austin City Limits 2009
- 6 – Kiss released their first studio album in 11 years, Sonic Boom.
  - Lita Ford released her first studio album in fourteen years, Wicked Wonderland.
- 15 – Britney Spears's "3" enters the Billboard Hot 100 at number one, her third number one on Billboard Hot 100 and the first non-American Idol related single to enter the chart at number one since 1999.
- 27 – Creed released their first studio album in eight years, Full Circle.
- 28 – Michael Jackson's This Is It, featuring behind the scenes footage in the days before his death, is released. It enters the chart at No. 1, and becomes the best selling documentary of all time, raising over $250 million.

=== November ===
- 11 – The Country Music Association Awards took place at the Sommet Center in Nashville, Tennessee. Brad Paisley and Carrie Underwood's second year hosting.
- 12 – Steven Tyler denies he is quitting Aerosmith, despite rumors that the band would be in need of a new lead singer.
- 22 – The American Music Awards took place at the Microsoft Theater in Los Angeles.

=== December ===
- 8 – Thirty Seconds to Mars released their first studio album in four years, This Is War.
  - The Mighty Mighty Bosstones released their first studio album in seven years, Pin Points and Gin Joints.
- 11 – Garth Brooks comes out of retirement for a solo acoustic show at the Encore Theater at Wynn Las Vegas.
- 16 – John Frusciante announces his second departure from the Red Hot Chili Peppers.

== Bands formed ==
- Alabama Shakes
- Awolnation
- Beach Fossils
- Big Something
- Chris & Jenna
- Churchill
- The Civil Wars
- Cloud Nothings
- The Colourist
- Creep
- The Dead Weather
- Echosmith
- FIDLAR
- Foster the People
- Grouplove
- The Head and the Heart
- Highly Suspect
- Macklemore & Ryan Lewis
- Nick Jonas & the Administration
- Of Mice & Men
- OMG
- The Orwells
- Pigeons Playing Ping Pong
- The Pretty Reckless
- Reptar
- Sleeper Agent
- Steel Magnolia
- Sublime with Rome
- Surfer Blood
- The Texas Tenors
- Them Crooked Vultures
- Twenty One Pilots
- We Are the Fallen
- The Young Veins

== Bands reformed ==
- Blink-182
- Cave In
- Cold
- Creed
- Faith No More
- Limp Bizkit
- Matchbook Romance

== Bands on hiatus ==
- Discovery
- Fall Out Boy
- Girls Against Boys
- The Pussycat Dolls
- Stellastarr

== Bands disbanded ==
- Armor for Sleep
- The Dead
- The Honorary Title
- Houston Calls
- Jonezetta
- Louis XIV
- The Lovemakers
- Matchbook Romance

== Albums released ==
=== January ===
Date	Album	Artist	Genre(s)
6	Merriweather Post Pavilion	Animal Collective	Psychedelic pop; electronic pop; synth-pop; indie; avant-pop
12	Audacity	Ugly Duckling	hip-hop
13	New World Orphans	Hed PE	Nu metal; rap metal
13	003	Oh No Not Stereo	Power pop
19	The Crying Light	Antony and the Johnsons	Baroque pop
20	Blood Bank (EP)	Bon Iver	Indie folk
20	Noble Beast	Andrew Bird	Baroque pop
20	The Harvest Floor	Cattle Decapitation	Technical death metal; deathgrind
20	Davy	Coconut Records	Indie pop; indie rock
20	Why There Are Mountains	Cymbals Eat Guitars	Indie rock
20	Fiction Family	Fiction Family	Acoustic; folk-pop; roots rock
20	The Empyrean	John Frusciante	Experimental rock; psychedelic rock; post-rock
20	Slow & Steady Seduction: Phase II	Anya Marina	Indie rock; pop rock; indie pop
20	Grand	Matt and Kim	Dance-punk; indie rock; indie pop; lo-fi
20	The Crawling Distance	Robert Pollard	Rock; indie rock
20	Mirror Eye	Psychic Ills	Rock
20	Fame, Fortune and Fornication	Reel Big Fish	Ska punk
20	Mantis	Umphrey's McGee	Progressive rock
27	Ray Guns Are Not Just the Future	The Bird and the Bee	Indie pop; electronic
27	Crooked X	Crooked X	Hard rock; heavy metal
27	Simon (EP)	Dirty Little Rabbits	Indie rock
27	For(N)ever	Hoobastank	Alternative rock; post-grunge
27	Eye Legacy	Lisa "Left Eye" Lopes	Pop-rap; hip-hop; R&B
27	The Time of the Assassins	Nickel Eye	Indie rock
27	Whisper House	Duncan Sheik	Pop
27	Working on a Dream	Bruce Springsteen	Rock

=== February ===
Date	Album	Artist	Genre(s)
2	Changing Horses	Ben Kweller	Country rock; alt-country; folk rock
3	Feel That Fire	Dierks Bentley	Country
3	Evisceration Plague	Cannibal Corpse	Death metal
3	Homesick	A Day to Remember	Metalcore; alternative rock; post-hardcore
3	The Fray	The Fray	Alternative rock; pop rock; Christian rock
3	Sing: Chapter 1	Wynonna Judd	Country
3	Distractions (EP)	The Loved Ones	Punk rock; Americana; pop-punk
3	The Pains of Being Pure at Heart	The Pains of Being Pure at Heart	Indie pop; dream pop; noise pop
3	Lonely Road	The Red Jumpsuit Apparatus	Alternative rock; emo; pop-punk; post-grunge; hard rock
3	Two Tongues	Two Tongues	Pop-punk; indie rock; emo
3	Love, Hate and Then There's You	The Von Bondies	Alternative rock; garage rock; indie rock; post-punk revival; punk blues
3	Wavvves	Wavves	Noise pop; indie pop; lo-fi
10	Keep It Hid	Dan Auerbach	Blues rock; garage rock; indie folk; neo-psychedelia
10	The Rebirth	Bobby V	Contemporary R&B
10	Testimony: Vol. 2, Love & Politics	India.Arie	R&B
10	Ryan Leslie	Ryan Leslie	R&B; hip-hop
10	Incredibad	The Lonely Island	Comedy hip-hop
10	Innocence & Instinct	Red	Alternative metal; post-grunge
15	Scrambles	Bomb the Music Industry!	Punk rock; indie rock
17	The Century of Self	...And You Will Know Us by the Trail of Dead	Art rock
17	Sagarmatha	The Appleseed Cast	Indie rock; post-rock
17	Hush	Asobi Seksu	Dream pop
17	March of the Zapotec/Holland EP	Beirut	Indie pop; Balkan folk; electronica
17	Jason Isbell and the 400 Unit	Jason Isbell	Americana; folk
17	Hood Hop 2	J-Kwon	Hip-hop
17	Habeas Corpus	Living Things	Indie rock
17	Hold Time	M. Ward	Alternative rock; folk
17	Pins & Panzers	Plushgun	New wave; indie rock; synth-pop
17	Carving Desert Canyons	Scale the Summit	Progressive metal; djent; instrumental rock
17	Common Existence	Thursday	Post-hardcore
17	Self-Taught Learner	Lissy Trullie	Indie
17	Animals in the Dark	William Elliott Whitmore	Blues; Country
23	Wrath	Lamb of God	Groove metal; thrash metal; metalcore
24	Smoke n Mirrors	B-Real	West Coast hip-hop; Latin hip-hop
24	200 Million Thousand	Black Lips	Garage punk; psychedelic rock
24	Padded Room	Joe Budden	Hip-hop
24	Hungry Bird	Clem Snide	Alternative country
24	Ordinary Riches	Company of Thieves	Indie rock; alternative rock; pop rock
24	Earthsblood	God Forbid	Metalcore; thrash metal
24	Mr. Lucky	Chris Isaak	Rock and roll
24	This Gigantic Robot Kills	MC Lars	Nerdcore; ska punk; West coast hip-hop
24	Easy Does It	Jake Owen	Country
24	Real Recognize Real	Project Pat	Southern hip-hop; gangsta rap
27	Cars	Now, Now Every Children	Indie pop

=== March ===
Date	Album	Artist	Genre(s)
1	Mama, I'm Swollen	Cursive	Emo; indie rock
3	Middle Cyclone	Neko Case	Alternative country; indie folk
3	Little Hells	Marissa Nadler	Folk
3	The Now and Not Yet	Jeremy Riddle	Christian
10	All I Ever Wanted	Kelly Clarkson	Pop; pop rock
10	Scream	Chris Cornell	Pop rock; dance pop
10	No Regrets	Dope	Industrial metal; nu metal; alternative metal
10	Love vs. Money	The-Dream	R&B
10	The Distance	Taylor Hicks	Blue-eyed soul; pop
10	Round 2	J. Holiday	R&B; hip-hop
10	Death to Analog	Julien-K	Electronic rock; dance rock; alternative rock
10	Not Without a Fight	New Found Glory	Pop-punk
10	Worse Than Alone	The Number Twelve Looks Like You	Mathcore
10	More Grey Hairs	Reks	Hip-hop
10	Underneath the Owl	The Riverboat Gamblers	Alternative rock; indie rock
10	Take Everything	Seventh Day Slumber	Christian rock
10	It's Blitz!	Yeah Yeah Yeahs	Synth-punk; alternative pop; synth-pop; pop rock
17	When I Hit the Ground	Ace Enders and a Million Different People	Alternative rock; indie rock; acoustic
17	Beware	Bonnie "Prince" Billy	Americana; alternative country; indie folk
17	Channel 10	Capone-N-Noreaga	East Coast hip-hop; hardcore hip-hop; gangsta rap
17	Don't Feed da Animals	Gorilla Zoe	Hip-hop
17	Naked Willie	Willie Nelson	Country
17	Cult of Static	Static-X	Industrial metal; nu metal
17	Industry Giants	Superdrag	Punk rock; power pop; shoegaze; indie rock
18	Cheers!	Ballyhoo!	Punk rock; reggae rock
20	NINJA 2009 Tour Sampler (EP)	Nine Inch Nails, Jane's Addiction and Street Sweeper Social Club	Alternative rock
24	Approaching Normal	Blue October	Alternative rock
24	Carolina	Eric Church	Country
24	Hannah Montana: The Movie	Miley Cyrus	Pop; country
24	Bromst	Dan Deacon	Indietronica; noise pop
24	The Hazards of Love	The Decemberists	Folk rock; progressive rock; art rock; folk metal
24	Fangs	Falling Up	Art rock; experimental rock
24	In a Perfect World	Keri Hilson	R&B
24	Let's Do It Again	Leela James	R&B; soul
24	Pray IV Reign	Jim Jones	Hip-hop
24	Freedom	Mandisa	Gospel; CCM; R&B
24	Shine	Martina McBride	Country
24	Crack the Skye	Mastodon	Heavy metal; progressive metal; alternative metal
24	Born Like This	MF Doom	Hip-hop
24	On the Cover II	MxPx	Punk rock
24	Metamorphosis	Papa Roach	Glam metal; hard rock
24	Son of a Preacher Man	John Rich	Country
24	Boss of All Bosses	Slim Thug	Hip-hop
24	Running With the Wasters	The Takeover UK	Alternative rock
24	A New Hope	Vanna	R&B

=== April ===
Date	Album	Artist	Genre(s)
7	Wide Open	Jason Aldean	Country
7	When Sweet Sleep Returned	Assemble Head in Sunburst Sound	Ambient noise; electronic
7	Back to Tennessee	Billy Ray Cyrus	Country
7	Repo	Black Dice	Psychedelic rock
7	The Last Kiss	Jadakiss	East coast hip-hop; hardcore hip-hop
7	Guilt	Mims	East coast hip-hop; hip-hop; rap rock
7	Life and Times	Bob Mould	Alternative rock; rock
7	Unstoppable	Rascal Flatts	Country
7	Now We Can See	The Thermals	Indie rock; punk rock
14	Mind the Drift	Big Business	Heavy metal
14	Forever in a Day	Day26	R&B
14	Little White Lies	Fastball	Rock
14	Whatever Gets You Off	The Last Vegas	Hard rock; glam metal; heavy metal; glam rock
14	House of a Thousand Guitars	Willie Nile	Rock
14	Everything She Touched Turned Ampexian	Prefuse 73	Electronic
14	Swoon	Silversun Pickups	Alternative rock; indie rock; post-punk revival
14	California Years	Jill Sobule	Folk-pop
17	Leaving the End Open	Hardline	Hard rock
18	The Intervention (EP)	The Color Fred	Acoustic; indie rock
20	The Infection	Chimaira	Groove metal; metalcore
20	To the Death	Earth Crisis	Metalcore
20	Asleep in the Bread Aisle	Asher Roth	Hip-hop
21	Hell or High Water	As Cities Burn	Indie rock
21	Doors and Window	Bearfoot	Bluegrass; Americana
21	Love the Future	Chester French	Indie pop; futurepop; synth-pop; electronic
21	Wavering Radiant	Isis	Post-metal; sludge metal; progressive metal
21	The Long Fall Back to Earth	Jars of Clay	Christian rock; electronic pop; pop rock; synth-pop
21	The Future Will Come	The Juan MacLean	House; nu-disco
21	Mean Everything to Nothing	Manchester Orchestra	Indie rock; alternative rock
21	Here, Here, and Here	Meg & Dia	Alternative rock; indie rock; indie pop
21	Deeper Than Rap	Rick Ross	Hip-hop
21	Tinted Windows	Tinted Windows	Alternative rock; power pop; post-punk revival
27	Blood	OSI	Progressive metal
28	Self-Titled Album	The Audition	Pop-punk
28	Growing Up Is Getting Old	Jason Michael Carroll	Country
28	Brother's Blood	Kevin Devine	Indie rock; alternative rock
28	Together Through Life	Bob Dylan	Folk rock; blues rock
28	Ben Folds Presents: University A Cappella!	Ben Folds	A capella
28	Halestorm	Halestorm	Hard rock; post-grunge
28	The Devil You Know	Heaven & Hell	Heavy metal
28	The Voice	Mike Jones	Hip-hop
28	Coaster	NOFX	Punk rock; pop-punk; skate punk; jazz punk
28	Help	Osees	Alternative rock; garage rock; noise rock; psychedelic rock
28	Sickology 101	Tech N9ne	Hip-hop
28	Wooden Arms	Patrick Watson	Dream pop; psychedelic folk

=== May ===
Date	Album	Artist	Genre(s)
1	Attics to Eden	Madina Lake	Alternative rock; post-hardcore
4	Entertainment	Fischerspooner	Electropop; indie pop
4	Actor	St. Vincent	Baroque pop; indie pop
5	Reach for the Sun	The Dangerous Summer	Alternative rock; emo
5	Cause I Sez So	New York Dolls	Rock; garage rock
5	Stereo Rodeo	Rusted Root	Rock
5	Fight for Love	Elliott Yamin	Pop; R&B
12	Sewn Together	Meat Puppets	Psychedelic rock; alternative rock
15	Relapse	Eminem	Horrorcore; hip-hop
15	21st Century Breakdown	Green Day	Punk rock; pop-punk; arena rock; power pop; alternative rock
15	Manners	Passion Pit	Electropop; synth-pop; alternative rock
19	Back on My B.S.	Busta Rhymes	Hip-hop
19	So Glad I'm Me	LaKisha Jones	R&B; soul; inspirational
19	City of Black & White	Mat Kearney	Rock; Pop; acoustic
19	Blackout! 2	Method Man & Redman	Hip-hop
19	Love Is	Ruben Studdard	R&B
19	The Mirror Explodes	The Warlocks	Psychedelic rock
19	It's Frightening	White Rabbits	Indie rock; alternative rock; post-punk
20	The High End of Low	Marilyn Manson	Glam rock; hard rock; industrial rock
20	About Time (EP)	Straylight Run	Indie rock
26	Crash Kings	Crash Kings	Alternative rock; rock; hard rock
26	Veckatimest	Grizzly Bear	Indie pop; indie rock
26	Amanda Leigh	Mandy Moore	Country; folk; pop

=== June ===
Date	Album	Artist	Genre(s)
2	Uplifter	311	Alternative rock; reggae rock
2	Big Whiskey & the GrooGrux King	Dave Matthews Band	Alternative rock
2	Hombre Lobo	Eels	Rock; indie rock
2	Let the Dominoes Fall	Rancid	Punk rock; ska punk
2	New Again	Taking Back Sunday	Alternative rock; emo; pop-punk; post-hardcore
3	The E.N.D.	Black Eyed Peas	EDM; pop; hip-hop
9	The People or the Gun	Anti-Flag	Punk rock; hard rock
9	Restless Days	The Clarks	Rock; alternative rock
9	The Pariah, the Parrot, the Delusion	Dredg	Alternative rock; progressive rock
9	The Eternal	Sonic Youth	Indie rock
9	A Little Faster	There for Tomorrow	Alternative rock; emo; pop-punk
9	Bird-Brains	Tune-Yards	Art pop; indie pop
15	Spinnerette	Spinnerette	Alternative rock; rock; indie rock
16	Monuments and Melodies	Incubus	Alternative rock
16	Guns Don't Kill People... Lazers Do	Major Lazer	EDM; reggae; dancehall; funk
16	127 Rose Avenue	Hank Williams Jr.	Southern rock
19	Music for Men	Gossip	Indie pop; indie rock; dance-rock
22	Fits	White Denim	Psychedelic rock; garage rock; indie rock
23	It's Only Natural	The Higher	Pop rock; power pop
23	Varshons	The Lemonheads	Alternative rock
23	Octaheadron	The Mars Volta	Progressive rock; experimental rock
23	Far	Regina Spektor	Indie pop; indie rock
30	American Saturday Night	Brad Paisley	Country
30	Cradlesong	Rob Thomas	Pop rock; rock

=== July ===
Date	Album	Artist	Genre(s)
4	Leak at Will (EP)	Atmosphere	Hip-hop
7	Nothing Personal	All Time Low	Pop-punk; pop rock; alternative rock
7	Up from Below	Edward Sharpe and the Magnetic Zeros	Indie folk; indie pop; neo-psychedelia; indie rock
7	Leaving Wonderland... in a Fit of Rage	Marcy Playground	Alternative rock
7	BLACKsummers'night	Maxwell	Soul; R&B; neo soul; funk
7	Civilized	Stellastarr	Indie rock; post-punk
7	Life on Earth	Tiny Vipers	Indie rock; folk rock
14	Strange Cousins from the West	Clutch	Rock; hard rock
14	The Dandy Warhols Are Sound	The Dandy Warhols	Indie pop; new wave
14	Leave This Town	Daughtry	Post-grunge
14	Horehound	The Dead Weather	Blues rock; garage rock; alternative rock
14	Ocean Eyes	Owl City	Synth-pop; electropop; indie pop; pop rock
14	Picket Fence Cartel	Project 86	Alternative metal; post-hardcore
14	Lemons	Ty Segall	Garage rock; indie rock; lo-fi
21	Explains It All	Four Year Strong	Pop-punk; melodic hardcore
21	Sleepwalking	Memphis May Fire	Metalcore; Southern rock
21	The Satanic Satanist	Portugal. The Man	Psychedelic rock
21	Battlefield	Jordin Sparks	Pop; R&B
21	Music for Cougars	Sugar Ray	Pop rock; rock

=== August ===
Date	Album	Artist	Genre(s)
4	I Love You	Amanda Blank	Hip-hop; dirty rap; electropop
4	Gloriana	Gloriana	Country
4	Watch Me Fall	Jay Reatard	Garage rock; punk rock
4	No One's First, and You're Next (EP)	Modest Mouse	Indie rock; indie folk
4	Infomaniac	Nightmare of You	Indie rock
4	Julian Plenti Is... Skyscraper	Julian Plenti	Art rock; alternative rock; indie rock
4	...To the Beat of a Dead Horse	Touché Amoré	Melodic hardcore; post-hardcore
11	Hot Mess	Cobra Starship	Dance-pop; pop rock
11	Justin Moore	Justin Moore	Country
11	Twang	George Strait	Country
12	the Matches Album 4, Unreleased; Graphics? Title? Or Not Needed?	The Matches	Pop-punk; alternative rock
18	You Can't Take It with You	As Tall as Lions	Indie rock; alternative rock
18	Hello Fascination	Breathe Carolina	Electropop; alternative rock; post-hardcore
18	Armistice	Mutemath	Alternative rock; post-rock; Christian rock
18	Keep on Loving You	Reba McEntire	Country
18	Ursa Major	Third Eye Blind	Rock; alternative rock
19	Breakthrough	Colbie Caillat	Pop; pop rock
25	Collective Soul (Rabbit)	Collective Soul	Alternative rock; rock
25	World Wide Open	Love and Theft	Country
25	Light	Matisyahu	Reggae rock; alternative rock
25	The Outsiders	Needtobreathe	Alternative rock; Christian rock; Southern rock
25	Awake	Skillet	Alternative metal; Christian rock; hard rock
25	Into the Light	Phil Stacey	CCM; gospel
31	Before the Frost...Until the Freeze	The Black Crowes	Southern rock; rock
31	Sci-Fi Crimes	Chevelle	Alternative metal; rock; hard rock
31	Artwork	The Used	Alternative rock; emo; post-hardcore

=== September ===
Date	Album	Artist	Genre(s)
1	The Man I Want to Be	Chris Young	Country
4	Chase Park	Magnapop	Alternative rock; power pop
8	Love Drunk	Boys Like Girls	Pop rock; pop-punk
8	Bomb in a Birdcage	A Fine Frenzy	Indie pop
8	A Strange Arrangement	Mayer Hawthorne	Soul; neo soul
8	The Blueprint 3	Jay-Z	Hip-hop
8	The Visitor	Jim O'Rourke	Folk; orchestral pop; progressive rock
8	In Search of Solid Ground	Saosin	Post-hardcore; emo; alternative rock
9	High Times (EP)	Washed Out	Chillwave
15	The Chair in the Doorway	Living Colour	Funk metal; experimental rock; alternative metal; pop metal
15	Let's Be Friends	The Lovemakers	Electropop; alternative rock
15	Kamaal the Abstract	Q-Tip	Hip-hop; neo soul
15	Beggars	Thrice	Alternative rock; post-hardcore; experimental rock; art rock
16	Life of Leisure (EP)	Washed Out	Chillwave; synth-pop; indie pop
20	Backspacer	Pearl Jam	Alternative rock; rock; hard rock
22	Daisy	Brand New	Alternative rock; post-hardcore; emo
22	War Is the Answer	Five Finger Death Punch	Groove metal; alternative metal; hard rock
22	Album	Girls	Indie rock; indie pop; surf rock
22	Break Through the Silence	Monty Are I	Alternative rock
22	White Water, White Bloom	Sea Wolf	Indie rock; indie folk; alternative rock
22	Up and Down (EP)	She Wants Revenge	Dark wave
28	Year in the Kingdom	J. Tillman	Folk; folk rock
29	Crash Love	AFI	Alternative rock; punk rock; rock
29	Black Gives Way to Blue	Alice in Chains	Heavy metal; sludge metal; grunge
29	I and Love and You	The Avett Brothers	Folk rock; Americana
29	Dear Agony	Breaking Benjamin	Rock; hard rock; alternative metal
29	Skaboy JFK	Cherry Poppin' Daddies	Ska; ska punk
29	Revolution	Miranda Lambert	Country
29	Brand New Eyes	Paramore	Alternative rock; pop-punk; emo pop; emo
29	The G Files	Warren G	West Coast hip-hop

=== October ===
Date	Album	Artist	Genre(s)
6	Witness	Blessthefall	Metalcore; post-hardcore; alternative rock
6	Doin' My Thing	Luke Bryan	Country
6	In the Unlikely Event	The Fall of Troy	Post-hardcore; progressive rock
6	Wicked Wonderland	Lita Ford	Heavy metal; glam metal; hard rock
6	American Ride	Toby Keith	Country
6	Sonic Boom	Kiss	Hard rock; heavy metal
6	Heartbreak on Vinyl	Blake Lewis	Electropop; dance-pop
6	Anywhere but Here	Mayday Parade	Alternative rock; emo; pop-punk
6	Forget and Not Slow Down	Relient K	Alternative rock; pop-punk
13	Christmas from the Heart	David Archuleta	Christmas; pop
13	Beast Rest Forth Mouth	Bear in Heaven	Indie rock; indie pop; experimental rock
13	Sorry for Partyin'	Bowling for Soup	Pop-punk; punk rock
13	Out of Ashes	Dead by Sunrise	Alternative rock; alternative metal
13	Christmas in the Heart	Bob Dylan	Christmas
13	Embryonic	The Flaming Lips	Experimental rock
13	Psychic Chasms	Neon Indian	Electropop; chillwave; indie pop
13	On Your Side	A Rocket to the Moon	Pop rock; pop-punk
13	QU	Sherwood	Alternative rock; indie rock
13	Gold and Green	Sugarland	Christmas; country
13	Love Like This	The Summer Set	Pop-punk; emo; pop rock
19	Axe to Fall	Converge	Metalcore; hardcore punk
20	Cycles	Cartel	Alternative rock; pop rock; pop-punk
20	Picture Perfect	SOiL	Alternative metal; hard rock
20	Southern Voice	Tim McGraw	Country
23	Lovesick Electric	Hot Chelle Rae	Pop rock; dance-rock; pop-punk
26	You Gotta Believe (EP)	The Rocket Summer	Alternative rock
27	Congregation of the Damned	Atreyu	Metalcore; hard rock; post-hardcore
27	What Will We Be	Devendra Banhart	Folk; folk rock
27	Full Circle	Creed	Post-grunge; alternative metal; hard rock; Christian rock
27	Diamonds & Studs	Morningwood	Alternative rock; dance-rock; pop rock
30	Raditude	Weezer	Alternative rock; pop rock; power pop

=== November ===
Date	Album	Artist	Genre(s)
2	Phrazes for the Young	Julian Casablancas	Alternative rock; new wave; alternative dance
3	Monster Monster	The Almost	Pop-punk; alternative rock; emo
3	Picture Perfect	Every Avenue	Pop-punk; pop rock; alternative rock
3	Oh Blue Christmas (EP)	A Fine Frenzy	Christmas; pop rock
3	Greatest Hits	Foo Fighters	Alternative rock; rock
3	Say Anything	Say Anything	Alternative rock; pop-punk; emo
3	Play On	Carrie Underwood	Country pop
10	Alter the Ending	Dashboard Confessional	Alternative rock; emo
10	Memento Mori	Flyleaf	Alternative metal; alternative rock; hard rock
10	Hello Hurricane	Switchfoot	Alternative rock; rock
10	Christmas Like This	Ayiesha Woods	Christmas; contemporary Christian
13	Them Crooked Vultures	Them Crooked Vultures	Rock; hard rock; alternative rock
17	Believers Never Die – Greatest Hits	Fall Out Boy	Alternative rock; pop-punk; emo
17	Kris Allen	Kris Allen	Pop rock; alternative rock
23	For Your Entertainment	Adam Lambert	Pop; pop rock; dance-pop
23	Unexpected	Angie Stone	R&B; dance-pop

=== December ===
Date	Album	Artist	Genre(s)
1	Stir the Blood	The Bravery	Alternative rock; post-punk
1	Just like You	Allison Iraheta	Pop rock; teen pop
7	The Circles (EP)	As Tall as Lions	Indie rock
8	Graffiti	Chris Brown	R&B
8	Pin Points and Gin Joints	The Mighty Mighty Bosstones	Ska punk
8	Volume 4: Songs in the Key of Love & Hate	Puddle of Mudd	Post-grunge; alternative rock; rock
8	This Is War	Thirty Seconds to Mars	Alternative rock; progressive rock; experimental rock; indie rock
8	Smile Kid	We the Kings	Pop-punk; pop rock
11	The Element of Freedom	Alicia Keys	R&B; pop; soul
22	Christmas EP	The Fray	Christmas; acoustic folk
29	Twenty One Pilots	Twenty One Pilots	Emo; alternative hip-hop; soft rock; indie pop; chamber pop

== Best-selling albums in the U.S. ==
The best-selling records in 2009 in the US according to Nielsen Soundscan:

Position	Album title	Artist
1	Fearless	Taylor Swift
2	I Dreamed a Dream	Susan Boyle
3	Number Ones	Michael Jackson
4	The Fame	Lady Gaga
5	My Christmas	Andrea Bocelli
6	Hannah Montana: The Movie	Hannah Montana
7	The E.N.D.	The Black Eyed Peas
8	Relapse	Eminem
9	The Blueprint 3	Jay-Z
10	Only by the Night	Kings of Leon

== Top songs on record ==
=== Billboard Hot 100 No. 1 Songs ===
- "3" – Britney Spears (1 week)
- "Boom Boom Pow" – The Black Eyed Peas (12 weeks)
- "Crack a Bottle" – Eminem featuring Dr. Dre and 50 Cent (1 week)
- "Down" – Jay Sean featuring Lil Wayne (2 weeks)
- "Empire State of Mind" – Jay-Z featuring Alicia Keys (5 weeks)
- "Fireflies" – Owl City (2 weeks)
- "I Gotta Feeling" – The Black Eyed Peas (14 weeks)
- "Just Dance" – Lady Gaga featuring Colby O'Donis (3 weeks)
- "My Life Would Suck Without You" – Kelly Clarkson (2 weeks)
- "Poker Face" – Lady Gaga (1 week)
- "Right Round" – Flo Rida featuring Ke$ha (6 weeks)
- "Single Ladies (Put a Ring on It)" – Beyoncé (2 weeks in 2008, 2 weeks in 2009)
- "Whatcha Say" – Jason Derülo (1 week)

=== Billboard Hot 100 Top 20 Hits ===
- "Already Gone" – Kelly Clarkson (#13)
- "Bad Romance" – Lady Gaga (#2)
- "Battlefield" – Jordin Sparks (#10)
- "Be on You" – Flo Rida featuring Ne-Yo (#19)
- "Beautiful" – Akon featuring Kardinal Offishall and Colby O'Donis (#19)
- "Beautiful" – Eminem (#17)
- "BedRock" – Young Money featuring Lloyd (#2)
- "Best I Ever Had" – Drake (#2)
- "Big Green Tractor" – Jason Aldean (#18)
- "Birthday Sex" – Jeremih (#4)
- "Blame It" – Jamie Foxx featuring T-Pain (#2)
- "Break Up" – Mario featuring Gucci Mane and Sean Garrett (#14)
- "Chicken Fried" – Zac Brown Band (#20)
- "Circus" – Britney Spears (#9 in 2009, #3 in 2008)
- "The Climb" – Miley Cyrus (#4)
- "Cowboy Casanova" – Carrie Underwood (#11)
- "Crazier" – Taylor Swift (#17)
- "Day 'n' Nite" – Kid Cudi (#3)
- "Dead and Gone" – T.I. featuring Justin Timberlake (#2)
- "Disturbia" – Rihanna (#19 in 2009, #1 in 2008)
- "Diva" – Beyoncé (#19)
- "Do You Remember" – Jay Sean featuring Sean Paul and Lil Jon (#10)
- "Don't Stop Believin'" – Glee Cast (#4)
- "Don't Trust Me" – 3OH!3 (#7)
- "Every Girl" – Young Money (#10)
- "Fallin' for You" – Colbie Caillat (#12)
- "Fire Burning" – Sean Kingston (#5)
- "Forever" – Drake featuring Kanye West, Lil Wayne, and Eminem (#8)
- "Gives You Hell" – The All-American Rejects (#4)
- "Good Girls Go Bad" – Cobra Starship featuring Leighton Meester (#7)
- "Goodbye" – Kristinia DeBarge (#15)
- "Gotta Be Somebody" – Nickelback (#16 in 2009, #10 in 2008)
- "Halo" – Beyoncé (#5)
- "Hard" – Rihanna featuring Jeezy (#8)
- "He Could Be the One" – Hannah Montana (#10)
- "Heartless" – Kanye West (#2)
- "Heartless" – Kris Allen (#16)
- "Here Comes Goodbye" – Rascal Flatts (#11)
- "Here We Go Again" – Demi Lovato (#15)
- "Hoedown Throwdown" – Miley Cyrus (#18)
- "Hot n Cold" – Katy Perry (#6 in 2009, #3 in 2008)
- "Hotel Room Service" – Pitbull (#8)
- "How Low" – Ludacris (#13)
- "I Can Transform Ya" – Chris Brown featuring Lil Wayne and Swizz Beatz (#20)
- "I Do Not Hook Up" – Kelly Clarkson (#20)
- "I Hate This Part" – The Pussycat Dolls (#11)
- "I Know You Want Me (Calle Ocho)" – Pitbull (#2)
- "I Love College" – Asher Roth (#12)
- "I Told You So" – Carrie Underwood featuring Randy Travis (#9)
- "If I Were a Boy" – Beyoncé (#10 in 2009, #3 in 2008)
- "If Today Was Your Last Day" – Nickelback (#19)
- "If U Seek Amy" – Britney Spears (#19)
- "I'm Yours" – Jason Mraz (#6)
- "Jump Then Fall" – Taylor Swift (#10)
- "Kiss a Girl" – Keith Urban (#16)
- "Kiss Me thru the Phone" – Soulja Boy Tell 'Em featuring Sammie (#3)
- "Knock You Down" – Keri Hilson featuring Kanye West and Ne-Yo (#3)
- "Let It Rock" – Kevin Rudolf featuring Lil Wayne (#5)
- "Live Like We're Dying" – Kris Allen (#18)
- "Live Your Life" – T.I. featuring Rihanna (#2 in 2009, #1 in 2008)
- "Love Lockdown" – Kanye West (#8 in 2009, #3 in 2008)
- "Love Sex Magic" – Ciara featuring Justin Timberlake (#10)
- "Love Story" – Taylor Swift (#4)
- "LoveGame" – Lady Gaga (#5)
- "Mad" – Ne-Yo (#11)
- "Mad World" – Adam Lambert (#19)
- "Meet Me Halfway" – The Black Eyed Peas (#7)
- "Miss Independent" – Ne-Yo (#14 in 2009, #7 in 2008)
- "Need You Now" – Lady Antebellum (#5 in 2009, #2 in 2010)
- "New Divide" – Linkin Park (#6)
- "No Boundaries" – Kris Allen (#11)
- "No Surprise" – Daughtry (#15)
- "Obsessed" – Mariah Carey (#7)
- "One Less Lonely Girl" – Justin Bieber (#16)
- "One Time" – Justin Bieber (#17)
- "Out Last Night" – Kenny Chesney (#16)
- "Paparazzi" – Lady Gaga (#6)
- "Party in the U.S.A." – Miley Cyrus (#2)
- "Please Don't Leave Me" – Pink (#17)
- "Prom Queen" – Lil Wayne (#15)
- "Rehab" – Rihanna (#18)
- "Replay" – Iyaz (#2)
- "Resistance" – Muse (#24)
- "Right Now (Na Na Na)" – Akon (#8)
- "Run This Town" – Jay-Z featuring Rihanna and Kanye West (#2)
- "Russian Roulette" – Rihanna (#9)
- "Say Hey (I Love You)" – Michael Franti & Spearhead featuring Cherine Anderson (#18)
- "Second Chance" – Shinedown (#7)
- "Send It On" – Demi Lovato, Jonas Brothers, Miley Cyrus, and Selena Gomez (#20)
- "Sexy Chick" – David Guetta feat. Akon (#12)
- "She Wolf" – Shakira (#11)
- "So What" – Pink (#14 in 2009, #1 in 2008)
- "Sober" – Pink (#15)
- "Sugar" – Flo Rida featuring Wynter (#5)
- "Sweet Dreams" – Beyoncé (#10)
- "Throw It in the Bag" – Fabolous featuring The-Dream (#14)
- "Tik Tok – Ke$ha (#1)
- "Turn My Swag On" – Soulja Boy Tell 'Em (#19)
- "Turnin Me On" – Keri Hilson featuring Lil Wayne (#15)
- "Untouchable" – Taylor Swift (#19)
- "Untouched" – The Veronicas (#17)
- "Use Somebody"- Kings of Leon (#4)
- "Waking Up in Vegas" – Katy Perry (#9)
- "We Made You" – Eminem (#9)
- "Whataya Want from Me" – Adam Lambert (#10)
- "Whatever You Like" – T.I. (#9 in 2009, #1 in 2008)
- "Who Says" – John Mayer (#17)
- "Womanizer" – Britney Spears (#5 in 2009, #1 in 2008)
- "You Belong with Me" – Taylor Swift (#2)
- "You Found Me" – The Fray (#7)

Billboard Year-End Hot 100 singles of 2009

== Deaths ==
- January 6 – Ron Asheton, 60, guitarist (heart attack)
- January 28 – Billy Powell, 56, keyboardist (Lynyrd Skynyrd)
- February 1 – Lukas Foss, 86, pianist, conductor and composer
- February 2 – Sunny Skylar, 95, songwriter
- February 3 – Tom Brumley, 73, steel guitarist (The Buckaroos)
- February 4 – Lux Interior, 62, singer (The Cramps)
- February 7 – Blossom Dearie, 82, jazz singer and pianist
- February 11 – Estelle Bennett, 67, singer (The Ronettes)
- February 12
  - Coleman Mellett, 34, guitarist
  - Gerry Niewood, 65, jazz saxophonist
- February 14
  - Louie Bellson, 84, jazz drummer
  - John McGlinn, 55, conductor and historian of musicals
- February 18 – Snooks Eaglin, 72, guitarist and singer
- February 24 – Pearl Lang, 87, dancer and choreographer
- February 25 – Randall Bewley, 53, guitarist (Pylon)
- March 2 – Ernie Ashworth, 80, country singer
- March 3 – Sydney Earle Chaplin, 82, actor and singer
- March 4 – John Cephas, 78, Piedmont blues guitarist
- March 7 – Jimmy Boyd, 70, singer
- March 18 – Kent Henry, 60, blues/rock guitarist
- March 24 – Uriel Jones, 74, Motown Funk Brothers session drummer
- March 25 – "England" Dan Seals, 61, singer-songwriter (mantle cell lymphoma)
- April 9 – Randy Cain, 63, singer, (The Delfonics)
- April 13 – Ron Stallings, saxophonist (Huey Lewis and the News)
- May 6 – Ean Evans, 48, bass guitarist
- May 15 – Wayman Tisdale, 44, NBA basketball player and smooth jazz bass guitarist
- May 18
  - Wayne Allwine, 62, voice artist (Mickey Mouse)
  - Roderick "Dolla" Burton II, 21, rapper
- May 24 – Jay Bennett, 45, multi-instrumentalist (Wilco)
- June 3 – Koko Taylor, 80, blues singer
- June 7 – Kenny Rankin, 69, pop and jazz musician
- June 14 – Bob Bogle, 75, guitarist (The Ventures)
- June 25
  - Michael Jackson, 50, entertainer
  - Farrah Fawcett, 62, actress
  - Sky Saxon, 63, rock singer and bass guitarist (The Seeds)
- June 27 – Fayette Pinkney, 61, singer (The Three Degrees)
- June 30 – Harve Presnell, 75, singer and actor
- July 4
  - Jim Chapin, drummer, 89
  - Allen Klein, 77, record label executive
  - Drake Levin, 62, guitarist (Paul Revere & the Raiders)
- July 8 – Midnight, 47, singer-songwriter (Crimson Glory)
- July 27 – George Russell, 86, composer
- July 31 – Titus "Baatin" Glover, 61, singer (Slum Village)
- August 6 – Willy DeVille, 58, musician
- August 12 – Rashied Ali, 74, drummer
- August 13 – Les Paul, 94, jazz guitarist and inventor of solid-body electric guitar and multi-track recording
- August 14 – Gates Nichols, 65, steel guitarist (Confederate Railroad)
- August 28 – DJ AM, 36, turntabalist and celebrity disc jockey (Crazy Town)
- September 1 – Erich Kunzel, 74, conductor
- September 11 – Jim Carroll, 60, writer and punk singer (Jim Carroll Band)
- September 16 – Mary Travers, 72, folk singer (Peter, Paul and Mary)
- September 17 – Leon Kirchner, 90, composer
- September 19 – Roc Raida, 37, turntablist (The X-Ecutioners)
- October 7 – Steve Ferguson, 60, rock guitarist (NRBQ)
- October 13 – Al Martino, 82, singer
- October 17 – Vic Mizzy, 93, composer
- November 8 – Jerry Fuchs, 34, drummer (!!!, Maserati)
- December 20 – James Gurley, 69, musician (Big Brother and the Holding Company)
- December 25 – Vic Chesnutt, 45, musician
- December 28 – James "The Rev" Sullivan, 28, drummer (Avenged Sevenfold)

== See also ==
- 2000s in music
- 2009 in American television
