= J-Kwon discography =

- Studio albums: 4
- Singles: 9
- Music videos: 3
- Mixtapes: 1
- Remix albums: 1

The discography of J-Kwon, an American rapper, consists of four studio albums, one remix album, one mixtape, three music videos, and nine singles (including one as a featured artist).

== Albums ==
=== Studio albums ===
List of albums, with selected chart positions and certifications
Title	Album details	Peak chart positions				Certifications
Title	Album details	US	US R&B	US Rap	UK	Certifications
Hood Hop	Released: April 6, 2004; Label: So So Def, Arista; Format: CD, LP, digital download	7	4	—	84	RIAA: Gold
Hood Hop 2	Released: February 17, 2009; Label: Hood Hop; Format: digital download	—	—	—	—	
Hood Hop 2.5	Released: July 28, 2009; Label: Hood Hop, Gracie, EMI; Format: CD, LP, digital download	—	60	23	—	
J-Kwon	Released: March 23, 2010; Label: Hood Hop, Gracie, ONE; Format: CD, LP, digital download	—	—	—	—	
"—" denotes a recording that did not chart or was not released in that territory.

=== Remix albums ===
List of albums, showing year released
Title	Album details
The Tipsy Remixes	Released: June 15, 2010; Label: Hood Hop; Format: digital download

=== Mixtapes ===
List of mixtapes, showing year released
Title	Album details
Celebration of Life	Released: May 19, 2011; Format: digital download
Remember Me	Released: June 5, 2015; Format: digital download

== Singles ==
=== As lead artist ===
List of singles, with selected chart positions and certifications, showing year released and album name
Title	Year	Peak chart positions										Certifications	Album
Title	Year	US	US R&B	US Rap	AUS	BEL (FL)	GER	IRE	NL	NZ	UK	Certifications	Album
"Tipsy"	2004	2	2	1	5	24	17	8	23	9	4	RIAA: Gold; ARIA: Platinum; BPI: Gold	Hood Hop
"You & Me" (featuring Sadiyyah)	2004	58	70	21	—	—	—	—	—	—	—		Hood Hop
"Hood Hop"	2004	—	52	—	—	—	—	—	—	—	—		Hood Hop
"Get XXX'd" (featuring Ebony Eyez and Petey Pablo)	2005	—	95	—	—	—	—	—	—	—	—		xXx: State of the Union soundtrack
"Boo-Boo (Holdin' Me Down)"	2008	—	—	—	—	—	—	—	—	—	—		Hood Hop 2
"Fly"	2009	—	—	—	—	—	—	—	—	—	—		Hood Hop 2.5
"Louie Bounce (I Smacked Nikki)" (featuring Gino Green)	2009	—	—	—	—	—	—	—	—	—	—		Hood Hop 2.5
"—" denotes a recording that did not chart or was not released in that territory.

=== As featured performer ===
List of singles, with selected chart positions and certifications, showing year released and album name
Title	Year	Peak chart positions			Certifications	Album
Title	Year	US	US R&B	US Rap	Certifications	Album
"Fresh Azimiz" (Bow Wow featuring J-Kwon and Jermaine Dupri)	2005	23	13	6	RIAA: Gold	Wanted

== Guest appearances ==
List of guest appearances, with other performing artists, showing year released and album name
Title	Year	Other performer(s)	Album
"Ima Pimp"	2004	Rob Gold	Windows 2 a Soul
"Shorty"	2004	O'Ryan	O'Ryan
"Fresh Azimiz"	2005	Bow Wow, Jermaine Dupri	Wanted
"10 Toes"	2005	Jermaine Dupri, The Kid Slim, Daz Dillinger, Stat Quo	Young, Fly & Flashy, Vol. 1
"Look at Me Shinin'"	2006	—N/a	Step Up (Original Soundtrack)
"In the Hood"	2007	Chain Gang Parolees	The Game
"We Came to Party"	2007	—N/a	Nancy Drew soundtrack

== Music videos ==
List of music videos, with directors, showing year released
Title	Year	Director(s)
"Tipsy"	2004	Life Garland
"Hood Hop"	2004	Jermaine Dupri
"Get XXX'd"	2005	Benny Boom
"Louie Bounce (I Smacked Nikki)"	2009	Bizzy B
"O"	2010	J-Kwon
