= Trackboyz =

American hip hop production team

- Origin: St. Louis, Missouri, U.S.
- Genres: Hip hop
- Occupation: Producers
- Years active: 2002–present
- Label: Def Jam
- Members: Mark "Tarboy" Williams; Joe "Capo" Kent; Travis "Tizzle" Miller; Marlon "Tracmajor" Byrd; Rodrick "PubG" Finch; DJ D-Rocc

The Trackboyz are an American hip hop production team consisting of Mark "Tarboy" Williams, Joe "Capo" Kent, DJ D-Rocc, Jermaine White, Travis "Tizzle" Miller, Marlon "Tracmajor" Byrd and Rodrick "PubG" Finch from St. Louis, Missouri. The hits that they have engineered include Nelly's "Air Force Ones" (number 3 on the Billboard Hot 100), D12's 40 Oz., Nappy Roots "Po' Folks" (number 21) and J-Kwon's "Tipsy" (number 2). The Trackboyz signed with Def Jam Records. They recently worked on the song "Hips" by Adina Howard, a track from her album Private Show.

== Partial production discography ==
Year	Single	Peak positions		Album
Year	Single	US	UK	Album
2002	"You Suella" (performed by Pretty Willie)	—	—	Enter the Life of Suella
2002	"Air Force Ones" (performed by St. Lunatics)	3	—	Nellyville
2002	"Breathe in, Breathe Out" (performed by St. Lunatics)	—	—	Music from the Motion Picture Bad Company
2002	"Po' Folks" (performed by Nappy Roots and Anthony Hamilton)	21	—	Watermelon, Chicken & Gritz
2002	"Start It Over" (performed by Nappy Roots)	—	—	Watermelon, Chicken & Gritz
2003	"Favourite Things" (Trackboyz Remix) (performed by Big Brovaz)	—	—	Nu-Flow
2003	"Hustle" (performed by Youngbloodz and Killer Mike)	—	—	Drankin' Patnaz
2003	"Lean Low" (performed by Youngbloodz and Backbone)	—	—	Drankin' Patnaz
2004	"Hood Hop" (performed by J-Kwon)	—	—	Hood Hop
2004	"Tipsy" (performed by J-Kwon)	2	4	Hood Hop
2004	"You & Me" (performed by J-Kwon and Sadiyyah)	—	—	Hood Hop
2004	"40 Oz." (performed by Bizarre, Eminem, Kuniva and Proof)	—	—	D12 World
2004	"Weight a Minute" (performed by Shawnna)	—	—	Worth tha Weight
2005	"La La" (performed by Teairra Marí)	—	—	Roc-A-Fella Records Presents Teairra Marí
2005	"Get XXX'd" (performed by J-Kwon, Petey Pablo and Ebony Eyez)	—	—	×X×: State of the Union (Music from the Motion Picture)
"—" denotes releases that did not chart or were not released.
