= Fresh Azimiz =

Single by Bow Wow featuring J-Kwon and Jermaine Dupri

from the album Wanted
- Released: October 1, 2005
- Recorded: 2005
- Genre: Hip-hop
- Length: 4:31 (album version); 3:50 (radio edit)
- Label: Columbia
- Songwriters: Jermaine Mauldin; James Phillips
- Producers: Jermaine Dupri; LRoc

Bow Wow singles chronology
"I Think They Like Me (Remix)" (2005)	"Fresh Azimiz" (2005)	"Shortie Like Mine" (2006)

J-Kwon singles chronology
"Hood Hop" (2004)	"Fresh Azimiz" (2005)	"Boo-Boo (Holdin' Me Down)" (2008)

Jermaine Dupri singles chronology
"Get Your Number" (2005)	"Fresh Azimiz" (2005)	"Dem Jeans" (2006)

"Fresh Azimiz" ("fresh as I'm is") is a single by rapper Bow Wow from his fourth studio album Wanted. It is the third song after his singles "Let Me Hold You" and "Like You". It features J-Kwon and Jermaine Dupri. The song was produced by Dupri and LRoc. The song became his third Top 40 single from his 2005 album Wanted, peaking at number 23 on the Billboard Hot 100.

Although released through Columbia Records, the lyrics on the 2nd verse of the original song explains that Bow Wow still has close ties to So So Def Recordings ("Records say Columbia, but I'm So So man").

== Rumored diss to Romeo ==
Rumors circulated that the song was meant to attack rapper Lil' Romeo, with the line, "18 nigga, making more than your Dad see." The line in question is actually borrowed from LL Cool J's song, "The Do Wop" on the classic album Bigger and Deffer. Bow Wow later confirmed that the line was not aimed at Miller's father, Master P or Miller himself. Because of that, Romeo dedicated the song of God's Gift entitled "U Can't Shine Like Me" with the line "You a Mama's boy I'm a son of a hustler".

== Live performance ==
On April 1, 2006, Bow Wow performed "Fresh Azimiz" at the 2006 Kids' Choice Awards as part of a musical duel with singer Chris Brown that was inspired by the 1986 Run-D.M.C. music video "Walk This Way".

== Remix ==
A remix of this song features rapper Mike Jones, replacing Bow Wow's 2nd verse. There is a video for the remix, with additional scenes with Bow Wow & Jones throughout the video and Bow Wow's verse removed and Mike Jones' instead comes in and raps. Jones also makes an appearance on the original version's video.

== Charts ==
=== Weekly charts ===
Chart (2005–2006)	Peak position
US Billboard Hot 100	23
US Hot R&B/Hip-Hop Songs (Billboard)	13
US Hot Rap Songs (Billboard)	6
US Rhythmic Airplay (Billboard)	11

=== Year-end charts ===
Chart (2006)	Position
US Hot R&B/Hip-Hop Songs (Billboard)	58

== Certifications ==
Region	Certification	Certified units/sales
United States (RIAA)	Gold	500,000^{*}
United States (RIAA) Mastertone	Gold	500,000^{*}
^{*} Sales figures based on certification alone.

== Release history ==
Release dates and formats for "Fresh Azimiz"
Region	Date	Format	Label(s)	Ref.
United States	March 7, 2006	Mainstream airplay	Columbia	
