= XXX: State of the Union (soundtrack) =

2005 soundtrack album by various artists

XXX: State of the Union (Music from the Motion Picture)

Soundtrack album by Various artists
- Released: April 26, 2005
- Genre: Hip hop
- Length: 1:01:20
- Label: Jive
- Producers: Darren Higman; Denise Luiso; Jonathan McHugh; Laura Z. Wasserman; Lee Tamahori; Neal H. Moritz; Maestro; The Trackboyz; B.Slade; DJ Rated R; Gavin Brown; Hallway Productionz; Hush; Jonathan Davis; Josh Abraham; Lil' Jon; Organized Noize; P.O.D.; Timbaland; Velvet Revolver; Warren G; Brian Stanley; Greg Fidelman; Randy Lynch; Scott Sumner

Singles from XXX State of the Union
- 1. "MKLVFKWR" Released: July 2, 2004; 2. "Dirty Little Thing" Released: September 20, 2004; 3. "Get XXX'd" Released: 2005

Professional ratings
Review scores
Source	Rating
AllMusic	3/5 stars

XXX: State of the Union (Music from the Motion Picture) is the soundtrack to Lee Tamahori's 2005 action film XXX: State of the Union. It was released on April 26, 2005 via Jive Records, and consists of hip hop and alternative/hard rock music. The album peaked at #40 in New Zealand, #71 in Germany, #92 in Switzerland, and #117 in the United States. Its lead single "Get XXX'd" reached #95 on the Hot R&B/Hip-Hop Songs chart in the US.

== Track listing ==
No.	Title	Writer(s)	Producer(s)	Length
1.	"Get XXX'd" (performed by J-Kwon, Petey Pablo & Ebony Eyez)	J. Jones; M. Barrett; E. Williams; J. Kent; M. Williams	The Trackboyz	3:54
2.	"Anybody Seen the PoPo's?!" (performed by Ice Cube)	O. Jackson Sr.; T. Underdue; D. Lopez	Hallway Productionz	3:58
3.	"Fight the Power" (performed by KoЯn & Xzibit)	C. Ridenhour; E. Sadler; K. Boxley	Lil' Jon; Jonathan Davis	3:30
4.	"Messiah" (performed by Dead Celebrity Status)	B. McIntosh; Y. Taalat; B. West; C. Hunter; G. Eaton; J. McCollum; J. Levine; J. Dalziel; J. Levine		4:00
5.	"Oh No" (performed by Big Boi, Killer Mike & Bubba Sparxxx)	A. Patton; M. Render; W. Mathis; P. Brown; R. Murray; R. Wade; J. Williams; G. Morton	Organized Noize	3:40
6.	"The Payback" (performed by P.O.D.)	J. Truby; P.O.D.	P.O.D.; Greg Fidelman (co.)	2:50
7.	"Dirty Little Thing" (performed by Velvet Revolver)	S. Weiland; S. Hudson; D. McKagan; M. Sorum; K. Nelson	Josh Abraham; Velvet Revolver	3:57
8.	"Wyle Out" (performed by Bone Crusher)	W. Hardnett; V. Brooks	Maestro	3:38
9.	"Here We Go" (performed by Dirtbag)	J. James; T. Mosley	Timbaland	3:41
10.	"Dis Dat Block" (performed by YoungBloodZ)	J. Grigsby; S. Joseph; J. Kent; M. Williams	The Trackboyz	3:36
11.	"Lookin' for U" (performed by Chingy & G.I.B.)	H. Bailey; C. Bowers; K. Simms; W. Griffin III	Warren G	4:19
12.	"The March" (performed by Hush)	D. Carlisle; M. Martinez; R. Lynch; S. Sumner	Hush; Randy Lynch (co.); Scott Sumner (co.)	3:28
13.	"MKLVFKWR" (performed by Moby & Public Enemy)	C. Ridenhour; R. Hall; W. Drayton		3:22
14.	"Just Like Wylin'" (performed by Bone Crusher & Three Days Grace)	W. Hardnett; V. Brooks; G. Brown; Three Days Grace	Gavin "Golden" Brown; Maestro	3:07
15.	"Did It Again" (performed by Labba)	R. Edwards; D. Ford; N. Bey; B. Stanley	Rated R; Brian Stanley (co.)	2:52
16.	"The Good Song" (performed by Tonéx)	A. Williams II	T. Boy	4:56
Total length:				1:01:20

Notes

- Track 5 contains a sample of "Remember (Walking in the Sand)" written by Shadow Morton and performed by The Shangri-Las
- Track 6 does not appear in the film

=== Other songs ===
The following songs did appear in the film, but were not included in the soundtrack album

- "As the World Turns", written by Tupac Shakur, Darrell "Big D" Harper, Mutah Beale, Rufus Cooper, Yafeu Fula, Malcolm Greenidge and Bruce Washington, and performed by Outlawz
- "I Play You Lose", written by Dwayne Artess Morgan and Brian Yalskulka, and performed by the Grusomes and Tezz
- "Victory", written by Tonči Huljić, and performed by Bond
- "Two Sisters of Mystery", written by Neftali Santiago, and performed by Planet People Movement
- "State of the Union", written by Julian Bunetta and Peter Bunetta, and performed by Peter Bunetta

== Personnel ==
- Chaz Harper – mastering
- Nick Gamma – art direction
- Mickey Wright – A&R direction

== Charts ==
Chart (2005)	Peak position
German Albums (Offizielle Top 100)	71
New Zealand Albums (RMNZ)	40
Swiss Albums (Schweizer Hitparade)	92
US Billboard 200	117
US Top R&B/Hip-Hop Albums (Billboard)	48
US Top Soundtracks (Billboard)	5
