= Wanted (Bow Wow album) =

Studio album by Bow Wow
- Released: July 12, 2005
- Recorded: 2004–05
- Genre: Hip hop
- Length: 47:09
- Labels: Columbia; Sony Urban
- Producers: Jermaine Dupri (also exec.); Bow Wow; LRoc; Bryan Michael Cox; No I.D.; Lil Ronnie

Bow Wow chronology
Unleashed (2003)	Wanted (2005)	The Price of Fame (2006)

Singles from Wanted
- 1. "Let Me Hold You" Released: March 11, 2005; 2. "Like You" Released: August 6, 2005; 3. "Fresh Azimiz" Released: November 1, 2005

Wanted is the fourth studio album by American rapper Bow Wow. The album was released on July 12, 2005, by Columbia Records and Sony Urban Music. The production of the album was primarily handled by Bow Wow's long-time producer Jermaine Dupri (who also executive produced the album), Bow Wow, Lil Ronnie, LRoc, Bryan Michael Cox and No I.D. The album also features guest appearances by Omarion, Snoop Dogg, Ciara among others. This was Bow Wow's first album to contain uncensored profanity, although it did not receive a Parental Advisory label.

Wanted was supported by three singles: "Let Me Hold You" featuring singer Omarion, "Like You" featuring Ciara, and "Fresh Azimiz" featuring J-Kwon and Jermaine Dupri. "Big Dreams", the remix to "Fresh Azimiz" featuring Mike Jones and "Caviar" featuring Snoop Dogg, were service as an accompanying music videos. Clean versions of "Fresh Azimiz" and "Let Me Hold You" were recorded. The album received mixed to positive reviews from music critics and was commercially successful, debuting at number three on the US Billboard 200 chart, selling 120,000 copies in the first week, and eventually being certified platinum by the Recording Industry Association of America (RIAA) in September 2005.

== Critical reception ==
Professional ratings
Review scores
Source	Rating
AllMusic	3/5 stars
Blender	1/5 stars
Entertainment Weekly	(mixed)
People	2.5/4 stars
RapReviews	(4.5/10)
USA Today	2.5/4 stars
Vibe	2.5/5 stars

The album received mixed to favorable reviews from music critics. Steve Jones of USA Today found some change in Bow Wow and his music, concluding with "This album doesn't break any new ground but marks the coming of age of a likable artist." David Jeffries of AllMusic praised Bow Wow for his charisma throughout the album, despite its B-level beats and that its marketing towards a teen demographic. He concluded that "At the very least, it's an interesting way to develop a child star into an adult star, and a hook-filled one at that." Angie Romero of Vibe highlighted the first two singles off the album but found everything else to be lackluster, saying "The rest of Wanted finds him struggling to carve his niche as a grown rapper minus the Bow Wow bounce. Matt Jost of RapReviews gave a mixed review, criticizing the generic production from Jermaine Dupri and finding Bow Wow to be unspectacular in the material given to him. He concluded by saying, "With Wanted, he's still 'in transition', chances for a turnaround are still intact, but the way things are looking Bow Wow is speeding down a dead-end street."

== Commercial performance ==
Wanted debuted and peaked at number three on the US Billboard 200 chart, selling 120,000 copies in the first week., and becoming Bow Wow's third US top-ten album. In its second week, the album dropped to number five on the chart, selling an additional 61,000 copies. In its fifth week, the album returned to the top-ten at number ten, selling 51,000 copies. On December 19, 2005, the album was certified platinum by the Recording Industry Association of America (RIAA) for selling over a million copies. As of March 2006, the album has sold 958,000 copies in the United States.

== Track listing ==
No.	Title	Writer(s)	Producer(s)	Length
1.	"Do You"	Jaron Alston; Jermaine Dupri; James Phillips	Dupri; LRoc^{[a]}	3:32
2.	"Big Dreams"	Dupri; Shawntae Harris; Phillips	Dupri; LRoc^{[a]}	3:34
3.	"Let Me Hold You" (featuring Omarion)	Dupri; Brenda Russell; Ernest Wilson	No I.D.; Dupri^{[a]}	4:10
4.	"Fresh Azimiz" (featuring Jermaine Dupri & J-Kwon)	Dupri; Phillips	Dupri; LRoc^{[a]}	4:32
5.	"Caviar" (featuring Snoop Dogg)	Jaron Alston; Calvin Broadus; Dupri; Phillips	Dupri; LRoc^{[a]}	3:44
6.	"Like You" (featuring Ciara)	Jaron Alston; Johntá Austin; Ricky Bell; Dupri; Ralph Tresvant	Bryan-Michael Cox; Dupri^{[a]}	3:27
7.	"B.O.W."	Shad Moss; Jaron Alston; Ronnie Jackson	Bow Wow, Lil Ronnie	3:35
8.	"Go" (featuring Jermaine Dupri)	Cox; Dupri; McKinley Jackson; Robert Simpson; Melvin Steals; Howard Thompson	Cox; Dupri^{[a]}	4:24
9.	"Do What It Do" (featuring Jermaine Dupri)	Dupri; Phillips	Dupri; LRoc^{[a]}	3:06
10.	"Is That You (P.Y.T.)"	Dupri; James Ingram; Quincy Jones; Phillips	Dupri; LRoc^{[a]}	3:57
11.	"Mo Money" (featuring T. Waters)	Dupri; Phillips; Anthony T. Waters	Dupri; LRoc^{[a]}	9:08

Notes

- ^{^[a]} signifies a co-producer.
- "Is That You (P.Y.T.)" features additional vocals by Johntá Austin.
- "Mo Money" is actually 4 minutes and 5 seconds long. The additional 5 minutes at the end of song is a nearly 15-second pause that then leads to the track "Eighteen", taken from Bow Wow's Unleashed album. "Eighteen" was included at the end of "Mo Money" as a hidden bonus track to symbolize Bow Wow turning 18 by the time of the album's release.

Sample credits

- "Let Me Hold You" samples "If Only for One Night" performed by Luther Vandross, originally performed by Brenda Russell, and written by Brenda Russell.
- "Like You" samples "I'm Leaving You Again" performed by New Edition, and written by Ricky Bell and Ralph Tresvant.
- "Go" samples "Treat 'em Right" performed by Chubb Rock, and written McKinley Jackson, Robert Simpson, Melvin Steals and Howard Thompson.
- "Is That You (P.Y.T.)" samples "P.Y.T. (Pretty Young Thing)" performed by Michael Jackson, and written by James Ingram and Quincy Jones.

== Wanted Reloaded (DualDisc) ==
The CD side of the disc contains the original 11 tracks.

DVD side

1. "Do You" (enhanced stereo)
2. "Big Dreams" (enhanced stereo)
3. "Let Me Hold You" (enhanced stereo)
4. "Fresh Azimiz" (enhanced stereo)
5. "Caviar" (enhanced stereo)
6. "Like You" (enhanced stereo)
7. "B.O.W." (enhanced stereo)
8. "Go" (enhanced stereo)
9. "Do What It Do" (enhanced stereo)
10. "Is That You (P.Y.T.)" (enhanced stereo)
11. "Mo Money" (enhanced stereo)
12. "Like You" (Behind-The-Scenes Footage)
13. "Let Me Hold You" (Direct Your Own Video)
14. "Let Me Hold You" (music video)
15. "Like You" (music video)
16. "Bow Wow's Biggest Fans"

Bonus DVD

1. "Big Dreams (The Movie)"
2. "Caviar" (multimedia track)

== Personnel ==
Adapted from the Wanted liner notes.

- Jermaine Dupri – executive producer
- Diane McDonald – production coordinator
- Vlado Meller – mastering (Sony Music Studios, NYC)
- Chris Feldmann – art direction
- Christian Lantry – photography
- Teresa Caldwell and Taste Clothing Boutique – stylist
- Angela Henderson – styling assistant
- Shantel – hair stylist

== Charts ==
=== Weekly charts ===
Weekly chart performance for Wanted
Chart (2005)	Peak position
Australian Urban Albums (ARIA)	13
French Albums (SNEP)	107
US Billboard 200	3
US Top R&B/Hip-Hop Albums (Billboard)	3
US Top Rap Albums (Billboard)	1

=== Year-end charts ===
2005 year-end chart performance for Wanted
Chart (2005)	Position
US Billboard 200	93
US Top R&B/Hip-Hop Albums (Billboard)	19

2006 year-end chart performance for Wanted
Chart (2006)	Position
US Top R&B/Hip-Hop Albums (Billboard)	95

== Certifications ==
Certifications for Wanted
Region	Certification	Certified units/sales
United States (RIAA)	Platinum	1,000,000^{^}
^{^} Shipments figures based on certification alone.

== See also ==
- List of number-one rap albums of 2005 (U.S.)
