= Ekranoplan (album) =

Studio album by Assemble Head in Sunburst Sound
- Released: March 20, 2007
- Genre: Psychedelic rock
- Label: Tee Pee

Assemble Head in Sunburst Sound chronology
Assemble Head in Sunburst Sound (2005)	Ekranoplan (2007)	When Sweet Sleep Returned (2009)

Professional ratings
Review scores
Source	Rating
Allmusic	4.5/5 stars

Ekranoplan is the second studio album by American psychedelic rock band Assemble Head in Sunburst Sound, released in March 2007 on Tee Pee Records.

== Track list ==
1. "Ekranoplan" – 3:17
2. "Mosquito Lantern" – 3:51
3. "Rudy on the Corner" – 3:44
4. "Summon the Vardig" – 6:09
5. "Occult Roots" – 4:15
6. "Message by Mistral and Thunderclap" – 3:45
7. "D. Brown" – 5:36
8. "The Chocolate Maiden's Misty Summer Morning" – 4:15
9. "Gemini 9" – 3:29
