= When Sweet Sleep Returned =

Studio album by Assemble Head in Sunburst Sound
- Released: April 7, 2009
- Genre: Psychedelic rock
- Label: Tee Pee

Assemble Head in Sunburst Sound chronology
Ekranoplan (2007)	When Sweet Sleep Returned (2009)	Manzanita (2012)

Professional ratings
Review scores
Source	Rating
Allmusic	4/5 stars
Rock Sound	7/10 stars

When Sweet Sleep Returned is the third studio album by American psychedelic rock band Assemble Head in Sunburst Sound, released in April 2009 on Tee Pee Records.

== Track listing ==
1. "Two Stage Rocket" – 3:27
2. "Two Birds" – 7:37
3. "Drunken Leaves" – 4:18
4. "The Slumbering Ones" – 4:50
5. "Kolob Canyon" – 5:55
6. "By the Ripping Green" – 5:07
7. "Clive and the Lyre" – 3:51
8. "End Under Down" – 5:36
