= Tinted Windows (band) =

American rock band

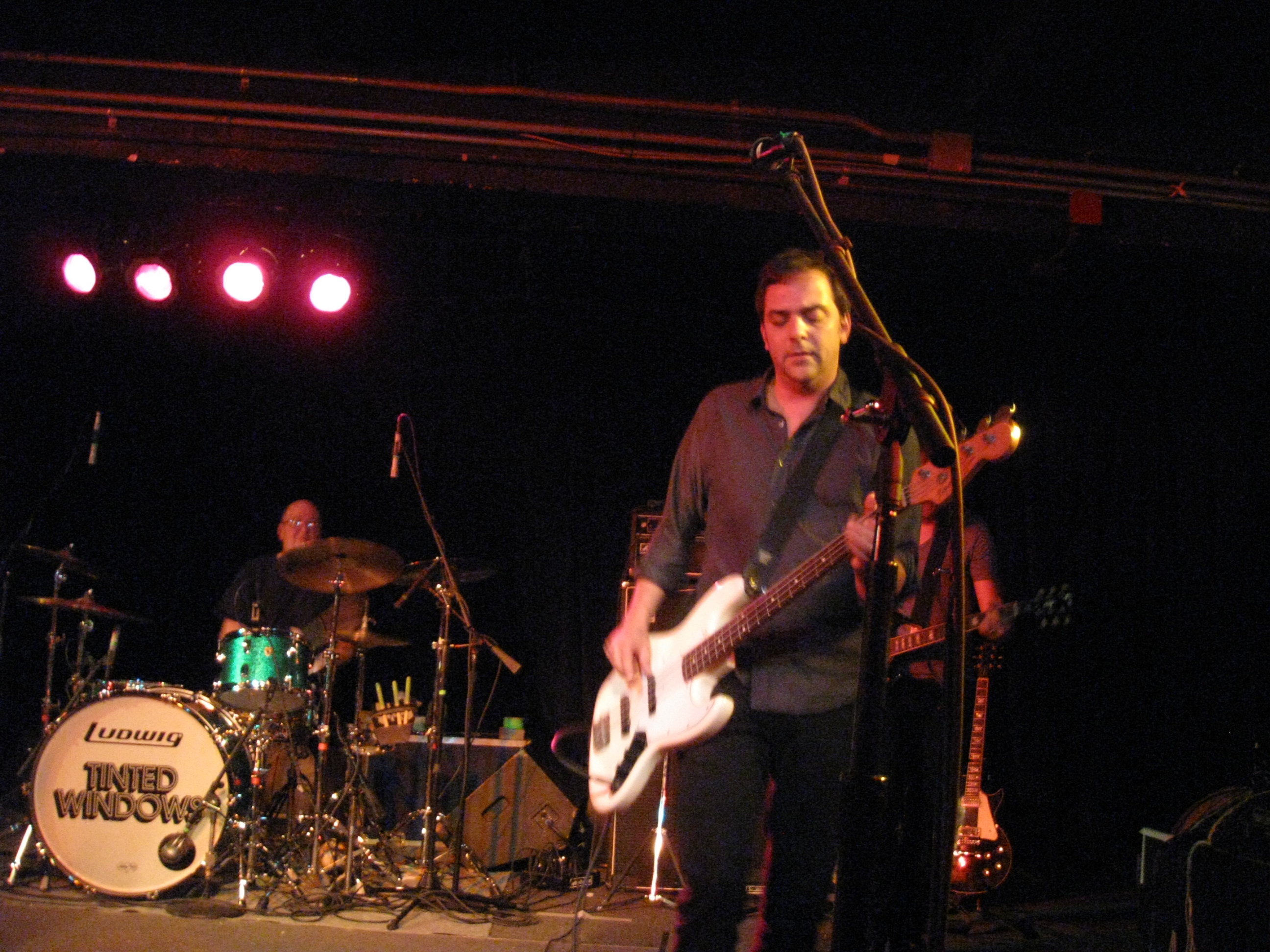
- Tinted Windows at the Black Cat nightclub in 2009

Background information
- Origin: New York City, U.S.
- Genres: Power pop; alternative rock; garage rock; post-punk revival
- Years active: 2009–2011, 2021
- Label: S-Curve
- Past members: Adam Schlesinger; Taylor Hanson; James Iha; Bun E. Carlos

Tinted Windows were an American rock supergroup formed by guitarist James Iha of The Smashing Pumpkins, singer Taylor Hanson of Hanson, bassist Adam Schlesinger of Fountains of Wayne and Ivy, and drummer Bun E. Carlos of Cheap Trick. The band issued one album in 2009, and performed live in 2009 and 2010. Josh Lattanzi of The Lemonheads performed with the band as the second guitarist.

== Career ==
The first performance by the band was on March 18, 2009, at Cain's Ballroom in Tulsa, Oklahoma. The band made their South by Southwest debut on March 20, 2009, at the Levi/Fader Fort, followed by a set at the Pangea Lounge. The band also played at The Bamboozle in New Jersey on May 3, 2009.

On February 19, 2009, it was announced that the band signed with S-Curve Records. On April 21, 2009, it was confirmed that their self-titled album Tinted Windows had been released on that label.

On February 24, the band digitally released their debut single "Kind of a Girl" alongside a promotional video, with a segment from a fictional music show Rock After Dark. They performed the song on Late Show with David Letterman on April 21. They performed on Late Night with Jimmy Fallon on April 24.

Tinted Windows played concerts in the U.S. in June, August, and September 2009, and in Japan in January 2010.

The band's Facebook page has not changed since December 6, 2009. While the band initially appeared on their record label S-Curve Records' website, they were removed from the artist lineup sometime between June 6 and August 8, 2011.

In 2014, band member Taylor Hanson mentioned the band to the press a number of times. In an interview published October 9, 2014, with Coup De Main Magazine, Hanson indicated that the band would be reconvening to write new material "sometime next month" and there was "some process going on now to make a new album." However, no further updates were given, and there is no evidence any new material was either written or recorded by the band.

In 2020, former Tinted Windows member Adam Schlesinger died of complications related to COVID-19. Tinted Windows reunited in 2021 during a live streaming event to celebrate Schlesinger's memory.

== Discography ==
- Tinted Windows (2009)
