= Pins & Panzers =

Studio album by Plushgun
- Released: February 17, 2009
- Genres: New wave, indie rock, synth-pop
- Length: 39:28
- Label: Tommy Boy

Plushgun chronology
| Dancing in a Minefield EP (2008) | Pins & Panzers (2009) | Me. Me. (2012) |

Pins & Panzers is the 2009 debut album of indie band Plushgun, released on February 17, 2009.

== Reception ==
Professional ratings
Review scores
| Source | Rating |
|---|---|
| PopMatters | 7/10 stars |
| AllMusic | 3.5/5 stars |

Alex Henderson of AllMusic drew comparisons to 1980s new wave and synth-pop acts such as Talking Heads, the Pet Shop Boys, OMD, Berlin, and the Human League. He stated, "Humor, introspection, and vulnerability are all important parts of the picture on Pins & Panzers, which won't appeal to rigid anti-nostalgia zealots but is nonetheless a consistently enjoyable and well-crafted effort."

== Track listing ==
1. "Dancing in a Minefield" – 3:36
2. "How We Roll" – 4:05
3. "Just Impolite" – 3:52
4. "A Crush to Pass the Time" – 4:03
5. "The Dark in You" – 3:54
6. "Let Me Kiss You Now (And I'll Fade Away)" – 3:26
7. "Union Pool" – 4:01
8. "14 Candles" – 4:10
9. "Without a Light" – 4:31
10. "An Aria" – 3:54
