= Assemble Head in Sunburst Sound =

American rock band

- Origin: San Francisco, California, U.S.
- Genres: Psychedelic rock, stoner rock
- Labels: Tee Pee Records
- Members: Michael Lardas; Jefferson Marshall; Charlie Saufley; Anderson Landbridge; Camilla Saufley
- Website: Assemble Head in Sunburst Sound on Facebook

Assemble Head in Sunburst Sound is a psychedelic rock band formed in San Francisco, California, in the early 2000s. Originally consisting of a trio – Michael Lardas, Jefferson Marshall, and Charlie Saufley – Assemble Head in Sunburst Sound grew to a five-piece by 2009 with the additions of multi-instrumentalists Anderson Landbridge and Camilla Saufley

Following the band's self-released 2005 debut, which was limited to 500 copies, they signed to Tee Pee Records and have since released three studio albums: Ekranoplan (2007), When Sweet Sleep Returned (2009), and Manzanita (2012).

== Discography ==
- Assemble Head in Sunburst Sound (2005)
- Ekranoplan (2007)
- When Sweet Sleep Returned (2009)
- Manzanita (2012)
