= Let Me Hold You =

2005 single by Bow Wow

Single by Bow Wow featuring Omarion

from the album Wanted
- Released: March 11, 2005
- Genre: Hip-hop; R&B
- Length: 4:08
- Label: Columbia
- Songwriters: Jermaine Mauldin; Bryan-Michael Cox; Ernest Wilson; Brenda Russell
- Producers: Jermaine Dupri; No I.D.

Bow Wow singles chronology
"Baby It's You" (2004)	"Let Me Hold You" (2005)	"Like You" (2005)

Omarion singles chronology
"I'm Tryna" (2005)	"Let Me Hold You" (2005)	"Entourage" (2006)

Bow Wow and Omarion singles chronology
"Let Me Hold You" (2005)	"Girlfriend" (2007)

Music video
- "Let Me Hold You" on YouTube

"Let Me Hold You" is a song by American rapper Bow Wow. It was the first single off his fourth album, Wanted (2005). Released on March 11, 2005, the song features American R&B singer Omarion (the first collaboration they did together). It was co-written and co-produced by frequent producer Jermaine Dupri and No I.D. and uses a sample of Luther Vandross' 1985 version of Brenda Russell's "If Only for One Night".

The song received positive reviews from critics. "Let Me Hold You" peaked at number four on the Billboard Hot 100, making this the first top 10 hit for both Bow Wow and for Omarion as a solo artist. It also became a number-one hit for both artists on the Hot Rap Songs chart and stayed there for seven weeks. The song also peaked at numbers 2 and 10 on both the Hot R&B/Hip-Hop Songs and Mainstream Top 40 charts respectively, and reached the top 40 in countries like Australia, New Zealand, Ireland and the United Kingdom. The song was certified Platinum by the Recording Industry Association of America (RIAA) for selling over 1,000,000 copies. A music video, directed by Bryan Barber, was made to promote the single and featured Bow Wow and Omarion hanging out at a house party.

== Background ==
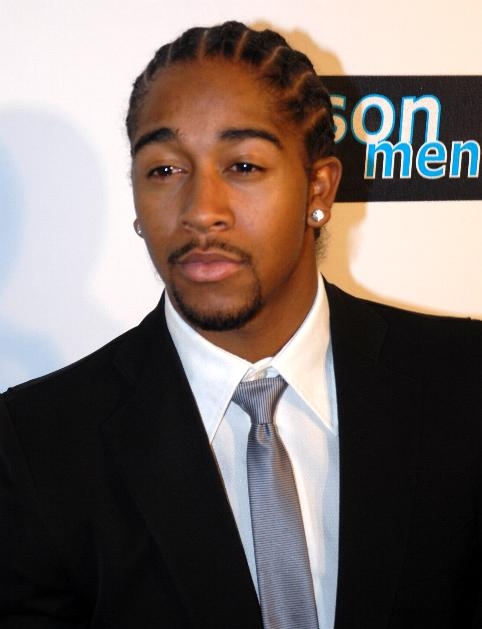
Co-producer Jermaine Dupri was the one who suggested to Bow Wow that he should record the song with Omarion (pictured).

Bow Wow had publicly announced his interpretation of the song's meaning as he stated in an interview with MTV:

"Basically the song is me talking to a girl and telling her, 'These are the things I can do for you. Let me hold you down. This is what I want to do for you as a man. These are the things I'm capable of doing for you if you get with me. Just hear me out.' I'm just really talking to the ladies. The song is really special to me, and I love that song."

The collaboration began when Bow Wow was talking with producer Jermaine Dupri about the song and how he suggested on getting Omarion to appear on the track.

In a 2011 retrospective of his previous hits with Complex, producer No I.D. said that this was the first time he worked with Dupri and was asked by him to bring over his samples to pick one that would be used for a single to finish off the album. He played him the Luther Vandross sample and was hesitant about his initial reaction at first before thinking it over and seeing its potential as a smash hit.

== Composition ==
"Let Me Hold You" was co-written and co-produced by Jermaine Dupri and No ID. It features a sample of Luther Vandross' version of "If Only for One Night", written and originally performed by Brenda Russell. The song is in 4/4 time and in the key of E♭ minor.

== Critical reception ==
The song received positive reviews from music critics. AllMusic's David Jeffries put it alongside "Like You" as the album's highlights that work "on a more adult level." Steve 'Flash' Juon of RapReviews praised the production by Dupri and No ID for their clever take on the sample, Bow Wow's lyrics and Omarion's guest vocal performance. Angie Romero of Vibe praised the sing-song hook for making the track "undeniably catchy."

== Commercial performance ==
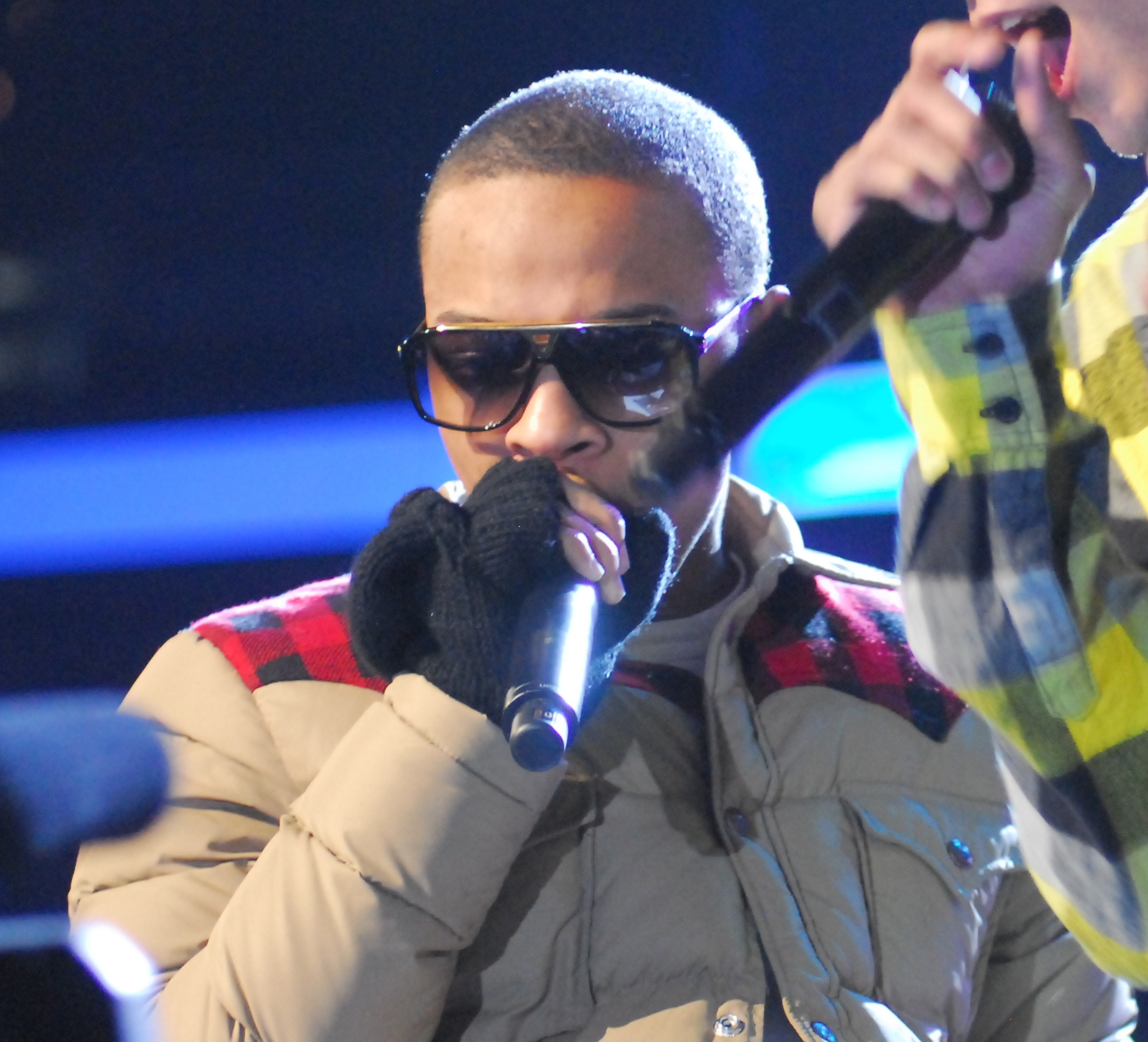
"Let Me Hold You" was Bow Wow's first top ten hit on the Billboard Hot 100.

"Let Me Hold You" debuted at number 93 on the Billboard Hot 100 for the week of May 21, 2005. Three weeks later, it moved twenty-two spots from number 73 to 51 for the week of June 11, 2005. It moved eleven spots from number 28 to 17 for the week of July 2, 2005. It moved four spots from number 15 to 11 for the week of July 16, 2005. It reached the top ten for the week of July 23, 2005, at number eight. It reached its peak at number four and spent a total of 24 weeks on the chart. With the release of "Let Me Hold You", Bow Wow achieved his first top ten hit on the Billboard Hot 100, surpassing his 2003 hit "Let's Get Down" which peaked at number 14. The song was also Omarion's first top-10 hit as a solo artist, although he previously had a number-one hit with "Bump, Bump, Bump" as a member of B2K.

"Let Me Hold You" was Bow Wow and Omarion's first entry on the Pop 100, where it peaked at number 14. On the Hot R&B/Hip-Hop Songs chart, the single peaked at number two. The song also became a number-one hit for both artists on the Hot Rap Songs chart for seven weeks and the Rhythmic Top 40 chart for five weeks. On May 14, 2006, "Let Me Hold You" was certified Platinum by the Recording Industry Association of America (RIAA) for selling over 1,000,000 copies in the United States.

== Music video ==
The song's music video, directed by Bryan Barber, features Bow Wow attempting to woo a girl with mixed results. After surprising her at her house, the two attend a house party, but problems arise as she is less social than Bow Wow, who begins talking to other girls. After a brief reconciliation, the two argue again over the music at the party. Once again, the two are able to reconcile, but things remain awkward, and they do not communicate on their return home. The video appears to be an unresolved cliffhanger, but a "to be continued" title is shown as the video ends. (The video's story is continued in Bow Wow's next video, "Like You".) The video features a cameo from the song's co-producer, Jermaine Dupri and despite the rumors, the video did not feature a young then unknown Future. It was a So So Def ghostwriter named Jaron Alston, also known as The Kid Slim.

== Live performances ==
"Let Me Hold You" was a staple at concerts for Bow Wow's 2005 summer tour Scream Tour IV. It was performed at the 2005 American Music Awards on November 22, 2005, as part of a medley with Bow Wow's "Like You" and Omarion's "O".

== Awards and nominations ==
Year	Ceremony	Award	Result
2006	2006 MTV Video Music Awards Japan	Best Collaboration	Nominated

== Track listings ==
US 12-inch single

1. "Let Me Hold You" (radio version)
2. "Let Me Hold You" (instrumental)
3. "Let Me Hold You" (album version)
4. "Let Me Hold You" (instrumental with background vocals)

UK CD single

1. "Let Me Hold You" (radio version)
2. "My Baby" (album version without intro)

Australian CD single

1. "Let Me Hold You" (radio version) – 4:08
2. "Let Me Hold You" (album version) – 4:08
3. "Mo Money" – 4:06
4. "Let Me Hold You" (instrumental) – 4:08
5. "Let Me Hold You" (video)

== Credits and personnel ==
Credits are adapted from the liner notes of Wanted.

Recording

- Recorded at Southside Studios (Atlanta, Georgia), Battery Studios (New York City), and The Record Plant (Hollywood, California)
- Mixed at Southside Studios (Atlanta, Georgia)

Personnel

- Jermaine Dupri – producer, mixer
- No ID – co-producer
- John Horesco IV – recording, assistant engineer
- Tadd Mingo – assistant engineer
- Brian McCarthy – assistant engineer
- Gelli – assistant engineer
- Phil Tan – mixer

== Charts ==
=== Weekly charts ===
Chart (2005–2006)	Peak position
Australia (ARIA)	14
Australian Urban (ARIA)	6
Canada CHR/Pop Top 30 (Radio & Records)	17
France (SNEP)	40
Germany (GfK)	35
Ireland (IRMA)	16
New Zealand (Recorded Music NZ)	8
Netherlands (Urban Top 100)	37
Scottish Singles Sales (Official Charts)	46
Sweden (Sverigetopplistan)	26
UK Singles (Official Charts)	27
UK Hip Hop/R&B (Official Charts)	2
US Billboard Hot 100	4
US Hot R&B/Hip-Hop Songs (Billboard)	2
US Hot Rap Songs (Billboard)	1
US Pop 100 (Billboard)	14
US Pop Airplay (Billboard)	10
US Rhythmic Airplay (Billboard)	1

=== Year-end charts ===
Chart (2005)	Position
US Billboard Hot 100	29
US Hot R&B/Hip-Hop Songs (Billboard)	24
US Mainstream Top 40 (Billboard)	61
US Rhythmic Top 40 (Billboard)	13

== Certifications ==
Region	Certification	Certified units/sales
New Zealand (RMNZ)	2× Platinum	60,000^{‡}
United Kingdom (BPI)	Silver	200,000^{‡}
United States (RIAA)	Platinum	1,000,000^{^}
^{^} Shipments figures based on certification alone.^{‡} Sales+streaming figures based on certification alone.

== Release history ==
Region	Date	Format(s)	Label(s)	Ref.
United States	March 11, 2005	Digital download	Columbia	
United States	May 16, 2005	Rhythmic contemporary; urban radio	Columbia	
United States	July 5, 2005	Contemporary hit radio	Columbia	
Australia	September 19, 2005	CD	Columbia	

== See also ==
- List of Billboard number-one rap singles of the 2000s
- List of Billboard Rhythmic number-one songs of the 2000s
