= Like You (Bow Wow song) =

2005 single by Bow Wow

Single by Bow Wow featuring Ciara

from the album Wanted
- B-side: "The Don, the Dutch"
- Released: July 12, 2005
- Studio: Southside (Atlanta, Georgia)
- Genre: Hip hop; R&B
- Length: 3:24
- Label: Columbia; Sony Urban Music
- Songwriters: Jermaine Dupri; Johntá Austin; Jaron Alson; Ricky Bell; Ralph Tresvant
- Producers: Jermaine Dupri; Bryan Michael Cox

Bow Wow singles chronology
"Let Me Hold You" (2005)	"Like You" (2005)	"I Think They Like Me (Remix)" (2005)

Ciara singles chronology
"Lose Control" (2005)	"Like You" (2005)	"And I" (2005)

Music video
- "Like You" on YouTube

"Like You" is a song by American rapper Bow Wow featuring singer Ciara. It was written by Jermaine Dupri, Jaron Alston, and Johntá Austin, and produced by Dupri and Bryan Michael Cox for Bow Wow's fourth album Wanted (2005). The song includes the keyboard chord of New Edition's "I'm Leaving You Again" written by Jaron Alson, Ricky Bell, and Ralph Tresvant. "Like You" was released as the album's second single on July 12, 2005, reaching atop the Billboard Hot R&B/Hip-Hop Songs chart and peaking at number three on the Billboard Hot 100, giving Bow Wow his second top 10 hit on that chart, as was Ciara's fifth. The song also charted in the top 40 in countries like Ireland, Germany and the UK. To date, "Like You" remains Bow Wow's highest charting song.

== Commercial performance ==
"Like You" debuted at number 63 on US Billboard Hot 100 for the week of August 6, 2005, while Bow Wow's "Let Me Hold You" featuring Omarion was in the top 5. It moved fifteen spots to number 49 for the week of August 13, 2005. It entered the top 40 for the week of August 20, 2005, by moving twenty-four spots to number 25. It moved thirteen spots to number 12 for the week of August 27, 2005. It peaked at number three for the week of October 1, 2005, and stayed there for two weeks. It stayed on the chart for twenty-one weeks. It surpassed "Let Me Hold You" as Bow Wow's highest charting song on the Hot 100, giving him his second top 10 hit, as well as give Ciara her fifth top 10 hit.

== Music video ==
The video was directed by Bryan Barber and set in a high-rise apartment building. In the video, each of the two performers already have a significant other. Bow Wow lives one floor above Ciara and they are infatuated with each other. While in the process of getting ready to meet their respective dates, they rap and sing to each other and have a sequence of talking to each other on the phone. Bow Wow and Ciara encounter each other on the elevator while leaving their apartments and they have an imaginary moment on the elevator. When the elevator reaches the lobby, they go outside to meet their significant others; never acting upon the moment. Actor and comedian Alex Thomas Jr. plays the valet in the video.

== Live performance ==
Bow Wow and Ciara performed "Like You" at the 2005 American Music Awards on November 22, 2005, as part of a medley with Omarion's "O" and Bow Wow's "Let Me Hold You".

== Track listings ==
US 12-inch single

A1. "Like You" (album version) – 3:25
A2. "Like You" (instrumental) – 3:25
B1. "Like You" (acappella) – 2:59
B2. "Like You" (instrumental with background vocals) – 3:25

European CD single

1. "Like You" (album version) – 3:25
2. "Like You" (Octave Remix) – 3:10

UK CD1

1. "Like You" (album version) – 3:25
2. "Like You" (The Paduan's Remix) – 3:42

UK CD2 and Australian CD single

1. "Like You" (album version)
2. "Like You" (Octave Remix)
3. "Like You" (instrumental)
4. "The Don, the Dutch"
5. "Like You" (video)

UK 12-inch single

A1. "Like You" (album version)
A2. "Like You" (instrumental)
A3. "Like You" (Paduan Remix)
B1. "Like You" (Octave Remix)
B2. "The Don, the Dutch"

== Charts ==
=== Weekly charts ===
Chart (2005–2006)	Peak position
Australia (ARIA)	16
Australian Urban (ARIA)	4
Canada CHR/Pop Top 30 (Radio & Records)	12
Germany (GfK)	39
Ireland (IRMA)	4
Scottish Singles Sales (Official Charts)	28
UK Singles (Official Charts)	17
UK Hip Hop/R&B (Official Charts)	2
US Billboard Hot 100	3
US Hot R&B/Hip-Hop Songs (Billboard)	1
US Hot Rap Songs (Billboard)	1
US Pop Airplay (Billboard)	9
US Rhythmic Airplay (Billboard)	1

=== Year-end charts ===
Chart (2005)	Position
US Billboard Hot 100	30
US Hot R&B/Hip-Hop Songs (Billboard)	20
US Mainstream Top 40 (Billboard)	70
US Rhythmic Top 40 (Billboard)	15

Chart (2006)	Position
Australian Urban (ARIA)	36
UK Urban (Music Week)	31

== Certifications ==
Region	Certification	Certified units/sales
New Zealand (RMNZ)	2× Platinum	60,000^{‡}
United Kingdom (BPI)	Silver	200,000^{‡}
United States (RIAA) Digital	Gold	500,000^{*}
United States (RIAA) Mastertone	Platinum	1,000,000^{*}
^{*} Sales figures based on certification alone.^{‡} Sales+streaming figures based on certification alone.

== Release history ==
Region	Date	Format(s)	Label(s)	Ref.
United States	July 12, 2005	Digital download EP	Columbia; Sony Urban Music	
United States	August 15, 2005	Rhythmic contemporary radio	Columbia; Sony Urban Music	
United States	August 22, 2005	Contemporary hit radio	Columbia; Sony Urban Music	
United Kingdom	March 6, 2006	CD	Columbia; Sony Urban Music	
Australia	March 13, 2006	CD	Columbia; Sony Urban Music	

== See also ==
- List of number-one R&B singles of 2005 (U.S.)
- List of Billboard number-one rap singles of the 2000s
