= Hood Hop =

Studio album by J-Kwon
- Released: April 6, 2004
- Recorded: 2003–2004
- Genre: Hip hop
- Length: 53:17
- Labels: So So Def; Arista; Sony
- Producers: Jermaine Dupri; Trackboyz; Bryan-Michael Cox

J-Kwon chronology
Hood Hop (2004)	Hood Hop 2 (2009)

Singles from Hood Hop
- 1. "Tipsy" Released: January 2, 2004

Hood Hop is the debut studio album by American rapper J-Kwon, released on April 6, 2004 by So So Def Recordings and Arista Records. The album's lead single, "Tipsy", was successful on the US, UK and Australian charts. A popular remix of the song features Chingy and Murphy Lee. The album sold 125,000 copies in its first week of release.

== Critical reception ==
Professional ratings
Review scores
Source	Rating
AllMusic	2.5/5 stars
Blender	2/5 stars
Common Sense Media	1/5 stars
RapReviews	6/10
Rolling Stone	2/5 stars
USA Today	2/4 stars

Steve 'Flash' Juon of RapReviews commended J-Kwon for being earnest throughout the trope-filled track listing and making the most of his newfound success "for himself, his neighborhood and his family", but felt the album overall placed him in a position that won't guarantee long-term staying power in hip-hop. AllMusic editor Andy Kellman felt that production team the Trackboyz showed promise based on the single "Tipsy", but found Kwon to be an above-average rapper that only slightly changes his vocal tones. Rolling Stone's Christian Hoard and Jon Caramanica criticized the production throughout the record and Kwon's "entry-level" verses, calling him "an argument against drafting high school rappers straight to the pros." Steve Jones from USA Today also criticized Kwon for relying heavily on typical hip-hop scenarios and delivering "uninspired, by-the-numbers tracks ("Parking Lot", "Welcome to tha Hood")", concluding that, "[T]here's got to be more going on around the way than this." Blender contributor Chris Ryan commended J-Kwon for keeping a light mood with his debut's "bubbling, synth-heavy production", but felt that his "naked house-party anthems ("Underwear") and declarations of derriére devotion ("Show Your Ass") get tiresome quick."

== Track listing ==
No.	Title	Writer(s)	Producer(s)	Length
1.	"Intro"		The Trackboyz	1:19
2.	"Hood Hop"	Jerrell Jones; Joe Kent; Mark Williams	The Trackboyz	4:06
3.	"Tipsy"	Jones; Kent; M. Williams	The Trackboyz	4:03
4.	"IC IC" (featuring St. Lunatics)	Jones; Kent; M. Williams; Cornell Jaynes, Jr.; Ali Jones; Murphy Lee	The Trackboyz	4:36
5.	"Show Your Ass" (featuring Eboni Eyes)	Jones; Kent; Eboni Williams; M. Williams		4:05
6.	"Musty Interlude I"		The Trackboyz	1:15
7.	"They Ask Me"	Jones; Kent; M. Williams	The Trackboyz	4:00
8.	"Underwear"	Jones; Kent; M. Williams	The Trackboyz	4:14
9.	"Welcome to tha Hood"	Jones; Kent; M. Williams; Darryll Barksdale; Morgan Robinson	The Trackboyz	4:00
10.	"U Ain't Gotta Like Me" (featuring Big B)	Jones; Kent; M. Williams	The Trackboyz	4:40
11.	"Musty Interlude II"		The Trackboyz	1:10
12.	"My Enemies" (featuring Jermaine Dupri)	Jermaine Dupri; Jones; James Phillips	Jermaine Dupri; LRoc (co.)	3:22
13.	"Parking Lot"	Jones; Kent; M. Williams	The Trackboyz	4:00
14.	"You & Me" (featuring Sadiyyah)	Jones; Kent; M. Williams	The Trackboyz	4:24
15.	"Morning Light"	Jones; Bryan-Michael Cox; Craig Love	Bryan-Michael Cox	4:03

Sample credits

- "Welcome to tha Hood" contains replayed elements from "Rockin' It", written by Darryll Barksdale and Morgan Robinson.

== Chart positions ==
=== Weekly charts ===
Chart (2004)	Peak position
German Albums (Offizielle Top 100)	78
UK Albums (Official Charts)	84
US Billboard 200	7
US Top R&B/Hip-Hop Albums (Billboard)	4

=== Year-end charts ===
Chart (2004)	Position
US Billboard 200	122
US Top R&B/Hip-Hop Albums (Billboard)	46

== Certifications ==
Region	Certification	Certified units/sales
United States (RIAA)	Gold	500,000^{^}
^{^} Shipments figures based on certification alone.
