= Tipsy (song) =

2004 single by J-Kwon

Single by J-Kwon

from the album Hood Hop
- Released: January 12, 2004
- Genre: Hip-hop
- Length: 4:03 (album version); 3:59 (no intro)
- Label: So So Def; Arista
- Songwriters: Jerrell Jones; Joe Kent; Mark Williams; Brian May (uncredited)
- Producer: Trackboyz

J-Kwon singles chronology
"Tipsy" (2004)	"You & Me" (2004)

"Tipsy" is the debut single by American rapper J-Kwon, released through So So Def Recordings and Arista Records on January 12, 2004, as the lead single from his debut studio album, Hood Hop (2004). Written by J-Kwon alongside Joe Kent and Mark Williams, "Tipsy" was produced by American production team Trackboyz.

== Background ==
"Tipsy" peaked at number two on the Billboard Hot 100 on April 17, 2004, after 14 weeks on the chart, and it peaked at number two on the Hot R&B/Hip-Hop Singles & Tracks. Outside of the United States, "Tipsy" peaked within the top 10 of charts in Australia, New Zealand, and the United Kingdom, but topped the UK R&B Singles Chart in the latter country. To date, "Tipsy" has been J-Kwon's biggest and only hit, with his next single "You & Me" being a moderate success peaking in the top 20 on the U.S. Rap chart. J-Kwon was 17 at the time of the release of "Tipsy", a song considered an ode to underage drinking.

The song samples the beat of the 1977 song "We Will Rock You" by British rock band Queen.

== Music video ==
In the video, J-Kwon holds a house party. The video pays homage to House Party, Risky Business, and the music video of the song "Gin and Juice". Daz Dillinger, Jermaine Dupri, Da Brat, and Murphy Lee make cameo appearances. Comedian and actor Lavell Crawford also makes an appearance at the end and beginning as J-Kwon's father.

== Remix ==
The official remix (frequently referred to as "Still Tipsy") features fellow St. Louis rappers Chingy and Murphy Lee. Sway DaSafo sampled the song's beat for "Pepsi", an anti-drinking spoof song on his debut album.

== In popular culture ==
- "Tipsy" was featured in the films Breakin' All the Rules, White Chicks and Soul Plane, as well as in the video game L.A. Rush. It was also heard during a club scene in the episode "Moral Midgetry", from season three of The Wire. J-Kwon performed the song on the season 29 finale of Saturday Night Live hosted by twin sisters Mary-Kate and Ashley Olsen.
- A club remix of "Tipsy" was featured in the 2012 film, Project X and This Is the End. In 2015, it was featured in the movie Sisters.
- In 2024, rap trio Clipping released a cover.
- In 2024, Shaboozey released "A Bar Song (Tipsy)", which refers to the clean version of "Tipsy", with the line "everybody at the bar gettin' tipsy" prominent in the chorus. "A Bar Song" charted at number one on both the Hot 100 and Billboard's Hot Country Songs chart.

== Charts ==
=== Weekly charts ===
Chart (2004)	Peak position
Australia (ARIA)	5
Australian Urban (ARIA)	2
Belgium (Ultratop 50 Flanders)	24
Canada CHR/Pop Top 30 (Radio & Records)	6
Germany (GfK)	17
Ireland (Irish Singles Chart)	8
Netherlands (Dutch Top 40)	23
Netherlands (Single Top 100)	18
New Zealand (Recorded Music NZ)	9
Sweden (Sverigetopplistan)	48
UK Singles (Official Charts)	4
UK Hip Hop/R&B (Official Charts)	1
US Billboard Hot 100	2
US Hot R&B/Hip-Hop Songs (Billboard)	2
US Hot Rap Songs (Billboard)	1
US Pop Airplay (Billboard)	8
US Rhythmic Airplay (Billboard)	2

=== Year-end charts ===
Chart (2004)	Position
Australia (ARIA)	35
New Zealand (Recorded Music NZ)	33
UK Singles (OCC)	58
UK Urban (Music Week)	4
US Billboard Hot 100	11
US Hot R&B/Hip-Hop Songs (Billboard)	17
US Rhythmic (Billboard)	4

== Certifications ==
Region	Certification	Certified units/sales
Australia (ARIA)	Platinum	70,000^{^}
New Zealand (RMNZ)	Gold	5,000^{*}
United Kingdom (BPI)	Gold	400,000^{‡}
United States (RIAA)	Gold	500,000^{*}
United States (RIAA) Mastertone	Gold	500,000^{*}
^{*} Sales figures based on certification alone.^{^} Shipments figures based on certification alone.^{‡} Sales+streaming figures based on certification alone.

== Release history ==
Region	Date	Format(s)	Label(s)	Ref.
United States	January 12, 2004	Rhythmic contemporary; urban contemporary radio	So So Def; Arista	
United States	February 17, 2004	Contemporary hit radio	So So Def; Arista	
United Kingdom	July 12, 2004	CD	Arista	
