= Tinted Windows (album) =

Studio album by Tinted Windows
- Released: April 21, 2009
- Recorded: Stratosphere Sound Studios in New York City, 2009
- Genres: Alternative rock, power pop, post-punk revival
- Length: 35:47
- Label: S-Curve
- Producers: James Iha, Adam Schlesinger

Tinted Windows is the only studio album by American supergroup Tinted Windows. Tinted Windows was formed in New York City and consists of guitarist James Iha, previously of The Smashing Pumpkins and A Perfect Circle, singer Taylor Hanson of Hanson, bassist Adam Schlesinger of Fountains of Wayne and Ivy, and Cheap Trick's Bun E. Carlos. The album was recorded at Stratosphere Sound Studios in New York, which Schlesinger and Iha co-owned with Ivy's Andy Chase.

The band signed to S-Curve Records and the album was released on April 21, 2009. An appearance of the band on Late Show with David Letterman occurred on the eve of the release. The album debuted at number 59 on the Billboard 200.

== Critical reception ==
Professional ratings
Aggregate scores
Source	Rating
Metacritic	57/100
Review scores
Source	Rating
AllMusic	3.5/5 stars
The A.V. Club	B
Entertainment Weekly	B+
Pitchfork	3.5/10
PopMatters	2/10 stars
Rolling Stone	3/5 stars
Slant Magazine	1.5/5 stars
Spin	3/5 stars
Toronto Star	2.5/4 stars
Time Out	3/5 stars

Tinted Windows received generally mixed reviews from music critics who found the artists' combined musicianship lacking in vision and finesse throughout the project. At Metacritic, which assigns a normalized rating out of 100 to reviews from mainstream critics, the album received an average score of 57, based on 9 reviews.

AllMusic's Stephen Thomas Erlewine praised the band members' combined musicianship for complementing each other and being reminiscent of 60s-70s pop-rock, singling out Taylor Hanson's vocal work as being a highlight, concluding that "Of all the guys here, he is the only one to never have performed in a guitar-heavy rock & roll band, and his thrill to be singing these sweet melodies over these big, fuzzy guitars can be infectious." Chris Willman of Entertainment Weekly also commended the band's musicianship for being equal and having cohesion throughout the album, concluding that: "It's all hook-riddled, fast, and ephemeral, and if you don’t love it, your tie's too wide." Noel Murray of The A.V. Club said that despite Hanson's voice lacking grit and the material being transparent, he praised the rest of the band for crafting strong production and hook-filled lyrics, concluding that "Whatever the intended (or actual) audience, songs as catchy and spirited as "Messing With My Head" and "Without Love" are timelessly fun." Mikael Wood, writing for Spin, said that "these bouncy, hook-crammed power-pop jams are safe and catchy enough for Jo Bros fans and Stacy’s mom alike."

Stephen M. Deusner of Pitchfork said that the album falters after the first half when the tempo diminishes and found the band's musical contributions middling and uninspired, saying that: "Ultimately, the whole of Tinted Windows is so much less than the sum of its considerable parts that it's almost tragic. In playing to pop's imagined past, this quartet neglect the idiosyncrasies that made them such compelling individual artists: the inventiveness of Iha's solo work, the humor and specificity of Fountains, the exuberance of "MMMBop", the sweet escapism of Cheap Trick in the 70s." Evan Sawdey of PopMatters found the supergroup project disappointing, criticizing Schlesinger's nondescript production and composition work and Hanson's vocal delivery coming off as uninterested and lacklustre, saying that: "Not only is Tinted Windows a terrible, hookless affair, it may very well be the worst album to be released in 2009 thus far." Kevin Liedel of Slant Magazine heavily criticized the album for lacking in artistic quality and distinguishable taste from a stellar group of musicians, concluding that: "One would think the presence of such savvy and grizzled rock veterans would have been enough to avoid such a limp-fisted disaster. Instead, listeners are subjected to nothing more than a glorified boy band trying desperately to recapture a second wind."

== Track listing ==
All songs written by Adam Schlesinger except as noted.

No.	Title	Length
1.	"Kind of a Girl"	3:13
2.	"Messing with My Head"	2:55
3.	"Dead Serious"	4:13
4.	"Can't Get a Read on You"	2:53
5.	"Back with You" (James Iha)	3:43
6.	"Without Love"	3:01
7.	"Cha Cha" (Iha)	2:21
8.	"We Got Something"	2:34
9.	"Nothing to Me" (Taylor Hanson)	3:23
10.	"Doncha Wanna"	4:02
11.	"Take Me Back" (Hanson, Schlesinger)	3:29

Bonus tracks
No.	Title	Length
12.	"New Cassette"	3:08
13.	"The Dirt" (Japanese release)	3:31

== Personnel ==
Tinted Windows

- Taylor Hanson: lead vocals
- James Iha: guitar, backing vocals
- Adam Schlesinger: bass, backing vocals
- Bun E. Carlos: drums, percussion

Production

- James Iha, Adam Schlesinger: Producers
- Geoff Sanoff, Mike Nesca: Recording and engineering
- Arjun Agerwala, Rudyard Lee Cullers, Adam Tilzer: Assistant engineers
- John Holbrook, Tom Lord-Alge: Mixing
- George Marino: Mastering
