= Chris & Jenna =

American indie pop duo

- Origin: Westminster, Maryland, US
- Genres: Indie pop, power pop, Christian
- Years active: 2009–present
- Members: Chris Badeker; Jenna Badeker
- Website: Facebook site

Chris & Jenna is an American indie piano pop duo from Westminster, Maryland, formed in 2009. The group was founded by Chris Badeker (piano, guitar, vocals) and Jenna Layman (piano, vocals) after college. The band released its first full-length studio album, How the Fall Makes You Feel, in August 2010. The band donates all proceeds from the sale of this album to Compassion International, while acting as advocates for child sponsorship and disaster relief at their live shows. Their second album, Waiting to Begin, was released on May 20, 2014. The album was recorded in Port St. Lucie, Florida, mixed by Shane D. Wilson and mastered by Matthew Odmark of Jars of Clay.

The couple married in 2011.

In January 2018, Chris & Jenna started playing music under the name Wild Harbors.

== Discography ==
- How the Fall Makes You Feel (2010)
- Waiting to Begin (2014)
