= Blink-182 in Concert =

2009–10 concert tour

- Tour by Blink-182
- Promotional poster for the tour
- Location: Europe; North America
- Start date: July 23, 2009
- End date: September 26, 2010
- Legs: 2
- No. of shows: 70
- Supporting acts: The All-American Rejects; Asher Roth; Chester French; Fall Out Boy; Panic! at the Disco; Taking Back Sunday; Weezer; Motion City Soundtrack; Bobby Light; Valencia; The Planet Smashers; illScarlett; The Academy Is...; The Aquabats; Mickey Avalon; Twin Atlantic; All Time Low; Thrice

Blink-182 concert chronology
- European Tour (2004); Blink-182 in Concert (2009–10); 10th Annual Honda Civic Tour (2011)

Blink-182 in Concert (also known as The Summer Tour and the Greatest Hits Tour) was the tenth concert tour by American rock band Blink-182. It began in Las Vegas, Nevada, United States, on July 20, 2009, and concluded in Fontana, California, on September 26, 2010. The tour encompassed 70 shows and visited 11 countries in total. The tour marked the band's return to live performance after a four-year hiatus. The tour featured a rotating roster of supporting acts including Fall Out Boy, Weezer, Panic! at the Disco, The All-American Rejects, Taking Back Sunday, and more.

The band approached the setlist as a retrospective, focusing primarily on established material rather than new songs as they reconnected with audiences. The tour was notable for its elaborate stage design, encompassing large-scale lighting systems, modular video displays, and dynamic moving structures. It also featured an accessible pricing strategy, alongside extensive corporate sponsorship. Musically, the band sought to refine and elevate their live performance, moving toward a more controlled and precise approach compared to their earlier, faster-paced touring style.

The tour was preceded by a surprise reunion performance in Los Angeles that first signaled the band's return. It ultimately began with a two-night kickoff in Las Vegas before moving through North America in dense runs of arena and amphitheatre dates. The trek concluded with West Coast shows in major California markets and was later extended into 2010 with select European festival appearances and additional international dates. In 2009, it was ranked on Pollstar's "Top 50 Tours in North America", earning over $25 million.

== Background ==
The 2009 reunion tour of Blink-182 marked the band’s return to live performance following a four-year hiatus, with the announcement confirming their reformation and a full-scale summer amphitheatre run across North America. The tour was positioned as a major comeback, featuring a rotating lineup of supporting acts described as friends of the band, including Fall Out Boy, Weezer, Panic! at the Disco, The All-American Rejects, Taking Back Sunday, Chester French, and Asher Roth across selected dates. The tour was produced by Live Nation. Bassist/singer Mark Hoppus jokingly referred to the tour as One Way Ticket to Boneville, a name they got from a fan on a KROQ interview.

The tour was notable for its accessible pricing strategy, offering a standardized $20 lawn ticket with no fees for many venues, a move marketed as an attempt to lower barriers for attendance. In addition to the reunion itself, the band emphasized an expanded production scale, collaborating with high-profile stage designers to create a more ambitious visual presentation featuring elaborate multimedia elements. The stage was designed by Martin Phillips, who had recently worked with artists like Daft Punk and Kanye West. It featured massive lighting rigs, modular video screens, and constantly shifting structural elements.

The band approached the setlist as a way to re-establish their live identity before returning to the studio, prioritizing familiar material over anything new. The tour also included an extensive range of limited-edition merchandise, including city-specific T-shirts capped at 182 units per show, collectible posters, and "Blink bunny" rabbit toys tied to their long-running band mascot. Presenting sponsors of the tour included T-Mobile Sidekick LX, State Farm, and MySpace. The tour also marked a major shift in the band's live performance, as it was the first time they regularly played in sync with click tracks tied to lighting and production cues. In an interview, drummer Travis Barker acknowledged that earlier tours were often played significantly faster than studio recordings and without formal timing aids, whereas the reunion era embraced click tracks as a tool for cohesion between performance and large-scale production elements. Guitarist Tom DeLonge said the band were approaching rehearsing for the outing more seriously than in the past. Footage from across the tour was filmed by Los Angeles production company Handsome Randsome for use in a documentary about the band's reunion, The Blinkumentary, that was ultimately shelved.

The tour was first teased with an unannounced three-song concert at the T-Mobile Sidekick launch in Los Angeles, their first performance after the hiatus. The tour was first announced on May 13, 2009. In 2010, the tour was expanded into Europe, comprising 14 dates across August and September 2010, including headlining slots at Reading and Leeds. The tour formally concluded with the band's appearance at Epicenter 2010, in Fontana, California. The band joined the festival as their only Stateside show of that year due to its association with KROQ, and that it personally felt like a logical conclusion to their early reunion touring.

== Reception ==
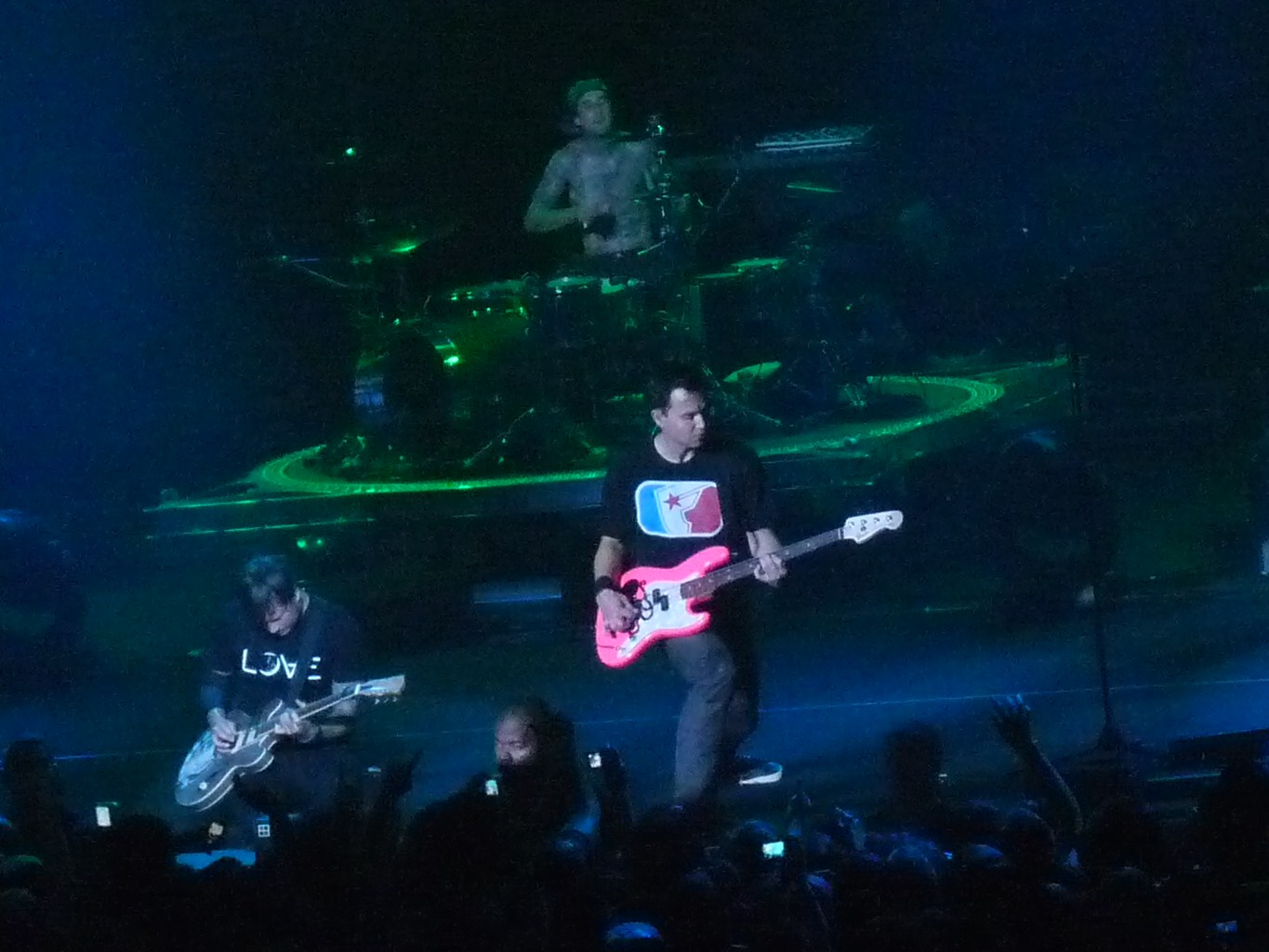
The band performing at the opening stop in Las Vegas.

The tour featured ticket prices ranging from $20 to $70. The North American leg of the tour grossed $21.2 million, selling out 22 of the 41 dates. The success of the tour surpassed the band's expectations. It was the largest shows of the band's career to that point, with 8,000-seat venues selling out immediately and many dates expanding to arenas accommodating 20,000 to 30,000 fans. He attributed the demand to both nostalgia and the band's enduring appeal, remarking that audiences "just wanted to have fun" and reconnect with the group's music.

At the Las Vegas opener, Jason Bracelin of Spin called the gig a "prolonged rim shot," while observing "there has always been an almost child-like vulnerability and tender-skinned emotiveness at the core of the band." Evan C. Jones at Billboard reviewing the band's Madison Square Garden shows, called the set ferocious, praising the showmanship of Barker, "thrusting his signature, kinetic flourishes onto the drum kit." Ross Raihala of Pioneer Press, summing up the Minneapolis show, observed that "Blink-182 played like the past five years had passed in a mere blink of an eye."

In St. Louis, Matthew Fernandes of the Post-Dispatch called "Blink's playing was adequate if not spectacular." The Orange County Register's Ben Wener considered Weezer the better of the pairing, and wrote in a scathing review that "Blink is still one of the most overrated and unnecessary bands of its generation. Were it not for Barker’s tremendous skill behind the drum kit, the San Diego trio would be no better than any number of Warped Tour has-beens."

== Opening acts ==
- The All-American Rejects (North America, select dates)
- Asher Roth (North America, select dates)
- Chester French (North America, select dates)
- Fall Out Boy (North America, select dates)
- Panic! at the Disco (North America, select dates)
- Taking Back Sunday (North America, select dates)
- Weezer (North America, select dates)
- Motion City Soundtrack (Las Vegas)
- Bobby Light (Las Vegas—July 23)
- Valencia (Las Vegas—July 23, Charlotte, Atlanta)
- The Planet Smashers (Montreal)
- illScarlett (Toronto—August 8)
- The Academy Is... (Maryland Heights)
- The Aquabats (Los Angeles, Santa Barbara)
- Mickey Avalon (Los Angeles)
- Twin Atlantic (Aberdeen, Glasgow and Dublin)
- All Time Low (Hamburg)
- Thrice (Hamburg)

== Set list ==
The set list for the tour was designed as a career-spanning showcase that emphasized the band's most recognizable and commercially successful material, structured to function as a "greatest hits" reintroduction following their five-year hiatus.

1. "Dumpweed"
2. "Feeling This"
3. "The Rock Show"
4. "Easy Target" or "Go"
5. "What's My Age Again?"
6. "Obvious" or "Violence"
7. "I Miss You"
8. "Stay Together for the Kids"
9. "Down"
10. "Always"
11. "Stockholm Syndrome"
12. "First Date"
13. "Man Overboard"
14. "Going Away to College" or "Don't Leave Me"
15. "Not Now"
16. "All the Small Things"
17. "Adam's Song" (July 23–August 27)
18. "Reckless Abandon"
19. "Josie"
20. "Anthem Part Two"
  Encore
21. "Untitled I" (Instrumental Interlude)
22. "Carousel"
23. "Dammit"

== Tour dates ==
List of 2009 concerts
| Date | City | Country | Venue |
|---|---|---|---|
| July 23, 2009 | Las Vegas | United States | The Joint |
| July 24, 2009 | Las Vegas | United States | The Joint |
| July 28, 2009 | Vancouver | Canada | General Motors Place |
| July 30, 2009 | Calgary | Canada | Pengrowth Saddledome |
| July 31, 2009 | Edmonton | Canada | Rexall Place |
| August 1, 2009 | Saskatoon | Canada | Credit Union Centre |
| August 2, 2009 | Winnipeg | Canada | MTS Centre |
| August 4, 2009 | Milwaukee | United States | Marcus Amphitheater |
| August 6, 2009 | Mansfield | United States | Comcast Center |
| August 7, 2009 | Montreal | Canada | Bell Centre |
| August 8, 2009 | Toronto | Canada | Molson Amphitheatre |
| August 9, 2009 | Wantagh | United States | Nikon at Jones Beach Theater |
| August 12, 2009 | Hershey | United States | Hersheypark Stadium |
| August 13, 2009 | Cincinnati | United States | Riverbend Music Center |
| August 14, 2009 | Burgettstown | United States | Post-Gazette Pavilion |
| August 15, 2009 | Tinley Park | United States | First Midwest Bank Amphitheatre |
| August 16, 2009 | Council Bluffs | United States | Westfair Amphitheatre |
| August 18, 2009 | Saint Paul | United States | Xcel Energy Center |
| August 20, 2009 | Noblesville | United States | Verizon Wireless Music Center |
| August 21, 2009 | Darien | United States | Darien Lake Performing Arts Center |
| August 22, 2009 | Clarkston | United States | DTE Energy Music Theatre |
| August 23, 2009 | Toronto | Canada | Molson Amphitheatre |
| August 25, 2009 | Wantagh | United States | Nikon at Jones Beach Theater |
| August 26, 2009 | Holmdel Township | United States | PNC Bank Arts Center |
| August 27, 2009 | Camden | United States | Susquehanna Bank Center |
| August 29, 2009 | Hartford | United States | Comcast Theatre |
| August 30, 2009^{[A]} | Columbia | United States | Merriweather Post Pavilion |
| September 4, 2009^{[B]} | Bonner Springs | United States | Capitol Federal Park at Sandstone |
| September 6, 2009 | Greenwood Village | United States | Fiddler's Green Amphitheatre |
| September 7, 2009 | Orem | United States | McKay Events Center |
| September 9, 2009 | Portland | United States | Veterans Memorial Coliseum |
| September 10, 2009 | Auburn | United States | White River Amphitheatre |
| September 12, 2009 | Wheatland | United States | Sleep Train Amphitheatre |
| September 13, 2009 | Mountain View | United States | Shoreline Amphitheatre |
| September 14, 2009 | Bakersfield | United States | Rabobank Arena |
| September 16, 2009 | Chula Vista | United States | Cricket Wireless Amphitheatre |
| September 17, 2009 | Irvine | United States | Verizon Wireless Amphitheatre |
| September 18, 2009 | Irvine | United States | Verizon Wireless Amphitheatre |
| September 19, 2009 | Tempe | United States | Tempe Beach Park Amphitheatre |
| September 21, 2009 | Albuquerque | United States | Journal Pavilion |
| September 23, 2009 | Dallas | United States | SuperPages.com Center |
| September 24, 2009 | The Woodlands | United States | Cynthia Woods Mitchell Pavilion |
| September 26, 2009 | West Palm Beach | United States | Cruzan Amphitheatre |
| September 27, 2009 | Tampa | United States | Ford Amphitheatre |
| September 28, 2009 | Pelham | United States | Verizon Wireless Music Center |
| September 29, 2009 | Maryland Heights | United States | Verizon Wireless Amphitheater |
| September 30, 2009 | Cuyahoga Falls | United States | Blossom Music Center |
| October 2, 2009 | Virginia Beach | United States | Verizon Wireless Amphitheater |
| October 3, 2009 | Atlantic City | United States | Borgata Event Center |
| October 4, 2009 | New York City | United States | Madison Square Garden |
| October 6, 2009 | Charlotte | United States | Verizon Wireless Amphitheatre |
| October 7, 2009 | Atlanta | United States | Aaron's Amphitheatre at Lakewood |
| October 10, 2009 | Los Angeles | United States | Hollywood Palladium |
| October 12, 2009 | Santa Barbara | United States | Santa Barbara Bowl |

List of 2010 concerts
| Date | City | Country | Venue |
|---|---|---|---|
| August 16, 2010 | Aberdeen | Scotland | Press & Journal Arena |
| August 17, 2010 | Glasgow | Scotland | Scottish Exhibition and Conference Centre |
| August 19, 2010^{[C]} | Hasselt | Belgium | Kempische Steenweg |
| August 20, 2010^{[D]} | Biddinghuizen | Netherlands | Spijk en Bremerberg |
| August 21, 2010^{[E]} | Lüdinghausen | Germany | Flugplatz Borkenberge |
| August 22, 2010^{[F]} | Leipzig | Germany | Störmthaler See |
| August 24, 2010 | Hamburg | Germany | Trabrennbahn Bahrenfeld |
| August 25, 2010^{[G]} | Übersee | Germany | Almfischer Festivalgelände |
| August 27, 2010^{[H]} | Paris | France | Domaine National de Saint-Cloud |
| August 28, 2010^{[I]} | Leeds | England | Bramham Park |
| August 29, 2010^{[J]} | Reading | England | Little John's Farm |
| August 31, 2010 | Dublin | Ireland | The O_{2} |
| September 3, 2010^{[K]} | Wiesen | Austria | Festivalgelände Wiesen |
| September 4, 2010^{[L]} | Bologna | Italy | Arena Parco Nord |
| September 26, 2010^{[M]} | Fontana | United States | Auto Club Speedway |

Festivals and other miscellaneous performances

^{A} This concert was a part of the "Virgin Mobile FREEFEST"
^{B} This concert was a part of "The Buzz Beach Ball"
^{C} This concert was a part of "Pukkelpop"
^{D} This concert was a part of "Lowlands"
^{E} This concert was a part of the "Area4 Festival"
^{F} This concert was a part of the "Highfield-Festival"
^{G} This concert was a part of "Chiemsee Rocks"

^{H} This concert was a part of "Rock en Seine"
^{I} This concert was a part of the "Leeds Festival"
^{J} This concert was a part of the "Reading Festival"
^{K} This concert was a part of "Two Days a Week"
^{L} This concert was a part of "Independent Days Festival"
^{M} This concert was a part of "Epicenter"

Cancellations and rescheduled shows

| August 31, 2009 | Saratoga Springs, New York | Saratoga Performing Arts Center | Cancelled. |
| September 2, 2009 | Cuyahoga Falls, Ohio | Blossom Music Center | Rescheduled to September 30, 2009 |
| September 3, 2009 | Maryland Heights, Missouri | Verizon Wireless Amphitheater | Rescheduled to September 29, 2009 |
| September 29, 2009 | Atlanta | Aaron's Amphitheatre at Lakewood | Rescheduled to October 7, 2009 |
| October 1, 2009 | Charlotte, North Carolina | Verizon Wireless Amphitheatre | Rescheduled to October 6, 2009 |

=== Box office box score ===
| Venue | City | Tickets sold / available | Gross revenue |
|---|---|---|---|
| The Joint | Las Vegas | 7,878 / 7,878 (100%) | $442,705 |
| Rexall Place | Edmonton | 11,972 / 13,585 (88%) | $673,448 |
| Comcast Center | Mansfield | 19,881 / 19,900 (~100%) | $837,711 |
| Bell Centre | Montreal | 14,767 / 14,767 (100%) | $704,891 |
| Molson Amphitheatre | Toronto | 30,176 / 32,309 (93%) | $1,492,464 |
| Nikon at Jones Beach Theater | Wantagh | 25,114 / 27,749 (90%) | $1,211,775 |
| Hersheypark Stadium | Hershey | 17,108 / 17,981 (95%) | $716,367 |
| Riverbend Music Center | Cincinnati | 20,561 / 20,561 (100%) | $554,292 |
| Post-Gazette Pavilion | Burgettstown | 22,044 / 22,044 (100%) | $645,086 |
| First Midwest Bank Amphitheatre | Tinley Park | 20,630 / 20,630 (100%) | $793,749 |
| Xcel Energy Center | Saint Paul | 11,170 / 14,445 (77%) | $497,244 |
| Verizon Wireless Music Center | Noblesville | 15,358 / 24,680 (62%) | $339,356 |
| Darien Lake Performing Arts Center | Darien | 18,857 / 21,577 (87%) | $535,799 |
| DTE Energy Music Theatre | Clarkston | 15,703 / 15,703 (100%) | $489,037 |
| PNC Bank Arts Center | Holmdel Township | 16,946 / 16,946 (100%) | $616,495 |
| Susquehanna Bank Center | Camden | 25,396 / 25,396 (100%) | $750,219 |
| Comcast Theatre | Hartford | 24,767 / 24,767 (100%) | $688,328 |
| Fiddler's Green Amphitheatre | Greenwood Village | 17,011 / 17,011 (100%) | $497,138 |
| McKay Events Center | Orem | 6,747 / 7,179 (94%) | $303,389 |
| Sleep Train Amphitheatre | Wheatland | 17,073 / 18,500 (92%) | $404,890 |
| Shoreline Amphitheatre | Mountain View | 22,791 / 23,300 (98%) | $616,427 |
| Cricket Wireless Amphitheatre | Chula Vista | 19,602 / 19,602 (100%) | $579,440 |
| Verizon Wireless Amphitheatre | Irvine | 29,874 / 29,874 (100%) | $1,076,082 |
| Journal Pavilion | Albuquerque | 15,277 / 15,277 (100%) | $387,621 |
| SuperPages.com Center | Dallas | 22,464 / 23,112 (97%) | $600,418 |
| Cynthia Woods Mitchell Pavilion | The Woodlands | 16,545 / 16,545 (100%) | $585,930 |
| Cruzan Amphitheatre | West Palm Beach | 19,728 / 19,728 (100%) | $462,668 |
| Ford Amphitheatre | Tampa | 19,477 / 19,514 (~100%) | $552,348 |
| Verizon Wireless Music Center | Pelham | 5,506 / 10,289 (53%) | $181,204 |
| Verizon Wireless Amphitheater | Maryland Heights | 16,377 / 21,000 (78%) | $383,637 |
| Blossom Music Center | Cuyahoga Falls | 17,893 / 20,351 (89%) | $534,683 |
| Verizon Wireless Amphitheater | Virginia Beach | 20,055 / 20,055 (100%) | $499,527 |
| Madison Square Garden | New York City | 14,733 / 14,733 (100%) | $699,740 |
| Verizon Wireless Amphitheatre | Charlotte | 13,048 / 18,808 (69%) | $298,226 |
| Hollywood Palladium | Los Angeles | 3,826 / 3,826 (100%) | $202,714 |
| Santa Barbara Bowl | Santa Barbara | 4,235 / 4,792 (88%) | $213,150 |
| Trabrennbahn Bahrenfeld | Hamburg | 14,734 / 15,000 (98%) | $598,985 |
| The O_{2} | Dublin | 12,552 / 12,552 (100%) | $636,128 |
| TOTAL | | 647,876 / 691,966 (94%) | $22,303,311 |

== Personnel ==
- Mark Hoppus – bass and vocals
- Tom DeLonge – guitar and vocals
- Travis Barker – drums, percussion
