= Plushgun =

American band

- Origin: Brooklyn, New York City, United States
- Genres: Indie rock, new wave, synthpop
- Years active: 2007–present
- Labels: Tommy Boy Entertainment
- Members: Dan Ingala, Taylor Armstrong, Matt Bogdanow
- Past members: Pearson Constantino, Kamuela Kim
- Website: plushgun.com

Plushgun is an American indie rock/new wave/synthpop band founded by Dan Ingala located in Brooklyn, New York, United States. The current lineup of the band is Ingala, Taylor Armstrong on guitar and Matt Bogdanow on drums. The band gained prominence when its music was featured in episodes of the web series We Need Girlfriends and quickly gained an online following.

On May 15, 2008 Plushgun announced a record deal with Tommy Boy Entertainment to release the band's first and self-titled vinyl EP, which was released on August 19, 2008. In a positive review, Orlando Sentinel music critic Jim Abbott wrote that the lead song "Just Impolite" "manages to be breezy and atmospheric" and other tracks "boast plenty of shimmering keyboards, but enough melody to sing along." The music video for "Just Impolite" was directed by celebrity photographer Tyler Shields and starred actresses Brittany Snow and Juno Temple.

Their first album, Pins & Panzers, was released on February 17, 2009. Plushgun was Ourstage's first artist to get signed by a prominent record label after Ourstage flew the band out to South by Southwest music festival where Tommy Boy spotted Plushgun. "Just Impolite" was featured on the MTV show The City on December 29, 2008, the film The Good Guy in 2009 and in a Comcast Xfinity commercial in fall 2010. "How We Roll" was featured on an episode of MTV's The Real World: Brooklyn. Plushgun released their second album Me.Me on May 15, 2012 on iTunes.

In 2010 Plushgun received a Gold Record for a song on the soundtrack to the German film Zweiohrküken.

== Band members ==
- Daniel Ingala – Lead vocals
- Matt Bogdanow – Drums, backing vocals
- Taylor Armstrong – Guitarist

== Discography ==
- Plushgun demos EP (2007)
- Plushgun EP (Tommy Boy, 2008)
- Dancing in a Minefield EP (Tommy Boy, 2008)
- Pins & Panzers (Tommy Boy, February 17, 2009)
- Me.Me. (Tommy Boy, May 15, 2012)

=== Singles ===
- "Just Impolite" (2008, self-released; 2009, Tommy Boy, re-released)
- "Let Me Kiss You Now (And I'll Fade Away)" (2009, Tommy Boy)
- "A Crush To Pass The Time" (2009, Tommy Boy)
- "Waste Away" (2012, Tommy Boy)
- "Lukewarm" (2022, Tommy Boy)
