= J-Kwon =

American rapper

- Born: Jerrell C. Jones; March 28, 1986 (age 40)
- Origin: St. Louis, Missouri, U.S.
- Genres: Midwestern hip-hop
- Occupations: Rapper; songwriter
- Works: J-Kwon discography
- Years active: 2003–present
- Labels: Hood Hop; Gracie; ONE; EMI; Arista; Zomba; Derrty Ent; So So Def

Jerrell C. Jones (born March 28, 1986), known professionally as J-Kwon, is an American rapper. He signed with Jermaine Dupri's So So Def Recordings, an imprint of Arista Records to release his 2004 single "Tipsy", which peaked at number two on the Billboard Hot 100. It served as lead single for his debut studio album Hood Hop (2004), which peaked at number seven on the Billboard 200 and spawned the single "You & Me" (featuring Sadiyyah). The following year, he guest appeared alongside Mike Jones on labelmate Bow Wow's 2005 single, "Fresh Azimiz", which peaked at number 23 on the Billboard Hot 100.

== Life and career ==
At age 12, Jones was expelled from his home for allegedly dealing drugs. He first rose to stardom with the single "Tipsy" from his 2004 album Hood Hop, which peaked at number two on the Billboard 200 on April 17, 2004, after 14 weeks on the chart.. "Tipsy" also performed well globally, peaking within the top ten of the charts in Australia, New Zealand, and the United Kingdom. Other singles included "You & Me" with Sadiyyah and "Hood Hop."

For the 2005 film XXX: State of the Union, J-Kwon performed the single "Get XXX'd" with Petey Pablo and Ebony Eyez. J-Kwon began working on the follow-up to Hood Hop, Louisville Slugger, that same year. He collaborated with comedian Andy Milonakis in "Like Dis", to promote The Andy Milonakis Show, and appeared on Bow Wow's single "Fresh Azimiz". In 2008, he released a single "Boo Boo" through his own label Hood Hop Music with album Hood Hop 2 following the next year exclusively for digital download. Follow-up Hood Hop 2.5 was released on CD on July 28, 2009. Its first official single was "Louie Bounce (I Smacked Nikki)".

In March 2010, J-Kwon's record label, Gracie Entertainment, said that he had been missing since early February 2010. Later the same month, MTV News reported that he had been in touch with the record label, confirming he was alive and well.

J-Kwon released his fourth studio album on March 23, 2010, entitled J-Kwon.

In June 2013, he made a diss track titled "Pushing the Odds" produced by H Snow Beatz towards Odd Future and Pusha T after previous disses from both.

== Discography ==
- Hood Hop (2004)
- Hood Hop 2 (2009)
- Hood Hop 2.5 (2009)
- J-Kwon (2010)
