= Fighting Jacks =

American melodic rock band

- Origin: San Jose, California, United States
- Genres: Melodic rock
- Years active: 2000–2006; 2014–present
- Label: Tooth & Nail Records
- Members: Casey Linstrum; Cory Linstrum; Mike Wright; Gordon Gurley; Nick Tresko
- Past members: Michael Hoppe; Jon Sontag; David Provenzano

Fighting Jacks are a melodic rock band from San Jose, California. The band formed in the fall of 2000 after their former bands broke up that past summer. The original lineup was Casey Linstrum (vocals, guitar), Cory Linstrum (bass, vocals), Michael Hoppe (drums), and Mike Wright (guitar, vocals). This lineup created the base of the Fighting Jacks sound, taking the influences of their former bands and creating a sound that was both aggressive and indie, while also staying catchy and easily accessible. The band has released The Inside Trade Agreement EP and the Split EP with bands Sloe and Keeping Ellis in 2001. They were signed by Tooth & Nail Records and released their first full-length LP The Dying Art of Life in 2003. The band released a S/T EP in 2005 and started writing what would be their second full-length album, but then they went on hiatus from 2007–2014. At the end of 2014 the band reformed and started to finish recording their new album Decade, which was self-released digitally on 7/21/2017. The band is currently starting to remotely work on new music, as the members are now spread out between San Jose, Los Angeles, Seattle, and Marseille, FR.

== History ==
=== Origin ===
Fighting Jacks formed in the fall of 2000 after their former bands, Freeto Boat/Call of Elijah and 2 Car Garage, broke up that summer. The band was started by brothers Casey Linstrum, Cory Linstrum and Michael Hoppe. The three-piece band played a few local shows under pseudonyms until they asked former bandmate Mike Wright to join as lead guitarist and solidified Fighting Jacks as a four-piece. This lineup created the base of the Fighting Jacks sound, taking their punk rock, post-hardcore and alternative rock influences of their former bands and creating a sound that was dark, melodic, yet hopeful and uplifting that was unique and powerful.

== 2000-2003 ==
=== The Inside Trade Agreement (2001) ===
Throughout the fall and winter of 2000/2001 the band wrote and recorded their first EP The Inside Trade Agreement. The EP was recorded at J31 Studios with producer/engineer Gordon Gurley in San Jose, CA. The 5-song EP was released in the summer of 2001 and quickly helped the band become a south Bay Area favorite. Their song "Your Lurking Shadow" started receiving radio play on local radio station Live 105 and helped the Fighting Jacks get onto larger bay area shows, opening for national acts including Live 105's annual BFD concert. The band started playing all over the West Coast throughout the year as well as continuing to write new music for their upcoming releases.

=== Split EP (2002) ===
At the end of 2001 Fighting Jacks co-self-released the Split EP with fellow San Jose bands Sloe and Keeping Ellis. The EP consisted of two new songs from each of the three bands, who were all good friends and who often played shows and toured together between 2000–2005. The EP was recorded at J31 Studios by producer/engineer Gordon Gurley in San Jose, CA.

=== The Dying Art of Life (2003) ===
2002 saw the band continuing to tour throughout the west coast and were signed to Seattle indie label Tooth & Nail Records. The band eventually recorded their first full-length LP The Dying Art of Life in the winter of 2002/2003 with producer Sylvia Massy at RadioStar Studios in Weed, CA. Following the recording sessions, drummer Michael Hoppe decided to leave the band and was quickly replaced by Jon Sontag, formerly of local San Jose band Fan Five (and current member of Bay Area bands Angeles and Northern Son). The band played and toured nationally for the rest of the year in preparation for the release of their first full-length record.

== 2003-2007 ==
The Dying Art of Life album was released worldwide in October 2003 and at this time the band started touring full-time in support of the record. The winter of 2004 saw drummer Jon Sontag leave the band to pursue other interests. David Provenzano of local south bay bands For the Design and The Northeast, filled in on drums for a couple tours before finally joining the band as their permanent drummer. The band toured nationally between 2001–2007, including playing Cornerstone Festival in (2003 & 2004), TOMfest (2001-2006), Warped Tour (2004), Live 105's BFD (2002), and Joshua Fest in 2006.

=== S/T EP (2005) ===
The Fighting Jacks self-released their third EP, S/T EP 2005 in the summer of 2005. The 5-song release was recorded with DJ KTA at Sound MGT Studios in Campbell, CA and was mixed and mastered by Gordon Gurley at J31 Studios in San Jose, CA. This was an independent limited release that only had a few thousand pressings, but is now available on their Bandcamp page.

=== Hiatus, other bands, projects ===
At the end of 2006 Fighting Jacks decided to take a break from playing live and began writing demoing for their second full-length album. David Provenzano left the band to play guitar for the southern California band Sherwood (Myspace Records) and went on to start his own bands Fialta and Margot Polo. Casey Linstrum released a solo album entitled Northbound and toured throughout 2008-2009 for that release. Mike Wright started a solo electronica project called Nugent, a San Jose heavy rock band called Mercy High, and a "metal" influenced project called Ironside with Cory Linstrum and David Mast of Echocast fame that has yet to release any material.

== 2014-current ==
After their long hiatus, Fighting Jacks reformed at the end of 2014 and started to finish recording their second full-length record. With new members Gordon Gurley (drums, production) and Nick Tresko (keys, guitars) now in the fold, the band was reinvigorated and started to prepare for live shows and finished up their new album, Decade, which was self-released on 7/21/2017. The band is currently playing live locally in the San Francisco Bay Area. Fighting Jacks have also recently released all of their old out-of-print EPs on their Bandcamp page.

=== Decade (2017) ===
Decade is Fighting Jacks second full-length record. It was recorded by Jerry Ososkie and mixed/ mastered by Gordon Gurley, once again, at the infamous J31 Studios in San Jose, CA. David Provenzano wrote and played drums on the album. This 11-track record is the band's second full-length release and their first since 2005. They release a 2-song single of the album's songs "In Your Glory" and "Fade; Decay" on 4/23/2017 on their Bandcamp page in promotion for the upcoming full-length release. Decade is available on all digital formats as of 7/21/2017.

== Members ==
=== Current ===
- Casey Linstrum - lead vocals, rhythm guitar
- Cory Linstrum - bass, backing vocals
- Mike Wright - lead guitar
- David Provenzano - drums (2004-2012, 2022)
- Nick Tresko - keyboards, synths, rhythm guitar

=== Former ===
- Michael Hoppe - drums (2000-2003)
- Jon Sontag - drums (2003-2004)
- Gordon Gurley - drums (2015-2017)

== Releases ==
- The Inside Trade Agreement - 2001
- Split EP - 2002
- The Dying Art of Life - 2003
- S/T EP - 2005
- Decade - 2017
