= Love and Fear =

Love and Fear may refer to:

== Music ==
- Love and Fear (album), a 1999 album by Jimmy Barnes
- Love + Fear, a 2019 album by Marina
  - Love + Fear (Acoustic), a 2019 EP by Marina featuring acoustic versions of songs from the previous album
- Love and Fear, a 2012 album by We Shot the Moon
- "Love and Fear", a 2017 song by Imelda May on the deluxe edition of Life Love Flesh Blood
- Love & Fear, a 2025 album by Zac Brown Band

== Other ==
- Love and Fear (film), a 1988 film directed by Margarethe von Trotta

== See also ==
- Fear and Love, a 2008 album by We Shot the Moon
