= Polysics or Die!!!! =

Polysics Or Die!!!!

Compilation album by Polysics
- Released: May 2004
- Genre: J-Rock
- Label: Ki/oon Records (Japan); Tofu Records (US); Sur La Plage (UK)
- Producer: Polysics

Polysics chronology
National P (2004)	Polysics Or Die!!!! (2004)	Now Is the Time! (2006)

Professional ratings
Review scores
Source	Rating
Allmusic	4/5 stars
Pitchfork Media	8.2/10

Polysics Or Die!!!! is the first greatest hits album by Japanese band Polysics. It is their first release in the United Kingdom; it was later released in the U.S. and Japan. The name is likely a reference to the album Music Industrial Wastes〜P-MODEL OR DIE by P-Model, a band whom Polysics is heavily influenced by.

== Track listing ==
1. "Buggie Technica" (new recording)
2. "Hot Stuff" (new recording)
3. "New Wave Jacket" (from the single "New Wave Jacket")
4. "Plus Chicker" (new recording)
5. "Kaja Kaja Goo" (from the Kaja Kaja Goo EP)
6. "Black Out Fall Out" (new recording)
7. "My Sharona" (from the album For Young Electric Pop)
8. "Making Sense" (from the album NEU)
9. "Lookin’ Lookin’ Gaa" (from the album National P)
10. "Commodoll" (from the album ENO)
11. "For Young Electric Pop" (from the album For Young Electric Pop)
12. "XCT" (from the album NEU)
13. "Peach Pie on the Beach" (from the album National P)
14. "Each Life Each End" (from the single "Each Life Each End")
15. "Code 4" (from the mini album Lo-bits)
16. "Modern" (new recording)
17. "Urge On !!" (from the single "XCT")
18. "ENO" (from the album ENO)
19. "Black Out Fall Out" (bonus video, UK only)
20. "Kaja Kaja Goo" (bonus video, UK only)

== Polysics Or Die!!!! Vista ==
After Polysics signed to MySpace Records, a revised version of Polysics or Die!!!! was released in the US, under the name Polysics or Die!!!! Vista. It included the latest singles from Karate House and a bonus DVD of videos and live cuts. Polysics or Die!!!! Vista was released on October 9, 2007, to mark the band's ten-year anniversary.

=== Track listing ===
1. "Electric Surfin' Go Go" (from the album Karate House)
2. "New Wave Jacket (Reform)" (from the album Eno)
3. "Baby Bias" (from the album Now is the time)
4. "Go Ahead Now!" (from the album Neu)
5. "Kaja Kaja Goo" (from the EP Kaja Kaja Goo)
6. "I My Me Mine" (from the album Now is the Time)
7. "You-You-You" (from the album Karate House)
8. "Catch On Everywhere" (from the album Karate House)
9. "Coelakanth Is Android" (from the single "Coelakanth is Android")
10. "My Sharona" (from the album For Young Electric Pop)
11. "Black Out Fall Out" (new recording from POLYSICS OR DIE!!!!)
12. "Shizuka Is A Machine Doctor" (from the album Karate House)
13. "Tei! Tei! Tei!" (from the album Now is the Time)
14. "Each Life Each End" (from the single "Each Life Each End")
15. "New Wave Outline" (from the album Karate House)
16. "Peach Pie On the Beach" (from the album National P)
17. "Secret Candy" (vinyl only from the album For Young Electric Pop)
18. "Domo Arigato Mr. Roboto" (vinyl only cover song from the mini album Lo-Bits)
