= Some Things Never Leave You =

Studio album by Sherwood
- Released: June 17, 2016
- Recorded: September–November 2015
- Genre: Rock
- Length: 44:34
- Label: BC Music
- Producer: Luke Vander Pol & Dan Koch

Sherwood chronology
QU (2009)	Some Things Never Leave You (2016)

Some Things Never Leave You (STNLY) is the fourth studio album by American alternative rock band Sherwood. The album was released on June 17, 2016.

== Background ==
After a four-year hiatus, Sherwood returned in September 2015 with the announcement of a new album. Free from a recording contract, Sherwood financed the album via a crowdfunding campaign and released STNLY through the BC Music label.

=== Recording ===
Producer Luke Vander Pol (upper left) and Dan Koch (right) at Studio Litho in Seattle, WA.

Koch recording electric guitar at Studio Litho.

Ed Brooks mastering Some Things Never Leave You at RFI Mastering in Seattle, Washington

Featuring original members Nate Henry, Dan Koch and Joe Greenetz, STNLY was recorded in late 2015 at various studios in Seattle, WA, including Stone Gossard's Studio Litho, as well as the studios of producer Luke Vander Pol and guitarist/songwriter Koch. The tracks were mixed by Matt Goldman in Atlanta, GA and mastered by Ed Brooks at RFI Mastering in Seattle. It is Sherwood's first album without longtime keyboardist Mike Leibovich.

== Reception ==
Professional ratings
Review scores
Source	Rating
HM Magazine	4.5/5 stars
The Meltdown Music	4.5/5 stars
jesusfreakhideout.com	4.5/5 stars

Upon its release, Some Things Never Leave You received critical praise, with reviewers noting its songwriting, performances, and ability to cover new (for the band) sonic territory while retaining the youthful earnestness of Sherwood's work from the early-to-mid-2000s.

== Track listing ==
No.	Title	Length
1.	"Outside/In"	3:52
2.	"Closer to You"	3:08
3.	"Little Bit Better"	4:03
4.	"New Year’s Eve"	4:38
5.	"Back Home"	6:09
6.	"Bottle It Up"	2:51
7.	"Together Alone"	3:07
8.	"Believe"	3:28
9.	"The First"	4:07
10.	"Old Ways"	4:03
11.	"The Unknown"	5:08

== Charts ==
Chart (2016)	Peak position
Independent Albums (Billboard)	26
Rock Albums (Billboard)	42
