= Fear and Love =

Studio album by We Shot the Moon
- Released: April 29, 2008
- Recorded: 2007
- Genre: Piano rock, alternative rock
- Length: 44:06
- Label: The Militia Group
- Producer: Dan Koch; Jonathan Jones

We Shot the Moon chronology
The Polar Bear and Cougar EP (2007)	Fear and Love (2008)	A Silver Lining (2009)

Professional ratings
Review scores
Source	Rating
The Tune	(A−)
The Album Project	4/5 stars
AllMusic	3.5/5 stars

Fear and Love is the debut LP by the San Diego rock band We Shot the Moon, made up of Jonathan Jones of Waking Ashland, and Dan Koch and Joe Greenetz both of Sherwood. It was released to iTunes on April 1, 2008, and in stores on April 29, 2008. The band hinted at a few key shows (particularly in Rexburg, Idaho) in the mountain west that the album would "leak" to the internet on Friday, January 18, 2008. The downloading service hit its limit of downloads that day, however the album is still available through various other websites and file sharing services.

The album cover was the result of a design contest held by the band, letting the fans decide what the cover would look like.

== Track listing ==
1. Water's Edge (2:33)
2. Sway Your Head (3:16)
3. LTFP (4:08)
4. Faces (3:09)
5. Perfect Time (4:00)
6. Tunnel Vision (3:35)
7. Julie (3:12)
8. On Your Way (3:51)
9. Hope (4:13)
10. Upon Waking She Found Herself a Cougar (3:45)
11. In the Blue (4:02)
12. Please Shine (4:22)
