= 99 Times =

Single by Kate Voegele

from the album A Fine Mess
- Released: April 14, 2009
- Genre: Pop rock, alternative rock
- Length: 3:28
- Label: MySpace/Interscope
- Songwriter(s): Kate Voegele, Teddy Scott, Elle Stamos
- Producer(s): Mike Elizondo, Teddy Scott

Kate Voegele singles chronology
| "Manhattan from the Sky" (2009) | "99 Times" (2009) |

Music video
- "99 Times" (Official video) on YouTube

"99 Times" is the second official single from singer-songwriter Kate Voegele's second studio album, A Fine Mess.

== Music video ==
The music video starts with Voegele lying in bed, listening to the song on headphones. She is also playing the song with her band. Then she starts to sing to many men, including Derek Hough, who do not respond. She also takes off various articles of clothing that the men wear, including hats and scarves. At the end, she kisses Hough and then knocks him down, causing him to knock the others down like dominoes, and they form a 99.

Promotion for 99 Times included a 10-second advertisement in the music video of Paparazzi by American singer-songwriter, Lady Gaga. This can be seen in the explicit version on YouTube, adding on an extra 10 seconds at the beginning with shots of Voegele’s video.

== Track listing ==
Digital download

1. "99 Times" – 3:28

== Charts ==
| Chart (2009) | Peak position |
|---|---|
| Canadian Hot 100 | 58 |
| U.S. Billboard Bubbling Under Hot 100 | 8 |
| U.S. Billboard Adult Top 40 | 22 |
