= A Different Light (album) =

Studio album by Sherwood
- Released: March 1, 2007 (digital); March 13, 2007 (retail)
- Genre: Rock
- Length: 49:15
- Label: MySpace
- Producer: Lou Giordano

Sherwood chronology
Summer EP (2006)	A Different Light (2007)	Not Gonna Love EP (2009)

Professional ratings
Review scores
Source	Rating
AbsolutePunk.net	76%
Sputnikmusic	3/5 stars
The Tune	B+

A Different Light is the second album by Sherwood, and it continues the band's musical style. The album contains several re-recorded versions of tracks off their Summer EP (2006), as well as new tracks that help the band drift into new musical territory. It is the first album since the band signed with MySpace Records, and was preceded by several 'Making of' videos available on the band's MySpace page. The song "The Best in Me" was used as the opening song for MTV's show College Life.

== Track listing ==
No.	Title	Length
1.	"Song in My Head"	3:50
2.	"The Best in Me"	4:21
3.	"Middle of the Night"	3:31
4.	"For the Longest Time"	4:00
5.	"Home"	4:14
6.	"Alley Cat"	4:09
7.	"Give Up!"	3:35
8.	"Never Ready to Leave"	3:30
9.	"The Only Song"	3:15
10.	"Alive"	3:41
11.	"The Simple Life"	3:01
12.	"A Different Light"	3:06
13.	"I'm Asking Her to Stay" (features violin solo by Joanna Giordano and cello accompaniment by Caro Giordano)	5:02
