= Karate House =

KARATE HOUSE

Studio album by Polysics
- Released: February 28, 2007 Japan; August 26, 2008 USA
- Genre: New wave
- Labels: Ki/oon Records Japan; MySpace Records USA
- Producer: Polysics

Polysics chronology
Now Is the Time! (2005)	KARATE HOUSE (2007)	We Ate the Machine (2008)

KARATE HOUSE is the seventh full-length album by Japanese band Polysics. "Electric Surfin' Go Go", "You-You-You" and "Catch On Everywhere" were released as singles in Japan. The song "POLYSICS OR DIE!!!!" is structured very similarly to "Jocko Homo" by Devo, who are Polysics' major influence. The song "THE GREAT BRAIN" is a cover of a P-MODEL song, another great influence, from their 1979 debut IN A MODEL ROOM, and the song "POLYSICS OR DIE!!!!" is a reference to their 1999 album Music Industrial Wastes〜P-MODEL OR DIE.

== Track listing ==
All tracks are written by Hiroyuki Hayashi, except where noted.

No.	Title	Lyrics	Music	Length
1.	"Watson" (ワトソン Watoson)			2:33
2.	"Electric Surfin' Go Go"			3:39
3.	"New Wave Hotline" (ニューウェーブ電話相談室 Nyū Wēbu Denwa Sōdanshitsu)		Hayashi, Fumi	2:10
4.	"Catch On Everywhere"	Hayashi, Fumi		3:52
5.	"Hard Rock Thunder" (ハードロックサンダー Hādo Rokku Sandā)			2:47
6.	"THE GREAT BRAIN" (偉大なる頭脳 Idainaru Zunō)	Susumu Hirasawa	Fumiyasu Abe (uncredited), Hirasawa	2:00
7.	"Zuper Man" (ズーバーマン Zūbāman)		Hayashi, Fumi	2:35
8.	"Ashes of Life" (人生の灰 Jinsei no Hai)	Fumi	Fumi	2:36
9.	"My Girl's a Cyborg" (サイボーグ彼女 Saibōgu Kanojo)		Hayashi, Fumi	2:43
10.	"Akai Master" (赤いマスター Akai Masutā)	Hayashi, Fumi	Hayashi, Fumi	2:19
11.	"Dream Programmed" (夢・打ち込み Yume·Uchikomi)	Hayashi, Fumi	Hayashi, Fumi	2:47
12.	"Professional Tennis" (プロテニス Puro Tenisu)		Hayashi, Fumi	2:01
13.	"Always Happiness" (オールウェイズハピネス Ōruweizu Hapinesu)		Hayashi, Fumi	3:05
14.	"Shizuka is a machine doctor"			2:40
15.	"You-You-You"			3:42
16.	"POLYSICS OR DIE!!!!"			3:40
Total length:				45:09
