= Polysics =

Japanese rock band

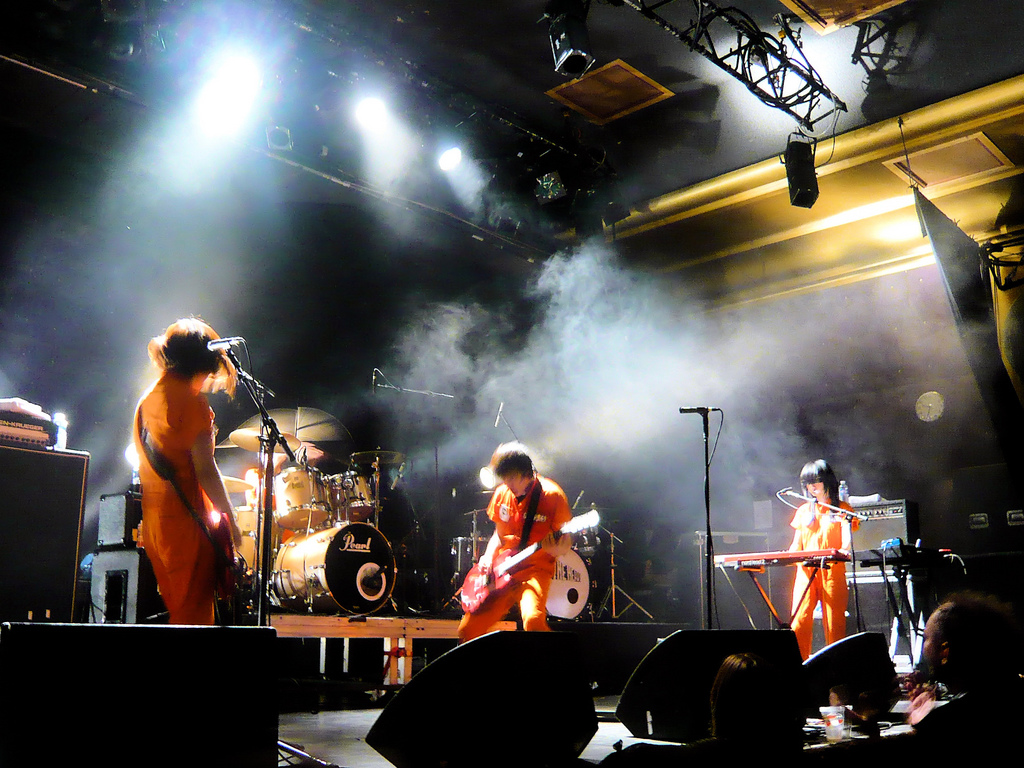
- Polysics live in France 2008

Background information
- Origin: Tokyo, Japan
- Genres: New wave; synthpop; art pop; electropunk; post-punk revival; electronic rock; hardcore punk; geek rock
- Years active: 1997–present
- Labels: Ki/oon (Japan); Myspace (U.S.); Okami, JPU Records (Europe)
- Members: Hiroyuki Hayashi; Fumi; Masashi Yano
- Past members: Junichi Sugai; Sako Eisuke; Kaneko Shingo; Kayo; Ryo Nakamura
- Website: www.polysics.com

Polysics (ポリシックス, Porishikkusu; typeset POLYSICS) is a Japanese new wave/electronic rock band from Tokyo, who dubs its unique style as "technicolor pogo punk". It was named after a brand of synthesizer, the Korg Polysix. The band started in 1997, but got their big break in 1998 at a concert in Tokyo. They create high energy music, fusing conventional guitar music with synthesized and computer generated sound to create a unique mixture of punk and synthpop heavily inspired by the American bands Devo and the Tubes, as well as Japanese bands such as P-Model and Yellow Magic Orchestra. Their song lyrics often consist of Japanese, English, or even gibberish. The band has been noted for their extremely energetic live performances and their wild gimmicky outfits, notably their straight-bar sunglasses and trademark orange boiler suits stamped with a simple "P".

== History ==
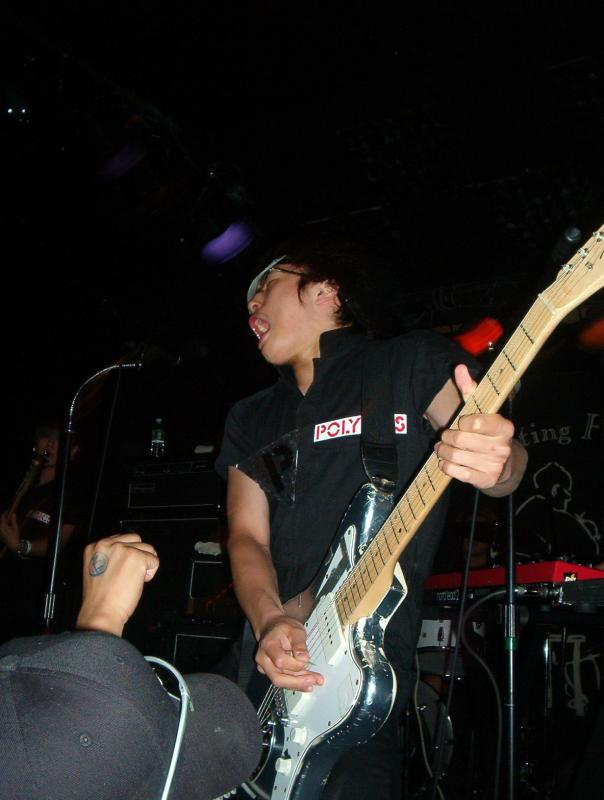
Hiroyuki Hayashi plays guitar at a POLYSICS live show in 2003, supporting the US release of the album Neu

Polysics was formed in 1997 by Japanese high-school student Hiroyuki Hayashi. After watching some live footage of Devo and becoming inspired by new wave music of the West, Hayashi quit his soccer team and formed a band to expand on the cartoonish image and musical ideas of the zany art-punk icons he had seen on TV. He was joined by drummer Junichi Sugai and Sako (aka Poly 2). Another member named Kaneko joined within the early years of the band, but he left and was soon replaced by Kayo. Kayo's mechanical stage presence provided an asymmetrical dynamic to the frenetic antics of the other three members. The name of the band derives from the first synthesizer owned by Hayashi, the Korg Polysix. This synth appears in two of their early music videos.

In 1999, Polysics released their first albums 1st P and A.D.S.R.M! on the independent label DECKREC Records. Just after the release of 1st P their bassist, known only as "POLY-2", left. The band dropped the "POLY-X" names, and reduced to a trio, with new member Fumi on Bass Support on some of the tracks from Neu. In 1999, Asian Man Records released their US debut album, Hey! Bob! My Friend! to rave reviews, but weak sales. The album was a compilation of tracks from their first two Japanese releases. In 2000, Polysics signed to Ki/oon Records (a subsidiary of Sony Music Japan Inc.) and released their first major album Neu. The album carried with it the same manic energy as their independent releases but more refined. On the 2001 album Eno, synthesizers became more prevalent in the mix, but the songs still had an intense punk-like energy. For this album, Fumi applied as a full member, returning Polysics to a quartet. 2002 saw the release of the album For Young Electric Pop, Polysics' attempt at a pop album. The manic punk energy was minimized, but the band showed it had an amazing sense of harmony and style.

In 2003, Neu was released in the United States on Asian Man Records to rave reviews and great sales. However, shortly after recording the Kaja Kaja Goo EP drummer Junichi Sugai left the band. Ishimaru (drummer for the punk group Snail Ramp) temporarily joined as a replacement. For the 2003 album National P, Polysics went to the US to tour, which was then captured on the PippikkippippiP In USA DVD.

Also during 2003, Polysics appeared on UK television for the programme Adam & Joe Go Tokyo performing "Kaja Kaja Goo".

In 2004, Polysics released a greatest hits compilation titled Polysics or Die!!!! in Europe and the United States. Yano had also replaced Sugai as the new drummer for the band in this year. Polysics toured Europe and the US for the 2005 US Release of Polysics or Die!!!!. With the early 2006 release of Now Is the Time!, they toured the US and the UK, supporting high-profile UK artists such as Graham Coxon and Kaiser Chiefs.

On February 28, 2007 Polysics released their album Karate House in Japan.

Following this Polysics signed for MySpace Records making plans to re-release Polysics or Die!!!! in the US, with the inclusion of the latest singles from Karate House and a bonus DVD of videos and live cuts. Polysics or Die!!!! Vista was released on October 9, 2007 for Myspace Records exclusively for the United States, to mark the band's ten-year anniversary. Hayashi did a remix of the "Teen Titans Theme" by JPop group Puffy AmiYumi. The song "Teen Titans Theme ~POLYSICS' CR-06 MIX~" appears on their US album Splurge.

On April 23, 2008, We Ate the Machine was released in Japan. It was released on September 30, 2008 in North America.

In their newsletter it was announced that Kayo's last day with Polysics would be March 14, 2010, the day of their huge Nippon Budokan concert. She says that she has spent happy and quality time with the band, but she wants to live on as a woman and not a musician.

Their Budokan concert, BUDOKAN OR DIE!!!! 2010.3.14, was released on July 7, 2010 on both DVD and Blu-ray.

On August 8, 2010 they came back from their hiatus during the Rock in Japan Festival as a trio in brand new outfits and visors.

They covered Buck-Tick's "Sid Vicious on the Beach" for Parade II -Respective Tracks of Buck-Tick-, released on July 4, 2012.

In 2018, Polysics started a side project called The Vocoders, with a presentation modeled off Kraftwerk.

== Influences ==
In Hiroyuki's words, Polysics is inspired by "the spirit of Devo." Obvious references to Devo have been made in Polysics videos, and songs. The band has also covered "Jerking Back And Forth", "Social Fools", "Secret Agent Man" and on their 15th anniversary album, 15th P, Devo front man, Mark Mothersbaugh joined the band to perform a new version of "Mecha-Mania Boy". Polysics have also creatively repurposed Devo and other new wave/punk material in their own original songs; for instance, in the song "Each Life Each End" from the album "Neu" they borrow the opening riff from the Devo song "Girl U Want" (along with a sample from "Love Missile F1-11" by Sigue Sigue Sputnik), and the lyrics are playfully paraphrased from Devo's "The Day My Baby Gave Me A Surprise" and "Red Eye Express." The tributes even extend to the album art; in a miniposter included with the album "National P", the members of Polysics are shown seated around a picnic blanket, about to eat cakes shaped like Devo's famous red Energy Dome headgear. In addition, the giant robot mascot from the cover of their "Lo-Bits" EP sports a battle helmet that resembles the same iconic dome.

While Polysics claim Devo as their most prevalent influence, other bands and artists that have influenced their music, are occasionally referenced in their album or song titles, and whose music has sometime been repurposed in similar ways include Neu!, Brian Eno, XTC, Yellow Magic Orchestra, P-Model (who they have opened for), Talking Heads, Sparks, The B-52's, King Crimson, Kraftwerk, Denki Groove, Nirvana, Man or Astroman, Spoozys, and David Bowie, Hikashu and Plastics. Polysics have covered songs by Devo, Styx, Suzi Quatro, Plastics, The Ramones, The Knack, Soft Cell, Hikashu, Thin Lizzy, P-Model and Frank Sinatra and have been known to play Yes during their sound checks.

== Members ==
Current members

- Hiroyuki Hayashi – Guitar, vocals, vocoder, programming (1997–present)
- Fumi – Bass guitar, vocals, synthesizer (2001–present; support - 1999-2001)
- Masashi Yano – Drums, vocals (2004–present)

Past members

- Junichi Sugai – Drums (1998-2003)
- Sako Eisuke (aka Poly-2) – Synthesizer, vocoder, concert toast throwing performance (1997-1999)
- Kaneko Shingo – Synthesizer (1997)
- Kayo – Synthesizer, vocals, vocoder (1998-2010)
- Ryo Nakamura - Guitar, vocals, synthesizers (2017–2020)

Touring musicians

- Ishimaru – Drums (2003-2004)

== Discography ==
=== Albums ===
- 1st P - 1999
- A.D.S.R.M! - 1999
- Neu - 2000
- Eno - 2001
- For Young Electric Pop - 2002
- National P - 2003
- Now Is the Time! - 2005
- Karate House - 2007
- We Ate the Machine - 2008
- Absolute Polysics - 2009
- Oh! No! It's Heavy Polysick!!! - 2011
- 15th P - 2012
- Weeeeeeeeee!!! - 2012
- Action!(album) - 2014
- What's This??? - 2016
- That's Fantastic! - 2017
- In the Sync - 2019
- In the Sync –renewal edition– - 2025

=== Compilation albums ===
- Hey! Bob! My Friend! - 2000
- Polysics or Die!!!! - 2004
- Polysics or Die!!!! Vista - 2007
- Bestoisu!!!! - 2010

=== Live albums ===
- Live in Japan / 6-D - 2000
- Replay! - 2017

=== Video releases ===
- Live at Newwave - 1999
- B.G.V. - 2000
- DVDVPVDVLIVE!! - 2003
- PippikkippippiP in USA - 2004
- Now Is the live! - 2006
- Clips or Die!!!! - 2007
- We Ate the Show!! - 2008
- Budokan or Die!!!! 2010.3.14 - 2010

=== Singles ===
- "Plus Chicker" - 1999
- "Modern" - 1999
- "XCT" - 2000
- "Each Life Each End" - 2000
- "New Wave Jacket" - 2001
- "Baby Bias" - 2005
- "Coelacanth Is Android" - 2005
- "Electric Surfin' Go Go" - 2006
- "You-You-You" - 2006
- "Catch On Everywhere" - 2007
- "Rocket" - 2007
- "Pretty Good" - 2008
- "Shout Aloud! / Beat Flash" - 2009
- "Young Oh Oh!" - 2009
- "Lucky Star" - 2012
- "Everybody Say No" - 2012
- "Part of Me" - 2019
- "Kami-Saba" - 2019
- "Piko" - 2019

=== EPs ===
- Lo-Bits - 2002
- Kaja Kaja Goo - 2003
- New Wave Jacket / My Sharona - 2004
- I My Me Mine / Jhout - 2006
- eee-P!!! - 2010
- Mega Over Drive - 2013
- HEN 愛 LET'S GO! - 2015
- HEN 愛 LET'S GO! 2 - 2015

=== Soundtracks ===
- Polysics performed the theme song for the Japanese-American Jetix television show Super Robot Monkey Team Hyperforce Go!.
- Polysics' song "You-You-You" is used as one of the opening themes for the anime Keroro Gunso.
- A track from their album Now is the Time!, "Tei! Tei! Tei!", was included in FIFA 07 the soundtrack by EA Sports.
- Anime Network used Polysics' track "Each Life Each End" for the Girl Power programming block.
- The ending theme to the Moyashimon anime is Polysics' "Rocket".
- The opening and ending theme to the Cells at Work! Code Black anime, "Hashire" and "Ue wo Muite Hakobou" respectively.

== Legacy ==
In 2020, Jonathan McNamara of The Japan Times listed For Young Electric Pop (2002) as one of the 10 Japanese albums worthy of inclusion on Rolling Stone's 2020 list of the 500 greatest albums of all time, describing it as "a top-tier Polysics record and an accessible introduction to a band unequaled in their ability to leave you grinning from ear to ear."

Neil Cicierega of Lemon Demon cites Polysics as one of his musical influences. In the text commentary to his 2006 album Dinosaurchestra, he says that the song "Neverending Hum" was inspired by Polysics and Devo. In 2007, he posted a video of him dancing in fast motion to Polysics' "Jhout" to his YouTube channel.
