= Don't Look Away (Kate Voegele album) =

Studio album by Kate Voegele
- Released: May 22, 2007; January 22, 2008 (Re-release); May 13, 2008 (iTunes Exclusive); November 4, 2008 (Deluxe Edition)
- Recorded: 2002–2007
- Genre: Pop, pop rock
- Length: 54:08
- Label: MySpace/Interscope
- Producer: Marshall Altman

Kate Voegele chronology
Don't Look Away (2007)	A Fine Mess (2009)

Singles from Don't Look Away
- 1. "Only Fooling Myself" Released: April 11, 2008; 2. "Hallelujah" Released: September 15, 2008

Professional ratings
Review scores
Source	Rating
Allmusic	4/5 stars

Don't Look Away is the debut full-length album from Kate Voegele, released in May 2007. The album was released via MySpace Records and Interscope Records. It has sold approximately 250,000 copies worldwide to date.

== Background ==
Voegele began work on the album in 2006, after she signed a record contract with Myspace Records and Interscope Records. The album features songs which were used on both of Voegele's extended plays. It was received well by critics and fans, who called Voegele "a breath of fresh air". The album spawned three singles, including Only Fooling Myself, Hallelujah, and You Can't Break a Broken Heart. It has sold approximately 250,000 copies to date worldwide.

== Promotion ==
Voegele promoted the album mainly through live performances. She performed songs from the album on her Lift Me Up Tour, and on Jordin Sparks's Battlefield Tour, in which she appeared as the opening act. Songs from the album were also performed on the hit television series One Tree Hill, by her character Mia Catalano, who is also an aspiring singer.

== Track listings ==
=== Original release ===
All tracks are written by Kate Voegele, unless otherwise noted

No.	Title	Length
1.	"Chicago"	3:57
2.	"I Get It" (Kate Voegele; Peter Zizzo)	3:36
3.	"Only Fooling Myself"	3:34
4.	"Top of the World"	4:02
5.	"One Way or Another"	3:45
6.	"It's Only Life" (Kate Voegele; Jim McGorman)	4:08
7.	"Might Have Been" (Kate Voegele; Marshall Altman)	3:48
8.	"Facing Up" (Kate Voegele; Marshall Altman)	4:11
9.	"No Good"	4:13
10.	"Devil In Me"	4:21
11.	"I Won't Disagree"	3:53
12.	"Wish You Were"	4:47
13.	"Kindly Unspoken"	4:06

Re-Release
No.	Title	Length
14.	"I Get It" (acoustic)	4:02
15.	"Only Fooling Myself" (acoustic)	4:17
16.	"Wish You Were" (acoustic)	4:41

iTunes
No.	Title	Length
14.	"Hallelujah" (Leonard Cohen)	4:54

Deluxe Edition
No.	Title	Length
14.	"You Can't Break a Broken Heart" (Diane Warren)	3:38
15.	"It's Only Life" (acoustic)	4:30
16.	"Facing Up" (acoustic)	4:10
17.	"Devil In Me" (acoustic)	5:20

== Singles ==
"Only Fooling Myself" was released as the album's lead single. The song won first prize in the Pop category of the 2005 USA Songwriting Competition, making her the youngest winner in the history of the competition at that time. She later showcased her song at Borders Books & Music in Austin, TX. It failed to achieve much mainstream success, but managed to chart at 37 on the Billboard Hot Adult Top 40 Tracks.

"Hallelujah", a cover of the classic Leonard Cohen hit, was released as the second single in the United Kingdom. It was featured as a bonus track on the iTunes edition of the album. It is her highest charting single to date in several countries, peaking at number 53 on the UK Singles Chart. It is also her only single to enter the Hot 100 in the US, debuting and peaking at number 68. Due to the strong digital sales, it debuted at number 28 on the US Digital Singles chart, as well as number 43 on the now discontinued Pop 100 chart.

"You Can't Break a Broken Heart" was released as the first single from the deluxe edition of the album. It was meant to become her breakout single, and majorly boost album sales, but it failed to chart on any charts internationally or in the US.

== Chart performance ==
The album debuted at number 68 on the Billboard 200 chart on the week of its release. It quickly rose up the chart and managed to peak at number 27. The album was less successful in Canada, debuting and peaking at number 99 on the album's chart. It also reached number 5 on Billboard's Heatseeker album chart.

=== Charts ===
Chart (2007)	Peak position
Canadian Albums Chart	99
US Billboard 200	27
US Heatseekers	5
US Independent Albums	7
US Rock Albums	6
