= Angel (Kate Voegele song) =

Promotional single by Kate Voegele

from the album A Fine Mess
- Released: April 20, 2009
- Genre: Pop, pop rock
- Length: 3:28
- Label: MySpace Records/Interscope
- Songwriter(s): Kate Voegele

"Angel" is a promo single from singer/songwriter Kate Voegele's second studio album, "A Fine Mess". This single, and the rest of her album, is produced by Mike Elizondo, who has worked with the likes of P!nk and Maroon 5.

== Charts ==
Chart (2009)	Peak position
U.S. Billboard Hot Digital Songs	72
U.S. Billboard Bubbling Under Hot 100	3
Canadian Hot Digital Songs	21
Canadian Hot 100	47
