= QU (album) =

Studio album by Sherwood
- Released: October 13, 2009
- Recorded: 2009
- Genre: Rock
- Label: MySpace
- Producer: Brad Wood

Sherwood chronology
Not Gonna Love EP (2009)	QU (2009)	Some Things Never Leave You (2016)

Singles from QU
- 1. "Not Gonna Love"; 2. "You Are"

Professional ratings
Review scores
Source	Rating
AbsolutePunk	(88%)
Alternative Press	(4/5)
Jesus Freak Hideout	5/5 stars
ReviewRinseRepeat	4/5 stars

QU is the third studio album by the American rock band Sherwood, released digitally and through Myspace Records to music stores on October 13, 2009. The album was released early in electronic format to some of those who pre-ordered due to shipping difficulties. The album was first announced on July 14, 2009. Along with this, the band posted three songs on their MySpace page that appear on the CD. QU was produced, engineered, and mixed by Brad Wood at Seagrass Studios in Valley Village, CA.

== Reception ==
The album was met with positive reviews; AbsolutePunk awarded QU a score of 88%, saying it "is a dynamo. From start to finish, QU is a surefire winner, backed by sterling arrangements, Henry's finest vocal work to date and easily the most confident and polished work of their career. Equal parts cohesive, stimulating and musically stunning, QU is the sound of a band at their apex and fully realizing their potential. If this doesn't turn some heads, the music industry is truly dead inside." Alternative Press reviewer Evan Lucy also praised the album, rating it four out of five, he said QU "shows remarkable growth for a band just now hitting their stride." Timothy Estabrooks of Jesus Freak Hideout commented on the album's summer-feel, and referred to its "consistently top-notch songwriting and catchy melodies", rating it a perfect score of five out of five.

== Track listing ==
No.	Title	Length
1.	"Shelter"	0:53
2.	"Maybe This Time"	3:33
3.	"Hit the Bottom"	2:58
4.	"Make It Through"	2:54
5.	"You Are"	3:11
6.	"Ground Beneath My Feet"	4:14
7.	"Around You"	4:12
8.	"What Are You Waiting For?"	2:56
9.	"Not Gonna Love"	3:52
10.	"Worn"	3:01
11.	"Free"	4:33
12.	"No Better"	5:13

Bonus tracks
No.	Title	Length
13.	"I'm Letting You Go" (iTunes bonus track)	3:28
