= A Silver Lining =

Studio album by We Shot the Moon
- Released: October 6, 2009
- Recorded: 2009
- Genre: Alternative rock
- Label: Afternoon Records
- Producer: Mike Green

We Shot the Moon chronology
Fear And Love (2008)	A Silver Lining (2009)

Singles from A Silver Lining
- 1. "The Bright Side"

A Silver Lining is the second LP by the San Diego rock band We Shot the Moon. It was released to iTunes on October 6, 2009, and was made available in music stores on October 27. It was released through the Minnesota-based indie label Afternoon Records. The first single from the album, "The Bright Side," first appeared for sale in late June 2009, on the website store for Afternoon Records.

== Track listing ==
1. Miracle – 3:27
2. Woke Her Up – 3:07
3. Should Have Been – 2:45
4. The Bright Side – 2:20
5. Come Back – 3:24
6. Red Night – 2:49
7. In Good Time – 3:08
8. A Silver Lining – 3:20
9. Amarillo – 3:55
10. Amy – 3:38
11. Candles – 3:02

== "A Silver Lining Sampler" ==
A Silver Lining Sampler

Studio album (sampler) by We Shot the Moon
- Released: (United States) July, 2009
- Recorded: 2009, 2008 (bonus tracks)
- Genre: Piano Rock, alternative rock
- Length: 8:57 (18:11 including bonus tracks)
- Label: Afternoon Records
- Producer: Mike Green

The band offered to give away samplers of the CD starting in late July and going until September 1.

=== EP track listing ===
1. "The Bright Side" – 2:22
2. "Woke Her Up" – 3:09
3. "Come Back" – 3:26

Bonus Tracks:

1. "Hope" – 4:15 *
2. "Sway Your Head" – 3:19 *
3. "A Simple Prayer" – 1:40 **

An asterisk (*) represents that the selected song also appears on We Shot the Moon's debut LP, Fear And Love.

A double asterisk (**) represents the selected song also appears on Jonathan Jones's solo CD, We Were Young.
