= Absolute Polysics =

Studio album by Polysics
- Released: September 16, 2009 (JP); January 12, 2010 (US)
- Genres: Rock; New wave; Post-punk revival
- Labels: Ki/oon Records (JP); Myspace Records (US)

Polysics chronology
| We Ate the Machine (2008) | Absolute Polysics (2009) | eee-P!!! (2010) |

Professional ratings
Review scores
| Source | Rating |
|---|---|
| Allmusic | 3.5/5 stars |

Absolute Polysics is the ninth full-length studio album from Japanese new wave act Polysics, and the last to feature vocalist and keyboardist Kayo before her departure in 2010. The album was released in September 2009 in Japan and in January 2010 in the U.S.

The album includes the singles "Young OH! OH!" and "Shout Aloud!".

== Track listing ==
All tracks are written by Hiroyuki Hayashi.

| No. | Title | Length |
|---|---|---|
| 1. | "P!" | 1:16 |
| 2. | "Shout Aloud!" | 2:54 |
| 3. | "Young OH! OH!" | 2:41 |
| 4. | "Hypnotize Go" | 2:22 |
| 5. | "Time Out" | 1:14 |
| 6. | "Bero Bero" | 2:26 |
| 7. | "Cleaning" | 3:01 |
| 8. | "E.L.T.C.C.T" | 3:19 |
| 9. | "First Aid" | 2:37 |
| 10. | "Fire Bison" | 3:25 |
| 11. | "Eye Contact" | 2:56 |
| 12. | "Beat Flash" | 2:41 |
| 13. | "Speed Up" | 2:35 |
| 14. | "Wasabi" | 2:21 |
| Total length: | | 35:08 |

== Personnel ==
- Shigekazu Aida – producer
- Hidero Asakawa – photography
- Koichi Endo – executive producer
- Hiroyuki Hayashi – synthesizer, guitar, programming, vocals, vocoder, whistle
- Yuji Katsui – electric violin
- Noriyuki Kikuchi – A&R
- Kotaro Kojima – mastering
- Michihiko Nakayama – executive producer
- Satomi Nanseki – engineer, mixing
- Alex Newport – mixing
- Michifumi Onodera – engineer, mixing
- Polysics – producer
- Kaichiro Shirai – mastering
- Yoshinori "Tsucchie" Tsuchida – drum technician
- Masashi Yano – drums, vocals
