= Sing, but Keep Going =

Sing, But Keep Going

Studio album by Sherwood
- Released: May 31, 2005
- Genre: Rock
- Length: 33:52
- Label: SideCho Records
- Producer: Michael Rosas

Sherwood chronology
| Sherwood (2004) | Sing, But Keep Going (2005) | Summer EP (2006) |

Professional ratings
Review scores
| Source | Rating |
|---|---|
| AbsolutePunk.net | 88% |

Sing, but Keep Going is the first full-length record put out by Sherwood. It was released May 31, 2005. Pre-orders included autographed material by the band members. Dan Koch was the principal songwriter for the album.

== Track listing ==
1. "We Do This to Ourselves" – 2:26
2. "Traveling Alone" – 2:54
3. "The Town That You Live In" – 3:25
4. "Lake Tahoe (For My Father)" – 2:46
5. "Learn to Sing" – 3:15
6. "I'll Wait for You" – 3:09
7. "Something Worth Knowing" – 3:39
8. "Those Bright Lights" – 2:57
9. "What Lucy Found There" – 1:37
10. "Gentleman of Promise" – 2:42
11. "You're Like a Ghost" – 2:50
12. "The Last to Know" – 2:03
