= We Ate the Machine =

Studio album by Polysics
- Released: April 23, 2008 (JP); September 30, 2008 (US)
- Genres: Rock; New wave; Post-punk revival
- Labels: Ki/oon Records (JP); MySpace Records (US)

Polysics chronology
Karate House (2007)	We Ate the Machine (2008)	Absolute Polysics (2009)

Professional ratings
Review scores
Source	Rating
Allmusic	link
Pitchfork Media	6.9/10 link

We Ate the Machine is the eighth full-length studio album from Japanese new wave act Polysics. The album was released in April 2008 in Japan and in September 2008 in the U.S. The U.S. version features re-recorded English language vocals on some of the songs.

The album includes the singles "Pretty Good" and "Rocket".

== Track listing ==
No.	Title	Length
1.	"Moog is Love"	3:32
2.	"Pretty Good"	3:02
3.	"Rocket"	2:55
4.	"機械食べちゃいました (I Ate The Machine)"	2:53
5.	"DNA Junction"	3:21
6.	"Kagayake"	2:56
7.	"ポニーとライオン (Pony and Lion)"	3:08
8.	"ありがとう (Thank You)"	3:19
9.	"イロトカゲ (Colored Lizard)"	4:39
10.	"Mind Your Head"	2:58
11.	"Digital Coffee"	3:20
12.	"Boys & Girls"	3:04
13.	"Blue Noise"	3:17
14.	"Dry or Wet"	3:23
Total length:		45:47
