= We Were Young (album) =

Studio album by Jonathan Jones
- Released: (United States) February 3, 2009
- Recorded: 2008–2009
- Genre: Alternative rock, piano rock

We Were Young is the debut solo album by Jonathan Jones, the singer and songwriter for the bands Waking Ashland and We Shot the Moon. The CD was first released to various websites and iTunes on February 3, 2009. Jones stated that physical copies of the CD will be available "this fall when [he] does a solo tour".

== Track listing ==
1. Simple Prayer*
2. You Don't Need Me
3. The Stills
4. For Better Or Worse
5. Passenger
6. Pass Me By
7. Autumn
8. Like A Kid
9. Advance and Retreat
10. The Well
11. Glass Windows
12. Mister Paranoia
13. My Favorite Color
14. Settle Down
15. Welcome Home

An asterisk (*) represents that the song also appears on the sampler for the We Shot the Moon album, A Silver Lining Sampler.
