= Sweet Silver Lining =

Promotional single by Kate Voegele

from the album A Fine Mess
- Released: May 11, 2009
- Genre: Pop rock
- Length: 3:37
- Label: MySpace/Interscope
- Songwriter(s): Kate Voegele
- Producer(s): Mike Elizondo

"Sweet Silver Lining" is a promo single from American singer-songwriter Kate Voegele's second studio album, A Fine Mess. This single, and the rest of her album, is produced by Mike Elizondo, who has worked with the likes of P!nk and Maroon 5.

== Track listing ==
Digital download

1. "Sweet Silver Lining" – 3:37

== Charts ==
Chart (2009)	Peak position
U.S. Billboard Hot Digital Songs	92
U.S. Billboard Bubbling Under Hot 100	18
Canadian Hot Digital Songs	65
