= Lift Me Up =

Lift Me Up may refer to:

- "Lift Me Up" (Christina Aguilera song)
- "Lift Me Up" (David Guetta song)
- "Lift Me Up" (Five Finger Death Punch song)
- "Lift Me Up" (Geri Halliwell song)
- "Lift Me Up" (Howard Jones song)
- "Lift Me Up" (Kate Voegele song)
- "Lift Me Up" (Lena Katina song)
- "Lift Me Up" (Moby song)
- "Lift Me Up" (OneRepublic song)
- "Lift Me Up" (Rihanna song)
- "Lift Me Up" (Yes song)
- "Lift Me Up", a song by the Afters from Light Up the Sky
- "Lift Me Up", a song by the Benjamin Gate
- "Lift Me Up", a song by Bruce Springsteen from The Essential Bruce Springsteen
- "Lift Me Up", a song by Dirty Heads from Super Moon
- "Lift Me Up", a song by Jay Rock from Follow Me Home
- "Lift Me Up", a song by Jeff Lynne from Armchair Theatre
- "Lift Me Up", a song by Lost Frequencies from Less Is More
- "Lift Me Up", a song by Olivia Newton-John from 2
- "Lift Me Up", a song by Vince Staples from Summertime '06
- "Lift Me Up", a song by Zion I and The Grouch from Heroes in the City of Dope

== See also ==
- "Lift Him Up That's All", a gospel blues song recorded in 1927 by Washington Phillips
