= A Fine Mess (album) =

Studio album by Kate Voegele
- Released: May 18, 2009
- Recorded: 2008–2009
- Genres: Pop, pop rock
- Length: 39:45 (Standard Edition); 59:35 (Deluxe Edition)
- Label: MySpace/Interscope
- Producers: Mark Schwahn (executive), Mike Elizondo

Kate Voegele chronology
Don't Look Away (2007)	A Fine Mess (2009)	Gravity Happens (2011)

Singles from A Fine Mess
- 1. "Manhattan from the Sky" Released: March 17, 2009; 2. "99 Times" Released: April 14, 2009

Professional ratings
Review scores
Source	Rating
AllMusic	3/5 stars
Boston Herald	B+
Entertainment Weekly	B−
The Denver Post	mixed

A Fine Mess is the second studio album by American singer-songwriter Kate Voegele. It is a combination of upbeat pop rock music, adding to the sound of her debut album, Don't Look Away (2007).

== Background ==
Voegele first announced plans for a new album in 2008, while promoting her debut album, Don't Look Away. Between this announcement and the album's release, several songs were previewed and released. Three promotional singles were released from the album, including "Angel", "Lift Me Up", and "Sweet Silver Lining". After the album's release, several songs from the album (including those on the album's deluxe edition) managed to chart on several Billboard Bubbling Under Hot 100 in the US.

== Promotion ==
The album was promoted by the Lift Me Up Tour in which Voegele headlined. She also performed songs from the album while opening up for Jordin Sparks on her Battlefield Tour. Several songs from the album were also premiered by Voegele's character Mia Catalano on One Tree Hill.

== Track listing ==
All tracks are written by Kate Voegele, except where noted.

No.	Title	Writer(s)	Length
1.	"Inside Out"		3:58
2.	"99 Times"	Voegele, Teddy Scott, Elle Stamos	3:28
3.	"Who You Are Without Me"	Voegele, Lindy Robbins, Daniel John Muckala	3:25
4.	"Angel"		4:12
5.	"Sweet Silver Lining"		3:37
6.	"Playing With My Heart"	Voegele, Dave Bassett	3:58
7.	"Manhattan from the Sky"		3:31
8.	"Talkin' Smooth"		4:28
9.	"Lift Me Up"		4:33

Deluxe Edition bonus tracks
No.	Title	Writer(s)	Length
10.	"Say Anything"	Voegele, William James (Bleu) McAuley III	3:50
11.	"Unfair"		4:09
12.	"Forever and Almost Always"		4:39
13.	"Playing With My Heart" (Acoustic)		3:48
14.	"We the Dreamers" (Demo)		3:26

iTunes bonus track
No.	Title	Length
15.	"Inside Out" (Acoustic)	4:35

Amazon bonus track
No.	Title	Length
15.	"Sweet Silver Lining" (Acoustic)	3:14

== Charts ==
Chart (2009)	Peak position
Canadian Albums Chart	8
U.S. Billboard 200	10
