= Nathan Henry =

Nathan Henry may refer to:

- Nathan Henry (TV personality)
- Nathan Henry (musician)
