= Manhattan from the Sky =

Single by Kate Voegele

from the album A Fine Mess
- Released: March 17, 2009
- Genre: Pop rock
- Length: 3:32
- Label: MySpace/Interscope
- Songwriter(s): Kate Voegele

Kate Voegele singles chronology
"You Can't Break a Broken Heart" (2008)	"Manhattan from the Sky" (2009)	"99 Times" (2009)

"Manhattan from the Sky" is one of three singles from singer-songwriter Kate Voegele's second studio album, A Fine Mess. This single and the rest of her album was produced by Mike Elizondo, who has worked with Pink and Maroon 5. The song was also featured on the 18th episode from the sixth season of the series One Tree Hill.

== Track listing ==
Digital download

1. "Manhattan from the Sky" – 3:31

== Charts ==
Chart (2009)	Peak position
U.S. Billboard Hot Digital Songs	95
U.S. Billboard Bubbling Under Hot 100	12
