= Gravity Happens =

Studio album by Kate Voegele
- Released: May 19, 2011
- Recorded: 2010−2011
- Genre: Pop rock, folk rock
- Length: 62 minutes
- Label: ATO, MySpace

Kate Voegele chronology
A Fine Mess (2009)	Gravity Happens (2011)	Wild Card (2014)

Singles from Gravity Happens
- 1. "Heart in Chains" Released: May 17, 2011

Gravity Happens is the third studio album by Kate Voegele, released on May 17, 2011 on MySpace Records and ATO Records in the United States. The album debuted at number 56 on the Billboard 200 albums chart.

== Singles ==
"Heart in Chains", the first single from the album, was released on May 17, 2011. The song premiered during the episode of One Tree Hill aired on that same day. The music video had already been shot, confirmed on Voegele's Twitter. In a still of the video, Voegele blows a kiss with what seems like a forest behind her.

== Track listing ==
All lyrics are written by Kate Voegele; all music is composed by Voegele, except where noted.

No.	Title	Length
1.	"Say You're Mine" (Voegele, Dave Bassett)	3:22
2.	"Hundred Million Dollar Soul"	4:07
3.	"Enough for Always"	3:46
4.	"Sunshine in My Sky" (Voegele, Boots Ottestad)	3:41
5.	"Heart in Chains" (Voegele, Chantal Kreviazuk, Raine Maida)	3:36
6.	"Sandcastles"	4:37
7.	"Burning the Harbor"	4:41
8.	"Impatient Girl"	3:19
9.	"Beg You to Fall"	3:38
10.	"Enjoy the Ride"	3:23
11.	"Gravity Happens" (Voegele, Jeff Trott)	4:21
12.	"Unusual"	3:27
13.	"All I See"	2:22

Deluxe edition bonus tracks
No.	Title	Length
14.	"High Road" (Demo)	3:51
15.	"Counting the Ways" (Demo)	4:19
16.	"Ship in the Dock" (Demo)	5:11
