= Pacific Gold =

American Christian band

- Origin: Seattle, Washington
- Genres: Contemporary Christian music, folk rock, indie rock
- Years active: 2012–present
- Labels: Bad Christian, BC Music
- Members: Torry Anderson; Brian Hibbard; Dan Koch; John Raines; David Stuart
- Website: pacific-gold.com

Pacific Gold is an American Christian music band from Seattle, Washington. Their members include Torry Anderson, Brian Hibbard, Dan Koch, John Raines, and David Stuart. The band independently released its debut EPs, The River and The Holly & the Ivy, in 2012. A third extended play, Pacific Gold, was released in 2013. Their first studio album, Sing My Welcome Home, was released by BC Music in 2015.

== Background ==
Pacific Gold is a Christian music band from Seattle, Washington. Their members are vocalist and keyboardist Torry Anderson, vocalist and lead guitarist Brian Hibbard, lead vocalist and guitarist Dan Koch, bassist John Raines, and drummer David Stuart.

== Music history ==
The band commenced as a musical entity in 2012, with their first release, The River, an extended play, that was released on July 22, 2012, independently. They released, another extended play, independently, The Holly & the Ivy, on November 27, 2012. The subsequent release, yet another extended play, was released independently on November 19, 2013. Their first studio album, Sing My Welcome Home, was released on March 24, 2015, by Bad Christian Music.

== Members ==
Current members

- Torry Anderson – vocals, keys
- Brian Hibbard – vocals, lead guitar
- Dan Koch – lead vocals, guitar
- John Raines – bass
- David Stuart – drums

== Discography ==
Studio albums

- Sing My Welcome Home (March 24, 2015, Bad Christian Music/BC Music)

EPs

- The River (July 22, 2012, Independent)
- The Holly & the Ivy (November 27, 2012, Independent)
- Pacific Gold (November 19, 2013, Independent)
