= Hiroyuki Hayashi =

Hiroyuki Hayashi may refer to:

- Hiroyuki Hayashi (footballer) (林 祐征, born 1983), Japanese footballer
- Hiroyuki Hayashi (athlete) (林 弘幸, born 1973), Japanese sprinter
- Hiroyuki Hayashi (musician) (ハヤシ ヒロユキ, born 1978), Japanese musician
