= AT&T Team USA Soundtrack =

Compilation album by Various artists
- Released: August 7, 2008
- Recorded: 2007–2008
- Genre: Rock, hip hop, rap, R&B, pop, country
- Length: 62:11
- Label: Various labels
- Producer: Various producers

Various artists chronology
AT&T Team USA Soundtrack (2008)	AT&T Team USA Soundtrack 2010 (2010)

Singles from AT&T Team USA Soundtrack
- 1. "Shine" Released: July 29, 2008; 2. "Dreamer" Released: August 7, 2008

AT&T Team USA Soundtrack is a sporting compilation by various artists, released on August 7, 2008. It was created for the 2008 Summer Olympics, in Beijing.

== Background ==
On the album appear singers and bands like Lady Antebellum, 3 Doors Down, Nelly, Queen Latifah, Chris Brown, Sheryl Crow, Kate Voegele, and Taylor Swift. The album consist of 15 English tracks and one Spanish track by Luis Fonsi. The album was released on the USA iTunes Store on August 7, 2008, and can be accessed through its official website.

== Track listing ==
No.	Title	Artist	Length
1.	"The Champion in Me"	3 Doors Down	3:32
2.	"Change"	Taylor Swift	4:43
3.	"Champion"	Queen Latifah	3:34
4.	"So Glad We Made It"	Sheryl Crow	4:08
5.	"Dreamer"	Chris Brown	3:33
6.	"Real"	Goo Goo Dolls	3:25
7.	"I Was Here"	Lady Antebellum	3:41
8.	"Warrior"	Nelly	2:44
9.	"Incredible"	Clique Girlz	4:37
10.	"Somethin' Special (Beijing Olympic Mix)"	Colbie Caillat	3:06
11.	"Lift Me Up"	Kate Voegele	4:28
12.	"To Remember"	Josh Kelley	4:23
13.	"Perfect"	Army of Me	4:39
14.	"Shine"	Boys Like Girls	3:34
15.	"Champion"	Flipsyde	4:12
16.	"No Me Doy Por Vencido"	Luis Fonsi	3:52

== AT&T Team USA Soundtrack 2010 ==
AT&T Team USA Soundtrack 2010 is a compilation album of various artists, put together for the 2010 Winter Olympics in British Columbia, Canada. It features 12 tracks from artists such as Rascal Flatts, 3 Doors Down, Sugarland and Train, among others. It was released on iTunes.

All proceeds from sales of the album made through March 1, 2010 benefited Team USA.

Rascal Flatts re-recorded its single "Unstoppable" with slightly altered lyrics for their contribution to the album. The new lyrics celebrate the spirit of competition of the games.

=== Track listing ===
1. "Shine" performed by 3 Doors Down
2. "Move Along" performed by The All-American Rejects
3. "In the Zone" performed by David Banner and BJ the Chicago Kid
4. "The World Is Ours Tonight" performed by Gloriana
5. "Rise Up" performed by Green River Ordinance
6. "Can't Box Me In" performed by Honor Society
7. "Never Be Here Again" performed by Hoobastank
8. "100%" performed by Mariah Carey
9. "Shook Up the World" performed by Puddle of Mudd
10. "Unstoppable (Olympics Mix)" performed by Rascal Flatts
11. "Wide Open" performed by Sugarland
12. "The Finish Line" performed by Train
13. "Forever Young" performed by The Pretenders
