= Crane Technique =

CRANE TECHNIQUE
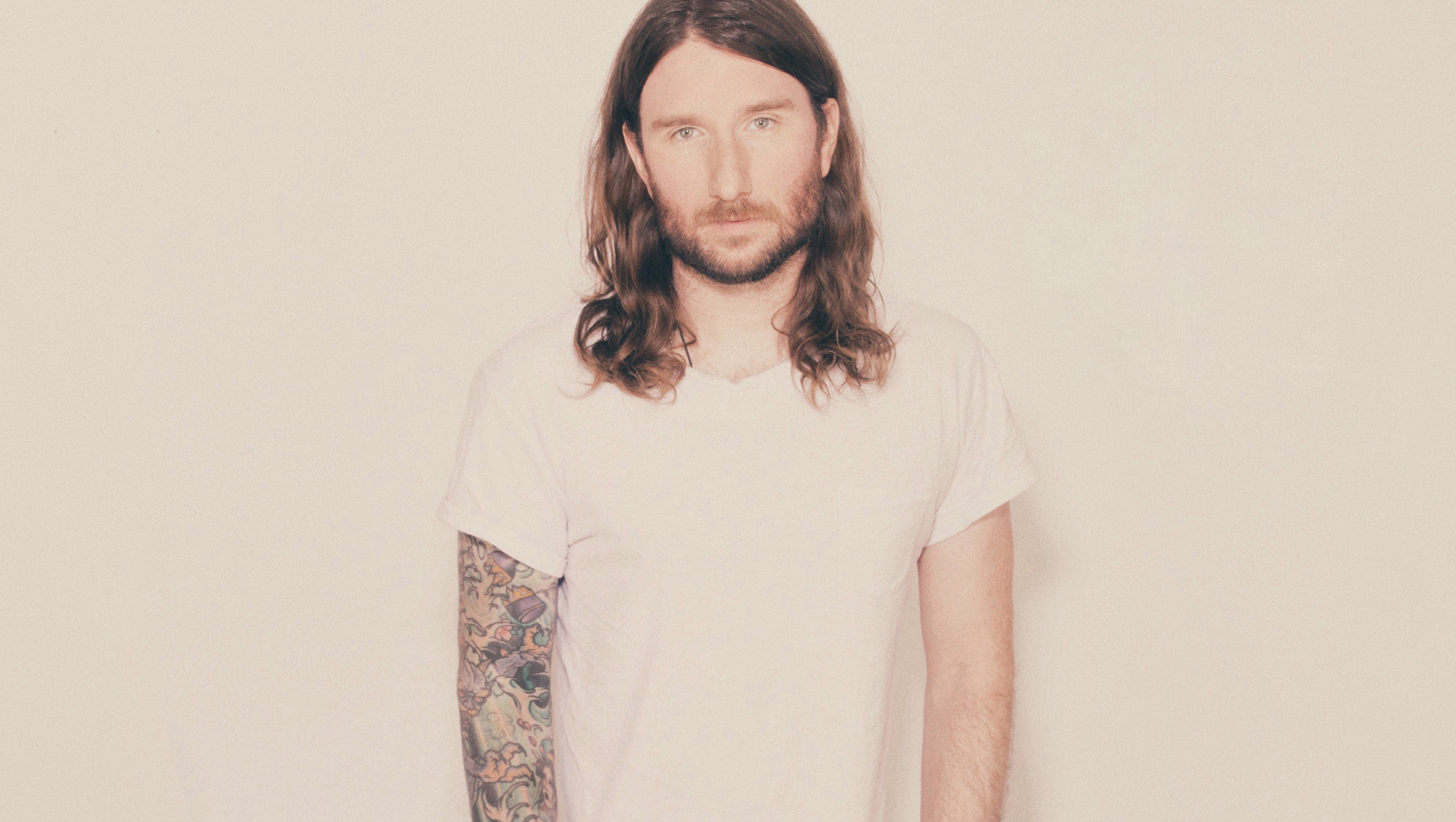
- Paul Wheatley (2017)

Background information
- Birth name: Paul John Wheatley
- Also known as: Crane Technique
- Born: 29 January 1979 (age 46); Dublin, Ireland
- Origin: Minneapolis, Minnesota, US
- Genres: Alternative rock; electronic; nu-disco; R&B; synth-pop
- Occupations: Singer-songwriter; musician; multi-instrumentalist
- Instruments: Vocals; guitar; drums; bass guitar; piano
- Years active: 2010–present
- Labels: BMI
- Member of: We Shot The Moon

Paul John Wheatley (born January 29, 1979) better known by his artist name CRANE TECHNIQUE, is an Irish-American musician and songwriter based in Minneapolis, MN. Wheatley first gained prominence as lead guitarist and back-up vocalist for the San Diego-based piano rock band We Shot The Moon (The Militia Group). Crane Technique was founded as Wheatley's solo music project in 2010, after releasing his first single, "Darling, Say Goodbye" (Broadcast Music, Inc.). After much U.S. and international touring, he released numerous singles and a 5-song EP called Ghost White in 2014 (Broadcast Music, Inc., Sonic Parcel Records). His tracks "Love U 4 It" & "Naked" feat. Modern Longing were released in 2017. In 2018, he released another single called "Just 4 2Nite".

== Discography ==
=== EPs ===
- Ghost White EP (2014)

=== Singles ===
- "Darling, Say Goodbye" (2010)
- "Love On" (2012)
- "I'll Rise" (2013)
- "Ghost White" (2014)
- "Love U 4 It" (2017) (with Modern Longing)
- "Naked" (2017) (with Modern Longing)
- "Just 4 2Nite" (2018)
- "Still In Love With You" (2020)
- “Fangs Out” (2022)

=== Remixes ===
- "Replacements" Feat. La Roux (2024) (with Chromeo)
