= Lift Me Up (Kate Voegele song) =

Promotional single by Kate Voegele

from the album A Fine Mess
- Released: August 7, 2008; May 4, 2009 (new edit)
- Genre: Pop rock
- Length: 4:28; 4:33 (new edit)
- Label: Myspace Records/Interscope
- Songwriter(s): Kate Voegele

"Lift Me Up" is a promo single from singer-songwriter Kate Voegele's second studio album, A Fine Mess. This single, and the rest of her album, was produced by Mike Elizondo, who has worked with the likes of Pink and Maroon 5. The song was included in 2008 on the 2008 Beijing Olympic Games soundtrack, sponsored by AT&T.

== Track listing ==
Digital download

1. "Lift Me Up" – 4:33

== Charts ==
AT&T version

Chart (2009)	Peak position
U.S. Billboard Hot Digital Songs	84
U.S. Billboard Bubbling Under Hot 100	16

New edit version

Chart (2009)	Peak position
U.S. Billboard Hot Digital Songs	87
U.S. Billboard Bubbling Under Hot 100	10
Canadian Hot Digital Songs	10
Canadian Hot 100	29
