= Sherwood (EP) =

EP by Sherwood
- Released: 2004
- Genre: Indie rock
- Length: 23:44
- Label: independent
- Producer: Michael Rosas

Sherwood chronology
Sherwood (2004)	Sing, But Keep Going (2005)

Professional ratings
Review scores
Source	Rating
AbsolutePunk.net	71%

Sherwood is the eponymous debut EP by the band Sherwood, released in 2004.

== Track listing ==
1. The Summer Sends Its Love – 3:40
2. Please Wait Up For Me – 3:25
3. The Push Game – 3:20
4. Pray Forgive Me These Mistakes – 1:55
5. Under a Lamp – 3:51
6. (Anything) You Choose – 3:42
7. I'll See That You Aren't Woken Up – 3:46
8. My Dear Friend (iTunes bonus track) – 1:55
