= Hey! Bob! My Friend! =

Studio album by Polysics
- Released: May 29, 2001
- Genre: Synthpop
- Label: Asian Man Records
- Producer: Polysics

Polysics chronology
Hey! Bob! My Friend! (2001)	Neu (2003)

Professional ratings
Review scores
Source	Rating
Allmusic	4/5 stars
Pitchfork Media	(9.0/10)

Hey! Bob! My Friend! is the debut US release for the Japanese synth-rock band Polysics.

The album consists of various tracks from the band's earlier Japanese-only releases 1st P and A.D.S.R.M!.

== Track listing ==
1. "Sunnymaster"
2. "Buggie Technica"
3. "Plus Chicker (981018 mix)"
4. "Hot Stuff"
5. "Married to a Frenchman"
6. "Eleki Gassen"
7. "Nice"
8. "Good"
9. "Monsoon"
10. "Pike"
11. "Poly-Farm"
12. "Modern"
