= Kate Voegele =

American singer-songwriter and actress (born 1986)

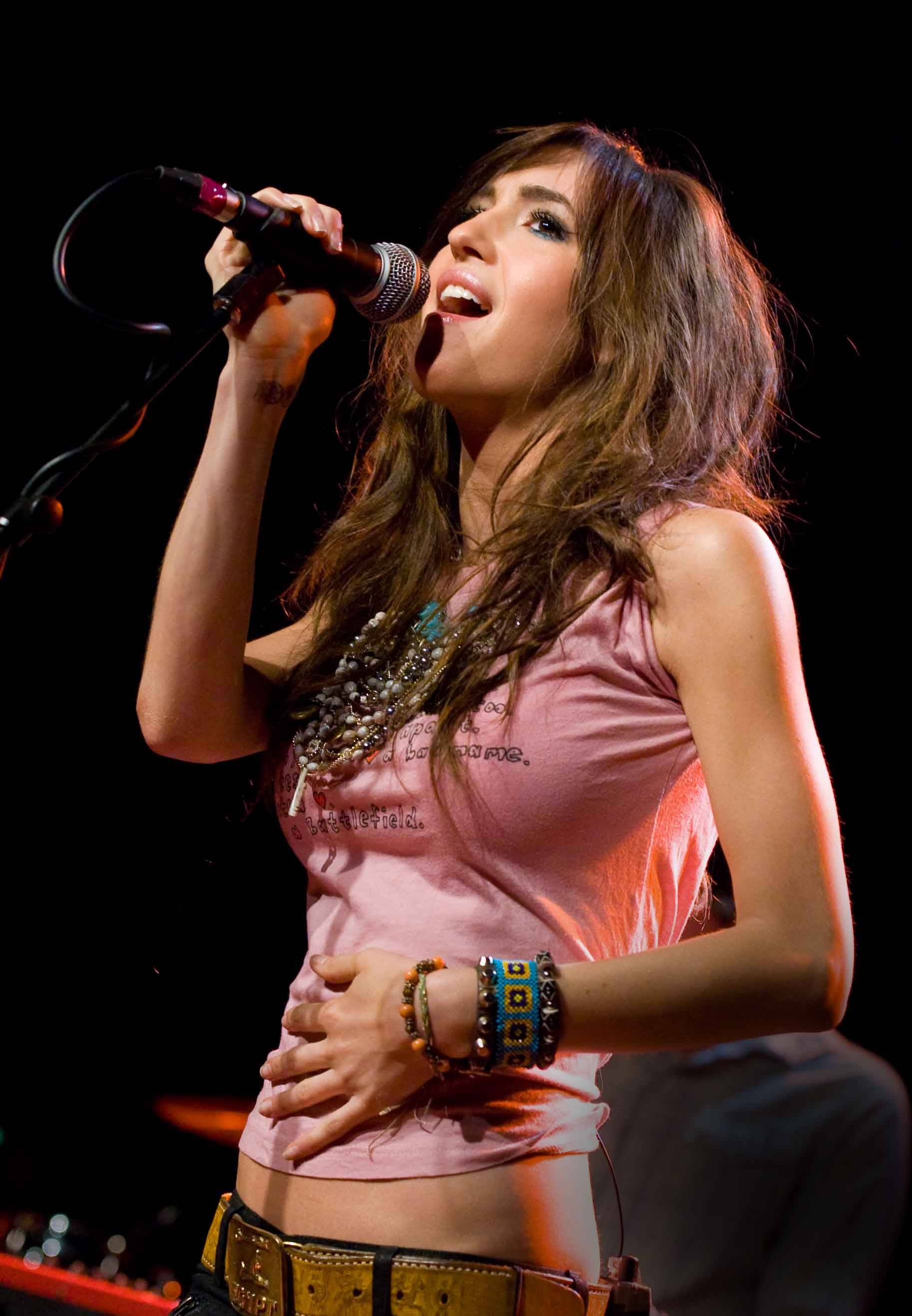
- Voegele in 2011

Background information
- Born: Kate Elizabeth Voegele; December 8, 1986 (age 39); Bay Village, Ohio, United States
- Genres: Pop; pop rock; folk-pop
- Occupations: Musician, songwriter, actress
- Instruments: Vocals, guitar, mandolin, piano
- Years active: 2002–present
- Label: Interscope
- Website: www.katevoegele.com

Kate Elizabeth Voegele (/ˈvoʊɡəl/ VOH-gəl; born December 8, 1986) is an American singer-songwriter and actress. She made her musical debut in 2003, with the release of her extended play The Other Side. She performed numerous local live shows to promote the album, and toured with artists such as John Mayer. In 2005, she released her second extended play, Louder Than Words. Both had local success, and helped raise awareness of Voegele as an artist. During this time period, Voegele performed at events such as Farm Aid to promote her music, and began posting her music on popular social media network MySpace. She also won numerous awards and honors for her songwriting abilities.

Voegele officially signed with Interscope Records in 2006, and immediately began working on her official debut album. Her first studio album, Don't Look Away, was released in 2007 to generally positive reviews. The album became her first to chart on the Billboard 200, and was re-released numerous times since its release. It spawned two singles, one of which charted on the Billboard Hot 100 and the UK Singles Chart. While promoting this album, Voegele began appearing as Mia Catalano in the television series One Tree Hill. This made her acting debut, and helped promote her music. She would remain a recurring cast member for four seasons, lasting until 2011.

Voegele released her second studio album, A Fine Mess, in 2009. The album debuted at number 10 on the Billboard 200. It spawned one single, "99 Times", which became her most successful radio single in the US to date. Numerous promotional singles were released to promote the album, some of which had commercial success. In 2011, Voegele released her third studio album, Gravity Happens. This was her first album to be released through ATO Records. The album debuted and peaked at number 53 on the Billboard 200. Her fourth studio album, Canyonlands, was released in 2016. On the 16th September 2026, Vogele announced via her social media accounts that her fifth studio album, Age of Alchemy will be released on November 13th, 2026, ten years after her previous solo studio album release.

== Early life ==
Kate Elizabeth Voegele was born in the Cleveland suburb of Bay Village, Ohio on December 8, 1986. She is of German, English, French, Irish, Scottish, and Italian descent. Voegele was taught to play guitar at age 15. In 2005, Voegele graduated from Bay High School where she was on the dance squad. She attended college at Miami University where she was a member of Kappa Alpha Theta sorority.

== Career ==
=== 2002–2006: Musical beginnings and early success ===
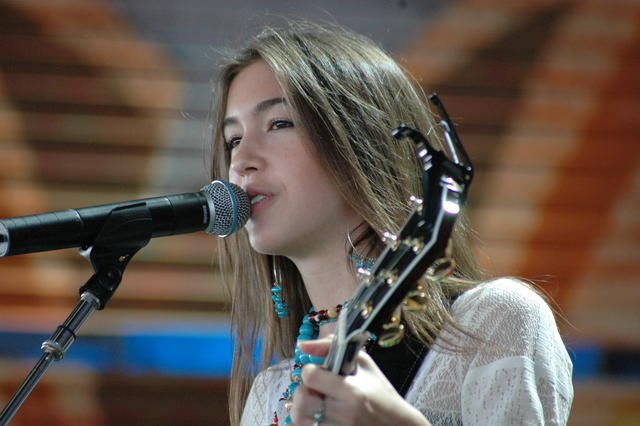
Voegele performing at Farm Aid in Chicago, Illinois, on September 18, 2005

Voegele made her musical debut in 2002, while Voegele was only 16 years old, when she recorded and released her debut extended play, The Other Side. The song "Top of the World" received local radio airplay, and songs from the album were performed locally by Voegele at numerous venues. That same year, Voegele performed alongside John Mayer and Counting Crows. In 2004, it was revealed that Voegele would be a performer at the 2004 Farm Aid concert, alongside artists such as Willie Nelson and Neil Young. Voegele's songs began being used in popular media as well around this time. Her song "Only Fooling Myself" was featured in series' such as Clubhouse and The Ghost Whisperer. Her song "It's Only Life" was featured in the MTV series Newport Harbor: The Real Orange County.

In 2004, Voegele released her second extended play, Louder Than Words. The extended play, as well as her previous one, helped further draw interest in Voegele as an artist. The album featured songs from her first album, as well as a new song titled "Better Days". That same year, Voegele's song "Only Fooling Myself" won the Pop category of the 2005 USA Songwriting Contest, the youngest artist ever to win the honor in any category. In 2006, her song "I Won't Disagree" was a winner of the New York City Songwriters Circle. Her song "Only Fooling Myself" also won praise at the 2006 USA Songwriting Competition at Borders Books & Music in Austin, Texas.

In 2006, Voegele received a message on popular social media website MySpace from the owner, Tom Anderson. Anderson asked if Voegele was signed, and later asked her to meet him. She later signed with MySpace Records, a branch of Interscope Records. On the event, Voegele stated "I thought it was a fake message. I mean does Tom really even exist, let alone go on MySpace and send messages to random people? But sure enough, it was totally legitimate, and the next week I was out in LA meeting and showcasing for him. [...] I was so excited because from the start I knew MySpace Records was different than other labels I'd been to. I felt immediately comfortable and I could tell I would be given a lot of artistic freedom there."

=== 2007–2008: Don't Look Away and One Tree Hill ===
Voegele performing on the "Back 2 School Tour"

Voegele began working on her debut album in Fall of 2006, shortly after signing with the label. She released her official debut studio album, Don't Look Away, on May 22, 2007. Don't Look Away debuted at number 63 on the Billboard 200, selling 10,000 copies in its first week of release. It went on to sell over 250,000 copies. Her appearance on the series was noted as being a big advancement for Voegele career wise, with Voegele performing numerous songs from her album on the show. The first episode of One Tree Hill featuring Voegele premiered on January 22, 2008.

The same day that Voegele made her appearance on One Tree Hill, her debut album was re-released featuring a new cover art and three new acoustic songs. In April 2008, Voegele released her official debut single, "Only Fooling Myself". The song's music video was released in May 2008, and featured Voegele singing as the background changes to various different locations. The single peaked a #37 on the Hot Adult Top 40 Tracks chart in the US, which is based on radio airplay. In September of the same year, Voegele released her second official single, a cover of the Leonard Cohen song "Hallelujah". Voegele's version of the song became her first single to chart on the Billboard Hot 100 chart in the US, where it debuted and peaked at number 68 on the chart. This made it the first time any version of the song had charted on the Hot 100, and remained the only time the song had made the chart until Justin Timberlake and Matt Morris released their version in 2010. The success of the singles also helped boost sales of Don't Look Away. The album eventually climbed the Billboard 200 to achieve a peak of 27, making it her second highest-charting album to date. Don't Look Away has sold an estimated 237,000 copies as of 2009.

The success of Voegele's debut album later led to her appearing on numerous compilation albums that year as well. She recorded a cover of the song "When You Wish Upon a Star" for the compilation album DisneyMania 6. Her song "It's Only Life" was featured on the soundtrack for the ABC Family series Kyle XY. Her song "Lift Me Up" was later featured on the AT&T Team USA Soundtrack. Voegele's songs "Devil in Me" and "You Can't Break a Broken Heart" are featured on the Music from One Tree Hill soundtrack, released in 2008.

=== 2009–2011: A Fine Mess and Gravity Happens ===
It was revealed in 2008 that Voegele would be returning for the sixth season of One Tree Hill that same year. While touring to promote her previous album, she began writing material for her second studio album. While working on her second studio album, Voegele's One Tree Hill character was also working on her album. Voegele's second studio album, A Fine Mess, was released on May 18, 2009. The album debuted at number 10 on the Billboard 200, with first week sales of 37,000 copies. This made it the highest first week sales for one of Voegele's albums, and her highest-peaking album to date. By September of that same year, the album had sold an estimated 157,000 copies worldwide. One official single, "99 Times", was released from the album on April 14, 2009. The single went on to become her most successful single in terms of radio airplay, peaking at number 22 on the Hot Adult Top 40 Tracks chart in the US. This made it her second and highest entry on the chart. It also peaked at number 8 on the Bubbling Under Hot 100 Singles chart. Voegele returned for the seventh season of One Tree Hill in 2009, making it the third season to feature Voegele's character. Voegele later returned for the eighth season of the series as well, and recorded a version of the show's theme song. She continued to play music on the series throughout her appearance. Voegele did not return for the ninth and final season.

=== 2012–present: Wild Card EP and Canyonlands ===
Voegele has confirmed that she is working on her fourth studio album, which she hoped to release in 2013; while she released an EP, Wild Card, in 2014, the full album Canyonlands was released on October 28, 2016.

She released a new single on December 8, 2017—on her thirty-first birthday—titled "Shoot This Arrow". The song addresses sexual harassment as well as the sexual harassment allegedly committed by Mark Schwahn, the creator of popular teen drama television series One Tree Hill.

In 2019, she collaborated with Tyler Hilton on the song "When the Night Moves", which appeared on his album City on Fire.

== Discography ==
=== Studio albums ===
List of albums, with selected chart positions, sales and certifications
Title	Album details	Peak chart positions					Sales
Title	Album details	US	US Indie	US Heat	US Rock	CAN	Sales
Don't Look Away	Released: May 22, 2007; Label: MySpace, Interscope; Formats: CD, digital download	27	7	5	6	99	WW: 237,000
A Fine Mess	Released: May 18, 2009; Label: MySpace, Interscope; Formats: CD, digital download	10	—	4	—	8	
Gravity Happens	Released: May 17, 2011; Label: ATO; Formats: CD, digital download	53	8	—	—	33	WW: 60,000
Canyonlands	Released: October 28, 2016; Label: Communikate; Formats: CD, digital download	—	—	—	—	—	
Age of Alchemy	Released: November 13, 2026; Label: Communikate; Formats: vinyl, TBC						
"—" denotes album that did not chart or was not released

=== EPs ===
List of extended plays
Title	Details
The Other Side	Released: 2002; Label: Independent; Format: CD
Louder Than Words	Released: 2004; Label: Independent; Released: December 21, 2009; Label: MySpace, Interscope; Format: Digital download
Wild Card	Released: November 4, 2014; Label: Communikate; Format: Digital download

=== Singles ===
List of singles, with selected chart positions, showing year released and album name
Title	Year	Peak chart positions				Album
Title	Year	US	US Pop	CAN	UK	Album
"Only Fooling Myself"	2008	—	—	—	—	Don't Look Away
"Hallelujah"	2008	68	43	—	53	Don't Look Away
"Manhattan from the Sky"	2009	— (Note: "Manhattan from the Sky" did not enter the Billboard Hot 100, but peaked at number 12 on the Bubbling Under Hot 100 chart.)	—	—	—	A Fine Mess
"99 Times"	2009	— (Note: "99 Times" did not enter the Billboard Hot 100, but peaked at number 8 on the Bubbling Under Hot 100 chart.)	—	58	—	A Fine Mess
"Heart in Chains"	2011	—	—	—	—	Gravity Happens
"Shoot This Arrow"	2017	—	—	—	—	—
"French"	2019	—	—	—	—	—
"Anxious"	2020	—	—	—	—	—
"This Is Home"	2020	—	—	—	—	—
"The Best Part (French Version)"	2023	—	—	—	—	—
"We've Got Places"	2023	—	—	—	—	Impatient For The Dream
"PRITTY"	2024	—	—	—	-	Impatient For The Dream
"—" denotes single that did not chart or was not released

==== Promotional singles ====
List of promotional singles, with selected chart positions, showing year released and album name
Title	Year	Peak chart positions		Album
Title	Year	US Bub.	CAN	Album
"Lift Me Up"	2008	10	29	A Fine Mess
"Angel"	2009	3	47	A Fine Mess
"Sweet Silver Lining"	2009	14	87	A Fine Mess

=== Other charted songs ===
List of other charted songs, with selected chart positions, showing year released and album name
Title	Year	Peak chart positions	Album
Title	Year	US	Album
"Kindly Unspoken"	2008	98	Don't Look Away
"No Good"	2008	— (Note: "No Good" did not enter the Billboard Hot 100, but peaked at number 22 on the Bubbling Under Hot 100 chart.)	Don't Look Away
"Wish You Were"	2008	— (Note: "Wish You Were" did not enter the Billboard Hot 100, but peaked at number 13 on the Bubbling Under Hot 100 chart.)	Don't Look Away
"Forever and Almost Always"	2009	— (Note: "Forever and Almost Always" did not enter the Billboard Hot 100, but peaked at number 18 on the Bubbling Under Hot 100 chart.)	A Fine Mess

== Filmography ==
=== As an actress ===
Year	Title	Role	Notes
2008–11	One Tree Hill	Mia Catalano	Recurring (Seasons 5–8); 38 episodes
2010	Life Unexpected	Mia Catalano	Episode: "Music Faced"

=== As herself ===
Year	Title	Role	Notes
2009	The Wendy Williams Show	Guest	Episode: "Episode dated 10 September 2009"
2009	The Tonight Show with Conan O'Brien	Musical guest	Performed "99 Times"
2009	The Bachelor	Musical guest	Performed "I Won't Disagree"
2012	One Tree Hill: Always and Forever	Herself	TV movie
2014	Sessions at the Willow Grove	Herself	Series of musical concerts
2016	Songs of Summer	Herself	Episode: "Kate Voegele: Must Be Summertime"
