= Now Is the Time! =

Now is the Time!

Studio album by Polysics
- Released: 21 October 2005
- Genre: Rock
- Length: 44:08
- Label: Ki/oon Records (Japan); Tofu Records (US); Tired & Lonesome Records (UK)
- Producer: Andy Gill / Polysics

Polysics chronology
Polysics or Die!!!! (2004)	Now is the Time! (2005)	Karate House (2007)

Professional ratings
Review scores
Source	Rating
Pitchfork Media	7.0/10 link
Popmatters	8/10 link
Spin	?/10 link

Now is the Time is the sixth album by Japanese band Polysics. It is the first album of new material to be released in Japan, the United States of America, and the United Kingdom. Several tracks on the album were produced by Andy Gill of the band Gang of Four. The Japanese, US, and UK releases all have different track lists, each with exclusive tracks.

The songs "Coelakanth Is Android", "Baby BIAS" and "I My Me Mine" were released as singles in Japan.

== Track listing ==
Japanese release (Released 10 October 2005 on Ki/oon Records)

1. Tei! Tei! Tei!
2. シーラカンス イズ アンドロイド (Coelakanth Is Android)
3. I My Me Mine
4. Ah-Yeah!!
5. Walky Talky
6. Wild One
7. Rack Rack [Japan Exclusive]
8. Toisu!
9. Boy's Head
10. Oh! Monaliza!
11. Jhout
12. The Next World [Japan Exclusive]
13. Skip It
14. Baby BIAS
15. Bye-Bye-Bye

American release (Released 21 February 2006 on Tofu Records)

1. Tei! Tei! Tei!
2. Coelakanth Is Android
3. I My Me Mine
4. Ah-Yeah!!
5. Walky Talky
6. Wild One
7. Super Sonic [US Exclusive]
8. Toisu!
9. Boy's Head
10. Oh! Monaliza!
11. Jhout
12. Mr. Psycho Psycho [US & UK Exclusive]
13. Skip It
14. Baby BIAS
15. Bye-Bye-Bye

UK release (Released 24 April 2006 on Tired & Lonesome Records)

1. Coelakanth Is Android
2. I Me My Mine
3. Ah Yeah!
4. Walky Talky
5. Wild One
6. Toisu!
7. Metal Coconuts [UK Exclusive]
8. Boy's Head
9. Oh Monaliza!
10. Baby BIAS
11. Jhout
12. Rain Rain Rain [UK Exclusive]
13. Skip It!
14. Psycho Psycho San [US & UK Exclusive]
15. Life In Yellow [UK Exclusive]
