= Community Group (album) =

Studio album by Jonathan Jones
- Released: June 14, 2011
- Genres: Pop Rock, Piano Rock
- Label: Self-Released

Professional ratings
Review scores
Source	Rating
Christian Music Zine	4.5/5 stars
The Tune	(3.4/5)

Community Group is the second solo album by the American musician Jonathan Jones, self-released in 2011.

== Track listing ==
No.	Title	Length
1.	"Last Place"	1:37
2.	"The Living Dead"	4:22
3.	"Duracell"	2:50
4.	"East Coast Feelings"	4:20
5.	"Community Group"	3:00
6.	"Vacancy"	3:24
7.	"Hey Andy"	3:42
8.	"Brand New Eyes"	3:48
9.	"My Faith"	3:27
10.	"Morning Light"	2:51
