= 100% (Mariah Carey song) =

Promotional single by Mariah Carey

from the album AT&T Team USA Soundtrack
- Released: February 9, 2010
- Recorded: 2009
- Genre: R&B
- Length: 4:12
- Label: Island
- Songwriters: Mariah Carey; Crystal Johnson; Jermaine Dupri; Bryan-Michael Cox
- Producers: Jermaine Dupri; Bryan-Michael Cox

"100%" is a song by American singer Mariah Carey originally recorded as a soundtrack promotional single from the motion picture Precious but then reassigned to the AT&T Team USA Soundtrack for the 2010 Winter Olympics. The song was also due to feature on Carey's now cancelled thirteenth studio/second remix album, Angels Advocate though it was never tipped as a single from the latter.

The piano-driven contemporary R&B ballad is themed around reaching your potential with lyrics like "don't stop till you make the finish". Written by Carey, Crystal Johnson, Bryan-Michael Cox, Jermaine Dupri and produced by the latter two. Carey does not share production credits following "Say Somethin'". The song was released as a special promotional single to raise money for Team USA at the 2010 Winter Olympics. It was released exclusively to the American and Canadian iTunes Stores and AT&T wireless devices on February 9, 2010.

== Background and composition ==
In 2009, Carey appeared as a social worker in Precious, the movie adaptation of the 1996 novel Push by Sapphire. The film garnered mostly positive reviews from critics, as has Carey's performance. Variety described her acting as "pitch-perfect". Precious won awards at both the Sundance Film Festival and the Toronto Film Festival, receiving top honors there. In January 2010, Carey won the Breakthrough Actress Performance Award for her role in Precious at the Palm Springs International Film Festival. For the film's soundtrack, Carey recorded a track titled "100%", which was later released as a promotional single from the AT&T U.S. Winter Olympics soundtrack on February 9, 2010, to raise money for the U.S. Olympics Team. The R&B ballad contains elements of gospel music, and was written by Carey, while Crystal Johnson, Jermaine Dupri, and Bryan-Michael Cox produced and wrote additional lyrics to the track. The singer's vocal range spans from the note of E_{3} to F#_{6}. The track is composed in the key of A major in common time and a tempo of 60 beats per minute, with the long chord progression of the song being A, A/F♯, A/D, E/G♯, A/F♯, A/E, A/D, C♯, A/F♯ and A/E.

== Release and use ==
"100%" was replaced by the song "I Can See in Color" by Mary J. Blige for the "Precious (soundtrack)." When Carey was performing at a date on the Canadian leg of her Angels Advocate Tour at the Air Canada Centre she announced the song would be used for the Winter Olympic games. Carey spoke of the opportunity for the song to be part of the Olympics.

"I am honored to be a part of this effort to support Team USA through this soundtrack. The Olympic Winter Games create once-in-a-lifetime moments for the entire world to see. It is truly amazing to watch these first-rate athletes compete and give everything they have to reach new levels of achievement. Their actions provide hope and inspiration for everyone. As artists, we strive to encourage others through our music."

All proceeds from the purchase of songs from the soundtrack, participating ringtones and answer tones from February 12, 2010, through March 1, 2010 were donated to Team USA. It charted on the Hot Digital Songs chart at number 197.

== Accolades ==
List of accolades and award nominations for "100%"
Publication	List	Rank	Ref.
Billboard	10 Best Olympic Winter Games Anthems	9	

== Music video ==
On February 9, 2010, Carey filmed the music video for "100%" during the Toronto show of her Angels Advocate Tour. The video was directed by Shawn Robbins and uses 2 takes of the song, one take filmed during a sound check and one take from the live show. She asked the audience if they could stay and help her film the video. The music video is reportedly inspired by the video of her song "Hero". The music video premiered Saturday February 20, 2010 on NBC's Olympics. The video features Carey singing the song on tour with a backdrop of the Olympic rings whilst cutting back to clips of team U.S.A.

== Release history ==
Release history for "100%"
Country	Date	Format	Label	Ref.
United States	February 9, 2010	Digital download	Island Records	
Canada	February 9, 2010	Digital download	Universal Music	
