= Summer EP (Sherwood EP) =

EP by Sherwood
- Released: September 12, 2006
- Genre: Rock
- Length: 20:08
- Label: Independent / pressed by Relevance Records
- Producer: Sherwood

Sherwood chronology
Sing, But Keep Going (2005)	Summer EP (2006)	A Different Light (2007)

Summer EP is a 2006 release by the indie rock band Sherwood. During the spring of 2006, AbsolutePunk.net offered a 5-song version of this album to download for free. Later that year, a physical version with two extra tracks was released for sale at the band's live performances and online.

== Track listing ==
1. The Only Song – 3:18
2. Middle Of The Night – 3:14
3. This Airplane Is A Ribbon – 3:06
4. I'm Asking Her To Stay – 2:29
5. The Simple Life – 3:08
6. A Different Light – 2:53
7. My Dear Friend – 1:54
