= Sing My Welcome Home =

Studio album by Pacific Gold
- Released: March 24, 2015
- Genre: CCM, folk rock, indie rock
- Length: 39:08
- Label: Bad Christian

Sing My Welcome Home is the first studio album by Pacific Gold. Bad Christian Music released the album on March 24, 2015.

== Critical reception ==
Professional ratings
Review scores
Source	Rating
Christian Review Magazine	4/5 stars
CM Addict	3/5 stars
HM Magazine	4/5 stars
Indie Vision Music	4/5 stars
Jesus Freak Hideout	4/5 stars 3.5/5 stars

Sarah Brehm, indicating in a four star review at HM wrote, "It's an album filled with indie rock music that would be just as comfortable in the church as it would in a coffee house." Awarding the album four stars from Jesus Freak Hideout, Scott Fryberger states, "With Sing My Welcome Home, they've established themselves as one of the best worship bands of today." Timothy Estabrooks, giving the album three and a half stars for Jesus Freak Hideout, writes, "overall, Sing My Welcome Home is an effective and creative re-introduction to some classic hymns that definitely deserves a few spins." Rating the album four stars at Indie Vision Music, Scott Swan says, "Pacific Gold manages to not only re-energize lyrics from old, but also fosters a style that reawakens musical genres from bygone eras." Christian St. John, awarding the album four stars by Christian Review Magazine, describes, "Sing My Welcome Home is a pretty unique listening experience". Giving the album three stars for CM Addict, Jon Ownbey opines, "Sing My Welcome Home is a great album for those who enjoy the sounds of indie rock with lyrics that are spiritually focused."

== Track listing ==
Track listing
No.	Title	Length
1.	"A Day Is Coming"	2:56
2.	"Gone to the Grave"	3:59
3.	"I Will Know Him"	3:27
4.	"Song in the Air"	4:11
5.	"Spirit of God"	2:53
6.	"Dear Refuge of My Weary Soul"	3:51
7.	"The Sands of Time"	4:52
8.	"Once I Had a Glorious View"	4:20
9.	"Shed a Beam of Heavenly Day"	3:40
10.	"Sweet Rivers of Redeeming Love"	3:18
11.	"The Sands of Time (Reprise)"	1:44
Total length:		39:08
