= Sherwood (band) =

American rock band

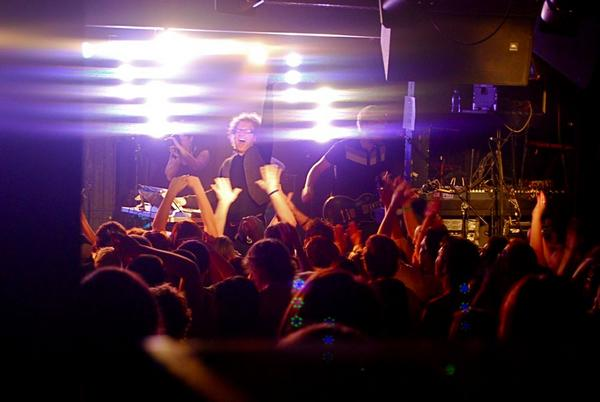
- Sherwood performing at El Corazon in Seattle, WA in March 2008

Background information
- Origin: San Luis Obispo, California, United States
- Genres: Indie rock, pop punk, pop rock
- Years active: 2002–2012, 2015-present
- Labels: Myspace Records (2006–2012); Sidecho Records
- Members: Nate Henry; Dan Koch; Joe Greenetz; Mike Leibovich; David Provenzano
- Past members: Chris Armstrong; Chris Keene; Billy Dunaway; Gabe Dutton
- Website: www.sherwoodmusic.net

Sherwood is an indie rock band from San Luis Obispo, California, specializing in upbeat pop rock. Members of the band cite The Beatles and The Beach Boys as some of their main influences. The band broke up in 2012 after ten years together. On September 28, 2015, the band announced via their Facebook page that they would be starting an Indiegogo account in order to crowdfund their fourth album, Some Things Never Leave You, which was released on June 17, 2016.

== History ==
The band began in late 2002 while several of its founding members were attending Cal Poly in San Luis Obispo, California. The band first formed with Nate Henry on vocals and bass, Dan Koch on drums, and Chris Armstrong on guitar. The name Sherwood comes from an inside band joke about creating a concept album that synced with the 1973 Disney Robin Hood cartoon in the same way that Pink Floyd's The Dark Side of the Moon is said to sync with The Wizard of Oz. In April 2003, the lineup was changed with the addition of drummer Joe Greenetz. Koch became the band's second guitarist and principal songwriter. October of the same year saw the addition of keyboardist Chris Keene. Mike Leibovich joined to play keyboards months later after Keene left Sherwood to play for Number One Gun. After years of touring with a "Do-it-yourself" attitude, the band chose to sign with Militia Group side-label Sidecho Records, who would release their debut LP. Entitled Sing, But Keep Going and produced at Sonikwire Studios in Irvine, CA by Michael Rosas (singer/guitarist for the band Satisfaction), it sold over 20,000 copies and helped stir up even more attention for the group. In 2005 it was announced that founding guitarist Chris Armstrong was leaving the band. His role was filled on tour first by (former Terminal, now Oh, Sleeper bassist) Lucas Starr and later by their friend Gabe Dutton from Michigan in the summer of '06 and finally by David Provenzano (formerly of the band Fighting Jacks) in February 2007.

As Sing, But Keep Going continued to gain traction, the band began receiving interest from other labels as they went on to play the Vans Warped Tour and sold-out shows across the country. Pushing the envelope even further was AbsolutePunk.net, who released a free downloadable EP in early 2006 that has since been downloaded some 30,000 times. After holding out for the best possible deal, the band surprised its fans and announced that they had signed to the newly formed MySpace Records. Following another summer stint on the Warped Tour, Sherwood spent six weeks in a beach house near Ensenada, Mexico writing for their next LP. The songs written during this time, along with the material they'd released on the Summer EP, were compiled to form a new full-length album, later entitled A Different Light, which was recorded in December 2006 at Motor Studios in San Francisco with producer Lou Giordano and features his daughter Joanna as a violinist in "I'm Asking Her to Stay".

A Different Light was released in March 2007, in the middle of the band's nationwide tour supporting Relient K and Mae. Sherwood spent the rest of the year supporting several other bands they had met on the Warped Tour including Motion City Soundtrack and The Academy Is..., and ended 2007's unrelenting schedule with a tour in England alongside Hellogoodbye and Say Anything.

Sherwood spent 2008 continuing their support of A Different Light with two more European tours, a trip to Japan, and several headlining U.S. tours. In August the band moved to Oakland, CA to begin writing material for their third full-length album, which would be produced by Brad Wood in Los Angeles.

On July 14, 2009, Sherwood announced that their upcoming album would be titled QU and released on October 13. They also posted three new songs from the album to their myspace page.

Also in 2009, Sherwood's song "The Best In Me" was used as the theme to the new MTV show College Life.

Despite rumors of a breakup, in 2010 Sherwood announced at a show that the band would continue on and to expect a new album in the summer of 2012. Soon after, however, the band announced their official break up. On the band's Facebook, they said that they preferred to dedicate the rest of their lives to their families.

On the morning of September 28, 2015, the band announced via their Facebook page that they would be starting an Indiegogo account in order to crowdfund their fourth studio album. Only three of the former five band members were originally featured in the promotional material but a picture was later posted on their Facebook page which featured all five members and followed news of a full band West Coast tour alongside Mike and David's other band Fialta. The band's projection to raise $20,000 was reached in just five days and just under $40,000 in total was raised by the time the campaign ended. The album, Some Things Never Leave You was released on June 17, 2016, kicking off the band's limited reunion tour that year. A 10-year anniversary tour for A Different Light was later scheduled for the fall of 2017.

== Members ==
=== Current ===
- Nate Henry – lead vocals, bass guitar (2002-2012, 2015–present)
- Dan Koch – lead guitar, backing vocals, occasional lead vocals (2003-2012, 2015–present); drums, backing vocals (2002-2003)
- Joe Greenetz – drums, backing vocals (2003-2012, 2015–present)
- Michael Leibovich - keyboards (2005-2012, 2015-present)
- David Provenzano - guitar (2007-2012, 2015-present)

=== Former members ===
- Chris Armstrong – guitar (2002-2005)
- Chris Keene – keyboards, percussion (2004-2005)

=== Former touring members ===
- Gabe Dutton – guitar (2006)
- Billy Dunaway – bass guitar

=== Crew members ===
- Josh Jeter – Miscellaneous, Legal Counsel
- Luke Holton – Sound Engineer, Tour Manager
- Jon Havens – Lights, Merch
- Sarah Shotwell – Guitar Tech, Merch, Literary Advisor

=== Former crew members ===
- Ciara Carlson – Merch Mistress
- Shane Haase – FOH Sound Engineer and Merch
- Will Kent – Lighting Designer and Visual Director
- Sean Porterhouse – Guitar Tech, Tour Manager
- Joshua Monaghan – Guitar Tech

== Musical style ==
The band focuses on creating rock and roll music that can be danced to—upbeat, with nonaggressive passion and a strong nod to classic rock stylings. While the band's original sound has been admitted to be "The Get Up Kids meets Mineral meets Further Seems Forever," the band's detailed list of influences for their current sound is a blend of old-fashioned rock and progressive alternative, with strong ties to standards set by the Beach Boys.

== Other projects ==
- I'll Beat You Up

In the summer of 2005, guitarist Dan Koch and then-guitarist Chris Armstrong released a free online EP under the pseudonym "I'll Beat You Up" through a Myspace page. This farcical project consisted of "screamo" covers of children's melodies, such as the Itsy-Bitsy Spider and selections from Schoolhouse Rock. While it appears to have been a one-time deal, the EP remains available for download on the Myspace page.

- We Shot The Moon

A band from San Diego, California featuring Jonathan Jones, the singer of Waking Ashland, in addition to Dan Koch and Joe Greenetz, both from Sherwood.

- The Sherwood Show

On November 7, 2007 Sherwood released their first pilot episode of their new online show starring Nate Henry, Dan Koch, Joe Greenetz, Mike Leibovich, and Dave Provenzano. The pilot episode can be found on their MySpace blog. They announced that they would be airing a new episode every Wednesday. According to the pilot episode lead singer and bassist Nate Henry started the series.

== Discography ==
=== Albums ===
- 2005: Sing, but Keep Going
- 2007: A Different Light U.S. Heatseekers No. 11, U.S. Independent Albums No. 30
- 2009: QU U.S. Billboard 200 debuted at No. 91, U.S. Independent Albums No. 9
- 2016: Some Things Never Leave You

=== EPs ===
- 2002: A Long Story Short EP
- 2003: These Ruins EP
- 2004: Sherwood EP
- 2006: Summer EP
- 2009: Not Gonna Love EP
