= Hikashu =

Japanese rock band

Hikashu (ヒカシュー) are a Japanese experimental/prog rock band led by pseudo-Kabuki vocalist, Makigami Koichi, known for their highly experimental music. They are often referred to by their alternative English moniker, Hikasu. The group's most recent album, LA LA WHAT, was released in 2021.

== Members & Collaborators ==
=== Current members ===
- Koichi Makigami (巻上 公一) – voice, bass, cornet, theremin
- Mita Freeman (三田 超人(フリーマン)), f.k.a. Masamichi Mitama (海琳 正道) (1978-1991) – guitar, sampler
- Masami Sakaide (坂出 雅海) – bass, laptop computer
- Kazuto Shimizu (清水 一登) – piano, bass clarinet
- Masaharu Sato (佐藤 正治) – percussion, drums, effect voice

=== Past members ===
- Yasushi Yamashita (山下 康) – keyboards, drum machine
- Makoto Inoue (井上 誠) – mellotron, synthesizers
- Satoshi Tobe (戸部 哲) – alto sax
- Toshiro Sensui (泉水 敏郎) – percussion
- Kazuhiro Nomoto (野本 和浩) – sax, bass clarinet; died 15 December 2003
- Masaru Taniguchi (谷口 勝) - drums; died 24 October 1989
- Tsuno-Ken (つの犬), a.k.a. Ken Tsunoda (角田 健) – drums
- Otomo Yoshihide (大友 良英) – turntables
- Torsten Rasch – samplers
- Kouzou Nida (新井田 耕造) – drums
- Makoto Yoshimori (吉森 信) – keyboards

== Discography ==
=== Official releases ===
- Haru [春] (1978) released under the pseudonym "Pre Hikashu"
- Hikashu (1978)
- 20seiki no owarini [20世紀の終わりに] (1979) 7 inch single
- Hikashu (1980)
- Shiroi Highway [白いハイウェイ] (1980) 7 inch single
- Natsu [夏] (1980)
- Uwasa No Jinrui [うわさの人類] (1981)
- Watashi No Tanoshimi [私の愉しみ] (1984)
- Mizu Ni Nagashite [水に流して] (1984)
- Soba De Yokereba [そばでよければ] (1985)
- Nani Mo Kamo Odore [なにもかも踊れ] (1987) cassette
- Ningen No Kao [人間の顔] (1988)
- Teichou Na Omotenashi [丁重なおもてなし] (1990)
- Humming Soon [はなうたはじめ](1991)
- Atchi No Me Kotchi No Me [あっちの目こっちの目] (1993)
- Ten Ten [転々] (2006)
- Nyuunen [入念] (2007) maxi single
- Ikirukoto [生きること] (2008)
- Carps and Gaspacho [鯉とガスパチョ] (2009) maxi single
- Ten Ten Ten [転転々] (2009)
- Uragoe [うらごえ] (2012)
- Bankan [万感] (2013)
- Ikite Koi Chinmoku [生きてこい沈黙] (2015)
- Anguri [あんぐり] (2017)
- Nariyamazu [なりやまず] (2020)
- LA LA WHAT [虹から虹へ] (2021)

=== Compilations ===
- Hikashu Super (1981)
- Changing Like Myxomycetes [かわってる] (1996) self-covers
- Twin Best (1999)
- Hikashu History (2001)
- Hikashu Super 2 [ヒカシュースーパー2] (2014)

=== Other albums ===
- Untitled (1986) an early mini-album
- Hikashu Live (1989) live
- Super Dimension Century Orguss 02 [超時空世紀オーガス02] (1993) soundtrack, reissued in 2012 as Fushigi Wo Mitsumete [不思議をみつめて]
- Retro Active Remix (1996) Hikashu songs remixed by various artists
- Live In Osaka 1-4 (1997) bootleg, four low quality live performances
- Musique Non Stop (1998) a tribute to Kraftwerk featuring Hikashu, Buffalo Daughter, Denki Groove and others
- Radioactive Tribute To Kraftwerk (2002) another tribute, featuring a similar track listing
- End Of The 20th Century (2003) a tribute to Hikashu, featuring Koichi Makigami and others

=== Inoyama Land ===
Inoyama Land is the synth-based duo of Yasushi Yamashita and Makoto Inoue

- Danjindan Posidon (1983)
- Pithecanthropus (1999) live
- Inoyama Land (1997)
- Music For Myxomycetes (1998) accompanying music for the World Of Myxomycetes exposition

=== Makigami Koichi ===
- Minzoku No Saiten [民族の祭典] (1982)
- Koroshi No Blues [殺しのブルース] (1992)
- Kuchinoha [口の歯] (1995)
- Electric Eel (1998) a collaboration with Anton Bruhin
- Koedarake [声だらけ] (2005)
- Jisatsu Na Disco [自殺なディスコ] (2016) Makigami and Mita Freeman

=== Makoto Inoue ===
- Godzilla Legend [ゴジラ伝説] (1983)
- Godzilla Legend II [ゴジラ伝説2] (1984)
- Godzilla Legend III [ゴジラ伝説3] (1984)
- Pygmalio [ピグマリオ] (1985) image album for the Shinji Wada manga of the same name; collaboration with then-current Hikashu lineup, billed as "Makoto Inoue & Hikasu Family"
