= Fialta =

American indie pop band

Fialta is an indie pop band from San Luis Obispo, California. The group consists of David Provenzano and Michael Leibovich (formerly of Sherwood), Beth Clements, and Sarah Shotwell. The band formed in 2011 and released their first full-length album, Summer Winter, in 2013.

The band's name was inspired by the Nabokov story, "Spring in Fialta".

The band has made a name for itself primarily through sync licensing. In 2013, Fialta's song "Summer Winter" was featured in a Kmart television ad, and in 2014, the song "Sleepytime" was used for a Chipotle sponsorship ad for the PBS show, Food Forward. Their music has also been played on the television series Awkward, A to Z, Parenthood, Degrassi, BoJack Horseman, and About a Boy.
