= Jonathan Jones (musician) =

American singer-songwriter (born 1982)

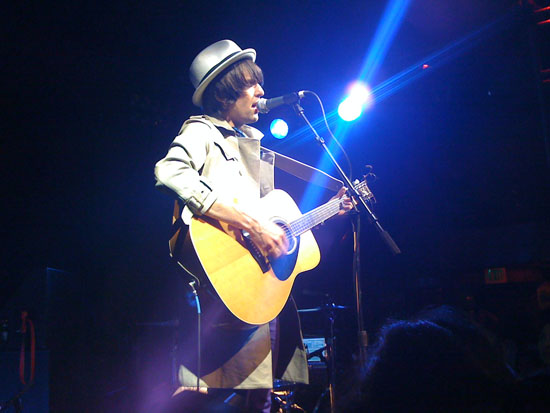

Background information
- Born: Jonathan Jones; October 21, 1982 (age 43)
- Origin: U.S.
- Occupations: Singer, songwriter
- Instruments: Vocals, piano
- Years active: 2003–present
- Member of: We Shot The Moon
- Formerly of: Waking Ashland

Jonathan Jones (born October 21, 1982) is the lead singer, pianist, song writer and co-founder of the alternative rock bands Waking Ashland and We Shot the Moon.

== Personal life ==
Jones lives in Cardiff, California. He is an avid surfer and spends a good deal of time surfing while not on tour.

On Thursday, July 21, 2011, Jones proposed to longtime girlfriend Julie Coy after an afternoon surf session in Cardiff. In 2013 the couple moved to Woodland, California to pursue Julie's studies at the UC Davis School of Veterinary Medicine.

== Music career ==
=== Waking Ashland (2003–2007) ===
In November 2003, he co-founded the rock band Waking Ashland. Together, they released two EP's and two LP's. Their first release was the 2004 debut EP I Am for You. This was followed by a record signing with Tooth and Nail Records, and the LP, Composure in May, 2005. After some band relationship troubles, they made their third release, Telescopes, with temporary band members. In April, 2007, the band released what would be their final album, The Well. In July 2007, Jones, speaking for the band, revealed that the band would no longer stay together.

=== We Shot the Moon (2007–present) ===
We Shot the Moon formed after Jones's previous band, Waking Ashland, broke up. They have released one EP and two LP's. This new band's first release was The Polar Bear and Cougar EP in December 2007. This was followed by their first LP, Fear And Love in April 2008. In early 2009, they entered the studio once again to record their next album. This album, named A Silver Lining, was released on October 6, 2009. On March 5, 2013, the band released a new album called Love On.

=== Solo Projects (2009–present) ===
On February 3, 2009, Jones started selling his solo CD, We Were Young, on various websites and on iTunes. Physical copies of the CD will be available "this fall when [he] does a solo tour". A new solo album, entitled Community Group, was released on June 14, 2011.

In 2013, Jones and Katy McAllister, as the group Old Daisy, released a self-titled album.

In 2015, in collaboration with Randy Carney, under the name Supermassive, he released the album Major Major (online only, through Bandcamp).

Starting in 2015, under the name Bird Passengers, in collaboration with Nate Dodge, he has released several albums.

== Discography ==
With Waking Ashland

- I Am For You (EP) (2004)
- Composure (2005)
- Telescopes (EP) (2006)
- The Well (2007)

With We Shot The Moon

- The Polar Bear and Cougar EP (2007)
- Fear And Love (2008)
- A Silver Lining (2009)
- We are All Odd EP (2012)
- Love and Fear (2012)
- My Favorite Christmas Gift (2012)
- Love On (2013)
- The Finish Line (2014)
- Anna (2014)

With Old Daisy (Katy McAllister)

- Old Daisy (2013)
- Truce EP (2016)

With Lord Klaus (Michael Grimm)

- Cabin EP (2013)

With Supermassive (Danny Carney)

- Major Major (2015)

With Bird Passengers (Nate Dodge)

- Mountain to Cover (2015)
- Brave The Dark EP (2016)
- Bird Passengers EP (2017)
- Lights and the Fire (2018)

With The Long Valley (Dan Koch)

- Our Adventure EP (2016)

Solo

- We Were Young (2009)
- Welcome Home (2010)
- Community Group (2011)
- Christmas In Our Shorts EP (2011)
- Tongue Tied EP (2017)
- Euphoria (2023)

With WSLY

- WSLY (2017)
- Sing Me A Christmas Carol EP (2017)
