= Hiroyuki Hayashi (musician) =

Hiroyuki Hayashi ハヤシヒロユキ
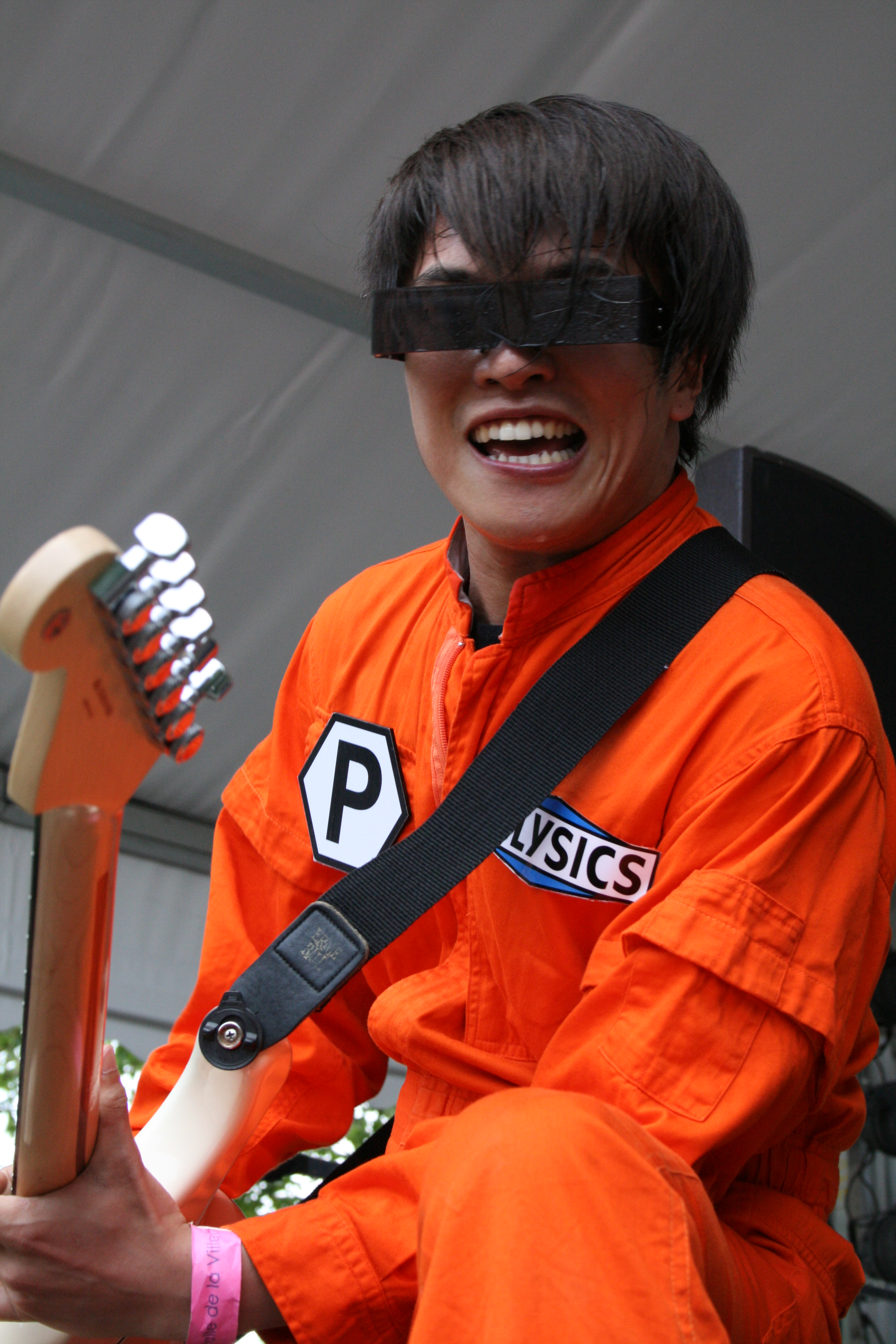
- Hayashi plays Guitar at a POLYSICS live show in 2007

Background information
- Also known as: Hiro, POLY-1
- Born: 8 August 1978 (age 48); Tokyo, Japan
- Genres: New wave; post-punk; electropunk; art punk
- Occupations: Musician; singer; songwriter; composer; DJ
- Instruments: Vocals; guitar; vocoder; programming
- Years active: 1997–present

Hiroyuki Hayashi (ハヤシヒロユキ, Hayashi Hiroyuki; born 8 August 1978 in Tokyo, Japan) is the founder, guitarist, and lead singer of the Japanese new wave rock group, Polysics. He occasionally works as a remix artist under the alias POLY-1. He is known for having very energetic live performances.
