= Waking Ashland =

American rock band

- Waking Ashland in 2005. From left to right: Lallier, Jones, Grosse, Lee

Background information
- Origin: San Diego, California, US
- Genres: Alternative rock, indie rock
- Years active: 2003–2007
- Labels: Immortal, Tooth and Nail
- Spinoffs: We Shot the Moon
- Members: Jonathan Jones; Ryan Lallier; Nate Harold; Tim Very

Waking Ashland was an American rock band from San Diego, California. Formed in 2003, they were signed to Tooth & Nail Records and Immortal Records. In all the group released two EPs and two full-length albums before their disestablishment in 2007. Their final lineup consisted of singer/keyboardist Jonathan Jones, guitarist Ryan Lallier, bassist Nate Harold and drummer Tim Very.

== History ==
Waking Ashland was formed in November 2003 by singer/keyboardist Jonathan Jones, guitarist Ryan Lallier, Clayton Boek, and drummer Thomas Lee. Robert Teegarden — a friend of the band — temporarily helped out to fill the vacant position on the bass guitar. The band name stems from the aspect of connecting people through music, paired with a reference to the town of Ashland, Oregon. Influenced by as diverse acts as Joe Jackson, Coldplay, The Pixies and Hüsker Dü, Waking Ashland combined emotional piano melodies with sonic distortion guitars, creating a unique sound among their genre.

In early 2004, they self-recorded and released their debut EP I Am for You. Simultaneously, the line-up was completed by guitarist Nick Rucker and bassist Derek Vaughn, replacing Teegarden. However, the two soon left the band, and a permanent bassist was found in Andrew Grosse, Jones' former bandmate in their Christian accented high school band Formula316. Without record label distribution and solely through word of mouth promotion, the CD's first pressing of 1,000 copies (being only available through the band's website and at their concerts) sold out within a month. The six-song CD managed to sell over 10,000 copies overall. Its success landed the band a booking agent and allowed them to drop out of college to pursue a career in the music industry. As the result of their constant touring and — due to lucky circumstances — their participating in 2004's Warped Tour, word spread fast and garnered the attention of several record labels, including Tooth & Nail Records. In February 2005, the band supported the Snake the Cross the Crown on their headlining US tour. Tooth & Nail signed Waking Ashland and released their first full-length album Composure — produced by Lou Giordano — in May 2005. The album scanned 2,400 units within its first week of sales, debuting at No. 19 on Nielsen SoundScan's Alternative New Artist chart and at No. 53 on their Top New Artist Album chart. The album also hit No. 29 on the Billboard Top Christian Albums chart.

In July and August 2005, the band supported Action Action on their headlining tour. On September 5, 2005, a statement on the band's website announced that Grosse and Lee had left the band due to in-band conflicts. Temporary touring members included drummers Joe Greenetz from Sherwood and Rob Lynch from Harris, as well as bassists Jon Sullivan from Jack's Mannequin and Trevor Sellers from Number One Gun. In October and November 2005, they supported the Honorary Title on their headlining tour. On February 8, 2006, Waking Ashland released a nine-song EP, titled Telescopes, only in Japan. In March 2006, they went on a brief East Coast tour with Sherwood, This Day and Age, and New Atlantic. They then toured the Southern states with Quietdrive and Daphne Loves Derby throughout April 2006. On May 22, 2006, the band signed to Immortal Records. The label released Telescopes in the United States on June 13, 2006. The Japanese release had two bonus tracks, which were acoustic versions of "October Skies" and "I Am For You" from Composure. While the release featured session musicians to back up Jones and Lallier, a permanent rhythm section was finally announced in a blog on the band's MySpace profile as Nate Harold and Tim Very. They played a few shows with My American Heart and Gatsbys American Dream.

Part of the band's success can be attributed to their pages on MySpace and PureVolume. As of September 2006, Waking Ashland's songs had been played over 1.3 million times on MySpace and over 1.2 million times on PureVolume. Their song "I Am for You" appeared on the first MySpace Records compilation and the Drive Thru Records/PureVolume compilation Bands You Love, Have Heard of, and Should Know.

Waking Ashland's second album, The Well, was released by Immortal Records on April 17, 2007.

On July 9, 2007, Jones announced on their MySpace page that the band had broken up, citing irreconcilable differences. Jones went on to form We Shot the Moon, consisting of him and Trevor Faris (drums), Nathan Miller (guitar), Jason DeLaTorre (guitar), and Adam Lovell (bass). Jones and Lallier also worked on solo projects.

In August 2010, the band got back together to play three reunion concerts.

Former drummer Tim Very, who went on to play in Manchester Orchestra, died on February 14, 2026.

== Members ==
Final line-up

- Jonathan Jones – lead vocals, keyboards, piano
- Ryan Lallier – guitar
- Nate Harold – bass guitar
- Tim Very – drums

Former members

- Andrew Grosse – bass guitar
- Thomas Lee – drums
- Nick Rucker – guitar
- Derek Vaughn – bass guitar
- Robert Teegarden – bass guitar
- Clayton Boek – guitar
- Brandon Beebe – guitar

== Discography ==
Albums

- Composure (2005)
- The Well (2007)

EPs

- I Am for You (2004)
- Telescopes (2006)

Singles

- "I Am for You"
- "Hands on Deck"
- "Julian"
- "Your Intentions"

Compilations

- Drive-Thru Records And Purevolume.com: Bands You Love, Have Heard Of, And Should Know (2005)
- Nano-Mugen Compilation 2006
