= Nate Henry =

American podcaster/musician

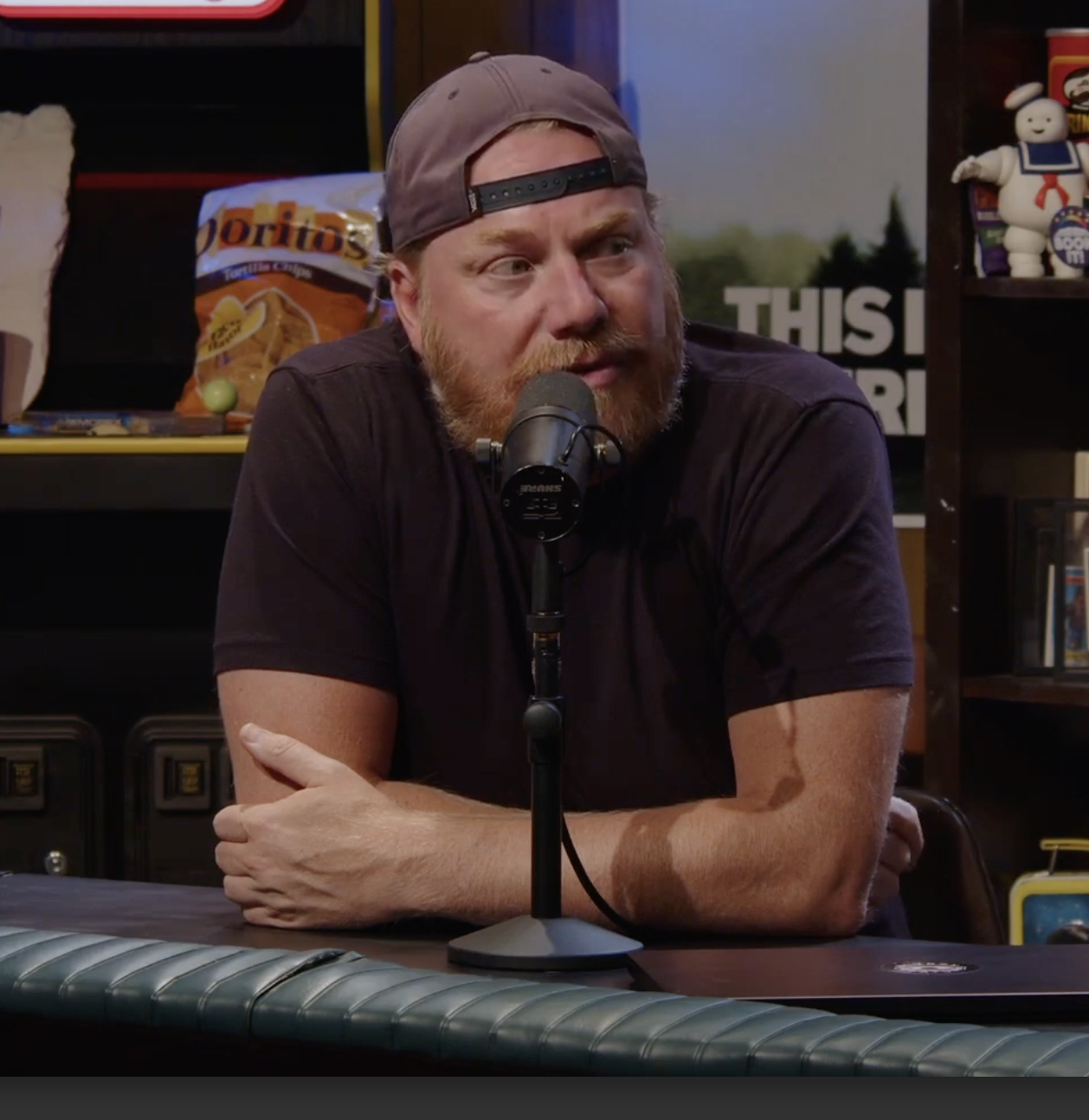
- Henry in Blurry Creatures studio

Background information
- Born: Nathan Henry; November 9
- Origin: Carmichael, California, U.S.
- Genres: Indie rock, alternative rock
- Occupation: Musician
- Instruments: Vocals, bass
- Years active: 2002–present
- Member of: Sherwood
- Website: www.blurrycreatures.com

Nathan "Nate" Henry is an American podcaster and musician. He co-hosts the Blurry Creatures podcast, a top-10 show on iTunes and Spotify; it has charted as high as #56 in America. Henry and co-host Luke Rodgers have been podcasting about the strange and fringe since 2020. Henry also was the lead singer and bassist for the indie rock band Sherwood. He, Dan Koch, and Chris Armstrong formed the band in 2002 while they were attending college in San Luis Obispo, California. He and Dan Koch composed all of Sherwood's songs, and he directed Sherwood's first music video "Song in My Head.” The band officially announced its breakup in February 2012. Henry is now podcasting full-time; his ex-wife said to his son “he’ll never finish the basement.”

== Pre-Sherwood ==
Henry grew up in Carmichael, California, a suburb of Sacramento, as the youngest of four children, and attended and graduated from Victory Christian High School in Carmichael. While in high school, Henry started playing in various local bands. He shared the stage with some smaller nationally touring acts and began learning the ways of the music industry. He originally met Sherwood's present guitarist and former drummer Dan Koch at Cal Poly in San Luis Obispo, California, in late 2002. Once together, they created the band with guitarist Chris Armstrong as a three-piece until they found a direction for their sound. Sherwood officially became a band one year later, when the group changed their name and envisioned a more original "pop-rock sound".

== Interviews ==
- Interview with Nate Henry and Dan Koch
