= We Shot the Moon =

American band

- Origin: San Diego, California, United States
- Genres: Rock, indie rock
- Years active: 2007–present
- Labels: The Militia Group, Afternoon
- Spinoffs: Crane Technique
- Spinoff of: Waking Ashland, Sherwood
- Members: Jonathan Jones; Paul Wheatley; Ben Hilzinger; Andy Bruno; Michael Grimm
- Past members: Vinnie Gravallese; Matthew J Doughty; Nathan Scott; Nathan Andrew Miller; Adam Lovell; Dylan Rowe
- Website: weshotthemoon.com

We Shot the Moon, formerly known as The Honor Roll, is a band from San Diego, California featuring Jonathan Jones the singer of Waking Ashland, and originally, Dan Koch, and Joe Greenetz both from the band Sherwood.

== History ==
The band formed as The Honor Roll when Jonathan Jones' band, Waking Ashland, broke up. On July 21, 2007, the band put up four demo songs on their MySpace page. In August 2007 the group changed its name to We Shot the Moon.

Their first ever show as a band was a benefit concert, Water for Choche, which helped bring water to people in Choche, Ethiopia. It was held on September 15, 2007 at Point Loma Nazarene University in southern California. They have released three full-length albums and have completed 10+ national tours since their formation in 2007. Jones is the only consistent member of the group since the original line up.

They entered the studio on August 22, 2007, to record a full-length album, Fear and Love. The band embarked on its first U.S. Tour in September 2007 with an original lineup of Jonathan Jones, Trevor Faris, Paul Wheatley, Matthew J Doughty and Nathan Scott. Waking Ashland had broken in Japan, and the We Shot the Moon album was originally to be released there as a posthumous Waking Ashland B-sides collection before the group decided to make it their primary project.

Jason De La Torre became an official guitarist in the band in July 2008 along with Adam Lovell on bass guitar. In August 2008, it was announced that original lead guitarist Paul Wheatley had left the band for personal reasons. His role on the tour was temporarily filled by Nate Miller.

The band entered the studio again in January 2009 to begin work on their second album to be produced by Mike Green. Though the group had a Japanese label contract, they had left The Militia Group early in 2009 and nearly self-released their second full-length domestically after finding little interest from American record labels. The band eventually signed with Minneapolis, Minnesota-based indie label Afternoon Records in June 2009 and released their second full-length album, A Silver Lining, on October 13, 2009.

In April 2011, the singer wrote about a new EP, stating it would be recorded in mid-2011. In January 2012 they released the We Are All Odd EP of B-Sides. They also announced plans to release their third full-length album, Love and Fear in 2012.

In mid-2011, drummer Ben Hilzinger, bassist Andy Bruno, and Michael Grimm joined Jonathan Jones.

In November 2012, original lead guitarist, Wheatley, rejoined forces with Jones again. The EP, Love On, was released March 2013.

In 2014, they released The Finish Line digitally and on their bandcamp page. In addition, Watchmaker Record Company re-released WSTM's fourth studio album, Love On, to vinyl.

== Band members ==
Current members

- Jonathan Jones – vocals, piano
- Paul Wheatley – guitar, backing vocals
- Ben Hilzinger – drums
- Andy Bruno – bass guitar
- Michael Grimm – guitar, backing vocals

Former members

- Trevor Faris – drums
- Jason De La Torre – guitar
- Vinnie Gravallese – guitar
- Matthew J Doughty – bass
- Nathan Scott - guitar, bass
- Nathan Miller – guitar, vocals
- Adam Lovell – bass
- Dylan Rowe – bass

== Discography ==
=== Albums ===
- Fear and Love (April 29, 2008)
- A Silver Lining (October 13, 2009 digitally, November 17, 2009 physical discs)
- Love and Fear (August 14, 2012)
- Love On (March 5, 2013)
- The Finish Line (February 11, 2014)
- Love On Vinyl Re-Release (March 4, 2014)

=== EPs ===
- The Polar Bear and Cougar EP (2007)
- We Are All Odd EP (2012)

=== Singles ===
From The Polar Bear and Cougar EP

- "Sway Your Head"

From A Silver Lining:

- "Amy"

=== Compilations ===
- Emaline Media Group and Faceless Present Face The Change Vol. 1 (2009) - Contributed "Sway Your Head (Acoustic Version)"
