= Dan Koch =

American guitarist

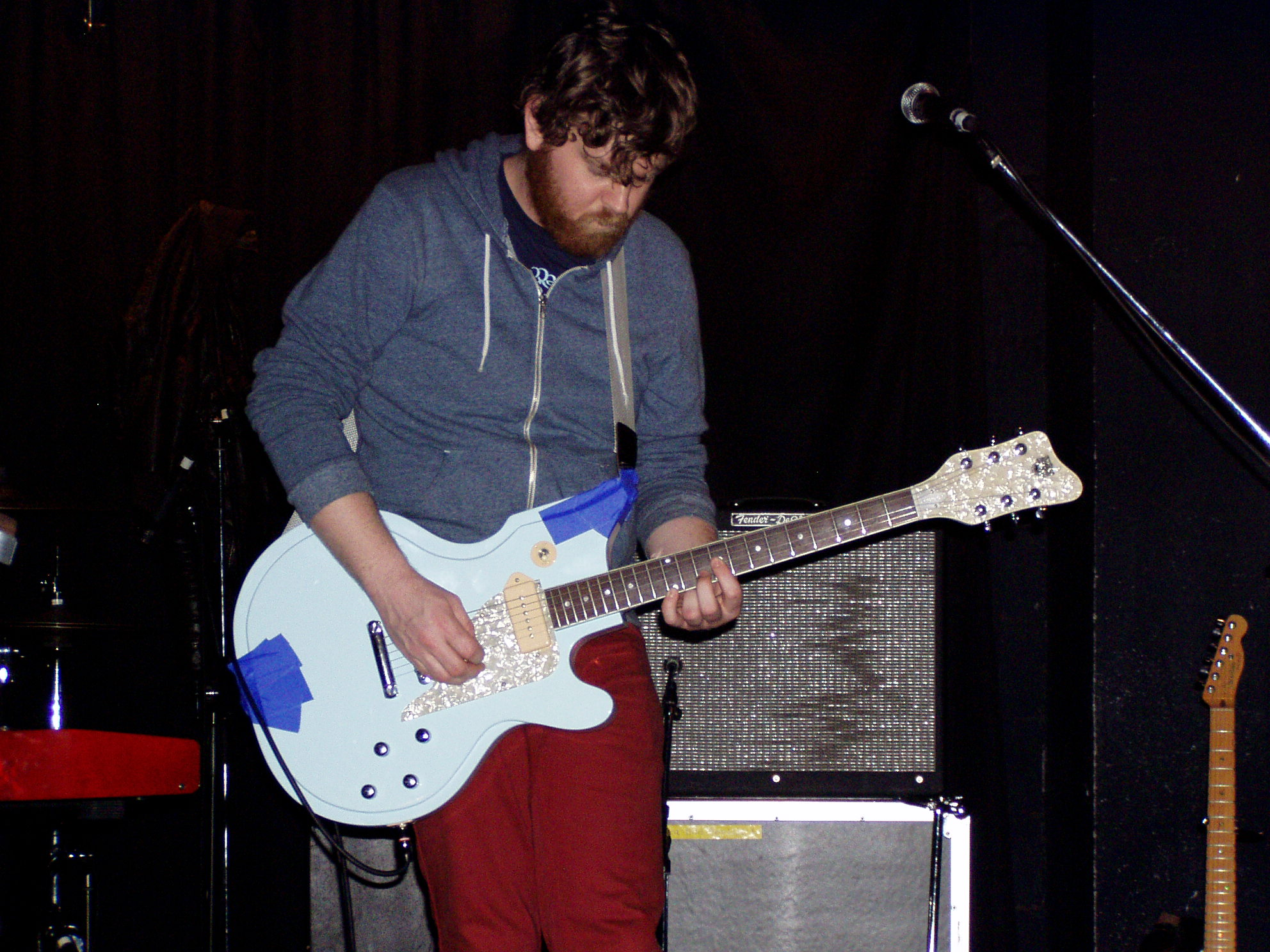
- Dan Koch performing with Sherwood at the Apollo Theatre in Nagoya, Japan

Background information
- Born: Daniel Koch; 1983 (age 42–43)
- Origin: Los Gatos, California, U.S.
- Genres: Indie rock, alternative rock
- Occupation: Guitarist
- Years active: 2002–present
- Website: dankochwords.com

Dan Koch is an American musician and podcaster. He hosts the You Have Permission and Pretty Good Vibrations podcasts and previously co-hosted the Depolarize! and Reconstruct podcasts. He was the lead guitarist, vocalist, and principal songwriter for the rock band Pacific Gold. He formed the band Sherwood with Nate Henry in 2002 while attending university at Cal Poly in San Luis Obispo, California. Koch was originally Sherwood's drummer, but when drummer Joe Greenetz joined the band he switched from drums to guitar. Moreover, Koch transitioned into the rhythm guitar player. With the departure of Chris Armstrong, Koch switched into the role of lead guitarist. Dan Koch is a native of Los Gatos, California. He married Jaffrey Bagge on November 29, 2009. The couple resides in Seattle, Washington. Dan has composed music for commercials and other advertising since 2012.

== Band formation ==
Koch was friends with Nate Henry and Chris Armstrong while they were attending college in San Luis Obispo, California. He began as the principal songwriter of Sherwood, but over the course of three full-length albums, the songwriting duties were shared with bassist/lead singer Nate Henry and keyboard player Mike Leibovich. With the band's addition of Joe Greenetz as the drummer this also inclined Dan to switch to guitar. Koch has a full beard, which led to the nickname "Beardy." He attended The King's Academy in Sunnyvale, California and graduated in 2001.

== Present-day work ==
Dan has been a part of 3 side projects. One titled "More important than Music" being a blog originally set up on blogspot.com but later moved to worldpress.com account. It is mainly devoted to charity organizations. Another project, "I'll Beat You up" was set up by Koch and Sherwood's former guitarist Chris Armstrong. A free EP was released on their page. Koch is a studio member of Jonathan Jones' We Shot the Moon. Koch also started a series of podcasts titled "Beards in a Band" with drummer Joe Greenetz in addition to the "Apples and Oranges" series started by lead singer and bassist Nate Henry and keyboardist Mike Leibovich. He is currently playing for the newly formed act, Pacific Gold (formerly known as Wayfarer).

In 2021, Koch released a new music project titled Havana Swim Club. Koch described the process of digital "crate digging" in this sample-heavy electronic music sound. Music blog EarToTheGround Music described the new album as, "lush, harmonic, atmospheric electronic music."

He runs two podcasts: "Pretty Good Vibrations", which is devoted to the role music plays in people's lives; and "You Have Permission", which is mainly devoted to religion, especially Christianity, and how it reacts with the social sciences.
