= MySpace Records =

Defunct musical record label (2005–2016)

- Parent company: Myspace
- Founded: 2005; 21 years ago
- Founder: Tom Anderson
- Defunct: 2016; 10 years ago
- Distributors: Fontana Distribution; Interscope
- Genre: Various
- Country of origin: U.S.
- Location: Beverly Hills, California
- Official website: www.myspace.com/myspacerecords

MySpace Records was a record label founded in 2005 to sign artists who appeared on the social networking site Myspace. It was a wholly owned subsidiary of Myspace, operating as a joint-venture between MySpace and Interscope Records. Distribution is contracted to Universal Music Group's Fontana Distribution, with manufacturing and external marketing by Universal's Interscope.

MySpace Records operated in Beverly Hills, California. The president was MySpace co-founder Tom Anderson until he left the company in 2009. The company was shut down in December 2016.

== Milestones ==
In March 2008, MySpace Records released Pennywise's ninth album, Reason to Believe. A partnership with corporate sponsor Textango meant that MySpace Records provided fans with a free download of the album during a two-week period in exchange for adding the sponsor as a friend on MySpace.com. In 2009, Jeremy Greene released his single "Rain" featuring Pitbull that became the #1 song on MySpace in its prime.

== Former artists ==
- Adventure Galley
- Call the Cops
- Kate Voegele
- Meiko
- Disco Curtis
- Zendy Yunoki
- Jeremy Greene
- Jordyn Taylor
- Christina Milian
- Mateo
- Bossman
- Mickey Avalon
- Nico Vega
- Pennywise
- Polysics
- Sherwood
- Dirt Nasty
- Set To Fall
- Tray

== Compilations ==
MySpace Records
Volume 1

1. AFI — "Rabbits are Roadkill on Rt. 37"
2. New Years Day — "Ready, Aim, Misfire"
3. Socratic — "Lunch for the Sky"
4. The Click Five — "Angel to You"
5. Say Anything — "Every Man Has a Molly"
6. Fall Out Boy — "Nobody Puts Baby in the Corner (Acoustic)"
7. Dashboard Confessional — "Hands Down"
8. Waking Ashland — "I Am for You"
9. Weezer — "We Are All on Drugs"
10. Hollywood Undead — "No. 5"
11. Against Me! — "Don't Lose Touch"
12. Tila Tequila — "Straight Up"
13. The All-American Rejects — "Stab My Back"
14. The Summer Obsession — "Melt the Sugar"
15. Plain White T's — "Take Me Away"
16. Copeland — "Pin Your Wings"
17. Jupiter Sunrise — "Arthur Nix"
