= Switchfoot discography =

Christian rock band discography

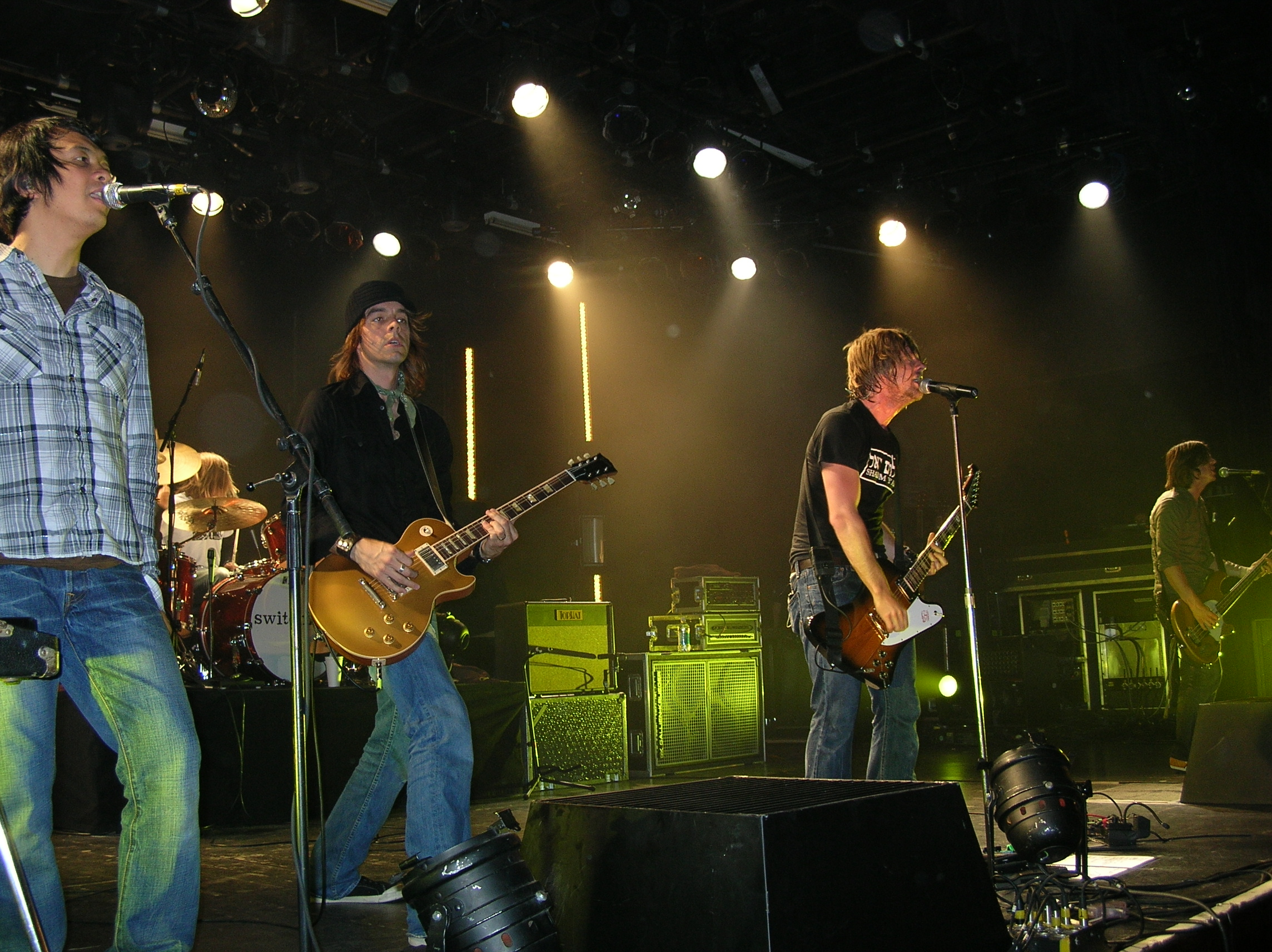
- Switchfoot performing live
- Studio albums: 14
- Extended plays: 10
- Live albums: 4
- Compilation albums: 3
- Singles: 43
- B-sides: 17
- Music videos: 39

The discography of American alternative rock band Switchfoot consists of 14 studio albums, four live albums, three compilation albums, five video albums, 10 extended plays, 43 singles, nine promotional singles and 39 music videos. The band, originally called Chin Up, consists of singer/rhythm guitarist and primary songwriter Jon Foreman, bassist Tim Foreman, drummer Chad Butler, synthesizer/keyboardist/guitarist Jerome Fontamillas, and lead guitarist Boaz Roberts. Lead guitarist Drew Shirley left the band in February 2022.

== Albums ==
=== Studio albums ===
List of studio albums, with selected chart positions and certifications
Title	Album details	Peak chart positions										Certifications	Album sales
Title	Album details	US	US Alt.	US Christ.	US Rock	US Hol	AUS	CAN	JPN	NZ	UK	Certifications	Album sales
The Legend of Chin	Release date: June 17, 1997; Label: Re:Think, Sparrow; Formats: CD, CS, DL	—	—	—	—	—	—	—	—	—	—		
New Way to Be Human	Release date: March 11, 1999; Label: Re:Think, Sparrow; Formats: CD, LP, DL	— (Note: "New Way to Be Human" did not enter the Billboard 200, but peaked at No. 31 on the Billboard Top Heatseekers)	—	21	—	—	—	—	—	—	—		
Learning to Breathe	Release date: September 26, 2000; Label: Re:Think, Sparrow; Formats: CD, LP, DL	— (Note: "Learning to Breathe" did not enter the Billboard 200, but peaked at No. 34 on the Billboard Top Heatseekers)	—	23	—	—	—	—	—	—	—	RIAA: Gold	US: 500,000
The Beautiful Letdown	Release date: February 25, 2003; Label: Columbia, Sony BMG; Formats: CD, CS, LP, DL	16	—	1	—	—	45	—	—	—	—	RIAA: 3× Platinum; MC: Gold	US: 3,000,000
Nothing Is Sound	Release date: September 13, 2005; Label: Columbia, Sony BMG; Formats: CD, DualDisc, CS, LP, DL	3	—	1	—	—	25	20	73	31	—	RIAA: Gold	US: 549,000
Oh! Gravity.	Release date: December 26, 2006; Label: Columbia, Sony BMG; Formats: CD, CS, LP, DL	18	—	1	4	—	74	—	—	—	—		US: 292,000
Hello Hurricane	Release date: November 10, 2009; Label: lowercase people, Atlantic; Formats: CD, LP, DL	13	3	2	4	—	—	—	—	13	—		US: 230,000
Vice Verses	Release date: September 27, 2011; Label: lowercase people, Atlantic; Formats: CD, LP, DL	8	3	1	3	—	62	30	—	31	127		US: 188,000
Fading West	Release date: January 14, 2014; Label: lowercase people, Atlantic; Formats: CD, LP, DL	6	1	1	2	—	50	12	—	27	—		US: 94,000
Where the Light Shines Through	Release date: July 8, 2016; Label: Vanguard; Formats: CD, LP, DL	10	3	1	3	—	34	20	—	— (Note: Where the Light Shines Through did not enter the NZ Top 40 Albums Chart, but peaked at number 1 on the NZ Heatseekers Albums Chart.)	—		US: 29,000
Native Tongue	Release date: January 18, 2019; Label: Fantasy; Formats: CD, LP, DL	41	5	2	4	—	— (Note: Native Tongue did not enter the ARIA Albums Chart, but peaked at number 20 on the ARIA Digital Albums Chart.)	—	—	—	—		
Interrobang	Release date: August 20, 2021; Label: Fantasy; Formats: CD, LP, DL	— (Note: Interrobang did not enter the Billboard 200, but peaked at number 36 on the Billboard Album Sales Chart.)	—	6	—	—	—	—	—	—	—		US: 3,000
Forever Now	Released: June 26, 2026; Label: By Design, BMG; Formats: CD, LP, DL	— (Note: Forever Now did not enter the Billboard 200, but peaked at number 25 on the Billboard Album Sales Chart.)	—	4	—	—	—	—	—	—	—		
"—" denotes a recording that did not chart or was not released in that territory.

=== Re-recorded albums ===
List of re-recorded albums
Title	Album details
The Beautiful Letdown (Our Version)	Released: May 5, 2023; Label: lowercase people; Formats: CD, LP, DL

=== Holiday albums ===
List of holiday albums
Title	Album details
This Is Our Christmas Album	Released: November 4, 2022; Label: lowercase people; Formats: CD, LP, DL

=== Live albums ===
List of live albums
Title	Album details
Best of Bootlegs, Vol. 1	Released: March 31, 2008 (US); Label: lowercase people; Formats: CD, digital download
The Best Yet Live in Nashville	Released: 2009 (US); Label: lowercase people; Formats: CD, digital download
Hello Hurricane Live	Disc two of Vice Verses: Deluxe Edition; Released: September 27, 2011; Label: lowercase people; Formats: CD
Live in Manila (Split EP with Relient K)	Released: September 2016; Label: Cure International; Formats: CD (only available via donation to Cure International)
Live in Chicago: The Looking for America Tour	Released: October 2016; Label: lowercase people; Formats: Digital download

=== Compilation albums ===
List of compilation albums, with selected chart positions and certifications
Title	Album details	Peak chart positions		Certifications
Title	Album details	US	US Christ.	Certifications
The Early Years: 1997–2000	Released: November 2, 2004 (US); Label: Re:Think, Sparrow; Formats: CD box set	—	20	RIAA: Gold
The Best Yet	Released: November 4, 2008 (US); Label: Columbia, Sony, Credential; Formats: CD, digital download	123	9	
Playlist: The Very Best of Switchfoot	Released: May 21, 2013 (US); Label: Columbia/Legacy; Formats: CD	—	—	
20th Century Masters: The Millennium Collection: The Best of Switchfoot	Released: July 31, 2015; Label: Capitol CMG; Formats: CD	—	—	
"—" denotes a recording that did not chart or was not released in that territory.

=== Video albums ===
List of video albums, with selected chart positions and certifications
Title	Album details	Certifications
Switchfootage	Released: 2003 (US); Label: Self-released; Formats: DVD	
Live in San Diego	Released: March 23, 2004 (US); Label: Columbia, Sony BMG; Formats: DVD	RIAA: Gold
Switchfootage 2	Released: 2006 (US); Label: Columbia, Sony BMG; Formats: DVD	
Live at the Ventura Theatre	Released: 2007 (US); Label: lowercase people; Formats: DVD	
The Best Yet: Live	Released: December 4, 2009 (US); Label: lowercase people; Formats: DVD	

== Extended plays ==
List of extended plays, with selected chart positions
Title	Details	Peak chart positions				
Title	Details	US	US Alt.	US Christ.	US Dance	US Rock
Live EP	Released: March 9, 2004 (US); Label: Columbia, Sony BMG; Formats: Digital download	—	—	—	—	—
Oh! EP	Released: October 17, 2006 (US); Label: Self-released; Formats: CD	—	—	—	—	—
Building a Hurricane	Released: 2009 (US); Label: lowercase people; Formats: CD	—	—	—	—	—
iTunes Session	Released: August 30, 2010 (US); Label: lowercase people, Atlantic; Formats: Digital download	—	—	17	—	—
Eastern Hymns for Western Shores	Released: December 7, 2010 (US); Label: lowercase people; Formats: CD	—	—	—	—	—
Live at the John Perkins Benefit	Released: February 7, 2012; Label: lowercase people; Formats: Digital download	—	—	—	—	—
Vice Re-Verses	Released: April 21, 2012 (US); Label: lowercase people, Atlantic; Formats: CD, digital download	—	—	33	19	—
Backstage EP	Released: December 2012 (US); Label: lowercase people; Formats: CD	—	—	—	—	—
Fading West (EP)	Released: September 17, 2013 (US); Label: lowercase people, Atlantic; Formats: CD, digital download; Preview of Fading West LP	—	—	—	—	—
Backstage EP #2	Released: November 25, 2013 (US); Label: lowercase people; Formats: Digital download	—	—	—	—	—
The Edge of the Earth: Unreleased Songs From the Film Fading West	Released: September 9, 2014; Label: lowercase people, Atlantic; Formats: Digital download	39	6	3	—	11
Live From the NATIVE TONGUE Tour	Released: May 31, 2019; Label: Fantasy; Formats: Digital download	—	—	— (Note: Live From The NATIVE TONGUE Tour - EP did not chart on the Billboard Top Christian Albums chart, but peaked at number 46 on the Top Christian Album Sales chart.)	—	—
Native Tongue (Reimagine / Remix)	Released: January 17, 2020; Label: Fantasy; Formats: Digital download	—	—	—	—	—
Covers	Released: June 19, 2020; Formats: Digital download; Label: Fantasy	—	—	—	—	—
"—" denotes a recording that did not chart or was not released in that territory.

== Singles ==
=== 1990s ===
List of singles, with selected chart positions and certifications, showing year released and album name
Title	Year	Album
"Chem 6A"	1997	The Legend of Chin
"New Way to Be Human"	1999	New Way to Be Human

=== 2000s ===
List of singles, with selected chart positions and certifications, showing year released and album name
Title	Year	Peak chart positions									Certifications	Album
Title	Year	US	US Adult Pop	US Alt.	US Christ.	US Christ. Rock	US Rock	AUS	NLD	UK	Certifications	Album
"You Already Take Me There"	2000	—	—	—	—	—	—	—	—	—		Learning to Breathe
"Meant to Live"	2003	18	5	5	— (Note: "Meant to Live" did not enter the Hot Christian Songs chart, but peaked at number nine on the Christian Digital Song Sales chart.)	—	—	52	92	29	RIAA: Gold	The Beautiful Letdown
"More Than Fine"	2003	—	—	—	36	—	—	—	—	—		The Beautiful Letdown
"Gone"	2003	—	—	—	27	—	—	—	—	—		The Beautiful Letdown
"Ammunition"	2003	—	—	—	—	—	—	—	—	—		The Beautiful Letdown
"Dare You to Move"	2004	17	6	9	37	—	— (Note: "Dare You to Move" did not enter the Hot Rock Songs chart, but peaked at number 22 on the Rock Digital Song Sales chart.)	35	—	117	RIAA: Gold	The Beautiful Letdown
"This Is Your Life"	2004	—	36	30	9	—	—	—	—	—		The Beautiful Letdown
"Stars"	2005	68	15	16	25	—	—	43	—	—	RIAA: Gold	Nothing Is Sound
"We Are One Tonight"	2006	—	29	—	11	—	—	—	—	—		Nothing Is Sound
"Dirty Second Hands"	2006	—	—	—	—	—	—	—	—	—		Oh! Gravity.
"Oh! Gravity."	2006	— (Note: "Oh! Gravity." did not enter the Billboard Hot 100, but peaked at number 11 on the Bubbling Under Hot 100 Singles chart.)	—	36	26	8	—	—	—	—		Oh! Gravity.
"Awakening"	2007	—	—	—	16	6	—	—	—	—		Oh! Gravity.
"Head over Heels (In This Life)"	2007	—	—	—	22	—	—	—	—	—		Oh! Gravity.
"This Is Home"	2008	—	—	—	14	—	—	—	—	—		The Chronicles of Narnia: Prince Caspian (Original Motion Picture Soundtrack)
"Mess of Me"	2009	—	—	13	30	1	22	—	—	—		Hello Hurricane
"Always"	2009	—	—	—	16	—	—	—	—	—		Hello Hurricane
"—" denotes a recording that did not chart or was not released in that territory.

=== 2010s ===
List of singles, with selected chart positions and certifications, showing year released and album name
Title	Year	Peak chart positions								Album
Title	Year	US	US Adult Pop	US Alt.	US Christ.	US Christ. Airplay	US Christ. Rock	US Christ. Digital	US Rock	Album
"The Sound (John M. Perkins' Blues)"	2010	—	—	7	— (Note: "The Sound (John M. Perkins' Blues)" did not enter the Hot Christian Songs chart, but peaked at number 32 on the Christian Digital Song Sales chart.)	—	1	32	15	Hello Hurricane
"Your Love Is a Song"	2010	—	27	—	18		—	3	— (Note: "Your Love Is a Song" did not enter the Hot Rock Songs chart, but peaked at number 35 on the Rock Digital Song Sales chart.)	Hello Hurricane
"Bullet Soul"	2010	—	—	40	—	—	13	—	—	Hello Hurricane
"Dark Horses"	2011	— (Note: "Dark Horses" did not enter the Billboard Hot 100, but peaked at number 13 on the Bubbling Under Hot 100 Singles chart.)	—	5	— (Note: "Dark Horses" did not enter the Hot Christian Songs chart, but peaked at number two on the Christian Digital Song Sales chart.)	—	1	2	17	Vice Verses
"Restless"	2011	—	—	— (Note: "Restless" did not enter the Alternative Songs chart, but peaked at number 15 on the Alternative Digital Song Sales chart.)	23		—	2	— (Note: "Restless" did not enter the Hot Rock Songs chart, but peaked at number 25 on the Rock Digital Song Sales chart.)	Vice Verses
"Afterlife"	2012	—	—	19	28		1	17	33	Vice Verses
"The Original"	2012	—	—	39	—	—	1	—	—	Vice Verses
"Where I Belong"	2012	—	—	—	—	—	—	48	—	Vice Verses
"Who We Are"	2013	—	—	16	13	—	—	1	28	Fading West
"Love Alone Is Worth the Fight"	2013	—	—	—	6	14	13	2	21	Fading West
"Let It Out"	2014	—	—	—	35	29	9	—	—	Fading West
"When We Come Alive"	2014	—	—	—	29	34	17	29	—	Fading West
"Fading West"	2015	—	—	—	—	—	—	—	—	The Edge of the Earth: Unreleased Songs From the Film Fading West
"Against the Voices"	2015	—	—	—	—	—	—	—	—	The Edge of the Earth: Unreleased Songs From the Film Fading West
"The Edge of the Earth"	2015	—	—	—	—	—	—	—	—	The Edge of the Earth: Unreleased Songs From the Film Fading West
"Live It Well"	2016	—	—	—	18	13	18	12	39	Where the Light Shines Through
"Float"	2016	—	—	—	34	—	2	—	—	Where the Light Shines Through
"Where the Light Shines Through"	2016	—	—	—	43	—	—	—	—	Where the Light Shines Through
"I Won't Let You Go"	2016	—	—	—	45	20	—	—	—	Where the Light Shines Through
"Shake This Feeling"	2017	—	—	—	—	—	—	—	—	Where the Light Shines Through
"If the House Burns Down Tonight"	2017	—	—	—	—	—	—	—	—	Where the Light Shines Through
"Shine Like Gold" (with Lifehouse)	2017	—	—	—	—	—	—	—	—	Non-album single
"You Found Me"	2018	—	—	—	50	36	30	—	—	Unbroken: Path to Redemption
"Native Tongue"	2018	—	—	— (Note: "Native Tongue" did not enter the Alternative Songs chart, but peaked at number 25 on the Alternative Digital Song Sales chart.)	25	27	4	11	—	Native Tongue
"Voices"	2018	—	—	—	47	—	—	22	—	Native Tongue
"All I Need"	2018	—	—	—	34	—	—	—	—	Native Tongue
"Let It Happen"	2019	—	—	—	48	—	—	—	—	Native Tongue
"The Strength to Let Go"	2019	—	—	—	49	32	—	—	—	Native Tongue
"Voices" (featuring Lindsey Stirling)	2019	—	—	—	34	—	—	—	—	Native Tongue (Reimagine / Remix)
"—" denotes a recording that did not chart or was not released in that territory.

=== 2020s ===
List of singles, with selected chart positions and certifications, showing year released and album name
Title	Year	Peak chart positions				Album
Title	Year	US Alt.	US Christ.	US Christ. Airplay	BOL Ang. Air.	Album
"Swim Good" (Frank Ocean cover)	2020	—	—	—	—	Covers
"Harmony Hall" (Vampire Weekend cover)	2020	—	—	—	—	Covers
"Lucky Man" (The Verve cover)	2020	—	—	—	—	Covers
"Joy Invincible" (original or featuring Jenn Johnson)	2020	—	37	49	—	Native Tongue
"I Need You (To Be Wrong)"	2021	—	45	—	—	Interrobang
"Fluorescent"	2021	—	—	—	—	Interrobang
"The Bones of Us"	2021	—	—	—	—	Interrobang
"If I Were You"	2021	—	—	—	—	Interrobang
"Interrobang"	2022	—	—	—	—	Interrobang (B-Sides)
"Youth of the Young"	2022	—	—	—	—	Interrobang (B-Sides)
"Wake Up, Mr. Crow"	2026	—	—	—	—	Forever Now
"Absolution"	2026	26	—	—	15	Forever Now
"Beautiful Life"	2026	—	—	38	—	Forever Now
"Trenches" (with Anberlin)	2026	—	—	—	—	Currency
"—" denotes a recording that did not chart or was not released in that territory.

=== Promotional singles ===
List of promotional singles, showing year released and album name
Title	Year	Album
"Underwater"	1997	The Legend of Chin
"Home"	1997	The Legend of Chin
"Ode to Chin"	1997	The Legend of Chin
"Incomplete"	1999	New Way to Be Human
"I Turn Everything Over"	1999	New Way to Be Human
"Something More (Augustine's Confession)"	1999	New Way to Be Human
"Love Is the Movement"	2000	Learning to Breathe
"Learning to Breathe"	2000	Learning to Breathe
"Lonely Nation"	2005	Nothing Is Sound
"Another Christmas (Old Borego)"	2008	Nothing Is Sound (Note: "Another Christmas (Old Borego)" was available on Nothing Is Sound copies purchased at Walmart.)

== Other charted songs ==
List of songs, with selected chart positions, showing year released and album name
Title	Year	Peak chart positions		Album
Title	Year	US Christ.	US Christ. Digital	Album
"Dare You To Move (iTunes Session)"	2010	—	39	iTunes Session
"Ba55"	2013	25	7	Fading West EP
"The World You Want"	2014	49	—	Fading West
"Slipping Away"	2014	48	—	Fading West
"All or Nothing at All"	2014	45	—	Fading West
"Lost 'Cause"	2021	48	—	Interrobang

== Music videos ==
Year	Title	Director(s)	Album	Source
1997	"Chem 6a"	Stephen Lewis	The Legend of Chin	Watch
1999	"New Way to Be Human"	Brandon Dickerson	New Way to Be Human	Watch
1999	"Company Car"	Scott Mortensen	New Way to Be Human	Watch
2000	"You Already Take Me There"	Brandon Dickerson	Learning to Breathe	Watch
2003	"Meant to Live" (Live Version)	E.E. Kennedy and Chad Butler	The Beautiful Letdown	Watch
2003	"Meant to Live"	Laurent Briet	The Beautiful Letdown	Watch
2004	"Meant to Live" (Spider-Man 2 Version)		The Beautiful Letdown	Watch
2004	"Dare You to Move" (Version 1)	Robert Hales	The Beautiful Letdown	Watch
2004	"Dare You to Move" (Version 2)	Marc Webb	The Beautiful Letdown	Watch
2005	"Stars"	Scott Speer	Nothing Is Sound	Watch
2005	"Stars" (Live Version)		Nothing Is Sound	Watch
2005	"Happy Is a Yuppie Word"	Scott Speer	Nothing Is Sound	Watch
2006	"We Are One Tonight" (Fan Montage Version)		Nothing Is Sound	Watch
2006	"We Are One Tonight"	Jon Watts	Nothing Is Sound	Watch
2006	"The Blues"	Andy Barron	Nothing Is Sound	Watch
2006	"Oh! Gravity."	P.R. Brown	Oh! Gravity.	Watch
2007	"Awakening"	Brandon Dickerson	Oh! Gravity.	Watch
2008	"This Is Home"	Brandon Dickerson	The Chronicles of Narnia: Prince Caspian	Watch
2008	"This Is Home" (Version 2)	Erwin brothers	The Best Yet	Watch
2009	"Mess of Me" (Live Version)	Andy Barron	Hello Hurricane	Watch
2009	"Mess of Me" (Official Version)	Paul Kerby	Hello Hurricane	Watch
2009	"The Sound (John M. Perkins' Blues)" (Live Version)		Hello Hurricane	Watch
2010	"Always"	Chad Butler	Hello Hurricane	Watch
2010	"The Sound (John M. Perkins' Blues)" (Official Version)	Tom Aiello, Edd Flynn	Hello Hurricane	Watch
2011	"Dark Horses"	Tom Aiello	Vice Verses	Watch
2011	"Restless"	Tom Aiello	Vice Verses	Watch
2012	"Rise Above It"	Tom Aiello	Vice Verses	Watch
2013	"The Original"	Bryant Jansen	Vice Verses	Watch
2013	"Who We Are"		Fading West	Watch
2013	"Love Alone Is Worth the Fight"	Matt Katsolis	Fading West	Watch
2014	"When We Come Alive"	Derec Dunn	Fading West	Watch
2016	"Float"	Enzo Marcos	Where the Light Shines Through	Watch
2017	"If the House Burns Down Tonight" (Live Version)		Where the Light Shines Through	Watch
2018	"Live It Well"	Chris Hershman	Where the Light Shines Through	Watch
2018	"You Found Me"	Kyle Lollis	Unbroken: Path to Redemption	Watch
2018	"Native Tongue"	Brad Davis	Native Tongue	Watch
2018	"Voices"	Brad Davis	Native Tongue	Watch
2018	"All I Need"	Brad Davis	Native Tongue	Watch
2018	"Let It Happen"	Paul Kerby	Native Tongue	Watch
2020	"Swim Good"	Russell Brownley	Covers	Watch
2021	"I Need You (To Be Wrong)"	Erik Frost	Interrobang	Watch
2021	"Fluorescent"	Erik Frost	Interrobang	Watch
2021	"The Bones of Us"	Erik Frost	Interrobang	Watch
2021	"If I Were You"	Erik Frost	Interrobang	Watch
2021	"Lost Cause"	Erik Frost	Interrobang	Watch
2022	"Beloved"	Erik Frost	Interrobang	Watch
2026	"Wake Up, Mr. Crow"	Erik Frost	Forever Now	Watch
2026	"Absolution"	Erik Frost	Forever Now	Watch
2026	"Beautiful Life"	Erik Frost	Forever Now	Watch

== Original compilation appearances ==
Year	Album	Song(s)	Label(s)
1998	Happy Christmas	"Evergreen"	BEC Records
1999	Listen: Louder	"Spirit"	Sparrow Records
2002	A Walk to Remember (soundtrack)	"I Dare You to Move" "Someday We'll Know" (Jon Foreman & Mandy Moore) "Learning to Breathe" "You" "Only Hope"	Sparrow Records
2003	Mixdown	"New way to Be Human" (remix)	Forefront Records
2004	Full Circle (Charlie Peacock)	"Insult Like the Truth"	Sparrow Records
2004	Kevin & Bean's Christmastime in the 909	"Old Borego"	KROQ 106.7
2005	Elektra: The Album	"Sooner or Later" (re-recorded)	Wind-up Records
2005	Happy Christmas Vol. 4	"Evergreen"	Tooth & Nail Records
2006	Nickelodeon Kid's Choice, Vol. 2	"Stars"	Viacom International
2006	Smash-Ups	"Switchfoot "You Already Take Me There" vs. Grits "TN Bwoys""	Sparrow Records
2007	San Diego Fire Relief CD	"Rebuild"	Sounden Recordings
2008	Class of '08: Dare You to Move	"Dare You to Move"	Star Song Music
2008	The Chronicles of Narnia: Prince Caspian (soundtrack)	"This Is Home"	Disney Records
2009	Disney Box Office Hits	"This Is Home"	Disney Records
2009	So Much to Save	"Dirty Second Hands"	Dave Matthews Band/So Much to Save
2011	Hawaii Five-0: Original Songs from the Television Series	"Out of Control"	CBS

== B-sides ==
Year	A-side	Song(s)	Label(s)
2003	The Beautiful Letdown	"Monday Comes Around" "Meant to Live" (Acoustic Version) "Dare You to Move" (Alternative Radio Mix)	Columbia/Sony BMG
2003	"Meant to Live" (single)	"Monday Comes Around" "On Fire [Live]" "The Beautiful Letdown [Live]"; Meant to Live [Multimedia Track]	Columbia/Sony BMG
2004	"Dare You to Move" (single)	"Monday Comes Around" "Meant to Live (Live)" "On Fire [Live]" "Gone [Live]"	Columbia/Sony BMG
2005	"Stars" (single)	"Stars (Acoustic)" "Dare You to Move (Acoustic)"	Columbia/Sony BMG
2005	Nothing Is Sound	"Goodnight Punk" "Old Borego" "Stars (Acoustic)" "Dare You to Move" (Alternative Version) "Daylight to Break"	Columbia/Sony BMG
2006	"Oh! Gravity." (single)	"Oh! Gravity. Album Preview"	Columbia/Sony BMG
2006	Oh! Gravity.	"American Dream" (acoustic) "Awakening" (Rhapsody Original version) " Burn Out Bright" (Acoustic Version) "C'mon C'mon" (acoustic) "C'mon C'mon" (remix) "Dirty Second Hands" (Live Bootleg From Tulsa, OK) "Revenge" "The Shadow Proves the Sunshine" (Alternate Version)	Columbia/Sony BMG
2008	The Best Yet	"We Are Bound"	Columbia/Sony Music
2009	Hello Hurricane	"Stitches" "Mess of Me" (Acoustic Version) "Always" (Alternate Acoustic Version) "Lucky Man" (The Verve Cover) "The Sound (John M. Perkins' Blues)" (Acoustic Version)	lowercase people records/Atlantic Records

== Covers ==
Switchfoot/Jon Foreman have performed several covers live, and in studio. For official purposes, only published covers have been posted below.

- Respect by Aretha Franklin (around 2003)
- God Only Knows by The Beach Boys (2005)
- Crazy in Love by Beyoncé (2006-2007)
- I Won't Back Down by Tom Petty (2008-2009)
- Lucky Man by The Verve (2010)
- Sabotage by Beastie Boys (2010)
- Sorrow by Bad Religion (2010)
- Wouldn't It Be Nice by The Beach Boys (2015)
- Livin' on a Prayer by Bon Jovi (2019)
