= The Best Yet =

Greatest hits album by Switchfoot
- Released: November 4, 2008
- Recorded: 1996–2008
- Genre: Alternative rock, post-grunge, hard rock
- Length: 75:51
- Label: Columbia (Legacy)/Sony Music Entertainment; Credential Recordings

Switchfoot chronology
| Best of Bootlegs Vol. 1 (2008) | The Best Yet (2008) | Hello Hurricane (2009) |

Alternative Covers
- Deluxe Edition Cover

Alternative cover
- Tour Edition Cover

Professional ratings
Review scores
| Source | Rating |
|---|---|
| Allmusic | 4.5/5 stars |
| Christian Music Today | 4/5 stars |
| Jesus Freak Hideout | 4.5/5 stars |
| Melodic | 4/5 stars |
| Studio Subversion | 7/10 stars |

The Best Yet is the first "greatest hits" album from alternative rock band Switchfoot, released on November 4, 2008.

Columbia Records, the band's former record label, was the mastermind behind releasing the record, with heavy input concerning the track list coming directly from the band itself. "We want to make sure if it's got our name on it (that) it's a product we like," lead singer Jon Foreman explained. "So we're trying to steer (Columbia) in the right direction." A tentative track listing was announced August 20, 2008, but the official track listing was later announced on the band's official message boards by Switchfoot bassist Tim Foreman. Last Record in general by Switchfoot released on a major label.

In its first week, The Best Yet sold 4,500 copies, marking it #123 on the Billboard 200 overall chart.

A live DVD titled "The Best Yet: Live in Nashville" was released later.

== Track listing ==
=== CD ===
| No. | Title | Writer(s) | Original album | Length |
|---|---|---|---|---|
| 1. | "Dare You to Move" | Jon Foreman | The Beautiful Letdown | 4:09 |
| 2. | "Meant to Live" | Jon Foreman, Tim Foreman | The Beautiful Letdown | 3:19 |
| 3. | "Stars" | Jon Foreman | Nothing Is Sound | 4:21 |
| 4. | "Oh! Gravity." | Jon Foreman, Tim Foreman | Oh! Gravity. | 2:31 |
| 5. | "This Is Home" (The Radio Mix) | Jon Foreman, Andy Dodd, Adam Watts | The Chronicles of Narnia: Prince Caspian (An Original Walt Disney Records Soundtrack) | 3:51 |
| 6. | "Learning to Breathe" | Jon Foreman | Learning to Breathe | 4:35 |
| 7. | "Awakening" | Jon Foreman | Oh! Gravity. | 4:10 |
| 8. | "This Is Your Life" | Jon Foreman | The Beautiful Letdown | 4:18 |
| 9. | "On Fire" | Jon Foreman, Daniel Victor | The Beautiful Letdown | 4:42 |
| 10. | "Only Hope" | Jon Foreman | New Way to Be Human | 4:13 |
| 11. | "Dirty Second Hands" | Jon Foreman, Todd Cooper | Oh! Gravity. | 3:19 |
| 12. | "Love Is the Movement" | Jon Foreman | Learning to Breathe | 5:11 |
| 13. | "Company Car" | Jon Foreman | New Way to Be Human | 3:12 |
| 14. | "Lonely Nation" | Jon Foreman, Tim Foreman | Nothing Is Sound | 3:45 |
| 15. | "The Shadow Proves the Sunshine" | Jon Foreman | Nothing Is Sound | 5:05 |
| 16. | "Concrete Girl" | Jon Foreman | The Legend of Chin | 5:05 |
| 17. | "Twenty-Four" | Jon Foreman | The Beautiful Letdown | 4:53 |
| 18. | "The Beautiful Letdown" | Jon Foreman | The Beautiful Letdown | 5:20 |

=== Deluxe Edition Bonus DVD Videos ===
There is also a Deluxe Edition of "The Best Yet" that was released simultaneously and features music videos from throughout the band's career. It also features audio commentaries spaced throughout, with the band members talking about the songs chosen and the music videos chosen.

== Track listing ==
1. "Dare You to Move"
2. "Meant to Live"
3. "Stars"
4. "Oh! Gravity"
5. "Awakening"
6. "We Are One Tonight"
7. "The Blues"
8. "Chem 6A"
9. "Company Car"
10. "New Way to be Human"
11. "You Already Take Me There"
12. "Happy is a Yuppie Word"
13. "Meant to Live" (Original)
14. "Dare You to Move" (Alternate)

=== Tour Edition ===
This version is currently available during the band's shows. It features fewer tracks than the normal edition, but is significantly cheaper. Also, it comes in a Discbox Slider instead of a jewel case.

1. "Dare You to Move"
2. "Meant to Live"
3. "This is Your Life"
4. "Oh! Gravity"
5. "This is Home"
6. "Learning to Breathe"
7. "Stars"
8. "On Fire"
9. "Only Hope"
10. "Awakening"
11. "The Beautiful Letdown"

=== Special Edition ===
Disc One:

1. "Dare You to Move"
2. "We Are One Tonight"
3. "The Blues"
4. "Chem 6A"
5. "Meant to Live"
6. "New Way to be Human"
7. "You Already Take Me There"
8. "Happy is a Yuppie Word"
9. "Stars"
10. "Oh! Gravity"
11. "This Is Home"
12. "Learning To Breathe"

Disc Two:

1. "Awakening"
2. "This Is Your Life"
3. "On Fire"
4. "Only Hope"
5. "Dirty Second Hands"
6. "Love Is the Movement"
7. "Company Car"
8. "Lonely Nation"
9. "The Shadow Proves the Sunshine"
10. "Concrete Girl"
11. "Twenty-Four"
12. "The Beautiful Letdown"

== Charts ==
| Year | Chart | Position |
|---|---|---|
| 2008 | US Billboard 200 | #123 |
| 2008 | Billboard Comprehensive Albums | #141 |
