= The Best Yet: Live =

The Best Yet - Live

Video by Switchfoot
- Released: (United States) December 4, 2009
- Recorded: September 21, 2008; Sommet Center - Nashville, TN
- Genre: Alternative rock
- Length: 1:02:49
- Label: lowercase people records
- Producer: Switchfoot

The Best Yet - Live is a live DVD featuring the American rock band, Switchfoot. It was recorded live at the Sommet Center in Nashville, Tennessee, on September 21, 2008, during the band's co-headlined Music Builds Tour.

The title of the film appears to coincide with the band's greatest hits album of the same name. A CD with just the audio of the concert was available to members of Friends of the Foot, once the previous Friends of the Foot exclusive Best of Bootlegs Vol. 1 was out of print.

== Track listing ==
1. Stars
2. Oh! Gravity.
3. Gone
4. We Are One Tonight / Shadow Proves The Sunshine
5. This Is Home
6. This Is Your Life
7. American Dream
8. Dirty Second Hands
9. On Fire
10. Awakening
11. Meant to Live
12. Dare You to Move
