= The Early Years: 1997–2000 =

Compilation album by Switchfoot
- Released: November 2, 2004
- Recorded: 1996–2000
- Genre: Alternative rock
- Length: 118:58
- Label: Sparrow

Switchfoot chronology
Switchfoot: Live – EP (2003)	The Early Years: 1997–2000 (2004)	Nothing Is Sound (2005)

Professional ratings
Review scores
Source	Rating
AllMusic	4/5 stars
Cross Rhythms	8/10 stars
Jesus Freak Hideout	4.5/5 stars

The Early Years: 1997–2000 is a three-disc set consisting of the first three albums by alternative rock band Switchfoot. This set was released after the band's meteoric rise to mainstream popularity with the double-platinum breakthrough The Beautiful Letdown. The Early Years is seen as an introduction to Switchfoot's earlier material for fans who were introduced to the band with The Beautiful Letdown.

The three discs on this compilation were the original pressings of The Legend of Chin, New Way to Be Human, and Learning to Breathe. The original booklets and artwork are also included in the double jewel case that houses the entire collection.

The Early Years has been certified RIAA Gold, with total sales of over 500,000 copies.

== Track listing ==
=== The Legend of Chin ===
No.	Title	Writer(s)	Length
1.	"Bomb"	Jon Foreman	2:46
2.	"Chem 6A"	Jon Foreman	3:11
3.	"Underwater"	Jon Foreman, Casey Gee	3:46
4.	"Edge of My Seat"	Jon Foreman	2:47
5.	"Home"	Jon Foreman	4:03
6.	"Might Have Ben Hur"	Jon Foreman	2:38
7.	"Concrete Girl"	Jon Foreman	5:05
8.	"Life and Love and Why"	Jon Foreman	2:52
9.	"You"	Jon Foreman	4:13
10.	"Ode to Chin"	Jon Foreman	2:15
11.	"Don't Be There"	Jon Foreman	4:22

=== New Way to Be Human ===
No.	Title	Writer(s)	Length
1.	"New Way to Be Human"	Jon Foreman, Douglas Kaine McKelvey	3:36
2.	"Incomplete"	Jon Foreman, Tim Foreman	4:13
3.	"Sooner or Later (Soren's Song)"	Jon Foreman	3:58
4.	"Company Car"	Jon Foreman	3:13
5.	"Let That Be Enough"	Jon Foreman	2:38
6.	"Something More (Augustine's Confession)"	Jon Foreman, Douglas Kaine McKelvey	4:00
7.	"Only Hope"	Jon Foreman	4:13
8.	"Amy's Song"	Jon Foreman	4:30
9.	"I Turn Everything Over"	Jon Foreman	3:21
10.	"Under the Floor"	Jon Foreman	3:55

=== Learning to Breathe ===
No.	Title	Writer(s)	Length
1.	"I Dare You To Move"	Jon Foreman	4:07
2.	"Learning to Breathe"	Jon Foreman	4:35
3.	"You Already Take Me There"	Jon Foreman, Tim Foreman	2:42
4.	"Love Is the Movement"	Jon Foreman	5:10
5.	"Poparazzi"	Jon Foreman	3:20
6.	"Innocence Again"	Jon Foreman, Tim Foreman	3:28
7.	"Playing for Keeps"	Jon Foreman	3:44
8.	"The Loser"	Jon Foreman	3:43
9.	"The Economy of Mercy"	Jon Foreman	3:56
10.	"Erosion"	Jon Foreman	3:22
11.	"Living Is Simple"	Jon Foreman	5:17
