= Best of Bootlegs Vol. 1 =

Live album by Switchfoot
- Released: March 31, 2008
- Recorded: 2007
- Genre: Alternative rock
- Length: 1:00:44
- Label: Lowercase People Records
- Producer: Switchfoot; Philemon Thomas

Switchfoot chronology
| Oh! Gravity. (2006) | Best of Bootlegs Vol. 1 (2008) | The Best Yet (2008) |

Best of Bootlegs Vol. 1 is a live compilation CD from the alternative rock band Switchfoot. The tracks were taken from the various “official bootleg” recordings that were distributed at each show from the band’s 2007 fall Appetite for Construction Tour.

The album was released at the launch of the band’s official fan club, “Friends of the Foot”, as an exclusive autographed CD. The band has stated that these tracks will be made available to everyone in the near future.

== Track listing ==
1. "Oh! Gravity. (with Intro) Everett, WA 12.03.07 - 4:43
2. "On Fire / High and Dry (feat. Keith Tutt) Irvine, CA 11.27.07 - 7:31
3. "Dirty Second Hands University Park, PA 11.15.07 - 6:45
4. "Gone (Crazy) San Jose, CA 11.29.07 - 6:09
5. "Awakening NYC, New York 11.17.07 - 4:59
6. "Meant to Live NYC, New York 11.17.07 - 6:50
7. "Only Hope (acoustic) Ypsilanti, MI 11.12.07 - 3:32
8. "Sweet Home Alabama (interlude) Mobile, AL 10.28.07 - 1:13
9. "We Are One Tonight / Shadow (mash-up) Baltimore, MD 11.18.07 - 6:20
10. "Let Your Love Be Strong (feat. Keith Tutt) Baltimore, MD 11.18.07 - 5:05
11. "Dare You to Move Salem, OR 12.02.07 - 7:42
