= Switchfoot: Live – EP =

Switchfoot: Live - EP

EP by Switchfoot
- Released: (United States) March 9, 2004
- Recorded: 2003
- Genre: Alternative rock
- Length: 22:48
- Label: Columbia/Sony BMG

Switchfoot chronology
The Beautiful Letdown (2003)	Switchfoot: Live - EP (2004)	The Early Years: 1997–2000 (2004)

Switchfoot: Live – EP is a live EP from San Diego rock band Switchfoot. It was released on the online music services iTunes and Rhapsody and features songs recorded live at Soma in San Diego. Additionally, these songs, along with the rest of the setlist at the show, were released on the DVD, Live in San Diego. An alternative version of this EP featuring the track "Ammunition" was available on iTunes for several months, although it was deleted shortly after the official version was added.

== Track listing ==
Official version
No.	Title	Writer(s)	Length
1.	"Dare You to Move"	Jon Foreman	5:56
2.	"On Fire"	Jon Foreman, Daniel Victor	5:00
3.	"The Beautiful Letdown"	Jon Foreman	6:16
4.	"More Than Fine"	Jon Foreman	5:36
Total length:			22:48

Alternative version
No.	Title	Writer(s)	Length
1.	"Dare You to Move"	Jon Foreman	5:56
2.	"On Fire"	Jon Foreman, Daniel Victor	5:00
3.	"Ammunition"	Jon Foreman	4:31
Total length:			15:27
