= Prince Caspian (disambiguation) =

Prince Caspian is a 1951 children's novel by C. S. Lewis.

Prince Caspian can also refer to:

- Prince Caspian (character), the title character of Lewis' book, and a major character in his Narnia series
- Prince Caspian, a 1989 BBC television programme based on the novel
- The Chronicles of Narnia: Prince Caspian, a 2008 film based on the novel
- The Chronicles of Narnia: Prince Caspian (soundtrack), the soundtrack of the 2008 film by the same name
- The Chronicles of Narnia: Prince Caspian (video game), a video game based on the film
- Prince Caspian, a song by American band, Phish, from their album, Billy Breathes
