= Eastern Hymns for Western Shores =

EP by Switchfoot
- Released: December 7, 2010
- Recorded: 2005–2006
- Genre: Alternative rock; hard rock; post-grunge
- Length: 19:21
- Label: lowercase people records

Switchfoot chronology
Hello Hurricane (2009)	Eastern Hymns for Western Shores (2010)	Vice Verses (2011)

Eastern Hymns for Western Shores is an EP of previously unreleased Switchfoot songs. It was first available for purchase on the band's annual Holiday Package for 2010. The EP was released for individual purchase from Switchfoot.com on December 31, 2010.

== History ==
Word of a possible lost EP of Switchfoot songs began circulating when fan websites received word from "inside sources" of a release called "Eastern Hymns for Western Shores". No word came after that for almost an entire year, until drummer Chad Butler was asked about the release in January 2010. Butler admitted to being unclear of plans for the tunes, saying "I'm sure that'll come out maybe sometime this year. We'll see."

This was the last anyone heard of Eastern Hymns for Western Shores until the official announcement was sent out via email newsletter. In the email, Switchfoot revealed that the songs were recorded between the Nothing Is Sound and Oh! Gravity. sessions. The masters for these songs were thought to have been lost or stolen for years until they were finally recovered, recorded and mixed within the same week. The band went on to describe that the six songs showcase a "darker and more mysterious sound for the band", and that they had gone "all out" on the packaging.

== Track listing ==
No.	Title	Length
1.	"We Are Bound"	3:29
2.	"Stitches"	3:08
3.	"Daylight to Break"	3:35
4.	"Overthrow"	3:36
5.	"Dirty Second Hands" (Original Version - Eastern Hymns Sessions)	2:50
6.	"Connect with the Spine"	2:44
Total length:		19:22
