= Live in San Diego (film) =

Video by Switchfoot
- Released: March 23, 2004
- Genres: Alternative rock, hard rock
- Length: 53:26
- Label: Sparrow/Columbia

Professional ratings
Review scores
Source	Rating
Cross Rhythms	8/10 stars
Jesus Freak Hideout	3.5/5 stars
Relevant Magazine	(negative)

Live in San Diego is a DVD of a concert by the band Switchfoot. It was released in 2004, between the band's albums The Beautiful Letdown and Nothing Is Sound. With the exception of "Learning to Breathe", all of the songs performed at this concert were from their 2003 double-platinum selling album The Beautiful Letdown. The concert was played at SOMA, in San Diego, California. The DVD was certified platinum by the RIAA, selling over 100,000 copies.

== Song listing ==
1. This Is Your Life
2. Ammunition
3. Gone
4. Learning to Breathe
5. More Than Fine
6. Adding to the Noise
7. Twenty Four
8. On Fire
9. The Beautiful Letdown
10. Meant to Live
11. Dare You to Move

== DVD video extras ==
- Interviews
- "Meant to Live" Video
- "Making of the "Meant to Live" Video
- Photo Gallery

== Awards ==
In 2005, the album won a Dove Award for Long Form Music Video of the Year at the 36th GMA Dove Awards.
