= This Is Home =

"This is Home"

Single by Switchfoot

from the album The Chronicles of Narnia: Prince Caspian (An Original Walt Disney Records Soundtrack) and The Best Yet
- Released: April 25, 2008 (to radio); October 21, 2008 (radio re-ship)
- Recorded: 2008
- Genre: Alternative rock
- Length: 3:53 (radio edit/soundtrack version); 4:01 (Music Video)
- Label: Walt Disney Records
- Songwriters: Jon Foreman; Adam Watts; Andy Dodd
- Producers: Switchfoot; Adam Watts; Andy Dodd

Switchfoot singles chronology
"Head over Heels (In This Life)" (2007)	"This is Home" (2008)	"Mess of Me" (2009)

"This is Home" is a song written and recorded by American rock band Switchfoot for the soundtrack of the 2008 film The Chronicles of Narnia: Prince Caspian. The song was featured during the end credits of the film. It was the 17th-most-played song on U.S. Contemporary Christian music radio stations for 2008 according to R&R magazine's Christian CHR chart.

== Song history ==
Jon Foreman posted in a March 17, 2008, MySpace blog that "I’m a big fan of CS Lewis so a movie made by the mouse, (Mickey) for the lion (Aslan) seemed like a good idea. So I’m up here (near Disneyland incidentally), tracking a song that may or may not be used for the next Narnia movie."

On a March 22, 2008, blog, Foreman announced that the song's name would be "This Is Home". It was confirmed on April 2, 2008, by the Narnia Insider.

The song was performed for the first time live at University of Iowa's Iowa Memorial Union on Wednesday night, April 16, 2008.

Foreman said, "I'm a huge C.S. Lewis fan and one of the big reasons I love his writing is because there's a longing in every page of his fiction and non-fiction... He doesn't create worlds that are picture perfect, but they feel real, they feel like they could exist, and that's because it feels like this world here where we're all longing for things to be set right."

"'This Is Home' was inspired by the book after re-reading it for the opportunity to write for the film. I am always taken by [C. S.] Lewis' ability to write about the bittersweet beauty in this world; this home we aren’t really made for but is the place we work out our humanity in the midst of our longing for our true home."

The song was also featured on ESPN SportsCenter's "Titletown" segment which ran throughout July 2008.

The song's lyrics and message interpretation were specifically singled out by friends and mourners during the funeral of Christina Grimmie, as Switchfoot was Grimmie's favourite band, and C.S. Lewis was one of her favorite authors. Grimmie had originally intended to perform the song when competing on season 6 of The Voice and had wanted to dedicate the song to her friends and family.

== Versions ==
There are five different versions/mixes of the song.

- The Radio Mix was the first version of the song that emerged on websites like allaccess.com and interlinc-online.com and features a full drum kit arrangement and a full-band performance. It is the mix that was shipped to and played on radio stations, likely for its more upbeat tempo. This is the version featured in the official music videos and on The Best Yet.
- The Soundtrack version is the one found on the actual soundtrack cd for the movie, and features light percussion in place of the full drum set, along with a more atmospheric feel in the overall sound mix.
- The Credits version is drastically different from the other two versions. Featured in the end credits of the actual movie that was shown in theaters and on the DVD, it features altered lyrics, and shorter length. Copies of this version first emerged online as a result of pre-release rips of the "Prince Caspian" DVD. This "credits version" was chosen over the others because "the director liked our demo version of the song the best and actually put that part of the demo version in the actual film," according to guitarist Drew Shirley.
- An acoustic cut of the song that was released as a single that was exclusive to the Rhapsody music store/service.
- In August, 2009, The band also made available one of their earlier demo cuts of the song, at the time titled "Heading Home," exclusively to the Friends of the Foot fan club.

== Release as a radio single ==
The single impacted to radio on April 25, 2008.

Partnering with Walt Disney Records and in addition to local marketing surrounding the film, the band's Christian-side distributor, Sparrow Records under EMI CMG Label Group released "This Is Home" to AC and CHR Christian radio. The band's management team, Red Light Management/Entertainment, partnering with the Disney-owned Hollywood Records put the single out at mainstream AC and Triple A radio formats.

In November, the new music video for the song was released by Sony, and the song was reshipped to radio, with little success.

=== Chart positions ===
Chart	Peak position
Hot AC	63
CHR	3
Christian Rock Airplay	21
Billboard Hot Christian Songs	14
Billboard Hot Christian Adult Contemporary	21
Billboard Hot Christian Songs	4

== Awards ==
The song was nominated for a Dove Award for Pop/Contemporary Recorded Song of the Year at the 40th GMA Dove Awards.

== Music videos ==
=== Version 1 (Prince Caspian) ===
The band shot a music video for the song, interspersed with footage from the actual movie on Sunday, April 13, 2008.

The video premiered May 2, 2008, on Disney.com, and was posted on the band's official website as streaming YouTube video three days later. The video is included in the enhanced portion of the soundtrack carried in certain stores.

=== Version 2 ===
The band shot another music video, and it was released on YouTube November 19, 2008. It featured an introductory speech about the song by Foreman at the beginning, and features live footage from a concert the band played. Sony owns the copyright to the video, so it is assumed the video was shot for promotion of "The Best Yet" compilation.

== Other appearances ==
- The song also appears on Switchfoot's The Best Yet greatest hits compilation.
- The song appeared on Walt Disney Records' compilation, Disney Box Office Hits.
- The song was also by appearances by the compilation album WOW Hits 2009.
- The song appeared in the Michigan Stadium Re-Dedication video
- An edited form of the "Radio mix" was used in trailers for the Disney film "Chimpanzee"
