= The Legend of Chin =

Studio album by Switchfoot
- Released: June 17, 1997
- Recorded: Signature Sound, San Diego, California
- Genre: Alternative rock
- Length: 37:53
- Label: re:think
- Producer: Jimmie Lee Sloas

Switchfoot chronology
The Legend of Chin (1997)	New Way to Be Human (1999)

Singles from The Legend Of Chin
- 1. "Chem 6A" Released: 1997

The Legend of Chin is the debut studio album by the American alternative rock band Switchfoot. It was released on June 17, 1997 under independent label re:think Records, which was distributed by Sparrow Records.

The album is titled after Jon Foreman's high school best friend, Willis Chin, whose photos and birth date are printed on the album booklet.

== Promotion and subsequent releases ==
An official music video was released for the song "Chem 6A". In 2009, it was published on the official YouTube channel of EMI. As of October 28, 2016, it has had over 130,000 views.

In 2004, Switchfoot released a 3-CD compilation entitled The Early Years: 1997-2000, which encompassed their first three albums, including The Legend of Chin. In 2008, "Concrete Girl" was included on the band's greatest hits collection, The Best Yet, and "Chem 6A" was included in the Deluxe Edition Bonus DVD of The Best Yet.

== Impact ==
While the album never officially charted on Billboard, tracks from Legend of Chin were revitalized on subsequent Switchfoot projects. Most notably, the song "You" was featured on the soundtrack of 2002 movie A Walk to Remember, starring Mandy Moore and Shane West.

== Critical reception ==
Professional ratings
Review scores
Source	Rating
AllMusic	2.5/5 stars
Jesus Freak Hideout	4/5 stars
Cross Rhythms	7/10 stars

The album got a positive review from Billboard, which called it "An intriguing and surprisingly mature effort for a debut release."

Mike Rimmer of Cross Rhythms rated the album 7/10 and wrote, "They may have taken their name from a surfer buzzword but this ain't no Beach Boys album. Instead, a melodic modern rock style reveals some nifty crisp guitar sounds, raspy vocals and a smattering of memorable songs and there's the problem. So much of this still washes over me and despite the fact I've played it about 15 times, it's still barely getting my attention. (...) Sonically this sounds like a great album – all the right ingredients are in place, but like a good Yorkshire pudding, even the finest ingredients won't be enough if it doesn't completely rise! There are moments when this one is more pancake than pudding. However, overall worth checking out."

== Track listing ==
All tracks are written by Jon Foreman, except where noted. Tracks 2, 3, 5, and 10 were released as the 4 singles from the album.

No.	Title	Writer(s)	Length
1.	"Bomb"		2:46
2.	"Chem 6A"		3:11
3.	"Underwater"	Jon Foreman, Casey Gee	3:46
4.	"Edge of My Seat"		2:47
5.	"Home"		4:03
6.	"Might Have Ben Hur"		2:38
7.	"Concrete Girl"		5:05
8.	"Life and Love and Why"		2:52
9.	"You"		4:13
10.	"Ode to Chin"		2:15
11.	"Don't Be There"		4:22

== Personnel ==
Switchfoot

- Jon Foreman – guitar, vocals
- Tim Foreman – bass, backing vocals
- Chad Butler – drums, percussion

Additional musicians

- David Davidson – strings
- Peter Hyrka – strings
- Kristin Wilkinson – strings
- Matt Slocum – strings
- Eric Darken – percussion
- Jimmie Lee Sloas – guitar
- Charlie Peacock – rhodes, trumpet
- Lucas Eddens – scratching; turntables
