= Learning to Breathe (Switchfoot album) =

Studio album by Switchfoot
- Released: September 26, 2000
- Recorded: Charlie Peacock Productions
- Genre: Alternative rock, post-grunge
- Length: 43:28
- Label: re:think
- Producer: Charlie Peacock; Jacquire King; Switchfoot

Switchfoot chronology
New Way to Be Human (1999)	Learning to Breathe (2000)	The Beautiful Letdown (2003)

Professional ratings
Review scores
Source	Rating
AllMusic	3/5 stars
Cross Rhythms	10/10 stars
Jesus Freak Hideout	4/5 stars
HM	
Melodic	3/5 stars

Learning to Breathe is the third studio album by the band Switchfoot. It was released on September 26, 2000. It was their final record for independent label re:think Records, which was distributed by Sparrow Records. This album also received a Grammy nomination for Best Rock Gospel Album in 2001.

== Promotion ==
A music video was filmed for the song "You Already Take Me There". It shows the band skydiving out of an airplane, and playing the song on the ground.

== Track listing ==
All tracks are written by Jon Foreman, except where noted.

No.	Title	Writer(s)	Length
1.	"I Dare You to Move"		4:08
2.	"Learning to Breathe"		4:35
3.	"You Already Take Me There"	Jon Foreman, Tim Foreman	2:42
4.	"Love Is the Movement"		5:10
5.	"Poparazzi"		3:20
6.	"Innocence Again"	Jon Foreman, Tim Foreman	3:28
7.	"Playing for Keeps"		3:44
8.	"The Loser"		3:43
9.	"The Economy of Mercy"		3:56
10.	"Erosion"		3:22
11.	"Living Is Simple"		5:19

== Personnel ==
Switchfoot

- Jon Foreman – lead vocals, guitar, keyboards
- Tim Foreman – bass, backing vocals, keyboards
- Chad Butler – drums, percussion

Additional musicians

- Vicky Hampton – additional backing vocals (track 4)
- Darwin Hobbs – additional backing vocals (track 4)
- Jan Foreman – additional vocals (track 11)

Technical personnel

- Charlie Peacock – production (tracks 1–2, 4–5 and 9)
- Jacquire King – production (tracks 3, 6–8, 10), recording (tracks 3, 6–8, 10), mixing (tracks 2–3, 5–10)
- Switchfoot – production (track 11)
- Shane D. Wilson – recording (tracks 1–2, 4–5, 9 and 11), overdubs recording (tracks 1–2, 4–5 and 9), mixing (track 11)
- Richie Biggs – overdubs recording (tracks 1–2, 4–5 and 9)
- Jon Foreman – pre-production recordings (tracks 1–2, 4–5, 9 and 11)
- Ryan Fisher – pre-production recordings (tracks 1–2, 4–5 and 9), engineering assistance (tracks 1–2, 4–5 and 9), mixing (tracks 1 and 4)
- Tony Miracle – pre-production recordings (tracks 1–2, 4–5, 9 and 11), synths and noise (tracks 1–2, 4–5 and 9), analog synths and textures (tracks 3, 6–8, 10)
- Kip Kuban – pre-production recordings (tracks 1–2, 4–5 and 9), synths and noise (tracks 1–2, 4–5 and 9)
- Dan Leffler – mixing assistance (tracks 2–3, 5–10)
- Chris Grainger – assistance (tracks 3, 6–8, 10)
- Chris Hauser – assistance (tracks 3, 6–8, 10)
- Lynn A. Nichols – executive production
- Ken Love – mastering
