= New Way to Be Human =

- Cover art by Shepard Fairey.

Studio album by Switchfoot
- Released: March 11, 1999
- Recorded: re:think Studio
- Genre: Alternative rock, indie rock
- Length: 37:37
- Label: re:think
- Producer: Charlie Peacock

Switchfoot chronology
The Legend of Chin (1997)	New Way to Be Human (1999)	Learning to Breathe (2000)

Singles from New Way to Be Human
- 1. "New Way to Be Human" Released: 1999; 2. "Incomplete" Released: 1999; 3. "Company Car" Released: 1999

Professional ratings
Review scores
Source	Rating
Allmusic	3.5/5 stars
Cross Rhythms	8/10 stars
Jesus Freak Hideout	4/5 stars

New Way to Be Human is the second studio album by the band Switchfoot. It was released on March 11, 1999, under independent label re:think Records, which was distributed by Sparrow Records. The song "Only Hope" was featured in the movie A Walk To Remember, and the tracks "New Way to Be Human", "Something More (Augustine's Confession)", and "I Turn Everything Over" received substantial play on Christian radio. The song "Let That Be Enough" was featured in the Disney television movie Model Behavior and in the television series Dawson's Creek. "Sooner or Later" appeared on the soundtrack to Elektra.

== Book ==
A book of the same name has also been written by producer Charlie Peacock. The intro to the book is written by Jon Foreman, Switchfoot's lead singer and songwriter.

== Lyrical philosophy ==
Both "Sooner or Later (Soren's Song)" and "Something More (Augustine's Confession)" are based upon the works of philosophers.

"Something More" is based upon a series of books, known as Confessions, that were written by Augustine of Hippo.

About "Sooner or Later", Jon Foreman has said: "Sooner or later we all have to deal with the frightening reality that there is much that is wrong in the world... This is Soren's song... These are his thoughts as best as I understand them," alluding to the philosophy of Danish Christian philosopher Søren Kierkegaard. The song also references Jean-Paul Sartre's idea that men are "condemned to be free".

== Composition ==
The songs are alternative rock/jangle pop based. "New Way to Be Human" has two keys: E major and C Major. "New Way to be Human" has been remixed once.

== Track listing ==
All tracks are written by Jon Foreman, except where noted. Tracks 1, 2, and 4 were released as the album's singles.

No.	Title	Writer(s)	Length
1.	"New Way to Be Human"	Jon Foreman, Douglas Kaine McKelvey	3:36
2.	"Incomplete"	Jon Foreman, Tim Foreman	4:13
3.	"Sooner or Later (Soren's Song)"		3:58
4.	"Company Car"		3:13
5.	"Let That Be Enough"		2:38
6.	"Something More (Augustine's Confession)"	Jon Foreman, Douglas Kaine McKelvey	4:00
7.	"Only Hope"		4:13
8.	"Amy's Song"		4:30
9.	"I Turn Everything Over"		3:21
10.	"Under the Floor" (The song "Under the Floor" ends at minute 3:07. After 15 seconds of silence, at minute 3:22 an untitled, hidden song that is a brief radio jingle begins.)		3:55
Total length:			37:37

== Personnel ==
Switchfoot

- Jon Foreman - vocals, guitar, piano, trumpet
- Chad Butler - drums, percussion
- Tim Foreman - bass, backing vocals

Additional musicians

- Tony Miracle - analog synth
- David Davidson - violin
- Bob Mason - cello
- Sam Levine - bass clarinet, flute
- Mike Haynes - trumpet
- Mark Douthit - tenor sax
- Charlie Peacock - orchestration
