= Switchfoot =

American alternative rock band

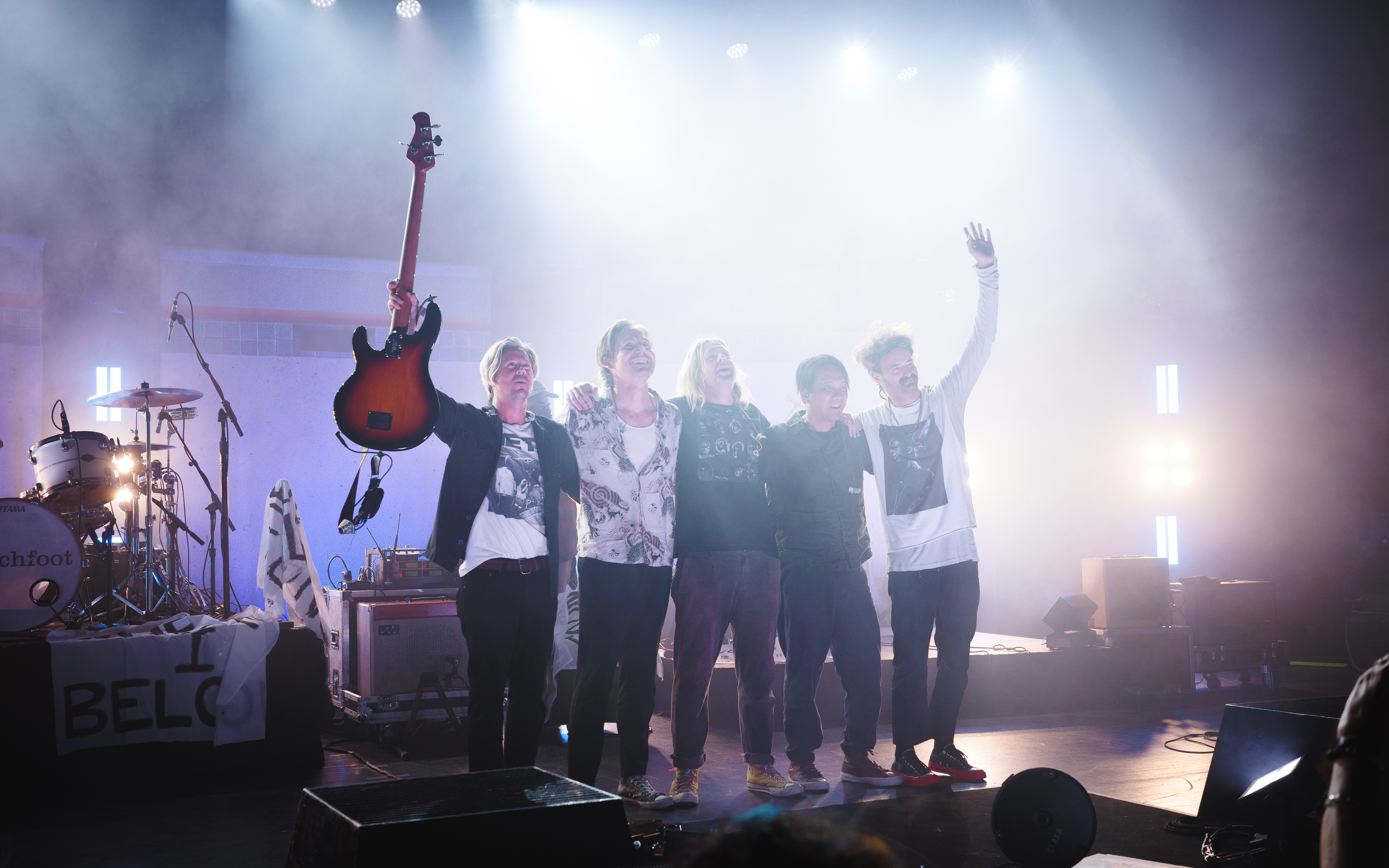
- Switchfoot at The National in 2023

Background information
- Also known as: Chin Up (1996–1997)
- Origin: San Diego, California, U.S.
- Genres: Alternative rock; art rock; post-grunge; indie rock; gospel; power pop; pop rock; post-punk; punk rock
- Works: Switchfoot discography
- Years active: 1996–present
- Labels: Rethink; Columbia; Sony BMG; Lowercase People; Atlantic; Fantasy; Vanguard; Sparrow; By Design
- Members: Jon Foreman; Tim Foreman; Chad Butler; Jerome Fontamillas; Boaz Roberts
- Past members: Drew Shirley
- Website: switchfoot.com

Switchfoot is an American rock band from San Diego, California. The band was founded by brothers Jon (lead vocals, guitar, piano) and Tim Foreman (bass guitar, backing vocals), alongside Chad Butler (drums, percussion), in 1996. They have been joined by Jerome Fontamillas (guitar, keyboards, backing vocals) since 2001, and by Boaz Roberts (guitar, backing vocals) since 2026. Drew Shirley (guitar) was a member of the band from 2005 to 2022.

After early success in the Christian rock scene, Switchfoot gained mainstream recognition with the inclusion of four of their songs in the 2002 film A Walk to Remember. This led to the release of their major label debut The Beautiful Letdown, which was released in 2003 and featured the hit singles "Meant to Live" and "Dare You to Move". Commercial success continued for the band throughout the 2000s; their fifth album, Nothing Is Sound (2005) peaked at number three on the Billboard 200, while their seventh album Hello Hurricane (2009) received a Grammy Award for Best Rock or Rap Gospel Album. The band has released 13 mainline studio albums to date; the most recent, Forever Now, was released in 2026. They have also been noted for their energetic live shows, which have been described as "energetic, loud, and passionate".

According to Jon Foreman, the name Switchfoot comes from a surfing term. "We all love to surf and have been surfing all our lives so to us, the name made sense. To switch your feet means to take a new stance facing the opposite direction. It's about change and movement, a different way of approaching life and music."

== History ==
=== Formation and early years (1996–2002) ===
Switchfoot was founded in 1996, originally under the moniker of Chin Up. They began performing locally, including at the North Coast Calvary Chapel in Carlsbad, California, as owned by the Foreman brothers' father Mark Foreman. Within a year of forming, the band was contacted by music industry veteran Charlie Peacock and eventually signed to his indie label Re:think Records; by this point, the band had changed their name to Switchfoot. Re:think went on to distribute the first three Switchfoot albums: The Legend of Chin (1997), New Way to Be Human (1999), and Learning to Breathe (2000). Because Re:think was bought by Christian label Sparrow Records before Switchfoot's first release, the band's and Peacock's intentions of being marketed outside of the contemporary Christian music scene and reaching a wider audience were put on hold. Consequently, the band was mostly marketed to Christian radio and retail outlets early in their careers, a time Jon Foreman has described as when "half of who we were was lost." Of Switchfoot's first three albums, Learning to Breathe was the most successful, receiving a Grammy nomination for Best Rock Gospel Album.

Later in 2002, Switchfoot's music was featured prominently in the movie A Walk to Remember, starring singer and actress Mandy Moore, who sang Switchfoot's song "Only Hope" during a scene in the movie. In addition to Moore's cover of "Only Hope", Switchfoot's songs "You", "Learning to Breathe", and "I Dare You to Move" were showcased in the film, as well as their own original version of "Only Hope" towards the end of the film.

=== The Beautiful Letdown (2003–2005) ===
After the exposure which came from A Walk to Remember, Switchfoot attracted attention from multiple record labels and eventually they signed with Columbia Records/Sony BMG. Their major label debut, The Beautiful Letdown, under Columbia Records/Red Ink, represented the band's evolution from the predominantly lo-fi, indie rock sound of their early albums, toward a more layered, synth-influenced sound that helped launch the band to mainstream popularity. The shift sonically could be attributed to the fact that the album was the first to include keyboardist Jerome Fontamillas, formerly of industrial bands Mortal and Fold Zandura. Fontamillas had been touring with Switchfoot since 2000, following the release of Learning to Breathe.

The Beautiful Letdown has since been certified triple platinum, selling more than 3 million copies behind constant touring and the huge mainstream radio hits "Meant to Live" and "Dare You to Move". A live DVD depicting one of the band's live concerts, Live in San Diego, went platinum as well and a third single, "This Is Your Life" was released to radio. In addition, the song "Gone" received major airplay on Christian radio stations as well.

After the runaway success of The Beautiful Letdown, a compilation titled The Early Years: 1997-2000 was released, which featured Switchfoot's first three indie albums released under Re:think records including the original artwork for all the albums. The collection has since been certified gold with total sales of over 500,000 copies.

Switchfoot also received five 2005 Dove Award nominations, and won four, including Artist of the year.

=== Nothing Is Sound (2005–2006) ===
In 2005, prior to the release of Nothing Is Sound, Switchfoot announced that guitarist Drew Shirley (previously the guitarist for All Together Separate) had joined as the band's fifth member after touring with the band since 2003. Nothing Is Sound was released on September 13, 2005; with Shirley's inclusion Switchfoot's sound became even more densely layered and guitar-heavy, resulting in an album which was edgier and darker than any of their previous work. "Stars" was released as the first radio single to promote the album, and was a solid hit on mainstream and alternative rock radio stations. It was used in ads for HBO. "We Are One Tonight" was released as the second single in early 2006; it was also featured in ads for the 2006 Winter Olympics in Turin, Italy.

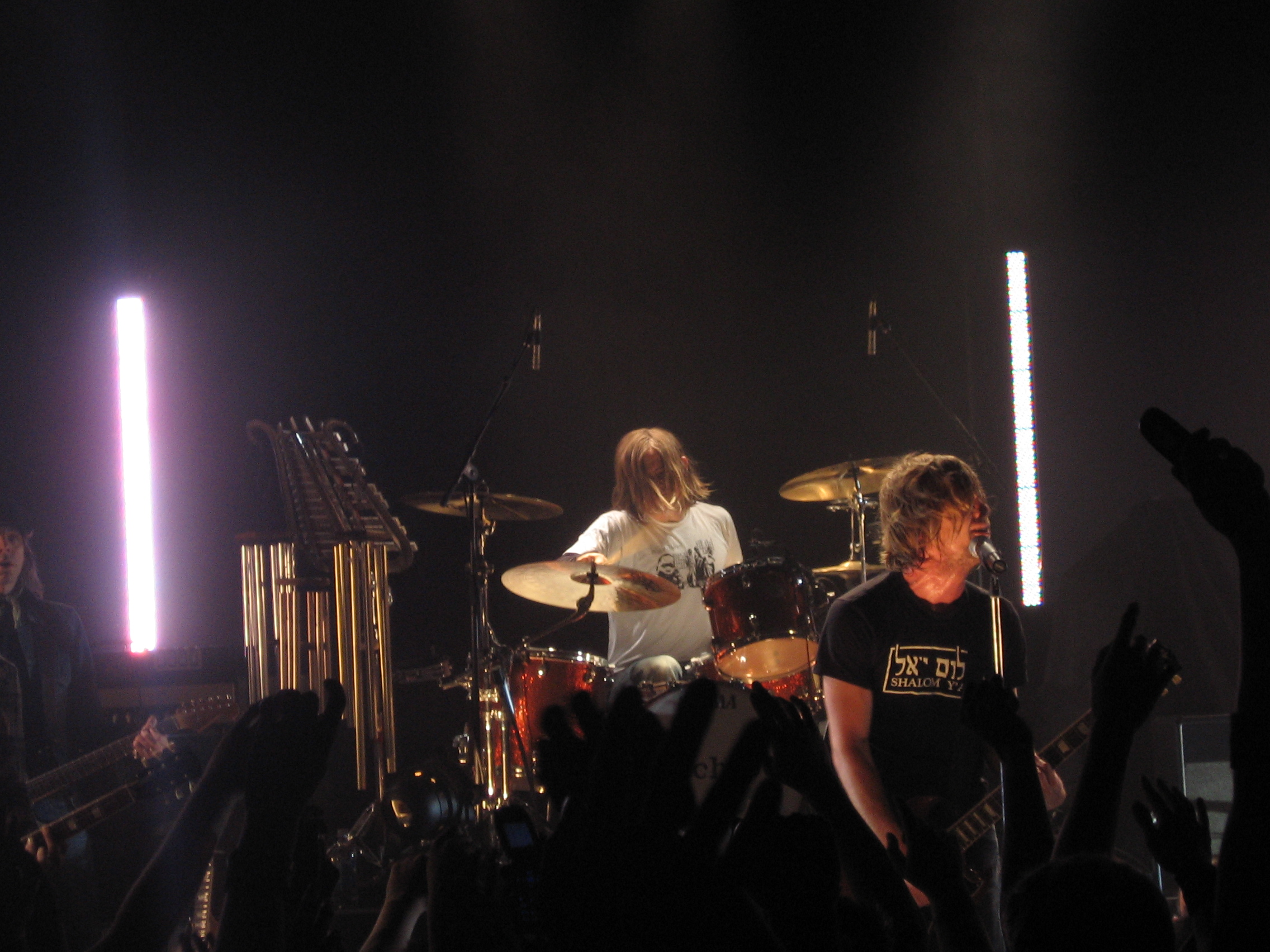
Nothing is Sound Tour in Vancouver, BC

The album debuted at No. 3 on the Billboard 200 albums chart, an all-time high for the band, while bassist Tim Foreman attracted headlines by speaking out against the copy-protection used by the label and providing fans with a detailed workaround on the band's message board, which was quickly deleted by Sony. The copy-protection is known as Extended Copy Protection, which has been identified by leading anti-virus companies as being a trojan horse and a rootkit.

During the spring 2006 leg of the Nothing Is Sound Tour, the band introduced "a video diary of life on the road" in the form of free video podcasts available via iTunes and streaming online on YouTube. In addition to featuring snippets of upcoming songs and live performances, the videos gave fans an inside look at the more casual and humorous aspects of the band members' touring lives; it features footage of the band working on their follow-up to Nothing Is Sound.

=== Oh! Gravity. (2006–2007) ===
Switchfoot's next album, Oh! Gravity., was released on December 26, 2006, to considerable critical acclaim. It entered the Billboard chart at No. 18 and peaked at No. 1 on iTunes' Top Albums chart.

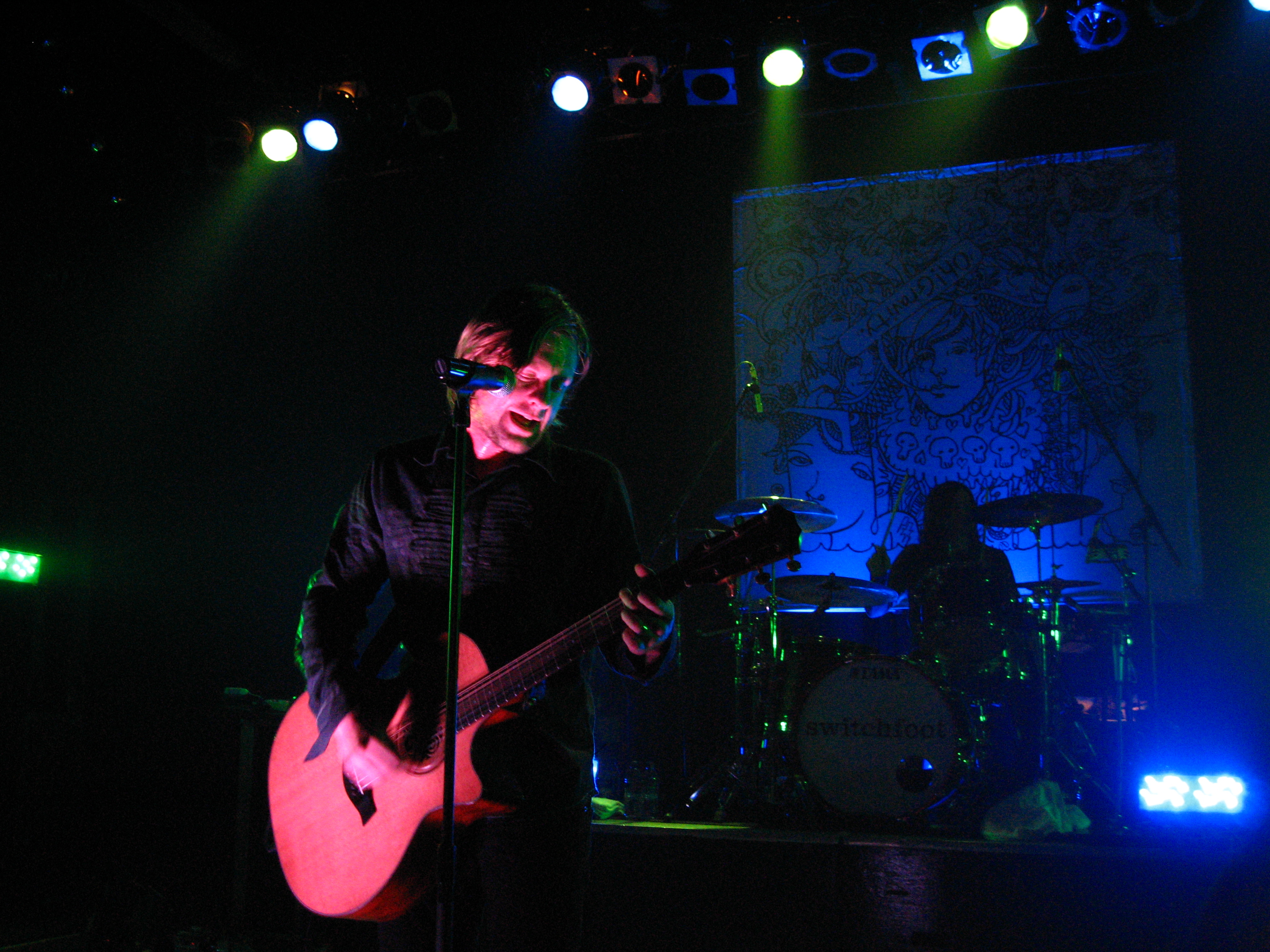
Oh! Gravity Spring Tour 2007 in Charleston, South Carolina

Before the release of the album, Switchfoot e-mailed a newsletter on June 2 which contained a free download of the song "Daylight to Break", a statement from Foreman implying that the band wanted to have a new album out by the end of the year, as well as a thanks to their fans for helping keep the band together for ten years. The band tried to involve their fans in the creation of the album, setting up a webcam in their recording studio and running a contest for a chance to play the cowbell in the studio with the band.

Promoting the album, the band first released the song, "Dirty Second Hands", as a "preview" single via iTunes on September 26. The title track, "Oh! Gravity.", was also released to iTunes on October 21 and was sent to radio on October 31 as the lead single for the album, seeing limited success at alternative and modern rock radio. The album's second single, "Awakening", was released in early 2007. Although it had virtually no play on mainstream radio, the accompanying band-funded music video song received over one million hits on YouTube in less than three months. When Oh! Gravity was pre-ordered, a three-song EP called Oh! Switchfoot was included. The short CD included three songs: "The Sound in My Mouth", "C'mon C'mon", and "Oh! Gravity (Acoustic)".

=== Major-label independence, The Best Yet (2007–2008) ===
Later on August 10, 2007, Jon Foreman revealed that the band had severed ties with Columbia Records in order to release music as an indie band. “Neither party has any hard feelings,” he said of the split a few months later. “I think for us, the reason why we signed with Columbia was because of the people that were there. So it’s very understandable when all those people are gone, you don’t hold any real bad feelings or good feelings towards a company name. I think that’s part of the problem with the corporate entity as a whole is that there’s no true responsibility.” In October 2007, the band announced that they had created a new record label called lowercase people records, in order to better make a direct connection with their fans.

Jon Foreman began working on his own set of solo EPs (one named after each season of the year); the first of these was released on November 27, 2007, the last on June 10, 2008. “Your Love Is Strong” is the most well known from the string of releases. Each of his EPs contained six songs. At the end of the process, he released a sort of “best of” album called Limbs and Branches. Foreman wrote two additional songs for this called “Over the River” and “Broken from the Start”. Once all four EPs were released, they were re-released on vinyl in limited quantity. Foreman also began a side project with Sean Watkins of Nickel Creek which was originally called The Real SeanJon but later renamed Fiction Family.

With their new status as an independent band, Switchfoot embarked on their 2007 fall tour, playing shows with Relient K and Ruth. The tour, dubbed the “Appetite for Construction Tour“, was designed to benefit Habitat For Humanity with the bands donating one dollar per ticket sold to the cause. In addition, Foreman wrote the song “Rebuild“ with Matt Thiessen from Relient K, and released it as a way to raise additional money for Habitat. By the end of the tour, the bands had raised over $100,000 for Habitat for Humanity. With no new album to promote, the band continued touring for philanthropic causes, booking a short national tour in March through May (titled the Up In Arms Tour), partnering with and benefitting the organization To Write Love on Her Arms.

In March 2008, the band wrote and recorded a new song called “This Is Home“ for the film ‘’The Chronicles of Narnia: Prince Caspian‘’. The song was included on the film’s official soundtrack and an accompanying music video was also filmed, with footage from the film.

Later that year, Columbia Records/Sony Music released a Switchfoot greatest hits compilation album titled The Best Yet, a sort of “final farewell from Sony”.

=== Hello Hurricane and Eastern Hymns for Western Shores (2008–2010) ===
Prior to the label split, Foreman had announced in a March 17, 2007, MySpace blog that Switchfoot had begun pre-production for a new album; he said that “the new SF record is underway.” On October 12, 2007, Foreman also announced that the band had begun construction of their own studio in their hometown of San Diego. The studio, named Spot X Studio, was completed in the spring of 2008, and the band began recording their follow-up to 2006’s Oh! Gravity.

In April, the band announced that instead of one studio album, they had actually been at work on four albums’ worth of material, and had decided at the time to release them one after another, starting with the first one on November 10, 2009, titled Hello Hurricane.

When Hello Hurricane was completed, the band began searching for “the right partners” to distribute the songs globally. On August 7, 2009, the band announced that lowercase people records was licensing the album to Atlantic Records, ensuring “these tunes are heard around the world.” As a promotion for the new release, the band took a hands-on approach with their lead single, “Mess of Me”; they hid copies of the single all across the world and encouraged fans to share it by finding the discs and making copies of their own to hide. Through this, the single spread all across the world in grassroots fashion in advance of a traditional radio release; the track hit the Top 15 of Modern Rock radio. That was followed by the release of “The Sound (John M. Perkins' Blues)”, which went on to become the band’s first Top 10 Modern Rock hit since “Dare You to Move”.

On December 1, 2010, it was announced that Hello Hurricane had been nominated for a Grammy Award for Best Rock or Rap Gospel Album. It won the Grammy on February 13, 2011.

Late in 2010, Switchfoot announced via newsletter, that they would be releasing an EP of songs that they wrote and recorded between Nothing Is Sound and Oh! Gravity. It was called “Eastern Hymns for Western Shores”. For a time the location of the masters of these tracks were unknown. Once found, Switchfoot announced that the EP would be available as part of their holiday fan pack which also included a Switchfoot calendar, poster, sweatshirt jacket, and limited edition post cards with one for each of the songs on the EP. In their newsletter the band described these songs as showing their “darker” side. The EP included five never before heard songs along with a different cut of the “Oh! Gravity.” song “Dirty Second Hands”.

=== Vice Verses (2011–2012) ===
Switchfoot's eighth studio album, Vice Verses, was released on September 27, 2011, and debuted at No. 8 on the Billboard 200. According to Butler, the core of the record rests thematically in the idea of the polarity of life. A release date of September 27, 2011, was announced on AllAccess, with "Dark Horses" hitting modern rock radio on July 20.

In an interview with CBN.com, bassist Tim Foreman calls Vice Verses a cousin to Hello Hurricane, not a sequel to their last album, but related in some ways. Tim, speaking of his brother (Switchfoot's lead singer, Jon) said, "It features some of his best lyrical work," and said that he is happy with the musical component of the project as well. "From the very beginning, we set goals, one of them being to make a very rhythmic record, a very soulful record, and a very hard-hitting record that really pushes the boundaries, the highs and the lows," he told CBN.com.

Switchfoot performed a song for the Hawaii Five-0 soundtrack, released October 4, 2011, titled "Out of Control". On Record Store Day 2012, Switchfoot released their latest EP record, Vice Re-Verses. The digital download of the EP was later released on May 1.

=== Fading West album and film (2013–2015) ===
Switchfoot taking a bow at their Atlanta stop on the Fading West Tour – Buckhead Theatre, 2014

In May 2013, Switchfoot was on tour and filming a movie, Fading West. The band's guitarist Drew Shirley said that it was "a surf documentary mixed with behind the scenes footage of the band" and that "the soundtrack will be released as a CD and it will be [their] next album". On September 17, 2013, Switchfoot released Fading West EP containing three songs from the full-length album. Two songs on the EP, "Who We Are" and "Love Alone Is Worth the Fight", were released in different radio formats as the lead singles promoting the upcoming album. The Fading West film premiered during the Fading West Tour which started in September 2013, and was released digitally on December 10, 2013. Switchfoot's ninth studio album, also titled Fading West, was released on January 14, 2014, through lowercase people and Atlantic Records.

In February 2014, in a YouTube Interview with Relevant magazine, Jon Foreman hinted that a new album was coming out in late 2014 or early 2015 which would mostly consist of the songs that were cut from the Fading West film. The album, an EP titled The Edge of the Earth, was released on September 9, 2014. Foreman also announced that he would be releasing between 30–50 new songs for his solo albums most likely during 2015.

Switchfoot toured in the UK, Ireland, Germany, Switzerland, Austria and the Netherlands in May and June 2015. In July and August 2015, Switchfoot toured with Needtobreathe, Drew Holcomb and the Neighbors, and Colony House during the second leg of the 2015 "Tour De Compadres" tour.

=== Where the Light Shines Through and hiatus (2015–2017) ===
In August 2015, it was reported that Switchfoot would be releasing their tenth studio album in 2016. On April 29, 2016, Concord Music Group announced that the band had signed a worldwide recording and co-publishing deal with Vanguard Records imprint and Concord's sister publishing unit, The Bicycle Music Company. On May 12, 2016, Switchfoot announced that the album, titled Where the Light Shines Through, would be released on July 8, 2016. It was produced by Switchfoot and John Fields, with whom the band has worked on The Beautiful Letdown, Nothing Is Sound and Oh! Gravity. The band supported the album with the Looking for America Tour, featuring Relient K and traveled to over 70 cities from September 17, 2016, through February 2017.

On December 6, 2016, Switchfoot revealed through an email newsletter and on their website that the premiere of their new film, Live from Hollywood Palladium, would coincide with their 2017 Summer Getaway event.

In July 2017, the band took to the road touring with Lifehouse on the "Looking for Summer" tour where the band delivered 30+ shows across the U.S. and Canada. It was the first time that Lifehouse and Switchfoot had toured together. A new single, "Shine Like Gold," by Lifehouse and Switchfoot was released to help those affected by Hurricane Harvey while on tour.

On December 15, 2017, Switchfoot announced via their website and mailing list that, after returning home from their fall tour, they would be taking a hiatus "for the foreseeable future". The band said in their announcement, "For the first time in 20 years, we are taking an extended break."

=== Native Tongue and Covers (2018–2021) ===
On March 30, 2018, the band posted a clip on YouTube; they said that they had come out of their hiatus and were working on "Project 11". They previewed a heavy metal version of "Meant to Live", claiming it was their new sound. Two days later on April 1, it was revealed to be an April Fool's Joke.

On August 9, 2018, the band's song "You Found Me" was released as the single promoting the drama film Unbroken: Path to Redemption. The soundtrack album for the film was released on September 14, 2018.

On October 19, 2018, Switchfoot announced the release of their eleventh album Native Tongue on January 18, 2019, through Fantasy Records. In support of the album, the band embarked on a 2019 concert tour of the United States, supported by Colony House and Tyson Motsenbocker. The first single "Native Tongue" and its music video were released in conjunction with the album announcement.

In spring 2020, during the COVID-19 pandemic, Switchfoot started working on an EP titled Covers, containing the band's take on songs by Frank Ocean, Vampire Weekend, The Chainsmokers, The Verve, Harry Styles, and Jon Bellion. It was released on June 19, 2020 via Fantasy Records. They also played a monthly livestream concert called the "Fantastic Not Traveling Music Show" during which they played a variety of song requests spanning their career.

=== Interrobang and Drew Shirley departure (2021–2022) ===
On May 7, 2021, Switchfoot released "I Need You (To Be Wrong)" as the first single from their twelfth studio album Interrobang. The album was released on August 20, 2021. A "deluxe" edition of the album was released on July 8, 2022, the six year anniversary of their 2016 album "Where The Light Shines Through". Switchfoot returned to live touring opening for Needtobreathe on the "Into the Mystery Tour". They also collaborated with Needtobreathe on an Amazon original Christmas song titled "Hometown Christmas". On February 21, 2022, the band announced that Drew Shirley and the band were amicably parting ways.

=== Christmas album and The Beautiful Letdown rerecording (2022–2025) ===
In September 2022, the band announced their first Christmas album This Is Our Christmas Album. The album was released on November 4, 2022. In May 2023, to celebrate the 20th anniversary of their album The Beautiful Letdown, the band released The Beautiful Letdown (Our Version) and went on a tour playing the entire album live. In June 2024, the band hosted the 20th annual Bro-Am, which featured a guest appearance of former lead guitarist Drew Shirley.

The band are confirmed to be appearing at Welcome to Rockville taking place in Daytona Beach, Florida in May 2026.

=== Forever Now (2026–present) ===
In March 2026, while performing at SXSW in Austin, the band announced that a new album titled Forever Now would come out on June 26, 2026. The album's lead single, "Wake Up, Mr. Crow", was released on March 27, 2026. The announcement also confirmed that Boaz Roberts, who had been touring with the band since 2021, had officially joined as their new lead guitarist, once again expanding the band's lineup back to a quintet.

== Style and influences ==
Since Switchfoot's first release in 1997, the band's sound has significantly changed. The style of the early albums with independent label re:think Records consisted primarily of guitar-driven alternative rock, hard rock with characteristics of a three-man lineup, though they also incorporated string arrangements with slower songs.

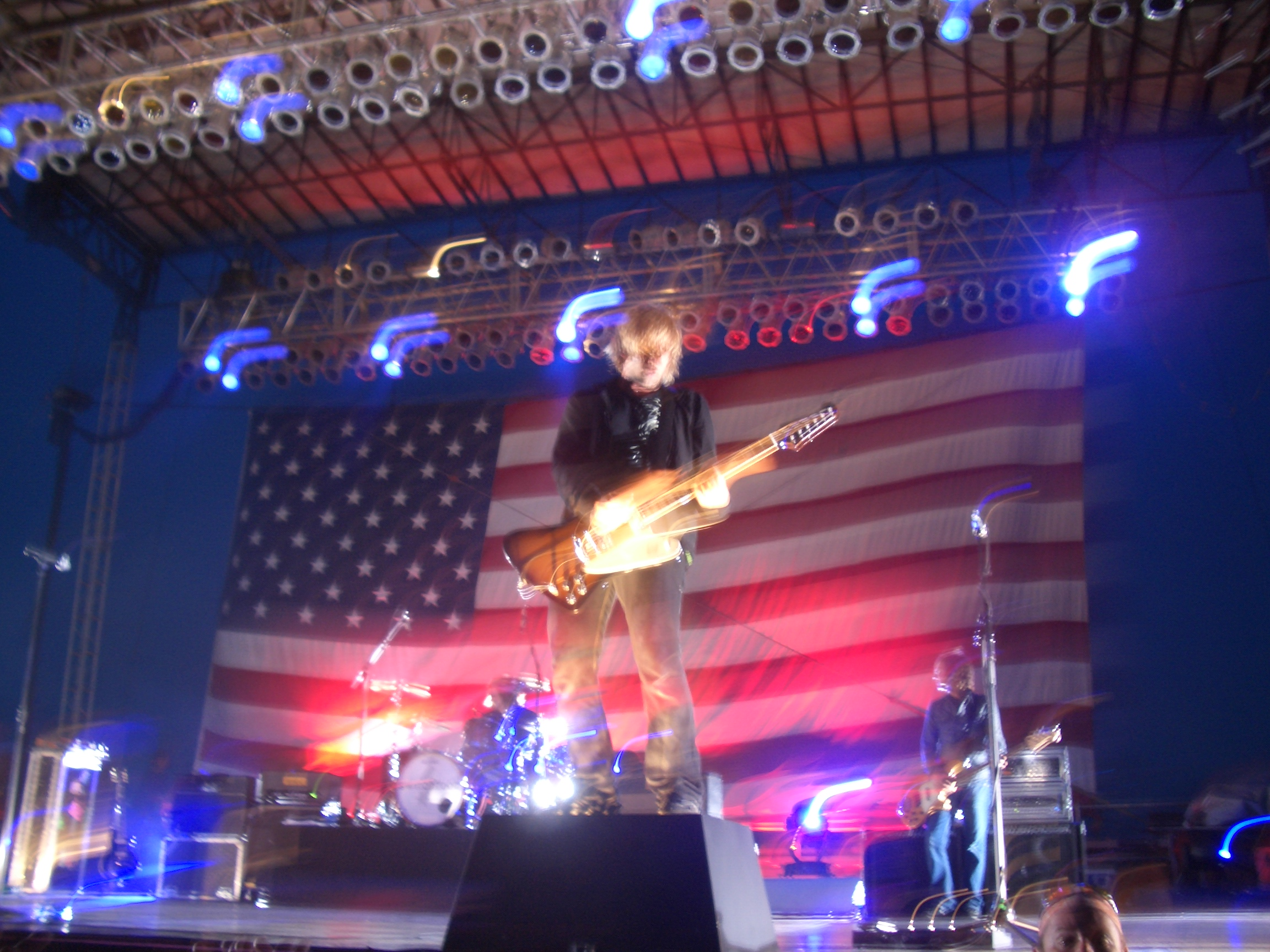
Switchfoot playing on July 4, 2005 in St. Louis

Switchfoot's frontman and guitarist Jon Foreman cites his musical influences as U2, The Beatles, and Keith Green; he said that he admires the vocal "strength and vulnerability" of Bob Dylan and Johnny Cash. Guitarist Drew Shirley cites U2, Miles Davis, Stevie Ray Vaughan, Tommy Walker, Phil Keaggy, Michael Jackson, Dave Matthews Band, and the Brand New Heavies while bassist Tim Foreman pays tribute to Stevie Wonder. Chad Butler also cites Dave Grohl as an influence for The Beautiful Letdown. "We've never fit in any of the genre boxes," says Jon Foreman. "I think that diversity is our strength".

With regard to their lyrics, Foreman notes "we try to make music for thinking people", which can be characterized by his allusions to the works of philosophers like Søren Kierkegaard and Augustine of Hippo in the songs "Sooner or Later (Soren's Song)" and "Something More (Augustine's Confession)" respectively. "Meant to Live", the band's runaway hit, was inspired by T. S. Eliot's poem "The Hollow Men", while "Stars", the lead single off Nothing Is Sound, briefly "looks at things from the Descartes perspective," according to Foreman.

== Christian music ==
Switchfoot is often referred to as a Christian rock band; even when signed to mainstream labels, their albums were still distributed to Christian retail outlets, their songs are featured on Christian radio and charts, they play at Christian festivals, and they are presented with Dove Awards. The band has always philosophically disagreed with this label; "We're Christian by faith, not genre," Tim Foreman explained to Rolling Stone in 2003.

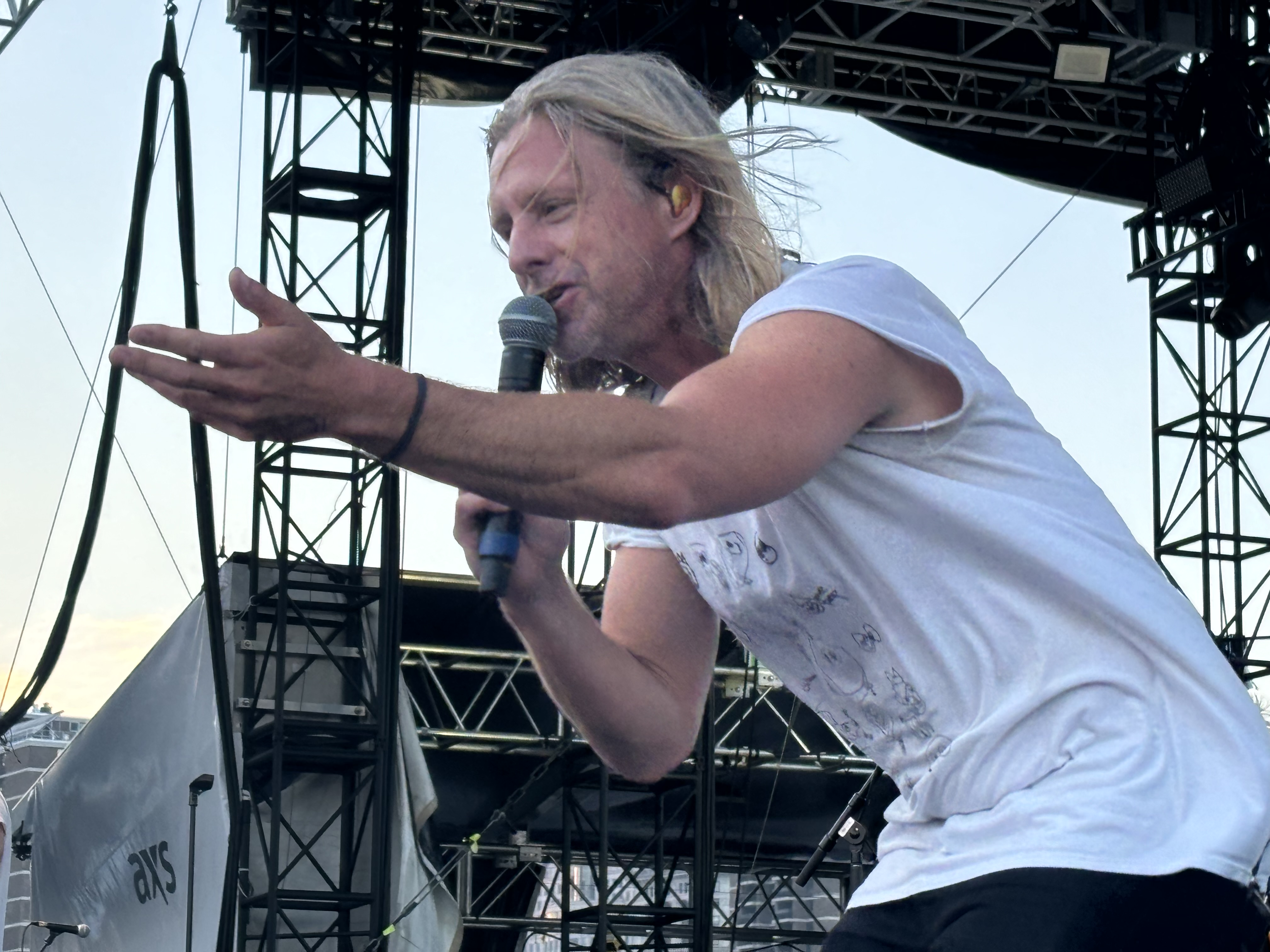
Jon Foreman of Switchfoot performs at Pier 17 in New York City as part of the Help From My Friends Tour on July 30, 2024.

Says Jon Foreman, "We've always been very open and honest about where the songs are coming from. For us, these songs are for everyone. Calling us 'Christian rock' tends to be a box that closes some people out and excludes them, and that's not what we're trying to do. Music has always opened my mind—and that's what we want".

"[Signing to Columbia was] a realization of something that we'd wanted to be from the beginning," Foreman explains. "When we were signed to re:think Records [an indie label], the goal was to get the music out to everybody. [But] when Sparrow [a Christian label] bought re:think Records, it was evident that our music wasn't going to be in the hands of everybody. As a Christian, I have a lot to say within the walls of the church. But also, as a Christian, I've got a lot to say just about life in general... So to be able to be on Columbia and on Sparrow felt like the realization of the two sides of what we had to say. It's a dream come true to be able to have songs that are outside of the box."

After the release of The Beautiful Letdown, the band temporarily stopped playing at Christian festivals and doing interviews with Christian organizations, as they found the speculation about their faith to be distracting from the music. Three years later, they went back to headlining at large Christian-based music festivals, and also agreed to be featured on the June 2006 cover of CCM Magazine after declining the opportunity for years. Yet in many ways they used the opportunity to describe their split from the CCM industry. That caused some, such as Spin writer Andrew Beaujon to say "their lyrics often have two different meanings, one meaning for a Christian audience and one meaning for the rest of us. They try to relate to two different groups of people at once." Jon Foreman has compared the Christian undertones of his music to the undertones of C. S. Lewis's books.

== Other projects ==
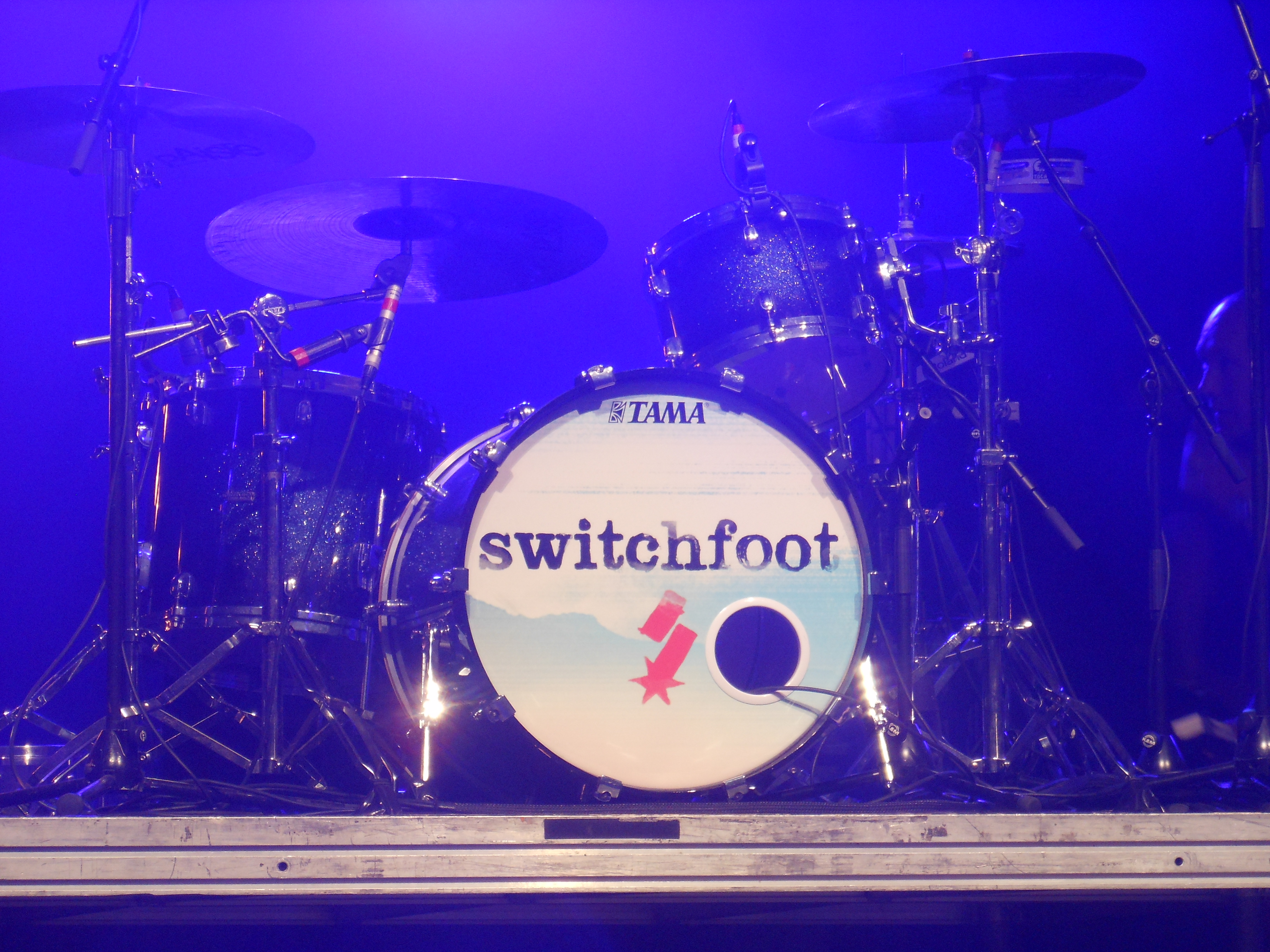
Switchfoot drum kit

Switchfoot has been involved in a number of humanitarian causes including with DATA, the ONE Campaign, the Keep A Breast Foundation, Habitat for Humanity, Invisible Children, and To Write Love on Her Arms.

In addition to supporting those causes, they founded the Switchfoot Bro-Am Surf Contest, an annual benefit contest and concert to raise money for various organizations serving homeless kids in the band's hometown of San Diego. Before recording Nothing Is Sound, the band made a trip to several South African villages in January 2005, which inspired the album's song "The Shadow Proves the Sunshine". Seeing an orphanage filled with infants who all lost their parents to AIDS, befriending orphans in the streets, and getting involved with a children's choir called the "Kuyasa Kids" moved them to start an organization called lowercase people. The organization originally published a quarterly online magazine for music, arts and social justice. They have also produced a CD by the Kuyasa Kids to help raise money for the children's communities.

In 2008, Switchfoot also got involved in the musical movement to spread awareness about 21st century slavery and human trafficking, performing "Awakening" for the documentary film Call + Response. Jon Foreman has released several solo projects, and is also involved in an acoustic collaboration called Fiction Family with Sean Watkins of the band Nickel Creek.

On Saturday, July 31, 2010, Switchfoot performed live at the 2010 Boy Scouts of America National Jamboree final arena show: "A Shining Light Across America" in Fort A.P. Hill, Virginia. Jon and Tim Foreman were both Boy Scouts in their youth, and were honored by the opportunity to perform at the Scouts' 100th anniversary event. The band performed at the Harvest America event on March 6, 2016 at ATT Stadium .

Switchfoot hosts a yearly charity event at Moonlight Beach in Encinitas, CA known as the "Bro Am". Established in 2005, the event benefits local and national charitable organizations, including the band's own Bro Am foundation. The Bro Am festivities typically include a silent auction before the public event in Encinitas, wherein donors bid in a silent auction for charity. The Bro Am event consists of surf contests in the morning and musical performances in the afternoon, culminating in Switchfoot's capstone performance. Since its inception, the Bro Am has raised over $1 million for charitable causes.

In 2017, Switchfoot joined forces with the fellow rock band Lifehouse, to help raise funds for Hurricane Harvey victims through their song "Shine Like Gold".

== Members ==
Current members

- Jon Foreman – lead vocals, guitar (1996–present) keyboards, piano (1999–present)
- Tim Foreman – bass, backing and occasional lead vocals, acoustic guitar (1996–present), keyboards (2000–2001)
- Chad Butler – drums, percussion (1996–present)
- Jerome Fontamillas – keyboards, piano, guitar, backing vocals (2001–present)
- Boaz Roberts – guitar, backing vocals (2026–present; touring and session musician 2021–2026)

Former members

- Drew Shirley – guitar (2005–2022; touring and session musician 2004–2005)

== Discography ==
- The Legend of Chin (1997)
- New Way to Be Human (1999)
- Learning to Breathe (2000)
- The Beautiful Letdown (2003)
- Nothing Is Sound (2005)
- Oh! Gravity. (2006)
- Hello Hurricane (2009)
- Vice Verses (2011)
- Fading West (2014)
- Where the Light Shines Through (2016)
- Native Tongue (2019)
- Interrobang (2021)
- This Is Our Christmas Album (2022)
- Forever Now (2026)

== Awards ==
Switchfoot won a Grammy Award for Best Rock or Rap Gospel Album in 2011 with Hello Hurricane. They've also garnered eleven GMA Dove Awards and twelve San Diego Music Awards.
