= The Chronicles of Narnia: Prince Caspian (soundtrack) =

The Chronicles of Narnia: Prince Caspian (An Original Walt Disney Records Soundtrack)

Soundtrack album by Harry Gregson-Williams
- Released: May 13, 2008
- Genre: Soundtrack
- Length: 75:09
- Label: Walt Disney Records
- Producer: Harry Gregson-Williams

Singles from The Chronicles of Narnia: Prince Caspian (Original Motion Picture Soundtrack)
- 1. "The Call" Released: 2008; 2. "This Is Home" Released: April 25, 2008 (to radio) October 21, 2008 (radio re-ship)

The Chronicles of Narnia: Prince Caspian (An Original Walt Disney Records Soundtrack) is the soundtrack to the film The Chronicles of Narnia: Prince Caspian. Harry Gregson-Williams composed the soundtrack, which was released on May 13, 2008 in the United States by Walt Disney Records.

It has been praised by critics for being "darker" and "more grown up" than the previous soundtrack, but criticized for reusing many of the themes from the first film.

Professional ratings
Review scores
Source	Rating
Allmusic	3.5/5 stars
IGN	(8.0/10)

== Track listing ==
All songs performed by Harry Gregson-Williams except where noted.

No.	Title	Writer(s)	Artist(s)	Length
1.	"Prince Caspian Flees"	Harry Gregson-Williams		4:33
2.	"The Kings and Queens of Old"	Harry Gregson-Williams		3:33
3.	"Journey to the How"	Harry Gregson-Williams		4:45
4.	"Arrival at Aslan's How"	Harry Gregson-Williams		2:57
5.	"Raid on the Castle"	Harry Gregson-Williams		7:05
6.	"Miraz Crowned"	Harry Gregson-Williams		4:47
7.	"Sorcery and Sudden Vengeance"	Harry Gregson-Williams		6:16
8.	"The Duel"	Harry Gregson-Williams		5:56
9.	"The Armies Assemble"	Harry Gregson-Williams		2:22
10.	"Battle at Aslan's How"	Harry Gregson-Williams		5:17
11.	"Return of the Lion"	Harry Gregson-Williams		4:16
12.	"The Door in the Air"	Harry Gregson-Williams		7:52
13.	"The Call"	Regina Spektor	Regina Spektor	3:08
14.	"A Dance 'Round the Memory Tree"	Oren Lavie	Oren Lavie	3:42
15.	"This Is Home"	Jon Foreman; Adam Watts; Andy Dodd	Switchfoot	3:54
16.	"Lucy"	Hanne Hukkelberg	Hanne Hukkelberg	4:33
Total length:				75:09

- Both "The Call" and "This Is Home" appear in the movie slightly altered in lyrics and music making them different from the soundtrack version.
- "Lucy" did not appear in the theatrical version. However, it makes its full appearance on the DVD.

== Musicians ==
- Composed, produced, and conducted by Harry Gregson-Williams
- Additional music by Stephen Barton, Halli Cauthery and David Buckley
- Percussion programming by Hybrid
- Orchestra contracted by Isobel Griffiths
- Concertmaster: Perry Montague-Mason
- Choir performed by The Bach Choir, Apollo Voices and the Crouch End Festival Chorus

== Charts ==
Chart (2008)	Peak position
Austrian Albums (Ö3 Austria)	75
German Albums (Media Control)	76
Swiss Albums (Schweizer Hitparade)	96
U.S. Billboard 200	26
U.S. Billboard Top Soundtracks	3

== Awards ==
In 2009, the album won a Dove Award for Special Event Album of the Year at the 40th GMA Dove Awards.
