= Only Hope =

1999 song by Switchfoot

Song by Switchfoot

from the album New Way to Be Human
- Released: March 11, 1999
- Recorded: re:think Studio
- Genre: Alternative rock, soft rock
- Length: 3:48
- Label: re:think Records
- Songwriter: Jon Foreman
- Producer: Charlie Peacock

"Only Hope" is a song by American rock band Switchfoot. It was written by Jon Foreman for their 1999 album New Way to Be Human. The Christian-themed song is featured prominently in one of the scenes of the 2002 film A Walk to Remember.

== Cover versions ==
=== Mandy Moore version ===
"Only Hope"

Song by Mandy Moore

from the album A Walk to Remember
- Released: 2002
- Studio: Leapyear Studios (Los Angeles, CA); NorthStar Studios (Boulder, CO); Studio X (Seattle, WA)
- Length: 3:54
- Songwriter: Jon Foreman
- Producer: Mervyn Warren

Audio
- "Only Hope" on YouTube

"Only Hope" was recorded by Mandy Moore for the 2002 film A Walk to Remember (arranged and produced by the film's composer Mervyn Warren) and its soundtrack. The song was included on her first greatest hits album The Best of Mandy Moore in 2004.

=== Other versions ===
In 2020, Mat and Savanna Shaw released a cover version of "Only Hope" on their debut album Picture This.

== Charts ==
=== Year-end charts ===
Chart (2011)	Position
South Korea Foreign (Circle)	77
