= Rethink (record label) =

American record label

Re:Think Records
- Parent company: Universal Music Group
- Founded: 1996
- Founder: Charlie Peacock
- Distributor: Capitol Music Group
- Genre: Pop rock, acoustic rock
- Country of origin: United States

Re:think is an imprint label under Capitol Christian Music Group, founded by Charlie Peacock in 1996. It signed several acts, including This World Fair, The Colour, Sarah Masen and Switchfoot. Re:think is well known for supporting One Campaign as well as the lowercase people Justice Fund.

== History ==
Re:Think was founded in 1996 by music industry veteran Charlie Peacock, with the intention of marketing artists outside of the usual CCM box. "I never really wanted to be associated with it as a genre," he says.

With this vision in place, Peacock signed on and developed acts like Sarah Masen and Switchfoot. However, just before the release of Switchfoot's first record, The Legend of Chin, Re:Think was bought out by CCM industry magnate, Sparrow Records, thus halting Peacock's vision for the time being. Subsequently, the artists signed to Re:Think were marketed primarily to the Christian music scene. "When Sparrow bought re:think Records, it was evident that our music wasn't going to be in the hands of everybody," says Jon Foreman, frontman of the band Switchfoot. "As a Christian, I have a lot to say within the walls of the church. But also, as a Christian, I've got a lot to say just about life in general."

== See also ==
- List of record labels
