= Oh! Gravity. =

2006 album by Switchfoot

Studio album by Switchfoot
- Released: December 26, 2006
- Recorded: 2006
- Studios: Big Fish Recordings, Encinitas, California; Signature Sound, San Diego, California; Starstruck Studio
- Genres: Art rock; post-punk; power pop; punk rock
- Length: 44:44
- Label: Columbia/Sony BMG
- Producers: Tim Palmer; Steve Lillywhite; Switchfoot; John Fields

Switchfoot chronology
Nothing Is Sound (2005)	Oh! Gravity. (2006)	Best of Bootlegs Vol. 1 (2008)

Singles from Oh! Gravity.
- 1. "Dirty Second Hands" Released: September 26, 2006; 2. "Oh! Gravity." Released: October 21, 2006; 3. "Awakening" Released: March 26, 2007; 4. "Head over Heels (In This Life)" Released: November 11, 2007

Oh! Gravity. is the sixth album by the San Diego–based alternative rock band Switchfoot. It was released on December 26, 2006. It was Switchfoot's last album released through Columbia Records and Sony BMG (Their next album was released through lowercase people records).

To give fans a preview of the new material, Switchfoot released the downloadable single "Dirty Second Hands" to major online music stores on September 26. The album's first radio single, the title song "Oh! Gravity.", was released to radio on October 31, and received moderate airplay on alternative stations across America. In addition, the band provided free streaming audio of both the aforementioned tracks on their MySpace page.

The album debuted on the Billboard 200 at number 18, as the second-highest debut of the week, selling 63,000 copies in its first week. As of June 2010, the album had sold 262,000+ copies.

== Production ==
=== Background and recording ===
The concept of Oh! Gravity. originally began as a short EP recording. "We weren't trying to achieve anything; we just set out to make music for ourselves," lead vocalist and principal songwriter Jon Foreman said of the process. Switchfoot, who tour heavily throughout the year, took a break in spring of 2006 between legs of the Nothing Is Sound Tour to record five or six song ideas with producer John Fields. During their time in the studio, the band found that they had more than enough time to record additional songs, and decided to put together a full-length LP, which they have called their most "sincere" effort yet.

Enlisting their A&R producer Steve Lillywhite, the band tracked the song "Awakening" and were enlivened by his fresh approach to recording. Lillywhite emphasized the "How does it make you feel?" approach to the process, "which felt great" according to Foreman. "We spent far more time rehearsing and refining the song than we did actually recording it... Don't press record until you get things right."

The rest of the record was produced by Tim Palmer, who Foreman described as possessing the uncanny ability to get "everyone out of their skins, where you begin to forget that the mics are there."

=== Music and lyrical themes ===
While the band's previous effort, 2005's Nothing Is Sound, was termed "darker," Oh! Gravity. represented a departure from that densely layered sound. It was an attempt to find the balance between "spit and polish" as Foreman said. "This one's got a lot more spit." As such, the album was lighter on the sonic layering, with less production elements than Nothing Is Sound or even The Beautiful Letdown, and carried a more pop direction, with new experimentation into areas the band had not previously explored, while also returning to their lo-fi indie roots. Topics explore living, time, coping with the death of a loved one, and, most dominantly, anti-materialism, particularly in the songs "American Dream" and "4:12," with the lyrics: "You begin to believe/that all we are is material/it's nonsensical."

== Promotion and release ==
On June 2 Switchfoot e-mailed a newsletter containing a free download of an unreleased song, "Daylight to Break," along with a statement from Tim Foreman implying that the band wanted to have a new album out by the end of the year, as well as thanking their fans for helping keep the band together for ten years. The recording of this album was rather public, as Switchfoot had set up a webcam in their recording studio, and also continued to keep fans updated via their podcasts. A contest was also conducted to give fans a chance to win an opportunity to be in the studio with the band to play cowbell on one of the tracks.

In early August, Switchfoot announced that the album was complete. By late September, the band had released the song "Dirty Second Hands" as a downloadable single to further promote the album. In early October, the band made the songs "Dirty Second Hands" and "Oh! Gravity" available for streaming on their MySpace page, the latter of which was serviced to Modern Rock radio as the lead single for the record. The entire album also "leaked" on MTV2.com in the week leading up to the album's official release. In addition, the band launched the website OhGravity.com, which featured the title track and YouTube clips that highlighted "gravity at its best" - mainly people falling while skateboarding, surfing, and participating in other similar activities. The website is no longer up.

== Critical reception ==
Professional ratings
Review scores
Source	Rating
AllMusic	3.5/5 stars
Alternative Press	3.5/5 stars
Christian Music Today	4.5/5 stars
Cross Rhythms	10/10 stars
Entertainment Weekly	B−
IGN	8.2/10
Jesus Freak Hideout	3/5 stars
Melodic	3.5/5 stars
Paste	3.5/5 stars
Rolling Stone	2/5 stars

=== Awards and accolades ===
In 2008, the album was nominated for a Dove Award for Rock/Contemporary Album of the Year at the 39th GMA Dove Awards. The song "Awakening" was also nominated for Rock/Contemporary Recorded Song of the Year.

== Track listing ==
All tracks are written by Jon Foreman, except where noted.

Oh! Gravity. track listing
No.	Title	Writer(s)	Length
1.	"Oh! Gravity."	Jon Foreman; Tim Foreman	2:30
2.	"American Dream"		3:09
3.	"Dirty Second Hands"	J. Foreman; Todd Cooper	3:18
4.	"Awakening"		4:11
5.	"Circles"		4:06
6.	"Amateur Lovers"		4:36
7.	"Faust, Midas, and Myself"		3:51
8.	"Head Over Heels (In This Life)"		3:41
9.	"Yesterdays"	J. Foreman; T. Foreman	4:04
10.	"Burn Out Bright"	J. Foreman; T. Foreman	3:24
11.	"4:12"		4:12
12.	"Let Your Love Be Strong"		3:47
Total length:			44:44

Japanese edition bonus track
No.	Title	Length
13.	"American Dream" (acoustic)	3:04
Total length:		47:48

iTunes and Rhapsody bonus tracks
No.	Title	Length
13.	"American Dream" (acoustic)	3:04
14.	"Dirty Second Hands" (Live Bootleg from Tulsa, OK)	4:50
Total length:		52:38

Best Buy bonus tracks
No.	Title	Writer(s)	Length
13.	"Burn Out Bright" (acoustic)	J. Foreman; T. Foreman	3:32
14.	"C'mon C'mon" (remix)		3:23
Total length:			51:39

Circuit City bonus tracks*
No.	Title	Length
13.	"C'mon C'mon" (acoustic)	2:25
14.	"American Dream" (acoustic)	3:04
Total length:		49:53

Walmart bonus track*
No.	Title	Length
13.	"American Dream" (acoustic)	3:04
Total length:		47:48

EMI bonus track
No.	Title	Length
13.	"Revenge"	4:09
Total length:		48:53

- *In these versions, "American Dream (Acoustic)" is available as a digital download.

== Personnel ==
Recorded at Big Fish Recordings, Encinitas, California. Additional recording at Signature Sound, San Diego, and Starstruck Studio.

Mixed at Paramount Recording, Hollywood, and South Beach Studios, Miami. Mastered at Sterling Sound, New York City.

Switchfoot

- Jon Foreman – lead vocals, rhythm guitar, lead guitar
- Tim Foreman – bass guitar, backing vocals
- Chad Butler – drums
- Jerome Fontamillas – rhythm guitar, keyboard, backing vocals
- Drew Shirley – lead guitar

Additional musicians

- Keith Tutt II – cello (tracks 7, 11 and 12)
- Kybra Minisee – violin (tracks 7, 11 and 12)
- Sidney Cabrera – violin (tracks 7, 11 and 12)
- Andy Geibon – horns (tracks 6 and 12)
- Charlie Peacock – Chimus Minutus (track 12)
- Mark Felthamon – harmonica (tracks 7 and 11)
- Sarah Mooridian – cowbell (track 6)
- Sean Watkins and Sara Watkins – guest vocals and mandolin (track 5)
- Noah Lamberth – Space Pedal Steel (track 9)
- "Care House Choir": Jennifer, Lukas, Dawn, Tierra, Lynsey, Steffany, Luke, and Devin – vocals (track 10)
- Tim Lord Palmer – additional "window treatments"

Additional personnel

- Steve Lillywhite – executive producer, production (track 4)
- Tim Palmer – production, additional production (tracks 4, 5 and 12), recording, mixing
- Switchfoot – production, additional production (track 4), additional recording
- John Fields – production (tracks 3, 5, 12), additional recording, mixing (track 3)
- Tom Lord-Alge – mixing (tracks 2 and 4)
- Ted Jensen – mastering
- Steven Miller – additional recording
- Chris Testa – additional recording
- Joe Marlett – additional recording
- Michael Harris – recording assistant
- Matt Beckley – recording assistant
- Cameron Barton – recording assistant
- Zeph Sowers – recording assistant
- Jamie Seyberth – assistant mix engineer
- Femio Hernandez – assistant mix engineer (tracks 2 and 4)
- Joshua Marc Levy – art direction and illustration
- Andy Barron – photography

== Charts ==
Chart performance for Oh! Gravity.
Chart (2007)	Peak position
Australian Albums (ARIA)	74
US Billboard 200	18
US Top Christian Albums (Billboard)	1
US Top Rock Albums (Billboard)	4

== Release history ==
Release history for Oh! Gravity.
Region	Date
United States	December 26, 2006
United Kingdom	January 1, 2007

== Oh! EP. ==
Oh! EP.

EP by Switchfoot
- Released: October 17, 2006
- Recorded: 2006
- Genres: Alternative rock, hard rock, post-grunge
- Length: 9:28
- Label: Independent

Professional ratings
Review scores
Source	Rating
Jesus Freak Hideout	3.5/5 stars

Pre-orders of "Oh! Gravity." from switchfoot.com came bundled with a three-song EP that the band recorded in the same studio sessions as "Oh! Gravity." The EP was first made available on October 17, 2006, at Switchfoot's live shows but became available online as well. It later became available separately on the Switchfoot online store.

=== Track listing ===
Oh! EP. track listing
No.	Title	Writer(s)	Length
1.	"The Sound in My Mouth"	J. Foreman	3:56
2.	"C'mon C'mon"	J. Foreman	2:55
3.	"Oh! Gravity." (Acoustic)	J. Foreman, T. Foreman	2:37
