= The Beautiful Letdown =

Studio album by Switchfoot
- Released: February 25, 2003
- Studios: Jon Foreman's house, Mansfield Lodge, Sage and Sound
- Genres: Alternative rock, post-grunge
- Length: 44:18
- Labels: RED Ink, Columbia/Sony BMG
- Producers: John Fields, Switchfoot

Switchfoot chronology
Learning to Breathe (2000)	The Beautiful Letdown (2003)	Switchfoot: Live – EP (2004)

Singles from The Beautiful Letdown
- 1. "More Than Fine" Released: January 2003; 2. "Meant to Live" Released: January 27, 2003; 3. "Gone" Released: June 2003; 4. "Ammunition" Released: July 8, 2003; 5. "Dare You to Move" Released: February 6, 2004; 6. "This Is Your Life" Released: September 17, 2004

The Beautiful Letdown is the fourth studio album by alternative rock band Switchfoot, released on February 25, 2003, by RED Ink Records, and later re-released through Sony Music. It marked the band's first release on a major label and their first release with keyboardist Jerome Fontamillas. The album was produced by John Fields and Switchfoot and recorded over a span of around two weeks; all songs on the album were written either in part or entirely by lead singer Jon Foreman.

The album thematically covers the human condition, with its lyrics expressing a "dissatisfaction with the status quo"; it focuses more on asking questions rather than answering them, a writing style Foreman described as "Socratic". Compared to the band's previous "lo-fi" efforts, The Beautiful Letdown adopts a more "polished" production style. Musically, the album has been described as alternative rock and post-grunge while also incorporating electronic instruments and digital effects. The album received acclaim from critics. It received praise for its musical diversity and for discussing difficult themes and spiritual topics without being evangelistic. The Beautiful Letdown and its singles were nominated for multiple awards at the 35th GMA Dove Awards and 36th GMA Dove Awards, winning several of them. Critics labeled it one of the best Christian albums of 2003 and the 2000s, and it has since been regarded as one of the best Christian albums of all time.

The album sold 14,000 copies in its first week; the singles "Meant to Live" and "Dare You to Move" became mainstream hits, charting in the top 20 on the Billboard Hot 100 and the top ten on the Billboard Alternative Songs chart. Their crossover success led The Beautiful Letdown to ultimately peak at number 16 on the Billboard 200, and it spent the 10th-longest run on the chart of the 2000s. It spent a record-breaking 38 weeks atop the Billboard Christian Albums chart, and ranked as the second-best-selling Christian album of the 2000s. Five of its singles ultimately peaked at number one on at least one Christian radio format. The Beautiful Letdown has been certified triple platinum by the Recording Industry Association of America (RIAA) and certified gold by Music Canada; as of 2023, it has sold over three million copies.

== Background and recording ==
The Beautiful Letdown marked Switchfoot's first album released on a mainstream record label; their prior three albums had been released on Christian music labels. Lead singer Jon Foreman felt that the decision of Columbia Records to sign the band was interesting given how "spiritually driven" the album is. Prior to recording the album, the band added a new member, keyboardist Jerome Fontamillas. A longtime friend of Foreman, Fontamillas quit his day job as a "suit" in an office building and asked to join the band as a keyboardist. The album was recorded quickly, over a span of around two weeks. Foreman said this is the "best way" to make an album because it "hits hard" and allows "the mistakes and the beautiful parts" to be together. Switchfoot did not want to "waste time screwing around in a $1000 a day studio"; the album was pre-produced in Foreman's bedroom and recording was handled over a two-week session with minimal breaks.

According to Foreman, many of the songs on The Beautiful Letdown were written years before the album was recorded. Switchfoot opted to re-record "Dare You to Move" - a song previously on their 2000 album Learning to Breathe - because they felt it "hadn't lived its shelf life yet"; in addition to regarding it as a "defining song" that they wanted people being introduced to their music to hear, they felt that years of performing it live had given them a better idea of how they wanted it to sound.

The Beautiful Letdown was produced by John Fields and Switchfoot; Charlie Peacock was also credited with production on "Dare You to Move". The album was recorded at Mansfield Lodge, Jon Foreman's house, and Sage and Sound, and it was mixed at Larrabee Sound Studios, Image Recording Studios, South Beach Studios, and Ocean Way Recording. The album artwork for The Beautiful Letdown was taken at a hotel pool in north Los Angeles. Originally, the band had purchased a cheap guitar with the intent of breaking it in half and setting it on fire. However, the hotel did not allow the band to set the guitar on fire, and Jon Foreman became "too attached" to the guitar to break it in half. Instead, they threw the guitar on the bottom of the pool.

== Composition ==
The Beautiful Letdown has been described as post-grunge and alternative rock. Compared to their previous "lo-fi" efforts, it sports a greater emphasis on rock and has a higher production quality. It also incorporates electronic instruments, synthesizers, and digital effects. The album's lyrical themes cover "doubt, questioning, and fear" and the human condition; Jon Foreman described it as "an honest attempt to reflect on the great and terrible aspects of being human, the tension of existence." Most songs on the album express a "dissatisfaction with the status quo." Christianity Today writer Russ Breimeier noted that the track order thematically follows the spiritual path to Christianity but rarely mentions Jesus or explicitly spiritual themes overtly; this approach had previously achieved commercial success through crossover bands like Jars of Clay, dc Talk, and P.O.D. Mark Joseph of National Review said that The Beautiful Letdown generally eschews answering questions and instead focuses broadly on asking questions, with answers "[finding] their voice in lines that could be easily missed." Joseph compared this lyrical approach to that of Jesus, who frequently asked vague or cryptic questions aimed at "those who have ears to hear." Foreman described this lyrical approach as "Socratic", "where the listener is actually the one who is being forced to think and ask themselves the question."

"Meant to Live" features "chunky", distorted guitars and presents an "a simple, yet impassioned plea for us to stop, look at our lives and evaluate what's really important", with the bridge expressing a longing for more than the "wars of our fathers" and instead for "second life." Although interpreted by some as a criticism of the Iraq War, the song was written before the war. According to Jon Foreman, the lyrics of "Meant to Live" are about "being put off by pop culture... It's a song that [says], 'When I look at the magazine pages or a TV screen, I know there's nothing they can sell me that will satisfy me. And when I look at the sunset or the stars, I am reminded that there's something inside of me that's meant to live for more than what pop culture often sells us." "This Is Your Life", a ballad with electronic influences, opens with electronic instruments before shifting to incorporate acoustic guitar and drums. The song focuses on the theme of living in the moment instead of for yesterday, declaring that "today is all you've got now/and today is all you'll ever have." The chorus asks the listener if their life is what they imagined it would be when they were younger. "More Than Fine", an alternative pop song; Stephanie Ottosen of CCM Magazine compared its musical style to the work of John Mayer. The song encourages listeners to look inward and to not be content with things as they are. Foreman described the song as being inspired lyrically by punk music's "commitment to change" and lack of contentment with how things are, and said it could be considered a "punk tune disguised as pop."

The upbeat rock song "Ammunition" presents mankind as "the fuse and ammunition" responsible for the human condition. It features distorted guitars and an aggressive music style comparable to the garage rock style of Switchfoot's first album, The Legend of Chin (1997). "Dare You to Move" was originally written for and featured on the band's previous album Learning to Breathe. According to Jesse Lord of IGN, it musically adopts a slower tempo mixed with "elements of hard rock". It presents a contrast between "who you are and who you could be" and urges the listener to live for the day. "Redemption" adopts a musical style similar to that of Learning to Breathe. The title track is the longest on the album and focusses on the themes of not belonging in the world and the futility of pursuing wealth. "Gone", an upbeat alternative hip hop and alternative rock song, discusses the inevitability of death; its musical style, incorporating "hip-hop beats, lite-funk guitar, [and] free-associative barbershop harmonies", was compared to Third Eye Blind's "Semi-Charmed Life". "On Fire", a "gentle" ballad, is one of the slower-tempo songs on the album. "Adding to the Noise", a rock song, criticizes radio and media for creating hype and "noise." It also questions the band's place and tells listeners to stop listening to them if they are adding to the noise. The album closes with "24", a ballad that lyrically focuses on belief in the midst of questions and the progress to become more like Christ. Foreman described the song as about "wanting to be united in one person" and as his personal favorite song on the album.

== Critical reception ==
Professional ratings
Review scores
Source	Rating
AllMusic	4/5 stars
Robert Christgau	(1-star Honorable Mention)
Christianity Today	5/5 stars
Cross Rhythms	10/10 stars
HM	2.5/5 stars 2/5 stars
IGN	9.0/10
Jesus Freak Hideout	4.5/5 stars
Melodic	4.5/5 stars

According to Christianity Today, The Beautiful Letdown received "universal acclaim" from critics. It received four out of five stars from Allmusic, and reviewer Johnny Lotfus praised it as being "melodic and well paced" despite feeling that it was "kind of all over the place" musically. Russ Breimeier of Christianity Today gave it five out of five stars, calling it as "wholly satisfying modern-rock effort" while praising the album's "thought-provoking" lyrics and production value, pointing to "Dare You to Move" as being "clearly an improvement" over the previous version on Learning to Breathe. The Beautiful Letdown received an honorable mention from Robert Christgau, who praised the album's lyrical focus and listed "Ammunition" and "Gone" as its highlights. The album received ten out of ten squares from Tony Cummings of Cross Rhythms, who called it a "truly brilliant album" and praised its heavier musical tone compared to the band's previous albums, describing it as "harder and punchier than ever". IGN's Jesse Lord gave the album a score of 9.0 out of 10, offering praise for its lyrics for drawing from the band's Christian beliefs but for not being "overtly preachy". Pär Winberg of Melodic gave it 4.5 out of 5 stars and described the album as "easily [Switchfoot's] best to date" and a "sure buy".

CBN reviewer Mark Weber applauded The Beautiful Letdown as being "musically potent" and "hopeful". Stephanie Ottosen of CCM Magazine called the album a "thinking man’s rock ’n’ roll" and praised it being "one of the best [albums] I’ve heard in some time". Mikael Wood of Village Voice said it "might be the most intelligent, least hysterical piece of alt-rock evangelism I’ve ever heard" and praised its musical diversity. Gary Glauber of PopMatters called the album "well executed and well produced" and praised its lyrical focus on the "human condition", saying that "when rocking out to them on some beach somewhere, it's cool to think that some folks might just stop for a second and ponder the meaning of life." In National Review, Mark Joseph favorably contrasted the album's lyrical focus on "profoundly disturbing and troubling questions" on the meaning of life with the "comfortable, safe, and nice American brand" of evangelical Christianity. He also lauded the band for focusing more on presenting questions to listeners and encouraging them to "change themselves from within" rather than offering specific answers, noting parallels to Jesus's approach in the gospels. Jesus Freak Hideout writer Blake Garris gave The Beautiful Letdown 4.5 out of 5 stars and felt that it would allow Switchfoot to go from "one of Christian music's best kept secrets" to a successful mainstream band.

HM writer Doug van Pelt awarded the album 2.5 out of 5 stars, while managing editor David Allen gave it 2 out of 5 stars. Indie rock editor Chris Rose said "there is one word in the title of Switchfoot’s latest project that could accurately describe the entirety of the CD – and it is not 'Beautiful'". Rose lambasted the album as having "songs and instruments watered-down with mediocrity", and said it was "well produced" on the whole but "machine-fed and extremely CCM".

=== Awards and accolades ===
At the 35th GMA Dove Awards, The Beautiful Letdown won the award for Rock/Contemporary Album of the Year. "Meant to Live" won the award for Rock/Contemporary Recorded Song of the Year and was also nominated for Song of Year, "Ammunition" won the award for Rock Recorded Song of the Year, and "Gone" was nominated for Rock/Contemporary Recorded Song of the Year. "Meant to Live" was nominated again for Song of Year at the 36th GMA Dove Awards along with "Dare You to Move", which won the award for Rock/Contemporary Recorded Song of the Year. The Beautiful Letdown won the awards for Album of the Year and Best Pop Album at the 2003 San Diego Music Awards, and at the 2004 San Diego Music Awards, "Dare You to Move" won the award for Song of the Year.

The Beautiful Letdown was ranked as the best Christian album of 2003 by Christianity Today. Jesus Freak Hideout's staff all listed the album as the best or second-best album of the year and Kevin McNeese of New Release Today placed it among his top ten albums of the year. It has since been regarded as one of the best Christian albums of all time. In 2010, HM ranked The Beautiful Letdown as the 11th-best Christian rock album of all time and repudiated their initially negative review of the album as "wrong"; in 2016, van Pelt described his unfavorable review and the magazine's initial assessment of the album as "wrong". Alex Eaton of The Buffalo News described it as "arguably the best and most influential Christian album of all time" in 2011. In 2016, Kevin Sparkman, the managing editor of CCM Magazine, described The Beautiful Letdown as "the album of the 2000s" and noted that "Dare You to Move" had "transcended genres and formats". The magazine also ranked it as the band's best album in 2019. In 2015, Joel Heng Hartse of Christianity Today called the album the last of the "golden era" of contemporary Christian music.

== Release and promotion ==
When Columbia Records signed Switchfoot from Sparrow Records, Columbia gained the rights to sell the band's records to mainstream outlets while Sparrow retained the right to sell them in the Christian market. Mainstream sales of The Beautiful Letdown were handled by the Columbia-owned RED Ink Records, while sales to Christian outlets were handled by Chordant, which was a distributor of EMI Records.

Although the band had signed to a major record label, support from Sony itself was lacking. Prior to promotion, the band went to New York City to perform some of the songs for record executives. According to Foreman, the performance went poorly; the record executive went into a "profanity-induced tirade" midway through the first song. As a result, the band received no support from the label for touring, marketing, or radio. According to Jim Farber of the New York Daily News, this deal, combined with the album's mainstream release on the "tiny farm label" Red Ink, was a sign that Columbia had "little faith" in the band. Originally, the album was planned for a release in October 2002, but this release was pushed back to February 2003. Jon Foreman attributed the delay in release to the size of Sony Records and said it "just takes a little bit longer" when working with a "big battleship" of a company. In hindsight, Foreman felt the relegation to Red Ink was "actually the best thing that could’ve happened to us, because not only did everyone at Red Ink believe in this album and fight for it, it galvanized why we do what we do, and the idea that we don’t play music for the people who don’t understand it. We’re not for everyone, we’re going to be for ourselves. Irrespective of whether people get it or not, we’re going to sing our songs."

"More Than Fine" was released as the first single to Christian radio while "Meant to Live" was released as the first single to the Christian rock, college, and alternative radio formats; the singles reached the number one position on the Radio & Records Christian CHR and Christian Rock charts, respectively. According to Billboard, The Beautiful Letdown sold 14,000 copies in its first week; 70% of sales came from Christian bookstores. The album opened at number 85 on the Billboard 200 and number two on the Billboard Christian Albums chart.

"Gone" began charting on Christian radio in June 2003, peaking at number one on the Christian CHR chart. By the time "Gone" had spent its fifth week atop the Christian CHR chart in October 2003, "Meant to Live" had advanced to the top 20 on the alternative radio charts. "Meant to Live" reached its peak of number five on the Billboard Alternative Songs in January 2004 and in 2004 it charted in the top 10 on the Billboard Adult Top 40 and Pop Airplay charts and number 18 on the Billboard Hot 100. It also charted internationally, peaking at number 29 in the UK, number 52 in Australia, and number 92 in the Netherlands.

"Dare You to Move" was released to Christian radio on February 2, 2002 and peaked at number one on the Christian CHR chart. "Dare You to Move" also achieved success on mainstream radio, reaching the top ten on the Alternative Songs, Adult Top 40, and Pop Airplay charts, number 17 on the Hot 100, and number 35 in Australia. Another single, "This Is Your Life", became the album's fifth number-one single on Christian radio and also charted on the Alternative Songs and Adult Top 40 charts.

The crossover success of "Meant To Live" and "Dare You to Move" led to an increase in sales for The Beautiful Letdown in both the Christian and mainstream markets. It reached the peak position of the Christian Albums chart on January 17, 2004, its 45th week on the chart; It would ultimately spend 38 weeks atop the Christian Albums chart, the longest run at the top spot since the chart had switched to a weekly format in 1995. The Beautiful Letdown had sold 435,000 copies by March 2004, and by June 2004 it had sold over a million copies on the RED Ink label, which led Columbia records to move the album to the Sony Music label. It reached its peak of number 16 on the Billboard 200 in July 2004 and by October 2004 it had sold another 500,000 copies on the Sony Music label. According to Billboard, The Beautiful Letdown ranked as the 40th-best selling album of 2004 and the bestselling Christian album of 2004. In 2005, it ranked as the 98th-best selling album and the second-best selling Christian album. The Beautiful Letdown would ultimately spend 118 weeks on the Billboard 200, the tenth-longest run on the chart of the 2000s.

As of January 2007, The Beautiful Letdown had sold 2.6 million copies in the United States, and it has sold 2.7 million copies as of 2013. It ranked as the 198th-best selling album of the 2000s in the United States and the second-best selling Christian album of the 2000s, behind only P.O.D.'s Satellite. The album has been certified triple platinum by the Recording Industry Association of America (RIAA), signifying shipments of over three million copies in the United States, and it has been certified gold by Music Canada, indicating shipments of 50,000 copies. As of September 2023, the album has sold over three million copies.

=== Reissues ===
A special edition version of The Beautiful Letdown featuring a bonus DVD was released in June 2004. The DVD included a music video for "Dare You to Move", a featurette on the making of the music video, an acoustic performance of "On Fire", and excerpts from the band's Switchfootage DVD, as well as two audio tracks: "Monday Comes Around", a song which was included on early promotional copies of the album but was ultimately excluded from the commercial release, and a live performance of "Meant to Live". The album was released on DualDisc in January 2005, with the DVD side featuring the entire album in 5.1 surround sound as well as additional video content.

The Beautiful Letdown received a hybrid Super Audio CD release in December 2005 and a digital "Deluxe Edition" of the album was released in 2007 featuring "Monday Comes Around" and as well as an alternate version of "Dare You to Move" and an acoustic version of "Meant to Live". The album was released on vinyl for the first time in December 2014.

On May 5, 2023, the band released The Beautiful Letdown (Our Version), a re-recorded version of the album. A deluxe edition, released on September 15, 2023, includes contributions from Relient K, Owl City, Ryan Tedder, Sleeping at Last, Noah Gundersen, Ingrid Andress, Jon Bellion, Jonas Brothers, Tyler Joseph, and others.

On August 30, 2024, the band released a live version of The Beautiful Letdown recorded at the Los Angeles show during the 20th anniversary tour.

== Track listing ==
Album release
No.	Title	Writer(s)	Length
1.	"Meant to Live"	Jon Foreman; Tim Foreman	3:21
2.	"This Is Your Life"	J. Foreman	4:19
3.	"More Than Fine"	J. Foreman	4:17
4.	"Ammunition"	J. Foreman	3:47
5.	"Dare You to Move"	J. Foreman	4:10
6.	"Redemption"	J. Foreman	3:09
7.	"The Beautiful Letdown"	J. Foreman	5:22
8.	"Gone"	J. Foreman; T. Foreman	3:47
9.	"On Fire"	J. Foreman; Daniel Victor	4:42
10.	"Adding to the Noise"	J. Foreman; T. Foreman	2:53
11.	"Twenty-Four"	J. Foreman	4:54

== Personnel ==
(Credits from the album liner notes)

Switchfoot

- Chad Butler
- Jerome Fontamillas
- Jon Foreman
- Tim Foreman

Additional musicians

- John Fields – keyboard, FX, percussion, tasty bits
- Stephan Hovsepian – violin
- Ameena Khawaja – cello

Technical and miscellaneous

- Mike Buzbee – computers
- Dorian Crozier – computers
- Erin Familia – assistant
- John Fields – production, recording, mixing
- Chris Lord-Alge – mixing ("Meant to Live)
- Tom Lord-Alge – mixing ("This Is Your Life", "Dare You to Move")
- Charlie Peacock – production ("Dare You to Move")
- Jack Joseph Puig – mixing ("More Than Fine", "The Beautiful Letdown", "On Fire")
- Aaron Redfield – drum tech
- Ted Reiger – assistant
- Switchfoot – production, remix ("Dare You to Move")

== Charts ==
=== Weekly ===
Weekly album charts
Chart (2003–2005)	Peak position
Australian Albums (ARIA)	45
US Billboard 200	16
US Top Catalog Albums (Billboard)	7
US Top Christian Albums (Billboard)	1

=== Decade-end ===
Decade-end album charts
Chart (2000s)	Position
US Billboard 200	195
US Christian Albums (Billboard)	2

=== Year-end ===
Year-end album charts
Chart (2003)	Position
US Christian Albums (Billboard)	11
Chart (2004)	Position
US Billboard 200	40
US Christian Albums (Billboard)	1
Chart (2005)	Position
US Billboard 200	94
US Christian Albums (Billboard)	2

== Certifications ==
Region	Certification	Certified units/sales
Canada (Music Canada)	Gold	50,000^{^}
United States (RIAA)	3× Platinum	3,000,000
^{^} Shipments figures based on certification alone.
