= Dare You to Move =

2004 song by Switchfoot

Single by Switchfoot

from the album Learning to Breathe, A Walk to Remember soundtrack and The Beautiful Letdown
- Released: February 6, 2004
- Genre: Alternative rock; post-grunge
- Length: 4:07 (2000 album version); 4:09 (2003 album version); 4:05 (alternative rock radio edit)
- Label: Columbia; Sony BMG
- Songwriter: Jon Foreman
- Producers: Charlie Peacock; John Fields

Switchfoot singles chronology
"Ammunition" (2003)	"Dare You to Move" (2004)	"This Is Your Life" (2004)

Audio sample
- file; help

"Dare You to Move" is a song by American alternative rock band Switchfoot from their fourth studio album, The Beautiful Letdown (2003). The song was originally called "I Dare You to Move", and was on the 2000 album Learning to Breathe, but the band decided to reimagine it and put it on The Beautiful Letdown. This track received considerable radio airplay, and its accompanying music videos saw play on MTV, VH1, Fuse, and other mainstream channels. "Dare You to Move" was released to Christian radio on February 6, 2004, and sent to modern rock radio the following month. It peaked at number 17 on the US Billboard Hot 100, becoming Switchfoot's highest charting single and second top-20 single, surpassing the success of their breakthrough single, "Meant to Live", in the United States.

Appearing as the first track on Learning to Breathe and the fifth track on The Beautiful Letdown, "Dare You to Move" was a long-lasting hit and eventually certified gold by the Recording Industry Association of America (RIAA) in April 2005. The song received positive reviews from critics, and was ranked number 73 on Rhapsody's list of the Top 100 Tracks of the Decade. "Dare You to Move" was co-produced by Charlie Peacock—who discovered Switchfoot and signed the band to its first record deal—and John Fields.

== Song history ==
Written by Switchfoot singer and songwriter Jon Foreman, "Dare You to Move" was originally produced solely by Charlie Peacock and recorded as the opening track for Switchfoot's 2000 album Learning to Breathe, and also appeared on the 2002 A Walk to Remember soundtrack, which featured several other Switchfoot songs. The song can be heard in various episodes of the series One Tree Hill including season one, episode eight "The Search for Something More" in 2003, season two, episode five "I Will Dare" in 2004, and season eight, episode eighteen "Quiet Little Voices" in 2011 as well as the documentary Warren Miller's Higher Ground.

Bassist Tim Foreman remarked that upon finishing the song, all the band members knew that they had really created something powerful. Jon Foreman said that sometimes the song could still can move him to tears, and that he was glad it got a second chance with its inclusion on The Beautiful Letdown in 2003. The reason the band gave it a rewrite was "that song hadn't lived its shelf life yet". In addition, "after having played it a couple years live, I feel like we've got a better grip of how we want it to be on a record," he said.

Foreman has called it "a defining song" for the band: "It's me talking to myself and I think a lot of times I feel stagnant and stuck in the same place, and 'Dare You to Move' is kind of a song for myself to get me up and get me moving and tackling a new part of life."

== Musical structure ==
The tune is played in the key of E major, beginning with a jangling strummed guitar riff and a driving rocky chorus. The song has a basic structure consisting of an intro, verse, chorus, verse, chorus, bridge, chorus. Multiple versions were released, varying slightly in dynamics and instrumental structure.

== Music videos ==
There are two official music videos: One depicts a man running against a large crowd of people while the other features a surfer who is being resuscitated on the beach while different parts of his life are shown. The second version of the video peaked at No. 2 on the VH1 Top 20 Video Countdown.

== Awards ==
In 2005, the track won two GMA Dove Awards: Rock/Contemporary Recorded Song of the Year and Short Form Music Video of the Year, at the 36th GMA Dove Awards. It was also nominated for Song of the Year.

== Track listings ==
Australian and New Zealand CD single

1. "Dare You to Move"
2. "Monday Comes Around"
3. "Meant to Live" (live)

UK CD1

1. "Dare You to Move"
2. "The Beautiful Letdown" (live)

UK CD2

1. "Dare You to Move" (album version)
2. "On Fire" (live)
3. "Gone" (live)
4. "Dare You to Move" (CD-ROM video)

== Charts ==
=== Weekly charts ===
Weekly chart performance for "Dare You to Move"
Chart (2004–2005)	Peak position
Australia (ARIA)	35
Canada Rock Top 30 (Radio & Records)	27
Scottish Singles Sales (Official Charts)	80
UK Physical Singles (OCC)	84
US Billboard Hot 100	17
US Adult Pop Airplay (Billboard)	6
US Adult Contemporary (Billboard)	38
US Alternative Airplay (Billboard)	9
US Hot Christian Songs (Billboard)	37
US Pop Airplay (Billboard)	6
US Top 40 Tracks (Billboard)	8

=== Year-end charts ===
2004 year-end chart performance for "Dare You to Move"
Chart (2004)	Position
US Adult Top 40 (Billboard)	59
US Mainstream Top 40 (Billboard)	66
US Modern Rock Tracks (Billboard)	42

2005 year-end chart performance for "Dare You to Move"
Chart (2005)	Position
US Adult Top 40 (Billboard)	19
US Mainstream Top 40 (Billboard)	62

== Certifications ==
Certifications and sales for "Dare You to Move"
Region	Certification	Certified units/sales
United States (RIAA)	Gold	500,000^{*}
^{*} Sales figures based on certification alone.

== Release history ==
Release dates and formats for "Dare You to Move"
Region	Date	Format(s)	Label(s)	Ref.
United States	February 6, 2004	Christian radio	Columbia	
United States	March 1, 2004	Modern rock radio	Columbia	
Australia	December 27, 2004	CD	Columbia	
United Kingdom	July 18, 2005	CD	Sony BMG	

== Song versions ==
"Dare You to Move" has six recorded versions that have appeared on soundtracks, CDs, and singles:

- The Learning to Breathe version, which was released in 2000. It is characterized by quieter, less driven instrumentation. It also appears on A Walk to Remember soundtrack single.
- The Beautiful Letdown album version, which was released in 2003. It featured a brand new mix of the song (heavier electric guitars) and stronger vocals from Jon Foreman, ultimately resulting in a more complete and emphatic ending. Also, the title was changed to "Dare You to Move", dropping the "I" from the original title.
- A finalized radio-edit remix done in 2004, which slightly tweaked the Beautiful Letdown album version to allow for heavier drum and electric guitar accompaniment throughout the entire song. This is the version which has been featured on most alternative rock music stations while the original The Beautiful Letdown album version was featured on top 40 and Hot AC music stations. It is also the same version that is heard in the first version music video for this song. In 2007, it was made available for purchase on the iTunes-exclusive deluxe edition of The Beautiful Letdown.
- There is also a live version of the song on the 2004 exclusive iTunes EP – Live EP, which was recorded in San Diego.
- The Japanese version of the 2005 album Nothing Is Sound has an alternate version, which is longer than the original, and features different instrumentation and arrangements from the previous versions.
- "Dare You To Move (Our Version)" featuring Ryan Tedder is a re-recording of the original Switchfoot song, "Dare You to Move," released as part of the album 2023 The Beautiful Letdown (Our Version) to celebrate the album's 20th anniversary. In this version, Ryan Tedder of OneRepublic sings a duet with Switchfoot's lead singer, Jon Foreman, offering a new interpretation of the popular track.
