= Future of Forestry =

American indie rock band

- Origin: San Diego, California, U.S.
- Genres: Alternative; indie; ambient rock; experimental rock; post-rock
- Years active: 2006–present
- Labels: Credential Recordings, Sound Swan
- Members: Eric Owyoung
- Website: futureofforestry.com

Future of Forestry is an American indie rock band from Southern California, United States.

== History ==
Future of Forestry is led by multi-instrumentalist, composer, and producer Eric Owyoung. The name comes from a poem by C.S. Lewis, "The Future of Forestry". Owyoung formed the project in 2006 as his previous band, Something Like Silas, was ending; the first Future of Forestry lineup matched that band's final lineup, and Owyoung later became the project's only constant member. The project is currently based in Colorado.

The band started in 2006 and released its self-titled debut EP in 2006 under Credential Recordings (EMI). Their first full-length album, Twilight, appeared in 2007, but for the next several years, Owyoung and his collaborators focused on a series of EPs, the Travel series, with three volumes released between 2009 and 2010. The third volume, Travel III, was nominated for Rock Album of the Year at the 2011 GMA Dove Awards. Author Moses Mikheyev has named the Travel II track "Slow Your Breath Down" as a theme song for Lilyanne, a central character in his science fiction novel Vanishing Bodies.

Another EP series, Advent, devoted to Advent-themed music, debuted in 2008, with additional installments appearing in 2010 and 2013. In 2011, the Travel series was collected on a single album, The Complete Travel Series, while the same year, the group issued another compilation, A Film and TV Collection, a limited-edition sampler of music Owyoung created for visual media.

For the 2012 album, Young Man Follow, Owyoung launched his own label, Sound Swan Records. He also opened his own studio, Utopia Road Studios, where he worked on Future of Forestry projects as well as recording and mixing work for other artists.

The following years yielded a 2014 release of the Piano & Strings Sessions, an EP of rearranged Future of Forestry songs orchestrated for piano, strings, and vocals only. In April 2015 an acoustic duet album called "Pages" was released as a surprise to fans on Future of Forestry's website and on iTunes. Pages was then later released on vinyl as the band's first vinyl pressing.

In 2016 the band released Awakened to the Sound, and then Union two years later. Union (2018) is an entirely instrumental album of orchestral soundscapes built around the cello, played by Katie Burns, principal cellist of the Denver Philharmonic; Owyoung has said its theme is union with God, and that these instrumental pieces were conceived around the instruments from the beginning rather than built around a vocal.

A Christmas album, Light Has Come: Christmas, followed on November 14, 2019, on Sound Swan Records, mixing original songs with traditional carols. Together with his earlier Advent releases, collected as The Advent Anthology (2015), the album was ranked first in The Gospel Coalition's list of the ten best Advent albums of the 2010s, which called the body of work "some of the decade's best Christmas music." The next studio album, Remember, was released on May 28, 2021, after a rollout in which one song was released each week beginning with "Turn Your Heart."

=== Film and television work ===
Owyoung's music has been placed in a number of television programs and films; his official biography lists, among others, Grey's Anatomy, 90210, One Tree Hill, Oprah's Big Give and Wildfire. He composed the score for the Lee Strobel documentary film The Case for Miracles, released in theaters by Fathom Entertainment in December 2025, and his music was also used in the earlier Strobel film The Case for Heaven (2022). His releases in recent years have been predominantly instrumental, including the live EP Symphonic Christmas (Live) (2024) and the score album The Case for Miracles (Original Score) (2026), issued under the joint credit "Eric Owyoung & Future of Forestry."

== Musical style ==
AllMusic biographer Mark Deming describes Future of Forestry as a Christian indie rock project combining "a sincere, literate, spiritual message with low-key ambient music featuring acoustic and electronic elements." Reviewing the debut album Twilight, Jesus Freak Hideout heard a melancholic mix of modern praise music and indie rock built on piano, synthesizer, and distorted guitars. Later records moved toward orchestral and cinematic arrangements; reviewing Remember (2021), Jesus Freak Hideout pointed to anthemic passages built on tight string sections and big drums.

== Sound Swan Records ==
Future of Forestry has released much of their own music on Sound Swan.

Owyoung has also mixed, performed and attributed production work for former label mate, Jon Foreman's Sunlight, Shadows, Darkness and Dawn, remixes for Hillsong United's "Like an Avalanche", and Hillsong Young & Free's Heart of God. and helping produce Collington's EP In Between.

== Members ==
Current

- Eric Owyoung – vocals, instruments

Former

- Luke Floeter – bass, keyboards
- TJ Hill – drums, percussion, vocals, trombone, guitar, vibraphone, organ, glockenspiel
- Logan Snell - drums
- Spencer Kim – drums
- Nick Maybury – vocals, guitar, keyboards

== Discography ==
Studio albums

- 2007: Twilight – Credential Recordings
- 2011: A Film & TV Collection – Credential Recordings
- 2011: The Complete Travel Series - Rethink Records
- 2012: Young Man Follow - Sound Swan Records
- 2015: Pages - Sound Swan Records
- 2015: The Advent Anthology
- 2016: Awakened to the Sound - Sound Swan Records
- 2018: Union - Sound Swan Records
- 2021: Remember - Sound Swan Records
- 2026: The Case for Miracles (Original Score) (as Eric Owyoung & Future of Forestry)

EPs

- 2006: Future of Forestry – Credential Recordings
- 2008: Advent: Christmas EP – Credential Recordings
- 2009: Travel EP – Credential Recordings
- 2009: Travel II EP – Credential Recordings
- 2010: Travel III EP – Credential Recordings
- 2010: Advent: Christmas EP Volume 2 – Credential Recordings
- 2013: Advent: Christmas EP Volume 3 – Credential Recordings
- 2014: The Piano and Strings Sessions - Instrumentals EP – Sound Swan Records
- 2019: Light Has Come: Christmas - Sound Swan Records
- 2024: Symphonic Christmas (Live)

Singles

- "Open Wide"

Compilation appearances

- 2006: Stereocilia Vol. 1 – Credential Recordings
- 2006: X 2007 – Provident/Word/EMI
- 2006: X 2007 – Provident/Word/EMI
- 2007: The Tour EP – Credential Recordings
