= Spring (Jon Foreman EP) =

EP by Jon Foreman
- Released: March 25, 2008
- Recorded: 2007/2008
- Genre: Acoustic
- Length: 20:30
- Label: Lowercase people, Credential
- Producer: Charlie Peacock, Jon Foreman

Jon Foreman chronology
Winter (2008)	Spring (2008)	Summer (2008)

Alternative covers
- The Spring & Summer Compilation Cover

Professional ratings
Review scores
Source	Rating
AbsolutePunk.net	89%
The Album Project	4/5 stars
AllMusic	4/5 stars
Jesus Freak Hideout	3.5/5 stars

Spring is the third in a comprehensive four-EP collection released by Jon Foreman, the singer/songwriter of the San Diego rock band Switchfoot. It was released as a digital download on Tuesday, March 25, 2008, peaking at No. 14 on Billboard's Top Digital Albums chart and No. 179 on the Comprehensive Album Chart.

== Sound ==
Spring carries a new sound from the previous two Foreman EPs, Fall and Winter, which were more melancholy in nature. "Spring" is rooted in more upbeat, hopeful tones. "March", an upbeat and jumpy song, sets the tone for the rest of the EP, which captures and corresponds with the "rebirth" and "new life" themes that are commonly associated with the season.

== Track listing ==
All tracks are written by Jon Foreman

No.	Title	Length
1.	"March (A Prelude to Spring)"	1:23
2.	"Love Isn't Made"	4:19
3.	"In My Arms"	2:50
4.	"Baptize My Mind"	3:17
5.	"Your Love Is Strong"	5:09
6.	"Revenge"	4:32

=== Notes ===
- A different version of "Revenge" originally was considered for inclusion in Switchfoot's sixth studio album, Oh! Gravity., and appeared as a bonus track on some versions of that album.

== Personnel ==
- Jon Foreman – lead vocals, guitar
- Molly Jenson – background vocals on "March"
- Sarah Masen – background vocal on "Love Isn't Made"
- Emily Foreman – "Love Isn't Made" on "Love Isn't Made"
- Karl Denson – flute on "Baptize My Mind"
- Keith Tutt II – cello (all tracks)
