= Your Love Is Strong =

Single by Jon Foreman

from the album Spring and Limbs and Branches
- Released: March 25, 2008
- Recorded: 2008
- Genre: Acoustic
- Length: 5:09
- Label: Lowercase people records/Credential Recordings
- Songwriter(s): Jon Foreman
- Producer(s): Charlie Peacock

Jon Foreman singles chronology
"The Cure for Pain" (2007)	"Your Love Is Strong" (2008)

"Your Love Is Strong" is a single from singer/songwriter Jon Foreman's Spring EP, as well as his first full album, the compilation entitled Limbs and Branches. It was confirmed as a radio single by EMI/CMG's promotion blog and was released to Christian radio formats only. Robbie Seay Band recorded a version of this song for their 2010 release Miracle.

It entered the Christian CHR radio chart at No. 29, and has thus far peaked at No. 18.

The song's lyrics consist of a blend of the Lord's Prayer and a loose translation of Psalm 62:11-12, "One thing God has spoken, two things I have heard: “Power belongs to you, God, and with you, Lord, is unfailing love.” Foreman riffs this Psalm into the lyrics "two things you told me/You are strong and you love me." Other references include Matthew 6:9-14 (Lord's Prayer); Matthew 6:25-34 (Do Not Worry); Matthew 13:44 (Hidden Treasure).

== Versions ==
There are two versions of the song. The first is the original version that appears on the Spring EP. The second appears on the Limbs and Branches compilation and has a slightly different arrangement, most notably including some additional overdubbed strings throughout the entire song, albeit low in the mix.
