= This Is Our Christmas Album =

2022 holiday album by Switchfoot

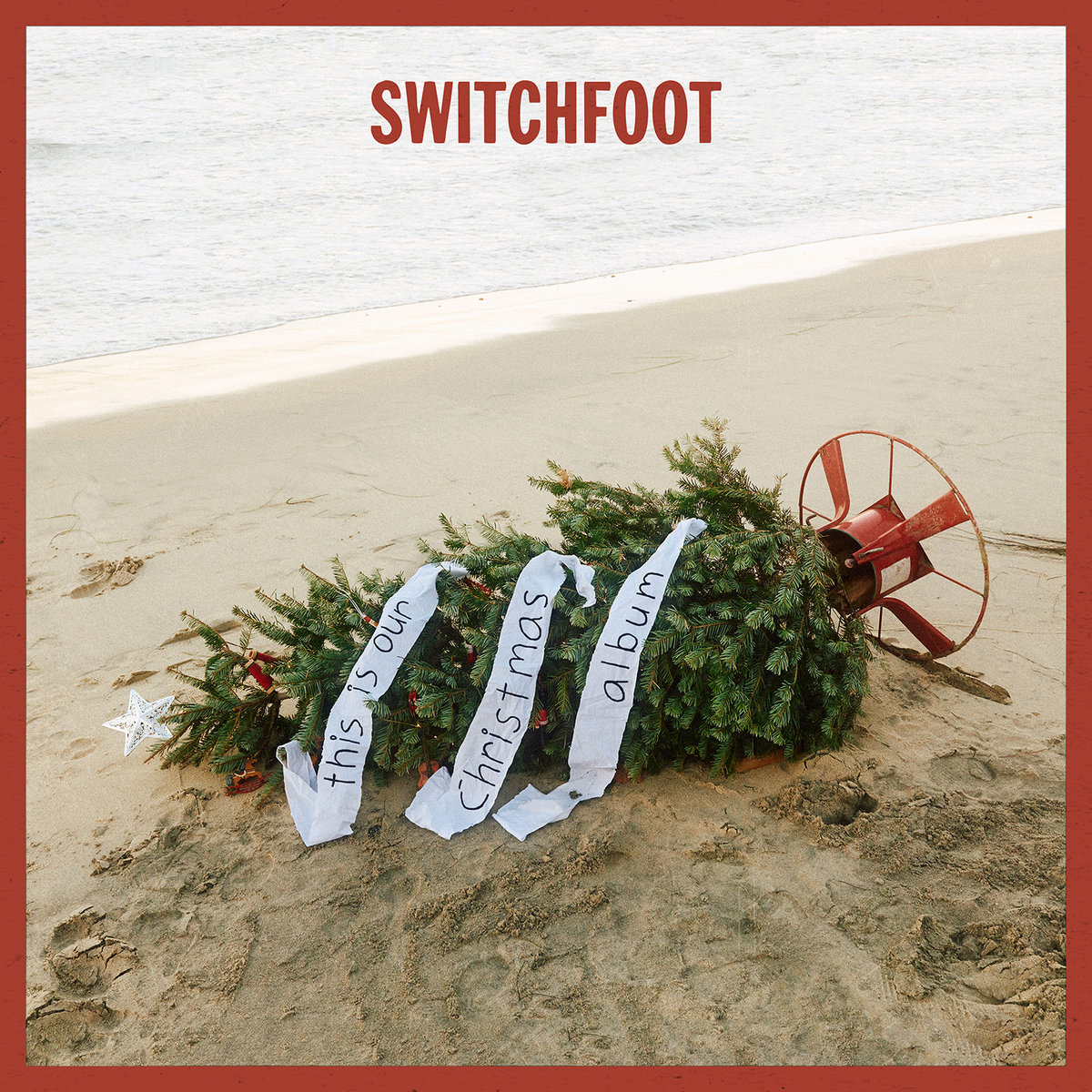

Studio album by Switchfoot
- Released: November 4, 2022
- Recorded: 2022
- Length: 39:43
- Label: Lowercase People Records

Switchfoot chronology
| interrobang (2021) | This Is Our Christmas Album (2022) | The Beautiful Letdown (Our Version) (2023) |

Singles from This Is Our Christmas Album
- 1. "California Christmas" Released: October 14, 2022

Professional ratings
Review scores
| Source | Rating |
|---|---|
| Jesusfreakhideout | 3.5/5 stars |

This Is Our Christmas Album (stylized as this is our Christmas album) is the thirteenth studio album and first Christmas-themed release by the American alternative rock band Switchfoot. It was released on November 4, 2022, through Lowercase People Records, featuring a combination of original and covers of classic Christmas songs.

== Track listing ==
All tracks are written by Tim and Jon Foreman, except where noted.

| No. | Title | Length |
|---|---|---|
| 1. | "California Christmas" | 4:34 |
| 2. | "Looking For Christmas" | 4:12 |
| 3. | "Christmas Time Is Here" | 2:46 |
| 4. | "Scrappy Little Christmas Tree" | 2:12 |
| 5. | "Silent Night / It Came Upon a Midnight Clear" | 3:24 |
| 6. | "I Heard the Bells on Christmas Day" | 3:20 |
| 7. | "Midlife Christmas" | 3:25 |
| 8. | "Interlude (Everybody Knows a Turkey)" | 0:37 |
| 9. | "The Christmas Song" | 3:57 |
| 10. | "New Year's Day" | 3:35 |
| 11. | "O Little Town of Bethlehem" | 3:30 |
| 12. | "Hometown Christmas" (with Needtobreathe and Judah & the Lion) | 4:12 |
| Total length: | | 39:43 |

== Charts ==
Weekly chart performance for This is Our Christmas Album
| Chart (2022) | Peak position |
|---|---|
| US Top Christian Albums (Billboard) | 43 |
| US Top Holiday Albums (Billboard) | 44 |
