= The Cure for Pain =

"The Cure For Pain"

Single by Jon Foreman

from the album Fall
- Released: December 10, 2007
- Recorded: 2007
- Genre: Acoustic
- Length: 4:45
- Label: Lowercase people records/Credential Recordings
- Songwriter: Jon Foreman
- Producer: Charlie Peacock

Jon Foreman singles chronology
"The Cure For Pain" (2007)	"Your Love Is Strong" (2008)

"The Cure For Pain" is the first single from singer/songwriter Jon Foreman's debut solo EP, Fall. It was released Monday, December 10, 2007 as a free download on popular networking site Myspace's homepage.

confirmed it as a single.

== Song story ==
About "The Cure for Pain," Foreman said, "I wrote this one in Texas on a day off. I was reflecting on the passing of time. I have been playing music in Switchfoot for about ten years. During that period, I have been fighting pain or running away from it in a myriad of ways. And yet the pain is a constant. I have had some amazing moments singing gravity away but the water keeps on falling. I began to think of the suffering I see around me, I think of the pain of a grandmother dying of cancer. Of a friend killed by a train. I think of the pain of death, of failure, of rejection, the pain of a father losing his only son. And I came to the conclusion that I cannot run from pain any longer."

== In pop culture ==
This song appeared on the 17th episode of Season 4 of the TV show Grey's Anatomy.
