= Fiction Family (album) =

Studio album by Fiction Family
- Released: January 20, 2009
- Recorded: 2006–2007
- Genres: Acoustic; folk-pop; roots rock
- Length: 39:42
- Labels: ATO; Credential Recordings; lowercase people
- Producers: Jon Foreman; Sean Watkins

Fiction Family chronology
Fiction Family (2009)	Holiday EP (2012)

Singles from Fiction Family
- 1. "When She's Near" Released: 2008

Fiction Family is the debut studio album by the Fiction Family band collaboration between Switchfoot frontman and solo artist Jon Foreman and Nickel Creek guitarist and solo artist Sean Watkins. It was released January 20, 2009 through the indie record label, ATO Records.

== Production ==
=== History and recording ===
Foreman and Watkins began their collaboration in 2005, and eventually pieced together their first song called "Betrayal". The pair continued to write songs in the same manner because Nickel Creek and Switchfoot were both constantly on the road touring. "Whoever was home from tour would chip away at the songs with no real expectations at all," said Foreman. It was "mainly just for ourselves and for the love of the song I suppose."

The tracking of the record was very organic, with little production involved besides some basic samples the two created from scratch. It was recorded completely in Foreman and Watkins' home studios, and with a few exceptions, "every note was written, arranged, played, recorded, mixed, and mastered by Sean and myself," Foreman said.

"A lot of our sessions consisted of playing new songs that we'd written or songs that we'd learned and then saying, 'That's really good' or 'I don't really like that one' or 'I like the chorus on that one, but maybe we could write a new verse,'" said Watkins about the experience of writing with Foreman.

=== Music and lyrical content ===
Watkins and Foreman's writing methods were varied, but most of the time, Watkins would come up with a melody and Foreman would write the lyrics. "There’s a few songs where I just gave him the melody idea and he wrote all the words over it," said Watkins. "A couple times, there were some lyrical collaborations but it was more about what sounded better and less about content."

Regardless of contribution, the credits for the writing of all original songs were split between Foreman and Watkins evenly. Songwriting credits are listed neither in the liner notes nor on any website.

The album also contains a cover of "Throw It Away", written by singer Abbey Lincoln. "On that one, he'd (Foreman) learned it and I hadn't heard the original one yet at all," said Watkins of their recording process for the song. "He played it and I thought it was great, just a good song with a great arrangement. We added a couple things to it and used it."

The pair switched roles between the songwriter and the producer throughout the project. "The second song we did together, called 'Out of Order,' (Sean) pretty much wrote on his own and I provided more of the producer role," Foreman says. "When one of us was producing the song, it allowed the other to dive more into the artistic elements of the song."

== Distribution ==
Eventually, the pair had pulled together enough songs for an EP, but enjoyed the project so much they decided to continue writing until they had a full record. They finished tracking in 2007, and rumors were swirling that Starbucks Coffee would be releasing the record on their label. But that deal apparently fell through, and the album was shelved until ATO Records picked it up late in 2008.

== Reception ==
=== Critical reception ===
Professional ratings
Aggregate scores
Source	Rating
Metacritic	50/100
Review scores
Source	Rating
AllMusic	3/5 stars
Christianity Today	3.5/5 stars
Indie Vision Music	
Jesus Freak Hideout	Josh Taylor: Adam Dawson:
Paste	6.4/10
PopMatters	2/10 discs
Slant Magazine	3/5 stars
USA Today	2.5/4 stars

The album has been well received amongst many review publications. Relevant called the project "wildly inventive and spontaneous... the work stands in victorious defiance against a crumbling conventional music industry." Jesus Freak Hideout praised the diversity of the record, saying "each song is meticulously crafted, and strikingly different from the eleven other songs on the record." Silent Sound Waves likened Foreman's and Watkins' efforts to what "put The Beatles and The Eagles on the map."

=== Sales and charts ===
The album entered the Billboard 200 at number 71, selling 7000 copies in the first week of its release. It was well received at online retail sites, as well, reaching as high as No. 5 on iTunes' top overall albums on its first day of release.

== Versions ==
Orders of the album from the band's online store come in three different options: Deluxe Edition, Vinyl, and CD.

=== Deluxe edition ===
The Deluxe Edition, which was limited to only 500 orders, comes with the album CD, as well as the following:

- Autographs by Watkins and Foreman
- Vinyl album
- DVD
- Bonus 3-song EP
- Limited edition Fictional Family print.
- Printable Holiday Card

== Track listing ==
All tracks are written by Jon Foreman and Sean Watkins, except where noted.

No.	Title	Writer(s)	Length
1.	"When She's Near"		2:55
2.	"Out of Order"	Watkins	3:31
3.	"Not Sure"	Watkins	3:06
4.	"Betrayal"		3:03
5.	"Elements Combined"	Watkins	3:38
6.	"War in My Blood"	Foreman	2:57
7.	"Throw It Away"	Abbey Lincoln	4:14
8.	"Closer Than You Think"		3:12
9.	"Please Don't Call It Love"		5:11
10.	"Mostly Prove Me Wrong"	Foreman	3:02
11.	"We Ride"	Foreman	3:18
12.	"Look for Me Baby"	Foreman	1:35

iTunes deluxe edition bonus tracks
No.	Title	Writer(s)	Length
13.	"Friday I'm in Love" (The Cure cover)	Perry Bamonte; Boris Williams; Simon Gallup; Robert Smith; Porl Thompson	3:30
14.	"Resurrect Me"	Foreman	4:07
15.	"No Other Needs"	Watkins	2:50

== Charts ==
Chart (2009)	Peak position
Billboard 200	71
Billboard Top Modern Rock/Alternative Albums	20
Billboard Comprehensive Albums	73
Billboard Top Rock Albums	25
Billboard Top Internet Albums	14
Billboard Top Independent Albums	8
Billboard Top Digital Albums	14
Billboard Top Christian Albums	3
