= Limbs and Branches =

Compilation album by Jon Foreman
- Released: October 28, 2008
- Recorded: 2007–2008
- Genre: Folk, acoustic rock
- Length: 49:53
- Label: Lowercase people
- Producer: Jon Foreman

Jon Foreman chronology
Summer (2008)	Limbs and Branches (2008)	Sunlight (2015)

Singles from Limbs and Branches
- 1. "Your Love Is Strong" Released: 2008

Professional ratings
Review scores
Source	Rating
AllMusic	4/5 stars
Jesus Freak Hideout	4/5 stars

Limbs and Branches is a compilation release from singer/songwriter Jon Foreman that was released October 28, 2008. It consists of a selection of songs from Foreman's previous solo EP releases, handpicked by Foreman and his fans, who were given a chance to vote for which songs to be included. Foreman also recorded two new songs for the release. "It's for all the folks that have a hard time understanding EP's and want things in a more universal format," explained Foreman.

It has peaked at No. 48 on the iTunes overall albums chart.

== Track listing ==
1. "Your Love Is Strong" (Spring)
2. "Behind Your Eyes" (Winter)
3. "The Cure for Pain" (Fall)
4. "Resurrect Me" (Summer)
5. "Southbound Train" (Fall)
6. "Broken from the Start" (New Song)
7. "The House of God, Forever" (Summer)
8. "Instead of a Show" (Summer)
9. "A Mirror Is Harder to Hold" (Summer)
10. "In My Arms" (Spring)
11. "Learning How to Die" (Winter)
12. "Over the River" (New Song)
