= List of awards and nominations received by Switchfoot =

Switchfoot awards and nominations
Awards and nominations
Award	Wins	Nominations
Grammy	1	2
ASCAP Awards	3	0
GMA Dove Award	14	5
San Diego Music Awards	12	1
Orville H. Gibson Guitar Awards	1	0
Rock on Request Awards	1	0

Totals (Note: Certain award groups do not simply award one winner. They acknowledge several different recipients, have runners-up, and have third place. Since this is a specific recognition and is different from losing an award, runner-up mentions are considered wins in this award tally. For simplification and to avoid errors, each award in this list has been presumed to have had a prior nomination.)
- Wins: 31
- Nominations: 4

The following is a list of awards and nominations received by Switchfoot, an American alternative rock band.

== ASCAP Awards ==
American Society of Composers, Authors and Publishers (ASCAP) honors its top members through a series of annual awards shows across seven distinct music categories: pop, rhythm and soul, film and television, Latin, country, Christian, and concert music.

Year	Nominee / work	Award	Result
1997	Switchfoot	Best New Artist	Won
2006	Jon Foreman	Impact Award awarded "to celebrate the success and influence of his songs in mainstream rock music"	Won
2006	"Dare You to Move"	Top 50 list of Most Performed Song of 2005	Won

== GMA Dove Awards ==
GMA Dove Award is an accolade by the Gospel Music Association (GMA) of the United States to recognize outstanding achievement in the Christian music industry.

Year	Nominee / work	Award	Result
2004	"Ammunition"	Rock Recorded Song of the Year	Won
2004	The Beautiful Letdown	Rock/Contemporary Album of the Year	Won
2004	"Meant to Live"	Rock/Contemporary Recorded Song of the Year	Won
2005	Switchfoot	Artist of the Year	Won
2005	"Dare You to Move"	Rock/Contemporary Recorded Song of the Year	Won
2005	"Dare You to Move"	Short Form Music Video of the Year	Won
2005	Live In San Diego	Long Form Music Video of the Year	Won
2006	"Stars"	Short Form Music Video of the Year	Won
2010	"Mess of Me"	Rock Recorded Song of the Year	Won
2012	"Dark Horses"	Rock Recorded Song of the Year	Won
2012	Vice Verses	Rock Album of the Year	Won
2013	"Afterlife"	Rock/Contemporary Recorded Song of the Year	Nominated
2014	Switchfoot	Artist of the Year	Nominated
2014	"Love Alone Is Worth the Fight"	Rock/Contemporary Song of the Year	Won
2014	Fading West	Rock/Contemporary Album of the Year	Won
2019	"Native Tongue"	Rock/Contemporary Recorded Song of the Year	Nominated
2019	Native Tongue	Rock/Contemporary Album of the Year	Won
2019	Native Tongue	Recorded Music Packaging of the Year	Nominated
2022	Interrobang	Rock/Contemporary Album of the Year	Nominated

== Grammy Awards ==
The Grammy Awards are awarded annually by the National Academy of Recording Arts and Sciences to recognize outstanding achievement in the music industry. Switchfoot has received two Grammy nominations for their albums, and won once in 2011.

Year	Nominee / work	Award	Result
2001	Learning to Breathe	Best Rock Gospel Album	Nominated
2011	Hello Hurricane	Best Rock or Rap Gospel Album	Won

== Orville H. Gibson Guitar Awards ==
Year	Nominee / work	Award	Result
2001	Jon Foreman	Les Paul Horizon Award (for the most promising up-and-coming guitarist)	Won

== Rock on Request Awards ==
The Rock on Request Awards are an American annual music awards held by the music webzine Rock on Request.

Year	Nominee / work	Award	Result
2009	Switchfoot	Best Christian Artist	Won

== San Diego Music Awards ==
San Diego Music Awards are held annually in San Diego, California to recognize the best bands and artists in local music.

Year	Nominee / work	Award	Result
1997	Switchfoot	Best New Artist	Won
2001	Switchfoot	Best Pop Artist	Won
2001	Learning to Breathe	Best Pop Album	Won
2002	Switchfoot	Best Adult Alternative Artist	Won
2003	The Beautiful Letdown	Best Pop Album	Won
2003	The Beautiful Letdown	Album of the Year	Won
2004	"Dare You to Move"	Song of the Year	Won
2006	Switchfoot	Artist of the Year	Won
2007	Oh! Gravity	Album of the Year	Won
2010	Hello Hurricane	Album of the Year	Won
2011	Switchfoot	Artist of the Year	Won
2012	Switchfoot	Artist of the Year	Won
2012	"Afterlife"	Song of the Year	Nominated
