= Summer (Jon Foreman EP) =

EP by Jon Foreman
- Released: June 10, 2008
- Recorded: 2007/2008
- Genre: Acoustic
- Length: 23:03
- Label: lowercase people, Credential
- Producer: Charlie Peacock, Jon Foreman

Jon Foreman chronology
Spring (2008)	Summer (2008)	Limbs and Branches (2008)

Alternative covers
- The Spring & Summer Compilation Cover

Professional ratings
Review scores
Source	Rating
AbsolutePunk.net	87%
The Album Project	5/5 stars
AllMusic	4/5 stars
Christianity Today	4/5 stars
Jesus Freak Hideout	4/5 stars

Summer is the fourth and final installment in a comprehensive 4-EP acoustic collection released by Jon Foreman, the lead singer/songwriter of the San Diego rock band Switchfoot.

The EP was released on Tuesday, June 10, 2008 to iTunes and other online outlets. In an April 14, 2008 MySpace blog entry, Foreman announced the track listing for Summer.

Originally, the EP was scheduled for release on June 10, but was changed to May 27. Eventually, however, the digital EP was moved back to its original release date of June 10. The digital EP peaked at No. 9 on the overall iTunes albums chart, and No. 2 on the Rock albums chart. It debuted and peaked on the Billboard 200 at No. 162. The Spring and Summer Combo pack was released on June 24 to regular outlets.

== Track listing ==
All tracks are written by Jon Foreman.

No.	Title	Length
1.	"A Mirror Is Harder to Hold"	3:15
2.	"Resurrect Me"	4:05
3.	"Deep in Your Eyes (There Is a River)" (featuring Sarah Masen)	3:03
4.	"Instead of a Show"	4:03
5.	"The House of God, Forever" (featuring Sarah Masen)	4:44
6.	"Again"	3:54

== Sound ==
Summer, like Spring, is a departure from the somber tones of Fall or Winter. "Resurrect Me" is the biggest anomaly to the Foreman EP sound, featuring upbeat drum patterns, some electric guitar accompaniment, and even doubletracked vocals.
