= Winter (Jon Foreman EP) =

EP by Jon Foreman
- Released: January 15, 2008
- Recorded: 2007
- Genre: Acoustic
- Length: 22:43
- Labels: Lowercase people, Credential
- Producers: Charlie Peacock, Jon Foreman

Jon Foreman chronology
Fall (2007)	Winter (2008)	Spring (2008)

Alternative covers
- The Fall & Winter Compilation Cover

Alternative cover

Professional ratings
Review scores
Source	Rating
AbsolutePunk.net	89%
Allmusic	4.5/5 stars
Christianity Today	4.5/5 stars
Jesus Freak Hideout	4/5 stars
The Album Project	4/5 stars
PopMatters	7/10 stars
IGN	6.6/10
Patrol Magazine	5.9/10

Winter is the second EP released by Jon Foreman, frontman of the San Diego rock band Switchfoot. The EP was released on Tuesday, January 15, 2008, as either a digital download or as a physical copy packaged with the Fall EP in a double-disc set.

== Sound ==
Stylistically, this EP reflects a more experimental side to Foreman's songwriting. Whereas the Fall EP displayed a more straightforward approach musically, experimentation on Winter is much more evident. "White as Snow" toys with a slightly eastern influenced sound, while "In Love" carries a very oriental, and near-mantric feel—both new concepts in Foreman's music. The feel of the album is indeed much more 'wintry', reflecting the dead of wintertime.

== Commercial performance ==
The Fall & Winter CD combo debuted on the Billboard Top Heatseeker's chart at No. 24.

== In popculture ==
- "Behind Your Eyes" appeared in an episode of the TV Show, One Tree Hill

== Track listing ==
All tracks are written by Jon Foreman.

No.	Title	Length
1.	"Learning How to Die"	3:28
2.	"Behind Your Eyes"	2:28
3.	"Somebody's Baby"	4:30
4.	"White as Snow"	4:11
5.	"I Am Still Running"	3:19
6.	"In Love"	4:39
