= Collington (band) =

American Christian indie rock band

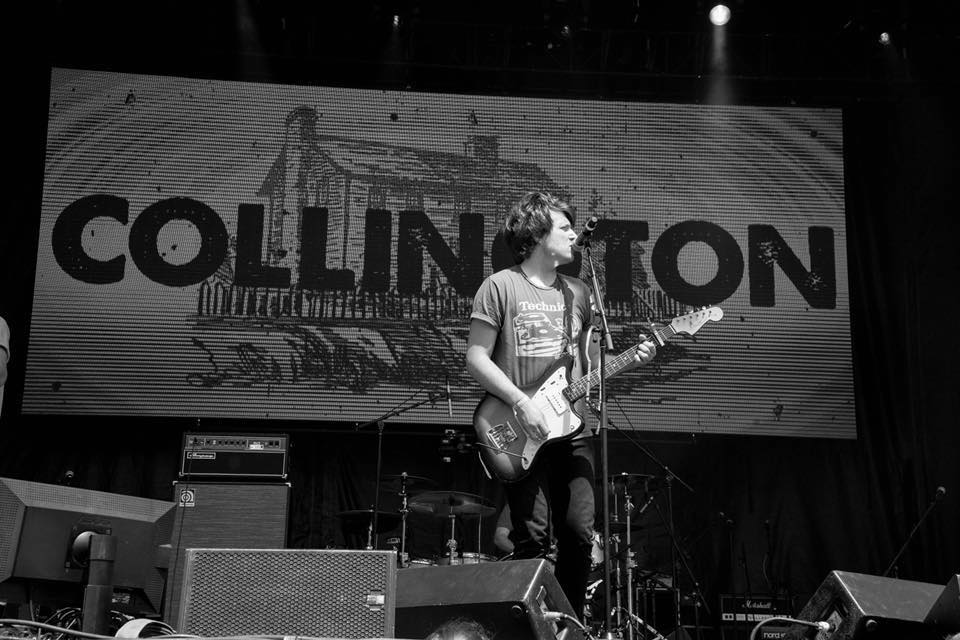
- Collington at SoulFest 2016

Background information
- Origin: Providence, Rhode Island, U.S.
- Genres: Indie rock; alternative rock; ambient rock
- Years active: 2010–present
- Members: James Collington
- Website: collingtonmusic.com

Collington is an indie rock, Christian rock, and worship band fronted by American singer-songwriter James Collington. The style of Collington ranges from more acoustic tracks to full out rock production, including alt rock, indie rock Christian rock, and worship. The band has released one full-length album We Swim In Seas That Never Rest (2016), and an EP In Between (2018) and various singles (2020& 2022)

== Career ==
Collington began writing in 2009 and made his first demos in 2010 with an overall acoustic sound. Soon after, he started playing shows and also producing his own music. In the summer of 2015, he opened for Aaron Gillespie (Underoath/Paramore), who was impressed and invited James to record with him. Gillespie produced Collington's debut album We Swim In Seas That Never Rest. The album premiered on Relevant magazine and was released on January 1, 2016. Collington has shared the stage with many popular artists including Switchfoot, Johnnyswim and Skillet and others.

For his next EP, In Between, Collington worked with producer Eric Owyoung (Switchfoot, Jon Foreman, Hillsong United). The record also received attention in the US and in the UK and was featured on many official Spotify playlists as well. "Here We Go" was the first single that was also featured on an official Spotify playlist. The follow-up was "Mountain" that was recorded with Dan Knittel at Anthemic Recordings.

All 2020 singles were recorded and self-produced in Maine at an Airbnb. "Against the Wall" became Collington's first single featured on major US radio after winning Battle of The Buzz at RadioU (WUFM). "Providence" another single in 2020 features Collington's wife. All 2022 singles were recorded with Jake Rye of Sanctus Real fame who also produced records for artists such as Newsboys, Michigander and Matt Moore. RadioU (WUFM) featured Collington as their first artist to drop a new single in 2023.

After listening to "Providence" with producer Bill Scheniman (Bruce Springsteen, Mick Jagger), Bill put his own spin on it, and that alternative version was released as a Patreon exclusive).

Collington were nominated for The We Love Christian Music Awards Next Big Thing in 2020 for its 9th annual awards event and won in the category of "The Next Big Thing". Even with no live audience allowed and only a few artists allowed to perform due to the COVID-19 pandemic, Collington was able to play live at the awards in Memphis, Tennessee and accept his award there in an event organized on February 24, 2021.

== Personal life ==
James Collington was born in Providence, Rhode Island and is now based in Sacramento, California. He went to Rhode Island College graduating with a degree in Business Management. It is there that he met his wife Megan. He is also a Creative Arts Director in Davis, CA.

== Discography ==
=== Albums ===
List of studio albums, with selected chart positions
Title	Album details	Peak chart positions		
Title	Album details	USChr	USHeat	USInd
We Swim In Seas That Never Rest	Released: January 1, 2016; Label: N/A; CD, digital download	—	—	—

=== EPs ===
List of studio albums, with selected chart positions
Title	Album details	Peak chart positions		
Title	Album details	USChr	USHeat	USInd
In Between	Released: August 2, 2018; Label: N/A; CD, digital download	—	—	—

=== Singles ===
- 2018: "Here We Go"
- 2018: "Trouble"
- 2019: Mountain
- 2020: "Against the Wall"
- 2020: "Providence"
- 2020: "Beyond It"
- 2020: "Vagrant"
- 2022: "Fighting For Me"
- 2022: "Valley"
- 2022: "Be Like You"
- 2023: "Close to Me"
