= Fiction Family Reunion =

Studio album by Fiction Family
- Released: January 29, 2013
- Recorded: 2010–2012; Spot X Studio
- Genre: Folk, pop
- Length: 37:32
- Label: Rock Ridge Music lowercase people
- Producer: Jon Foreman, Sean Watkins, Tyler Chester, Aaron Redfield

Fiction Family chronology
Holiday EP (2012)	Fiction Family Reunion (2013)

Fiction Family Reunion is the second studio album by Fiction Family, which is the collaboration between Switchfoot frontman and solo artist Jon Foreman, Nickel Creek guitarist and solo artist Sean Watkins, Tyler Chester, and Aaron Redfield. It was released on January 29, 2013, through the indie record label, Rock Ridge Music.

== Critical reception ==
Professional ratings
Review scores
Source	Rating
AllMusic	
Jesus Freak Hideout	4/5 stars
PopMatters	7/10

== Track listing ==
All tracks are written by Jon Foreman and Sean Watkins, except where noted.

No.	Title	Writer(s)	Length
1.	"Avalon"		3:50
2.	"Guilt"	Watkins	2:30
3.	"Up Against the Wall"	Foreman	4:42
4.	"Give Me Back My Girl"	Foreman	4:38
5.	"Damaged"	Watkins	2:37
6.	"God Badge"	Foreman	5:39
7.	"Never Call"		2:33
8.	"Just Rob Me"	Foreman	2:55
9.	"Reality Calls"	Watkins	2:16
10.	"Fools Gold"	Foreman	4:58

iTunes bonus tracks
No.	Title	Writer(s)	Length
11.	"Monster"	Foreman	4:39
12.	"Notch On the Tally"	Watkins	3:56

Spotify bonus tracks
No.	Title	Writer(s)	Length
11.	"My Forgetful Baby"	Foreman	3:47

== Personnel ==
Fiction Family

- Jon Foreman – vocals, guitar
- Sean Watkins – vocals, guitar
- Tyler Chester – bass guitar
- Aaron Redfield – drums

Additional personnel

- Fiction Family – production, engineering
- Chris Rondinella – engineering
- Adam Hawkins – mixing
- Hank Williams – mastering
- Tyler Halford – assistant
- Andy Barron – design, photography

== Charts ==
Chart (2013)	Peak position
US Billboard 200	173
US Top Christian Albums (Billboard)	10
US Americana/Folk Albums (Billboard)	6
US Independent Albums (Billboard)	23
