= Twilight (Future of Forestry album) =

Studio album by Future of Forestry
- Released: January 23, 2007
- Genre: Alternative rock, Christian rock
- Length: 60:45
- Label: Credential
- Producer: Ken Andrews and Eric Owyoung

Future of Forestry chronology
Future of Forestry (2006)	Twilight (2007)	Advent: Christmas (2008)

Professional ratings
Review scores
Source	Rating
AbsolutePunk.net	68%
Christian Music Today	4.5/5 stars
Jesus Freak Hideout	4/5 stars
Neufutur	6/10 stars

Twilight is Future of Forestry's debut album released on Credential Recordings. It was released on January 23, 2007.

== Track listing ==
1. "Open Wide" – 3:55
2. "All I Want" – 4:13
3. "Twilight" – 4:55
4. "Speak to Me Gently" – 4:09
5. "Thinking of You" – 4:27
6. "Sunrising" – 4:30
7. "Sacred Place" – 3:43
8. "You and I" – 4:44
9. "Sanctitatis" – 4:30
10. "If You Find Her" – 3:25
11. "Gazing" – 4:13
12. "Stay Beside Me/Hidden Track" – 14:01

== Awards ==
In 2008, the album was nominated for a Dove Award for Rock Album of the Year at the 39th GMA Dove Awards.
