= When She's Near =

Single by Fiction Family

from the album Fiction Family
- Released: January 12, 2009
- Recorded: 2006–2007
- Genre: Folk-pop, Rock
- Length: 2:56
- Label: ATO Records
- Songwriter(s): Jon Foreman; Sean Watkins
- Producer(s): Jon Foreman and Sean Watkins

"When She's Near" is the first single from the Jon Foreman/Sean Watkins collaboration Fiction Family's debut eponymous album. The song was first heard in early performances by Fiction Family, who still went by the name The Real SeanJon at the time. The earliest recorded performance was in December 2007. The finalized studio version was posted on the duo's Myspace on October 7, 2008, and was later made available for free download on the band's website.

== Writing and recording ==
Watkins originally wrote the melodies for the intro, verses, and bridge as the beginnings to one song, and Foreman had written the chorus for a song of his own. "It’s actually the melody to a song I wrote a long time ago called ‘Teaberry.’ I wrote it in ’03 or ’04, and I didn’t like the words, but I liked the melody,” Watkins said. “I brought the melody in and Jon did most of the lyrics." The songs eventually meshed together into the one song it is now. "I feel like it's a good blend of both of our voices," says Foreman.

== Music video ==
Fiction Family shot a music video for the song on October 15, 2008. It was directed by Brandon Dickerson, who had directed many videos for Foreman's band, Switchfoot. Watkins said on their Myspace blog,"I won't say too much about it 'cause I don't want to spoil the plot and ruin it for you but I will say it involved me taped to and pushed around in a dolly and Jon being carried around like some Biblical king in transit for hours on end."

The video was first released Monday, December 15, 2008, on Vimeo.

== Chart positions ==
Chart	Position
Triple-A Format	#39
