= Holiday EP =

EP by Fiction Family
- Released: November 19, 2012
- Recorded: 2010–2012; Spot X Studio
- Genre: Folk, pop
- Length: 22:31
- Label: lowercase people
- Producer: Jon Foreman, Sean Watkins, Tyler Chester, Aaron Redfield

Fiction Family chronology
Fiction Family (2009)	Holiday EP (2012)	Fiction Family Reunion (2013)

Holiday EP is an EP by Fiction Family, the collaboration between Switchfoot frontman and solo artist Jon Foreman, Nickel Creek guitarist and solo artist Sean Watkins, Tyler Chester, and Aaron Redfield. It was released as a free download on NoiseTrade on November 19, 2012.

"Up Against the Wall" & "Damaged" were included on their second album, Fiction Family Reunion whilst "My Forgetful Baby" was included on the Spotify version of that album.

== Track listing ==
1. "I Don't Need No Santa Claus" - 2:56
2. "Up Against the Wall" - 4:56
3. "Damaged" - 2:38
4. "We Ride (Live in San Francisco)" - 4:55
5. "Don't Say You Love Me" - 3:21
6. "My Forgetful Baby" - 3:48
