= Rebuild (song) =

Single by Switchfoot featuring Matt Thiessen and Dustin Ruth
- Released: November 1, 2007
- Recorded: 2007
- Genre: Rock
- Length: 3:39
- Label: lowercase people
- Songwriter(s): Jon Foreman; Matt Thiessen
- Producer(s): Switchfoot

"Rebuild" is a song written by Jon Foreman of Switchfoot and Matt Thiessen of Relient K. The song was written in conjunction with the bands' 2007 Appetite for Construction Tour, featuring members from all three bands on tour, Switchfoot, Relient K, and Ruth. Thiessen sang second vocals, and Dustin Ruth of Ruth played harmonica.

All proceeds from the song download will be donated to Habitat For Humanity. It was slated to surface on iTunes, but Relient K frontman Matt Thiessen said the two bands would release the single online for free, but with an option for donation for Habitat. "So I think we're gonna release it for free online and create a place where people can donate to Habitat," Thiessen said.

The song was first played live on October 17, 2007 at a live show in Columbus, Ohio.

== Early appearances ==
- Some of Switchfoot's live bootlegs from the tour contain this song.
- Jon Foreman officially confirmed the song's imminent online release on October 28, 2007 at a live show in Mobile, Alabama

== Official release ==
It was officially made available to the public November 1, 2007, as an optional download. Methods of downloading offered by the bands included donating money or time to Habitat, or downloading the song for free. This marked the very first release by Switchfoot's fledgling record label, lowercase people records.
