= Live at the Ventura Theatre (Switchfoot DVD) =

Live at Ventura Theatre

Video by Switchfoot
- Released: (United States) November 21, 2007
- Recorded: March 29, 2007; Ventura Theatre - Ventura, CA
- Genre: Alternative rock
- Length: 1:11:17
- Label: Lowercase People Records
- Producer: Switchfoot; Live Nation

Live at Ventura Theatre is a live performance DVD featuring the rock band Switchfoot. It was recorded live March 29, 2007 on one of the stops during the band's spring leg of the Oh! Gravity. Tour. It is the first DVD to be released under the band's own label, lowercase people records. The DVD features the performance, as well as a short mini-documentary about the event.

The DVD was first released on the band's online store November 21, 2007 and began December 9, 2007.

== Track listing ==
1. Stars
2. Politicians
3. Oh! Gravity.
4. This Is Your Life
5. Learning To Breathe
6. Yesterdays
7. Gone
8. American Dream
9. On Fire
10. Faust, Midas, and Myself
11. The Shadow Proves The Sunshine
12. Awakening
13. Meant To Live
14. Only Hope
15. Dare You To Move

=== Bonus Songs ===
1. Company Car
2. Burn Out Bright
3. We Are One Tonight

== Notes ==
- Notable for their absence are the songs "Dirty Second Hands" and "Ammunition," arguably two of the band's more energetic live numbers. Fans who went to this concert reported on the band's forums that those two songs were indeed performed at the show, but were most likely left off the DVD because the performances of those songs were not as strong as usual.
- The "Bonus Songs" were actually from the same show. It is unknown why they were moved to a "bonus songs" section.
- After the song, "American Dream," Jon Foreman plays the impromptu "Ventura Song" with his guitar and harmonica, while the band plays along. The song then immediately segues into "On Fire."
