= Lost Ocean (album) =

Studio album by Lost Ocean
- Released: February 20, 2007
- Studio: The Castle, Franklin, Tennessee
- Genre: Alternative rock
- Length: 45:53
- Label: Credential; 55107
- Producer: Nathan Dantzler

Lost Ocean chronology
Night to Life (2006)	Lost Ocean (2007)	Could This Be Love? (2009)

Professional ratings
Review scores
Source	Rating
Christian Music Today	4/5 stars
Jesus Freak Hideout	4/5 stars
Absolute Punk	(not rated)

Lost Ocean is the debut album released by Lost Ocean, under the Credential Records label. It features four songs of their EP, Night to Life. The album was released on February 20, 2007.

== Track listing ==
Lost Ocean
No.	Title	Length
1.	"Believe"	4:00
2.	"Still Life"	4:02
3.	"Just Glide"	3:59
4.	"You Are"	3:24
5.	"Mute"	5:31
6.	"Dreams"	4:19
7.	"Everything Is"	4:27
8.	"Trust"	4:08
9.	"Lights"	4:38
10.	"Vast"	7:25
Total length:		45:53
