= Los Angeles Baptist High School =

Los Angeles Baptist Middle School/High School

Location
- 9825 Woodley Ave. North Hills, California; United States; 34.249178°N 118.486453°W

Information
- Type: Private/Coeducational
- Established: 1962
- Closed: July 1, 2012
- Superintendent: Dr. Kendrick
- President: John Hunt
- Principal: Walter Clarke
- Chaplain: Samuel Chetti
- Grades: 6-12
- Colors: Purple and gold
- Mascot: Charlie Knight
- Website: www.heritage-schools.org

Los Angeles Baptist High School (LAB) was a Baptist, private, coeducational day school located in North Hills, California with approximately 848 students enrolled in grades 6 through 12. In the summer of 2012, the school was acquired by another Christian day school in the San Fernando Valley (Hillcrest Christian School), and the two merged to become Heritage Christian Schools. The L.A. Baptist campus is now the South Campus of Heritage Christian School. The campus was home to approximately 945 students in grades 7-12 under LAB ownership.

Los Angeles Baptist Middle School/High School was founded and administered by the Los Angeles Baptist City Mission Society later renamed American Baptist Churches of Los Angeles. The school was accredited by the Western Association of Schools and Colleges. On July 1, 2012, ownership of the campus was transferred to Hillcrest Christian School of Granada Hills, CA.

== Academics ==
Los Angeles Baptist Middle and High School, a college preparatory school, was privileged to have 39 teachers be a part of its mission to equip "the saints for the works of service, to the building up of the body of Christ." The school's mission is derived from Ephesians 4:12 (the New American Standard Bible Version that is used above). In pursuit of promoting intellectual growth in its students, Los Angeles Baptist required that prospective teachers have a Bachelor's degree or higher. The student/teacher ratio was 25:1. One hundred percent of Los Angeles Baptist students from the class of 2011 were admitted to either a university, college, speciality school, or military program.

== International students ==
In 2008, international students, who met a certain set of requirements, were accepted from the nation of South Korea. In 2009, they accepted students from Mexico and other countries as well. Currently there are students from South Korea, China, Germany, and Venezuela.

== Athletics ==
=== Middle school ===
- Boys Tackle Football
- Boys Basketball, former top 10 program in California
- Girls Basketball
- Girls Softball
- Girls Soccer, won championship title in the 2010 season
- Boys Baseball
- Boys Soccer
- Boys Volleyball
- Girls Volleyball
- Track
- Cross Country

=== High school ===
- Football 1970 – runner-up CIF Championship, 1971 CIF SS Champions (nationally ranked with #1 running back in nation), 1993 – CIF Champions, 2003 CIF SS runner-up CIF Championship, 1997 and 2005 Alpha League Champions, 2018 Olympic League Champions
- Cross Country placed 15th in the CIF State Championships in 2003–2004 season and 20th in the CIF State Championships during the 2008–2009 season., 2019 League Champions
- Girls Tennis
- Cheerleading
- Girls Volleyball 1982, 1983, 1984, 1985, 1986, 1988, 1989, 1990, 1991, 1992, 1994, 1995, 1996, 1997 Alpha League Champions
- Boys Baseball 1993, 1994, 1995, 1996, 1998, 2001 and 2002 Alpha League Champions and 2005 Olympic League Champions
- Girls Softball 1997 Alpha League Champions, 2004, 2007, 2016, 2017 Olympic League Champions, 2017 CIF SS Division V Runner-up
- Boys Volleyball 1993, 2003, 2004 Alpha League Champions
- Boys Soccer 1983, 1984, 1985, 1986, 1990 and 2009 Alpha League Champions
- Girls Soccer
- Boys Basketball – 1971 CIF "A" Champions, 1983, 1996, 1997 Alpha League Champions, 2017, 2019 Olympic League Champions
- Girls Basketball 2007 Delphic League Champions, 2007 CIF SS Division V-A Champions, 2017 CIF SS Division V-AA Champions
- Track and Field
- Equestrian Team
- Coed Golf Team

For more detailed sports information: LA Baptist's CBS MaxPreps homepage

== Spiritual life ==
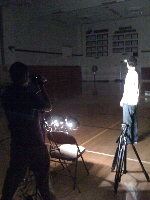
Director Jonathan Park, also known as "J.P", filming a video for chapel with Spencer Bakst entitled The Filing Cabinet.

As a Christian school, one of the school's goals was to contribute in the spiritual growth of its students. Once a week, the whole student body, including both middle school and high school students, come together for chapel. In chapel, the school's worship team leads the student body in worship, and guest speakers come to speak the Word of God. Past guests have included Donn Moomaw, Nick Vujicic, Louis Zamperini, and Something Like Silas. Every year, the spiritual life chairman, a student, who is chosen by a committee, proposed a spiritual life theme for the year. The spiritual life chairman is a part of the ASB and presides over the chapel team. The chapel team consists of a group of students who come together to make a few chapels that creatively convey the year's spiritual life theme. This year's spiritual life theme is "God is Greater". Spiritual Life Week, which takes place twice a year, is a week where three days of the school week are set aside for school chapels, which challenge the students' religious life and personal commitment to Christ. From sixth grade to twelfth grade, students are required to take a religion class, including a course that is taken second semester by students in eleventh grade in world religions that studies the beliefs of Hinduism, Buddhism, Judaism, and Islam. In the first semester of their Senior year, students takes a course in Apologetics. In 2009, faculty member Philip Struyk was named the first campus pastor.

== Performing arts program ==
Los Angeles Baptist Highschool has performed numerous plays in the chapel theater. In 2016, the Advanced Drama Department will be performing an Adaptation of "Around the World in Eighty Days", adapted by David Calvillo

== Middle School educational events ==
LA Baptist middle school students have the opportunity to participate in several extra-curricular educational events, many of which are sponsored by ACSI, including the ACSI spelling bee, math olympics, and geography bee. Students participating in these events compete against students from other Christian secondary schools in the greater Los Angeles area.

== Traditions ==
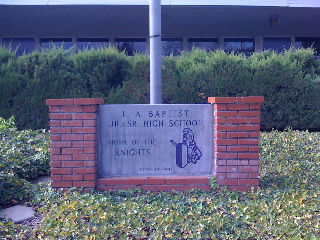
Senior class gift from the class of 1990.

Annually, the student body has a day of refreshment called Spirit Day where high school classes compete with one another, while middle school homerooms compete against one another. The day is planned out by the ASB and the Middle School Student council. At the annual Junior-Senior Banquet, the Junior Class hosts the Senior Class at the event. The Senior Patio is reserved for the Senior Class. The Senior Class yearly gives the school a Senior Class gift.

== Scouts ==
In the 2007–08 school year, Boy Scouts of America Troop 356 was formed, averaging 12-18 Scouts.

== Publications ==
Los Angeles Baptist had three school publications: The Commitment, Excalibur, and The Knight Writer. The Commitment is a quarterly newsletter magazine sent to parents of students, alumni and friends of Los Angeles Baptist High School. Excalibur is a literary magazine that publishes the English works of students. The magazine was first published in 1987 as Opus Minimus, which remained the title of the literary magazine from 1987 to 1989. Unbound Treasure proceeded as the literary magazine's title from 1991 to 1994, then Los Angeles Baptist Annual Literary Magazine followed from 1994 to 2001. In 1994, Excalibur became the fourth title and has remained as its respective title. In 2005, a group of high school students came together to create The Knight Writer. The Knight Writer was the first newspaper that appeared on campus after a sum of years where the school did not have a newspaper. The school began to offer a journalism class taught by Sharon Ranieri in 2006, and since then, the journalism class has kept a newspaper circulating the student body. Starting in 2009, there will also be a Middle School newspaper.

== Bible Bowl ==
The Bible Bowl is a huge football game event where the Los Angeles Baptist Knights compete against their rivals, the Crusaders from Village Christian High School. The Heritage Christian won this year's Bible Bowl game.

== Allyson Felix Track ==
On May 21, 2008, the school began to renovate its field, covered with green grass and dirt, into a synthetic field with an eight-lane, synthetic surface track and permanent bleachers. The new field was dedicated to Olympic gold medalist Allyson Felix at the school's Homecoming 2008 Festivity, which took place on October 11, 2008. games. The day of the dedication, Los Angeles Baptist played St. Margaret's football team, winner of the 2007 CIF-Southern Section Northeast Division title, but lost the game in a devastating loss of Knights 0 to Tartans 52.

== Notable alumni ==
- James Adomian, comedian
- Alisa Childers, singer/songwriter
- Shannen Doherty, actress
- Blake McIver Ewing, actor and singer/songwriter
- Allyson Felix, track and field athlete, six Olympic gold medals, 11 world championship gold medals
- Armie Hammer, actor
- Phil Parlapiano, musician, singer, songwriter, member of Iron Butterfly
- Todd Sand, figure skater, U.S.A. Olympian (1992, 1994, 1998)
