= Fall (Jon Foreman EP) =

EP by Jon Foreman
- Released: November 27, 2007
- Recorded: 2007
- Genre: Acoustic
- Length: 21:57
- Labels: Lowercase people, Credential
- Producers: Charlie Peacock, Jon Foreman

Jon Foreman chronology
Fall (2007)	Winter (2008)

Alternative covers
- Fall & Winter Compilation Cover

Professional ratings
Review scores
Source	Rating
AbsolutePunk.net	(85%)
Allmusic	4.5/5 stars
Jesus Freak Hideout	4.5/5 stars
Christianity Today	4.5/5 stars
The Album Project	5/5 stars
Pop Matters	7/10 stars
IGN	(June 6, 2010)
Patrol Magazine	(June 6, 2010)

Fall is the first EP released by Jon Foreman, frontman of the San Diego rock band Switchfoot. Foreman announced on his MySpace blog that the EP was initially to be released to iTunes and online at jonforeman.com and amazon.com on November 27, 2007. It was released on iTunes and Amazon a week earlier, on the 20th and was promptly removed. It was officially released on November 27, and debuted at No. 15 on the iTunes top albums chart. It peaked at No. 2 on the Amazon Top albums chart.

== Release and reception ==
Fall was released with the Winter EP as a physical double-disc set on January 15, 2008.

The Fall & Winter CD combo debuted on the Billboard Top Heatseeker's chart at No. 24.

The Fall & Winter compilation was nominated for a Dove Award for Pop/Contemporary Album of the Year at the 40th GMA Dove Awards.

== In popular culture ==
- The sixth track from the EP, "My Love Goes Free", can be heard in the 2007 motion picture Bella.
- "The Moon Is a Magnet" was considered for Switchfoot's sixth studio album, Oh! Gravity., but didn't make the final cut.
- "The Cure for Pain" was played in the season finale of the popular ABC drama Grey's Anatomy.

== Track listing ==
All tracks are written by Jon Foreman.

No.	Title	Length
1.	"The Cure for Pain"	4:45
2.	"Southbound Train"	4:15
3.	"Lord, Save Me from Myself"	3:03
4.	"Equally Skilled"	4:54
5.	"The Moon Is a Magnet"	1:54
6.	"My Love Goes Free"	3:07
