= Live at the Ventura Theatre =

Live at the Ventura Theatre may refer to live DVDs by various bands:

- Live at the Ventura Theatre (Switchfoot DVD)
- Live at the Ventura Theater, by Something Corporate
