= Sarah Masen (album) =

Studio album by Sarah Masen
- Released: June 25, 1996
- Recorded: Nashville, Tennessee
- Genre: Christian pop
- Length: 40:37
- Label: re:think
- Producer: Charlie Peacock

Sarah Masen chronology
The Holding (1995)	Sarah Masen (1996)	Carry Us Through (1998)

Professional ratings
Review scores
Source	Rating
AllMusic	4/5 stars

Sarah Masen is the first major-label studio album by the singer/songwriter Sarah Masen, released on June 25, 1996. It is her second album, overall.

== Critical reception ==
Rodney Batdorf of AllMusic writes that, "Sarah Masen's self-titled album showcases her emotional, moving vocals, as well as her evocative lyrics." and finishes with, "the album suggests that she'll blossom into one of the most creative and lovely CCM talents of the latter-half of the '90s."

This album peaked at no. 27 on October 12, 1996, on Billboard's Top Christian Albums.

Jan Willem Vink writes in his Cross Rhythms interview with Masen that, "There's something more compelling about Sarah Masen than the simple fact that she's the first artist to be signed to Charlie Peacock's new label Re:Think. In fact, her self-titled album needed only a few of Charlie's wide range of production twists to expose its class."

== Track listing ==
All tracks are written by Sarah Masen, except track 5, written by Victoria Williams.

No.	Title	Length
1.	"All Fall Down"	3:41
2.	"Break Hard the Wishbone"	5:04
3.	"Flames of Truth"	4:30
4.	"Unveiled Faces"	4:22
5.	"Love"	3:51
6.	"Downtown"	4:36
7.	"Tuesday"	3:28
8.	"Come In"	3:15
9.	"Kissing Tree"	3:11
10.	"Fly Baby"	4:39
Total length:		40:37

- At the beginning of the CD there is a 32:11 hidden track which contains interactive multimedia and video footage that can be accessed on the CD-Rom drives of most Mac and Windows computers.
- Track information and credits verified from the album's liner notes.

== Personnel ==
- Sarah Masen – vocals, backing vocals (5, 9, 10)
- Tim Lauer – Wurlitzer electric piano (1, 3, 6), Hammond B3 organ (1, 3–6, 9, 10), pump organ (3, 5, 9), harmonica (5)
- Charlie Peacock – Wurlitzer electric piano (2), backing vocals (5)
- Matt Hudson – electric guitar (1, 3, 5, 7, 8, 10)
- Jerry McPherson – electric guitar (1–6, 9)
- George Cocchini – guitar solo (1), electric guitar solo (4), electric guitar (7, 8, 9)
- Gary Burnette – acoustic guitar (3, 6, 7, 9, 10), mandolin (3, 10), electric guitar (10)
- Mark Hill – bass
- Dave Masen – drums (1, 3–8, 10)
- Chris McHugh – drums (1, 2, 9)
- Eric Darken – percussion (1, 3, 4, 6, 10)
- Kristin Wilkinson – viola (2)
- David Davidson – violin (2)
- Doug Moffet – clarinet (5)
- Molly Ashworth – backing vocals (5)
- Sam Ashworth – backing vocals (5)
- Brent Bourgeois – backing vocals (6, 10)
- Molly Felder – backing vocals (6, 10)

Handclaps on "Break Hard the Wishbone"

- Molly Ashworth, Nick Barré, Mark Hill, Katy Krippaehne, Sarah Masen, Chris McHugh, Charlie Peacock and Jay Swartzendruber

=== Production ===
- Charlie Peacock – producer
- Shane D. Wilson – recording, mixing
- Richard Rose – recording assistant, mix assistant
- Terry Watson – recording assistant, mix assistant
- Ken Love – mastering at MasterMix (Nashville, Tennessee)
- Katy Krippaehne – production coordinator
- Andi Ashworth – budget administration
- Nick Barré – art direction
- Unidea Design – design, additional photography
- Ron Keith – cover photography
