= Travel III =

Travel III EP

EP by Future of Forestry
- Released: June 29, 2010
- Recorded: 2010
- Genre: Alternative rock, Christian Rock
- Label: Credential Recordings
- Producer: Eric Owyoung

Future of Forestry chronology
Travel II EP (2009)	Travel III EP (2010)	Advent: Christmas EP Volume 2 (2010)

Travel III EP is the sixth album by the Christian rock band Future of Forestry, and the third in the "Travel Series." The recording of the album “officially” started on February 11. It was released on June 29, 2010. Frontman Eric Owyoung wrote all of the songs for this EP and his wife, Tamara Owyoung, painted the cover art for the album. The band subsequently departed on what was called "The 3 Tour" to go along with the release. The tour was self-booked and took place in the West and Midwest regions of the United States starting on June 27, 2010 and ending on July 13, 2010.

== Track listing ==
The names (and respective order) of the songs were released on the band's Myspace page leading up to the release of the CD, as they did for the rest of the Travel Series EPs. However, on Travel III, for the first time, Future of Forestry released the tracks out-of-order.

1. "Bold and Underlined" - 4:04
2. "Working to Be Loved" - 3:48
3. "Did You Lose Yourself" - 4:47
4. "Protection" - 4:14
5. "Horizon Rainfall" - 2:53
6. "Your Day's Not Over" - 5:00

== Awards ==
The album was nominated for a Dove Award for Rock Album of the Year at the 42nd GMA Dove Awards.
