= Travel (Future of Forestry EP) =

Travel EP

EP by Future of Forestry
- Released: (United States) May 5, 2009
- Recorded: 2008–2009
- Genre: Alternative rock, Christian rock
- Length: 27:12
- Label: Credential Recordings
- Producer: Eric Owyoung

Future of Forestry chronology
Advent: Christmas (2008)	Travel EP (2009)	Travel II EP (2009)

Professional ratings
Review scores
Source	Rating
AllMusic	3.5/5 stars

Travel EP is the fourth album by the Christian rock band Future of Forestry and the first in the "Travel Series." It was released on May 5, 2009.

== Background ==
Frontman Eric Owyoung wrote all of the songs for this EP and he also took the pictures that appear inside of the album booklet. His wife, Tamara Owyoung, painted the cover art for the album. The band released one of the six songs each week leading up to the album release date in preparation for the album.

== Commercial performance ==
This is currently the band's first album to debut on the charts, peaking at #49 on the Top Christian Albums Chart.

== Track listing ==
1. "Traveler's Song" - 3:48
2. "This Hour" - 3:40
3. "Colors in Array" - 5:36
4. "Close Your Eyes" - 4:02
5. "Closer to Me" - 4:11
6. "Hallelujah" - 5:55
