= The Wonderlands: Shadows =

Shadows

EP by Jon Foreman
- Released: July 17, 2015
- Genre: Contemporary Christian music, Christian rock, folk rock
- Length: 25:31
- Label: lowercase people
- Producer: Eric Owyoung

Jon Foreman chronology
Sunlight (2015)	Shadows (2015)	Darkness (2015)

Shadows is the second in an extended play series The Wonderlands by Jon Foreman. lowercase people records released the EP on July 17, 2015. The series is a collaborative effort, with a different producer for each song, and Foreman sending in tracks recorded backstage while on tour.

== Critical reception ==
Professional ratings
Review scores
Source	Rating
365 Days of Inspiring Media	4.5/5 stars
CCM Magazine	4.5/5 stars
Christian Music Review	4.5/5
Cross Rhythms	9/10 squares
Jesus Freak Hideout	4/5 stars
New Release Today	4.5/5 stars
PPCORN	4.8/5 stars

Kevin Sparkman, giving the EP four and a half stars from CCM Magazine, writes, "Shadows incorporates six standalone treasures that showcase an introspective, yet spotless Foreman." Awarding the EP four stars for Jesus Freak Hideout, Roger Gelwicks states, "Shadows is an unavoidably drearier listen than some, but it never lacks the character that always comes with Foreman's songwriting." Ryan Barbee, rating the EP four stars from Jesus Freak Hideout, writes, "The Wonderlands hasn't been what was expected, but it is most definitely a great adventure thus far." Assigning a nine out of ten on the EP from Cross Rhythms, Helen Whitall says, "Foreman taking on big themes of life, death and temptation; asking deep and difficult questions as if facing up to the shadows lurking over our shoulders that we can't run from forever."

Giving the EP four and a half stars at New Release Today, Mary Nikkel describes, "Shadows shows us that he has risen to that challenge admirably". Rating the EP a 4.8 stars by PPCORN, Jessica Morris says, "Shadows is poignant and beautiful." Joshua Andre, awarding the EP four and a half stars at 365 Days of Inspiring Media, opines, "If you thought that Sunlight was epic then Shadows is even more so." Signaling in a 4.5 out of five EP review for Christian Music Review, Lauren McLean replies, "Shadows from The Wonderlands collection is good for the soul and easy to listen to." Bert Gangl, indicating in a four star review by Jesus Freak Hideout, responds, "Foreman's willingness to color outside the lines of convention, perhaps more than anything else, which continues to render his solo-based efforts so absolutely unforgettable."

== Track listing ==
Track list
No.	Title	Length
1.	"Ghost Machine"	5:09
2.	"My Coffin"	4:12
3.	"Fake Your Own Death"	4:00
4.	"Good for Me"	4:53
5.	"Your Love Is Enough"	3:44
6.	"Siren's Song"	3:36
Total length:		25:31

== Chart performance ==
Chart (2015)	Peak position
US Top Alternative Albums (Billboard)	20
US Christian Albums (Billboard)	4
US Folk Albums (Billboard)	8
US Top Rock Albums (Billboard)	26
