= The Appetite for Construction Tour =

2007 concert tour by Switchfoot and Relient K

- Tour by Switchfoot and Relient K
- Start date: October 16, 2007
- End date: December 3, 2007
- Legs: 1
- No. of shows: 34
- Supporting act: Ruth
Switchfoot tour chronology
Oh! Gravity. Tour (2007)	The Appetite for Construction Tour (2007)	Up in Arms Tour (2008)

The Appetite for Construction Tour was a three-month 2007 concert tour that was co-headlined by rock bands Switchfoot and Relient K, with special guests Ruth.

The tour was unique in that none of the bands involved were touring to push a new album or single. They embarked on the tour to benefit Habitat For Humanity, and donated one dollar per ticket sold to the organization. At end of the tour, the bands had raised over $100,000 for Habitat.

Switchfoot frontman Jon Foreman also co-wrote a song with Relient K singer Matt Thiessen called "Rebuild" for the tour. It was released as a "donation single" on Switchfoot's website, with options to donate time or money to Habitat For Humanity, in exchange for the song.

The tour was Tour Managed by Jennifer Manning and Production Managed by Scott Cannon. It played mostly in indoor arenas or stadiums, as opposed to small rock clubs, Switchfoot's favored stomping grounds. The tour's name is a reference to Appetite for Destruction, the debut album of American hard rock band Guns N' Roses.

== Show and set list ==
=== Ruth ===
Ruth was the first band to perform at the shows, playing 4-5 songs in a half-hour-long set.

=== Relient K ===
Relient K was the first of the headlining acts to perform, with their set usually lasting about an hour and a half. The set list featured hits like "Be My Escape" and "Who I Am Hates Who I've Been" from their 2004 breakthrough record, "Mmhmm", as well as some of their older classics and newer songs. The band did not perform an encore, playing all their songs in one set.

- The band also routinely covered the theme from the hit TV show, The Office.
- For the dance-floor favorite "Sadie Hawkins Dance", the band usually brought up people from the audience to play guitar and percussion instruments for the end of the song.

=== Switchfoot ===
Switchfoot was the second of the two headliners to play, and their set usually lasted about an hour and a half as well. Because they were co-headlining with Relient K, many of the songs on this tour were old favorites from the band's multi-platinum "The Beautiful Letdown", along with their singles.

The setlist generally consisted of the following, with minor variations in song order:

1. "Meant to Live intro"
2. "Oh! Gravity."
3. "Stars"
4. "This Is Your Life"
5. "Gone/Crazy In Love mash-up"
6. "American Dream"
7. "Dirty Second Hands"
8. "We Are One Tonight"
9. "Rebuild"
10. "On Fire"
11. "Awakening"
12. "Meant to Live"
13. "Rebuild"

Encore

14. "Only Hope"
15. "Dare You to Move"
- Songs like "Ammunition" and "Head over Heels (In This Life)" were also played in light rotation.
- Rebuild was played with every band member from the other two bands on-stage.

== Tour dates ==
Date	City	Country	Venue
October 16, 2007	Charleston	United States	Charleston Municipal Auditorium
October 17, 2007	Columbus	United States	Veterans Memorial Auditorium
October 18, 2007	Grand Rapids	United States	DeltaPlex Arena
October 19, 2007	Cedar Falls	United States	University of Northern Iowa
October 20, 2007	Saint Paul	United States	Concordia University
October 21, 2007	Fargo	United States	Fargo Civic Center
October 23, 2007	Merrillville	United States	Star Plaza Theatre
October 24, 2007	Evansville	United States	The Centre
October 25, 2007	Jonesboro	United States	ASU Convocation Center
October 26, 2007	Grand Prairie	United States	Nokia Theater at Grand Prairie
October 27, 2007	Cypress	United States	Berry Center
October 28, 2007	Mobile	United States	Mobile Civic Center
October 29, 2007	Baton Rouge	United States	Baton Rouge River Center
November 1, 2007	Columbia	United States	Township Auditorium
November 2, 2007	Winston-Salem	United States	Joel Coliseum Theatre
November 3, 2007	Greenville	United States	BI-LO Center
November 4, 2007	Atlanta	United States	Atlanta Civic Center
November 8, 2007	Knoxville	United States	Knoxville Coliseum
November 9, 2007	Springfield	United States	Prairie Capital Convention Center
November 10, 2007	Green Bay	United States	University of Wisconsin–Green Bay – Campus Grounds
November 11, 2007	Moline	United States	The Mark of the Quad Cities
November 13, 2007	Ypsilanti	United States	Eastern Michigan University Convocation Center
November 14, 2007	Cincinnati	United States	Cincinnati Gardens
November 15, 2007	University Park	United States	Bryce Jordan Center
November 16, 2007	Bethlehem	United States	Stabler Arena
November 17, 2007	New York City	United States	Hammerstein Ballroom
November 18, 2007	Baltimore	United States	1st Mariner Arena
November 27, 2007	Irvine	United States	Bren Events Center
November 28, 2007	San Luis Obispo	United States	Recreation Center
November 29, 2007	San Jose	United States	San Jose Civic Auditorium
November 30, 2007	Davis	United States	UC Davis Pavilion
December 1, 2007	Medford	United States	Jackson County Expo
December 2, 2007	Salem	United States	Oregon State Fair
December 3, 2007	Everett	United States	Everett Events Center
