= Sarah Masen =

American singer-songwriter

- Born: January 12, 1975 (age 51); Royal Oak, Michigan, U.S.
- Occupations: Singer, songwriter, multi-instrumentalist
- Years active: 1995–present
- Labels: Word Records, re:think
- Spouse: David Dark
- Website: sarahmasen.com

Sarah Masen is an American singer-songwriter based in Nashville, Tennessee. She was initially signed to Charlie Peacock's re:think label. She was subsequently signed to Word Records, and is now independent. As a songwriter, she has collaborated with Béla Fleck, Julie Lee and Sam Ashworth.

== Biography ==
Masen became a Christian in 1992 and began writing music in the same year; her music reflected influences such as Rich Mullins and 10,000 Maniacs as well as from her studies in Literature and History. She released her first album in 1995 with the ‘Art Institute’ band.

In 1998 she released Carry Us Through, and in 1999 BEC Recordings reissued The Holding as a Sarah Masen solo album. After the release of The Dreamlife of Angels in 2001, Masen did not release her own new material for six years, although in 2004 she did contribute two tracks to the album Stars and Sirens by Pristina, a collective of female artists teamed with producer Joey B. of The Echoing Green.

Jon Foreman of the band Switchfoot featured Masen on several tracks on his Summer EP.

=== Personal life ===
Masen is originally from the suburbs of Detroit, Michigan. She is married to author David Dark, and they live in Nashville, Tennessee with their three children. As of 2024, Masen runs a pottery studio. Masen's sister Emily is married to Jon Foreman of Switchfoot.

== Discography ==
Albums

- The Holding (1995, independent)
- Sarah Masen (1996, re:think)
- Carry Us Through (1998, re:think)
- The Holding (1999, re-issue, REX)
- The Dreamlife of Angels (2001, Word)

EPs

- Women's Work Is Alchemy (2007 EP, independent)
- A History of Light and Shadow (2007 EP, independent)
- Magic That Works (2007 EP, independent)
