= Oh! Gravity. Tour =

2006–07 concert tour by Switchfoot

- Tour by Switchfoot
- Location: Asia; Australia; Europe; New Zealand; North America
- Associated album: Oh! Gravity.
- Start date: October 17, 2006
- End date: September 10, 2007
- Legs: 5
- No. of shows: 106

Switchfoot concert chronology
- Nothing Is Sound Tour (2005–06); Oh! Gravity. Tour (2006–07); The Appetite for Construction Tour (2007)

The Oh! Gravity. Tour is a 2007 concert tour by the alternative rock band Switchfoot, held to promote their sixth studio album, Oh! Gravity. The tour began in Utrecht, Netherlands on January 31 and ended in Saint Joseph, Missouri on April 17. During the 77-day tour, the band performed in nineteen states, six provinces in Canada, and three countries in Europe, plus several shows in the United Kingdom. The tour was depicted in one live concert film, Live at the Ventura Theatre, which was shot during the North American leg of the tour.

== Set list ==
For the North American leg of the tour, Switchfoot brought pop/rock band Copeland as the opening act. They usually played a 45-minute to 1 hour long set, before Switchfoot took the stage to play a 2-hour long set.

Switchfoot's hit song Stars from their Nothing Is Sound album was the staple opener for the vast majority of the shows. The Oh! Gravity. Tour also marked the first time the band played the songs "Faust, Midas, and Myself" and "4:12", both from the album "Oh! Gravity.", live. Usually, Switchfoot ended their set, as in past tours, with an encore, playing their smash hit single "Dare You to Move". The band kept a diary called the "Daily Foot" on their website to document each show of the tour. The entries included each show's set list.

Switchfoot is known for their efforts to keep in touch with their fans and bring them alongside the process of writing, recording, releasing and playing an album. In the Oh! Gravity. Tour, the band took this a step further by allowing fans to vote on the set list. They also allowed people to vote for non-Switchfoot songs, promising to "learn it if we can (Jon)" and play them in their live shows.

== Live show bootlegs ==
On February 9, 2006, Tim Foreman talked about the possibility of releasing CDs of every show Switchfoot does during the Oh! Gravity. Tour.

"Another thing that we've never done before: sell bootlegs of a few songs from the show at the end of the night. See for a lot of us, the end of the night comes too soon. This way, you could actually be listening to the show in your car on the way home from the gig! So we're still trying to figure this one out logistically, but where there's a will there's a way."

Switchfoot began selling these "live" CDs at the House of Blues on February 13. Each night they made 100 CDs available, but the songs have been circulated through the World Wide Web with greater distribution, thanks to the band-approved website, switchfootbootlegs.com.

== Tour dates ==
List of 2006 concerts
Date	City	Country	Venue
October 17, 2006	Bakersfield	United States	Fox Theater
October 18, 2006	West Hollywood	United States	Roxy Theatre
October 19, 2006	Sacramento	United States	Crest Theatre
October 20, 2006	Portland	United States	Crystal Ballroom
October 21, 2006	Boise	United States	Big Easy Concert House
October 23, 2006	Denver	United States	Ogden Theatre
October 25, 2006	Chicago	United States	Smart Bar
October 26, 2006	Minneapolis	United States	Trocaderos
October 27, 2006	Milwaukee	United States	Rave Hall
October 28, 2006	St. Louis	United States	Pageant Concert NightClub
October 30, 2006	Columbus	United States	Newport Music Hall
November 1, 2006	Holland	United States	DeVos Fieldhouse
November 2, 2006	Detroit	United States	Saint Andrew's Hall
November 3, 2006	Cleveland	United States	Agora Theatre and Ballroom
November 4, 2006	Lancaster	United States	The Chameleon Club
November 5, 2006	Scranton	United States	Tink's Entertainment Complex
November 7, 2006	Norfolk	United States	Norva Theatre
November 8, 2006	New York City	United States	Irving Plaza
November 10, 2006	Charlotte	United States	Tremont Music Hall
November 11, 2006	Jacksonville Beach	United States	Freebird Live
November 12, 2006	Fort Lauderdale	United States	Revolution Live
November 13, 2006	Lake Buena Vista	United States	House of Blues
November 14, 2006	Atlanta	United States	Coca-Cola Roxy Theatre
November 16, 2006	Nashville	United States	War Memorial Auditorium
November 17, 2006	Little Rock	United States	The Village
November 18, 2006	Tulsa	United States	Cain's Ballroom
November 20, 2006	Albuquerque	United States	Sunshine Theater
November 21, 2006	Tempe	United States	Marquee Theatre
November 22, 2006	Las Vegas Valley	United States	House of Blues

List of 2007 concerts
Date	City	Country	Venue
January 31, 2007	Utrecht	Netherlands	Tivoli De Helling
February 1, 2007	Hamburg	Germany	Gruenspan
February 2, 2007	Silkeborg	Denmark	Silkeborg Musikhus
February 3, 2007	Minden	Germany	Zum Landauer
February 4, 2007	Frankfurt	Germany	Batschkapp
February 5, 2007	London	England	Shepherd's Bush Empire
February 6, 2007	London	England	Shepherd's Bush Empire
February 7, 2007	Swansea	Wales	Brangwyn Hall
February 8, 2007	Perth	Scotland	Perth Concert Hall
February 9, 2007	Bradford	England	Abundant Life Centre
February 10, 2007	Derby	England	Riverside Centre
February 13, 2007	Anaheim	United States	House of Blues
February 14, 2007	San Francisco	United States	Slim's
February 15, 2007	Medford	United States	Main 1 Arts Center
February 16, 2007	Eugene	United States	McDonald Theatre
February 17, 2007	Spokane	United States	Big Easy Concert House
February 18, 2007	Seattle	United States	Fenix Underground
February 19, 2007	Vancouver	Canada	Croatian Cultural Centre
February 21, 2007	Calgary	Canada	MacEwan Hall Ballroom
February 22, 2007	Edmonton	Canada	Edmonton Event Centre
February 23, 2007	Saskatoon	Canada	Prairieland Park
February 24, 2007	Winnipeg	Canada	Garrick Centre
February 26, 2007	Thunder Bay	Canada	Thunder Bay Community Auditorium
February 28, 2007	Toronto	Canada	Kool Haus
March 1, 2007	London	Canada	Cowboys Ranch
March 2, 2007	Ottawa	Canada	Capitol Music Hall
March 3, 2007	Montreal	Canada	Le National
March 6, 2007	Burlington	United States	Higher Ground
March 7, 2007	Worcester	United States	Worcester Palladium
March 8, 2007	Providence	United States	Lupo's Heartbreak Hotel
March 9, 2007	Hartford	United States	Webster Theater
March 10, 2007	Philadelphia	United States	Theatre of Living Arts
March 11, 2007	Baltimore	United States	Rams Head Live!
March 13, 2007	Clifton Park	United States	Northern Lights
March 14, 2007	Buffalo	United States	Town Ballroom
March 15, 2007	Millvale	United States	Mr. Smalls Theatre
March 16, 2007	Forest Park	United States	The Underground
March 17, 2007	Charleston	United States	Music Farm
March 18, 2007	Asheville	United States	The Orange Peel
March 19, 2007	Columbia	United States	Headliners Live
March 22, 2007	New Orleans	United States	House of Blues
March 23, 2007	Houston	United States	Warehouse Live
March 24, 2007	Austin	United States	La Zona Rosa
March 25, 2007	Dallas	United States	Gypsy Tea Room
March 26, 2007	Oklahoma City	United States	Diamond Ballroom
March 28, 2007	Tucson	United States	Rialto Theatre
March 29, 2007	Ventura	United States	Ventura Theatre
March 30, 2007	Avalon	United States	Avalon Theatre
March 31, 2007	San Diego	United States	Soma San Diego
April 13, 2007	Buies Creek	United States	Pope Convocation Center
April 14, 2007	Knoxville	United States	Bijou Theatre
April 16, 2007	Springfield	United States	Abou Ben Adhem Shrine Mosque
April 17, 2007	Saint Joseph	United States	St. Joseph Civic Arena
April 18, 2007^{[A]}	Omaha	United States	Sokol Auditorium
April 20, 2007^{[B]}	Waco	United States	Fountain Mall
April 21, 2007^{[C]}	Arlington	United States	Maverick Stadium
June 11, 2007^{[D]}	Los Angeles	United States	Gibson Amphitheatre
June 16, 2007^{[E]}	Wilmore	United States	Ichthus Farm
June 22, 2007^{[F]}	Mineral City	United States	Atwood Lake Park
June 27, 2007^{[G]}	Mount Union	United States	Agape Farm
June 29, 2007^{[H]}	Bushnell	United States	Cornerstone Farm
July 3, 2007^{[I]}	Del Mar	United States	Harrah's Grandstand Stage
July 14, 2007^{[J]}	Willmar	United States	Willmar High School Grounds
July 26, 2007^{[G]}	George	United States	Gorge Amphitheatre
August 4, 2007^{[K]}	Monterey	United States	Mazda Raceway Laguna Seca
August 11, 2007^{[L]}	West Allis	United States	Miller Lite Main Stage
August 17, 2007^{[M]}	Sedalia	United States	Pepsi Grandstand
August 18, 2007^{[N]}	Des Moines	United States	Iowa State Fair Grandstand
August 24, 2007^{[O]}	Louisville	United States	Cardinal Stadium
August 25, 2007^{[P]}	Valdosta	United States	All-Star Amphitheatre
August 31, 2007	Perth	Australia	Challenge Stadium
September 1, 2007^{[Q]}	Sydney	Australia	Sydney Showground
September 5, 2007	Auckland	New Zealand	TelstraClear Pacific Events Centre
September 6, 2007	Melbourne	Australia	Festival Hall
September 7, 2007	Adelaide	Australia	Paradise Auditorium
September 8, 2007	Brisbane	Australia	Brisbane Entertainment Centre
September 10, 2007	Pasay	Philippines	Cuneta Astrodome

Festivals and other miscellaneous performances
^{A} Concert for the Cause: Benefit for the Omaha Children's Hospital
^{B} 8th Annual Island Party
^{C} Springfest
^{D} Rock the Boat Concert
^{E} Ichthus Music Festival
^{F} Alive Festival
^{G} Creation Festival
^{H} Cornerstone Festival
^{I} San Diego County Fair
^{J} Sonshine Festival
^{K} Spirit West Coast
^{L} Wisconsin State Fair
^{M} Missouri State Fair
^{N} Iowa State Fair
^{O} Kentucky State Fair
^{P} Wild Adventures 2007 Concert Series
^{Q} Big Exo Day
