= David Dark =

American writer (born 1969)

- Born: 1969 (age 56–57)
- Occupation: writer, teacher
- Education: Middle Tennessee State University, Vanderbilt University
- Period: 2002-2023
- Subject: Christianity, philosophy
- Notable works: The Gospel According to America
- Spouse: Sarah Masen
- Children: 3

David Dark (1969-present) is an American author of books on philosophy and Christianity. He is also a lecturer and professor of theology, and teaches at a women’s correctional facility.

== Early life and education ==
Dark was born in 1969. He earned a BA from Middle Tennessee State University. He received his PhD from Vanderbilt University, in 2011.

== Career ==
Dark began his career teaching high school English. He now teaches at the College of Liberal Arts and Social Sciences at Belmont University as an associate professor of religion and the arts. Dark also teaches at the Tennessee Prison for Women and formerly taught at the now defunct Charles Bass Correctional Facility.

Dark has written six books, as well as a chapter of the book Radiohead and Philosophy: Fitter, Happier More Deductive. His most notable works include Life's Too Short To Pretend You're Not Religious (2016), The Sacredness of Questioning Everything (2009), and Everyday Apocalypse (2002). Dark has also contributed his writing to outlets like MTV News, Books & Culture, Pitchfork, and The Oxford American, Paste, America Magazine, The Christian Century, and Religion News Service.

== Awards and recognition ==
The Gospel According to America was included in Publishers’ Weekly’s top religious books of 2005.

== Appearances ==
David Dark has spoken at the Festival of Faith and Music at Calvin College in Grand Rapids, Michigan several times, including as a workshop speaker in 2003 and 2009, and the keynote speaker at the 2005 and 2007 events.

He also spoke at the UK’s Greenbelt Festival in 2023.

Dark appeared in the 2013 documentary "American Jesus".

== Personal life ==
Dark is married to singer/songwriter Sarah Masen and they live in Nashville, Tennessee with their three children.

== Works ==
=== Books ===
- Dark, David (2002). Everyday Apocalypse: The Sacred Revealed in Radiohead, The Simpsons, and Other Pop Culture Icons. Grand Rapids, MI: Brazos Press. ISBN 9781587430558.
- ——— (2005). The Gospel According To America: A Meditation on a God-blessed, Christ-haunted Idea. ISBN 9780664227692.
- ——— (2009). The Sacredness of Questioning Everything. Grand Rapids, MI: Zondervan. ISBN 9780310286189.
- ——— (2016). Life's Too Short to Pretend You're Not Religious. Downer's Grove, IL: InterVarsity Press. ISBN 9780830844463.
- ——— (2019). The Possibility of America. London, UK: Westminster John Knox Press. ISBN 9780664264659.
- ——— (2023). We Become What We Normalize: What We Owe Each Other In Worlds That Demand Our Silence. London, UK: Broadleaf Books. ISBN 9781506481685.

=== Chapters ===
- ——— (2009). "Chapter 7. "The Eraser": Start Making Sense". In Forbes, Brandon W.; Reisch, George A. (eds.). Radiohead and Philosophy: Fitter, Happier, More Deductive. Popular Culture and Philosophy. Vol. 38. Chicago and La Salle, IL: Open Court. ISBN 9780812696646.
