= Be My Escape =

2004 single by Relient K

Single by Relient K

from the album Mmhmm
- Released: November 2, 2004
- Genre: Pop punk; Christian rock; emo
- Length: 4:00
- Label: Gotee; Capitol
- Songwriter: Matthew Thiessen
- Producers: Mark Lee Townsend; Matthew Thiessen

Relient K singles chronology
"I Celebrate the Day" (2003)	"Be My Escape" (2004)	"Who I Am Hates Who I've Been" (2005)

Music video
- "Be My Escape" on YouTube

"Be My Escape" is a song by American Christian rock band Relient K. It was released on November 2, 2004, as the lead single from their fourth full-length studio album, Mmhmm, which was released on the same day. The song was their first entry on the US Billboard Hot 100, where it peaked at number 82. The song was certified gold in the US on October 5, 2005. In 2019, Jesus Freak Hideout ranked "Be My Escape" at the tenth spot on their "Relient K's Top 20 Songs" list.

== Background ==
"Be My Escape" is the singer Matt Thiessen's plea for "escape" from his past mistakes. Although the lyrics avoid directly mentioning God, given the band's Christian background and some of the themes in the song, it is usually taken to refer to Him. "Be My Escape" uses guitars, drums, and keyboards, and the pace is varied effectively to give a sense of longing and desperation. The last forty seconds or so are a slow epilogue, with no instruments other than the drums, vibraphone and piano.

An acoustic version of the song was released in November 2005 on the Apathetic EP. It included the addition of a mandolin.

== Composition and arrangement ==
"Be My Escape" was written by Matt Thiessen and was produced by Mark Lee Townsend. The song was mixed at South Beach Studios in Miami by Tom Lord-Alge and was mastered by Jim DeMain and Ted Jensen. The song was written shortly after the release of their third studio album, Two Lefts Don't Make a Right...but Three Do. Although he had not written the lyrics for the song yet, he had a piano riff, which he would play "over and over again". The song's arrangement is considered to be "unorthodox," which Thiessen said was the idea going into this song, avoiding to write something predictable and rather something formulaic.

The opening lines, "I've given up on giving up slowly, I'm blending in so you won't even know me, Apart from this whole world that shares my fate, This one last bullet you mention is my one last shot at redemption, Because I know to live you must give your life away" is a Christian lyric, which Thiessen wrote from his perspective of being in a bad place and how he was unhappy with himself at the time.

According to the sheet music published at Musicnotes.com, by Alfred Music Publishing, the track runs at 200 BPM and is in the key of A major. Thiessen's range in the song spans from the notes A3 to F#6.

== Live performances ==
From the release of Mmhmm until October 2005, the song was mainly played a little past the halfway point of the band's set. For the Panic With A K Tour in October 2005, it and "I So Hate Consequences" were the encore songs in that order. From the Matt Hoopes Birthday Tour in February 2006, through the 2006 festival season, it was the opening song. The band moved it to the second song for the 2006 Nintendo Fusion Tour.

During 2007, it was included in a three-song encore of "Sadie Hawkins Dance", "Be My Escape", and "I So Hate Consequences". While band was on The Appetite for Construction Tour, the song was performed as the third song from the set list. In 2008, it was performed during the middle of their set for their Uncle Fest tour. The song was moved to second in the set list for the November and December 2008 Winter Wonder Slam Tour with TobyMac. For the 2009 Winter Wonder Slam Tour, it was performed at the end of their set.

The song was performed on their Um Yeah tour in 2022, which Thiessen said "That song ['Be My Escape'] has existed for a long time for us, so I can play it with my eyes closed sort of thing. That's half the fun, that I can just play it and kind of look at everyone singing along and just kind of vibe off of that." As of 2025, the song continues to be a part of their set list.

== Music video ==
Relient K in the shrinking room from the music video.

The music video was released on March 28, 2005, and was directed by Charles Jensen and produced by Rachel Curl. The video shows Relient K playing in a room where the walls are slowly closing in on them. At the end, a burst of light appears and the walls of the room fall down, but away from the band. The band then plays in an open field with the album cover's sunflowers in it, with the background shot on a blue screen. This video was the first Relient K music video to feature bassist John Warne and guitarist Jon Schneck.

Reflecting on the music video, Thiessen was "less than thrilled" stating, "The video didn't come out exactly like we wanted to. I mean, I like the concept, and it might just be because we were so involved with the video that it didn't turn out the way we wanted. We wanted a lot of animation, and all we got was a bit of animated clouds on a green screen. And then there were the moving walls, which we wanted to be a little smoother, but it was just a bunch of stagehands pushing on the walls."

The video reached the top ten on the MTV Total Request Live countdown.

== Awards ==
The song was nominated for two Dove Awards at the 37th GMA Dove Awards: Pop/Contemporary Recorded Song of the Year and Short Form Music Video of the Year.

== Credits and personnel ==
Credits for "Be My Escape" adapted from album's liner notes.

Relient K

- Matt Thiessen – lead vocals, rhythm guitar, piano
- Matt Hoopes – lead guitar
- Dave Douglas – drums, backing vocals
- Brian Pittman – bass

Production

- Mark Lee Townsend – producer, additional engineer
- Matt Thiessen – producer
- Joe Marlett – engineer
- Tom Lord-Alge – mixing
- Jim DeMain – mastering at Yes Master (Nashville, Tennessee)
- Ted Jensen – mastering at Sterling Sound (New York City, New York)

== Charts ==
Weekly chart performance for "Be My Escape"
Chart (2004–2005)	Peak position
US Billboard Hot 100	82
US Pop 100 (Billboard)	48
US CHR/Pop Top 50 (Radio & Records)	44
US Christian CHR Songs (Radio & Records)	3
US Christian Rock Songs (Radio & Records)	1

== Certifications ==
Certifications and sales for "Be My Escape"
Region	Certification	Certified units/sales
United States (RIAA)	Gold	500,000^{*}
^{*} Sales figures based on certification alone.

== Release history ==
Release dates and formats for "Be My Escape"
Region	Date	Format(s)	Label(s)	Ref(s).
United States	November 2, 2004	Digital download	Gotee; Capitol	
United States	February 22, 2005	Hot adult contemporary; contemporary hit radio	Gotee; Capitol	
