= The Wonderlands: Darkness =

Darkness

EP by Jon Foreman
- Released: September 4, 2015
- Genre: Christian alternative rock, folk, folk rock
- Length: 27:58
- Label: lowercase people

Jon Foreman chronology
Shadows (2015)	Darkness (2015)	Dawn (2015)

Darkness is the third release in an extended play series, The Wonderlands, by Jon Foreman. Lowercase people records released the EP on September 4, 2015. The project was a collaborative effort amongst many producers and was mixed by Eric Owyoung of Future of Forestry. Each song in the series was produced by a different producer, with Foreman sending in parts he recorded backstage while on tour.

== Critical reception ==
Professional ratings
Review scores
Source	Rating
365 Days of Inspiring Media	4.5/5 stars
CCM Magazine	4.5/5 stars
Cross Rhythms	8/10 squares
Jesus Freak Hideout	3.5/5 stars 4/5 stars
New Release Today	4.5/5 stars

Kevin Sparkman, giving the EP four and a half stars for CCM Magazine, states, "Despite its name, this short set doesn't play like a musical dirge, rather keeping The Wonderlands tradition alive with sonically diverse sensations and ongoing brilliance." Awarding the EP four and a half stars at New Release Today, Mary Nikkel states, "Musically, this project is equally strong." In an eight out of ten review for Cross Rhythms, Helen Whitall criticizes several tracks, which she writes "slightly diminishes what is otherwise another stunning release."

Joshua Andre, rating the EP four and a half stars from 365 Days of Inspiring Media, writes, "If you thought that Sunlight and Shadows were both epic, then Darkness continues on that trend." Signaling in a three-and-a-half-star review by Jesus Freak Hideout, Jeremy Barnes replies, "Darkness may be the weakest of The Wonderlands releases for reasons unrelated to individual songwriting." Dylan O'Conner, indicating in a four-star review at Jesus Freak Hideout, responds, "Darkness is an engaging experience that draws us closer to the finale of the Wonderlands saga."

== Track listing ==
Track list
No.	Title	Length
1.	"Come Home"	4:51
2.	"Beautiful, Pt. II"	5:15
3.	"You Alone"	3:53
4.	"She Said"	4:24
5.	"Larger Than Life"	3:56
6.	"June & Johnny" (featuring Sara Watkins)	2:36
7.	"Inner Peace"	3:03
Total length:		27:58

== Chart performance ==
Chart (2015)	Peak position
US Top Alternative Albums (Billboard)	22
US Christian Albums (Billboard)	7
US Folk Albums (Billboard)	3
US Top Rock Albums (Billboard)	30
