= The Future of Forestry =

Poem by C. S. Lewis

"The Future of Forestry" is a poem by C. S. Lewis; one of three poems; along with "Under Sentence" and "Pan's Purge", it or one of three poems where Lewis expressed concern about the impact that modern society and technology would have on the countryside. It was first published in The Oxford Magazine in February 1938 and contains themes of social critique that would be present in Lewis's later Narnia series. The poem has been compared to later poems, such as Philip Larkin's 1972 work "Going, Going".

The name of the poem helped influence the naming of the California band Future of Forestry.
