= Lost Ocean =

- Origin: Bakersfield, California, United States
- Genres: Christian rock
- Years active: 2004–present
- Label: Credential
- Members: Jeff Grey; Skyler Johnson; Bret Black; Christopher Short
- Website: lostoceanmusic.com

Lost Ocean is an American Christian rock band from Bakersfield, California, United States; they are currently Independent, but were signed to Credential Recordings until early 2009. They have released two EPs and a self-titled debut that was released on February 20, 2007. In January 2008, they went on the Northwest Winter Rock Tour with The Send and Ruth; and then later on the Credential Recordings Tour with other Credential bands in April 2008.

The band started as a combination of two different bands that attended the same church (Riverlakes Church). Black, Johnson and Short were in a band called The Last Of Us and Gray was in a band called the Curves. After a few line up changes and stylistic changes the band settled on the pop, indie rock sound they are known for.

In early 2009, it was announced that Lost Ocean had been dropped from Credential Recordings after their contract ran out. In June 2009, Lost Ocean released their first independent release called All Our Friends - EP. In November 2009, Lost Ocean released their second studio album, Could This Be Love?

== Discography ==
=== Studio albums ===
- Douse the Choir – (2005)
- Lost Ocean – (February 20, 2007)
- Could This Be Love? – (November 6, 2009)

=== EPs ===
- Night to Life – (August 15, 2006)
- All Our Friends – (June 20, 2009)
- Out of Control (Found Demos) – (April 15, 2020)

=== Compilation appearances ===
- Stereocilia Vol. 1 (June 10, 2006)
- The Tour EP (January 23, 2007)
