= The Wonderlands: Dawn =

Dawn

EP by Jon Foreman
- Released: October 23, 2015
- Genre: Christian alternative rock, folk rock
- Length: 24:01
- Label: lowercase people

Jon Foreman chronology
| Darkness (2015) | Dawn (2015) |

Dawn is the fourth installment in an extended play series The Wonderlands by Jon Foreman. Lowercase people records released the EP on October 23, 2015. The series is a collaborative effort, with a different producer for each song, and Foreman sending in tracks recorded backstage while on tour.

== Critical reception ==
Professional ratings
Review scores
| Source | Rating |
|---|---|
| 365 Days of Inspiring Media | 4.5/5 stars |
| CCM Magazine | 5/5 stars |
| Cross Rhythms | 10/10 squares |
| Jesus Freak Hideout | 4/5 stars |
| New Release Today | 4.5/5 stars |

Awarding the EP five stars at CCM Magazine, Matt Conner states, "Dawn brightens the horizon with six new acoustic tracks that lift the spirit...Foreman sings as one who has found light in the darkness, wrapping this EP series with the revelations learned along the way." Christopher Smith, giving the EP four stars from Jesus Freak Hideout, writes, "Jon Foreman has a similar vision for his Wonderland series, but instead of paintings, he used the medium of song and instead of a church, his subject is the human condition. With the preceding EP's tackling material like mortality, addiction, and hypocrisy, Dawn EP offers relief from the weightiness." Rating the EP four and a half stars for New Release Today, Mary Nikkel says, "Dawn provides us with a satisfying yet bittersweet conclusion to The Wonderlands." Helen Whitall, indicating in a ten out of ten review by Cross Rhythms, describes, "vibrant gem". Signaling in a 4.8 out of five review at The Christian Beat, Lauren McLean says, "Jon Foreman's collection of new EP's is truly a wonderland." Joshua Andre, assigning four and a half stars to the EP from 365 Days of Inspiring Media, responds, "Each and every of the [6] songs are sure to inspire, confront, comfort, reassure, ask questions and probe, as we try to find out our purpose and destiny, and discover who God wants us to be in this life."

== Track listing ==
Track list
| No. | Title | Length |
|---|---|---|
| 1. | "Inheritance" | 4:54 |
| 2. | "Run Free" | 4:37 |
| 3. | "Inseparable" | 4:01 |
| 4. | "When We Collide" | 3:05 |
| 5. | "Mercy's War" | 3:50 |
| 6. | "Before Our Time" (featuring Sara Watkins) | 2:54 |
| Total length: | | 24:01 |

== Chart performance ==
| Chart (2015) | Peak position |
|---|---|
| US Christian Albums (Billboard) | 11 |
| US Folk Albums (Billboard) | 6 |
| US Top Rock Albums (Billboard) | 35 |
