= Interrobang (Switchfoot album) =

2021 album by Switchfoot

Studio album by Switchfoot
- Released: August 20, 2021
- Recorded: 2021
- Studio: Sound City Studios, Van Nuys
- Genre: Alternative rock
- Length: 43:34
- Label: Fantasy
- Producer: Tony Berg

Switchfoot chronology
Covers (2020)	Interrobang (2021)	This Is Our Christmas Album (2022)

Singles from Interrobang
- 1. "I Need You (To Be Wrong)" Released: May 7, 2021; 2. "Fluorescent" Released: June 18, 2021; 3. "The Bones of Us" Released: July 9, 2021; 4. "If I Were You" Released: August 6, 2021

Professional ratings
Review scores
Source	Rating
CCM Magazine	3.5/5 stars
The Music	3/5 stars
Rock Hard	6/10

Interrobang (stylized in all lowercase) is the twelfth studio album by American alternative rock band Switchfoot. It was released on August 20, 2021, through Fantasy Records. A deluxe edition was released digitally on July 8, 2022. It is the last album to feature lead guitarist Andrew Shirley.

== Background ==
The band wished to explore themes of disunity and common ground, choosing to work with producer Tony Berg as they felt that the stark difference between their Christian viewpoint and his atheistic viewpoint would lend well to these themes.

== Track listing ==
All tracks stylized in all lowercase.

All tracks are written by Tim and Jon Foreman, except where noted.

No.	Title	Writer(s)	Length
1.	"Beloved"	Tony Berg; T. Foreman; J. Foreman	5:34
2.	"Lost 'Cause"		3:44
3.	"Fluorescent"	J. Foreman	3:35
4.	"If I Were You"		3:48
5.	"The Bones of Us"		4:02
6.	"Splinter"		3:47
7.	"I Need You (To Be Wrong)"		3:33
8.	"The Hard Way"		3:26
9.	"Wolves"	J. Foreman	3:10
10.	"Backwards in Time"		4:13
11.	"Electricity"	J. Foreman	4:38
Total length:			43:34

Deluxe edition bonus tracks
No.	Title	Length
12.	"Interrobang" (B-side)	3:48
13.	"Youth of the Young" (B-side)	4:09
14.	"The Sound of Holding Breath" (B-side)	4:57
15.	"I Need You (To Be Wrong)" (lovelytheband Remix)	3:05
16.	"Wolves" (Sir Sly Remix)	3:52
Total length:		63:28
