= The Wonderlands: Sunlight =

Sunlight

EP by Jon Foreman
- Released: May 26, 2015
- Genre: Christian alternative rock, folk, acoustic rock
- Length: 24:48
- Label: lowercase people
- Producer: Tyler Strickland; Anton Patzner; Neal Avron; Eric Owyoung; Keith Tutt; Aaron Roche; Dan Brigham; Jeremy Lutito; Jason Morant

Jon Foreman chronology
Limbs and Branches (2008)	Sunlight (2015)	Shadows (2015)

Sunlight is the first of four EPs to be released under Jon Foreman's second solo-project, The Wonderlands. Foreman describes the project as, "trying to explore the physical space of music. I wanted to create a place that would exist only when you press play; a place of light and shadows, tension and release, things that you know and things that you don’t know. It's incredible that you can create a mood, almost a structure of feeling. All 24 songs will correspond with different moods of the day. At the end I'm going to do 25 concerts in 24 hours."

The series is a collaborative effort, with a different producer for each song, and Foreman sending in tracks recorded backstage while on tour.

== Critical reception ==
Professional ratings
Review scores
Source	Rating
365 Days of Inspiring Media	4.5/5 stars
CCM Magazine	4/5 stars
Cross Rhythms	9/10 squares
FDRMX	4.8/5 stars
Jesus Freak Hideout	4/5 stars 3.5/5 stars 4.5/5 stars
New Release Tuesday	4.5/5 stars

Matt Conner, giving the EP four stars from CCM Magazine, describes, "Foreman's new solo sets show a deep consideration of a life lived in both darkness and light." Awarding the EP four and a half stars for New Release Tuesday, Mary Nikkel states, "The first installment of The Wonderlands is a strong start for a promising EP arc." Jessica Morris, giving the EP a 4.8 star review at FDRMX, writes, "A delight to the ears, heart and the imagination, Sunlight tackles some of the most debilitating and important topics of life with a lightness and hope that will strengthen you." Awarding the EP a nine out of ten from Cross Rhythms, Helen Whitall says, "there are some excellent songs here and lyrically Foreman is going from strength to strength." Joshua Andre, indicating in four and a half star review at 365 Days of Inspiring Media, recognizes, "As for the rest of The Wonderlands releasing in a few months; if they’re as half as good as Sunlight, then Jon Foreman is sure to have a brighter and longer career ahead of him!" Signaling in a four star review by Jesus Freak Hideout, Roger Gelwicks responds, "Sunlight is a refreshing piece of artistry".

== Track listing ==
All tracks are written by Jon Foreman.

No.	Title	Length
1.	"Terminal"	5:09
2.	"The Mountain"	3:58
3.	"You Don't Know How Beautiful You Are"	3:32
4.	"Caroline"	4:08
5.	"Patron Saint of Rock and Roll"	3:35
6.	"All of God's Children"	4:26

== Chart performance ==
Chart (2015)	Peak position
US Billboard 200	104
US Top Alternative Albums (Billboard)	9
US Christian Albums (Billboard)	2
US Folk Albums (Billboard)	2
US Top Rock Albums (Billboard)	11
