= Turn Off the Stars =

- Origin: Toronto, Ontario, Canada
- Genres: pop, indie rock
- Years active: 2004–2009
- Labels: Credential, Curve
- Members: Michael Walker; Andrew Walker; Max Kennedy; Jake Palahnuk
- Past members: John Dawson

Turn Off the Stars was a Canadian pop rock band based in Toronto, Ontario. The band's name is taken from a Bill Evans song. Their atmospheric, anthemic songwriting has been compared to Britpop artists such as Coldplay, Doves, and Keane. The band has toured nationally in the US and Canada, and has opened for Switchfoot, April Wine, and The Tea Party. The band has also played in London, Ontario. The band played their final show in June 2009.

== Discography ==
=== Albums ===
- Turn Off the Stars - Credential Recordings (2006)

=== EPs ===
- Everything Is OK - Curve Music (2004)

=== Compilations ===
- Stereocilia Vol. 1 - Credential Recordings (2006)
- The Tour EP - Credential Recordings (2007)
