= Molly Jenson =

American singer-songwriter

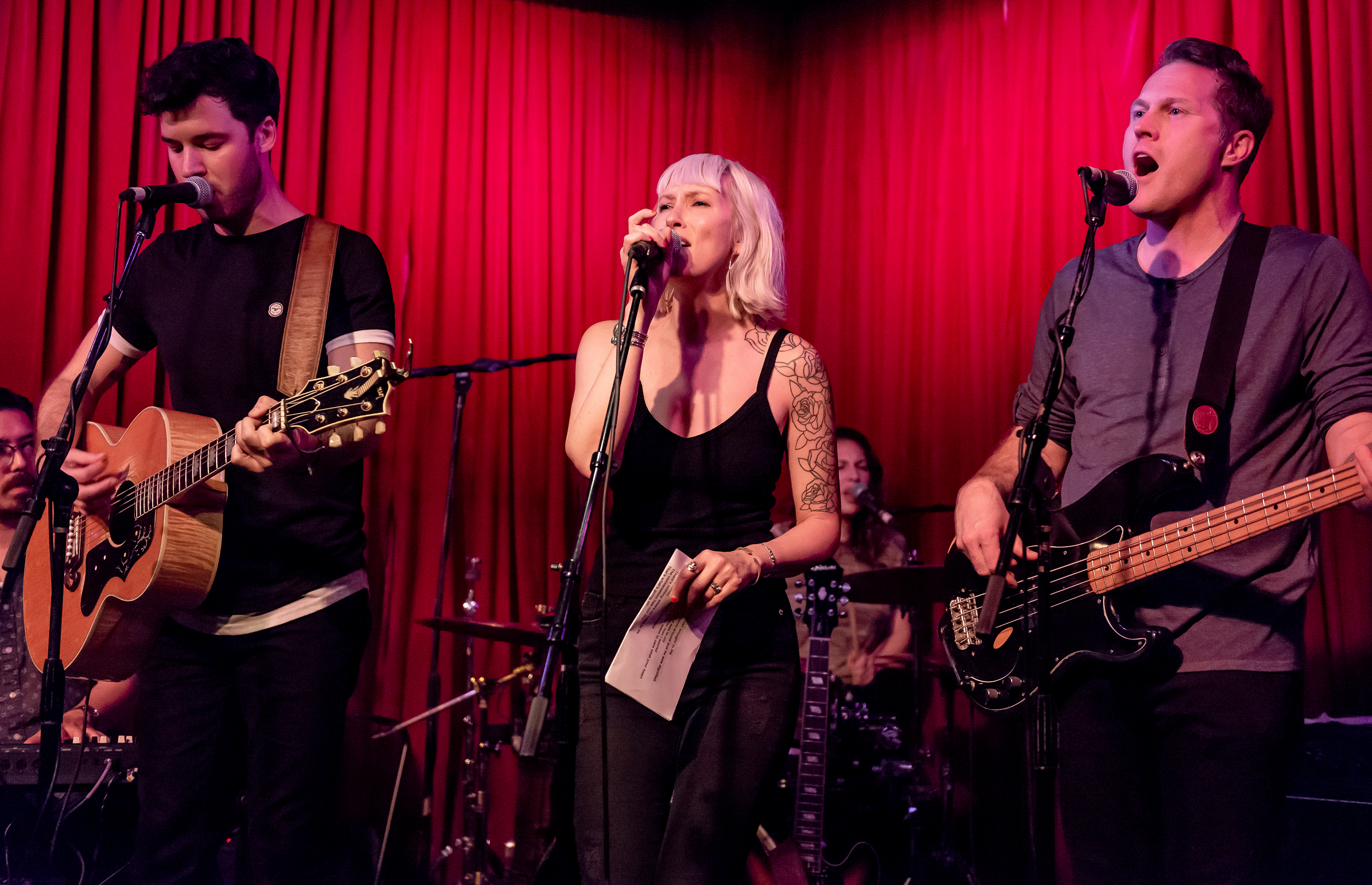
- Molly Jenson in 2018

Background information
- Born: March 20, 1979 (age 47)
- Origin: California
- Occupation: Singer-songwriter
- Instruments: Vocals, guitar
- Years active: 2007–present
- Labels: Bully! Pulpit Records; Nettwerk Music Group
- Website: mollyjenson.com

Molly Jay Jenson (born March 20, 1979) is a singer-songwriter from San Diego, California.

== Origins ==
At age twelve, Jenson was a vocalist in her first band, named "GALS". The band was composed of several of her classmates. For about a year, Jenson was a vocalist with the Christian rock band, Everybodyduck, which toured California for several years playing churches and camps. Other members of the band included Darin McWatters as the lead vocalist, guitarists Josh Blanken, Cory Knapp and Tim Sovinec, and drummer Mike Day.

== Music career ==
She won the award for "Best Acoustic Act" at the 2007 San Diego Music Awards. In April 2007, Teen Vogue Magazine named her "One of the three best new artists on MySpace". In 2007, she collaborated with Switchfoot lead singer Jon Foreman on his solo Spring EP. In May 2008, she signed to producer Mark Joseph's Bully! Pulpit Records, in a joint partnership with Nettwerk Music Group (home to top artists like Sarah McLachlan, Avril Lavigne and The Cardigans). Her first album on Bully! Pulpit/Nettwerk "Maybe Tomorrow", produced by Greg Laswell, was released worldwide on March 3, 2009, featuring a duet with Foreman titled "Do You Only Love The Ones Who Look Like You." In September 2008 Jenson's song "Give It Time" was selected to appear in the Freshman Survival Kit, which went out to 75,000 incoming college freshman. In the fall of 2008, Jenson's song, "Wait For You Here," was used in the premiere of the new NBC Television show Knight Rider, while another song "Give It Time" was used in the CW show Privileged. More recently, Molly Jenson was featured on Sherwood's third album, Qu on the song "Worn".

== Live performances/Tours ==
Jenson toured in Japan in 2008 and has toured in the United States and Europe. She is also known for touring with American country music singer Sam Outlaw.

== Musical style and Musicianship ==
Jenson's work has been compared to many other musicians. In 2009, Relevant Magazine drew comparisons to Mazzy Star and Leona Naess while crosswalk.com likened her to Missy Higgins, Bethany Dillon, A Fine Frenzy, and Ingrid Michelson.

In 2010, Dean Nelson reported that Teen Vogue saw similarities to the sounds of Norah Jones and Sheryl Crow, while drawing his own comparisons to Joni Mitchell and Bette Midler.

== Discography ==
=== Albums ===
Maybe Tomorrow (released April 2005 – re-released March 3, 2009)

1. Give It Time (4:09)
2. Beginning Here (4:10)
3. Maybe Tomorrow (3:45)
4. Thinking of You (3:42)
5. And You Were (2:36)
6. The Edgy 8 Ball Song (4:26)
7. Alongside You (3:02)
8. Alongside You (Part 2) (1:52)
9. Wednesday (1:45)
10. I'm Sorry For Me (5:09)
11. Thank You My Friend (4:37)
12. Wait For You Here (4:49)
13. Do You Only Love The Ones Who Look Like You (3:46)

== Awards and nominations ==
| Year | Nominated work | Organization | Award | Result |
|---|---|---|---|---|
| 2006 | Maybe Tomorrow | 16th Annual San Diego Music Awards | Best Pop Album | Nominated |
| 2007 | — | 17th Annual San Diego Music Awards | Best Acoustic Act | Won |
