= Fiction Family =

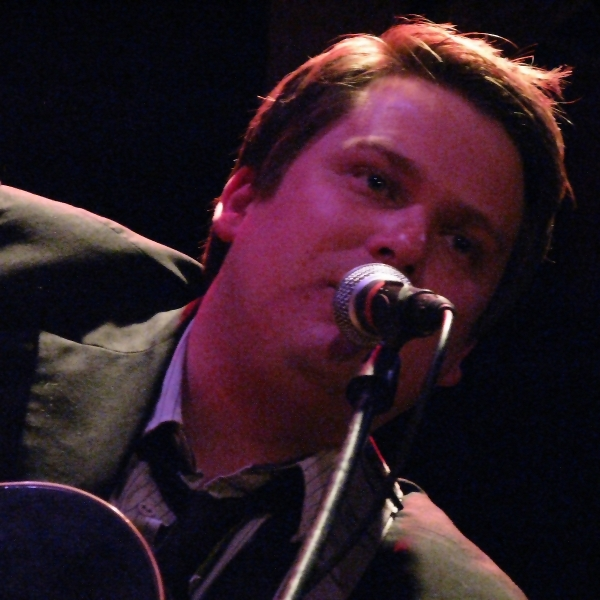
- Sean Watkins, half of Fiction Family

Background information
- Origin: Cardiff-by-the-Sea, Encinitas, California, U.S.
- Genres: Indie folk
- Years active: 2006–present
- Labels: ATO, MapleMusic, lowercase people
- Members: Jon Foreman; Sean Watkins; Tyler Chester; Aaron Redfield
- Website: fictionfamily.com

Fiction Family is a musical collaboration between Switchfoot frontman Jon Foreman and Nickel Creek guitarist Sean Watkins. The duo's self-titled, full-length album was released on January 20, 2009. The band has since added a drummer and a bassist, Tyler Chester and Aaron Redfield.

According to Watkins, the band's name comes from the fact that "Usually when two guys make a record together, it sounds cool to call them the something brothers. But we're not, so that's how Fiction Family came to be." Says Foreman, "They are two words that hold a lot of meaning for me. I think that much of who we are as a culture lean towards fiction. As for the family of it, you have the entire nation that's kind of looking for family. That's one of the reasons why I like the name. Also both of us come from sibling bands and this is not a sibling band, so this is kind of a fiction family of sort."

== History ==
The two began the collaboration in 2005 by writing songs together, according to a blog post on Watkins's website. Around Mid-2006 they began recording the songs, in bits and pieces while the two were off the road, announcing themselves as "The Real SeanJon," a name jokingly chosen in the hopes that Sean "Sean John" Combs would sue them.

However, on March 13, 2008, it was reported that The Real SeanJon had changed their name to "Fiction Family." They had already completed the record and had tentatively titled it "Betrayal" before the name change.

It was also rumored at one point that Starbucks might put out Fiction Family's record, sometime in the summer of 2008. "We’re doing the final song right now, and there’s a rumor that there’s a large company that produces caffeinated beverages that might put it out in a few months. So, we’ll see," said Foreman. But later, Foreman stated that the record would be released in January 2009, and a press release by Nickel Creek later confirmed the release date of the self-titled album, Fiction Family. It was released on January 20, 2009, by ATO Records, and entered the charts at number 71.

Fiction Family released their first single "When She’s Near" for free download on their website, and an accompanying music video was released in December 2008.

The band traveled on its first tour, which debuted members Aaron Redfield (greyboy allstars, Brooke Fraser) and Tyler Chester (producer, Brooke Fraser, Nikka Costa) and lasted just over a month, extending from early January to February 7, 2009. They played in cities across the east and west coasts, including Boston, New York, Charlottesville, Atlanta, Philadelphia, Nashville, Seattle, and San Diego (both Jon and Sean's home city).

=== Fiction Family Reunion ===
On March 29, 2010, at a Switchfoot "after"-show in Birmingham Alabama, Jon told fans that "we've been working on the new Fiction family album" and that they had 8 tracks down, and then played a new song from the album called "Just Rob Me". On October 27, 2010, Jon Foreman announced via Twitter that the new album was "getting close". In December, Watkins tweeted that he and Foreman had conducted an 11-hour-long mixing session for the new album.

On June 14, 2011, Fiction Family performed live for the first time in months, including several songs which would eventually appear on the new album: "My Girl", "Damaged", "Reality Calls", and "Against the Wall".

On October 14, 2012 it was reported through Twitter that the newest album, tentatively titled Fiction Family Reunion, was available for listening on SoundCloud. Within 12 hours, it was confirmed that the SoundCloud account was not legitimate and the album was leaked by a fan-created account. The following day, the account was shut down and the album removed. Land Of Broken Hearts and MySwitchfeed, two Switchfoot fansites, called for fans to respect the band's privacy by deleting or not distributing any music files from the leaked album. On January 29, 2013, the album, titled Fiction Family Reunion, was released.

== Discography ==
=== Studio albums ===
Title	Album details	Peak chart positions			
Title	Album details	US	US Christ.	US Ind.	US Int.
Fiction Family	Released: January 20, 2009; Label: ATO Records	71	3	8	71
Fiction Family Reunion	Released: January 29, 2013; Label: Rock Ridge Music	173	10	23	—

=== Extended plays ===
Title	Album details
Holiday EP	Released: November 19, 2012; Label: lowercase people

=== Singles ===
Title	Year	Album
"When She's Near"	2009	Fiction Family
