= Something Like Silas =

American Christian alternative rock band

- Origin: San Diego, California
- Genres: Christian alternative rock
- Years active: 2000–2006
- Label: Sparrow
- Past members: Eric Owyoung; Nick Maybury; Luke Floeter; Spencer Kim; Ben Wurzell; John Luzzi; Malina Owyoung; Lenny Beh
- Website: somethinglikesilas.com

Something Like Silas was an American Christian alternative rock band from San Diego, California.

== Background ==
The band played at the Hume Lake Christian camp before being signed onto Sparrow Records in 2003. They were also the regular band at Flood, a ministry that met at Kearny High School in San Diego, and was pastored by Matt Hammett. In late 2006, the band members regrouped, with a different musical direction, as Future of Forestry.

== Members ==
Final

- Eric Owyoung - lead vocal, guitar, keys
- Nick Maybury - guitar, vocals, keys
- Luke Floeter - bass, keys
- Spencer Kim - drums

Former members

- Ben Wurzell - bass
- John Luzzi - bass
- Malina Owyoung - keyboards, vocals
- Lenny Beh - drums

== Discography ==
=== Albums ===
- Creation's Call - Independent (2000)
- Something Like Silas Live - Independent (2001)
- SL Silas EP - Independent (2002)
- Glimpses - Independent (2003)
- Divine Invitation - Sparrow Records (2004)

=== Singles ===
- "Prayer for Santana" - Independent (2001)
