= Charlie Peacock =

American singer, songwriter, pianist, and author (born 1956)

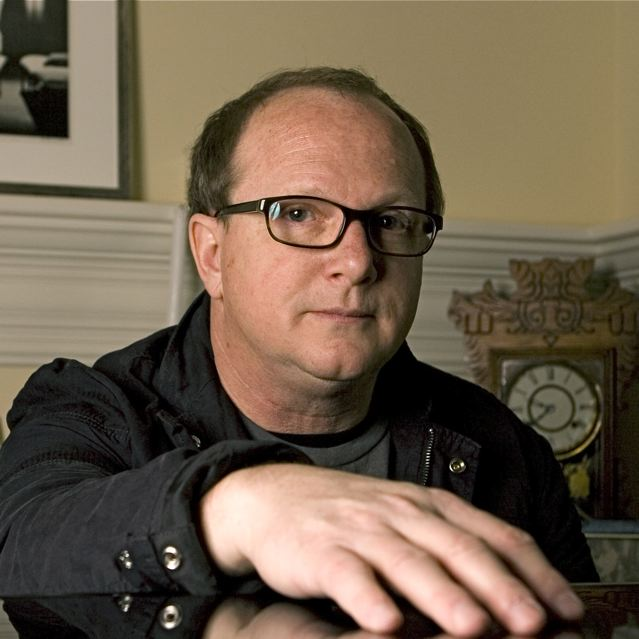
- Peacock in 2008

Background information
- Born: Charles William Ashworth; August 10, 1956 (age 70); Yuba City, California, U.S.
- Genres: Contemporary Christian, jazz, pop
- Occupations: Singer-songwriter; record producer; keyboardist; author
- Instruments: Keyboards, vocals
- Years active: 1977–present
- Labels: Exit; A&M; Island; Sparrow; re:think; Runway Network/RED
- Formerly of: Ten Out of Tenn
- Website: charliepeacock.com

Charles William Ashworth (born August 10, 1956), known professionally as Charlie Peacock, is an American singer, songwriter, pianist, record producer, and author. His albums include Love Press Ex-Curio, Arc of the Circle and No Man's Land (2012). He is the founder of re:think, an imprint that signed acts such as Switchfoot.

== Early life ==
Peacock was born in Yuba City, California, and his father was a trumpeter and educator. As a youth he was inspired by the music of John Coltrane.

In researching his family history he found out that his father's ancestors had lived in Texas and Louisiana and he is part Black, descended from the Ashworth family.

During junior and senior high Peacock received instrumental and theory instruction from his father and a local educator. Peacock, then known as Chuck Ashworth, left Yuba City High School after his junior year at the age of 16.

== Career ==
After leaving California State University, Sacramento in 1976 Peacock began playing jazz piano in the band, The Runners. He met author Frank Kofsky at California State University in Sacramento and through him met various jazz artists such as Andrew Hill.

=== 1978 to 1999 ===
In 1978, songwriter Stephen Holsapple recorded Peacock's vocal compositions and they began writing songs together. He began performing at Maurice's American Bar and his song "So Attractive" was placed with a music publisher. Vocalist and songwriter Sal Valentino asked Peacock to join his band and gave Peacock's music to his industry friends. In 1980 A&M Records signed Peacock for a demo recording with producer David Kahne.

Peacock formed The Charlie Peacock Group with Erik Kleven (bass), Jim Caselli (drums), Darius Babazadeh (tenor saxophone) and guitarist, Mark Herzig. He also recorded with David Kahne at the Automatt and at Moon Studios with Stephen Holsapple during this period and those recordings became the album Last Vestiges of Honor, released in 1998. Peacock contracted with a production imprint company called Exit Records in early 1983. That year, he performed as a keyboardist and vocalist for Vector in the band's 1983 release, Mannequin Virtue.

In 1988 Peacock, Jimmy Abegg and Ebo made up the Charlie Peacock Acoustic Trio. Through their musical efforts came the West Coast Diaries tapes.

From 1990 to 1999, Peacock produced over fifty albums in the Christian and gospel music genre and founded the record company re:think (EMI/Sparrow) and signed the artists Sarah Masen and Switchfoot. Amy Grant's 1991 single "Every Heartbeat" was co-written by Grant, Wayne Kirkpatrick and Peacock. He also had in production and played on Vince Ebo's Love Is the Better Way album that was released in 1992.

=== 2000 to present ===
On March 9, 2004, Peacock released Full Circle: A Celebration of Songs and Friends commemorating his 20-year anniversary as a solo recording artist.

In 2005 Peacock released his first commercial jazz/improvisational music CD, Love Press Ex-Curio, short for Loves Pressure Exhibits Curiosity. According to jazz critics, "while Peacock has consistently pushed the boundaries of pop and gospel music by adding elements of alternative rock, dance music and jazz, he has never before delved into jazz as unabashedly and wholeheartedly as he does on Love Press Ex-Curio".

In 2008, Peacock recorded the Arc of the Circle (Runway) with saxophonist Jeff Coffin and the album peaked at No. 2 on the CMJ Jazz Charts. The album's original tracks, were recorded at Peacock's Nashville home. The album also featured guitarist Marc Ribot, drummer Derrek Phillips, electronica player Tony Miracle, percussionist Ken Lewis, keyboardist/percussionist Chad Howat, and tuba player Joe Murphy. A review in Abstract Logix said the album contained "high-risk improvisational music" with "eclectic influences" that kept the sound "bluesy and essentially American."

A Jazz Times review described it as "an improvisational blend of modern classical and ECM-like influences".

In 2009, Peacock was the executive producer of music for the documentary Any Day Now. In 2010 he and businessman David Kiersznowski co-founded an artist development and music publishing company, Twenty Ten Music. Peacock wrote, directed and produced the film The Legend Hank Cochran and music producer/film producer/director for Brooke Waggoner's concert DVD And the World Opened Up.

He executive produced and performed on Jon Foreman's EPs Fall, Winter, Spring, and Summer.

Peacock, who had been in the audience during The Civil Wars' first ever concert, began producing the duo's music during this period. He helmed The Civil Wars' 2011 debut album Barton Hollow, which reached No. 10 on the Billboard 200 chart and No. 1 on the Billboard Digital Albums chart, sold over 800,000 copies, and won the 2012 Grammy Awards for Best Folk Album and Best Country Duo/Group Performance.

In October 2012, Peacock released No Man's Land, his first vocal project since 1999. He reunited with The Civil Wars to produce their self-titled 2013 album. Upon its debut, it became the best-selling album in America, topping the Billboard 200 chart as well as Billboard's Digital Albums and Canadian Albums charts, among others.

On January 8, 2014, he began production on American Idol Season 8 winner Kris Allen's third album at his studio in Nashville. Allen's third studio album "Horizons" was released August 12, 2014.

In late 2015, Peacock was appointed the Director of Contemporary Music and Industry Outreach at Lipscomb University's College of Arts and Entertainment in Nashville, under his given surname, Ashworth.

== Personal life ==
Peacock has been married to Andi Ashworth since the pair were teenagers. They are parents to two adult children, including Sam Ashworth.

Peacock began working with DATA and the ONE Campaign in 2002, placing co-founder Bono and ONE President David Lane in front of Nashville's artist community.

== Discography ==
- No Magazines (VAVAVA, 1982)
- Lie Down in the Grass (Exit Records, 1984)
- Lie Down in the Grass (A&M Records, 1985). "Watching Eternity" and "Human Condition" on the 1984 release, were removed and replaced by "Young in Heart" and "Love Doesn't Get Better".
- Charlie Peacock (Island Records/Exit Records, 1986)
- West Coast Diaries: Vol. 1 (Jamz Ltd, 1988)
- West Coast Diaries: Vol. 2 (Jamz Ltd, 1989)
- West Coast Diaries: Vol. 3 (Jamz Ltd, 1989)
- The Secret of Time (Sparrow Records, 1990)
- Love Life (Sparrow Records, 1991)
- West Coast Diaries: Vol. 1–3 (Sparrow Records, 1991)
- Everything That's on My Mind (Sparrow Records, 1994)
- ...in the light (re:think, 1996)
- Strangelanguage (re:think/EMI, 1996)
- Live in the Netherlands (CP Collector Series, 1998)
- Last Vestiges of Honor (CP Collector Series, 1998). Recorded by The Charlie Peacock Group in 1981 (a 12-inch single of two songs was released in California and Japan in 1981).
- Kingdom Come (re:think/EMI CMG, 1999)
- Full Circle (Sparrow Records, 2004)
- Love Press Ex-Curio (Runway Network/Emergent/RED, 2005)
- Arc of the Circle (Runway Network, 2008) with Jeff Coffin
- No Man's Land (2012)
- Lemonade (2014)
- When Light Flashes Help Is on the Way (2018)
- Lil' Willie (2019)
- She Sang for Me, Vol. 1 (2019), with Les Chanteuses
- Skin and Wind (2021)
- EVERY KIND OF UH-OH (2024)
- The Kahne Sessions 1980-81 (2025)

== Books and publications ==
- Roots and Rhythm: A Life in Music. (Grand Rapids, MI: William B. Eerdmans Publishing Company, 2025). ISBN 978-0802884374
- Why Everything That Doesn't Matter, Matters So Much: The Way of Love in a World of Hurt. With Andi Ashworth. (Nashville, TN: Thomas Nelson, 2024). ISBN 978-1400337644
- At the Crossroads. Revised and Expanded Edition. With Molly Nicholas. (Colorado Springs, CO: Shaw at Waterbrook Press/Random House, 2004). ISBN 978-0-87788-128-5
- New Way to Be Human: A Provocative Look at What It Means to Follow Jesus (Colorado Springs, CO: Shaw at Waterbrook Press/Random House, 2004). ISBN 978-0-87788-071-4
- At the Crossroads (Nashville, TN: Broadman & Holman Publishers, 1999).

=== Chapters in books ===
- "Taking it Personally", The aWAKE Project : Uniting against the African AIDS Crisis (Nashville, TN: W Publishing Group, 2002)
- "Making Art Like a True Artist", It Was Good: Making Art to the Glory of God (Baltimore, MD: Square Halo Books, 2000)
- "The Bright Life", City on a Hill (Nashville, TN: CCM Books: Harvest House Publishers, 2000).
- "God Sends a Saxophonist", Ragamuffin Prayers (Nashville, TN: CCM Books: Harvest House Publishers, 2000)
- "High and Holy Calling", More Like the Master (Chicago, IL: Cornerstone Press, 1996)
- "An Apologetic from the Christian Music Industry to the Church", A Distant Harmony: The Papers of the Hearn Symposium on Christian Music (Waco, TX: Baylor University, 2003)
- "The Creative Christian Life", AGMA Music Curriculum: Tools for Ministry and Career (Nashville, TN: GMA, 1999)
