= Jon Foreman =

American musician (born 1976)

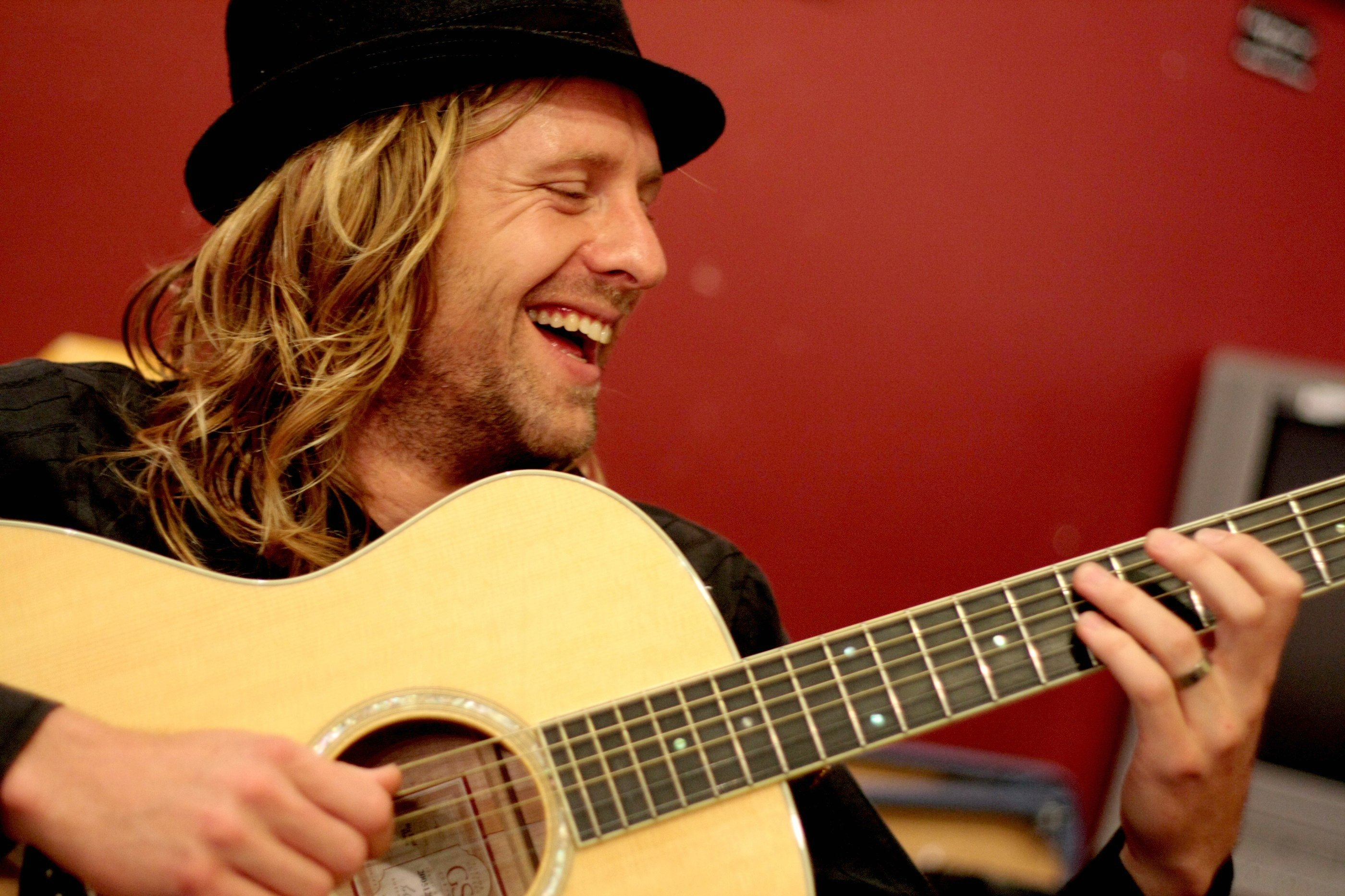
- Jon Foreman in April 2008

Background information
- Born: Jonathan Mark Foreman; October 22, 1976 (age 49); San Bernardino County, California, U.S.
- Genres: Folk rock, gospel
- Occupations: Singer-songwriter, guitarist
- Instruments: Vocals, guitar, harmonica, cello, keyboards
- Years active: 1996–present
- Labels: lowercase people; Capitol CMG; Credential
- Member of: Switchfoot, Fiction Family
- Website: jonforeman.com

Jonathan Mark Foreman (born October 22, 1976) is an American musician who is the lead singer, guitarist, primary songwriter, and co-founder of the alternative rock band Switchfoot. As a solo act, Foreman has released 14 extended plays and two studio albums.

== Personal life ==
Foreman was born in San Bernardino County, California, but his family moved to Massachusetts and Virginia Beach during his childhood. There he became fast friends with Todd Cooper, who encouraged him to learn guitar. Cooper was later a guitar tech for the band Switchfoot, although he left in 2005 to pursue his own musical career.

After several years, Foreman and his family moved back to Southern California, this time settling in Encinitas. He graduated from San Dieguito Academy in the North County Coastal area of San Diego, California. Foreman attended UC San Diego and later dropped out to follow his singing career.

Foreman married Emily Masen in 2002, and the couple had a daughter in 2012. The couple welcomed their second child, a son, in June 2018.

One of Foreman's favorite pastimes is surfing, and when not on tour, he resides in Cardiff-by-the-Sea, a beach community in Encinitas.

Foreman is a committed nondenominational Christian; however, his goal with Switchfoot has always been to make music for all people. "For us, these songs are for everyone. Calling us 'Christian rock' tends to be a box that closes some people out and excludes them. And that's not what we're trying to do. Music has always opened my mind — and that's what we want."

Foreman's father, Mark, served as the senior pastor of North Coast Calvary Chapel in Carlsbad, California. His mother is Jan (née Carlton).

== Influences ==
Foreman cites Elliott Smith, U2, The Police, James Taylor, The Beatles, Radiohead, J.S. Bach, Ronny Jordan, Miles Davis, Keith Green, Nirvana, Johnny Cash, Bob Dylan, and Led Zeppelin as some of his musical influences. In 2001, he was awarded the "Les Paul Horizon Award" for the most promising up-and-coming guitarist at the annual Orville H. Gibson Guitar Awards in Los Angeles.

== Side projects ==
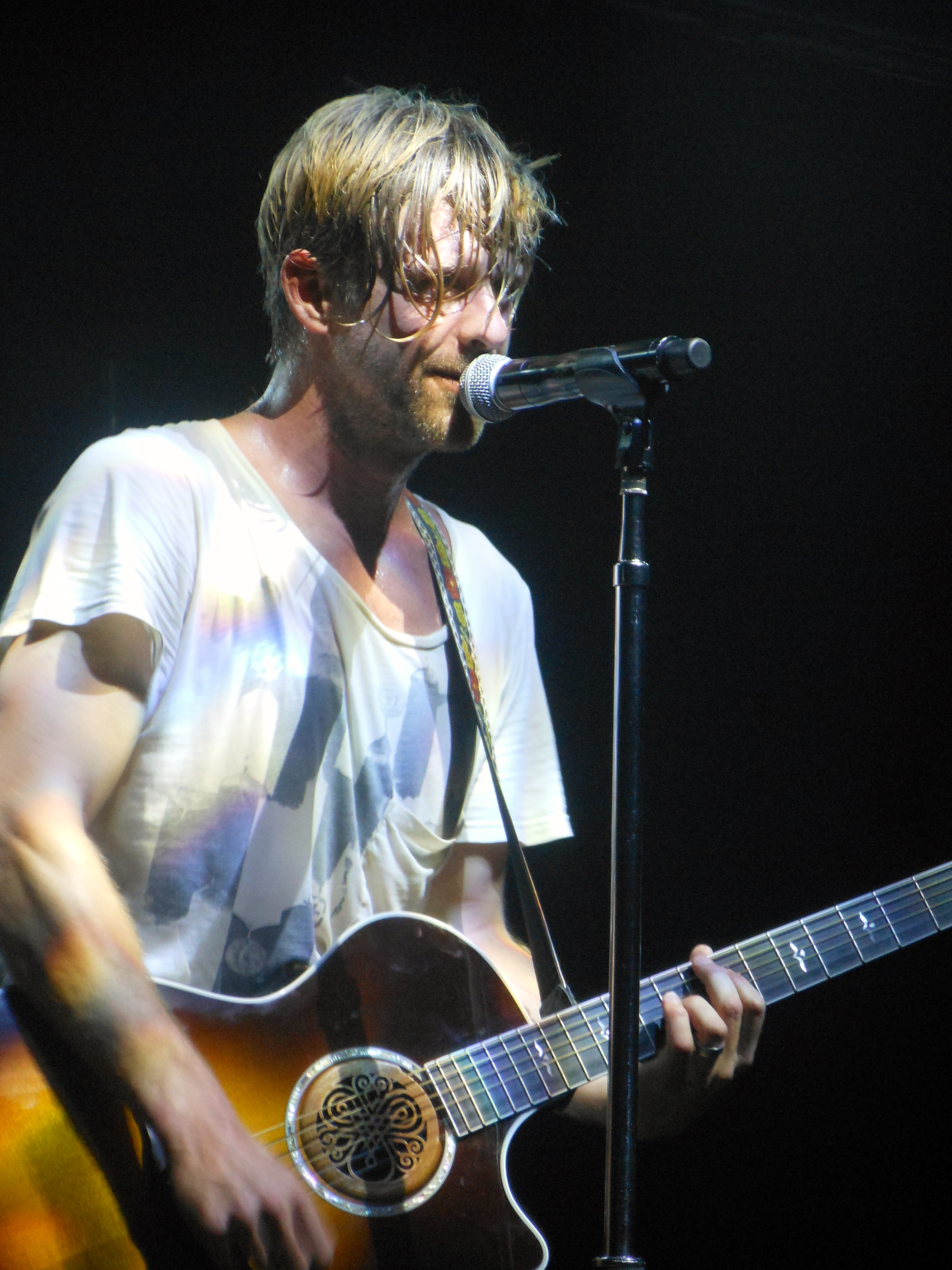
Jon Foreman performing with Switchfoot in 2015

Foreman has made musical contributions away from Switchfoot, including writing with Molly Jenson. He appeared on the song "Deathbed" on Relient K's 2007 album, Five Score and Seven Years Ago. In September 2009, Jazz musician Karl Denson released the album "Brother's Keeper," on which two songs were co-written by Foreman, and one song, "Drums of War," was solely written by Foreman, which he also sang on. He wrote "Running Away from Me" for Meat Loaf's 2010 album Hang Cool Teddy Bear. Foreman collaborated with Ryan O'Neal for the Sleeping at Last song "Birthright." Foreman has also contributed to the books The Art of Being and New Way to be Human, the latter written by producer Charlie Peacock.

=== Fiction Family ===
In 2006, Foreman and Nickel Creek member Sean Watkins started collaborating on a duo project originally called "The Real SeanJon", which was later renamed "Fiction Family." Their self-titled debut, Fiction Family, was released on January 20, 2009.

"The album was recorded and written in parts because Nickel Creek and Switchfoot are both hard working, touring acts, we were rarely home from tour at the same time," said Foreman. "Consequently the tracks were passed back and forth between Sean and I. Whoever was home from tour would chip away at the songs with no real expectations at all, mainly just for ourselves and for the love of the song I suppose. We came up with a few cowboy rules for the project: No double tracking. No pussyfooting. No tuning of vocals."

In November 2012, the band released an extended play titled Holiday EP. Their second studio album, Fiction Family Reunion, was released on January 29, 2013.

=== Solo projects ===
Foreman has also worked on various solo projects, independently releasing four EPs, titled Fall, Winter, Spring, and Summer, released by Credential Recordings and lowercase people records. In October 2008, Foreman released Limbs and Branches, a collection of songs from the EPs along with two new tracks. In April 2009, he was GMA Dove Award-nominated for Male Vocalist of the Year.

In 2015, Foreman released the EPs Sunlight, Shadows, Darkness and Dawn, which contain 25 songs; one for each hour of the day with one extra. Each song was produced by a different producer, with Foreman sending in tracks recorded backstage while on tour. They were mixed by Future of Forestry's Eric Owyoung.

Foreman's debut solo album Departures was released in February 2021. The album featured collaborations with Lauren Daigle & Madison Cunningham.

== Songwriting style ==
Foreman's songwriting tends to be very dynamic, and he often employs a wide range of different instrumentation, including, but not limited to: guitar, violin, cello, trumpet, mandolin, sitar, flute, saxophone, clarinet, synthesizer, piano, miscellaneous percussion, and harmonica. Foreman has always aimed to use interesting instrumentation when writing for Switchfoot, mostly on some of the band's first albums such as The Legend of Chin, New Way to Be Human, and Learning to Breathe.

== Solo discography ==
=== Studio albums ===
List of studio albums, with selected chart positions and certifications
Title	Album details	Peak chart positions	
Title	Album details	US Current	US Christ.
Departures	Released: February 12, 2021; Label: lowercase people/Capitol CMG; Format: Digital download, streaming	60	12
In Bloom	Releases: May 31, 2024; Label: lowercase people/Capitol CMG; Format: Digital download, streaming	—	—

=== Extended plays ===
List of extended plays, with selected chart positions and certifications
Title	Album details	Peak chart positions				
Title	Album details	US	US Christ.	US Alt.	US Rock	US Folk
Fall	Released: November 20, 2007; Label: Credential Recordings; Format: Digital download	—	—	—	—	—
Winter	Released: January 15, 2008; Label: Credential; Format: Digital download	—	—	—	—	—
Spring	Released: March 25, 2008; Label: lowercase people/Credential; Format: Digital download	— (Note: Spring (EP) did not enter the Billboard 200, but peaked at number 14 on the Top Digital Albums chart.)	—	—	—	—
Summer	Released: June 10, 2008; Label: Credential; Format: Digital download	162	6	—	—	—
The Wonderlands: Sunlight	Released: May 26, 2015; Label: lowercase people; Formats: Digital download	104	2	9	11	2
The Wonderlands: Shadows	Released: July 17, 2015; Label: lowercase people; Format: Digital download	— (Note: The Wonderlands: Shadows (EP) did not enter the Billboard 200, but peaked at number 89 on the Top Current Albums chart.)	4	20	26	8
The Wonderlands: Darkness	Released: September 4, 2015; Label: lowercase people; Format: Digital download	— (Note: The Wonderlands: Darkness (EP) did not enter the Billboard 200, but peaked at number 99 on the Top Album Sales chart.)	7	22	30	3
The Wonderlands: Dawn	Released: October 23, 2015; Label: lowercase people; Format: Digital download	—	11	—	35	6
25 IN 24	Released: March 30, 2016; Label: lowercase people; Format: Digital download	—	—	—	—	—
Doubt	Released: November 24, 2020; Label: lowercase people; Format: Digital download	—	—	—	—	—
Love	Released: December 1, 2020; Label: lowercase people; Format: Digital download	—	—	—	—	—
Fear	Released: December 8, 2020; Label: lowercase people; Format: Digital download	—	—	—	—	—
Belief	Released: December 16, 2020; Label: lowercase people; Format: Digital download	—	—	—	—	—
Departures (EP)	Released: January 8, 2021; Label: lowercase people; Format: Digital download	—	—	—	—	—

=== Box sets / compilation albums ===
List of studio albums, with selected chart positions and certifications
Title	Album details	Peak chart positions	
Title	Album details	US Christ.	US Heat.
Fall & Winter	Released: January 15, 2008; Label: Credential; Formats: CD, vinyl	33	24
Spring & Summer	Released: June 24, 2008; Label: Credential; Formats: CD, vinyl	34	—
Limbs and Branches	Released: October 28, 2008; Label: Credential; Formats: CD, digital download	36	—
The Wonderlands: Sunlight & Shadows	label: lowercase people; Formats: CD	—	—
The Wonderlands: Darkness & Dawn	label: lowercase people; Formats: CD	—	—

=== Singles ===
Year	Title	Peak chart positions	Album
Year	Title	US Christ. AC	Album
2007	"The Cure for Pain"	—	Fall (EP)
2008	"Your Love Is Strong"	—	Spring (EP)
2015	"Caroline"	—	The Wonderlands: Sunlight (EP)
2016	"Your Love Is Enough (The Inland Mix)"	12 (Note: Chart peaks are for the original version.)	non-album single
2021	"Side By Side" (featuring Madison Cunningham)	—	Departures

*Original version is on The Wonderlands: Shadows (EP)

=== Other appearances ===
- "Someday We'll Know" (New Radicals cover with Mandy Moore) – Sony – A Walk to Remember Soundtrack (2002)
- "Mortal" - "Mytho X (Greene Edit)" - 'Nu En Jin' (2002)
- "Desire" – Noise Ratchet's Noise Ratchet [EP] (2003)
- "Spirit" – X Worship 2006 (Switchfoot) (2005)
- "Deathbed" – Relient K's Five Score and Seven Years Ago (2007)
- "Do You Only Love The Ones Who Look Like You" – Molly Jenson's Maybe Tomorrow (2009)
- "Your Cheatin' Heart" (Hank Williams cover) – Sony/ATV Nashville Classic Covers: Volume One
- "Birthright" – Sleeping at Last's March EP (2011)
- "O Holy Night" - The Eagle and Child's Christmas, Volume II – EP (2017)
- "When the Walls Come Crashing Down" – Colony House (2020)
- "Don't Know If I Believe It" – Judah. (2020)
- "YOUR LOVE IS STRONG (live from the holy city)" - Brandon Lake (2024)
