= Credential Recordings =

- Parent company: EMI CMG
- Genre: Indie rock, Christian rock
- Country of origin: United States
- Location: Nashville, Tennessee

Credential Recordings is a pop and rock record label in Nashville, Tennessee. The label branched out after a distribution agreement with Lowercase People Records for Switchfoot singer Jon Foreman's solo EPs, which tend to be more folk-acoustic in style. They also have agreements with the label to release its Switchfoot and Fiction Family releases to the Christian market.

== Roster ==
=== Present ===
- Jon Foreman (since 2007)
- Fiction Family (since 2009, distribution agreement only)
- The New Respects (since 2016)

=== Past ===
- Dizmas (Moved to Forefront Records, then went on hiatus)
- Edison Glass (Disbanded)
- Future of Forestry (Active, currently unsigned)
- Lost Ocean (Active, currently unsigned)
- Sixpence None the Richer (Active, currently unsigned)
- Turn Off the Stars (Disbanded)
- Patty Griffin (currently with New West Records)
- Seabird (Active, currently Independent)

== Compilation albums ==
- Stereocilia Vol. 1 (June 10, 2006)
- The Tour EP (January 23, 2007)

== Lowercase People Records ==
Credential Recordings handles the distribution for Switchfoot frontman Jon Foreman's solo EPs under an exclusive partnership with the band's label, Lowercase people records.

== See also ==
- List of record labels
