= Lowercase People Records =

- Founded: 2007
- Founder: Switchfoot
- Distributors: By Design (for Switchfoot releases), Credential/Capitol CMG (primarily for Jon Foreman releases)
- Genre: Alternative rock, acoustic rock, pop rock
- Country of origin: United States
- Location: San Diego, California
- Official website: www.lowercasepeople.com

Lowercase People Records (stylized lowercase people records) is the record label founded and run by the members of the band Switchfoot. It was founded after the band split with their major label, Columbia/Sony BMG. The label's name was drawn from the lyrics of the song "Company Car" from the album New Way to be Human.

== Formation ==
In October 2007, Jon Foreman announced on Switchfoot's official YouTube account page the formation of lowercase people records. This development came about some time after the band cut ties with their major label, Columbia Records.

Our goal was to remove the corporate barrier between our audience and our songs. Musically, we wanted to go places we've never been before. We wanted to put out a more diverse collection of musical projects with more artistic control. Since music plays such a crucial role of connecting people with important issues around the world, we wanted to be a part of a label that gives directly to social justice causes, one that is more eco friendly. lowercase people records is our attempt to do all of this and more.

lowercase people is our attempt to better serve this community that has supported us through the years without a middle man in the way. As a band, this is the dream of a lifetime: to have no boundaries in our songs or in the ways that they are presented. So here's what you can expect ... Over the course of the next few months we are going to release several diverse projects culminating in a new Switchfoot release that will redefine who we are in a new independent era.

== First Release: Rebuild ==
On November 1, 2007, lowercase people records released its first song, "Rebuild", a song written by Switchfoot's Jon Foreman and Relient K's Matt Thiessen for their 2007 Appetite for Construction Tour. It was offered as a free download, with options to donate either time or money to Habitat for Humanity.

== Distribution ==
lowercase people records has deals in place with By Design Music to distribute Switchfoot records and Credential Recordings/Capitol CMG to distribute Jon Foreman and Switchfoot releases to CCM. Both labels work simultaneously under the banner company lowercase people records.

== Artists ==
Artists currently "signed" to lowercase people records are:

- Switchfoot
- Jon Foreman
- Fiction Family
