= Regina Spektor discography =

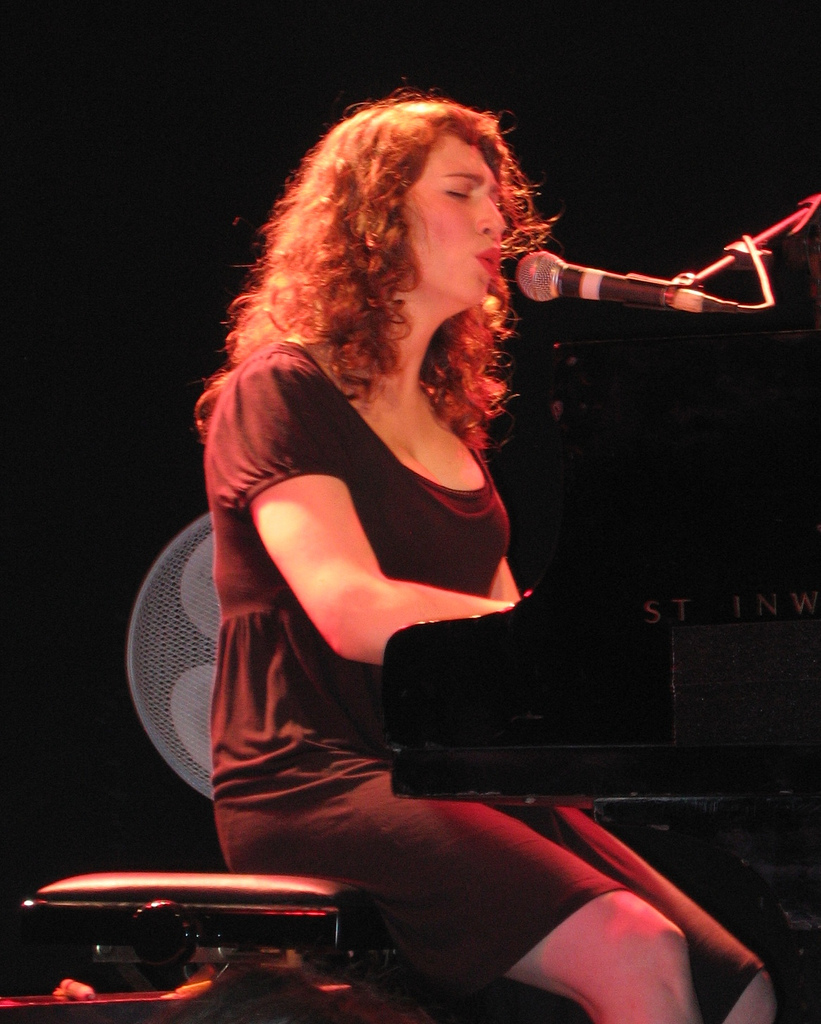
- Regina Spektor at her first performance in Tel Aviv, Israel on March 3, 2007
- Studio albums: 8
- Extended plays: 4
- Live albums: 2
- Compilation albums: 1
- Singles: 26
- Other appearances: 23

The discography of Regina Spektor, a Russian-American anti-folk musician, consists of eight studio albums, four extended plays, two live albums, and twenty-six singles.

Spektor's first two albums were released exclusively in the United States; Soviet Kitsch, Begin to Hope, Far and What We Saw from the Cheap Seats were released worldwide. The compilation Mary Ann Meets the Gravediggers and Other Short Stories, containing songs from Spektor's first three albums, was assembled for the UK market.

== Albums ==
=== Studio albums ===
Title	Album details	Peak chart positions								Sales	Certifications (sales thresholds)
Title	Album details	US	AUS	BEL	CAN	IRE	NZ	SWE	UK	Sales	Certifications (sales thresholds)
11:11	Released: July 9, 2001; Label: Self-released; Format: CD	—	—	—	—	—	—	—	—		
Songs	Released: February 25, 2002; Label: Self-released; Format: CD	—	—	—	—	—	—	—	—		
Soviet Kitsch	Released: August 17, 2004; Label: Sire, Shoplifter, WEA; Format: CD, vinyl, download	—	—	—	—	—	—	—	—	US: 156,210	
Begin to Hope	Released: June 13, 2006; Label: Sire; Format: CD, vinyl, download	20	29	40	—	18	10	18	53	US: 709,264	ARIA: Gold; BPI: Gold; RIAA: Platinum; RMNZ: Gold
Far	Released: June 23, 2009; Label: Sire; Format: CD, vinyl, download	3	10	25	13	24	38	8	30	US: 262,502	ARIA: Gold; BPI: Silver; RIAA: Gold
What We Saw from the Cheap Seats	Released: May 29, 2012; Label: Sire; Format: CD, vinyl, download	3	9	34	12	26	—	23	24	US: 174,000	
Remember Us to Life	Released: September 30, 2016; Label: Sire; Format: CD, vinyl, download	23	20	68	64	—	—	—	47		
Home, Before and After	Released: June 24, 2022; Label: Sire; Format: CD, download	—	—	—	—	—	—	—	—		
"—" denotes albums that did not chart.

=== Live albums ===
Title	Album details	Sales
Live in London	Released: November 22, 2010; Label: Sire	US: 18,846
Live on Soundstage	Released: March 17, 2017; Label: Sire	

=== Compilation albums ===
Title	Album details	Peak chart positions
Title	Album details	UK
Mary Ann Meets the Gravediggers and Other Short Stories	Released: January 16, 2006; Label: Transgressive	185

== Extended plays ==
Title	EP details
Live at Bull Moose	Released: August 23, 2005; Label: Sire
Live in California 2006 EP	Released: February 27, 2007; Label: Sire
Laughing With	Released: June 9, 2009; Label: Sire
iTunes Live from Soho	Released: October 2, 2009; Label: Sire

== Singles ==
Year	Single	Peak chart positions								Sales	Certifications (sales thresholds)	Album
Year	Single	US	AUS	BEL	CAN	IRE	NZ	SWE	UK	Sales	Certifications (sales thresholds)	Album
2004	"Modern Girls & Old Fashioned Men" (with The Strokes)	—	—	—	—	—	—	—	—			Non-album single
2004	"Carbon Monoxide"	—	—	—	—	—	—	—	—			Soviet Kitsch
2004	"Your Honor / The Flowers"	—	—	—	—	—	—	—	105			Soviet Kitsch
2006	"Us"	—	—	—	—	—	—	—	81	US: 86,000	RIAA: Gold	Soviet Kitsch
2006	"On the Radio"	—	—	60	—	—	—	—	60	US: 116,000		Begin to Hope
2006	"Fidelity"	51	50	—	—	—	16	—	45	US: 761,000	RIAA: Platinum	Begin to Hope
2007	"Hotel Song"	—	—	—	—	16	—	—	—	US: 57,000		Begin to Hope
2007	"Samson"	—	—	30	—	—	—	29	174	US: 143,000	RIAA: Gold	Begin to Hope
2007	"Better"	—	—	—	—	—	—	—	—	US: 82,000		Begin to Hope
2007	"My Dear Acquaintance (A Happy New Year)"	—	—	—	—	—	—	—	—			Non-album single
2009	"Laughing With"	—	—	34	—	—	—	—	—			Far
2009	"Eet"	—	79	—	—	—	—	—	—			Far
2009	"The Call"	—	—	—	—	—	—	—	—			The Chronicles of Narnia: Prince Caspian
2010	"No Surprises"	—	96	—	84	—	—	—	—			Non-album single
2012	"All the Rowboats"	—	91	—	—	—	—	—	—			What We Saw from the Cheap Seats
2012	"Don't Leave Me (Ne Me Quitte Pas)"	—	—	69	—	—	—	—	—			What We Saw from the Cheap Seats
2012	"How"	—	—	—	—	—	—	—	—			What We Saw from the Cheap Seats
2013	"You've Got Time"	—	—	—	—	—	—	—	—	US: 60,000		Music from Orange Is the New Black
2016	"Bleeding Heart"	—	—	—	—	—	—	—	—			Remember Us to Life
2016	"Small Bill$"	—	—	—	—	—	—	—	—			Remember Us to Life
2016	"Black and White"	—	—	—	—	—	—	—	—			Remember Us to Life
2016	"Older and Taller"	—	—	—	—	—	—	—	—			Remember Us to Life
2016	"While My Guitar Gently Weeps"	—	—	—	—	—	—	—	—			Non-album singles
2018	"Birdsong"	—	—	—	—	—	—	—	—			Non-album singles
2019	"Walking Away" (from Modern Love)	—	—	—	—	—	—	—	—			Non-album singles
2022	"Becoming All Alone"	—	—	—	—	—	—	—	—			Home, Before and After
2022	"Up the Mountain"	—	—	—	—	—	—	—	—			Home, Before and After
2022	"Loveology"	—	—	—	—	—	—	—	—			Home, Before and After
"—" denotes singles that did not chart.

=== Other certified songs ===
Year	Single	Certifications (sales thresholds)	Album
2009	"Two Birds"	RIAA: Gold	Far

== Other appearances ==
=== Compilation appearances ===
Year	Song(s)	Album	Label(s)	Sales
2000	"Mockingbird"	Public Domain	Purchase Records	
2007	"Real Love"	Instant Karma: The Amnesty International Campaign to Save Darfur	Warner Bros. Records; Amnesty International	US: 31,000
2008	"The Call"	The Chronicles of Narnia: Prince Caspian Soundtrack	Walt Disney Records	
2008	"Fidelity"	Revolutions in Sound: Warner Bros. Records - The First 50 Years	Warner Bros.	
2008	"Better"	Songs for Tibet: The Art of Peace	The Art of Peace Foundation	
2009	"Us" "Hero"	500 Days of Summer Soundtrack	Sire Records; London Records; Rhino Records	
2009	"Better"	My Sister's Keeper Soundtrack	New Line Records	
2010	"Hotel Song"	Wild Target Soundtrack	Epic Records	
2013	"Blood of Eden"	And I'll Scratch Yours (covers of Peter Gabriel songs)	Real World Records	
2013	"You've Got Time"	Music from Orange Is the New Black	Sire Records	
2016	"While My Guitar Gently Weeps"	Kubo and the Two Strings Soundtrack	Warner Bros. Records	
2016	"Dear Theodosia" (with Ben Folds)	The Hamilton Mixtape	Atlantic Records	
2019	"One Little Soldier"	Bombshell Soundtrack	Warner Records	

=== Collaborations ===
Year	Collaborating artist(s)	Album	Song(s)	Label(s)
2002	Anders Griffen	All Over the Place	"Kids", "All Is Love"	Olive Juice Records
2003	Anders Griffen	Ox	"Sunset"	Independent
2004	Kimya Dawson	Hidden Vagenda	"Fire", "Moving On"	K Records
2004	The Strokes	"Reptilia" (single)	"Modern Girls & Old Fashion Men"	RCA Records
2005	Jenny Owen Youngs	Batten the Hatches	"Voice on Tape"	Self-released/Nettwerk
2007	The Arrow	Quodia	"Water Woman"	7D Media
2007	Sondre Lerche	Dan in Real Life (soundtrack)	"Hell No"	Touchstone Pictures
2008	Ben Folds	Way to Normal	"You Don't Know Me"	Epic Records
2009	Joshua Bell	At Home With Friends	"Left Hand Song"	Sony Music Entertainment
2009	Nickel Eye	The Time of the Assassins	"Where the Cold Wind Blows"	Rykodisc
2011	Thomas Dolby	A Map of the Floating City	"Evil Twin Brother"	Lost Toy People
2012	Only Son	Searchlight	"Call Them Brothers"	Warner Music Group
2017	ODESZA	A Moment Apart	"Just A Memory"	Counter; Ninja Tune; Foreign Family Collective
2017	Gogol Bordello	Seekers and Finders	"Seekers and Finders"	Cooking Vinyl
