= List of songs recorded by Regina Spektor =

The following is a list of songs written or performed by anti folk artist Regina Spektor.

== Spektor as lead artist and songwriter (115) ==
Title	Album
"Love Affair"	11:11
"Rejazz"	11:11
"Back of a Truck"	11:11
"Buildings"	11:11
"Mary Ann"	11:11
"Flyin'"	11:11
"Wasteside"	11:11
"Pavlov's Daughter"	11:11
"2.99 Cent Blues"	11:11
"Braille"	11:11
"I Want to Sing"	11:11
"Sunshine"	11:11
"Samson"	Songs
"Oedipus"	Songs
"Prisoners"	Songs
"Reading Time with Pickle"	Songs
"Consequence of Sounds"	Songs
"Daniel Cowman"	Songs
"Bon Idée"	Songs
"Aching to Pupate"	Songs
"Lounge"	Songs
"Lacrimosa"	Songs
"Lulliby"	Songs
"Ne Me Quitte Pas"	Songs
"Ode to Divorce"	Soviet Kitsch
"Poor Little Rich Boy"	Soviet Kitsch
"Carbon Monoxide"	Soviet Kitsch
"The Flowers"	Soviet Kitsch
"Us"	Soviet Kitsch
"Sailor Song"	Soviet Kitsch
"Your Honor"	Soviet Kitsch
"Ghost of Corporate Future"	Soviet Kitsch
"Chemo Limo"	Soviet Kitsch
"Somedays"	Soviet Kitsch
"Scarecrow and Fungus"	Us (single)
"December"	Us (single)
"Ain't No Cover"	Live at Bull Moose
"Pound of Flesh"	Live at Bull Moose
"The Noise"	Live at Bull Moose
"Fidelity"	Begin to Hope
"Better"	Begin to Hope
"On the Radio"	Begin to Hope
"Field Below"	Begin to Hope
"Hotel Song"	Begin to Hope
"Après Moi"	Begin to Hope
"20 Years of Snow"	Begin to Hope
"That Time"	Begin to Hope
"Edit"	Begin to Hope
"Lady"	Begin to Hope
"Summer in the City"	Begin to Hope
"Another Town"	Begin to Hope (Special Edition)
"Uh-Merica"	Begin to Hope (Special Edition)
"Baobabs"	Begin to Hope (Special Edition)
"Düsseldorf"	Begin to Hope (Special Edition)
"Music Box"	Begin to Hope (Special Edition)
"Hero"	Begin to Hope (iTunes Version)
"Bartender"	Begin to Hope (iTunes Version)
"Baby Jesus"	Begin to Hope (10th Anniversary Edition)
"The Call"	The Chronicles of Narnia: Prince Caspian (soundtrack)
"The Calculation"	Far
"Eet"	Far
"Blue Lips"	Far
"Folding Chair"	Far
"Machine"	Far
"Laughing With"	Far
"Human of the Year"	Far
"Two Birds"	Far
"Dance Anthem of the '80s"	Far
"Genius Next Door"	Far
"Wallet"	Far
"One More Time with Feeling"	Far
"Man of a Thousand Faces"	Far
"Time is All Around"	Far (Special Edition)
"The Sword and the Pen"	Far (Special Edition)
"Riot Gear"	Far (Special Edition)
"Love, You're a Whore"	Live in London
"Silly Eye-Color Generalizations"	Live in London
"Bobbing for Apples"	Live in London
"Small Town Moon"	What We Saw from the Cheap Seats
"Oh Marcello"	What We Saw from the Cheap Seats
"Firewood"	What We Saw from the Cheap Seats
"Patron Saint"	What We Saw from the Cheap Seats
"How"	What We Saw from the Cheap Seats
"All the Rowboats"	What We Saw from the Cheap Seats
"Ballad of a Politician"	What We Saw from the Cheap Seats
"Open"	What We Saw from the Cheap Seats
"The Party"	What We Saw from the Cheap Seats
"Jessica"	What We Saw from the Cheap Seats
"You've Got Time"	Orange Is the New Black (soundtrack)
"Bleeding Heart"	Remember Us to Life
"Older and Taller"	Remember Us to Life
"Grand Hotel"	Remember Us to Life
"Small Bill$"	Remember Us to Life
"Black and White"	Remember Us to Life
"The Light"	Remember Us to Life
"The Trapper and the Furrier"	Remember Us to Life
"Tornadoland"	Remember Us to Life
"Obsolete"	Remember Us to Life
"Sellers of Flowers"	Remember Us to Life
"The Visit"	Remember Us to Life
"New Year"	Remember Us to Life (Deluxe Edition)
"The One Who Stayed and the One Who Left"	Remember Us to Life (Deluxe Edition)
"End of Thought"	Remember Us to Life (Deluxe Edition)
"Birdsong"	The Romanoffs (soundtrack)
"Walking Away"	Modern Love (soundtrack)
"One Little Soldier"	Bombshell (soundtrack)
"Becoming All Alone"	Home, Before and After
"Up the Mountain"	Home, Before and After
"One Man's Prayer"	Home, Before and After
"Raindrops"	Home, Before and After
"SugarMan"	Home, Before and After
"What Might've Been"	Home, Before and After
"Spacetime Fairytale"	Home, Before and After
"Coin"	Home, Before and After
"Loveology"	Home, Before and After
"Through a Door"	Home, Before and After

In Soviet Kitsch, there is a brief spoken word piece titled “Whisper”, in which Spektor and her brother, Barry (Bear) Spektor, discuss the following song on the album ("Your Honor").

Two tracks from Songs were later re-recorded and re-released by Spektor. The first, "Samson", also appeared in Begin to Hope. The second, "Ne Me Quitte Pas", was featured in What We Saw from the Cheap Seats, retitled as "Don't Leave Me (Ne Me Quitte Pas)". Unlike the 2002 version, which featured only Spektor and the piano, the 2012 one also includes a drum machine, horns and brass instruments.

A third version of "Ne Me Quitte Pas" was also released online, keeping the new, multi-instrument production, but replacing the English verses with Russian lyrics. The new rendition was titled "Не Покидай Меня".

Two of the tracks from Home, Before and After were previously only available through unofficial sources. "Raindrops" was an unreleased demo and "Loveology" was only performed live.

== Spektor as featured artist (13) ==
Songs on this list feature Regina Spektor working with other artists. Most of them were not released by her.

Title	Co-Artist	Album
"All is Love"	Anders Griffen	All Over the Place
"Kids"	Anders Griffen	All Over the Place
"Sunset"	Anders Griffen	Ox
"Fire"	Kimya Dawson	Hidden Vagenda
"Moving On" (piano)	Kimya Dawson	Hidden Vagenda
"Modern Girls & Old Fashion Men"	The Strokes	Reptilia (single B-side)
"Voice on Tape"	Jenny Owen Youngs	Batten the Hatches
"Hell No"	Sondre Lerche	Dan in Real Life (soundtrack)
"You Don't Know Me"	Ben Folds	Way to Normal
"Left-Hand Song"	Joshua Bell	At Home with Friends
"Where the Cold Wind Blows" (piano)	Nickel Eye	The Time of the Assassins
"Call Them Brothers"	Only Son/Jack Dishel	What We Saw from the Cheap Seats (iTunes Version)
"Live a Lie"	thenewno2	EP002
"Just A Memory"	ODESZA	A Moment Apart

Spektor has also recorded spoken introductions for the songs in The Crimea's album Secrets of the Witching Hour, as well as a guest narration for Quodia's album The Arrow.

== Cover songs officially released (13) ==
Title	Album	Original Artist
"Mockingbird"	Public Domain	Standard
"My Man" (medley)	Live at Bull Moose	Standard
"Little Boxes"	Weeds (soundtrack)	Malvina Reynolds
"My Dear Acquaintance (A Happy New Year)"	My Dear Acquaintance (A Happy New Year) (single)	Peggy Lee
"Real Love"	Instant Karma: The Amnesty International Campaign to Save Darfur	John Lennon
"No Surprises"	No Surprises (single)	Radiohead
"My Man"	Boardwalk Empire Volume 1: Music From the HBO Original Series	Standard
"The Prayer of François Villon (Molitva)"	What We Saw from the Cheap Seats (iTunes Version)	Bulat Okudzhava
"Old Jacket (Stariy Pidjak)"	What We Saw from the Cheap Seats (iTunes Version)	Bulat Okudzhava
"Love Me or Leave Me"	Boardwalk Empire Volume 3: Music from the HBO Original Series	Walter Donaldson and Gus Kahn
"Blood of Eden"	And I'll Scratch Yours	Peter Gabriel
"While My Guitar Gently Weeps"	Kubo and the Two Strings (soundtrack)	George Harrison
"And Your Bird Can Sing"	Beat Bugs (soundtrack)	The Beatles

== Unreleased demos (14) ==
- "A Cannon"
- "Ave Maria"
- "Back In"
- "BYOS (Bring Your Own Shovel)"
- "Chicken Song"
- "Cinderella"
- "Dead of Night"
- "I Cut Off My Hair"
- "Just Like the Movies"
- "Paris"
- "Pure Perfection"
- "Rockland County"
- "School is Out"
- "The Soup"

Six songs from this collection came from a cassette tape that was auctioned online in 2007. The track list is 1. Chicken Song, 2. Braille, 3. Love Affair, 4. Cinderella, 5. School is Out and 6. Sunshine. Regina gave the tape to a family friend who was in the music business.

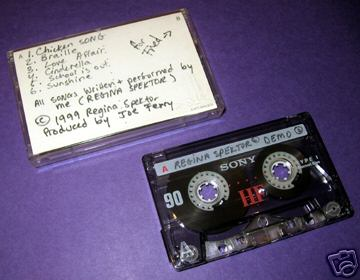

== Unreleased live songs (39) ==
- "8th Floor"
- "AB"
- "Amplifiers"
- "Aquarius"
- "Be Like a Cloud"
- "Bear Spektor"
- "Begin to Hope"
- "Belt"
- "The Big Towns"
- "The Bronx"
- "By the Time You Read This Letter"
- "The Clocks Were Asleep"
- "A Cooler Version of Yourself"
- "Cradle"
- "Cyclone"
- "Dead Rat"
- "The Devil Came to Bethlehem"
- "Dog and Pony"
- "Dulce et Decorum est Pro Patria Mori"
- "Dust to Dust"
- "The Floor Heard Everything"
- "Happy Hooker"
- "In the Studio"
- "Ink Stains"
- "Left Hand Song (A Lesson in How Fleeting Preservation Is)"
- "Little Girls"
- "Long Brown Hair"
- "Lucky Penny"
- "Making Records"
- "Men" (other titles: "Eternal Life is a Drag", "Walk on Water")
- "Mermaid"
- "The Mustard Musketeers"
- "One-String Blues"
- "Party Upstairs" (with Jack Dishel)
- "Quarters"
- "Reginasaurus"
- "Secret Stash (No One)"
- "Soho"
- "A Space-Time Fairytale"
- "Train Ballad"
- "Trigger Happy"
- "Uncle Bobby"
- "The Virgin Queen"
- "Woolen Gloves"
- "You"

== Unreleased songs covered live (7) ==
- "Chelsea Hotel #2" (Leonard Cohen cover)
- "Halikha LeKesariya"
- "Hallelujah" (Leonard Cohen cover)
- "Love Profusion" (Madonna cover)
- "Mr. Tambourine Man"
- "It's All Over Now, Baby Blue" (Bob Dylan cover, with "Cabin Down Below Band", May 25, 2012, Dylanfest 2012, Irving Plaza, New York, NY)
- "Moon River" (with Lang Lang (pianist) and orchestra performing at the Lincoln Center, Rose Theater on May 3, 2016 for ”New York Rhapsody”)
