= Live in London (Regina Spektor album) =

Live album by Regina Spektor
- Released: November 22, 2010
- Recorded: December 4, 2009
- Venue: Hammersmith Apollo, London
- Genre: Anti-folk; indie rock
- Length: 75:49
- Label: Sire
- Producer: David Kahne; Regina Spektor

Regina Spektor chronology
| Far (2009) | Live in London (2010) | What We Saw from the Cheap Seats (2012) |

Professional ratings
Review scores
| Source | Rating |
|---|---|
| AllMusic | 4/5 stars |

Live in London is the first live album by American alternative singer-songwriter Regina Spektor, recorded at the Hammersmith Apollo, in London, during her Far Tour, and released worldwide through Sire Records on November 22, 2010.

The video was directed by Adria Petty, and is offered in DVD+CD, Blu-ray+CD, vinyl and digital format. It features 3 previously unreleased songs.

== Track listing ==
All tracks are written by Regina Spektor, except where noted.

CD track listing
| No. | Title | Featured on | Length |
|---|---|---|---|
| 1. | "On the Radio" | Begin to Hope | 3:07 |
| 2. | "Eet" | Far | 4:01 |
| 3. | "Folding Chair" | Far | 3:25 |
| 4. | "Sailor Song" | Soviet Kitsch | 3:14 |
| 5. | "Blue Lips" | Far | 3:27 |
| 6. | "Après Moi" | Begin to Hope | 4:36 |
| 7. | "Dance Anthem of the 80's" | Far | 5:07 |
| 8. | "Silly Eye Color Generalizations" | Previously unrecorded | 2:42 |
| 9. | "Bobbing for Apples" | Previously unrecorded | 2:22 |
| 10. | "Wallet" | Far | 3:51 |
| 11. | "Ode to Divorce" | Soviet Kitsch | 3:36 |
| 12. | "That Time" | Begin to Hope | 2:38 |
| 13. | "The Calculation" | Far | 2:53 |
| 14. | "Machine" | Far | 3:48 |
| 15. | "Laughing With" | Far | 3:33 |
| 16. | "Man of a Thousand Faces" | Far | 3:00 |
| 17. | "Hotel Song" | Begin to Hope | 3:18 |
| 18. | "Us" | Soviet Kitsch | 4:03 |
| 19. | "Fidelity" | Begin to Hope | 3:40 |
| 20. | "Samson" | Songs / Begin to Hope | 3:06 |
| 21. | "The Call" | The Chronicles of Narnia: Prince Caspian | 3:09 |
| 22. | "Love You're a Whore" | Previously unrecorded | 3:15 |

DVD, Blu-Ray, digital video track listing
| No. | Title | Length |
|---|---|---|
| 1. | "Introduction: November Rain" (Axl Rose) | 2:22 |
| 2. | "On the Radio" | 3:09 |
| 3. | "Eet" | 3:53 |
| 4. | "Laughing With" | 3:35 |
| 5. | "Folding Chair" | 3:27 |
| 6. | "Après Moi" | 4:45 |
| 7. | "Blue Lips" | 3:26 |
| 8. | "Machine" | 4:02 |
| 9. | "Dance Anthem of the 80's" | 4:34 |
| 10. | "Silly Eye Color Generalizations" | 3:19 |
| 11. | "Wallet" | 2:21 |
| 12. | "The Calculation" | 2:51 |
| 13. | "Man of a Thousand Faces" | 3:17 |
| 14. | "That Time" | 2:57 |
| 15. | "Hotel Song" | 3:17 |
| 16. | "Sailor Song" | 3:06 |
| 17. | "Us" | 4:33 |
| 18. | "Fidelity" | 4:01 |
| 19. | "Samson" | 4:36 |
| 20. | "Credits" | 3:36 |

Bonus DVD and Blu-Ray content
| No. | Title | Length |
|---|---|---|
| 1. | "Bobbing for Apples" | 2:32 |
| 2. | "Ode to Divorce" | 3:47 |
| 3. | "The Call" | 3:10 |
| 4. | "Love, You're a Whore" | 3:33 |
| 5. | "Soundcheck" | 1:28 |
| 6. | "To Daniel Cho" | 1:30 |

== Personnel ==
- Regina Spektor - vocals, piano, keyboards, guitar
- Dave Heilman - drums
- Kaoru Ishibashi - violin
- Elizabeth Myers - viola
- Yoed Nir - cello
- Daniel Cho - cello, band leader

Technical

- Rebecca Chandler - assistant engineer
- Devin Sarna, Ron Shapiro, Sarah Roebuck, Tom Whalley - executive producer
- Holly Tienken - design
- Adria Petty - film direction

== Charts ==
| Chart (2025) | Peak position |
|---|---|
| Hungarian Physical Albums (MAHASZ) | 40 |
