= Adria Petty =

American film director

- Born: November 28, 1974 (age 51)
- Occupations: Director, editor, art director, artist
- Known for: Music video work with Beyoncé and Regina Spektor

Adria Petty (born November 28, 1974) is an American director, editor, art director, and artist. She is best known for her music video work with Beyoncé and Regina Spektor. She is the elder daughter of the late rock musician Tom Petty and his first wife, Jane Benyo.

== Career ==
Petty attended Tisch School of the Arts's graduate program prior to her film career. After college, Petty gathered work experience by working as an assistant to directors such as Penny Marshall, Oscar-winner Jonathan Demme, and Oscar-nominated documentary executive Jonathan Stack.

She collaborated with artist Anna Gabriel and musician Howie Statland on a site-specific installation at New York's modern art gallery PS1, a division of the Museum of Modern Art in 1998; the group called themselves "Low Flame". The installation detailed the life of a lonely garbage man that built friends out of garbage.

Petty has worked with various recording artists to develop visual campaigns in print, video and new media. Petty has directed videos for artists such as Regina Spektor, Beyoncé, Coldplay & Rihanna, Kings of Leon, Macy Gray, Corinne Bailey Rae, Duffy, The Duke Spirit, The Veronicas, and Mat Kearney. Petty has also been asked to work outside of the music video format. In 2005, she created tour visuals for rock band The Who. Petty was employed on a freelance basis as a marketing consultant at Sire Records, working with many artists and working on a rebrand of the label. While working at Sire, she most notably created signature marketing campaigns and videos for Regina Spektor.

Her first documentary was a film about Paris Hilton, Paris, Not France, which premiered at the Toronto International Film Festival in 2008. Her second documentary film, "Regina Spektor: Live in London", debuted in 2010 in the United States with a limited theatrical release.

In 2011, Petty released the short film NU-6 which was inspired by a hearing exam she had to take after suffering from two ruptured ear drums. The film was shot in a day.

Petty was nominated for five MTV Video Music Awards for videos for Beyoncé's "Countdown", Coldplay and Rihanna's "Princess of China" and Regina Spektor's "All the Rowboats" in 2012.

In addition to her work in the music video industry, Petty has also worked on commercials, creating advertising for brands such as Target, McDonald's, Clorox, Volkswagen, Hershey, Lancôme, Converse, and Mary Kay, as well as for non-profits CASA and AWE.

Petty has also traveled as a film critic, writer and photographer for Nylon magazine.

== Personal life ==
Petty has a daughter, Everly (born 21 August 2013), with Charley Drayton. She named her daughter after The Everly Brothers.

== Filmography ==
=== Music videos ===
- Coldplay and Rihanna – "Princess of China" – June 2, 2012
- Regina Spektor – "All the Rowboats" – March 28, 2012
- Beyoncé – "Countdown" – October 4, 2011
- Tom Petty & The Heartbreakers – "Don't Pull Me Over" – December 15, 2010
- Corinne Bailey Rae – "Closer" – July 1, 2010
- Tom Petty & The Heartbreakers – "I Should Have Known It" – June 15, 2010
- Macy Gray – "Beauty in the World" – April 8, 2010
- Only Son – "Magic" – November 7, 2010
- Regina Spektor – "Eet" – November 27, 2009
- Regina Spektor – "Laughing With" – October 8, 2009
- Fools Gold – "Nadine" – September 29, 2009
- Thenewno2 – "Yomp" – July 21, 2009
- Regina Spektor – "Man of 1000 Faces" – June 23, 2009
- Regina Spektor – "Dance Anthem" – June 9, 2009
- Beyoncé – "Sweet Dreams" – June 2, 2009
- The Duke Spirit – "My Sunken Treasure" – June 9, 2008
- Hillary McRae – "When You Will Be Mine" – March 21, 2008
- Duffy – "Mercy" – February 11, 2008
- Anjulie – "Boom" – 2008
- Mat Kearney – "Undeniable" – August 29, 2007
- Kings of Leon – "On Call" – March 26, 2007
- Regina Spektor – "Us" – 2006
- The Crimea – "Baby Boom" – October 24, 2006
- Regina Spektor – Fidelity – September 25, 2006
- Brazilian Girls – "Rules of the Game" – May 2, 2006
- Regina Spektor – "Better" – Jun 13, 2006
- Stellastarr* – "Sweet Troubled Soul" – September 2005
- The Crimea – "Opposite Ends" – September 13, 2005
- The Veronicas – "4ever" – August 15, 2005
- Jonathan Rice – "Acrobat" – April 26, 2005
- The Ditty Bops – "Wishful thinking" – October 26, 2004
- Glampire - "Somewhere In Space" - 2001
- Stacey Earle – "Simple Girl" – 1999

=== TV commercials ===
- House of Deréon – "Valentine's Day"
- House of Deréon – "Christmas"
- Breathe Right – "Stephanie"
- CASA – "Signs"
- Converse – "Secret"
- Hershey – "Bliss"
- Lancôme – "Rouge in Love"
- Mary Kay – "Compact"
- Mary Kay – "Rest and Restore"
- McDonald's – "Breathing Room"
- Target – "Portals"
- Target – "Cart"
- Target – "McQueen"
- Volkswagen – "Alison Shaw"
- Volkswagen – "lnk1"
- Volkswagen – " Fisherman"
- Volkswagen – "Cat van Milders"

=== Films ===
- Paris, Not France (2008)
- Regina Spektor: Live in London (2010)
- NU-6 (2011)

== Other projects ==
=== Art director ===
- Regina Spektor – "Begin to Hope" – June 13, 2006
- Regina Spektor – "Live at Bull Moose" – August 23, 2005
- The Crimea – "Tragedy Rocks" – March 8, 2004
- Tom Petty & The Heartbreakers – "The Last DJ" – October 8, 2002
