= Bull Moose =

Bull Moose may refer to:

- Bull moose, a mature male moose
- Bull Moose Party (1912–1920), a progressive political party active in the United States
- Bull Moose Project, a nonprofit political organization.
- Bull Moose Music, an independent retailer and record store chain based in Portland, Maine
- Bull Moose Jackson (1919–1989), an American blues and rhythm-and-blues singer
- Bull Moose Township, Cass County, Minnesota, a township

== See also ==
- Bullmoose (disambiguation)
- Live at Bull Moose (disambiguation)
