= Mary Ann Meets the Gravediggers and Other Short Stories =

- Album art by Julie Morstad

Compilation album by Regina Spektor
- Released: 16 January 2006
- Genres: Rock; anti-folk
- Length: 52:22
- Label: Transgressive
- Producers: Richie Castellano; Joe Mendelson; Gordon Raphael; Alan Bezozi; Regina Spektor

Regina Spektor chronology
Soviet Kitsch (2003)	Mary Ann Meets the Gravediggers and Other Short Stories (2006)	Begin to Hope (2006)

Professional ratings
Review scores
Source	Rating
Drowned in Sound	9/10
The Guardian	4/5 stars

Mary Ann Meets the Gravediggers and Other Short Stories is a compilation album by Regina Spektor, released in 2006 for the UK market, where it reached number 185 on the UK Albums Chart. It features songs from her three previous albums, 11:11 (2001), Songs (2002), and Soviet Kitsch (2003). The CD comes packaged with a bonus DVD (Region 2) featuring the short promo film "Survival Guide to Soviet Kitsch" and the music video for the song "Us". (These are the same materials found on the DVD that accompanied some US and Australian editions of Soviet Kitsch.)

The title comes from two tracks on the compilation that mention a character named Mary Ann ("Sailor Song" and "Mary Ann") and two tracks that mention gravediggers ("Consequence of Sounds" and "Pavlov’s Daughter").

The cover art was drawn by Julie Morstad and is done in the style of Edward Gorey.

== Track listing ==
No.	Title	Original album	Length
1.	"Oedipus"	Songs
2.	"Love Affair"	11:11
3.	"Poor Little Rich Boy"	Soviet Kitsch
4.	"Sailor Song"	Soviet Kitsch
5.	"Mary Ann"	11:11
6.	"Prisoners"	Songs
7.	"Consequence of Sounds"	Songs
8.	"Daniel Cowman"	Songs
9.	"Lacrimosa"	Songs
10.	"Pavlov’s Daughter"	11:11
11.	"Chemo Limo"	Soviet Kitsch
12.	"Us"	Soviet Kitsch
Total length:			52:22
