= Live at Bull Moose =

Live at Bull Moose may refer to:

- Live at Bull Moose (Regina Spektor EP), 2005
- Live at Bull Moose (The Decemberists EP), 2011
