= Bullmoose (disambiguation) =

Bullmoose was a Canadian rock band.

Bullmoose may also refer to:

- a style of bicycle handlebar
- General Bullmoose, a character from a satirical American comic strip Li'l Abner

== See also ==
- Bull Moose (disambiguation)
- Bull Moose Party, in the United States
