= Don't Leave Me (Ne Me Quitte Pas) =

Single by Regina Spektor

from the album What We Saw from the Cheap Seats
- Released: March 26, 2012
- Genre: Anti-folk; indie rock; indie pop
- Length: 3:39
- Label: Sire
- Songwriter: Regina Spektor
- Producer: Mike Elizondo

Regina Spektor singles chronology
"All the Rowboats" (2012)	"Don't Leave Me (Ne Me Quitte Pas)" (2012)	"How" (2012)

Music video
- "Don't Leave Me (Ne Me Quitte Pas)" on YouTube

"Don't Leave Me (Ne Me Quitte Pas)" is a song by Regina Spektor, from her 2012 album What We Saw from the Cheap Seats. It was released as the album's second single on March 26, 2012. Although a handful of critics assumed this was an English-language cover version of Jacques Brel's song "Ne me quitte pas", Spektor's song is different in every way except the title. The chord structure, melody, and lyrics are all completely different. Brel's song was written in the key of A minor, in 3/4 time. It is a slow, haunting story of a man trying to win back his former lover—a song about the cowardice of men according to Brel. In contrast, Spektor's song is lively, in 4/4 time, and in a major key. Its lyrics evoke a carefree jaunt through various neighborhoods of New York City, the narrator describing all the beautiful and interesting things encountered along the way. Somehow the narrator ends up in the cafés and gardens of Paris, and the song ends with repeated declarations of love for Paris in the rain.

The song was previously released on Spektor's 2002 album Songs, simply titled "Ne Me Quitte Pas". This version of the song featured just Spektor and her piano, while the 2012 version includes a drum machine, horns and brass instruments. The song also features lyrics sung in both English and French. In June 2012, Spektor released yet another version of the song online, keeping the multi-instrument production heard on What We Saw from the Cheap Seats, but replacing the English verses with Russian lyrics. The new rendition was titled "Не Покидай Меня".

The song can be heard at the end of the episode "Five Miles From Yetzer Hara" from the eighth season of Weeds.

== Music video ==
A video for the 2012 version of "Don't Leave Me (Ne Me Quitte Pas)" was uploaded to YouTube on June 12, 2012. The video was directed by Ace Norton and features Spektor, alone in an apartment, barefoot, interacting with various items. For example, at one point she is fencing on a table and at another she is dancing on a piano. The video is edited by Isaac Hagy and production design is by Maxwell Orgell.

== Musicians ==
- Regina Spektor - Vocals, Piano, all Keyboards and Marimba
- Aaron Sterling - Drums and Marimba
- Mike Elizondo - Bass and Programming
- Danny T. Levin - Trumpet
- David Moyer - Baritone and Tenor Sax
- Jack Dishel - Vocals
