= Nickel Eye =

American musical group

Nickel Eye is the solo project of The Strokes' bassist Nikolai Fraiture. The band consists of: Nikolai Fraiture (guitar, vocals, electric bass, double bass, harmonica), Joel Cadbury (steel guitar), Jamie McDonald (guitar) and Brett Shaw (drums).

When The Strokes’ hiatus began lasting longer than expected, Nikolai reached into an old shoebox of poems and rants written years ago. With his free time, he began adapting them to music. Enlisting the help of South, a UK band introduced to him by a friend, Nickel Eye recorded some demos at South Studios in Hackney, London. With some guest appearances by Nick Zinner of the Yeah Yeah Yeahs and Regina Spektor, The Time of the Assassins was completed a few months later in New York City.

Due to the recent regrouping of the Strokes to focus on a new album, Nickel Eye has been placed on the back burner. However, Fraiture expresses deep desire to continue where he left off when he can.

== The Time of the Assassins ==
Nickel Eye's debut album, The Time of the Assassins, released on January 27, 2009, via Rykodisc, is a "pretty stripped down" collection of guitar, bass, drums, and a touch of mellotron. The album is written and produced by himself. It is musically inspired by some of his favourite artists, such as Neil Young, Frank Black, Leonard Cohen and The Kinks. The artwork is reminiscent of Lynd Ward's Gods’ Man, a collection of woodcuts considered to be one of the first graphic novels. The lyrics and theme for The Time of the Assassins found their impetus during a road trip across the United States of America when Nikolai was nineteen.
