= On the Radio (Regina Spektor song) =

Single by Regina Spektor

from the album Begin to Hope
- Released: May 30, 2006
- Genre: Anti-folk, indie pop
- Length: 3:23
- Label: Sire (US)/WEA (UK)
- Songwriter: Regina Spektor
- Producer: David Kahne

Regina Spektor singles chronology
| "Us" (2006) | "On the Radio" (2006) | "Fidelity" (2006) |

Music video
- "On the Radio" on YouTube

"On the Radio" is the first single from Regina Spektor's fourth album, Begin to Hope. The chorus contains references to the song "November Rain" by Guns N' Roses. As of 2009 the single had sold 116,000 copies in United States.

== Music video ==
An accompanying music video was released which shows Spektor teaching a music class made up of young school children. The video uses stop motion in a few scenes. An alternative video was released in which Spektor sings in a chocolate factory. The video was directed by Matt Lenski.

== In popular culture ==
The television show Grey's Anatomy used the song "On The Radio" in the episode "Damage Case."

"On The Radio" was featured in the 2011 film Beastly. It was also used in the soundtrack of the French movie Bouquet final (2008) directed by Michel Delgado. It can also be heard in the soundtrack of the French movie The Day I Saw Your Heart (2011 - American title), directed by Romain Lévy, Cécile Sellam and Jennifer Devoldère.

Amanda Palmer has performed this song often live from her and Spektor's similar, piano-driven styles.

The Netflix series Sex Education used a cover by Chip Taylor in the final episode of the second season.

Philadelphia rapper e-dubble received permission from Spektor to sample the song for his Freestyle Friday episode entitled "On the Radio."

== Release history ==
| Year | Label | Format | Country | B-sides |
|---|---|---|---|---|
| 2006 | WEA | CD/Digital download (Pt. 1) | UK | "Ain't No Cover" (live)* |
| 2006 | WEA | CD/Digital download (Pt. 2) | UK | "Düsseldorf" |
| 2006 | WEA | Digital download | UK | "20 Years of Snow (Live at Shepherd's Bush)" |
| 2006 | Sire | Digital download | US | none |
| 2006 | Sire | 7" vinyl | UK | "20 Years of Snow (Live at Shepherd's Bush)" |
| 2006 | Sire | 7" vinyl | EU | "Ain't No Cover" (live)* |

* Taken from the Live at Bull Moose EP

== Charts ==
| Chart (2006) | Peak position |
|---|---|
| UK Singles Chart | 60 |
