= The Time of the Assassins =

Studio album by Nickel Eye
- Released: January 27, 2009
- Label: Rykodisc
- Producer: Nikolai Fraiture

Singles from The Time of the Assassins
- 1. "Brandy of the Damned" Released: October 2008; 2. "Dying Star" Released: April 18th, 2009

Professional ratings
Aggregate scores
Source	Rating
Metacritic	56/100
Review scores
Source	Rating
AllMusic	3/5 stars
Blender	3/5 stars
Pitchfork	(5.2/10)

The Time of the Assassins is the debut album by The Strokes' bassist Nikolai Fraiture, released under the pseudonym Nickel Eye. It was released on Rykodisc on January 27, 2009.

Two singles were released from the album: "Brandy of the Damned", backed with album track "Back from Exile", and "Dying Star", which was released for Record Store Day 2009 and featured a remix of "Brandy of the Damned" by English musician/producer Mark Ronson. Music videos were also released for "Brandy of the Damned" and "You and Everyone Else", and an unofficial video was made for "Dying Star".

On October 14, 2008, a blog post appeared on the Nickel Eye MySpace page under the title "The Time of the Assassins". It read:

"At the age of 19, a naive young man began a voyage down South looking to cultivate his garden in the wilderness of the American promise. Long before the flood in New Orleans, he met a street musician called "Woof" on Jackson Square, the leader of a three-piece jazz band playing standards for tourists outside a church. The story goes that one day, as Woof sang Louis Armstrong's lyric "I see friends shaking hands", he approached the young traveler in the crowd. Woof shook his hand and with a possessed stare put a spell on him. While still in New Orleans, a Native-American medicine woman caught sight of the young man's hands and stopped him. After observing them for a moment, she ominously warned: "To find yourself, you must first completely lose yourself". A few nights later, while in his bed at the New Orleans Youth Hostel, there began what would be endless months of hallucinations and haunting visions: Rocky Mountain Fever. In a burning vision, when the struggle became too great to withstand, he saw the Phoenix rise. He had found himself at the Crossroads and music was his only remedy. Our weary traveler shed his youthful skin and thus began the rebirth of Nickel Eye."

== Track listing ==
All tracks are written by Nikolai Fraiture except where noted.

No.	Title	Length
1.	"Intro (Everytime)"	2:47
2.	"You and Everyone Else"	3:39
3.	"Back from Exile"	3:32
4.	"Fountain Avenue"	2:57
5.	"This Is the End"	2:38
6.	"Dying Star"	3:12
7.	"Brandy of the Damned"	2:59
8.	"Providence, RI"	2:58
9.	"Where the Cold Wind Blows"	3:51
10.	"Another Sunny Afternoon"	3:51
11.	"Hey, That's No Way to Say Goodbye" (Leonard Cohen)	3:17

iTunes bonus tracks
No.	Title	Length
12.	"These Days" (Jackson Browne)	3:53
13.	"Brandy of the Damned (Mark Ronson Remix) (ft. Wale)"	4:07
14.	"Brandy of the Damned (Music video)"	2:58

== Personnel ==
- Nikolai Fraiture – vocals, guitar, electric bass, double bass on "Where the Cold Wind Blows", harmonica on "Fountain Avenue" and "Another Sunny Afternoon"
- Joel Cadbury – steel guitar on "Providence, RI"
- Jamie McDonald – additional guitar and solo on "Brandy of the Damned"
- Brett Shaw – drums (all tracks except "Dying Star", "Another Sunny Afternoon", and "Hey, That's No Way to Say Goodbye")
- Regina Spektor – piano on "Where the Cold Wind Blows"
- Nick Zinner – guitar on "Dying Star"
- Jack Dishel – backing vocals on "Intro (Everytime)" and "Dying Star"
- Jesse Wallace – drums on "Dying Star" and "Another Sunny Afternoon"
