= What We Saw from the Cheap Seats =

Studio album by Regina Spektor
- Released: May 29, 2012
- Recorded: Summer 2011
- Studios: Phantom (Westlake Village, California); Can-Am Recorders (Tarzana, Los Angeles)
- Genres: Anti-folk; baroque pop; indie pop
- Length: 37:18
- Label: Sire
- Producers: Mike Elizondo; Regina Spektor

Regina Spektor chronology
Live in London (2010)	What We Saw from the Cheap Seats (2012)	Remember Us to Life (2016)

Singles from What We Saw from the Cheap Seats
- 1. "All the Rowboats" Released: February 27, 2012; 2. "Don't Leave Me (Ne Me Quitte Pas)" Released: March 26, 2012; 3. "How" Released: October 16, 2012

What We Saw from the Cheap Seats is the sixth studio album by the American singer-songwriter Regina Spektor. On November 21, 2011, Spektor posted on her Facebook page that the album had been recorded with Mike Elizondo in Los Angeles during the summer of 2011. It was released on May 29, 2012. The album is a collection of new material alongside the first studio recordings of several songs Spektor had previously only performed live.

By the time of the album's release, "Jessica" was the only song that was entirely new to fans: an earlier recording of "Don't Leave Me (Ne Me Quitte Pas)" had been included on Spektor's 2002 album Songs, and the rest of the songs had already been performed live, with "How" and "The Party" making their debut just weeks earlier.

== Singles and promotion ==
The album's first single, "All the Rowboats", was released for streaming on February 27, 2012, and for digital download the following day. It was featured prominently on the episode of the CW's Ringer that aired on March 13, 2012, making Spektor the "Artist Spotlight" of the week. The second single, "Don't Leave Me (Ne Me Quitte Pas)", is a new version of "Ne Me Quitte Pas", a song originally from Spektor's 2002 album Songs. On October 16, 2012, "How" was released as the third single from the album. Music videos were produced for these songs.

Spektor undertook two tours in support of the album. The first was a tour of the southern US, on which Spektor opened for Tom Petty and the Heartbreakers for eight shows in April and May 2012. The second was an international tour that opened with three sold-out shows in New York City, Boston, and Philadelphia, at which Only Son, a band led by Spektor's husband Jack Dishel, was the opening act. This tour extended to several European countries (including Russia, to which Spektor had not traveled since emigrating from it as a child) and ran through the summer of 2012.

To promote the album, Spektor performed on the Late Show with David Letterman, Good Morning America, The Colbert Report, and VH1; did an interview with The New York Times; and did a special "Live on YouTube" engagement.

== Critical reception ==
Professional ratings
Aggregate scores
Source	Rating
Metacritic	73/100
Review scores
Source	Rating
AllMusic	4/5 stars
The A.V. Club	(A−)
Consequence of Sound	3.5/5 stars
Entertainment Weekly	(B)
NME	(8/10)
Ology	(A−)
Pitchfork	(6.3/10)
Paste Magazine	(6/10)
Rolling Stone	3.5/5 stars
Slant Magazine	4/5 stars
Sputnikmusic	5/5 stars

Similarly to Spektor's previous studio albums, What We Saw from the Cheap Seats received a favorable reaction upon its release. On review-aggregation website Metacritic, it has a score of 73 out of 100, based on 28 reviews, which indicates "generally favorable reviews".

Several critics praised the unique quirkiness of the album, with Will Hermes of Rolling Stone, who gave it 3.5 out of 5 stars, claiming that the album "may be [Spektor's] best," and made Spektor "her generation's Joni Mitchell. A staff reviewer for Sputnikmusic gave the album the maximum 5 out of 5 stars, writing that it is Spektor's "best effort yet," and that "an artist who could already seemingly do no wrong went and became even more perfect." American Songwriter wrote that "Cheap Seats as a whole [...] points toward ever unfolding new directions for an artist whose sense of whimsy never excludes the possibility of real-world despair."

== Commercial performance ==
In the United States, the album debuted at number three on the Billboard 200, with sales of 42,000 (this was the same rank, but a slight decrease in sales from the opening of Spektor's previous studio album, Far). As of September 2016, the album had sold 174,000 copies in the United States.

== Track listing ==
All songs written by Spektor except where noted.

No.	Title	Writer(s)	Length
1.	"Small Town Moon"		3:02
2.	"Oh Marcello"	Spektor w/ interpolation by Bennie Benjamin, Sol Marcus, and Gloria Caldwell ("Don't Let Me Be Misunderstood")	2:38
3.	"Don’t Leave Me (Ne Me Quitte Pas)"		3:39
4.	"Firewood"		4:55
5.	"Patron Saint"		3:40
6.	"How"		4:48
7.	"All the Rowboats"		3:34
8.	"Ballad of a Politician"		2:13
9.	"Open"		4:30
10.	"The Party"		2:28
11.	"Jessica"		1:44
Total length:			37:18

Deluxe edition bonus tracks

No.	Title	Writer(s)	Length
12.	"Call Them Brothers" (featuring Only Son)	Jack Dishel, Regina Spektor	3:07
13.	"The Prayer of François Villon (Molitva)"	Bulat Okudzhava	3:33
14.	"Old Jacket (Stariy Pidjak)"	Bulat Okudzhava	2:04
Total length:			46:03

== Personnel ==
All credits for tracks one through eleven are listed in the album's booklet.

- Regina Spektor - vocals, piano (1–10), keyboards (2–10), marimba (3), co-producer, songwriter
- Mike Elizondo - producer, bass (1, 3, 5, 7–10), upright bass (2, 4, 6), electric guitar (1, 6, 7), acoustic guitars (11), programming (3, 5, 7)
- Aaron Sterling - drums (1, 3–7, 9), percussion (1, 5, 7), marimba (3)
- Jay Bellerose - drums (2, 7, 10), percussion (2, 10), bongos (10)
- Danny T. Levin - trumpet (3)
- David Moyer - baritone and tenor saxophone (3)
- Jack Dishel - vocals (3, 5)
- John Daversa - trumpet (10)

Additional personnel

- Art direction, design – Stephen Walker (6)
- Co-producer – Regina Spektor
- Engineer – Adam Hawkins
- Engineer [Assistant] – Brent Arrowood
- Management – Ron Shapiro
- Management [Business] – Errol Wander
- Mastered by – Bob Ludwig
- Photography by – Shervin Lainez
- Producer – Mike Elizondo
- Written-By – Regina Spektor

== Charts ==
=== Weekly charts ===
Chart (2012)	Peak position
Austrian Albums (Ö3 Austria)	26
Australian Albums (ARIA)	9
Belgian Albums (Ultratop Flanders)	34
Belgian Albums (Ultratop Wallonia)	83
Canadian Albums (Billboard)	12
Dutch Albums (Album Top 100)	53
French Albums (SNEP)	88
German Albums (Offizielle Top 100)	46
Ireland Albums	26
Mexican Albums	89
Norwegian Albums (VG-lista)	31
Scottish Albums (Official Charts)	21
Swedish Albums (Sverigetopplistan)	23
Swiss Albums (Schweizer Hitparade)	24
UK Albums (Official Charts)	24
UK Album Downloads (Official Charts)	30
US Billboard 200	3
US Top Alternative Albums (Billboard)	1
US Top Rock Albums (Billboard)	2
US Indie Store Album Sales (Billboard)	5

=== Year-end charts ===
Chart (2012)	Position
US Top Rock Albums (Billboard)	57

=== Singles ===
Single	Chart	Position
All the Rowboats	Australia	91
All the Rowboats	U.S. Rock Digital Songs	38
