= You've Got Time =

Single by Regina Spektor

from the album Music from Orange Is the New Black
- Released: July 9, 2013
- Genre: Post-punk revival
- Length: 3:08 (full version); 1:11 (credits); 2:52 (chamber version)
- Label: Sire
- Songwriter: Regina Spektor
- Producer: Rob Cavallo

Regina Spektor singles chronology
"How" (2012)	"You've Got Time" (2013)	"Bleeding Heart" (2016)

Music video
- "You've Got Time" on YouTube

"You've Got Time" is the main title theme song for the Netflix Original Series Orange Is the New Black, written, composed and performed by Regina Spektor. The song was nominated in the Best Song Written for Visual Media category at the 56th Annual Grammy Awards.

A chamber orchestra version was later released on July 26, 2019, to coincide with the release of the seventh and final season of Orange Is the New Black.

== Composition ==
The song was written specifically for Orange Is the New Black by Regina Spektor, who was approached by the show's creator, Jenji Kohan. Kohan said, "I listened to Regina's albums obsessively while writing the series, so I immediately thought of her for our theme song." Additionally Spektor had previously performed a cover of "Little Boxes," the theme song used on Kohan's series Weeds.

Kohan gave Spektor access to rough edits of the episodes while the first season was in production. Spektor said she composed the song while "thinking about the idea of what it must be like to be in prison and the different states of mind." After recording the song with producer Rob Cavallo, she brought the demo to Kohan, initially apprehensive that Kohan would not like it. "We took out the rough mix and listened to it with headphones and sort of held our breath, like, 'Is she going to like it?' And then she said, 'This is fucking awesome, I love it! It’s going to fit really well!'"

== Reception ==
The song has been well received. Casey Cipriani of Indiewire wrote that the song's lyrics suggesting animals trapped in a cage was ideal for Orange Is the New Black. Garin Pirnia of Rolling Stone noted that after the song begins with Spektor's "aggressive" guitar playing, "'You've Got Time' softens during the bridge, though, generating an aura of hope. When Spektor sings the title refrain, it works literally for the prison motif but also alludes to the show's themes of redemption and forgiveness."

"You've Got Time" was nominated in the Best Song Written for Visual Media category at the 56th Annual Grammy Awards. It was Spektor's first Grammy nomination.

The song was covered by The Wind and The Wave for its 2015 album, Covers One.
