= Remember Us to Life =

Studio album by Regina Spektor
- Released: September 30, 2016
- Recorded: 2015–2016
- Studios: The Village Recorder (Los Angeles, CA); Can-Am Recorders (Tarzana, CA); 4th Street Recording (Santa Monica, CA); Smecky Music Studios (Prague, Czech Republic)
- Genres: Anti-folk; baroque pop; indie pop
- Length: 46:29
- Labels: Warner Bros.; Sire
- Producers: Leo Abrahams; Regina Spektor

Regina Spektor chronology
What We Saw from the Cheap Seats (2012)	Remember Us to Life (2016)	Home, Before and After (2022)

Singles from Remember Us to Life
- 1. "Bleeding Heart" Released: July 22, 2016; 2. "Small Bill$" Released: August 11, 2016; 3. "Black and White" Released: September 8, 2016; 4. "Older and Taller" Released: September 22, 2016

Professional ratings
Aggregate scores
Source	Rating
Metacritic	70/100
Review scores
Source	Rating
AllMusic	3.5/5 stars
Consequence of Sound	B
Pitchfork	6.6/10
Rolling Stone	3.5/5 stars
Vice (Expert Witness)	A−

Remember Us to Life is the seventh studio album by singer-songwriter Regina Spektor. Spektor announced that it would be released on September 30, 2016, on July 22, 2016. The lead single of the album is "Bleeding Heart", which is available to listen in full via SoundCloud via Spektor herself.

The title is a translation of Hebrew: זכרנו לחיים, a phrase from the High Holy Days liturgy. Spektor encountered the phrase in her prayer book on Yom Kippur while pregnant.

== Overview ==
On July 12, 2016, Spektor announced on her Facebook page and official website that news would be released in the coming days. On July 22, 2016, Spektor announced that her seventh studio album would be entitled Remember Us to Life. This announcement came with the cover art of the album as well as the lead single and opening track of the album, "Bleeding Heart". Additionally it was announced that the album would be available in both a standard edition, featuring 11 songs, and a deluxe edition, featuring all 11 songs of the standard as well as three bonus tracks. The Warner Music store features the album for pre-order in both physical copies and MP3 copies, along with a clear vinyl edition.

== Track listing ==
All tracks written by Regina Spektor.

No.	Title	Length
1.	"Bleeding Heart"	3:58
2.	"Older and Taller"	3:56
3.	"Grand Hotel"	3:04
4.	"Small Bill$"	3:33
5.	"Black and White"	3:49
6.	"The Light"	4:56
7.	"The Trapper and the Furrier"	4:24
8.	"Tornadoland"	3:48
9.	"Obsolete"	6:37
10.	"Sellers of Flowers"	4:00
11.	"The Visit"	4:24
Total length:		46:29

Deluxe edition
No.	Title	Length
12.	"New Year"	5:28
13.	"The One Who Stayed and the One Who Left"	4:58
14.	"End of Thought"	3:19
Total length:		60:14

== Personnel ==
- Leo Abrahams - bass, guitar, percussion, programming, string arrangements, synthesizer, producer
- Jay Bellerose - percussion
- Caroline Buckman - viola
- Giovanna Moraga Clayton - cello
- Jack Dishel - vocals (background)
- Mike Elizondo - bass, double bass
- Judith Hamann - cello
- Songa Lee - violin
- Stella Mozgawa - drums
- Julie Rogers - violin
- Davide Rossi - orchestration, viola, violin
- Nancy Roth - viola
- Andrew Skeet - conductor, string arrangements
- Regina Spektor - celeste, composer, conductor, piano, string arrangements, synthesizer, vocals, co-producer
- Joey Waronker - drums, percussion

== Charts ==
Chart (2016)	Peak position
Australian Albums (ARIA)	20
Austrian Albums (Ö3 Austria)	57
Belgian Albums (Ultratop Flanders)	68
Belgian Albums (Ultratop Wallonia)	122
Canadian Albums (Billboard)	64
Scottish Albums (Official Charts)	33
Swiss Albums (Schweizer Hitparade)	54
UK Albums (Official Charts)	47
US Billboard 200	23
