= Far (album) =

Studio album by Regina Spektor
- Released: June 23, 2009
- Studios: Phantom Studios (Westlake Village, CA); Bungalow Palace Studio (Los Angeles); Clinton Studio (New York City); SeeSquared Studios (New York City); Gramercy Post (New York City); State of the Arc (Richmond)
- Genres: Anti-folk; indie rock
- Length: 47:39
- Label: Sire
- Producers: Mike Elizondo; Jacknife Lee; Jeff Lynne; David Kahne; Regina Spektor

Regina Spektor chronology
Begin to Hope (2006)	Far (2009)	Live in London (2010)

Singles from Far
- 1. "Laughing With" Released: May 18, 2009; 2. "Eet" Released: October 2009

Far is the fifth studio album by American alternative singer-songwriter Regina Spektor. It was released in Europe on June 22, 2009, and in North America on June 23, 2009, through Sire Records.

== Background ==
Spektor decided to work with multiple producers on the album. She has compared composing an album to taking a class, and said she wanted to have "multiple professors". She also felt that having multiple producers would help each to not worry what the single or big hit would be. The tracks produced by David Kahne, who produced Spektor's previous studio album, Begin to Hope (2006), and by Mike Elizondo, who produced her next studio album, What We Saw from the Cheap Seats (2012), credit Spektor as "co-producer", whereas those produced by Jacknife Lee and Jeff Lynne do not.

Although Lynne, as founder of Electric Light Orchestra and co-founder of The Traveling Wilburys, has an expansive musical background, Spektor did not know of his work when she originally met him. "Regina's songs are like literature," said Lynne, who doesn't usually work with new artists, but said that Spektor's demo tapes blew him away. "It hits you right in the face how brilliant it is," he said.

== Release ==
The album's first single, "Laughing With", was uploaded to Spektor's MySpace page on May 8, 2009, and was released as a digital download on May 18 in the United States and parts of Europe, along with the b-side "Blue Lips". Two viral videos for "Dance Anthem of the 80's" [sic] and "Eet" were also released on Spektor's MySpace account. The official music video for "Laughing With" was released on iTunes on May 26, 2009.

A deluxe edition of the album was released with two bonus tracks and a DVD that included four music videos.

The track "Human of the Year" was included in a pivotal scene of the pilot episode of the HBO series Enlightened.

== Reception ==
Professional ratings
Aggregate scores
Source	Rating
Metacritic	74/100
Review scores
Source	Rating
AllMusic	3.5/5 stars
The A.V. Club	(B+)
Entertainment Weekly	(B+)
The Guardian	3/5 stars
NME	(6/10)
Paste	(49/100)
Pitchfork Media	(4.8/10)
Rolling Stone	4/5 stars
Spin	4/5 stars
Robert Christgau	(A−)

Far scored 74 on Metacritic, which signifies "generally favorable reviews".

David Bevan of Spin said that, in "The Calculation", Spektor "purrs a scenario of love and hurt that plays out in the breakfast nook".

Ann Powers of the LA Times said of "Eet": "It's not just cute."

Melissa Maerz of Entertainment Weekly praised the album's quirkiness. She said that, in "Folding Chair", Spektor "literally sings like a dolphin", and that "Wallet" is the "best song ever inspired by a Blockbuster card".

Jon Dolan of Rolling Stone said "Laughing With" is a song that "ends collapsing in an existential freakout over a soft beat and weeping cello".

Emily MacKay of NME said "Human of the Year" has "a typically Spektorian conceit", and that Spektor's "remarkable, gutsy voice vaults to the rafters of heartbreak".

James Skinner of Drowned in Sound called "Genius Next Door" a "spiralling Gothic narrative that comes on with all the otherworldly beauty of a Haruki Murakami story". He went on to say the album does not aim "at ideas above its station", nor does it "flounder in search of unity".

Max Neibaur of Frequency said that, in "Man of a Thousand Faces", the "pathos of the lyrics is still strong enough to make the Incredible Hulk tear up a bit". Of the whole album, he said that Far "pleases every auditory appetite".

Jeremy Blacklow of Access Hollywood called the album a "wonderful soothing summer sound".

Lewis of the Cord Weekly said: "Spektor delivers gloomy tales of turmoil, complemented by slow, haunting piano notes that could just as easily accompany a horror film."

Snyder of the New Haven Advocate said that, overall, Spektor has "redirected some of that freaky stuff, tweaked and perfected it, to a new place where it fits better", and that the songs are "sometimes kind of serious".

According to Neibaur, "The stark contradictions of critics relating to Spektor exemplify a larger problem in modern music criticism—very few writers truly analyze music from an artistic perspective any longer." In a similar vein, during a June 24, 2009, interview, Spektor remarked that: "I mean, in this book, it's music criticism from the 19th century, and they're ripping Tchaikovsky a new asshole, but the thing that really gets me is that it's written so beautifully. It's nasty reviews in beautiful language, and that's what I want. My dad will forward me some of the stuff people write about me, and I think it's all bullshit. It's all, 'Oh, this sucks, that sucks, blah.' I don't want that. I want you to write poetically about how bad I suck."

== Music videos ==
Adria Petty, daughter of musician Tom Petty, directed four music videos for the album. The videos can be viewed on Spektor's MySpace page and are also available on the bonus DVD included with the deluxe edition of Far. The songs for which videos were made are:

- "Laughing With"
- "Eet"
- "Dance Anthem of the 80's"
- "Man of a Thousand Faces"

== Chart performance ==
Far spent one week on the UK Albums Chart at number 30. It spent also one week, at number 16, on the Canadian Albums Chart. In the US, the album sold 50,000 copies in its first week and entered the US Billboard 200 at number three; it would go on to spend nineteen weeks on the chart.

== Track listing ==
All tracks are written by Regina Spektor.

No.	Title	Producer(s)	Length
1.	"The Calculation"	Mike Elizondo	3:11
2.	"Eet"	Mike Elizondo	3:52
3.	"Blue Lips"	Jeff Lynne	3:34
4.	"Folding Chair"	Jeff Lynne	3:35
5.	"Machine"	Mike Elizondo	3:55
6.	"Laughing With"	Jacknife Lee	3:17
7.	"Human of the Year"	David Kahne	4:07
8.	"Two Birds"	Jacknife Lee	3:18
9.	"Dance Anthem of the 80's"	Jacknife Lee	3:43
10.	"Genius Next Door"	Jeff Lynne	5:06
11.	"Wallet"	Jeff Lynne	2:28
12.	"One More Time with Feeling"	David Kahne	3:59
13.	"Man of a Thousand Faces"	Mike Elizondo	3:11

Deluxe edition
No.	Title	Producer(s)	Length
14.	"Time Is All Around"	Mike Elizondo	3:06
15.	"The Sword & the Pen"	Jeff Lynne	3:48

iTunes bonus track version
No.	Title	Producer(s)	Length
16.	"Riot Gear"	David Kahne	2:06
17.	"The Flowers (Live, Begin to Hope Tour)" (Pre-order only)		4:04

== Personnel ==
- Regina Spektor – co-producer, lead vocals
- Jeri Heiden – design, photography
- Sam Bell – editing, engineer
- Adam Hawkins – engineer
- Beck Henderer-Peña – engineer
- David Kahne – engineer, mixing, producer, programming
- Marc Mann – engineer
- Steve Jay – engineer
- Tom McFall – engineer
- Brent Arrowood – assistant engineer
- David Kahne – engineer, programming
- Tom Whalley – executive producer
- Brendon T. Sharkey – illustration
- Ron Shapiro – management
- Bob Ludwig – mastering
- Adam Hawkins – mixing
- Jacknife Lee – mixing, producer
- Marc Mann – mixing
- Michael H. Brauer – mixing
- Steve Jay – mixing
- Ryan Gilligan – pro-tools engineer, assistant mixer
- Will Hensley – pro-tools engineer, assistant mixer
- Jeff Lynne – producer
- Mike Elizondo – producer
- Adria Petty – art direction, photography
- Jeri Heiden – art direction

== Charts ==
=== Weekly charts ===
Chart (2009)	Peak position
Australian Albums (ARIA)	10
Austrian Albums (Ö3 Austria)	41
Belgian Albums (Ultratop Flanders)	37
Canadian Albums (Billboard)	16
French Albums (SNEP)	99
German Albums (Offizielle Top 100)	83
Irish Albums (IRMA)	24
New Zealand Albums (RMNZ)	38
Scottish Albums (Official Charts)	44
Swedish Albums (Sverigetopplistan)	8
Swiss Albums (Schweizer Hitparade)	53
UK Albums (Official Charts)	30
US Billboard 200	3
US Top Alternative Albums (Billboard)	24
US Top Rock Albums (Billboard)	36

=== Year-end charts ===
Chart (2009)	Position
US Billboard 200	196

== Certifications ==
Region	Certification	Certified units/sales
Australia (ARIA)	Gold	35,000^{^}
United Kingdom (BPI)	Silver	60,000^{‡}
United States (RIAA)	Gold	500,000^{‡}
^{^} Shipments figures based on certification alone.^{‡} Sales+streaming figures based on certification alone.
