= Home, Before and After =

Studio album by Regina Spektor
- Released: June 24, 2022
- Studios: Dreamland (Hurley, New York); Big Orange Sheep (New York City, New York); FAME Studios (Muscle Shoals, Alabama); United Recording Studios (Los Angeles, California); Elmwood West (Los Angeles, California)
- Length: 47:20
- Labels: Sire; Warner
- Producer: John Congleton

Regina Spektor chronology
| Remember Us to Life (2016) | Home, Before and After (2022) |

Singles from Home, before and after
- 1. "Becoming All Alone" Released: February 22, 2022; 2. "Up the Mountain" Released: April 29, 2022; 3. "Loveology" Released: June 7, 2022

Home, Before and After is the eighth studio album by singer-songwriter Regina Spektor, released on June 24, 2022, through Sire and Warner Records. It was announced on February 22, 2022, along with the release of its lead single "Becoming All Alone" on streaming platforms.

== Critical reception ==
Professional ratings
Aggregate scores
| Source | Rating |
|---|---|
| AnyDecentMusic? | 7.7/10 |
| Metacritic | 76/100 |
Review scores
| Source | Rating |
| AllMusic | 4/5 stars |
| The Arts Desk | 4/5 stars |
| Beats Per Minute | 78% |
| Evening Standard | 4/5 stars |
| Gigwise | 8/10 stars |
| The Irish Times | 4/5 stars |
| The Line of Best Fit | 7/10 |
| NME | 4/5 stars |
| Paste | 8.0/10 |
| Pitchfork | 6.6/10 |
| Slant Magazine | 3.5/5 stars |
| Sputnikmusic | 4.0/5 |
| The Telegraph | 5/5 stars |

Home, Before and After received positive reviews from contemporary music critics. At Metacritic, which assigns a normalized rating out of 100 to reviews from mainstream critics, the album has an average score of 77 based on 11 reviews, indicating "generally favorable reviews". Aggregator AnyDecentMusic? gave it 7.7 out of 10, based on their assessment of the critical consensus.

Veteran critic Robert Christgau gave Home, Before and After an A-minus and said that, even though "she's not getting any happier [at 42]", "crafted song follows crafted song and thoughtful lyric enriches thoughtful lyrics", while "her sweet, modest, precise voice" surpasses "her classically trained piano" playing. Christgau also highlighted the cautionary narrative of "One Man's Prayer" and the reassuring one of the album closer "Through a Door".

== Track listing ==
All tracks written by Regina Spektor.

Home, Before and After track listing
| No. | Title | Length |
|---|---|---|
| 1. | "Becoming All Alone" | 4:18 |
| 2. | "Up the Mountain" | 4:40 |
| 3. | "One Man's Prayer" | 4:05 |
| 4. | "Raindrops" | 3:09 |
| 5. | "SugarMan" | 4:35 |
| 6. | "What Might Have Been" | 2:44 |
| 7. | "Spacetime Fairytale" | 8:47 |
| 8. | "Coin" | 5:23 |
| 9. | "Loveology" | 5:16 |
| 10. | "Through a Door" | 4:19 |
| Total length: | | 47:20 |

== Personnel ==
Musicians

- Regina Spektor – vocals, piano, keyboards (3, 5, 6, 8)
- John Congleton – synthesizer (all tracks), bass (1–3, 5, 7, 8), drum programming (1–3, 5, 9), percussion (1–3, 6), horns arrangement (2, 5), string arrangement (2, 3, 5), drums (3), electric guitar (3, 5, 7, 8); marimba, vibraphone (5); keyboards (6–8, 10), theremin (6)
- Luke Reynolds – bass (1, 8, 9); horns arrangement, string arrangement (1); electric guitar (3, 5, 6, 8), acoustic guitar (5), synthesizer (6)
- Skopje Studio Orchestra – orchestra (1–5, 7–9)
- Joey Waronker – percussion (1–3), drums (3, 5–9)
- Jherek Bischoff – horns arrangement (2, 4, 5), string arrangement (2, 4, 5, 7–9)
- Caleb Teicher – tap dancing (7)

Technical

- John Congleton – production,engineering, mixing
- Regina Spektor – co-production
- Ariel Shafir – engineering
- David Turk – engineering (7)
- John Davis – mastering

== Charts ==
Chart performance for Home, Before and After
| Chart (2022) | Peak position |
|---|---|
| Australian Digital Albums (ARIA) | 16 |
| Scottish Albums (Official Charts) | 59 |
| Swiss Albums (Schweizer Hitparade) | 48 |
| UK Album Downloads (Official Charts) | 30 |
| US Top Album Sales (Billboard) | 26 |
