= Begin to Hope =

Studio album by Regina Spektor
- Released: June 13, 2006
- Recorded: Summer 2005
- Studios: SeeSquaredStudio and New York Noise Studios, NYC
- Genres: Anti-folk; indie pop; chamber pop
- Length: 47:15
- Label: Sire 9362-44112-2
- Producers: David Kahne; Regina Spektor

Regina Spektor chronology
Mary Ann Meets the Gravediggers and Other Short Stories (2006)	Begin to Hope (2006)	Far (2009)

Singles from Begin to Hope
- 1. "On the Radio" Released: May 30, 2006; 2. "Fidelity" Released: September 25, 2006; 3. "Better" Released: July 2007; 4. "Summer in the City" Released: December 2007

Professional ratings
Aggregate scores
Source	Rating
Metacritic	80/100
Review scores
Source	Rating
AllMusic	4/5 stars
The A.V. Club	A−
Entertainment Weekly	B+
The Guardian	4/5 stars
Mojo	4/5 stars
NME	8/10
Pitchfork	7.5/10
Rolling Stone	3.5/5 stars
Spin	4/5 stars
Uncut	4/5 stars

Begin to Hope is the fourth album by Russian-born American singer-songwriter Regina Spektor. It was released June 13, 2006. The album debuted at number 70 on the Billboard 200, but due to the popularity of the single "Fidelity", it peaked at number 20 and was labeled a "pace setter" by Billboard. Rolling Stone named it the 21st-best album of 2006. The album was certified Platinum by the RIAA for shipments to U.S. retailers of 1,000,000 units.

The album was nominated for the 2006 Shortlist Music Prize.

Peter Gabriel recorded a cover of "Après Moi" on his orchestral album Scratch My Back, released in 2010.

== Track listing ==
All songs written by Regina Spektor.

Standard Edition
No.	Title	Length
1.	"Fidelity"	3:47
2.	"Better"	3:22
3.	"Samson"	3:10
4.	"On the Radio"	3:22
5.	"Field Below"	5:18
6.	"Hotel Song"	3:29
7.	"Après Moi"	5:08
8.	"20 Years of Snow"	3:31
9.	"That Time"	2:39
10.	"Edit"	4:53
11.	"Lady"	4:45
12.	"Summer in the City"	3:50
Total length:		47:15

Deluxe Edition bonus disc
No.	Title	Length
1.	"Another Town"	4:07
2.	"Uh-Merica"	3:16
3.	"Baobabs"	2:02
4.	"Düsseldorf"	3:09
5.	"Music Box"	2:11

iTunes Store/Amazon MP3 bonus tracks
No.	Title	Length
1.	"Hero"	3:44
2.	"Bartender"	3:12

Vinyl edition disc 2, side A
No.	Title	Length
1.	"Another Town"	4:10
2.	"Uh-Merica"	3:19
3.	"Baobabs"	2:04
4.	"Düsseldorf"	3:12
5.	"Music Box"	2:07

Vinyl edition disc 2, side B
No.	Title	Length
1.	"Better (Piano and Voice)"	3:09
2.	"Better (Radio Recut)"	3:12
3.	"Hero"	3:45
4.	"Bartender"	3:12

Vinyl 10th Anniversary edition disc 2, side B Bonus Track
No.	Title	Length
1.	"Baby Jesus"	2:43

== Personnel ==
- Regina Spektor – piano, vocals, guitar, percussion
- Nick Valensi – guitar on "Better"
- David Kahne – bass on "Better"
- Zhao Gang – erhu on "Field Below"
- Ralph U. Williams – saxophone on "Lady"
- Shawn Pelton – drums on "Fidelity", "Better", "On the Radio", "Hotel Song", "Après Moi" & "That Time"
- Rachel Beth Egenhoefer – album design
- David Kahne – mainstream pop producer

== Charts ==
=== Weekly charts ===
Chart (2006–07)	Peak position
Australian Albums (ARIA)	29
Austrian Albums (Ö3 Austria)	72
Belgian Albums (Ultratop Flanders)	40
Irish Albums (IRMA)	18
New Zealand Albums (RMNZ)	10
Scottish Albums (Official Charts)	63
Swedish Albums (Sverigetopplistan)	18
UK Albums (Official Charts)	53
US Billboard 200	20

Chart (2025)	Peak position
Hungarian Physical Albums (MAHASZ)	28

=== Year-end charts ===
Chart (2007)	Position
Belgian Albums (Ultratop Flanders)	100
Swedish Albums (Sverigetopplistan)	58
US Billboard 200	154

== Certifications ==
Region	Certification	Certified units/sales
Australia (ARIA)	Gold	35,000^{^}
New Zealand (RMNZ)	Gold	7,500^{^}
United Kingdom (BPI)	Gold	100,000^{^}
United States (RIAA)	Platinum	1,000,000^{‡} / 600,000
Summaries
Worldwide	—	1,000,000
^{^} Shipments figures based on certification alone.

== Single success ==
In 2006, Regina Spektor's first single, "Fidelity", premiered on VH1. Soon after, VH1 included her among "You Oughta Know: Artists on the Rise".

Spektor performed "Fidelity" on Late Night with Conan O'Brien in July 2006 and on ABC's Good Morning America in April 2007. She also performed "On The Radio" on Jimmy Kimmel Live! in November 2006. She performed the song again on Late Show with David Letterman in April 2007, and on the Australian Rove McManus show in 2007.

"Better" was released to US radio in late July 2007.

Even though it was not released as a single, "Hotel Song" has reached No. 11 in the Irish music download charts and No. 16 in the Irish Top 50 Singles Chart as of May 2007.

"Samson" is a re-recording of a song that was originally released on her second album Songs in 2002. Gwen Stefani used the song for her Season 9 battle between Korin Bukowski and Chase Kerby on The Voice.

"Après Moi" was covered by Peter Gabriel on his 2010 album Scratch My Back.

== In popular culture ==
- The song "Better" appeared in the fourth season of the CBS TV show How I Met Your Mother in an episode titled "Happily Ever After" (2008). It was featured in the 2009 film My Sister's Keeper. A piano version of the song appeared prominently throughout the series finale of The Good Wife in 2016.
- "Hotel Song" was featured in a TV commercial of mobile phone company Vodafone in Ireland, contributing to the song's popularity in the country. The song was also featured in the 2011 Jennifer Westfeldt film Friends with Kids.
- "Music Box" was featured on a JCPenney commercial.
- "Samson" was featured on CSI: NY in the second-season episode "All Access" (2006).
- "Field Below" was on an episode of Criminal Minds.
- "That Time" was featured in the 2008 Martin McDonagh film In Bruges starring Colin Farrell and Brendan Gleeson.
- "Hero" was featured in the film (500) Days of Summer, along with "Us" from Spektor's previous album, Soviet Kitsch.
- "Fidelity" is one of the songs featured in "Elephant Love Medley", a number in Moulin Rouge! The Musical.

== Sales ==
- In New Zealand, the album was certified Gold for sales of more than 7,500.
- In Australia, the album was certified Gold for sales of more than 35,000.
- In the United States, the album was certified Gold for shipments of over 500,000 copies. Its sales have since surpassed 600,000 according to Nielsen/Soundscan.
