= Samson (Regina Spektor song) =

2006 song by Regina Spektor

Song by Regina Spektor

from the album Songs/Begin to Hope
- Recorded: December 25, 2001
- Genre: Anti-folk; Indie pop
- Length: 3:09 (Begin to Hope version); 3:32 (music video version); 3:54 (Songs version)
- Label: Self-released (Songs version); Sire (Begin to Hope version)
- Songwriter: Regina Spektor
- Producers: Joe Mendelson (Songs version); David Kahne (Begin to Hope version)

Music video
- "Samson" on YouTube

"Samson" is a song written and recorded by American singer-songwriter Regina Spektor, from her albums Songs (2002) and Begin to Hope (2006). Despite having never been officially released as a single, it has charted in several countries, and is often considered one of Spektor's greatest songs. As of 2009 it has sold 143,000 copies in United States and was certified gold by the RIAA on May 15, 2025.

== Background and composition ==
"Samson" was initially recorded as the first track for Spektor's second album Songs, which she recorded in one take on Christmas Day 2001. In 2006, Spektor re-recorded the song for her album Begin to Hope, which, unlike Songs, had a major label backing.

Lyrically, "Samson" references the biblical episode of Samson and Delilah, found in Judges 16. Samson was granted extraordinary physical strength by God, though his strength was held in his hair, without which he was powerless. He fell in love with Delilah, who, because of his lust for women, discovered his vulnerability, and used it against him.

The song is composed in the key of B major. The earlier recording from Songs has a tempo of 76 beats per minute, whereas the Begin to Hope version was recorded at a significantly faster tempo of 90 beats per minute. The song alters between bars of 6/4 and bars of 4/4. Spektor's voice ranges from the low note of B3 to the high notes of D♯5.

== Music video ==
"Samson" had an accompanying music video, despite not having been released as a single. The video was shot in almost black and white, and revolved around Spektor performing the song on a piano whilst paper designs pan over the camera. Various stop-motion animation styles are seen, primarily involving paper cutouts.

== Charts ==
Despite not being released as a single, the Begin to Hope version of "Samson" charted in four countries, being Spektor's most charted single to date (along with "Fidelity").

Chart (2007)	Peak position
Australia (ARIA)	52
Belgium (Flanders) (Ultratop)	30
Sweden (Sverigetopplistan)	29
UK Singles Chart	174

== Certifications ==
Region	Certification	Certified units/sales
United States (RIAA)	Gold	500,000^{‡}
^{‡} Sales+streaming figures based on certification alone.

== Covers ==
"Samson" has been performed by the following contestants on reality singing competitions:

- Alice Hagenbrant on season 7 of Idol (Sweden), 2010
- Casey Withoos on season 1 of The Voice (Australia), 2012
- Stephanie Müller on season 4 of The Voice of Germany, 2014
- Korin Bukowski and Chase Kerby on season 9 of The Voice (U.S.), 2015
- Brianna Holm on season 5 of The Voice (Australia), 2016
- Karlee Metzger on season 11 of The Voice (U.S.), 2016
- Joshua Ray Walker on his album What Is It Even?, 2023

lucas Geldof on season 9 of The Voice of Belgium (Belgium), 2024
