= Laughing With =

Single by Regina Spektor

from the album Far
- B-side: "Blue Lips"
- Released: May 18, 2009
- Genre: Antifolk
- Length: 3:14
- Label: Sire Records
- Songwriter: Regina Spektor
- Producer: Jacknife Lee

Regina Spektor singles chronology
"Better" (2007)	"Laughing With" (2009)	"Eet" (2009)

Music video
- "Laughing With" on YouTube

"Laughing With" is a song from Regina Spektor's fifth studio album, Far. It was released as the album's lead single on Regina's MySpace on May 8, 2009, and was officially released as a digital download on May 18 in various parts of Europe and in the United States and Canada on May 19.

Spektor arranged strings for this song, "but instead of a traditional quartet we had two cellos. I'm drawn to that, the lower sounds - bass, cello, tuba, that warm bottomy sound."

A physical EP was released in the U.S. on June 9, 2009. Apart from "Laughing With", it contains the songs Folding Chair, from Spektor's upcoming album; "The Call", which was featured in the soundtrack of the film The Chronicles of Narnia: Prince Caspian; and a live performance of "The Noise" from the Live at Bull Moose EP.

It was used in an episode of The Leftovers, season 2, episode 5: "No Room at the Inn".

== Track listing ==
Digital download
No.	Title	Length
1.	"Laughing With"	3:14
2.	"Blue Lips"	3:32

EP
No.	Title	Length
1.	"Laughing With"	3:14
2.	"Folding Chair"	3:35
3.	"The Call" (From the soundtrack to The Chronicles of Narnia: Prince Caspian)	3:07
4.	"The Noise" (Live from Bull Moose)	3:20

== Music video ==
A music video directed by Adria Petty was released on May 26, 2009.

== Charts ==
The song has reached #14 on the Billboard Hot Singles Sales. In Belgium the song has thus far peaked at #34 on the Singles Chart.

Chart	Peak position
Belgium Singles Chart	34
U.S. Billboard Hot Singles Sales	14
