= 11:11 (Regina Spektor album) =

Studio album by Regina Spektor
- Released: July 9, 2001
- Recorded: December 2000
- Genre: Jazz
- Length: 46:21
- Labels: Self-released (2001, original); Sire (2022, remastered plus Papa's Bootlegs)
- Producers: Richie Castellano; Regina Spektor

Regina Spektor chronology
11:11 (2001)	Songs (2002)

11:11 is the debut album by singer-songwriter Regina Spektor. Initially, it was self-released on CD and sold at Spektor's early shows. Stylistically, the album differs from Spektor's later work as she was heavily influenced by jazz and blues at the time of its recording.

In 2021, for the 20th anniversary of the album, Spektor announced a box set featuring a remastered version of 11:11 on clear vinyl and a 2-LP live album titled Papa's Bootlegs, a compilation of Spektor's father's recordings of her early live performances. After releasing "Love Affair" to streaming services on 11:11's 21st anniversary, Spektor released the remastered version of the album to streaming services and began shipping the box set on August 26, 2022; the new digital release also included the Papa's Bootlegs live album as bonus tracks.

== Reception ==
Professional ratings
Review scores
Source	Rating
Pitchfork	7.7/10 (2022)

An Emeritus reviewer for Sputnikmusic awarded the album four stars.

Reflecting on 11:11 for its 20th anniversary, Stereogum's James Rettig dubbed it "an early example of... Spektor's immense talent and promise." Alongside 2002's Songs, Rettig credited it with solidifying her place in New York City's anti-folk scene.

== Track listing ==
All tracks composed by Regina Spektor.

No.	Title	Length
1.	"Love Affair"	2:22
2.	"Rejazz"	3:37
3.	"Back of a Truck"	5:52
4.	"Buildings"	4:43
5.	"Mary Ann"	2:56
6.	"Flyin'"	1:59
7.	"Wasteside"	2:22
8.	"Pavlov's Daughter"	7:43
9.	"2.99¢ Blues"	3:33
10.	"Braille"	4:55
11.	"I Want to Sing"	3:56
12.	"Sunshine"	2:23
Total length:		46:21

== Personnel ==
- Regina Spektor – piano, vocals, percussion, guitar
- Chris Kuffner - bass, percussion
- Richie Castellano – bass, percussion, engineer, mixing
- David Panarelli – art design, photography

== See also ==
- 11:11 (numerology)
