= All the Rowboats =

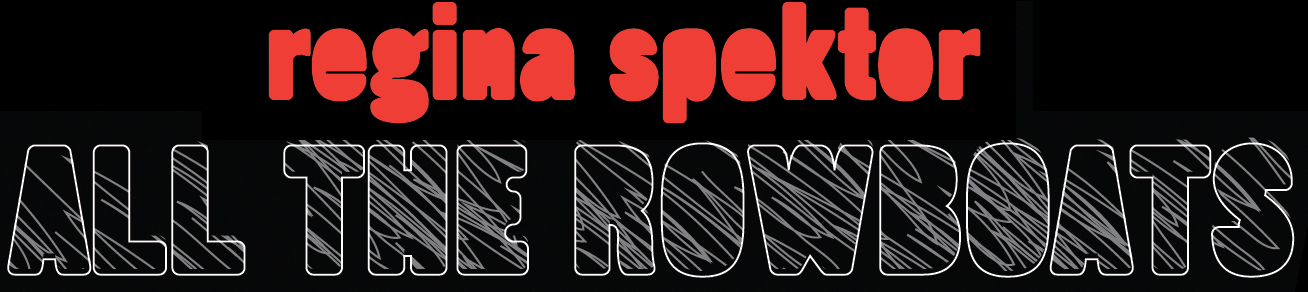

Single by Regina Spektor

from the album What We Saw from the Cheap Seats
- Released: 27 February 2012 (Streaming); 28 February 2012 (Digital download)
- Recorded: 2011
- Length: 3:34
- Label: Sire Records
- Songwriter: Regina Spektor
- Producers: Regina Spektor, Mike Elizondo

Regina Spektor singles chronology
| "No Surprises" (2010) | "All the Rowboats" (2012) | "Don't Leave Me (Ne me quitte pas)" (2012) |

Music video
- "All the Rowboats" on YouTube

"All the Rowboats" is the first single from Regina Spektor's sixth album What We Saw from the Cheap Seats. It was first released for streaming on February 27, 2012, and on the following day it was released for digital download. The song had been occasionally performed by Spektor in concerts since 2005. During concerts, Spektor would emulate a drum machine sound with her microphone.

== Music video ==
A music video was released on YouTube on March 28, 2012. The video begins with Spektor being tied up on a rowboat which is cut off by a clip of a lighthouse. Later she appears on a dock. The video also contains clips of Spektor underwater, running down corridors as well as being crushed by closing walls. It utilizes stop-motion animation to animate the motion of the waves. It was directed by Adria Petty, daughter of musician Tom Petty, and Peter Sluszka.

The music video's Production Designer, Anthony Henderson, was nominated for the Best Art Direction in a Video award at the 2012 MTV Video Music Awards.

== Personnel ==
- Writers: Regina Spektor
- Producer: Regina Spektor, Mike Elizondo
- Vocals, Piano, Keyboards: Regina Spektor
- Percussion: Aaron Sterling
- Drums: Jay Bellerose, Aaron Sterling
- Bass, Electric guitar, Programming: Mike Elizondo

== Use in media ==
The song was featured on a prime spot on The CW show Ringer on March 13, 2012. This made her the Artist Spotlight of the week.

== Charts ==
Chart performance for "All the Rowboats"
| Chart (2012) | Peak position |
|---|---|
| Australia (ARIA) | 91 |
| US Rock Digital Singles (Billboard) | 37 |
