= Songs (Regina Spektor album) =

Studio album by Regina Spektor
- Released: 2002
- Recorded: December 25, 2001
- Studios: Antenna, New York City
- Genre: Anti-folk
- Length: 49:26
- Label: Self-released
- Producers: Joe Mendelson; Regina Spektor

Regina Spektor chronology
11:11 (2001)	Songs (2002)	Soviet Kitsch (2003)

Songs is the second album by singer-songwriter Regina Spektor. The album was recorded in its entirety on Christmas Day of 2001; each song was recorded in one take. Copies of the self-released album were sold at Spektor's early live shows. This used to be the only album of hers not available on streaming services, though many of the tracks can be heard on the 2006 compilation album Mary Ann Meets the Gravediggers and Other Short Stories. It was officially released to streaming services on November 29, 2024.

== Track listing ==
All tracks are written by Regina Spektor.

No.	Title	Length
1.	"Samson"	3:54
2.	"Oedipus"	4:50
3.	"Prisoners"	3:03
4.	"Reading Time with Pickle"	5:33
5.	"Consequence of Sounds"	5:09
6.	"Daniel Cowman"	4:51
7.	"Bon Idée"	4:10
8.	"Aching to Pupate"	2:13
9.	"Lounge"	3:34
10.	"Lacrimosa"	5:14
11.	"Lulliby"	2:27
12.	"Ne Me Quitte Pas"	4:38
Total length:		49:26

- A different version of the song "Samson" can also be found as the third track of her album Begin to Hope.
- A new version of the song "Ne Me Quitte Pas" (re-titled as "Don't Leave Me (Ne Me Quitte Pas)") can be found on her album What We Saw From The Cheap Seats.

== Personnel ==
- Regina Spektor – vocals, piano
- Chelsea Horenstein – photography
- Ryan B Curtis – layout design
