= Us (Regina Spektor song) =

Single by Regina Spektor

from the album Soviet Kitsch
- Released: 2004 (America); 2006 (UK)
- Genre: Anti-folk, baroque pop
- Length: 4:54
- Label: Sire, Transgressive
- Songwriter: Regina Spektor

Regina Spektor singles chronology
"Carbon Monoxide" (2005)	"Us" (2004)	"On the Radio" (2006)

Music video
- "Us" on YouTube

"Us" is the fifth track from American singer Regina Spektor's major label debut Soviet Kitsch. It was officially released as a single in 2006 for her UK compilation album Mary Ann Meets the Gravediggers and Other Short Stories. The song is notable for its use of a string quartet in addition to Spektor's usual piano and vocals. As of 2009, the single had sold 86,000 copies in the United States.

== Music video ==
This is the first Regina Spektor song to have an accompanying music video. The video used stop motion animation. It shows Spektor climbing into a dark green room and unpacking an assortment of objects from a trunk, including a piano, rug, a globe, and some seeds, which she places on the rug and grows with water. The video contains some strange scenes, such as toy soldiers coming out of Spektor's mouth, and ends with her placing everything (including herself) back into the trunk, which vanishes. The music video is a parody of Georges Méliès's silent film, The Diabolic Tenant (1909), in which a man rents an apartment and furnishes it by unpacking objects from his trunk in the same fashion Spektor does in Us. The video was directed by Adria Petty.

== Use in media ==
Notably, the primary piano and strings riff of the song was used in an ad supporting Democratic presidential candidate Joe Biden ahead of the 2020 United States presidential election. The song was also used in a UEFA Champions League Final montage, by ITV. This song was also used during the opening credits montage of the film (500) Days of Summer.

== Certifications ==
Region	Certification	Certified units/sales
United States (RIAA)	Gold	500,000^{‡}
^{‡} Sales+streaming figures based on certification alone.

== Releases ==
Year	Label	Format	Catalog no.	Country	B-sides
2005	Transgressive Records	7" vinyl	018	UK	"Scarecrow & Fungus"/"December"
2006	Transgressive Records	CD single	018	UK	"Scarecrow & Fungus"
2006	WEA	Digital download	?	UK	"Scarecrow & Fungus"/"December"
