= Fidelity (song) =

Single by Regina Spektor

from the album Begin to Hope
- Released: 2006
- Genre: Indie pop; baroque pop
- Length: 3:46
- Label: Sire
- Songwriter: Regina Spektor
- Producers: Regina Spektor, David Kahne

Regina Spektor singles chronology
"On the Radio" (2006)	"Fidelity" (2006)	"Better" (2007)

Music video
- "Fidelity" on YouTube

"Fidelity" is a song by American singer-songwriter Regina Spektor, released as the second single from her fourth album Begin to Hope. The song marked Spektor's first and only Billboard 100 entry and is her most successful track to date. Despite a release date of September 25 (its popular music video was released even earlier), the song did not hit the charts until December. The song was released in the UK as a two-part single on March 12, 2007. The song makes it Spektor's highest-charting single around the world.

Spektor wrote the song while watching the movie High Fidelity, which is based on a book by Nick Hornby.

The single was certified platinum by the RIAA for sales of 1,000,000 copies and single released from her album Begin to Hope which was her most successful single in the United States. As of 2009, the single has sold 716,000 copies in the US.

== Music video ==
It is directed by Marc Webb. The video features Spektor in a black and white dress in an abstract environment enjoying tea alone. The room and decor are also black and white. As the video progresses, an empty suit is shown, which Spektor converses with as though it were a real companion. Near the end of the video, Spektor drops a heart pendant on the ground, revealing colored dust. A man (played by Scoot McNairy) appears in the suit, and the two then play with the dust, and join hands as the video ends.

== Track listing ==
UK CD 1
No.	Title	Length
1.	"Fidelity"
2.	"Music Box"

UK CD 2
No.	Title	Length
1.	"Fidelity"
2.	"Music Box"
3.	"December"
4.	"Fidelity" (Enhanced Video)"

UK digital download/AUS CD
No.	Title	Length
1.	"Fidelity"
2.	"Music Box"
3.	"December"

== Chart performance ==
"Fidelity" initially made an appearance on the Billboard Bubbling Under chart at number 8 (the equivalent to a number 108) on December 6. Two weeks later, Spektor made her first appearance in her career on the Billboard Hot 100 as "Fidelity" entered at number 98. It climbed for the following two weeks before disappearing and then reappearing at number 58 on the Billboard Hot 100 and number 36 on the Billboard Hot Digital Songs in early 2007.

Fidelity debuted on the New Zealand RIANZ charts at number 16, because digital downloads had been added in the week of its debut. This song would have achieved a higher placing if digital downloads had been included earlier, as shown by the single's concurrent top ranking at the New Zealand iTunes Store.

In 2009, the popularity of Spektor's single "Laughing With" caused a revival in sales of "Fidelity", bringing it to number 55 on the Alternative Songs Chart on US iTunes.

== Charts ==
Chart (2006)	Peak position
Australia (ARIA)	50
New Zealand (Recorded Music NZ)	16
UK Singles (Official Charts)	45
US Billboard Hot 100	51
US Adult Pop Airplay (Billboard)	33
US Billboard Pop 100	46

== Certifications ==
Region	Certification	Certified units/sales
United States (RIAA)	Platinum	1,000,000^{‡}
^{‡} Sales+streaming figures based on certification alone.

== In popular culture ==
In 2009, the song was used with permission as accompaniment to the video "Don't divorce us", released by the Courage Campaign against Proposition 8. The video was viewed over 500,000 times in a week.

In the 2010 film Love & Other Drugs, the song can be heard as the film's credits are rolled.

The song was also used in Veronica Mars, Brothers & Sisters, A Favorita, Grey's Anatomy, Secret Diary of a Call Girl, 27 Dresses, and Las Vegas.

Parts of the song were incorporated into the "Elephant Love Medley" from the Broadway production of Moulin Rouge!
