= Eet =

Single by Regina Spektor

from the album Far
- B-side: "The Sword & the Pen" (acoustic version)
- Released: November 27, 2009 (digital download)
- Genre: Anti-folk
- Length: 3:53
- Label: Sire
- Songwriter: Regina Spektor
- Producer: Mike Elizondo

Regina Spektor singles chronology
"Laughing With" (2009)	"Eet" (2009)	"No Surprises" (2010)

Music video
- "Eet" on YouTube

"Eet" is a song from Regina Spektor's fifth studio album, Far. It was released as the album's second official single in October 2009. In Europe it was released as a digital download on November 27, 2009.

== Music video ==
A viral music video directed by Adria Petty was released, prior to the album's release, on May 29, 2009. Filming of the music video took place in east Lancaster, California down the street from Club Ed, a film studio located in the Antelope Valley that has been used for various TV shows, motion pictures, and TV commercials for several decades.

== Promotion ==
Spektor performed this song along with "The Calculation" on Saturday Night Live on October 10, 2009.

== Track listing ==
Digital download
No.	Title	Length
1.	"Eet"	3:51
2.	"The Sword & the Pen (acoustic version)"	3:37

== Charts ==
Chart performance for "Eet"
Chart (2010)	Peak position
Australia (ARIA)	79
