= Soviet Kitsch =

Studio album by Regina Spektor
- Released: May 2, 2003
- Studios: TMF (New York City); The Garden (London)
- Genre: Art pop
- Length: 38:49
- Labels: Shoplifter; Sire
- Producers: Gordon Raphael; Alan Bezozi; Regina Spektor

Regina Spektor chronology
Songs (2002)	Soviet Kitsch (2003)	Mary Ann Meets the Gravediggers and Other Short Stories (2006)

Singles from Soviet Kitsch
- 1. "Carbon Monoxide" Released: 2003; 2. "Your Honor" / "The Flowers" Released: 2004; 3. "Us" Released: 2006

Soviet Kitsch is the major label debut and third album by American singer/songwriter Regina Spektor. It was originally released on Shoplifter Records on May 2, 2003, but was reissued on August 17, 2004, when Spektor signed with Sire Records. The title is drawn from Spektor being born in the Soviet Union, and Milan Kundera's expression for the vacuous aesthetics of Stalinist-style communism (a theme in his book The Unbearable Lightness of Being). One version of the album was released with a bonus DVD, which included a short promotional film titled The Survival Guide to Soviet Kitsch and the music video for the song "Us."

== Reception ==
Professional ratings
Aggregate scores
Source	Rating
Metacritic	72/100
Review scores
Source	Rating
AllMusic	3.5/5 stars
The A.V. Club	favorable
Blender	4/5 stars
Consumer Guide	(2-star Honorable Mention)
Pitchfork	6.8/10
PopMatters	7/10
Prefix Magazine	7/10
Rolling Stone	3/5 stars
Stylus	B−

"I became obsessed with Soviet Kitsch," said British singer Kate Nash. "The songs are so powerful and raw. There's a track called 'Chemo Limo' where she sings about having kids. I was utterly convinced she had children of her own, but it's all made-up. That's one of the great things about her: she has a way of making you believe in what she's singing about."

In 2009, the album was included in NME's list of 100 greatest albums of the decade.

== Commercial performance ==
As of 2007, the album had sold 54,000 copies in the United States.

== Track listing ==
All songs written by Regina Spektor

Standard Edition
No.	Title	Length
1.	"Ode to Divorce"	3:42
2.	"Poor Little Rich Boy"	2:27
3.	"Carbon Monoxide"	4:59
4.	"The Flowers"	3:54
5.	"Us"	4:52
6.	"Sailor Song"	3:15
7.	"* * *"	0:44
8.	"Your Honor"	2:10
9.	"Ghost of Corporate Future"	3:21
10.	"Chemo Limo"	6:04
11.	"Somedays"	3:21
Total length:		38:49

Deluxe version bonus track
No.	Title	Length
12.	"Scarecrow and Fungus"	2:29

Standard vinyl release
No.	Title	Length
12.	"Scarecrow and Fungus"	2:29
13.	"December"	2:10

- Track 7 is titled "Whisper" on digital versions of the album. It is a brief spoken word piece in which Spektor and her brother, Barry "Bear" Spektor, discuss the following song ("Your Honor").

== Personnel ==
- Regina Spektor - piano, voice, rhodes, drumstick, percussion, producer, songwriter
- Alan Bezozi - producer, drums, percussion, heartbeat
- Oren Bloedow - guitar
- Graham Maby - bass
- Gordon Raphael - percussion
- Bear Spektor - whispers ("***")
- The 4x4 String Quartet - strings ("Us" and "Somedays")
- Kill Kenada - backing punk band ("Your Honor")
- Eric Biondo - songwriter (one lyric and melody sampled in "Somedays")

== Release history ==
Country	Year	Label	Format	Ref.
United States	2004	Sire	CD	
United Kingdom	2004	Shoplifter	CD	
United States	2005	Sire	CD+DVD	
United States	2005	Sire	LP	
Europe	2005	Sire	LP	
Australia	2005	Sire	CD+DVD	
Europe	2005	Sire	CD+DVD	
