= Regina Spektor =

American musician (born 1980)

- Регина Спектор
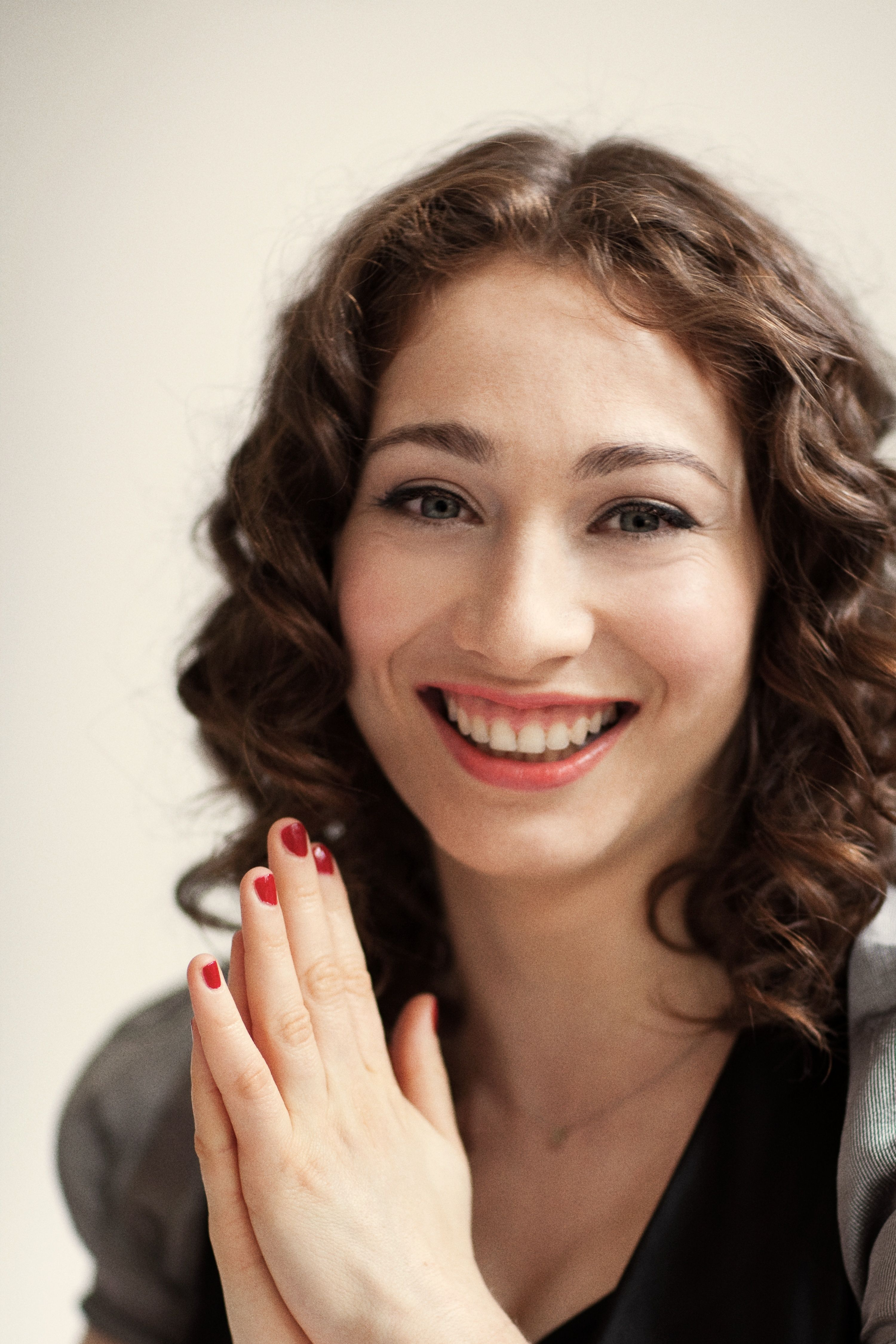
- Spektor in 2009
- Born: Regina Ilyinichna Spektor; February 18, 1980 (age 46); Moscow, Russian SFSR, Soviet Union
- Citizenship: United States (arrived 1989)
- Occupations: Singer; songwriter
- Years active: 2001–present
- Spouse: Jack Dishel (m. 2011)
- Children: 2
- Musical career
- Genres: Anti-folk; indie-pop; alternative rock
- Instruments: Vocals; piano; guitar; percussion
- Label: Sire/Warner
- Website: www.reginaspektor.com

Regina Ilyinichna Spektor (Russian: Регинa Ильинична Спектор, pronounced [rʲɪˈɡʲinə ˈspʲɛktər]; born February 18, 1980) is a Soviet-born American singer, songwriter, and pianist.

After self-releasing her first three records and gaining popularity in New York City's independent music scenes, particularly the anti-folk scene centered on the East Village, Spektor signed with Sire Records in 2004, resulting in greater mainstream recognition. After giving her third album, Soviet Kitsch, a major label re-release, Sire released Spektor's fourth album, Begin to Hope, which achieved a Gold certification by the RIAA. Her following two albums, Far and What We Saw from the Cheap Seats, each debuted at number 3 on the Billboard 200.

Mayor Bill de Blasio proclaimed June 11, 2019, Regina Spektor Day in New York City. Spektor was inducted into the Bronx Walk of Fame on May 18, 2019, by Borough President Rubén Díaz Jr.

== Early life and musical beginnings ==
Spektor was born on February 18, 1980, in Moscow, Soviet Union, to a musical Russian-Jewish family. Her father, Ilya Spektor, was a photographer and amateur violinist. Her mother, Bella Spektor, was a music professor in a Soviet college of music and taught at public elementary schools in Mount Vernon, New York, now retired. Spektor has a brother, Boruch, who was featured in the track "* * *" (or "Whisper") from her 2003 album Soviet Kitsch, and who inspired the song "Bear Spektor", which has been performed live but never officially released. Growing up in Moscow, Regina started taking piano lessons when she was seven and learned how to play the piano by practicing on a Petrof upright that her grandfather gave her mother. She grew up listening to classical music and Russian bards like Vladimir Vysotsky and Bulat Okudzhava. Her father, who obtained recordings in Eastern Europe and traded cassettes with friends in the Soviet Union, also exposed her to rock and roll bands such as the Beatles, Queen, and the Moody Blues.

The family left the Soviet Union for New York City in 1989, when Spektor was nine and a half, during the period of Perestroika, when Soviet citizens were permitted to emigrate. She had to leave her piano behind. The seriousness of her piano studies led her parents to consider not leaving the Soviet Union, but they finally decided to emigrate due to the racial, ethnic, and political discrimination that Jewish people faced. Traveling first to Austria and then Italy, the Spektor family was admitted to the United States as refugees with the assistance of HIAS (the Hebrew Immigrant Aid Society). They settled in Kingsbridge, Bronx, where Spektor graduated from SAR Academy, a Jewish day middle school in the Riverdale section of the Bronx. Since the family had been unable to bring their piano from Moscow, Spektor practiced on tabletops and other hard surfaces until she found a piano to play in the basement of her synagogue. In New York City, Spektor studied classical piano with Sonia Vargas, a professor at the Manhattan School of Music, until she was 17; Spektor's father had met Vargas through Vargas' husband, violinist Samuel Marder. Spektor attended high school for two years at the Frisch School, a yeshiva in Paramus, New Jersey, but transferred to a public school, Fair Lawn High School, in Fair Lawn, New Jersey, where she finished the last two years of her high school education.

Spektor was originally interested in classical music only, but she later grew interested in hip hop, rock, and punk as well. Although she had always made up songs around the house, she first became interested in more formal songwriting during a visit to Israel with the Nesiya Institute in her teenage years when she attracted attention from the other children on the trip for the songs she made up while hiking.

Following this trip, Spektor was exposed to the works of Joni Mitchell, Ani DiFranco, and other singer-songwriters, which encouraged her belief that she could create her own songs. She wrote her first a cappella songs around the age of 16 and her first songs for voice and piano when she was 17.

Spektor completed the four-year studio composition program of the Conservatory of Music at Purchase College within three years, graduating with honors in 2001. Around this time, she also worked briefly at a butterfly farm in Luck, Wisconsin, and studied in Tottenham (in North London) for one term.

== Career ==
=== 2001–2005: Career beginnings and Soviet Kitsch ===
Spektor gradually achieved recognition through performances in the anti-folk scene in downtown New York City, most prominently at the East Village's SideWalk Cafe. She also performed at local colleges (such as Sarah Lawrence College) with other musicians, including the Trachtenburg Family Slideshow Players. She sold self-published CDs at her performances during this period: 11:11 (2001) and Songs (2002). Spektor's first nationwide tour was accompanying the Strokes as the opening act on their 2003–2004 Room on Fire tour which included performances at The Theater at Madison Square Garden. While on the tour, she and the band performed and recorded "Modern Girls & Old Fashion Men". After the tour, Kings of Leon, who were the second opening act on the tour, invited Spektor to open for them on their own European tour. In 2004, Spektor signed a contract with Warner Brothers' record label Sire Records to publish and distribute her third album Soviet Kitsch, originally self-released in 2003. In 2005, she began making her first TV appearances including guest spots on various late-night talk shows.

In June 2005, Spektor was the opening act for the English piano rock band Keane on their North American tour, during which she performed at Radio City Music Hall on June 7, 2005.

=== 2006–2008: Begin to Hope ===
Spektor went on to release the album Begin to Hope on June 13, 2006. The album debuted at number 70 on the US Billboard 200, and due to the popularity of the single "Fidelity", it went on to peak at number 20, and was certified Gold by the RIAA. Spektor received increased attention when her video for "Fidelity" was viewed over 200,000 times in two days on YouTube. Spektor's 2006 headlining tour in support of the Begin to Hope album included back-to-back hometown shows at Town Hall Theater in New York City on September 27 and 28, 2006. This tour was Spektor's first to feature a full backing band.

Listeners of Sirius Radio's Left of Center channel voted her single "Fidelity" as the No. 1 song of 2006. Towards the end of 2006, VH1 showcased her as part of its "You Oughta Know: Artists on the Rise" featurettes, playing clips from the "Fidelity" music video and showing parts of an interview with Spektor during commercial breaks on the channel. Spektor's video for "Fidelity" reached No. 3 on VH1's Top 20 Countdown. Spektor reached No. 33 on Blender magazine's top 100 of 2006 and was also listed as one of the "Hottest Women of Rock". On January 21, 2007, she was given an extensive feature on CBS News Sunday Morning which showcased her musical beginnings and growing popularity.

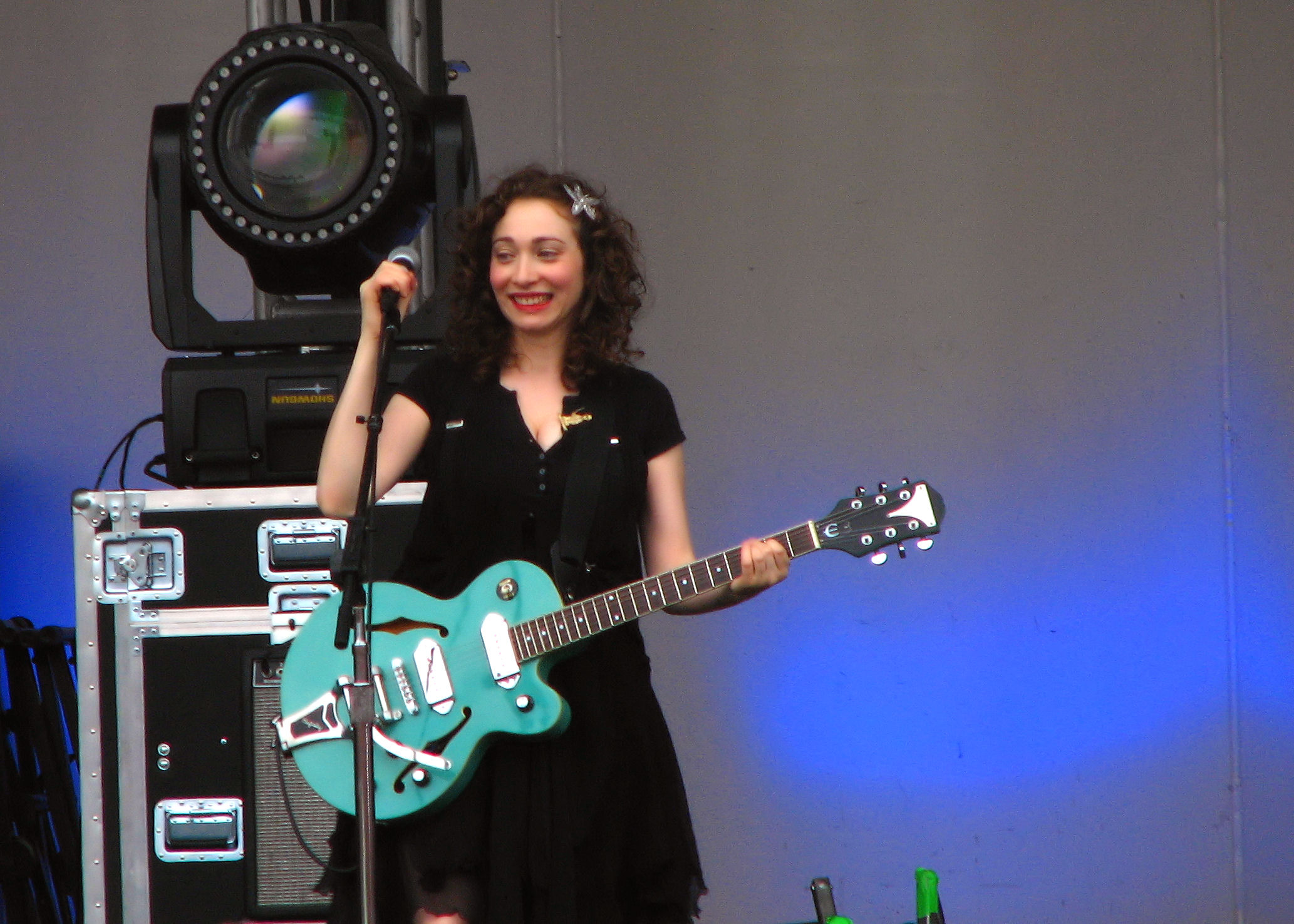
Spektor performing at Lollapalooza 2007

In 2007, Spektor began performing at several major music festivals including Coachella Valley Music and Arts Festival, Bonnaroo Music Festival, Lollapalooza, Virgin Festival, and Austin City Limits Music Festival. On October 1, 2007, her video for "Better" was released on VH1 and YouTube, where it received more than 100,000 views within the first 24 hours. Spektor performed acoustic at Neil Young's Bridge School Benefit at Shoreline Amphitheatre on October 27, 2007.

On November 14, 2007, at her concert at Ryman Auditorium in Nashville, Spektor collapsed during the sound check and was taken to a local emergency room. According to the statement given to the audience, Spektor was fine, but doctors said that she could not perform that night. It was later reported that the cause of the collapse was an inner ear infection which caused intense vertigo. The show was initially rescheduled for December 6, 2007, but the date was once again rescheduled, and the concert finally occurred on February 29, 2008. After her initial collapse in Nashville, she was able to perform in concerts at Mountain Stage, in West Virginia, on November 18, 2007 (the concert was aired in September 2008), and at Duke University on November 19, 2007.

Spektor wrote the song "The Call" for the 2008 film The Chronicles of Narnia: Prince Caspian, which appeared prominently in the film's finale sequence. She then appeared as a guest vocalist on "You Don't Know Me", a single from Ben Folds' 2008 album Way to Normal. In promotion for the single, the duo performed the song together on several late-night talk shows.

=== 2009–2011: Far ===
Spektor's fifth album, Far, was released June 23, 2009. For the record she worked with four producers: David Kahne (who had previously worked with Spektor on Begin to Hope), Mike Elizondo, Jacknife Lee, and Jeff Lynne. The record sold 50,000 copies in its first week, entering the US Billboard 200 at number three; the record remained on the chart for 19 weeks. The album peaked at number 30 and 16 in the UK and Canada, respectively. She then headlined at Serpentine Sessions, a series of concerts at London's Hyde Park on June 29, 2009. Other European performances in 2009 included Glastonbury Festival, Hultsfred Festival, Oxegen 2009, T in the Park, Paradiso, Latitude Festival, and Rock Werchter. Spektor invited Brooklyn-based rock band Jupiter One to open concerts on her 2009 North American tour. As a part of that tour, on October 14, 2009, Spektor headlined a concert at Radio City Music Hall in NYC. On September 16, 2009, it was announced that Spektor would write the music for the musical Beauty, a modern adaptation of the fairy tale Sleeping Beauty, which was initially set to open during the 2011–12 Broadway season. Regina made her Saturday Night Live debut on October 10, 2009, performing "Eet" and "The Calculation" off of Far.

In May 2010, Spektor performed for Barack and Michelle Obama along with hundreds of other guests at the White House reception in honor of Jewish American Heritage Month. She performed "Us" and "The Sword & The Pen."

=== 2012–2015: What We Saw from the Cheap Seats ===
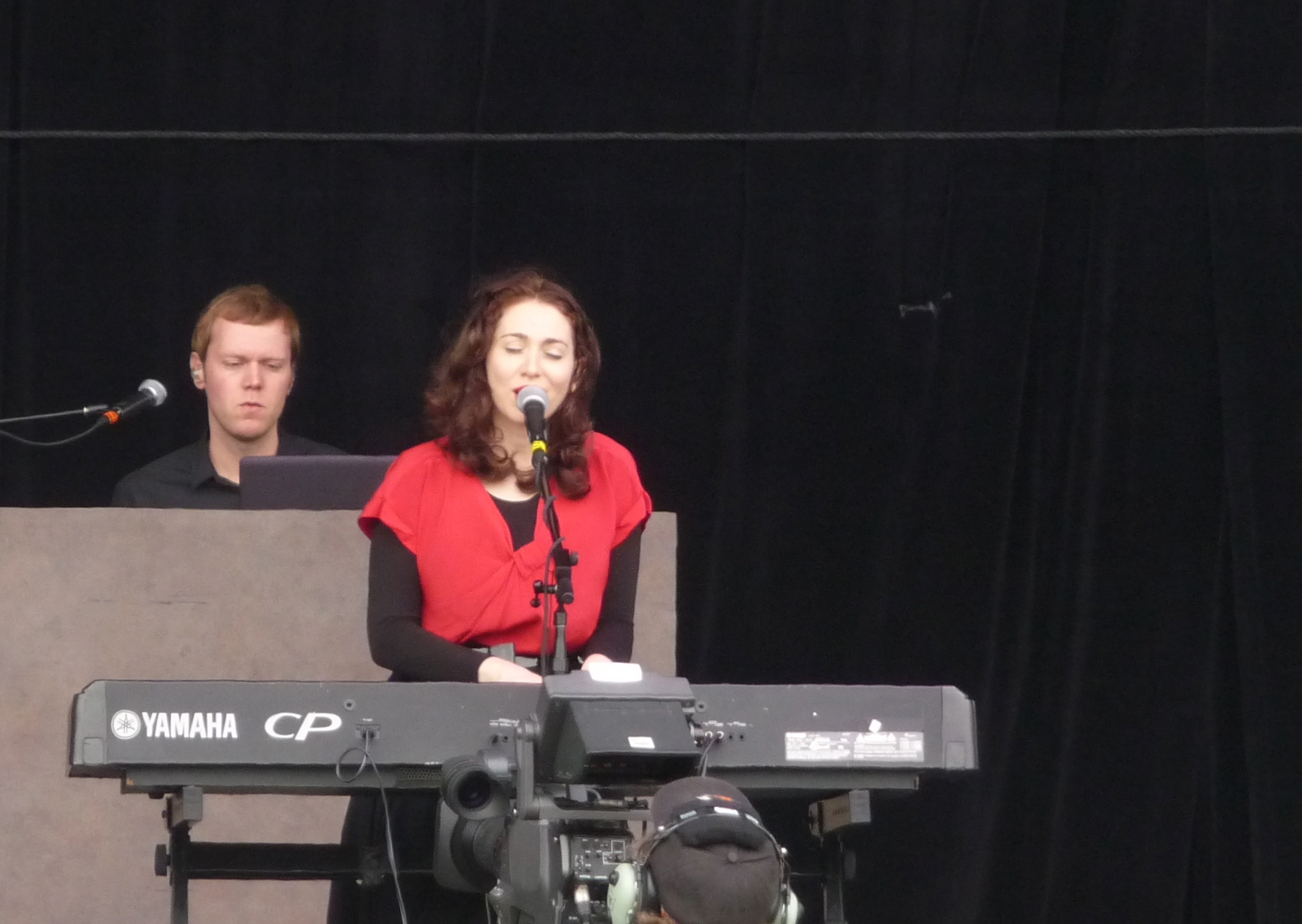
Spektor performing at the Outside Lands Music and Arts Festival 2012

Spektor's sixth album, What We Saw from the Cheap Seats, was released May 29, 2012. Like her previous album, it debuted at number three on the Billboard 200. Promotional appearances for the record included Spektor appearing on the June 7, 2012, episode of The Colbert Report, where she performed "Small Town Moon", as well as "Ballad of a Politician" as online bonus content. Her world tour in support of What We Saw from the Cheap Seats included a performance in Moscow; Spektor had not returned since leaving with her family in 1989.

In 2012, Spektor was named an official "Steinway Artist"; she plays Steinway & Sons pianos almost exclusively.

Spektor wrote and recorded the main title theme song, "You've Got Time", for the Netflix original series Orange Is the New Black, which premiered in July 2013. It was nominated in the Best Song Written for Visual Media category at the 56th Annual Grammy Awards.

=== 2016–2021: Remember Us to Life ===
Spektor announced her seventh album, Remember Us to Life, on July 21, 2016, through her email newsletter. The album was released on September 30, 2016. The first single, "Bleeding Heart", was released July 22, 2016. The follow-up single, "Small Bill$", was released August 11, 2016. Regina Spektor performed George Harrison's "While My Guitar Gently Weeps", released August 5, 2016, for the film Kubo and the Two Strings.

In 2016, Spektor was one of the artists featured on The Hamilton Mixtape; she sings a remix of "Dear Theodosia" with Ben Folds.

In 2017, Spektor was featured as a guest singer on the title track to Gypsy-punk band Gogol Bordello's studio album Seekers and Finders. Spektor was also featured as a guest vocalist on Odesza's song "Just A Memory" from their album A Moment Apart.

On November 8, 2018, Spektor released a new song entitled "Birdsong", written specially for an episode of the Amazon Prime series The Romanoffs.

On March 25, 2019, Spektor announced she would be bringing her music to Broadway as the Artist in Residency at the Lunt-Fontanne Theatre for five performances June 20–26, 2019.

On July 26, 2019, Spektor released an acoustic version of her own song "You've Got Time", coinciding with the release of the seventh and final season of Orange Is the New Black. The song is featured in the final episode of the series.

In late 2019, Spektor released a new song, "Walking Away", for Amazon Prime Original Series Modern Love.

=== 2022–present: Home, Before and After ===
On February 22, 2022, Spektor announced her eighth studio album Home, Before and After with a June 24 release date, alongside the release of the album's lead single "Becoming All Alone". Recorded in upstate New York, the album was produced by Spektor and John Congleton.

She performed an NPR Tiny Desk Concert on August 5, 2022, including "Becoming All Alone" from her new album as well as tunes from past releases such as "Fidelity" and "Samson".

== Artistry ==
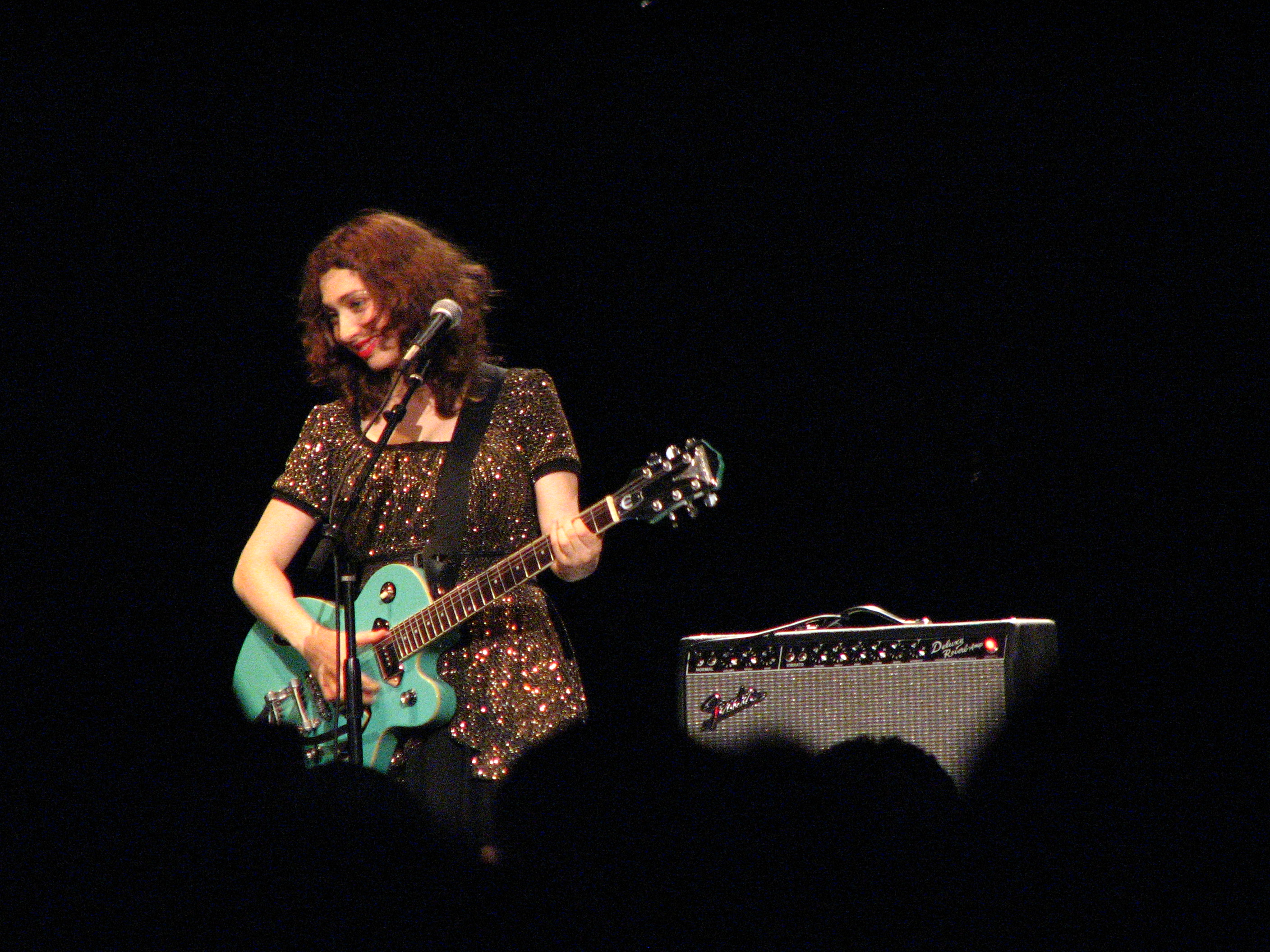
Spektor performing at the Hammerstein Ballroom in 2007

Spektor's primary instrument is the piano, and she plays the guitar as a secondary instrument, primarily playing on a seafoam Epiphone Wildkat archtop hollow-body electric guitar for live performances.

Spektor has said that she has created a great number of songs but rarely writes any of them down. Spektor's songs are not usually autobiographical but are based on scenarios and characters drawn from her imagination. Her songs show influences from folk, punk, rock, Jewish, Russian, hip hop, jazz, and classical music. Spektor has said that she works hard to ensure that each of her songs has its own musical style, rather than trying to develop a distinctive style for her music as a whole: "It doesn't feel natural for me to write some diary type song. I want to write a classic like "Yesterday" but weird songs about meatballs in refrigerators come into my head – I can't help it."

Spektor performs using a broad vocal range, with a falsetto extension, but without any apparent break. She explores a variety of different and somewhat unorthodox vocal techniques, such as verses composed entirely of buzzing noises made with the lips and beatbox-style flourishes in the middle of ballads, and also makes use of such unusual musical techniques as using a drum stick to tap rhythms on the body of a chair. Part of her style also results from the exaggeration of certain aspects of vocalization, most notably the glottal stop, prominent in the single "Fidelity". She also uses a strong New York accent on some words, which she has said is due to her love of New York and its culture.

Spektor usually sings in English, though she sometimes includes a few words or verses of Latin, Russian, French, or other languages. She plays with pronunciations, which she told NPR was a remnant of her early years when she listened to pop in English without understanding the lyrics.

Her lyrics are equally eclectic, often taking the form of abstract narratives or first-person character studies, similar to short stories or vignettes put to song. Some of Spektor's lyrics include literary allusions, such as: F. Scott Fitzgerald and Ernest Hemingway in "Poor Little Rich Boy"; The Little Prince in "Baobabs"; Virginia Woolf and Margaret Atwood in "Paris"; Ezra Pound and The Merchant of Venice in "Pound of Flesh"; Boris Pasternak in "Après Moi"; Samson and Delilah in "Samson"; Oedipus Rex in "Oedipus"; Edith Wharton's Ethan Frome in "2.99¢ Blues". Recurring themes and topics in Spektor's lyrics include love, death, religion (particularly biblical and Jewish references), city life (particularly New York references), and certain key phrases that recur in different songs, such as references to gravediggers, the Tree of Knowledge of Good and Evil, and the name "Mary Ann". Spektor's use of satire is evident in "Wasteside", which refers to The Twelve Chairs, the classic satirical novel by the Soviet authors Ilf and Petrov, and describes the town in which people are born, get their hair cut, and then are sent to the cemetery.

Spektor's first album, 11:11, was recorded and self-released while she was still in college. It differs from Spektor's later releases as she was heavily influenced by blues and jazz at the time of its recording. Her second album, Songs, was recorded on Christmas Day, 2001. Each song was recorded with just one take and is entirely acoustic. The session from which the album was derived was not originally intended as an album recording session. Her third album, Soviet Kitsch, featured strings on several songs and was her first to feature a full rock band. Upon signing with a major label, which provided a bigger budget for production and studio time, Spektor began to emphasise production and more prominently use traditional pop and rock instruments.

Spektor says the records that most impact her are those of "bands whose music is really involved". She cites the Beatles, Bob Dylan, Nirvana, Madonna, Eminem, Kate Bush, Rufus Wainwright, David Bowie, the Ramones, Patti Smith, Billie Holiday, Radiohead, Tom Waits, and Frédéric Chopin as prime influences.

British singer Kate Nash said, "I related to her because she's a woman who plays the piano and writes imaginative songs. I've played the piano since I was about seven but I'd never seen it as an instrument for pop music. Regina Spektor made the piano cool… I love the fact that her accent shines through. When I started making music, it inspired me to sing the way I talk, because that's what's real."

== Appearances in the media ==
=== Television ===
Spektor has written and recorded a number of songs for television, including "You've Got Time" the theme song for the Netflix series Orange is the New Black in 2013, "Birdsong" for the Amazon's The Romanoffs in 2018, and "Walking Away" for Amazon's Modern Love in 2019. She also covered "Little Boxes" by Malvina Reynolds for Showtime's television series Weeds, which was used as the title song in the episode "Mile Deep and a Foot Wide" (2006); her original recording "Ghost of Corporate Future" was used both at the beginning and end of this episode.

=== Film ===
Spektor wrote and recorded "The Call" for the 2008 film The Chronicles of Narnia: Prince Caspian and "One Little Soldier" for the 2019 film Bombshell. She also covered "While My Guitar Gently Weeps" by The Beatles for the 2016 animated film Kubo and the Two Strings.

=== Advertising ===
In late-2005, "Us" was used in a commercial as part of the What Do You Want To Watch? series for the United Kingdom's British Sky Broadcasting. In the summer of 2006, a clip from the same song was used for the teaser website for Microsoft's Zune project at ComingZune.com, as well as for a promotional campaign for MtvU, and by Dutch telecom company KPN in a commercial.

"Fidelity" was used in the trailer for the 2007 film 27 Dresses.

== Personal life ==
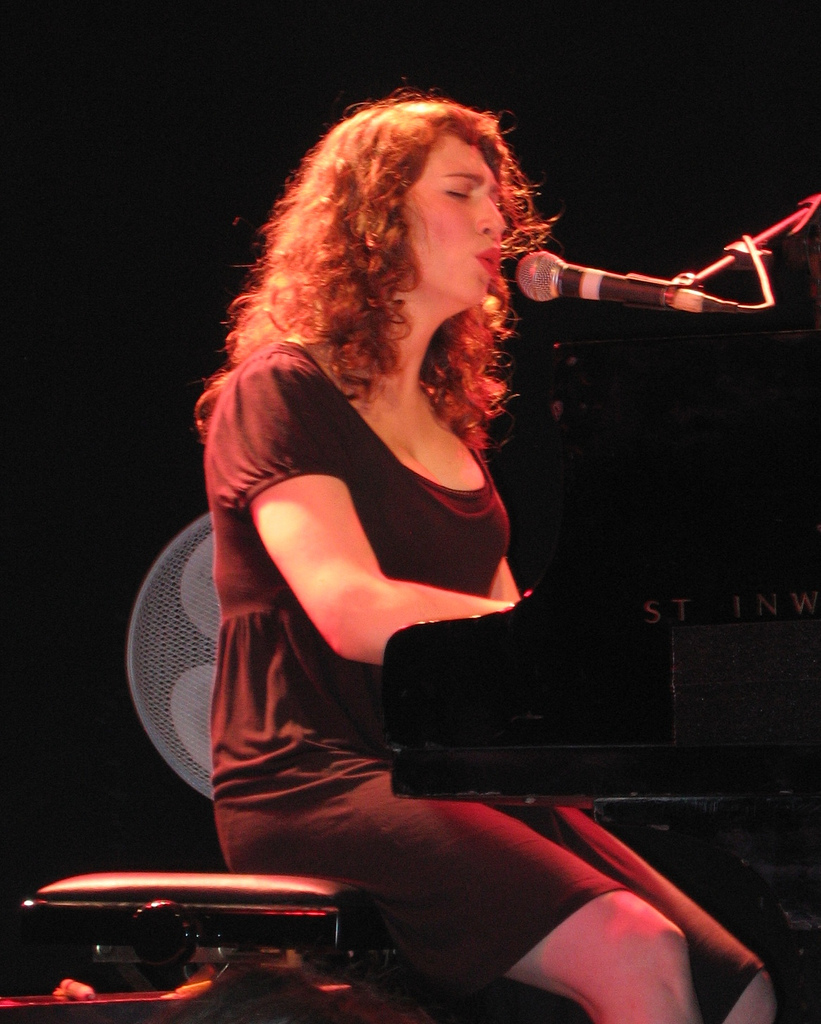
Spektor performing "Après Moi" in Tel Aviv in 2006

=== Jewish identity ===
Spektor is fluent in Russian and reads Hebrew. She has described herself as "very Russian Jewish." She has paid tribute to her Russian heritage, quoting the poem "February" by the Russian poet Boris Pasternak in her song "Après Moi", and stated that she is "very connected to the language and the culture." Spektor visited Moscow in July 2012, when she toured through Russia in support of her sixth album, What We Saw from the Cheap Seats.

In a 2016 interview on NPR, Spektor discussed how her experiences and struggles as an immigrant youth in New York contributed to the album Remember Us to Life, whose title is a phrase from the Yom Kippur liturgy (זכרינו לחיים) that she encountered while pregnant. She frequently pays tribute to her Jewish identity and talks about the antisemitism she experienced and the intergenerational traumas associated with this identity.

=== Political views ===
==== Political orientation ====
Spektor considers herself politically liberal and has made public statements with progressive positions on issues such as abortion access, as well as undertaking numerous progressive philanthropic endeavours. Her songs have included progressive commentary on political issues, such as "Ghost of Corporate Future" which critiques capitalism and "Baby Jesus", which satirizes religious fundamentalism.

She admires former President of the United States Barack Obama, but also stated that his initial opposition to same-sex marriage was "as embarrassing as white-only drinking fountains". Her song "Fidelity" was used in a campaign against Proposition 8, which sought to ban same-sex marriage in California. She also deplored the election of Donald Trump as President of the United States in 2016.

==== Ukraine ====
In February 2022, Spektor condemned the Russian invasion of Ukraine. In August 2023, she said that "the horrible war in Ukraine breaks all our hearts", and that when she was leaving the Soviet Union during Gorbachev's Perestroika, "it really felt like things were going to turn around and there would be this incredible awakening and there was going to be a shift of freedom and a chance. But the idea that it's actually clamped down and is much less free and much scarier than when I left is very hard for me to understand."

==== Israel ====
Spektor is a supporter of Israel and has performed in Israel on several occasions. In 2008, she performed at a ceremony at the National Mall celebrating the 60th anniversary of the establishment of the state of Israel. She has also expressed support for the country amidst various escalations of the Arab–Israeli conflict, especially during the Gaza war. She has said that Israel is protecting Europe and the United States "from the gates of hell".

In 2009, during Operation Cast Lead, she criticized the media for not portraying Israel's actions as self-defence. In August 2022, during Operation Breaking Dawn, she stated that she felt Israel was being unfairly criticized for killing members of the Palestinian Islamic Jihad while other countries were celebrated for killing "militant jihadists".

In 2016, she spoke against calls for artists to stop holding concerts in Israel as part of the Boycott, Divestment and Sanctions (BDS) movement, stating that "[b]y not playing in Israel, you're punishing the wrong people."

Spektor has voiced her support for Israel during the ongoing Gaza war, and has frequently faced criticism for doing so. In 2023, she expressed sadness and anger on Instagram at the "largest massacre of Jews since the Holocaust" in the days following the October 7 attacks. On October 30, she made another Instagram post questioning the calls for a ceasefire instead of demanding that Hamas surrender and return the hostages. In another Instagram post said she did not support a cease fire, but wanted "to liberate Gaza from Hamas".

In November 2023, Spektor responded negatively to an Instagram post made by Björk that criticized Israel's displacement of Palestinians. Spektor claimed that this infographic was false propaganda and was ignorant of the nuances of the situation, whilst also expressing disappointment as Björk had been one of her musical idols. At this time, Spektor also expressed dismay at what she said was the political left's characterization of Israel as committing genocide in Gaza and stated that their positions landed them "shoulder to shoulder with Hamas".

In October 2024, on the anniversary of the October 7 attacks, Spektor performed at a pro-Israel rally in New York, led by the UJA-Federation, the Jewish Community Relations Council of New York, and the Hostages and Missing Families Forum, which focused on the bloodshed of the massacre the year prior and the hostages who remained captive.

In July 2025, Spektor was heckled mid-way through her concert in Portland with chants of "Free Palestine". She accused the hecklers of "just yelling at a Jew", suggesting that this was an example of antisemitism and that she was being "othered". After stating that this was "real life" and not an "internet comment section", an audience member, referencing the famine in Gaza, replied, "...there is a genocide happening. I'm watching dying children. That hurts." Spektor responded that she did not want to discuss the subject and encouraged those unhappy with her position to leave, which some did.

=== Family ===
She married singer-songwriter Jack Dishel in 2011. Formerly a guitarist with the band the Moldy Peaches, Dishel performs as Only Son, and duets with Spektor in the song "Call Them Brothers". They have two children.

== Philanthropy ==
In 2007, Spektor covered John Lennon's "Real Love" for Instant Karma: The Amnesty International Campaign to Save Darfur. The following year in 2008, she contributed her song "Better" from Begin to Hope to the compilation album Songs for Tibet: The Art of Peace, an initiative to support of human rights in Tibet and the 14th Dalai Lama.

On January 22, 2009, Spektor performed at the third annual Roe on the Rocks gig at the Bowery Ballroom to raise money for Planned Parenthood New York City. Continuing with her support for Tibet, Regina Spektor played for Tibet House's annual concert at Carnegie Hall on February 26, 2010. Less than one month later, on March 23, 2010, Spektor gave a concert at the Fillmore at Irving Plaza in New York City to raise funds for the work of Médecins Sans Frontières in Haiti. On April 27, she released a cover of Radiohead's song "No Surprises", for which all proceeds went to Médecins Sans Frontières to help earthquake victims in Haiti and Chile.

In February 2012, Spektor featured in a benefit concert at Rose Hall for HIAS, an organization that helped a young Spektor and her family emigrate from the Soviet Union. Spektor also has taken part in several memorial and benefit concerts for the family of Dan Cho, her former cellist, who died while on tour with her in 2010.

== Discography ==
Studio albums

- 11:11 (2001)
- Songs (2002)
- Soviet Kitsch (2003)
- Begin to Hope (2006)
- Far (2009)
- What We Saw from the Cheap Seats (2012)
- Remember Us to Life (2016)
- Home, Before and After (2022)

== Awards and nominations ==
MVPA Awards

Year	Nominee / work	Award	Result
2006	"Us"	Best Director of New Artist	Nominated
2006	"Us"	Best Directional Debut	Nominated
2006	"Us"	Best Animated Video	Nominated
2007	"Fidelity"	Best Director of a Female Artist	Nominated
2007	"Fidelity"	Best Adult Contemporary Video	Nominated
2008	"Better"	Best Alternative Video	Nominated

Other awards

Year	Association	Category	Nominated work	Result
2005	Antville Music Video Awards	Best Video	"Us"	Nominated
2006	Shortlist Music Prize	Shortlist Music Prize	Begin to Hope	Nominated
2006	Groovevolt Music and Fashion Awards	Best Rock Album - Female	Soviet Kitsch	Nominated
2007	Planeta Awards	Best Female Vocal Interpretation	"Fidelity"	Nominated
2007	Planeta Awards	Best Pop/Hip-Hop Artist/Band of the Year	Herself	Nominated
2008	Pollstar Concert Industry Awards	Best New Touring Artist	Herself	Nominated
2009	Studio8 Media International Music Awards	Studio8's Female Voice of August 2009	Herself	Won
2011	New York Music Awards	Best Female Rock Vocalist	Herself	Won
2011	New York Music Awards	Best Live Recording	Live in London	Won
2012	MTV Video Music Awards	Best Art Direction	"All the Rowboats"	Nominated
2014	Grammy Award	Best Song Written for Visual Media	"You've Got Time"	Nominated
2015	Broadcast Music, Inc.	BMI Streaming Media Awards	"You've Got Time"	Won
2020	Guild of Music Supervisors Awards	Best Song Written and/or Recorded for a Film	"One Little Soldier" (from Bombshell)	Won

- 2019 Bronx Walk of Fame
