= Mike Elizondo discography =

American producer, songwriter, and musician Mike Elizondo has worked with artists including 50 Cent, Eminem, Carrie Underwood, Fiona Apple, Mastodon, Ry Cooder, and Twenty One Pilots. His songwriting credits include "In Da Club" by 50 Cent, Eminem's "Just Lose It" and "The Real Slim Shady", "Family Affair" by Mary J. Blige, and Carrie Underwood's "Cowboy Casanova".

Year	Title	Artist	Album	Credit		Notes
Year	Title	Artist	Album	Producer	Songwriter	Notes
2026	"Crazy Cryin'"	Tedeschi Trucks Band	Future Soul	check		
2026	"I Got You"	Tedeschi Trucks Band	Future Soul	check		
2026	"Who Am I"	Tedeschi Trucks Band	Future Soul	check		
2026	"Hero"	Tedeschi Trucks Band	Future Soul	check		
2026	"What in the World"	Tedeschi Trucks Band	Future Soul	check		
2026	"Future Soul"	Tedeschi Trucks Band	Future Soul	check		
2026	"Under the Knife"	Tedeschi Trucks Band	Future Soul	check		
2026	"Be Kind"	Tedeschi Trucks Band	Future Soul	check		
2026	"Devil Be Gone"	Tedeschi Trucks Band	Future Soul	check		
2026	"Shout Out"	Tedeschi Trucks Band	Future Soul	check		
2026	"Ride On"	Tedeschi Trucks Band	Future Soul	check		
2025	"Garbage"	Twenty One Pilots	Breach	check		
2025	"Robot Voices"	Twenty One Pilots	Breach	check		
2025	"Big Money"	Jon Batiste	Big Money	check	check	
2025	"Because, Of Course"	Maren Morris	Dreamsicle		check	
2025	"Relapse"	Warren Zeiders	Relapse, Lies, & Betrayal	check		
2025	"Betrayal"	Warren Zeiders	Relapse, Lies, & Betrayal	check		
2025	"Bad"	Warren Zeiders	Relapse, Lies, & Betrayal	check		
2025	"Crying Whiskey"	Warren Zeiders	Relapse, Lies, & Betrayal	check		
2025	"Without You"	Warren Zeiders	Relapse, Lies, & Betrayal	check		
2025	"Intoxicated"	Warren Zeiders	Relapse, Lies, & Betrayal	check		
2025	"Go Outside!"	Alessia Cara	Love & Hyperbole (Deluxe Edition)	check	check	
2025	"Dead Man"	Alessia Cara	Love & Hyperbole (Deluxe Edition)	check	check	
2025	"Subside"	Alessia Cara	Love & Hyperbole (Deluxe Edition)	check	check	
2025	"Drive"	Alessia Cara	Love & Hyperbole (Deluxe Edition)	check		
2025	"Nighttime Thing"	Alessia Cara	Love & Hyperbole (Deluxe Edition)	check		
2025	"Fire"	Alessia Cara	Love & Hyperbole (Deluxe Edition)	check		
2025	"Slow Motion"	Alessia Cara	Love & Hyperbole (Deluxe Edition)	check	check	
2025	"Sunday"	Alessia Cara	Love & Hyperbole (Deluxe Edition)	check		
2025	"Dead Man (Acoustic Version)	Alessia Cara	Love & Hyperbole (Deluxe Edition)		check	
2024	"Heavy Is the Crown"	Linkin Park	From Zero	check	check	
2024	"Overflow"	Linkin Park	From Zero	check	check	
2024	"Survive the Night"	Lin-Manuel Miranda & Eisa Davis	Warriors	check		
2024	"Roll Call"	Lin-Manuel Miranda & Eisa Davis	Warriors	check		
2024	"Warriors' Cypher"	Lin-Manuel Miranda & Eisa Davis	Warriors	check		
2024	"Make Way For Cyrus"	Lin-Manuel Miranda & Eisa Davis	Warriors	check		
2024	"If You Can Count"	Lin-Manuel Miranda & Eisa Davis	Warriors	check		
2024	"Derailed"	Lin-Manuel Miranda & Eisa Davis	Warriors	check		
2024	"Woodlawn Cemetary"	Lin-Manuel Miranda & Eisa Davis	Warriors	check		
2024	"Leave the Bronx Alive"	Lin-Manuel Miranda & Eisa Davis	Warriors	check		
2024	"A Track Fire and a Phone Call"	Lin-Manuel Miranda & Eisa Davis	Warriors	check		
2024	"Going Down"	Lin-Manuel Miranda & Eisa Davis	Warriors	check		
2024	"Orphan Town"	Lin-Manuel Miranda & Eisa Davis	Warriors	check		
2024	"Call Me Mercy"	Lin-Manuel Miranda & Eisa Davis	Warriors	check		
2024	"Still Breathin'"	Lin-Manuel Miranda & Eisa Davis	Warriors	check		
2024	"Quiet Girls"	Lin-Manuel Miranda & Eisa Davis	Warriors	check		
2024	"Outside Gray's Papaya"	Lin-Manuel Miranda & Eisa Davis	Warriors	check		
2024	"Sick of Runnin'"	Lin-Manuel Miranda & Eisa Davis	Warriors	check		
2024	"The Park at Night"	Lin-Manuel Miranda & Eisa Davis	Warriors	check		
2024	"Luther Interlude"	Lin-Manuel Miranda & Eisa Davis	Warriors	check		
2024	"Cardigans"	Lin-Manuel Miranda & Eisa Davis	Warriors	check		
2024	"We Got You"	Lin-Manuel Miranda & Eisa Davis	Warriors	check		
2024	"A Light or Something"	Lin-Manuel Miranda & Eisa Davis	Warriors	check		
2024	"We Got You (Reprise)"	Lin-Manuel Miranda & Eisa Davis	Warriors	check		
2024	"Somewhere in the City"	Lin-Manuel Miranda & Eisa Davis	Warriors	check		
2024	"Reunion Square"	Lin-Manuel Miranda & Eisa Davis	Warriors	check		
2024	"Same Train Home"	Lin-Manuel Miranda & Eisa Davis	Warriors	check		
2024	"Finale"	Lin-Manuel Miranda & Eisa Davis	Warriors	check		
2024	"Change"	The Chattahoochies	Change	check		
2024	"Sharks"	The Warning	Keep Me Fed		check	
2024	"Consume"	The Warning	Keep Me Fed		check	
2024	"Be Okay (feat. Ellie Holcomb)"	Lauren Daigle	Be Okay (feat. Ellie Holcomb)	check		
2024	"Good Together"	Lake Street Dive	Good Together	check	check	
2024	"Dance With A Stranger"	Lake Street Dive	Good Together	check	check	
2024	"Far Gone"	Lake Street Dive	Good Together	check	check	
2024	"Get Around"	Lake Street Dive	Good Together	check	check	
2024	"Help Is On The Way"	Lake Street Dive	Good Together	check	check	
2024	"Walking Uphill"	Lake Street Dive	Good Together	check	check	
2024	"Better Not Tell You"	Lake Street Dive	Good Together	check	check	
2024	"Seats At The Bar"	Lake Street Dive	Good Together	check	check	
2024	"Twenty-Five"	Lake Street Dive	Good Together	check	check	
2024	"Party On The Roof"	Lake Street Dive	Good Together	check	check	
2024	"Set Sail (Prometheus And Eros)"	Lake Street Dive	Good Together	check	check	
2024	"Fire Inside"	Various	Thelma The Unicorn (Soundtrack from the Netflix Film)	check		
2024	"Blubber Trouble"	Various	Thelma The Unicorn (Soundtrack from the Netflix Film)	check		
2024	"Hurricane"	Various	Thelma The Unicorn (Soundtrack from the Netflix Film)	check		
2024	"Big"	Various	Thelma The Unicorn (Soundtrack from the Netflix Film)	check		
2024	"3 C's To Success"	Various	Thelma The Unicorn (Soundtrack from the Netflix Film)	check		
2024	"Here Come The Cud"	Various	Thelma The Unicorn (Soundtrack from the Netflix Film)	check		
2024	"Only Unicorn"	Various	Thelma The Unicorn (Soundtrack from the Netflix Film)	check		
2024	"Just As You Are"	Various	Thelma The Unicorn (Soundtrack from the Netflix Film)	check		
2024	"Goldmine"	Various	Thelma The Unicorn (Soundtrack from the Netflix Film)	check		
2024	"Could It Be"	YUQI	YUQ1		check	
2024	"Take The 'O' Outta Country"	The Chattahoochies	Take The 'O' Outta Country	check		
2024	"Alarm Clock"	Sheryl Crow	Evolution (Deluxe)	check	check	
2024	"Digging In The Dirt (feat. Peter Gabriel)"	Sheryl Crow	Evolution (Deluxe)	check		
2024	"Love Life"	Sheryl Crow	Evolution (Deluxe)	check	check	
2024	"You Can't Change The Weather"	Sheryl Crow	Evolution (Deluxe)	check		
2024	"Evolution"	Sheryl Crow	Evolution (Deluxe)	check		
2024	"Where?"	Sheryl Crow	Evolution (Deluxe)	check		
2024	"Don't Walk Away"	Sheryl Crow	Evolution (Deluxe)	check		
2024	"Broken Record"	Sheryl Crow	Evolution (Deluxe)	check		
2024	"Waiting In The Wings"	Sheryl Crow	Evolution (Deluxe)	check	check	
2024	"Break Mine"	Brothers Osborne	Break Mine EP	check		
2024	"We Ain't Good At Breaking Up"	Brothers Osborne	Break Mine EP	check		
2024	"Back Home"	Brothers Osborne	Break Mine EP	check		
2024	"Get To Movin' Again"	Brothers Osborne	Break Mine EP	check		
2024	"I Won't Back Down"	Brothers Osborne	I Won't Back Down	check		
2024	"These Are The Days (feat. Blessing Offor)"	Lauren Daigle	These Are The Days (feat. Blessing Offor)	check	check	
2023	"Talladega 10"	The Chattahoochies	Talladega 10	check		
2023	"Pank Drank"	The Chattahoochies	Pank Drank	check		
2023	"Esperando Pelitos"	Lin Manuel Miranda, Big Mouth Cast	Esperando Pelitos	check		
2023	"Perfect"	Various	TROLLS Band Together (Original Motion Picture Soundtrack)	check	check	
2023	"Watch Me Work"	Various	TROLLS Band Together (Original Motion Picture Soundtrack)	check	check	
2023	"It Takes Two"	Various	TROLLS Band Together (Original Motion Picture Soundtrack)	check	check	
2023	"Family"	Various	TROLLS Band Together (Original Motion Picture Soundtrack)	check	check	
2023	"I Dodged a Mullet"	The Chattahoochies	I Dodged A Mullet	check		
2023	"Bad Tattoo"	Cannons	Bad Tattoo	check	check	
2023	"Who Says You Can't Have Everything"	Brothers Osborne	Brothers Osborne	check		
2023	"Nobody's Nobody"	Brothers Osborne	Brothers Osborne	check	check	
2023	"Might As Well Be Me"	Brothers Osborne	Brothers Osborne	check		
2023	"Sun Ain't Even Gone Down Yet"	Brothers Osborne	Brothers Osborne	check		
2023	"Goodbye's Kickin' In"	Brothers Osborne	Brothers Osborne	check	check	
2023	"Love You Too"	Brothers Osborne	Brothers Osborne	check		
2023	"New Bad Habit"	Brothers Osborne	Brothers Osborne	check		
2023	"We Ain't Good At Breaking Up (feat. Miranda Lambert)"	Brothers Osborne	Brothers Osborne	check		
2023	"Back Home"	Brothers Osborne	Brothers Osborne	check		
2023	"Ain't Nobody Got Time For That"	Brothers Osborne	Brothers Osborne	check		
2023	"Rollercoaster (Forever And A Day)"	Brothers Osborne	Brothers Osborne	check		
2023	"Thank God I Do"	Lauren Daigle	Lauren Daigle	check		
2023	"Saint Ferdinand (feat. Jon Batiste & Natalie Hemby)"	Lauren Daigle	Lauren Daigle	check	check	
2023	"New"	Lauren Daigle	Lauren Daigle	check	check	
2023	"Waiting"	Lauren Daigle	Lauren Daigle	check		
2023	"To Know Me"	Lauren Daigle	Lauren Daigle	check		
2023	"Kaleidoscope Jesus"	Lauren Daigle	Lauren Daigle	check	check	
2023	"Valuable"	Lauren Daigle	Lauren Daigle	check	check	
2023	"Don't Believe Them"	Lauren Daigle	Lauren Daigle	check		
2023	"Ego"	Lauren Daigle	Lauren Daigle	check	check	
2023	"These Are The Days"	Lauren Daigle	Lauren Daigle	check	check	
2023	"Salvation Mountain (feat. Gary Clark Jr.)"	Lauren Daigle	Lauren Daigle	check		
2023	"Back To Me"	Lauren Daigle	Lauren Daigle	check		
2023	"21 Days"	Lauren Daigle	Lauren Daigle	check	check	
2023	"Love Me Still"	Lauren Daigle	Lauren Daigle	check		
2023	"Interlude #1"	Lauren Daigle	Lauren Daigle	check	check	
2023	"Turbulent Skies"	Lauren Daigle	Lauren Daigle	check	check	
2023	"Sometimes"	Lauren Daigle	Lauren Daigle	check		
2023	"Interlude #2"	Lauren Daigle	Lauren Daigle	check		
2023	"Inherited"	Lauren Daigle	Lauren Daigle	check		
2023	"He's Never Gunna Change"	Lauren Daigle	Lauren Daigle	check	check	
2023	"Be Okay"	Lauren Daigle	Lauren Daigle	check		
2023	"Interlude #3"	Lauren Daigle	Lauren Daigle	check		
2023	"You're All I'll Take With Me"	Lauren Daigle	Lauren Daigle	check		
2023	"Keeping The Light On"	Joy Oladokun	Proof Of Life	check	check	
2023	"Sweet Symphony (feat. Chris Stapleton)"	Joy Oladokun	Proof Of Life	check		
2023	"Revolution (with Maxo Kream)"	Joy Oladokun	Proof Of Life	check	check	
2023	"Friends (with Mt. Joy)"	Joy Oladokun	Proof Of Life	check		
2023	"Spotlight"	Joy Oladokun	Proof Of Life	check	check	
2023	"Celebrants"	Nickel Creek	Celebrants		check	
2023	"Strangers"	Nickel Creek	Celebrants		check	
2023	"Water Under The Bridge, Pt. 1"	Nickel Creek	Celebrants		check	
2023	"The Meadow"	Nickel Creek	Celebrants		check	
2023	"Thinnest Wall"	Nickel Creek	Celebrants		check	
2023	"Going Out..."	Nickel Creek	Celebrants		check	
2023	"Holding Pattern"	Nickel Creek	Celebrants		check	
2023	"Where The Long Line Leads"	Nickel Creek	Celebrants		check	
2023	"Goddamned Saint"	Nickel Creek	Celebrants		check	
2023	"Stone's Throw"	Nickel Creek	Celebrants		check	
2023	"Goddamned Saint (Reprise)"	Nickel Creek	Celebrants		check	
2023	"From The Beach"	Nickel Creek	Celebrants		check	
2023	"To The Airport"	Nickel Creek	Celebrants		check	
2023	"...Despite The Weather"	Nickel Creek	Celebrants		check	
2023	"Hollywood Ending"	Nickel Creek	Celebrants		check	
2023	"New Blood"	Nickel Creek	Celebrants		check	
2023	"Water Under The Bridge, Pt. 2"	Nickel Creek	Celebrants		check	
2023	"Failure Isn't Forever"	Nickel Creek	Celebrants		check	
2023	"ME"	Meg Myers	TZIA	check		
2023	"T33NAGERS"	Meg Myers	TZIA	check	check	
2022	"FYB"	Poppy	Stagger	check		
2022	"Shapes"	Poppy	Stagger	check		
2022	"Anywhere"	Madison Cunningham	Revealer	check		
2022	"Who Are You Now"	Madison Cunningham	Revealer	check		
2022	"Collider Particles"	Madison Cunningham	Revealer	check	check	
2022	"Your Hate Could Power A Train"	Madison Cunningham	Revealer	check	check	
2022	"Our Rebellion"	Madison Cunningham	Revealer	check		
2022	"Sara And The Silent Crowd"	Madison Cunningham	Revealer	check		
2022	"Figure It Out"	Grace VanderWaal, Various	Hollywood Stargirl (Original Soundtrack)	check	check	
2022	"Running With The Angels"	Brittany Howard, Tia P.	Running With The Angels	check		
2022	"WTF"	Sasha Sloan	I Blame The World	check		
2021	"The Family Madrigal"	Various	Encanto Original Motion Picture Soundtrack	check		
2021	"Waiting On A Miracle"	Various	Encanto Original Motion Picture Soundtrack	check		
2021	"Surface Pressure"	Various	Encanto Original Motion Picture Soundtrack	check		
2021	"We Don't Talk About Bruno"	Various	Encanto Original Motion Picture Soundtrack	check		
2021	"What Else Can I Do"	Various	Encanto Original Motion Picture Soundtrack	check		
2021	"Dos Oruguitas"	Various	Encanto Original Motion Picture Soundtrack	check		
2021	"All Of You"	Various	Encanto Original Motion Picture Soundtrack	check		
2021	"Break My Baby"	KALEO	Surface Sounds	check		
2021	"Repeat"	Grace VanderWaal	Repeat	check	check	
2021	"Good Day"	Twenty One Pilots	Scaled and Icy	check		
2021	"Mulberry Street"	Twenty One Pilots	Scaled and Icy	check		
2021	"Hypotheticals"	Lake Street Dive	Obviously	check		
2021	"Hush Money"	Lake Street Dive	Obviously	check		
2021	"Same Old News"	Lake Street Dive	Obviously	check		
2021	"Being A Woman"	Lake Street Dive	Obviously	check		
2021	"Making Do"	Lake Street Dive	Obviously	check		
2021	"Nobody's Stopping You Now"	Lake Street Dive	Obviously	check		
2021	"Know That I Know"	Lake Street Dive	Obviously	check		
2021	"Lackluster Lover"	Lake Street Dive	Obviously	check		
2021	"Anymore"	Lake Street Dive	Obviously	check		
2021	"Feels Like The Last Time"	Lake Street Dive	Obviously	check		
2021	"Sarah"	Lake Street Dive	Obviously	check		
2021	"Fireflies"	Rag'n'Bone Man	Life by Misadventure	check		
2021	"Breath In Me"	Rag'n'Bone Man	Life by Misadventure	check		
2021	"Fall In Love Again"	Rag'n'Bone Man	Life by Misadventure	check		
2021	"Talking To Myself"	Rag'n'Bone Man	Life by Misadventure	check		
2021	"Anywhere Away from Here"	Rag'n'Bone Man	Life by Misadventure	check		
2021	"Alone"	Rag'n'Bone Man	Life by Misadventure	check		
2021	"Crossfire"	Rag'n'Bone Man	Life by Misadventure	check		
2021	"All You Ever Wanted"	Rag'n'Bone Man	Life by Misadventure	check	check	
2021	"Changing Of The Guard"	Rag'n'Bone Man	Life by Misadventure	check		
2021	"Somewhere Along The Way"	Rag'n'Bone Man	Life by Misadventure	check		
2021	"Time Will Only Tell"	Rag'n'Bone Man	Life by Misadventure	check		
2021	"Light Years"	Rag'n'Bone Man	Life by Misadventure	check		
2021	"Party's Over"	Rag'n'Bone Man	Life by Misadventure	check		
2021	"In The Heights"	Various	In the Heights Original Motion Picture Soundtrack	check		
2021	"96,000"	Various	In the Heights Original Motion Picture Soundtrack	check		
2021	"Mystery"	Turnstile	Glow On	check		
2021	"Blackout"	Turnstile	Glow On	check		
2021	"Don't Play"	Turnstile	Glow On	check		
2021	"Underwater Boi"	Turnstile	Glow On	check		
2021	"Holiday"	Turnstile	Glow On	check		
2021	"Humanoid / Shake It Up"	Turnstile	Glow On	check		
2021	"Endless"	Turnstile	Glow On	check		
2021	"Fly Again"	Turnstile	Glow On	check		
2021	"Alien Love Call (feat. Blood Orange)"	Turnstile	Glow On	check		
2021	"Wild Wrld"	Turnstile	Glow On	check		
2021	"Dance Off"	Turnstile	Glow On	check		
2021	"New Heart Design"	Turnstile	Glow On	check		
2021	"T.L.C."	Turnstile	Glow On	check		
2021	"No Surprise"	Turnstile	Glow On	check		
2021	"Lonely Dezires (feat. Blood Orange)"	Turnstile	Glow On	check		
2021	"All Depends On You"	Explorer Tapes	Explorer Tapes	check		
2021	"Texas Time"	Explorer Tapes	Explorer Tapes	check		
2021	"A Good Friend Is Hard To Find"	Explorer Tapes	Explorer Tapes	check		
2021	"Julia"	Explorer Tapes	Explorer Tapes	check		
2021	"Kids These Days"	Explorer Tapes	Explorer Tapes	check		
2021	"Washed Away"	Explorer Tapes	Explorer Tapes	check		
2021	"Change Looks Good On You"	Explorer Tapes	Explorer Tapes	check		
2021	"Radio"	Explorer Tapes	Explorer Tapes	check		
2021	"Everybody's Crazy"	Explorer Tapes	Explorer Tapes	check		
2021	"More Than A Love Song Can Say"	Explorer Tapes	Explorer Tapes	check		
2021	"Easy To Love"	Explorer Tapes	Explorer Tapes	check		
2021	"Wouldn't Change A Thing"	Explorer Tapes	Explorer Tapes	check		
2021	"Sunset Strip"	Explorer Tapes	Explorer Tapes	check		
2021	"Still Love Lindsay"	Explorer Tapes	Explorer Tapes	check		
2021	"Break My Heart Myself"	Bebe Rexha	Better Mistakes	check		
2021	"Taking The Heat"	Joy Oladokun	In Defense Of My Own Happiness	check	check	
2021	"Mercy"	Jonas Brothers	Space Jam: A New Legacy Original Motion Picture Soundtrack	check	check	
2020	"Modern Loneliness"	Lauv	How I'm Feeling	check	check	
2020	"A Commotion"	Mastodon	Medium Rarities	check		
2020	"A Spoonful Weighs A Ton"	Mastodon	Medium Rarities	check		
2020	"St. James"	Avenged Sevenfold	Diamonds In The Rough	check		
2020	"Set Me Free"	Avenged Sevenfold	Diamonds In The Rough	check		
2020	"4:00 AM"	Avenged Sevenfold	Diamonds In The Rough	check		
2020	"Lost It All"	Avenged Sevenfold	Diamonds In The Rough	check		
2019	"Not Like Us"	Brantley Gilbert	Fire & Brimstone	check		
2019	"Welcome To Hazeville"	Brantley Gilbert	Fire & Brimstone	check		
2019	"She Ain't Home"	Brantley Gilbert	Fire & Brimstone	check		
2019	"Lost Soul's Prayer"	Brantley Gilbert	Fire & Brimstone	check		
2019	"Breaks Down"	Brantley Gilbert	Fire & Brimstone	check		
2019	"Love Her"	Jonas Brothers	Happiness Begins	check	check	
2019	"Are You In Love? (Intro)"	The Regrettes	How Do You Love?	check	check	
2019	"California Friends"	The Regrettes	How Do You Love?	check		
2019	"I Dare You"	The Regrettes	How Do You Love?	check	check	
2019	"Coloring Book"	The Regrettes	How Do You Love?	check		
2019	"Fog"	The Regrettes	How Do You Love?	check	check	
2019	"Pumpkin"	The Regrettes	How Do You Love?	check		
2019	"Stop And Go"	The Regrettes	How Do You Love?	check		
2019	"Dress Up"	The Regrettes	How Do You Love?	check	check	
2019	"Dead Wrong"	The Regrettes	How Do You Love?	check		
2019	"More Than A Month"	The Regrettes	How Do You Love?	check		
2019	"Go Love You"	The Regrettes	How Do You Love?	check	check	
2019	"Here You Go"	The Regrettes	How Do You Love?	check	check	
2019	"The Game"	The Regrettes	How Do You Love?	check		
2019	"Has It Hit You?"	The Regrettes	How Do You Love?	check	check	
2019	"How Do You Love?"	The Regrettes	How Do You Love?	check		
2019	"Kid I Used To Know"	Tori Kelly	Inspired by True Events	check	check	
2019	"Pretty Fades"	Tori Kelly	Inspired by True Events	check		
2018	"Come Through"	The Regrettes	Attention Seeker	check	check	
2018	"Red Light"	The Regrettes	Attention Seeker	check		
2018	"A Teenager In Love"	The Regrettes	Attention Seeker	check		
2018	"Hey Now (Acoustic)"	The Regrettes	Attention Seeker	check		
2018	"A Living Human Girl (Acoustic)"	The Regrettes	Attention Seeker	check		
2018	"Texas Time"	Keith Urban	Graffiti U	check		
2018	"Blockades"	Muse	Simulation Theory	check		
2018	"Dig Down"	Muse	Simulation Theory	check		
2018	"Valentine"	5 Seconds of Summer	Youngblood	check	check	
2017	"Come Together"	Gary Clark Jr. & Junkie XL	Justice League Original Motion Picture Soundtrack	check		
2017	"High Enough"	K.Flay	Every Where Is Some Where	check	check	
2017	"Mean It"	K.Flay	Every Where Is Some Where	check		
2017	"No Data"	Daye Jack	No Data	check	check	
2017	"Finish Line"	Daye Jack	No Data	check	check	
2017	"Data Love Interlude"	Daye Jack	No Data	check	check	
2017	"Lady Villain"	Daye Jack	No Data	check	check	
2017	"Bully Bully"	Daye Jack	No Data	check		
2017	"Raw"	Daye Jack	No Data	check	check	
2017	"Need Some Mo' Interlude"	Daye Jack	No Data	check	check	
2017	"Casino"	Daye Jack	No Data	check	check	
2017	"Kick - Door"	Daye Jack	No Data	check	check	
2017	"No Data Outro"	Daye Jack	No Data	check	check	
2017	"Lie"	NF	Perception		check	
2017	"Superficial Love"	Ruth B	Safe Haven	check		
2017	"Headphones"	Walk the Moon	What If Nothing	check		
2017	"All Night"	Walk the Moon	What If Nothing	check		
2017	"Kamikaze"	Walk the Moon	What If Nothing	check		
2017	"Feels Good To Be High"	Walk the Moon	What If Nothing	check		
2017	"In My Mind"	Walk the Moon	What If Nothing	check		
2017	"Galway Girl"	Ed Sheeran	÷	check		
2017	"I Don't Like You"	The Regrettes	Feel Your Feelings Fool!	check		
2017	"A Living Human Girl"	The Regrettes	Feel Your Feelings Fool!	check		
2017	"Hey Now"	The Regrettes	Feel Your Feelings Fool!	check		
2017	"Hot"	The Regrettes	Feel Your Feelings Fool!	check		
2017	"Seashore"	The Regrettes	Feel Your Feelings Fool!	check		
2017	"Juicebox Baby"	The Regrettes	Feel Your Feelings Fool!	check		
2017	"'Til Tomorrow"	The Regrettes	Feel Your Feelings Fool!	check		
2017	"Play Skin"	The Regrettes	Feel Your Feelings Fool!	check		
2017	"Lacy Loo"	The Regrettes	Feel Your Feelings Fool!	check		
2017	"Head In The Clouds"	The Regrettes	Feel Your Feelings Fool!	check		
2017	"How It Should Be"	The Regrettes	Feel Your Feelings Fool!	check		
2017	"Picture Perfect"	The Regrettes	Feel Your Feelings Fool!	check		
2017	"Bronze"	The Regrettes	Feel Your Feelings Fool!	check		
2017	"Ladylike / WHATTA BITCH"	The Regrettes	Feel Your Feelings Fool!	check		
2017	"You Won't Do"	The Regrettes	Feel Your Feelings Fool!	check		
2017	"Cold"	The Regrettes	Feel Your Feelings Fool!	check		
2016	"Paradise"	Phases	Afterparty	check		
2016	"Tell Me"	Phases	Afterparty	check	check	
2016	"Go Forever"	Phases	Afterparty	check		
2016	"She Won't Look Back"	Anthony Wilson	Frogtown	check		
2016	"Frogtown"	Anthony Wilson	Frogtown	check		
2016	"Your Footprints"	Anthony Wilson	Frogtown	check		
2016	"Occhi Di Bambola"	Anthony Wilson	Frogtown	check		
2016	"Silver And Flint"	Anthony Wilson	Frogtown	check		
2016	"Our Affair"	Anthony Wilson	Frogtown	check		
2016	"The Case Of A Family Man"	Anthony Wilson	Frogtown	check		
2016	"Mopeds"	Anthony Wilson	Frogtown	check		
2016	"Arcadia"	Anthony Wilson	Frogtown	check		
2016	"The Geranium"	Anthony Wilson	Frogtown	check		
2016	"Shabby Bird"	Anthony Wilson	Frogtown	check		
2016	"I Saw It Through The Skylight"	Anthony Wilson	Frogtown	check		
2016	"Downtown Abbey"	Anthony Wilson	Frogtown	check		
2016	"Heathens"	Twenty One Pilots	Suicide Squad: The Album	check		
2016	"I Can't Stand You Anymore"	Sleigh Bells	Jessica Rabbit	check	check	
2016	"Baptism By Fire"	Sleigh Bells	Jessica Rabbit	check	check	
2016	"Jump"	Skylar Grey	Natural Causes	check	check	
2016	"Kill For You"	Skylar Grey	Natural Causes	check	check	
2016	"In My Garden"	Skylar Grey	Natural Causes	check	check	
2016	"Moving Mountains"	Skylar Grey	Natural Causes	check	check	
2016	"My Shot (Rise Up Remix (The Roots, Busta Rhymes, Joell Otiz & Nate Reuss))"	Various	The Hamilton Mixtape	check		
2016	"Satisfied (Sia, Miguel & Queen Latifah)"	Various	The Hamilton Mixtape	check		
2016	"Burn (Andra Day)"	Various	The Hamilton Mixtape	check		
2016	"Keep It Simple (feat. Stormzy)"	Raleigh Richie	You're a Man Now, Boy	check	check	
2015	"Stressed Out"	Twenty One Pilots	Blurryface	check		
2015	"Polarize"	Twenty One Pilots	Blurryface	check		
2015	"Hometown"	Twenty One Pilots	Blurryface	check	check	
2015	"Not Today"	Twenty One Pilots	Blurryface	check		
2015	"Silhouette"	Phases	For Life	check		
2015	"Betty Blue"	Phases	For Life	check	check	
2015	"I'm In Love With My Life"	Phases	For Life	check		
2015	"Spark"	Phases	For Life	check		
2015	"Cooler"	Phases	For Life	check		
2015	"Vertigo"	Phases	For Life	check	check	
2015	"Part Of Me"	Phases	For Life	check	check	
2015	"Running Away"	Phases	For Life	check		
2015	"New Illusion"	Phases	For Life	check	check	
2015	"I Don't Know What's Right"	Phases	For Life	check		
2015	"Lonely Nights"	Phases	For Life	check		
2015	"Take Me There"	Phases	For Life	check	check	
2015	"Chaser"	Carrie Underwood	Storyteller		check	
2013	"Good Thing"	Keith Urban	Fuse	check	check	
2013	"Red Camaro"	Keith Urban	Fuse	check	check	
2013	"Shepherd of Fire"	Avenged Sevenfold	Hail to the King	check		
2013	"Hail to the King"	Avenged Sevenfold	Hail to the King	check		
2013	"Doing Time"	Avenged Sevenfold	Hail to the King	check		
2013	"This Means War"	Avenged Sevenfold	Hail to the King	check		
2013	"Requiem"	Avenged Sevenfold	Hail to the King	check		
2013	"Crimson Day"	Avenged Sevenfold	Hail to the King	check		
2013	"Heretic"	Avenged Sevenfold	Hail to the King	check		
2013	"Coming Home"	Avenged Sevenfold	Hail to the King	check		
2013	"Planets"	Avenged Sevenfold	Hail to the King	check		
2013	"Acid Rain"	Avenged Sevenfold	Hail to the King	check		
2013	"Come Together"	Echosmith	Talking Dreams	check		
2013	"Let's Love"	Echosmith	Talking Dreams	check		
2013	"Cool Kids"	Echosmith	Talking Dreams	check		
2013	"March Into The Sun"	Echosmith	Talking Dreams	check		
2013	"Come With Me"	Echosmith	Talking Dreams	check		
2013	"Bright"	Echosmith	Talking Dreams	check		
2013	"Talking Dreams"	Echosmith	Talking Dreams	check		
2013	"Tell Her You Love Her"	Echosmith	Talking Dreams	check		
2013	"Ran Off In The Night"	Echosmith	Talking Dreams	check		
2013	"Nothing's Wrong"	Echosmith	Talking Dreams	check		
2013	"Safest Place"	Echosmith	Talking Dreams	check		
2013	"Surround You"	Echosmith	Talking Dreams	check		
2012	"Ain't Messin' Around"	Gary Clark Jr.	Blak and Blu	check		
2012	"When My Train Pulls In"	Gary Clark Jr.	Blak and Blu	check		
2012	"Blak And Blu"	Gary Clark Jr.	Blak and Blu	check		
2012	"Travis Country"	Gary Clark Jr.	Blak and Blu	check		
2012	"The Life"	Gary Clark Jr.	Blak and Blu	check		
2012	"Glitter Ain't Gold (Jumpin' For Nothin')"	Gary Clark Jr.	Blak and Blu	check	check	
2012	"Numb"	Gary Clark Jr.	Blak and Blu	check		
2012	"Please Come Home"	Gary Clark Jr.	Blak and Blu	check		
2012	"Third Stone From The Sun / If You Love Me Like You Say"	Gary Clark Jr.	Blak and Blu	check		
2012	"You Saved Me"	Gary Clark Jr.	Blak and Blu	check		
2012	"Next Door Neighbor Blues"	Gary Clark Jr.	Blak and Blu	check		
2012	"Breakdown"	Gary Clark Jr.	Blak and Blu	check		
2012	"Soul"	Gary Clark Jr.	Blak and Blu	check		
2012	"Talk Is Cheap"	Eric Hutchinson	Moving Up Living Down	check	check	
2012	"Best Days"	Eric Hutchinson	Moving Up Living Down	check		
2012	"The Basement"	Eric Hutchinson	Moving Up Living Down	check		
2012	"Watching You Watch Him"	Eric Hutchinson	Moving Up Living Down	check		
2012	"Breakdown More"	Eric Hutchinson	Moving Up Living Down	check		
2012	"In The First Place"	Eric Hutchinson	Moving Up Living Down	check		
2012	"I'm Not Cool"	Eric Hutchinson	Moving Up Living Down	check		
2012	"Small Town Moon"	Regina Spektor	What We Saw from the Cheap Seats	check		
2012	"Oh Marcello"	Regina Spektor	What We Saw from the Cheap Seats	check		
2012	"Don't Leave Me (Ne Me Quitte Pas)"	Regina Spektor	What We Saw from the Cheap Seats	check		
2012	"Firewood"	Regina Spektor	What We Saw from the Cheap Seats	check		
2012	"Patron Saint"	Regina Spektor	What We Saw from the Cheap Seats	check		
2012	"How"	Regina Spektor	What We Saw from the Cheap Seats	check		
2012	"All the Rowboats"	Regina Spektor	What We Saw from the Cheap Seats	check		
2012	"Ballad Of A Politician"	Regina Spektor	What We Saw from the Cheap Seats	check		
2012	"Open"	Regina Spektor	What We Saw from the Cheap Seats	check		
2012	"The Party"	Regina Spektor	What We Saw from the Cheap Seats	check		
2012	"Jessica"	Regina Spektor	What We Saw from the Cheap Seats	check		
2011	"Black Tongue"	Mastodon	The Hunter	check		
2011	"Curl of the Burl"	Mastodon	The Hunter	check		
2011	"Blasteroid"	Mastodon	The Hunter	check		
2011	"Stargasm"	Mastodon	The Hunter	check		
2011	"Octopus Has No Friends"	Mastodon	The Hunter	check		
2011	"All The Heavy Lifting"	Mastodon	The Hunter	check		
2011	"The Hunter"	Mastodon	The Hunter	check		
2011	"Dry Bone Valley"	Mastodon	The Hunter	check		
2011	"Thickening"	Mastodon	The Hunter	check		
2011	"Creature Lives"	Mastodon	The Hunter	check		
2011	"Spectrelight"	Mastodon	The Hunter	check		
2011	"Bedazzled Fingernails"	Mastodon	The Hunter	check		
2011	"The Sparrow"	Mastodon	The Hunter	check		
2011	"Where I Belong"	Switchfoot	Vice Verses		check	
2011	"Something In The Way You Are"	Kimbra	Vows	check	check	
2010	"Young Girl"	Eli "Paperboy" Reed	Come And Get It	check		
2010	"Name Calling"	Eli "Paperboy" Reed	Come And Get It	check		
2010	"Help Me"	Eli "Paperboy" Reed	Come And Get It	check		
2010	"Just Like Me"	Eli "Paperboy" Reed	Come And Get It	check		
2010	"Come And Get It"	Eli "Paperboy" Reed	Come And Get It	check		
2010	"Pick A Number"	Eli "Paperboy" Reed	Come And Get It	check		
2010	"I Found You Out"	Eli "Paperboy" Reed	Come And Get It	check		
2010	"Tell Me What I Hear"	Eli "Paperboy" Reed	Come And Get It	check		
2010	"Time Will Tell"	Eli "Paperboy" Reed	Come And Get It	check		
2010	"You Can Run On"	Eli "Paperboy" Reed	Come And Get It	check		
2010	"Pick Your Battles"	Eli "Paperboy" Reed	Come And Get It	check		
2010	"Explosion"	Eli "Paperboy" Reed	Come And Get It	check		
2010	"Nightmare"	Avenged Sevenfold	Nightmare	check		
2010	"Welcome to the Family"	Avenged Sevenfold	Nightmare	check		
2010	"Danger Line"	Avenged Sevenfold	Nightmare	check		
2010	"Buried Alive"	Avenged Sevenfold	Nightmare	check		
2010	"Natural Born Killer"	Avenged Sevenfold	Nightmare	check		
2010	"So Far Away"	Avenged Sevenfold	Nightmare	check		
2010	"God Hates Us"	Avenged Sevenfold	Nightmare	check		
2010	"Victim"	Avenged Sevenfold	Nightmare	check		
2010	"Tonight The World Dies"	Avenged Sevenfold	Nightmare	check		
2010	"Fiction"	Avenged Sevenfold	Nightmare	check		
2010	"Save Me"	Avenged Sevenfold	Nightmare	check		
2009	"Love Sex Magic"	Ciara	Fantasy Ride		check	
2009	"The Calculation"	Regina Spektor	Far	check		
2009	"Eet"	Regina Spektor	Far	check		
2009	"Machine"	Regina Spektor	Far	check		
2009	"Man Of A Thousand Faces"	Regina Spektor	Far	check		
2009	"Time Is All Around"	Regina Spektor	Far	check		
2009	"Mess of Me"	Switchfoot	Hello Hurricane	check		
2009	"Your Love Is a Song"	Switchfoot	Hello Hurricane	check	check	
2009	"The Sound (John M. Perkins' Blues)"	Switchfoot	Hello Hurricane	check		
2009	"Bullet Soul"	Switchfoot	Hello Hurricane	check		
2009	"Oh My"	Gin Wigmore	Holy Smoke	check		
2009	"Hey Ho"	Gin Wigmore	Holy Smoke	check		
2009	"New Revolution"	Gin Wigmore	Holy Smoke	check	check	
2009	"Don't Stop"	Gin Wigmore	Holy Smoke	check	check	
2009	"I Do"	Gin Wigmore	Holy Smoke	check		
2009	"Too Late For Lovers"	Gin Wigmore	Holy Smoke	check	check	
2009	"Mr Freakshow"	Gin Wigmore	Holy Smoke	check	check	
2009	"One Last Look"	Gin Wigmore	Holy Smoke	check	check	
2009	"Golden Ship"	Gin Wigmore	Holy Smoke	check		
2009	"Dying Day"	Gin Wigmore	Holy Smoke	check		
2009	"Cowboy Casanova"	Carrie Underwood	Play On		check	
2009	"Buffalo Bill"	Eminem	Relapse		check	
2008	"Peace Be Upon Us"	Sheryl Crow	Detours		check	
2008	"Love Is All There Is"	Sheryl Crow	Detours		check	
2008	"Don't Let Me Fall"	Lenka	Lenka	check		
2008	"Dangerous And Sweet"	Lenka	Lenka	check		
2008	"Trouble Is a Friend"	Lenka	Lenka	check		
2008	"We Will Not Grow Old"	Lenka	Lenka	check		
2008	"Force Of Nature"	Lenka	Lenka	check		
2008	"Who Knows"	Natasha Bedingfield	N.B.	check	check	
2008	"Say It Again"	Natasha Bedingfield	N.B.	check	check	
2008	"(No More) What If's (feat. Eve)"	Natasha Bedingfield	N.B.	check		
2007	"If I Never See Your Face Again"	Maroon 5	It Won't Be Soon Before Long	check		
2007	"Wake Up Call"	Maroon 5	It Won't Be Soon Before Long	check		
2007	"Won't Go Home Without You"	Maroon 5	It Won't Be Soon Before Long	check		
2007	"Nothing Lasts Forever"	Maroon 5	It Won't Be Soon Before Long	check		
2007	"Goodnight Goodnight"	Maroon 5	It Won't Be Soon Before Long	check		
2007	"Not Falling Apart"	Maroon 5	It Won't Be Soon Before Long	check		
2007	"Kiwi"	Maroon 5	It Won't Be Soon Before Long	check		
2007	"Better That We Break"	Maroon 5	It Won't Be Soon Before Long	check		
2007	"Under The Blacklight"	Rilo Kiley	Under the Blacklight	check		
2007	"Dejalo"	Rilo Kiley	Under the Blacklight	check		
2007	"15"	Rilo Kiley	Under the Blacklight	check		
2007	"Smoke Detector"	Rilo Kiley	Under the Blacklight	check		
2007	"The Angels Hung Around"	Rilo Kiley	Under the Blacklight	check		
2007	"Give A Little Love"	Rilo Kiley	Under the Blacklight	check		
2006	"Hustlers"	Nas	Hip Hop Is Dead		check	
2006	"I Got Money Now"	Pink (singer)	I'm Not Dead	check	check	
2006	"Don't Approach Me"	Xzibit	Restless		check	
2006	"Cocaina"	Busta Rhymes	The Big Bang		check	
2006	"Wunderkind"	Alanis Morissette	The Chronicles of Narnia: The Lion, the Witch and the Wardrobe (Soundtrack)	check		
2006	"Go To Mexico"	Cassandra Wilson	Thunderbird		check	
2006	"It Would Be So Easy"	Cassandra Wilson	Thunderbird		check	
2005	"Piece Of My Heart"	Eric Clapton	Back Home		check	
2005	"Get Him Back"	Fiona Apple	Extraordinary Machine	check		
2005	"O' Sailor"	Fiona Apple	Extraordinary Machine	check		
2005	"Better Version of Me"	Fiona Apple	Extraordinary Machine	check		
2005	"Tymps (The Sick in the Head Song)"	Fiona Apple	Extraordinary Machine	check		
2005	"Parting Gift"	Fiona Apple	Extraordinary Machine	check		
2005	"Window"	Fiona Apple	Extraordinary Machine	check		
2005	"Oh Well"	Fiona Apple	Extraordinary Machine	check		
2005	"Please, Please, Please"	Fiona Apple	Extraordinary Machine	check		
2005	"Red, Red, Red"	Fiona Apple	Extraordinary Machine	check		
2005	"Not About Love"	Fiona Apple	Extraordinary Machine	check		
2005	"Talk About Me"	50 Cent	Get Rich or Die Tryin' (Music From and Inspired By the Motion Picture)	check	check	
2005	"When It Rains It Pours"	50 Cent	Get Rich or Die Tryin' (Music From and Inspired By the Motion Picture)	check	check	
2005	"Westside Story"	The Game	The Documentary		check	
2005	"Higher"	The Game	The Documentary		check	
2005	"How We Do"	The Game	The Documentary	check	check	
2005	"Don't Worry"	The Game	The Documentary	check	check	
2005	"Outta Control"	50 Cent	The Massacre	check	check	
2005	"Guns Come Out"	50 Cent	The Massacre	check	check	
2004	"U R The One"	D12	D12 World		check	
2004	"American Psycho II"	D12	D12 World	check	check	
2004	"Evil Deeds"	Eminem	Encore		check	
2004	"Never Enough"	Eminem	Encore	check	check	
2004	"Mosh"	Eminem	Encore	check	check	
2004	"Rain Man"	Eminem	Encore		check	
2004	"Big Weenie"	Eminem	Encore		check	
2004	"Just Lose It"	Eminem	Encore	check	check	
2004	"Ass Like That"	Eminem	Encore	check	check	
2004	"Encore (Curtains)"	Eminem	Encore		check	
2004	"Rich Girl"	Gwen Stefani	Love. Angel. Music. Baby.		check	
2003	"Poppin' Them Thangs"	G-Unit	Beg for Mercy		check	
2003	"G'd Up"	G-Unit	Beg for Mercy		check	
2003	"The Set Up"	Obie Trice	Cheers	check	check	
2003	"Shit Hits the Fan"	Obie Trice	Cheers	check	check	
2003	"Look In My Eyes	Obie Trice	Cheers	check	check	
2003	"Oh!"	Obie Trice	Cheers	check	check	
2003	"The Grass Is Green"	Nelly Furtado	Folklore	check	check	
2003	"Patiently Waiting"	50 Cent	Get Rich or Die Tryin'		check	
2003	"In Da Club"	50 Cent	Get Rich or Die Tryin'	check	check	
2003	"Heat"	50 Cent	Get Rich or Die Tryin'		check	
2003	"If I Can't"	50 Cent	Get Rich or Die Tryin'	check	check	
2003	"Back Down"	50 Cent	Get Rich or Die Tryin'		check	
2002	"Satisfaction"	Eve	Eve-Olution	check	check	
2002	"Business"	Eminem	The Eminem Show		check	
2002	"Say Goodbye To Hollywood"	Eminem	The Eminem Show		check	
2002	"Say What You Say"	Eminem	The Eminem Show		check	
2002	"Sally"	Bilal	1st Born Second		check	
2001	"Nasty Mind"	D12	Devil's Night		check	
2001	"Ain't Nuttin' But Music"	D12	Devil's Night		check	
2001	"Fight Music"	D12	Devil's Night		check	
2001	"Revelation"	D12	Devil's Night		check	
2001	"Family Affair"	Mary J. Blige	No More Drama		check	
2001	"Truck Volume"	Busta Rhymes	Genesis		check	
2001	"Break Ya Neck"	Busta Rhymes	Genesis		check	
2001	"Bounce (Let Me See Ya Throw It)"	Busta Rhymes	Genesis		check	
2001	"Holla"	Busta Rhymes	Genesis		check	
2001	"Let Me Blow Ya Mind (Feat. Gwen Stefani)"	Eve	Scorpion		check	
2000	"Haunted"	Poe	Haunted		check	
2000	"Terrible Thought"	Poe	Haunted		check	
2000	"Wild"	Poe	Haunted		check	
2000	"Not a Virgin Anymore"	Poe	Haunted		check	
2000	"Don't Approach Me" (feat. Eminem)	Xzibit	Restless		check	
2000	"Hennesey n Buddah"	Snoop Dogg	Tha Last Meal		check	
2000	"True Lies"	Snoop Dogg	Tha Last Meal	check	check	
2000	"Lay Low"	Snoop Dogg	Tha Last Meal	check	check	
2000	"Who Knew"	Eminem	The Marshall Mathers LP		check	
2000	"The Real Slim Shady"	Eminem	The Marshall Mathers LP		check	
2000	"I'm Back"	Eminem	The Marshall Mathers LP		check	
2000	"Bitch Please II"	Eminem	The Marshall Mathers LP		check	
