= Lydia Night =

American rock musician

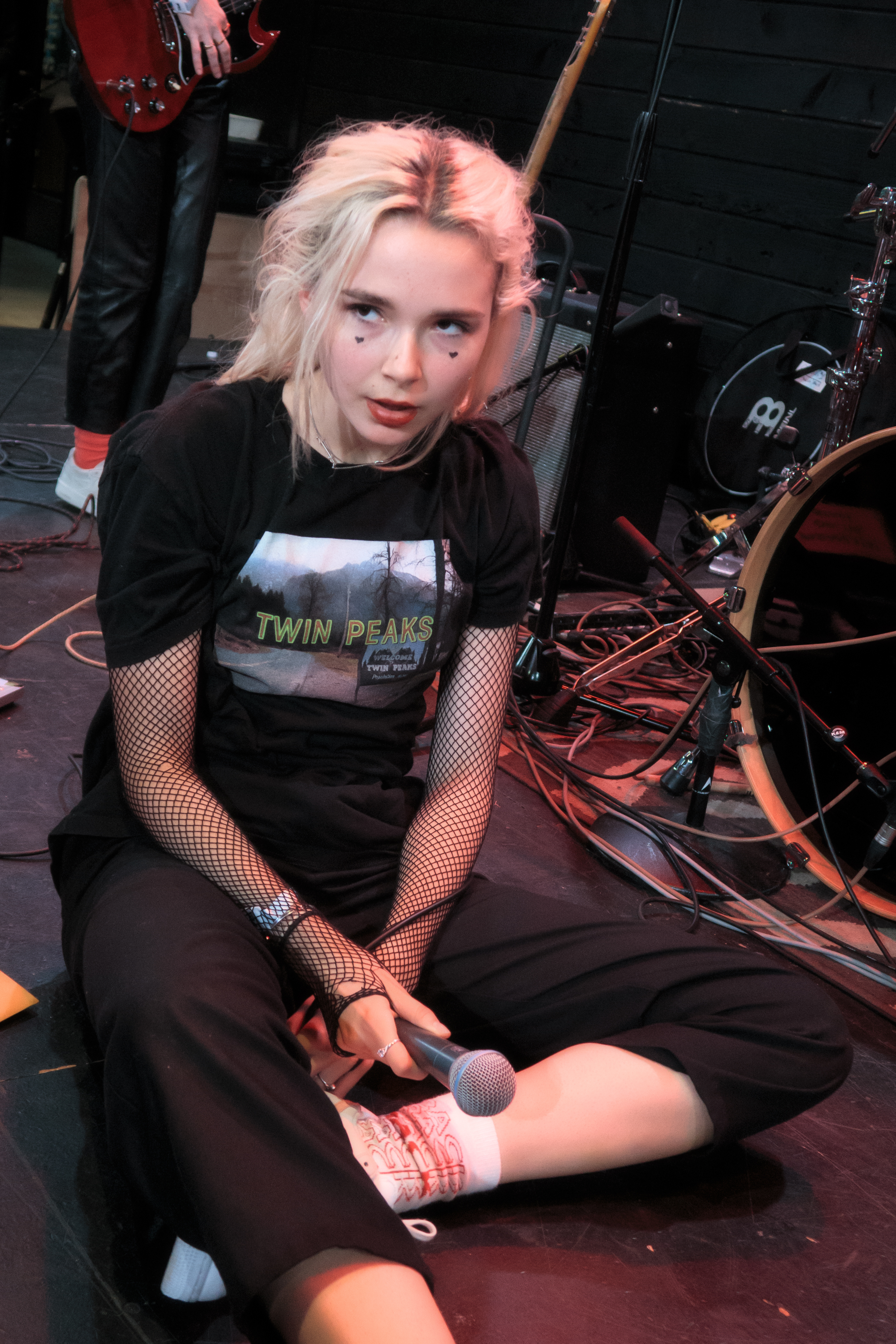
- Night in 2018

Background information
- Born: Lydia Victoria Night; October 13, 2000 (age 25)
- Origin: New Orleans, Louisiana, U.S.
- Genres: Punk rock; riot grrrl; pop rock; indie rock
- Occupation: Musician
- Instruments: Vocals, guitar
- Years active: 2007–present
- Formerly of: The Regrettes; Pretty Little Demons

Lydia Victoria Night (born October 13, 2000) is an American musician primarily known for her work as the lead vocalist and rhythm guitarist of California rock band the Regrettes. She was also the lead vocalist and guitarist of pop rock bands Pretty Little Demons and LILA as well as a frequent collaborator with rock duo Dead Man's Bones. In 2018, Robben Barquist of Collide Culture referred to Night as the new face of feminist punk.

== Biography ==
=== 2000–2011: Early life ===
Night is the daughter of Morgan Higby Night. She began performing live as young as two years old, singing the Ramones song "Beat on the Brat" for the soundcheck at her father's nightclub in New Orleans, where she was born. A few years later, she and her family relocated to Santa Monica, California, and soon after Los Angeles. When she was seven years old, she formed her first band LILA (which stood for Little Independent Loving Artists), who performed at school events and McCabe's guitar shop in Santa Monica.

=== 2012–2014: Pretty Little Demons and Dead Man's Bones ===
In 2012, she formed the pop rock group Pretty Little Demons with drummer Marlhy Murphy. In 2013, the duo played South by Southwest, becoming the youngest performers to play at the festival. This caught the attention of Ryan Gosling, who asked her to join his band Dead Man's Bones.

In 2013, Pretty Little Demons released their debut EP Flowers, followed by their album Unknown Species in 2014.

=== 2015–2023: The Regrettes ===
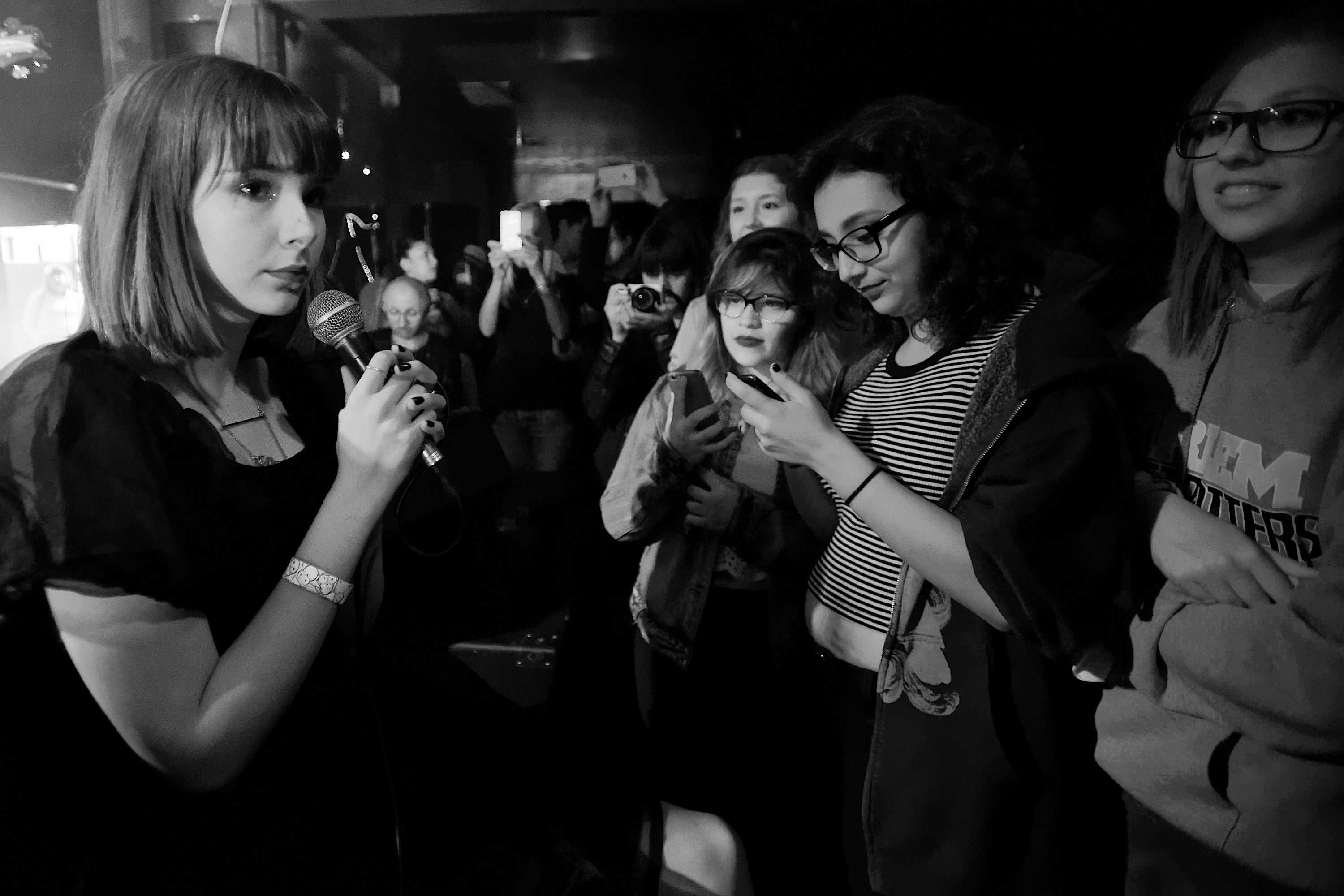
Night in 2016, performing at the Echo

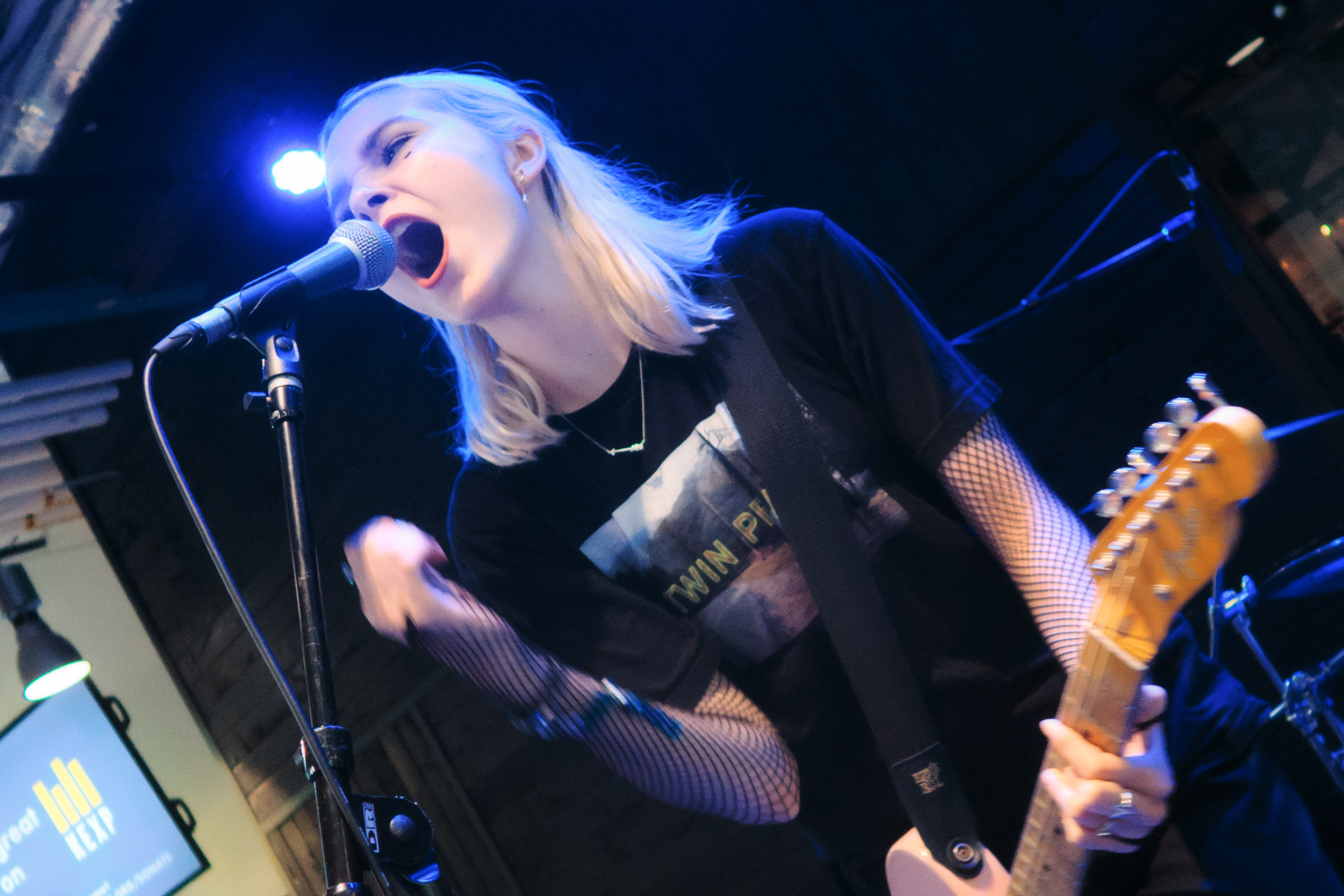
Lydia Night performing in September 2018

In 2015, the duo changed their name to the Regrettes, releasing their debut four-track EP in October, titled Hey!, accompanied by a music video for its track "Hey Now!". Murphy subsequently departed from the band, leading to the hiring of, then-Genessa members, Genessa Gariano, Sage Chavis and Maxx Morando.

Under this line-up, the band released their debut album Feel Your Feelings Fool! on January 13, 2017, and its follow up, the 2018 EP Attention Seeker.

On December 13, 2018, she featured on Gerard Way's Christmas song "Dasher".

On April 8, 2019, she was featured on Morrissey's cover of "Wedding Bell Blues", also with Billie Joe Armstrong.

On June 18, 2019, the band announced their second studio album, How Do You Love?, would be released on August 9.

On December 18, 2023, the band announced that they were breaking up via their official Instagram account. They played three farewell shows in LA.

=== 2025: Pop or Flop ===
Night launched a YouTube vlog called "Pop or Flop" in January 2025, documenting her journey to being a "Pop Star". She released "Pity Party", her first single, on April 4, 2025 on her YouTube channel.

== Influences ==
Night has cited influences from artists including the Crystals, Lesley Gore, Patsy Cline, Bikini Kill, L7, 7 Year Bitch, the Marvelettes, Diana Ross and Four Tops.

== Personal life ==
In 2014, Night began attending Grand Arts High School, a performing arts high school in Downtown Los Angeles.

In 2018, she began dating actor and Wallows singer Dylan Minnette. In 2022, she announced via her Instagram account that the two had ended their relationship.

On July 20, 2020, she alleged on her Instagram that Joey Armstrong of the band SWMRS sexually abused her during their relationship in 2017 when she was 16 and he was 22.

Night is bisexual.

== Discography ==
=== Singles ===
- "Pity Party" (2025)
- "The Hearse" (2025)
- "Gutter" (2025)
- "The Bomb" (2025)
- "I WANNA BE A STAR" (2026)

=== Studio albums ===
- Parody of Pleasure (2025)

=== With Pretty Little Demons ===
Studio albums

- Unknown Species (2014)

EPs

- Flowers (2013)

=== With the Regrettes ===
Studio albums

- Feel Your Feelings Fool! (2017)
- How Do You Love? (2019)
- Further Joy (2022)

EPs

- Hey! EP (2015)
- Attention Seeker (2018)

=== As a featured artist ===
- Gerard Way – "Dasher" (2018)
- Morrissey – "Wedding Bell Blues" (2019)
- Wallows – "Permanent Price" (2022)
