= Mess of Me =

Single by Switchfoot

from the album Hello Hurricane
- Released: September 1, 2009
- Recorded: 2009
- Genre: Alternative rock, post-grunge, hard rock
- Length: 3:27
- Label: lowercase people/Atlantic
- Songwriters: Jon Foreman; Tim Foreman
- Producers: Switchfoot; Mike Elizondo; Rob Cavallo

Switchfoot singles chronology
"This Is Home" (2008)	"Mess of Me" (2009)	"Always" (2009)

"Mess of Me" is a song written and recorded by the alternative rock band Switchfoot and was the lead single from their seventh studio album, Hello Hurricane. It was shipped to Modern Rock/Alternative, Mainstream rock, and Active rock radio formats, while a music video was sent to all applicable outlets.

== Song history ==
The song was initially called "I Saw Satan Fall Like Lightning," a track Switchfoot demoed during pre-production sessions for Hello Hurricane with Charlie Peacock. It had a more funk feel and had a different sound, though the opening riff was preserved all the way until the final version of the song. This early demo version has since made its way onto the bonus disc, Building a Hurricane.

The song was first performed live at the Big Ticket Festival in Michigan on June 18, 2009, and has since become a regular in Switchfoot's live setlist throughout the 2009 summer festival touring season and beyond.

It was first hinted that the song was going to be the single when Jon Foreman introduced it before playing it live at Kings Fest in Virginia on July 10, 2009, saying "as far as I'm concerned," the song was to be the lead single. On July 13, it was confirmed on switchfoot.com.

Later, on August 5, Jon Foreman and Tim Foreman took the song to producer Rob Cavallo, "working just a touch more" on it. The album track was mixed by Chris Lord-Alge.

Narrated in first person, the song describes the "mess" that imperfect people make of their lives, and a desire "spend the rest of my life alive" (as stated in the chorus). It describes how mistakes are constantly being made, and that the problems in one's life cannot be fixed by drugs or other material things but only oneself. It expresses a desire to improve and become a better person despite the shortfalls that are being made continually. It also implies a protest against society's obsession with the pharmaceutical industry, which according to Forman has become the new way to "attain never-ending, everlasting, abundant life."

The song's main riff and drums bring an overall more aggressive sound, much like their earlier heavier songs from other albums. It features distorted guitar riffs and heavy drums accompanying often-distorted vocals, with its bridge featuring a drum solo. The song is in the key of e minor.

== Release ==
While "Mess of Me" was scheduled to be released to radio on September 29, the single had already made its way onto rock radio stations throughout the country well in advance. It was first heard on Atlanta's 99X rock station.

On September 1, Switchfoot announced that they would be hiding copies of the new single around the world. The first copy was hidden at Moonlight Beach in San Diego, CA under a palm tree. The band asked fans to make copies of the disks they found, and hide those copies elsewhere. Fans were also encouraged to hide the single online as well. The single has since spread from coast to coast and overseas.

Later, the single was officially released and impacted to radio stations on September 29, and a purchasable digital download of the song was made available the same day on all the major digital outlets. It went on to become their highest-charting song on the Billboard Modern Rock charts since "Dare You to Move" peaked at No. 9 in 2004. The song remained on the charts for 21 weeks before falling off.

On February 16, 2010, the music video debuted at No. 2 on Fuse TV's No. 1 Countdown in the Viewer's Choice category and No. 8 on the Alternative countdown the next day.

== Versions ==
The album was available in several versions/mixes.

- The first one, as released on the band's YouTube page and during the "Mess of Me" hunt, was mixed by Chris Lord-Alge and features a denser, fuller mix, with noticeable echoing of vocals and instrumentation in the pre-chorus and following the chorus. This was the mix that was sent to radio stations.
- The second version, as released on iTunes, features more prominent vocals and more prominent drums in the pre-chorus, specifically. This would go on to be the album cut.
- A third one, that comes with the iTunes preorder of Hello Hurricane, is an acoustic version of the song.

== Live performances ==
Switchfoot performed the song several times on late night television. The band performed the song on Jimmy Kimmel Live! November 12, The Tonight Show with Conan O'Brien on December 2, Late Night with Jimmy Fallon on January 20, and The Tonight Show with Jay Leno on March 17, 2010.

== Music videos ==
Switchfoot released the first music video for the song on September 9, 2009, to YouTube. It featured live footage taken from their summer Crazy Making Tour. Fans were actively encouraged to promote and spread the video, and it garnered several top honors on the site.

A second music video, the official version, features some of the same clips from the first cut, but had some newer, more refined shots and was more cinematic in nature. It was released to YouTube November 3, 2009. On February 2, Fuse TV added the video to their rotation and No. 1 Countdown voting list, with MTV2 adding it to their rotation on February 22.

== Charts ==
Chart (2009–10)	Peak position
Canada Rock (Billboard)	49
US Hot Christian Songs (Billboard)	30
US Hot Rock & Alternative Songs (Billboard)	22

== Awards ==
In 2010, the song was nominated for a Dove Award for Rock Recorded Song of the Year at the 41st GMA Dove Awards.
