= How Do You Love? (album) =

Studio album by The Regrettes
- Released: August 9, 2019
- Genres: Punk rock; riot grrrl
- Length: 44:43
- Label: Warner
- Producer: Mike Elizondo

The Regrettes chronology
Attention Seeker (2018)	How Do You Love? (2019)	Further Joy (2022)

Singles from How Do You Love?
- 1. "California Friends" Released: October 4, 2018; 2. "Pumpkin" Released: February 13, 2019; 3. "Dress Up" Released: May 2, 2019; 4. "I Dare You" Released: June 17, 2019

How Do You Love? is the second studio album by the American punk rock band The Regrettes, released on August 9, 2019, by Warner Records, as the follow-up to their previous album Feel Your Feelings Fool!. The album was produced by Mike Elizondo.

== Reception ==
Professional ratings
Aggregate scores
Source	Rating
AnyDecentMusic?	6.8/10
Metacritic	77/100
Review scores
Source	Rating
AllMusic	4/5 stars
Consequence of Sound	B+
Exclaim!	8/10
NME	3/5 stars
The Observer	2/5 stars
Paste	6.9/10

How Do You Love? was mostly met with positive reviews, and holds a score of 77/100 on Metacritic

== Track listing ==
No.	Title	Writer(s)	Length
1.	"Are You in Love? (Intro)"	Mike Elizondo; Lydia Night	0:56
2.	"California Friends"	Sage Chavis; Genessa Gariano; Maxx Morando; Night	3:34
3.	"I Dare You"	Julian Casablancas; Elizondo; Night	2:50
4.	"Coloring Book"	Gariano; Night	3:54
5.	"Fog"	Elizondo; Night	3:00
6.	"Pumpkin"	Night	3:27
7.	"Stop and Go"	Chavis; Night	2:59
8.	"Dress Up"	Elizondo; Night	2:50
9.	"Dead Wrong"	Chavis; Gariano; Morando; Night	3:25
10.	"More than a Month"	Night	3:43
11.	"Go Love You"	Elizondo; Gariano; Night	2:24
12.	"Here You Go"	Elizondo; Night; Robert James Smith	3:15
13.	"The Game"	Night	3:28
14.	"Has It Hit You?"	Elizondo; Gariano; Night	2:42
15.	"How Do You Love?"	Night	2:16
Total length:			44:43

== Personnel ==
=== The Regrettes ===
- Lydia Night - lead vocals, rhythm guitar
- Genessa Gariano - lead guitar, backing vocals
- Drew Thomsen - drums, percussion, backing vocals
- Brooke Dickson - bass guitar, backing vocals

=== Other personnel ===
- Brent Arrowood - engineer
- Mike Elizondo - production
- Adam Hawkins - engineer, mixing
- Alonzo Lazaro - engineer
- Henry Lunetta - editing
- Rachael Moore - assistant engineer
- Alex Tenta - art direction, design
