= Hello Hurricane =

2009 album by Switchfoot

Studio album by Switchfoot
- Released: November 10, 2009
- Recorded: 2007–2009
- Studios: Spot X Studio, San Diego, CA; Phantom Studios, Westlake Village, CA
- Genres: Alternative rock; art rock; post-rock; post-grunge; hard rock
- Length: 49:03
- Labels: lowercase people; Atlantic
- Producers: Mike Elizondo; Switchfoot

Switchfoot chronology
The Best Yet (2008)	Hello Hurricane (2009)	Eastern Hymns for Western Shores (2010)

Singles from Hello Hurricane
- 1. "Mess of Me" Released: September 29, 2009; 2. "Always" Released: October 28, 2009; 3. "The Sound (John M. Perkins' Blues)" Released: April 26, 2010; 4. "Your Love Is a Song" Released: June 29, 2010; 5. "Bullet Soul" Released: November 16, 2010

Hello Hurricane is the seventh studio album by American alternative rock band Switchfoot, released on November 10, 2009. It was co-produced by the band and Mike Elizondo, after initially self-producing their work, as well as test runs with producers such as Ken Andrews and Charlie Peacock. The album was recorded mainly in the band's Spot X Studio in their hometown of San Diego, California. It was originally to be released on October 6, 2009, but was pushed back to a November 10, 2009 release on their independent record label, the Atlantic-distributed lowercase people records. On February 13, 2011, the album won the award for Best Rock Gospel Album at the 53rd Grammy Awards.

== Recording and production ==
=== Recording sessions with Charlie Peacock ===
Pre-production for Hello Hurricane began during the first week of August 2007. That week, the band recorded 13 songs at Big Fish Studio under the guidance of producer Charlie Peacock, who was the founder of the band's first independent label, Re:Think Records. As an experiment, the band "set up all in one room" and tracked the songs live. These new song ideas were then indefinitely shelved when the band embarked on their fall Appetite for Construction Tour with Relient K, with drummer Chad Butler later calling the sessions a "failed experiment".

The band does credit Peacock with encouraging them throughout that time period, positing that the band was "reaching for a horizon that's much larger" than anything they'd done before. The band walked away from their time with Peacock determined to keep "pushing for something we hadn't felt yet...just that desire to go back in and keep writing and keep pushing and looking".

=== Major label independence ===
After the Peacock sessions, the band revealed on August 9 that they had left their Major record label, Columbia/Sony BMG, and intended to independently release their follow-up to 2006's Oh! Gravity.

To usher in this new period of label independence, the band began construction of a recording studio in San Diego on October 12, 2007. Soon after, it was announced that they had founded an independent record label imprint called lowercase people records, under which proceeding projects, including the as-yet-untitled new studio album, would be released.

In May 2008, Switchfoot moved into their new studio which they called Spot X, and recording for the record was kicked into high gear in June, with the band proceeding without a producer. "I feel like we've got a fairly firm grip on what we want to do and I feel like we can get there on our own", Switchfoot singer Jon Foreman said at the time. Progress was halted briefly when the band embarked on the Music Builds Tour in August, but was resumed soon after.

=== Sessions resume with Mike Elizondo and Darrell Thorp ===
On October 30, it was revealed that Grammy Award-winning engineer Darrell Thorp, who has worked with the likes of Radiohead and Outkast, had been working with Switchfoot in the studio for the new record, and later, producer Mike Elizondo was brought on board for the last few months of recording.

Work on the record was once more halted in January 2009 when Foreman embarked on a national tour with Fiction Family, a side project band involving Sean Watkins of Nickel Creek. No further news was heard from Switchfoot again until late February, when the band announced they had finished selecting the final song list.

In March, the band tracked a few sessions with engineer Ryan Petersen and drummer Chad Butler reported they were "rounding 3rd base" on the album and that it was near completion.

Final mixing began on April 7, and later on, the band announced that during the sessions, they had actually been at work on 4 albums-worth of material. The album's title was announced on the 24th, and on May 30, Switchfoot sent out an email saying that "Hello Hurricane" was finished.

=== Rob Cavallo and Atlantic Records ===
After its completion, the album found its way into the hands of Rob Cavallo, newly appointed as Chief Creative Officer with Warner Music Group and Atlantic Records. Cavallo liked what he heard and contacted Switchfoot, eventually signing them on to a 360 Deal to distribute Hello Hurricane through Atlantic Records.

"We tracked the whole record completely on our own dime and basically just our own opinions what the record should be", said Jon Foreman. "And then Atlantic chased us down".

Shortly after signing on, the band held several sessions with Cavallo to rework some of the songs for radio.

== Musical and lyrical content ==
The album from the outset was described to be different from any previous work the band has done. "We wanted to start with a clean slate because the last couple of records felt kind of compromised", said Foreman concerning the period the band had with Columbia Records after 2003's The Beautiful Letdown. He describes the time period with their former label as one filled with personnel turnover, which eventually led to their departure from Sony because "we wanted to create an environment where we were going to be with the same people for a long time and trust is established."

During the early stages of production, Foreman said that the record was going to sound different sonically, initially "shaping up to be more acoustic AND more electronic". "You know, it’s one of those things where you get to a point where you kind of want to shock yourself again", said Foreman.

Later in August, Foreman said that "there are so many different directions we can go in. One of the songs has a (Led) Zeppelin feel. One of them has more of a Devo feel... I feel like the headspace we're in now, the glass ceiling's been shattered."

In January 2009, Foreman said that the sonic direction had been taken in three directions, with some songs being more "beat driven", some "punchy," and others "a little bit broader, ethereal," with the band ultimately deciding to go with an amalgam of the three elements.

The overall writing for the record was also varied, with shifts in style and production. Foreman attributes this to Thorp's input, crediting the engineer with creating a landscape in which "the darks are darker and the lights are brighter and the lows are lower and the highs are higher". The enlisting of Hip-hop/R&B producer Mike Elizondo late in the process brought a "new synergy" to the sessions, with drummer Chad Butler describing Elizondo as "someone who's got such a rhythmic sensibility".

With all the artistic freedom came increasingly large amounts of material in what bassist Tim Foreman calls "a very prolific season for us." The challenge for Switchfoot became a question of "how do you define yourself?" according to Butler. "You’ve got all these different songs and different styles and different musical experimentations. It becomes a big mess..." It quickly became clear that very few of the experimental tracks were going to make the record, with producer Elizondo telling the band to not "be afraid of what you've done for the past six records". In the end, the band decided to go in the direction of making "a statement" and defining who they are in an independent era, "and that’s when it came down to what are the songs saying and which ones mean the most to us."

Elizondo asked the band, "What are the songs that only you can bring? What are the songs that only Switchfoot can deliver?" And it was with that lens that the band chose the final track listing for Hello Hurricane. The inspiration for the album title comes from the story of a woman the band worked with during post-Hurricane Katrina who had lost her leg during the evacuation. "Her statement was, 'I walked out of my old house, I'm gonna walk into this new one,'" recalls Butler.

== Studio webcam and Twitter ==
As in the Oh! Gravity. sessions, the band installed a webcam in the studio to give fans a "fly-on-the-wall" view of their progress. Instead of the refresh-still-images camera that was utilized for the Gravity sessions, this version of the webcam featured real-time video streaming. It was launched for the first time on July 1, 2008, and was chronicled periodically on the fan-made Switchfoot Webcam Blog 2008.

Later, the band switched over to their Twitter account to update fans on the final stages of production for the album.

== Release ==
=== Promotion ===
The song "Hello Hurricane" was debuted at a May 8, 2009 concert in Visalia, California when the band played a preview of the album version of the song through the PA system for fans to hear. One fan recorded the song and posted it online, providing listeners with the first taste of the band's new material.

Switchfoot began unveiling the new material throughout the Summer Festival tour season, beginning with "Mess of Me", which was played live for the first time on June 18 at the Big Ticket Festival in Michigan. "Hello Hurricane", "Bullet Soul", "Needle and Haystack Life", and "The Sound (John M. Perkins' Blues)" were all debuted throughout the season as well.

Switchfoot also occasional listening parties across the United States to give fans a chance to hear the album in its entirety. Entrusting a master copy of the record to the YouTube online video content provider, Corey Vidal, fans got rare opportunities to hear Hello Hurricane during certain stops on Vidal's "Youtube Road Trip".

In September, Switchfoot released a music video for the lead single, "Mess of Me", to YouTube. The band also played a short string of radio shows to promote the upcoming record, debuting a stripped version of "Free" at a 99x radio session on September 9. The next day, Switchfoot performed "Always" at a show in the Ft. Lauderdale Culture Room in Florida.

Songs from "Hello Hurricane" were featured in 2009 College Football games on ESPN, with "Needle and Haystack Life", "The Sound", and "Bullet Soul" regularly playing before commercial breaks.

On October 16, before the American League Championship Series Game 1 broadcast, a montage of baseball highlights was shown interspersed with live clips of Switchfoot and the song "Free" playing in the background.

On November 3, 2009, the album was premiered in streaming format on the popular social networking site MySpace, giving fans a chance to listen to the new record a week before its release.

"Bullet Soul" was utilized as the theme song for WWE's "TLC: Tables, Ladders & Chairs" pay-per-view. and aired on ESPN broadcasts throughout the 2010 college football season along with "The Sound".

The band also played a string of late-night television shows after the album's release. They played "Mess of Me" on Jimmy Kimmel Live! November 12 and on The Tonight Show with Conan O'Brien on December 2. Switchfoot then opened 2010 by performing "Always" on The Late Late Show with Craig Ferguson on January 4, 2010. They also made appearances on Late Night with Jimmy Fallon and The Tonight Show with Jay Leno The band was also tapped as one of two acts (the other being The Goo Goo Dolls) to play the ESPN National Championship Tailgate at the Rose Bowl stadium before the BCS National Championship Game on January 7, 2010. Switchfoot continued to receive promotion for the album from the sports world, performing as the house band during the 2010 ESPY Awards pre-show. A few weeks later, they played a concert on the ESPN campus in Bristol, CT.

Hello Hurricane also has gotten some TV show airplay. One Tree Hill played "Your Love Is A Song" during the ending of the episode "You Know I Love You, Don't You", on November 30, 2009, and "Enough to Let Me Go" was played on "Every Picture Tells A Story", on April 26, 2010. "Always" was used for an episode of Grey's Anatomy titled "The Time Warp" on February 18, 2010. The song "Yet" appeared on an episode of The Vampire Diaries on November 5, 2009.

=== Distribution ===
Upon completion of Hello Hurricane, the band had concluded a season of independence and artistic freedom that hadn't been experienced since the band recorded The Beautiful Letdown independently. Once this season was concluded, the band began shopping around for a distribution label, "looking for the best partner to give these songs a large platform that is respectful to the people that listen to our music." On August 7, 2009, Switchfoot announced that their independently owned label, lowercase people records, would be partnering with Atlantic Records to distribute Hello Hurricane globally. EMI CMG would meanwhile retain the rights to release Switchfoot's material to the Christian market.

=== Formats ===
Hello Hurricane was distributed in several different formats and packages, as announced on switchfoot.com. Official pre-sales for the packages began on September 16, 2009.

- Digital Download
- Standard CD Edition
- Vinyl (with physical CD)
- Deluxe CD/DVD Edition
- Collector's Deluxe Edition (includes CD/DVD/Bonus disc, a hardbound 84-page photo book, an exclusive poster, and extra bonus content)

There is also an iTunes deluxe package available, with exclusive acoustic versions and other tracks.

== Critical reception ==
Professional ratings
Aggregate scores
Source	Rating
Metacritic	74/100
Review scores
Source	Rating
AbsolutePunk	77%
Allmusic	3.5/5 stars
Alternative Press	3.5/5 stars
American Music Channel	4/5 stars
Billboard	83/100
CCM Magazine	4.5/5 stars
The Christian Manifesto	4.2/5
Christian Music Zine	4/5 stars
Christianity Today	4/5 stars
Cross Rhythms	9/10 squares
Indie Vision Music	4/5 stars
Jesus Freak Hideout	4.5/5 stars
Louder Than the Music	4/5 stars
Melodic	3.5/5 stars
New Release Tuesday	5/5 stars 4.5/5 stars
Paste	7.4/10
The Phantom Tollbooth	4.5/5 stars 4/5 stars

Hello Hurricane garnered positive reviews by taking the twenty-one music critics ratings and reviews into account; however, Metacritic reports by utilizing just five music critics ratings and reviews that the album has a "weighted average" Metascore of a 74, which mean the album received "generally favorable reviews". At Christianity Today, Andrew Greer rated the album four stars, and comment that "Hello Hurricane's broad musical landscape supports a deep lyrical dig into the grief of the human heart and brazenly extends eternal hope for the soul." Andy Argyrakis of CCM Magazine rate the album four-and-a-half stars, and noted that "Switchfoot maintains its spiritual mindset, but never comes across as preachy in a secular environment, making Hello Hurricane the ultimate benchmark for any like-minded act, and amongst this band's very best." At Paste, Reid Davis rated the album a seven-point four, and called the album a "meat-and-potatoes arena rock polished to a gleaming sheen (thanks to producer Mike Elizondo), wrapped around huge hooks and intercut by Foreman’s incisive, discontented lyrics, which almost always manage to translate sentiments rooted deeply in faith to universally relatable choruses."

Mikael Wood of Billboard rated the album an eighty-three, and affirmed that it comes across as a "sleekly presented modern-rock album with no shortage of bruising guitars or catchy choruses." At Cross Rhythms, Haydon Spenceley rated the album nine out of ten squares, and stated that the album might ingrain the band a rock heavyweights because the release "maintain[s] their radio-ready edge whilst returning the band to the sphere of past glories and even, on occasions here, extending their musical and lyrical horizons." Pär Winberg of Melodic rated the album three-and-a-half stars, and wrote that the album was "just good modern rock with flirts from the past." At Alternative Press, Evan Lucy rated the album three-and-a-half stars, and evoked that the release was "An uplifting, hope-giving affirmation of resurgence from a band who might have been down at one point but were definitely never out." Relevant Magazine hailed it as "one of the best albums of Switchfoot’s career." In addition, Nigel Britto of The Times of India stated that "Hello Hurricane presents a renewed optimism and vigour and a lot more musical experimentation."

At AbsolutePunk, Gregory Robson rated the album a 77-percent, and cautioned that the album "ebbs and flows with potential and disappointment, promise and filler, which makes for an entirely frustrating listen." Andree Farias of Allmusic rated the album three-and-a-half stars, and called this the "most natural, effortless outing to date" because it was "almost devoid of surprises and offers exactly what the people want: an assemblage of straight-ahead rock anthems, free from left-of-center experiments, bouncy power-pop numbers, or obligatory balladry." At Jesus Freak Hideout, Jen Rose rated the album four-and-a-half stars, and commented that the album was "something uplifting, fun, and deep, and a great introduction" to the band on which was "A strong release from start to finish" that was "worth returning to again and again." Founder of Jesus Freak Hideout John DiBiase rated it four-and-a-half stars, and felt that the release "may not be the band's best project in their 12 year catalog of music, it's easily a highlight of their already impressive career."

At New Release Tuesday, Kevin Davis rated it a perfect five stars, and said it was one of the best albums of the year. Founder of New Release Tuesday Kevin McNeese rated the album a perfect five stars, and proclaimed that Switchfoot were "returning to the top of their game". Jonathan Francesco of New Release Tuesday rated it four-and-a-half, and affirmed that the release "really impressed". At Indie Vision Music, Michael Mayer III rated it four stars, and commented that the album was "the soundtrack for those storms everyone faces in their lives" on which "It sounds vast, full of life and hope, and every bit fitting to the theme it was created for." Gar Saegar of The Phantom Tollbooth rated it four-and-a-half stars, and alluded to how the album was "probably their strongest and most consistent record." The Phantom Tollbooth's Derek Walker rated it four stars, and commented that the album had "wider sonic palette" than The Beautiful Letdown but does not contain the "evenness" of it as well; however, the album "replaces it with a more mature, up-to-date and textured production, and a healthy dose of musical ambition."

At Louder Than the Music, Jono Davies rated the album four stars, and questioned that "Will this be counted as the best Switchfoot album? No. Is this the most complete album they have made? No. Does this album hit the spot? Maybe." Founder of Christian Music Zine Tyler Hess rated the album four stars, and felt that the album was "a further definition of who Switchfoot is as a band and what they do on their albums, thematically, musically and lyrically." At The Christian Manifesto, Thomas Jenkins rated it a four-point two, and noted how some aspects of the lyricism could have been improved that being said he called it "a great one". Emily J. Ramey of American Music Channel rated it four stars, and praised the album for being "steady and captivating."

== Commercial performance ==
Hello Hurricane debuted at number 13 on the Billboard 200, with first-week sales of 39,000 copies.

== Track listing ==
Hello Hurricane
No.	Title	Writer(s)	Length
1.	"Needle and Haystack Life"	Jon Foreman	3:46
2.	"Mess of Me"	Jon Foreman, Tim Foreman	3:28
3.	"Your Love Is a Song"	Jon Foreman, Mike Elizondo	4:19
4.	"The Sound (John M. Perkins' Blues)"	Jon Foreman, Tim Foreman	3:46
5.	"Enough to Let Me Go"	Jon Foreman, Tim Foreman	3:52
6.	"Free"	Jon Foreman	4:02
7.	"Hello Hurricane"	Jon Foreman, Tim Foreman	4:04
8.	"Always"	Jon Foreman	4:19
9.	"Bullet Soul"	Jon Foreman, Tim Foreman	3:24
10.	"Yet"	Jon Foreman, Tim Foreman	3:53
11.	"Sing It Out"	Jon Foreman, Tim Foreman	5:17
12.	"Red Eyes"	Jon Foreman, Tim Foreman	4:49

Deluxe Edition
No.	Title	Writer(s)	Length
13.	"Mess of Me" (Acoustic)	Jon Foreman, Tim Foreman	3:22
14.	"Always" (Alternate Acoustic Version)	Jon Foreman	4:22
15.	"Stitches" (From the Eastern Hymns for Western Shores EP.)		3:07
16.	"The Sound (John M. Perkins' Blues)" (Music video)		4:47

Japan bonus tracks
No.	Title	Writer(s)	Length
13.	"Lucky Man" (The Verve cover)	Richard Ashcroft	3:14
14.	"The Sound (John M. Perkins' Blues)" (Acoustic)	Jon Foreman, Tim Foreman	3:47

== Personnel ==
Switchfoot

- Jon Foreman – guitar, lead vocals
- Tim Foreman – bass, backing vocals
- Chad Butler – drums, percussion
- Jerome Fontamillas – keyboard, guitar, backing vocals
- Drew Shirley – guitar

Additional musicians

- Keith Tutt, II – cello
- Rob Machado – guest choir vocal ("Always")

Tracks 1, 5–8 and 10–12 recorded at Spot X, San Diego.
Tracks 2–4 and 9 recorded at Phantom Studios, Westlake Village, California.

Mastered at Sterling Sound, New York City.

Additional personnel

- Mike Elizondo – executive producer, production (tracks 2–4 and 9)
- Switchfoot – production, engineering (tracks 1, 5–8 and 10–12)
- Adam Hawkins – mixing, engineering (tracks 2–4 and 9)
- Ted Jensen – mastering
- Darrell Thorp – engineering (tracks 1, 5–8 and 10–12)
- Ryan Petersen – engineering (tracks 1, 5–8 and 10–12)
- Alan Sanderson – engineering (tracks 1, 5–8 and 10–12)
- Shane Wilson – engineering (tracks 1, 5–8 and 10–12)
- Craig Zarkos – engineering (tracks 1, 5–8 and 10–12)
- Brent Arrowood – assistant mix engineer
- Jolie Levine – project coordinator
- Red Light Management – management
- David Levine – touring
- Bruce Flohr – A&R
- Anthony Delia – marketing
- Andy Barron – photography and design
- Rob Gold – art manager
- Michelle Piza – packaging manager

== Charts ==
Chart (2009)	Peak position
New Zealand RIANZ Albums Chart	13
US Billboard 200	13
Billboard Alternative Albums	3
Billboard Christian Albums	2
Billboard Rock Albums	4

=== Year-end charts ===
End of year chart (2010)	Position
Billboard Christian Albums	7

== Building a Hurricane ==
Building a Hurricane

Compilation album by Switchfoot
- Released: November 10, 2009
- Recorded: 2005–09
- Genres: Alternative rock, lo-fi
- Length: 58:00
- Label: lowercase people records
- Producer: Switchfoot

The collector's deluxe edition of Hello Hurricane came packaged with a B-sides album called Building a Hurricane. It features alternate versions of the album tracks, as well as outtakes and demos culled from the studio sessions for Hello Hurricane. This was available via pre-orders only. This deluxe edition was nominated for a Dove Award for Recorded Music Packaging of the Year at the 42nd GMA Dove Awards.

=== Track listing ===
Building a Hurricane
No.	Title	Length
1.	"Needle (Writing Sessions, San Diego, Spring '08)"	1:50
2.	"Needle (July '08 – Take 7)"	4:16
3.	"Mess of Me (Charlie Peacock Sessions, Aug. '07)"	3:05
4.	"Red Eyes (Jan. 12, 2009 – Take 1)"	3:24
5.	"Sing It Out (Writing Session, Raleigh, NC, Fall '08)"	0:44
6.	"Sing It Out (Dark Version, Nov. 22 '08 – Take 6)"	1:46
7.	"The-Voice-Inside-Your-Head Interlude"	0:06
8.	"Your Love Is a Gun (Bullet Soul Early Version)"	3:31
9.	"Enough Reprise"	0:32
10.	"Yet (Dressing Room Demo, Fall '07)"	1:36
11.	"Yet (Nov. 4 '08 – Take 07)"	3:53
12.	"Tambo-Cave-at-Gmail-Dot-Com Interlude"	0:14
13.	"Sing It Out (Demo, Oct. '09, Prog Drums)"	4:35
14.	"Red Eyes (Demo, Early '05)"	2:15
15.	"Always Yours (Nov. 13, '08 – Take 9)"	4:22
16.	"Always Yours, Tim's Unused Bridge"	0:50
17.	"Mess of Me (Demo, Aug. '08 – Take 2, Full Band)"	3:49
18.	"Nicaraguan-Maracas Interlude"	0:25
19.	"Mess of Me (Early Demos)"	2:01
20.	"Your Love Is A Gun (Bullet Soul Laptop Demo)"	3:25
21.	"Hello Hurricane (Early Demos)"	2:22
22.	"Distortion Interlude"	0:06
23.	"Needle (Nov. 18, '08 – Take 12)"	3:33
24.	"Sing It Out (Mar. 19, '09)"	5:29
