= Always (Switchfoot song) =

Single by Switchfoot

from the album Hello Hurricane
- Released: October 28, 2009; February 2010 (Japan release)
- Recorded: 2009
- Genre: Alternative Rock
- Length: 4:20
- Label: lowercase people records WEA; Credential Recordings
- Songwriter(s): Jon Foreman
- Producer(s): Switchfoot; Mike Elizondo; Rob Cavallo

Switchfoot singles chronology
"Mess of Me" (2009)	"Always" (2009)	"The Sound (John M. Perkins' Blues)" (2010)

"Always" is a song written and recorded by American alternative rock band Switchfoot. It was released with "Mess of Me" as one of two lead singles from their seventh studio album, Hello Hurricane. While "Mess of Me" was worked to modern and mainstream rock formats, "Always" was worked to Christian AC/CHR by the band's CCM distributor, Credential Recordings/EMI CMG. It was also released as a single in Japan, while an accompanying music video was made available there.

== Song history ==
"Always" was first played live on September 10, 2009, at the Culture Room in Ft. Lauderdale, Florida.

For its radio release, the band reworked a new version of the song with an added interlude guitar solo part, and a shortened bridge. On September 28, Jon Foreman announced via Twitter that he was "heading up with Tim to work with Rob Cavallo and Mike Elizondo on a song called 'Always' - excited to see where it heads!"

On October 28, the radio edited version was debuted on AOL radio.

On iTunes, an alternate acoustic version of the track is also available with purchase of Hello Hurricane.

== Remix ==
"Always" has been remixed by Max Vangeli and AN21. It was released August 6, 2010 on Atlantic.

== Live performance ==
Switchfoot performed "Always" live on The Late Late Show with Craig Ferguson on January 4, 2010.

== In popular culture ==
- The song was featured in a February 18, 2010 episode of Grey's Anatomy.
- It was later featured in a scene during an episode of The Hills on June 1, 2010.
- It was used in the official video for the iPhone 5 by Apple in 2012.

== Charts ==
Chart (2010)	Peak position
US Hot Christian Songs (Billboard)	25

== Awards ==
In 2010, the song was nominated for a Dove Award for Rock/Contemporary Recorded Song of the Year at the 41st GMA Dove Awards.
