= Pretty Little Demons =

American pop rock duo

- Origin: Los Angeles, California, U.S.
- Genres: Pop rock; power pop; garage rock; pop punk
- Years active: 2012–2015
- Labels: Black Rainbow
- Spinoffs: The Regrettes
- Past members: Lydia Night; Marlhy Murphy
- Website: prettylittledemons.com

Pretty Little Demons was an American pop rock duo formed in Los Angeles, California, in 2012 by guitarist and vocalist Lydia Night and drummer Marlhy Murphy. They are the youngest group to have played South by Southwest and have performed onstage with Brett Anderson of The Donnas and Exene Cervenka of X. Both Murphy and Night went on to form punk rock band The Regrettes in 2015. L.J. Williamson of LA Weekly described the band as the "Best Band To Blow A Little Girl's Mind".

== Musical style ==
The band's musical style has been categorized as pop rock, power punk, garage rock, and pop punk, citing influences including John Bonham, Bloc Party, Arctic Monkeys, Fleetwood Mac, Alison Mosshart, The Marvelettes, Diana Ross and Four Tops. Brett Anderson of The Donnas said that "They work hard, play harder, and their songwriting skills belie their years."

== Discography ==
Studio albums

- Unknown Species (2014)

EPs

- Flowers (2013)

== Members ==
- Lydia Night - lead vocals, guitar
- Marlhy Murphy - drums, backing vocals
