= Your Love Is a Song =

Single by Switchfoot

from the album Hello Hurricane
- Released: March 16, 2010 (Australia iTunes); June 29, 2010 (U.S. Top 40 Radio)
- Recorded: 2009
- Genre: Alternative rock
- Length: 4:19; 3:23 (Chris Lord-Alge AC Mix)
- Label: lowercase people records Atlantic; WEA
- Songwriters: Jon Foreman; Mike Elizondo
- Producers: Switchfoot; Mike Elizondo

Switchfoot singles chronology
"The Sound (John M. Perkins' Blues)" (2010)	"Your Love Is a Song" (2010)	"Bullet Soul" (2010)

"Your Love Is a Song" is a song written and recorded by the alternative rock band Switchfoot. It was first released as a single to the iTunes Store in Australia, and became the third radio single from the band's seventh studio album, Hello Hurricane.

== Song history ==
"Your Love Is a Song" first came together as a collaboration between Switchfoot singer Jon Foreman and the hip hop producer Mike Elizondo. The band had arrived at a standstill in the recording process for Hello Hurricane, having recorded nearly 80 songs and needing an outside perspective to help "make sense of the mess we made", brought Elizondo into the process.

After some phone conversations with Foreman, the two got together and wrote "Your Love Is a Song."

Switchfoot performed the song on The Tonight Show with Jay Leno on November 12, 2010.

A remix of the song was also released by Sven Kirchhof.

== Music video ==
A music video for "Your Love Is a Song" was scheduled for production with actress Jennifer Love Hewitt set to direct. Despite the success of the single, no video was ever made.

== Reception ==
The song netted Switchfoot their first Adult Pop Songs charting song since "We Are One Tonight" entered the tally at No. 29 in 2006. "Your Love Is a Song" peaked at No. 27 and spent 15 weeks on the chart before falling off. It also fared well on the Christian Songs chart, reaching No. 18 and remaining on the chart for 19 weeks.

== In popular culture ==
The song was featured prominently at the end of an episode of One Tree Hill called "You Know I Love You, Don't You".

== Chart ==
Chart (2010)	Peak position
US Adult Pop Airplay (Billboard)	27
US Hot Christian Songs (Billboard)	18
US Rock Digital Songs (Billboard)	35
