= Marlhy Murphy =

American musician (born 2002)

- Born: June 29, 2002 (age 24); Dallas, Texas, U.S.
- Occupations: Musician; actress; television personality; internet personality
- Instruments: Drums; vocals; guitar; bass; mandolin; flute; ukulele
- Years active: 2010–present
- Formerly of: The Regrettes; Zeppos; Pretty Little Demons; Purple Hats and Jetpacks; We're Not Dudes
- Website: www.marlhy.com

Marlhy Murphy (born June 29, 2002) is an American musician, actress, television personality, and internet personality. For her solo music, she goes by the mononym Marlhy. She has worked with bands such as the Regrettes, Pretty Little Demons, Zeppos, We're Not Dudes, and Purple Hats and Jetpacks. She is the youngest performer to ever perform at South by Southwest, and has appeared in Kids React, Nickelodeon's React to That, Amazon's A History of Radness, 2010's The Key, 2014's The Social Worker, 2011's The Great Clubhouse Rescue, 2017's Flunky's Upset, and 2018's Overnights.

== Early life and education ==
Murphy was born in Dallas, Texas. Around 2009, she began to play drums and started taking classes at School of Rock. Murphy also started playing piano when she was in the second grade.

== Career ==
When Murphy was ten, she became the youngest performer at the South by Southwest (SXSW) festival. Murphy's band, the Zeppos, is a Led Zeppelin tribute band. The young members of We're Not Dudes and Pretty Little Demons, she met at the School of Rock in Dallas.

On April 15, 2025, American Songwriter Magazine announced Murphy as the Indie Category Winner of the 2024 American Songwriter Song Contest.

== Discography ==
=== Solo ===
==== Extended plays ====
- Ghost (2021)

==== Studio albums ====
- the thoughts that keep me up at night (2025)

==== Singles ====
- "Claustrophobic" (2019)
- "Green Light" (2019)
- "Bubbles" (2019)
- "C'est La Vie" (2019)
- "Ain't on Me" (2019)
- "Make Em' Hurt" (2019)
- "Drive Away" (2019)
- "Drive Away (Acoustic)" (2020)
- "I'd Rather Be Dumb" (2020)
- "Green Light (Arrows Remix)" (2020)
- "Lowkey" (2020)
- "See You Soon" (2020)
- "Want Too" (2020)
- "I See Through You" (2020)
- "R.I.P." (2020)
- "Betcha" (2020)
- "I Know You Still Feel Something" (2021)
- "Villain" (2021)
- "Precious" (2021)
- "Heartbreak Weekend" (2022)
- "Happy Yet" (2022)
- "Cruise Control" (2022)
- "Scared to Die" (2022)
- "Ruined It" (2022)
- "Phases" (2022)
- "Demons" (2022)
- "Kamikaze" (2023)
- "Temporary" (2023)
- "Studio Apartment" (2023)
- "Kids" (2023)
- "Love to Kill" (2023)
- "Fashion Show" (2023)
- "Too Close for Comfort" (2023)
- "Wouldn't do the Same" (2023)
- "Young and Naive" (2024)
- "Debbie Downer" (2024)
- "you." (2024)
- "Hotel Bar" (2024)
- "paint dry (I'M FINE)" (2024)
- "walls" (2024)
- ": black" (2024)
- "weatherman" (2024)
- "little things" (2025)
- "what am I doing wrong" (2025)
- "Out the Blue" with Voila (2025)
- "the thoughts that keep me up at night" (2025)
- "heatwave" (2025)
- "safe with me" (2025)
- "paper cups" (2025)
- "where there's smoke there's fire" (2025)
- "ready set no" (2026)
- "quicksad" (2026)
- "happiest lil pessimist" (2026)
- "little misfortune" (2026)

==== Features ====
- Ashes Sippy (2025)
- Waiting Room Jon Casey (2025)
- Kill Me To Know Duke & Jones (2025)
- Real Love Yetep (2024)
- Fault Line Pauline Herr (2024)
- Undertow Tsunami (2024)
- Perfect World Conro (2024)
- Call Me (Chill Mix) Duke & Jones (2023)
- One Chance NGHTMRE & Knock2 (2023)
- Call Me Duke & Jones (2023)
- State of Mind (TELYKast Remix) Duke & Jones (2023)
- State of Mind Duke & Jones (2022)
- Teardrop NGHTMRE & Virtual Riot (2022)
- Cinema (Fame & Fortune VIP) OddKidOut (2022)
- Asking for a Friend Hook & Sling (2022)
- Back to My Love Tritonal (2022)
- Nothing More to Say May Styler (2022)
- Would U Dirty Audio (2022)
- Cinema OddKidOut (2022)
- Bittersweet OddKidOut (2022)
- Blaming Myself Athelo (2021)
- USED 2 YOU OddKidOut (2021)
- Think of You Zookeper (2021)
- Every Time MC4D (2020)

=== With Pretty Little Demons ===
==== Albums ====
- Unknown Species (2014)

==== Extended plays ====
- Flowers (2013)

=== With Zeppos ===
- Zeppos I (2014)

=== With The Regrettes ===
==== Extended plays ====
- Hey! (2015)

==== Singles ====
- "Hey Now" (2015)

=== Composition credits ===
- Feel Your Feelings Fool! (2017)
- Attention Seeker (2018)

== Filmography ==
=== Film ===
Year	Title	Role	Notes
2010	The Key	Young Alex	Short film
2011	The Great Club House Rescue	Ashley	Short film
2014	The Social Worker	Juliana Stein	Short film
2026	Orange Justice	Lacey	Feature

=== Television ===
Year	Title	Role	Notes
2014	React to That	Herself	4 episodes
2015	A History of Radness	Tessie	Television film
2016	Target	Drummer	Television commercial
2016	Dole Fruitocracy: For the Free	Drummer	Television commercial
2017	Vodafone	Drummer	Television commercial
2017	Flunkey's Upset	Stephanie Stewart	Main role
2018	Overnights	Stephanie Stewart	Main role
2018	Baby Doll Records	Stephanie Stewart	Recurring role
2018–2020	Chicken Girls	Stephanie Stewart	Recurring role (season 2); main role (season 3–6)

=== Web ===
Year	Title	Role	Notes
2011–2015; 2017–2020	React	Herself	FBE YouTube Channel
