= Music Builds Tour =

2008 concert tour

- Tour by Switchfoot, Third Day, Robert Randolph and the Family Band and Jars of Clay
- Start date: August 21, 2008
- End date: October 12, 2008
- Legs: 1
- No. of shows: 23
Switchfoot tour chronology
| Up in Arms Tour (2008) | Music Builds Tour (2008) | Crazy Making Tour (2009) |

The Music Builds Tour was a 23-show festival-style concert tour spanning three months in late 2008. Rock bands Switchfoot and Robert Randolph and the Family Band, along with Third Day and Jars of Clay co-headlined the event.

This is a new model for touring that we are really excited about, it is so much bigger than the music itself. This is about seeing the world change. In keeping with that dream, the "Music Builds Tour" is a traveling festival that will benefit Habitat for Humanity, an amazing organization providing homes to needy families around the globe.

— Switchfoot drummer Chad Butler

As such, the tour benefited local Habitat for Humanity chapters in the tour cities, through a program combining "Hollywood For Habitat For Humanity," the concert production company Live Nation, and the bands. The tour has been depicted in two concert films, Third Day's Live Revelation and Switchfoot's The Best Yet Live in Nashville. One music video was shot during the tour, that being the second version of Switchfoot's "This Is Home."

== Itinerary ==
The tour began with a kick-off show on April 21, 2008 at the Wild Horse Saloon in Nashville, Tennessee.

The main tour began August 21 at the DTE Energy Music Theatre in Clarkston, Michigan and concluded at the Broomfield Event Center in Denver, Colorado on October 12.

== Stage design ==
The tour played mostly in large arenas and amphitheaters. It featured an elaborate stage set-up, which included one large LED display screen behind the performers and two video screens overhead. The tour, keeping with the festival theme, also featured a side stage that featured bands such as Red.

== Philanthropy efforts ==
The tour benefited Habitat for Humanity's home building program in several different ways. For one, the artists on the tour donate $1 to the charity for each ticket sold during the tour. Additionally, the funds that were raised from various ticket auctions, special merchandise items, and event packages were allocated to help fund Habitat for Humanity in each tour stop city. The bands also were found at the various Habitat for Humanity build sites during the tour personally helping in the construction of Habitat for Humanity-sponsored homes, and also invited some of the current and future homeowners to attend the shows.

== Tour dates ==
| Date | City | Country | Venue |
|---|---|---|---|
| August 21, 2008 | Clarkston | United States | DTE Energy Music Theatre |
| August 22, 2008 | Noblesville | United States | Verizon Wireless Music Center |
| August 23, 2008 | Chicago | United States | Charter One Pavilion |
| September 7, 2008 | West Palm Beach | United States | Cruzan Amphitheatre |
| September 11, 2008 | Cuyahoga Falls | United States | Blossom Music Center |
| September 12, 2008 | Virginia Beach | United States | Verizon Wireless Amphitheater |
| September 13, 2008 | Holmdel Township | United States | PNC Bank Arts Center |
| September 14, 2008 | Bristow | United States | Nissan Pavilion |
| September 18, 2008 | Pelham | United States | Verizon Wireless Music Center |
| September 19, 2008 | Raleigh | United States | Time Warner Cable Music Pavilion |
| September 20, 2008 | Atlanta | United States | Lakewood Amphitheater |
| September 21, 2008 | Nashville | United States | Bridgestone Arena |
| September 25, 2008 | Phoenix | United States | Dodge Theatre |
| September 26, 2008 | Irvine | United States | Verizon Wireless Amphitheater |
| September 27, 2008 | Chula Vista | United States | Coors Amphitheatre |
| September 28, 2008 | Wheatland | United States | Sleep Train Amphitheatre |
| October 2, 2008 | Dallas | United States | SuperPages.com Center |
| October 3, 2008 | ~~The Woodlands~~; Cypress | United States | ~~Cynthia Woods Mitchell Pavilion~~; Richard E. Berry Educational Support Center; Relocated due to damage by Hurricane Ike |
| October 4, 2008 | Selma | United States | Verizon Wireless Amphitheater |
| October 5, 2008 | Oklahoma City | United States | Ford Center |
| October 10, 2008 | Minneapolis | United States | Target Center |
| October 11, 2008 | Kansas City | United States | Starlight Theatre |
| October 12, 2008 | Broomfield | United States | Broomfield Event Center |
