= Crazy Making Tour =

2009 concert tour by Switchfoot and Blue October

- Tour by Switchfoot and Blue October
- Associated album: Oh! Gravity. (Switchfoot); Approaching Normal (Blue October)
- Start date: July 26, 2009
- End date: August 29, 2009
- Legs: 1
- No. of shows: 21
Switchfoot tour chronology
Music Builds Tour (2008)	Crazy Making Tour (2009)	Hello Hurricane Tour (2009)

The Crazy Making Tour was a 2009 summer tour which featured the alternative rock bands Switchfoot and Blue October co-headlining. The tour was first announced on Blue October's Myspace profile and Switchfoot's Twitter feed. Supporting acts for the tour were Longwave and Ours. Each band's set varied by location. Some shows had one playing significantly longer, but others had the time split equally.

== Itinerary ==
The tour dates were first announced May 28 on both band's respective websites and profiles.

The tour spanned two months in the summer, and began in Council Bluffs, Iowa, and concluded in Hampton Beach, New Hampshire. The sizes of the shows varied, with the bands mostly playing in mid-sized to large auditoriums, theaters, and rock clubs.

== Tickets ==
Pre-sale for the shows began on June 1, available exclusively to Switchfoot and Blue October fans. Sales to the general public went live June 5. Prices were relatively affordable, with general admissions tickets going for an average of $33 each.

== Tour dates ==
Date	City	Country	Venue
July 26, 2009	Council Bluffs	United States	Stir Cove
July 27, 2009	Denver	United States	Fillmore Auditorium
July 28, 2009	Magna	United States	The Salt Air
July 31, 2009	Portland	United States	Crystal Ballroom
August 1, 2009	San Jose	United States	San Jose Civic Auditorium
August 5, 2009	Los Angeles	United States	The Wiltern
August 6, 2009	Las Vegas	United States	House of Blues
August 7, 2009	San Diego	United States	Wavehouse
August 8, 2009	Tempe	United States	Marquee Theatre
August 9, 2009	El Paso	United States	Abraham Chavez Theatre
August 13, 2009	Lake Charles	United States	L'Auberge Casino
August 14, 2009	Houston	United States	Verizon Wireless Theater
August 15, 2009	Dallas	United States	House of Blues
August 16, 2009	Dallas	United States	House of Blues
August 20, 2009	Louisville	United States	Fourth Street Live!
August 21, 2009	Atlanta	United States	The Masquerade
August 22, 2009	Myrtle Beach	United States	House of Blues
August 23, 2009	Baltimore	United States	Rams Head Live!
August 27, 2009	Atlantic City	United States	House of Blues
August 28, 2009	New York City	United States	NY Terminal 5
August 29, 2009	Hampton Beach	United States	Hampton Beach Casino Ballroom
