= Further Joy (album) =

Studio album by the Regrettes
- Released: April 8, 2022
- Genre: Synth-pop, new wave, dance-pop, pop-punk, indie pop
- Length: 43:45
- Label: Warner
- Producer: Jacknife Lee, Tim Pagnotta

The Regrettes chronology
How Do You Love? (2019)	Further Joy (2022)

Singles from Further Joy
- 1. "Monday" Released: September 24, 2021; 2. "You're So Fucking Pretty" Released: December 3, 2021; 3. "That's What Makes Me Love You" Released: March 7, 2022; 4. "Anxieties (Out of Time)" Released: March 30, 2022

Further Joy is the third and final studio album by American rock band the Regrettes. The album was released on April 8, 2022, by Warner Records. The album moves away from the punk and riot-grrl sound established in their previous releases, and opts for a more upbeat, pop sound. It received critical acclaim.

== Critical reception ==
Professional ratings
Aggregate scores
Source	Rating
AnyDecentMusic?	7.5/10
Metacritic	84/100
Review scores
Source	Rating
Allmusic	4/5 stars
Clash	8/10
DIY	4/5 stars
NME	4/5 stars

Further Joy received widespread critical acclaim by contemporary music critics upon release. On review aggregator website, Metacritic, the album has an average rating of 84 out of 100 indicating "universal acclaim based on five critic reviews". On AnyDecentMusic?, Further Joy has a 7.5 out of 10 rating.

Stephen Thomas Erlewine, writing for Allmusic gave Further Joy four stars out of five. Erlewine praised the tone and direction of the album saying "the thrust of Further Joy is unmistakably positive, an album where the Regrettes deliberately choose positivity instead of negative energy. This could've been a cloying direction if it weren't for Night's sharp skills as a songwriter, the palpable chemistry of the Regrettes, and the sleek shine of the production, each contributing to the exuberance of Further Joy.

== Track listing ==
Further Joy track listing
No.	Title	Length
1.	"Anxieties (Out of Time)"	3:40
2.	"Monday"	2:56
3.	"That's What Makes Me Love You"	2:36
4.	"Barely on My Mind"	3:18
5.	"Subtleties (Never Giving Up On You)"	2:47
6.	"La Di Da"	4:06
7.	"Homesick"	3:38
8.	"Better Now"	3:09
9.	"Rosy"	3:04
10.	"You're So Fucking Pretty"	3:49
11.	"Step 9"	3:58
12.	"Nowhere"	3:10
13.	"Show Me You Want Me"	3:29
Total length:		43:45

Further Joy Deluxe track listing
No.	Title	Length
14.	"Dummy"	3:17
15.	"Shapeshifter"	3:14
16.	"Answer"	2:19
Total length:		52:53
