= The Regrettes =

2015–2023 American punk rock band

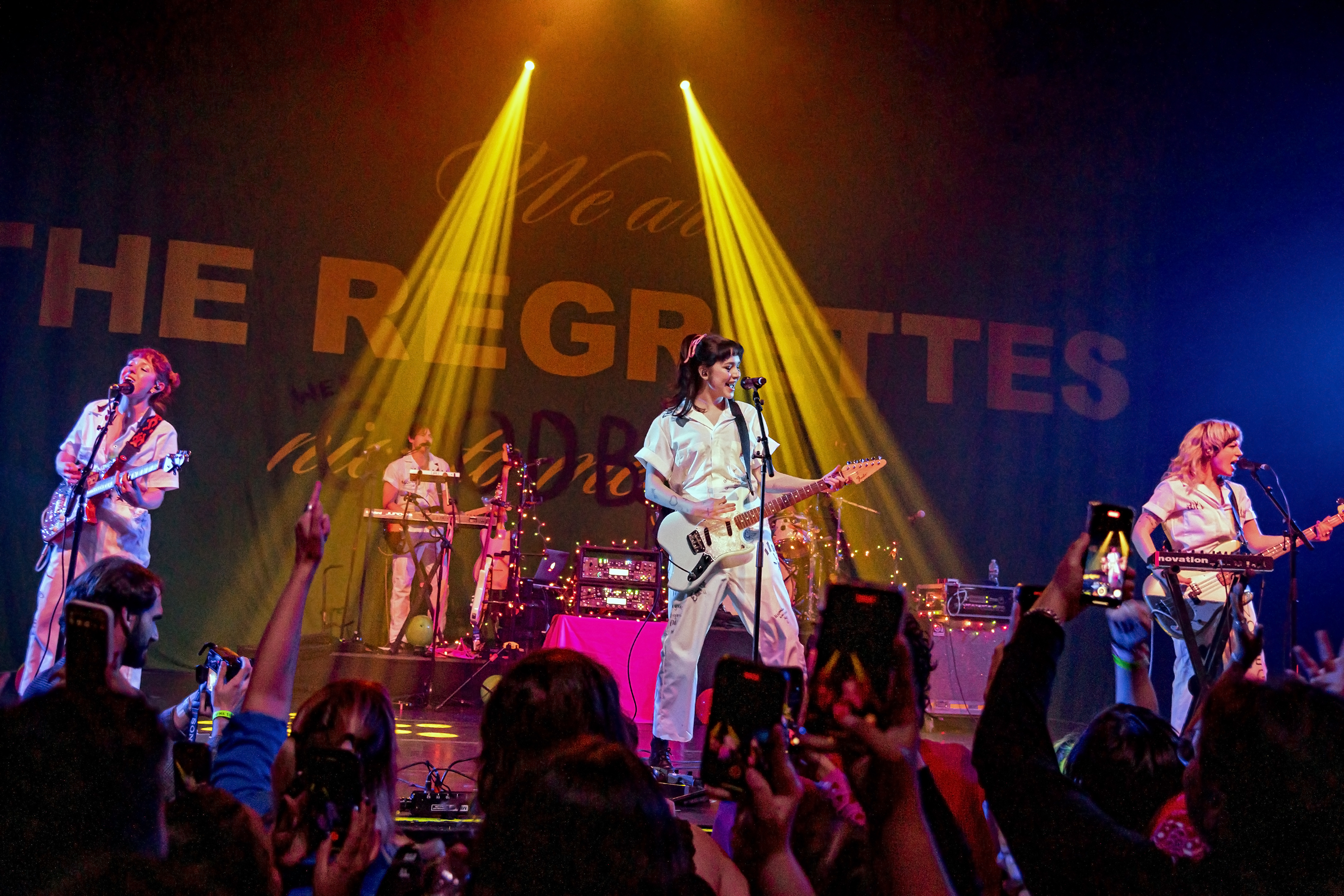
- The Regrettes performing in 2023

Background information
- Origin: Los Angeles, California, U.S.
- Genres: Punk rock; riot grrrl; garage pop; garage punk
- Years active: 2015–2023
- Labels: Warner, Black Rainbow
- Spinoffs: Liily
- Spinoff of: Pretty Little Demons
- Past members: Lydia Night; Marlhy Murphy; Genessa Gariano; Maxx Morando; Sage Chavis; Violet Mayugba; Drew Thomsen; Brooke Dickson
- Website: theregrettes.com

The Regrettes were an American punk rock band from Los Angeles. The band was led by frontwoman Lydia Night. They released three studio albums on Warner Records: Feel Your Feelings Fool! (2017), How Do You Love? (2019), and Further Joy (2022).

== History ==
=== 2015: Early career and Hey! EP ===
Prior to the formation of the band, lead vocalist Lydia Night met guitarist Genessa Gariano, bassist Sage Chavis, and drummer Maxx Morando in music school. At the time, Gariano, Chavis and Morando were in a band together, called "Genessa" and Night was in the two-piece band Pretty Little Demons (who changed their name to The Regrettes in the last few months of life) with drummer Marlhy Murphy. Both of the bands played a concert together, but soon after Murphy departed from the band after the release of their EP "Hey!" on October 16, 2015, leading to Night asking Gariano, Chavis, and Morando to join. The "Hey!" EP came to the attention of a representative at Warner Brothers, which would eventually led to them signing the band. In 2016, the band toured with both Tacocat and Sleigh Bells, opened for Kate Nash, and performed at South by Southwest.

=== 2015–2017: Feel Your Feelings Fool! ===
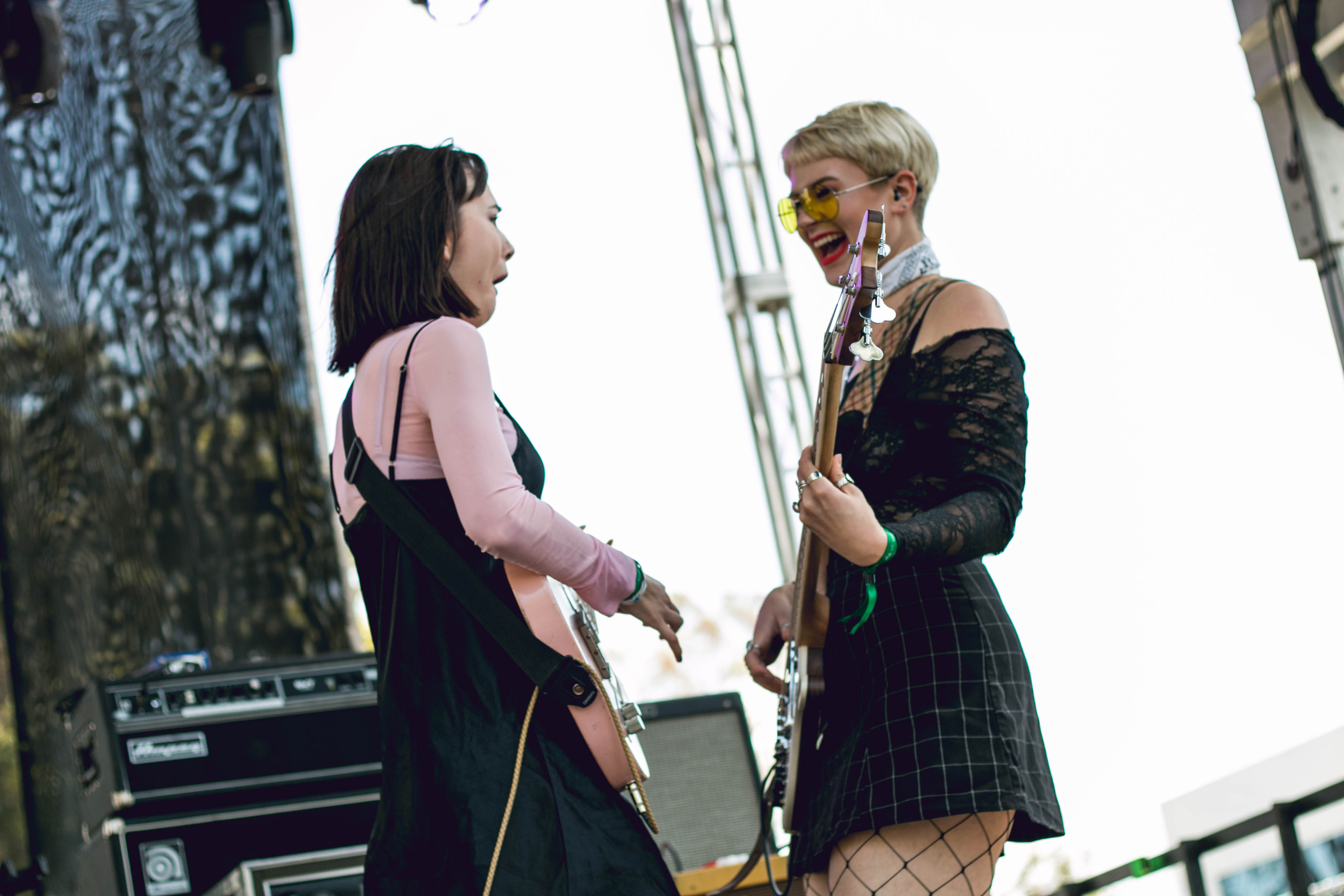
Night (left) and Sage Chavis (right) performing at When We Were Young Festival 2017

In 2015, the band's independent release led to a record deal with Warner Bros. Records. Their first album was produced by Mike Elizondo and their first single, "A Living Human Girl", was released in June 2016. Other singles followed including "Hey Now", "Hot", and "Seashore." On January 13, 2017, the band released its debut studio album, Feel Your Feelings Fool!. In May 2017, the band announced a summer headlining tour which includes stops at Summerfest and Riot Fest. On February 9, 2018, the band released the single "Come Through," from their EP Attention Seeker, released on February 23, 2018. It was accompanied by a music video. On May 9, 2018, the band announced Morando's departure. On May 22, 2018, the tour bus containing all their belongings was stolen from outside the Sunflower Lounge, Birmingham, UK where they later played a sold-out gig. On May 31, 2018, the band contributed the sixth Hamildrop, a cover of the song "Helpless". Lin-Manuel Miranda credited producer Mike Elizondo as having suggested the idea. On September 3, 2018, the band announced Sage Chavis' departure, being replaced by Violet Mayugba.

=== 2018–2023: How Do You Love?, Further Joy, and disbandment ===
On November 28, 2018, the band announced the departure of Mayugba and recruitment of Brooke Dickson as their new bass player. From February 6 to March 17, 2019, The Regrettes were the opening act of Twenty One Pilots' European leg of The Bandito Tour. On June 18, 2019, the band announced their second studio album, How Do You Love?. The album was released on August 9, 2019. The song "I Dare You" was the 77th-best-performing single of 2019 on the Tokio Hot 100.

The Regrettes released their third studio album, Further Joy, on April 8, 2022.

On November 14, 2023, the band announced that they were splitting up to "work on other projects." In tandem, they announced a farewell show at the Fonda Theater on December 21, 2023.

== Musical style ==
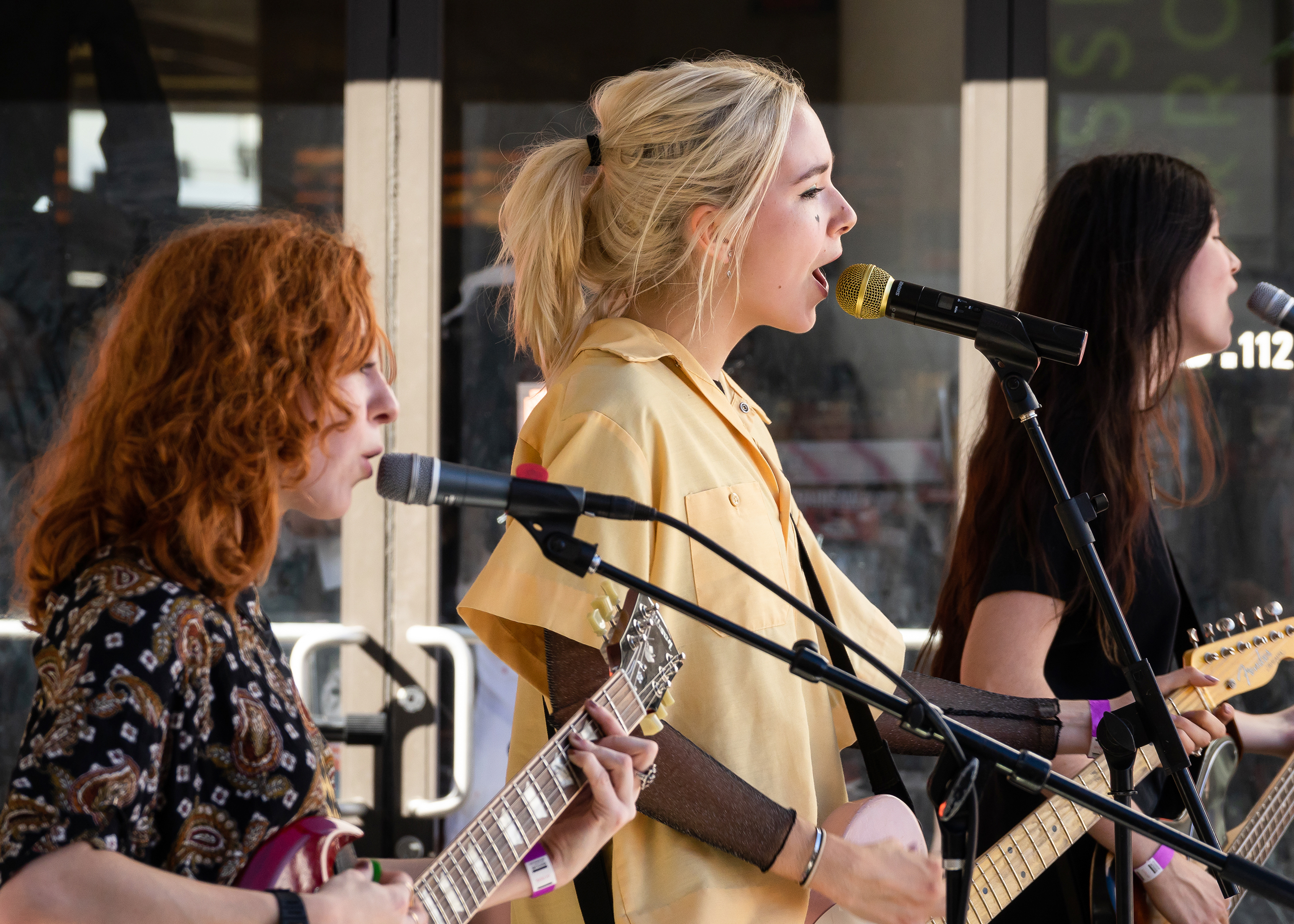
The Regrettes performing in 2018. Left to right: Gariano, Night, Violet Mayugba

The Regrettes' musical style has been labeled as punk rock, riot grrrl, garage pop, and garage punk, featuring elements of garage rock, '60s doo-wop and surf music, rockabilly, and pop music. Michael Bialas, a writer at PopMatters described their sound as "girl-group power-pop-punk" In an article by Culture Collide, their style was described as "Channeling classic doo-wop through a catchy garage-punk filter" and as bringing "a level of impassioned aggression to tried-and-true pop structures, creating a compelling product with significant crossover appeal."

Lyrically, their music has been described as following themes such as women's empowerment, feminism, politics, and love. In an article by The Verge, their lyrics were described as "brash and unapologetic".

They also cite musical influences including Bikini Kill, L7, 7 Year Bitch, Elvis Presley, Buddy Holly, The Ronettes, Hole, The Crystals, Lesley Gore and Patsy Cline.

== Band members ==
Final lineup

- Lydia Night – lead vocals, rhythm guitar, keyboards (2015–2023), lead guitar, bass (2015)
- Genessa Gariano – lead guitar, keyboards, backing vocals (2015–2023)
- Brooke Dickson – bass, keyboards, backing vocals (2018–2023)
- Drew Thomsen – drums, percussion, backing vocals (2018–2023)

Former members

- Marlhy Murphy – drums, backing vocals (2015)
- Maxx Morando – drums (2015–2018)
- Sage Chavis – bass, backing vocals (2015–2018)
- Violet Mayugba – bass, backing vocals (2018)

Timeline

== Discography ==
=== Studio albums ===
- Feel Your Feelings Fool! (2017)
- How Do You Love? (2019)
- Further Joy (2022)

=== EPs ===
- Hey! (2015)
- Attention Seeker (2018)

=== Singles ===
- "Hey Now" (2015)
- "A Living Human Girl" (2016)
- "Hey Now" (2016)
- "Hot" (2016)
- "Seashore" (2016)
- "Marshmallow World" (Bing Crosby cover) (2016)
- "Back in Your Head" (Tegan and Sara cover) (2017)
- "Come Through" (2018)
- "Helpless" (Hamilton cover) (2018)
- "California Friends" (2018)
- "Poor Boy" (2018)
- "Don't Stop Me Now" (Queen cover) (2018)
- "Pumpkin" (2019)
- "Dress Up" (2019)
- "I Dare You" (2019)
- "Holiday-ish" (ft. Dylan Minnette) (2019)
- "What Am I Gonna Do Today" (2020)
- "I Love Us" (2020)
- "Monday" (2021)
- "You're So Fucking Pretty" (2021)
- "That's What Makes Me Love You" (2022)
- "Anxieties (Out Of Time)" (2022)
- "Barely On My Mind" (2022)
- "Dancing on My Own" (Robyn cover) (2023)
