= The Sound (John M. Perkins' Blues) =

Single by Switchfoot

from the album Hello Hurricane
- Released: October 27, 2009 (digital single); April 27, 2010 (U.S. radio)
- Recorded: 2009
- Genre: Alternative rock, post-grunge, hard rock
- Length: 3:47
- Label: lowercase people/Atlantic
- Songwriter(s): Jon Foreman, Tim Foreman
- Producer(s): Switchfoot, Mike Elizondo

Switchfoot singles chronology
"Always" (2009)	"The Sound (John M. Perkins' Blues)" (2009)	"Your Love Is a Song" (2010)

"The Sound (John M. Perkins' Blues)" is a song written and recorded by Jon Foreman and Tim Foreman for the alternative rock band Switchfoot. It is a track from the band's seventh studio album, Hello Hurricane, and was released as a digital single on October 27, 2009, to all major digital outlets. It was serviced to alternative rock radio on April 27, 2010, becoming their second Top 15 hit from the album, and the band's first Top 10 single since "Dare You to Move."

== Song history ==
"The Sound" is a song that references John M. Perkins, an American civil rights activist, in the lyrics "John Perkins said it right / Love is the final fight." The lyrical bent of the song speaks of the country's past racism that still "runs through our veins" and cries out from the ground. Jon Foreman intended for the song to be part of the answer to that, saying that it is like "rising above the constant gnawing of past wrongs" and declaring Love as "the reconciliation. The deliberate act of forgiveness."

Inspired by his reading of Perkins' book, Let Justice Roll Down, Foreman set out to bring more awareness to the activist's story, adamant that "John Perkins is a hero whose name needs to be known." So he wrote the song intentionally avoiding historical plotlines, while instead attempting to "make an impressionistic sketch" of the story.

"The Sound (John Perkins Blues) is a very important song for us as a band. I see so much hatred and fear around me, I see so many people living out their pain. I hear it on the radio. I see it in the headlines. John Perkins story needs to be heard. This song was inspired by a man who sang a louder song than hatred. In a world where we are defined by our differences, Mr. Perkins's life of service and compassion is a tangible demonstration of what it means to live a life of love. Love is the loudest song we could sing. Louder than racism. Louder than fear. Louder than hatred. John Perkins said it right, love is the final fight. We're excited to hear this song on the radio, louder than pain."

— Jon Foreman

== Music video(s) ==
A music video for the song was directed and was available on iTunes on the same day Hello Hurricane was released featuring live footage and taken from the Live at Spot X in-studio performances, included in the Making of Hello Hurricane DVD. A concept music video was shot, with footage of the band filmed on May 4, 2010 and footage of John Perkins himself shot on May 14. The music video was premiered on Yahoo Music on June 13, 2010 and made its way onto YouTube three days later.

== Reception ==
The song and its accompanying video have garnered many accolades from industry sources, garnering a Video of the Day mention on Fuse TV on July 8, 2010. The song got particular coverage from KROQ-FM in Los Angeles, getting featured as "Stryker's No. 1 Video of the Week" on August 11, 2010, and a few days later, "Stryker’s #1 Requested Song".

This attention fueled the song's march towards the top 10 of Alternative Songs, a run that saw the song spend 24 weeks on the chart with a peak of No. 7. It is the band's third-highest showing on this particular survey, behind 2004's "Meant to Live" and 2011's "Dark Horses", which both reached No. 5.

== Awards ==
The song was nominated for a Dove Award for Rock Recorded Song of the Year at the 42nd GMA Dove Awards.

== Other appearances ==
- "The Sound" was featured in Verizon's Blackberry Storm 2 ad, which ran throughout the month of November 2009.
- The song was prominently featured on several commercial outros during the 2010 BCS National Championship Game national television broadcast.
- It appeared briefly in a TV spot for the movie The Sorcerer's Apprentice.
- A snippet of the song's music video was featured during a segment of E! News in August.
- The song was featured in promotional videos for the 9th season of CSI: Miami.
- The song is featured as part of the Tony Hawk: Shred soundtrack.
- The song was aired during the ESPN telecast of the 2011 BCS National Championship Game, and was also featured throughout the 2011 Bowl Championship season.
- The St. Louis Blues' TV affiliate, Fox Sports Midwest, use the song as part of the team's pregame introduction on that channel.
- The song appears on the official licensed soundtrack for the Shift 2: Unleashed video game.
- The song is used in the film, The Cabin in the Woods, filmed in 2009 but released in 2012.

== Charts ==
Chart (2010)	Peak position
Canada Rock (Billboard)	36
US Christian Digital Songs (Billboard)	32
US Hot Rock & Alternative Songs (Billboard)	15

=== Year-end charts ===
Chart (2010)	Position
US Alternative Songs (Billboard)	6
