= Attention Seeker (EP) =

EP by The Regrettes
- Released: 12 January 2018
- Genre: Punk rock; power pop; garage punk; doo-wop
- Length: 13:32
- Label: Warner Bros.
- Producer: Mike Elizondo

The Regrettes chronology
Feel Your Feelings Fool! (2017)	Attention Seeker (2018)	How Do You Love? (2019)

Singles from Attention Seeker
- 1. "Come Through" Released: 9 February 2018

Attention Seeker is the second extended play record by American punk rock band The Regrettes. It was released on 12 January 2018 through Warner Bros. The EP was produced by Mike Elizondo.

== Track listing ==
No.	Title	Writer(s)	Length
1.	"Come Through"	Lydia Night; Mike Elizondo	2:48
2.	"Red Light"	Night	2:59
3.	"A Teenager in Love"	Doc Pomus; Mort Shuman	2:49
4.	"Hey Now (Acoustic)"	Night; Marlhy Murphy	3:30
5.	"A Living Human Girl (Acoustic)"	Night; Murphy	2:46
Total length:			13:32

== Personnel ==
=== The Regrettes ===
- Lydia Night - lead vocals, rhythm guitar, composition
- Genessa Gariano - lead guitar, backing vocals, composition, artwork
- Sage Chavis - bass, backing vocals, composition
- Maxx Morando - drums, composition

=== Additional personnel ===
- Mike Elizondo - production, composition
- Brent Arrowood - engineering
- Adam Hawkins - engineering, mixing
- Alonzo Lazaro - assistant production
- Bob Ludwig - mastering
- Marlhy Murphy - composition
- Doc Pomus - composition
- Mort Shuman - composition
