= Feel Your Feelings Fool! =

Studio album by The Regrettes
- Released: January 13, 2017
- Recorded: 2016 at Can-AM in Tarzana, California
- Genre: Punk rock; riot grrrl
- Length: 46:48
- Label: Warner Bros.
- Producer: Mike Elizondo

The Regrettes chronology
Hey! EP (2015)	Feel Your Feelings Fool! (2017)	Attention Seeker (2018)

Singles from Feel Your Feelings Fool!
- 1. "A Living Human Girl" Released: 20 June 2016; 2. "Hey Now" Released: 15 September 2016; 3. "Hot" Released: 23 September 2016; 4. "Seashore" Released: 11 November 2016

Feel Your Feelings Fool! is the debut studio album by American punk rock band The Regrettes. It was released on January 13, 2017, through Warner Bros. Records, and received positive reviews from music critics, garnering comparisons to 1960s girl-groups and more recent punk-rock bands. The album title comes from a lyric in the track, "Head in the Clouds." The album includes three singles.

== Background ==
The Regrettes were formed by Lydia Night in late 2015. She had previously been a member of a rock duo, but when the group dissolved suddenly, she began a new band. According to AllMusic, she formed the group "with guitarist Genessa Gariano, bassist Sage Nicole, and drummer Maxx Morando", all of whom she had previously met at The School of Rock. The group signed with Warner Bros. in 2016, touring with acts including Sleigh Bells and Kate Nash and recorded their album shortly thereafter. Many of the songs were recorded within days or weeks of their writing. Three of the album's songs were released as singles—"A Living Human Girl", "Hey Now", and "Hot"—all in 2016 ahead of the album's release. The former was premiered on Rookie in June 2016. In November 2016, ahead of the album's release, the group recorded a cover of "Marshmallow World", which was made available on 7" vinyl.

According to Lydia Night, all of the songs she wrote were based on real experiences, many of which involved a crush, and wanted to write empowering music. Night told The LA Times that “For this band, our main goal is just to write honest music about ourselves and the people around us and the things that we experience,” she says. “I think that people need a friend sometimes -- a friend who isn't always there. A lot of people don't have anyone to relate to.” In regard to the title of the album, Night stated that "it's about wanting to feel things and hiding that feeling—and feeling weird about feeling things. I think that's where so many people's insecurities stem from. It's our message and the message of this album." Night also stated that she fell in love for the first time while recording the album, and that that experience played a role in some of the songs she subsequently wrote and performed.

== Critical reception ==
Professional ratings
Aggregate scores
Source	Rating
Metacritic	82/100
Review scores
Source	Rating
AllMusic	4/5 stars
Austin Chronicle	3.5/5 stars
Alternative Press	4/5 stars
Exclaim!	7/10

Feel Your Feelings Fool! was met with universal acclaim from critics, earning a score of 82/100 on review aggregate site MetaCritic. Exclaim awarded the album 7/10, describing the group's sound as "Bikini Kill meets the Ronettes" and praising the group's lyrics, but was skeptical of the album's "cleanliness" production-wise, feeling the end effect was "jarring". AllMusic's review, written by Stephen Thomas Erlewine, also noted that the group sounded similar to 1960's girl groups, going on to praise the album's "hook(s) and song construction" and conclude that the album was "craft that endures combined with boundless excitement." The Young Folks' Bri Lockheart gave the album 8/10 and praised the group's attitude and the lyrics' relatability.

== Track listing ==
All tracks written by Lydia Night, except where noted.

No.	Title	Writer(s)	Length
1.	"I Don't Like You"		2:46
2.	"A Living Human Girl"	Night; Marlhy Murphy	2:37
3.	"Hey Now"	Night; Murphy	3:29
4.	"Hot"	Night; Murphy	2:40
5.	"Seashore"		3:28
6.	"Juicebox Baby"		1:51
7.	"'Til Tomorrow"		2:51
8.	"Pale Skin"	Night; Murphy	5:27
9.	"Lacy Loo"	Night; Genessa Gariano	2:53
10.	"Head in the Clouds"		2:03
11.	"How It Should Be"		2:37
12.	"Picture Perfect"	Night; Herby Azor; Raymond Davies	2:48
13.	"Bronze"	Night; Murphy	4:00
14.	"Ladylike/WHATTA BITCH"		1:52
15.	"You Won't Do" (includes hidden track "Cold")		5:26
Total length:			46:48

== Personnel ==
Adapted from album booklet and AllMusic.

=== The Regrettes ===
- Lydia Night - lead vocals, rhythm guitar
- Genessa Gariano - lead guitar, backing vocals
- Sage Chavis - bass, backing vocals
- Maxx Morando - drums

=== Additional personnel ===
- Brent Arrowood – assistant engineer
- Beth Boeckel – album cover designer
- Mike Elizondo – A&R
- Mike Fasano – drum technician
- Adam Hawkins – engineer, mixer
- Bob Ludwig – mastering
- Bachel Many – art direction
- Claire Marie Vogel – photographer
