= List of 2006 albums =

The following is a list of albums, EPs, and mixtapes released in 2006. These albums are (1) original, i.e. excluding reissues, remasters, and compilations of previously released recordings, and (2) notable, defined as having received significant coverage from reliable sources independent of the subject.

For additional information about bands formed, reformed, disbanded, or on hiatus, for deaths of musicians, and for links to musical awards, see 2006 in music.

== First quarter ==
=== January ===
List of albums released in January 2006
Go to: January | February | March | April | May | June | July | August | September | October | November | December | Back to top
Release date	Artist	Album	Genre	Label	Ref.
January 1	Ayumi Hamasaki	(Miss)understood	J-pop, dance-pop, pop rock	Avex Trax	
January 10	Bleeding Through	The Truth	Metalcore, hardcore punk, death metal	Trustkill, Roadrunner	
January 10	BR549	Dog Days		Dualtone	
January 10	Jack Ingram	Live: Wherever You Are	Country	Big Machine	
January 10	High School Musical cast	High School Musical	Pop, teen pop, dance-pop	Walt Disney	
January 10	Kayo Dot	Dowsing Anemone with Copper Tongue	Experimental music, post-rock, avant-garde metal	Robotic Empire	
January 10	Morningwood	Morningwood	Alternative rock, dance-rock, electropunk	Capitol	
January 13	Eric Burdon	Soul of a Man	Blues rock	SPV	
January 19	Mutemath	Mutemath	Alternative rock, post-rock	Teleprompt, Warner Bros.	
January 20	Cat Power	The Greatest	Indie rock, soul, country	Matador	
January 20	Edguy	Rocket Ride	Power metal, progressive metal, hard rock	Nuclear Blast	
January 23	Arctic Monkeys	Whatever People Say I Am, That's What I'm Not	Indie rock, garage rock, post-punk revival	Domino	
January 23	Clearlake	Amber	Indie rock	Domino	
January 23	The Kooks	Inside In / Inside Out	Indie rock, post-punk revival, post-Britpop	Virgin	
January 23	Richard Ashcroft	Keys to the World	Post-Britpop, folk rock	Parlophone	
January 23	Rosanne Cash	Black Cadillac	Country folk, Americana	Capitol	
January 24	Ace Frehley	Greatest Hits Live	Hard rock	Megaforce	
January 24	Tha Alkaholiks	Firewater	Hip-hop	Waxploitation, Koch	
January 24	CunninLynguists	A Piece of Strange	Hip-hop, Southern hip-hop, underground hip-hop	QN5 Music, L.A. Underground	
January 24	Gossip	Standing in the Way of Control	Indie rock, garage rock, dance-rock	Back Yard, Kill Rock Stars	
January 24	His Name Is Alive	Detrola		Silver Mountain Media Group, Sony BMG	
January 24	Jenny Lewis and The Watson Twins	Rabbit Fur Coat	Americana, country folk, gospel	Team Love	
January 24	Josh Turner	Your Man	Country	MCA Nashville	
January 24	Nocturnal Rites	Grand Illusion	Power metal	Century Media	
January 24	P.O.D.	Testify	Nu metal, Christian metal, rap rock	Atlantic	
January 24	Portugal. The Man	Waiter: "You Vultures!"	Math rock, emo, indie rock	Fearless	
January 24	Robert Pollard	From a Compound Eye	Indie rock	Merge	
January 24	Rocky Votolato	Makers	Indie	Barsuk	
January 24	Some Girls	Heaven's Pregnant Teens	Mathcore, hardcore punk	Epitaph	
January 24	Tortoise and Bonnie "Prince" Billy	The Brave and the Bold		Overcoat	
January 24	Yellowcard	Lights and Sounds	Alternative rock, pop-punk, pop rock	Capitol	
January 26	Duncan Sheik	White Limousine		Zoë	
January 31	Andrea Bocelli	Amore	Classical, pop	Sugar Records, Universal, Decca	
January 31	Barry Manilow	The Greatest Songs of the Fifties	Easy listening, pop	Arista	
January 31	The Devin Townsend Band	Synchestra	Progressive metal, progressive rock, heavy metal	HevyDevy	
January 31	Heather Headley	In My Mind	R&B	RCA	
January 31	Jamey Johnson	The Dollar	Country	BNA	
January 31	Lilys	Everything Wrong Is Imaginary	Alternative rock	Manifesto	
January 31	P.O.S	Audition	Hip-hop	Rhymesayers Entertainment	
January 31	She Wants Revenge	She Wants Revenge	Post-punk revival, dark wave, gothic rock	Perfect Kiss, Geffen, Flawless	
January 31	Train	For Me, It's You	Rock, roots rock, pop rock	Columbia	
January 31	Vakill	Worst Fears Confirmed	Hip-hop	Molemen Records	
January 31	Wanda Jackson	I Remember Elvis	Rock and roll, pop rock	Goldenlane	

=== February ===
List of albums released in February 2006
Go to: January | February | March | April | May | June | July | August | September | October | November | December | Back to top
Release date	Artist	Album	Genre	Label	Ref.
February 3	In Flames	Come Clarity	Melodic death metal, alternative metal, heavy metal	Ferret, Nuclear Blast, Toy's Factory	
February 4	The Living End	State of Emergency	Punk rock, rock, punkabilly	EMI, Adeline	
February 5	Sway DaSafo	This Is My Demo	Hip-hop, R&B	All City Music	
February 6	Belle and Sebastian	The Life Pursuit	Indie pop, R&B, glam rock	Rough Trade, Matador	
February 6	Prefuse 73	Security Screenings	Electronic	Warp	
February 6	Sparks	Hello Young Lovers	Art pop, art rock, chamber pop	In the Red, Gut	
February 6	Tiga	Sexor	House	Different	
February 7	Aceyalone with RJD2	Magnificent City	Hip-hop	Decon, Project Blowed	
February 7	Beth Orton	Comfort of Strangers	Folk	Astralwerks, EMI	
February 7	Deadboy & the Elephantmen	We Are Night Sky	Blues rock, punk blues	Fat Possum	
February 7	Decapitated	Organic Hallucinosis	Technical death metal	Earache, Teichiku, Soyuz Music	
February 7	Dem Franchize Boyz	On Top of Our Game	Southern hip-hop, crunk, snap	So So Def, Virgin	
February 7	J Dilla	Donuts	Instrumental hip-hop, alternative hip-hop, plunderphonics	Stones Throw	
February 7	Jack Johnson and Friends	Sing-A-Longs and Lullabies for the Film Curious George	Folk rock, soft rock, pop	Brushfire, Universal	
February 7	Kelley Stoltz	Below the Branches		Sub Pop	
February 7	The Minus 5	The Minus 5	Rock	Yep Roc	
February 7	Psychic Ills	Dins		The Social Registry	
February 7	Ray Davies	Other People's Lives	Rock	V2	
February 7	Remy Ma	There's Something About Remy: Based on a True Story	Hip-hop	SRC, Terror Squad, Universal	
February 7	Wolves in the Throne Room	Diadem of 12 Stars	Black metal, folk metal	Vendlus	
February 13	Jaheim	Ghetto Classics	R&B	Divine Mill Records, Warner Bros.	
February 13	Sérgio Mendes	Timeless	Samba, hip-hop, neo soul	Concord, will.i.am Music Group	
February 13	Two Gallants	What the Toll Tells	Indie rock, lo-fi	Saddle Creek	
February 14	Matchbook Romance	Voices	Emo, post-hardcore	Epitaph	
February 14	The Sword	Age of Winters	Heavy metal, doom metal, stoner rock	Kemado	
February 14	Toto	Falling in Between	Hard rock, pop rock, progressive rock	Frontiers	
February 15	Amorphis	Eclipse		Nuclear Blast	
February 15	BoA	Outgrow	J-pop	Avex Trax	
February 17	Danko Jones	Sleep Is the Enemy	Hard rock	Aquarius, Bad Taste, Razor & Tie	
February 17	The Knife	Silent Shout	Synth-pop, techno, electronic	Rabid	
February 20	Jel	Soft Money	Hip-hop	Anticon	
February 20	Lee Harding	What's Wrong with This Picture?	Pop-punk, rock	Sony BMG Australia	
February 20	Liars	Drum's Not Dead	Experimental rock, noise rock, post-punk revival	Mute	
February 20	William Orbit	Hello Waveforms	Ambient, electronica	Sanctuary	
February 21	The Derek Trucks Band	Songlines	Blues rock, Southern rock, world fusion	Columbia	
February 21	Destroyer	Destroyer's Rubies	Indie rock, folk rock, jazz	Merge, Acuarela Discos, Rough Trade	
February 21	Dilated Peoples	20/20	Hip-hop	Capitol	
February 21	Folly	Resist Convenience	Hardcore, punk, ska	Triple Crown	
February 21	Janis Ian	Folk Is the New Black	Folk	Cooking Vinyl	
February 21	Kataklysm	In the Arms of Devastation	Death metal, melodic death metal	Nuclear Blast	
February 21	The M's	Future Women		Polyvinyl	
February 21	Man Man	Six Demon Bag	Experimental rock	Ace Fu	
February 21	October Fall	A Season in Hell	Power pop, pop rock	Fueled by Ramen	
February 21	The Product	One Hunid	Southern hip-hop, gangsta rap	Koch, Underground Railroad	
February 21	Shanice	Every Woman Dreams		Imajah Records, PlayTyme Entertainment	
February 21	The Slackers	Peculiar	Ska	Hellcat	
February 21	Willie Nile	Streets of New York	Rock	Reincarnate Music	
February 24	Corinne Bailey Rae	Corinne Bailey Rae	Pop-soul, neo soul, R&B	EMI	
February 27	Darkthrone	The Cult Is Alive	Crust punk, black metal	Peaceville	
February 27	Sondre Lerche	Duper Sessions	Jazz, indie pop	Astralwerks	
February 27	Television Personalities	My Dark Places		Domino	
February 28	Alan Jackson	Precious Memories	Christian country, gospel	Arista Nashville	
February 28	Bruce Springsteen	Hammersmith Odeon, London '75	Rock	Columbia	
February 28	Hank Williams III	Straight to Hell	Country, bluegrass, Western swing	Bruc	
February 28	Hawthorne Heights	If Only You Were Lonely	Emo, pop-punk, post-hardcore	Victory	
February 28	Jessi Colter	Out of the Ashes	Country	Shout! Factory	
February 28	Kid Rock & The Twisted Brown Trucker Band	Live Trucker	Hard rock, rap rock	Top Dog Records, Atlantic	
February 28	Ne-Yo	In My Own Words	R&B	Def Jam, Compound Entertainment	
February 28	Plumb	Chaotic Resolve	Rock, pop, metal	Curb	
February 28	Rhett Miller	The Believer	Pop rock, alternative country	Verve Forecast	
February 28	Shannon Brown	Corn Fed	Country	Warner Bros. Nashville	

=== March ===
List of albums released in March 2006
Go to: January | February | March | April | May | June | July | August | September | October | November | December | Back to top
Release date	Artist	Album	Genre	Label	Ref.
March 3	Lordi	The Arockalypse	Hard rock, heavy metal, shock rock	Sony BMG, Drakkar, The End	
March 4	Pretty Girls Make Graves	Élan Vital	Emo, math rock, punk rock	Matador	
March 5	Cascada	Everytime We Touch	Europop, dance-pop, trance	Zooland Records, Robbins	
March 6	David Gilmour	On an Island	Post-progressive, art rock, baroque pop	EMI, Columbia	
March 6	Delays	You See Colours	Indie rock, pop	Rough Trade	
March 6	Mogwai	Mr Beast	Post-rock	PIAS, Matador	
March 6	Morning Runner	Wilderness Is Paradise Now	Alternative rock	Parlophone, Faith & Hope	
March 6	Mystery Jets	Making Dens		679	
March 6	Stereolab	Fab Four Suture		Duophonic, Too Pure	
March 6	Van Morrison	Pay the Devil	Country	Lost Highway	
March 6	White Rose Movement	Kick	Indie rock, art rock	Independiente	
March 7	Buzzcocks	Flat-Pack Philosophy	Pop-punk	Cooking Vinyl	
March 7	Donald Fagen	Morph the Cat	Jazz rock, jazz-funk	Reprise	
March 7	I Love You but I've Chosen Darkness	Fear Is on Our Side		Secretly Canadian	
March 7	James Hunter	People Gonna Talk	Blue-eyed soul, jazz, blues	Go, Rounder	
March 7	Isobel Campbell and Mark Lanegan	Ballad of the Broken Seas	Folk rock	V2	
March 7	Juvenile	Reality Check	Hip-hop	UTP Records, Atlantic	
March 7	Kris Kristofferson	This Old Road	Country	New West	
March 7	Matisyahu	Youth	Reggae, reggae fusion, hip-hop	JDub, Epic	
March 7	The Lawrence Arms	Oh! Calcutta!	Punk rock	Fat Wreck Chords	
March 7	The Little Willies	The Little Willies	Rock, country	Milking Bull, Parlophone	
March 7	Mudhoney	Under a Billion Suns	Alternative rock	Sub Pop	
March 7	Neko Case	Fox Confessor Brings the Flood	Alternative country	Anti-	
March 7	The Ocean	Aeolian	Sludge metal, progressive metal, extreme metal	Metal Blade	
March 7	The Ohsees	The Cool Death of Island Raiders	Freak folk	Narnack	
March 7	Public Enemy with Paris	Rebirth of a Nation	East Coast hip-hop, political hip-hop	Guerrilla Funk Recordings	
March 7	Ralph Tresvant	Rizz-Wa-Faire	R&B	Xzault	
March 7	Scarface	My Homies Part 2	Hip-hop	Rap-A-Lot	
March 7	Trent Tomlinson	Country Is My Rock	Country	Lyric Street	
March 7	The Weepies	Say I Am You	Indie folk, indie pop	Nettwerk	
March 10	Bal-Sagoth	The Chthonic Chronicles	Symphonic black metal	Nuclear Blast	
March 11	Augie March	Moo, You Bloody Choir	Indie rock, indie pop, indie folk	Sony BMG Australia, Jive	
March 13	Fightstar	Grand Unification	Post-hardcore, alternative rock, alternative metal	Island, Trustkill	
March 13	Gary Numan	Jagged	Industrial rock, dark wave	Cooking Vinyl, Metropolis	
March 13	Graham Coxon	Love Travels at Illegal Speeds	Alternative rock	Parlophone	
March 13	Katatonia	The Great Cold Distance	Doom metal, alternative rock, hard rock	Peaceville	
March 13	Placebo	Meds	Alternative rock	Virgin	
March 14	Capone	Menace 2 Society	Hip-hop	Central Station	
March 14	D.M.C.	Checks Thugs and Rock n Roll	Pop rap, rap rock	Romen Mpire Records, Rags 2 Riches Records	
March 14	E-40	My Ghetto Report Card	Hip-hop, crunk, hyphy	BME, Sick Wid It, Reprise	
March 14	Joe Satriani	Super Colossal	Instrumental rock	Epic	
March 14	NOFX	Never Trust a Hippy	Punk rock	Fat Wreck Chords	
March 14	Sepultura	Dante XXI	Groove metal, thrash metal	SPV, BMG	
March 14	SHeDAISY	Fortuneteller's Melody	Country	Lyric Street	
March 14	Suzi Quatro	Back to the Drive	Rock, folk rock, raga rock	EMI, Liberty, Caroline	
March 14	Various artists	Dave Chappelle's Block Party OST	Progressive hip-hop, neo soul	Geffen	
March 14	Willie Nelson	You Don't Know Me: The Songs of Cindy Walker	Country	Lost Highway	
March 15	Mono	You Are There		Temporary Residence Limited	
March 15	The Sounds	Dying to Say This to You	New wave, post-punk revival	New Line	
March 20	The Church	Uninvited, Like the Clouds	Alternative rock, neo-psychedelia, psychedelic rock	Liberation, Cooking Vinyl	
March 20	Josh Ritter	The Animal Years	Folk rock, Americana	V2	
March 20	The Whitlams	Little Cloud	Pop	Black Yak, Warner Bros.	
March 21	The Appleseed Cast	Peregrine	Emo, indie rock, post-rock	The Militia Group	
March 21	Anti-Flag	For Blood and Empire	Punk rock	RCA	
March 21	Army of the Pharaohs	The Torture Papers	Hip-hop, horrorcore	Babygrande	
March 21	Band of Horses	Everything All the Time	Indie rock	Sub Pop	
March 21	Ben Harper	Both Sides of the Gun		Virgin	
March 21	B.G.	The Heart of tha Streetz, Vol. 2 (I Am What I Am)	Gangsta rap, Southern hip-hop	Chopper City, Koch	
March 21	Black Eyed Peas	Renegotiations: The Remixes		A&M, Interscope, will.i.am Music	
March 21	BoySetsFire	The Misery Index: Notes from the Plague Years	Post-hardcore, melodic hardcore	Equal Vision, Burning Heart	
March 21	Cannibal Corpse	Kill	Death metal	Metal Blade	
March 21	Chicago	Chicago XXX	Rock	Rhino	
March 21	From First to Last	Heroine	Post-hardcore, emo, industrial rock	Epitaph	
March 21	Josh Rouse	Subtítulo	Folk music, indie rock	Nettwerk	
March 21	Kenny Rogers	Water & Bridges	Country	Capitol Nashville	
March 21	Kutless	Hearts of the Innocent	Christian rock, alternative metal, hard rock	BEC	
March 21	Loose Fur	Born Again in the USA		Drag City	
March 21	Mates of State	Bring It Back	Indie pop	Barsuk	
March 21	MC Lars	The Graduate	Alternative hip-hop, nerdcore	Horris, Nettwerk	
March 21	Murs & 9th Wonder	Murray's Revenge	Hip-hop	Record Collection	
March 21	My Chemical Romance	Life on the Murder Scene		Reprise	
March 21	Prince	3121	R&B, funk, rock	NPG, Universal	
March 21	Quasi	When the Going Gets Dark	Indie rock	Touch and Go, Domino Records	
March 21	Rocco DeLuca & The Burden	I Trust You to Kill Me	Rock	Ironworks Music	
March 21	Teddy Geiger	Underage Thinking	Pop rock, alternative rock	Columbia	
March 21	Yakuza	Samsara	Avant-garde metal, progressive metal, alternative metal	Prosthetic	
March 22	Yeah Yeah Yeahs	Show Your Bones	Indie rock, alternative rock, garage punk	Dress Up, Interscope	
March 24	Doro	Warrior Soul	Heavy metal	AFM	
March 24	Oomph!	GlaubeLiebeTod	Neue Deutsche Härte, industrial rock, industrial metal	GUN	
March 27	Be Your Own Pet	Be Your Own Pet	Noise pop, garage punk	XL, Ecstatic Peace!	
March 27	Embrace	This New Day	Alternative rock	Independiente	
March 27	Michael Schenker Group	Tales of Rock'n'Roll	Hard rock, heavy metal	Armageddon Music	
March 27	Venom	Metal Black	Thrash metal, black metal	Castle Communications, Sanctuary	
March 28	Atreyu	A Death-Grip on Yesterday	Metalcore	Victory	
March 28	Ghostface Killah	Fishscale	Hip-hop	Def Jam	
March 28	Margot & the Nuclear So and So's	The Dust of Retreat			
March 28	Rob Zombie	Educated Horses	Industrial metal, alternative metal	Geffen	
March 28	T.I.	King	Southern hip-hop	Grand Hustle, Atlantic	
March 29	The Futureheads	News and Tributes	Post-punk revival	679, Vagrant, StarTime International	
March 29	Marie Serneholt	Enjoy the Ride	Pop, Europop	Sony BMG	
March 31	Chino XL	Poison Pen	Hip-hop	Activate Entertainment	
March 31	Lacuna Coil	Karmacode	Gothic metal, alternative metal, nu metal	Century Media	
March 31	Queensrÿche	Operation: Mindcrime II	Heavy metal, progressive metal	Rhino	
March 31	Summoning	Oath Bound	Atmospheric black metal	Napalm	

== Second quarter ==
=== April ===
List of albums released in April 2006
Go to: January | February | March | April | May | June | July | August | September | October | November | December | Back to top
Release date	Artist	Album	Genre	Label	Ref.
April 1	Hilltop Hoods	The Hard Road	Australian hip-hop	Obese	
April 1	The Vines	Vision Valley	Alternative rock, garage rock revival, post-grunge	EMI, Capitol	
April 3	Erasure	Union Street	Acoustic, country	Mute	
April 3	The Flaming Lips	At War with the Mystics	Dream pop, neo-psychedelia, psychedelic pop	Warner Bros.	
April 3	Killing Joke	Hosannas from the Basements of Hell	Industrial metal, post-punk	Cooking Vinyl	
April 3	Morrissey	Ringleader of the Tormentors	Alternative rock	Sanctuary, Attack	
April 3	Thee More Shallows	Monkey vs. Shark	Indie rock	Monotreme Records, Turn Records	
April 4	Blackmore's Night	The Village Lanterne	Folk rock, neo-Medieval	SPV	
April 4	Blue October	Foiled	Alternative rock	Universal	
April 4	Bubba Sparxxx	The Charm	Hip-hop	Purple Ribbon, Virgin, Capitol, EMI	
April 4	Caliban	The Undying Darkness	Metalcore	Abacus	
April 4	Cassandra Wilson	Cassandra Wilson	Jazz	Blue Note	
April 4	Dead to Fall	The Phoenix Throne	Metalcore	Victory	
April 4	Dog Fashion Disco	Adultery		Rotten Records	
April 4	Jorn	The Duke	Hard rock, heavy metal	AFM, Candlelight	
April 4	Magneta Lane	Dancing with Daggers	Indie rock, pop-punk	Paper Bag	
April 4	Needtobreathe	Daylight	Alternative rock, Christian rock, Southern rock	Atlantic, Sparrow, Lava	
April 4	Pink	I'm Not Dead	Pop	LaFace	
April 4	Rainer Maria	Catastrophe Keeps Us Together	Indie rock	Grunion Records	
April 4	Rascal Flatts	Me and My Gang	Country	Lyric Street	
April 4	Shooter Jennings	Electric Rodeo	Southern rock, hard rock	Universal South	
April 4	Soul Position	Things Go Better with RJ and AL	Hip-hop	Rhymesayers	
April 4	Voxtrot	Mothers, Sisters, Daughters & Wives	Indie pop, indie rock	Cult Hero Records	
April 5	Van Hunt	On the Jungle Floor	R&B, funk, rock	Capitol	
April 10	Aphex Twin	Chosen Lords	Acid techno, IDM	Rephlex	
April 10	Live	Songs from Black Mountain	Alternative rock, post-grunge, hard rock	Epic	
April 10	El Perro del Mar	El Perro del Mar	Pop	Hybris Records, Memphis Industries, The Control Group	
April 10	Pure Reason Revolution	The Dark Third	Progressive rock	Holograph	
April 10	Rihanna	A Girl Like Me	Pop, reggae, R&B	Def Jam	
April 10	The Streets	The Hardest Way to Make an Easy Living	Alternative hip-hop, electronica	Locked On	
April 11	The Black Angels	Passover	Psychedelic rock	Light in the Attic	
April 11	Built to Spill	You in Reverse	Indie rock	Warner Bros.	
April 11	Calexico	Garden Ruin		Quarterstick Records	
April 11	Eagles of Death Metal	Death by Sexy	Garage rock, alternative rock, blues rock	Downtown	
April 11	Edwin McCain	Lost in America	Alternative rock	Vanguard	
April 11	Hit the Lights	This Is a Stick Up... Don't Make It a Murder	Pop-punk	Triple Crown	
April 11	Josephine Foster	A Wolf in Sheep's Clothing	Folk, psychedelic folk	Locust	
April 11	LL Cool J	Todd Smith		Def Jam	
April 11	Punchline	37 Everywhere	Pop-punk	Fueled by Ramen	
April 11	Rookie of the Year	The Goodnight Moon	Emo, indie rock	One Eleven	
April 11	Sam Roberts	Chemical City	Rock, roots rock	Universal	
April 11	Saves the Day	Sound the Alarm	Emo, pop-punk, power pop	Vagrant	
April 11	Shonen Knife	Genki Shock!	Pop-punk	Glue Factory	
April 11	Toby Keith	White Trash with Money	Country	Show Dog Nashville	
April 11	Ugly Duckling	Bang for the Buck	Alternative hip-hop, jazz rap	Fat Beats Records	
April 12	Poets of the Fall	Carnival of Rust	Alternative rock, post-grunge	Insomniac	
April 17	The Charlatans	Simpatico	Alternative rock, reggae rock	Sanctuary	
April 17	Ellen Allien and Apparat	Orchestra of Bubbles	Techno, electronic, IDM	BPitch Control	
April 17	Miss Kittin	A Bugged Out Mix	Dance	Rough Trade, Resist Music, System Recordings	
April 17	The Zutons	Tired of Hanging Around	Northern soul, rock, indie pop	Deltasonic	
April 18	Adrian Belew	Side Three	Rock	Sanctuary	
April 18	Da BackWudz	Wood Work	Southern hip-hop	Rowdy	
April 18	Crime in Stereo	The Troubled Stateside	Melodic hardcore	Nitro	
April 18	The Dresden Dolls	Yes, Virginia...	Dark cabaret	Roadrunner	
April 18	Drive-By Truckers	A Blessing and a Curse		New West	
April 18	Dudley Perkins	Expressions (2012 A.U.)	Hip-hop	Stones Throw	
April 18	The Fiery Furnaces	Bitter Tea	Indie rock, experimental rock, electronic	Fat Possum, Rough Trade	
April 18	Fred Anderson	Timeless, Live at the Velvet Lounge	Jazz	Delmark	
April 18	Gram Rabbit	Cultivation	Indie rock, shoegaze, space rock	Stinky Records	
April 18	Ian Gillan	Gillan's Inn	Hard rock, heavy metal	Immergent	
April 18	The Lovely Feathers	Hind Hind Legs	Indie rock	Equator	
April 18	Mat Kearney	Nothing Left to Lose	Rock, hip-hop, acoustic	Aware, Columbia	
April 18	Matthew Sweet and Susanna Hoffs	Under the Covers, Vol. 1	Rock	Shout! Factory	
April 18	NOFX	Wolves in Wolves' Clothing	Punk rock, melodic hardcore	Fat Wreck Chords	
April 18	Richard Butler	Richard Butler	Indie rock	Koch	
April 18	Sick of It All	Death to Tyrants	Hardcore punk	Abacus	
April 18	Spank Rock	YoYoYoYoYo	Hip-hop, electronic	Big Dada	
April 18	Tokyo Police Club	A Lesson in Crime	Indie rock	Paper Bag	
April 19	Christina Milian	So Amazin'	R&B, hip-hop	Island, Mercury	
April 21	OSI	Free	Progressive rock	Inside Out	
April 21	Scar Symmetry	Pitch Black Progress	Melodic death metal	Nuclear Blast, Dream On Music	
April 21	The Swell Season	The Swell Season	Folk	Overcoat	
April 24	Arctic Monkeys	Who the Fuck Are Arctic Monkeys?		Domino	
April 24	Cult of Luna	Somewhere Along the Highway	Post-metal, sludge metal	Earache	
April 24	Gnarls Barkley	St. Elsewhere	Neo soul, psychedelic rock, psychedelic soul	Downtown, Atlantic, Warner Bros.	
April 24	Mark Knopfler and Emmylou Harris	All the Roadrunning	Country rock, Americana, country folk	Mercury, Universal, Warner Bros.	
April 24	Therapy?	One Cure Fits All	Alternative rock, alternative metal	Spitfire	
April 25	Bruce Springsteen	We Shall Overcome: The Seeger Sessions	Americana, folk	Columbia	
April 25	The Coup	Pick a Bigger Weapon	Hip-hop, rap rock, funk	Epitaph	
April 25	Godsmack	IV	Alternative metal, hard rock, heavy metal	Universal Republic	
April 25	Goo Goo Dolls	Let Love In	Alternative rock, pop rock	Warner Bros.	
April 25	Irma Thomas	After the Rain	Blues, R&B	Rounder	
April 25	MercyMe	Coming Up to Breathe	Christian rock, alternative rock, pop rock	INO	
April 25	Moonspell	Memorial	Gothic metal, melodic death metal, melodic black metal	SPV/Steamhammer	
April 25	Nobody and Mystic Chords of Memory	Tree Colored See	Indie rock	Mush	
April 25	Rock Kills Kid	Are You Nervous?	Alternative rock, indie rock, electronic rock	Reprise, Fearless	
April 25	Secret Machines	Ten Silver Drops	New prog, space rock	Reprise	
April 25	Survivor	Reach	Rock	Frontiers	
April 25	Taking Back Sunday	Louder Now	Alternative rock, emo pop, pop-punk	Warner Bros.	
April 25	Tommy Bolin	Whips and Roses	Rock	Steamhammer/SPV	
April 28	Tool	10,000 Days	Progressive metal, alternative metal	Tool Dissectional, Volcano	

=== May ===
List of albums released in May 2006
Go to: January | February | March | April | May | June | July | August | September | October | November | December | Back to top
Release date	Artist	Album	Genre	Label	Ref.
May 1	Snow Patrol	Eyes Open	Alternative rock, power pop, post-Britpop	Fiction, Polydor, A&M	
May 2	Alejandro Escovedo	The Boxing Mirror	Alternative rock, avant-rock, chicano rock	Back Porch	
May 2	Brian Littrell	Welcome Home	Pop, pop rock, Christian pop	Sony BMG, Reunion	
May 2	Christian McBride	Live at Tonic	Jazz	Ropeadope	
May 2	Dysrhythmia	Barriers and Passages	Progressive rock, math rock	Relapse	
May 2	Enslaved	Ruun	Progressive metal, black metal, Viking metal	Candlelight	
May 2	Gary Moore	Old New Ballads Blues	Blues rock, hard rock	Eagle	
May 2	Gomez	How We Operate	Rock	ATO	
May 2	Jewel	Goodbye Alice in Wonderland	Pop, pop rock, folk	Atlantic, Warner Bros.	
May 2	Ministry	Rio Grande Blood	Industrial metal, thrash metal	13th Planet, Megaforce	
May 2	Mobb Deep	Blood Money	Hip-hop	Infamous, G-Unit, Interscope	
May 2	Neil Young	Living with War	Folk metal	Reprise	
May 2	Pearl Jam	Pearl Jam	Alternative rock, grunge, hard rock	J	
May 2	Silent Civilian	Rebirth of the Temple	Metalcore	Mediaskare	
May 2	Sunset Rubdown	Shut Up I Am Dreaming	Alternative rock	Absolutely Kosher	
May 2	Thursday	A City by the Light Divided	Post-hardcore	Island	
May 5	Red Hot Chili Peppers	Stadium Arcadium	Funk rock, alternative rock	Warner Bros.	
May 8	Dirty Pretty Things	Waterloo to Anywhere	Garage rock revival, post-punk revival	Mercury, Vertigo	
May 8	Hoobastank	Every Man for Himself	Post-grunge, alternative rock	Island	
May 8	Howling Bells	Howling Bells	Indie rock	Bella Union	
May 8	Jolie Holland	Springtime Can Kill You	Alternative country, folk	Anti-	
May 8	Scott Walker	The Drift	Avant-garde, experimental, gothic rock	4AD	
May 9	Against All Authority	The Restoration of Chaos & Order	Ska punk	Hopeless	
May 9	Beirut	Gulag Orkestar	Balkan folk	Ba Da Bing	
May 9	The Black Heart Procession	The Spell	Indie rock	Touch and Go	
May 9	Daedelus	Denies the Day's Demise	Electronic	Mush, Ninja Tune	
May 9	Danielson	Ships	Alternative rock, indie rock, Christian rock	Secretly Canadian	
May 9	Girl Talk	Night Ripper	Mashup	Illegal Art	
May 9	Grandaddy	Just Like the Fambly Cat	Indie rock, indie pop, space pop	V2	
May 9	The Isley Brothers	Baby Makin' Music	R&B	Def Soul Classics	
May 9	Matmos	The Rose Has Teeth in the Mouth of a Beast	Electronic, musique concrète	Matador	
May 9	Nick Lachey	What's Left of Me	Pop rock	Jive, Zomba	
May 9	Paul Simon	Surprise	Soft rock	Warner Bros.	
May 9	Shearwater	Palo Santo	Indie rock	Misra	
May 9	The Stills	Without Feathers	Indie rock	Vice	
May 10	The Poodles	Metal Will Stand Tall	Hard rock, glam metal	Lionheart International	
May 11	Venetian Snares	Cavalcade of Glee and Dadaist Happy Hardcore Pom Poms		Planet Mu	
May 12	Jolin Tsai	Dancing Diva	Pop	EMI, Mars	
May 13	You Am I	Convicts	Rock	Virgin	
May 15	The Beautiful South	Superbi	Alternative rock	Sony BMG	
May 15	Burial	Burial	Dubstep, UK garage, ambient	Hyperdub	
May 15	Phoenix	It's Never Been Like That	Indie pop, garage rock, yacht rock	EMI, Astralwerks, Arts & Crafts	
May 16	Booka Shade	Movements	Electronic, tech house, downtempo	Get Physical Music	
May 16	Cam'ron	Killa Season	Hip-hop	Diplomat, Asylum, Atlantic	
May 16	Eleventyseven	And the Land of Fake Believe	Pop-punk	Flicker	
May 16	E.S.G.	Screwed Up Movement	Southern rap	Sure Shot Recordings	
May 16	Espers	II	Folk, psychedelic folk	Drag City	
May 16	Ignite	Our Darkest Days	Melodic hardcore	Abacus	
May 16	Mason Jennings	Boneclouds	Folk	Glacial Pace	
May 16	The Raconteurs	Broken Boy Soldiers	Alternative rock, garage rock, power pop	Third Man, XL, V2	
May 16	The Twilight Singers	Powder Burns	Indie rock, alternative rock	One Little Indian	
May 19	Anjani	Blue Alert	Jazz	Columbia	
May 19	Vetiver	To Find Me Gone	Folk rock	Dicristina Stair Builders, FatCat	
May 21	Gotye	Like Drawing Blood	Art pop, indie rock, downtempo	Creative Vibes	
May 22	Boy Kill Boy	Civilian	Dance-punk, indie rock, synth rock	Vertigo	
May 22	Hot Chip	The Warning	Electropop, synth-pop	EMI, Astralwerks, DFA	
May 22	Lil Wayne	Dedication 2	Hip-hop	Cash Money, The Aphilliates Music Group	
May 22	Pet Shop Boys	Fundamental	Synth-pop, electronica, disco	Parlophone, Rhino	
May 22	Tunng	Comments of the Inner Chorus	Folk	Full Time Hobby	
May 22	Zero 7	The Garden	Electronica, downtempo, chill-out	Atlantic	
May 23	Alias and Tarsier	Brookland/Oaklyn	Electronica, trip hop	Anticon	
May 23	Angels & Airwaves	We Don't Need to Whisper	Stadium rock, pop rock	Geffen	
May 23	Astronautalis	The Mighty Ocean & Nine Dark Theaters	Hip-hop	Fighting Records	
May 23	Blue Sky Black Death	A Heap of Broken Images		Mush	
May 23	The Classic Crime	Albatross	Alternative rock, pop-punk, indie rock	Tooth & Nail	
May 23	Current 93	Black Ships Ate the Sky	Neofolk	Durtro	
May 23	Damone	Out Here All Night	Pop-punk, power pop, hard rock	Island	
May 23	Def Leppard	Yeah!	Hard rock	Mercury, Island	
May 23	Dixie Chicks	Taking the Long Way	Country, Americana	Open Wide, Columbia Nashville	
May 23	Dub Trio	New Heavy	Dub, Punk rock	ROIR	
May 23	House of Lords	World Upside Down	Hard rock, glam metal	Frontiers	
May 23	Less Than Jake	In with the Out Crowd	Pop-punk, ska punk, pop rock	Sire	
May 23	Michael Bolton	Bolton Swings Sinatra: The Second Time Around	Pop	Concord	
May 23	Mission of Burma	The Obliterati	Post-punk, indie rock	Matador	
May 23	Murder by Death	In Bocca al Lupo		Tent Show	
May 23	Osaka Popstar	Osaka Popstar and the American Legends of Punk	Punk rock	Misfits, Rykodisc	
May 23	Rhonda Vincent	All American Bluegrass Girl	Country, bluegrass	Rounder	
May 23	Vijay Iyer and Rudresh Mahanthappa	Raw Materials	Jazz	Savoy Jazz	
May 23	The Wreckers	Stand Still, Look Pretty	Country	Maverick, Warner Bros. Nashville	
May 23	Yo Gotti	Back 2 da Basics	Hip-hop	TVT	
May 26	Luca Turilli	The Infinite Wonders of Creation	Symphonic power metal	Magic Circle Music, SPV	
May 28	Scritti Politti	White Bread Black Beer	Art pop, avant-garde	Rough Trade, Nonesuch	
May 29	Boards of Canada	Trans Canada Highway	Electronic, ambient, IDM	Warp, music70	
May 29	Celtic Frost	Monotheist	Extreme metal, black metal, doom metal	Century Media	
May 29	Herbert	Scale	Electronic	Studio !K7	
May 29	Orson	Bright Idea	Pop rock, indie rock	Mercury	
May 30	Alien Ant Farm	Up in the Attic	Alternative metal, alternative rock, post-grunge	Universal	
May 30	Amy Millan	Honey from the Tombs	Indie pop, alternative country, bluegrass	Arts & Crafts	
May 30	Asobi Seksu	Citrus	Shoegaze, dream pop	Friendly Fire	
May 30	George Thorogood & The Destroyers	The Hard Stuff	Boogie rock, blues rock	Eagle	
May 30	Les Claypool	Of Whales and Woe	Experimental rock, progressive rock	Prawn Song	
May 30	Peeping Tom	Peeping Tom	Rock, experimental pop, trip hop	Ipecac	
May 30	The Sound of Animals Fighting	Lover, the Lord Has Left Us...	Experimental rock, art rock, ambient	Equal Vision	

=== June ===
List of albums released in June 2006
Go to: January | February | March | April | May | June | July | August | September | October | November | December | Back to top
Release date	Artist	Album	Genre	Label	Ref.
June 1	Eluveitie	Spirit	Folk metal, melodic death metal, Celtic metal	Fear Dark Records	
June 5	Ed Harcourt	The Beautiful Lie	British rock chamber pop	Heavenly	
June 5	The Feeling	Twelve Stops and Home	Power pop, soft rock	Island, Cherrytree Records	
June 5	Frightened Rabbit	Sing the Greys	Indie rock	Hits the Fan, FatCat	
June 5	Oakenfold	A Lively Mind	Electronica, house, trance	Maverick, Perfecto	
June 5	Primal Scream	Riot City Blues	Garage rock, blues rock, roots rock	Columbia	
June 5	The Whitest Boy Alive	Dreams	Indie pop, dream pop	Service	
June 6	AFI	Decemberunderground	Alternative rock, post-hardcore, emo	Interscope	
June 6	Alexi Murdoch	Time Without Consequence	Indie folk, folk rock, contemporary folk	Zero Summer Records	
June 6	As Blood Runs Black	Allegiance	Deathcore, melodic death metal	Mediaskare	
June 6	The Bouncing Souls	The Gold Record	Punk rock, pop-punk, melodic hardcore	Epitaph	
June 6	Camera Obscura	Let's Get Out of This Country	Indie pop, twee pop, baroque pop	Elefant, Merge	
June 6	Cancer Bats	Birthing the Giant	Hardcore punk, metalcore, sludge metal	Distort	
June 6	Cheap Trick	Rockford	Rock, hard rock, power pop	Big3 Records	
June 6	Cracker	Greenland	Alternative rock	Cooking Vinyl	
June 6	Decyfer Down	End of Grey	Christian rock, hard rock, alternative metal	INO	
June 6	Donavon Frankenreiter	Move by Yourself	Rock	Lost Highway	
June 6	Elvis Costello & Allen Toussaint	The River in Reverse	R&B, jazz, soul	Verve Forecast	
June 6	Frank Sinatra Jr.	That Face!	Jazz	Rhino	
June 6	Genghis Tron	Dead Mountain Mouth	Cybergrind, progressive metal, IDM	Crucial Blast, Lovepump United	
June 6	Head Automatica	Popaganda	Power pop	Warner Bros.	
June 6	Hed PE	Back 2 Base X	Nu metal, rap metal, punk rock	Suburban Noize	
June 6	The Hush Sound	Like Vines	Alternative rock, indie rock	Decaydance, Fueled by Ramen	
June 6	Ice Cube	Laugh Now, Cry Later	West Coast hip-hop, gangsta rap, political hip-hop	Lench Mob, Virgin, EMI	
June 6	LeAnn Rimes	Whatever We Wanna	Pop rock, rock	Asylum-Curb, London	
June 6	The New Cars	It's Alive!	New wave, pop rock	Eleven Seven	
June 6	Patent Pending	Save Each Other, the Whales Are Doing Fine	Pop-punk	We Put Out	
June 6	Psapp	The Only Thing I Ever Wanted	Electronica	Domino	
June 6	Red	End of Silence	Christian rock	Essential, Sony BMG	
June 6	Shawnna	Block Music	Dirty rap, R&B	Disturbing tha Peace, Def Jam	
June 6	Smoosh	Free to Stay	Indie rock, pop	Barsuk	
June 6	Various artists	Cars: The Soundtrack	Pop, blues, country	Walt Disney	
June 6	Various artists	Strummin' with the Devil: The Southern Side of Van Halen	Bluegrass, country rock, blues rock	CMH	
June 6	The Wailin' Jennys	Firecracker	Folk	Festival	
June 6	Yung Joc	New Joc City	Southern hip-hop	Bad Boy South, Block, Atlantic	
June 7	Nelly Furtado	Loose	Pop	Interscope, Mosley	
June 9	Glenn Hughes	Music for the Divine	Funk rock, blue-eyed soul, hard rock	Frontiers Music	
June 9	Luca Turilli's Dreamquest	Lost Horizons			
June 10	36 Crazyfists	Rest Inside the Flames	Metalcore, post-hardcore, alternative metal	DRT, Roadrunner	
June 12	Joan As Police Woman	Real Life	Jazz, pop rock	Reveal	
June 12	Keane	Under the Iron Sea	Alternative rock, pop rock, synth-pop	Island	
June 12	Sucioperro	Random Acts of Intimacy		Captains of Industry	
June 13	The Acacia Strain	The Dead Walk	Metalcore, deathcore	Prosthetic	
June 13	Allison Moorer	Getting Somewhere	Country, pop	Sugar Hill	
June 13	Between the Buried and Me	The Anatomy Of		Victory	
June 13	Billy Joel	12 Gardens Live	Rock	Columbia	
June 13	Blaine Larsen	Rockin' You Tonight	Country	BNA, Giantslayer Records	
June 13	Bomb the Music Industry!	Goodbye Cool World!	Ska punk	Quote Unquote	
June 13	Busta Rhymes	The Big Bang	East Coast hip-hop, hardcore hip-hop	Aftermath, Flipmode, Interscope	
June 13	Dave Burrell and Billy Martin	Consequences	Jazz, avant-garde	Amulet Records	
June 13	David Bazan	Fewer Moving Parts	Indie rock	Barsuk	
June 13	Joan Jett & the Blackhearts	Sinner	Hard rock, alternative rock	Blackheart	
June 13	Joshua Radin	We Were Here	Acoustic, folk rock	Columbia	
June 13	KRS-One	Life	Hip-hop	Antagonist Records	
June 13	Mayday Parade	Tales Told by Dead Friends	Emo, pop-punk		
June 13	Mr. Lif	Mo' Mega	Hip-hop	Definitive Jux	
June 13	Regina Spektor	Begin to Hope	Anti-folk, indie pop, chamber pop	Sire	
June 13	The Reyes Brothers (Mellow Man Ace and Sen Dog)	Ghetto Therapy	Hip-hop	Latin Thug Entertainment	
June 13	Sonic Youth	Rather Ripped	Alternative rock	Geffen	
June 13	Three Days Grace	One-X	Alternative rock, alternative metal, post-grunge	Jive	
June 13	Zao	The Fear Is What Keeps Us Here	Metalcore	Ferret	
June 14	Nouvelle Vague	Bande à Part	Easy listening, lounge, bossa nova	Peacefrog	
June 14	Hikaru Utada	Ultra Blue	J-pop, art pop, electronica	EMI Music Japan	
June 16	Metal Church	A Light in the Dark	Heavy metal, thrash metal	SPV/Steamhammer	
June 17	The Butterfly Effect	Imago	Progressive rock, post-grunge, hard rock	Modern Records, Village Roadshow	
June 19	The Automatic	Not Accepted Anywhere	Indie rock, post-punk revival, alternative rock	B-Unique, Polydor, Columbia	
June 19	The Divine Comedy	Victory for the Comic Muse	Orchestral pop	Parlophone	
June 19	Gorgoroth	Ad Majorem Sathanas Gloriam	Black metal	Regain, Candlelight	
June 20	Brightblack Morning Light	Brightblack Morning Light	Dream pop	Matador	
June 20	Cute Is What We Aim For	The Same Old Blood Rush with a New Touch	Pop-punk, power pop, emo pop	Fueled by Ramen	
June 20	Donell Jones	Journey of a Gemini		LaFace	
June 20	Field Mob	Light Poles and Pine Trees	Hip-hop	Disturbing tha Peace, Geffen	
June 20	Frank Black	Fast Man Raider Man	Americana, alternative country, country soul	Back Porch, Cooking Vinyl	
June 20	Front Line Assembly	Artificial Soldier	Industrial music, electro-industrial, drum and bass	Metropolis	
June 20	Guster	Ganging Up on the Sun	Alternative rock	Reprise	
June 20	Madonna	I'm Going to Tell You a Secret	Dance, electronica, pop	Warner Bros., Warner Music Vision	
June 20	Smokey Robinson	Timeless Love	Funk, soul, pop	New Door Records	
June 20	Underoath	Define the Great Line	Metalcore, post-hardcore, emo	Tooth & Nail	
June 26	The Answer	Rise	Hard rock, blues rock	Albert	
June 26	Hammers of Misfortune	The Locust Years	Progressive metal	Cruz del Sur Music	
June 26	Lostprophets	Liberation Transmission	Alternative rock, pop-punk, emo	Visible Noise, Columbia	
June 26	Plan B	Who Needs Actions When You Got Words	Hip-hop	679	
June 27	7L & Esoteric	A New Dope	Hip-hop	Babygrande	
June 27	Billy Talent	Billy Talent II	Alternative rock, punk rock, post-hardcore	Atlantic	
June 27	Catch 22	Permanent Revolution	Ska punk, third-wave ska, melodic hardcore	Victory	
June 27	Cellador	Enter Deception	Power metal	Metal Blade	
June 27	Dashboard Confessional	Dusk and Summer	Arena rock, pop rock, emo	Vagrant	
June 27	Tha Dogg Pound	Cali Iz Active	West Coast hip-hop, gangsta rap, G-funk	Doggy Style, Koch	
June 27	Dr. Octagon	The Return of Dr. Octagon	Alternative hip-hop, underground hip-hop	OCD International	
June 27	Grant-Lee Phillips	Nineteeneighties	Rock, folk	Zoë	
June 27	India Arie	Testimony: Vol. 1, Life & Relationship	R&B	Motown	
June 27	Julie Roberts	Men & Mascara	Country	Mercury Nashville	
June 27	Michael Franks	Rendezvous in Rio	Smooth jazz	Koch	
June 27	Warrant	Born Again	Hard rock, glam metal	Deadline, Cleopatra	
June 28	Puffy AmiYumi	Splurge	Pop, rock	Ki/oon, Tofu	

== Third quarter ==
=== July ===
List of albums released in July 2006
Go to: January | February | March | April | May | June | July | August | September | October | November | December | Back to top
Release date	Artist	Album	Genre	Label	Ref.
July 2	Ziggy Marley	Love Is My Religion	Reggae	Tuff Gong Worldwide, Cooking Vinyl	
July 3	Muse	Black Holes and Revelations	Alternative rock, progressive rock, space rock	Warner Bros., Helium-3	
July 4	The Bronx	The Bronx	Hardcore punk, hard rock	Island Def Jam, White Drugs, Swami	
July 4	Johnny Cash	American V: A Hundred Highways	Folk, folk blues, country	American	
July 4	Keep On Moving	ESG	Electro-funk, R&B, dance-punk	Soul Jazz	
July 4	OOIOO	Taiga		Felicity Records, Polystar, Shock City	
July 4	Rise Against	The Sufferer & the Witness	Melodic hardcore, punk rock	Geffen	
July 5	Andrew W.K.	Close Calls with Brick Walls	Hard rock	Universal	
July 6	TV on the Radio	Return to Cookie Mountain	Art rock, electropunk, experimental	4AD, Interscope, Touch and Go	
July 7	Peaches	Impeach My Bush	Electronic, glam rock	XL	
July 10	Guillemots	Through the Windowpane	Art pop, chamber pop, indie pop	Polydor	
July 10	Thom Yorke	The Eraser	Indie electronic, experimental rock	XL	
July 11	All That Remains	The Fall of Ideals	Melodic metalcore	Prosthetic, Razor & Tie	
July 11	Benevento/Russo Duo	Play Pause Stop	Acid jazz, rock	Butter Problems	
July 11	Butch Walker	The Rise and Fall of Butch Walker and the Let's-Go-Out-Tonites	Alternative rock, pop rock	Epic	
July 11	Cattle Decapitation	Karma.Bloody.Karma	Deathgrind	Metal Blade	
July 11	Cut Chemist	The Audience's Listening	Hip-hop	Warner	
July 11	The Early November	The Mother, the Mechanic, and the Path	Emo, indie rock, acoustic	Drive-Thru	
July 11	The Format	Dog Problems	Indie pop, indie rock, power pop	The Vanity Label	
July 11	From a Second Story Window	Delenda	Progressive metal, mathcore, deathcore	Black Market Activities, Metal Blade	
July 11	John Gorka	Writing in the Margins	Folk	Red House	
July 11	Oneida	Happy New Year	Alternative rock	Jagjaguwar	
July 11	Phish	Phish: Live in Brooklyn	Rock	JEMP	
July 11	Pimp C	Pimpalation	Southern hip-hop, gangsta rap	Rap-A-Lot, Asylum, Atlantic	
July 11	Rhymefest	Blue Collar	Hip-hop	J, Allido	
July 11	Seether	One Cold Night	Post-grunge, acoustic, alternative rock	Wind-up	
July 11	Set Your Goals	Mutiny!	Easycore, pop-punk	Eulogy	
July 11	Soul Asylum	The Silver Lining	Alternative rock	Legacy	
July 11	Strapping Young Lad	The New Black	Extreme metal, industrial metal, progressive metal	Century Media	
July 11	Valient Thorr	Legend of the World	Psychedelic rock, stoner rock, hard rock	Volcom	
July 13	Lily Allen	Alright, Still	Pop, reggae, R&B	Regal	
July 15	Youth Group	Casino Twilight Dogs	Indie rock	Ivy League	
July 17	Ali Farka Touré	Savane	African blues	World Circuit	
July 17	The Awesome Snakes	Venom	Punk rock	Crustacean	
July 17	Billy Ray Cyrus	Wanna Be Your Joe	Country	New Door Records, UM^{e}	
July 17	Funkoars	The Greatest Hits	Hip-hop	Obese	
July 17	Paolo Nutini	These Streets	Pop rock	Atlantic	
July 17	The Pipettes	We Are the Pipettes	Indie pop	Memphis Industries, Cherrytree Records	
July 17	Razorlight	Razorlight	Indie rock, post-punk revival	Mercury, Vertigo	
July 18	Black Stone Cherry	Black Stone Cherry	Hard rock, heavy metal, Southern rock	Roadrunner	
July 18	Boot Camp Clik	The Last Stand	East Coast hip-hop, hardcore hip-hop, underground hip-hop	Duck Down Music	
July 18	Eighteen Visions	Eighteen Visions	Heavy metal, hardcore punk	Epic, Trustkill	
July 18	Eric Church	Sinners Like Me	Country	Capitol Nashville	
July 18	Helmet	Monochrome	Alternative metal	Warcon	
July 18	Los Lonely Boys	Sacred	Chicano rock, roots rock, Tex-Mex	Epic	
July 18	N.O.R.E.	N.O.R.E. y la Familia...Ya Tú Sabe	Reggaeton, East Coast hip-hop	Roc-La-Familia, Island Def Jam	
July 18	Psalm One	The Death of Frequent Flyer	Hip-hop	Rhymesayers	
July 18	The Red Jumpsuit Apparatus	Don't You Fake It	Post-hardcore, emo, pop-punk	Virgin	
July 18	Rodney Atkins	If You're Going Through Hell	Country	Curb	
July 20	Lemon Demon	Dinosaurchestra	Pop	Needlejuice	
July 21	Bearfoot	Follow Me	Bluegrass, Americana	Glacier Records	
July 21	Chrome Division	Doomsday Rock 'n Roll	Biker metal, Hard rock	Nuclear Blast	
July 24	James Dean Bradfield	The Great Western	Rock, power pop	Columbia	
July 24	Lo-Fi-Fnk	Boylife	Electropop	La Vida Locash, Moshi Moshi	
July 24	Venus Hum	The Colors in the Wheel	Electronic, pop	Nettwerk, Mono-Fi Records	
July 25	Edie Brickell & New Bohemians	Stranger Things	Alternative rock, folk rock, Southern rock	Fantasy, Brick Elephant Music	
July 25	Gym Class Heroes	As Cruel as School Children	Alternative rock, alternative hip-hop, rap rock	Fueled by Ramen, Atlantic	
July 25	Jurassic 5	Feedback	Hip-hop	Interscope	
July 25	Landon Pigg	LP	Rock, Indie pop	RCA	
July 25	LeToya	LeToya		Capitol	
July 25	Linda Ronstadt with Ann Savoy	Adieu False Heart	Folk rock, Cajun, acoustic	Vanguard	
July 25	The Long Winters	Putting the Days to Bed	Indie rock	Barsuk	
July 25	Midlake	The Trials of Van Occupanther	Progressive folk	Bella Union	
July 25	New York Dolls	One Day It Will Please Us to Remember Even This	Rock, rock and roll	Roadrunner	
July 25	Pharrell	In My Mind	Hip-hop, R&B	Star Trak, Interscope, Virgin	
July 25	Sammy Hagar & The Waboritas	Livin' It Up!	Rock	Cabo Wabo Music	
July 25	Silversun Pickups	Carnavas	Alternative rock, indie rock, post-punk revival	Dangerbird	
July 25	Tom Petty	Highway Companion	Heartland rock	Warner Bros., American	
July 25	Voivod	Katorz	Heavy metal	The End, Nuclear Blast, Victor	
July 28	Obie Trice	Second Round's on Me	Hip-hop	Shady, Interscope	
July 31	Duels	The Bright Lights and What I Should Have Learned	Glam pop	Nude	

=== August ===
List of albums released in August 2006
Go to: January | February | March | April | May | June | July | August | September | October | November | December | Back to top
Release date	Artist	Album	Genre	Label	Ref.
August 1	DMX	Year of the Dog... Again	Hardcore hip-hop, East Coast hip-hop, gangsta rap	Ruff Ryders, Sony Urban, Columbia	
August 1	Five for Fighting	Two Lights	Alternative rock, soft rock	Aware	
August 1	FM Static	Critically Ashamed	Pop-punk, Christian rock	Tooth & Nail	
August 1	G. Love	Lemonade		Brushfire	
August 1	Jeannie Ortega	No Place Like BKLYN	Hip-hop, R&B, pop	Hollywood	
August 1	The Pink Spiders	Teenage Graffiti	Pop-punk, dance-punk, indie rock	Geffen	
August 1	Powerman 5000	Destroy What You Enjoy	Punk rock	DRT	
August 1	Showbread	Age of Reptiles	Electronic rock, hard rock, pop rock	Tooth & Nail	
August 1	Stone Sour	Come What(ever) May	Alternative metal, post-grunge, hard rock	Roadrunner	
August 7	Fionn Regan	The End of History	Folk	Bella Union, Lost Highway	
August 8	Agallah	You Already Know	Hip-hop	Babygrande	
August 8	Agalloch	Ashes Against the Grain	Post-metal, folk metal, black metal	The End	
August 8	All Shall Perish	The Price of Existence	Deathcore	Nuclear Blast	
August 8	Ani DiFranco	Reprieve	Indie rock, folk rock	Righteous Babe	
August 8	Breaking Benjamin	Phobia	Alternative metal, post-grunge, hard rock	Hollywood	
August 8	Cassie	Cassie	R&B, pop, hip-hop	NextSelection, Bad Boy, Atlantic	
August 8	Comets on Fire	Avatar	Psychedelic rock, indie rock	Sub Pop	
August 8	Daughters	Hell Songs	Mathcore, noise rock	Hydra Head	
August 8	Defari	Street Music	Hip-hop	ABB Records	
August 8	Gatsbys American Dream	Gatsbys American Dream	Progressive rock, indie rock, pop-punk	Fearless	
August 8	Gin Blossoms	Major Lodge Victory	Alternative rock, power pop	Hybrid Recordings	
August 8	Have Heart	The Things We Carry	Hardcore punk, youth crew	Bridge 9	
August 8	Heartless Bastards	All This Time	Blues rock	Fat Possum	
August 8	hellogoodbye	Zombies! Aliens! Vampires! Dinosaurs!	Emo pop, pop-punk, pop	Drive-Thru	
August 8	The Jonbenét	Ugly/Heartless	Post-hardcore, noise rock	Pluto	
August 8	Jonas Brothers	It's About Time	Pop rock, pop-punk	Columbia, INO, Daylight	
August 8	Matthew Friedberger	Winter Women and Holy Ghost Language School	Indie rock	859 Recordings, Thrill Jockey	
August 8	Meg & Dia	Something Real	Indie rock, emo pop	Doghouse Records, Warner Bros.	
August 8	Nina Gordon	Bleeding Heart Graffiti	Rock	Warner Bros.	
August 8	Oh No	Exodus into Unheard Rhythms	Hip-hop	Stones Throw	
August 8	Rick Ross	Port of Miami	Hip-hop	Slip-n-Slide, Def Jam, Poe Boy	
August 8	Slayer	Christ Illusion	Thrash metal	American	
August 8	Todd Snider	The Devil You Know		New Door Records	
August 8	Steve Holy	Brand New Girlfriend	Country	Curb	
August 8	Unearth	III: In the Eyes of Fire	Metalcore	Metal Blade	
August 9	Christina Aguilera	Back to Basics	Pop, R&B	RCA	
August 14	Paris Hilton	Paris	Pop	Warner Bros.	
August 14	Peter Bjorn and John	Writer's Block	Indie pop, indie rock	Wichita, V2, Startime	
August 14	Stacie Orrico	Beautiful Awakening	R&B, pop	Virgin	
August 15	Cham	Ghetto Story	Dancehall, reggae fusion	Roadhouse, Asylum, Atlantic	
August 15	Cherish	Unappreciated	R&B	Sho'nuff Records, Capitol	
August 15	Hot Snakes	Thunder Down Under	Garage punk, post-punk, post-hardcore	Swami	
August 15	Leigh Nash	Blue on Blue	Pop	One Son	
August 15	Lyfe Jennings	The Phoenix	R&B, soul, gospel	Sony Urban Music, Columbia	
August 15	The Panic Channel	One	Alternative rock, post-hardcore	Capitol	
August 15	Trace Adkins	Dangerous Man	Country	Capitol Nashville	
August 21	The Mountain Goats	Get Lonely	Folk rock, indie rock	4AD	
August 21	Walls of Jericho	With Devils Amongst Us All	Metalcore, thrash metal	Trustkill	
August 21	The Young Knives	Voices of Animals and Men	Indie rock, post-punk revival	Transgressive	
August 22	Against Me!	Americans Abroad!!! Against Me!!! Live in London!!!	Punk rock	Fat Wreck Chords	
August 22	Alexisonfire	Crisis	Post-hardcore, melodic hardcore	Distort Entertainment, Vagrant	
August 22	Boys Like Girls	Boys Like Girls	Pop-punk, pop rock, power pop	Columbia, Red	
August 22	Cursive	Happy Hollow	Indie rock	Saddle Creek	
August 22	Danity Kane	Danity Kane		Bad Boy, Atlantic	
August 22	Deicide	The Stench of Redemption	Death metal	Earache	
August 22	The Devil Wears Prada	Dear Love: A Beautiful Discord	Metalcore, Christian metal	Rise	
August 22	DJ Kay Slay and Greg Street	The Champions: North Meets South	Hip-hop	Koch	
August 22	Easy Star All-Stars	Radiodread	Reggae, ska, dub	Easy Star	
August 22	Gov't Mule	High & Mighty		ATO	
August 22	The Human Abstract	Nocturne	Progressive metal, metalcore, post-hardcore	Hopeless	
August 22	J Dilla	The Shining	Hip-hop	BBE	
August 22	Junior Boys	So This Is Goodbye	Synth-pop	Domino	
August 22	Kelis	Kelis Was Here	R&B	Jive	
August 22	Lamb of God	Sacrament	Groove metal, thrash metal, melodic death metal	Epic, Prosthetic	
August 22	Layzie Bone	The New Revolution		B-Dub Records	
August 22	Maná	Amar es Combatir	Latin rock, pop rock, dub	WEA Latina	
August 22	Misery Signals	Mirrors	Progressive metalcore	Ferret	
August 22	M. Ward	Post-War	Folk rock	Merge, 4AD	
August 22	Nomeansno	All Roads Lead to Ausfahrt	Punk rock	Wrong Records, AntAcidAudio, Southern	
August 22	Outkast	Idlewild	Hip-hop, swing, Delta blues	LaFace, Jive	
August 22	Pat Green	Cannonball	Country	BNA	
August 22	Terrorizer	Darker Days Ahead	Deathgrind	Century Media	
August 22	The Thermals	The Body, the Blood, the Machine	Indie rock, post-punk revival	Sub Pop	
August 25	Iron Maiden	A Matter of Life and Death	Heavy metal	EMI	
August 26	Jessica Simpson	A Public Affair	Pop, R&B	Epic	
August 28	Charlotte Gainsbourg	5:55	Indie pop, dream pop	Because Music, Atlantic, Vice	
August 28	Heaven Shall Burn	Deaf to Our Prayers	Melodic death metal, metalcore	Century Media	
August 28	Kasabian	Empire	Psychedelic rock, electronic rock, glam rock	RCA	
August 28	Wolf & Cub	Vessels	Psychedelic rock, funk	Dot Dash, 4AD, Remote Control	
August 29	5th Projekt	Circadian	Neo-classical romanticism, nu gaze, progressive rock	Organik Rekords	
August 29	Beenie Man	Undisputed	Dancehall, reggae fusion	Virgin	
August 29	Bob Dylan	Modern Times	Folk rock, blues, rockabilly	Columbia	
August 29	BT	This Binary Universe	Ambient, electronica, glitch	Binary Acoustics, DTS Entertainment	
August 29	Chantal Kreviazuk	Ghost Stories		Sony BMG Canada	
August 29	Darc Mind	Symptomatic of a Greater Ill	Underground hip-hop	Anticon	
August 29	The Dears	Gang of Losers	Indie rock	MapleMusic, Arts & Crafts, Bella Union	
August 29	Dirty Dozen Brass Band	What's Going On	Hip-hop, jazz	Shout! Factory	
August 29	Dream Theater	Score – 20th Anniversary World Tour	Symphonic metal, progressive metal, progressive rock	Rhino Entertainment	
August 29	Gwar	Beyond Hell	Thrash metal, comedy rock	DRT	
August 29	Hatebreed	Supremacy	Metalcore	Roadrunner	
August 29	Jin	100 Grand Jin		Draft Records	
August 29	Kenn Starr	Starr Status	Hip-hop	Halftooth Records	
August 29	Kenny Garrett	Beyond the Wall	Jazz	Nonesuch	
August 29	Method Man	4:21... The Day After	East Coast hip-hop, hardcore hip-hop	Def Jam	
August 29	Motörhead	Kiss of Death	Heavy metal	Steamhammer	
August 29	Old Crow Medicine Show	Big Iron World	Folk, country	Nettwerk	
August 29	Pete Yorn	Nightcrawler	Rock	Columbia	
August 29	Ray LaMontagne	Till the Sun Turns Black	Folk, folk rock	RCA, 14th Floor	
August 29	The Roots	Game Theory	Alternative hip-hop, experimental hip-hop	Def Jam	
August 29	Tanya Stephens	Rebelution	Dancehall, reggae, pop rock	VP, Tarantula	
August 29	Too $hort	Blow the Whistle	Hip-hop, crunk, hyphy	Jive	
August 29	Young Dro	Best Thang Smokin'	Hip-hop	Grand Hustle, Atlantic	
August 31	Beyoncé	B'Day	R&B, funk	Columbia, Music World Entertainment, Sony Urban	

=== September ===
List of albums released in September 2006
Go to: January | February | March | April | May | June | July | August | September | October | November | December | Back to top
Release date	Artist	Album	Genre	Label	Ref.
September 1	Blind Guardian	A Twist in the Myth	Power metal, progressive metal, symphonic metal	Nuclear Blast	
September 1	Jon Oliva's Pain	Maniacal Renderings	Heavy metal	AFM	
September 2	The Drones	Gala Mill	Garage rock, folk rock, punk blues	ATP, Shock	
September 4	Audioslave	Revelations	Hard rock, alternative rock, alternative metal	Epic, Interscope	
September 4	Basement Jaxx	Crazy Itch Radio	House	XL, Astralwerks, Interscope	
September 4	Delain	Lucidity	Symphonic metal	Roadrunner	
September 4	The Hidden Cameras	Awoo	Indie pop	Rough Trade, Arts & Crafts	
September 4	Hybrid	I Choose Noise	Electronic, trip hop, breakbeat	Distinct'ive Breaks	
September 5	C-Murder	The Tru Story: Continued	Gangsta rap, hardcore hip-hop	Koch	
September 5	Grizzly Bear	Yellow House	Indie folk, psychedelic folk	Warp	
September 5	Jars of Clay	Good Monsters	Alternative rock	Essential	
September 5	Wiz Khalifa	Show and Prove	East Coast hip-hop	Rostrum	
September 8	Justin Timberlake	FutureSex/LoveSounds	R&B, dance, art pop	Jive, Zomba	
September 8	Kim Wilde	Never Say Never	Pop rock	EMI	
September 11	The Fratellis	Costello Music	Indie rock, garage rock revival	Fallout, Drop the Gun Recordings	
September 11	Heavens	Patent Pending	Alternative rock, indie rock, gothic rock	Epitaph	
September 11	Jakob	Solace	Post-rock, post-metal	Midium Records, Graveface Records	
September 11	The Matches	Decomposer	Art punk, indie rock, pop-punk	Epitaph	
September 11	Stephanie McIntosh	Tightrope	Pop	Universal	
September 12	Barenaked Ladies	Barenaked Ladies Are Me	Alternative rock	Desperation Records	
September 12	The Black Keys	Magic Potion	Garage rock, blues rock	Nonesuch	
September 12	Black Label Society	Shot to Hell	Heavy metal, Southern metal, hard rock	Roadrunner	
September 12	Bob Seger	Face the Promise	Country rock	Capitol	
September 12	Chris Thile	How to Grow a Woman from the Ground	Bluegrass, progressive bluegrass	Sugar Hill	
September 12	Daz Dillinger	So So Gangsta	West Coast hip-hop	So So Def, Virgin	
September 12	Destroy the Runner	Saints	Metalcore	Solid State	
September 12	Dr. Dog	Takers and Leavers	Psychedelic rock, indie rock	Park the Van	
September 12	Electric Six	Switzerland	Rock	Metropolis	
September 12	Envy	Insomniac Doze	Screamo, post-rock	Temporary Residence Limited, Rock Action	
September 12	Everclear	Welcome to the Drama Club	Rock	Eleven Seven Music	
September 12	Ike Turner	Risin' with the Blues	Blues	Zoho Roots	
September 12	John Mayer	Continuum	Pop rock, blue-eyed soul, soft rock	Aware, Columbia	
September 12	Lionel Richie	Coming Home	Chicano rock, roots rock, Latin rock	Island Def Jam	
September 12	Los Lobos	The Town and the City	R&B	Hollywood	
September 12	Madeleine Peyroux	Half the Perfect World	Vocal jazz	Rounder, Universal	
September 12	The Mars Volta	Amputechture	Progressive rock, experimental rock, psychedelic rock	Gold Standard Laboratories, Universal	
September 12	Mastodon	Blood Mountain	Progressive metal, sludge metal	Warner Bros., Reprise	
September 12	Mouse on Mars	Varcharz	IDM, glitch, drill 'n' bass	Ipecac, Sonig	
September 12	Norma Jean	Redeemer	Metalcore, post-hardcore	Solid State, Century, Abacus	
September 12	Now It's Overhead	Dark Light Daybreak	Indie rock	Saddle Creek	
September 12	Ornette Coleman	Sound Grammar	Free jazz	Sound Grammar	
September 12	Papa Roach	The Paramour Sessions	Nu metal, glam metal, rap metal	Geffen	
September 12	Peter Frampton	Fingerprints	Instrumental rock, blues rock, jazz rock	A&M, Polydor	
September 12	Pigeon John	And the Summertime Pool Party	Hip-hop	Quannum Projects	
September 12	Plain White T's	Every Second Counts	Pop-punk, pop rock, alternative rock	Hollywood, Fearless	
September 12	The Rapture	Pieces of the People We Love	Dance-punk, post-punk revival, alternative dance	Universal Motown, Vertigo	
September 12	Robert Cray	Live from Across the Pond	Blues	Vanguard	
September 12	Shawn Colvin	These Four Walls		Nonesuch	
September 12	Simon Dawes	Carnivore		Record Collection	
September 12	Sugarcult	Lights Out	Alternative rock, pop-punk	Fearless, V2	
September 12	Swollen Members	Black Magic	Hip-hop	Battleaxe	
September 12	Teddybears	Soft Machine	Electronic rock, alternative rock, electropop	Big Beat, Columbia	
September 12	Veruca Salt	IV	Alternative rock, indie rock	Sympathy for the Record Industry	
September 12	Xasthur	Subliminal Genocide	Black metal	Hydra Head, Battle Kommand Records	
September 12	Xiu Xiu	The Air Force	Art rock, experimental, post-punk	5 Rue Christine	
September 12	Yo La Tengo	I Am Not Afraid of You and I Will Beat Your Ass	Indie rock, avant-pop	Matador	
September 13	Fergie	The Dutchess	Pop, hip-hop, R&B	A&M	
September 15	Krokus	Hellraiser		AFM	
September 15	Napalm Death	Smear Campaign	Grindcore, death metal	Century Media	
September 15	Scissor Sisters	Ta-Dah	Glam rock, pop rock	Polydor, Universal Motown	
September 18	Elton John	The Captain & the Kid	Rock	Interscope, Mercury	
September 18	Get Cape. Wear Cape. Fly	The Chronicles of a Bohemian Teenager	Folktronica, folk rock, indie	Atlantic	
September 18	Jean-Benoît Dunckel	Darkel	Alternative rock, electronica	Source Records, Astralwerks	
September 18	Level 42	Retroglide	Rock	W14 Music	
September 18	Paulina Rubio	Ananda	Latin, pop rock, dance	Universal Latino	
September 18	The Stranglers	Suite XVI	Punk rock, post-punk	Liberty, EMI, Coursegood	
September 18	The Veils	Nux Vomica	Gothic rock, indie rock, pop	Rough Trade	
September 18	WarCry	La Quinta Esencia	Power metal	Jaus, Avispa Music	
September 19	Ben Kweller	Ben Kweller	Indie rock	ATO	
September 19	Bone Thugs-n-Harmony	Thug Stories	Hip-hop, gangsta rap, R&B	Mo Thugs Records, ThugLine, Koch	
September 19	Bonnie 'Prince' Billy	The Letting Go	Alternative country, folk rock, indie rock	Drag City	
September 19	Chingy	Hoodstar	Hip-hop	Capitol	
September 19	Clay Aiken	A Thousand Different Ways	Pop	RCA, 19	
September 19	Diana Krall	From This Moment On	Jazz	Verve	
September 19	Diecast	Internal Revolution	Metalcore	Century Media	
September 19	DJ Shadow	The Outsider		Universal Motown, Island	
September 19	Emily Haines & The Soft Skeleton	Knives Don't Have Your Back	Indie pop	Last Gang	
September 19	Fear Before the March of Flames	The Always Open Mouth	Post-hardcore, experimental rock	Equal Vision	
September 19	Indigo Girls	Despite Our Differences	Folk rock	Hollywood	
September 19	Jedi Mind Tricks	Servants in Heaven, Kings in Hell	Underground hip-hop	Babygrande	
September 19	Jesse McCartney	Right Where You Want Me	Pop rock, pop	Hollywood	
September 19	Jonny Lang	Turn Around	Gospel, blue-eyed soul, R&B	A&M	
September 19	Joseph Arthur	Nuclear Daydream	Alternative rock	Lonely Astronaut	
September 19	Kenny Chesney	Live: Live Those Songs Again	Country	BNA	
September 19	Lupe Fiasco	Lupe Fiasco's Food & Liquor	Hip-hop, conscious hip-hop	1st & 15th, Atlantic	
September 19	Mushroomhead	Savior Sorrow	Alternative metal, industrial metal, nu metal	Megaforce	
September 19	New Found Glory	Coming Home	Soft rock, pop-punk, indie pop	Geffen	
September 19	Pere Ubu	Why I Hate Women	Experimental rock	Smog Veil, Glitterhouse	
September 19	Sloan	Never Hear the End of It	Rock, power pop	Sony BMG Canada, Yep Roc, Murderecords	
September 19	Suffocation	Suffocation	Technical death metal	Relapse	
September 20	The Frames	The Cost	Rock	Plateau Records, Anti-	
September 20	Janet Jackson	20 Y.O.	R&B, dance, hip-hop	Virgin	
September 22	Amon Amarth	With Oden on Our Side	Melodic death metal	Metal Blade, Sony BMG	
September 22	Falconer	Northwind	Power metal	Metal Blade	
September 25	Evanescence	The Open Door	Gothic rock, symphonic metal, industrial rock	Wind-up	
September 25	Gallows	Orchestra of Wolves	Hardcore punk, melodic hardcore	In at the Deep End	
September 25	James Yorkston	The Year of the Leopard	Folk	Domino	
September 25	John Lennon	The U.S. vs. John Lennon	Rock	Parlophone, Capitol, EMI	
September 25	Larrikin Love	The Freedom Spark	Indie rock	Infectious Music	
September 25	Paul McCartney	Ecce Cor Meum	Classical	EMI Classics	
September 25	Rhapsody of Fire	Triumph or Agony	Symphonic power metal, neoclassical metal	SPV GmbH	
September 25	Sparklehorse	Dreamt for Light Years in the Belly of a Mountain	Indie rock, alternative rock	Astralwerks, Caroline, Virgin	
September 25	UFO	The Monkey Puzzle	Hard rock, heavy metal	SPV/Steamhammer	
September 25	Wolf	The Black Flame	Heavy metal	Century Media	
September 26	Alan Jackson	Like Red on a Rose	Country, soft rock	Arista Nashville	
September 26	Aly & AJ	Acoustic Hearts of Winter	Christmas, folk-pop, pop rock	Hollywood	
September 26	Amy Grant	Time Again... Amy Grant Live	Gospel	Word	
September 26	Brian & Jenn Johnson	We Believe	Worship | CCM	Bethel Music, Found Records, EMI, Kingsway Music	
September 26	Chris Tomlin	See the Morning	CCM, worship	Sparrow, sixsteps	
September 26	David S. Ware Quartet	BalladWare	Jazz	Thirsty Ear	
September 26	The Dear Hunter	Act I: The Lake South, the River North	Progressive rock, experimental rock, indie rock	Triple Crown	
September 26	Escape the Fate	Dying Is Your Latest Fashion	Emo, post-hardcore, metalcore	Epitaph	
September 26	The Falcon	Unicornography	Rock, punk rock	Red Scare Industries	
September 26	Jerry Lee Lewis	Last Man Standing	Rock and roll, country, blues	Artists First, Shangri-La Music	
September 26	The Lemonheads	The Lemonheads	Punk rock	Vagrant	
September 26	Ludacris	Release Therapy	Hip-hop	Disturbing tha Peace, Def Jam South	
September 26	Mario Vazquez	Mario Vazquez		Arista	
September 26	Medeski Scofield Martin & Wood	Out Louder	Jazz	Indirecto Records	
September 26	mewithoutYou	Brother, Sister	Indie rock, experimental rock	Tooth & Nail, Burnt Toast	
September 26	My Morning Jacket	Okonokos	Rock, psychedelic rock, country	ATO	
September 26	Samiam	Whatever's Got You Down	Punk rock	Hopeless, Burning Heart	
September 26	Saosin	Saosin	Post-hardcore, emo, alternative rock	Capitol	
September 26	Tony Bennett	Duets: An American Classic	Traditional pop	Columbia	
September 26	Vanessa Hudgens	V	Pop, R&B	Hollywood	
September 26	"Weird Al" Yankovic	Straight Outta Lynwood	Comedy, parody	Volcano	
September 26	Wolf Eyes	Human Animal	Noise rock	Sub Pop	
September 27	The Killers	Sam's Town	Alternative rock, indie rock, post-punk revival	Island	
September 30	Jet	Shine On	Hard rock, alternative rock	Atlantic	

== Fourth quarter ==
=== October ===
List of albums released in October 2006
Go to: January | February | March | April | May | June | July | August | September | October | November | December | Back to top
Release date	Artist	Album	Genre	Label	Ref.
October 2	Clark	Body Riddle	IDM	Warp	
October 2	The Datsuns	Smoke & Mirrors	Hard rock, garage rock revival	V2	
October 2	Diana Ross	I Love You	R&B	EMI, Angel	
October 2	Dover	Follow the City Lights	Electropop	Capitol-EMI	
October 2	Panda	Amantes Sunt Amentes	Alternative rock, pop-punk, emo	Movic Records, Warner	
October 2	Sean Lennon	Friendly Fire	Alternative rock	Parlophone, Capitol, EMI	
October 3	Akron/Family	Meek Warrior	Psychedelic folk	Young God	
October 3	Amos Lee	Supply and Demand	Folk rock, neo soul	Blue Note	
October 3	Beach House	Beach House	Dream pop, indie pop, lo-fi	Carpark	
October 3	Beck	The Information	Art pop, alternative rock, trip hop	Interscope	
October 3	Brazil	The Philosophy of Velocity		Immortal	
October 3	Chris Young	Chris Young	Neotraditional country	Arista Nashville	
October 3	The Decemberists	The Crane Wife	Indie rock, folk rock, progressive rock	Capitol, Rough Trade	
October 3	Flying Lotus	1983	Instrumental hip-hop	Plug Research	
October 3	George Strait	It Just Comes Natural	Honky-tonk	MCA Nashville	
October 3	Hall & Oates	Home for Christmas	Rock, Christmas	U-Watch	
October 3	He Is Legend	Suck Out the Poison	Hard rock, alternative metal, metalcore	Solid State, Century Media	
October 3	The Hold Steady	Boys and Girls in America	Indie rock, rock	Vagrant	
October 3	Into Eternity	The Scattering of Ashes	Progressive metal, melodic death metal	Century Media	
October 3	Lindsey Buckingham	Under the Skin	Rock	Reprise	
October 3	Monica	The Makings of Me	R&B	J	
October 3	Pernice Brothers	Live a Little	Indie rock	Ashmont Records	
October 3	Pillar	The Reckoning	Alternative metal, hard rock	Flicker	
October 3	Planes Mistaken for Stars	Mercy	Post-hardcore, heavy metal, emo	Abacus	
October 3	Robin Thicke	The Evolution of Robin Thicke	R&B, soul, funktronica	Star Trak, Interscope	
October 3	Robyn Hitchcock & the Venus 3	Olé! Tarantula	Alternative rock	Yep Roc	
October 3	Sadat X	Black October	Hip-hop	Riverside Drive Records	
October 3	Skillet	Comatose	Alternative metal, Christian metal, Christian rock	Lava, Ardent, Atlantic	
October 3	Sleepy Brown	Mr. Brown	Hip-hop, R&B	Purple Ribbon, Virgin	
October 3	South Park Mexican	When Devils Strike	Chicano rap, gangsta rap, chopped and screwed	Dope House	
October 3	Spitalfield	Better than Knowing Where You Are	Alternative rock	Victory	
October 3	Subtle	For Hero: For Fool	Hip-hop	Lex	
October 3	Trey Anastasio	Bar 17	Rock	Rubber Jungle	
October 3	Twelve Gauge Valentine	Shock Value	Metalcore, Christian metal, Southern metal	Solid State, Tooth & Nail	
October 3	Unk	Beat'n Down Yo Block!	Southern hip-hop	Koch	
October 6	Tim Finn	Imaginary Kingdom	Pop	Capitol	
October 9	Albert Hammond Jr.	Yours to Keep	Indie rock, post-punk revival, garage rock	Rough Trade	
October 9	Hot Club de Paris	Drop It 'til It Pops	Indie rock, math rock	Moshi Moshi	
October 9	My Dying Bride	A Line of Deathless Kings	Doom metal, gothic metal	Peaceville	
October 10	120 Days	120 Days		Smalltown Supersound, Vice	
October 10	Bette Midler	Cool Yule	Christmas	Columbia	
October 10	The Blood Brothers	Young Machetes	Post-hardcore	V2	
October 10	Califone	Roots & Crowns	Post-rock, folk, experimental	Thrill Jockey	
October 10	Cobra Starship	While the City Sleeps, We Rule the Streets	Pop-punk, electropunk, power pop	Fueled by Ramen, Decaydance	
October 10	Cold War Kids	Robbers & Cowards	Indie rock, blues rock	Downtown, V2	
October 10	Fucked Up	Hidden World		Jade Tree	
October 10	The Gothic Archies	The Tragic Treasury: Songs from A Series of Unfortunate Events	Indie pop, goth	Nonesuch	
October 10	Heartland	I Loved Her First	Country	Lofton Creek	
October 10	James Taylor	James Taylor at Christmas	Christmas	Columbia	
October 10	Jay Reatard	Blood Visions	Garage rock, punk rock, garage punk	In the Red, Fat Possum	
October 10	Jimmy Buffett	Take the Weather with You	Country	Mailboat, RCA	
October 10	Joe Lally	There to Here	Indie rock	Dischord	
October 10	k-os	Atlantis: Hymns for Disco	Alternative hip-hop, indie rock	EMI	
October 10	Kenny Lattimore and Chanté Moore	Uncovered/Covered	R&B	LaFace, Verity, Sony BMG	
October 10	Lloyd Banks	Rotten Apple	Hip-hop, East Coast hip-hop	G-Unit, Interscope	
October 10	Melvins	(A) Senile Animal	Sludge metal, stoner rock	Ipecac	
October 10	Robert Pollard	Normal Happiness	Rock, indie rock, pop	Merge	
October 10	Rod Stewart	Still the Same... Great Rock Classics of Our Time	Rock	J	
October 10	Rx Bandits	...And the Battle Begun	Alternative rock, post-hardcore, experimental rock	Mash Down Babylon Records	
October 10	Sammie	Sammie	Pop-rap, R&B	Rowdy	
October 10	Senses Fail	Still Searching	Post-hardcore, emo, screamo	Vagrant	
October 10	Sister Hazel	Absolutely	Southern rock	Adrenaline Records, Wandering Hazel Records	
October 10	A Static Lullaby	A Static Lullaby	Post-hardcore, metalcore, emo	Fearless	
October 10	Sting	Songs from the Labyrinth	Classical, Renaissance	Deutsche Grammophon	
October 10	Trivium	The Crusade	Thrash metal, progressive metal, speed metal	Roadrunner	
October 10	Zion I and the Grouch	Heroes in the City of Dope	Hip-hop	Om	
October 11	Agnes	Stronger	Pop, R&B	Ariola	
October 16	Badly Drawn Boy	Born in the U.K.		EMI, Twisted Nerve, Astralwerks	
October 16	Fishbone	Still Stuck in Your Throat	Ska, punk rock, funk	Ter a Terre, Sound in Color	
October 16	Klaxons	Xan Valleys	New rave, dance-punk, post-punk revival	Modular	
October 16	Squarepusher	Hello Everything	IDM	Warp	
October 16	Tim Hecker	Harmony in Ultraviolet	Ambient, noise, drone	Kranky	
October 17	Annuals	Be He Me	Indie pop	Ace Fu	
October 17	Cradle of Filth	Thornography	Extreme metal	Roadrunner	
October 17	Dierks Bentley	Long Trip Alone	Country	Capitol Nashville	
October 17	Dosh	The Lost Take	Post-rock, instrumental hip-hop	Anticon	
October 17	Fat Jon and Styrofoam	The Same Channel	Hip-hop, indie rock, electronica	Morr Music	
October 17	Frankie J	Priceless		Columbia	
October 17	Glenn Danzig	Black Aria II	Classical, dark ambient	Evilive Records	
October 17	Hi-Tek	Hi-Teknology²: The Chip	Hip-hop	Babygrande	
October 17	JoJo	The High Road	Pop, R&B	Da Family Entertainment, Blackground, Universal	
October 17	Kevin Devine	Put Your Ghost to Rest	Indie rock, indie folk	Capitol, Procrastinate! Music Traitors	
October 17	LCD Soundsystem	45:33	Progressive electronic, disco, funk	Nike+ Sport Music	
October 17	Lonestar	Mountains	Country	BNA	
October 17	Me First and the Gimme Gimmes	Love Their Country	Punk rock	Fat Wreck Chords	
October 17	P. Diddy	Press Play	Hip-hop, club, R&B	Bad Boy, Atlantic	
October 17	Ruben Studdard	The Return	R&B	J, 19	
October 17	Sarah McLachlan	Wintersong	Christmas	Nettwerk, Arista	
October 17	The Tragically Hip	World Container	Alternative rock	Universal	
October 17	Twisted Sister	A Twisted Christmas	Christmas, hard rock, heavy metal	Razor & Tie	
October 17	Various artists	God's Country: George Jones and Friends	Country	Category 5	
October 17	Vince Gill	These Days	Country	MCA Nashville	
October 17	Xzibit	Full Circle	Hip-hop	Open Bar, Koch	
October 18	HammerFall	Threshold	Power metal, heavy metal	Nuclear Blast	
October 20	Eisbrecher	Antikörper	Industrial metal, Neue Deutsche Härte	AFM Records, Dancing Ferret Discs	
October 20	Lucie Silvas	The Same Side	Pop	Mercury	
October 20	Meat Loaf	Bat Out of Hell III: The Monster Is Loose	Hard rock, heavy metal, symphonic rock	Mercury, Virgin	
October 20	Winger	IV	Hard rock, heavy metal, progressive metal	Frontiers	
October 21	Sarah Blasko	What the Sea Wants, the Sea Will Have	Alternative rock	Dew Process	
October 23	My Chemical Romance	The Black Parade	Alternative rock, emo, pop-punk	Reprise	
October 23	Isobel Campbell	Milkwhite Sheets	Folk	V2	
October 23	The Ordinary Boys	How to Get Everything You Ever Wanted in Ten Easy Steps		B-Unique, Polydor	
October 23	Pet Shop Boys	Concrete	Pop	Parlophone	
October 23	Robbie Williams	Rudebox	Dance	Chrysalis	
October 24	The Blow	Paper Television		K	
October 24	Brian Setzer	13		Surfdog	
October 24	Converge	No Heroes	Metalcore, hardcore punk, post-hardcore	Epitaph	
October 24	The Curtains	Calamity		Asthmatic Kitty	
October 24	George Jones and Merle Haggard	Kickin' Out the Footlights...Again	Country	Bandit	
October 24	Jibbs	Jibbs Featuring Jibbs	Hip-hop	Geffen, Interscope	
October 24	John Legend	Once Again	R&B, neo soul	GOOD, Sony Music	
October 24	Johnny and the Moon	Johnny and the Moon	Folk	Kill Devil Hills Records	
October 24	Matt & Kim	Matt & Kim	Indie pop, lo-fi	IHeartComix	
October 24	Montgomery Gentry	Some People Change	Country	Columbia Nashville	
October 24	Paul Stanley	Live to Win	Hard rock, alternative metal	New Door	
October 24	Skid Row	Revolutions per Minute	Heavy metal	SPV/Steamhammer, Victor	
October 24	Smile Empty Soul	Vultures	Alternative metal, post-grunge	Bieler Bros.	
October 24	Sparta	Threes	Alternative rock, post-hardcore, indie rock	Hollywood, Anti-	
October 24	Taylor Swift	Taylor Swift	Country	Big Machine	
October 24	Various artists	Hannah Montana Soundtrack	Pop rock, teen pop, country pop	Walt Disney	
October 24	The Walkmen	"Pussy Cats" Starring the Walkmen	Indie rock	Record Collection	
October 25	Cornelius	Sensuous	Experimental pop	Warner Music Japan	
October 25	Europe	Secret Society	Hard rock	Sanctuary	
October 26	Laibach	Volk	Industrial, neoclassical dark wave	Mute	
October 27	Amy Winehouse	Back to Black	Soul, rhythm and blues, R&B	Island	
October 27	Tarot	Crows Fly Black	Heavy metal	King Foo Entertainment	
October 30	Bring Me the Horizon	Count Your Blessings	Deathcore, melodic death metal, metalcore	Visible Noise, Earache	
October 30	The Haunted	The Dead Eye	Thrash metal, melodic death metal, groove metal	Century Media	
October 30	Juggaknots	Use Your Confusion	Hip-hop	Amalgam Digital	
October 30	Kylesa	Time Will Fuse Its Worth	Sludge metal	Prosthetic	
October 30	Thunder	Robert Johnson's Tombstone	Hard rock, heavy metal	STC Recordings	
October 30	The Who	Endless Wire	Rock	Polydor, Universal Republic	
October 31	A.G.	Get Dirty Radio	Hip-hop	Look Records	
October 31	Aimee Mann	One More Drifter in the Snow	Rock, Christmas	SuperEgo	
October 31	Bad Brains	Live at CBGB 1982	Hardcore punk, reggae	Reggae Lounge	
October 31	Barry Manilow	The Greatest Songs of the Sixties	Easy listening, pop	Arista	
October 31	Birdman & Lil Wayne	Like Father, Like Son	Southern hip-hop, gangsta rap	Cash Money, Universal	
October 31	Burden Brothers	Mercy	Hard rock	Kirtland	
October 31	Copeland	Eat, Sleep, Repeat	Indie rock, alternative rock	The Militia Group, Columbia	
October 31	Craig Morgan	Little Bit of Life	Country	Broken Bow	
October 31	Cross Canadian Ragweed	Back to Tulsa – Live and Loud at Cain's Ballroom	Americana, alternative country, country rock	Universal South	
October 31	Dead Poetic	Vices	Alternative rock, hard rock	Tooth & Nail	
October 31	Deftones	Saturday Night Wrist		Maverick	
October 31	Flashlight Brown	Blue	Bubblegum, pop-punk, pop rock	Union 2112, Warner Canada, Hollywood	
October 31	Flavor Flav	Flavor Flav	Hip-hop	Draytown Records	
October 31	Isis	In the Absence of Truth	Post-metal, progressive rock, experimental rock	Ipecac	
October 31	Jeremy Camp	Beyond Measure	CCM	BEC	
October 31	John Fogerty	The Long Road Home – In Concert	Roots rock, swamp rock, heartland rock	Fantasy	
October 31	Kellie Pickler	Small Town Girl	Country	BNA, 19	
October 31	Kevin Federline	Playing with Fire	Hip-hop	Federline Records, Reincarnate Music	
October 31	Lady Sovereign	Public Warning	Grime, hip-hop, electronica	Def Jam	
October 31	Mickey Avalon	Mickey Avalon	Hip-hop	MySpace	
October 31	Nellie McKay	Pretty Little Head	Pop, rock	Hungry Mouse, SpinART, Rykodisc	
October 31	Newsboys	Go	Christian rock, pop rock	Inpop	
October 31	Pitbull	El Mariel	Hip-hop, crunk, reggaeton	TVT	
October 31	The Prize Fighter Inferno	My Brother's Blood Machine	Folktronica, folk, electronica	Equal Vision	
October 31	Sunn O))) & Boris	Altar	Drone metal, experimental	Southern Lord, Inoxia	
October 31	To Live and Shave in L.A.	Noon and Eternity		Menlo Park Recordings	
October 31	Willie Nelson	Songbird	Alternative country	Lost Highway	

=== November ===
List of albums released in November 2006
Go to: January | February | March | April | May | June | July | August | September | October | November | December | Back to top
Release date	Artist	Album	Genre	Label	Ref.
November 1	Jin	I Promise	East Coast hip-hop	Crafty Plugz	
November 3	Damien Rice	9	Folk rock	14th Floor, Warner Bros.	
November 3	I	Between Two Worlds	Heavy metal, black metal	Nuclear Blast	
November 6	The Evens	Get Evens	Indie rock, punk rock	Dischord	
November 6	The Long Blondes	Someone to Drive You Home	Indie rock	Rough Trade	
November 6	McFly	Motion in the Ocean	Pop-punk, sunshine pop	Island	
November 6	yourcodenameis:milo	Print Is Dead Vol 1	Rock	V2	
November 7	Arsis	United in Regret	Melodic death metal, technical death metal	Willowtip, Candlelight	
November 7	AZ	The Format	East Coast hip-hop	Quiet Money Records	
November 7	Bowling for Soup	The Great Burrito Extortion Case	Pop-punk, alternative rock	Jive, Zomba	
November 7	Foo Fighters	Skin and Bones	Alternative rock, acoustic rock	RCA	
November 7	Frank Sinatra	Sinatra: Vegas	Vocal jazz, traditional pop	Reprise	
November 7	Jim Jones	Hustler's P.O.M.E. (Product of My Environment)	Hip-hop	Diplomat, Koch	
November 7	J. J. Cale & Eric Clapton	The Road to Escondido	Blues, blues rock, Tulsa sound	Duck Records, Reprise	
November 7	Josh Groban	Awake	Operatic pop, classical, classical crossover	143, Reprise	
November 7	Keith Urban	Love, Pain & the Whole Crazy Thing	Country	Capitol Nashville	
November 7	Ludovico Einaudi	Divenire	Contemporary classical	Sony Classical	
November 7	Michael W. Smith	Stand		Reunion	
November 7	Ricky Martin	MTV Unplugged	Latin, pop rock, Latin pop	Columbia, Sony BMG Norte	
November 7	The Slip	Eisenhower	Indie rock, jazz fusion	Bar/None	
November 7	Sugarland	Enjoy the Ride	Country	Mercury Nashville	
November 7	Z-Ro	I'm Still Livin'	Southern hip-hop, gangsta rap	Rap-A-Lot, Atlantic, Asylum	
November 10	All Saints	Studio 1	Pop, R&B	Parlophone	
November 13	+44	When Your Heart Stops Beating	Pop-punk, emo pop, alternative rock	Interscope	
November 13	...And You Will Know Us by the Trail of Dead	So Divided	Alternative rock, progressive rock, baroque pop	Interscope	
November 13	Jarvis Cocker	Jarvis	Alternative rock	Rough Trade	
November 13	Joan Osborne	Pretty Little Stranger	Country, pop	Vanguard, Capitol	
November 14	Akon	Konvicted	R&B, hip-hop, reggae	Konvict Muzik, UpFront, SRC	
November 14	Army of Anyone	Army of Anyone	Rock, hard rock, post-grunge	The Firm Music	
November 14	Dave Burrell	Momentum	Jazz, avant-garde, post-bop	High Two	
November 14	Fat Joe	Me, Myself & I	Hip-hop	Terror Squad, Virgin, Imperial	
November 14	The Game	Doctor's Advocate	West Coast hip-hop, gangsta rap, hardcore hip-hop	Geffen	
November 14	Joanna Newsom	Ys	Progressive folk, indie folk, baroque pop	Drag City	
November 14	Kenny G	I'm in the Mood for Love...The Most Romantic Melodies of All Time	Jazz	Arista	
November 14	Kamelot	One Cold Winter's Night	Symphonic metal, power metal, progressive metal	SPV/Steamhammer	
November 14	Nanci Griffith	Ruby's Torch	Folk, country	Rounder	
November 14	Neil Young and Crazy Horse	Live at the Fillmore East	Garage rock, hard rock, folk rock	Reprise	
November 14	Styx	One with Everything: Styx and the Contemporary Youth Orchestra	Rock, pop	Frontiers	
November 14	Tenacious D	The Pick of Destiny	Comedy rock, hard rock, heavy metal	Epic	
November 14	Yusuf	An Other Cup	Folk rock	Ya, Polydor, Atlantic	
November 15	Devin Townsend	The Hummer	Ambient, noise	HevyDevy	
November 20	The Beatles and George Martin	Love	Rock, mashup, sound collage	Apple, Capitol, Parlophone	
November 20	Loreena McKennitt	An Ancient Muse	World music, folk	Quinlan Road	
November 20	Matt Willis	Don't Let It Go to Waste	Pop rock	Mercury	
November 21	2Pac	Pac's Life	West Coast hip-hop, gangsta rap, R&B	Amaru, Interscope	
November 21	Brand New	The Devil and God Are Raging Inside Me	Emo, alternative rock, art rock	Interscope, Tiny Evil	
November 21	Daughtry	Daughtry	Post-grunge	RCA, 19	
November 21	Il Divo	Siempre	Classical crossover	Syco Music, Columbia	
November 21	Hammock	Raising Your Voice...Trying to Stop an Echo	Ambient, post-rock	Darla	
November 21	Inhale Exhale	The Lost. The Sick. The Sacred.	Christian metalcore	Solid State	
November 21	Jay-Z	Kingdom Come	Hip-hop	Roc-A-Fella, Def Jam	
November 21	Killer Mike	I Pledge Allegiance to the Grind	Hip-hop	Grind Time Official	
November 21	Killswitch Engage	As Daylight Dies	Metalcore, melodic metalcore	Roadrunner	
November 21	Snoop Dogg	Tha Blue Carpet Treatment	West Coast hip-hop, gangsta rap, G-funk	Doggy Style, Geffen	
November 21	Sufjan Stevens	Songs for Christmas	Christmas	Asthmatic Kitty	
November 21	Swan Lake	Beast Moans	Indie rock	Jagjaguwar	
November 23	RBD	Celestial	Latin pop, pop rock, dance-pop	EMI	
November 24	Take That	Beautiful World	Pop rock	Polydor	
November 24	Whitesnake	Live... in the Shadow of the Blues	Hard rock	SPV/Steamhammer, WEA	
November 27	Faithless	To All New Arrivals	Trip hop, electronica	Cheeky Records, Columbia	
November 28	Clipse	Hell Hath No Fury	Hip-hop	Re-Up, Star Trak, Jive	
November 28	Incubus	Light Grenades	Alternative rock	Epic, Immortal	
November 28	Ying Yang Twins	Chemically Imbalanced	Southern hip-hop, crunk	TVT	
November 29	Ayumi Hamasaki	Secret	J-pop, pop rock	Avex Trax	

=== December ===
List of albums released in December 2006
Go to: January | February | March | April | May | June | July | August | September | October | November | December | Back to top
Release date	Artist	Album	Genre	Label	Ref.
December 1	Gwen Stefani	The Sweet Escape	Dance-pop, electropop, hip-hop	Interscope	
December 4	Billy Idol	Happy Holidays	Rock, Christmas	Bodog Music	
December 4	Brooke Fraser	Albertine	Pop, folk	Columbia	
December 4	Emma Bunton	Life in Mono		Universal	
December 4	Mylène Farmer	Avant que l'ombre... à Bercy	Pop, rock	Polydor	
December 4	Various artists	Eminem Presents: The Re-Up	Hardcore hip-hop, gangsta rap, horrorcore	Shady, Interscope	
December 5	Brian McKnight	Ten	R&B, soul	Warner Bros.	
December 5	Ciara	Ciara: The Evolution	R&B	LaFace, Zomba, Sony BMG	
December 5	Drake Bell	It's Only Time	Alternative rock, pop rock	Universal Motown	
December 5	Kutless	Live from Portland	Christian rock, post-grunge, contemporary worship music	BEC	
December 5	Lil Scrappy	Bred 2 Die, Born 2 Live	Hip-hop	Warner Bros., G-Unit South, Reprise	
December 5	Various artists	Dreamgirls: Music from the Motion Picture	Soul, R&B, disco	Music World Entertainment, Columbia	
December 12	Fantasia	Fantasia	R&B	J, 19	
December 12	Ghostface Killah	More Fish	Hip-hop	Def Jam	
December 12	Omarion	21	R&B	Epic, Sony Urban Music	
December 12	Taylor Hicks	Taylor Hicks	Pop, blues rock	Arista	
December 12	Tyrese	Alter Ego	R&B, hip-hop	J	
December 12	Young Jeezy	Thug Motivation 102: The Inspiration	Hip-hop	CTE, Def Jam	
December 18	Trick Daddy	Back by Thug Demand	Southern hip-hop, gangsta rap	Slip-n-Slide, Atlantic	
December 19	Bow Wow	The Price of Fame	Hip-hop	LBW Entertainment, Columbia	
December 19	DJ Clue	The Professional 3	Hip-hop	Desert Storm, Roc-A-Fella, Def Jam	
December 19	Nas	Hip Hop Is Dead	Hip-hop	The Jones Experience, Def Jam, Columbia	
December 19	RBD	Rebels	Teen pop	EMI Music, Virgin	
December 19	Styles P	Time Is Money	Hip-hop	Ruff Ryders, Interscope	
December 19	Various artists	Grand Hustle Presents: In da Streetz Volume 4	Hip-hop	Grand Hustle, Atlantic	
December 26	Matt Redman	Beautiful News	Worship, CCM	Sixsteps	
December 26	Switchfoot	Oh! Gravity.	Art rock, post-punk, power pop	Columbia, Sony BMG	
December 29	Mos Def	True Magic	Alternative hip-hop	Geffen	
