= Kitsuné Maison Compilation 3 =

Compilation album by Kitsuné
- Released: December 11, 2006
- Genre: Electronic; Indie rock
- Label: Kitsuné Musique

Kitsuné chronology
Kitsuné Maison Compilation 2	Kitsuné Maison Compilation 3	Kitsuné Maison Compilation 4

Kitsuné Maison Compilation 3 is the third compilation released by the French label Kitsuné Musique. It was released on 11 December 2006. Pitchfork Media gave the album a mixed 6.0/10 review, describing the tracks by Simian Mobile Disco, Freeform Five and The Whitest Boy Alive as highlights.

== Track listing ==
1. Simian Mobile Disco – "I Believe"
2. The Lovely Feathers – "Frantic"
3. The Whip – "Trash"
4. Fox n' Wolf – "Youth Alcoholic"
5. Klaxons – "Gravity's Rainbow (Van She Remix)"
6. Freeform Five – "Home Wit U"
7. Boys Noize – "Feel Good (TV=Off)"
8. Gossip – "Standing In The Way Of Control (Soulwax Nite Version)"
9. Alex Gopher – "Motorcycle (Wet Clutch Short Edit)"
10. The World Domination vs. Adam Sky – "Galactic Lover"
11. Dead Disco – "The Treatment (Metronomy Remix)"
12. The Valentinos – "Kafka (Bag Raiders What Y'all Kno 'Bout Seven Remix)"
13. Oh No! Oh My! – "I Love You All The Time"
14. The Whitest Boy Alive – "Done With You"
15. Digitalism – "Zdarlight (Paranoid Asteroid Mix)"
