= My Best Friend Daniel =

Studio album by The Lovely Feathers
- Released: September 6, 2004
- Genre: Indie rock
- Label: Equator Records
- Producer: Jimmy Shaw

The Lovely Feathers chronology
My Best Friend Daniel (2004)	Hind Hind Legs (2006)

My Best Friend Daniel is an EP released by Montreal-based indie band The Lovely Feathers on September 6, 2004. The EP features different versions of several songs that appeared on the band's album Hind Hind Legs, as well as other material. It was rereleased by Equator Records on December 12, 2006.

== Track listing ==
1. "Fudgicle"
2. "Iceberg"
3. "Like You"
4. "The Lion Eats the Wildebeest"
5. "Upon Milwaukee's Patio" (Instrumental)
6. "Cadillac Back-Pack"
7. "Orchids"
8. "Photocorners"
9. "The Only Appalachian Cornfield"
10. "Lawrenceville Blazer"
11. "The Bronze"
12. "Force Fire Force"
13. "Wrong Choice"

== Personnel ==
Mark Kupfert - Vocals, Guitar

Richard Yonofsky - Vocals, Guitar

Noah Bernamoff - Bass

Daniel Suss - Keyboard, Vocals

Ted Suss - Drums
