= Motion to Rejoin =

Studio album by Brightblack Morning Light
- Released: September 23, 2008
- Genre: Freak Folk, Jazz
- Length: 49:20
- Label: Matador

Brightblack Morning Light chronology
Brightblack Morning Light (2006)	Motion to Rejoin (2008)

Professional ratings
Review scores
Source	Rating
AllMusic	3/5 stars
The A.V. Club	(B+)
The Big Issue	4/5 stars
Pitchfork	(8.3/10)

Motion to Rejoin is the second full-length album by Brightblack Morning Light. It was released on September 23, 2008 by Matador Records.

== Track listing ==
1. "Introduction" – 0:42
2. "Hologram Buffalo" – 5:18
3. "Gathered Years" – 8:00
4. "Oppressions Each" – 3:26
5. "Another Reclamation" – 7:05
6. "A Rainbow Aims" – 9:46
7. "Summer Hoof" – 5:27
8. "Past a Weatherbeaten Fencepost" – 6:49
9. "When Beads Spell Power Leaf" – 2:43
