= Circadian (5th Projekt album) =

Studio album by 5th Projekt
- Released: August 29, 2006
- Recorded: May–November 2005 at Chemical Sound in Toronto, Ontario
- Genres: Neo-classical romanticism, nu gaze, progressive rock, psychedelic rock, indie rock, art rock, indie folk, ambient
- Length: 62:09
- Label: Organik Rekords (Independent)
- Producer: 5th Projekt

Circadian is a concept album and the first full-length studio album by 5th Projekt. It was released on August 29, 2006, on 5th Projekt's Organik Rekords. It explores the metaphysical relationship of humanity as it coexists with its environment and the cycles of which both partake and create. Music and lyrics were written by Tara Rice and/or Sködt D. McNalty.

== Album concept ==
Circadian resulted from an interest in the effects of cycles and in the ways human individual rhythms interact with nature. It was produced by 5th Projekt, recorded from May–November 2005 at Toronto's Chemical Sound with James Heidebrecht, mixed by Ken Andrews (formerly of the band Failure), and mastered by Juno nominee João Carvalho, the album takes on the themes of balance and discovery.

The journey begins "In a Coma", "inspired by Yevgeny Zamyatin's 1924 novel We, a precursor to dystopian classics as Brave New World and Nineteen Eighty-Four. The opening piece sets the pace for the dreamlike lyrical exploration and the atmospheric compositions that characterize the album.

In "One to Throw Away", the central theme of disdain for the blatant disregard of ecosystems, both within ourselves and in the world around us, comes to light while the music paints a backdrop of darkness.

== Artwork ==
The CD album was hand packaged in circular aluminum tins reminiscent of old cinema reel canisters, symbolic for the bands' cinematic sound and also for the conceptual approach to infinite cycles as they are influenced by the heavenly orbs of the sun and moon. The lid of the tin displays an ambigram of the title "Circadian", further emphasizing the predominant themes of unity and balance. Reinforcing these themes, the liner notes are also bound in a circular booklet depicting a clear glossed graphic interpretation of an eclipse on the front and back covers. The CD album face is silkscreened in an homage to the vinyl 45s that were instrumental in leading each member to fall in love with music as young children, and complete the cycle by becoming the music maker later in their lives.

== Track listing ==
1. "Las Ventanas" (5th Projekt) – 1:19
2. "In a Coma..." (McNalty) – 6:50
3. "Oblivion" (Rice) – 5:40
4. "Glockenspiel" (Rice) – 1:35
5. "Distracktiid" (Rice & McNalty) – 4:47
6. "Madness" (Rice) – 4:40
7. "Spiders" (McNalty) – 6:19
8. "Skepticosm" (Rice) – 4:23
9. "tToDQ" (McNalty) – 1:58
10. "One to Throw Away" (Rice) – 8:33
11. "3ight Word5" (McNalty) – 5:48
12. "Gna Gna" (McNalty) – 1:17
13. "Broken Like This" (Rice) – 3:08
14. "Resistance" (Rice & McNalty) – 5:31

== Singles ==
- "Broken Like This" -Track 12 – 3:08
- "In a Coma..." -Track 01 – 6:50

== Videos ==
- "Broken Like This" – In the spring of 2007, "Broken Like This" was entered in the Universal Music Canada & Yahoo! Canada Up Your music video contest where it placed in the top ten.

== Charting ==
| Country | Chart (2006) | Peak position |
|---|---|---|
| Canada | !earshot Top 200 | 93 |

== Personnel on all cuts ==
- Tara Rice – Voice, Words, Electric, Acoustic & Classical Guitar, Glockenspiel, Keyboards, Programming
- Sködt D. McNalty – Electric, Acoustic, Backwards & Bowed Guitar, Voice, Words, Field Recordings, Keyboards, Programming, E-Bow, Gna Gna, Glockenspiel, Wood Blocks, Pint GlassProgramming, Percussion, Glockenspiel, Gna Gna
- Peter Broadley – Bass Guitar
- Nathan Kaye – Acoustic & Electronic Drums, Djembe, Shakers, Tambourine, Cabasa,

with

- Melanie Knight – Vocals on "Las Ventanas", "Skepticosm", "3ight Word5", "Broken Like This", "Resistance"
- James Heidebrecht – Backwards Piano & Backwards Guitar on "Broken Like This"

Additional Personnel:

- Engineered by James Heidebrecht
- Mixed by Ken Andrews
- Mastered by João Carvalho
- Produced by 5th Projekt – "Broken Like This" co-produced by James Heidebrecht
- Kreative Direktion & Design by strange//attraktor:
