= White Rose Movement =

Post-punk/electro band from London, England

- Origin: London, England
- Genres: Post-punk, electro
- Years active: 2004–2010
- Label: Independiente
- Past members: Finn Vine (vocals); Jasper Milton (guitar); Owen Dyke (bass); Poppy Corby-Tuech (keyboard); Edward Harper (drums); Erica MacArthur (keyboards)

White Rose Movement are a post-punk/electro band from London, England. The band was named after the German anti-Nazi resistance movement White Rose. They mixed the post-punk style and attitude of early bands of the genre such as Joy Division, the Sound, Killing Joke and the Chameleons.

== History ==
White Rose Movement was formed from an earlier group named Arturo. Vine, Milton, Dyke and Harper were childhood friends who grew up together in a hippy commune in a small village in Norfolk. Erica MacArthur (known as "Taxxi") joined the band when Owen Dyke went throughout the London club Trash asking every girl whether they played keyboards. The band once ran a club in London named The Dazzle!, which was situated in a venue used as a disco by the national front. Their first album Kick was released 17 April 2006, after a long period of media hype and critical acclaim from the British indie music press. Its single "Love Is a Number", hailed by many as the soundtrack of the year (including Conor McNicholas, editor of the NME and Kele from Bloc Party who described it as "the song I wished I'd written") - an eclectic fusion of electronics and bass driven guitars, divided the critics, both impressing and confusing them. Kick was produced by British producer Paul Epworth. The band toured with the Rakes across January and February 2006, supported the Strokes at Hammersmith Apollo on 17 February, and embarked on a headline tour of their own in March.

Also in 2006, they played at the Coachella festival in California, Festival Paredes de Coura (Portugal) and Festival Internacional de Benicàssim near Barcelona, as well as two tours supporting Placebo and other festivals. The band were due to embark on a headline tour of the UK in September, but due to Vine being ill they were forced to postpone this tour to November/December of that year.

The band were the support act for Nine Inch Nails (Australia), Placebo, Bloc Party, the Strokes, Gary Numan, Soulwax, the Kills, and in 2007 they last played London at their own self-styled 'Dazzle Club', followed by DJ sets from the Kills and Jesus and Mary Chain. After that, White Rose Movement were to begin recording a second album.

On 15 April 2008, the band announced Taxxi's departure and replacement by Poppy Corby-Tuech, with Taxxi confirming on her personal blog that she had departed the band in January. Work began on the new album as they said farewell to Taxxi and embraced Poppy into the fold, a distant relative of Finn's, whose presence provided a final unifying link for the band, all brought together by friendship or family connections.

In 2008, the band made their foray into Eastern Europe territory with gigs in Moscow, St. Petersburg and Ukraine where they headlined a festival in front of 33,000 people. Despite the fact that their first album was never released outside the UK, with the help of the Internet, the band amassed a fanbase and toured extensively throughout the world. Their US tours included gigs at Coachella, South X South West and the Bowery Ballroom, selling out the NY club before they had even arrived in the States. Tours also led them through most of Europe, including France, Spain, Italy, Germany, Turkey, Belgium and the recent visit to Eastern Europe and Asia.

Having landed a publishing deal with Domino, the band were due to return with a self-financed second album but split up citing on their website that "we were lucky enough to release our first album which we are all proud of, unfortunately, the second has proved more difficult. Although it has been finished for some time, we have faced many brick walls and without the relevant support, it has proved a struggle to sort its final flight into the public domain. It's an album that we have spent much time compiling and we hope that you'll get to hear it somehow so that your waiting has not been in vain." White Rose Movement has recently posted the re-release of their 2009 Single "Cigarette Machine" which featured in the cult EA Sports Game "Skate 3". They have been actively engaging with fans on Instagram and Facebook and have promised to release the finished version of their second album in the not-too-distant future.

== Discography ==
=== Albums ===
- Kick (CD/digipak CD/LP) (2006) - UK #106

=== Singles ===
- "Love Is a Number" (CD/7") (2005) - UK #117
- "Alsatian" (CD/7") (2005) - UK #54
- "Girls in the Back" (CD/7") (2006) - UK #77
- "London's Mine/Testcard Girl" (CD/7") (2006) - UK #96
- "Love Is a Number" (re-release) (2x7") (2006) - UK #136
- "Small and the Witches Revenge/Cigarette Machine" (12", limited) (2009)
- "The Stairs" (2009)
- "Cigarette Machine/Small and the Witches Revenge (2026)

=== Videos ===
- "Love Is a Number" (2005)
- "Alsatian" (2005)
- "Girls in the Back" (2006)
- "Love Is a Number" [Version 2] (2006)
- "Bones" (2009)
- "Small and the Witches Revenge" (2009)
