= Boylife =

Studio album by Lo-Fi-Fnk
- Released: July 24, 2006
- Genre: Electropop
- Length: 36:15
- Labels: La Vida Locash, Moshi Moshi Records
- Producer: Lo-Fi-Fnk

Lo-Fi-Fnk chronology
Boylife (2006)	The Last Summer (2011)

Professional ratings
Review scores
Source	Rating
The Guardian	2/5 stars
Stylus Magazine	B+
XLR8R	favorable

Boylife is the debut album by Lo-Fi-Fnk, released on July 24, 2006. According to the band this is "An eleven track story about being young for too long." "Reminds you a bit of that feeling you got when you heard Daft Punk for the first time. Disco without a thought of a tomorrow..."

== Track listing ==
No.	Title	Length
1.	"Boylife Intro"	0:24
2.	"City"	3:44
3.	"Adore"	3:40
4.	"Wake Up"	3:53
5.	"System" (featuring Maiden)	3:00
6.	"What's on Your Mind?"	4:12
7.	"Change Channel"	3:20
8.	"Steppin' Out"	3:55
9.	"Heartache"	3:06
10.	"Boylife"	2:50
11.	"The End"	4:12
