= 120 Days =

Norwegian rock band

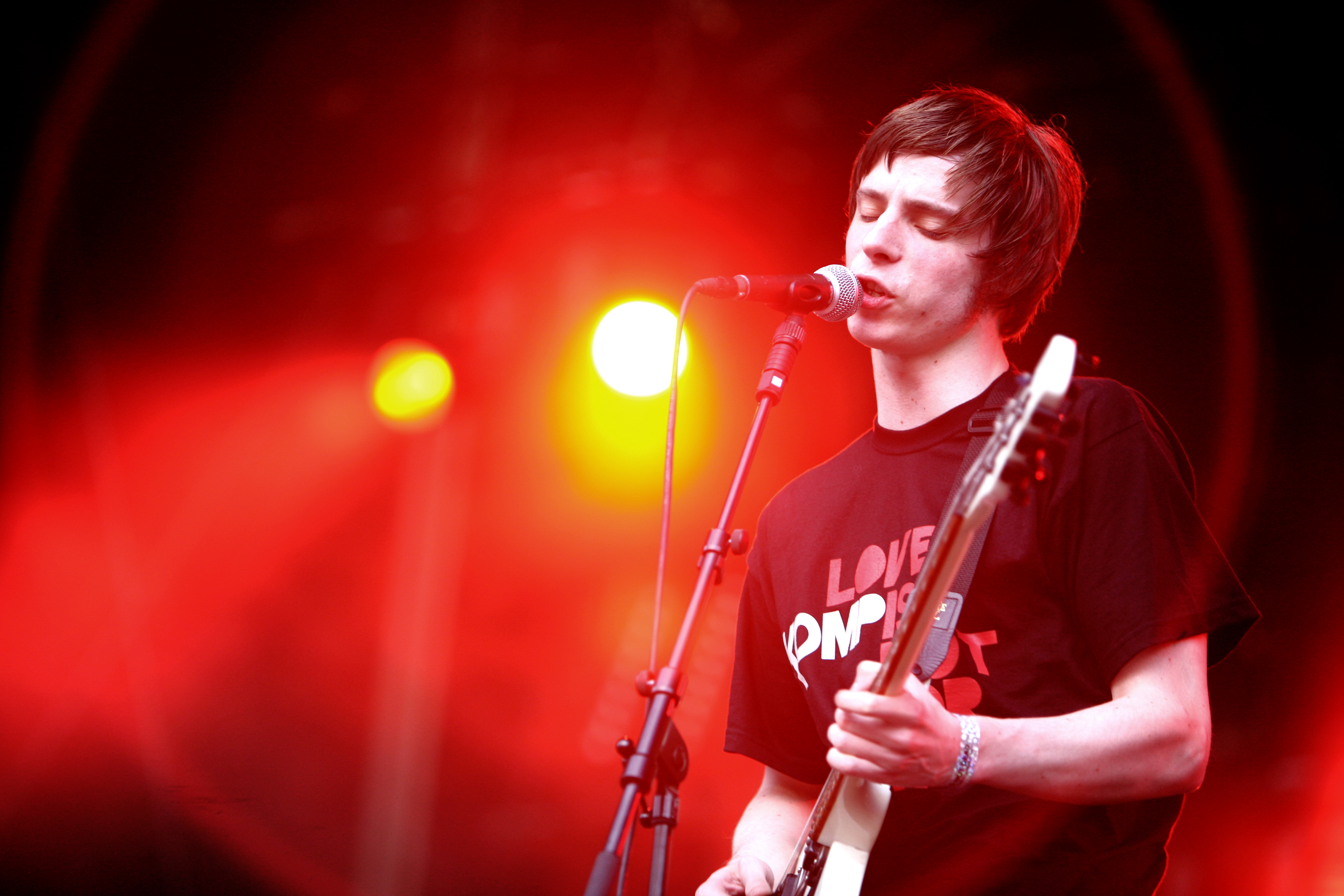
- Ådne Meisfjord live with 120 Days in 2007.

Background information
- Origin: Kristiansund, Norway
- Genres: Rock; Electro; Experimental
- Years active: 2001–2012
- Labels: Vice Recordings; Smalltown Supersound; Voices Of Wonder
- Members: Ådne Meisfjord; Kjetil Ovesen; Jonas Hestvik Dahl; Arne Kvalvik

120 Days was a Norwegian rock band.

== Biography ==
The band comprises Jonas Dahl, Arne Kvalvik, Kjetil Ovesen, and Ådne Meisfjord, and was formed in Kristiansund in 2001 under the name The Beautiful People. When they changed their name, they took the new name from the Marquis De Sade's 120 Days Of Sodom. Originally based in Kristiansund, they moved to Oslo in 2002. After two EPs on the Public Demand label, the group signed to the Norwegian independent label Smalltown Supersound. Their first album, 120 Days, was released on 10 October 2006, and had several positive reviews in North American publications. The group toured the United States shortly after the album's release. 120 started producing new material for a record after returning to Oslo in 2008, following major touring around the United States and Europe. On 7 June 2012, 120 Days announced that the band would end by September that year. The band had played together for almost 11 years before announcing the last concert in September 2012.

== Band members ==
- Ådne Meisfjord - vocals and guitar
- Kjetil Ovesen - keyboards
- Jonas Hestvik Dahl - bass guitar
- Arne Kvalvik - drums

== Honors ==
- 2006: Two times Spellemannprisen in the categories best Rock band and Newcomer, for the album 120 Days

== Discography ==
EPs

- 2003: The Beautiful People (Perfect Pop Records)
- 2004: Sedated Times (Perfect Pop Records)

Albums

- 2006: 120 Days (Smalltown Supersound (Norway), Vice records (US) and Traffic (Japan))
- 2011: 120 Days II (Voices Of Wonder, Splendour)

Awards
Preceded by Madrugada	Recipient of the Rock Spellemannprisen; 2006	Succeeded by My Midnight Creeps
Preceded by Marthe Valle	Recipient of the Newcomer Spellemannprisen; 2006	Succeeded by Tine Thing Helseth
