= Brightblack Morning Light (album) =

Studio album by Brightblack Morning Light
- Released: June 20, 2006
- Genre: Dream pop
- Length: 52:49
- Label: Matador

Brightblack Morning Light chronology
Ala.Cali.Tucky (2004)	Brightblack Morning Light (2006)	Motion to Rejoin (2008)

Brightblack Morning Light is the first studio album by American musical group Brightblack Morning Light. The album was released on June 20, 2006, by Matador Records.

== Critical reception ==
Professional ratings
Aggregate scores
Source	Rating
Metacritic	73/100
Review scores
Source	Rating
AllMusic	3.5/5 stars
Alternative Press	3/5
The A.V. Club	B
Blender	3.5/5 stars
Mojo	4/5 stars
Pitchfork	8.2/10
Q	3/5 stars
The Skinny	4/5 stars
Spin	1/5 stars
Uncut	4/5 stars

Brightblack Morning Light was named the 36th best album of 2006 by Pitchfork. In 2018, Pitchfork listed it at number 23 on its list of the 30 best dream pop albums.

== Track listing ==
All lyrics are written by Nathan D. Shineywater.

No.	Title	Length
1.	"Everybody Daylight"	6:01
2.	"Miwok Shapes" (exclusive to vinyl edition)	5:49
3.	"Friend of Time"	6:30
4.	"Fry Bread"	1:46
5.	"Star Blanket River Child"	10:29
6.	"All We Have Broken Shines"	5:06
7.	"A River Could Be Loved"	4:03
8.	"Amber Canyon Magik"	4:54
9.	"Black Feather Wishes Rise"	5:05
10.	"Come Another Rain Down"	3:16
11.	"We Share Our Blanket with the Owl"	5:39

== Personnel ==
Brightblack Morning Light

- Rachael A. Hughes – vocals, organ, piano, mixing
- Nathan D. Shineywater – vocals, guitar, bells, congas, mixing

Additional personnel

- Ray Agee – trombone
- Tauba Auerbach – lettering
- Robbie Lee – flute
- Paz Lenchantin – bass, piano
- Magic Andy MacLeod – cymbals, engineering, photography, trap kit
- Ann McCrary – harmony
- Thom Monahan – engineering, mixing
- Mark Nevers – engineering
- Aaron Novik – clarinet
- Andrew Paynter – photography
- Elias Reitz – percussion, conga, tabla, bells, gourd, mouth hat
- A. Gail West – harmony
