= LP (Landon Pigg album) =

Studio album by Landon Pigg
- Released: July 25, 2006
- Recorded: EMAC Recording Studios
- Genre: Rock, indie pop
- Length: 46:30
- Label: RCA
- Producer: Dan Brodbeck, Paul Ebersold, Clif Magness

Landon Pigg chronology
Demonstration (2002)	LP (2006)	The Boy Who Never (2009)

Professional ratings
Review scores
Source	Rating
AllMusic	link

LP is a 2006 album by American singer-songwriter Landon Pigg.

== Track listing ==
- All songs written by Landon Pigg, except "Perfectionist" (Magness/Pigg).
1. "Can't Let Go"–3:58
2. "Last Stop"–3:37
3. "Just Like I Am"–3:16
4. "Eggshells"–3:44
5. "Keep Looking Up"–4:09
6. "Trickery"–4:05
7. "Magnetism"–3:21
8. "Sailed On"–4:19
9. "Great Companion"–4:15
10. "Perfectionist"–4:18
11. "Tin Man"–3:47
12. "On the Other Side"–3:41

== Album credits ==
- Clif Magness: Bass, Piano, Guitar (Electric), Programming, Engineer, Producer, Keyboards
- Gary Pigg: Vocals (Background), Whistle (Human)
- Tim Roberts: Mixing Assistant
- Patrick Warren: Synthesizer, Tack Piano, Wurlitzer, Chamberlain
- Serban Ghenea: Mixing
- Joey Waronker: Drums
- Landon Pigg: Guitar (Acoustic), Guitar, Guitar (Electric), Piano, Vocals
- Dan Brodbeck: Bass, Guitar (Electric), engineer, producer, Keyboards
- Corey Thompson: Drums
- Ryan Truso: Guitar, Bass
- Gabe Pigg: Vocals (Background)
- Grant Taylor: Drums
- Abe Laboriel Jr.: Drums
- Scott Hardin: Engineer
- Stephen Ferrera: A&R
- Matt Chamberlain: Drums
- Paul Ebersold: Guitar, Keyboards, Engineer, Producer
