= Lo-Fi-Fnk =

Swedish electropop band

- Origin: Stockholm, Sweden
- Genres: Indie, electronic
- Years active: 2001–present
- Labels: La Vida Locash, Moshi Moshi, Cooperative Music, Sony/Columbia
- Members: Leonard Drougge; August Hellsing
- Website: http://www.lo-fi-fnk.com

Lo-Fi-Fnk is a Swedish electropop band formed in 2001 consisting of Leonard Drougge and August Hellsing. They have released two EPs, We Is in 2002 and ...And the JFG? in 2005. On April 24, 2006, they released their first studio album, Boylife. Since then they started touring the world, and in 2008, they started working on their second album, The Last Summer, which was released in August 2011.

== History ==
=== Formation ===
Lo-Fi-Fnk started out as an electronic act in 2001 when band members Leonard Drougge and August Hellsing entered a talent show in their high school.

=== Boylife ===
Their debut album, Boylife, was released in Scandinavia on April 24, 2006 by the label La Vida Locash and throughout the rest of Europe on August 28 by Moshi Moshi.

Following the album, Lo-Fi-Fnk embarked on a tour. In 2007, they played more than 100 shows in Europe and North America.

In 2007, the track "Change Channel" was included in the Xbox 360 game Dancing Stage Universe.

=== "Want U", "Marchin' In", and "Sleepless" ===
Lo-Fi-Fnk followed their debut album in 2008 with the song "Want U", which was included on French label Kitsuné's compilation Kitsuné Maison Compilation 6.

In February 2010, they self-released the song "Marchin' In" for free which received favourable reviews from music media like Pitchfork and NME.

In August 2010, the song "Sleepless" was released on Moshi Moshi which was described by British newspaper The Guardian as "...a gorgeous slice of piano-inflected dance pop".

=== The Last Summer ===
In 2011, Lo-Fi-Fnk released their second album, The Last Summer,.on Sony/Columbia. It was followed by a tour covering Europe, as well as North and South America.

=== "Can U Feel It", "U Don't Feel the Same", and third album ===
In late 2014, Lo-Fi-Fnk released the song "Can U Feel It", which featured singing parts and additional production by fellow Swedish artist Duvchi. "Can U Feel It" was followed by yet another song in early 2015, "U Don't Feel the Same", which premiered on music website Stereogum, and it was announced that a third album was on its way.

== Discography ==
=== Albums ===
- Boylife (2006), La Vida Locash/Moshi Moshi/Cooperative Music
- The Last Summer (2011), Sony/Columbia
- Nightclub Nirvana (2015), Columbia

=== EPs ===
- We Is (2002), La Vida Locash
- (...And the JFG?) (2005), La Vida Locash

=== Singles ===
- "Change Channel" (2006), Moshi Moshi
- "City" (2007), Moshi Moshi
- "Sleepless" (2010), Moshi Moshi
- "Boom" (2011), Sony/Columbia
- "Kissing Taste" (2012), Sony/Columbia
- "Shut the World Out" (2012), Sony/Columbia

=== Remixes ===
- Dibaba – "The Truth Blending Consortium"
- Karin Ström – "Psykos"
- Softlightes – "Girlkillsbear"
- Le Tigre – "After Dark"
- The Feeling – "Love It When You Call"
- The Alpine – "Trigger"
- Hot Club de Paris – "Your Face Looks All Wrong"
- The Russian Futurists – "Paul Simon"
- Fed MUSIC – "Yesterday Stories"
- Unklejam – "Stereo"
- Mika – "Big Girl (You Are Beautiful)"
- Shout Out Louds – "Impossible"
- GoodBooks – "Turn It Back"
- The Black Ghosts – "Face"
- Jeppe – "Lucky Boy"
- Casiokids – "Fot i Hose"
- Yelle – "Mon Pays"
- Lissi Dancefloor Disaster – "Pop Musiiic"
