= Landon Pigg =

American singer-songwriter and actor

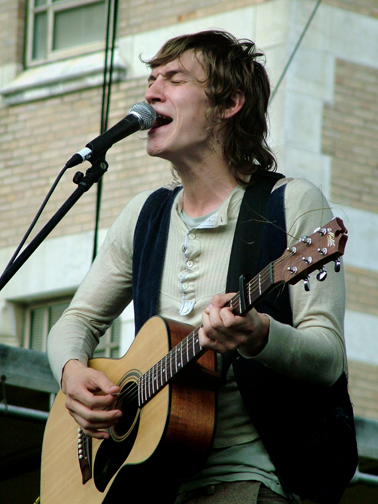
- Pigg in 2008

Background information
- Born: Landon Christian Anderson Pigg; August 6, 1983 (age 43); Nashville, Tennessee, United States
- Origin: Nashville, Tennessee, United States
- Genres: Easy listening, indie pop
- Occupations: Singer-songwriter, actor
- Instruments: Vocals, guitar
- Label: RCA Records

Landon Christian Anderson Pigg (born August 6, 1983) is an American singer-songwriter and actor.

== Career ==
After his song "This Is The Way It Ends" was featured on the 6th-season finale of television-drama series Grey's Anatomy and subsequently went into national rotation, Pigg began a publicity tour in summer 2006 which found him booked on Late Night with Conan O'Brien, Last Call with Carson Daly television talk shows and other media outlets including a radio tour, as well as appearances in Teen Vogue, Glamour and Performing Songwriter magazines. In late August, Pigg appeared on the television program The Early Show where he played "Can't Let Go", the first track from his album, LP (2006).

His song "Great Companion" was played throughout several scenes of the One Tree Hill episode "Sad Songs for Dirty Lovers" (2007).

Pigg has also performed on some television shows, including The Tonight Show with Jay Leno and Late Night with Jimmy Fallon. In 2007, his song "Falling in Love at a Coffee Shop" was featured in a De Beers commercial, and later on an AT&T telephone commercial.

In 2009, he appeared in A Fine Frenzy's video for the song "Happier", playing Alison Sudol's love interest.

Pigg co-wrote the song "Darling I Do" with Lucy Schwartz; it is the title track for the animated fantasy comedy film Shrek Forever After (2010).

He has been featured heavily on the television series Parenthood. Pigg sang "Gardenia" on the Season 2 episode "The Booth Job" with Mae Whitman. He also appeared on the third-season episode of Parenthood entitled "Mr. Honesty".

He also played a character by the name of Oliver in Whip It. He played the love interest of Babe Ruthless/Bliss played by Elliot Page (then known as Ellen Page).

== Touring ==
The last full tour Landon went on was for his last album, The Boy Who Never, and it went from March 2010 until June 2010. He toured with Madi Diaz, and the tour went through 15 states with 23 different venues. Since the tour in 2010, Landon opened for Lissie at Webster Hall, played on the Invisible Children "Break the Silence" tour, and had concerts at Loyola Marymount University and Knox College in 2011.

On June 29, 2014, Landon played his first live show in three years at the Red Clay Theatre in Duluth, GA. Landon's brother, Gabe, their father, Gary, and friends joined him onstage for several songs.

In November 2014, Landon and William Close released a cover of Joni Mitchell's song, "River." On March 8, 2019, Landon released a new single titled "Golden Hour".

== Film ==
Pigg made his feature-film debut in the comedy-drama film Whip It (2009), directed by Drew Barrymore, appearing as Oliver, the guitar-playing love interest of Elliot Page's character. He also played a small role as Peter in the 2012 movie The Perks of Being a Wallflower.

== Invisible Children ==
In November 2011 Landon uploaded a video to his YouTube account encouraging fans to donate to the cause. With a donation of twenty dollars or more to his music blog donation page, he entered users into a raffle. The three people that were chosen were contacted and asked their favorite song by Landon. Those three people got a personalized YouTube video of Landon thanking them for their donation with a special performance of their chosen song.

== Discography ==
=== Albums ===
- Demonstration (2002)
- LP (2006)
- The Boy Who Never (2009) – No. 191 Billboard 200, No. 8 Top Heatseekers

=== EPs ===
- This Is a Pigg (2006)
- Connect Sets (2006)
- Live in the Alice Lounge (2007)
- Coffee Shop (2008)

=== Singles ===
- "Can't Let Go" (2006) – No. 19 Adult Pop Top 40
- "Falling in Love at a Coffee Shop" (2007) No. 33 Adult Pop Top 40, No. 13 Adult Contemporary, No. 93 Hot 100
- "Falling in Love at a Coffee Shop" (2009) – new mix
- "Speak To The Keys"(2009) – promo single
- "The Way It Ends" (2010) – iTunes single
- "Gardenia" (2010) – duet with Mae Whitman, iTunes single
- The Little 45 "Little Darlin'"/"Say Little Things" (2011) – iTunes digital 45

=== Soundtrack appearances ===
- "Nowhere Man" – Imagine That soundtrack (2009)
- "High Times" (with Turbo Fruits) – Whip It soundtrack (2009)
- "Darling I Do" (with Lucy Schwartz) – Shrek Forever After soundtrack (2010)

=== Music videos ===
- "Can't Let Go" (promo version) (2006)
- "Can't Let Go" (2006)
- "Falling In Love At A Coffee Shop" (performance version) (2007)
- "Falling In Love At A Coffee Shop" (2009)
- "Darling I Do" (with Lucy Schwartz) (2010)
- "Little Darlin'" (2011)
