= Hind Hind Legs =

Studio album by The Lovely Feathers
- Released: April 18, 2006
- Genre: Indie rock
- Label: Equator Records

The Lovely Feathers chronology
My Best Friend Daniel (2004)	Hind Hind Legs (2006)	Fantasy of the Lot (2009)

Hind Hind Legs is an album released by Montreal-based indie band The Lovely Feathers by Equator Records on April 18, 2006.

== Track listing ==
1. "Pope John Paul"
2. "In The Valley"
3. "I Really Like You"
4. "Frantic"
5. "Wrong Choice"
6. "Mildly Decorated"
7. "Photocorners"
8. "The Only Appalachian Cornfield"
9. "Ooh You Shocked Me"
10. "E Man Sorrow"
11. "Rod Stewart"
12. "Breakfast Cake"
13. "Lion Eats the Wildebeest"

== Personnel ==
- Mark Kupfert - Vocals, Guitar
- Richard Yonofsky - Vocals, Guitar, Entertainment
- Noah Bernamoff - Bass
- Daniel Suss - Keyboard, Vocals
- Ted Suss - Drums
