= Brightblack Morning Light =

Band from Northern California

- Origin: Northern California, United States
- Genres: Freak folk
- Instruments: Fender Rhodes, Silvertone guitar
- Years active: 2005–2012
- Label: Matador
- Members: Rachael Hughes; Nathan Shineywater

Brightblack Morning Light is a musical group formed in Northern California by guitarist Nathan Shineywater and pianist Rachael Hughes, both of whom are from Alabama. The band has been "linked to a spirit of folky 1960's revivalism", and they were called one of the leaders of the "freak folk" scene. Praised for their recordings, the band also organized a number of small folk festivals in Northern California.

The band eschewed commercial exposure, having chosen a relatively quiet and luxury-free life—they have lived in cars, tents, converted chicken-coops, and cabins, and have recorded music using solar power. They were described as "back-to-the-land idealists and activists" who are influenced by such writers and activists as Edward Abbey, Leonard Peltier, Henry David Thoreau, Allen Ginsberg, and Carlos Castaneda. Shineywater also cites Ram Dass, Rachel Grimes, and Hamza El Din.

== History ==
In 2002, while called Brightblack, the band recorded an album named Ala.Cali.Tucky of songs they had performed while called Rainywood, on Galaxia Records. The album was well-received, and praised for its vocal harmonies.

The current band was founded in 2004. In 2005, BrightBlack Morning Light played at All Tomorrow's Parties, a music festival in England, at the invitation of the Kentucky band Slint. That same year the band signed with Matador Records and released their eponymous debut album, sold in Europe as well as America. In Belgium, the album received a positive review as well, in the weekly HUMO. The New York Times called it "extraordinary" and praised it for its "mesmerizing, hollowed-out grooves".

In 2008, Matador released BBML's Motion to Rejoin. The album was recorded in New Mexico, electricity for the recording sessions was generated by four solar power panels. Motion to Rejoin received attention in the United States as well as in Europe, "Top 5 Alternative Albums of 2008" UK GUARDIAN, with reviews and press coverage in Belgium and Germany. In 2009, BBML headlined/toured extensively multiple times across the USA and Europe, including Transmusicales France & ATP curation by My Bloody Valentine. In 2012, the band had a digital release entitled "LIVE JOURNAL ONE Instrumentals (2006 & 2008)". Naybob Shineywater has a project with My Bloody Valentine co-Founder entitled Library Of Sands.

== Quiet Quiet music festivals ==
The "Quiet Quiet" festivals were first started by Shineywater in 2003 in Bolinas, California, and have been organized in various locations in the area, including Big Sur. Bands and artists invited to play have included harpist Joanna Newsom, Women & Children, Lavender Diamond, Sunroof!, Ramblin Jack Elliott, Will Oldham, and Devendra Banhart. In 2006, the line-up included Greenwich Village folk veteran Michael Hurley, members of the post-hardcore band Lungfish, Vetiver, and the debut of Northern California folk singer Mariee Sioux, who BBML also took on national and European tours as main support.

At an early Quiet Quiet gig in Bolinas, signs appeared at road junctions directing those interested where to go. At the gig itself, held at Smiley's Saloon in Bolinas and the Bolinas Community Center, locals mixed uneasily with hipsters there for the gig, and Shineywater could be heard repeatedly hushing the crowd so that the unamplified bands could be heard above the saloon din. The show was extremely profitable for the musicians and audience; the banned camping on the beach weeks after the festival because so many tents appeared on the beach. Shineywater encouraged the beach as a place to camp for "all those too wasted to drive back to San Francisco".

== Line-up ==
- Rachael Hughes – keyboards
- Nathan Shineywater – guitar, slide guitar, keys

=== Supporting musicians ===
- Noah Wilson – drums
- Elias Reitz – percussion
- Otto Hauser – drums
- Andy Macleod – drums
- Paz Lenchantin – bass guitar
- Gail West – vocals
- Ann McCrary – vocals
- Matthew Davis – Trombone
- Stuart Bogie – Saxophone
- M.Bauder – Flute
- Robbie Lee – Flute

== Discography ==
- Ala.Cali.Tucky (2003, Galaxia)
- Pebbles and Ripples (2004, Split 7" with Bonnie "Prince" Billy, Self-released)
- Brightblack Morning Light (2006, Matador Records)
- Motion to Rejoin (2008, Matador Records)
- Lungfish/Brightblack Morning Light (2009, Split 7", Harvest Recordings)
- 2012 "LIVE JOURNAL ONE Instrumentals (2006 & 2008) digital iTunes release

== See also ==
- Psychedelic folk
- Freak folk
- Anti-folk
- Neofolk
