= 120 Days (album) =

Studio album by 120 Days
- Released: 10 October 2006
- Label: Smalltown Supersound (Norway); Vice Records (North America)
- Producer: 120 Days

120 Days chronology
Sedated Times (2004)	120 Days (2006)	120 Days II (2011)

Singles from 120 Days
- 1. "Come Out, Come Down, Fade Out, Be Gone" Released: 2006; 2. "Sleepwalking" Released: 2006

Professional ratings
Review scores
Source	Rating
AllMusic	2.5/5 stars
Pitchfork	(7.6/10)

120 Days is the first studio album by 120 Days, released on 10 October 2006 on the Smalltown Supersound label.

The album reached 8th on the VG-lista chart, and netted a Spellemannsprisen award to 120 Days for best rock album of the year. 65 Norwegian music critics voted 120 Days album of the year, ahead of Tom Waits' Orphans: Brawlers, Bawlers & Bastards and Joanna Newsom's Ys.

== Track listing ==
No.	Title	Length
1.	"Come Out, Come Down, Fade Out, Be Gone"	8:50
2.	"Be Mine"	4:14
3.	"C-Musik"	7:22
4.	"Sleepwalking"	3:28
5.	"Get Away"	4:40
6.	"Keep On Smiling"	5:30
7.	"Lazy Eyes"	4:40
8.	"Sleepless Nights #3"	3:03
9.	"I've Lost My Vision"	11:25

== Charts ==
Year	Chart	Position
2006	VG-lista	8
