= Kick (White Rose Movement album) =

Studio album by White Rose Movement
- Released: 6 March 2006
- Genres: Indie rock, art rock
- Label: Independiente
- Producer: Paul Epworth

Professional ratings
Review scores
Source	Rating
AllMusic	4/5 stars
NME	6/10 stars
Pitchfork	(6.8/10)

Kick is the only studio album released by English rock band White Rose Movement, released in 2006.

== Track listing ==
1. "Kick" – 3:50
2. "Girls in the Back" – 3:32
3. "Love Is a Number" – 4:05
4. "Alsatian" – 4:35
5. "London's Mine" – 3:43
6. "Pig Heil Jam" – 3:49
7. "Idiot Drugs" – 3:35
8. "Deborah Carne" – 3:14
9. "Testcard Girl" – 3:30
10. "Speed" – 3:59
11. "Cruella" – 13:41 (The song "Cruella ends at minute 4:38. After 3 minutes of silence [4:38–7:38] begins the hidden song "Luna Park".)
