= Equator Records (Canada) =

- Founded: 2006
- Founder: Matt Drouin; Fuzz de Grandpre
- Distributor(s): Crystal Math Music Group
- Country of origin: Canada
- Location: Montreal, Quebec
- Official website: equatormusic.ca

Equator Records is an independent record label established in 2006 in Montreal, Quebec, Canada. The music label was founded by Matt Drouin and Fuzz de Grandpre. Equator has released three albums, Islands' Return to the Sea, The Lovely Feathers' Hind Hind Legs and Teitur's second release, Stay Under the Stars. There is no connection between this label and the Equator Records of Nairobi, Kenya.

== Artists ==
- The Lovely Feathers
- Islands
- Teitur
- Emily Haines
- Metric
- Michael Brook

== See also ==
- List of record labels
