= The Lovely Feathers =

Canadian indie rock band

- Origin: Montreal, Quebec, Canada
- Genre: Indie rock
- Years active: 2005–present
- Labels: EMI; Equator
- Members: Noah Bernamoff (bass); David Buzaglo (keys, vocals); Mark Kupfert (vocals, guitar); Mark Shortt (bass); Ted Suss (drums); Daniel Suss (keyboards); Richard Yanofsky (guitar, vocals)

The Lovely Feathers are a Canadian indie rock band from Montreal, Quebec, Canada. They have played the South by Southwest, Pop Montreal, and North by Northeast festivals several times. Their albums reached the top of Canadian and American college radio charts. They play eccentric indie pop with quirky lyrics.

== History ==
The Lovely Feathers formed in 2004. Their first album was an independent release titled My Best Friend Daniel. Their second album (first official LP), Hind Hind Legs, was released on April 18, 2006, by EMI and Equator Records, followed by a North American tour with Metric. It was produced by Jimmy Shaw of Metric and Drew Malamud. Their third record, Fantasy of the Lot, was released on June 2, 2009, by EMI and Sparks Music.

In June 2009, their album Fantasy of the Lot was released. The album showed the band's more developed and consistent style.

The Lovely Feathers made two music videos. "Frantic", their single from Hind Hind Legs, was a playful, semi-animated video directed by artist Jon Rafman. "Lowiza", off of Fantasy of the Lot, was a more traditional narrative about aging sexual impulses, directed by Alan Compton in 2009.

Their song "Wrong Choice" was featured on the television show One Tree Hill, and their song "Frantic" was placed in an episode of Vice Guide to Travel. They have also performed live on MTV Live (Canada) twice.

After 2010, the band went into hiatus, but began performing again in 2014.

== Discography ==
=== Albums ===
- My Best Friend Daniel (2005)
- Hind Hind Legs (2006)
- Fantasy of the Lot - June 2009 (Canadian release), August 2009 (US release)

== Videography ==
- Frantic (2006) directed by Jon Rafman
- Lowiza (2009) directed by Alan Compton

== See also ==
- Music of Quebec
- Canadian rock
- List of bands from Canada
