= Blue Man Group discography =

The following is a list of CDs and DVDs by Blue Man Group.

== Audio ==
Albums

- Audio (1999) (RIAA: Gold)
- The Complex (2003)
- Live at the Venetian – Las Vegas (live, 2006)
- Three (2016)

EPs

- The Current (2003)
- The Complex Sampler (2003)
- Last Vegas 4 Song Sampler (2005)
- Last Train to Trancentral (2006)
- Canta Conmigo (2007)
- Overjoy to the World (2023)

Singles

- "I Feel Love" featuring Annette Strean of Venus Hum (2003)
- "The Current" featuring Gavin Rossdale (2003)
- "Sing Along" featuring Dave Matthews (2003)
- Shake Your Euphemism (2012)
- Giacometti / Ready Go (2016)
- Desert Portal (2024)
- Find Your Colors (2024)
- Things After Cooking and Blue Man Group (2025)

== Video ==
- Audio Video: The Making of Blue Man Group's Debut Album (2000)
- Blue Man Group DVD Premium (2001)
- The Complex Rock Tour Live (2003) (RIAA: 4× Platinum)
- Scoring Reel (2004)
- Inside the Tube (2006)
- How to Be a Megastar Live! (2008)
- Creating Blue Man Group (2009)
- 20th Anniversary Reunion Show (2011)
