= The Complex Rock Tour Live =

2003 live DVD by Blue Man Group

Video by Blue Man Group
- Released: November 25, 2003
- Genre: Experimental Rock
- Label: Lava

Blue Man Group chronology
The Complex (2003)	The Complex Rock Tour Live (2003)	Live at The Venetian – Las Vegas (2006)

The Complex Rock Tour Live is a live DVD by Blue Man Group in support of their album, The Complex with footage from their shows in Dallas. It features almost all of the songs from that album, one song ("Drumbone") from their older album, Audio, and a cover of The Who song "Baba O'Riley". The DVD also has three music videos on it: "Sing Along", "The Current", and "Exhibit 13". Side B of the album has three tracks from The Complex in 5.1 surround sound, "Above", "Your Attention", and "Sing Along".

== Production ==
Filming took place at NextStage at Grand Prairie which is in Dallas, Texas. Some additional footage was taken in Minneapolis.

The song titles menu on the DVD spells the name of the song on track 13 as "Baba O'Reilly". Blue Man Group jokingly (and incorrectly) asserts that this alternate spelling is Pete Townshend's intended spelling and attributes the spelling "Baba O'Riley" to a transcription error in the artwork for the album Who's Next by The Who.

Two songs that were part of the performance but omitted from the DVD are "Piano Smasher" and "White Rabbit". Also cut was a short cover of Led Zeppelin's "Kashmir" during the brief tributes section of the show.

== Track listing ==
1. "Above"
2. "Drumbone"
3. "Time to Start"
4. "Up To The Roof"
5. "Persona"
6. "Your Attention"
7. "Sing Along"
8. "Shadows Part 2"
9. "The Current"
10. "The Complex"
11. "I Feel Love" (cover of Donna Summer)
12. "Exhibit 13"
13. "Baba O'Reilly" [sic] (cover of The Who)
14. "What Is Rock"

== Cover songs ==
The Blue Man Group played multiple cover songs in this concert.

1. Whip It by Devo (Played before I Feel Love).
2. Crazy Train by Ozzy Osbourne (Played before I Feel Love)
3. I Feel Love Donna Summer
4. Baba O' Riley by The Who (From the album Who's Next)

== Personnel ==
Credits as provided by the DVD.

- Matt Goldman, Phil Stanton, Chris Wink – Founders
- Kalen Allmandinger – Blue Man
- Matthew Banks – Blue Man
- Tom Galassi – Blue Man
- Eric Gebow – Blue Man

Other musicians

- Jeff Turlik – music director, strings, guitar, programming
- Tracy Bonham – vocals, violin
- Mike Datz – bass, Chapman stick
- Corky Gainsford – drums
- Peter Moore – keyboards, programming, vocals
- Dave Steele – guitar
- Todd Waetzig – percussion 1
- Dave Anania – percussion 2/backup vocals on "Sing Along"
- Clem Waldmann – percussion 3

Additional performances by Venus Hum (Kip Kubin, Tony Miracle, Annette Strean).

== Certifications ==
Certifications and sales for The Complex Rock Tour Live
Region	Certification	Certified units/sales
Argentina (CAPIF) DVD	Platinum	8,000^{^}
Germany (BVMI) album	Gold	100,000^{^}
Germany (BVMI) DVD	2× Platinum	100,000^{^}
United States (RIAA) DVD	4× Platinum	400,000^{^}
^{^} Shipments figures based on certification alone.
