= Bee (EP) =

EP by Tracy Bonham
- Released: November 20, 2003
- Genre: Rock
- Label: Self-released
- Producer: Tracy Bonham

Tracy Bonham chronology
Down Here (2000)	Bee (2003)	Blink the Brightest (2005)

Bee (2003) is an EP released by Tracy Bonham. The EP was recorded after performing on Blue Man Group's album The Complex and was only available to her fans while on tour. In 2005, Bee was re-issued as a CD/DVD in Europe titled Something Beautiful.

The EP features a cover of the Led Zeppelin song "Black Dog", with the lead guitar line played instead on an electric violin.

== Track listing ==
1. "Eyes" (Bonham)
2. "All Thumbs" (Bonham)
3. "Shine" (Bonham)
4. "Freed (Live)" (Bonham)
5. "Black Dog" (Page/Plant/Jones)
