= Modern Burdens =

Studio album by Tracy Bonham
- Released: June 2, 2017
- Genre: Alternative rock
- Length: 47:42
- Language: English

Tracy Bonham chronology
Wax & Gold (2015)	Modern Burdens (2017)

Modern Burdens is a 2017 studio album by American alternative rock musician Tracy Bonham, re-recording her 1996 debut release The Burdens of Being Upright. This release received positive critical reception. Recording was enabled by a crowdfunding campaign on PledgeMusic and the album was supported with a tour.

== Reception ==
In Rolling Stone, Maura Johnston gave this album four out of five stars, calling it "a lovingly penned postcard to Bonham’s past self, and a fascinating look at where she’s at right now"; the publication named it one of the 50 best albums of 2017. Writing for ABC News, Allan Raible gave this release four out of five stars, noting the difference in tone as Bonham has aged and calling out several tracks for their radical reinterpretation of her work.

== Track listing ==
All songs written by Tracy Bonham

1. "Mother Mother" – 3:17
2. "Navy Bean" – 4:26
3. "Tell It to the Sky" – 4:33
4. "Kisses" – 2:51
5. "Brain Crack" – 3:25
6. "The One" – 4:59
7. "One Hit Wonder" – 3:40
8. "Sharks Can’t Sleep" – 5:11
9. "Bulldog" – 2:58
10. "Every Breath" – 1:48
11. "30 Seconds" – 3:16
12. "The Real" – 3:22
13. "Free" – 3:56

== Personnel ==
- Tracy Bonham – guitar, vocals, backing vocals, violin, strings, piano, synthesizer, bass guitar, drums, drum programming
- Nicole Atkins – vocals on "Tell It to the Sky"
- Kathryn Calder – vocals, piano, and keyboards on "Brain Crack"
- Jesse Cannon – post-production drum mixing on "30 Seconds"
- Dave Cook – live drum recording at Levon Helm Studios on "30 Seconds"
- Tanya Donnelly – vocals on "Sharks Can’t Sleep"
- Sadie Dupuis – vocals and guitar on "The Real"
- Chris Dyas – guitar
- Michael Eisenstein – lead vocals recording at Death Star Studio on "Every Breath"
- Peter Fox – recording at Pearl St Studios on "One Hit Wonder" (drums only) and "The One"
- John Givens – design
- Kay Hanley – vocals on "Every Breath"
- Angie Hart – vocals on "30 Seconds"
- Olive Hui – background vocals
- Scott Janowitz – lead vocal recording at Appletone Studios on "Sharks Can't Sleep"
- Wendy MacNaughton – cover illustration
- Joe Magistro – drums
- Bill McDonald – lead vocals recording at The Scouthall on "30 Seconds"
- Konrad Meissner – drums
- Todd Perlmutter – drums, recording, mixing at Captain's Cove Studios on "Mother Mother"
- PledgeMusic background vocalists
  - Jem Boere
  - Gillian Clopton
  - Katia Dotto
  - Vincent Earle
  - Christopher Elliot
  - Kate Eppers
  - Nick Ford
  - Howard Frankel
  - John Hernandez
  - Stitch Mayo
  - Ingelin Sandtorp Olsen
  - Caspi Oron
  - Leanna Phifer
  - Matthew Velazquez
  - Renee Valdez
  - David Young
- Kevin Salem – mastering at The Distortion Tank
- Andrew Sherman – organ
- Jeff Turlik – guitar
- Lisa Stockton-Wilson – background vocals
- John Wlaysewski – guitar, loops, synths, bass guitar, bass synth, synthesizer, samples, drums, drum loops, drum machine, drum programming, percussion, tambourine, recording, mixing, production
- Rachael Yamagata – vocals on "Kisses"

== See also ==
- List of 2017 albums
