= Meat hook (disambiguation) =

A meat hook is a two-sided hook normally used in butcheries to hang up meat or the carcasses of animals such as pigs and cattle.

Meat hook may also refer to:

- "Meathook", a song by the Cure from their 1979 album Three Imaginary Boys
- "Meathook", a song by Tracy Bonham from her 2000 album Down Here
- Meathook, a minor character in Monkey Island
- Meat hook, a weapon in the video game Doom Eternal
  - "Meat Hook", a song from the same game
- Meathooks, a slang term for fists in the context of fist-fighting
- Dmitri Young (born 1973), also known as "Da Meat Hook", American baseball player
- Meathooked, a 2016 book by Marta Zaraska
- The section sign: §
