= Big Beautiful Sky =

Studio album by Venus Hum
- Released: April 1, 2003
- Genre: electronic pop music
- Label: MCA

Venus Hum chronology
Hummingbirds (2002)	Big Beautiful Sky (2003)	Songs for Superheroes (2004)

Professional ratings
Review scores
Source	Rating
Allmusic	link

Big Beautiful Sky is an album by Venus Hum, released on April 1, 2003 through MCA.

== Track listing ==
1. "Hummingbirds"
2. "Montana"
3. "Soul Sloshing"
4. "Wordless May"
5. "Alice"
6. "Lumberjacks"
7. "Beautiful Spain"
8. "The Bells"
9. "Springtime #2"
10. "Honey"
11. "Sonic Boom"
12. "Bella Luna"

== Personnel ==
- Kip Kubin- Computers and synthesizers
- Tony Miracle - Computers and synthesizers, guitars, bass guitars, vocals, String arrangement
- Annette Strean - vocals, Lyrics
- Steve Fitzmaurice - Mixing
- Mike Marsh - Mastering
- Sean O'Hagan - String arrangement on "Alice", "Bella Luna" and "The Bells"
- Marcus Holdaway - String arrangement, Cello
- Jackie Norrie - Violin
- Sally Herbert - Violin
- Brian Wright - Viola
- Jacob Lawson - Violin, Viola
- Julie Adams - Cello
- Christopher Moon - Snare drum
- Merton Gauster - Photography
