= Neon City Magazine =

American magazine

- Editor: Dominick Trupiano
- Categories: Las Vegas Lifestyle
- Frequency: Monthly
- Publisher: Neon City
- Total circulation: 60,000
- First issue: November 2008
- Country: United States
- Based in: Las Vegas Valley
- Language: English
- Website: neoncitymagazine.com

Neon City Magazine is a Las Vegas Valley–based magazine that profiles entertainment, fashion, nightlife and the Las Vegas lifestyle. The magazine was founded by Michael J Giglia and Matthew J. Pawlak.

== Neon Nights ==
Neon Nights is the official blog of Neon City Magazine. The blog is written by Knee Onn and the focus is on the nights and the following days of Las Vegas. Topics include fashion, entertainment, behind the scenes, Nightlife, and all other lifestyle related happenings.

== Green efforts ==
The magazine is printed on recycled paper stock, uses only soy and vegetable based inks and natural coatings make the magazine 100% biodegradable.

The publisher also invites readers who visit their monthly launch parties to bring in any old magazines to the party to be recycled by Neon City, LLC.

== Distribution ==
Similar to 944 magazine, the publication is a free publication that is distributed across the Las Vegas Valley at boutiques, restaurants, condos, and many other similar lifestyle businesses. The first issue had a release date of November 10, 2008. Copies could be picked up in the Las Vegas valley.

== Nightlife photos ==
Nightlife photos provided inside of the magazine is done by Nightlife Underground. The focus is on the nightlife hottest and hippest the Vegas scene has to offer. The pictures as of Issue #3 focus on the days of the week not the specific events.

== Video ==
Neon City Magazine has started doing video journalism along with the publication. The videos cover fashion and entertainment in Las Vegas. They have interviewed Christian Audigier, designer of Ed Hardy clothing.

They have also interviewed David Garibaldi, renown performance artist, who has traveled with the Blue Man Group performing.

Being one of the only resources in Las Vegas to cover a wide away of fashion shows in Las Vegas, they have also covered events like the Roberto Cavalli Fashion Show at The Bank Nightclub.

== Charity/contributions ==
Neon City Magazine contributed to the Move On organization, based out of California, during the election for 2008.
