= Jumping Bean =

Jumping Bean may refer to:

- Mexican jumping bean, a type of seed in which the egg of a small moth has been laid
- "Jumping Bean", a song by Tracy Bonham from her 2000 album Down Here
- "Jumping Bean", a piece of orchestral light music written in 1947 by Robert Farnon
