= Lucie de la Falaise =

Welsh-French design consultant, former model, and socialite

- Born: Lucie Le Bailly de La Falaise; 19 February 1973 (age 52); Wales, United Kingdom
- Known for: design consultant; model; socialite
- Spouse: Marlon Richards (m. 1994)
- Children: 3
- Relatives: Maxime de la Falaise (grandmother); Loulou de la Falaise (aunt); Keith Richards (father-in-law); Anita Pallenberg (mother-in-law)

Lucie de la Falaise (born 19 February 1973) is a Welsh-born French design consultant, former model, and socialite.

== Early life ==
Lucie le Bailly de la Falaise was born in Wales in 1973, and grew up on a sheep farm. She is the younger of two children. When she was 15, she and her family moved to Fontainebleau, France. Her mother, Louisa Ogilvy, is from Scotland, and her father, the late Count Alexis le Bailly de la Falaise, was a furniture designer who was half French and half English. His mother, Maxime de la Falaise, was a model in the 1950s, while his sister, Loulou de la Falaise, was a muse to fashion designer Yves Saint Laurent. The de la Falaise family are members of an aristocratic French clan whose actual surname is Le Bailly de La Falaise.

== Career ==
De la Falaise began to model as a teenager, after having been discovered by Vogue magazine's creative director André Leon Talley, who was interviewing her aunt Loulou at the time. De la Falaise and her brother Daniel were featured in a photo spread in the November 1988 issue of Vogue. In 1989, de la Falaise appeared in advertisements for L'Oréal and Givenchy. She later landed a contract with the Yves Saint Laurent fashion house to represent the label's skincare and cosmetics.

In January 1990, at the age of 16, de la Falaise walked in her first Saint Laurent haute couture fashion show, where she wore a pink bridal gown at the end of the show. She subsequently became a muse to Saint Laurent himself, who cast her as the bride in his fashion shows from 1990 to 1994. De la Falaise also starred in the ad campaign for the Saint Laurent perfume called Paris.

While working on a photoshoot with photographer Steven Meisel for Vogue Italia in the fall of 1992, de la Falaise was given a pixie haircut by the hairstylist Garren. Her short hair was even dubbed "Twiggy revisited". From that point onward, her look became described as gamine and she was referred to as the "gamine of the moment". De la Falaise constituted part of the waif model trend of the mid-1990s.

Aside from Meisel, de la Falaise has been photographed by Paolo Roversi, Max Vadukul, Bruce Weber, Irving Penn, Corrine Day, Albert Watson, Peter Lindbergh, Mark Borthwick, Arthur Elgort, Mario Sorrenti, Andrea Blanch, Tim Walker, David Sims, and Ellen von Unwerth. In October 1994, she was one of 32 models on the cover of the 30th anniversary issue of Vogue Italia. She has also graced the covers of Vogue (USA), Vogue (Germany), Vogue Australia, Harper's Bazaar (Germany), Harpers & Queen, Elle, Town & Country, and Tatler, among others.

She has appeared in advertisements for Yves Saint Laurent haute couture, Yves Saint Laurent Rive Gauche, Guerlain perfumes, Davidoff Goodlife fragrance, Chloé, Stella McCartney, Alberta Ferretti, Comme des Garçons, Armani, Versus (Versace), Ann Taylor, Anthropologie, Banana Republic, and DKNY.

In 1997, she was inducted into the International Best Dressed Hall of Fame List.

In July 1998, she made a cameo appearance as the bride at the end of Saint Laurent's fall/winter haute couture fashion show. After modeling, de la Falaise forayed into fashion styling. She designed a series of three handbags for the Schiaparelli fashion house, which were given the names "Selene, Soteria, and Selkie". She has also worked in interior design. She designed a picnic basket in collaboration with Dior for the grand opening of its flagship store in London. In 2024, de la Falaise was named ambassador of the Sisleÿa skin care line from the brand Sisley.

== Personal life ==
In 1992, de la Falaise met Marlon Richards, the son of The Rolling Stones bandmember Keith Richards and Anita Pallenberg, through a blind date arranged by Pallenberg who had first noticed de la Falaise on the October 1992 cover of Vogue Italia. De la Falaise and Richards were married in 1994 and have 3 children. Their daughter, Ella Richards, became a model.
