= Ella Richards =

British model

Ella Rose Richards is an English model. She is the daughter of Lucie de la Falaise and Marlon Richards, the son of Keith Richards.

== Early life ==
Richards was born in New York City. For the first six years of her life, she lived with her parents in Soho. After 9/11, they left America. She was educated at Lavant House School near Chichester.

== Career ==
In 2015, Richards became the face of Burberry. In May 2022, she launched the Ella Jean, a sustainable denim collection with DL1961. In 2024, she became the face of the watch and jewelry brand Piaget.

== Personal life ==
Richards announced in March 2026 that she is expecting her first child.
