= Waif =

Abandoned person

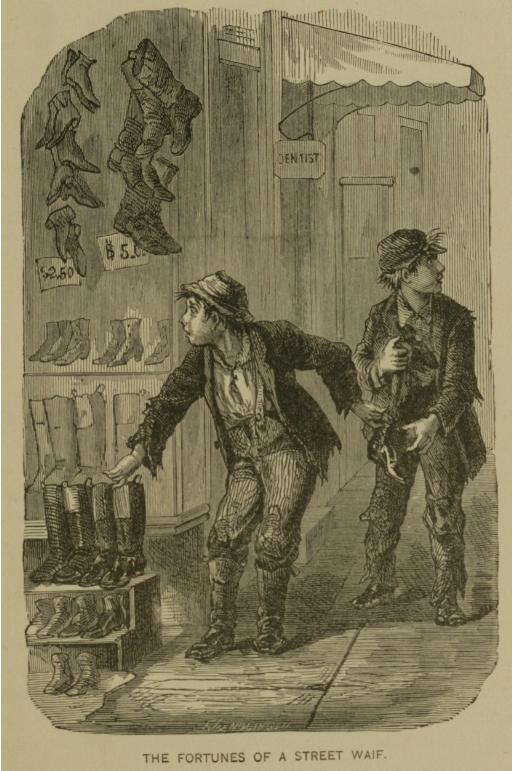
A young waif steals a pair of boots

A waif (from the Old French guaif, 'stray beast') is a person removed, by hardship, loss or other helpless circumstance, from their original surroundings. The most common usage of the word is to designate a homeless, forsaken or orphaned child, or someone whose appearance is evocative of the same.

As such, the term is similar to a ragamuffin or street urchin, although the main distinction is volitional: a runaway youth might live on the streets, but would not properly be called a waif as the departure from one's home was an exercise of free will. Likewise, a person fleeing their home for purposes of safety (as in response to political oppression or natural disaster), is typically considered not a waif but a refugee.

== Literature ==
Orphaned children, left to fend for themselves, are common as literary protagonists, especially in children's and fantasy literature. The characters Heathcliff in Emily Brontë's 1847 novel Wuthering Heights and Jo, the crossing sweeper in Charles Dickens' 1852 novel Bleak House are waifs. Dickens, it may be noted, has been called "the Master of Waif Literature." Bret Harte's 1890 novel A Waif of the Plains, set against the backdrop of the Oregon Trail in the 1850s, is another example. The children in A Series of Unfortunate Events are usually waifs, in between their unsuccessful stints in the care of various relatives. In modern adult fantasy writing, it could be argued that Kvothe of Patrick Rothfuss's The Kingkiller Chronicle was a waif.

Literary waifs are frequently depicted with a frail appearance, although such physical aspects are not inherent in the term. Such evocations may reflect the endemic malnutrition of the street urchin.

Chicago's Mercy Home for Boys and Girls, a long-term residential home for troubled young men and women from the streets and abusive homes, has published The Waif's Messenger for more than 100 years.

A cartoon waif, an orphan boy, appeared in the 1936 Rainbow Parade cartoon A Waif's Welcome.

== Nautical ==
In nautical terms, a waif is any survivor of a shipwreck compelled to make land upon a foreign shore. In this sense waif is roughly synonymous with castaway, although the latter term is generally associated with isolation; a waif (in the nautical sense) usually indicates a survivor of a marine disaster who has fallen into the care or custody of others.

"Some seven years ago...there appeared the remarkable saga of Manjiro, the shipwrecked Japanese waif who was rescued and brought to the United States by a Yankee whaling captain."

== Legal ==
=== Of people ===
Dating from the Middle Ages, when a woman was proscribed and subjected to penalties of outlawry, she was said to be "waived" and called a "waif". This waiving of the law was tantamount to outlawry since it removed all protection of the law. Women in this status were outside of the "law", and as with male outlaws, others could kill them on sight as if they were wild animals.

=== Of property ===
A waif was an item of ownerless and unclaimed property found on a landowner's territory, while a stray referred to a domestic animal that had wandered onto the land. Both terms originated from Anglo-Norman French. A grant of waif and stray permitted the landowner to take ownership of such goods or animals if they remained unclaimed after a set period of time. In late medieval England, the management of waifs and strays required the coordination and cooperation of lords and the local communities they presided over.

Under current British common law, items stolen by a thief and discarded during the thief's flight are waifs. Similarly, estrays are "valuable animals of a tame or reclaimable nature found wandering and whose owner is unknown." The monarch of the United Kingdom owns both such waifs and estrays by royal prerogative.

== Music ==
References to waifs in music are sometimes self-deprecating, as in the name of the Australian folk rock band name The Waifs, or Tracy Bonham's 1995 rock song "I'm Not a Waif".

Many other songs use the word "waif" to romanticize street children and runaways, as in the Marc Almond 1990 song "Waifs and Strays", or the Steely Dan jazz rock 2000 song "Janie Runaway", which describes the title character as being the "wonderwaif of Gramercy Park".

The psychedelic rock song "Black and White Sunshine" by Noel Gallagher's High Flying Birds, from the 2017 album Who Built the Moon?, contains the lyrics "these are the glory days for the waifs and the strays".

Moreover in 2017, the Canadian band Alvvays recorded the indie pop song "Saved By A Waif", together with the whole album Antisocialites.

Frank Turner's 2019 folk song "Jinny Bingham's Ghost" contains the lyrics "Be sure to raise a toast. To the patron saint of the waifs and strays. To Jinny Bingham's ghost".

== Botany ==
In botany, a waif is a non-native species (or other non-native taxon) that occurs outside of cultivation (gardening, agriculture, and so forth) and either a) is unsuccessful at reproduction without human intervention, or b) only persists for a few generations and then disappears. A waif never becomes naturalized in the wild. A taxon that successfully reproduces in the wild (either asexually or sexually) is not a waif. Persistent observations spanning more than a single season are usually necessary to determine if a taxon is a waif. Even so, botanists do collect specimens of waif taxa and consequently waifs are sometimes included in taxon lists or distribution maps. Occasionally botanists conduct research on the potential viability of waif species. The phrase "waif flora" refers to plant species that occur on oceanic islands due to chance long-distance dispersion of seeds.

== Fashion ==
In fashion and related popular culture, the term "waif" is commonly used to describe a very thin person, usually a woman.

"The waif look" was used in the 1960s to describe thin, large-eyed models such as Twiggy, and Edie Sedgwick. The "gamine" look of the 1950s, associated with actresses such as Audrey Hepburn, Leslie Caron and Jean Seberg, was, to some extent, a precursor.

The term "waif" was seemingly ubiquitous in the 1990s, with heroin chic fashion and models such as Kate Moss and Jaime King on the runways and in advertisements. Actresses such as Ally McBeal star Calista Flockhart, Winona Ryder, recently the British actress Keira Knightley and singer Celine Dion have all been pinned with the term.

Although the heroin chic look has gone out of fashion, it still holds some popularity in Hollywood. For example, Wonderbra model Eva Herzigová was criticized over her waif-like figure. Daily Mirror columnist Sue Carroll wrote:

The supermodel, looking like a throwback to the 'heroin chic' era of waif-like undernourished models, was an X-ray of her old self, skeletally thin with greasy hair, blue lips, a cold sore and sunken eyes.

== Bibliography ==
- Mink, J. N.; Dickschat, T.; Singhurst, J. R.; Holmes, W. C. (2017). "Carica papaya (Caricaceae) as a probable waif in central Texas" (PDF). Phytoneuron. 2017–53: 1–5. ISSN 2153-733X.
- Nesom, Guy L. (2000). "Which non-native plants are included in floristic accounts?" (PDF). SIDA, Contributions to Botany. 19 (1): 189–193. JSTOR 41967771.
