= Live at The Venetian – Las Vegas =

Live album by Blue Man Group
- Released: July 25, 2006
- Recorded: Blue Man Theatre, The Venetian, Paradise, Nevada
- Length: 38:33
- Label: Blue Man Group Records
- Producer: Todd Perlmutter

Blue Man Group chronology
Las Vegas 4 Song Sampler (2005)	Live at The Venetian – Las Vegas (2006)	Last Train to Trancentral (2006)

Live at The Venetian – Las Vegas is a digital album by Blue Man Group, released through the iTunes Store on July 25, 2006. The 10-track album is a compilation of various live recordings of the group's performances at The Venetian Resort Hotel Casino's Blue Man Theater on the Las Vegas Strip in Paradise, Nevada, where the group has been performing since October 2005. The album features seven songs, albeit different arrangements, from their debut album, Audio, and one song from their second album, The Complex ("Time to Start"). The two other tracks on the album, "Feast Picking" and "Chant Jam," are the live arrangements/combinations of past pieces in the show. A series of Blue Man Group podcasts were also released through the iTunes Store to promote both the album and the show itself.

A live version of "Rods and Cones" was released as a digital single two weeks before the release of the album, on July 11, 2006. A video of the live performance of "Rods and Cones" has also been released through the iTunes Store, which marked the first time that a Blue Man Group theatrical performance has been released to the public.

== Track listing ==
1. "Opening Mandelbrot" – 1:48
2. "Tension Song" – 1:31
3. "Drumbone" – 2:29
4. "Feast Picking" – 6:38
5. "PVC IV" – 3:55
6. "Time to Start" – 4:19
7. "Rods and Cones" – 4:38
8. "Utne Wire Man" – 3:48
9. "Klein Mandelbrot" – 4:54
  - live arrangement of "Klein Mandelbrot" from Audio
10. "Chant Jam" – 4:33
11. MR Jam – 3:33
  - live arrangement of "Endless Column" from Audio
