= Last Train to Trancentral (EP) =

EP by Blue Man Group
- Released: October 31, 2006
- Recorded: September 4, 2005
- Genre: Experimental rock, Avant-garde
- Length: 16:44
- Label: Blue Man Group Records
- Producer: Todd Perlmutter

Blue Man Group chronology
Live at The Venetian – Las Vegas (2006)	Last Train to Trancentral (2006)	How to Be a Megastar Live! (2008)

Last Train to Trancentral is a digital EP by Blue Man Group, released on October 31, 2006 through the iTunes Store. The EP features a cover of The KLF song "Last Train to Trancentral", which is played during the paper finale at Blue Man Group's theatrical shows (except in London and Berlin where a remixed cover version of "I Feel Love" is played). The other tracks include one live song originally from the album, Audio ("PVC IV"), and two previously unreleased tracks. The track "Marshmallows & Gumballs" is from a theatrical skit where a Blue Man tosses marshmallows into another Blue Man's mouth, and the third Blue Man puts "gumballs" filled with paint in his mouth, and squirts the paint on a spinning canvas, creating spinart. The "Wands" song is a short that is played during the Venetian show.

== Track listing ==
1. "Last Train to Trancentral" — 3:36
2. "Marshmallows & Gumballs" — 5:48
3. "Wands" (Live) — 2:06
4. "PVC IV" (Live and Unedited) — 5:14
