= Live in Orlando =

Live in Orlando may refer to:

- Live in Orlando, CD and DVD by Funk Brothers
- Live in Orlando (King Crimson album)
- Live in Orlando (Trazendo a Arca album)
- Live in Orlando, album from Blue Man Group discography
