= The Current (song) =

Single by Blue Man Group featuring Gavin Rossdale

from the album The Complex
- Released: March 14, 2003
- Genre: Experimental rock; industrial rock
- Length: 3:49
- Label: Lava; Atlantic
- Songwriters: Christian Dyas; Matt Goldman, Phil Stanton, Chris Wink
- Producers: Steve Laprise; Todd Perlmutter; Matt Goldman; Phil Stanton; Chris Wink

Blue Man Group singles chronology
"The Current" (2003)	"I Feel Love" (2003)

"The Current" is a song by Blue Man Group, released as the first single from their 2003 concept album, The Complex. The song features the guest vocals of Gavin Rossdale of Bush, and was featured in the film, Terminator 3: Rise of the Machines. Once the group made a deal with the film's producers, one of the film's crew suggested Rossdale for a singer who could fit the song's dynamic range, who once presented with the song said he approved the song and could reach all its notes, leading the Blue Man Group to fly to London to record his vocals and also bring in Bush guitarist Chris Traynor.

== Song meaning ==
The song deals with urban and occupational isolation, the two key themes from the album. The isolation theme is furthered by the setting, which takes place in the underground portion of the urban complex—the location of the phone lines, electrical wires, and Internet connections. According to the Blue Man Group themselves, "We wanted to capture the modern paradox of having access to millions of people through electric current but still being cut off from any real human contact."

The song might then be assumed to be about how technology is moving the world forward whilst it moves people backwards.

== Music video ==
Directed by Terminator 3 production designer Jeff Mann, the music video was filmed at an abandoned power plant in Redondo Beach, California, and had the intention of having the Blue Men "act as a kind of video DJ, 'scratching' together video loops in a way that actually creates the underlying rhythm of the song".

== Track listings ==
=== CD single ===
1. "The Current" (Album Version) – 3:49
2. "The Current" (Tee's Freeze Mix) – 7:40
3. "The Current" (Blue Radio Mix) – 3:46

=== 12" single ===
1. The Current (Armand Van Helden Club Mix) – 8:40
2. The Current (Armand Van Helden Dub Mix) – 7:58
3. The Current (Tee's Freeze Mix) – 7:40
4. The Current (Blue Radio Mix) – 3:46

== Chart positions ==
Chart (2003)	Peak position
UK Singles Chart	93
Dutch Singles Chart	96

== Live performances ==
The song was performed at The Complex concerts, with vocals from Peter Moore. There was a special performance with Rossdale on The Late Late Show with Craig Kilborn.
