= Venous hum =

- Other names: cervical venous hum
- Specialty: Vascular surgery
- Symptoms: Audible humming sound from the upper chest
- Causes: Insufficiency, regurgitation, stenosis

Venous hum is a benign auscultatory phenomenon caused by the normal flow of blood through the jugular veins. At rest, 20% of cardiac output flows to the brain via the internal carotid and vertebral arteries; this drains via the internal jugular veins. The rush of blood from these veins to the brachiocephalic vein can cause the vein walls to vibrate, creating a humming noise which can often be heard by the subject.

Typically, a peculiar humming sound is heard in the upper chest near the clavicle, emanating from the supraclavicular fossa just lateral to the sternocleidomastoid muscle, usually more obviously on the right side than on the left. The sound may radiate to the upper sternal border on either side. Though the exact mechanism is still unclear, it has been suggested that the hum occurs when otherwise silent laminar flow through the internal jugular vein is disturbed by deformation of this vessel at the level of the transverse process of the atlas during head rotation.

The venous hum is heard throughout the cardiac cycle, though is typically louder during diastole. It may be easier to hear when sitting, when the chin is elevated, or when the head is rotated contralaterally (away from the location of the sound); deep inspiration and hyperkinetic circulatory states (e.g. hyperthyroidism) can also increase its intensity. It may be loud enough to result in audible pulsatile tinnitus. It is by far the most common type of normal continuous murmur, universal in healthy children, and frequently present in healthy young adults, especially during pregnancy.

The humming may be confused with a heart murmur, which may be a symptom of a potentially serious condition. The difference is easily detected by placing light pressure on the internal jugular vein when listening to the heart, which will immediately abolish or change the venous hum, whereas a true heart murmur will be unaffected by this maneuver. The murmur also disappears when the patient is in the supine position or may disappear if the subject turns their head to one side. It is also known by the names "nun's murmur" and "bruit de diable" (noise of devils).

While a venous hum may provoke consultation with a healthcare professional, the hum itself is entirely harmless and is the product of ordinary cardiac physiology. Abnormal and potentially serious conditions such as thyrotoxicosis and anemia, by augmenting blood flow through the jugular veins, can nonetheless initiate or reinforce the venous hum, making it more noticeable, and manipulation of the sound with various maneuvers has often helped physicians discover and diagnose cardiovascular disorders.

== See also ==
- Venus Hum, American electronic pop band which derives its name from this phenomenon
