= Gamine =

Slim, boyish, elegant young woman

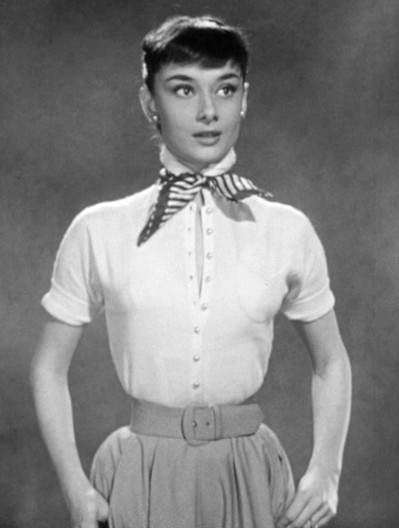
Audrey Hepburn has been cited as the epitome of a gamine.

The gamine is a popular archetype of a slim, often boyish, elegant young woman who is described as mischievous or teasing, popularized in film and fashion from the turn of the 20th century through to the 1950s. The word gamine is a French word, the feminine form of gamin, originally meaning urchin, waif or playful, naughty child. It was used in English from about the mid-19th century (for example, by William Makepeace Thackeray in 1840 in one of his Parisian sketches), but in the 20th century came to be applied in its more modern sense.

== Lexicography ==
In 1997 the publisher HarperCollins drew up a list of 101 words – one a year – that defined the years 1896 to 1997. Gamine was chosen for 1899, being described by Philip Howard in The Times as follows:

An elfish young woman. Audrey Hepburn in Roman Holiday was the archetypal, unforgettable, adorable gamine.

Gamine has been used particularly to describe women in the performing arts or world of fashion. In that context, the closest English word – of Anglo-Norman origin – is probably "waif" (although "gamine" is often seen as conveying an additional sense of style and chic). For example, in a press release of 1964, impresario Andrew Loog Oldham described the 17-year-old singer Marianne Faithfull as "shy, wistful, waif-like"; and writer and musician John Amis referred to German-born actress Luise Rainer (1910–2014) as Paul Muni's "waif-wife" in the 1937 film, The Good Earth.

Gaminerie has sometimes been used in English with reference to the behaviour or characteristics of gamin(e)s.

== In silent films ==
In the early 20th century, silent films brought to public attention a number of actresses who sported a gamine look. These included the Canadian-born Mary Pickford (1892–1979), who became known as "America's Sweetheart" and, with her husband Douglas Fairbanks, was one of the founders of the film production company United Artists; Lillian Gish (1893–1993), notably in Way Down East (1920); and Louise Brooks (1906–1985), whose short bobbed hair, widely copied in the 1920s, came to be regarded as both a gamine and a "Bohemian" trait (this style having first appeared among the Paris demi-monde before World War I and among London art students during the war.) In 1936, Charlie Chaplin cast his then-girlfriend Paulette Goddard (1910–1990) as an orphaned gamine (credited as "A Gamin") in one of his last silent films, Modern Times.

== Audrey Hepburn and gamines of the 1950s ==
In the 1950s "gamine" was applied notably to the style and appearance of the Belgian-born actress Audrey Hepburn (1929–1993): for example, in the films, Sabrina (1954) and Funny Face (1957). Hepburn also played the role of the gamine Gigi in New York (1951) in the play of that name, based on the novel (1945) by Colette, who had personally "talent-spotted" her when she was filming in Monte Carlo. On film and in photographs, Hepburn's short hair and petite figure created a distinct and enduring "look", well defined by Don Macpherson, who cited her "naïveté which did not rule out sophistication", and described her as "the first gamine to be accepted as overpoweringly chic".

Other film actresses of the period regarded as gamines included Leslie Caron (b. 1931), who played the leading role in the 1958 musical film of Gigi; Jean Seberg (1938–1979), best known in Bonjour Tristesse (1958) and Jean-Luc Godard's Breathless (1960); Shirley MacLaine (b. 1934), in films like Some Came Running (1958), Hot Spell (1958), and The Apartment (1960); and Jean Simmons (1929–2010), for example, in Angel Face (1953). The French singer Juliette Gréco (1927–2020), who emerged from Bohemian Paris in the late 1940s to become an international star in the 1950s, also had gamine qualities.

== 1960s and beyond ==
In many ways, the "gamine look" of the 1950s paved the way for the success of the following English models: Jean Shrimpton (b. 1942), one of the first to promote the miniskirt in 1965; Twiggy (b. Lesley Hornby, 1949), who became "The Face of '66"; Penelope Tree (b. 1949), who was a noted figure of the Swinging Sixties; and Kate Moss (b. 1974), associated in the 1990s with the "waif" look and what, notably through an advertising campaign for Calvin Klein in 1997, became known as "heroin chic." Moss was part of a trend of "wafer" thin models which was satirized in Neil Kerber's strip cartoon "Supermodels" in the magazine Private Eye.

== Other gamines ==
Others who have been described as gamines include: Danish-French actress Anna Karina (1940–2019); American actresses Edie Sedgwick (1943–1971), Mia Farrow (b. 1945), Liza Minnelli (b. 1946), Sissy Spacek (b. 1949), Jennifer Jason Leigh (b. 1962), Demi Moore (b. 1962), Calista Flockhart (b. 1964), Bridget Fonda (b. 1964), Mary Stuart Masterson (b. 1966), Julia Roberts (b. 1967), Martha Plimpton (b. 1970), Winona Ryder (b. 1971), Selma Blair (b. 1972), Gwyneth Paltrow (b. 1972), Michelle Williams (b. 1980), Anne Hathaway (b. 1982), and Rooney Mara (b. 1985); English actresses Susannah York (1939–2011), Rita Tushingham (b. 1942), Helena Bonham Carter (b. 1966), Tara FitzGerald (b. 1967), Samantha Morton (b. 1977), Keira Knightley (b. 1985), Carey Mulligan (b. 1985), and Emma Watson (b. 1990); Portuguese actress Maria de Medeiros (b. 1965); French actresses Juliette Binoche (b. 1964), Caroline Proust (b. 1967), Vanessa Paradis (b. 1972), and Audrey Tautou (b. 1976); English-French actress Charlotte Gainsbourg (b. 1971); Australian actress Mia Wasikowska (b. 1989); Israeli-American actress Natalie Portman (b. 1981); English-American actress Lily Collins (b. 1989); Canadian model Linda Evangelista (b. 1965); American models Tina Chow (1950–1992) and Kristen McMenamy (b. 1964); Welsh-French model Lucie de la Falaise (b. 1973); Australian singer Natalie Imbruglia (b. 1975); and American singer Cat Power (b. Chan Marshall, 1972).

Penelope Chetwode (1910–1986), later Lady Betjeman, wife of the Poet Laureate, John Betjeman, was described by Betjeman's biographer A. N. Wilson as "gamine of feature, but large-breasted". Corinne Bailey Rae alleged that she was called a gamine in her song, "Choux Pastry Heart" (2005).

=== In film ===
Among the notable gamine characters of film are: Gelsomina, the street performer from La Strada (1954), played by Giulietta Masina (1921–1994); Bree Daniels, the prostitute played by Jane Fonda (b. 1937) in Klute (1971) (whose hairstyle was sometimes referred to as the "Klute shag"); Nikita, the titular punkish junkie in Luc Besson's 1990 film, played by Anne Parillaud (b. 1960); Amélie, in the 2001 romantic comedy of that name, played by Audrey Tautou; and, most recently, Alice Cullen, the vampire played by Ashley Greene (b. 1987) in The Twilight Saga (2008).

Gamines share similarities with the modern, cinematic "Manic Pixie Dream Girl" stock character.
