= Wax & Gold =

Studio album by Tracy Bonham
- Released: August 21, 2015
- Studio: Applehead Studios, The Distortion Tank, Old Soul Studios
- Genre: Rock, post-grunge, indie rock
- Producer: Kevin Salem

Tracy Bonham chronology
Masts of Manhatta (2010)	Wax & Gold (2015)	Modern Burdens (2017)

Professional ratings
Review scores
Source	Rating
Rolling Stone	4/5 stars

Wax & Gold is the fifth album by singer-songwriter Tracy Bonham. It was released on August 21, 2015.

== Track listing ==
All songs written by Tracy Bonham (except *= written by Tracy Bonham and Kevin Salem)

1. "Noonday Demon"
2. "Luck"*
3. "Wax & Gold"
4. "This Here's My Grandpa's Guitar"
5. "Oh McKenzie Silver Water"
6. "GoneGoneGone"
7. "Black Tears"
8. "From the Tree to the Hand to the Page"
9. "Under the Ruby Moon"
10. "LoveLoveLoveLoveLove"*
11. "One of These Days"

== Personnel ==
- Tracy Bonham – Vocals, violins, piano, hammond organ
- Kevin Salem – Guitar, banjo, dobro
- Mike DuClos – Electric bass and upright bass
- Joe Magistro – Drums and percussion
- Jay Collins – Flute and Baritone Sax on 1
- Amy Helm – Vocals on 8
- Langhorne Slim – Vocals on 8 and 10
- Aaron Freeman – Vocals on 1

== Production ==
- Producer: Kevin Salem
- Mixed by Kevin Salem
- Cover photography by Sherwin Lainez
