= Masts of Manhatta =

2010 studio album by Tracy Bonham

Studio album by Tracy Bonham
- Released: July 13, 2010
- Genre: Rock, post-grunge
- Label: Engine Room, Lojinx
- Producer: Tracy Bonham

Tracy Bonham chronology
Blink the Brightest (2005)	Masts of Manhatta (2010)	Wax & Gold (2015)

Professional ratings
Aggregate scores
Source	Rating
AnyDecentMusic?	5.9/10
Metacritic	76/100
Review scores
Source	Rating
AllMusic	4/5 stars
Billboard	4/5 stars
Entertainment Weekly	B+
The Line of Best Fit	(mixed)
PopMatters	7/10
Rolling Stone	3.5/5 stars
Slant Magazine	3.5/5 stars

Masts of Manhatta is the fourth album by American singer-songwriter Tracy Bonham. It was released on July 13, 2010 by Engine Room Recordings in the United States and Lojinx in the UK.

== Track listing ==
All songs by Tracy Bonham

1. "Devil's Got Your Boyfriend"
2. "Your Night Is Wide Open"
3. "Big Red Heart"
4. "Josephine"
5. "When You Laugh The World Laughs With You"
6. "We Moved Our City To The Country"
7. "Reciprocal Feelings"
8. "In The Moonlight"
9. "You're My Isness"
10. "Angel, Won't You Come Down?"
11. "I Love You Today"

== Personnel ==
- Tracy Bonham – vocals, violins, Fender Rhodes, guitar, piano, claves, spaghetti pot, cardboard box
- Smokey Hormel – guitar
- Tim Lunztel – upright bass, electric upright bass
- Andy Borger – drums and percussion
- Dan Cho – cello on 2, 7, 11
- Matt Glaser – fiddle on 10
- Ken Rich – tuba on 4
- Andrew Sherman – Wurlitzer on 2
- Josh Lattanzi – slide guitar on 9
- Konrad Meissner – percussion on 5

== Production ==
- Producer: Tracy Bonham
- Mastered by Adam Ayan at Gateway Mastering, Portland, ME
- Artwork by Donnie Molls
- Design layout and revisions by Megan Volz
