= Überschall =

American rock band

- Origin: Las Vegas, Nevada, USA
- Genres: Improvisational, rock, industrial rock, experimental, avant-garde, experimental rock, Performance art
- Instruments: Drums, guitar, bass
- Years active: (2000-Current)
- Label: (unknown)
- Spinoff of: Blue Man Group
- Members: Jordan Cohen (Drums); Christian Brady (Guitar); Charles Henry (Guitar); Elvis Lederer (Guitar); Wickett Tony Pickett (Bass); Jeff Tortora (Drums); Todd Waetzig (Drums)

Überschall (German Überschall: supersonic) is an improvisational rock band based in Las Vegas, Nevada consisting of past and present Blue Men and band members of Blue Man Group. Uberschall frequently performs at the Double-Down Saloon.

== Members ==
- Jordan Cohen - Drums
- Christian Brady - Guitar
- Charles Henry - Guitar
- Elvis Lederer - Guitar
- Wickett Tony Pickett - Bass
- Jeff Tortora - Drums
- Todd Waetzig - Drums
