= The Colors in the Wheel =

Studio album by Venus Hum
- Released: July 24, 2006
- Genres: Electronic, pop
- Length: 43:33
- Label: Nettwerk/Mono-Fi Records

Venus Hum chronology
Songs for Superheroes (2004)	The Colors in the Wheel (2006)

Professional ratings
Review scores
Source	Rating
The A.V. Club	B+
Slant Magazine	3/5 stars

The Colors in the Wheel is an album by Venus Hum. It was released in 2006 on the Nettwerk recording label subsidiary, Mono-Fi Records. The release party was held at Grimey's New and Pre-loved Music in the band's hometown of Nashville, Tennessee.

== Critical reception ==
The A.V. Club wrote that the album "peaks in the classically sinewy synth-pop wonder 'You Break Me Down,' where [Annette] Strean sings about exhaustion in a voice that keeps pushing to the edge of cracking, then coming back stronger." IGN wrote that "the deft blend of electronic and acoustic elements turn The Colors In The Wheel into a killer sonic landscape, full of incredible riches."

== Track listing ==
No.	Title	Length
1.	"Turn Me Around"	4:18
2.	"Yes And No"	4:26
3.	"Birds And Fishes"	3:57
4.	"Do You Want To Fight Me?"	3:23
5.	"Genevieve's Wheel"	4:03
6.	"You Break Me Down" (featuring Kirk Cornelius)	5:26
7.	"Surgery In The Sky"	3:35
8.	"Pink Champagne"	4:48
9.	"72 Degrees"	4:37
10.	"Go To Sleep"	5:00
Total length:		43:33

Hidden tracks
No.	Title	Length
1.	"Untitled"	0:20
2.	"Untitled"	0:28
3.	"Untitled"	0:13
4.	"Untitled"	0:45
