= Briar Street Theatre =

Theatre in Chicago, Illinois

- Interactive map of Briar Street Theatre
- Address: 3133 N Halsted St. Chicago, Illinois; United States
- Owner: Topel family
- Operator: Fox Theatricals
- Capacity: 625
- Designation: 41°56′20″N 87°38′56″W

Construction
- Opened: 1985
- Closed: 2025

Website
- www.blueman.com

The Briar Street Theatre was a theatre located in Lake View, Chicago, and was home to the long-running Blue Man Group. Originally the carriage house for the Marshall Field and Company horses, the space was purchased by Walter Topel and reconstructed into a theater. The Briar Street Theatre is most notably associated with the Blue Man Group act, which began performing at the Briar Street Theatre in 1997 and, as of January 2025, has ceased performances. The theater closed after the run of Blue Man Group ended.

== History ==
Built in 1901, the space was used as the stables where the horses used and owned by Marshall Field's would stay. These horses were used for the company's delivery service. As time passed, the lot became useless and in 1970, Walt Topel, founder of Topel and Associated, Ltd., bought the building from Werner Kennelly Moving and Storage Company and redesigned it into a sound stage and office where his film production company would thrive from. From 1977 to 1985, this building also housed Walt Topel's post-production company, Cinetronics, Ltd. This business was later renamed Swell and moved downtown in 1984. In 1985, the theater was reopened and became a part of the culture of Chicago. Today, the Topel family is still the owner of the venue and the original second floor actually hangs from the ceiling by large turnbuckles that can still be seen.

== Notable performers ==
The Briar Street Theatre has hosted many performers:

- Mickey Rooney
- Veronica Hamel
- Sada Thompson
- Ellen Burstyn
- Dorothy Loudon
- Shelley Berman
- Betty Buckley
- George Segal

== Past productions ==
Since the opening of the Briar Street Theatre, singers have not been the only performances held. Other noteworthy productions hosted at the theater have been run by Fox Theatricals and have included the following:

- Blue Man Group is a group of three bald men dressed in black clothing with the remaining showing skin painted blue. The Blue Man Group formed in the late 1980s and have performed in many major cities. (Note: Chicago, Boston, New York, Las Vegas, Berlin, Toronto, and London.) Performances began here in 1997 and ended in January 2025.
- Driving Miss Daisy
- Laughter on the 21st Floor
- Having Our Say
- Jackie Mason's Politically Incorrect
- Steve Martin's Picasso at the Lapin Agile
- Concerts by Barbara Cook

== Layout and features ==
The theater has 625 seats. The dimensions of the Briar Street Theater's stage is a proscenium of 38'w x 20', a width of 36'4", a depth of 32', and a height of 23' to grid. The theater is also wheelchair accessible and offers closed-circuit headsets.

The venue also has artworks within the lobby created by artists such as Van Gogh, Brancusi, Stanton, Picasso, and the Blue Man Group.
