= DL1961 =

Denim brand

- Founded: 2008
- Founder: Faisal & Maliha Ahmed
- Key people: Zahra Ahmed (CEO)

DL1961 is a global premium denim brand that is carried in hundreds of stores. The company uses renewable energy from solar panels for their factory operations. According to the DL1961 CEO, Zahra Ahmed, the brand is "centered around innovation and technology".

== History ==
The brand was founded in 2008 using XFIT LYCRA, a fabric it has patented. XFIT is a cotton-wrapped Lycra thread intertwined with polyester made by DL parent company ADM Denim, which was founded by Faisal and Meliha Ahmed. The company uses an eco-friendly manufacturing process that it introduced in 2013 to use less water, waste, and dye. The brand has a maternity line.

== Recognition ==
According to Vogue journalist, Liana Satenstein, DL1961 is "known for its jumpsuits and easygoing styles". Chicago Tribune journalist Alexia Elejalde-Ruiz says the brand is known for its "four-way stretch, designed to be slimming and to prevent sagging". Glamour journalist Fawnia Soo Hoo described the brand as "The high-tech, eco-chic jean".
