= The Burdens of Being Upright =

1996 studio album by Tracy Bonham

Studio album by Tracy Bonham
- Released: March 19, 1996
- Recorded: Summer 1995
- Studios: Fort Apache Studios, Cambridge, MA
- Genre: Alternative rock
- Length: 35:28
- Label: Island
- Producers: Sean Slade; Paul Q. Kolderie

Tracy Bonham chronology
Liverpool Sessions EP (1995)	The Burdens of Being Upright (1996)	Down Here (2000)

Singles from The Burdens of Being Upright
- 1. "Mother Mother" Released: March 12, 1996; 2. "Sharks Can't Sleep" Released: 1996; 3. "The One" Released: 1996

The Burdens of Being Upright is the debut studio album by American singer-songwriter Tracy Bonham, released on March 19, 1996, by Island Records.

== Content ==
The Burdens of Being Upright was recorded in the summer of 1995 at Fort Apache Studios in Cambridge, Massachusetts. Referencing this album, in 2015 Bonham said,

That whole album was my experiment with getting a guitar. I was rebelling. It was just raw. I was like, ‘Just get out and do it; get behind a microphone and just scream.’ Twenty years ago I had more doubts; I thought, ‘I can’t just stand there and do that’ — which is when I knew I had to do it.

The album cover (a reference to German photographer August Sander's work "The Bricklayer") was photographed by George DuBose, who was the in-house photographer at the hip hop label Cold Chillin' Records.

== Commercial performance ==
The Burdens of Being Upright debuted at number 136 on the Billboard 200 chart dated April 27, 1996, and later reached its peak position of number 54 on the chart on June 15, 1996. It remained on the chart for 25 weeks. On November 12, 1996, the album was certified Gold by the Recording Industry Association of America (RIAA), signifying the shipment of 500,000 copies of the album.

== Critical reception ==
Professional ratings
Review scores
Source	Rating
AllMusic	3/5 stars
The Encyclopedia of Popular Music	3/5 stars
Entertainment Weekly	A
Kerrang!	3/5 stars
Music Central Online	3/5 stars
MusicHound Rock	3/5 stars
NME	7/10
Seventeen	3/4 stars

Rolling Stone noted that the album "tells a coherent, largely autobiographical story about a girl getting even with the obnoxious people who piss her off and underestimate her... With music ranging from laid-back Liz Phair-style storytelling to hard-edge alternative arena rock, she blasts ex-boyfriends ('Navy Bean', 'The One'), ridicules rock stars ('Kisses') and makes a pre-emptive strike at critics who might be tempted to label her ('One Hit Wonder')."

== Track listing ==
All tracks are written by Tracy Bonham.

No.	Title	Length
1.	"Mother Mother"	3:00
2.	"Navy Bean"	2:49
3.	"Tell It to the Sky"	4:05
4.	"Kisses"	2:20
5.	"Brain Crack"	1:05
6.	"The One"	3:26
7.	"One Hit Wonder"	3:01
8.	"Sharks Can't Sleep"	4:33
9.	"Bulldog"	2:07
10.	"Every Breath"	2:33
11.	"30 Seconds"	3:14
12.	"The Real"	3:16

== Personnel ==
Credits adapted from the album's liner notes.

- Tracy Bonham – guitar, violin, vocals
- Ed Ackerson – additional guitar (tracks 2, 3, 6, 8)
- Drew Parsons – bass
- Josh Freese – drums (tracks 1, 2, 6, 8-10)
- Fred Eltringham – drums (tracks 3, 12)
- Eric Paul – drums (tracks 7, 11)
- Sean Slade – organ (tracks 7, 9, 10); production, engineer
- Paul Q. Kolderie – production, engineer

== Charts ==
Chart (1996)	Peak position
Australian Albums (ARIA Charts)	31
Dutch Albums (Album Top 100)	26
Norwegian Albums (VG-lista)	27
New Zealand Album (RMNZ)	46
Swedish Albums (Sverigetopplistan)	48
US Heatseekers Albums (Billboard)	9
US Billboard 200	54

== Certifications ==
Region	Certification	Certified units/sales
Canada (Music Canada)	Gold	50,000^{^}
United States (RIAA)	Gold	500,000^{^}
^{^} Shipments figures based on certification alone.

== Awards ==
Grammy Award Nominations

Year	Nominee	Category
1997	"Mother Mother"	Best Female Rock Vocal Performance
1997	The Burdens of Being Upright	Best Alternative Album
