= Blink the Brightest =

Studio album by Tracy Bonham
- Released: May 16, 2005
- Genres: Rock, post-grunge
- Length: 45:46
- Labels: Zoë; Rounder
- Producers: Tracy Bonham; Greg Collins; Ken Rich; Joey Waronker

Tracy Bonham chronology
Down Here (2000)	Blink the Brightest (2005)	Masts of Manhatta (2010)

Professional ratings
Review scores
Source	Rating
AllMusic	4/5 stars
The Encyclopedia of Popular Music	3/5 stars
Entertainment Weekly	B+
PopMatters	8/10
Rolling Stone	3/5 stars

Blink the Brightest is the third album by American singer-songwriter Tracy Bonham. It was released on May 16, 2005, in the UK, and on June 21 in the US.

== Track listing ==
1. "Something Beautiful" (Bonham, Marc Copely, Greg Wells) – 4:17
2. "I Was Born Without You" (Bonham) – 3:45
3. "And The World Has The Nerve To Keep Turning" (Bonham) – 4:46
4. "Eyes" (Bonham) – 3:44
5. "Take Your Love Out On Me" (Bonham) – 4:32
6. "Whether You Fall" (Bonham) – 3:35
7. "Dumbo Sun" (Bonham, Martin Hynes) – 3:31
8. "All Thumbs" (Bonham, Wells) – 2:51
9. "Naked" (Bonham) – 3:57
10. "Shine" (Bonham) – 4:21
11. "Wilting Flower" (Bonham) – 3:04
12. "Did I Sleep Through It All?" (Bonham, Wells) – 3:20

== Personnel ==
- Tracy Bonham – acoustic guitar, piano, violin, electric guitar, vocals, claves, vibraphone, pump organ, fender rhodes, wurlitzer
- Matt Beck – electric guitar
- Greg Collins – acoustic guitar, clarinet, piano, bass guitar, Hammond organ, slide guitar
- Davey Faragher – bass guitar
- Mitchell Froom – piano, vibraphone
- David Levita – bass guitar, electric guitar, slide guitar, 12 string electric guitar, electric baritone guitar
- Ryan MacMillan – drums
- Dan Rothchild – bass guitar
- Sebastian Steinberg – electric guitar, double bass
- Michael Ward – acoustic guitar, electric guitar
- Joey Waronker – percussion, drums
