= The Liverpool Sessions =

EP by Tracy Bonham
- Released: March 7, 1995
- Genre: Rock
- Length: 17:30
- Label: Cherrydisc
- Producer: Josh Hager

Tracy Bonham chronology
The Liverpool Sessions (1995)	The Burdens of Being Upright (1996)

Professional ratings
Review scores
Source	Rating
Allmusic	3/5 stars
CMJ New Music Monthly	favorable

The Liverpool Sessions is the debut EP release of singer-songwriter Tracy Bonham, released in 1995. The Boston Phoenix noted its "stylistic stretches—a torch ballad, psychedelia, a kid's song, hardcore", featuring "the rough-hewn pop gem 'Dandelion', the thrashy, new-wavish '18 Heads Roll By', and the punkish rant 'I'm Not a Waif'." In a Hits Magazine interview, Bonham herself called it "a good record [... but] a rush job and a little immature."

== Track listing ==
1. "Sunshine" (Bonham)
2. "Dandelion" (Bonham)
3. "18 Heads Roll By" (Bonham)
4. "The Real" (Bonham) (later appeared on The Burdens of Being Upright)
5. "Talk" (Bonham, Hager, Nolan, Parsons)
6. "I'm Not a Waif" (Bonham)
7. "Big Foot" (Leach)

== Personnel ==
- Tracy Bonham – guitar, violin, vocals
- Brian Nolan – drums
- Drew Parsons – organ, bass guitar

== Production ==
- Producer: Josh Hager
- Engineer: Paul David Hager
- Assistant engineer: Alex U. Case
- Mixing: Paul David Hager
- Mixing assistant: Alex U. Case
- Mastering: Greg Calbi
- Design: Satori Igarasdhi
