= Mother Mother (song) =

1996 single by Tracy Bonham

Single by Tracy Bonham

from the album The Burdens of Being Upright
- B-side: "50ft Queenie" (live); "Navy Bean" (live)
- Released: March 12, 1996
- Genre: Alternative rock
- Length: 3:00
- Label: Island
- Songwriter: Tracy Bonham
- Producers: Paul Q. Kolderie; Sean Slade

Tracy Bonham singles chronology
"Mother Mother" (1996)	"Sharks Can't Sleep" (1996)

Music video
- "Mother Mother" on YouTube

"Mother Mother" is a song by American musician Tracy Bonham from her debut album, The Burdens of Being Upright (1996). Released on March 12, 1996, it became her most successful single, topping the US Billboard Modern Rock Tracks chart, entering the top five in Australia, and finding success in several other countries, including Canada, New Zealand, and Norway. Several formats of the single contain a live cover version of PJ Harvey's "50ft Queenie" as a B-side.

== Lyrics ==
The song's lyrics resemble a telephone call by a young woman to her mother. The verses detail her experiences with several mundane aspects of her daily life but then the chorus provides an uglier, darker contrast with Bonham screaming the lyrics, leading up to the lines "I'm freezing, I'm starving, I'm bleeding to death, everything's fine! / I miss you, I love you..."

Bonham said the song is based on her experiences as a people-pleasing young woman calling home. She would make poor life choices, yet didn't want her mom to know about it and wanted to pretend everything was fine when they talked on the phone. "It's not an angry, 'I hate you, Mom' song, which a lot of people misunderstood it to be. It was like, 'Yeah, Mom, life is hard,'" said Bonham.

Bonham said her mother and stepfather were actually very accepting of the song. The screaming at the end of the chorus took a toll on Bonham's vocal cords when touring, and she had to cancel several dates on one tour and relearn how to scream it.

== Chart performance ==
"Mother Mother" reached number one on Billboard magazine's Modern Rock Tracks chart in mid-1996. It was the last song by a female solo artist to top this chart until "Royals" by Lorde in August 2013, by which time the chart had been renamed Billboard Alternative Songs. The song was particularly successful in Australia, where it reached number five on the ARIA Singles Chart, received a gold certification from Australian Recording Industry Association (ARIA), and became Australia's 46th best-selling single of 1996. The song also reached number three on the Canadian RPM Alternative 30, number six in Norway, and the top 40 in the Netherlands and New Zealand.

== Music videos ==
Two music videos were shot for the song and were used on both MTV and VH-1:

One video, directed by Jake Scott, was shot for MTV featuring an older woman (Bonham's real life mother) turning on the television on which Tracy's image is singing as the woman proceeds to clean the room. The backing band is seen as well playing in an adjoining dining room.

A second video was shot for more VH-1 in which the entire band including Bonham are in a large clothes closet as she sings into a mirror and then quick shots of her are shown playfully trying on different kinds of women's clothes.

== Track listings ==
US maxi-CD single and UK CD1

1. "Mother Mother" – 3:00
2. "50ft Queenie" (live) – 2:45
3. "Navy Bean" (live) – 2:45

UK CD2

1. "Mother Mother"
2. "Dandelion"
3. "18 Heads Roll By"

UK 7-inch single

A. "Mother Mother" – 3:00
B. "50ft Queenie" (live) – 2:45

European CD single

1. "Mother Mother" (LP version) – 3:00
2. "50ft Queenie" (live at Fort Apache Studio in Cambridge, Massachusetts) – 2:45

Australian maxi-CD single

1. "Mother Mother" – 3:00
2. "Sunshine" – 2:07
3. "The Real" – 3:14

== Charts ==
=== Weekly charts ===
Chart (1996)	Peak position
Australia (ARIA)	5
Belgium (Ultratip Bubbling Under Flanders)	16
Canada Top Singles (RPM)	77
Canada Rock/Alternative (RPM)	3
Netherlands (Dutch Top 40)	32
Netherlands (Single Top 100)	32
New Zealand (Recorded Music NZ)	13
Norway (VG-lista)	6
US Hot 100 Airplay (Billboard)	32
US Mainstream Rock Tracks (Billboard)	18
US Modern Rock Tracks (Billboard)	1

=== Year-end charts ===
Chart (1996)	Position
Australia (ARIA)	46
US Mainstream Rock Tracks (Billboard)	88
US Modern Rock Tracks (Billboard)	15

== Certifications ==
Region	Certification	Certified units/sales
Australia (ARIA)	Gold	35,000^{^}
^{^} Shipments figures based on certification alone.
