= Meathooked =

2016 book by Marta Zaraska

Meathooked: The History and Science of Our 2.5-Million-Year Obsession with Meat
- Cover
- Author: Marta Zaraska
- Language: English
- Subject: History and effects of meat consumption by humans
- Publisher: Basic Books
- Publication date: February 2016
- Media type: Print (hardback & paperback)
- Pages: 263
- ISBN: 978-0-465-03662-2

Meathooked: The History and Science of Our 2.5-Million-Year Obsession with Meat is a book by Polish-Canadian journalist Marta Zaraska. Published in February 2016 by Basic Books, the book is about meat consumption throughout human history, and the health effects of eating meat.

== Critical reception ==
A reviewer for the Green Bay Press-Gazette wrote, "Admitting upfront that she's a vegetarian, Zaraska balances positive and negative points of view in this fascinating exploration. [...] This intriguing, yet technical, title will educate carnivores and vegetarians alike." Author Mark Kurlasky called Meathooked "a pretty good book about meat", stating that, "By examining the positive and negative history of meat rather than vegetarianism, Marta Zaraska leads us to a thoughtful and broad array of issues." Anthropologist and primatologist Richard Wrangham called the book "a well-researched plea for nutritional sanity and ecological common-sense," adding that "Zaraska's sparkling argument for a future with a reduced reliance on meat deserves wide attention."

Chris Nuttall-Smith of The Globe and Mail argued that, while "Zaraska is right, we do eat far too much meat and ought to cut way back," Meathooked utilizes "dubious health data" and "isn't an investigation. It's 200 pages of being trapped in a naugahyde-padded room with a hectoring PETA campaigner who will grasp at any pseudo study or nonsensical quote or misinterpreted data to support her point of view." Diane Leach of PopMatters called the book "a vegetarian manifesto masquerading as scientific journalism". Both Nuttall-Smith and Leach criticized Zaraska's claim that Americans "devour 275 pounds (of meat) a year", with Nuttall-Smith writing that, according to estimates by the United States Department of Agriculture, the actual figure "is 125 pounds annually, or less than half of what Zaraska claims, and it has fallen sharply in recent years."
