= Three (Blue Man Group album) =

Studio album by Blue Man Group
- Released: April 22, 2016
- Recorded: 2014–15
- Length: 49:59
- Label: Rhino
- Producer: Andrew Schneider; Jeff Turlik

Blue Man Group chronology
The Complex (2003)	Three (2016)

Three is the third studio album by Blue Man Group, released on April 22, 2016 by Rhino Entertainment.

== Reception ==
Reviews were generally positive. Allan Raible said "it may not be for everyone but as on their other two studio offerings the Blue Men show themselves to be gifted musicians." David Seigler said "It has an interesting, mostly rhythmic sound that is identifiably their own."

Simon Sweetmas said "I think Three is easily Blue Man Group’s best set of recordings, and best showcase for the dynamic maximalism the troupe offers" Cristine Struble praised the use of traditional wooden instruments with modern plastic ones.

== Promotion ==
They performed "Vortex" and "The Forge" at a Tiny Desk Concert in September 2016.

== Track listing ==
No.	Title	Length
1.	"Dispatches 1"	1:21
2.	"The Forge"	3:33
3.	"Hex Suit"	3:33
4.	"3 To 1"	4:13
5.	"Alive"	2:57
6.	"Snorkelbone"	3:01
7.	"Cimbalom 9"	4:40
8.	"Robots"	5:10
9.	"Creature Feature"	3:34
10.	"Vortex"	3:47
11.	"Tone Spokes"	2:59
12.	"Dispatches 2"	1:38
13.	"Giacometti"	4:21
14.	"Torus"	5:12

== Personnel ==
- Vince Verderame, Corky Gainsford – drums
- Todd Perlmutter – drums, percussion programming
- Todd Waetzig, Jordan Cohen, Jeff Tortora – drums
- Chris Dyas – baritone guitar, guitar, zither
- Jeff Turlik – guitar, synths, berimbau, bass
- Chris Bowen – tubulum
- Byron Estep – chapman stick
- Brian Scott – cimbalom
- Doug Baldinger – drums
- Bill Swartz – drums
- Richard Phillis - drums
- Steve Ballstadt – shaker, udu
- Marivaldo Dos Santos – timbau, triangle
- Yusuke Yamamoto – vibraphone
- Jeff Quay – bongo, caxixi
- Matt Ramsey – PCV
- Rob Swift – samples
- Mike Relm – turntables
- Mark Frankel – drums, spider drums, phoenix drums, logs
- Dave Steele – zither, guitar
- Josh Matthews – mandeldrums
- Phil Stanton – cimbalom, piano smasher
- Dorothy McMillan – voice
- Geoff Gersh – zither
- Larry Heinemann – lap steel, programming
- Clement J Waldman III – drums
- Super Natsuki Tamura – didjeridoo
