= Tracy Bonham =

American musician (born 1967)

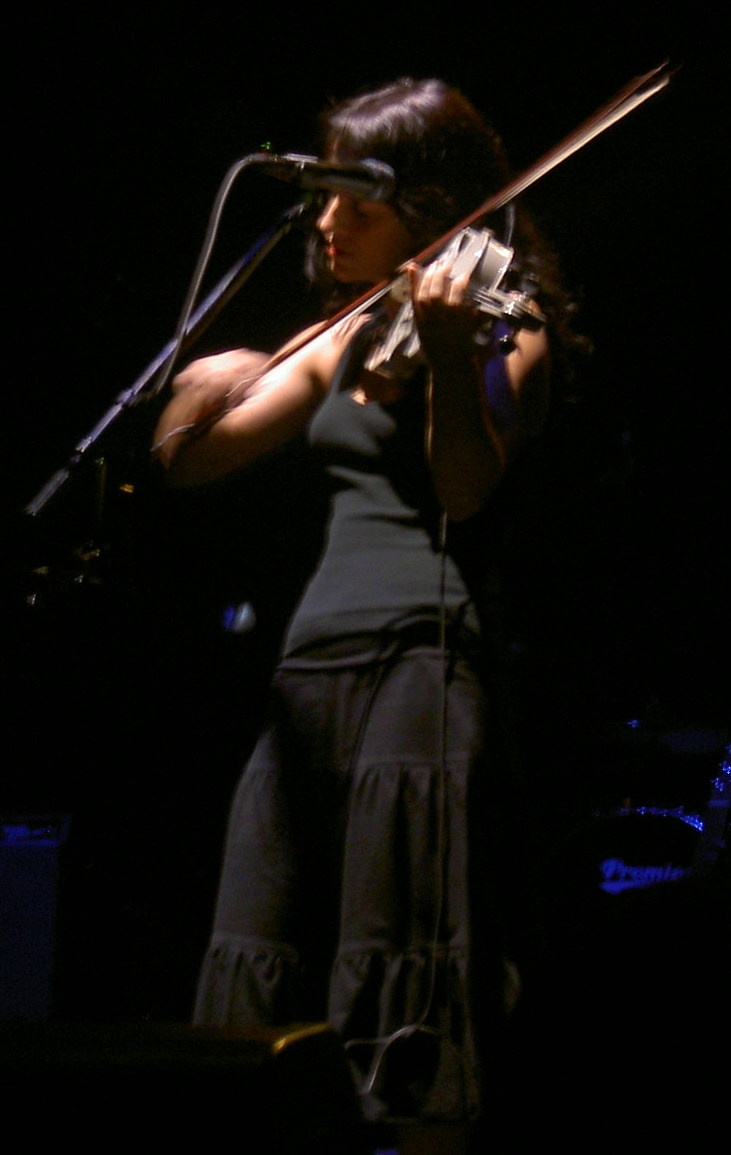
- Tracy Bonham performing at Webster Hall in 2005

Background information
- Born: Tracy Kristin Bonham; March 16, 1967 (age 59); Eugene, Oregon, U.S.
- Origin: Boston, Massachusetts, U.S.
- Genre: Alternative rock
- Occupations: Singer; songwriter; instrumentalist
- Instruments: Vocals; violin; piano; guitar
- Years active: 1994–present
- Labels: CherryDisc; Island; Zoë; Engine Room; Lojinx; A Woody Hollow
- Website: tracybonham.com

Tracy Kristin Bonham (born March 16, 1967) is an American alternative rock musician. Born and raised in Eugene, Oregon, she is a classically trained violinist and pianist, and a self-taught guitarist.

After building up a local following around Boston, Bonham signed to Island Records in 1995. Her debut album, The Burdens of Being Upright (1996), was a critical and commercial success and earned her two Grammy nominations, in addition to being certified Gold by the Recording Industry Association of America (RIAA) less than a year after its release. The album's lead single, "Mother Mother", topped the Billboard Alternative Airplay chart in June 1996. She was the last female solo artist to top this chart until Lorde in 2013. Delays plagued the release of her second album, Down Here (2000), which failed to chart internationally; Bonham parted ways with Island a year after the album's release, after which she turned her attention to working with other musical artists, including The Blue Man Group when she appeared in their The Complex Rock Tour Live tour and live DVD in 2003.

In 2004, Bonham signed to the Rounder Records imprint Zoë Records, with whom she issued her third album Blink the Brightest (2005). She has since worked with various other record labels and released three more albums, Masts of Manhatta (2010), Wax & Gold (2015) and Modern Burdens (2017), the last of which is a re-recording of The Burdens of Being Upright.

== Early life ==
Tracy Kristin Bonham was born in Eugene, Oregon, on March 16, 1967, the only child of Donald Lewis Bonham and Lee Anne Leach. Her father was the city editor of The Eugene Register-Guard, and her mother was a music teacher; the two had met while Leach was attending the University of Oregon. Bonham's father died when she was two years old, and her mother remarried five years later to Edward Robert Robertson, a mortgage loan officer. She was the youngest of the nine half and/or step-siblings she grew up with.

Bonham was trained as a classical musician; she began singing at the age of five, and playing the violin at nine. When she was 16 years old, she enrolled at Interlochen Arts Camp in Michigan, but was expelled after three weeks for smoking cigarettes. She later graduated at South Eugene High School and received a full scholarship to the University of Southern California for violin. After becoming burnt out from composing, she transferred to the Berklee College of Music in Boston, Massachusetts to study voice in 1987. While there, she took up various jobs at places such as the Atlantic Fish Company, a cassette duplication service, and wrote jingles for Pontiac and Toyota car dealerships.

== Career ==
=== Early success, Island Records and The Burdens of Being Upright (1994–1997) ===
In 1994, Bonham started writing music and released her first song, "The One", which appeared on the compilation album Girl, released through the Boston-based Curve of the Earth label. Thereafter, she sent a four-song demo tape (featuring "The One") to Brett Milano, music critic of The Boston Phoenix, in June 1994; Milano praised the demo, and a major label bidding war occurred shortly thereafter. In 1995, Bonham issued her debut EP, The Liverpool Sessions, through the CherryDisc label, which brought her additional local acclaim; after its release, she signed to Island Records.

After recording at Fort Apache Studio in Cambridge for several months, in 1996 Bonham released her debut full-length album The Burdens of Being Upright. Magazines such as Rolling Stone and People noted her bold approach to rock music. The album went gold within six months and later that year she was nominated for the Grammy Awards for Best Alternative Music Performance and Best Female Rock Vocal Performance (for "Mother Mother"). She then went on an extensive tour in support of the album.

The album's first single, "Mother Mother", reached number one on the Billboard Modern Rock Tracks chart (later known as Alternative Airplay chart) in June 1996, and remained there for a month; Bonham subsequently became the first female solo artist to achieve this feat, and was the last one to do so until Lorde reached the same position with her single "Royals" in 2013. The song's music video won the award for Best Video at the 1996 Boston Music Awards, and also received nominations at the MTV Music Video Awards in 1997 for Best New Artist in a Video. The second single, "The One", was a minor hit and peaked at No. 23 on the Modern Rock Tracks chart, and two different music video versions of the song were briefly in heavy rotation on video music channels MTV and VH1. The third and final single, "Sharks Can't Sleep" failed to chart in the US, although it became her highest-charting single in the United Kingdom, where it reached number 93.

=== Record label issues and Down Here (1998–2000) ===
After the mild success of her first album, Bonham commenced work on a second studio album in 1997 with Mitchell Froom and Tchad Blake. Bonham hoped to make an album that would better reflect her classical influences and serve as a more mature outing. The album, then known as Trails of a Dust Devil, was finished in the spring of 1998, but executives at Island were unhappy with the album as they did not feel like it had a hit single. Reluctantly, Bonham returned to writing new, more commercial-sounding songs, including "Behind Every Good Woman". Satisfied, Island then set a release date for the album of October 1998.

However, in May 1998, Island Records' parent company, PolyGram, was purchased by beverage giant Seagram for $10.6 billion; as part of Seagram's purchase, PolyGram was merged into Universal Music Group, and Island Records was reconsolidated into The Island Def Jam Music Group umbrella label. The restructurings delayed the release of the album to 1999. Most of the people Bonham had worked with at Island had left the company during the merger, and the label's new management asked her to write another hit single; in response, Bonham wrote "Fake It". The album was then pushed back to the spring of 2000, by which time it had been renamed Down Here.

Down Here was released on April 18, 2000. The album received generally positive reviews, but struggled to find an audience in a musical climate dominated by nu metal, and experienced virtually no radio airplay. The album and its only single, "Behind Every Good Woman" failed to appear on any sales charts worldwide, leaving her on uncertain terms with Island. Down Here would be Bonham's final album for Island; in December 2001, whilst she was in the studio preparing to record her third album, the label released her from her recording contract. Bonham cited Island Records' changing musical direction as the primary reason why she was cut from the label.

=== Other activities and Bee EP (2001–2003) ===
She then left studio recording behind and began to tour in support of other groups such as the performance group Blue Man Group and even rock band Aerosmith. In 2003 she recorded and released an independent EP titled Bee. It included early versions of "Shine" and "All Thumbs" and a live version of "Freed" (from Down Here), and a cover of Led Zeppelin's "Black Dog", where she substituted violin solos for the signature lead guitar line in the original.

She had only pressed 1,000 hoping to sell 500, but she eventually sold over 12,000 of the EP's while on the various tours. With the money made from the EP she returned to the studio to start work on her third full-length LP in Los Angeles, California. (The Bee EP was later re-issued in Europe as the Something Beautiful EP with the addition of a track titled "Blink the Brightest" and a bonus DVD with live performances.)

=== Blink the Brightest and In The City + In The Woods (2004–2009) ===
In 2004, she signed with Rounder Records, whose CEO, John Virant, was a longtime fan and spent over three years convincing Tracy to trust a record company again.

In 2005, she released her third album Blink the Brightest through the more pop-oriented Zoe label of Rounder. It was recorded in L.A., where she has lived part-time since 2003. She co-produced the bulk of the album with Greg Collins (U2, No Doubt, Matchbox Twenty); Joey Waronker, who has drummed for R.E.M. and Beck, co-produced four tracks.

Along with Bonham, the players included drummers Waronker and Butch (of Eels), bassists Sebastian Steinberg (from Soul Coughing & Neil Finn) and Davey Faragher (having performed for Elvis Costello, Sheryl Crow), guitarists Joe Gore (from Tom Waits, P.J. Harvey) and Dave Levita (Alanis Morissette, Jewel) and keyboard player Mitchell Froom (Paul McCartney, Los Lobos).

She performed on The Tonight Show with Jay Leno and The Late Late Show with Craig Ferguson, and her new songs were featured on XM Radio's The Loft Channel.

While in upstate New York in the late fall of 2006, Bonham released the EP In The City + In The Woods, her second self-funded EP. The 11-track disc featured two studio tracks, a cover version of Beyoncé Knowles's "Crazy In Love" and an original titled "In My Other Life". The rest of the songs are live tracks, which include some older favorites – "One Hit Wonder" and a new version of "Navy Bean" – covers ("Blue Jay Way" & "Kissing The Lipless"), and previously unreleased material ("Your World Turns Upside Down", "The Idiot In Me").

=== Masts of Manhatta and Pure McCartney (2010–2014) ===
From 2007 to 2009, Bonham recorded songs for her new album in Woodstock. The 2010 album, titled Masts of Manhatta, was produced by Bonham and mixed by Tchad Blake, and was released under the New York City indie label Engine Room Recordings in the United States and on Lojinx Records in the UK. This period of Bonham's life was chronicled in a Billboard article in which Bonham and then-manager Darren Paltrowitz were interviewed about Masts of Manhatta.

In celebration of Paul McCartney's 70th birthday on June 18, 2012, Bonham, Mike Viola and Danish singer Tim Christensen performed the Ram album with The Damn Crystals at Vega in Copenhagen.

=== Wax & Gold and Modern Burdens (2015–present) ===
After 2015's Wax & Gold, Bonham released a re-recorded version of her debut album entitled Modern Burdens in 2017.

== Personal life ==
Between 1998 and 2001, Bonham was married to Steve Slingeneyer of the band Soulwax. As of 2010, she lives in Brooklyn, New York City. Between 2006 and 2021 she was married to Rolling Stone editor Jason Fine. In January 2024, Bonham was diagnosed with stage 1 lobular breast cancer. A few weeks after, she underwent a lumpectomy and lymph gland removal and was declared cancer free.

== Discography ==
=== Studio albums ===
List of studio albums, with selected chart positions and sales figures
Title	Album details	Peak chart positions							Certifications
Title	Album details	US	US Heat.	AUS	NLD	NOR	NZ	SWE	Certifications
The Burdens of Being Upright	Released: March 19, 1996; Label: Island; Format: CD, CS, LP	54	9	31	26	27	46	48	RIAA: Gold
Down Here	Released: April 18, 2000; Label: Island; Format: CD, CS	—	—	—	—	—	—	—	
Blink the Brightest	Released: June 21, 2005; Label: Zoë Records; Format: CD, DD	—	—	—	—	—	—	—	
Masts of Manhatta	Released: July 13, 2010; Label: Engine Room; Format: CD, DD	—	—	—	—	—	—	—	
Wax & Gold	Released: August 21, 2015; Label: A Woody Hollow; Format: CD, LP, DD	—	—	—	—	—	—	—	
Modern Burdens	Released: June 16, 2017; Label: A Woody Hollow; Format: CD, LP, DD	—	—	—	—	—	—	—	
Sky Too Wide	Released: May 30, 2025; Label: A Woody Hollow; Format: CD, LP	—	—	—	—	—	—	—	
"—" denotes a recording that did not chart or was not released in that territory.

=== EPs ===
Title	Album details
The Liverpool Sessions	Released: March 7, 1995; Label: CherryDisc; Format: CD, CS, LP
Bee	Released: November 20, 2003; Label: Self-released; Format: CD
Something Beautiful	Released: 2005; Label: Zoë Records; Format: CD+DVD
In the City/In the Woods	Released: April 26, 2007; Label: Self-released; Format: CD
All I Wish Every Christmas	Released: December 10, 2013; Label: Self-released; Format: DD
My Big Red Heart Beats for You	Released: February 6, 2015; Label: Self-released; Format: DD

=== Live ===
- Pure McCartney (2013)

=== Singles ===
List of singles, with selected chart positions and certifications, showing year released and album name
Title	Year	Peak chart positions									Certifications	Album
Title	Year	US Main.	US Mod.	US Radio	AUS	CAN	NOR	NLD	NZ	UK	Certifications	Album
"Dandelion"	1995	—	—	—	—	—	—	—	—	—		The Liverpool Sessions
"Sunshine"	1995	—	—	—	—	—	—	—	—	—		The Liverpool Sessions
"Mother Mother"	1996	18	1	32	5	77	6	32	13	138	ARIA: Gold	The Burdens of Being Upright
"The One"	1996	—	23	—	—	—	—	92	—	—		The Burdens of Being Upright
"Sharks Can't Sleep"	1996	—	—	—	—	—	—	—	—	93		The Burdens of Being Upright
"Behind Every Good Woman"	2000	—	—	—	—	—	—	—	—	—		Down Here
"Something Beautiful"	2005	—	—	—	—	—	—	—	—	—		Blink the Brightest
"Shine"	2005	—	—	—	—	—	—	—	—	—		Blink the Brightest
"Eyes"	2005	—	—	—	—	—	—	—	—	—		Blink the Brightest
"Big Red Heart"	2010	—	—	—	—	—	—	—	—	—		Masts of Manhatta
"Luck"	2015	—	—	—	—	—	—	—	—	—		Wax & Gold
"—" denotes releases that did not chart or were not released in that territory.

Digital releases

- "Carry Me Home" – 2008 (Website download)
- "Your Night Is Wide Open" – 2008 (Website download)
- "The Size of My Fist" – 2008 (available on iTunes)
- "The Indelible Man" – 2008 (available on iTunes)
- "In My Heart (Bill Withers cover)" – 2009 (available on iTunes and the compilation album "Before The Goldrush")
- "The Hugger, The Screamer, and Me" – 2009 (Website download)
- "In The Pines (Leadbelly cover)" – 2011 (Website download)

Appears on album

- Pure McCartney Live with Tim Christensen and The Damn Crystals

== Awards and nominations ==
The Boston Phoenix/WFNX Best Music Poll

Year	Nominee / work	Award	Result
1995	Herself	Best Local Female Vocalist	Won
1995	Herself	Best Local New Artist	Won
1995	"The One"	Best Local Song	Nominated
1996	Herself	Best Local Female Vocalist	Won

Boston Music Awards

Year	Nominee / work	Award	Result
1995	The Liverpool Sessions	Outstanding Debut Rock Album (indie label)	Won
1995	"Dandelion"	Outstanding Rock Single (indie)	Won
1995	Herself	Outstanding Local Female Vocalist	Won
1996	The Burdens of Being Upright	Debut Album of the Year	Won
1996	"Mother Mother"	Single of the Year	Won
1996	Herself	Best Female Vocalist	Won
1996	"Mother Mother"	Best Music Video	Won

MTV Video Music Awards

Year	Nominee / work	Award	Result
1996	"Mother Mother"	Best New Artist in a Video	Nominated

Grammy Awards

Year	Nominee / work	Award	Result
1997	The Burdens of Being Upright	Best Alternative Music Performance	Nominated
1997	"Mother Mother"	Best Female Rock Vocal Performance	Nominated
