= Venus Hum =

American electronic pop group

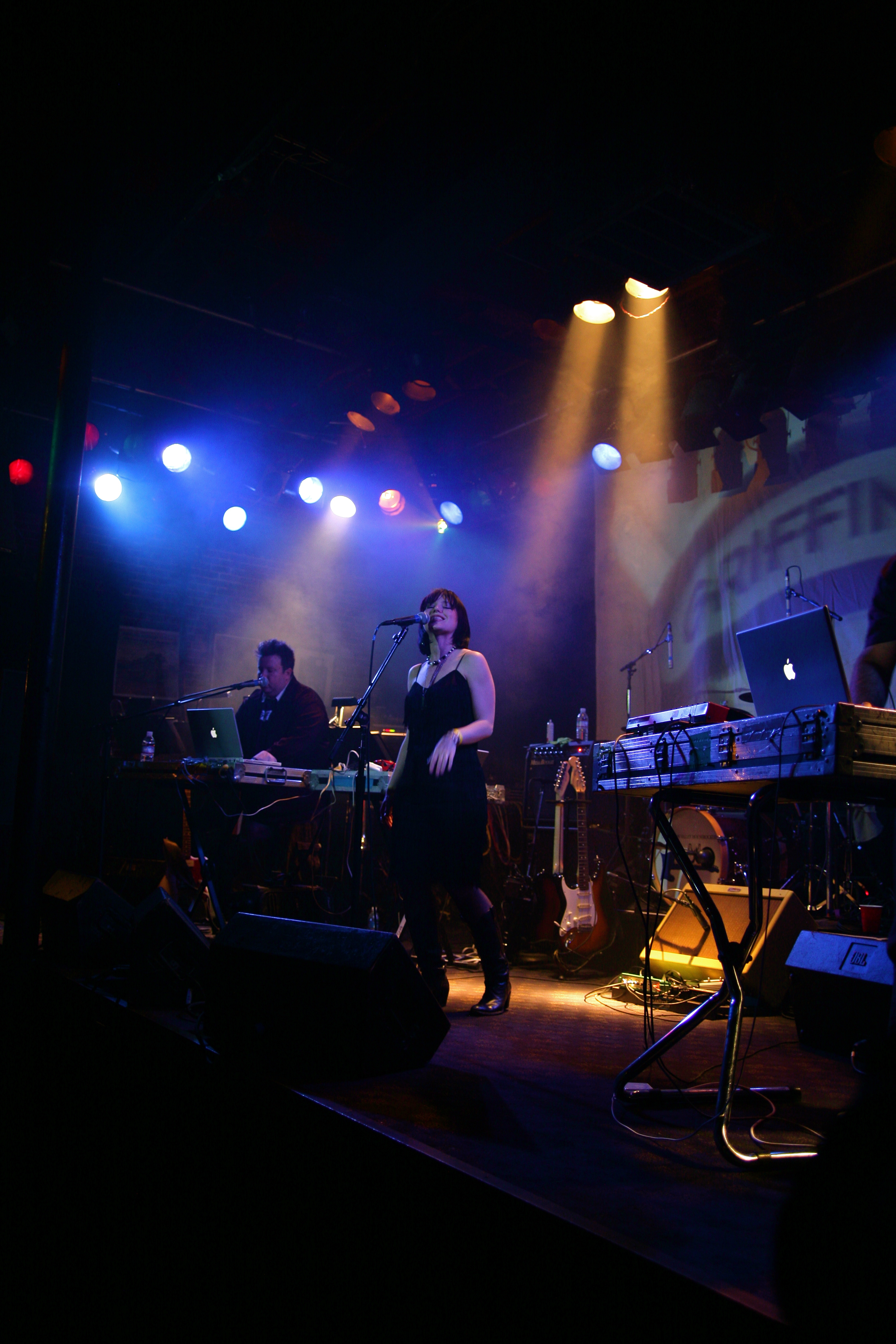
- Venus Hum in 2008

Background information
- Origin: Nashville, Tennessee, United States
- Genres: Electronic, pop
- Years active: 1999 –present
- Labels: MCA, Nettwerk
- Website: venushum.com

Venus Hum is an electronic pop music group from Nashville, Tennessee, consisting of vocalist Annette Strean and multi-instrumentalists Kip Kubin and Tony Miracle. Miracle has a rare heart condition which results in perpetually hearing his own heartbeat in his ears. This condition is known as "venous hum", from which the group's name is derived.

Their first full-length album, titled Venus Hum, was released in 2001. They toured in 2002. Big Beautiful Sky was released in 2003. Also in 2003, Venus Hum toured with and opened for Blue Man Group, with Strean providing vocals on "I Feel Love".

After their collaboration with J. J. Abrams (Alias, Lost, Mission: Impossible III), and their subsequent creation of the EP Songs for Superheroes, it was uncertain whether Venus Hum would release any new material. Strean had developed painful vocal fold nodules and needed a speech pathologist to relearn her singing ability. Kip diversified, furthering his interest in filmmaking, becoming a director of music videos, electronic press kits and special features. Tony traveled, living in Los Angeles and Cincinnati and releasing an experimental solo album under the moniker "Satellite City".

After a two-year hiatus, the group reorganized and released a new album, The Colors in the Wheel on July 25, 2006, under the Mono-Fi Records label, which they described as "unconventional, three-dimensional and completely five-sensual" featuring an edgier sound than their previous work.

In the second half of 2008, Venus Hum returned to the studio to work on material for a new album, culminating in the October 6th, 2009 release of Mechanics & Mathematics. Best Remodeled, a remix album, was released on November 18, 2016. From July through December 2020, the band released a series of singles which were later included on the album Kindness Rages On, released on August 23, 2021.

== Blue Man Group ==
Annette Strean provided vocals for Blue Man Group's cover of "I Feel Love" on their 2003 album The Complex. Venus Hum opened for Blue Man Group on The Complex Rock Tour, and performed with them as well. The band was featured as "rock concert movement number sixty-three." "I Feel Love" was released as a single in 2004.

== Discography ==
=== Studio albums ===
- Venus Hum (April 24, 2001)
- Big Beautiful Sky (April 1, 2003)
- The Colors in the Wheel (July 25, 2006)
- Mechanics & Mathematics (October 6, 2009)
- Kindness Rages On (August 23, 2021)

=== Remix albums ===
- Best Remodeled (November 18, 2016)

=== EPs ===
- Promo Fun Kit (1999)
- Switched on Christmas (2000)
- Hummingbirds (CD and vinyl) (October 22, 2002)
- Songs for Superheroes (January 1, 2004)
- Yes and No (2006)
- Pink Champagne (2006)
- Surgery in the Sky (2007)

=== Singles ===
- "Montana" (CD and vinyl) (2003)
- "Soul Sloshing" (CD and vinyl) (2003)
- "Long Live the Lady" (2020)
- "Christmas & You" (2020) (streaming only)
- "Dust" (2020)
- "Look" (2020)
- "Whether or Not" (2020)
- "Where You Are" (2020)
- "Sing Like a Bird" (2022)
- "Carol of the Bells" / "Carol of the Bells (Instrumental)" (2022) (streaming only)
- "Busy is the New Fine" (2023)
- "I Feel Love" (2023)
- "Cold is Clean" (2023)
- "Crash Into You" (2025)
- "Subtle" (2025)
