= The Complex (album) =

Studio album by Blue Man Group
- Released: April 22, 2003
- Recorded: 2002–2003
- Length: 58:41
- Labels: Lava; Atlantic
- Producers: Todd Perlmutter, Matt Goldman, Phil Stanton, Chris Wink

Blue Man Group chronology
Audio (1999)	The Complex (2003)	Las Vegas 4 Song Sampler (2005)

Blue Man Group studio album chronology
Audio (1999)	The Complex (2003)	Three (2016)

Singles from The Complex
- 1. "The Current" Released: March 14, 2003; 2. "I Feel Love" Released: May 15, 2003; 3. "Sing Along" Released: June 6, 2003

Professional ratings
Aggregate scores
Source	Rating
Metacritic	60/100
Review scores
Source	Rating
AllMusic	4/5 stars
E!	C
Entertainment Weekly	C−
Now	2/5 stars
Q	3.5/5 stars
Rolling Stone	3.5/5 stars

The Complex is the second studio album by Blue Man Group, released in 2003. It is a concept album that takes place in two separate worlds: the world of the rock concert, as in the song "Time to Start," and the alienating world of the modern urban workplace, as in the songs "Sing Along," "The Current", and "The Complex." Both worlds are then tied together in the song "What Is Rock," which contrasts the celebratory "loss of identity" within a rock performance with the dehumanizing "loss of identity" within the workplace. These themes were illustrated during performance by animations that told the story of a faceless worker eventually escaping "up to the roof" and discovering their true self.

The Complex produced three singles, and debuted at #60 on the Billboard charts. As with the previous album, a DVD-Audio version was released, containing a high-definition (96 kHz/24-bit) 5.1 surround sound mix. AllMusic reviewer Robert L. Doerschuk states "Although its inspirations, musical and conceptual, trace as far back as Kraftwerk, The Complex serves as a reminder that modern devices and glistening production values can be applied to the most primal creative instincts, if utilized by the right — blue — hands".

== Track listing ==
The Complex
No.	Title	Writer(s)	Length
1.	"Above"	Dyas, Goldman, Heinemann, Pai, Perlmutter, Stanton, Wink	2:46
2.	"Time to Start"	Dyas, Goldman, Stanton, Wink	3:43
3.	"Sing Along" (featuring Dave Matthews)	Dyas, Goldman, Stanton, Wink	3:25
4.	"Up to the Roof" (featuring Tracy Bonham)	Dyas, Gleitsman, Goldman, Heinemann, Perlmutter, Stanton, Wink	3:51
5.	"Your Attention"	Dyas, Goldman, Heinemann, Pai, Perlmutter, Stanton, Wink	4:09
6.	"Persona" (featuring Josh Haden)	Dyas, Gleitsman, Goldman, Stanton, Wink	4:30
7.	"Piano Smasher"	Dyas, Golden, Goldman, Perlmutter, Stanton, Wink	3:00
8.	"White Rabbit" (featuring Esthero)	Grace Slick	2:54
9.	"The Current" (featuring Gavin Rossdale)	Dyas, Gleitsman, Goldman, Stanton, Wink	3:48
10.	"Shadows, Pt. 2" (featuring Tracy Bonham and Rob Swift)	Dyas, Gleitsman, Goldman, Perlmutter, Stanton, Wink	2:56
11.	"What Is Rock" (featuring Arone Dyer and Peter Moore)	Dyas, Gleitsman, Goldman, Stanton, Wink	3:11
12.	"The Complex" (featuring Peter Moore)	Dyas, Gleitsman, Goldman, Heinemann, Stanton, Wink	6:25
13.	"I Feel Love" (featuring Annette Strean of Venus Hum)	Bellotte, Moroder, Summer	5:13
14.	"Exhibit 13"	Banks, Dyas, Goldman, Heinemann, Parrulli, Stanton, Wink	4:01
15.	"Mandelbrot No. 4" (hidden track)		4:19
Total length:			58:41

== Personnel ==
- Matt Goldman, Phil Stanton, Chris Wink (CMP) - founders
- Chris Dyas - baritone guitar, e-bow, guitar, harpsichord, zither
- Larry Heinemann - bass, chapman stick, guitar, pressaphonic, tubulum, zither
- Todd Perlmutter - drums, narrator (2,5,11), percussion programming
- Blue Man - airpoles, anvil, backpack tubulum, big drum, cimbalom, cuica, dogulum, drumulum, dulcimer, dumpster, mandeldrums, mellotron cello, paddle tubulum, percussion, piano smasher, PVC instrument, tubulum, 1981 casiotone and kazoo.
- Tracy Bonham - vocals (4,10)
- Arone Dyer - vocals (11)
- Esthero - vocals (8)
- Josh Haden - vocals (6)
- Dave Matthews - vocals (3)
- Peter Moore - vocals (11,12), keyboards (15)
- Gavin Rossdale - vocals (9)
- Annette Strean and Venus Hum - vocals and effects (13)
- Rob Swift - turntables (10)
- Dave Anania - percussion (11)
- Chris Bowen - tubulum (13), voiceover (11)
- Nels Cline - guitar (6,8-10,13)
- Dan the Automator - programming (3,9)
- Jeffrey Doornbos - tubulum (13)
- Byron Estep - dobro guitar (5)
- Brooke Ferris - start voice (2), "words on the left" (5)
- Avram Gleitsman - guitar (9)
- Spalding Gray - "words on the right" (5)
- Kid Koala - samples (11)
- Elvis Lederer - zither (5,15)
- Ian Pai - percussion (1,2,5,10,15)
- Jeff Quay - percussion & double drum kit (5,6,12,15)
- Brian Scott - tubulum (13)
- Dave Steele - guitar (4,8,9,12), zither (4,12)
- Rob Swift - turntable (5,10)
- Chris Traynor - guitar (9)
- Jeff Turlik - guitar (1,2,5,8,9,12-15), zither (14,15)
- Todd Waetzig - percussion (11)
- Jordan Cohen, Matthew Kriemelman, Jeff Tortora, Vince Verderame, Todd Waetzig, Nick White - Vegas Drum Army (1,2,5,6,7 & 13)
- Dave Anania, Chris Bowen, Wes Day, Jeffrey Doornbos, Randall Jaynes, Josh Matthews, Ian Pai, Crag Rodriguez, Pete Simpson, Pete Starrett, Clem Waldman - NY Drum Army (2,5,15)

=== Production ===
- Producers: Todd Perlmutter, Matt Goldman, Phil Stanton, Chris Wink
- Executive producer: Jeff Skillen
- Engineers: Bill Bookheim, Joe Hogan, Joe O'Connell, Todd Perlmutter, Andrew Schneider
- Mixing: Rich Costey, Andrew Schneider
- Mastering: Bob Ludwig
- Production supervisor: Jeff Levison
- Production coordination: Jaime Ramírez
- Product development: Michael Quinn, Jeni Ardizzone West
- Programming: Dan the Automator, Todd Perlmutter
- Computer engineering: Larry Heinemann
- Vocal producers: Kip Kubin, Tony Miracle, Venus Hum
- Sampling: Kid Koala
- Arrangers: Peter Moore, Ian Pai, Dave Steele, Jeff Turlik
- Studio assistant: Mike Napolitano
- Art consultant: Dan the Automator
- Technician: Mike Napolitano
- Drum technician: Carl Plaster
- Art direction: Marcus Miller, Charles Tyler Ensemble
- Design: Jen Graffam Wink
- Artwork: David Bell
- Cover image: Jen Graffam Wink

== Charts ==
=== Album ===
Chart (2003)	Peak position
Billboard 200	60
Billboard Top Internet Albums	60

=== Songs ===
Year	Song	Chart	Position
2003	"Sing Along"	Adult Top 40	37
2004	"I Feel Love"	Hot Dance Club Play	7
