= Kip Kubin =

American film director and producer

Kip Kubin (born March 4, 1965) is an American film director, producer, writer, musician, and sound designer.

He is best known for being in the band Venus Hum (MCA Records, BMG Records, and Universal Records) but transitioned to directing and writing narrative films in 2013.

== Awards ==
In 2011, he was nominated for a Dove Award for Short Form Music Video of the Year for Amy Grant's "Better Than a Hallelujah".

== Filmography ==
Kubin has directed a handful of acclaimed short films, including Each Time Again (2013) and Seraphim (2014). In 2013, he also directed the short film A Walk for Andrei.

Year	Short Film	Director
2013	A Walk for Andrei	Kip Kubin
2013	Each Time Again	Kip Kubin
2014	Seraphim	Kip Kubin

== Personal life ==
Kip lives in Nashville, Tennessee.
