= Down Here =

Studio album by Tracy Bonham
- Released: April 18, 2000
- Recorded: March 1998 – December 1999
- Studios: House Of Blues; NRG (Hollywood); Sunset Sound (Los Angeles); Magic Shop (New York City)
- Genres: Alternative rock; post-grunge
- Length: 42:03
- Label: Island
- Producers: Tracy Bonham; Tchad Blake; Mitchell Froom; Mark Endert; Don Gilmore

Tracy Bonham chronology
The Burdens of Being Upright (1996)	Down Here (2000)	Blink the Brightest (2005)

Alternative covers
- Cover of the promo version of the album with its original title, Trail of a Dust Devil

Singles from Down Here
- 1. "Behind Every Good Woman" Released: March 7, 2000

Down Here is the second studio album by American singer-songwriter Tracy Bonham, released on April 18, 2000, through Island Records. The album was recorded between March 1998 and December 1999 by Bonham and producers Mitchell Froom, Tchad Blake, Mark Endert and Don Gilmore. The album was supposed to be released in October 1998 under the title Trail of a Dust Devil, but was delayed until the spring of 2000, as Island was going through a major restructuring.

Down Here received generally positive reviews from critics. However, the album struggled to find an audience in a musical climate dominated by nu metal, and it experienced virtually no radio airplay. The album and its only single, "Behind Every Good Woman" failed to appear on any sales charts worldwide. Down Here was Bonham's final album for Island.

== Background and recording ==
In 1996, Tracy Bonham released her gold-selling debut album The Burdens of Being Upright. Following several tours in support of the album, Bonham began recording a follow-up to the album in March 1998, at the Magic Shop in New York City with producers Mitchell Froom and Tchad Blake. Bonham said that she chose to work with them "for their credibility and for the way they make records 'sound.' " The recording sessions with Froom and Blake, which were completed by May 1998, were worked on with the assistance of bassist Sebastian Steinberg and drummers Pete Thomas and Steve Slingeneyer. After recording concluded, Bonham embarked on a warm-up tour for the album—then known as Trail of a Dust Devil—and in anticipation of its planned October 1998 release.

Bonham's record label, Island Records, was anxious about her working with Froom and Blake as both of them "were not known as hitmakers". Although the label did not interfere with its recording (due to Froom's refusal to allow any of its personnel into the studio), they were able to pressure Bonham into writing more commercial songs for the album. As she was writing potential hit singles, Island's parent company PolyGram was merged into Universal Music Group, resulting in the label's consolidation into the Island Def Jam Music Group. The merger led to the album being delayed into 1999. Frustrated, Bonham relocated from Boston to New York City, where she wrote "Behind Every Good Woman". She would record the song, along with "Freed", in early 1999 with producer Mark Endert, who engineered Fiona Apple's debut album Tidal (1996), in order to "get new life into what I was doing". Island responded enthusiastically to "Behind Every Good Woman"; according to Bonham, "When I played them [the song], they were high-fiving each other and saying, 'This is it, this is the anthem. Thank you for giving us this one—now we finally have the record we need".

Amidst further corporate shakeups which saw most of the people she worked with at the label leave, Island Records' new management requested that Bonham write a "second single"—in between an already selected "first" and "third"—for the album. In December 1999, she recorded "Fake It" with producer Don Gilmore at Scream Studios in Los Angeles, after which the album was delayed—for a final time—to the spring of 2000. Bonham was ultimately able to keep nine of the songs she recorded with Froom and Blake on the final album, whilst cutting its track list down from fifteen to twelve songs by removing "love ballads" that she said were written about Slingeneyer, her fiancé at the time. Prior to its release, Bonham would also change the album's title to Down Here, although some promotional copies bear its original title. Bonham said: "I didn't want to sound too bitter. The first title was my concept of the music business, like a dust devil sweeping through a deserted land. When I thought about that, I decided I didn't want to go there."

== Reception ==
Professional ratings
Review scores
Source	Rating
AllMusic	4/5 stars
The Encyclopedia of Popular Music	4/5 stars
Entertainment Weekly	A−
Knoxville News Sentinel	3.5/5 stars
New Zealand Herald	3/5 stars
Now	4/5 stars
PopMatters	7.5/10
Spin	5/10
Toronto Sun	4/5 stars
Wall of Sound	79/100

Stephen Thomas Erlewine of AllMusic wrote: "Though it occasionally sounds a little out of time -- it's a record that would have made more sense in 1997 than in 2000 -- Down Here is a record that reveals much of its strengths only with repeated listens, and that's part of the problem. Apart from the hardcore fans that have stuck with her for five years, not many people will give it a chance. If they do, they'll find that it's a smart, assured, and distinctive second effort that is a quantum leap past her debut." The New Zealand Herald wrote that the "trouble is perhaps, that for all Bonham's musical craftiness (and her violin-playing which saws through a few tracks) and attitude, she's not that memorable, especially melodically." The Los Angeles Times thought that the album "collects music that is even richer and more distinctive" than the debut.

== Track listing ==
All tracks are written by Tracy Bonham.

No.	Title	Producer(s)	Length
1.	"Freed"	Mark Endert	4:25
2.	"Behind Every Good Woman"	Endert	3:24
3.	"You Don't Know Me"	Mitchell Froom; Tchad Blake; Tracy Bonham	3:24
4.	"Fake It"	Don Gilmore	3:33
5.	"Cold Day In Hell"	Froom; Blake; Bonham	3:41
6.	"Jumping Bean"	Froom; Blake; Bonham	3:45
7.	"Oasis Hotel"	Froom; Blake; Bonham	0:47
8.	"Second Wind"	Froom; Blake; Bonham	3:01
9.	"Thumbelina"	Froom; Blake; Bonham	4:14
10.	"Meathook"	Froom; Blake; Bonham	3:07
11.	"You Can't Always Not Get What You Don't Want"	Froom; Blake; Bonham	3:53
12.	"Give Us Something to Feel"	Bonham	4:29
Total length:			42:03

== Personnel ==
Personnel per liner notes.

- Tracy Bonham - bass, guitar, violin, Hammond organ, vocals
- Gregg Arreguin - guitar
- Steve Berlin - baritone saxophone
- Mitchell Froom - organ, piano, drum loop, sounds, optigan, Minimoog
- Don Gilmore - bass, production
- Dan Rothchild - bass
- Andrew Sherman - clavinet, Wurlitzer
- Steve Slingeneyer - percussion, drums, marimba
- Sebastian Steinberg - bass, upright bass
- Pete Thomas - drums
- Josh Freese - drums

== Production ==
- Producers: Tracy Bonham, Tchad Blake, Mitchell Froom, Mark Endert, Don Gilmore
- Engineer: Tchad Blake
- Assistants: Doug Boehm, David Bryant, Robert Carranza, Juan Garcia, Evan Hollander, S. "Husky" Hoskulds, James Murray
- Mixing: Tchad Blake, Mark Endert, Tom Lord
- String arrangements: Tracy Bonham
- Pitch adjustment: Tracy Bonham
- Design: Ondine Bue, Steve Slingeneyer
- Art direction: Ondine Bue, Steve Slingeneyer
- Photography: Valerie Phillips, Norman Jean Roy
