= Audio (album) =

Studio album by Blue Man Group
- Released: December 7, 1999
- Recorded: 1999
- Genre: Experimental rock
- Length: 57:29
- Label: Virgin
- Producer: Todd Perlmutter

Blue Man Group chronology
Audio (1999)	The Complex (2003)

Audio is the debut studio album by Blue Man Group, released on December 7, 1999, through Virgin Records. It was nominated for the Grammy Award for Best Pop Instrumental Album.

This album was released in two versions: a DVD with 5.1-channel versions of the music in both DVD-Video (using Dolby Digital) and DVD-Audio formats (one on each side) and a CD with a 2-channel stereo mix of each track.

A behind-the-scenes video of the album is viewable on a promotional 2000 VHS known as Audio Video. This is also included as a bonus on the Audio 5.1 Surround Sound DVD.

== Reception ==
Professional ratings
Review scores
Source	Rating
AllMusic	3/5 stars

Heather Phares of AllMusic rated Audio three out of five stars, stating that it "reflects over a decade's worth of musical and theatrical innovation". Although she mentioned that "the spectacle of the group playing its sculptural, surreal-looking instruments is absent from the album", she concluded her review by calling it "an album that proves the Blue Man Group is as innovative in the studio as it is onstage".

== Track listing ==
No.	Title	Length
1.	"TV Song"	2:08
2.	"Opening Mandelbrot"	3:13
3.	"Synaesthetic"	5:31
4.	"Utne Wire Man"	3:18
5.	"Rods and Cones"	5:57
6.	"Tension 2"	2:05
7.	"Mandelgroove"	5:49
8.	"PVC IV"	4:23
9.	"Club Nowhere"	4:50
10.	"Drumbone"	2:44
11.	"Shadows"	2:06
12.	"Cat Video"	2:20
13.	"Klein Mandelbrot"	8:03
14.	"Endless Column"	5:02

== Personnel ==
- Producer – Todd Perlmutter
- Engineer – Andrew Schneider
- Mastered by – Bob Ludwig
- Mixed by – Mike Fraser

=== Blue Man Group ===
- Phil Stanton – performer: air poles, extension cord bull roarer, ribbon crasher; percussion: drumbone, tubulum, mid-octave PVC, backpack tubulum, dumpster; drums: utne, drum wall, Phil drum; cimbalom, timpani
- Matt Goldman – performer: air poles, ribbon crasher; percussion: low-octave PVC, drumbone, backpack PVC, dumpster; cimbalom, bass (upside down; gong (shaker); drums: utne
- Chris Wink – performer: air poles; percussion:doppler toms, tubulum, drumbone, high-octave PVC, dumpster, backpack tubulum, piano smasher; cimbalom, shaker (utne); drums: drum wall, cuíca
- Larry Heinemann – Chapman Stick, bass guitar, guitar (baritone), cuíca
- Ian Pai – drums: drum wall, Phil drum; percussion: aronophonic, quellum grill
- Christian Dyas – zither, bass guitar, guitar (12-string); electronics:electric dog toy
- Todd Perlmutter – percussion, drums:drum kit, left-side double drum kit, drum wall, toy drum, Phil drum

=== Additional musicians ===
- Jamie Edwards – performer: air poles (tracks: 1, 4, 14)
- Chris Bowen – drums: drum wall (track: 7)
- Clem Waldman – drums: drum wall (track: 5)
- Cräg Rodriguez – drums: drum wall (track: 7); percussion: dumpster (track: 12)
- Jeff Quay – drums: right-side double drum kit (tracks: 2, 4, 7, 8, 12 to 14) & drum wall (tracks: 5 & 13)
- Byron Estep – guitar (tracks: 5, 7 & 9)
- John Kimbrough – guitar (track: 7)
- Bradford Reed – zither (tracks: 2, 4, 8, 13, 14)
- David Corter – zither (tracks: 8, 9, 12, 13)
- Elvis Lederer – zither (track: 1) & Pressaphonic zither (track: 5)
- Jens Fischer – zither (tracks: 2, 4, 6, 11, 13, 14)

== Certifications ==
Region	Certification	Certified units/sales
United States (RIAA)	Gold	500,000^{^}
^{^} Shipments figures based on certification alone.
