= Blue Man Group =

American performance art company

- Logo of Blue Man Group

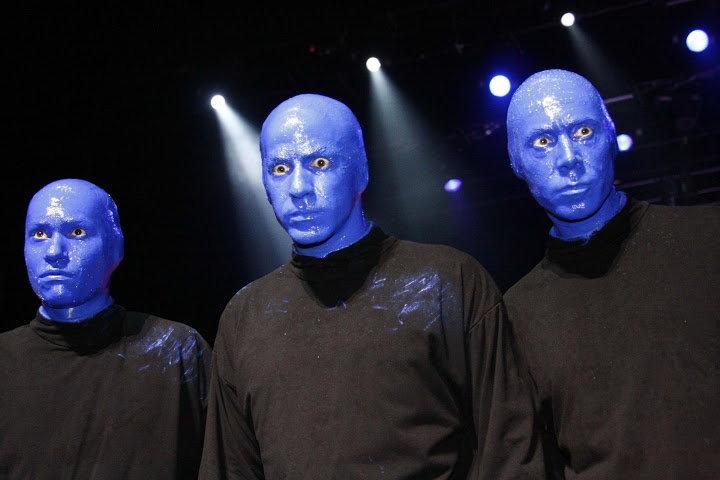
- Blue Man Group in 2009
- Formation: 1987; 39 years ago
- Type: Theatre group
- Purpose: Performance art; music
- Locations: Berlin; Las Vegas; Orlando; Shanghai
- Website: blueman.com

Blue Man Group is an American performance art company founded in New York City in 1987. It is known for its stage productions that incorporate many kinds of music and art, both popular and obscure. Its performers, known as Blue Men, have their skin painted blue. They are mute during shows and always appear in groups of three.

As of 2025, the company's only permanent locations are in Las Vegas and Orlando.

A typical production employs seven to nine full-time Blue Men who are selected by audition. In addition to their stage shows, Blue Man Group has toured nationally and internationally, appeared on television programs as characters and performers, released multiple studio albums, contributed to a number of film scores, and performed with orchestras around the United States.

== History ==
=== New York ===
Blue Man Group grew out of a collaboration of three close friends, Chris Wink, Matt Goldman and Phil Stanton, on Manhattan's Lower East Side in 1987. Its first public appearance was a celebration at the end of the 1980s. The three wore blue masks and led a street procession that included the burning of a Rambo doll and a piece of the Berlin Wall. MTV's Kurt Loder covered the event, drawing attention to the group. What began as creative "disturbances" on the city's streets became a series of small shows at downtown clubs, and eventually a full performance at the Astor Place Theatre in 1991.

In 1993, the group trained their first understudy. To be in the group, a Blue Man had to "be between five-foot-ten and six-foot-one, skilled at drumming, and able to 'wordlessly emote' ... [They] learn to embody six archetypes, which the group calls the 'innocent, hero, scientist, shaman, group member, and trickster.'" The early Blue Man cast included Gideon Banner, Chris Bowen, Michael Dahlen, Isaac Eddy, Josh Elrod, Mark Frankel, Matt Goldman, John Grady, Randall Jaynes, Pete Simpson and Piet Starrett. Andrea Johnson was the first woman to be a Blue Man. She worked with them from 1999 to 2001.

In 2006, the group established a playgroup for their children that would eventually become the now defunct Blue School.

In 2010, Goldman sold his share in the group to a venture-capital firm and the group hired Willy Burkhardt, who was president of the company from 2010 through 2013. In 2017, Wink and Stanton sold their shares to the Canadian company Cirque du Soleil. On June 29, 2020, Cirque du Soleil filed for bankruptcy in Canada and temporarily laid off staff the following day. On July 1, 2020, Cirque du Soleil also filed for bankruptcy under Chapter 15, Title 11, United States Code.

The New York City run at Astor Place ended on February 2, 2025, after three decades and more than 17,000 performances.

=== Other locations ===
On February 1, 2021, the group closed their run at Universal Orlando Resort, citing the COVID-19 pandemic as part of the decision. In June 2024, it was announced that the group would be returning to Orlando in a new location. The group was set to open at the ICON Park in April 2025, though this was later delayed until May 2026.

== Themes ==
Blue Man performances have a number of themes, including:

- Science and technology, especially the topics of plumbing, fractals, human sight, DNA, and the Internet.
- Information overload and information pollution, such as when the audience is asked to choose one of three simultaneous streams of information to read.
- Innocence, as when the Blue Men appear to be surprised and perplexed by common artifacts of modern society or by audience reactions.
- Self-conscious and naïve imitation of cultural norms, such as attempting to stage an elegant dinner of Twinkies for an audience member; or following the Rock Concert Instruction Manual with the expectation that following instructions is all it takes to put on a rock concert.
- Rooftops, or climbing to the top, a metaphor for the directive that Stanton, Wink and Goldman drew from Joseph Campbell and Bill Moyers's PBS program Joseph Campbell and the Power of Myth, namely, "following your bliss".

== Theatrical productions ==
=== Current productions ===
United States

- Las Vegas at the Luxor Las Vegas Hotel and Casino (2015–present)
- Orlando at the Icon Park (2026–present)

China

- Shanghai (2024–present)

=== Previous productions ===
Australia

- Sydney at the Sydney Lyric Theatre (2013)

Austria

- Vienna at MuseumsQuartier (2010)

Canada

- Toronto at the Panasonic Theatre (2005–2007)

Germany

- Berlin at the Theater am Potsdamer Platz (2004–2006)
- Berlin at the Bluemax Theater (2006–2025)
- Oberhausen at the Metronom Theater (2007–2008)
- Stuttgart at the Apollo Theater (2008)

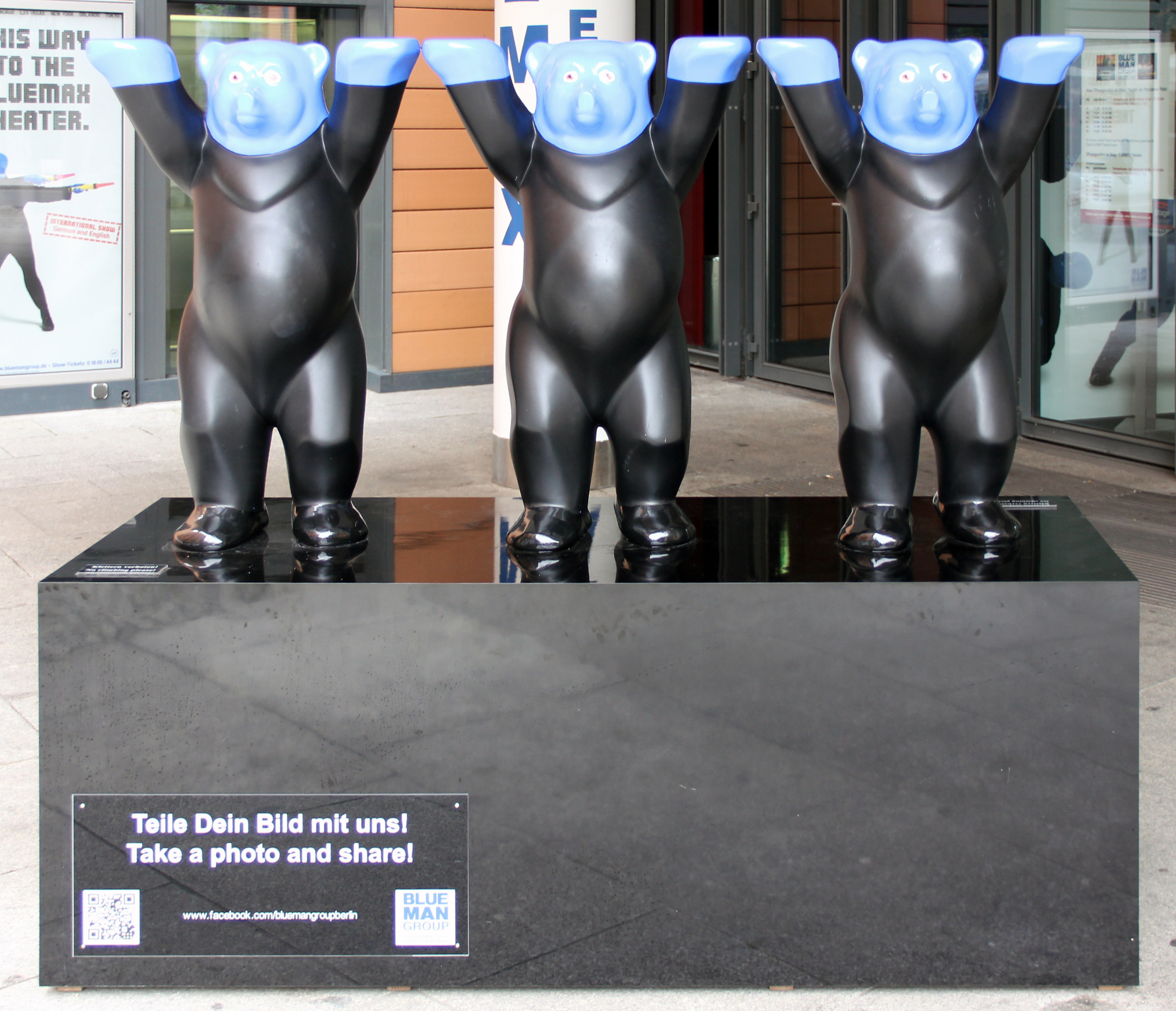
Blue Man Group-Buddy Bears, in Berlin-Mitte

Japan

- Tokyo at the Roppongi Invoice Theatre (2007–2009)
- Tokyo at the Roppongi Blue Man Theatre (2010–2012)

Netherlands

- Amsterdam at the Theater Fabriek (2006–2007)

Norwegian Cruise Line

- Norwegian Epic (2010–2015)

Sweden

- Stockholm at Göta Lejon (2010)

Switzerland

- Basel at Musical Theater Basel (2008)
- Zürich at Theater 11 (2010)

United Kingdom

- London at the New London Theatre (2005–2007)

United States

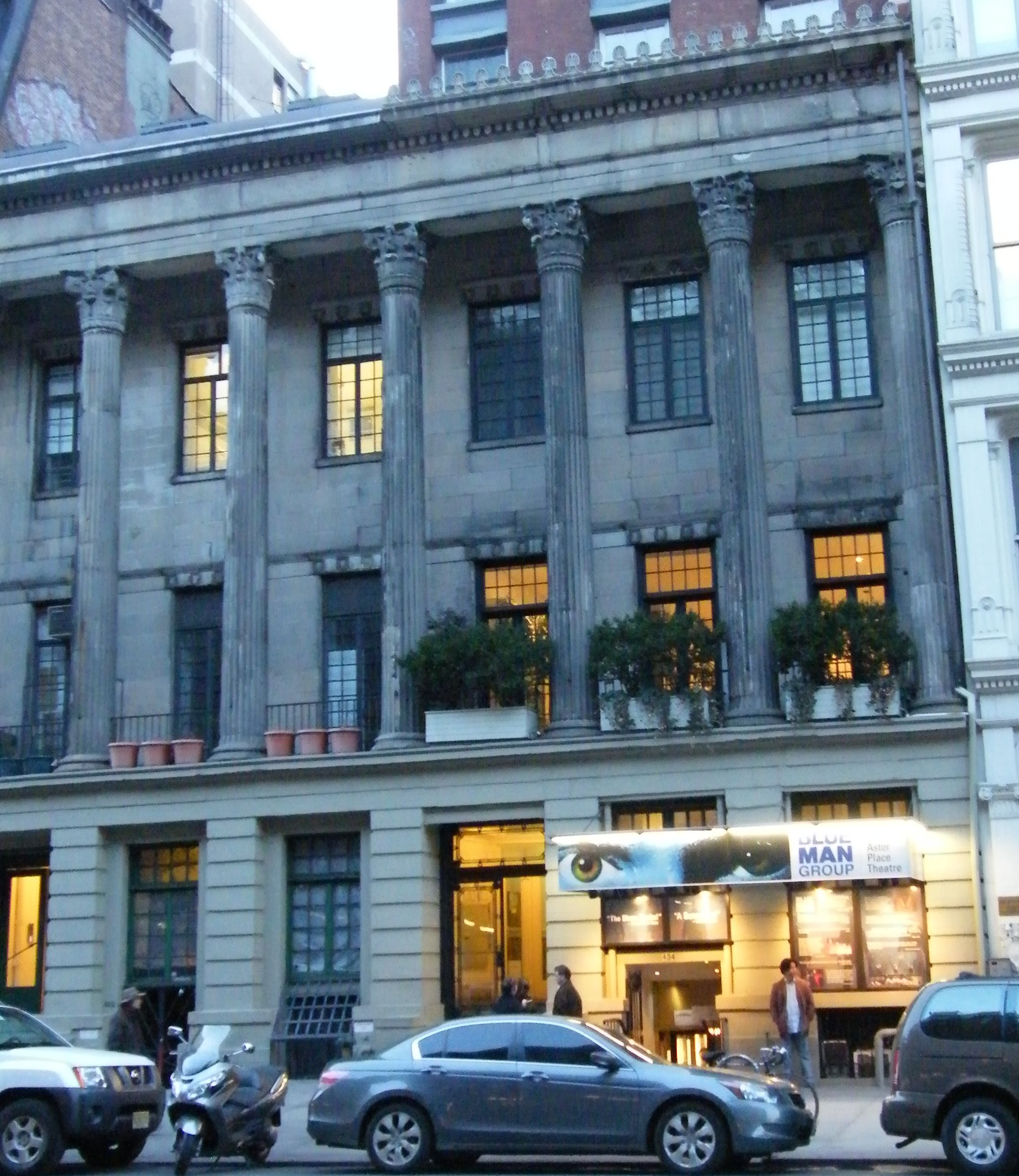
Astor Place Theatre with marquee for the group.

- New York City at the Astor Place Theatre (1991–2025)
- Boston at the Charles Playhouse (1995–2025)
- Chicago at the Briar Street Theatre (1997–2025)
- Las Vegas
  - Luxor Theater (2000–2005)
  - The Venetian Las Vegas (2005–2012)
  - Monte Carlo Resort and Casino (2012–2015)
- Blue Man Group at Universal Orlando Resort's CityWalk (2007–2021)
- "How to be a Megastar" national arena "rock concert" tour (2003)
- "How to be a Megastar 2.0" (2006)
- North America tour (2010–2016)
- Speechless Tour (2019–2020)
- Philadelphia at Miller Theater Feb 24 – Mar 1, 2026

== Music and tours ==
In 1999, the group released Audio, their first studio recording.

They performed Moby's song "Natural Blues" with Moby and Jill Scott at the Grammys in 2001.

In 2002, the group participated in Moby's Area2 tour, giving a more rock-oriented performance than in the theatrical shows. Songs developed during this tour appeared on 2003's album The Complex.

Unlike Audio, The Complex, released in 2003, featured a variety of vocalists and guests including Tracy Bonham, Dave Matthews, Gavin Rossdale and Venus Hum. The record spawned its own 2003 tour, "The Complex Rock Tour," the first headlined by Blue Man Group. The tour deconstructed the traditional rock concert experience into its often clichéd parts and was chronicled in a 2004 DVD release. The tour featured Tracy Bonham and Venus Hum as supporting acts. The DVD included a surround sound mix of some of the studio recordings.

Blue Man Group launched its second tour, "How to Be a Megastar Tour", on September 26, 2006. It featured some new material as well as material from the original Complex Rock Tour, and featured Tracy Bonham as opening act and vocalist. DJ/VJ Mike Relm was the opening act for the tour's second leg, which ended April 22, 2007, in Wilkes-Barre, Pennsylvania. The third leg of the tour began in May 2007 and included performances in Mexico City, Guadalajara, and Monterrey, Mexico; Buenos Aires, Argentina; São Paulo and Rio de Janeiro, Brazil; and Santiago, Chile. The fourth leg, using "2.1" in its title, included more U.S. and Canada dates. The tour visited France, Korea, Canada, Germany, and a few other European countries through 2008. From August 19–23, it visited Taipei, Taiwan to promote its 2009 Summer Deaflympics, with most of the show's dialogue accompanied by subtitles. After Typhoon Morakot hit the island in mid-August 2009, the group held an extra show to benefit flood victims.

Blue Man Group performed with Ricky Martin at the 8th Annual Latin Grammy Awards in 2007 and again with Michel Teló at the 2012 Latin Grammy Awards.

In 2008, they collaborated on the track "No More Heroes" with Dutch DJ and producer Tiësto for the remixed version of the Elements of Life album.

Announced in 2009, Blue Man Group began performing for the first time at sea on Norwegian Cruise Line's ship Epic. From July 2010 to March 2015, Epic alternated 7-Day Eastern and Western Caribbean sailings from Miami with nightly Blue Man Group shows.

A Blue Man Group national tour in 2010 visited various cities in the United States, Canada and Latin America. The tour included elements from their then-current theatrical performances, and new elements created for the tour.

To celebrate their 20th anniversary, the group gave a special performance with Dave Matthews at the Astor Place Theatre in New York City, collaborating on the song "Sing Along."

To celebrate Blue Man Group's 25th anniversary, a global tour began in Singapore in March 2016. It continued through Asia and Oceania in 2016 and opened for the first time in South Africa in February 2017. It was announced that the tour will continue on to Abu Dhabi and Switzerland later in 2017.

In April 2016, Blue Man Group released Three, their third studio album. Building on the group's previous albums, Three draws inspiration from the group's 25-year history.

In May 2017, Blue Man Group collaborated with the YouTube channel The Slow Mo Guys for a video of several objects being destroyed with bowling balls, including busts of the Blue Men. A Blue Man "autographed" Gavin Free's lab coat (the cleaner of the hosts') by wiping his head on the right shoulder.

On April 27, 2019, Blue Man Group gave a special performance at the Orange County Convention Center in Orlando, Florida, during the Grand Opening Session of DECA's International Career Development Conference.

In February 2021, it was revealed that Blue Man Group had collaborated with American pop band AJR on the song "Ordinaryish People", included on their album OK Orchestra (2021). A music video featuring Blue Man Group was released on February 9, 2022.

In April 2024, Blue Man collaborated with Canadian musician Andrew Huang on a song called "Desert Portal". They released joint videos on their YouTube channels: the former's of the song's music video, which depicts the group and Huang discovering a sound-activated tent that transports them to a desert, and the latter's of the music video's behind the scenes.

On August 16, 2024, Blue Man Group collaborated with the YouTube channel Drumeo for a video, alongside their musical director, Josh Matthews. They are introduced to a song by My Chemical Romance called "Welcome to the Black Parade". They listen to the song in its entirety without a drum track, and then are tasked with creating their own drum part and performing it on video. After their performance, the song is then revealed in its original form with the drum track included and the group's reaction is recorded.

== Discography ==
- Audio (1999) — Blue Man Group's first album is certified gold (500,000 units) by the RIAA and was nominated for the Grammy Award for Best Pop Instrumental Album.
- The Complex (2003) — Blue Man Group's second full-length studio album features collaborations with various musicians including Dave Matthews, Gavin Rossdale, and more. This album charted four songs on the Billboard charts.
- Live at The Venetian — Las Vegas iTunes exclusive (2006)
- THREE (2016) — Their third studio album, released in April 2016 as a completely instrumental album (like Audio), the single Giacometti was released on blue vinyl originally. New instruments such as the "Snorkelbone", "Chimeulum", "Pipeulum", and "Tone Spokes" are introduced on this album.

== Videography ==
- The Complex Rock Tour Live DVD (2003) — live concert footage taken from shows in Grand Prairie, Texas
- Scoring Reel — a scoring DVD only available in 2004
- Robots (2005) — performed on soundtrack for movie
- Inside the Tube (2006) — one-hour documentary created for PBS. Features interviews with Stanton, Wink, and Goldman describing the Blue Men, and video clips from various theatrical performances. In "Inside the Tube," press notes state, "the three founders discuss the improbable journey they took from building drums and tube instruments in their living room to having one of the most popular shows in Las Vegas, a gold album, and a successful arena-sized rock tour. The program takes an intimate look inside Blue Man Group's unique creative process and provides never before revealed insight into some of the underlying themes of their work. The founders also cite some of their influences, including a public PBS program that impacted them at a pivotal moment in their career.""Blue Man Group: Inside the Tube" Airs on PBS Dec. 6 | Playbill Available through the PBS store and also as an extra on the How To Be A Megastar Live! DVD.
- How to Be a Megastar Live! (2008) — live concert footage from Blue Man Group's newest tour. It was released on DVD on April 1 and Blu-ray on November 4, 2008. The DVD version includes an additional audio CD of many of the show's songs.
- Space Chimps (2008) — performed several songs on the soundtrack for the movie

== Books ==
- In 2016, Blue Man Group released their first book, Blue Man World published by Black Dog & Leventhal Publishers.

== Television ==
=== Advertising ===
- Intel — Blue Man Group appeared in advertisements for the Pentium III, Pentium 4, and Centrino line of processors.
- TIM Brasil — Blue Man Group was the face of the Brazilian arm of telecommunications company TIM.

=== Programming ===
- The Tonight Show with Jay Leno (1992–94, 1997–2001, 2003–2005, 2007) Blue Man Group appeared on the premiere of Leno's version of The Tonight Show, prompting him to state, "This is not your father's Tonight Show." They appeared on the show 17 times, often involving audience members and celebrity guests, including Robin Williams and Mel Gibson. One Blue Man Group episode won an Emmy Award for The Tonight Show.
- The Drew Carey Show (2001) — During the episode "Drew Live III," the Blue Man Group experimented on Drew Carey as he slept on the train, making it look like he had sex with his nemesis, Mimi Bobeck. At the end of the show, it was revealed that their motive was for Drew to kill himself out of embarrassment so that they, along with John Ratzenberger, could take over the show.
- Arrested Development (2004) — The show approached Blue Man Group about appearing in an episode. The collaboration grew to a storyline where Tobias longed to be a part of Blue Man Group, and, ultimately, his father-in-law "hid from the law" performing as a Blue Man in Las Vegas.
- Fetch! with Ruff Ruffman (2007)
- Scrubs (2006)
- Space Pirates (2007)
- Disney Channel's Shake It Up (2012) — Blue Man Group guest stars.
- NBC's America's Got Talent (2012) — For the season finale, BMG performed "Shake Your Euphemism".
- NBC's Today Show (2015) — Blue Man Group performed on a live broadcast from Universal CityWalk. At the end of the performance, Al Roker helped the Blue Men fire confetti from the stage.
- NBC's I Can Do That (June 2015) — Alan Ritchson and Joe Jonas trained to become Blue Men.
- NBC's The Tonight Show Starring Jimmy Fallon (October 2015) — During the "Telephone Booth" skit, a Blue Man was a celebrity from the "mystery bench" and was placed in the telephone booth with Hugh Jackman after his opponent, Shaq, answered a question correctly. The trapped Blue Man wrote "help" with blue paint from his head on the telephone booth wall. In another "Telephone Booth" skit, two members of the group joined Jimmy Fallon in his booth after Dwayne Johnson, aided by Romanio Golphin Jr, answered a question correctly. Only two members of the group entered the booth, while the other wandered around the stage, due to the booth also being occupied by WWE wrestler Big Show.
- Telemundo's La Voz Kids (July 2016) — During the live finale, Blue Man Group performed alongside the show's top 6 finalists. The kids sang "Applause" by Lady Gaga and three Blue Men and Blue Man Group band members provided the music.
- NPR's Tiny Desk Concert (September 2016) — Blue Man Group performed tracks from their studio album Three during a Tiny Desk Takeover
- NBC's Best Time Ever with Neil Patrick Harris (October 2016) — The Blue Men played instruments alongside Neil Patrick Harris, who got in on the drumming. By the end of the performance, Harris and episode co-host Shaquille O'Neal were doused in blue paint.
- AMC's Halt and Catch Fire (August 2017) — In this drama about the first decade of personal computing, Blue Man Group performs at engineer and businessman Gordon Clark's 40th birthday party.
- Tru Tv's Impractical Jokers Season 8 episode 5 punishment in the episode "Blue Man Dupe". At a Blue Man Group Concert, Q is forced to rudely ask strangers to get out of their seat; because he thinks that the seat is his, where he later finds an error on his ticket. Later, Q must sit in the front row when the show starts in just his clothes, unlike in a poncho—like everyone else, and get disgusting substances all over him, and made a mess of with things like toilet paper.
- CNBC's Deal or No Deal had them support Max Reynolds during his gameplay.

Blue Man Group has also performed on various shows such as an appearance on the Grammy Awards (with Jill Scott and Moby), the Emmy Awards, The Latin Grammy Awards, The Royal Variety Show (for Queen Elizabeth II), Wetten, dass..? (Germany), The Voice (Germany), Regis and Kathie Lee, Regis and Kelly and The Ellen DeGeneres Show.

== Awards and nominations ==
- 1991 Obie Award (winner)
- 1992 Drama Desk Award for Unique Theatrical Experience (winner)
- 1992 Lucille Lortel Special Award
- 2000 Grammy Award for Best Pop Instrumental Album (nominee)
- 2000 Eddy Award (design)
- 2010 OBIE Advertising Award
- 2011 Off Broadway Alliance Awards' Audience Choice Award for Best Long-Running Show (winner)
- 2012 International Emmy Award nomination for Arts Programming (nominee)
- 2014 Drum! Magazine Readers Choice Award — Best Percussion Ensemble (winner)
- 2015 Drum! Magazine Readers Choice Award — Best Percussion Ensemble (winner)
- 2021 'Blue Man Group X Friends Anniversary' The Telly Awards — Silver Winner: Craft Branded Content

== See also ==
- Gear
- Penn Jillette, a Blue Man affiliate and Las Vegas stage magician
- Nanta
- Stomp
- Überschall, a Las Vegas band consisting of past and present members of Blue Man Group
