= Live at Dead Lake =

Studio album by Hot Club de Paris
- Released: June 16, 2008
- Recorded: October 2007–March 2008
- Studios: Engine Studios, Chicago; St Bride's Church, Liverpool
- Genres: Indie rock, math rock
- Label: Moshi Moshi
- Producer: Brian Deck

Hot Club de Paris chronology
Drop It 'til It Pops (2006)	Live at Dead Lake (2008)	With Days Like This as Cheap as Chewing Gum, Why Would Anyone Want to Work? (2010)

Professional ratings
Review scores
Source	Rating
Drowned in Sound	7/10 stars
The Fly	3.5/5 stars
Glamour Magazine	4/5 stars
MusicOMH	4/5 stars
The Scotsman	4/5 stars
This Is Fake DIY	7/10 stars
Uncut	4/5 stars

Live at Dead Lake is the second album from English indie band Hot Club De Paris, which was released in mid-2008. The first single released from the album is entitled "Hey Housebrick" and was released on 16 June on Moshi Moshi records. There was a limited edition bonus disc included with the album.

== Track listing ==
=== Disc 1 ===
- All Songs but Tracks 10 and 11 Written by Hot Club De Paris, unless where noted.
1. Call Me Mr. Demolition Ball
2. My Little Haunting
3. I Wasn't Being Heartless When I Said Your Favourite Song Lacked Heart
4. For Parties Past and Present
5. Let Go Of Everything
6. Friendship Song
7. Hey Housebrick
8. We Played Ourselves, Ain't Nobody Else's Fault
9. Boy Awaits Return Of The Runaway Girl
10. The Dice Just Wasn't Loaded From The Start (Davison, Rafferty)
11. The Anchor (Hurley, Watt)
12. This Thing Forever
13. Found Sleeping
14. Sparrow Flew With Swallows Wings

=== Bonus Disc ===
1. Hey! Housebrick (Acoustic Version)
2. My Little Haunting (Acoustic Version)
3. Boy Awaits Return Of The Runaway Girl (Acoustic Version)
4. For Parties Past And Present (Acoustic Version)
5. Straight To Hell (Acoustic Version) (The Clash cover)

== Personnel ==
Hot Club de Paris

- Paul Rafferty - Bass guitar, Baritone Guitar, Acoustic Guitar, Lead Vocals
- Matthew Smith - Lead Guitar, Backing Vocals
- Alasdair Smith - Drums, Percussion, Piano, Melodica, Backing Vocals

Additional personnel

- Additional Vocals on 'Hey! Housebrick' by Lucy Johnson and Nicola Fitzsimmons
- Bonus CD Tracks produced by Neil Strauch
- Photography by Nick Brown, Rory Buckingham and Ali Moretti
- Sleeve Art by Paul Rafferty
