= Topp Stemning På Lokal Bar =

Studio album by Casiokids
- Released: June 8, 2010
- Genre: Synthpop

Casiokids chronology
Fuck MIDI (2007)	Topp Stemning På Lokal Bar (2010)	Aabenbaringen over aaskammen (2011)

Topp Stemning På Lokal Bar is an album by the Norwegian synthpop band Casiokids, released in the US on June 8, 2010, in physical and digital formats. The deluxe version includes bonus remixed material, on a second CD in the physical version. The song "Fot i Hose" in this album is part of the soundtrack of the EA Sports videogame, FIFA 10.

== Track listing ==
All songs composed by Casiokids unless noted.
No.	Title	Length
1.	"Grønt Lys I Alle Ledd"	5:01
2.	"Fot I Hose"	2:59
3.	"Verdens Største Land"	6:42
4.	"Finn Bikkjen!"	5:15
5.	"Min Siste Dag"	5:11
6.	"En Vill Hest"	5:34
7.	"Gomurmamma"	4:14
8.	"Togens Hule"	3:49
Total length:		38:45

Deluxe version
No.	Title	Writer(s)	Length
9.	"Verdens Største Land (Velferd Remix)"		7:25
10.	"Fot I Hose (Captain Credible Remix)"		2:58
11.	"Det Snurrer (Casiokids Remake)"		4:18
12.	"Verdens Største Land (Captain Credible's Orchestral Stab Remix)"		4:51
13.	"Fot I Hose (Axemax & Big P Remix)"		3:14
14.	"Hun er Min Venstre Hånd (Casiokids Translation)"	James Yuill	3:00
15.	"Fot I Hose (Lo-Fi-FNK Extension)"		6:52
16.	"Verdens Største Land (Axemax & Big P Remix)"		5:04
Total length:			1:06:07
