= Paradise (Slow Club album) =

Studio album by Slow Club
- Released: 12 September 2011
- Genres: Folk, indie pop
- Length: 44:58
- Label: Moshi Moshi
- Producer: Luke Smith

Slow Club chronology
Christmas, Thanks for Nothing (2009)	Paradise (2011)	Complete Surrender (2014)

Singles from Paradise
- 1. "Two Cousins" Released: 9 May 2011; 2. "Where I'm Waking" Released: 24 August 2011

Paradise is the second studio album by English folk pop duo Slow Club. It was released on 12 September 2011, on independent record label Moshi Moshi Records. The record was produced by Luke Smith, former member of Clor and producer of Foals' Mercury-nominated Total Life Forever. The album received "universal acclaim" according to review aggregator Metacritic, and peaked at number 70 on the United Kingdom Albums Chart. The songs "Two Cousins" and "Where I'm Waking" were released as singles leading up to the album's release. The next single to be released was "Beginners", whose video features Harry Potter film star Daniel Radcliffe. The video for "Beginners" was filmed in the Faltering Fullback, a pub in Finsbury Park in London, and was shot in a single take.

== Track listing ==
Paradise
No.	Title	Length
1.	"Two Cousins"	3:50
2.	"If We're Still Alive"	3:17
3.	"Never Look Back"	4:30
4.	"Where I'm Waking"	3:43
5.	"Hackney Marsh"	3:52
6.	"Beginners"	4:16
7.	"You, Earth or Ash"	4:28
8.	"Gold Mountain"	3:24
9.	"The Dog"	2:43
10.	"Horses Jumping"	10:59
Total length:		44:58

- The track "Horses Jumping" has a hidden track on the end called "Paradise".

Paradise – Deluxe edition (bonus tracks)
No.	Title	Length
10.	"Horses Jumping"	6:29
11.	"Paradise"	4:25
12.	"Half Drunk"	4:01
13.	"Palms"	3:00
14.	"Two Cousins (Acoustic Version)"	2:43
15.	"Never Look Back (Acoustic Version)"	3:23
16.	"Two Cousins (Malcolm Middleton & Aidan Moffatt 1999 Version)"	4:12
17.	"Two Cousins (Music video)"	3:01
18.	"Paradise (Live video)"	3:15
19.	"Wild Blue Milk (Live video)"	3:32
20.	"US Tour (video)"	1:07
21.	"European Tour (video)"	2:40
Total length:		75:53

== Critical reception ==
Professional ratings
Aggregate scores
Source	Rating
Metacritic	81/100
Review scores
Source	Rating
AllMusic	4/5 stars
Drowned in Sound	8/10
MusicOMH	3.5/5 stars
NME	7/10
Paste	7.6/10
Pitchfork	7.8/10
Q	4/5 stars
Rolling Stone	3.5/5 stars
Uncut	4/5 stars
Under the Radar	8/10

The album has received widespread critical acclaim from critics. On Metacritic, a website which assigns a normalised rating out of 100 from reviews by mainstream critics, it currently holds a rating of 81/100, signifying Universal Acclaim.
