= Yeah So =

Studio album by Slow Club
- Released: 6 July 2009
- Recorded: 2008–2009
- Genres: Indie pop, folk, twee pop, folk rock
- Length: 45:32
- Label: Moshi Moshi

Slow Club chronology
Let's Fall Back in Love (2008)	Yeah So (2009)	Christmas, Thanks for Nothing (2009)

Singles from Yeah So
- 1. "It Doesn't Have to Be Beautiful" Released: 22 June 2009; 2. "Trophy Room" Released: 12 October 2009

Professional ratings
Review scores
Source	Rating
Drowned in Sound	7/10 stars
The Fly	4/5 stars
NME	8/10 stars
Pitchfork	(7.4/10)

Yeah So is the debut album by British folk-duo Slow Club, released on 6 July 2009.

On 19 April 2010 a vinyl edition of Yeah So was released by Moshi Moshi Records to celebrate Record Store Day

== Track listing ==
No.	Title	Length
1.	"When I Go"	3:06
2.	"Giving Up on Love"	2:51
3.	"I Was Unconscious, It Was a Dream"	3:37
4.	"It Doesn't Have to Be Beautiful"	3:45
5.	"There Is No Good Way to Say I'm Leaving You"	3:06
6.	"Trophy Room"	3:38
7.	"Because We're Dead"	2:57
8.	"Dance Till the Morning Light"	3:19
9.	"Sorry About the Doom"	2:18
10.	"Come on Youth"	3:10
11.	"Apples and Pairs"	3:48
12.	"Our Most Brilliant Friends/Boys on Their Birthdays (Bonus Hidden Track)"	10:06

iTunes Bonus Tracks
No.	Title	Length
13.	"Christmas TV"	4:30
14.	"Let's Fall Back in Love"	3:17
15.	"Thinking, Drinking, Sinking, Feeling"	3:36

Special Edition Bonus Disc
No.	Title	Length
1.	"Let's Fall Back in Love"	3:16
2.	"Me and You"	3:02
3.	"Wild Blue Milk"	3:20
4.	"Christmas TV"	4:33
5.	"Because We're Dead (Live at Union Chapel)"	2:58
6.	"I Was Unconscious, It Was a Dream (Live at Union Chapel)"	3:34
7.	"There Is No Good Way to Say I'm Leaving You (Live at Union Chapel)"	3:21
8.	"Trophy Room (Live at Union Chapel)"	3:38
9.	"Sorry About the Doom (Live at Union Chapel)"	2:28
