= New Adventures =

New Adventures may refer to:

- New Adventures (dance company), a British dance company
- New Adventures (Dutch band), a Dutch rock and roll band from the 1980s
- New Adventures (British band), a British band from the 2000s
- Virgin New Adventures, a series of novels from Virgin Publishing based on the television series Doctor Who

== See also ==
- New Adventures of Queen Victoria, a web comic
- New Adventures of a Yankee in King Arthur's Court, a 1988 Soviet film
- New Adventures of Get Rich Quick Wallingford, a 1931 US film
- New Adventures of Lucky Luke, a book in the Lucky Luke series
- New Adventures in Hi-Fi, an album by US rock band REM
- New Adventure Island, a game
- The New Adventures of Winnie the Pooh, an animated TV series
- Dragonlance: The New Adventures, a young adult subseries in the Dragonlance fantasy universe
