= Drop It 'til It Pops =

Studio album by Hot Club de Paris
- Released: 9 October 2006
- Recorded: 2006
- Genres: Indie rock, math rock
- Length: 31:24
- Label: Moshi Moshi Records
- Producers: Tim Speed; Adam Whittaker

Hot Club de Paris chronology
Drop It 'til It Pops (2006)	Live at Dead Lake (2008)

Professional ratings
Review scores
Source	Rating
Drowned in Sound	7/10
Gigwise	4/5 stars
NME	7/10
OMM	4/5 stars
This Is Fake DIY	4/5 stars
The Times	3/5 stars

Drop It 'til It Pops is the debut album by Hot Club de Paris. It was released on Moshi Moshi Records on October 9, 2006. The pre-track, "Welcome to the Hot Club de Paris", is only accessible by rewinding the CD in a compatible player on track one.

== Track listing ==
All lyrics are written by Hot Club De Paris; all music is composed by Hot Club De Paris.

Drop it Til it Pops
No.	Title	Length
0.	"Welcome to the Hot Club de Paris"	1:17
1.	"Shipwreck"	2:36
2.	"Clockwork Toys"	3:13
3.	"3:55am, I Think We Should Go Home"	2:54
4.	"Yes/No/Goodbye!"	1:08
5.	"Names and Names and Names"	2:18
6.	"sometimesitsbetternottostickbitsofeachotherineachotherforeachother"	2:48
7.	"Snitches Get Stitches"	2:40
8.	"Who Am I? (Whats my Name?)"	2:12
9.	"Welcome To The Hop"	1:16
10.	"Bonded By Blood (A Song For Two Brothers)"	1:42
11.	"Hello I Wrote A Song For You Called 'Welcome To The Jungle'"	3:52
12.	"Your Face Looks All Wrong"	2:15
13.	"Everyeveryeverything"	2:32
Total length:		31:24

Bonus Disc [Included with Limited 2CD Edition]
No.	Title	Length
14.	"Hello Comrade (I Quit My Job)"	2:28
15.	"Balance And Symmetry"	1:51
16.	"I Swung For Judas"	2:06
17.	"Six Months Of Slump Life"	1:31
18.	"Snitches Get Stitches [Acoustic]"	2:44

== Personnel ==
Hot Club de Paris

- Paul Rafferty - Bass guitar, Baritone Guitar, Lead Vocals
- Matthew Smith - Guitar, Backing Vocals
- Alasdair Smith - Drums, Piano, Glockenspiel, Organ, Percussion, Backing Vocals

Production

- Tracks 0, 3, 4, 7, 12 produced and mixed by Adam Whittaker
- Tracks 1, 5, 6, 8–11, 13 produced by Tim Speed, mixed by Adam Whittaker
