= Christmas, Thanks for Nothing =

EP by Slow Club
- Released: 14 December 2009
- Recorded: 2009
- Genre: Indie pop, folk
- Length: 19:48
- Label: Moshi Moshi

Slow Club chronology
Yeah So (2009)	Christmas, Thanks for Nothing (2009)	Paradise (2011)

Professional ratings
Review scores
Source	Rating
Drowned in Sound	8/10 stars

Christmas, Thanks for Nothing is a Christmas EP by British folk-duo Slow Club, released on 14 December 2009.

== Track listing ==
No.	Title	Length
1.	"All Alone at Christmas"	4:24
2.	"Christmas (Baby Please Come Home)"	2:49
3.	"It's Christmas and You're Boring Me"	2:51
4.	"Christmas Thanks for Nothing"	3:36
5.	"Silent Night"	1:38
6.	"Christmas TV"	4:30
