= OEP =

OEP may refer to:

== Government ==
- Office of Emergency Preparedness, United States, 1968–1973
- Office of Emergency Planning (Ireland), formed 2001
- Office for Environmental Protection, United Kingdom, formed 2021
- Országos Egészségbiztosítási Pénztár (National Health Insurance Fund), Hungary, formed 1993

== Other businesses and organisations ==
- One Equity Partners, the private equity affiliate of JPMorgan Chase
- Open Energy Platform, a project providing database infrastructure for open energy system models
- Optometric Extension Program
- Oxfordshire Economic Partnership

== Other uses ==
- Octaethylporphyrin, a chemical
- Open Educational Practices
- Open enrollment period, during which employees may change health insurer
- Occurrence Exceedance Probability, a risk curve used in catastrophe modeling
