= Instant Coffee Baby =

Studio album by The Wave Pictures
- Released: 5 May 2008
- Recorded: May 2007
- Genre: Alternative rock
- Length: 46:29
- Label: Moshi Moshi Records / Little Teddy Recordings
- Producer: Simon Trought

The Wave Pictures chronology
Sophie (2006)	Instant Coffee Baby (2008)	If You Leave It Alone (2009)

Professional ratings
Review scores
Source	Rating
AllMusic	3/5 stars
Drowned in Sound	4/5 stars
The Guardian	3/5 stars
The Line of Best Fit	9/10 stars
NME	4/5 stars

Instant Coffee Baby is the seventh album by The Wave Pictures, their debut on Moshi Moshi Records.

== Track listing ==
Songs written by David Tattersall except "Cassius Clay" by David Tattersall, David Ivar Herman Dune and Toby Goodshank.

1. "Leave The Scene Behind"
2. "I Love You Like A Madman"
3. "We Come Alive"
4. "Kiss Me"
5. "Instant Coffee Baby"
6. "Avocado Baby"
7. "Friday Night In Loughborough"
8. "Red Wine Teeth"
9. "Strange Fruit For David"
10. "Just Like A Drummer"
11. "I Remembered"
12. "January And December"
13. "Cassius Clay"

== Personnel ==
- David Tattersall - Guitar, Ukulele, Piano, Handclaps, Cowbell, Bongos, Frog, Lead Vocals
- Franic Rozycki - Bass Guitar, Farfisa Organ, Handclaps, Backing Vocals
- Jonny Helm - Drums, Tambourine, Handclaps, Backing Vocals
- Lisa Li Lund - Backing Vocals, Lead Vocals on "January And December"
- Darren Hayman - Backing Vocals
- Simon Trought - Handclaps, Backing Vocals
- Mark Crown - Trumpet
- Mathew Benson - Trombone
- Aki Päivärinne - Saxophone
- Dan Mayfield - Violin
