= If You Leave It Alone =

Studio album by The Wave Pictures
- Released: 4 May 2009
- Recorded: June 2008
- Genre: Alternative rock
- Label: Moshi Moshi Records
- Producer: Clemence Freschard

The Wave Pictures chronology
Instant Coffee Baby (2008)	If You Leave It Alone (2009)	Susan Rode the Cyclone (2010)

Professional ratings
Review scores
Source	Rating
Drowned in Sound	7/10 stars
The Line of Best Fit	8.5/10 stars
NME	7/10 stars

If You Leave It Alone is the eighth album by The Wave Pictures, their second on Moshi Moshi Records.

== Track listing ==
Songs written by David Tattersall except "Nothing Can Change This Love" by Sam Cooke.

1. "If You Leave It Alone"
2. "Canary Wharf"
3. "My Kiss"
4. "I Thought Of You Again"
5. "Tiny Craters In The Sand"
6. "Bumble Bee"
7. "Come On Daniel"
8. "Too Many Questions"
9. "Bye Bye Bubble Belly"
10. "Softly You, Softly Me"
11. "Strawberry Cables"
12. "Nothing Can Change This Love"

== Personnel ==
- David Tattersall - Guitar, Vocals
- Franic Rozycki - Bass Guitar, Backing Vocals
- Jonny Helm - Drums, Backing Vocals
- Stanley Brinks - Trumpets, Clarinets, Saxophones, German Banjo, Backing Vocals
- Clemence Freschard - Additional Percussions, Backing Vocals, Queer Flute
- Toby Goodshank - Harmony on "Canary Wharf" and "Tiny Craters In The Sand"
- Isabel Martin - Harmony on "Tiny Craters In The Sand"
