= With Days Like This as Cheap as Chewing Gum, Why Would Anyone Want to Work? =

EP from the band Hot Club de Paris

EP by Hot Club de Paris
- Released: February 8, 2010
- Recorded: 2010
- Genres: Indie rock, math rock
- Label: Moshi Moshi
- Producer: Hot Club de Paris

Hot Club de Paris chronology
Live at Dead Lake (2008)	With Days Like This as Cheap as Chewing Gum, Why Would Anyone Want to Work? (2010)	The Rise And Inevitable Fall Of The High School Suicide Cluster Band (2010)

With Days Like This As Cheap As Chewing Gum, Why Would Anyone Want To Work? is the third offering from English indie band Hot Club De Paris. It was released on Moshi Moshi records on hand numbered limited 10" vinyl and digital formats. The band went on a UK tour in support of the EP and its follow-up The Rise and Inevitable Fall of the High School Suicide Cluster Band in February 2010.

== Track listing ==
1. Dance A Ragged Dance
2. Fuck You, The Truth!
3. Dog Tired At The Spring Dance Marathon
4. They Shoot Horses Don't They?
5. Noses Blazing
6. Extra Time, Sudden Death
