= Free The Pterodactyl Three =

Free The Pterodactyl 3

Studio album by Hot Club de Paris
- Released: January 17, 2011
- Recorded: 2010
- Genres: Indie rock, math rock
- Length: 43:34
- Label: Moshi Moshi Records
- Producer: Hot Club De Paris

Free The Pterodactyl 3 is the third album by Hot Club de Paris. It was released CD through Moshi Moshi Records on January 17, 2011. It is a collection of tracks from the EP's With Days Like This As Cheap As Chewing Gum, Why Would Anyone Want To Work? and The Rise And Inevitable Fall Of The High School Suicide Cluster Band previously released in 2010.

AllMusic stated in its review of the album, "This an exhilarating, befuddling, and ultimately joyous excursion into a completely new style of pop music, and it would immediately go double-platinum in a rational music marketplace."

== Track listing ==
All lyrics are written by Hot Club De Paris; all music is composed by Hot Club De Paris.

Free the Pterodactyl 3
No.	Title	Length
1.	"I'm Not In Love and Neither Are You"	3:06
2.	"The Rise and Fall of The High School Suicide Cluster Band"	3:18
3.	"Fuck You, The Truth!"	3:18
4.	"Biggie Smalls And The Ghetto Slams"	3:32
5.	"Free The Pterodactyl 3"	4:06
6.	"Dance A Ragged Dance"	4:16
7.	"Dog Tired At The Spring Dance Marathon"	3:16
8.	"They Shoot Horses, Dont They?"	2:38
9.	"The White Town Express (Get High Stay Low)"	4:10
10.	"Three Albums In and Still no Ballad"	3:44
11.	"Noses Blazing"	2:11
12.	"Extra Time, Sudden Death"	5:59
Total length:		43:34

== Personnel ==
Band

- Paul Rafferty- Lead Vocals, Baritone Guitar, Bass
- Matthew Smith - Guitar, Backing Vocals
- Alasdair Smith- Drums, Percussion. Backing Vocals

Additional personnel

- Genevieve Rosa Zambina, Graham Jones, Andrew Hunt, Kate Smith, Andrew Donovan, Christopher McIntosh, Sam Walkerdine- Additional Vocals

Production

- Hot Club De Paris - production
- Robert Whiteley - Engineer, Mix
- Paul Rafferty - Sleeve Artwork
