= The Wave Pictures =

English rock band

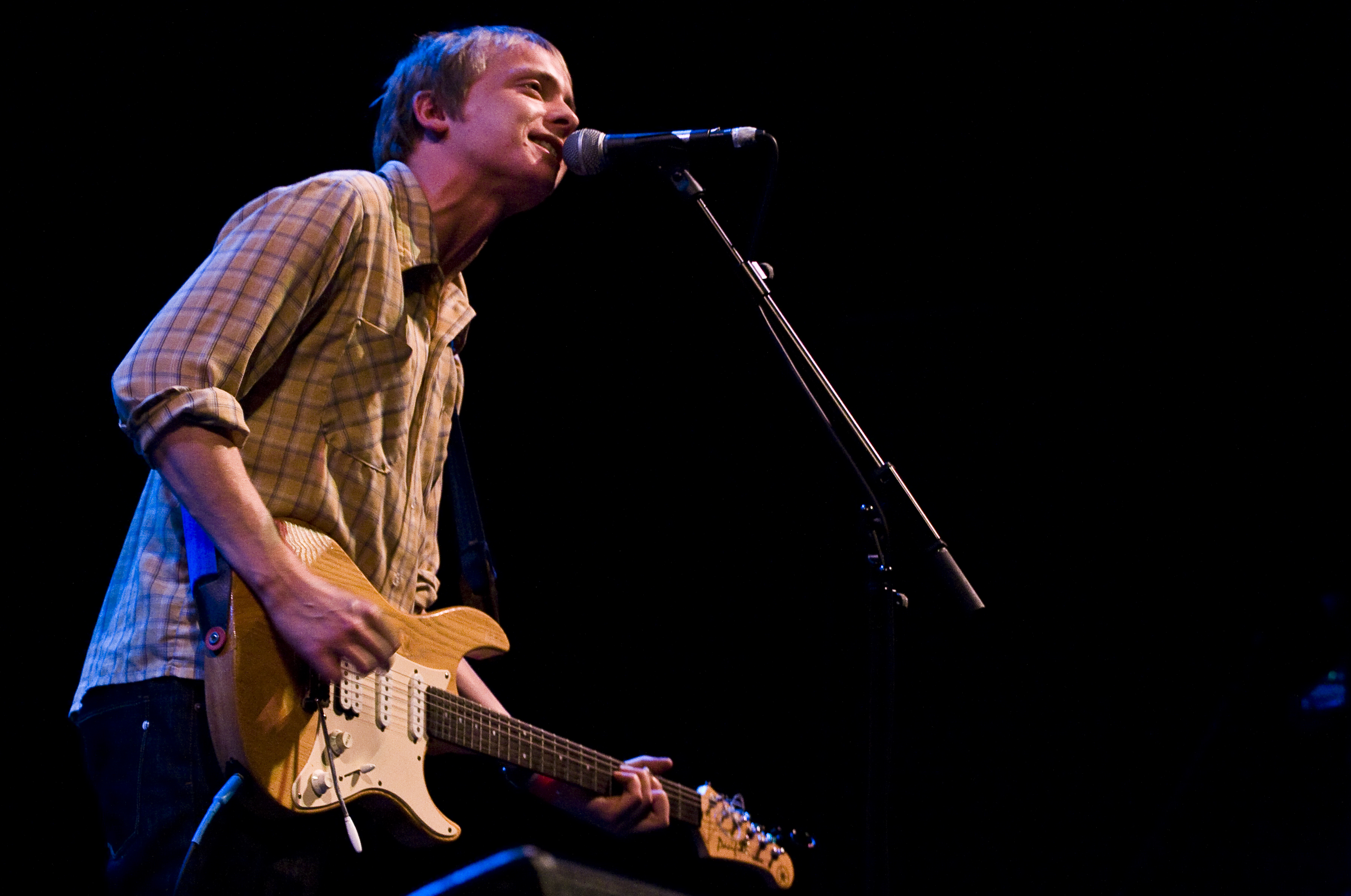

Background information
- Origin: Wymeswold, England
- Genres: Alternative rock
- Years active: 1998–present
- Labels: Moshi Moshi; Little Teddy Recordings; Wymeswold Records
- Members: David Tattersall; Franic Rozycki; Jonny Helm

The Wave Pictures are an English rock band consisting of David Tattersall (vocals and guitar), Franic Rozycki (bass guitar) and Jonny Helm (drums).

== Background ==
The band has its origins in a group called Blind Summit, which David and Franic formed with Hugh Noble in Wymeswold, near Loughborough in Leicestershire, in 1998. The band changed its name to the Wave Pictures and Hugh was eventually permanently replaced by Jonny Helm. They recorded and self-released a string of albums before settling in London.

The Guardian has described their work as "charming, witty pop songs shot through with Jonathan Richman's gawky glee and Suede's doomed provincial romanticism... They owe a certain debt to The Smiths, and Tattersall has Morrissey's knack of marrying the ridiculous and the sublime".

The band is closely linked to artists Darren Hayman (formerly of Hefner), Herman Dune, Daniel Johnston, Jeffrey Lewis and the Mountain Goats, all of whom they have collaborated with live and on record.

In 2014, Billy Childish produced, played on and co-wrote (with Dave Tattersall) most of the songs on Great Big Flamingo Burning Moon.

Their 2016 album, A Season in Hull, was recorded live using a single microphone and released on vinyl only.

Tattersall and Rozycki also began a side project, the Surfing Magazines, with Slow Club member Charles Watson, releasing their first self-titled album in 2017 and then another, The Badgers of Wymeswold, in 2021.

== Discography ==
=== Studio albums ===
- Just Watch Your Friends Don't Get You (2003)
- More Street, Less TV (2003)
- The Airplanes at Brescia (2004)
- The Hawaiian Open Mic Night (2005)
- Catching Light: the Songs of André Herman Düne (2006)
- Sophie (2006)
- Instant Coffee Baby (2008)
- If You Leave It Alone (2009)
- Susan Rode the Cyclone (2010)
- Beer in the Breakers (2011)
- Long Black Cars (2012)
- The Songs of Jason Molina (2013)
- City Forgiveness (2013)
- Great Big Flamingo Burning Moon (2015)
- A Season in Hull (2016)
- Bamboo Diner in the Rain (2016)
- Brushes with Happiness (2018)
- Look Inside Your Heart (2018)
- When the Purple Emperor Spreads His Wings (2022)
- Gained / Lost (2026)

=== Singles/EPs ===
- "We Dress Up Like Snowmen"/"Now You Are Pregnant" (2007)
- "I Love You Like a Madman" (2008)
- "Strange Fruit for David" (2008)
- "Just Like a Drummer" (2008)
- Pigeon EP (2008)
- "If You Leave It Alone" (2009)
- "If I Should Fall Behind" (2009) (b/w Darren Hayman "Girls in Their Summer Clothes", Bruce Springsteen tribute)
- "Watching Charlie's Angels" (2009)
- "Strawberry Cables" (2009)
- Sweetheart EP (2010)
- "Johnny Helm Sings" (2010)
- "I Know I Fucked Up / Who Hung the Monkey" (2011, Belka / Fortuna Pop!) – with Darren Hayman
- "Little Surprise" (2011)
- "Blue Harbour" (2011)
- "In Her Kitchen" (2011)
- "Eskimo Kiss" (2012)
- Salt EP (2012)
- "Spaghetti" (2013)
- "Lisbon" (2013)
- "The Woods" / "The Ropes" (2013)
- Helen EP (2014)
- "I Could Hear the Telephone (3 Floors Above Me)" (2014)
- "Pea Green Coat" (2014)
- "The Fire Alarm" (2015)
- "Pool Hall" (2016)
- "The Running Man" (2016)
- Canvey Island Baby EP (2017)
- "Now I Want to Hoover My Brain Clean" (2017)
- French Cricket EP (2022)

=== Compilation appearances ===
- Moshi Moshi: The First 10 Years (2004)
- This Town Ain't Big Enough for the 22 of Us (2006)
- Berlin Songs Vol. 2 (2007)
- Cooperative Music Sampler Vol. 6 (2008)
- Moshi Moshi Singles Compilation (2008)
- Play Some Pool (Bruce Springsteen tribute) (2009)
- Moshi Moshi Acoustic Compilation (2009)
- I Thought of You Again: Outtakes and Alternative Versions (free with Spanish magazine Rockdelux) (2011)
- Darren Hayman & Fika Recordings Advent Calendar (2011)
- Weary Engine Blues: Crossroads (2013)

== Related appearances ==
- Streets of Philadelphia (2003) (André Herman Düne and David Tattersall)
- Madrid (2007) (Darren Hayman and The Wave Pictures)
- Hayman, Watkins, Trout and Lee (2008) (Hayman, Watkins, Trout and Lee)
- Dan of Green Gables (2008) (Dan of Green Gables)
- Jonny "Huddersfield" Helm (2008) (Jonny "Huddersfield" Helm)
- Happy For a While (2009) (David Tattersall)
- Stanley Brinks and the Wave Pictures (2009) (Stanley Brinks and The Wave Pictures)
- The Lobster Boat (2011) (David Tattersall and Howard Hughes)
- How to Draw Sandwiches (2011) (The Last Swimmers - Franic Rozycki & Dave Tattersall)
- Another One Just Like That (2010) (Stanley Brinks and The Wave Pictures)
- Darren Hayman - January Songs (2011) - appears on "Who Hung the Monkey?"
- Little Martha (2012) (David Tattersall - instrumental solo)
- Gin (2014) (Stanley Brinks and The Wave Pictures)
- My Ass (2015) (Stanley Brinks and The Wave Pictures)
- Tequila Island (2019) (Stanley Brinks and The Wave Pictures)
