= Fans of Kate =

English indie rock band

- Origin: High Wycombe, London, England
- Genre: Indie rock
- Years active: 2004–2005
- Labels: Headwrecker Records, Moshi Moshi Records
- Past members: Jamie Brown – guitar, drum machine, keys Jez Dixon – keys, lead vocals Nick Eburah – drums Steve Hurdle – guitar, backing vocals Raphael Knapp – bass
- Website: http://www.fansofkate.com

Fans of Kate was a British indie rock band who described themselves as a "haircut band from London", and they toured the UK between May 2004 and December 2005. They played guitar and piano driven pop-rock and cited influences such as Blur, Radiohead, Grandaddy and Broken Social Scene.

== History ==
=== Formation ===
The band first started to play music together at Buckinghamshire Chilterns University College in High Wycombe circa 2003. Jamie and Steve (the guitarists) started to jam together and formed the band Reagan with some friends. Reagan produced an EP and shared the stage with an up-and-coming Bloc Party in December 2003. Reagan's vocalist, Jez Dixon got married not long after and the band decided to take some time off. After getting back together the band discovered their new songs were taking them in a different direction. This new direction would become Fans of Kate.

=== Band name ===
The name Fans of Kate came about during a drive through Queen's Park in London in summer 2004 after a game of pitch and putt. The band were on their way to a gig and on the lookout for a new name. They had decided they wanted to be fans of something, but didn't know what. Steve Hurdle (guitarist) decided "the next fit girl we saw, we'd be fans of her". The next young lady to walk past the van was called Kate.

=== Releases ===
Poster from Marr's Bar, Worcester

The band released 1,500 numbered copies of their debut EP Fans Of Kate EP on Headwrecker Records on 15 November 2004. This was followed up by the single "I Don't Know What To Do With My Hands" which the band worked on alongside producer Dan Swift (Snow Patrol, The Cooper Temple Clause). "I Don't Know What To Do With My Hands" was released initially as a one track promo on Headwrecker in March 2005, and then officially as a three track single on Moshi Moshi Records on 11 April 2005. Both the EP and the single were available from HMV's online store for a short time.

=== Touring ===
Fans of Kate had three official tours and played around 150 gigs in venues such as Barfly and Club NME. They supported Electric Six in February 2005 and Dogs Die in Hot Cars in May 2005. An unofficial fourth tour with less frequent gigs interspersed the rest of the year.

==== Tour dates ====
Pingpong Tour	Tour 2: The Revenge	Tourminator 3: Rise of the Machine	Tour 4
June–July 2004	October–November 2004	January–April 2005	May–December 2005

=== Split ===
On 13 October 2005, Jamie Brown revealed on his blog that he had left the band:

So here I am, this is it, this is me, I am alone now. Jamie and FOK had a meeting and it was decided by both parties about three months previous that I didn't belong there, I just cant do the new direction that is happening, I used to love playing those songs but I just cant do it in the way its going, I cant. We are all still friends an all, it's incredibly amicable but the band I loved being in is gone.

This was confirmed on the band's website on 7 November. Fans of Kate continued to gig until December 2005 after which they appeared to go on hiatus. In January 2006, a new band was revealed called New Adventures. This band features the original Fans of Kate lineup minus Jamie, plus a new member, Helen Fisher, who sings and plays keys.

== Discography ==
=== Singles and EPs ===
- Fans of Kate EP (Headwrecker Records 2004) #82 UK

1. "Tape 23"
2. "A Pattern"
3. "Keep Warm (The Doo Doo Song)"

- "I Don't Know What To Do With My Hands" (Moshi Moshi Records 2004)

1. "I Don't Know What To Do With My Hands"
2. "Tape 23" (Simian Mobile Disco Remix)
3. "A Brief Guide to Coward Rock" (demo)
