= Casiokids =

Norwegian synthpop band

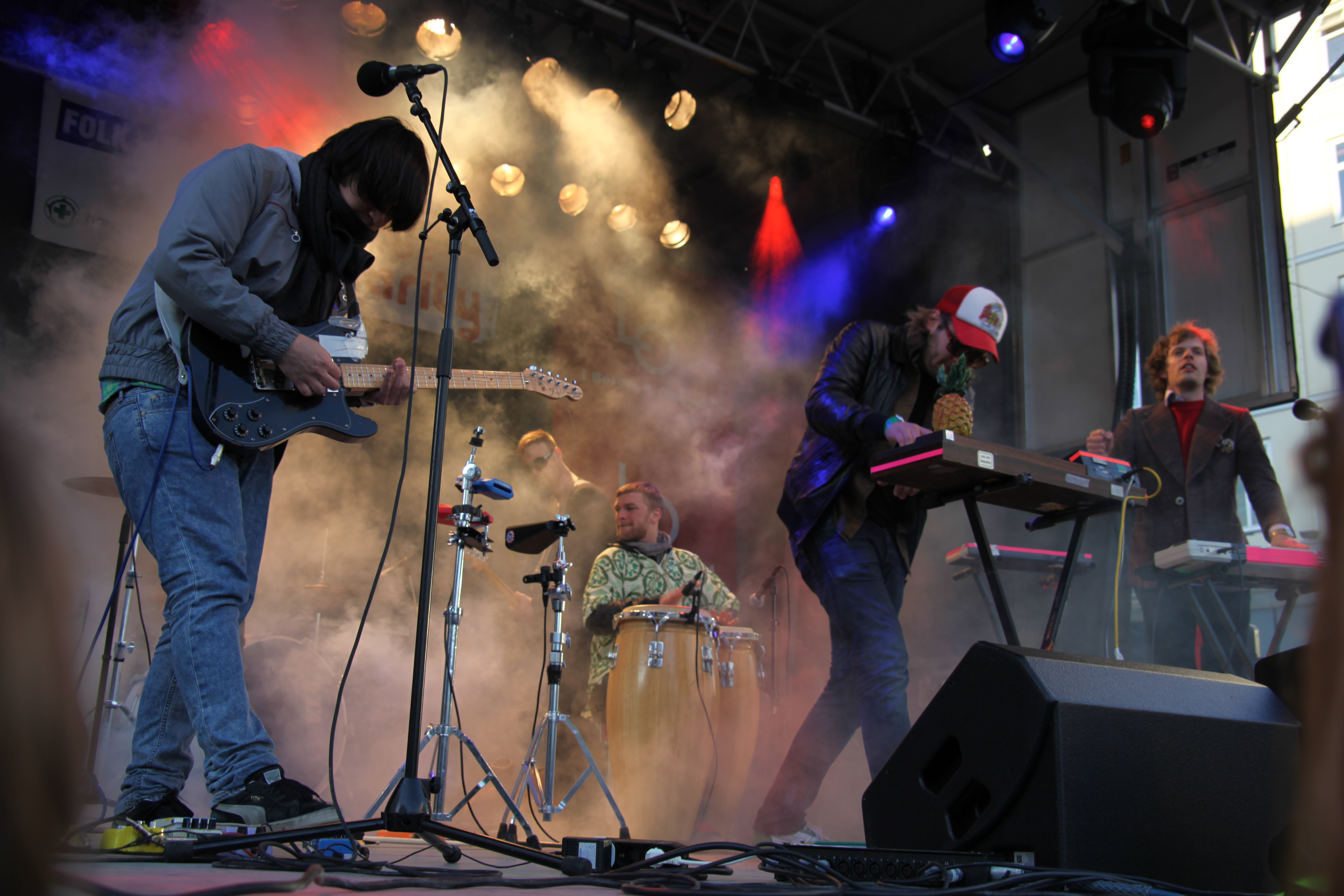

Background information
- Origin: Bergen, Norway
- Genres: Synthpop, neo-psychedelia
- Years active: 2005–present
- Labels: Moshi Moshi Records (UK); Polyvinyl Records (U.S.)
- Members: Ketil Kinden Endresen; Fredrik Øgreid Vogsborg; Omar Johnsen; Kjetil Bjøreid Aabø
- Website: www.casiokids.com

Casiokids are a Norwegian synthpop ensemble from Bergen, and Stavanger formed in 2005. The band consists of Ketil Kinden Endresen, Fredrik Øgreid Vogsborg, Omar Johnsen and Kjetil Bjøreid Aabø. Associated musicians are Joachim Amundsen Trana, Eirik Utne, Einar Olsson, Geir Svensson and Snorre Sturla Lyngstad. They are signed with Universal Records in Norway, Polyvinyl Records in North America, Flake Records in Japan, Pop Frenzy in Australia and Moshi Moshi Records for the rest of the world.

After releasing the single "Grønt lys i alle ledd / Togens hule" in the United Kingdom, the band was described by NME as "the best thing to come out of Norway since black metal." The band has been compared to fellow Norwegian artists The Whitest Boy Alive, Röyksopp, and Annie. They have released an album named Topp Stemning På Lokal Bar that includes the song "Fot i hose", which was included in the comedy series Friday Night Dinner (as transitional music) and on the soundtrack for the football video game FIFA 10, and listed by the NME as the fourth best new song of the week. They are currently managed by Christopher Wareing.

In the summer of 2010 legendary Norwegian pop band a-ha gave away four separate prizes of one million kroner each to Norwegian artists who they felt had the most export potential at that time. Casiokids was one of the recipients along with Susanne Sundfør, Moddi and Shining.

In October 2011 the band released their new album Aabenbaringen over Aaskammen in North America, Norway and Japan, with a worldwide release scheduled for January 2012. In November 2011 Casiokids visited Japan for the first time.

Casiokids announced their fourth album Tid for Heim on 8 May 2024, their first new material in 13 years. In 2026, they collaborated with the Irish hip-hop group, Kneecap, on the title track of their album Fenian.

== Discography ==
- Fuck MIDI (2007)
- Topp Stemning På Lokal Bar (2010)
- Aabenbaringen over aaskammen (2011)
- Tid for Hjem (2024)
- Sjelden vare (2025)
