= Teeth (electronic band) =

Teeth (also known as TEETH!!!, T3eth, and TΣΣTH) is an electronic pop punk band formed in 2008 by Veronica So (vocals), Simon Leahy (production), and Simon Whybray (drums) in Dalston, England. The band gained notoriety online from a series of internet pranks including hacking Lady Gaga's Twitter account and impersonating Pope Benedict XVI. Teeth's debut album Whatever was released in September 2011 on Moshi Moshi Records.

== History ==
=== Releases ===
Teeth first emerged online on MySpace in 2008. After the release of these early tracks on Jammers 2008–2009. <3 U, a limited 10-track tape on MÏLK records in 2010,

Teeth released their first single "See Spaces" digitally with remixes and as a 7" vinyl on Moshi Moshi Records featuring "Time Changes" as a B-side. The single was met with primarily positive reviews, The Guardian described the single as "spacey and shimmery yet somehow serrated summertime synth-punk in slow motion." The "See Spaces" video directed by Ollie Evans premiered in August 2010 and was described as "devoid of the highly edited, stroboscopic rainbow styles that [is] usually associate with the videos from bands of similar genre... a prime example of how TEETH is truly a unique group and should not be heavily compared with their contemporaries," by The End of Being.

"See Spaces" was featured in the Pro Evolution Soccer 2013 soundtrack and was featured in a 2013 Adidas advertisement. Their follow up single "Care Bear" was released on 25 July 2011 as a 7" vinyl and digital download. The video consisted of the band's male fans in drag lip-syncing the track via webcam.

Their album Whatever was released on 19 September 2011 by Moshi Moshi Records and was met with semi-positive reviews. Whatever was rated a 7/10 by NME, the BBC said "the album is obnoxious and ephemeral, but it also showcases a delirious creativity." Following the album, the singles "Flowers" and "U R 1" were released as digital downloads.

Teeth premiered their new single "Shelter" on 18 March 2014 with a video shot by Michael Prommisit in a Shanghai nuclear fallout shelter converted into a nightclub.

=== Twitter ===
Teeth used Twitter to enact a series of hoaxes and pranks that fooled media outlets and the general public. For the first nine months their account was an impersonation of popular English writer Will Self, who later publicly addressed the fraud on the radio program Question Time and on his personal website.

Teeth hacked Lady Gaga's account in 2009 and wrote a series of tweets that read "POPWRLDSUCKZ!!! PUNX UNITE!!!! <3."

Teeth crafted a screenshot of a tweet that appeared to be made by Pope Benedict XVI that stated ""I am the Pope and the Pope smokes dope...RT if you smoke dope" and faked reports from The Guardian, CNN, BBC News and a false NME magazine cover.

== Members ==
Veronica So is the founder of the futurist culture publication L_A_N Magazine and has worked as a journalist and editor for Vice and Dazed & Confused.

Simon Leahy is currently in a second band, bottoms, with singer Jake Dibeler and drummer Micheal Prommasit. He also organises the Bushwick drag festival, BushWig, and the NYC Porn Film Festival.

Simon Whybray works as a graphic design artist and runs JACK댄스 night at Power Lunches in London.

== Discography ==
Albums

- Jammers 2008–2009. <3 U (2010, MÏLK records)
- Whatever (2010, Moshi Moshi Records)

Singles

- "See Spaces" (2010, Moshi Moshi Records)
- "See Spaces" Remixes (2010, Moshi Moshi Records)
- "Care Bear" (2011, Moshi Moshi Records)
- "Flowers" (2011, Moshi Moshi Records)
- "U R 1" (2011, Moshi Moshi Records)

Appears On

- I AM V: 5 Years of Loud & Quiet (2010, Loud & Quiet Cassettes)
