= Philip Koomen =

British furniture designer and maker (born 1953)

Philip Koomen (born 1953) is a British furniture designer and maker.

Koomen studied Furniture Design and Technology and Wood Science at High Wycombe College of Art and Technology (now Buckinghamshire New University), a leading centre for furniture design. He makes bespoke furniture using wood that he largely selects himself. His combined workshop and showroom (Philip Koomen Furniture, established in 1975) is in a 19th-century former coaching barn (Wheelers Barn) near Checkendon in south Oxfordshire.

In 1984, Koomen gained a scholarship from the Worshipful Company of Furniture Makers to visit German and Dutch studios and workshops. In 2001, he was awarded another scholarship to undertake doctoral research with Brunel University, developing a practice-based design strategy for sustainable development. He has exhibited at the River and Rowing Museum in Henley-on-Thames and has regular exhibitions at his own workshop. He is advisor to the OneOak project run by the Sylva Foundation, following the full life story of one oak tree.

Koomen received his doctorate in 2007. He is a Fellow of the Royal Society of Arts and the Chartered Society of Designers.

== Books ==
- Out of the Woods — Philip Koomen: a sustainable approach to furniture design. River & Rowing Museum, Henley-on-Thames, Oxfordshire, 17 September 2004 to 7 January 2005. (Exhibition catalogue.)
