= John Radcliffe Hospital =

Coordinates: 51°45′49″N 1°13′7″W

- Oxford University Hospitals NHS Foundation Trust
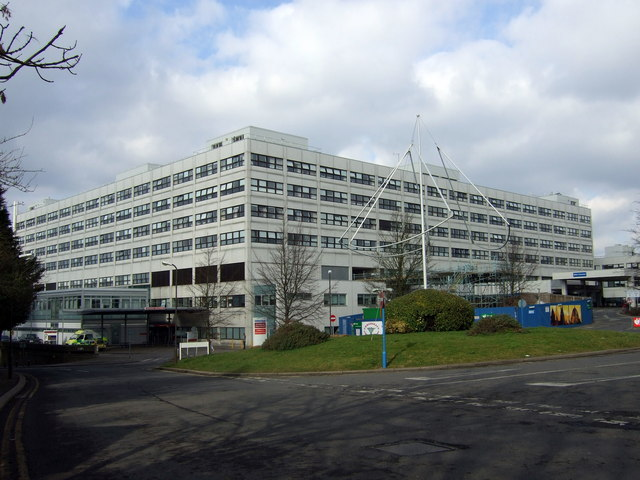
- John Radcliffe Hospital

- Location within Oxfordshire

Geography
- Location: Headington, Oxford, Oxfordshire, England

Organisation
- Care system: National Health Service
- Type: Teaching, military, district general
- Affiliated university: University of Oxford; Oxford Brookes University

Services
- Emergency department: Yes (major trauma centre)

History
- Founded: 1973

Links
- Website: www.ouh.nhs.uk/hospitals/jr/

John Radcliffe Hospital (informally known as the JR or the John Radcliffe) is a large tertiary teaching hospital in Oxford, England. It is a part of the Oxford University Hospitals NHS Foundation Trust and is named after John Radcliffe, an 18th-century physician and Oxford University graduate, who endowed the Radcliffe Infirmary, the main hospital for Oxford from 1770 until 2007.

It is the main teaching hospital for Oxford University and Oxford Brookes University, and incorporates the Oxford University Medical School.

== History ==
The distinctive large white-tiled structure occupies a prominent position on Headington Hill, on the outskirts of Oxford.

JR1: This was the initial hospital building, opened in 1972. It houses women's services and neonatology. The second building, JR2, opened in 1979 and is much larger. It contains most of the other specialist services for the region. Other facilities were then added to the site, including the University of Oxford's Centre for Functional Magnetic Resonance Imaging (fMRI) of the Brain.

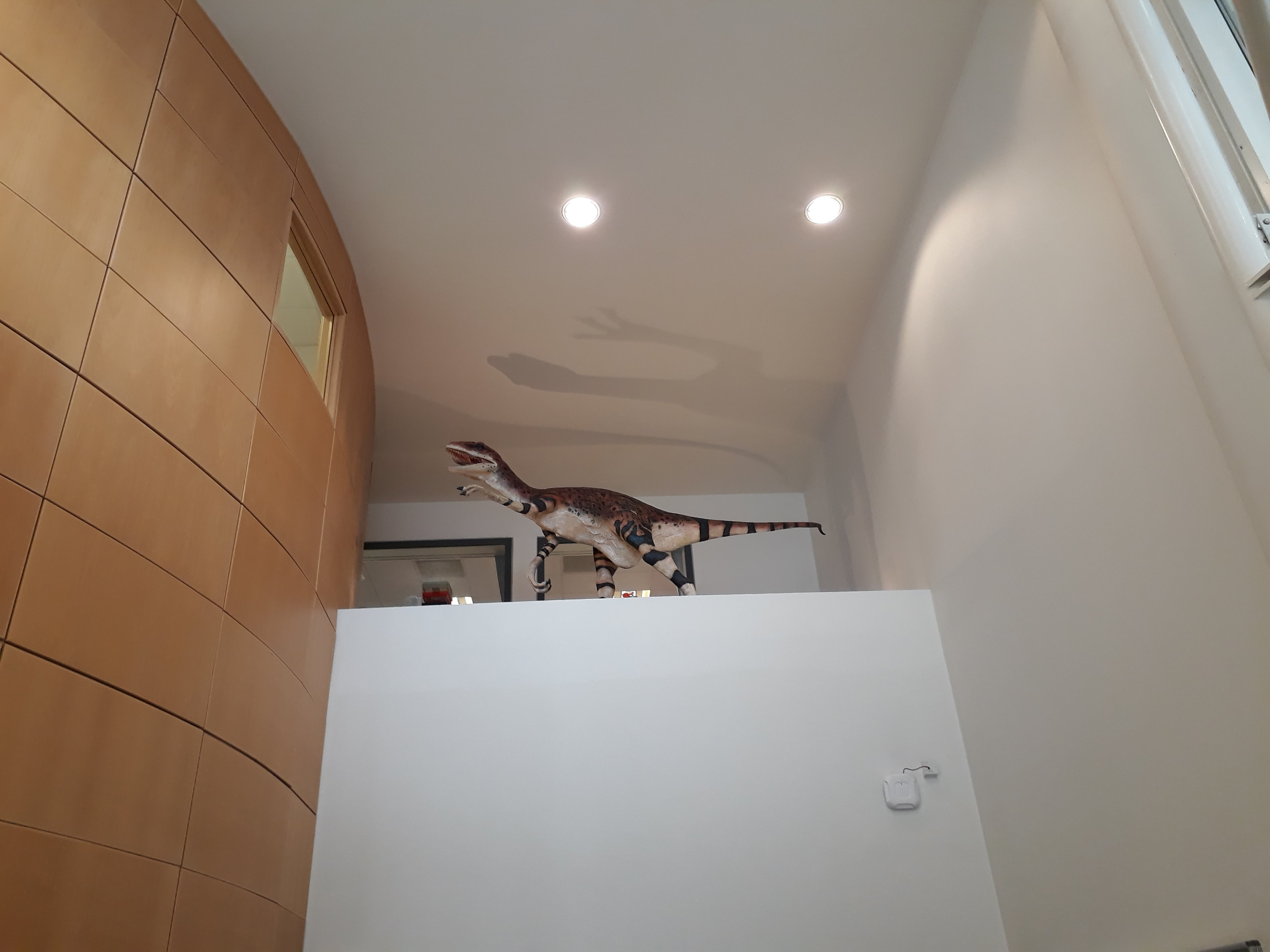
Model Utahraptor at the entrance of John Radcliffe Children's Hospital

The West Wing: With the closure of the Radcliffe Infirmary and consolidation of the other hospital sites in Oxford, a further large expansion took place, the facilities for which were procured under a Private Finance Initiative contract in 2003. The works, which were designed by Austin-Smith:Lord and undertaken by Carillion at a cost of £134 million, were completed in December 2006. This new complex, known as the West Wing, involved the construction of the new Oxford Children's Hospital, the relocated Oxford Eye Hospital, and the departments of neurosciences/head and neck and of Ear Nose & Throat (ENT). The Queen and The Duke of Edinburgh officially commemorated the opening of the new West Wing and Children's Hospital at a special ceremony in late November 2008 in front of patients, staff, fundraisers and supporters who had helped raise the £15 million needed to build the Children's Hospital. In 2017 the Oxford University Natural History Museum donated a model Utahraptor for the entrance to the Children's Hospital.

== Departments and units ==
The main parts of the hospital are as follows:

- Oxford Children's Hospital is located in the West Wing complex; it was opened in 2007
- Oxford Eye Hospital is located in the West Wing, on Level LG1; it transferred from the old Radcliffe Infirmary in 2007
- The Nuffield Laboratory of Ophthalmology (NLO) is located with the Oxford Eye Hospital in the West Wing; it was also transferred from the old Radcliffe Infirmary in 2007

In 2012, the hospital was designated as a major trauma centre, covering the Thames Valley area.

== Research ==
Oxford University Hospitals NHS Foundation Trust (OUH) is the NHS Host, with the University of Oxford as the Academic Partner, for one of the leading Biomedical Research Centres (BRC) in the UK. The National Institute for Health and Care Research (NIHR) Oxford Biomedical Research Centre (OxBRC) was one of the 11 original BRCs in 2007, and was awarded £114 million by the UK Department of Health (DH) for its third tranche of research, to begin in April 2017. At the same time, the nearby Oxford Health NIHR BRC, also partnered by the University of Oxford, was awarded a further £12 million, bringing a total of £126 million in research funds to the city.

== Patients ==
Roald Dahl died there in 1990. His daughter Tessa was born there in 1957.

== See also ==
- List of hospitals in England
- Radcliffe Infirmary
- Nuffield Orthopaedic Centre
- Thames Valley Health Innovation and Education Cluster
