= Complete Surrender =

Studio album by Slow Club
- Released: 14 July 2014
- Genres: Folk, indie pop
- Length: 45:55
- Label: Caroline International
- Producer: Colin Elliot

Slow Club chronology
Paradise (2011)	Complete Surrender (2014)

Complete Surrender is the third studio album by English folk pop duo Slow Club. It was released on 14 July 2014 on independent record label Caroline International. The record was produced by Colin Elliot. The album received "Generally favorable reviews" according to review aggregator Metacritic, and peaked at number 51 on the United Kingdom Albums Chart and 43 on the Top Heatseekers chart.

== Track listing ==
Complete Surrender
No.	Title	Length
1.	"Tears Of Joy"	4:05
2.	"Everything Is New"	3:41
3.	"Suffering You, Suffering Me"	3:25
4.	"Not Mine To Love"	4:16
5.	"The Pieces"	3:21
6.	"Number One"	4:39
7.	"The Queen's Nose"	4:37
8.	"Complete Surrender"	3:23
9.	"Paraguay And Panama"	2:29
10.	"Dependable People And Things That I'm Sure Of"	3:43
11.	"Wanderer Wandering"	7:44
Total length:		45:55

- The track "Wanderer Wandering" has a hidden track on the end called "Fucking Feelings".

== Critical reception ==
Professional ratings
Aggregate scores
Source	Rating
Metacritic	74/100
Review scores
Source	Rating
AllMusic	3.5/5 stars
Drowned in Sound	8/10 stars
MusicOMH	4.5/5 stars
NME	6/10 stars
No Ripcord	7/10 stars
Pitchfork	(7.6/10)
Under the Radar	8/10 stars

On Metacritic, a website which assigns a normalised rating out of 100 from reviews by mainstream critics, it currently holds a rating of 74/100, signifying generally favorable reviews.

== Charts ==
Chart (2015)	Peak position
UK Albums (Official Charts)	51
