= Chinese American Bear =

American pop duo

Chinese American Bear 华裔美国熊
- Origin: Seattle, Washington, U.S.
- Genres: Pop, C-pop, neo-psychedelia
- Years active: 2020—present
- Labels: Modern Sky, Moshi Moshi Records
- Members: Lingbo Anne Tong (vocals, keyboards, gong); Bryce Barsten (vocals, keyboards, guitar)
- Website: chineseamericanbear.com

Chinese American Bear is an American pop duo based in Seattle, Washington, consisting of married couple Lingbo Anne Tong and Bryce Barsten. They play psychedelic C-pop music with both Mandarin and English lyrics.

== History ==
=== Founding and self-titled debut ===
Chinese American Bear consists of married couple Lingbo Anne Tong and Bryce Barsten. Tong was born in China and moved to the US as a child. Barsten was raised by conservative Christian parents on a llama farm. They have been in a relationship since they attended high school together in Spokane, Washington. Tong, a classically trained pianist, studied economics at Princeton University and completed an MBA at the University of Chicago. Barsten studied art and was part of several indie bands in New York City.

Barsten and Tong first started writing music together while Barsten was learning Mandarin. They call each other "bear" in Mandarin as a pet name, which is referenced in their band name and in the title of the first song they composed together, "Xiao Xiong" (little bear). In contrast to Barsten's earlier experiences with other bands, the music he wrote with Tong was more "fun". In an interview, Tong stated: "Bryce dragged me into this. It was never my dream to be in a rock band and tour in a rock band. But now it is my dream".

They released their first song in 2020 but started gaining fans with their 2021 song "好吗 (Hao Ma)". Their self-titled debut was released in 2022 on the Chinese label Modern Sky. KEXP called it "warm, kaleidoscopic, and compulsively addictive".

=== Wah!!! (2024) ===
Chinese American Bear released their second album, Wah!!!, in October 2024 on Moshi Moshi Records. The song "Feelin' Fuzzy (毛绒绒的感觉)" is about Tong's experiences growing up in an immigrant Chinese household and includes the Mandarin lyrics: “Do your homework! Play piano! No playing!" "Yummy Yummy Yummy (好吃好吃)" is about slurping noodles. "Kids Go Down (孩子们的时光)", which references a well-known Chinese nursery rhyme, was praised as "enchanting" by Paste Magazine. The music video was filmed on Barsten's family llama farm. The Seattle Times listed the album as one of the 15 best albums of 2024 from Washington artists. It was ranked #49 on Best albums of 2024 as voted by KEXP listeners. Chinese American Bear toured the US and Europe in November followed by a tour of 14 cities in China with the band City Flanker in December.

In 2025, Chinese American Bear opened several shows for Poppy on her They’re All Around Us tour. Their music appeared in various media that year, including season 2 of the TV show Platonic and the initial release of the video game Skate. “Bear Day” was used in the remake of The Wedding Banquet, a romantic comedy about Asian Americans. Director Andrew Ahn stated that the band's “vibe was so dreamy and childlike and hopeful and wistful”. In December, they won $10,000 from Sonic Guild, a non-profit that provides grants to musicians in Seattle.

=== Dim Sum & Then Some (2026) ===
In January 2026, Chinese American Bear released the single "NO NO YEAH YEAH (不不好啊好啊)", which started as an attempt to write a song using only the lyrics "no" and "yeah". Chinese American Bear announced their next album Dim Sum & Then Some and released a new single "All The People (所有人)" featuring an animated stop-motion music video created by Barsten. They continued to release additional singles, dropping the album in May along with a music video for "I Wanna Go Home (我想回家)". Explaining the meaning behind the song, Tong said that "home is anywhere with Bryce and our family". KEXP called the album "another collection of playful, hook-laden indie pop goodness". Chinese-American Bear also announced a tour of Europe and North America.

== Style ==
Chinese American Bear's musical style has been described as pop, neo-psychedelia, and C-pop. Under the Radar Magazine and TRILL have pointed to a sense of nostalgia in their music. They write songs in a mix of Mandarin and English and frequently reference food in their lyrics.

Their live shows are playful and interactive. Tong leads the audience in singing Mandarin and dancing. There is a background dancer in a dumpling hat or a bear hat, and the duo throw dumpling or boba plushies into the crowd. KEXP has described their live show as a "spectacle" that "felt like a dance party in an alternate dimension or a borderline overdose of MDMA".

== Discography ==
- Chinese American Bear (2022)
- Wah!!! (2024)
- Dim Sum & Then Some (2026)
