= Matt Harding (musician) =

British musician (born 1975)

- Born: 1975
- Origin: Northampton, England
- Genres: Folktronica
- Years active: 2000-present
- Labels: Moshi Moshi Records, Heavenly Records, Reluctancy
- Website: www.mattharding.co.uk

Matt Harding (born 1975) is a British musician, whose music has been described as "scuzzy electronic folk" with "lo-fi beats". Hailing from Northampton but based in London, Harding has released three albums on Moshi Moshi Records.

== Discography ==
=== Albums ===
- Tomorrow (Moshi Moshi, 2001)
- Commitment (Moshi Moshi, 2003)
- Expectation (Moshi Moshi, 2006)
- "Year" (Reluctancy, 2009)
- "Motifs"(Reluctancey 2014)
- “Rooms” (Reluctancey 2020)
- “ Sharp Keys Pull Minds “ (Reluctancey, 2020)
- " Charles" (Reluctancey 2021)
- "Zilch" (Reluctancey 2021)

=== Singles & EPs ===
- "231" (Heavenly, 2000)
- Thinking in Fours EP (Moshi Moshi, 2004)
- "Close" (Moshi Moshi, 2006)
