= New Rhodes =

British indie pop band

New Rhodes were a British indie-pop four-piece. The band was formed in 2001 when James, Joe and Jack were students together at college. During their early years the band were based in their hometown Bristol but moved to Hackney, London in 2004.

== Career ==
The band regularly toured the UK and Europe, and tours with the likes of Razorlight, Bloc Party, The Dears, Delays, Hope of the States, The Killers and The Futureheads. helped build a loyal fan base and community.

They put out seven singles and two albums. Released through Moshi Moshi Records (Hot Chip, Kate Nash, Florence and the Machine, Tom Vek and Architecture in Helsinki) and their own label Salty Cat Records.

In 2005 their second single, "You've Given Me Something That I Can't Give Back", made the UK Top 40, charting at number 38 and in 2006 the band won a 'Vodafone Live Music Award'.

Their line-up was finalised in the summer of 2006 after Desmond became their fourth drummer. Previous drummers included Dave Hounsome (2001–2002), Chun Leek (2002–2003), and Steve Bishop (2003–2006). During their career the band worked with major producers and directors including Paul Epworth, James Ford, Ian Grimble, Rich Wilkinson and Matthias Hoene.

In spring 2010 the band decided to split, playing their final gig at the Fleece & Firkin, Bristol – the same venue they played their first gig in 2001.

== Members ==
- James Williams – Vocals/Guitar
- Joe Gascoigne – Guitar
- Jack Ashdown – Bass/Vocals
- Tim Desmond – Drums/Vocals

Past members:

- Steve Bishop – Drums
- Chun Leek – Drums
- Dave Hounsome – Drums

== Discography ==
- "The Life Story of Nelson Scamp" [EP] – CD, Self-released 2002
- "I Wish I Was You" [Single] – CD + 7", Moshi Moshi 2004
- "You've Given Me Something That I Can't Give Back" [Single] – CD + 7", Moshi Moshi 2005
- "From The Beginning" [Single] – CD + 7", Moshi Moshi 2005
- "EP" U.S. [EP] – CD, So Sweet 2006
- "The History of Britain" [Single] – CD + 7", Salty Cat 2006
- Songs from the Lodge [Album] – CD, Salty Cat 2006
- "Everybody Loves a Scene" [Single] – CD, Salty Cat Records 2009
- "The Joys of Finding And Losing That Girl" [Single] – 7", Salty Cat Records 2009
- Everybody Loves a Scene [Album] – CD, Salty Cat Records 2009
- "Quando Quando Quando" [Single] – CD, Salty Cat Records 2010
