= Fulu Miziki =

Congolese afrofuturist music ensemble

Fulu Miziki is an Afrofuturist music ensemble from the Democratic Republic of the Congo, who make their own instruments, performance costumes, and masks out of garbage. Their name, Fulu Miziki, roughly translates to “music from garbage" in Lingala.

== Description ==
Based in Kinshasa, the ensemble is organized as a collective and has six members, known individually as Sekembele, Deboule, Tche Tche, Abbe La Roche, Le Meilleur and Padou. The six grew up together in Kinshasa's Ngwaka neighborhood.

In keeping with a longstanding Kinshasa tradition, the ensemble's instruments and costumes are 100% recycled. In addition to artistic goals, they bring a message of environmental awareness. Singer and drummer Sekelembele told The Guardian, “In nature there is no trash because life reuses everything. Trash is toxic if it has no other use, so we give a second life to what we pick up.”

In an interview with the Yorkshire Evening Post, a member of the group described their sound as “a pan-African message of artistic liberation, peace and an intense study of the ecological situation in both the Democratic Republic of Congo and the whole planet.”

The group's debut EP, Ngbaka, was released on February 18, 2022. According to Pitchfork, Ngbaka is "first and foremost a party record, it’s tinged with an undercurrent of urgency, imploring the listener to shake their ass in one breath."

Fulu Miziki performed at England's WOMAD festival in 2022.

In 2025 the group is undertaking a 34-city European tour from April through October.

== Discography ==
=== EPs ===
- 2022 Ngbaka (Moshi Moshi Records)
- 2024 Mokano (Moshi Moshi Records)

=== Singles ===
- 2021 Seke Bien (Moshi Moshi Records)
- 2023 Pieteron (Moshi Moshi Records)
- 2023 Pasi na Bisango (Moshi Moshi Records)
