= Buckinghamshire New University =

Multi-campus public university in England

Coordinates: 51.628°N 0.752°W

Bucks New University
- Coat of Arms
- Former names: School of Science and Art (1891); Wycombe Technical Institute (1920); High Wycombe College of Technology and Art (1961); Buckinghamshire College of Higher Education (1975); Buckinghamshire Chilterns University College (1999)
- Motto: Latin: Arte et industria
- Motto in English: By Art and Industry
- Type: Public
- Established: 2007 – gained university status 1891 – Science and Art School
- Affiliations: Million+, GuildHE
- Chancellor: Vacant
- Vice-Chancellor: Damien Page
- Students: 18,490 (2024/25)
- Undergraduates: 16,585 (2024/25)
- Postgraduates: 1,905 (2024/25)
- Other students: 125 FE
- Location: High Wycombe, Buckinghamshire, England, UK; Campus in Uxbridge, Middlesex; England, UK
- Website: bucks.ac.uk
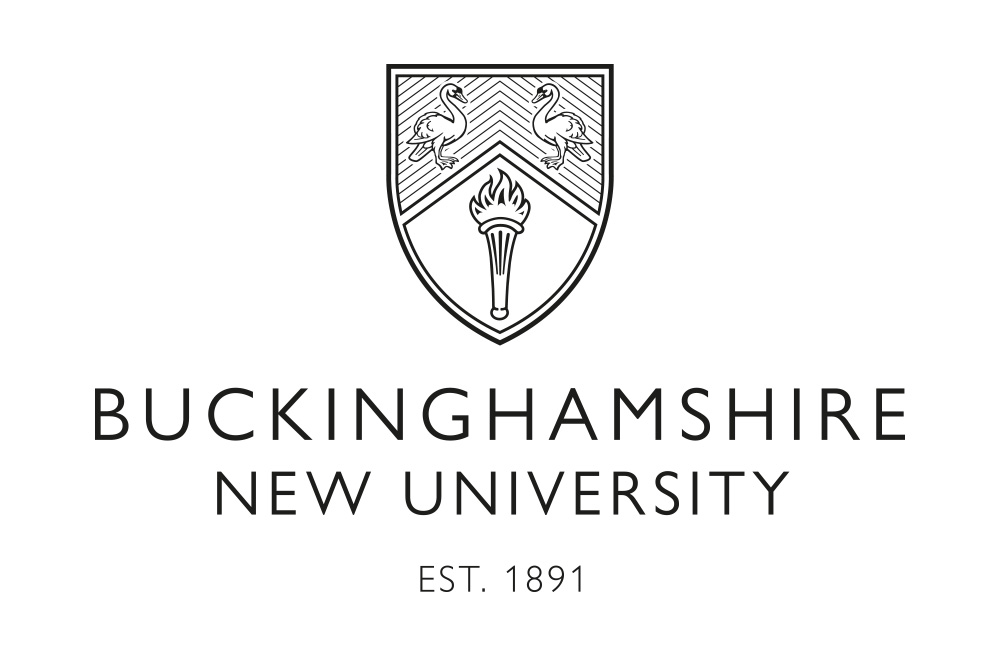

Bucks New University, (formerly known as Buckinghamshire Chilterns University College) is a public university in Buckinghamshire, England, with campuses in High Wycombe, Aylesbury, Uxbridge and Great Missenden. The institution dates from 1891, when it was founded as the School of Science and Art, and has since been known as Wycombe Technical Institute, High Wycombe College of Technology and Art and the Buckinghamshire College of Higher Education. It was a university college from 1999 until 2007, when its application for university status was accepted.

The university is a member of the GuildHE.

== History ==
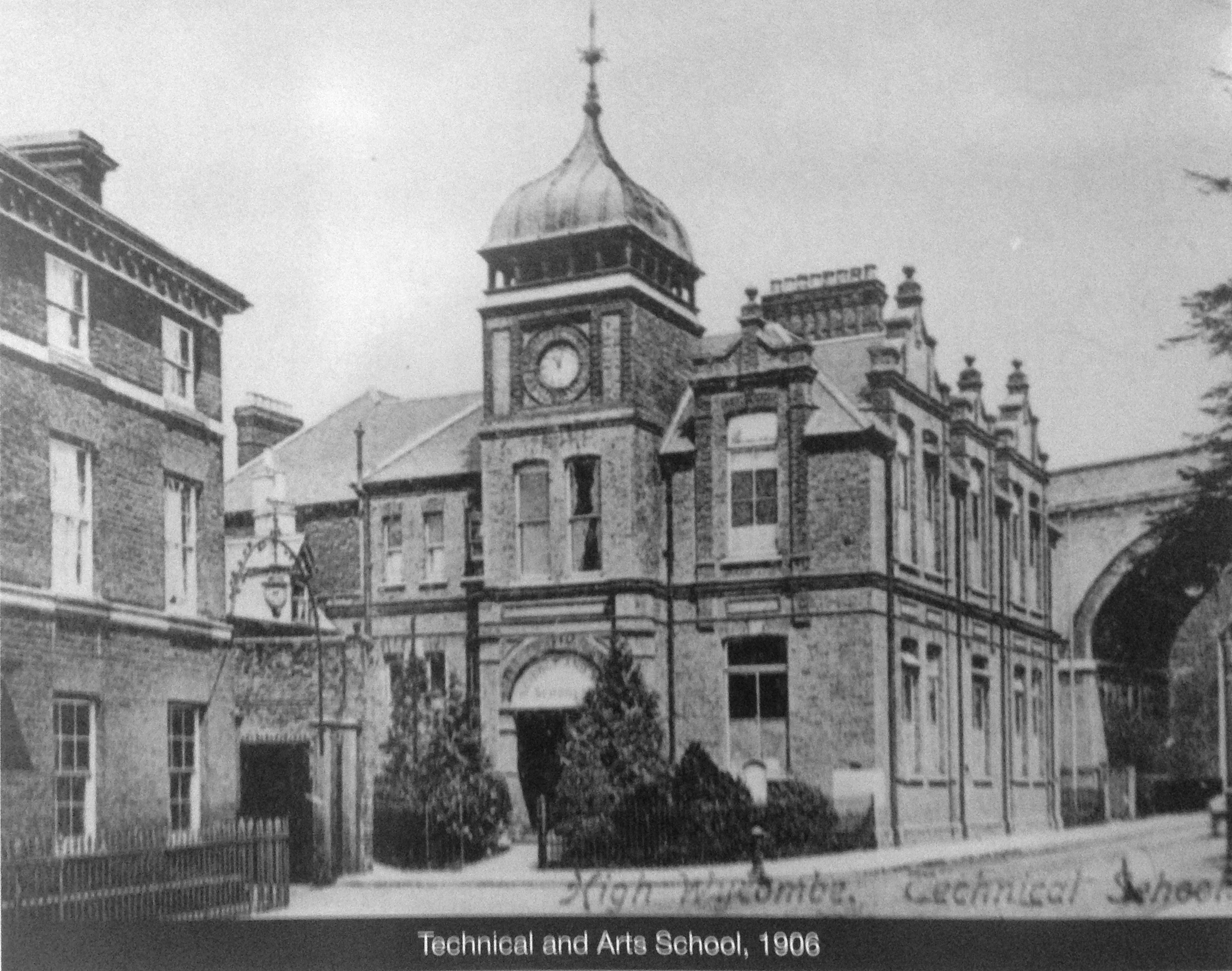
High Wycombe Technical School in 1906

=== 19th century origins ===
Founded in 1891 as the School of Science and Art, it was initially established with public funds raised from a tax on beer and spirits and set about providing evening classes to residents of High Wycombe and the local area.

=== 20th century ===
After World War I, it was renamed the Wycombe Technical Institute, forging close links with local crafts such as furniture making and cabinetry and helping to provide skills to injured war veterans in order that they might find work in local industries.

Further building took place after World War II, and on 6 May 1963 the new facilities were officially opened by the Minister of Education, Sir Edward Boyle. A new change of name, the High Wycombe College of Technology and Art accompanied this expansion.

By the 1960s, around 3,000 people worked in the manufacture of furniture in High Wycombe, and 80% of the wooden chairs manufactured in Britain were made there.

In 1975 High Wycombe College of Art and Technology merged with the Newland Park College of Education in Chalfont St Giles, and was renamed the Buckinghamshire College of Higher Education. In the same decade Missenden Abbey, a former Augustinian monastery founded in 1133, was acquired, and in May 1988 it was officially opened as a management centre by Prince Richard, Duke of Gloucester.

In March 1999 it was awarded University College status by the government, changing its name once again to Buckinghamshire Chilterns University College. Around this time the Which University guide described it as a "concrete labyrinth", which was unlikely to be "bringing home architectural awards".

=== 21st century ===
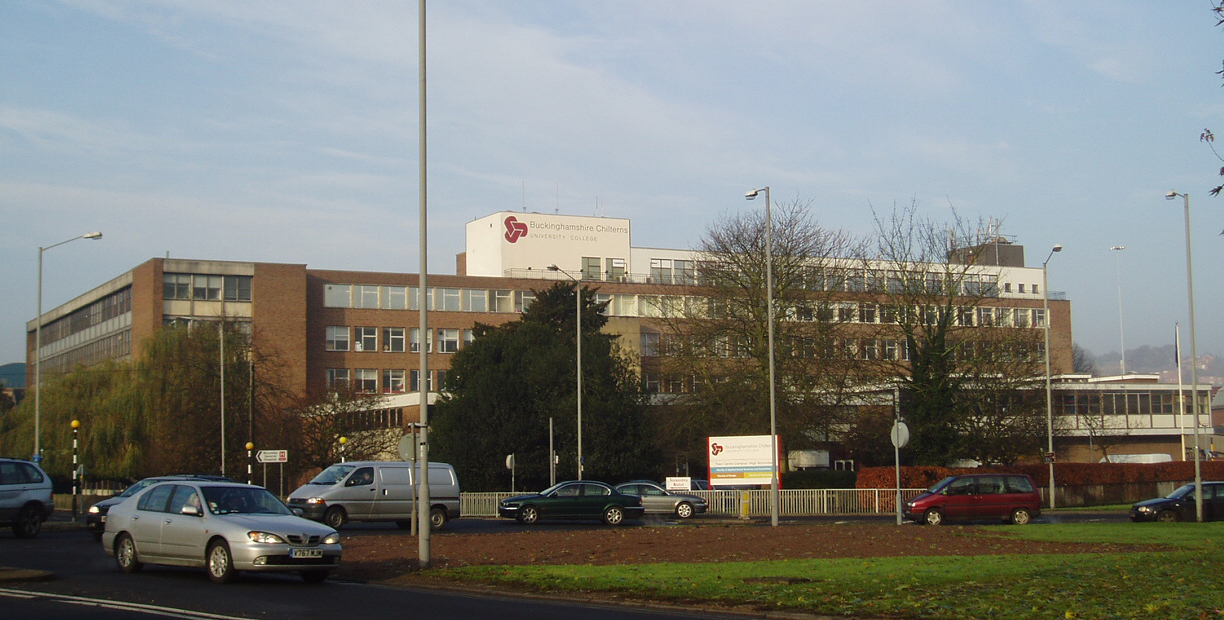
High Wycombe campus in 2004, before construction of the Gateway building

In 2007 its application for university status was approved by the Privy Council and it took its current name "Buckinghamshire New University", abbreviated to Bucks. The university changed its shortened name to 'BNU' in 2021.

Alternative names such as 'University of Wycombe', 'Wycombe University', 'University of High Wycombe', 'High Wycombe University', 'University of Buckinghamshire' and 'Buckinghamshire Chilterns University' were rejected. The chosen name prompted disapproval from the University of Buckingham for also using the county name.

Bucks had plans to consolidate its campuses into a purpose-built site near to Hughenden Park in High Wycombe on land previously owned by CompAir. While these plans fell through, the university changed plans to renovate and enlarge the main campus as well as consolidate both the Wellesbourne and Chalfont campuses onto the High Wycombe site. Additionally, new halls of residence have been built at the Hughenden Park site.

The university is a lead academic sponsor of Buckinghamshire University Technical College, a new university technical college which opened in Aylesbury in September 2013.

== Campuses ==
The university operates over four campuses: High Wycombe Campus (previously belonging to the High Wycombe College of Art and Technology), since 2009 a site in Uxbridge in the London Borough of Hillingdon, a thriving base for nursing students and applied healthcare research, a campus in Aylesbury and a site known as Missenden Abbey which is also a conference centre.

In 2008, the university disposed of two existing campuses; the Chalfont Campus (near Little Chalfont) and the Wellesbourne Campus (near Hazlemere).

=== Gateway building ===
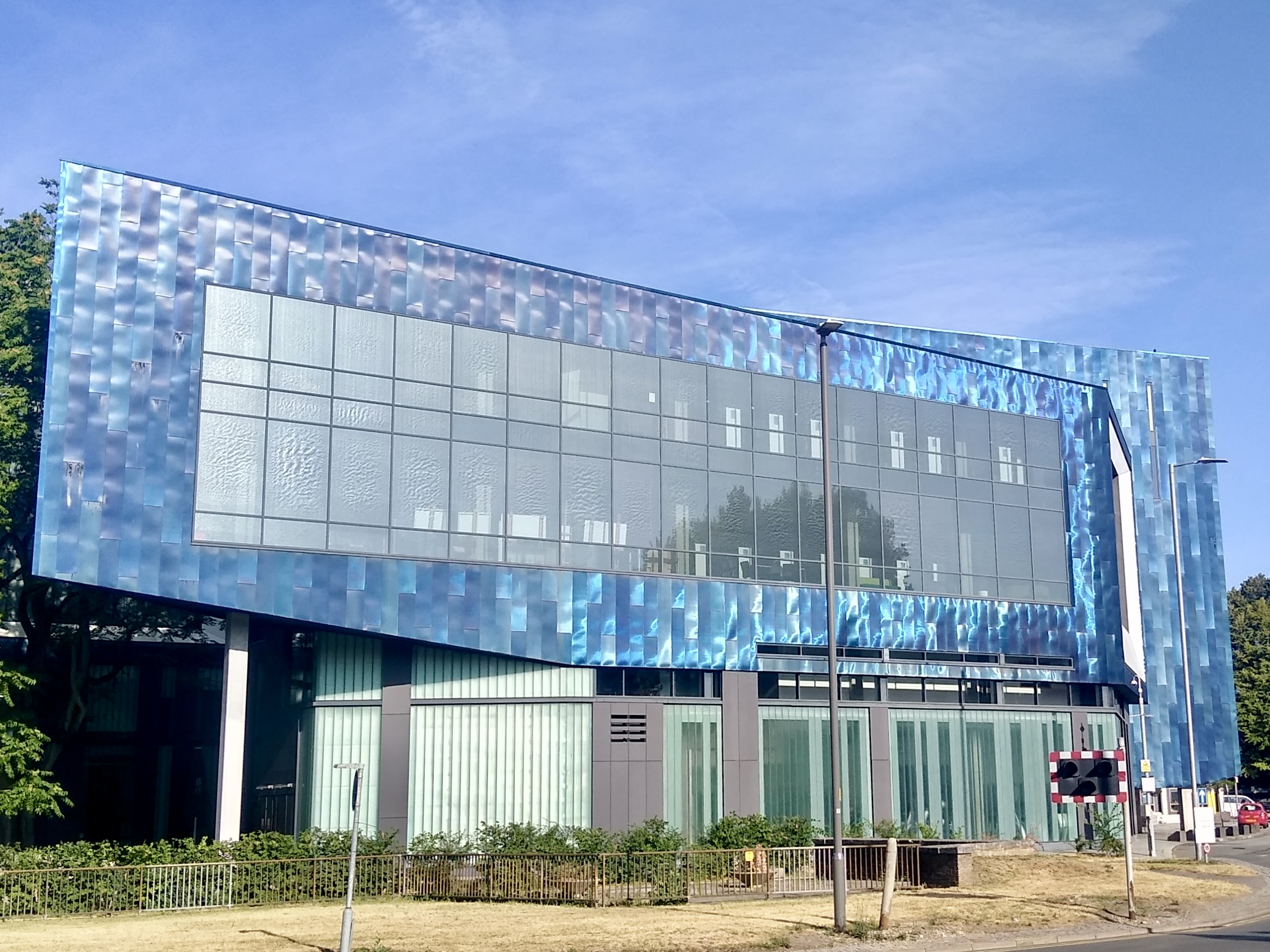
The Gateway building in 2026

The university undertook a major development of the High Wycombe Campus with a large structure, known as the Gateway Building, being built onto the front of the existing building. It won a RIBA award in 2010.

The Gateway offers facilities including a sports/events hall, fitness centre and performance lab, dance and drama studios, sound design labs, music recording studios and video production suites, a 'modern integrated learning resources centre', a cafe and meeting and conference rooms. It also has green screen facilities and a motion capture system.

=== Halls of residence ===
There is a range of accommodation at Bucks New University including halls of residence, managed houses and the student village:

- Brook Street Halls, the first to be built for Bucks New University, has 396 rooms and is situated opposite High Wycombe bus station, a five minutes' walk from the university campus.
- Hughenden Park Student Village was completed in 2009. All 410 student rooms are en-suite and the area is a 15 minutes' walk from the University's Wycombe campus.
- Windsor House is located in High Wycombe town centre. Much of the estate used to build the halls has been bought from The Chilterns Shopping Centre.
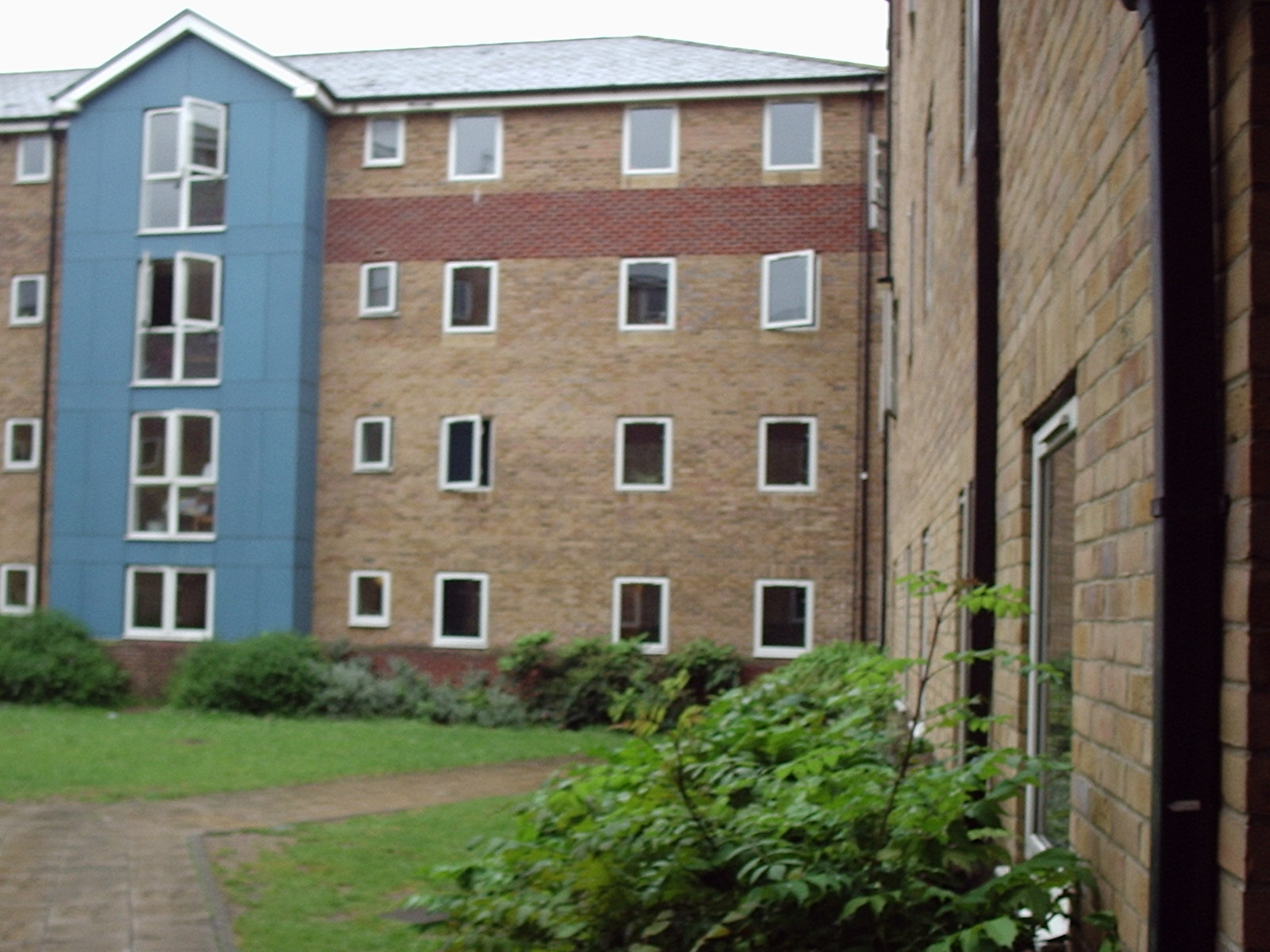
Brook Street Halls in 2003

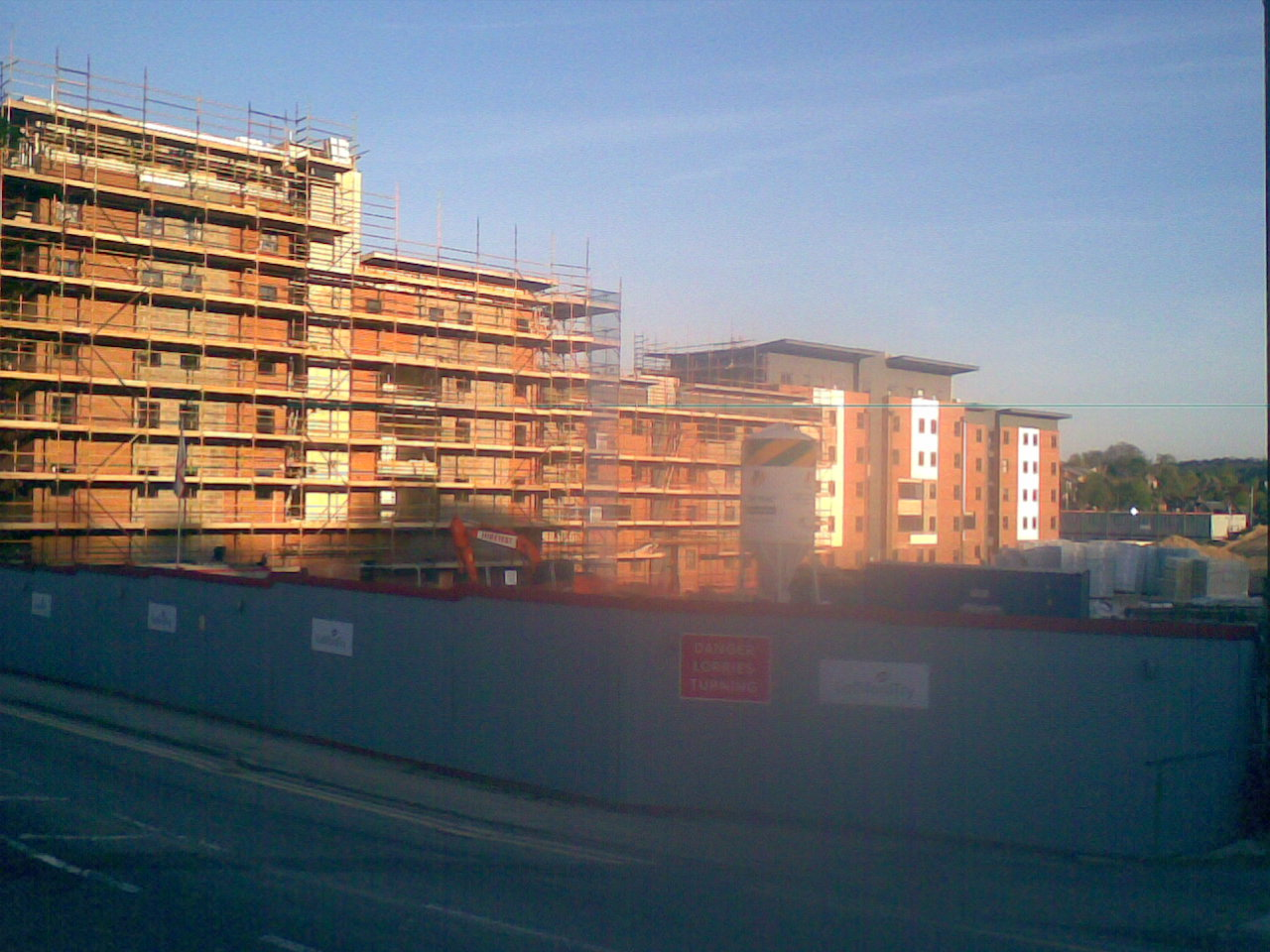
Hughenden Park Student Village under construction in 2009

== Academic profile ==
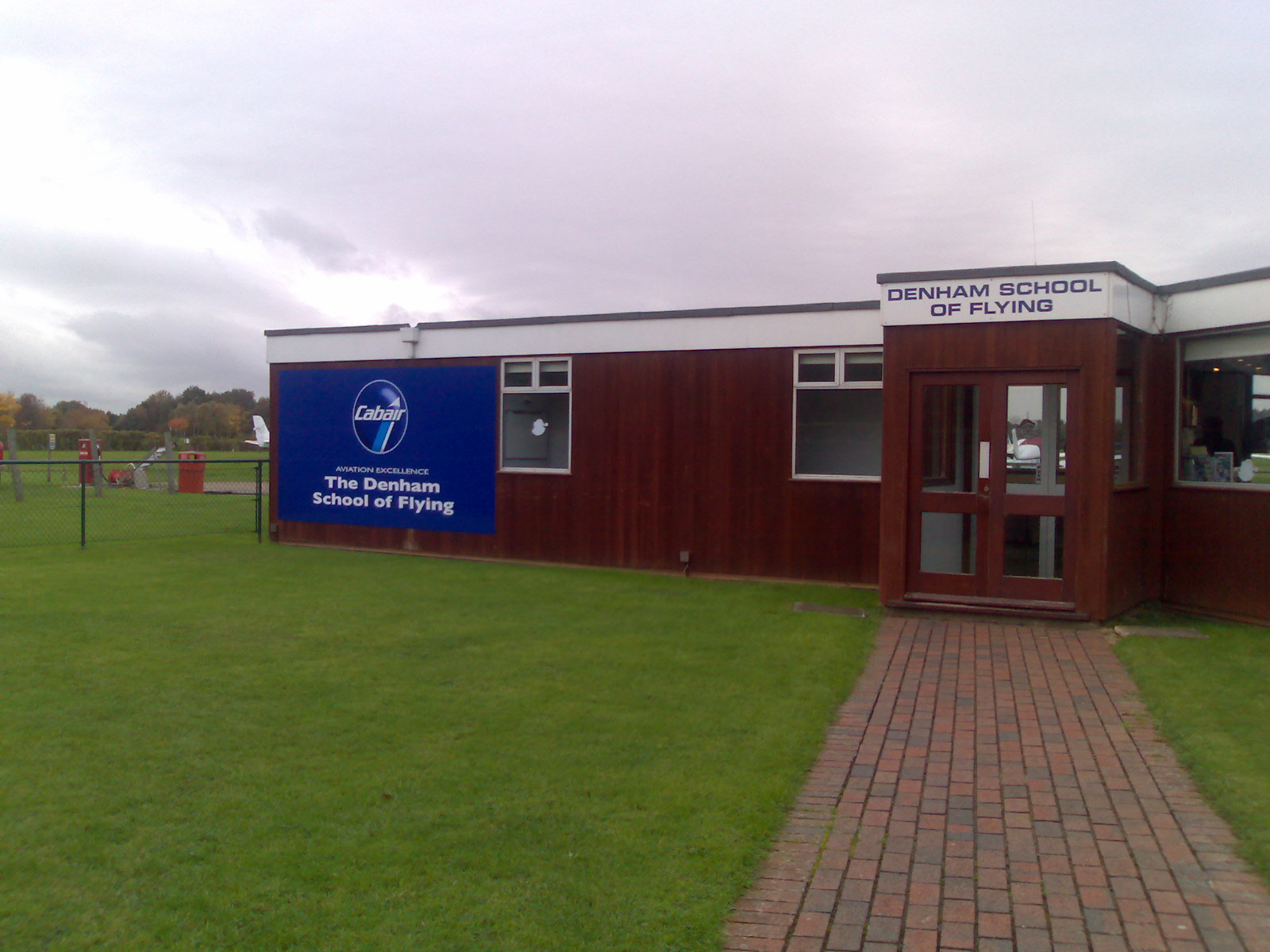
Cabair at Denham International

=== Reputation and rankings ===
Rankings
National rankings
- Complete (2027): 106
- Guardian (2027): 65
- Times / Sunday Times (2027): 122

In November 2013 it was ranked 12th in the UK by the Huffington Post in a list of creative universities. It was also included in a list of the top 14 creative universities in the UK by The Daily Telegraph in December 2013. Domestically, the university is ranked 70th out of 121 universities for 2023 (Guardian) and 39 out of 105 universities in England for teaching quality (Times / Sunday Times).

=== Research standing ===
For the most recent 2014 Research Excellence Framework (REF), the grading "internationally excellent" or "world leading" was for some submissions in the areas Allied Health Professions, Business and Management Studies, Sport and Exercise Sciences, Art and Design.

=== Specialist courses ===
The university runs several specialist courses.

The Air Transport with Commercial Pilot Training is a course offering students the opportunity to study for a professional pilot's licence whilst undertaking university studies in areas such as globalisation of the air transport industry and health safety and security for airlines and airports. Many former students have gone on to attain jobs as pilots in flying schools, charter companies and airlines around the world including Susi Air, Cathay Pacific, Qatar, BMI and Ryanair.

Although the Air Transport with Commercial Pilot Training course aims to provide guidance and support to students with the aim of becoming commercial pilots, many students are inspired by various modules of the course and pursue careers in other areas within the air transport industry.

In 2023, the university established a new Centre for Intelligence, Security and Resilience and expanded its offerings for students at the start of their careers as well as middle managers looking to apply analysis and information leadership to emerging challenges where intelligence, security and resilience coincide.

The university offers several other courses such as Music Management and Film and Television Production. The university also offers a course in Animation and Visual Effects, launched in September 2013.

Former logo until March 30, 2021.

Bucks New University, in partnership with the UK's largest non-metropolitan Police service Thames Valley Police, offers a Degree Apprenticeship for new Police entrants.

== Academics ==
Trevor Baylis was a frequent guest lecturer, and was present at a 2004 graduation ceremony and graduate degree show; he received an honorary degree from the university in 2007, and was present at the official opening of the Gateway building in 2010.

== Notable alumni ==
- Jay Blades – Furniture restorer and TV Presenter. First BNU Chancellor
- John Bolam – Artist
- Dave Brown – Actor and comedian
- Veronica Carlson – Model and actress
- Robin Day - Furniture designer
- Otto Decker – U.S.A. International Football player
- Lucian Ercolani – Furniture designer
- Noel Fielding – Actor and comedian
- Howard Jones - Musician
- Chris Joyce – Musician
- Fans of Kate – Indie Rock Band
- Brooke Kinsella - Actress and author
- Philip Koomen – Furniture designer
- Ricardo P. Lloyd – Actor and activist
- Naomi Riches - Paralympian medal winning rower
- Chloe Rogers - England International Hockey player
- Rebecca Stephens – Musician

== See also ==
- Armorial of UK universities
- List of universities in the UK
- Thames Valley Health Innovation and Education Cluster
