= Tom Williams & the Boat =

English folk-rock singer/songwriter from Hastings, England

Tom Williams
- Origin: Tunbridge Wells, Kent, England
- Genres: Anti-folk, indie rock
- Label: Wire Boat Recordings / Unlabel (UK/Europe) Moshi Moshi Records
- Members: Tom Williams; Anthony Vicary; Chris Stewart; Josh Taylor; David Trevillion

Tom Williams is an English folk-rock singer/songwriter from Hastings, England.

== History ==
Tom Williams & the Boat began when Tom Williams, fed up of playing solo, decided to form a band. The Boat came together as a result of friendships that had blossomed after playing in Tunbridge Wells music venue The Grey Lady. They have played many shows in Tunbridge Wells and still continue to play at the Grey Lady as well as The Forum.

They toured in 2010 with Stornoway and in 2011 released their debut album. The BBC compared them to Radiohead, Frank Turner, and the White Stripes. Comparisons have also been made with Nick Cave & the Bad Seeds.

The band have performed numerous BBC radio sessions for the likes of Huw Stephens, Huey Morgan, Cerys Matthews and Steve Lamacq as well as performing at Radio One's Big Weekend in 2008.

The band released their second album, Teenage Blood, on 16 April 2012 via their own Wire Boat Recordings and London label Moshi Moshi Records. Their third album, Easy Fantastic, came out in 2014 via Wire Boat Recordings/Moshi Moshi Records.

In 2017, Williams released his first album independent of The Boat via Caroline Records, entitled All Change, which was followed in March 2019 by What Did You Want to Be?.
