= Hot Club de Paris =

English rock band

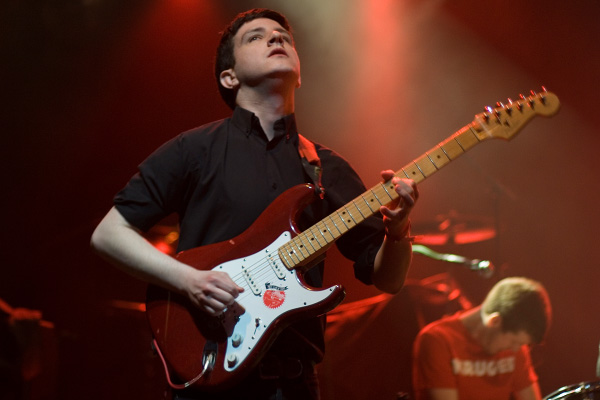

Background information
- Origin: Liverpool, Merseyside
- Genres: Indie rock, math rock, experimental rock, experimental
- Years active: 2004–2012
- Label: Moshi Moshi
- Past members: Alasdair Smith; Paul Rafferty; Matthew Cameron Smith
- Website: Official website

Hot Club de Paris were an English band from Liverpool. They were signed to Moshi Moshi Records and released their debut album Drop It 'Til It Pops in October 2006, and their second album Live at Dead Lake was released in June 2008. In 2010, the band released two EPs entitled With Days Like This As Cheap As Chewing Gum, Why Would Anyone Want To Work? and The Rise And Inevitable Fall of the High School Suicide Cluster Band. Hot Club released their final album, Free The Pterodactyl Three, in 2011, and has been inactive since 2012.

Following the disbanding of Hot Club de Paris, Paul Rafferty fronted Bad Meds and Doomshakalaka.

== Discography ==
=== Albums/EPs ===
Release date	Title
2006	Drop It 'til It Pops
2008	Live at Dead Lake
2010	With Days Like This as Cheap as Chewing Gum, Why Would Anyone Want to Work? (EP)
2010	The Rise And Inevitable Fall of the High School Suicide Cluster Band (EP)
2011	Free The Pterodactyl Three

=== Singles ===
- "Sometimesitsbetternottostickbitsofeachotherineachotherforeachother" (2006) UK No. 57
- "Everyeveryeverything" (2006) UK No. 67
- "Shipwreck" (2007) UK No. 38
- "Clockwork Toy / You Can Call Me Al" (2007) UK No. 88
- "Will You Still Be in Love With Me Next Year?" (2007)
- "Hey! Housebrick" (2008)UK No. 81
- "My Little Haunting" (2008)
