= James Yuill =

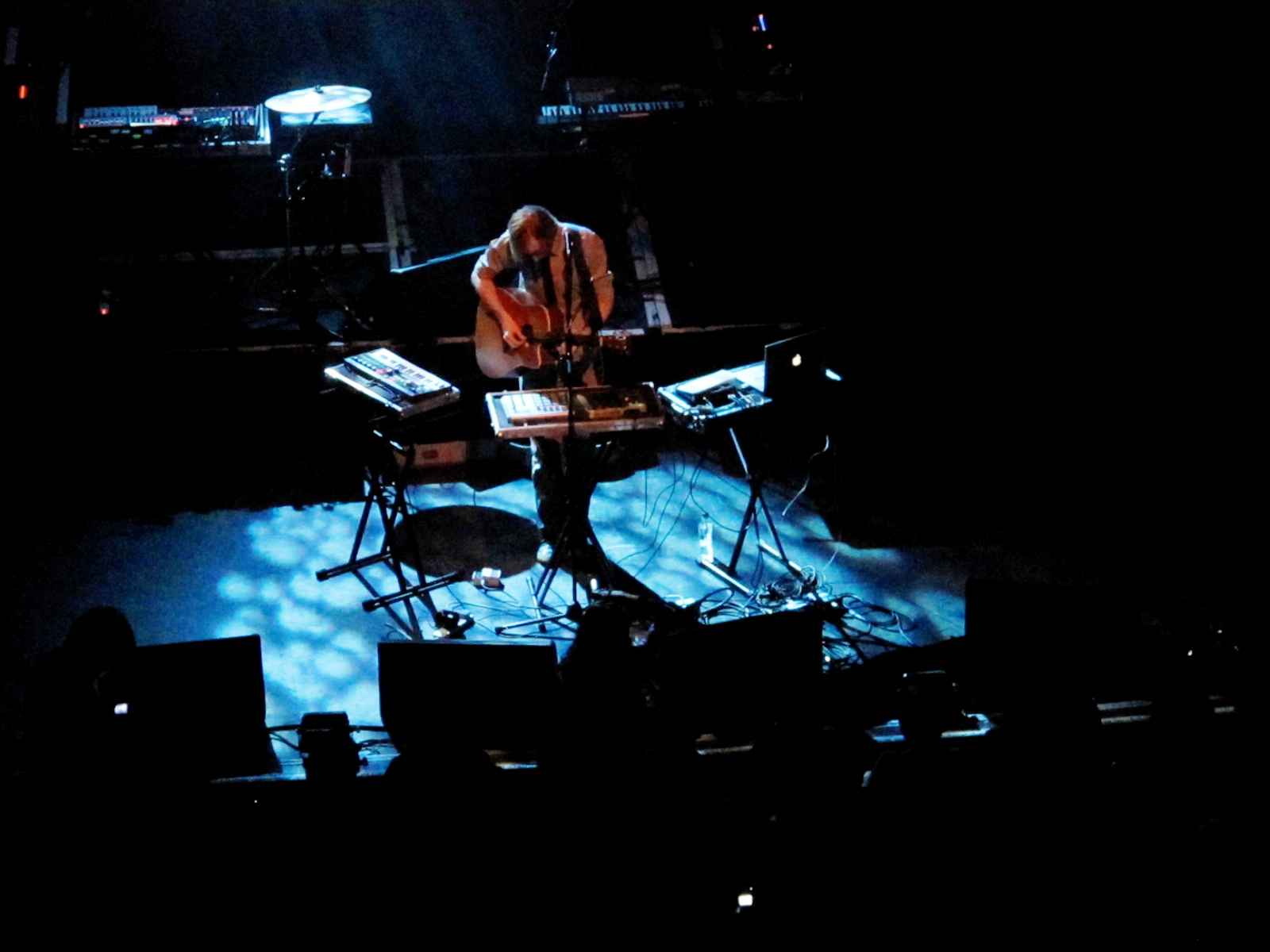
- James Yuill performing in 2009

Background information
- Born: James Yuill; 20 July 1981 (age 44)
- Origin: London, UK
- Genres: Acoustic, Electronica
- Instruments: Vocals, guitar, electronics
- Labels: The Happy Biscuit Club; Moshi Moshi; Nettwerk Music Group; Cooperative Music
- Member of: Hunger/Thirst
- Website: http://www.jamesyuill.com/

James Yuill (born 1981) is an English folktronica musician from London, signed to the Moshi Moshi record label.

== Education ==
Yuill was privately educated at Eastbourne College.

== Career ==
Yuill released his first album, The Vanilla Disc, on his own Happy Biscuit Club label in 2005. After releasing his second album, entitled Turning Down Water for Air, in February 2007, he was later signed by Moshi Moshi. Moshi Moshi re-issued the album in January 2009. Turning Down Water for Air was described by Clash as "a startling piece of work". He has been described as "a one-man band armed with a laptop, mixing decks and an acoustic guitar". His popularity grew internationally and he was signed by the Nettwerk Music Group in the United States in 2008.

Yuill also works as a remixer and has provided remixes for Tilly & the Wall, The Answering Machine, Au Revoir Simone, and David Holmes. He has also collaborated with Charlie Westropp under the pseudonym Hunger/Thirst.

In 2010, he produced a version of "Jingle Bells" for a Guinness commercial, using pint glasses containing varying levels of Guinness to create the tune.

In 2013, after a successful campaign on PledgeMusic, he released his fourth studio album called "These Spirits" on his Happy Biscuit Club label. Yuill's fifth album A Change In State was released in July 2017.

== Discography ==
=== Albums ===
- The Vanilla Disc (2005), Happy Biscuit Club
- Turning Down Water for Air (February 2007), Happy Biscuit Club
- Turning Down Water for Air (January 2009), Moshi Moshi
- Earth EP/Fire EP (2009), Moshi Moshi
- Movement In A Storm (2010), Moshi Moshi
- These Spirits (2013), Happy Biscuit Club
- A Change In State (2017), Happy Biscuit Club

=== Singles ===
- "This Sweet Love" (2008), Moshi Moshi
- "No Pins Allowed" (2008), Moshi Moshi
- "No Surprise" (2009), Moshi Moshi
- "Over The Hills" (2009), Moshi Moshi
- "On Your Own" (2010), Moshi Moshi
- "First In Line" (2010), Moshi Moshi
- "Crying For Hollywood" (2011), Moshi Moshi
- "Turn Yourself Around" (2013), The Happy Biscuit Club
