= Slow Club =

British indie pop band

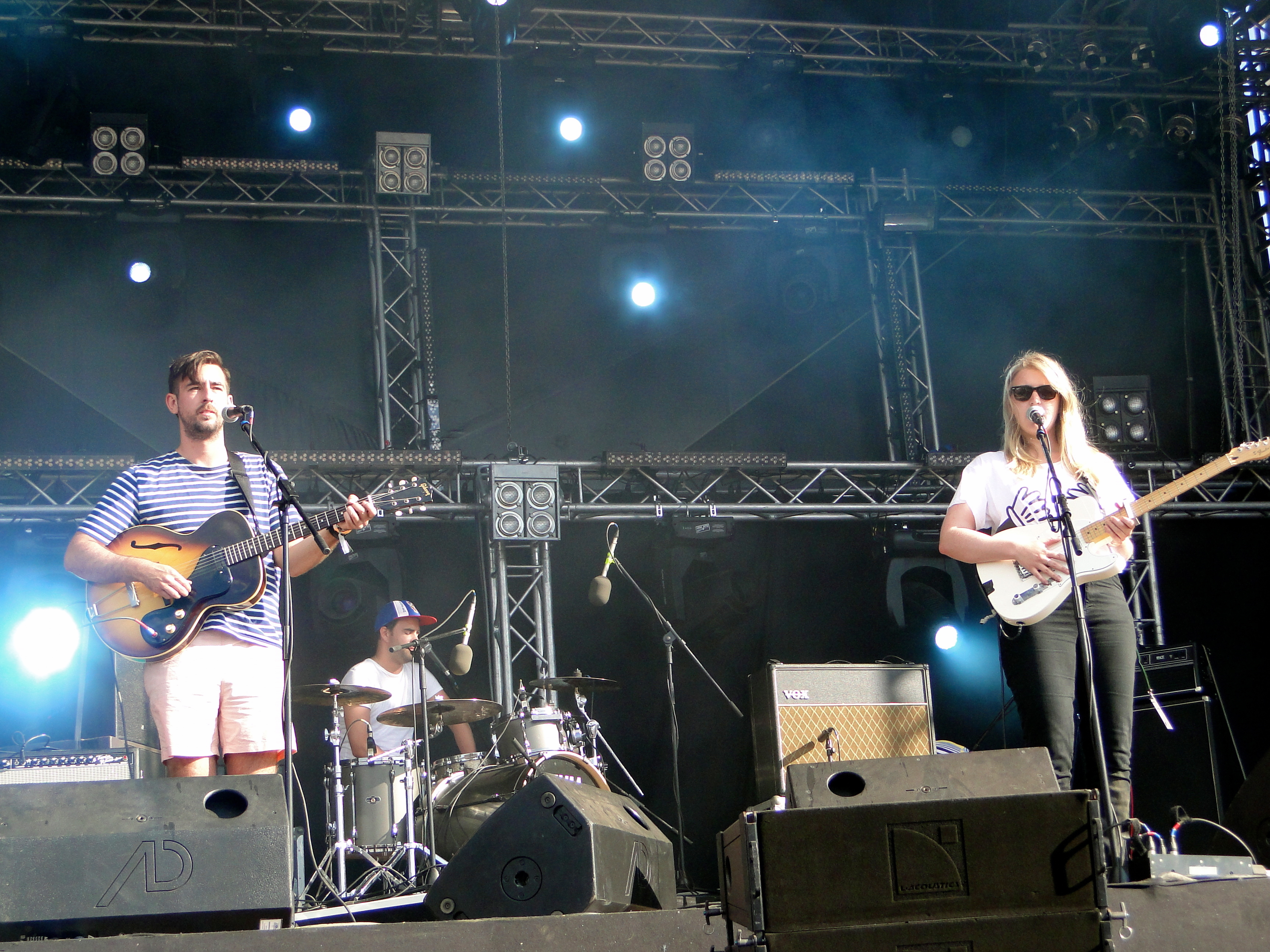
- Slow Club performing at Dockville festival, Hamburg, Germany, in 2012

Background information
- Origin: Sheffield, England
- Genres: Indie pop, folk rock
- Years active: 2006–2017
- Labels: Moshi Moshi Records, Caroline International, Wichita Recordings
- Past members: Charles Watson; Rebecca Lucy Taylor

Slow Club were an English duo formed in Sheffield in 2006. The band consisted of multi-instrumentalists Charles Watson and Rebecca Lucy Taylor, with Watson contributing piano, Taylor contributing drums, and both performing guitar and vocals. The band split in 2017 following an extensive tour to support their last album, with both members moving on to solo projects.

== History ==
Slow Club formed in 2006 following the dissolution of the indie-rock band The Lonely Hearts

The band released two 7" singles in 2007, "Because We're Dead" and "Me and You", on Moshi Moshi Records. On 1 September 2008, their first extended play, Let's Fall Back in Love, was released. A Christmas single, titled "Christmas TV", was released in December 2008.

Their debut album, Yeah So, was recorded by Mike Timm at Axis Studio in Sheffield and released in July 2009, followed by the release of their second EP Christmas, Thanks For Nothing in December 2009.

The band's second album, Paradise, produced by Luke Smith (Clor), was released on 12 September 2011. In 2012 "Beginners", the final single from the album, was released. The video features actor (and Slow Club fan) Daniel Radcliffe.

Slow Club have toured extensively around UK, Europe, US, Australia and Japan and played major UK festivals, including Glastonbury festival, Latitude festival and Green Man Festival. They have supported acts such as KT Tunstall, Florence and the Machine and Mumford and Sons. They often collaborated with other musicians, such as Sweet Baboo, during live shows.

In spring 2013 the band went back into the studio with Colin Elliot (who has worked with Richard Hawley) and started recording their third album. The album Complete Surrender was released on 14 July 2014. The band's touring line-up included long-time drummer Avvon Chambers and bassist Rob Jones. They were also occasionally joined by Fyfe Dangerfield.

The band released their fourth album One Day All of This Won't Matter Anymore, recorded in Richmond, Virginia, in 2016.

Following a tour between late 2016 and early 2017, the duo split up, with both working on solo projects. Taylor later discussed feeling unfulfilled by the joint project before the split. The tour was documented in the film Our Most Brilliant Friends directed by Piers Dennis.

As of July 2023, Charles Watson has released three solo albums: Now That I'm A River (2018), Yes (2022) and Yup (2023). Rebecca Lucy Taylor has released three studio albums under the stage name Self Esteem: Compliments Please, Prioritise Pleasure and A Complicated Woman.

== Critical reception ==
Slow Club were generally well received by critics. Metro described the band and its music, "Charming two-part harmonies, scruffy pop melodies and bitingly aware lyrics mark out this endearing two-piece." Robin Murray for Clash wrote "Charles Watson and Rebecca Lucy Taylor built up a truly unique catalogue, four albums of joyous, heart-rending, and frequently under-rated songwriting".

== Discography ==
=== Albums ===
Year	Title
2009	Yeah So: Released: 6 July 2009; Formats: CD, LP, digital download
2011	Paradise: Released: 12 September 2011; Formats: CD, LP, digital download; UK Albums Chart peak: No. 70 (18 September 2011)
2014	Complete Surrender: Released: 14 July 2014; Formats: CD, LP, digital download; UK Albums Chart peak: No. 51
2015	I Swam Out to Greet You: Released: 19 May 2015; Formats: LP, digital download
2016	One Day All of This Won't Matter Anymore: Released: 19 August 2016; Formats: CD, LP, digital download; UK Albums Chart peak: No.65

=== EPs ===
Year	Title
2008	Let's Fall Back in Love: Released: 1 September 2008; Formats: CD, digital download
2009	Christmas, Thanks for Nothing: Released: 14 December 2009; Formats: CD, LP, digital download

=== Singles ===
Year	Title	Album
2007	"Because We're Dead"	
2007	"Me and You"	
2008	"Christmas TV"	Christmas, Thanks for Nothing
2009
2009	"It Doesn't Have to Be Beautiful"	Yeah So
2009	"Trophy Room"	Yeah So
2010	"Giving Up on Love"	Yeah So
2011
2011	"Two Cousins"	Paradise
2011	"Where I'm Waking"	Paradise
2011	"If We're Still Alive"	Paradise
2012	"The Dog"	Paradise
2012	"Beginners"	Paradise
2014	"Complete Surrender"	Complete Surrender
2014	"Suffering You, Suffering Me"	Complete Surrender
2014	"Everything Is New"	Complete Surrender
2016	"In Waves"	One Day All of This Won't Matter Anymore
2016	"Ancient Rolling Sea"	One Day All of This Won't Matter Anymore
