= New Adventures (British band) =

British indie rock band

- Origin: London, England
- Genres: Indie rock, alternative rock
- Years active: 2006–present
- Label: Faded Grandeur
- Members: Jez Dixon; Steve Hurdle; Helen Fisher; Raphael Knapp; Nick Eburah
- Website: http://www.newadventures.net

New Adventures are an indie rock band originating from London. Their sound is compared often to the likes of Arcade Fire, Radiohead and Keane. The band consists of Jez Dixon (lead vocals), Steve Hurdle (guitar, backing vocals), Raph Knapp (bass guitar, backing vocals), Helen Fisher (keyboards, backing vocals) and Nick Eburah (drums and percussion).

Most of the band's members were previously in the band Fans of Kate. The band's debut single "How I Got My Devil Back (part one)" was described by Drowned in Sound as "soaring indie-rock schlock at its most overblown and 'epic'", while The Skinny commented on the similarity to Snow Patrol, calling the single "an outrageously blatant bit of bandwagon jumping". The follow-up, "In Our Hands", was received more positively, with one reviewer describing it as "a big, urgent rock song that feels custom-made to win over the masses on national radio", and another as "a euphoric anthem in waiting".

== Discography ==
=== EPs ===
- Accidents (2009)

=== Singles ===
- "How I Got My Devil Back (part one)" (2008), Faded Grandeur
- "In Our Hands"

=== Albums ===
- Repeat to Fade (2010)
