= Oxfordshire Economic Partnership =

The Oxfordshire Economic Partnership (OEP) is a company limited by guarantee formed in June 2003 by a number of Oxfordshire business people including Sir Martin Wood, the founder of Oxford Instruments, Dr John McKeown, the Chief Executive of UKAEA together with senior public sector executives to influence and develop strategies for enterprise and economic development in Oxfordshire, to promote competitiveness of the economy in Oxfordshire, to promote enterprise and economic growth in Oxfordshire, to promote education and training of and the development of skills amongst the existing and future work force in Oxfordshire, to research and promote the sustenance and enhancement of the environment in Oxfordshire and generally to promote in any manner the County of Oxfordshire for the benefit of its employers, employees and communities.

The following organisations are members of OEP: The OEP Membership meets quarterly and includes the following organisations:

- Meeson Williams Ltd.
- InTouch Marketing Ltd.
- BBK Media Ltd.
- Bicester & District Chamber of Commerce
- Unipart Group of Companies Ltd.
- JJ Marketing Ltd.
- Shaw Gibbs LLP
- Fallowfields Country House Hotel Ltd.
- LeaderShape Ltd.
- Cherwell District Council
- The Mid-Counties Co-operative Limited
- South Oxfordshire District Council
- Banbury & District Chamber of Commerce
- West Oxfordshire District Council
- The University of Oxford
- Vale of White Horse District Council
- Cochranes of Oxford Ltd
- Oxfordshire County Council
- Oxford Brookes University
- Oxford City Council
- Science Oxford
- UKAEA
- Thames Valley Chamber of Commerce & Industry
- Oxford Radcliffe Hospitals NHS Trust

The partnership works by identifying priority areas for intervention and improvement and bringing together the relevant partners to define and deliver that intervention, seeking funding from a range of sources as appropriate.

In October 2005, the OEP collaborated with Oxfordshire County and private sector broadband providers to launch the Oxfordshire Broadband Partnership, established to promote the use of broadband internet in Oxfordshire.

== See also ==
- Thames Valley Health Innovation and Education Cluster
