= Moshi Moshi Records =

English record label

- Founded: October 1998
- Genre: Various
- Country of origin: England
- Official website: moshimoshimusic.bandcamp.com

Moshi Moshi Records is an independent London-based record label founded in 1998 by Adrian Pike, Michael McClatchey and Stephen Bass. The label has released music by bands including Lykke Li, Fimber Bravo, Bloc Party, Hot Chip, Late of the Pier, Hot Club De Paris, Kate Nash, Florence and the Machine, Architecture in Helsinki, the Wave Pictures, Disclosure, Sweet Baboo, Tilly and the Wall, Blue Foundation, Slow Club, Happyness, and Au Revoir Simone. Mates Of State's 2008 record Re-Arrange Us was Moshi Moshi's 50th release. Adrian Pike left the set up within a couple of years leaving McClatchey and Bass to carry on the business. These days it also includes a Management Company who manage Metronomy, Teleman, Slow Club and Sweet Baboo among others and has publishing interests in conjunction with Tummy Touch Music, Eagle-I Music and Blue Mountain Music.

Moshi Moshi also has a Singles Club that has been responsible for the release of records by Florence And The Machine, thecocknbullkid, Fanfarlo, Casiokids, Lykke Li and Friendly Fires amongst others.

It is named after the Japanese telephone greeting "moshi moshi", which translates to hello.

== Live events ==
In 2013 Moshi Moshi hosted a monthly live event at the Servant Jazz Quarters on Bradbury Street in London's Dalston. It has also hosted nights at Hoxton Bar & Kitchen, the Buffalo Bar and the Garage in London. Bands who have previously played include Florence and the Machine, The XX, Lykke Li, Fleet Foxes, The Young Knives, Casiokids, James Yuill, Fimber Bravo, Mariam the Believer, Friendly Fires, and Best Fwends.

Moshi Moshi has also hosted a stage at Iceland Airwaves festival for the last 6 years and has taken bands like Fuck Buttons, Factory Floor, the Drums, Florence and the Machine, Friendly Fires, the Dirty Projectors, Metronomy, Au Revoir Simone, Hot Chip, Architecture in Helsinki, Totally Enormous Extinct Dinosaurs, Kwes and more over to Reykjavik

Stages are also regularly held at the Great Escape Festival in Brighton UK, SWN festival in Cardiff UK and occasionally SXSW.

== Compilation album ==
In 2008 the label released its first compilation album, named Moshi Moshi Singles Compilation. It featured a number of artists who had released material via the label. Among the artists included were Kate Nash, Late of the Pier and Friendly Fires. A second compilation was released in April 2010, and featured a variety of singles from bands who had signed to the label since the first release including Florence and the Machine.

== Artists ==
- Albertine Sarges
- Alexis Taylor
- Alice Costelloe
- Alterkicks
- Anna Meredith
- Architecture in Helsinki
- Au Revoir Simone
- Best Fwends
- Bloc Party
- Blue Foundation
- Breakbot
- Casiokids
- Casual Sex
- Chinese American Bear
- Clock Opera
- Cerebral Ballzy (with Williams Street Records)
- Dananananaykroyd
- Dels
- Disclosure
- Diskjokke
- Dntel
- The Drums
- Elle S'appelle
- Egyptian Hip Hop
- Fanfarlo
- Fainting by Numbers
- Fans of Kate
- Fimber Bravo
- Florence and the Machine
- Foreign Born
- Friendly Fires
- Fulu Miziki
- Girl Ray
- The Grates
- Happyness
- Hercules and Love Affair
- Hot Chip
- Hot Club de Paris
- Idiot Glee
- Ingo Star Cruiser
- J Xaverre
- James Yuill
- JD
- Junkboy
- Kate Nash
- Late of the Pier
- Lo-Fi-Fnk
- Lykke Li
- The Mae Shi
- Mates of State
- Matt and Kim
- Matt Harding
- Meatraffle
- Metronomy
- Mike Lindsay
- Moscoman
- Nadeem Din Gabisi
- New Rhodes
- Pacific!
- Pedro v Kathryn Williams
- The Rakes
- Rat:att:agg
- The Rhythm Method
- Roland Shanks
- Roxy Girls
- Slow Club
- Soccer 96
- Sparkling
- Still Flyin'
- Sukpatch
- Summer Camp
- Sweet Baboo
- Team Water Polo
- TEETH
- Teleman
- Tom Vek
- Tom Williams & The Boat
- thecocknbullkid
- The Rhythm Method
- The Very Best
- Tilly and the Wall
- Trophy Wife
- Unsound
- The Wave Pictures
- WooWoos
- Yeti
- Zan Lyons

== See also ==
- List of record labels
- A side project of the Disco Biscuits
- Moshi moshi at Wiktionary
