= Forever Now (Switchfoot album) =

Studio album by Switchfoot
- Released: June 26, 2026
- Studio: Phantom Studios (Nashville, Tennessee)
- Genres: Rock; alternative
- Length: 45:55
- Labels: By Design; BMG
- Producers: Mike Elizondo; Switchfoot

Switchfoot chronology
The Beautiful Letdown (Our Version) (2023)	Forever Now (2026)

Singles from Forever Now
- 1. "Wake Up, Mr. Crow" Released: March 27, 2026; 2. "Absolution" Released: June 2, 2026; 3. "Beautiful Life" Released: September 14, 2026

Forever Now (styled Forever Now! on the cover) is the fourteenth studio album by the American rock band Switchfoot. The album was released on June 26, 2026, via By Design Music in partnership with BMG Rights Management. It is the band's first album since Vice Verses to be produced by Mike Elizondo, as well as their first since Fading West to feature instrumental contributions from him. The album is a concept album revolving around the emotional events of a person's final day on Earth.

Forever Now was supported with the release of three singles, including "Wake Up, Mr. Crow" on March 27, 2026, "Absolution" on June 2, 2026, and "Beautiful Life" on September 14, 2026. "Absolution" peaked at number 26 on the Billboard Alternative Airplay chart, while "Beautiful Life" peaked at number 39 on the Christian Airplay chart. The album itself debuted at number 25 on the Billboard Top Album Sales chart in the United States, while in the United Kingdom charting at number 62 on the OCC's Official Album Downloads chart.

== Release and promotion ==
Forever Now was first announced in March 2026, during a performance at South by Southwest Festival. Alongside the announcement of the album, it was also announced that "Wake Up, Mr. Crow" would be released as the album's lead single on March 27, 2026; the track was made available for pre-order. Upon release, it was promoted with the release of a music video, which was uploaded to YouTube. With the release of "Wake Up, Mr. Crow", the release date for Forever Now was announced, and the album was made available for pre-order. It was with the announcement that a promotional trailer was released. On May 15, 2026, the track "Absolution" was released as a promotional single, before being released to alternative radio on June 2 as the second single from Forever Now. On June 3, 2026, the album's tracklist was revealed. In promotion of the album's release, Switchfoot headlined on the Forever Now Tour for late 2026 to early 2027, which would visit 47 venues across the United States and Europe and feature Anberlin. In September 2026, "Beautiful Life" was released to Christian radio as the album's third and final single.

== Theme and concept ==
A concept album, Forever Now is themed around the "emotional roller coaster of a person's final day on Earth". Jon Foreman, the group's frontman, explained that the album's concept asks the question, "If you found out that today was your last day, how would you live it? What would matter most?" Switchfoot spoke on the background behind the album, saying:

The goal for us was to look inward and find the songs that are uniquely ours to sing. Instead of chasing after what is profitable or lucrative, we were looking for the moments that made us fall in love with rock and roll to begin with. That was what we wanted to represent with this record. ["Wake Up, Mr. Crow"] is just the beginning of what is to come. As artists, we're always looking to grow and expand our sound. Underneath it all, we are forever kids, just playing with music as this amazing toy that has endless possibilities. In the pursuit of growth, it can look like running from yourself and your sound. But with this album, we were very intentional about owning who we truly are. We were very intentional not to run from what is uniquely ours.

Bassist Tim Foreman has considered the album to be "incredibly meaningful [...] increasingly relevant in the strange, strange times we live in", while frontman Jon Foreman wrote the albums tracks with inspiration from "watching people he loved face their final days and realizing those moments only became clear in hindsight". The concept was inspired by the works of authors Leo Tolstoy and Fyodor Dostoevsky. The album's title, Forever Now, is a reference to a lyric from the song "Where I Belong" on the band's 2011 release Vice Verses.

== Development ==
Switchfoot signed with By Design Music, a new label and music publisher, in 2025. The deal included a partnership with BMG.

Forever Now is Switchfoot's first non-holiday studio album release in five years, having released a Christmas album and re-rerecording of The Beautiful Letdown in the interim. The group wrote the album's tracks during "an intense and highly emotional period of songwriting, musical discovery and keen cultural observation". The album was produced by Elizondo, who produced the band's 2009 album Hello Hurricane, which resulted in a sound similar to Hello Huricane. It was recorded at Elizondo's Phantom Studios in Nashville, Tennessee.

== Style ==
Forever Now contains what the band has described as a "big hooks, big guitars and big themes" approach, containing lyrics written with "curiosity, vulnerability and a distinctly human perspective". It features a return to Switchfoot's original guitar-driven sound following a period of implementing more experimental elements. With a "guitar-centric" sound and "crunchy overdrive", the album is more rock-leaning than previous releases have been. It is composed generally of "upbeat, guitar-driven songs" that contain "steady energy". U2, Coldplay, and Radiohead have been named as major influences to the style found in Forever Now.

=== Songs and themes ===
Forever Now begins with "Wake Up, Mr. Crow", an "alarm clock of a song" which "looks at societal pressure and how we tend to hide behind the idea 'I'm Ok'".The song is followed by tracks "Absolution" and "Beautiful Life", which explore the ideas of searching for "meaning in the middle of difficult times"; the former of which has often been considered one of the album's strongest attempts, compelled by its "infectious melody" and "profound spiritual questions". The album's fourth track, "Shake the Dust", contains ""energetic momentum", an "explosive" sound, and "some of the heaviest riffs of [Switchfoot's] career". A similar sound is found in the subsequent "Same Blood" and "Ride or Die". Track six, "YFWYA" – an initialism for "you forgot who you are" – is centered around "one of the album's strongest theological statements": the theme of "calling believers back to their identity in the image of God". The blues rock "Two Twins" tells the story of "unborn siblings discussing what lies beyond birth" in a "philosophical" and "imaginitive" way which "[shows] off Switchfoot's songwriting in all of its hilarity and insight". "Breaking Up Again", an interlude, offers a much slower, more acoustic style, before the album closes with "The Butterfly Effect", which "[revisits] musical themes introduced in the opener" in an attempt to "[tie] the record together beautifully".

== Reception ==
Professional ratings
Review scores
Source	Rating
Alt Revue	9/10
Classic Rock	2.5/5 stars
Jesus Freak Hideout	5/5 stars 4/5 stars 4.5/5 stars
Jubilee Cast	4.5/5 stars
Louder Than the Music	5/5 stars
Metalhead Zone	3.5/5 stars
Sputnikmusic	3.8/5 stars
Today's Christian Entertainment	3/5 stars

=== Critical ===
Writing for Jesus Freak Hideout, Noah Schmidt rated Forever Now 5-out-of-5 stars, acclaiming it as "one of the strongest records of their career". Schmidt praised the record as "breath of fresh air for those craving more dedicated rock", writing that some album tracks "could be discussed alongside the band's biggest rock hits to date". He also noted that it "brings plenty of lyrical highpoints as well", and conclusively labelled it as "without question, the hardest rocking record they have ever done". Rating the album 9/10, Alt Revue's Emily Lehr similarly praised Forever Now's "creative longevity", making note of its "high energy and motivated lyrics", and describing the album as "heavy with musings about life, death, and meaning". Jono Davies of Louder Than the Music rated it 5-out-of-5, saying "This isn't an album that reveals everything on the first listen. It's one that deserves your time, gradually unfolding with each play. Every listen uncovers something new, making it a genuine grower. Long-time Switchfoot fans will undoubtedly find plenty to love here, while there's every chance a new generation of listeners will discover why this remarkable band continues to inspire after all these years."

=== Commercial ===
In the United Kingdom, "Wake Up, Mr. Crow", the album's lead single, debuted at number 2 on the Cross Rhythms Christian Airplay chart. In the United States, "Absolution" reached number 26 on the Billboard Alternative Airplay chart, and "Beautiful Life" reached number 39 on the Christian Airplay chart. The album itself debuted at number 62 on the Official Charts Company's UK Album Downloads chart, while in the United States reached number 25 on the Billboard Top Album Sales chart and number 4 on the Top Christian Albums chart.

== Track listing ==
Forever Now track listing
No.	Title	Writer(s)	Length
1.	"Wake Up, Mr. Crow"	J. Foreman, T. Foreman	4:05
2.	"Absolution"	J. Foreman, T. Foreman	4:05
3.	"Beautiful Life"	J. Foreman, T. Foreman	3:54
4.	"Shake the Dust"	J. Foreman, T. Foreman, Mike Elizondo	3:20
5.	"Natural Causes"	J. Foreman	4:23
6.	"YFWYA"	J. Foreman	3:16
7.	"Same Blood"	J. Foreman	3:16
8.	"Ride or Die"	J. Foreman, T. Foreman	3:04
9.	"Darkness"	J. Foreman	4:08
10.	"Broken Wings"	J. Foreman, T. Foreman	4:04
11.	"Two Twins"	J. Foreman	3:36
12.	"Breaking Up Again"	J. Foreman	1:30
13.	"The Butterfly Effect"	J. Foreman, T. Foreman	3:14
Total length:			45:55

== Personnel ==
Credits are adapted from Tidal.

=== Switchfoot ===
- Chad Butler – drums, vocals, production
- Jerome Fontamillas – keyboards, vocals, production
- Jon Foreman – guitar, vocals, production
- Tim Foreman – bass, vocals, production
- Boaz Roberts – guitar, vocals, production

=== Additional contributors ===
- Mike Elizondo – production (all tracks), keyboards (track 9)
- Tanner Sparks – mixing, engineering (all tracks); guitar (8, 10)
- Joe Causey – mastering
- Justin Francis – engineering (1, 3, 4, 7, 9, 13)
- Alex Wilder – engineering assistance (1, 3, 4, 7, 9, 13)
- Erica Block – engineering assistance (1, 3, 4, 7, 9, 13)
- Daisy Foreman – additional vocals (13)
- Matt Thiessen – additional vocals (13)

== Charts ==
Chart performance for Forever Now
Chart (2026)	Peak position
UK Album Downloads (Official Charts)	62
US Top Album Sales (Billboard)	25
US Top Christian Albums (Billboard)	4

== Release history ==
Release history and formats for Forever Now
Region	Date	Format(s)	Label(s)
Various	June 26, 2026	CD; LP; digital download; streaming	By Design Music; BMG
