= Saints (Destroy the Runner album) =

Studio album by Destroy the Runner
- Released: September 12, 2006
- Genre: Melodic metalcore
- Length: 41:01
- Label: Solid State Records
- Producers: Destroy the Runner; Steve Russell

Destroy the Runner chronology
Saints (2006)	I, Lucifer (2008)

Singles from Saints
- 1. "My Darkness" Released: August 18, 2006; 2. "Columbia" Released: August 21, 2006; 3. "Thoughts In Reverse" Released: August 28, 2006; 4. "Pallbearer" Released: September 11, 2006

Saints is the debut studio album from American metalcore band Destroy the Runner. The album was released through Solid State Records on September 12, 2006. It is the only album to feature bassist Jeremiah Crespo.

== Background ==
Destroy the Runner formed under the name "Die Like Me" in 2004 and self-released an EP titled "Welcome To Eternity." The band was signed by Solid State Records in June 2006 and changed its name.

The band made the track "My Darkness" available as a single via its MySpace profile on August 18, 2006. Three days later, the band posted the song "Columbia." On August 28, Tooth & Nail / Solid State made the track "Thoughts in Reverse" available for streaming on the band's MySpace as part of the label's "New Music Week." The song "Pallbearer" was posted to purevolume.com on September 11, 2006.

In a 2006 interview with HM Magazine, Setter explained the track "Pallbearer" was of significant meaning to him, saying it's a song "about losing someone in your life that is very close to you. I've lost friends and relatives through the years and when you get a phone call or someone gives you the news it seems unreal. Things like that are really tough, and sometimes raise a lot of questions about God's will. It's at times like when we really just need to trust." In the same interview, Setter (and Kohlbry) said their favorite part of recording Saints was "the burritos." Both were also complimentary of producer Steve Russell as well, who they called a "guru" and said helped them "realize our vision for this record."

On the album's themes, vocalist Kyle Setter said “So many metal bands are all about death, destruction and depression, and it might seem like there is no hope, but we’re saying that there is” adding “I always write about my personal convictions and experiences.”

On the meaning behind the album's title, Setter said:

“People think they are too good to help others ... People go through so much in life to get where they are, and it’s worth the trials and the struggles. It’s like all the thing saints go thru to get canonized. When I wrote most of my lyrics, I talked about struggles, and how I’ve grown as a person, through experiencing losses of friends and personal relationships. In this day and age, people look down on you, like they’ve never gone through these things, but we all have and there’s no shame in that.”

A music video was recorded for the title track, “Saints.” The video was produced by Danny Yourd and directed by Steve Hoover of Endeavor Media. On Jan 22, 2007, the band made a live video of the track "My Darkness" available via punkrockvids.com. The video was shot at "The Underground" in Roseville, California.

Following the album's release, Destroy the Runner joined up with The Chariot, August Burns Red, Twelve Gauge Valentine, and Inhale/Exhale as part of the "Youngbloods II" tour.

Vocalist Setter and bassist Crespo would depart the band at the end of 2006. They were replaced by members of the band Chapter 14: vocalist Chad Ackerman (a friend of Kohlbry), and bassist Tanner Sparks. Ackerman would go on to provide primary vocals for the band on their sophomore album I, Lucifer.

In 2009 the band announced that they would be releasing the track "Sinners." Originally a B-side for the album Saints titled "12 Pieces," it was the only track not included on the original release. The band decided to release a remixed version of the track with new vocals and lyrics by then-vocalist Chad Ackerman. "Sinners" was posted to the band's MySpace in January 2010.

== Critical reception ==
Professional ratings
Review scores
Source	Rating
Allmusic	3/5 stars
Alternative Press	2.5/5 stars
Jesus Freak Hideout	3/5 stars
PunkNews.org	2/5 stars

Indie Vision Music gave a positive review to the album, remarking positively on the variation from hard core metal "Aggressive, pop-influenced metal," though noting that metalcore traditionalists would "dismiss the album as too weak."

AllMusic described the album as melodic metal akin to Underoath's 2004 album They're Only Chasing Safety. AllMusic wrote that, in the same manner as Underoath, "Destroy the Runner approach their personal lyrics from a Christian-minded point of view, yet vaguely enough that most listeners will be none the wiser regarding their religious affiliation unless they're familiar with the band's record label."

Alternative Press reviewer Jennifer Sica gave the album 2.5 out of 5 stars, praising the band's positive lyrics but finding it a formulaic metalcore release, stating that "while the album’s 'been there, done that' tone doesn’t vary from a pattern of aggressive vocals, kick drum-induced breakdowns and melodious choruses for scream- or sing-along-ability, it’s at least invariably consistent." Jesus Freak Hideout reviewer Sean Lex also noted the album didn't offer much different than what was being released by established metalcore bands like Unearth or Haste The Day, but appreciated the album's positive message.PunkNews.org's Jordan Rogowski found the band's sound too similar to Darkest Hour, going so far as to call the band “Diet Darkest Hour,” but praised the tracks "There Can Be No Hesitation" and "Separate." While criticizing the album's clean vocals, Rogowski felt the band was at their best when they were exploring the metal-side of their music, praising the band's "quick and crushing riffs, solid vocals, and a good overall understanding of rhythm and how to use it."

== Track listing ==
No.	Title	Length
1.	"Dialogue"	1:17
2.	"My Darkness"	4:03
3.	"Columbia"	4:29
4.	"Saints"	3:59
5.	"Thoughts in Reverse"	2:35
6.	"The Aleph"	3:58
7.	"From the Red" (feat. Cove Reber)	4:35
8.	"Without Sight"	2:55
9.	"Separate"	3:11
10.	"Sound of Reason"	3:24
11.	"There Can Be No Hesitation"	3:35
12.	"Pallbearer"	4:15
13.	"Resolution"	1:25

== Personnel ==
Production and performance credits are adapted from the album liner notes.

Destroy the Runner

- Kyle Setter – lead vocals
- Nick “Maldy" Maldonado – lead guitar
- Duane Reed – rhythm guitar, vocals
- Jeremiah Crespo – bass guitar
- Marc Kohlbry – drums

Guest personnel

- Cove Reber (of Saosin) – backing vocals

Production

- Mike Sarkisian – additional guitar production
- Tim Lambesis – additional production
- Daniel Castleman – mixing
- Troy Glessner – mastering
- Kevin Puig – drum engineering (excluding tracks 4 & 5)
- Steve Russell – drum engineering (tracks 4 & 5)
- Chad Johson – A&R
- Ian J. Friedman Esq. – legal representation
- Tim Lambesis & Jason Rudolph – management
- Asterisk Studio – art direction & design
- Peter Dawson – photography
