= I, Lucifer (Destroy the Runner album) =

Studio album by Destroy the Runner
- Released: April 15, 2008
- Recorded: Late 2007
- Genres: Christian metal, melodic metalcore
- Length: 38:50
- Label: Solid State
- Producer: Brian McTernan

Destroy the Runner chronology
Saints (2006)	I, Lucifer (2008)	Void (2016)

Singles from I, Lucifer
- 1. "Mr. and Mrs. Cuckoldom" Released: February 20, 2008; 2. "Crumbs For The Murder" Released: March 11, 2008; 3. "Isabella's" Released: April 14, 2008

Professional ratings
Review scores
Source	Rating
AbsolutePunk.net	(83%)
AllMusic	3.5/5 stars
Jesus Freak Hideout	2/5 stars
Indie Vision Music	8.5/10 stars

I, Lucifer is the second studio album from metalcore band Destroy the Runner. It was released on April 15, 2008. The album charted in the U.S. on the Billboard magazine Top Christian Albums chart at No. 27 and on the Top Heatseekers chart at No. 25.

It is the first Destroy the Runner album to feature Chad Ackerman as a lead vocalist, and the first to feature Tanner Sparks on Bass guitar. It is also the band's last studio album released prior to their hiatus in 2010.

I, Lucifer shows the band drifting away from their metalcore sound established in their debut, Saints, as it features less screaming and more singing.

== Background ==
Both Sparks and Ackerman, then of Chapter 14, would join Destroy the Runner in 2007. Ackerman, a friend of drummer Marc Kohlbury would join at Kohlbury's request following the departure of Kyle Setter.

The band released three tracks as singles to promote the album: "Mr. and Mrs. Cuckoldom," "Crumbs For The Murder," and "Isabella's," on February 20, March 11, and April 14 2008 respectively.

A music video for the song "Isabella's" was released on January 14, 2009.

To promote the album the band toured with War of Ages, Inhale Exhale, Hands, and Hope for the Dying on the "Arise And Conquer Tour" in 2009. They also toured with Blind Witness and I Am Abomination.

The album was recorded with Brian McTernan at Salad Days Studio.

== Critical reception ==
The record takes on a far more progressive sound from the band's previous effort. When interviewed, Ackerman noted that after his time with scream-heavy As I Lay Dying he wanted to do an album more singing-focused, and added he felt that "I, Lucifer" turned out to be about 80% singing, 20% screaming.

The band's new direction was well received by critics. AllMusic's Greg Prato rated the album favorably, praising the "new look" band for embracing "tricky prog music" and "good old-fashioned clean singing" Indie Vision Music praised the band's change in direction as well, commending Ackerman's vocal melodies and calling the album "much more powerful, emotional, and memorable record than the majority of the releases of their counterparts in the scene."

== Track listing ==
No.	Title	Length
1.	"Crumbs for the Murder"	3:32
2.	"Isabella’s"	3:44
3.	"Mr. and Mrs. Cuckoldom"	3:52
4.	"A Bag of Marbles"	3:00
5.	"I, Lucifer"	3:42
6.	"It’s Always Cold in Paris"	2:36
7.	"A Pathetic Psalm"	3:59
8.	"Luxuria"	3:20
9.	"On Falling Leaf"	3:45
10.	"A Novel of War"	2:48
11.	"A Mountain So Big, A Question So Small"	4:32

== Credits ==
Adapted from CD liner notes

Destroy the Runner

- Chad Ackerman – lead vocals
- Nick “Maldy" Maldonado – lead guitar
- Duane Reed – rhythm guitar, vocals
- Tanner Sparks – bass guitar
- Marc Kohlbry – drums

Additional personnel

- Brian McTernan – production, engineering, mixing
- Paul Leavitt – Pro Tools engineering
- Mike Schleibaum – engineering assistance
- George Marino – mastering
- Chad Johnson – A&R
- Ian J. Friedman Esq. – legal
- Tim Lambesis & Jason Rudolph – management
- Jerad Knudson – photography
- Jordan Butcher – art direction & design
