= An Ocean Between Us =

Studio album by As I Lay Dying
- Released: August 21, 2007
- Recorded: March 2007
- Studios: Lambesis Studio, San Marcos, California
- Genre: Melodic metalcore
- Length: 43:15
- Label: Metal Blade
- Producers: Adam Dutkiewicz; As I Lay Dying

As I Lay Dying chronology
A Long March: The First Recordings (2006)	An Ocean Between Us (2007)	This Is Who We Are (2009)

Singles from An Ocean Between Us
- 1. "Nothing Left" Released: August 10, 2007; 2. "The Sound of Truth" Released: January 17, 2008

An Ocean Between Us is the fourth studio album by American metalcore band As I Lay Dying, released on August 21, 2007, by Metal Blade Records. It debuted at No. 8 on the Billboard 200, with sales close to 39,500. The album includes the Grammy-nominated single "Nothing Left", as well as the singles "The Sound of Truth", "Within Destruction", "I Never Wanted" and "An Ocean Between Us", with music videos produced for all five. "Nothing Left" appears on the radio soundtracks of the 2008 video games Saints Row 2 and Midnight Club: Los Angeles, and the song "The Sound of Truth" appears on the soundtrack of the 2009 video game MX vs. ATV Reflex. An Ocean Between Us is the band's first album to feature its "classic lineup," following the addition of bassist and clean vocalist Josh Gilbert in April 2007.

== Background ==
The band announced in April 2007 that bassist Josh Gilbert had filed the bassist position vacated by Clint Norris in 2006. Gilbert had previously played with Alabama-based band This Endearing. On Gilbert joining the band, Lambesis said they were aware of Josh's great bass playing and singing based on hearing his prior band; "But when he came out to San Diego to try out and rehearse with us, he ended up exceeding our expectations. Shortly after the try out we invited him to come back and fill in for us on our January U.K. tour. That tour really solidified the fact that Josh is the right guy for us."

On July 6, 2007, the band finalized the track listing for An Ocean Between Us, which was set to be released on August 21.

On July 26, the band finished recording a music video for the album's first single "Nothing Left." The video was shot in Van Nuys, California at Sound City Studios, and directed by Brian Thompson. Guitarist Nick Hipa said it was one of the band's favorite videos, and said conceptually it was akin to The Scarlet Letter. The video made its debut on Headbangers Ball on August 11, but was available for streaming on MTV's "Headbangers Blog" website on August 10. In January 2008, the band debuted a music video for the track "The Sound of Truth." Again directed by Thompson and shot at Sound City Studios, the video served as a continuation of the "Nothing Left" video, displaying "the irony and hypocrisy that takes place in a decaying futuristic society." "The Sound of Truth" video won "Best Music Video" at the Hollywood Discovery Awards in 2009.

The majority of the album was recorded at Lambesis' home studio, "Lambesis Studio," in San Diego, California. Adam Dutkiewicz collaborated with the band on recording and production. On June 1, 2007, producer Colin Richardson, announced he had concluded mixing duties, and called the album "brilliant."

On August 17, the band temporarily made the album available for streaming in its entirety on their MySpace profile.

In May 2008, the band released a music video for the track "Within Destruction." Filmed and directed by Jerry Club, the video is compiled from footage shot at their sold-out February 1, 2008 show at the Slowdown in Omaha, Nebraska.

On May 1, 2009, the band debuted a music video for the track "I Never Wanted," compiled primarily from footage taken from the DVD "This is Who We Are."

As with prior release Shadows Are Security, the album's artwork and design were provided by Jacob Bannon. The album features backing vocals from Destroy The Runner and Chapter 14 vocalist Chad Ackerman. Ackerman would again collaborate with the members of the band on Lambesis' side project Austrian Death Machine.

== Musical style ==
An Ocean Between Us is a metalcore album that incorporates elements of heavy metal, thrash metal, hardcore punk, and melodic death metal. Guitarist Nick Hipa said of the album's style, "collectively we've all pushed ourselves, and we're all doing things that we weren't even capable of doing on the last record. And on top of just experimenting and trying different things, I think we just wrote some pretty sick jams, so I'm happy with it."

Vocalist Tim Lambesis said "[we] spent some time listening to our last album [2005's Shadows Are Security] and, just from being on tour, we became a little bit jaded by how the genre — as a whole — has sort of copied itself over and over again. We decided we wanted to be more diverse, even down to the point where we sort of felt like we should really focus on writing songs in different categories, and then pick the best songs from those categories and use them for the record."

In an interview with HardcoreSounds.net Lambesis again referred to the album's content as "more diverse" than the prior record, adding; "some of the songs are darker and technical but there's also some melodic guitars like there were in 'Shadows Are Security'. Musically 'An Ocean Between Us' is more faster and heavier but lyrically the album is really memorable. If you put the two together it has a cool energy because everything is more balanced. I also had more time to focus on lyrics this time."

On the meaning of the album's title, Lambesis stated:

The title is about the separation we need to have between the expectations of the rest of the world and what our goals are. There are dreams we're taught are normal, whether it's money or success or any of those things, but we shouldn't believe in those things if they are not important to us. There is an ocean between our real lives and what is expected of us.

== Reception ==
Commercially, the album debuted, and peaked, on the Billboard 200 at no. 8 on September 8, 2007, spending 8 weeks on the chart. The album sold 39,500 copies in its first week, according to data from Nielsen SoundScan. As of 2025, it is the band's highest debut to date.

The album was well received; with reviewers praising As I Lay Dying's progression in both musicianship and songwriting. Chad Bowar of About.com described the album as more accessible and diverse than its predecessor, saying "As I Lay Dying has always been a band with a lot of crossover appeal with both metal and hardcore fans. They are the type of group that has the fanbase to play both Ozzfest and Warped Tour."

Professional ratings
Review scores
Source	Rating
About	3.5/5 stars
AllMusic	4/5 stars
Blabbermouth	8/10 stars
Cross Rhythms	10/10 stars
Exclaim!	Mildly positive
HM Magazine	"best metal album this year"
PopMatters	7/10 stars
Metal Underground	4.5/5 stars
Imperiumi	8.5/10 stars

The band was nominated for Grammy Award for Best Metal Performance at the 50th Annual Grammy Awards Awards for the track "Nothing Left," Lambesis and Hipa both took to their respective blogs to explain their reasons for not attending the ceremony (Lambesis) and attending the ceremony (Hipa).

Fans regard the guitar solo in the song "Nothing Left" as being among the best in the metalcore genre, according to Loudwire. In 2020 Loudwire ranked the album at #10 on their list of the 25 Greatest Metalcore Albums of All Time.

== Track listing ==
All lyrics are written by Tim Lambesis; all music is composed by As I Lay Dying.

No.	Title	Length
1.	"Separation" (instrumental)	1:15
2.	"Nothing Left"	3:43
3.	"An Ocean Between Us"	4:13
4.	"Within Destruction"	3:54
5.	"Forsaken"	5:18
6.	"Comfort Betrays"	2:50
7.	"I Never Wanted"	4:44
8.	"Bury Us All"	2:23
9.	"The Sound of Truth"	4:20
10.	"Departed" (instrumental)	1:40
11.	"Wrath Upon Ourselves"	4:01
12.	"This Is Who We Are"	4:54
Total length:		43:15

== Personnel ==
Production and performance credits are adapted from the album liner notes.

As I Lay Dying

- Tim Lambesis – unclean vocals, clean vocals (2, 12)
- Nick Hipa – guitars, backing vocals on "Bury Us All"
- Phil Sgrosso – guitars, backing vocals, piano, synthesizer
- Jordan Mancino – drums

Additional musicians

- Josh Gilbert – bass; additional lead vocals (3, 5, 7, 9, 11)
- Chad Ackerman – backing vocals on "An Ocean Between Us", "Bury Us All"
- Tommy Garcia – backing vocals on "Forsaken"
- Duane Reed – backing vocals on "Forsaken"

Additional personnel

- Adam Dutkiewicz – production
- Daniel Castleman – assisting production, mixing on "Departed"
- Colin Richardson – mixing all tracks except "Departed"
- Matt Hyde – mix engineering
- Andy Sneap – guitar re-amping
- Ted Jensen – mastering
- Jacob Bannon – artwork, layout

== Charts ==
Chart (2007)	Peak position
Austrian Albums (Ö3 Austria)	33
German Albums (Offizielle Top 100)	24
Japanese Albums (Oricon)	154
Swiss Albums (Schweizer Hitparade)	43
UK Albums (Official Charts)	117
UK Rock & Metal Albums (Official Charts)	8
US Billboard 200	8
US Digital Albums (Billboard)	8
US Independent Albums (Billboard)	2
US Top Hard Rock Albums (Billboard)	1
US Top Rock Albums (Billboard)	1
US Indie Store Album Sales (Billboard)	5

Year end chart (2007)	Position
US Independent Albums (Billboard)	32
