= The Edge of the Earth =

EP by Switchfoot
- Released: September 9, 2014
- Genre: Alternative rock
- Length: 29:39
- Label: lowercase people, Atlantic

Switchfoot chronology
| Fading West (2014) | The Edge of the Earth (2014) | Where the Light Shines Through (2016) |

Singles from The Edge of the Earth
- 1. "Fading West" Released: February 1, 2015; 2. "Against the Voices" Released: March 11, 2015; 3. "The Edge of the Earth" Released: May 15, 2015

Professional ratings
Review scores
| Source | Rating |
|---|---|
| CCM Magazine | 4/5 stars |
| Jesus Freak Hideout | 4.5/5 stars |
| New Release Tuesday | 5/5 stars |

The Edge of the Earth is an extended play by American rock band Switchfoot, released digitally on September 9, 2014, through lowercase people/Atlantic. It consists of previously unreleased songs from Switchfoot's rock documentary film Fading West.

The EP debuted at number 39 on the US Billboard 200 chart, and reached top 10 positions on Billboard Christian Albums, Soundtrack Albums and Top Alternative Albums charts.

== Songs ==
The first song on the record, "Fading West", is the only track that had been previously released, as the song was included on the physical edition of the Fading West EP, which was released in September 2013.

The second track, "Against the Voices", has been a "long-time fan favorite," as the song was first played by the band live in 2010. However, it hadn't made the cut for Switchfoot's two previous full-length albums, Vice Verses (2011) and Fading West (2014).

According to the band, the song "What It Costs" marked the first song recording for which bassist Tim Foreman provided lead vocals, replacing his brother Jon Foreman.

== Track listing ==
| No. | Title | Writer(s) | Length |
|---|---|---|---|
| 1. | "Fading West" | Jon Foreman, Tim Foreman | 4:19 |
| 2. | "Against the Voices" | J. Foreman | 4:17 |
| 3. | "Skin and Bones" | J. Foreman, T. Foreman | 4:02 |
| 4. | "What It Costs" | T. Foreman | 4:05 |
| 5. | "Slow Down My Heartbeat" | J. Foreman, T. Foreman | 4:39 |
| 6. | "Liberty" | J. Foreman | 4:04 |
| 7. | "The Edge of the Earth" | J. Foreman, T. Foreman | 4:13 |
| Total length: | | | 29:39 |

== Personnel ==
Switchfoot

- Jon Foreman – lead vocals (tracks 1–3, 5–7), rhythm guitar, lead guitar
- Tim Foreman – bass, lead vocals (track 4)
- Chad Butler – drums
- Jerome Fontamillas – keyboards, rhythm guitar
- Drew Shirley – lead guitar

Technical Personnel

- Neal Avron - production, engineering, mixing
- Tanner Sparks - engineering
- Adam Hawkins - engineering, mixing
- Eric Owyoung - mixing
- Ted Jensen - mastering

== Charts ==
| Chart (2014) | Peak Position |
|---|---|
| US Billboard 200 | 39 |
| US Top Christian Albums (Billboard) | 3 |
| US Digital Albums (Billboard) | 20 |
| US Soundtrack Albums (Billboard) | 3 |
| US Top Alternative Albums (Billboard) | 6 |
| US Top Rock Albums (Billboard) | 11 |

== See also ==
- Fading West (film)
