= Chad Ackerman =

American singer (born 1983)

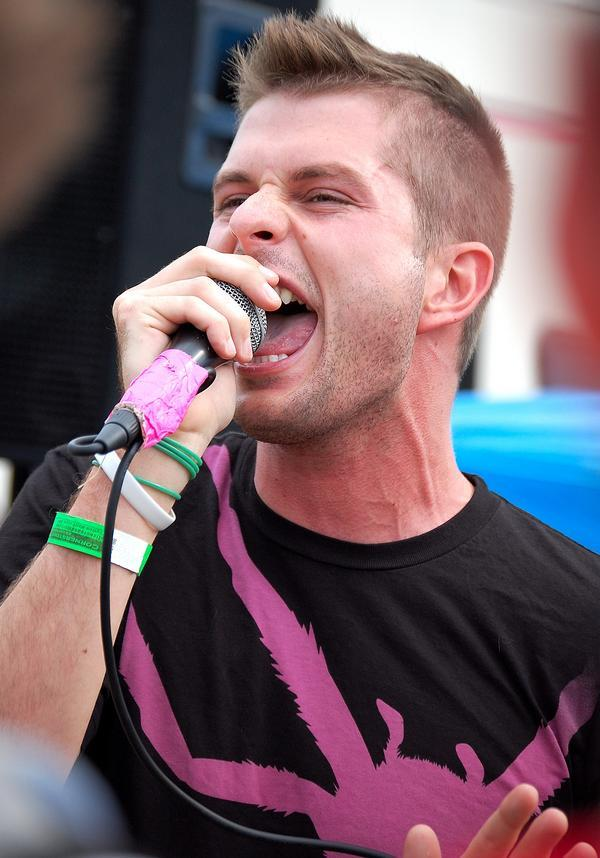
- Ackerman singing at Cornerstone Festival in Illinois, 2008

Background information
- Born: Chad Daniel Ackerman; November 30, 1983 (age 42)
- Genres: Post-hardcore, alternative rock, acoustic, heavy metal
- Occupations: Singer, songwriter, musician, producer
- Instruments: Vocals, guitar
- Years active: 1998–present
- Member of: Austrian Death Machine; Chapter 14
- Formerly of: Destroy the Runner; Die Trying

Chad Daniel Ackerman (born November 30, 1983) is an American rock musician. His debut as a singer/songwriter was in November 2012 under the name "AVEIL" with an album entitled The in Between. He has also been the vocalist for the bands Chapter 14, and Count Your Curses. He was the voice parody of Arnold Schwarzenegger for the band Austrian Death Machine. Ackerman was previously the vocalist for the band Destroy the Runner, guitarist for As I Lay Dying, and Die Trying.

== Biography ==
In 2002–03, Ackerman played rhythm guitar with As I Lay Dying at a number of live performances, including a full U.S. tour after his graduation from San Marcos High School. He did not appear on any of As I Lay Dying's studio recordings from that period, although he provided some backing vocals for their 2007 album An Ocean Between Us.

In 2005, he started the band Chapter 14 with Joel Piper of Confide, Noah Slifka of In Fear and Faith, and Michael Catalano of Destroy the Runner and Chiodos. Ackerman was the band's vocalist and founder. Chapter 14 went on two U.S. tours in 2005 and 2006 with unsigned self releases. In 2006, Ackerman filled in for the band Die Trying on Island Records, playing guitar for three months in Sacramento. The band broke up in the fall of 2007.

In the fall of 2007, Ackerman joined Destroy the Runner as the new vocalist, replacing previous vocalist Kyle Setter. The band did two U.S. tours with Ackerman, promoting their debut record Saints. Destroy The Runner then recorded their second studio album I, Lucifer in Baltimore with producer Brian McTernan. I, Lucifer was released on April 15, 2008, and the band has done three U.S. tours and one European tour promoting the album.

In 2008, Ackerman teamed up with vocalist Tim Lambesis of As I Lay Dying to record Total Brutal, the debut album for Lambesis' comic side project Austrian Death Machine. Ackerman voices all of the "Ahhnold" impersonations on Total Brutal and for the band's bonus disc A Very Brutal Christmas also in 2008.

Ackerman was working on the third Destroy the Runner album set to be released in 2010, but the band has since broken up as stated on their MySpace page and Chad has done several interviews about the breakup shortly after. On November 30, 2010, Ackerman released a Chapter 14 EP with Tanner Sparks (Destroy the Runner bassist) called "Like Trees in November". Ackerman was the vocalist of Count Your Curses, a three-piece trip-hop/electro rock group formed in January 2011. The project was a long-distance collaboration between Ackerman, kmotiv (Programming, Synth, and Keyboards) and Sean Sallings (Guitars, Bass, & Percussion); the band self-released three singles in 2011–2012. Ackerman is also currently producing bands, solo artists, and musicians.

On November 29, 2012, Ackerman announced on his Facebook page that his debut release under the name "AVEIL" was on YouTube, and that the album would be free for download or "name your own price" on November 30, 2012. This is Ackerman's first attempt as a singer/songwriter, and the album is entitled The in Between.

On May 30, 2013, the music video for "Tombs" was screened at the Portland Music Video Festival at the historical Hollywood Theater in downtown Portland, Oregon.

== Discography ==
With AVEIL

- The in Between (album), 2012; self-released
- The Great Magician (album), 2021; self-released

With Count Your Curses

- Zombie B-Boy (single), 2011; self-released
- Be Advised (single), 2012; self-released
- By A Thread (single), 2012; self-released

With Chapter 14

- Like Trees in November (5-song extended play), 2010; self-released
- The Bad Shepherd (single); self-released

With Destroy the Runner

- Saints (2006) (backing vocals) Solid State Records
- I, Lucifer, 2008 Solid State Records
- Saints – "Sinners" (B-side), 2009; self-released

With Austrian Death Machine

- Total Brutal, 2008
- A Very Brutal Christmas, 2008 (EP)
- Jingle All the Way (single), 2011, "I'm Not A Pervert"

With As I Lay Dying

- An Ocean Between Us, 2007 (backing vocals/screams)
- This Is Who We Are, 2009 (DVD) (performance/vocals on the song "Illusions")

== Producer ==
- Like Trees in November (5 song E.P.), 2010; self-released
- The Bad Shepherd (single), 2011; self-released
- Lower Definition – The Infinite Et Cetera, 2011; self-released
- Count Your Curses Distance, 2012; self-released
- AVEIL 2012 – The in Between
- AVEIL 2021 – The Great Magician
- "Tombs" music video

== Actor ==
- "Tombs" – AVEIL – music video – as Chicken – 2012
- "Repeater" – No Bragging Rights – music video – as Marine – 2012
- Terror Vortex – feature film – as Experimental Patient – 2013
- This Is Who We Are – As I Lay Dying – music documentary – as himself – 2009

== Director ==
- "Tombs" music video – 2012
- "The Bad Shepherd" music video – 2012

== Awards ==
On June 24, 2013, Ackerman received an Award of Excellence for Male Vocalist from the La Jolla Global Music Awards (GMA) for the album The in Between, as well as an Award of Merit for the "Tombs" music video.

In 2013, the video for "Tombs" was an official selection at The Great Lakes International Film Festival and also an official selection at the Portland Music Video Festival

== Sources ==
- Indie Vision Music. "Farewell From Chad Ackerman of DTR"
- San Diego Reader. Chapter 14 "We're Back, Full Throttle"
- Pure Grain Audio "Chapter 14 interview with Chad Ackerman"
- Bloody Disgusting Review "Bloody Disgusting Review of A VEIL's Tombs Music Video"
- Happy Cow Famous Vegan Celebrities "Chad Ackerman is a vegan"
- San Diego Reader Review/Interview "To Know A VEIL Is To Know Chad Ackerman"
- Punk World Views Review/Interview "Check Out: A VEIL"
- Horror-Fix "The Dead Run Amok in Chad Ackerman's Tombs!"
- La Jolla Global Music Awards "Award of Excellence "Male Vocalist" and Award of Merit "Tombs"
- Metal-Underground "Chad Ackerman Talks Destroy The Runner Breakup"
