= Void (EP) =

EP by Destroy the Runner
- Released: December 9, 2016
- Recorded: 2016
- Genre: Metalcore, progressive metal
- Length: 26:08
- Label: Independent

Destroy the Runner chronology
I, Lucifer (2008)	Void (2016)

Singles from Void
- 1. "End Transmission" Released: November 16, 2016; 2. "Underwater" Released: November 30, 2016

Void is the second EP by the metalcore band, Destroy the Runner. This is the first release from the band in 8 years. The album was released through digital and vinyl.

== Background ==
Following the release of their second LP I, Lucifer in 2008, Destroy the Runner announced they'd be going on "indefinite hiatus" in 2010.

In May of 2016, the band shared that they would be releasing an EP. The EP, which the band were crowdfunding, would feature the band's original lineup. In November of 2016, the band made a track from the release, titled "End Transmission," available for streaming on YouTube. The band also shared the release date for the record, December 9. The band posted a second track, "Underwater," on November 30.

== Track listing ==
No.	Title	Length
1.	"Bloom"	3:44
2.	"End Transmission"	3:36
3.	"Underwater"	5:14
4.	"Glass Sky"	3:37
5.	"Ivory"	5:24
6.	"Born to Hate"	4:31
Total length:		26:08

== Personnel ==
Destroy the Runner

- Kyle Setter – lead vocals
- Duane Reed – rhythm guitars, bass guitars, backing vocals, engineering
- Nick "Maldy" Maldonado – lead guitars, bass guitars
- Marc Kohlbry – drums

Production

- Andreas Magnusson – mixing
- Alan Douches – mastering
- Daniel Castleman – engineering
- Joey Bradford – engineering
- Tanner Sparks – additional editing
- Jordan Butcher (Studio Workhorse) – artwork
