= Who We Are (Switchfoot song) =

Single by Switchfoot

from the album Fading West
- Released: September 17, 2013
- Genre: Alternative rock, indie rock
- Length: 3:25
- Label: Atlantic/Word
- Songwriter(s): Jon Foreman

Switchfoot singles chronology
"Where I Belong" (2012)	"Who We Are" (2013)	"Love Alone Is Worth the Fight" (2013)

Music video
- Switchfoot – "Who We Are" on YouTube

"Who We Are" is a song by American alternative rock band Switchfoot, released on September 17, 2013, as the first track on the band's Fading West EP and one of two lead radio singles (alongside "Love Alone Is Worth the Fight") promoting Switchfoot's ninth studio album, Fading West, which was released on January 14, 2014. On January 21, a single containing three remixes of the song was released.

== Song theme and recording ==
In an interview with Rolling Stone, Switchfoot bassist Tim Foreman said, "This song takes me back to when our band was first starting out – driving around California stuffed into a minivan with guitars and drums, ready to take on the world. Armed with nothing but a few songs and a wild hope, we were dumb enough to think that it could work. Maybe that's the only way that the world has ever changed, by people dumb enough to try. So here's to everyone who's young and dumb enough to ignore the crowd and believe in who they are."

The song features vocals of Switchfoot members' children. One of the scenes in the Fading West film shows the recording of the song, with vocalist Jon Foreman sitting in the studio on the floor, conducting the children's choir.

== Critical reception ==
In a review for Indie Vision Music, Ian Zandi wrote that the song "sets the beat" and is the "best possible track they [Switchfoot] could have picked to be the start of the Fading West EP." He also added, "Jon sounds cleaner than ever before as his grizzly bear vocals are nowhere to be found. Musically, the song is very spacious. I would compare the atmosphere of the EP itself to the likes of Coldplay, Bon Iver and Arcade Fire. This is not to say that Switchfoot sounds like those bands. They don't really. It is more of the feeling of the music. It evokes emotions, it is relaxing, engaging, and it's encouraging. 'Who We Are' may not be my favourite Switchfoot song but it is very fitting."

== Music video ==
On September 18, 2013, a music video for "Who We Are" premiered on the Rolling Stone magazine website. It was released onto Switchfoot's official YouTube channel a day later, on September 19. The video consists of scenes from the band's rock documentary Fading West, which were filmed during Switchfoot's 2012 World Tour, in locations such as the U.S., South Africa, Bali, Australia and New Zealand.

== Track listing ==
Remixes Single
No.	Title	Length
1.	"Who We Are" (Michael Calfan Radio Edit)	3:20
2.	"Who We Are" (New World Sound Radio Edit)	3:15
3.	"Who We Are" (Dave Winnel Radio Edit)	3:07

== Charts ==
Chart (2013)	Peak position
US Hot Rock & Alternative Songs (Billboard)	28
US Rock Airplay (Billboard)	42
US Christian Songs (Billboard)	13
