= Native Tongue (Switchfoot album) =

2019 album by Switchfoot

Studio album by Switchfoot
- Released: January 18, 2019
- Recorded: 2018
- Studios: Melody League Studios, San Diego
- Genres: Alternative rock, pop rock
- Length: 51:19
- Label: Fantasy

Switchfoot chronology
| Where the Light Shines Through (2016) | Native Tongue (2019) | Native Tongue (Reimagine/ Remix) Ep (2020) |

Singles from Native Tongue
- 1. "Native Tongue" Released: October 19, 2018; 2. "Voices" Released: November 16, 2018; 3. "All I Need" Released: December 14, 2018; 4. "Let It Happen" Released: January 4, 2019; 5. "The Strength to Let Go" Released: July 2019; 6. "Joy Invincible" Released: 2020

Professional ratings
Review scores
| Source | Rating |
|---|---|
| Allmusic | 4/5 stars |

Native Tongue (stylized in all uppercase) is the eleventh studio album by American alternative rock band Switchfoot. It was released on January 18, 2019, through Fantasy Records. Native Tongue peaked at No. 41 in its opening week on the Billboard 200 chart and No. 2 on the Billboard Christian albums chart. At the 50th Dove Awards, Native Tongue won Rock/Contemporary Album of the Year.

== Promotion ==
=== Singles ===
"Native Tongue" was released on October 19, 2018, as the album's first single, and was written by Jon Foreman, Tim Foreman, and Brent Kutzle of OneRepublic. The video for the track premiered on Paste magazine's website the same day.

"Voices" was released on November 16, 2018, as the second single and the music video was released on the same day. Switchfoot promoted the album with a North American Native Tongue Tour, with supporting acts Colony House and Tyson Motsenbocker.

"All I Need" was released on December 14, 2018, across all streaming platforms, followed by "Let it Happen" on January 4, 2019.

=== Accolades ===
| Year | Organization | Award | Result | Ref. |
|---|---|---|---|---|
| 2019 | GMA Dove Awards | Rock/Contemporary Album of the Year | Won | |

Year-end lists
| Publication | Accolade | Rank | Ref. |
|---|---|---|---|
| 365 Days of Inspiring Media | Top 50 Albums of 2019 | 2 | |

== Track listing ==
All tracks are written by Jon Foreman and Tim Foreman, except where noted.

| No. | Title | Writer(s) | Producer(s) | Length |
|---|---|---|---|---|
| 1. | "Let It Happen" | Jon Foreman | J. Foreman; T. Foreman; Tyler Chester | 4:41 |
| 2. | "Native Tongue" | J. Foreman; T. Foreman; Brent Kutzle | J. Foreman; T. Foreman; Kutzle | 4:38 |
| 3. | "All I Need" | | J. Foreman; T. Foreman | 3:08 |
| 4. | "Voices" | J. Foreman; T. Foreman; Kutzle; Ryan Tedder; Tyler Spry | J. Foreman; T. Foreman; Kutzle; Spry | 2:58 |
| 5. | "Dig New Streams" | | J. Foreman; Tim Foreman | 3:45 |
| 6. | "Joy Invincible" | | J. Foreman; T. Foreman | 3:42 |
| 7. | "Prodigal Soul" | | J. Foreman; T. Foreman | 3:51 |
| 8. | "The Hardest Art" (featuring Kaela Sinclair) | | J. Foreman; T. Foreman; Kutzle; Spry | 4:13 |
| 9. | "Wonderful Feeling" | | J. Foreman; T. Foreman | 4:06 |
| 10. | "Take My Fire" | | J. Foreman; T. Foreman | 3:45 |
| 11. | "The Strength to Let Go" | | J. Foreman; T. Foreman | 4:18 |
| 12. | "Oxygen" | | J. Foreman; T. Foreman | 4:14 |
| 13. | "We're Gonna Be Alright" | | J. Foreman; T. Foreman; Chester | 2:55 |
| 14. | "You're the One I Want" | J. Foreman | J. Foreman; T. Foreman | 2:05 |
| Total length: | | | | 51:19 |

Switchfoot.com bonus tracks
| No. | Title | Length |
|---|---|---|
| 15. | "All I Need" (West Coast Edition) | 3:23 |
| 16. | "Let's Go Higher" | 4:59 |
| 17. | "Native Tongue" (Acoustic) | 4:34 |

Walmart bonus tracks
| No. | Title | Writer(s) | Length |
|---|---|---|---|
| 15. | "White Lies" | J. Foreman | 4:09 |
| 16. | "Don't Want Your Money" | J. Foreman, T. Foreman | 3:10 |
| 17. | "All I Need" (Acoustic) | J. Foreman, T. Foreman | 3:10 |

== History ==
Native Tongue is Switchfoot's first studio album since Learning to Breathe (in 2000) not to crack the top 20 on the Billboard 200. It is also Switchfoot's first studio album since Hello Hurricane, in 2009, not to peak at No. 1 on the Billboard Top Christian Albums chart. It is Switchfoot's longest studio album by track listing, and the second-longest by duration, beaten only by Vice Verses.

== Personnel ==
Switchfoot

- Jon Foreman – lead vocals, guitar
- Tim Foreman – bass guitar, background vocals, lead vocals (track 5)
- Chad Butler – drums, percussion
- Jerome Fontamillas – keyboards, guitar
- Drew Shirley – guitar

Technical

- The Foreman Brothers – producer
- Brent Kutzle – producer (tracks 2, 4, 8)
- Tyler Chester – producer (tracks 1, 14)
- Tanner Sparks – engineer, mixing (tracks 3, 5–14, bonus tracks)
- Tyler Spry – producer, engineer (tracks 2, 4, 8)
- Bear Rinehart – additional production (track 11)
- Adam Hawkins – mixing (track 1)
- Bryan Cook – mixing (track 8)
- John Nathaniel – mixing (tracks 2, 4)
- Joe Laporta – mastering
- Paul Blakemore – mastering (bonus tracks)
- Brandon Collins – string arrangement

Additional instrumentation

- Kaela Sinclair – vocals (track 8)
- Tanner Sparks – guitar (tracks 1, 2, 4)
- Tyler Chester – keyboards, acoustic guitar (tracks 1, 9, 13)
- Brent Kutzle – guitar, keyboards (tracks 2, 4, 8)
- Tyler Spry – background vocals, programming, keyboards, guitar (tracks 2, 4, 8)
- Bear Rinehart – keyboards (track 11)
- Steve Wilmot – programming (track 8)
- John Painter – marching drums, horns, strings (tracks 2, 5)
- David Davidson – violin (tracks 4, 7)
- David Angell – violin (tracks 4, 7)
- Monisa Angell – viola (track 7)
- Betsy Lamb – viola (track 4)
- Craig Nelson – contrabass (track 4)
- Paul Nelson – cello (tracks 4, 7)
- Keith Tutt II – cello (track 14)

== Charts ==
Chart performance for Native Tongue
| Chart (2019) | Peak position |
|---|---|
| Australian Digital Albums (ARIA) | 20 |
| US Billboard 200 | 41 |
| US Top Christian Albums (Billboard) | 2 |
| US Top Alternative Albums (Billboard) | 5 |
| US Top Rock Albums (Billboard) | 4 |
| US Vinyl Albums (Billboard) | 22 |
