= Vice Re-Verses =

EP by Switchfoot
- Released: April 21, 2012
- Genre: Alternative rock, dubstep, dance
- Length: 25:49
- Label: Atlantic

Switchfoot chronology
Vice Verses (2011)	Vice Re-Verses (2012)	Fading West EP (2013)

Vice Re-Verses is an EP of "remixed" Switchfoot songs from the band's eighth studio album Vice Verses (2011).The CD Edition of the EP was made and sold for Record Store Day 2012.

== Critical reception ==
Professional ratings
Review scores
Source	Rating
Indie Vision Music	3/5 stars
Jay's Musik Blog	4/5 stars
Jesus Freak Hideout	3.5/5 stars
Louder Than the Music	4.5/5 stars

Vice Re-Verses received generally positive reception from four music critics. At Jesus Freak Hideout, Roger Gelwicks rated it three-and-a-half stars, writing that "Casual fans of Switchfoot need not apply, but the band's die-hards are sure in for an interesting ride with the ups and downs of Vice Re-Verses." Jono Davies of Louder Than the Music rated it four-and-a-half stars, commenting that he really "enjoyed" the release on which "It has some really great tracks that are completely different to the original versions, but still with that great Switchfoot sound and quality." At Indie Vision Music, Shawn H. rated it three stars, highlighted the album as a "great companion piece" to the original Vice Verses that he believed you may need to be a Switchfoot fan "to truly enjoy what these remixes have to offer." Jay Wright of Jay's Music Blog rated it four stars, affirming that the diehard fan of the band will love them because "The electronic and futuristic remixes make these fan-favorites and radio singles come alive."

== Track listing ==
No.	Title	Writer(s)	Length
1.	"The Original" (JT Daly of Paper Route Remix)	Jon Foreman, Tim Foreman	3:58
2.	"Selling the News" (Photek Remix)	J. Foreman	3:27
3.	"Blinding Light" (Adam Young of Owl City Remix)	J. Foreman, T. Foreman	4:38
4.	"Darkest Horses" (JT Daly of Paper Route Remix)	J. Foreman, T. Foreman	3:59
5.	"Vice Verses" (Darren King Remix)	J. Foreman	5:03
6.	"The War Inside" (DnJ Remix)	J. Foreman, T. Foreman	4:45
7.	"Afterlife" (Neon Feather Remix)	J. Foreman, T. Foreman	3:27
Total length:			25:15
