= Destroy the Runner =

American metalcore band

- Also known as: Die Like Me (2004–2006)
- Origin: San Diego, California, U.S.
- Genres: Melodic metalcore
- Years active: 2004–2010, 2016–present
- Label: Solid State
- Members: Duane Reed; Nick "Maldy" Maldonado; Kyle Setter; Marc Kohlbry
- Past members: Chad Ackerman; Tanner Sparks; Jeremiah Crespo; Mike Catalano

Destroy the Runner is an American melodic metalcore band from San Diego, California. The band released two full-length albums via Solid State Records prior to going on hiatus in 2010. In 2016 the band's original members reunited and independently released the band's latest effort Void.

The band is closely linked with fellow San Diego metal outfit As I Lay Dying. Both bands have shared members and personnel throughout their careers, and members from both bands have collaborated on various projects together. Additionally, As I Lay Dying vocalist Tim Lambesis managed Destroy the Runner for their albums Saints, and did so again with Jason Rudolph for their second album I, Lucifer.

== History ==
Destroy the Runner was formed under the name "Die Like Me" in 2004 by members Kyle Setter (vocals), Duane Reed and Nick Maldonado (guitar), Jeremiah Crespo (bass), and Marc Kohlbry (drums). That same year, the band self-released an EP titled Welcome to Eternity before going on to sign with Solid State Records in June 2006. In a 2010 interview with Metal Underground, vocalist Chad Ackerman (who would replace Setter in 2007), explained that the band took its name from the 1967 film Logan's Run. A month after signing with Solid State, the band played at the Cornerstone Festival in Bushnell, Illinois.

Solid State released the band's debut album Saints on September 12, 2006, to mixed reviews. A music video was recorded for the title track, “Saints.” It was the band’s first music video.

Following the album's release, Destroy the Runner began touring; joining up with The Chariot, August Burns Red, Twelve Gauge Valentine, and Inhale/Exhale as part of the "Youngbloods II" tour. The band also joined a tour supporting Haste the Day and Scary Kids Scaring Kids.

Both Kyle Setter and Jeremiah Crespo would leave the band in 2007, and were replaced by Chad Ackerman and Tanner Sparks, who were then part of Chapter 14.

In October 2007, the band began recording their second LP with Brian McTernan at Salad Days Studios in Baltimore, MD.

On April 15, 2008, Destroy the Runner released I, Lucifer. The album has a more progressive sound, with less screaming than their previous album. It charted in the U.S. on the Billboard Top Christian Albums chart at No. 27 and on the Top Heatseekers chart at No. 25.

The band released a Christmas song, "Destroy the Jingle" via their MySpace page on December 10, 2008.

On December 15, 2009, the band made available a previously unreleased B-Side from 'Saints' as a digital download. Titled "Sinners," the band explained the song, originally titled "Twelve Pieces," had been written by original vocalist Kyle Setter, but was we-written by Ackerman prior to its release.

On October 23, 2009, Ackerman announced the band was in the studio recording an upcoming album but that a release date was not yet set. Via his YouTube channel answering fan questions the album Ackerman noted the album would be heavier than I, Lucifer, feature more screaming, and would feature Jordan Mancino of As I Lay Dying on drums. On March 22, 2010, the band announced Living Sacrifice frontman Bruce Fitzhugh would be tracking guest vocals for the album, which was expected out later in the year.

On May 16, 2010, Destroy the Runner announced that they would taking an "indefinite hiatus." In several interviews, Ackerman stated that Reed and Maldonado wanted to end the band in 2010 to focus on other material. As the last two founding members left in the band's lineup, they would not allow Ackerman and Sparks to continue on with the Destroy the Runner name, despite Ackerman and Sparks wishing to continue writing and recording the band's third album, which was left unfinished.

On April 22, 2016, the band updated their Facebook. This update hinted at new material, and also reestablished the band's original members to their current lineup.

On May 1, 2016, the band announced that the four original band members were regrouping and had already written songs that were ready to be recorded for an EP, Void, through an Indiegogo campaign. The band streamed their first single from the album "End Transmission" on November 16, 2016, and released an accompanying lyric video They would additionally release a lyric video for the song "Underwater" on November 30.

== Band members ==
Current lineup

- Nick "Maldy" Maldonado – lead guitar (2004–2010, 2016–present)
- Duane Reed – rhythm guitar, vocals (2004–2010, 2016–present)
- Kyle Setter – lead vocals (2004–2007, 2016–present)
- Marc Kohlbry – drums (2004–2008, 2016–present)
- Tanner Sparks – bass guitar (2007–2010, 2016–present)

Former members

- Chad Ackerman – lead vocals (2007–2010)
- Mike Catalano – drums (2008–2010)
- Jeremiah Crespo – bass guitar (2005–2007)

Timeline

== Discography ==
Studio albums

- Saints (2006), Solid State Records
- I, Lucifer (2008), Solid State Records

EPs

- Die Like Me (2004), self-released
- Void (2016), self-released

Singles

- "End Transmission" (2016)

Music videos

- "Saints" (from Saints)
- "Isabella's" (from I, Lucifer)
