= Love Alone Is Worth the Fight =

Single by Switchfoot

from the album Fading West
- Released: September 17, 2013
- Length: 4:35
- Label: Atlantic/Word
- Songwriter(s): Jon Foreman

Switchfoot singles chronology
"Who We Are" (2013)	"Love Alone Is Worth the Fight" (2013)	"Let It Out" (2014)

Music video
- Switchfoot – Love Alone Is Worth The Fight on YouTube

"Love Alone Is Worth the Fight" is a song by American alternative rock band Switchfoot, released on September 17, 2013, on the band's Fading West EP. The song serves as one of two lead singles (alongside "Who We Are") from Switchfoot's ninth studio album Fading West, which was released on January 14, 2014.

== Music video ==
A music video for "Love Alone Is Worth the Fight" was released on October 1, 2013. It consists of scenes shot for the band's rock documentary film Fading West, directed by Matt Katsolis. They were filmed during Switchfoot's 2012 World Tour, in locations such as the U.S., South Africa, Bali, Australia and New Zealand.

== Awards ==
=== GMA Dove Awards ===
Year	Category	Nominee / Work	Result
2014	Rock/Contemporary Song of the Year	Love Alone Is Worth the Fight	Nominated

== Charts ==
The song peaked at number 6 on the Billboard Christian Songs, number 12 on the Christian Rock, and at number 21 on the Hot Rock Songs charts.

Chart (2013–14)	Peak position
US Christian Songs (Billboard)	6
US Christian Airplay (Billboard)	14
US Hot Rock & Alternative Songs (Billboard)	21
