= Bury Me Alive =

Bury Me Alive may refer to:

- "Bury Me Alive" (song), a 2010 song by We Are the Fallen
- Bury Me Alive (album), a 2009 album by Inhale Exhale
