= Where the Light Shines Through =

2016 studio album by Switchfoot

Studio album by Switchfoot
- Released: July 8, 2016
- Recorded: 2015–16
- Studio: Spot X Studio, San Diego, CA
- Genre: Alternative rock; pop rock; power pop; Christian rock
- Length: 49:33
- Label: Vanguard
- Producer: Switchfoot; John Fields

Switchfoot chronology
The Edge of the Earth (2014)	Where the Light Shines Through (2016)	Native Tongue (2019)

Singles from Where the Light Shines Through
- 1. "Live It Well" Released: May 12, 2016; 2. "Float" Released: May 12, 2016; 3. "I Won't Let You Go" Released: November 11, 2016; 4. "Shake This Feeling" Released: May 5, 2017; 5. "If the House Burns Down Tonight" Released: August 17, 2017

Professional ratings
Review scores
Source	Rating
AllMusic	4/5 stars
JesusFreakHideout	4/5 stars
Newsday	B+
NewReleaseToday	4.5/5 stars
CCM Magazine	5/5 stars

Where the Light Shines Through is the tenth studio album by American rock band Switchfoot, released on July 8, 2016. The album was recorded in the band's recording studio Spot X in their hometown San Diego, and produced by Switchfoot and John Fields, with whom the band has worked on their breakthrough album The Beautiful Letdown (2003) and its follow-ups, Nothing Is Sound (2005) and Oh! Gravity. (2006). It is Switchfoot's first and only album to be released through Vanguard Records.

== Promotion ==
On March 10, 2016, Switchfoot released a behind-the-scenes video showing the band working on their tenth studio album. Album title and release date were officially announced on May 12, 2016. Later the same day, the band released a trailer for the album, and a music video for an acoustic version of "Live It Well" onto YouTube. "Float" was released to radio on May 18, 2016. An official music video for "Float", filmed in Manila, was released at 6:00 a.m. Pacific Time on May 25, 2016. The band premiered the title track "Where the Light Shines Through" on June 3, 2016, at the Del Mar Fair in San Diego, CA. Six days later, they released the official studio recording of the same track on iTunes.

== Track listing ==
No.	Title	Writer(s)	Length
1.	"Holy Water"	Jon Foreman; Tim Foreman	3:47
2.	"Float"	J. Foreman; T. Foreman	4:12
3.	"Where the Light Shines Through"	J. Foreman; T. Foreman	4:24
4.	"I Won't Let You Go"	J. Foreman; T. Foreman	4:47
5.	"If the House Burns Down Tonight"	J. Foreman; T. Foreman; Mike Elizondo	4:31
6.	"The Day That I Found God"	J. Foreman; T. Foreman	4:18
7.	"Shake This Feeling"	J. Foreman; T. Foreman	3:37
8.	"Bull in a China Shop"	J. Foreman; T. Foreman; Elizondo	3:58
9.	"Live It Well"	J. Foreman; T. Foreman	3:56
10.	"Looking for America" (featuring Lecrae)	J. Foreman; T. Foreman; Lecrae	3:55
11.	"Healer of Souls"	J. Foreman; T. Foreman	3:47
12.	"Hope Is the Anthem"	J. Foreman	4:21
Total length:			49:33

Deluxe Edition bonus tracks
No.	Title	Writer(s)	Length
13.	"Light and Heavy"	J. Foreman, T. Foreman	3:33
14.	"Begin Forever"	J. Foreman, T. Foreman, Danielle Brisbois	3:58
15.	"When Was the Last Time"	J. Foreman, T. Foreman, Elizondo, Chad Butler	3:19
Total length:			60:23

Digital pre-order bonus tracks
No.	Title	Length
13.	"Light and Heavy"	3:33
14.	"Begin Forever"	3:58
15.	"When Was the Last Time"	3:19
16.	"Bloodline"	4:52
17.	"My Place in the Sunlight"	4:01
Total length:		69:16

== Personnel ==
Switchfoot

- Jon Foreman – lead vocals, guitar
- Tim Foreman – bass guitar, background vocals
- Chad Butler – drums, percussion
- Jerome Fontamillas – keyboards, guitar
- Drew Shirley – guitar

Technical

- Switchfoot – production
- John Fields – production
- Lenny Skolnik − additional production ("Float")
- Joseph Barba − additional production ("I Won't Let You Go")
- Tanner Sparks – engineering, mixing
- Paul David Hager – mixing

Additional musicians

- Lecrae – vocals ("Looking for America")
- Eric Owyoung − strings ("Hope Is the Anthem")
- Keith Tutt II − cello section ("I Won't Let You Go")
- John Painter − horns ("Healer of Souls")
- Boaz Roberts − guitar ("The Day That I Found God")
- Robert Randolph − pedal steel ("The Day That I Found God")
- Sam Dark – oboe ("Looking for America")

== Charts ==
=== Weekly charts ===
Weekly chart performance for Where the Light Shines Through
Chart (2016)	Peak position
Australian Albums (ARIA)	34
Canadian Albums (Billboard)	20
New Zealand Heatseekers Albums (RMNZ)	1
Swiss Albums (Schweizer Hitparade)	69
US Billboard 200	10
US Top Christian Albums (Billboard)	1
US Top Alternative Albums (Billboard)	3
US Top Rock Albums (Billboard)	3

=== Year-end charts ===
2016 year-end chart performance for Where the Light Shines Through
Chart (2016)	Peak position
US Christian Albums (Billboard)	28
