= I Swear (album) =

I Swear...

Studio album by Inhale Exhale
- Released: June 10, 2008
- Recorded: December 2007
- Studio: Lakeside Studio at Knoxville, Tennessee
- Genre: Metalcore, post-hardcore, alternative metal
- Length: 44:17
- Label: Solid State Records
- Producer: Travis Wyrick

Inhale Exhale chronology
The Lost. The Sick. The Sacred. (2006)	I Swear... (2008)	Bury Me Alive (2009)

Singles from I Swear...
- 1. "It's Myself Vs. Being A Man" Released: June 30, 2008

Professional ratings
Review scores
Source	Rating
Indie Vision Music	9/10

I Swear... is the second studio album by American metalcore band Inhale Exhale. It was released on June 10, 2008, through Solid State Records. The booklet that comes with the CD has the lyrics written in code. A key to the code is located inside the jewel case behind the CD.

== Track listing ==
1. I Needed A Space Ship (Instead I Got Problems) - 3:34
2. It's Myself Vs. Being A Man - 4:55
3. The Impatient Will Suffer - 4:40
4. Is The Fact That I'm Trying To Do It, Doing It For You? - 3:26
5. I Live The Bad Life (You Make It Worse) - 3:46
6. No One Is Invincible - 4:34
7. The Words That We Have Chosen - 3:38
8. Drink Till We Drop - 3:19
9. I'll Die With No Friends And A Grin On My Face - 4:00
10. Fluvanna - 4:07
11. Knowledge = Priceless - 4:18

== Personnel ==
- Ryland Raus – vocals
- John LaRussa – guitar
- Chris "Gator" Carroll – drums, percussion
- Jeremy Gifford – bass

Production

- Travis Wyrick – producer, engineering, mixing, mastering
- Don Clark (musician) – design
- Chad Johnson – A&R
- Mike Dearing – engineering
