= Restless (Switchfoot song) =

Single by Switchfoot

from the album Vice Verses
- Released: July 2011
- Recorded: 2011
- Genre: Alternative rock
- Length: 5:18 (Album version); 4:06 (Radio edit)
- Label: lowercase people/Atlantic/Credential Recordings
- Songwriter(s): Jon Foreman
- Producer(s): Switchfoot; Neal Avron

Switchfoot singles chronology
"Dark Horses" (2011)	"Restless" (2011)	"Afterlife" (2012)

"Restless" is a song written and recorded by American alternative rock band Switchfoot, and a radio single from Vice Verses, their eighth studio album. It served as the album's co-lead single with "Dark Horses".

== Song history ==
Lead singer and principal songwriter for the band Jon Foreman wrote the song in Europe, with the intent of "trying to embody the story of the rain," which comes from the idea that raindrops are on a "relentless" journey back to the ocean. "I was thinking about the idea that I'm on a journey myself," he says. "...reaching and searching and longing for more.

The song first made a public appearance in April 2011 when Foreman performed an acoustic rendition live at Calvin College in Grand Rapids, Michigan. It was later performed by the full band on May 18 in London, Ontario during a brief Canadian tour.

The official music video for the song debuted on 31 October 2011. It was directed by Tom Aiello.

== Reception ==
"Restless" was released to Christian CHR radio in July alongside Switchfoot's mainstream single, "Dark Horses." Air1 picked up the song on July 18, 2011.

== Charts ==
Chart (2011)	Peak position
US Alternative Digital Song Sales (Billboard)	15
US Christian Songs (Billboard)	23
US Rock Digital Songs (Billboard)	25
