= Fading West (EP) =

EP by Switchfoot
- Released: September 17, 2013
- Recorded: 2012–13
- Studio: Spot X Studio, San Diego, CA
- Genre: Alternative rock, pop rock
- Length: 12:43 (digital copy); 17:02 (physical copy)
- Label: Atlantic/Word
- Producer: Switchfoot, Neal Avron

Switchfoot chronology
Vice Re-Verses (2012)	Fading West (EP) (2013)	Fading West (2014)

Fading West (EP) is an extended play by Switchfoot, released on September 17, 2013 through Atlantic Records/Word. Produced by the band and Neal Avron, it contains three songs from Switchfoot's ninth studio album Fading West. A special physical edition of the EP featured a bonus track titled "Fading West".

== Release ==
Fading West EP was released on September 17, 2013 through Atlantic Records/Word. It contained three songs from the band's ninth studio album Fading West, which was released on January 14, 2014. A special physical edition of the EP, only available on Switchfoot's 2013 fall tour and on the band's official website, featured a bonus track "Fading West", which wasn't included on the full album.

The EP was part of a "complete my album" program, meaning that people who bought it would be able to download the remaining tracks from the Fading West album for free, upon the album's release in January 2014.

== Critical reception ==
Professional ratings
Review scores
Source	Rating
Indie Vision Music	5/5 stars
Jesus Freak Hideout	4/5 stars
Louder Than the Music	4/5 stars

Ian Zandi of Indie Vision Music rated the EP a perfect five stars and wrote, "Fading West is not the end of Switchfoot. Instead, it is the opening of the next chapter in their globetrotting journey to pursue love and justice. The Fading West EP may not be the best Switchfoot songs ever written. Do they necessarily have to be? Maybe the best is yet to come on the full-length album. This EP is merely just a sample of what we can expect to hear in the movie and on the soundtrack. We were given a theme song, a classic Switchfoot song, and the next possible step in their musical endeavors."

== Track listing ==
No.	Title	Length
1.	"Who We Are"	3:25
2.	"Love Alone Is Worth the Fight"	4:34
3.	"Ba55"	4:44
Total length:		12:43

Physical edition bonus track
No.	Title	Length
4.	"Fading West"	4:19
Total length:		17:02

== Personnel ==
Switchfoot

- Jon Foreman – guitar, lead vocals
- Tim Foreman – bass, backing vocals
- Chad Butler – drums, percussion
- Jerome Fontamillas – keyboard, guitar, backing vocals
- Andrew Shirley – guitar, backing vocals

Technical personnel

- Neal Avron – production
- Tanner Sparks - engineering

== See also ==
- Fading West
- Fading West (film)
