= The Lost. The Sick. The Sacred. =

Studio album by Inhale Exhale
- Released: November 21, 2006
- Studio: Lakeside Studios at Knoxville, Tennessee
- Genres: Christian metalcore, nu metal
- Length: 36:27
- Label: Solid State Records
- Producer: Travis Wyrick

Inhale Exhale chronology
The Lost. The Sick. The Sacred. (2006)	I Swear... (2008)

Singles from The Lost. The Sick. The Sacred.
- 1. "Redemption" Released: February 21, 2007; 2. "A Call to the Faithful" Released: July 26, 2007

Professional ratings
Review scores
Source	Rating
AllMusic	3/5 stars

The Lost. The Sick. The Sacred. is the debut album by the American metalcore band Inhale Exhale. It was released on November 21, 2006, through Solid State Records.

== Track listing ==
1. "Redemption" - 3:40
2. "By Grace" - 3:21
3. "Frail Dreams & Rude Awakenings" - 3:11
4. "Dance All Night" - 2:47
5. "A Call To The Faithful" - 3:50
6. "Touch Of Deception" - 3:29
7. "Your Walls... My Words" - 2:58
8. "Tonight We Die Together" - 3:39
9. "Sons Of Tomorrow (To Noah James)" - 2:35
10. "Rose Among The Ashes" - 2:20
11. "The Lost. The Sick. The Sacred." - 4:37

== Credits ==
- Ryland Raus - vocals
- John LaRussa - guitars, keyboards, backing vocals
- Brian Pittman - bass
- Bobby Poole - drums, percussion, backing vocals

Production

- Travis Wyrick - producer, engineering, mixing
- Mike Dearing - engineering
- Troy Gelssner - mastering
- Chad Johnson - A&R
- Ryan Clark (musician) - design
