= Wake Up, Mr Crow =

"Wake Up, Mr. Crow"

Single by Switchfoot

from the album Forever Now
- Released: March 27, 2026
- Studio: Phantom Studios
- Label: BMG, By Design Music
- Songwriters: Jon Foreman, Tim Foreman
- Producer: Mike Elizondo

Switchfoot singles chronology
"Youth of the Young" (2022)	"Wake Up, Mr. Crow" (2026)	"Absolution" (2026)

"Wake Up, Mr. Crow" is a song by American rock band Switchfoot released as the lead single from their fourteenth studio album, Forever Now. It was released to all formats on March 27, 2026. It was promoted with the release of a music video, which was uploaded to YouTube.

== Commercial performance ==
In the United Kingdom, the song appeared at No. 2 on the Cross Rhythms Christian Airplay chart.

== Charts ==
Weekly chart performance for "Wake Up, Mr. Crow"
Chart (2026)	Peak position
UK Christian Airplay (Cross Rhythms)	2
US Christian Rock (CR.net)	6
