= Shock Value (Twelve Gauge Valentine album) =

Studio album by Twelve Gauge Valentine
- Released: October 3, 2006
- Genre: Metalcore; Christian metal; Southern metal
- Length: 31:30
- Label: Solid State; Tooth & Nail
- Producer: Fred Archambault

Twelve Gauge Valentine chronology
Exclamationaire EP (2005)	Shock Value (2006)

Shock Value is the only album made by the metalcore band, Twelve Gauge Valentine. This is the only production to not feature guitarist Josh Gross.

== Critical reception ==
Professional ratings
Review scores
Source	Rating
Indie Vision Music	3/5 stars
Jesus Freak Hideout	3.5/5 stars
Cross Rhythms	5/10

"Throughout the course of Shock Value if there's any single band member that dominates the tracks, it's the vocalist. However, if you delve a little deeper into the music you realize that they've got solid musicianship backing him up, delivering that one-two punch that Southern metalcore really needs to stay alive. If you can get past the fairly tedious nature of the album (much of it does sound the same) and really get into it, I can attest that Shock Value will stand as an impressive album for anyone interested in southern metalcore." says Absolute Punk.

Mark Sherwood of Cross Rhythms writes "This Louisiana band describe themselves as "metal n roll" according to their Myspace web page and "imagine the. . .metallic hardcore of Norma Jean and. . .the butt kicking rock of AC/DC" you have an idea of where they are coming from. The guys apparently come from a sleepy town where nothing much happens and this gave birth to the "creative havoc" that is 12 Gauge. However, I will be honest - I don't get it! Apparently they have fans who love their music and are a hard gigging crew. I found the lyrics hard to follow (perhaps I'm missing something) and that was reading the lyric sheet (some words are hard to see!), the music blended into each other and I could not distinguish one song from another. I played it to two 16 year olds and they were even less complimentary!"

"If these guys went back on tour again, I can see them performing with He Is Legend and Every Time I Die. There is not a single ballad on Shock Value, which is a definite plus because it would have ruined the creativity of Twelve Gauge Valentine. Other than confusing lyrics and satire, the major downfall of Shock Value is that it is too short. There is plenty of energy on this record, but rocking out to eleven songs for less than 32 minutes is a catastrophe. Now don't get me wrong -- these guys rock and they do not have one bad song on this album. Shock Value might not live up to its full potential, but it is a good and creative effort. Fans of Southern hardcore music should give this album a listen." writes Fred Keel of Jesus Freak Hideout.

== Track listing ==
All lyrics written and composed by Twelve Gauge Valentine

No.	Title	Length
1.	"Intro"	0:31
2.	"Casket Junkie"	3:36
3.	"Danger lurking"	3:09
4.	"Dive-Bomb"	2:59
5.	"Clash Of The Titans"	2:24
6.	"The Juggernaut Prevails"	2:18
7.	"99 With An Anchor"	2:16
8.	"Bone Crusher"	4:06
9.	"Ball & Chain"	2:23
10.	"Search Of The Alley Dwellers"	3:29
11.	"Nicotine Queen"	4:21

== Personnel ==
Twelve Gauge Valentine

- Jon Green - Vocals
- Josh White - Guitar
- Jonathan Cooper - Bass
- Jonathan Webster - Drums

Vocal Coach & Drum Tech

- Mark Renk - Vocal Coach
- Mike Fasano - Drum Tech

Production

- Recorded at Hobby Shop
- Produced & Engineered by Fred Archambault
- Mixed by Eddie Wohl & Rob Caggiano
- Mastered by Troy Glessner
- A&R by Zaine Tarpo

Art

- Art Direction by Invisible Creature
- Design by Don Clark of Invisible Creature
