= Dark Horses (song) =

Single by Switchfoot

from the album Vice Verses
- Released: July 20, 2011
- Recorded: 2011
- Genre: Alternative rock, post-grunge, hard rock
- Length: 3:59
- Label: lowercase people/Atlantic
- Songwriter(s): Jon Foreman, Tim Foreman
- Producer(s): Switchfoot, Neal Avron

Switchfoot singles chronology
"Bullet Soul" (2010)	"Dark Horses" (2011)	"Restless" (2011)

"Dark Horses" is a song written and recorded by the alternative rock band Switchfoot, and serves as the first single from their eighth studio album entitled Vice Verses. It was debuted on the band's official website on July 20, 2011 and serviced to radio on August 2, 2011. The release was announced on AllAccess/Mediabase and later confirmed by singer Jon Foreman during an interview with radio DJ Adrian Hummel.

== Song history ==
The song first made a public appearance on June 10, 2010 in Amsterdam during Switchfoot's Hello Hurricane tour. The band sound-checked it once there, and also subsequently played it at several more shows during the fall leg of their tour.

It was reworked afterwards during the studio sessions for Vice Verses, and the band debuted the revamped version with a new chorus with different melodies and a re-worked second verse in Winnipeg, Manitoba, Canada in May 2011.

The band performed it throughout the summer festival season, and also allowed fans to preview it at their Bro-Am event in June.

Singer Jon Foreman has from time to time stated that the song is an anthem for Stand Up For Kids, an organization that aids orphaned youth back in the band's hometown of San Diego, CA. "For me that song the Dark Horses is all about the homeless kids back in San Diego, specifically the ones who are being helped out by Stand Up For Kids," he says. "It's always nice when you have a song you are passionate about singing night after night that has a deeper meaning than simply another verse and another chorus."

== Other uses ==
- The song was featured on ESPN College Football broadcasts in the 2011 season.
- It was the official theme for WWE's 2012 Royal Rumble.
- The song was featured on a Minnesota Twins 2011 game broadcast

== Reception ==
The song was picked up quickly by a couple of alternative rock stations in the first week of availability. San Diego's 91x spun the song for the very first time on July 20, with Los Angeles' KROQ featuring the single on their First Listen blog a couple of days later.

It peaked at No. 5 on Billboard Alternative Songs, tying "Meant to Live" for Switchfoot's highest-charting single on that chart, and spent a total of 25 weeks on the tally. It was well received in the Christian radio scene as well, spending seven straight weeks at No. 1 on Billboard's Christian Rock songs chart.

== Live performances ==
Switchfoot performed the song on Jimmy Kimmel Live! on September 19, 2011, and on Conan on October 25, 2011.

== Charts ==
Chart (2011)	Peak Position
Canada Rock (Billboard)	42
US Bubbling Under Hot 100 Singles (Billboard)	13
US Christian Digital Songs (Billboard)	2
US Hot Rock & Alternative Songs (Billboard)	17
