= Twelve Gauge Valentine =

American post-hardcore band

- Also known as: TGV, 12 Gauge Valentine
- Origin: Bastrop and Monroe, Louisiana
- Genres: Christian metal, metalcore, Southern hardcore
- Years active: 2003–2008 (indefinite hiatus)
- Labels: Solid State, Sound VS. Silence
- Past members: Jon Green; Jonathan Cooper; Josh White; Josh Gross; Josh Fife; Kyle Snellenberger; Jake Campbell; Jonathan Webster; Michael Watson; Derek Thomas
- Website: Twelve Gauge Valentine on MySpace

Twelve Gauge Valentine was an American metalcore band from Bastrop and Monroe, Louisiana, with their debut album Shock Value released on October 3, 2006. The band was initially supported by the Sound Vs. Silence label, with whom they released their debut EP, Exclamationaire. They have toured with bands, such as Haste the Day, From Autumn to Ashes, It Dies Today, Alesana, War of Ages, Demise of Eros, Maylene and the Sons of Disaster, Inhale Exhale, Anam Cara, Vanna, Once Nothing, Gwen Stacy, Society's Finest, The Handshake Murders, and Memphis May Fire.

== History ==
=== Formation and first album (2003–2007) ===
The band formed under the original lineup of Jonathon Cooper on bass, Josh White on guitar, Josh Gross on guitar, Jonathon Webster on drums, and Jon Green on vocals. This lineup recorded the Exclamationaire album in 2005. In 2006 Josh Gross left and the band recorded Shock Value as a 4-piece with White doing both guitar tracks. Shortly after the release of this album another guitarist was added with no information given other than his name being Kyle Snellenberger. In the start of 2007 Kyle, Josh White, and Jonathon Webster parted from the band, and thus Josh Fife (Jon Green's younger brother) was brought on board as guitarist. New Orleans based Michael Watson replaced Webster, and Derek Thomas was put on second guitar. Shortly thereafter Florida based Jake Campbell had replaced Thomas. The band moved to Tampa Bay, Florida in Fall 2007 with plans to write a new album.

=== Current activity (2008–present) ===
In 2007 to 2008, Twelve Gauge Valentine performed their last tour along with The Handshake Murders and Memphis May Fire. As of 2008, Twelve Gauge Valentine has been inactive. While the band has never officially broken up or gone on hiatus, the band is no longer recording or touring together, and the band has been dropped from Solid State Records.

Band members have also begun to move on to other bands. In 2008, guitarist Jake Campbell joined Alesana, a post-hardcore band based out of Raleigh, North Carolina. And after moving back to Louisiana in June 2008, guitarist Josh Fife, former guitarist Kyle Snellenberger and original drummer Jonathon Webster formed a project together under the name Swamp Basstard. All band members appear under pseudonyms. Josh White has started his own solo project under the name The Josh Rocket.

It is unclear whether the band will ever return as Twelve Gauge Valentine, or if they will officially disband, nor is there any word as to the status of the second album the band was writing before becoming inactive.

== Influences ==
Twelve Gauge Valentine discussed their influences on their DVD via YouTube. Their influences were: Living Sacrifice, Luti-Kriss, Embodyment, Zao, Blindside, Rage Against the Machine, Glassjaw, Poison the Well, Converge and Every Time I Die.

== Members ==
Final Line-up

- Jon Green - vocals (2003–present)
- Jonathan Cooper - bass (2003–present)
- Jake Campbell - guitar (2007–present; Currently playing in Alesana, formerly of Sleeping Alone)
- Josh Fife - guitar (2007–present; Currently playing in Swamp Basstard and The Burning Issue formerly of Anam Cara)
- Michael "Milky" Watson - drums (2006–present)

Former Members

- Jonathan Webster - drums (2003–2006; Currently playing with Swamp Basstard)
- Josh "Rocket" White - guitar (2003–2006)
- Josh Gross - guitar (2003–2006)
- Kyle Snellenberger - guitar (2007; Currently playing with Swamp Basstard)
- Derek Thomas - guitar (2007; currently with The Greenery)

Timeline

== Discography ==
Other releases

- Demo (2003)
- Exclamationaire (2005)

Studio album

- Shock Value (2006)

Music videos

- "Ball & Chain" (2006)
