= Bury Me Alive (album) =

Studio album by Inhale Exhale
- Released: October 6, 2009
- Genres: Metalcore, alternative metal
- Length: 36:52
- Label: Solid State Records
- Producer: Travis Wyrick

Inhale Exhale chronology
I Swear (2008)	Bury Me Alive (2009)	Movement (2012)

Singles from Bury Me Alive
- 1. "Did You Ever Have A Touch To Lose?"

Professional ratings
Review scores
Source	Rating
Blistering	7/10 stars
Decoy Music	2/4 stars

Bury Me Alive is the third studio album by American metalcore band Inhale Exhale.

== Track listing ==
1. "Rooms" - 3:23
2. "Did You Ever Have A Touch To Lose?" - 3:12
3. "Condemned" - 3:50
4. "Over And Out" - 3:52
5. "A Dark Place For Your Mind To Be" - 4:12
6. "Intentions" - 3:52
7. "Explosions" - 3:56
8. "Fiction" - 3:54
9. "Better Her Than Me" - 3:31
10. "Thin Black Lines" - 2:02
11. "An Era" - 3:08

== Personnel ==
- Ryland Raus - Lead and backing vocals
- John LaRussa - Guitars
- Chris Carroll - Drums, percussion
- Greg Smith - Bass

Production

- Travis Wyrick - producer, engineering
- Mike Dearing - engineering
- Devin Townsend - mixing
- Troy Gelssner - mastering
- Ryan Clark (musician) - Design
