= Tanner Sparks =

American audio engineer, record producer, and musician

- Born: Tanner Lee Sparks; January 9, 1988 (age 38)
- Origin: La Mesa, California
- Genres: Post-hardcore, alternative rock, acoustic, metal
- Occupations: audio engineer, mix engineer, songwriter, musician, producer
- Instruments: guitar, acoustic guitar, bass, drums
- Years active: 1998–present
- Website: tannersparks.com

Tanner Sparks is an American audio engineer, mix engineer, record producer, and musician. Sparks has recorded multiple artists, including the double-platinum winning artist Switchfoot.

Sparks was the previous bassist for the band Destroy the Runner, guitarist for Chapter 14, and A Veil.

== Discography ==
With Destroy the Runner:

- "Sinners" – B-side song form Saints (2009, self released)
- I, Lucifer (2008 album, Solid State Records)

With Chapter 14:

- Like Trees in November (2010 EP, self released)
- "The Bad Shephard" (2012 single, self released)

With A Veil:

- The In Between (2012 album, self released)

=== Technical credits ===
Selected discography (mixing/engineering):

Year	Artist	Album
2019	Switchfoot	Native Tongue (Switchfoot album)
2016	Switchfoot	Where the Light Shines Through
2016	Weezer	Weezer (aka The White Album)
2015	Jon Foreman	The Wonderlands: Dawn
2015	Jon Foreman	The Wonderlands: Darkness
2015	Jon Foreman	The Wonderlands: Shadows
2015	Jon Foreman	The Wonderlands: Sunlight
2014	Switchfoot	The Edge of the Earth EP
2014	Switchfoot	Fading West (album)
2013	Switchfoot	Fading West (film)
2013	Switchfoot	Fading West EP
2012	A Veil	The In Between
2010	Chapter 14	Like Trees In November
