= Fading West =

Studio album by Switchfoot
- Released: January 14, 2014
- Recorded: 2012–13
- Studios: Spot X Studio, San Diego, CA
- Genres: Alternative rock, pop
- Length: 43:19
- Label: lowercase people/Atlantic
- Producers: Neal Avron, Jon Foreman, Tim Foreman

Switchfoot chronology
Fading West (EP) (2013)	Fading West (2014)	The Edge of the Earth (2014)

Singles from Fading West
- 1. "Who We Are" Released: September 17, 2013; 2. "Love Alone Is Worth the Fight" Released: September 17, 2013; 3. "Let It Out" Released: February 12, 2014; 4. "When We Come Alive" Released: May 13, 2014

Fading West is the ninth studio album by the American alternative rock band Switchfoot, released on January 14, 2014 through Atlantic. The album was promoted by four singles: "Who We Are" and "Love Alone Is Worth the Fight", released in September 2013, "Let It Out" released in February 2014, and "When We Come Alive", released in May 2014.

An accompanying film/documentary, Fading West, premiered on September 20, 2013 during the first concert of the Fading West Tour, and was released digitally on December 10, 2013. The film features a behind-the-scenes look at Switchfoot, and follows the band members to their surfing destinations.

== Recording ==
In an interview with Jake Denning, drummer Chad Butler said: "It's been interesting you know – typically a Switchfoot record will start with Jon [Foreman] and a guitar, then we'll build the framework of a song around that. But this time there's been a lot more space to have new experimentation, finding instruments in the locations we go – for instance, Drew [Shirley] finding a guitar on the side of the road in Africa made out of a gas can, being inspired by the unique sounds that it had. (...) I guess it's allowed us to start from the ground up, and let the sounds that we're finding exist without necessarily melody or a lyric yet, and just have a landscape of sound. (...) I think there's going to be room to breathe on the album that we haven't allowed ourselves in the past. You know, I think there's that cinematic idea in the back of your mind that you're creating something that doesn't have to be a 3 minute pop song."

According to Jon Foreman, the album will feature some Switchfoot friends, including his Fiction Family bandmate Sean Watkins and his sister Sara Watkins, saxophonist Karl Denson and Charlie Peacock (the co-producer of "Dare You to Move", who discovered Switchfoot and signed the band to its first record deal): "We want to just kind of pull on different people who play other instruments and can add colors to the score that we would never be able to add."

== Promotion ==
In December 2012, a tentative track listing for the album was posted by Switchfoot on Facebook and Twitter, saying "FadingWest soundtrack. Subject to change, like we all are..." In March 2013, a new tentative song list was posted onto Instagram by Jon Foreman. Another list, containing thirteen titles, was posted on Switchfoot's Twitter and Facebook pages on 5 June 2013.

The Fading West Tour, held to promote the album, started on 20 September 20, 2013 in St. Louis, Missouri, and will end on November 24, 2013 in Abilene, Texas. In each of 45 American cities, Switchfoot fans are going to see a special screening of the Fading West film, serving as the opening act for an intimate live show. In June 2013, tour dates were published on Switchfoot official website. Dates for other countries have not been announced yet.

The album was preceded by the Fading West EP, released on September 17, 2013. The EP contained three songs from the album, including "Who We Are" and "Love Alone Is Worth the Fight", which were released as radio singles to different formats that day. On September 18, 2013, a music video for "Who We Are" premiered on the Rolling Stone website. A video for "Love Alone Is Worth the Fight" was released on October 1, 2013. "When We Come Alive" was released as the third and final single to modern rock radio on May 13, 2014.

== Critical reception ==
Professional ratings
Aggregate scores
Source	Rating
Metacritic	71/100
Review scores
Source	Rating
AbsolutePunk	75%
Allmusic	4/5 stars
American Songwriter	2.5/5 stars
CCM Magazine	4/5 stars
Christian Broadcasting Network	4/5 spins
Cross Rhythms	10/10 squares
Indie Vision Music	4/5 stars
Jesus Freak Hideout	4.5/5 stars 4/5 stars
New Release Tuesday	4.5/5 stars
Slant Magazine	2.5/5 stars

Fading West garnered critical acclaim from seventeen music critics ratings and reviews; however, Metacritic reports that by using four selected independent ratings that the album has a weighted average Metascore of a 71 indicating "generally favorable" reviews. Matt Collar of Allmusic rated the album four stars, and highlighted that the release "is an upbeat, uplifting affair. The band [...] returns to both its musical roots and its beach and surf culture roots. The result is an album that at once pushes Switchfoot's sound forward, while displaying the band's long-running knack for melodic, catchy pop songs." He also noted that some of the tracks on the album, like "Slipping Away" and "Let It Out", "fit nicely alongside work by more contemporary bands like OneRepublic," and that the album "moves from earnest ballads to dancey, groove-oriented cuts to breezy, sunshine-soaked rockers with an easy, athletic flow." At CCM Magazine, Matt Conner rated the album four stars, and called it "the most fun and infectious Switchfoot album ever." Christian Broadcasting Network's Hannah Goodwyn rated the album four spins, believing that "Fading West continues to push Switchfoot across lines, genres and cultures." At Cross Rhythms, Mike Rimmer rated the album a perfect ten squares, writing that "It's the imagination, creativity and willingness not to simply retread previous triumphs that makes this one such a great album."

At AbsolutePunk, Craig Manning rated the album a 75-percent, and affirmed the album to be "a great success, simply because it's the most optimistic, invigorated, and downright happy these guys have sounded in years." Ian Zandi of Indie Vision Music rated the album four stars, and said this "should be considered [as] their passion project." At Jesus Freak Hideout, Ryan Barbee rated the album four-and-a-half stars, and vowed that the release "isn't the album of albums for Switchfoot, it is most definitely a solid record" that contains "some of the best songs the band has ever put out." Roger Gelwicks in a second staff opinion rated the release four stars, and wrote that it was "Fueled by the hope that comes with musical longevity," and it was "among the most credible works of its kind". At New Release Tuesday, Mary Nikkel rated the album four-and-a-half stars, and called this a "suitable sound" at this juncture of the group's history, which this stage comes in with the band showing they are "more full of vivacious energy, wide-eyed joy, and earnest hope than ever before." Rob Foster of Kill Your Stereo rated the album a 94-out-of-100, and noted that "The 11-track album is arguably the band's most eclectic, diverse collection yet."

Bert Saraco of The Phantom Tollbooth rated the album four-and-a-half tocks, stating that "Fading West in many ways sums up what Switchfoot is all about." Also, The Phantom Tollbooth's Michael Dalton rated the album three-and-a-half tocks, stating that "this has much more colour than the early and mid-period Switchfoot, but despite the fine production work, there are not as many great songs here as on either of the last two releases." Jono Davies of Louder Than the Music rated the album four-and-a-half stars, and evoked that "The music is true, memorable and appealing." At Christian Music Review, Amanda Brogan rated the album four stars, and noted that "Switchfoot delivers a new level of transparency, giving us a glimpse into their world while encouraging us in our own journeys." CM Addict's Kelcey Wixtrom rated the album four-and-a-half stars, and alluded to how the release was akin to a "long road of finding who you are, learning to love through fear, understanding forgiveness, and starting again." Joshua Andre of Christian Music Zine rated the album four-and-three-fourths out of five, stated that this "will be a classic in the years to come", and it does "seems to be the start of something special for the band."

However, Caleb Caldwell of Slant Magazine rated the album two-and-a-half stars, and noted that "Jon Foreman's ability to write hook-laden melodies remains, and he's an often poetic and perspicacious lyricist, but the themes of redemption and hope on Fading West are too abstracted, frequently degenerating into cliché". At American Songwriter, Hal Horowitz rated it likewise, and highlighted that "the bulk of these songs feature clichéd lyrics and arm-waving call and response construction".

== Commercial performance ==
Fading West sold 39,000 units in its first week of the release in the U.S., allowing it to debut at number six on the Billboard 200 chart, and thus become the band's highest-charting album since Nothing Is Sound (2005). Fading West also topped Billboard Christian Albums and Top Alternative Albums charts, and reached number two on the Rock Albums chart. As of June 2016, the album had sold 94,000 copies in the US.

The album also debuted at number 12 in Canada, and at number 50 in Australia, becoming the band's first album charting there since Nothing Is Sound. In Switzerland, it became Switchfoot's first album to ever chart, debuting at number 90. It also debuted at number 38 in New Zealand, and reached number 27 in its second week.

== Track listing ==
All tracks are written by Jon Foreman and Tim Foreman, except where noted.

No.	Title	Writer(s)	Length
1.	"Love Alone Is Worth the Fight"		4:35
2.	"Who We Are"		3:25
3.	"When We Come Alive"	J. Foreman, T. Foreman, Drew Pearson, David Hodges	3:38
4.	"Say It Like You Mean It"	J. Foreman, T. Foreman, Chad Butler	3:53
5.	"The World You Want"		4:18
6.	"Slipping Away"		3:35
7.	"Ba55"		4:45
8.	"Let It Out"	J. Foreman, T. Foreman, Pearson	3:17
9.	"All or Nothing at All"	J. Foreman, T. Foreman, Tim Pagnotta	3:46
10.	"Saltwater Heart"		4:04
11.	"Back to the Beginning Again"		4:21
Total length:			43:19

== Personnel ==
Switchfoot

- Jon Foreman – guitar, lead vocals, programming
- Tim Foreman – bass, backing vocals, cover design, programming
- Chad Butler – drums, percussion, programming
- Jerome Fontamillas – keyboard, guitar, backing vocals, programming
- Drew Shirley – guitar, backing vocals, programming

Additional personnel

- Mike Elizondo – programming, additional instrumentation
- Eric Owyoung – programming, additional instrumentation
- Josh Silverberg – additional instrumentation
- Jared Fox – additional instrumentation
- Blain Stark – additional instrumentation
- John Painter – additional instrumentation
- Brandon Zedaker – additional instrumentation, engineering
- Drew Pearson – additional instrumentation
- Sarah Masen – additional instrumentation

Technical personnel

- Neal Avron – production, programming, engineering, mixing
- Tanner Sparks – engineering
- Adam Hawkins – engineering
- Eric Robinson – engineering
- Ted Jensen – mastering
- Chris Burkard – photography
- Brian Nevins – photography
- Alan Van Gysen – photography

== Charts ==
Chart (2014)	Peak Position
Australian Albums (ARIA)	50
Canadian Albums (Billboard)	12
New Zealand Albums (RMNZ)	27
Swiss Albums (Schweizer Hitparade)	90
US Billboard 200	6
US Top Christian Albums (Billboard)	1
US Top Alternative Albums (Billboard)	1
US Top Rock Albums (Billboard)	2
US Indie Store Album Sales (Billboard)	19

Year-end charts

Chart (2014)	Position
US Alternative Albums (Billboard)	40
US Christian Albums (Billboard)	9
US Top Rock Albums (Billboard)	59
