= Like Trees in November =

EP by Chapter 14
- Released: November 30, 2010
- Genre: Rock, Progressive metal, Post-hardcore
- Length: 20:19

Like Trees in November is the debut release by Chapter 14. Like Trees in November is a five-song EP self-released on November 30, 2010.

== Track listing ==
No.	Title	Length
1.	"Winter"	3:26
2.	"Roses"	3:14
3.	"Wizard Of Gods"	3:41
4.	"Acts Aside From Action"	4:49
5.	"Moth & Rust (featuring Matt Geise)"	5:09
