= Vice Verses =

Studio album by Switchfoot
- Released: September 27, 2011
- Recorded: 2011
- Venue
- Studios: Spot X Studio, San Diego, CA
- Genres: Alternative rock; post-grunge; hard rock
- Length: 52:30
- Label: lowercase people records/Atlantic
- Producers: Neal Avron; Mike Elizondo (exec.)

Switchfoot chronology
Eastern Hymns for Western Shores (2010)	Vice Verses (2011)	Vice Re-Verses (2012)

Singles from Vice Verses
- 1. "Dark Horses" Released: August 2, 2011; 2. "Restless" Released: August 2011; 3. "Afterlife" Released: February 28, 2012; 4. "The Original" Released: September 11, 2012; 5. "Where I Belong" Released: December 31, 2012

Vice Verses is the eighth studio album by American alternative rock band Switchfoot. It was released on September 27, 2011. "Dark Horses" was the first single released from the album, with an August 2 radio date and digital release on the same day. Vice Verses debuted on the US Billboard 200 at number eight. "Afterlife" impacted radio on February 28, 2012. "The Original" impacted radio on September 11, 2012.

The song "Afterlife" was nominated for the 2013 GMA Dove Award in the category Rock/Contemporary Song of the Year.

As of November 2013, the album has sold 188,000 copies in the U.S.

== History ==
=== Background ===
The title track "Vice Verses" was first performed by Jon Foreman at an acoustic benefit show on April 12, 2009. Foreman iterated to the audience that the song was not slated for release on the upcoming Switchfoot record, Hello Hurricane, but would appear on the following record, saying "This isn't going to be on that record [Hello Hurricane], it's going to be on the next one... I think it's the title of the next one." On April 23, 2009, Switchfoot officially announced via Twitter that the album that would release following Hello Hurricane would be titled Vice Verses. This announcement came on the heels of a Twitter post in which the band said they had recorded four albums' worth of material during the Hurricane sessions and intended to release the records one by one. This plan was short-lived, however, with Foreman later stating that the band had "already replaced a lot the songs on Vice Verses with new songs" and that Vice Verses was a departure from Hello Hurricane.

In October 2009, Foreman said that most of the songs were ready to go and "if the next record came out today, it would be called Vice Verses." In December, bassist Tim Foreman was quoted saying that the album was nearly done and that he thought it was going to be even better than Hello Hurricane.

However, nothing more was heard about the project until July 2010, when Jon Foreman and guitarist Drew Shirley said the band was aiming to complete Vice Verses by the summer of 2011. On several occasions during the summer, the band stated that they were pushing for Vice Verses to be a double album, but they eventually decided to scale the project back down to a single disc collection.

During the Hello Hurricane tour, Switchfoot began debuting new songs that were candidates for inclusion on Vice Verses, for example in the summer 2010, the band played a song titled "Against the Voices", which Jon Foreman stated was "from the next record." On August 8, 2010, Switchfoot debuted a song titled "Dark Horses" at a show in Chicago. Foreman also played other new songs at his acoustic aftershows throughout the tour, including "Thrive" and "She Says (The Black Eyed Blues)". After the conclusion of the Hello Hurricane tour, the band members each took personal time off but very quickly resumed work on Vice Verses. On November 21, 2010, Shirley tweeted that the band were "tracking new songs in the studio tonight. You'll see..." while the next day, Foreman simply tweeted "making vice verses."

=== Recording ===
In January 2011, the band began the official recording for the project, announcing via email that they had enlisted Neal Avron and Mike Elizondo as producers for the album. Adam Hawkins, an engineer during the Hurricane sessions, was also brought in to work on Vice Verses. The decision to work with Avron was influenced by recommendations from other bands who have worked with him in the past. "Sean O'Donnell from Reeve Oliver, who's now in Yellowcard, [and] Jordan [Pundik] from New Found Glory [have talked up Avron]," explained Jon Foreman. "They're both just like, 'You gotta meet him, and you're going to work with him.' I'm really glad it worked out for both of our schedules to make a record together, it's been so much fun. I feel like everyone's pushed each other in a really good way."

On January 31, 2011, the band tweeted that bassist Tim Foreman was laying down bass tracks on a song titled "Selling the News". In February, a tentative track listing was posted on the web.

On April 6, 2011, the band tweeted that they were "going into the studio one last time to put the finishing touches" on Vice Verses, with final mixes to come later that week. Final mixing was completed on April 13, with band photographer Andy Barron tweeting that he was "watching the band sit in a dark room in hollywood listening to #viceverses front to back."

On April 9, 2011 Foreman debuted the Vice Verses song "Restless" during a live performance. During a two-week stint in Canada in May, the band began to debut more songs from the record. On May 18 at the London Convention Centre, the band debuted "Restless" live in its full-band arrangement. They played "The Original" for the first time in Kingston on the 20th, and a reworked version of "Dark Horses" on May 23 in Winnipeg, MB. Two more songs, "Afterlife" and "The War Inside" saw play during the tour as well. The band continued to preview their material throughout the summer months leading up to the album's release, offering fans a chance to hear the lead single, "Dark Horses" at their Bro-Am event, and some other tracks during a tent event at the Alive Festival on July 1.

The band premiered 11 of the 12 tracks on September 17, 2011 through ESPN Music commencing with the match between Oklahoma and Florida State.

== Musical and lyrical content ==
The thematic core of the feeling of the record rests in the idea of the polarity of life. This idea is rooted in the entire album, from the artwork to the lyrics, including the lyric "every blessing comes with a set of curses," found on the title track.

The band says that this record is different from their previous records in that it is driven more by the drums and bass, whereas their previous records were driven more by guitar. The music is rooted heavily in the rhythm section, consisting of Chad Butler's drum work and Tim Foreman's bass work, which the editor heard was a more "swampier" heavy metal sound.

Unlike the Hello Hurricane sessions, in which the band tracked over 80 songs, the Vice Verses session saw the band taking on a more selective process. Instead of writing multiple songs and picking from amongst them the best for the album, they wrote just enough songs for one album and focused them so as to perfect each one.

== Critical reception ==
Professional ratings
Review scores
Source	Rating
About.com	4.5/5 stars
Allmusic	3/5 stars
CCM Magazine	5/5 stars
Christianity Today	4/5 stars
Cross Rhythms	10/10 squares
HitFix	B
IGN	6.5/10
Louder Than the Music	5/5 stars
Melodic	4/5 stars
Seattle P-I	5/5 stars

Vice Verses garnered acclaim from music critics. At Christianity Today, Jeremy V. Jones rated it four stars, and wrote that "Vice Verses pounds out Switchfoot's evolving soundtrack for a messy yet grand spiritual journey." Ewan Jones of Cross Rhythms rated it a perfect ten squares, and called it "a rock album of the highest calibre." At CCM Magazine, Matt Conner rated it a perfect five stars, and noted that "Just as Good Monsters cemented Jars of Clay's greatness over a decade into a stellar career, so Vice Verses establishes Switchfoot in much the same way." Kim Jones of About.com rated it four-and-a-half stars, and felt that "Vice Verses offers fans reality wrapped in good music." At HitFix, Melinda Newman graded it a B, and evoked that "There's a faith that grounds 'Vice Verses,' but it's not a blind one by any means." Johan Wippsson of Melodic rated it four stars, and proclaimed that "once again a very good album with a perfect balance of beautiful melodies and alternative ideas where you will find new harmonies each listening."

At Jesus Freak Hideout, Roger Gelwicks rated it a perfect five stars, and praised the album for being "a significant achievement for Switchfoot and is, beyond a doubt, 2011's crowning tour de force." Founder, John DiBiase of Jesus Freak Hideout rated it a perfect five stars as well, and stated that he found the album to be "satisfying, exciting and consistently enjoyable from listen to listen". At New Release Tuesday, Marcus Hathcock rated it a perfect five stars, and called it "career defining material" because "The kind of gripping, moving, rocking art Switchfoot produces is difficult to find." Founder, Kevin McNeese rated it a perfect five stars, and affirmed that "Vice Verses is just as good as Hello Hurricane, my top pick a few years back, and it's great to continue to witness the latest surge of this incredible band."

Joshua Hedlund of Indie Vision Music rated it four stars, and said "This is the face of Switchfoot in a new decade." At The Phantom Tollbooth, Bert Saraco rated it four-and-a-half stars, and commented that "Angst never sounded so good." Derek Walker also of The Phantom Tollbooth rated it four-and-a-half stars, and stated that he even liked and preferred this to their greatest hit album, which he wrote "It looks like the next best-of should beat the first." At Worship Leader, Greg Wallace wrote that "Some of the music on Vice Verses actually hints at stepping up Switchfoot's already formidable intensity level." Chad Grischow of IGN rated it six-and-a-half, and he cautioned that the album felt like a "largely lifeless listen" because "more often than not Switchfoot feels like a worn out, uninterested band on their latest."

At Christian Music Zine, David Huey rated it four-and-a-half stars, and called it "solid front to back and a can’t miss." Jonathan Faulkner of Alt Rock Live rated it nine out of ten, and proclaimed that the band have exceeded themselves on the album, which he wrote that "Vice Verses is a stunning example as to the bands maturity over their nearly seventeen year career." At Louder Than the Music, Jono Davies rated it a perfect five stars, and he said "this is the most complete album the band have made." Kevin Thorson of CM Addict rated it four-and-a-half stars, and proclaimed the album to be "perfectly executed". At The Christian Manifesto, J.F. Arnold rated it four stars, and he evoked that "This album is my favorite Switchfoot album to date, though that admittedly isn't saying much." However, Allmusic's Matt Collar rated it three stars, and noted that the album come from a "creatively energized and committed state of mind that should please longtime fans and produce more than a few ear-catching moments."

== Track listing ==
Album release
No.	Title	Writer(s)	Length
1.	"Afterlife"	Jon Foreman, Tim Foreman	3:37
2.	"The Original"	J. Foreman, T. Foreman	3:15
3.	"The War Inside"	J. Foreman, T. Foreman	3:38
4.	"Restless"	J. Foreman	5:17
5.	"Blinding Light"	J. Foreman, T. Foreman	4:16
6.	"Selling the News"	J. Foreman	3:34
7.	"Thrive"	J. Foreman	5:12
8.	"Dark Horses"	J. Foreman, T. Foreman	3:59
9.	"Souvenirs"	J. Foreman, T. Foreman	4:31
10.	"Rise Above It"	J. Foreman	3:33
11.	"Vice Verses"	J. Foreman	5:07
12.	"Where I Belong"	J. Foreman, T. Foreman, Mike Elizondo	6:52

The deluxe edition of Vice Verses features the entire Hello Hurricane live.

Deluxe Edition: Hello Hurricane Live
No.	Title	Writer(s)	Length
13.	"Needle and Haystack Life"	Jon Foreman	5:25
14.	"Mess of Me"	Jon Foreman, Tim Foreman	4:52
15.	"Your Love Is a Song"	Jon Foreman, Mike Elizondo	5:35
16.	"The Sound (John M. Perkins' Blues)"	Jon Foreman, Tim Foreman	4:11
17.	"Enough to Let Me Go"	Jon Foreman, Tim Foreman	3:53
18.	"Free"	Jon Foreman	6:30
19.	"Hello Hurricane"	Jon Foreman, Tim Foreman	6:26
20.	"Always"	Jon Foreman	4:27
21.	"Bullet Soul"	Jon Foreman, Tim Foreman	4:31
22.	"Yet"	Jon Foreman, Tim Foreman	4:45
23.	"Sing It Out"	Jon Foreman, Tim Foreman	4:31
24.	"Red Eyes"	Jon Foreman, Tim Foreman	6:48

== Personnel ==
Switchfoot

- Jon Foreman – guitar, lead vocals
- Tim Foreman – bass, backing vocals
- Chad Butler – drums, percussion
- Jerome Fontamillas – keyboard, guitar, backing vocals
- Drew Shirley – guitar, backing vocals

Additional musicians

- John O'Brien – additional programming ("War Inside" and "Thrive")
- Sara Watkins – violin ("Restless")

Recorded at Spot X, San Diego.
Mixed at Paramount.
Mastered at Sterling Sound, New York City.

Additional personnel

- Neal Avron – production, mixing, engineering
- Mike Elizondo – executive producer
- Adam Hawkins – engineering
- Erich Talaba – engineering
- Ted Jensen – mastering
- Nicolas Fournier – assistant mix engineer
- Bruce Flohr – management, A&R
- David Levine – touring
- Pete Ganberg – A&R
- Anthony Delia – marketing
- Andy Barron – art direction and photography
- Michelle Piza – packaging manager

== Chart positions ==
Chart (2011)	Peak Position
New Zealand Albums Chart	35
US Billboard 200	8
Billboard Christian Albums	1
Billboard Rock Albums	3
Billboard Alternative Albums	3
Billboard Digital Albums	5

=== Year-end charts ===
Chart (2011)	Peak position
US Billboard Top Rock Albums	72
US Billboard Top Christian Albums	20
Chart (2012)	Peak position
US Billboard Top Christian Albums	19
