= Chapter 14 (band) =

American rock band

- Origin: San Diego, California, U.S.
- Genres: Rock, post-hardcore
- Years active: 2003–2007, 2010–present
- Members: Chad Ackerman; Tanner Sparks; Edwin Peraza; Jonathan Knauer
- Past members: Joel Piper; Eddie Hudson; Noah Slifka; Caylen Denuccio; Mike Catalano

Chapter 14 is an American post-hardcore/alternative rock band from Carlsbad, California, consisting of vocalist Chad Ackerman (Destroy the Runner, As I Lay Dying, Austrian Death Machine), guitarist Tanner Sparks (Destroy the Runner), bassist Edwin Peraza, and Jonathan Knauer on drums.

== History ==
Founded in 2003 by Ackerman and Sparks the band also consisted of drummer Mike Catalano (Chiodos, Destroy the Runner), guitarist Noah Slifka (In Fear and Faith) and bassist Eddie Hudson (Paper Mache). The band was unable to put together a full-length album but did complete two full U.S. tours and several demos without a label or financial backing.

After four years trying to land a record deal the band split up in 2007 when Ackerman and Sparks were offered the roles of vocalist and bassist for Destroy the Runner's departing Kyle Setter and Jeremiah Crespo respectively. Noah Slifka went on to join In Fear and Faith the same year while Mike Catalano would join back up with Ackerman and Sparks in Destroy the Runner in 2008. Eddie Hudson moved on to play bass for the band Paper Mache.

On May 16, 2010, Destroy the Runner announced they were going on an "indefinite hiatus." The same day Ackerman announced that he and Sparks would reform Chapter 14, and he invited the other members to rejoin.

Chapter 14 self-released an EP entitled Like Trees in November on November 30, 2010.

== Discography ==
=== EPs ===
- Like Trees In November (2010) (self released)
  1. "Winter"
  2. "Roses"
  3. "Wizard Of Gods"
  4. "Acts Aside From Action"
  5. "Moth and Rust (featuring Matt Geise)"

=== Singles ===
- "The Bad Shephard" (2011) (self released)

== Other sources ==
- Ryan's Rock Show. "Why Destroy The Runner Broke Up: Vocalist Chad Ackerman Tells All".
- Pure Volume. Chapter 14 @ Pure Volume
- San Diego Reader. Chapter 14 "We're Back, Full Throttle"
- Metal Underground. Chapter 14 "Like Trees In November"
