= Inhale Exhale =

American metalcore band (2005–2013)

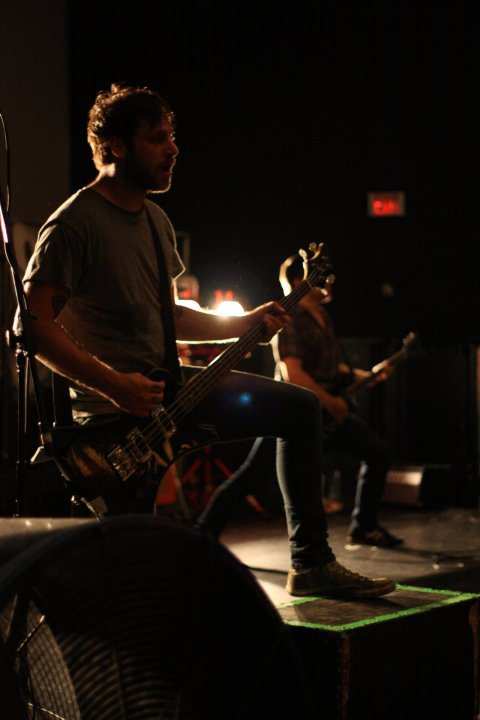
- Inhale Exhale performing at the Murray Hill Theater in June 2010

Background information
- Origin: Cleveland, Ohio, U.S.
- Genres: Metalcore, post-hardcore, alternative metal, nu metal (early)
- Years active: 2005–2013
- Labels: Red Cord, Solid State
- Past members: Ryland Raus; John LaRussa; Tony Saffell; Greg Smith; Chris Carroll; Bobby Poole II; Brian Pittman; Jeremy Gifford; Nick Brewer; Andy Levy

Inhale Exhale was an American metalcore band from Cleveland, Ohio. Formed in 2005 by guitarist John LaRussa and bassist Brian Pittman, the band released four studio albums, three with Solid State Records and one with Red Cord Records. They disbanded in 2013.

== History ==
The band was formed in 2005 by guitarist John LaRussa (former member of the band Narcissus) and bassist Brian Pittman (former member of the band Relient K). In 2006, they added vocalist Ryland Raus and Bobby Poole II on drums prior to the recording and release of their Solid State Records debut, The Lost. The Sick. The Sacred. They shot two videos for the album singles "A Call to the Faithful" and "Redemption", both of which appeared on Fuse's Top 20 Countdown and MTV's Headbangers Ball. The video for "A Call to the Faithful" was featured on the front page of Myspace at the time, and was one of the band's major hits with fans live and online. They were also featured in Revolver and Alternative Press.

The band hit the road right out of the gate of the release of their first album, touring with many acts such as August Burns Red, the Chariot, Maylene and the Sons of Disaster, Oh Sleeper, Project 86 and more. In July 2007, the band announced through a blog on Myspace that Brian Pittman was leaving for personal reasons: "After a lot of thought and consideration, Brian has decided to stay home. He will always have a place in Inhale Exhale, and we love him. But too many factors at home needed his attention. He is excited to be on a permanent break from music. He loves what he has done thus far in his career, but he needed to take care of some personal business."

The band went through a number of drummers; Bobby Poole II was with the band for the recording of The Lost. The Sick. The Sacred. and a few of the band's early tours. He was replaced on tour by Chris "Tank" Murk of Last Tuesday throughout their summer touring of 2007.

Inhale Exhale at Cornerstone Festival 2007

Before going into the studio in 2007 to record their second album I Swear..., the band chose Chris Carroll as their new permanent drummer. Jeremy Gifford replaced Brian Pittman on bass throughout the rest of the year, performing live and recording with the band, before leaving in 2008 and joining the band Lovedrug. A new bass player was never officially announced, but Greg Smith was eventually confirmed as bassist. On June 10, 2008, the band released their second album, I Swear... for Solid State Records with the lead single "It's Myself vs Being A Man", which was their most downloaded single, and was featured on MTV, Fuse, DirecTV, MTV2 and many other outlets. They were featured in Alternative Press, Revolver, Decibel, Outburn, and Kerrang!. In support of the album, they toured with such artists as Haste the Day, Emarosa, Dead and Divine, the Showdown, War of Ages, Becoming the Archetype, A Plea for Purging, Sky Eats Airplane and more.

It was announced on the band's MySpace page on May 12, 2009, that they were working on new material and would be recording during the summer to release their next studio album in the fall. In the middle of July, the band confirmed that their next album would be called Bury Me Alive. On September 15, Inhale Exhale posted a new song on their MySpace page, and on October 6, Bury Me Alive was released. They shot a video for the single "Did You Ever Have A Touch To Lose?" which had an exclusive release via Noisecreep. They did extensive touring for the album with bands such as Miss May I, I Wrestled A Bear Once, the Color Morale, Memphis May Fire, the Chariot, This or the Apocalypse, Demon Hunter, Gwen Stacy, the Browning, Sleeping Giant, Greeley Estates and more, along with a good amount of spot dates and runs. They were also featured in Alternative Press, Revolver, and other music media outlets. On February 24, 2011, the band announced that they had left Solid State Records and have become an independent band once again. On March 30, 2012, they announced that the band had signed to Red Cord Records for a two-album contract.

The band's fourth album, Movement, was released October 9, 2012, along with a month-long tour of Europe including Germany, Netherlands, Austria, Poland, Ukraine, Czech Republic, and more. They had an exclusive stream via Revolver for the song "Carpe Diem", along with a follow-up feature and interview in Revolver's December 2012 issue, in which the band went into some detail on the recording process, and how they went into it wanting a raw album rather than the cookie-cutter, overproduced material other bands were putting out. The band did not announce a U.S. tour to follow their Europe tour beside some festival dates.

On June 2, 2013, Inhale Exhale announced on their Facebook page that they were breaking up: "As of right now, after touring 10+ countries, releasing four studio albums internationally, and shooting videos and singles and all that goes along with being in this band, Inhale Exhale is coming to an end." They performed at the Alliance Festival on August 4, 2013, in Pittsburgh, Pennsylvania alongside Demon Hunter, the Red Jumpsuit Apparatus, and others. They played their final show in Canton, Ohio on October 19, 2013.

== Band members ==
Final members

- John LaRussa – guitar (2005–2013)
- Ryland Raus – lead vocals (2006–2013)
- Nick Brewer – bass (2012–2013)
- Tony Saffell – drums (2010–2013)

Former members

- Nick Brewer – drums (2005–2006), bass (2012–2013)
- Andy Levy – lead vocals (2005–2006)
- Brian Pittman – bass (2005–2007)
- Bobby Poole II – drums, backing vocals (2006–2007)
- Jeremy Gifford – bass (2007–2008)
- Chris "Gator" Carroll – drums (2007–2009)

Former touring musicians

- Chris "Tank" Murk – drums (2007)

== Discography ==
=== Albums ===
Title	Release date	Label(s)
The Lost. The Sick. The Sacred.	November 21, 2006	Solid State Records
I Swear...	June 10, 2008	Solid State Records
Bury Me Alive	October 6, 2009	Solid State Records
Movement	October 9, 2012	Red Cord Records

=== Music videos ===
- "Redemption" (The Lost. The Sick. The Sacred., 2006)
- "A Call to the Faithful" (The Lost. The Sick. The Sacred., 2007)
- "It's Myself Vs. Being A Man" (I Swear..., 2008)
- "Did You Ever Have a Touch to Lose?" (Bury Me Alive, 2009)
- "Low" (Movement, 2012)
