= Fading West (film) =

- Directed by: Matt Katsolis
- Starring: Jon Foreman; Tim Foreman; Chad Butler; Jerome Fontamillas; Drew Shirley
- Cinematography: Nic McLean; Russell Brownley
- Music by: Switchfoot
- Production company: Interpret Studios
- Release date: December 10, 2013
- Running time: 84 min
- Country: United States
- Language: English

Fading West is a 2013 documentary film, shot during Switchfoot's 2012 World Tour, directed by Matt Katsolis of Interpret Studios. It follows the band to locations around the world, including the U.S., South Africa, Bali, Australia and New Zealand. In the official press release, it was described as "part rock documentary, part surf film, and part travelogue."

In January 2013, Switchfoot released a teaser for Fading West. A new, extended trailer for the film was released onto YouTube on June 24, 2013. The film was released digitally on December 10, 2013.

== Background ==
"We’ve been talking about doing this for years now and it came to the point where we were finally like, are we going to do this thing or not? If so, let’s make it happen.", said Switchfoot's bassist Tim Foreman about the project.

In an interview with Billboard magazine, Jon Foreman said: "Our goal was always to be professional surfers -- and I'm only partially kidding when I say that -- and if nobody is gonna make a movie about us, let's do it ourselves. We love surfing, so this was kind of a chance to introduce that to the rest of the world and maybe connect a few of the dots to the music as well. (...) It's about rock 'n' roll and the journey we've been on for the past eight albums. There's a lot of special moments in the film."

In an exclusive interview with Land of Broken Hearts, Katsolis said his hope was "that the audience who already knows Switchfoot sees a new level of depth to the band that they have never had access to before." The film crew consisted of only five people, who had multiple tasks.

== Cast ==
- Jon Foreman as Himself
- Tim Foreman as Himself
- Chad Butler as Himself
- Jerome Fontamillas as Himself
- Drew Shirley as Himself
- Rob Machado as Himself
- Tom Curren as Himself

== Release ==
Although the film was initially planned to premiere at the 2013 Bro-Am in July, only a sneak peek of it was shown there. The film officially premiered on July 31, 2013, at LA X Games. However, Switchfoot fans were first able to watch it during the first concert of the Fading West Tour, on September 20, 2013, in St. Louis.

As of June 2013, the film was believed to be released on DVD/Blu-ray in December 2013/January 2014, after the Fading West Tour's end, and to be streaming on Hulu and Netflix. However, in August 2013 it was announced that it would be released digitally in early December 2013, and it wasn't clear whether it would ever be released in a physical format, such as DVD or Blu-ray.

On December 10, 2013, the film was released to digital retailers and video on demand services, such as iTunes, Amazon Video, Vudu and CinemaNow, among others. To promote the release, a special fadingwest.tv website was launched.

On September 9, 2014, Switchfoot released an extended play The Edge of the Earth, containing previously unreleased songs from the film.

== See also ==
- Fading West
- Fading West Tour
- The Edge of the Earth
