= Take Me (Korn song) =

Single by Korn

from the album The Serenity of Suffering
- Released: November 1, 2016
- Genre: Nu metal
- Length: 3:00
- Label: Roadrunner
- Songwriters: Jonathan Davis; James Shaffer; Brian Welch; Reginald Arvizu; Ray Luzier
- Producer: Nick Raskulinecz

Korn singles chronology
"Insane" (2016)	"Take Me" (2016)	"Black Is the Soul" (2017)

Music video
- "Take Me" on YouTube

"Take Me" is a song by American nu metal band Korn. It was released on November 1, 2016, as the second single from their twelfth studio album, The Serenity of Suffering (2016). "Take Me" peaked at No. 2 on Billboard's Mainstream Rock chart in April 2017.

== Background ==
The song was first released for streaming on October 11, 2016, two weeks ahead of the release of its respective album, The Serenity of Suffering. It was the second single released from the album, after "Rotting in Vain". The song was originally written by Jonathan Davis for his then in the works debut solo album, but after handing it to Munky and Head, the song was re-worked into a Korn song.

== Themes and composition ==
The song's lyrics are about addiction, specifically substance abuse. According to the song's writer, frontman Jonathan Davis, the song is actually written from the perspective of the drug itself, being inspired by Brad Paisley's personification of alcohol in his 2005 single "Alcohol", and other older country music songs that touched on the subject. Loudwire interpreted the song's sound and structure to represent the effects of drugs and alcohol as well, stating that the melodic, soaring chorus represented the initial substance intoxication, while the jarring guitar riffing in the bridge represented the later jarring comedown. The song has been described as metal music, specifically nu metal.

The song is about Davis working through his own past issues with substance abuse and addiction, something the band's music video also touched on. The video involves Davis, secluded in the lab, going through addiction and withdrawal issues while the band watches, but is unable to interact with him. The video, released on October 26, 2016, was directed by Andrew Baird, who described the music video as:

It's like trying to visualise a feeling and a mood of going through the final stages of addiction, detox and surrender. It's very symbolic and open to interpretation. It's Jonathan's experiences with the substance and we flick back and forth between how the substance abuse and addiction affects the person."

The music video was described as looking as if it were something from a grunge band in the 1990s.

== Reception ==
Metal Injection called the song the best of the singles from The Serenity of Suffering, stating that "The riffs are oh-so nu-metal, but there's almost no way you can avoid at least bobbing your head to them. The chorus isn't half bad, but I think the real star of the track are the guitars this time around. Who knew we'd be saying that about Korn in 2016."

== Personnel ==
- Jonathan Davis – vocals
- James "Munky" Shaffer – guitars
- Brian "Head" Welch – guitars
- Reginald "Fieldy" Arvizu – bass
- Ray Luzier – drums

== Charts ==
Chart (2017)	Peak position
Czech Republic Rock (IFPI)	5
US Hot Rock & Alternative Songs (Billboard)	42
US Rock & Alternative Airplay (Billboard)	18
