= Datsik discography =

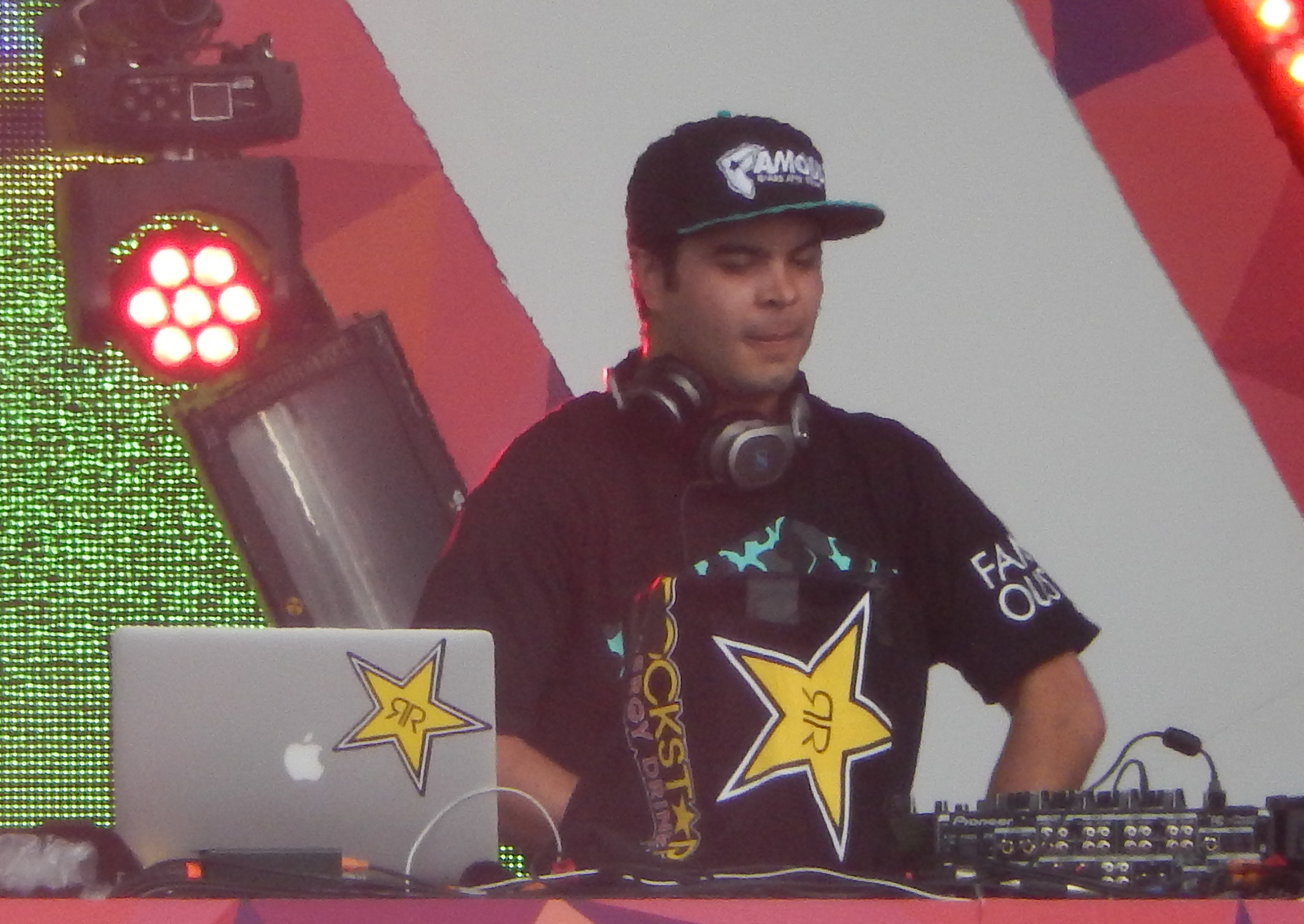
Datsik at Spring Awakening in 2014

This is the discography for Canadian electronic music producer Datsik.

== Studio albums ==
Title	Details
Vitamin D	Released: April 10, 2012; Label: Dim Mak; Format: Digital download, CD
Let It Burn LP	Released: September 24, 2013; Format: Digital download, CD
Afterlife LP	Released (Pre Singles): August 9, 2020; Released (Full Album): April 6, 2023; Label: Higher Power; Format: Digital Download
Mari Manzil	Released (Full Album): March 28, 2024; Label: S4 Studio; Format: Digital Download

== Extended plays ==
Title	Details	Peak chart positions	
Title	Details	US Dance	US Heat
Nuke 'Em (with Flux Pavilion, Tom Encore and Redline)	Released: April 21, 2009; Label: Rottun Recordings; Format: Digital download, CD	—	—
Boom (with Excision and Flux Pavilion)	Released: June 15, 2009; Label: Rottun Recordings; Format: Digital download, CD	—	—
Eradicate (with Chaosphere)	Released: July 18, 2011; Label: Rottun Recordings; Format: Digital download, CD	—	—
Cold Blooded	Released: January 22, 2013; Label: Firepower Records; Format: Digital download, CD	—	—
Crazy (with Subvert and Fat Pat)	Released: November 21, 2011; Label: Rottun Recordings; Format: Digital download, CD	—	—
Internet Streets (with Barely Alive)	Released: May 27, 2014; Label: Firepower Records & Disciple Recordings; Format: Digital download, CD	—	—
Down 4 My Ninjas	Released: November 25, 2014; Label: Firepower Records; Format: Digital download, CD	—	—
Darkstar	Released: March 25, 2016; Label: Firepower Records; Format: Digital download, CD	6	—
Sensei	Released: December 16, 2016; Label: Firepower Records; Format: Digital download, CD	8	17
Master of Shadows	Released: January 12, 2018; Label: Firepower Records; Format: Digital download, CD		

== Singles ==
Title	Year
"Swagga" (with Excision)	2009
"Invaderz" (with Excision)	2009
"Galvanize"	2009
"Texx Mars"	2009
"Gizmo"	2009
"Gecko"	2009
"3 Fist Style"	2010
"King Kong" (with Bare)	2011
"Hydraulic"	2011
"Overdose"	2011
"Firepower"	2011
"Domino"	2011
"Pick Your Poison" (with Diplo featuring Kay)	2011
"Fully Blown" (featuring Snak the Ripper)	2012
"Lightspeed" (with Kill the Noise)	2012
"Evilution" (with Infected Mushroom featuring Jonathan Davis)	2012
"Vindicate" (with Excision)	2013
"Light the Fuse"	2013
"Wickedest Wobble" (with Bryx)	2014
"The Blastaz" (with Barely Alive)	2015
"When They Drop" (with Twine)	2015
"Smoke Bomb" (featuring Snoop Dogg)	2015
"Monster" (with Jayceeoh and Redman)	2017
"Warriors of the Night" (with Virtual Riot)	2017
"Pressure Plates"	2017
"Cancelled"	2020
"Kira"	2020
"Mental Health"	2020
"In The Dark"	2020

== Remixes ==
=== 2009 ===
- Wu-Tang Clan — "Biochemical Equation" (Datsik & Excision Remix)
- Ctrl Z vs. Freestylers featuring Navigator — "Ruffneck '09" (Excision & Datsik Remix)
- Ivory — "Hand Grenade" (Excision & Datsik Dubstep Remix)
- Nobuo Uematsu — "Jenova Project" (Datsik Remix)

=== 2010 ===
- Apex — "Nowhere to Run" (Datsik & Excision Remix)
- The Crystal Method featuring LMFAO — "Sine Language" (Datsik Remix)
- Don Diablo featuring Dragonette — "Animale" (Datsik Remix)
- Diplo featuring Lil Jon — "U Don't Like Me" (Datsik Remix)
- Noisia — "Alpha Centauri" (Excision & Datsik Remix)
- Kelly Dean & Steady featuring Kemst — "Teflon" (Excision & Datsik Remix)
- Coldplay — "Fix You" (Datsik Remix)
- MGMT — "Kids" (Datsik Remix)
- Lil Wayne — "A Milli" (Excision & Datsik Remix)

=== 2011 ===
- Bassnectar — "Boombox" (Datsik Remix)
- Steve Aoki & Sidney Samson — "Wake Up Call" (Datsik Remix)

=== 2012 ===
- Foreign Beggars featuring Black Sun Empire — "Solace One" (Datsik Remix)
- Zedd — "Stars Come Out" (Datsik Remix)
- Kaskade & Skrillex — "Lick It" (Datsik Remix)
- DJ Fresh featuring Dizzee Rascal — "The Power" (Datsik Remix)
- Dada Life — "Kick Out The Epic Motherf***er" (Datsik Remix)
- Colin Munroe featuring K.Flay - "Your Eyes" (Datsik Remix)

=== 2013 ===
- Linkin Park — "Until It Breaks" (Datsik Remix)
- Example — "Perfect Replacement" (Datsik Remix)
- Pretty Lights featuring Talib Kweli — "Around the Block" (Datsik Remix)
- Doctor P & Adam F featuring Method Man - "The Pit" (Datsik Remix)

=== 2014 ===
- Excision & Far Too Loud — "Destroid 8 Annihilate" (Datsik Remix)
- Lana Del Rey — "Ultraviolence" (Datsik Remix)

== Appears On ==
- An-Ten-Nae Presents: Acid Crunk Vol. 2 (Muti Music, October 26, 2009)
- Downlink — Ignition EP (Rottun Recordings, November 18, 2009)
- Elite Force — Revamped (U&A Recordings, March 8, 2010)
- Skins (2011)
- Chaosphere — Eradicate EP (Rottun Recordings, May 16, 2011)
- No Strings Attached EP (Circus Records, August 15, 2011)
- deadmau5 — Meowingtons Hax Tour Trax (Mau5trap, August 25, 2011)
- Excision — X Rated (Mau5trap, September 12, 2011)
- Subvert — Crazy EP (Rottun Recordings, October 3, 2011)
- Korn — The Path of Totality (Roadrunner Records, December 6, 2011)
- Diplo — Express Yourself EP (Mad Decent, June 12, 2012)
- Truth — Evil In The Woods EP (Smog, November 20, 2012)
- Saints Row IV (2013)
- Getter — I Want More LP (Firepower Records, February 5, 2013)
- Protohype — Speak No Evil EP (Firepower Records, October 22, 2013)
- Linkin Park — Recharged (Warner Bros. Records, October 29, 2013)
- Bar9 — Brave New World EP (Never Say Die Records, December 2, 2013)
- DKS — Deep End EP (Firepower Records, December 3, 2013)
- Getter — Thriller EP (Firepower Records, December 17, 2013)
- Barely Alive — Internet Streets EP (Disciple Recordings & Firepower Records, May 26, 2014)
- Bear Grillz — Bear Grillz & Friends, Vol. 1 (Firepower Records, August 5, 2014)
- Protohype — Encore (Firepower Records, August 19, 2014)
- Bear Grillz — The Unbearable EP (Firepower Records, January 27, 2015)
- Protohype — Puppy Crew EP (Firepower Records, April 8, 2015)
