= Black Is the Soul =

Single by Korn

from the album The Serenity of Suffering
- Released: June 7, 2017
- Recorded: 2016
- Genre: Nu metal; hard rock
- Length: 4:01
- Label: Roadrunner
- Songwriters: Jonathan Davis; James Shaffer; Brian Welch; Reginald Arvizu; Ray Luzier
- Producer: Nick Raskulinecz

Korn singles chronology
"Take Me" (2016)	"Black Is the Soul" (2017)	"You'll Never Find Me" (2019)

Music video
- "Black Is the Soul" on YouTube

"Black Is the Soul" is a song by American nu metal band Korn. It was their third single off of their twelfth studio album The Serenity of Suffering. It peaked at number 10 on the Billboard US Mainstream Rock Songs chart in November 2017.

== Background ==
On June 4, 2017, the band released a cryptic teaser video to social media about an upcoming single and music video by the band, with journalists noting that viewers were speculating it was in reference to the track "Black Is the Soul". The clip featured footage of the band, alongside a faceless woman. This was confirmed three days later, when the music video was released and was announced as the third single from the band's twelfth album, The Serenity of Suffering. The video features alternating footage of the band performing and the faceless woman, wading through water and searching around numerous lifeless mannequins. The woman searches through mannequin body parts in the water, and video culminates with body parts flying around and coming together to reform the woman's face.

== Themes and composition ==
Lyrically, frontman Jonathan Davis stated that the band is "being pulled away from the right path...and trying to navigate those conflicting emotions", something he said the music video was also trying to metaphorically illustrate. The song was one of the first written for The Serenity of Suffering album, initially conceived under the working title of "Mary Ellen Thrash", after guitarist's Brian Welch's mother Mary Ellen due to it being written on her birthday. The name was changed to "Black Is the Soul" later on, something Welch conceded was "creepy" to name a song that was about his own mother, but was kept due his strong feelings towards the song's line of "Black is the soul that's led astray".

The song was described as having the heavy, de-tuned guitar sound commonly found in nu metal.

== Reception ==
Loudwire named the song the 13th best hard rock song of 2017.

== Personnel ==
- Jonathan Davis – lead vocals
- James "Munky" Shaffer – guitars
- Brian "Head" Welch – guitars
- Reginald "Fieldy" Arvizu – bass
- Ray Luzier – drums

== Charts ==
Chart (2017)	Peak position
US Rock & Alternative Airplay (Billboard)	34
