= Ephwurd =

American electronic music project

- Genres: House, bass house
- Years active: 2015–2021
- Labels: Eph'd Up; Musical Freedom; Spinnin'
- Members: Bais Haus
- Past members: Datsik
- Website: www.ephwurd.com

Ephwurd was an American electronic music project. Ephwurd is best known for tracks such as "Rock the Party" (with Jauz), "Vibrations", "Wildchild" (with the Bloody Beetroots) and "Just Us" (featuring Liinks). In addition, Ephwurd has remixed some of the biggest names in dance music including the Chainsmokers, Major Lazer, DJ Snake and Oliver Heldens. Ephwurd has toured worldwide playing festivals such as Lollapalooza, Electric Daisy Carnival and Veld, among many others.

== History ==
Ephwurd went public with a remix of Major Lazer & DJ Snake's "Lean On", before revealing who was behind the duo in July 2015 as they released the single "Rock the Party" on the Spinnin' Records label. The collaborative effort between Ephwurd and Jauz would often get played by DJs such as Tiësto, Axwell Λ Ingrosso, and Skrillex. The music style would later be known as "bass house", which has been described as "having a lot of classic house drums and percussion to it but it has the wobbles of dubstep at the same time".

Ephwurd later released a slew of singles on labels such as Spinnin Records and its sub label affiliates.

On March 16, 2018, Bais Haus announced that "Ephwurd will now operate without Datsik.", due in part to the controversy surrounding Datsik.

Since moving on as a solo act Ephwurd has released many singles and collaborations such as "Accelerator" and "Wildchild" (with the Bloody Beetroots).

In February 2019, Ephwurd has developed his Eph'd Up Records label releasing emerging artists in the "bass house" genre.

== Music style ==
Ephwurd was one of the first acts to popularize the "bass house" genre of music to a wider audience. Bass house has been described as an " all-encompassing melting pot is so broad it’s impossible to define what it is". The origins of bass house has been traced back to the mid to late-1990s with the work of the group Basement Jaxx that was melded into UK garage over time. One reviewer labelled Ephwurd as a "high-flying collaboration of epic proportions", describing the music as "an exciting blend of dubstep and house music that has packed out venues around the world." Ashley Marro of "Stoney Road" magazine described Ephwurd's Bring It Back as being an "old school combining a heavy dose of bass with elements of classic house music".
