= Insane (Korn song) =

2016 single by Korn

Promotional single by Korn

from the album The Serenity of Suffering
- Released: August 21, 2016
- Recorded: 2016
- Genre: Nu metal
- Length: 3:50
- Label: Roadrunner
- Songwriters: Jonathan Davis; James Shaffer; Brian Welch; Reginald Arvizu; Ray Luzier
- Producer: Nick Raskulinecz

Korn singles chronology
"Rotting in Vain" (2016)	"Insane" (2016)	"Take Me" (2016)

Music video
- "Insane" on YouTube

"Insane" is a song by American nu metal band Korn. It was released as a promotional single from their twelfth studio album The Serenity of Suffering.

== Background ==
Insane was released alongside an accompanying music video, directed by Ryan Valdez, based around the concept of memento mori. Scenes featured in the video involve a deceased head coming back to life as a photographer, with an alleged "demonic camera", prepares to capture it.

== Themes and composition ==
"The song Insane is another chapter in my fucking crazy life. It’s about watching things happen and fall apart around me, and there’s nothing I can do about it. I’ve got to the point I don’t relate with anyone that’s normal anymore. I can only relate to people who are going through insanity, or there’s something wrong with them. That’s how I deal. I wrote the lyrics and I looked at them like, ‘What the hell does this mean?’ I just fit with the vibe of the song. It's one of the heaviest songs on the record. I love it." - Davis

The song has been compared to some of Korn's earlier material.

== Personnel ==
Korn

- Jonathan Davis – lead vocals
- James "Munky" Shaffer – guitars
- Brian "Head" Welch – guitars
- Reginald "Fieldy" Arvizu – bass
- Ray Luzier – drums

Additional personnel

- C-Minus – turntables

== Charts ==
Chart (2016)	Peak position
US Hot Rock & Alternative Songs (Billboard)	37
