= The Serenity of Suffering =

Studio album by Korn
- Released: October 21, 2016
- Recorded: 2015–2016
- Studio: Rock Falcon Studio, Nashville, Tennessee; Buck Owens Studio, Bakersfield, California; Steakhouse Studios, North Hollywood, Los Angeles
- Genre: Nu metal; alternative metal
- Length: 40:34
- Label: Roadrunner
- Producer: Nick Raskulinecz

Korn chronology
The Paradigm Shift (2013)	The Serenity of Suffering (2016)	The Nothing (2019)

Singles from The Serenity of Suffering
- 1. "Rotting in Vain" Released: July 22, 2016; 2. "Take Me" Released: November 1, 2016; 3. "Black Is the Soul" Released: June 7, 2017; 4. "Insane" Released: August 21, 2016; 5. "A Different World" Released: October 21, 2016

The Serenity of Suffering is the twelfth studio album by American nu metal band Korn. It was released on October 21, 2016. According to guitarist Brian Welch, it is "heavier than anyone's heard us in a long time" and it contains their most intense vocals and music in recent times.

== Background ==
The band began working on their follow up to The Paradigm Shift in 2015, with Head claiming that it would be "heavier than anyone's heard [us] in a long time". It's the first album to feature significant songwriting contributions from Head since he rejoined the band in 2013. The song "Take Me" was originally written by Jonathan Davis for his debut solo album, but after hearing it, the rest of Korn re-wrote the track and decided to include it on The Serenity of Suffering.

The artwork includes the stuffed toy from Korn's fourth album, Issues, and was created by Ron English.

== Commercial performance ==
The Serenity of Suffering debuted at number 4 on the US Billboard 200 with 57,000 units, 55,000 of which were pure album sales. As of December 2017, the album has sold 133,000 copies in the US.

== Reception ==
Professional ratings
Aggregate scores
Source	Rating
Metacritic	67/100
Review scores
Source	Rating
AllMusic	4/5 stars
Classic Rock (GER)	3.5/5 stars 4/5 stars
Cross Rhythms	8/10 squares
Exclaim!	6/10
The Guardian	4/5 stars
Metal Hammer	4/5 stars
Metal Injection	8.5/10
Rock Sound	7/10
Rolling Stone	2.5/5 stars
Sputnikmusic	3.8/5

According to the review aggregator Metacritic, The Serenity of Suffering received "generally favorable reviews" based on a weighted average score of 67 out of 100 from 9 critic scores.

AllMusic wrote: "Without pandering to career-peak nostalgia, Korn deftly execute all the hallmarks that have come to define their sound", calling it "one of their best albums". Metal Hammer wrote: "The Serenity of Suffering is like a selection box of Korn's defining moments."

A less favorable review came from Rolling Stone, writing: "Suffering is heavy enough to stand proudly in the Korn kanon, but not daring enough to be much else."

== Track listing ==
All tracks are written by Korn.

No.	Title	Length
1.	"Insane"	3:50
2.	"Rotting in Vain"	3:33
3.	"Black Is the Soul"	4:01
4.	"The Hating"	4:22
5.	"A Different World" (featuring Corey Taylor)	3:20
6.	"Take Me"	3:00
7.	"Everything Falls Apart"	4:17
8.	"Die Yet Another Night"	4:28
9.	"When You're Not There"	3:24
10.	"Next in Line"	3:28
11.	"Please Come for Me"	2:53
Total length:		40:36

European/UK/New Zealand/Japanese Deluxe edition bonus tracks
No.	Title	Length
12.	"Baby"	4:55
13.	"Calling Me Too Soon"	3:23
Total length:		48:54

Japanese edition bonus track
No.	Title	Length
14.	"Out of You"	3:29
Total length:		52:23

== Personnel ==
Korn

- Jonathan Davis – lead vocals
- James "Munky" Shaffer – guitars, backing vocals
- Brian "Head" Welch – guitars, backing vocals
- Reginald "Fieldy" Arvizu – bass
- Ray Luzier – drums

Additional musicians

- Corey Taylor – guest vocals on "A Different World"
- Zac Baird – keyboards on "Take Me"
- Jules Venturini – programming
- Nick "Sluggo" Suddarth – programming
- Rick Norris – additional programming
- C-Minus – turntables on "Insane", "A Different World", "Next in Line", and "Calling Me Too Soon"

Production

- Nick Raskulinecz – production
- Josh Wilbur – mixing, mastering
- Nathan Yarborough – engineering
- Chris Collier – additional engineering
- Paul Suarez – assistant mix engineering
- Justin Warfield – additional vocal arrangement
- Dave Rath – A&R
- Ron English – illustrations
- Virgilio Tzaj – art direction, design

== Charts ==
=== Weekly charts ===
Chart (2016)	Peak position
Australian Albums (ARIA)	5
Austrian Albums (Ö3 Austria)	6
Belgian Albums (Ultratop Flanders)	16
Belgian Albums (Ultratop Wallonia)	14
Canadian Albums (Billboard)	7
Czech Albums (ČNS IFPI)	5
Danish Vinyl Albums (Hitlisten)	25
Dutch Albums (Album Top 100)	27
Finnish Albums (Suomen virallinen lista)	8
French Albums (SNEP)	20
German Albums (Offizielle Top 100)	3
Hungarian Albums (MAHASZ)	7
Irish Albums (IRMA)	24
Italian Albums (FIMI)	15
Japanese Albums (Oricon)	19
New Zealand Albums (RMNZ)	9
Polish Albums (ZPAV)	19
Portuguese Albums (AFP)	11
Scottish Albums (Official Charts)	10
Slovak Albums (ČNS IFPI)	10
Spanish Albums (PROMUSICAE)	42
Swedish Albums (Sverigetopplistan)	23
Swiss Albums (Schweizer Hitparade)	6
UK Albums (Official Charts)	9
UK Rock & Metal Albums (OCC)	1
US Billboard 200	4
US Top Alternative Albums (Billboard)	1
US Top Hard Rock Albums (Billboard)	1
US Top Rock Albums (Billboard)	1

=== Year-end charts ===
Chart (2016–17)	Position
US Top Rock Albums (Billboard)	45
US Hard Rock Albums (Billboard)	15
US Hard Rock Albums (Billboard)	42
