= What It Is =

What It Is may refer to:

== Music ==
=== Album ===
- What It Is (Boogaloo Joe Jones album) or the title track, 1971
- What It Is (Hayes Carll album) or the title song, 2019
- What It Is (Jacky Terrasson album), 1999
- What It Is (Mal Waldron album) or the title track, 1981
- What It Is (PSD album) or the title song, 1999
- What It Is!, by Kahil El'Zabar, or the title track, 2013
- What It Is? Ed Blackwell Project Vol. 1, 1993
- What It Is, by Cordelia's Dad, 2002
- What It Is! Funky Soul and Rare Grooves, a box set by various artists that won a Grammy Award for Best Boxed or Special Limited Edition Package, 2008

=== Song ===
- "What It Is" (Busta Rhymes song), 2001
- "What It Is" (Jonathan Davis song), 2018
- "What It Is" (Mark Knopfler song), 2000
- "What It Is (Block Boy)", by Doechii, 2023
- "What It Is", by Angel Olsen from All Mirrors, 2019
- "What It Is", by Black Eyed Peas from Behind the Front, 1998
- "What It Is", by Gorilla Zoe from Don't Feed da Animals, 2009
- "What It Is", by NCT JNJM from Both Sides, 2026
- "What It Is", by Nina Hagen from Fearless, 1983
- "What It Is", by Paul McCartney from Run Devil Run, 1999
- "What It Is", by Quality Control and Offset from Control the Streets, Volume 2, 2019
- "What It Is (Strike a Pose)", by Lil Mama from VYP (Voice of the Young People), 2008

== Other ==
- What It Is, a 2009 comedy stand-up DVD by Dylan Moran
- What It Is, a 2008 graphic novel by Lynda Barry

== See also ==
- It Is What It Is (disambiguation)
- What is it (disambiguation)
