= Let It Burn =

Let It Burn may refer to:

== Albums ==
- Let It Burn (Datsik album), 2013
- Let It Burn, a 2004 EP by The Vasco Era
- Let It Burn (Nebula album), 1998

== Songs ==
- "Let It Burn" (song), by Jazmine Sullivan, 2015
- "Let It Burn", by Bad Religion from The New America
- "Let It Burn", by Blaze Ya Dead Homie
- "Let It Burn", by Ignite from Our Darkest Days
- "Let It Burn", by Red from Until We Have Faces
- "Let It Burn", by Ryan Adams from Prisoner (B-Sides)
- "Let It Burn", by stic.man from The Workout
- "Let It Burn", by Volbeat from Seal the Deal & Let's Boogie
- "Let It Burn", by ZZ Ward from The Storm
