= Cold Blooded (EP) =

Cold Blooded EP (Part One)

EP by Datsik
- Released: January 22, 2013
- Genres: Dubstep, glitch hop, drumstep, drum and bass, electro house
- Length: 28:50
- Label: Firepower Records
- Producer: Troy Beetles

Datsik chronology
Vitamin D (2012)	Cold Blooded EP (Part One) (2013)	Let It Burn LP (2013)

Singles from this album
- 1. "Vindicate" Released: Jan 8, 2013; 2. "Release Me" Released: May 21, 2013 (Remixes)

Cold Blooded is an EP by Canadian dubstep producer and artist Troy Beetles, better known as Datsik. It was released on January 22, 2013 in the US through his own label, Firepower Records. Although the extended play's full title, Cold Blooded EP (Part One), implies being the first of a series of EPs, it is confirmed to be followed by his second studio album, Let It Burn LP (Part Two).

The first official single from the EP is "Vindicate", which was produced with Excision. It was released on January 8, 2013. A remix EP for the track "Release Me" was also released later on May 21, 2013.

== Background and release ==
Cold Blooded is Datsik's fourth EP; his first as solo artist. All of the tracks on the EP were produced by Datsik. He reunites with artists such as fellow Canadian dubstep producer Excision (whom he has worked with multiple times through Rottun Recordings) on the song "Vindicate", Messinian (noted for MCing in other songs by Excision and Datsik, such as "X Rated" from the album of the same name and "Napalm" from Vitamin D) to create "Automatik", and Canadian rapper Snak the Ripper (whom he has made the single "Fully Blown" with) to form the track "Machete", along with underground Canadian rapper Young Sin.

Datsik also uses his own vocals in the song "Too Late to Say No". The song also has a music video. Directed by Justin Donnelly, it was first published to Datsik's YouTube channel on Jul 21, 2013. The video features Datsik performing while a group of individuals adventure Hollywood.

As of the week of release, Cold Blooded was rated #1 dance album on iTunes.

== Track listing ==
No.	Title	Producer(s)	Length
1.	"Cold Blooded"	Datsik	3:44
2.	"Automatik" (featuring Messinian)	Datsik	3:44
3.	"Machete" (featuring Snak the Ripper & Young Sin)	Datsik	3:34
4.	"Juicebox"	Datsik	3:45
5.	"Too Late to Say No"	Datsik	4:42
6.	"Vindicate" (with Excision)	Datsik, Excision (co.)	4:35
7.	"Release Me"	Datsik	4:37
Total length:			28:50

• (co.) designates co-producer

== Charts ==
Chart (2013)	Peak position
US Heatseekers Albums	6
US Dance/Electronic Albums	10
US Independent Albums	40
