= Got the Life (book) =

2009 memoir by Reginald "Fieldy" Arvizu

Got the Life: My Journey of Addiction, Faith, Recovery, and Korn
- Author: Fieldy (with Laura Morton)
- Language: English
- Genre: Autobiography
- Publisher: William Morrow
- Publication date: March 10, 2009
- Publication place: United States
- Media type: Print hardback
- Pages: 288 (hard cover)
- ISBN: 978-0-06-166249-2
- OCLC: 191930152
- LC Class: ML420.F465 A3 2009

Got the Life: My Journey of Addiction, Faith, Recovery, and Korn is a memoir penned by Reginald "Fieldy" Arvizu, the bassist and founding member of the American nu metal band Korn. Published in 2009 by HarperCollins, the book provides a candid account of Arvizu's tumultuous journey through fame, addiction, and eventual redemption.

== Synopsis ==
The narrative delves into Arvizu's early life, marked by rebellion. Growing up, he grappled with issues of fidelity in relationships, substance abuse, and an insatiable appetite for the rock and roll lifestyle. Arvizu candidly recounts his experiences with drugs, including alcohol and speed, highlighting the dangers of addiction. His involvement in the music scene, particularly his role in shaping Korn's distinctive sound, is explored in detail, shedding light on his evolution as a musician.

Central to the narrative is Arvizu's transformation from self-destructive to a man of faith and sobriety. The pivotal moment in his life comes with the death of his father, which serves as a wake-up call, prompting him to reassess his choices and embrace spirituality. Through introspection and soul-searching, Arvizu finds solace in religion, embarking on a journey of personal growth and redemption.
