= Sound Surgery =

EP by Killbot
- Released: 22 October 2012
- Recorded: 2012
- Genre: Dubstep; electronic
- Length: 17:51
- Label: Dim Mak Records
- Producer: Killbot

Singles from Sound Surgery
- 1. "I'll F**k It" Released: September 28, 2012; 2. "Wrecked" Released: October 9, 2012; 3. "Feel Alive" Released: October 22, 2012

Sound Surgery is a four track EP by American dubstep group Killbot. Released through Steve Aoki's record label Dim Mak Records, the group features Jonathan Davis AKA JDevil, Nick Suddarth AKA Sluggo, and Tyler Blue. The EP debuted at number 13 on the Billboards Top Dance/Electronic Albums chart on the week of November 13, 2012.

== Recording ==
After discovering Suddarth's track The Dark Crystal and being a huge fan of the 1982 film, Davis invited Suddarth to his Bakersfield studio to record some tracks. Suddarth decided to bring Blue along, whom he'd also just met, and the three of them immediately hit it off. They recorded the first two tracks, Wrecked and I'll F**k It, in just 12 hours. Davis said about it:

"We got in my studio and just f**king went for it. It was one of the most natural things I've ever done. I can't really describe it."

Suddarth would elaborated further, explaining that with all of them bringing their unique styles into the mix they felt they were doing something that no one else had ever done.

"The three of us bring a lot to the table. We're a good team, and we made something completely original between my 'metalstep', Tyler's club groove, and JDevil's darkness. It's a monster."

I'll F**k It seemed to come together naturally for the trio. Blue recalls creating the base track with Suddarth and then giving it to Davis to "do his thing". Davis had a lot of fun with it, calling it "sexy and dark" and a "call-to-arms for people to have a good time". Davis admitted to pushing himself on the track Feel Alive. He used the music that Suddarth and Blue had created for the track as a platform to take his vocals to greater heights than he'd ever done before.

"I wanted to hit notes I haven't hit, and the music that Sluggo and Tyler put down was perfect. The song is about just wanting to feel something. It's like we're all so f**king numb, but there's got to be a way to feel. You're trying to reach that and you don't know if you ever will or not."

== Reception ==
Sound Surgery received mixed reviews upon release. In its first week, the EP was voted Album of the Week on the Revolver Magazine website, winning by less than 300 votes.

Artistdirect gave it 5 out of 5 stars, praising the trio's willingness to think outside the box with their musical style.

"While everyone else has their hands up blindly to another faceless DJ in the club, pool party, or festival, these three get downright dangerous and destructive with a vicious initiative, message, and image. They're the whole package and more..."

Elektro Daily describes it as having "head-bang ready driving, blitzing basslines along with seismic synths that sound like they emerged from the depths from hell". They commend the groups diversity in the production, highlighting the metal-esque riffs on Sound Surgery, the grinding basslines on Feel Alive, and the electro house influences on Wrecked.

"Nu metal fans who have been opposed to the electronic music scene in the past will surely be swayed by this impressive production."

Apple Music explains that the EP "gives dubstep an exaggerated feel....with nu-metal aggression", and similarly emphasizes the diverse influences present in the songs. AllMusic mentions that the response from Davis' fans was also mixed, some thinking it was "too drastic a departure" from Korn, and others "greeting it favourably".

== Track listing ==
All tracks are written by JDevil, Sluggo, and Tyler Blue.

No.	Title	Length
1.	"Sound Surgery"	4:48
2.	"Feel Alive"	4:13
3.	"Wrecked"	4:31
4.	"I'll F**k It"	4:19
Total length:		17:51

== Personnel ==
- Jonathan "JDevil" Davis
- Nick "Sluggo" Suddarth
- Tyler Blue
