= Cradle of Thorns =

American rock band

Background information
- Also known as: Videodrone (1998-2000)
- Origin: Bakersfield, California, U.S.
- Genres: Gothic rock; electronic rock; industrial rock; nu metal
- Years active: 1988–2000, 2006–2015
- Labels: Triple X; Elementree
- Members: Ty Elam; Steve Thiriot; Matt Wilkinson
- Past members: David File; Kris Kohls; Rohan Cowden; Tamera Slayton; Jay Caruso; Scat Elis; Chris Goodsell; Mavis; Marianne Ray; Chris O'Brian

Cradle of Thorns was an American rock band formed in 1988 in Bakersfield, California by singer Ty Elam. After releasing their debut album, Remember It Day, independently in 1990, the band signed with Triple X Records. In 1998, the band changed their name to Videodrone and signed with Korn's vanity label Elementree Records, releasing their self titled fourth album, Videodrone the following year. Videodrone disbanded two years later, but reformed under their original name from 2007 to 2015.

== History ==
=== Formation and Remember It Day (1988–1990) ===
In 1988 vocalist Ty Elam formed Cradle of Thorns. They toured extensively and earned an underground following. They released an independent record entitled Remember It Day in 1990.

=== Feed-Us (1994–1995) ===
The band signed with Triple X Records (label of Jane's Addiction and Social Distortion) and in 1994 released Feed-Us, produced by Ross Robinson.

=== Download This! (1996–1998) ===
1996's Download This! saw the departure of female vocalist Tamera Slayton and bassist Scat Elis. New bassist Purdy Spackle joined the group. The song "Bulimia Blowjob" features an appearance by vocalist Aimee Echo of Human Waste Project and TheSTART, and Jeff Schartoff, of Human Waste Project and Professional Murder Music.

=== Name change and Videodrone (1998–2000) ===
For their fourth album, bassist Purdy Spackle was replaced by Mavis. They renamed themselves Videodrone, as a play on the film Videodrome, because the band wanted a name that sounded futuristic and retro at the same time, evoking the 1980s, the decade in which the film was released. Their twelve-track, self-titled CD was released in 1999 with appearances from Korn's Jonathan Davis on "Ty Jonathan Down", Limp Bizkit's Fred Durst and DJ Lethal on "Human Piñata", and Psycho Realm on "Pig in a Blanket". Also from Korn, Head played guitar on "Power Tools for Girls" and Fieldy produced the album.

=== Break up and post-Videodrone projects (2000–2006) ===
After touring with Korn, Rob Zombie, Orgy, and Machine Head, lack of label support and drug problems spelled the end for Videodrone (as detailed in the interview with Elam on the "All Over Again" maxi-single). Drummer Kris Kohls went on to play for Adema and vocalist Ty Elam would go on to play in local Bakersfield bands after Videodrone's demise in 2000.

=== Reformation (2007–2015) ===
In 2007, Ty Elam resurrected the band under its original moniker Cradle of Thorns with all new members. The song "All Over Again" was released as a single, which can be heard on the band's official MySpace page. Elam later appeared on metal band Mastiv's album, End of the Silence, released in 2011. By 2015, Cradle of Thorns's official homepage ceased, and nothing has been stated regarding the group's future since.

== Style and influences ==
The band was categorized as gothic rock, industrial rock, industrial metal and nu metal. Cradle of Thorns was known for their "heavy, but dark dance" style. Initially "gothy, industrial-tinged", the band's style would become, upon signing with Elementree Records, with their later style being described as both "a glitchy, synth-pop influenced take on nu metal" and "Undercore", a synthesis of glam, goth and synth-rock with science fiction.

Their style incorporated elements of heavy metal, hard rock, funk, gothic rock, jazz, opera and hip-hop. The band's influences included horror film scores, Skinny Puppy, Ministry, The Disposable Heroes of Hiphoprisy, Consolidated and Korn. They were described as a cross between Korn, Orgy and Marilyn Manson.

== Members ==
Current

- Ty Elam – vocals (1988–2000), drums (2006–2015)
- Steve Thiriot – guitar, synthesizers, screams (2007–2015)
- Matt Wilkinson – bass (2007–2015)

Former

- David File – guitar (1988–2000)
- Kris Kohls – drums (1988–2000)
- Rohan Cowden – keyboards (1988–2000)
- Tamera Slayton – vocals (1988–1995)
- Jay Caruso – bass (1988–1992)
- Scat Elis – bass (1992–1995)
- Purdy Spackle – bass (1995–1997)
- Mavis – bass (1997–2000)

Timeline

== Discography ==
=== Cradle of Thorns ===
- Remember It Day (1990)
- Feed-Us (1994)
- Download This! (1996)

=== Videodrone ===
- Videodrone (February 23, 1999)

==== Singles ====
List of singles, with selected chart positions, showing year released and album name
| Title | Year | Peak chart positions | Album |
| Title | Year | US Dance | Album |
|---|---|---|---|
| "Faceplant" | 1999 | 15 | Videodrone |
| "All Over Again" | 2008 | — | Non-album single |
"—" denotes a recording that did not chart or was not released in that territory.

==== Music videos ====
List of music videos, showing year released and director
| Title | Year | Director(s) |
|---|---|---|
| "Ty Jonathan Down" (featuring Jonathan Davis) | 2000 | Jonathan Davis |
