= Videodrone (album) =

Studio album by Videodrone
- Released: February 23, 1999
- Studio: LA FX Studios (North Hollywood, California)
- Genre: Industrial metal; nu metal
- Length: 57:25
- Label: Elementree
- Producer: Fieldy

Cradle of Thorns chronology
Download This! (1996)	Videodrone (1999)

Professional ratings
Review scores
Source	Rating
Allmusic	3/5 stars

Videodrone is the fourth and final studio album by the rock band Cradle of Thorns and the only album to be released under the name Videodrone. It was released in 1999 on Elementree Records. The intro of "C.O.B." features a rendition by the band of the popular Christmas song "Silent Night", followed by instrumental noises for the rest of the track's duration.

== Track listing ==
All lyrics are written by Ty Elam, except where noted; all music is composed by Cradle of Thorns, except "Jesus (Lord of the Apes)" by L.A.P.D..

No.	Title	Lyrics	Length
1.	"Ty Jonathan Down"	Jonathan Davis	4:21
2.	"Closer to Coma"		5:01
3.	"Alone With 20 Bucks"		4:11
4.	"Devil's Sweepstakes"		3:46
5.	"Faceplant"		3:52
6.	"Human Piñata"	Fred Durst	4:07
7.	"Pig in a Blanket"	Sick Jacken, Big Duke	4:29
8.	"L.S.D. (Lucifer's Stained Dress)"		3:11
9.	"Ant in the Dope"		4:22
10.	"Power Tools for Girls"		5:31
11.	"Jesus (Lord of the Apes)" (L.A.P.D. cover)	Reginald Arvizu, Richard Morrill, James Shaffer, David Silveria	3:09
12.	"C.O.B."		11:25

== Personnel ==
Adapted from the Videodrone liner notes.

Videodrone

- Rohan Cowden – keyboards, sampler
- Ty Elam – vocals
- Kris Kohls – drums, percussion
- David File – guitar
- Mavis – bass guitar, backing vocals

Additional musicians

- Lauren Boquette – vocals (10)
- Jonathan Davis – vocals (1)
- Sick Jacken – vocals (7)
- Big Duke – vocals (7)

Additional musicians (cont.)

- DJ Lethal – scratching (6)
- Fred Durst – vocals (6)
- Kelly Langely – vocals (8)
- Chris O'Brien – vocals and guitar (12)
- Brian "Head" Welch – guitar (10)

Production and additional personnel

- Reginald "Fieldy" Arvizu – production
- David Kahne – mixing (1, 5)
- Stephen Marcussen – mastering
- John X Volaitis – mixing (2–4, 6–12)

== Release history ==
Region	Date	Label	Format	Catalog
United States	1999	Reprise	CD	9 47309
