= What is it =

What is it? is a common interrogational phrase.

What is it or variation may also refer to:

- What is it reflex, the psychological reflex to a novel input, causing the phrase "What is it?"
- "What Is It", a 2007 song and 2008 single by Baby Bash off the 2007 album Cyclone
- What Is It?, a 2005 U.S. surrealist film
- What Is It? (album), a 2003 album by Naturally 7
- Zip the Pinhead (1857–1927), William Henry Johnson, a U.S. freakshow performer, also called "The What Is It?"

== See also ==
- What It Is (disambiguation)
- It Is What It Is (disambiguation)
