= Georgia Murray =

Canadian singer-songwriter (born 1984)

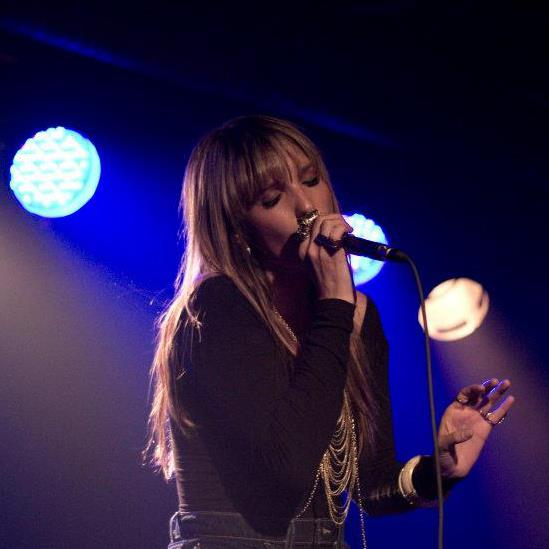
- Murray performing in 2012

Background information
- Born: April 23, 1984 (age 41); Port McNeill, British Columbia, Canada
- Genres: Alternative; pop; soul
- Occupation: Singer-songwriter
- Years active: 2009–present
- Member of: LIINKS

Georgia Murray is a Canadian singer-songwriter whose 2009 song "We'll Never Know" was plagiarized by composer Bahnus to create the song "Swing" (feat. LeeSang) for Korean pop star Lee Hyori. "Swing" became the number one song in Korea on April 4, 2010. Georgia was later compensated and given a writing credit from MNet Media, the Seoul-based entertainment company that had released the plagiarized song.

Murray portrayed herself in an episode of the ABC show Boston Legal in its second season.

On September 18, 2011, Murray was named one of the eight final contestants vying for $100,000 and a recording contract with Universal Canada on Cover Me Canada, CBC Television's live music competition series. She won Fan Favourite at Victoria BC's Times Colonist 2011 Music Awards. She was also chosen by the readers of Victoria's Monday Magazine as Favourite Hip Hop/R'n'B Artist or Group at the magazines annual M Awards. In June 2011 Murray released a six-song EP titled Just a Dream produced and co-written by her partner DWHIZ. In May 2012 Just a Dream was nominated for a Western Canadian Music Award in the Urban Recording of the Year category.

In June 2012 Murray was selected as one of the top 20 artists in British Columbia to participate in CKPK-FM's PEAK Performance Project.

Georgia's brother, Clifton Murray, is a member of the group The Tenors.

She was a featured vocalist in the song "Hold It Down" by Canadian dubstep artist Datsik from his 2013 LP Let It Burn.

On April 1, 2014, Murray and dj/producer DWHIZ launched a new project called LIINKS and released radio singles such as "The Break".
