= It Is What It Is =

"It Is What It Is" is a tautophrase, and an idiomatic phrase, indicating the immutable nature of an object or circumstance.

It may refer also to:

== Music ==
=== Albums ===
- B.A.R.S. The Barry Adrian Reese Story or It Is What It Is, by Cassidy, 2007
- It Is What It Is (ABN album), 2008
- It Is What It Is (Johnny Logan album), 2017
- It Is What It Is (Thundercat album), 2020
- It Is What It Is, by The Hitmen, 1982
- Is What It Is, by Mike Stern, 1994

=== Songs ===
- "It Is What It Is (What It Is)", by Adam Again from Dig, 1992
- "It Is What It Is", by Big Sean from Better Me Than You, 2024
- "It Is What It Is", by Blood Orange from Cupid Deluxe, 2013
- "It Is What It Is", by Derrick May from the compilation album Techno! The New Dance Sound of Detroit, 1988
- "It Is What It Is", by The Highwaymen from the album The Road Goes On Forever, 1995
- "It Is What It Is", by Kacey Musgraves from Same Trailer Different Park, 2013
- "It Is What It Is", by Lecrae from Church Clothes 3, 2016
- "It Is What It Is", by Lifehouse from Smoke & Mirrors, 2010
- "It Is What It Is", by Rachel Chinouriri from What a Devastating Turn of Events, 2024
- "It Is What It Is", by Uncle Kracker from Midnight Special, 2012
- "It Is What It Is", by Vic Chesnutt from At the Cut, 2009

== Other uses ==
- It Is What It Is, a 2001 film by Billy Frolick
- It Is What It Is, a 2007 autobiography by David Coulthard
- It Is What It Is: Conversations About Iraq, a project by Jeremy Deller
- It Is What It Is, a radio show hosted by Sean Baligian

== See also ==
- Fihi Ma Fihi (Persian: فیه مافیه; Arabic: فیه ما فیه; lit. It Is What It Is), a Persian prose work by Rumi
- What It Is (disambiguation)
- What is it (disambiguation)
