= Killbot =

American band

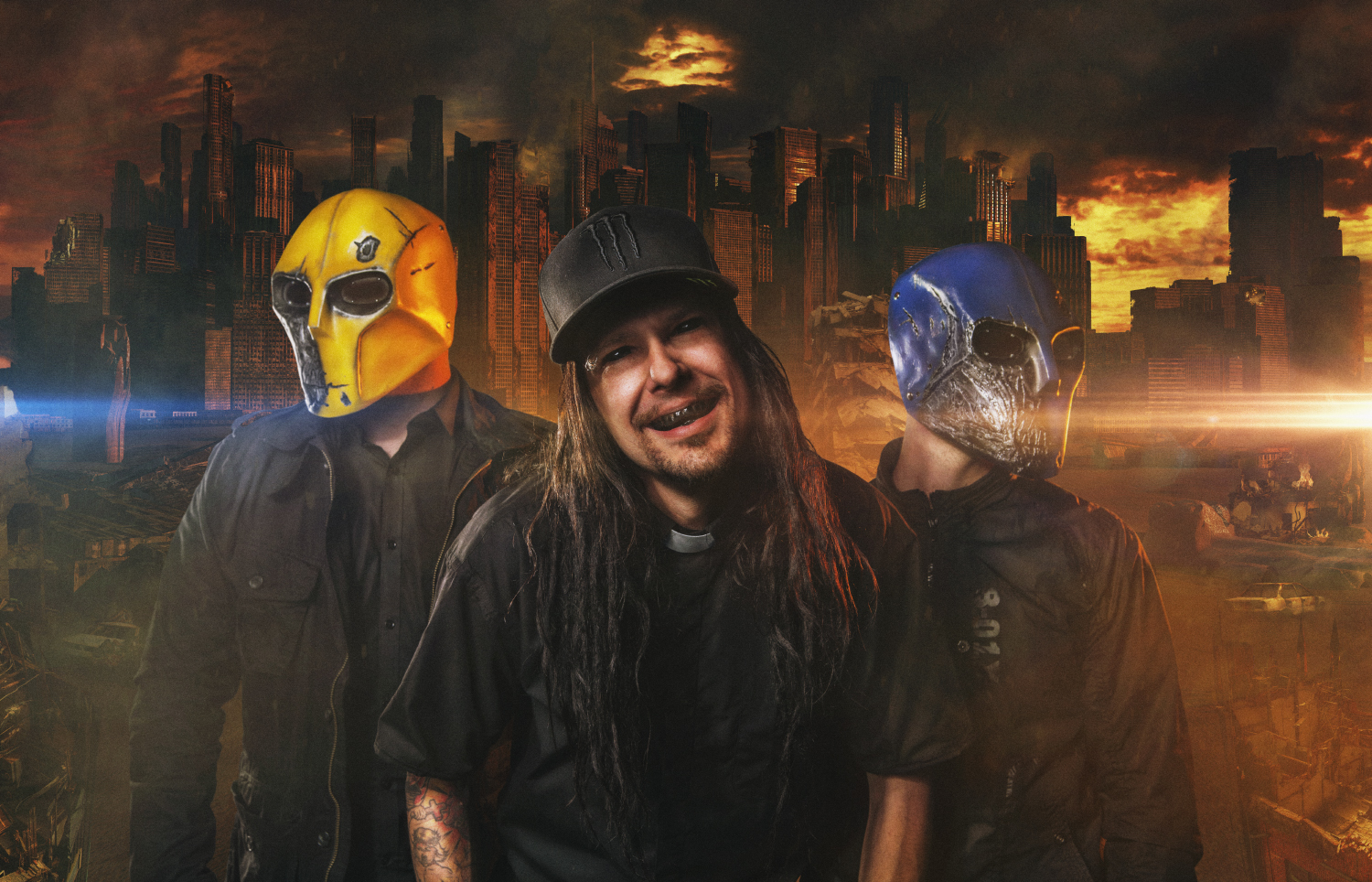

Background information
- Genres: Dubstep, electronica, drum and bass, moombahton
- Years active: 2012–2015
- Label: Dim Mak
- Members: JDevil (Jonathan Davis); Nick Suddarth; Tyler Blue

Killbot was an American electronic dance music trio formed in January 2012. The lineup includes JDevil (Jonathan Davis of Korn), Sluggo (Nick Suddarth) and Tyler Blue. Killbot's music is a fusion of dubstep, electro, drum and bass, and moombahton.

== History ==
The band's first release, "I'll Fuck It", debuted on Spin's official website on September 28, 2012. Another track, "Wrecked", was world premiered on Dubstep.net on October 8, 2012. "Feel Alive" debuted on ARTISTdirect on October 22, 2012. Their debut EP, Sound Surgery, was released via Dim Mak Records on October 22, 2012, peaking at number two on the iTunes dance chart within the first 24 hours of availability. The "Sound Surgery" EP was named #9 on ARTISTdirect Top 10 Albums of 2012.

In April 2014, the trio posted a status update that their next album is currently under production and is nearing completion. The month after, they posted a comment made by Sluggo quoting; "On my way to Los Angeles to Finish the Killbot album, with iwrestledabearonce's Steven Bradley!".

== Discography ==
=== EPs ===
Title	Details	Peak chart positions	
Title	Details	US Dance	US Heat.
Sound Surgery	Released: October 22, 2012; Label: Dim Mak; Formats: Digital download	13	19

=== Remixes ===
Song	Original artist
Coming Undone	Korn
Empty Hearted	Designer Drugs & Alvin Risk
