= Rock'n Roll Gangster =

Studio album by Fieldy's Dreams
- Released: January 22, 2002
- Recorded: May–June 2000
- Studio: Indigo Ranch Studios (Malibu, California)
- Genre: G-funk, gangsta rap, hardcore hip hop
- Length: 40:25
- Label: Epic
- Producer: Reginald Arvizu; Bjorn "Polarbear" Soderberg

Professional ratings
Review scores
Source	Rating
AllMusic	2.5/5 stars
RapReviews	3/10
The Guardian	2/5 stars

Rock'n Roll Gangster is the only studio album by Fieldy's Dreams, a hip hop project of Korn bass guitarist Reginald "Fieldy" Arvizu. It was released on January 22, 2002, via Epic Records. Production was handled by Bjorn "Polarbear" Soderberg and Fieldy himself. The album features guest appearances from RBX, Angela Rascoe, Helluva, Jonathan Davis, Polarbear, Son Doobie and Slimkid3. Rock'n Roll Gangster peaked at number 15 on the Billboard Heatseekers Albums chart in the US. The Fieldy's Dreams song "Baby Hugh Hef" placed tenth on a list of the "50 Worst Songs of the '00s" in a 2009 Village Voice article.

== Track listing ==
No.	Title	Lyrics	Music	Producer(s)	Length
1.	"Cocky"		Fieldy	Dr. Dreams	0:16
2.	"Baby Hugh Hef"	Fieldy; Fred Alexander Jr.; Norman Beavers; Marvin Craig; Artis Ivey; Frederick Lewis; Tiemeyer McCain; Thomas Shelby; Stephen Shockley; Otis Stokes; Mark Wood, Jr.	Fieldy; Alexander Jr.; Beavers; Craig; Ivey; Lewis; McCain; Shelby; Shockley; Stokes; Wood, Jr.	Dr. Dreams	3:20
3.	"Rock N Roll Gangster"	Aalon Butler	Butler	Jerry Goldstein	0:21
4.	"Are You Talkin' to Me" (featuring Helluva)	Fieldy	Fieldy	Dr. Dreams	2:34
5.	"Just for Now" (featuring Jonathan Davis)	Fieldy; Jonathan Davis	Björn "Polarbear" Söderberg	Polarbear	3:29
6.	"You Saved Me (From Being Crazy)"	Fieldy; Rick James	Söderberg; James	Polarbear	3:01
7.	"Munky Rage"		James Shaffer	Dr. Dreams	0:19
8.	"Put a Week on It" (featuring Son Doobie)	Fieldy	Söderberg		3:33
9.	"Child Vigilante"	Fieldy; Lawrence Smith; Jalil Hutchins	Söderberg; Smith; Hutchins	Polarbear	3:58
10.	"Korn Gigglebox"		Davis; Brian Welch; Shaffer; Fieldy; David Silveria	Fieldy	0:20
11.	"Sugar-Coated" (featuring Tre)	Fieldy; Tre	Söderberg	Polarbear	3:05
12.	"Comin' From a Friend"	Fieldy	Söderberg; Pierre Sénécal	Polarbear	3:04
13.	"One Love" (featuring Angela Rascoe)	Fieldy	Fieldy	Dr. Dreams	3:25
14.	"Ortiz Anthem" (featuring RBX)	Fieldy	Söderberg	Polarbear	3:39
15.	"Special K Buzz"		Davis; Welch; Shaffer; Fieldy; Silveria	Dr. Dreams	0:16
16.	"Bleu"	Fieldy	Fieldy	Dr. Dreams	2:47
17.	"Do What You Feel" (featuring RBX & Polarbear)	Fieldy; RBX; Söderberg	Fieldy	Dr. Dreams	2:58

Sample credits

- "Baby Hugh Hef" contains an interpolation of "Fantastic Voyage", written by Artis Ivey, Fred Alexander Jr., Norman Beavers, Marvin Craig, Frederick Lewis, Tiemeyer McCain, Thomas Shelby, Stephen Shockley, Otis Stokes, and Mark Wood Jr..
- "Rock N Roll Gangster" contains elements of "Rock 'N' Roll Gangster", written by Aalon Butler, as performed by Aalon.
- "Child Vigilante" contains an interpolation of "Freaks Come Out at Night", written by Lawrence Smith and Jalil Hutchins.
- "Comin' From a Friend" contains a sample of "I Know I've Been Wrong", written by Pierre Sénécal, as performed by Mashmakhan.
