= Rotting in Vain =

- Best Buy CD single cover

Single by Korn

from the album The Serenity of Suffering
- Released: July 22, 2016
- Genre: Nu metal
- Length: 3:32
- Label: Roadrunner
- Songwriters: Jonathan Davis; James Shaffer; Brian Welch; Reginald Arvizu; Ray Luzier
- Producer: Nick Raskulinecz

Korn singles chronology
"Hater" (2014)	"Rotting in Vain" (2016)	"Insane" (2016)

Music video
- "Rotting in Vain" on YouTube

"Rotting in Vain" is a song by American nu metal band Korn. Written by the band and produced by Nick Raskulinecz, it was featured on the band's 2016 twelfth studio album The Serenity of Suffering. The song was also released as the lead single from the album on July 22, 2016, reaching number 4 on the Billboard Mainstream Rock Songs chart and number 26 on the UK Rock & Metal Singles Chart. It was nominated for Best Metal Performance at the 59th Annual Grammy Awards.

== Release ==
"Rotting in Vain" was first revealed on July 16, 2016 when it received its debut live performance at the Chicago Open Air concert. According to Loudwire's Graham Hartmann, "Rotting in Vain" is "Led by a heavy groove and chaotic atmosphere", which later "spirals into darker realms with Jonathan Davis' tortured vocals". Jon Wiederhorn for Radio.com added that the song features "otherworldly guitar effects, a deep, dark groove ... downtuned, distorted guitars and circular bass lines". Speaking about the inspiration for the track upon its release, Korn frontman Jonathan Davis offered the following insight:

"Rotting in Vain" was written about being in that black place, being in situations that I don't like in life – be it relationships, or feeling when you're stuck and you're just being abused or you don't like where you're at, and you just sit there and rot. It takes you years and years to figure out how to claw your way out. That's where "Rotting in Vain" came from. I'm just sitting there, fucking dying and letting it happen for years and years and not helping myself to get out of that place. That's the vibe that inspired the song.

== Music video ==
The music video for "Rotting in Vain" was released on July 22, 2016, following a trailer four days before. Directed by Dean Karr and filmed in "a rundown two-story building" in Los Angeles, California, it features actor Tommy Flanagan, best known for portraying Filip "Chibs" Telford on the FX TV series Sons of Anarchy and Tullk from Guardians of the Galaxy Vol. 2, who is shown "huff[ing] gas, drink[ing] from a goblet and play[ing] with curios" as the band performs elsewhere in the building and "all but destroys his Sweeney Todd–styled abode". During the opening section of the song, vocalist Jonathan Davis emerges from underneath layers of leaves and dust in a bathtub, which the singer claimed entered his lungs and led to him "coughing up dirt loogies" afterwards. Other members of the band make "similarly dramatic entrances", including guitarists James "Munky" Shaffer "burst[ing] from the floorboards" and Brian "Head" Welch "crash[ing] through cement"; drummer Raymond Luzier "Ray" getting through wooden crates and rubbish, and bassist "Fieldy" Reginald Arvizu waking up in paper and wood.

== Critical reception ==
Metal Hammer's Dom Lawson praised the song, including its "big" chorus and "wickedly self-referential burst of Davies' [sic] trademark gorilla gibberish", claiming that "Korn sound newly excited and ferociously focused". The track has been dubbed by many commentators as a conscious return to the style of the band's earlier releases – Lawson compared it stylistically to 1999's Issues and 2002's Untouchables, in part due to the presence of scat singing, Radio.com's Jon Wiederhorn described it as "reminiscent" of Life Is Peachy (1996) and Follow the Leader (1998), while Graham Hartmann of Loudwire simply dubbed it "classic Korn".

== Charts ==
=== Weekly charts ===
Weekly chart performance for "Rotting in Vain"
Chart (2016)	Peak position
Czech Republic Rock (IFPI)	3
German Alternative Singles (Deutsche Alternative Charts)	1
Mexico Ingles Airplay (Billboard)	46
UK Rock & Metal (Official Charts)	26
US Hot Rock & Alternative Songs (Billboard)	20
US Rock & Alternative Airplay (Billboard)	19

=== Year-end charts ===
Year-end chart performance for "Rotting in Vain"
Chart (2016)	Position
US Hot Rock & Alternative Songs (Billboard)	84
