= Let It Burn (Datsik album) =

Let It Burn LP (Part Two)

Studio album by Datsik
- Released: September 24, 2013
- Genre: Dubstep, drum and bass, electro house
- Length: 44: 28
- Label: Firepower Records
- Producer: Troy Beetles

Datsik chronology
Cold Blooded EP (2013)	Let It Burn LP (Part Two) (2013)	Down 4 My Ninjas (2014)

Singles from this album
- 1. "Hold It Down" Released: Apr 15, 2014 (Remixes)

Let It Burn is a studio album by Canadian dubstep producer and artist Troy Beetles, better known as Datsik. It was released digitally on September 24, 2013 in the United States through his own label Firepower Records. It is the sequel release to the Cold Blooded EP, which was released on January 22, 2013.

A remix EP for the track "Hold It Down" (featuring Georgia Murray) was released on April 15, 2014.

== Background and release ==
Let It Burn is Datsik's second full-length studio album, the first being Vitamin D. The album features production from fellow Firepower Records artist Getter and Los Angeles-based electronic music producer Bais Haus, and includes collaborations with singer Georgia Murray in the track "Hold It Down" and rapper Zyme in the track "Oxygen". The track "Scum" is inspired by the video game character and franchise Duke Nukem.

== Track listing ==
No.	Title	Producer(s)	Length
1.	"Let It Burn"	Datsik	4:24
2.	"East Side Swing"	Datsik	3:56
3.	"Hold It Down" (featuring Georgia Murray)	Datsik	4:34
4.	"Scum"	Datsik	3:48
5.	"Buckshot"	Datsik	4:32
6.	"Oxygen" (featuring Zyme)	Datsik	3:44
7.	"Glock Burst" (with Getter)	Datsik, Getter (co.)	3:47
8.	"Closer To the Sun" (with Bais Haus)	Datsik, Bais Haus (co.)	7:07
9.	"Athena"	Datsik	4:24
10.	"All Or Nothing"	Datsik	4:12
Total length:			44:28

• (co.) designates co-producer

== Charts ==
Chart (2013)	Peak position
US Heatseekers Albums	19
US Dance/Electronic Albums	11
