= What It Is (Jonathan Davis song) =

Single by Jonathan Davis

from the album Black Labyrinth
- Released: 26 January 2018
- Genre: Alternative metal; gothic metal
- Length: 3:54
- Label: Sumerian
- Songwriter(s): Jonathan Davis; Lauren Christy; Gary Clark
- Producer(s): Jonathan Davis

Jonathan Davis singles chronology
| "Silent Hill" (2012) | "What It Is" (2018) | "Basic Needs" (2018) |

Music video
- "What It Is" on YouTube

"What It Is" is the first single from Korn singer Jonathan Davis, to be featured on his debut album Black Labyrinth.

The song is his first solo track since 2012's "Silent Hill", from the Silent Hill: Downpour soundtrack. After a teaser was released on 25 January 2018, it was released the next day along with a music video, and confirmation of Davis' signing to Sumerian Records. It is also featured on the soundtrack for the Sumerian Films movie American Satan. On 1 October 2020, Davis released a country version of the song.

== Track listing ==
| No. | Title | Lyrics | Length |
|---|---|---|---|
| 1. | "What It Is" | Jonathan Davis | 3:54 |

== Charts ==
| Chart (2018) | Peak position |
|---|---|
| US Mainstream Rock (Billboard) | 5 |

== Personnel ==
- Jonathan Davis - vocals
- Wes Borland - guitars
- Zac Baird - keyboards
- Ray Luzier - drums
- Shenkar - violin, additional vocals
