= Black Labyrinth =

Studio album by Jonathan Davis
- Released: May 25, 2018
- Recorded: 2007 – January 2018
- Genres: Alternative metal; alternative rock; electronic rock
- Length: 50:20
- Label: Sumerian
- Producers: Jonathan Davis, Tiago Nunez

Jonathan Davis chronology
Live at the Union Chapel (2011)	Black Labyrinth (2018)

Singles from Black Labyrinth
- 1. "What It Is" Released: January 26, 2018; 2. "Basic Needs" Released: August 17, 2018

Black Labyrinth is the debut solo studio album by American vocalist Jonathan Davis (best known as the frontman of nu metal band Korn). The album was released on May 25, 2018, through Sumerian Records.

The first single, "What It Is", was released on January 26, 2018, as part of the soundtrack to the movie American Satan.

== Background ==
Jonathan Davis had hinted at a solo album for a number of years, first working without his bandmates in Korn when he collaborated on the Queen of the Damned soundtrack. Word of a full solo album began to circulate in the mid-2000s when Davis began touring and writing with his solo band, Jonathan Davis and the SFA, with whom he released two live albums, Alone I Play (2007) and Live at the Union Chapel (2011). The SFA was disbanded after the death of guitarist Shane Gibson. Over the next decade, Davis would continue to write solo material while performing with Korn, and in January 2018 announced a North American and European tour in support of a new album that would come out later in the year. That same month, he released the song What It Is.

In March 2018, Sumerian Records revealed an official teaser for the album, which revealed the title, artwork and release date, along with snippets of each track on the album. While a full list of musicians has yet to be officially released, it has been confirmed that Ray Luzier, Wes Borland, Miles Mosley, Mike Dillon and Shenkar have all made appearances on the album.

== Critical reception ==
Professional ratings
Aggregate scores
Source	Rating
Metacritic	64/100
Review scores
Source	Rating
AllMusic	3.5/5 stars
The Independent	3/5 stars
Kerrang!	3/5 stars
Metal Hammer	3.5/5 stars
NME	3/5 stars
Sputnikmusic	2.0/5

"Black Labyrinth" received generally favorable reviews from critics. At Metacritic, which assigns a normalized rating out of 100 to reviews from mainstream publications, the album received an average score of 64 based on 5 reviews.

== Track listing ==
No.	Title	Writer(s)	Length
1.	"Underneath My Skin"	Jonathan Davis	3:46
2.	"Final Days"	Davis	4:37
3.	"Everyone"	Davis	2:53
4.	"Happiness"	Davis	2:58
5.	"Your God"	Davis	2:49
6.	"Walk On By"	Davis	3:41
7.	"The Secret"	Davis, Miles Mosley, Lauren Christy	3:31
8.	"Basic Needs"	Davis, Lauren Christy, Gary Clark	6:14
9.	"Medicate"	Davis, Zac Baird	3:57
10.	"Please Tell Me"	Davis	4:28
11.	"What You Believe"	Davis	4:05
12.	"Gender"	Davis, Christy	3:27
13.	"What It Is"	Davis, Christy, Clark	3:54
Total length:			50:20

== Personnel ==
Musicians

- Jonathan Davis – vocals, guitar, keyboards, programming, violin, sitar, production
- Wes Borland – guitars (tracks 2, 5, 8, 10, 13)
- Miles Mosley – bass guitar (tracks 2–8, 10, 12)
- Zac Baird – keyboards (tracks 1–3, 7–10, 13), programming (tracks 4, 9)
- Ray Luzier – drums (tracks 1, 3–8, 10, 13)
- Mike Dillon – percussion (track 2), tablas (track 8, 12)
- Shenkar – violin, additional vocals (tracks 2, 8, 13)
- Djivan Gasparyan – duduk (track 2)
- Byron Katie – sample (track 11)

Production

- Jim Monti – recording
- Tiago Nunez – additional production
- Josh Wilbur – mixing
- Kyle McAulay – mixing assistance
- Vlado Meller – mastering
- David Stoupakis – artwork
- Daniel McBride – logo
- Carly Sarno – logo
- Jonathan Weiner – photography

== Charts ==
Chart (2018)	Peak position
Australian Albums (ARIA)	67
Austrian Albums (Ö3 Austria)	22
Belgian Albums (Ultratop Flanders)	133
Belgian Albums (Ultratop Wallonia)	49
German Albums (Offizielle Top 100)	25
Scottish Albums (Official Charts)	54
Swiss Albums (Schweizer Hitparade)	15
UK Albums (Official Charts)	100
US Billboard 200	67
