= Vitamin D (album) =

Studio album by Datsik
- Released: April 10, 2012
- Genre: Dubstep
- Length: 56:21
- Label: Dim Mak Records, Last Gang Records
- Producer: Datsik, Downlink, Snak the Ripper, Infected Mushroom, Jonathan Davis, Messinian, Z-Trip

Datsik chronology
Vitamin D (2012)	Cold Blooded EP (2013)

Singles from this album
- 1. "Fully Blown" Released: January 31, 2012; 2. "Evilution" Released: March 13, 2012; 3. "Light the Fuse" Released: July 30, 2013

Vitamin D is the debut studio album by Canadian dubstep producer and artist Datsik, released on April 10, 2012. The album was co-produced by various electronic music producers such as fellow Canadian dubstep producer Downlink, Israeli psytrance and electronica production duo Infected Mushroom and American DJ Z-Trip. The first official single from the album is "Fully Blown" (featuring Snak the Ripper), which was released on January 31. The second single, "Evilution", which was co-produced by Infected Mushroom and features vocals from Jonathan Davis of the nu metal band Korn, was released on March 13.

"Light the Fuse" was released as a single (with remixes by Terravita and Sub Antix) over a year after the album's release.

== Background ==
This is Datsik's first studio album. Datsik mainly created the album's tracks; the album also includes tracks that were co-produced by Downlink, Infected Mushroom and Z-Trip and co-written by Snak the Ripper, Jonathan Davis and Messinian.

== Track listing ==
No.	Title	Producer(s)	Length
1.	"Annihilate"	Datsik	4:00
2.	"Fully Blown" (featuring Snak the Ripper)	Datsik	4:13
3.	"Syndrome" (with Downlink)	Datsik, Downlink co.	4:31
4.	"Bonafide Hustler"	Datsik	4:24
5.	"Evilution" (with Infected Mushroom featuring Jonathan Davis)	Datsik, Infected Mushroom co.	4:51
6.	"Need You"	Datsik	4:37
7.	"Don't Feel Right"	Datsik	4:31
8.	"Light The Fuse"	Datsik	4:59
9.	"Complete Control"	Datsik	4:17
10.	"Punisher" (with Downlink)	Datsik, Downlink co.	4:31
11.	"Napalm" (featuring Messinian)	Datsik	5:24
12.	"Double Trouble" (with Z-Trip)	Datsik, Z-Trip co.	6:03
Total length:			56:21

• (co.) designates co-producer

== Charts ==
Chart (2012)	Peak position
US Heatseekers Albums	14
US Dance/Electronic Albums	12
