= Jonathan Davis =

American singer (born 1971)

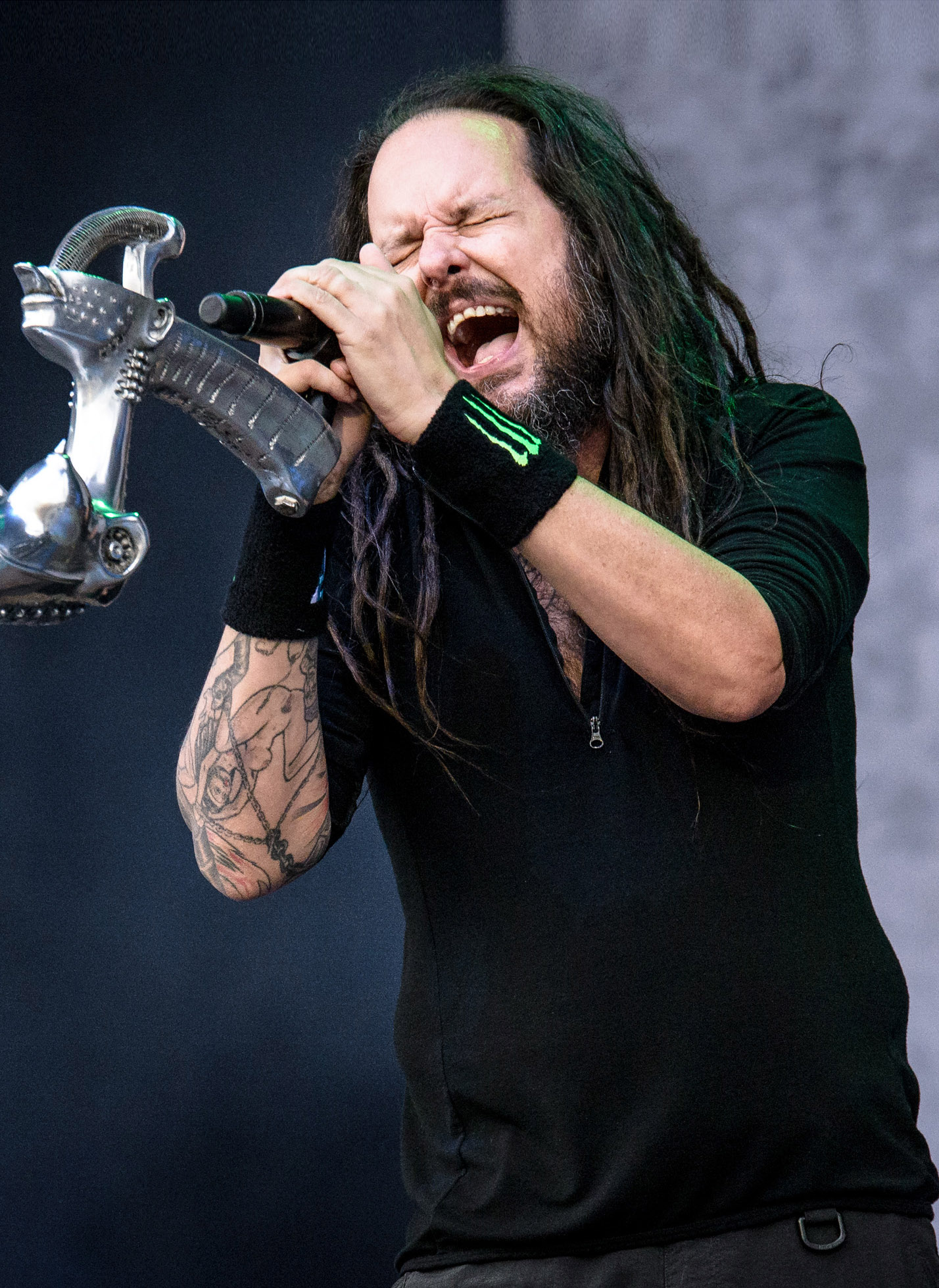
- Davis performing with Korn in 2016
- Born: Jonathan Howsmon Davis; January 18, 1971 (age 55); Bakersfield, California, U.S.
- Other names: JD; JDevil; J Devil
- Occupations: Singer; musician; songwriter; producer
- Spouses: Renee Perez (m. 1998; div. 2000) Deven Davis (m. 2004; div. 2016) Brittany Parisi (m. 2026)
- Musical career
- Genres: Nu metal; alternative metal; industrial metal; electronica; alternative rock
- Instruments: Vocals; bagpipes
- Years active: 1987–present
- Member of: Korn
- Formerly of: Killbot; Sexart; Jonathan Davis and the SFA
- Website: kornofficial.com

Jonathan Howsmon Davis (born January 18, 1971), also known as JD, is an American musician who is the lead vocalist and frontman of nu metal band Korn. A pioneering act of the nu metal genre, Korn's music along with Davis's distinctive personality have been noted as influences on later generations of musicians and performers.

Davis co-founded Korn in Bakersfield in 1993 with the dissolution of two bands, Sexart and L.A.P.D. He had led Sexart during his years as an assistant coroner. Davis rapidly gained notability for his intense and powerful live performances with Korn. From 2000 to 2001, Davis and Richard Gibbs wrote and produced the score and soundtrack album of Queen of the Damned, his first work outside the band. He began his side project called Jonathan Davis and the SFA in 2007 and continued to experiment with musical styles. He released his first solo album in 2018.

Davis is known for his personal, passionate lyrics and unusual tenor vocals. His vocals, which alternate from an angry tone to a high-pitched voice, switching from sounding atmospheric to aggressively screaming, have been the trademark of Korn throughout the band's career. He is also a multi-instrumentalist who plays guitar, drums, bagpipes, piano, upright bass, violin, and clarinet on occasion.

Davis has collaborated with various artists over the course of his career, ranging from metal to alternative rock, rap, world music, and electronic music. He has also mixed tracks and performed DJ sets as his alter ego, JDevil. For decades, Davis has been passionate about visual arts, horror films, comics and video games.

== Early life ==
Jonathan Howsmon Davis was born in Bakersfield, California, on January 18, 1971, the son of Holly Marie Chavez (née Smith; May 6, 1949 – February 25, 2018) and Ricky Duane "Rick" Davis (born December 14, 1948). His parents married on February 27, 1970. He is of English, German, Scottish, and Welsh descent.

He has a sister, Alyssa Marie Davis (born February 8, 1974), as well as a half-brother, Mark Chavez (lead singer of Adema; born November 15, 1978), and a half-sister, Amanda Chavez (born July 31, 1981) by his mother. His father was a keyboardist for Buck Owens and Frank Zappa, while his mother was a professional actress and dancer. His parents divorced when he was three years old. He lived with his mother at first, but, after experiencing bad situations at that home, he moved in with and was raised by his father and former stepmother in Bakersfield, but was made to feel like he "came in and ruined their perfect little family." Davis suffered severe bouts of asthma as a child. Asthma forced him to stay in the hospital every month from the ages of 3 to 10, and he survived a "critical asthma attack" when he was five years old; he said, "My heart stopped, and I didn't see no damn light or hear any music".

He attended Highland High School; however, he was persistently harassed for wearing eyeliner, baggy clothes, and listening to new wave music. He was constantly called homophobic names, which later inspired the Korn song "Faget". Davis's "HIV" tattoo on his upper left arm was also inspired by his experience of being bullied. At the age of 16, Davis found employment as a coroner's assistant; after graduating high school, he immediately enrolled in the San Francisco college's one-year coroner program. He enjoyed his time in San Francisco, where he spent his days poring over embalming textbooks and his nights living and working in funeral homes. Nevertheless, he dropped out after two semesters to apprentice at a mortuary closer to home, in the Kern County Coroner's Department. He was also a professional embalmer for a funeral home.

Davis commented in Kerrang!:

"I had post-traumatic stress from seeing dead babies, and young kids that had died after finding a parent's stash of drugs – shit that I shouldn't have been seeing at 16 or 17 years old. I had to have a lot of therapy to make the nightmares go away, but I got through it and it made me appreciate life a lot more."

He did not get along with his stepmother and has accused her of harassing him and giving him tea mixed with Thai hot oil and jalapeño juice to drink while he was sick. He also mentioned that she mixed tabasco with his tea. At that time, Davis had sexual fantasies about his stepmother, dreaming of "fucking her and killing her". Though she was later divorced by Davis's father, the Korn song "Kill You" was nonetheless written about her. In an interview for The Guardian, Davis said that he left home when he was 18 because he felt like "public enemy number one", since his stepmother—quoted as "twisted and sadistic"—hated him, and his own father was too embarrassed by the situation to do anything.

== Career ==
=== Early career ===
Davis formed his first group with other members in a mysterious formation called Buck Naked, of which only two songs were recorded on demo tapes and distributed to his friends in high school; including the new wave-influenced song "What I Have Done", and a love song titled "Come With Me". Davis, who worked by day in a mortuary, got free haircuts at a college where guitarist Ryan Shuck was a student. Davis agreed to join Shuck's group called Sexart, which was formed in 1991. Davis described the experience by saying "I had no clue what I was doing, I didn't know what the hell to do with my voice".

Early in 1993, ex-band members of L.A.P.D. who had started a new group named Creep, noticed Davis at The John Bryant club in Bakersfield, and were overwhelmed by his performance with Sexart. Davis, who was already a friend of Reginald Arvizu's, was reluctant to join Creep, although he was flattered by the obstinacy of the musicians to integrate him into the group. Nevertheless, he only made the decision to audition with Creep after meeting the psychic who told him that it would be beneficial for him to leave Bakersfield, move to Los Angeles and join them. Davis left Sexart in his early 20s after a convincing rehearsal with the four Creep members; he commented: "I was a little torn, because I was doing Sexart at the time, and that was my band. But I wanted to go and see what it was all about, and from the first note I was hooked. It just all clicked." Enticed by the prospect of a musical career, Davis resigned from his employment at Bakersfield judicial police, and moved to L.A. with his girlfriend to live with David Silveria and Brian Welch in the same house in Huntington Beach. Davis proposed the idea of naming the band as 'Corn'—the spelling would be renamed right after as 'KoЯn'—in reference to the horror film Children of the Corn and a sexually explicit story from his gay friend.

=== Solo career ===
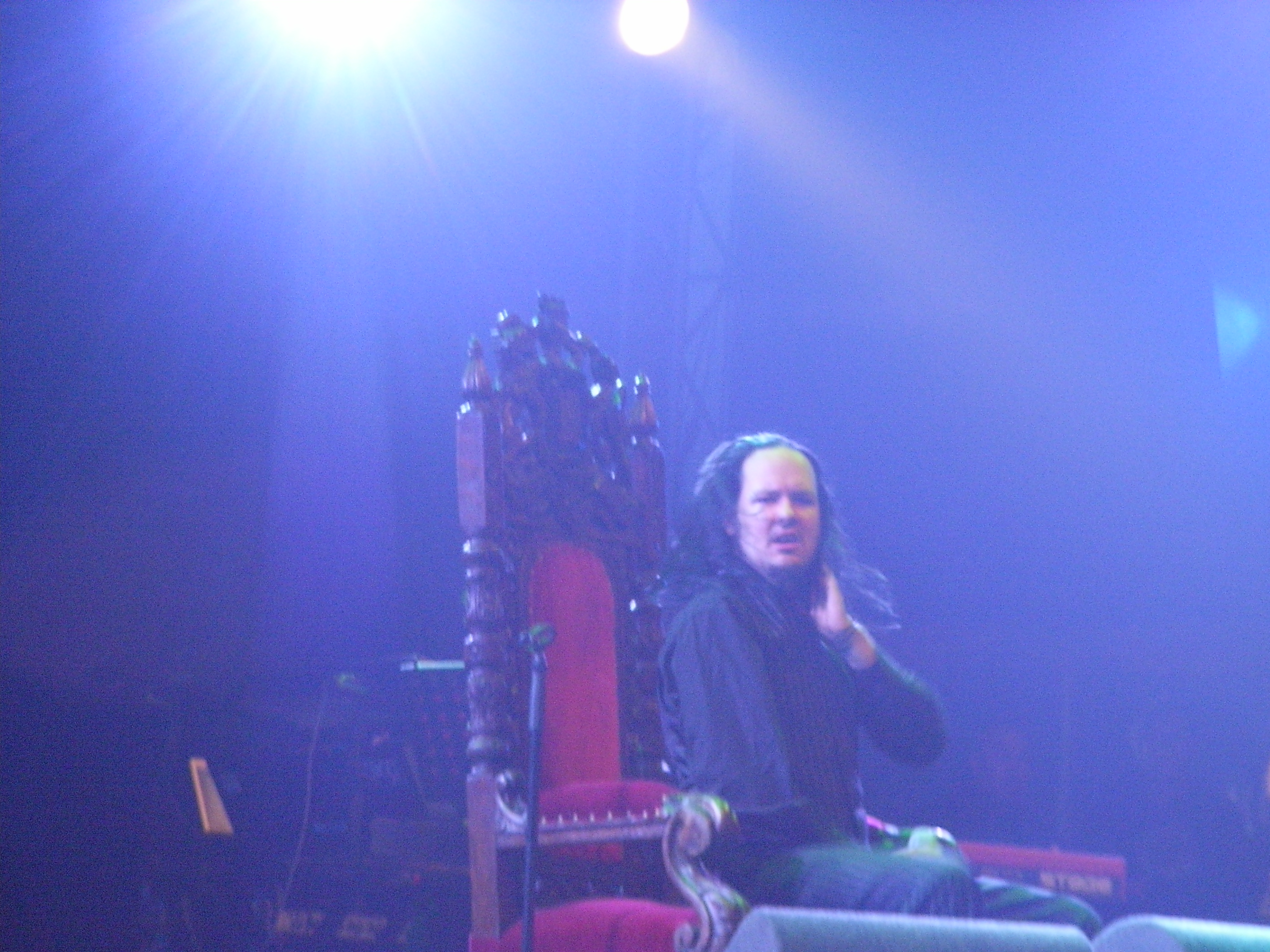
Davis and the SFA performing at Pinkpop festival in Netherlands in 2008

Davis first began working on a solo album in 2007, forming the group Jonathan Davis and the SFA (Simply Fucking Amazings). Although he released two live albums with the group, no studio albums were completed and the band disbanded in 2014 after the death of guitarist Shane Gibson.

In December 2017, Davis began announcing solo tour dates and festival appearances and the launch of his solo album planned for 2018, which would mark Davis's first billed simply as Jonathan Davis. He said of the album in a 2017 Louder Sound interview: "It's the Jonathan Davis And The SFA record, but JD SFA is no longer. Unfortunately, since Shane Gibson passed, that band's done and it can't be recreated. So this is J.D. right now."

In January 2018, Davis released his first solo single, "What It Is". On January 26, 2018, he released the music video for "What It Is", while the single was included on the movie's soundtrack for American Satan. At that time, Davis said he was "a big fan" of science fiction movies such as Blade Runner and Dune, and noted being an admirer of Vangelis. On May 25, 2018, he released his debut solo album, Black Labyrinth, on Sumerian Records. The writing process of Black Labyrinth—whose thematic focuses on "religion, consumerism and apathy"—was initiated on the road in 2007. Davis contributed mainly to the sound of the album, playing guitar, keys, and "anything else he could get his hands on to the record".

On October 1, 2020, Davis released an alternate country version of "What It Is".

On July 16 and 17, 2026, Davis performed a new orchestral arrangement of "Freak on a Leash" created by Japanese musician and composer Yoshiki during Yoshiki Classical 2026 at Walt Disney Concert Hall.

Solo band members

- Jonathan Davis – vocals
- Chris Nix – guitar
- Brian Allen – upright bass
- Sven Martin – keyboards
- Ray Luzier – drums
- Emilio "Zef" China – violin, rhythm guitar, backing vocals

=== JDevil ===
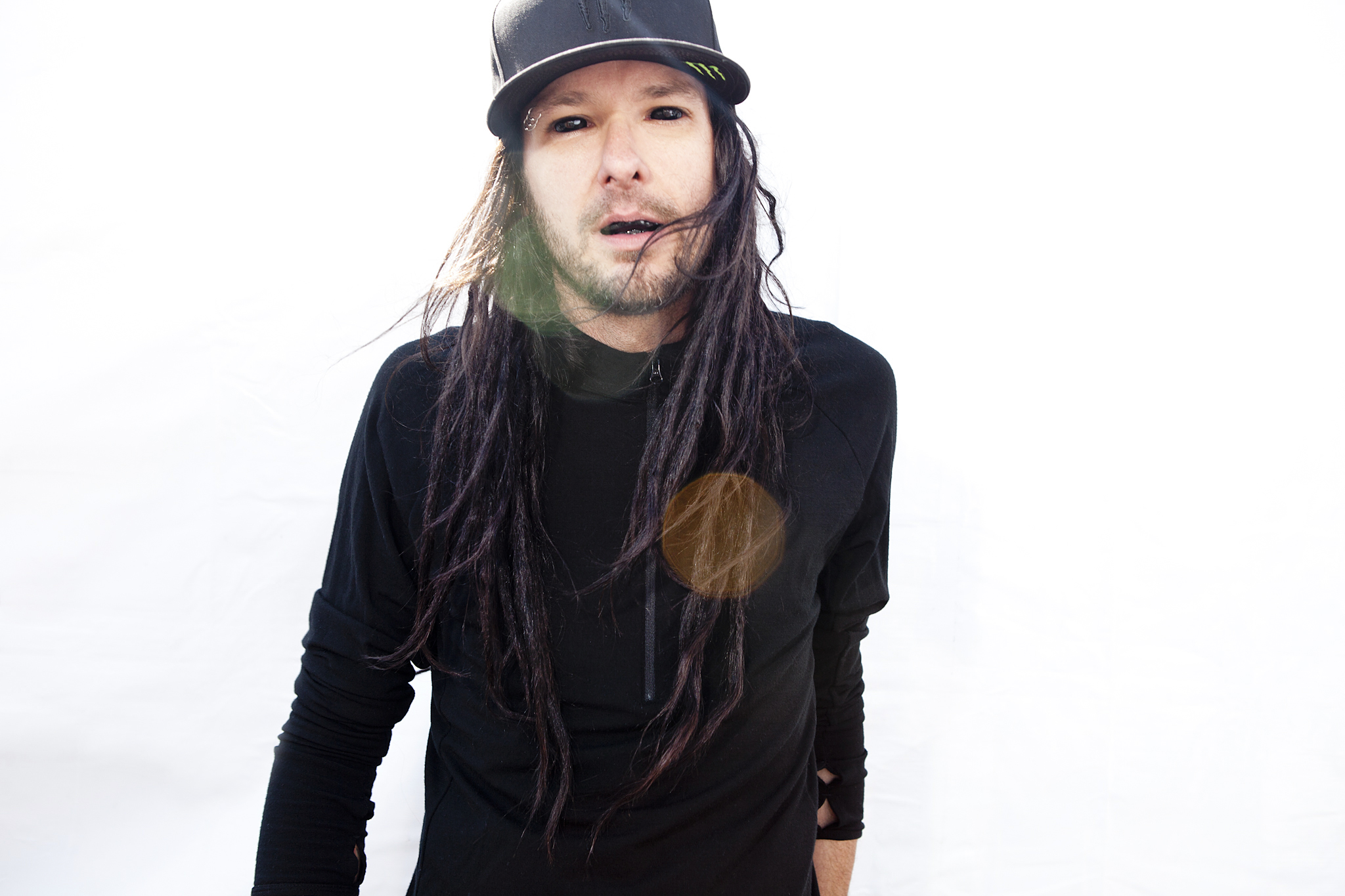
JDevil at I Love This City Festival, San Diego, 2012

JDevil is the EDM alter ego of Davis. He has been DJing since 1987 while he was still in high school. At 16, before he joined Korn, Davis started out as a DJ working for Pacific West Sound and spun at high school dances and parties on the weekends in Bakersfield. At the time, his teachers were C-Minus, Choc, and Eric and Vidal. He used to spin New York freestyle, Miami bass, old school hip hop, goth, and industrial.

In 2009, he began to DJ again and he introduced JDevil to the world in 2011 at Infected Mushroom appearances.

In 2012, JDevil collaborated with Sluggo and California producer Tyler Blue, and while touring, he started working on an EP and writing every night in the studio of his tour bus. In March 2012 JDevil collaborated with Datsik and Infected Mushroom on a song called "Evilution", the tracks would appear on Datsik's debut album Vitamin D. JDevil was one of the opening acts for Korn on their The Path of Totality Tour from November 2011 – July 2012 in North America and Europe. While on a short break from touring with Korn in July 2012, JDevil had a short four-day club tour which consisted of The Junkyard in Nashua, New Hampshire, Pufferbellies Entertainment Complex in Hyannis, Massachusetts, Lizard Lounge in Dallas, Texas, and The Garden in El Paso, Texas.

In July 2012, JDevil had signed on to perform at select Identity Festival dates throughout North America. He only performed at two shows, Comcast Center (amphitheater) in Mansfield, Massachusetts, and Jiffy Lube Live in Bristow, Virginia.

In 2012, JDevil was supposed to open for Rob Zombie and Marilyn Manson on their Twins of Evil Tour at select dates in North America, but had to drop out of the tour due to exhaustion. Davis stated it was very important for him to evolve in different styles after two decades in Korn, he said in Rolling Stone: "It keeps me motivated. It keeps me being creative and not getting bored with music." In October 2012, Davis released his EP with his new group called Killbot, the EDM collective including Sluggo and Tyler Blue.

=== Other projects ===
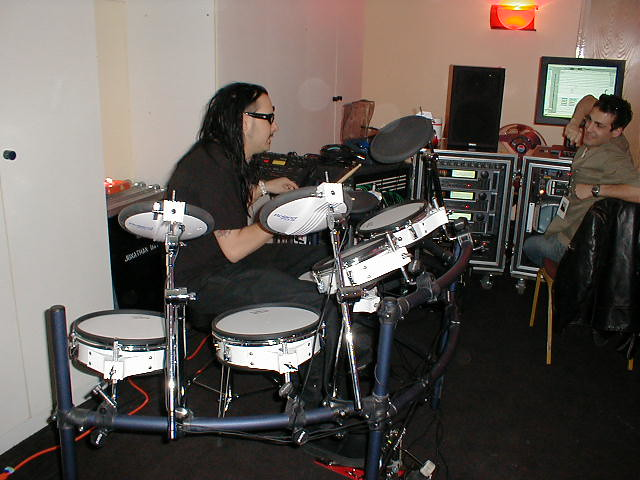
Davis and Toby Wright, composing on the road for the Queen of the Damned film soundtrack backstage at Wembley Arena, London, 2000

In the early 2000s, while on tour, Davis was looking for artistic hobbies to satisfy his creative impulses and decided to team up with composer Richard Gibbs to write film soundtracks. Davis and Gibbs were introduced to each other through Zomba Music Group, which published their respective music at the time. Shortly after, Warner Bros. asked them to work on the movie Queen of the Damned, an adaptation of Anne Rice's third novel in The Vampire Chronicles and a sequel to the 1994 film Interview with the Vampire. Ten songs will be composed by the two men, but only five have been kept. These songs include "System", "Redeemer", "Forsaken", "Slept So Long" and "Not Meant for Me", and sung by the band The Vampire Lestat in the movie. While Davis's voice is heard performing the songs in the movie, through the singing voice of Lestat, contractual obligations kept his vocals from appearing on the soundtrack album released in 2002. Aaliyah, who died during filming, was supposed to record a duet with Davis.

In 2000, he created an original fighting game, Pop Scars, which pits popular musical personalities against each other in one-on-one combat. Participants included members of Limp Bizkit, Staind, Marilyn Manson, and Korn itself. Each celebrity has its own personality and sports character designs sketched by comic book artist Marty Emond, while stages feature environmental traps that impede opponents as they fight. Pop Scars never made it past the early design stages, as Davis himself pulled the plug on the project in late 2004.

In 2002, Davis was hired by New Line Television to write and record the theme music of UPN's The Twilight Zone television series, hosted by Forest Whitaker.

In 2007, he recorded original songs with Korn for the video game Haze.

In 2011, Konami hired Davis and Korn to compose the theme song to the video game Silent Hill: Downpour, which led to an online petition to stop the pairing.

He also created the title track for the 2022 video game ELEX II.

== Cameo appearances and acting ==
Davis and Korn voiced themselves in season 3 of South Park in the episode "Korn's Groovy Pirate Ghost Mystery", which features them as characters inspired by the cartoon Scooby-Doo, driving a van similar to the Mystery Machine and trying to solve a mystery about pirate ghosts.

Davis has also been featured in many other bands' music videos, sometimes with Korn and sometimes solo. He has appeared with Korn in the Limp Bizkit music videos for "Break Stuff" and "Faith". He also appeared in the music video for "Fire" by Busta Rhymes.

In January 2000, Davis made an appearance at an Xtreme Pro Wrestling show as a guest ring announcer; he would be brought on by the host of that night's event to announce the next match and its participants, with it being Chris Candido vs Damian Steele.

He has a cameo in Queen of the Damned as a ticket scalper.

Davis plays a minor role as Ricky, a crack dealer, in the film Seeing Other People.

Davis and the rest of Korn appeared in a 2005 episode of the comedy-drama television series Monk, titled "Mr. Monk Gets Stuck in Traffic".

Davis also had a role as a store clerk in the 2007 independent film The Still Life.

In 2009, he collaborated with Infected Mushroom, appearing in the music video for their track "Smashing the Opponent".

In 2012, Davis appeared in the Datsik and Infected Mushroom music video for "Evilution", wearing black eye contacts and fake teeth.

In August 2017, Davis voiced Succulentus in an episode of OK K.O.! Let's Be Heroes titled "Know Your Mom". The character was based on Davis and a parody of the nu-metal genre in general. The character's dialogue consists of references to lyrics from nu metal songs.

In 2018, he also worked with the EDM group SKYND for their debut real crime song "Gary Heidnik", appearing in the music video for it as well.

In February 2023, he collaborated with Kim Dracula for the song "Seventy Thorns" and appeared in its music video.

== Artistry ==
=== Vocal ability ===
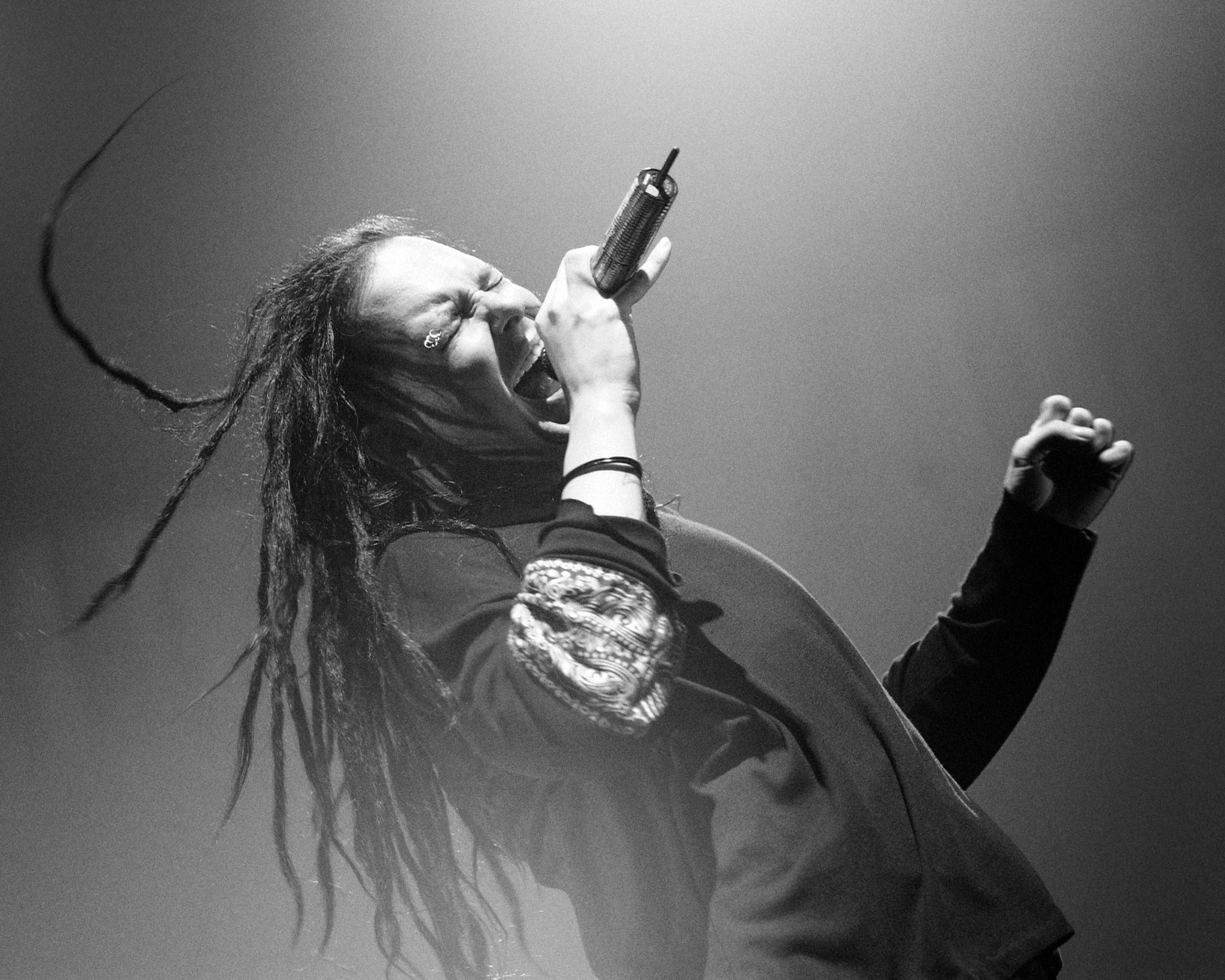
Davis displaying his range of vocals at a Korn concert in September 2002

Davis is a tenor with a vocal range of four octaves and four notes (from A 1 to E 6). The vocal analysis of The Range Place website lists his recorded register as peaking at the lower note F 5). (Note: The Range Place has been mentioned in USA Today, The Telegraph and Time.) In 2014, Davis appeared on the VVN Music's list of "the vocalists with the largest range". According to the vocal range data curated by The Range Place,

His bizarre and esoteric vocal styles are definitely one of the main trademarks of the band, ranging from a gruff distorted sound to an odd dissonant scat as well as a lesser used soft headier sound. Earlier on, he used his more distorted tone almost exclusively for highs, however later on around the time of See You on the Other Side he began demonstrating an ability to use more a cleaner which he can take to the lower fifth octave. His low range is fairly melodic down to at least F2/E2, with lower notes being more in the so-called "attitude fry" style, often used for a creepier or more intimidating effect. Davis's voice is definitely a factor in what most consider to make or break Korn's music for them, however he is definitely a unique staple of the 90s and modern rock scene.

Describing a live performance in Portland, Robert Ham of Billboard stated that "not enough can be said about the versatility of Davis's voice, as he explored all the different timbres at his disposal throughout the night. He growled, crooned and wailed with equal amounts of steady force". The Rough Guide to Rock writer Essi Berelian described Davis's singing voice: his "unusual style varied between singing, half-rapping and breathless shrieking". Davis is renowned for his guttural—scat singing breakdowns; author Christopher Krovatin wrote that "no aspect of Jonathan's vocals are more widely recognized that his babbled nonsense words reminiscent of the scat vocals used by classic jazz musicians like Duke Ellington, Ella Fitzgerald and Benjamin "Scatman" Crothers". Tracks that include this aspect of his vocals in chronological order include the lead-off track in Life Is Peachy "Twist", "Freak On A Leash", "Got The Life", "Children Of The Korn", "B.B.K", "Seed", "Bottled Up Inside", "Beat It Upright", "Open Up", "Liar", "Tension", "Rotting In Vain", "The Ringmaster", and "Worst Is On Its Way".

=== Influences ===
Davis has said that his earliest musical inspiration during his childhood was the Andrew Lloyd Webber musical Jesus Christ Superstar, as his mother was one of the dancers in the movie. His interest in music was more stimulated when he discovered his synth-pop heroes, Duran Duran and the melodies of Simon Le Bon who became his major influence. He also grew up listening to '80s music such as Arcadia, Sigue Sigue Sputnik; Bauhaus, Depeche Mode, Thompson Twins; Missing Persons and Flock of Seagulls. Upon listening to his favorite musical genre, Davis would later say, "I was a New Romantic! They even took me to the gay student's counselor just because I wore makeup". He bought Mötley Crüe's album Shout At The Devil when he was in seventh grade, then found Ministry, Skinny Puppy, and "old goth stuff" like Christian Death. Davis was first impressed with metal when he heard Vulgar Display of Power by Pantera, he stated it was "the metal record that made me wanna do heavy music". During adolescence, Davis played bagpipes on a regular basis. Many reviewers point out stark similarities between the vocals of Davis and several techniques employed by Mike Patton, and the former recognized Patton's bands Faith No More and Mr. Bungle as major influences.

=== Bagpipes ===
Davis was interested in pipe band music during his youth, which prefigured later Korn's use of bagpipes in several songs. His great-grandmother was from Scotland and played pipe records for him. Davis was also inspired to play the bagpipes by a scene in the 1982 film Star Trek II: The Wrath of Khan, in which the character Mr. Scott played "Amazing Grace" on the Great Highland bagpipes at the funeral of Mr. Spock. The melancholic sound captivated him. In a Loudwire interview, Davis described this moment while watching the film: "everybody tears up, and I'm like...I gotta play bagpipes".

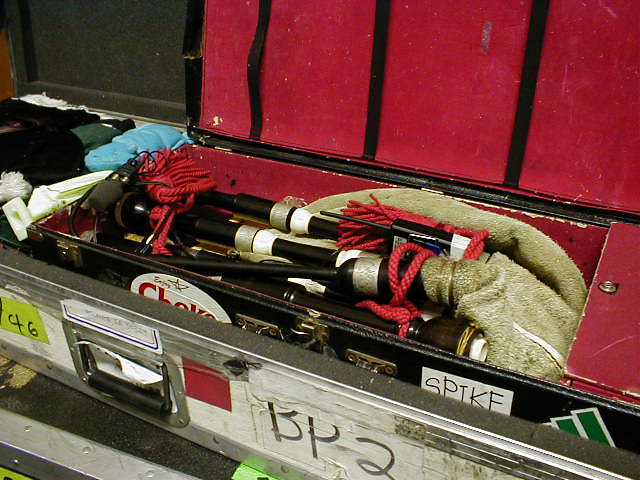
Davis's bagpipes backstage during the Issues Tour, at Hammersmith Apollo, England, 2000

Davis's enthusiasm led his grandmother to give him his first set of bagpipes, then he began by joining the Highland High School pipe band, and taking lessons from the band's Scottish conductor. Shortly afterwards he went to a qualified teacher, who went to Scotland and learned. Davis started competing after that, across the United States at established gigs. When the band were ready to record their first album of original material, they realized that something was missing during the recording of the song "Shoots and Ladders". What had begun as "a joke" turned out to be nothing less than an atypical element in the song, and would eventually become the first Korn song to feature a Highland bagpipe. (Note: Following the release of Korn's self titled debut album—recorded with his bagpipe trophies by his side—the singer would have two credits after his name in magazines: Jonathan Davis-Vocals & Bagpipes, also: Jonathan Davis-Vocalist/Bagpiper.)

Of Davis's composition with Korn, Kelsey Chapstick commented in Revolver Magazine,

"The bagpipe intro to 'Shoots and Ladders' was captured with Davis playing outside the studio, walking away from the mic [ ... ] While the bagpipe wails that open the song might like they were recorded on top of a mountain, Davis actually played them while walking past the back door of the studio while the microphone stayed stationary, giving the impression of a faraway player fading into the distance."

Davis does not want to make prominent use of the woodwind instrument and avoids what he worries might be gimmicked or over-use of the pipes. He clarified: "it depends the song, if I'm feeling like there's a spot where I could use it". Korn's repertoire containing Davis's bagpipes includes, "Shoots and Ladders", "Low Rider" (a cover of the song by funk rock band War) from Korn's album Life is Peachy. Bagpipes are also heard on "My Gift To You", "Dead", "Let's Do This Now", "10 or a 2-Way", "Open Up", "Liar", "Seen It All", "I Will Protect You", "Lead The Parade", "Spike In My Veins", "Bleeding Out", and "The End Begins". On November 15, 1999, at the Apollo Theater concert, the NYPD Pipes and Drums corps opened the show with "Dead". On July 23, 1999, Davis performed his bagpipe routine in front of more than 250,000 attendees during the Korn concert at the Woodstock Festival in New York in a long weekend of anarchy and uproar.

== Equipment ==
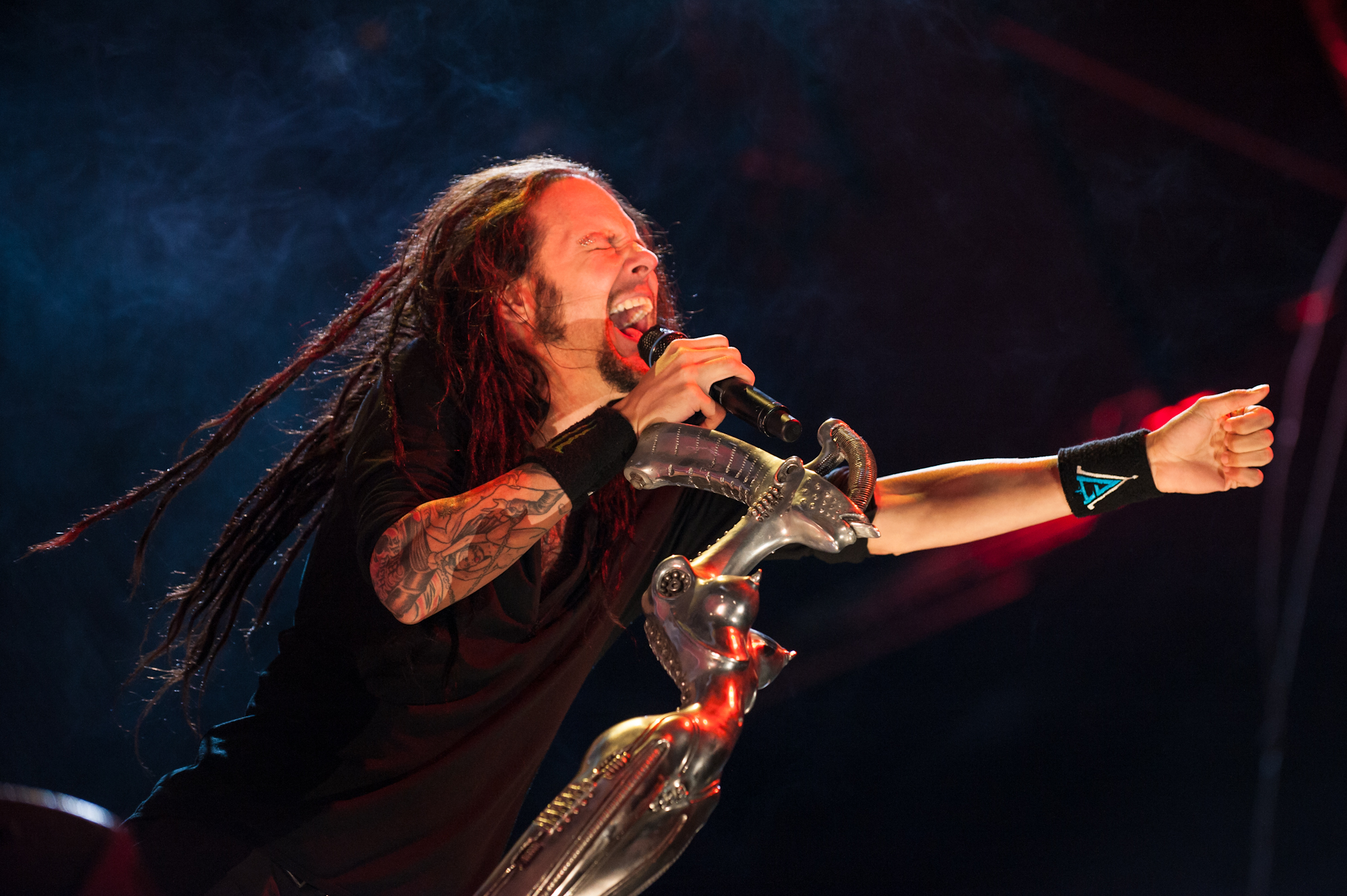
Davis using "The Bitch", August 2012

Three months before the release of Untouchables, in March 2002, during a South America tour, Davis unveiled a microphone stand art piece named "The Bitch", which was created and conceptualized by Swiss artist H. R. Giger. Davis being a fan of Giger's work, the initial idea of a special microphone stand was suggested to him by his personal assistant Jonathan Pavesi. Then, Davis contacted Giger and was pleased when the Swiss artist accepted a commission to come up with a design for the mic stand. He asked Giger for a microphone stand that was both "biomechanical and very erotic", giving him complete freedom of design. In 2000, during the European Issues tour, Davis visited the H. R. Giger Museum in Switzerland. Further discussions of Giger's drawings took place, and over time the figure became more streamlined. H. R. Giger and his assistant Roni emailed photos of the progress to the United States; during this process Davis gave his approval and asked him for some minor adjustments, so he could grab it more easily for his live performances. Giger said that Davis's only concern was that it had been "totally functional and as movable as possible". Only five bio-mechanical mic stands cast in the shape of a woman were manufactured at a foundry in Zürich, from molds that were then destroyed, adding to their historic allure and value. Davis had received three of the bio-mechanical microphone stands, and Giger kept the other two, one for permanent display at the H. R. Giger Museum and another for his gallery exhibitions.

"He had sculpted it out of clay, he sculpted the whole thing by hand, and as soon as I saw it I just fell in love with it. It was such an amazing experience. ... His influence is felt in the music. Korn's music is very dark and his art was dark, the two elements complement each other so well. You can't help but be inspired by someone that creative and with such a dark imagination. I don't know what else to say man, he was just a genius."

— Jonathan Davis, speaking of H. R. Giger in Louder Sound.

Davis has been sponsored by Shure microphones since the mid-1990s and continues to use them for live performances. He has used wireless KSM9 and KSM8 models in recent years. Davis uses a variety of microphones in the studio including the Telefunken U47 and ELA M 251.

== Personal life ==
=== Family ===
Davis's childhood is a major influence on Korn lyrics—the song "Daddy" gave rise to a rumor that he was molested by his father, Rick Davis. However, Jonathan has gone on record in many interviews saying he wrote the song about a female family friend who sexually abused him. He said that when he tried to turn to his family as a child to tell them about the abuse, they shrugged it off and did not believe him.

Davis has been married three times. His first marriage was to his high school sweetheart Renee Perez. They were married on November 28, 1998, had a son named Nathan (who also makes music under the alias Hi I'm Ghost) in 1995, and divorced in 2000. Jonathan married Deven Davis in 2004. The couple have two sons, Pirate and Zeppelin. He filed for divorce in October 2016, citing irreconcilable differences. In 2018, a domestic violence restraining order was issued blocking any child custody or visitation by Deven. Jonathan alleged Deven's profound drug addiction made her unsafe to be around their children. Deven Davis died soon afterwards on August 17, 2018, at the age of 39 of combined drug intoxication from heroin and various prescription drugs.

On July 3, 2026, Jonathan married jewelry designer Brittany Parisi in California. Ashlyn Robinnete of People Magazine writes the ceremony “was attended by 80 guests, and the aesthetic was influenced by Sandro Botticelli’s ‘The Birth of Venus’ painting, which Davis proposed in front of.”

=== Health and substance abuse ===
Davis had a history of excessive methamphetamine abuse and alcohol consumption during the recording sessions of Korn and Life Is Peachy. Subsequently, he recorded Follow the Leader under the influence of methamphetamine, cocaine, and a heavy reliance on alcohol (especially Jack Daniel's). In an interview with The Ringer, Davis described the album's creation "fueled by cocaine, speed, and just constant gallons of Jack Daniel's". (Note: The liquor bill for the three months of Follow the Leader recording sessions topped out at $60,000 in the amount of beer, and estimated at 2,000 bottles of Jack Daniel's.) Davis got himself off methamphetamine addiction when he was 28 during the fall's inaugural Family Values Tour. However, sobriety has increased his anxiety and depression which co-occurred with his substance use, exacerbated by the death of his grandfather around that time. During this period, from the late '90s to the early 2000s, Davis was put on suicide watch. In 2010, he admitted an occasional desire to resume substance abuse but added: "I know if I did (take drugs), I would be dead and I want to be with my children. It's a deterrent".

In 2013, Davis was treated for Xanax addiction, and openly smoked marijuana until 2015. In 2018, Davis stated in Forbes how he continues to struggle with chronic anxiety, depression, and insomnia, but has replaced drugs and alcohol with medication such as Prozac, Halcion, Benadryl, ZzzQuil, NyQuil, and melatonin.

On August 14, 2021, Davis tested positive for coronavirus. As a result, Korn postponed six summer dates on their U.S. tour and canceled two dates in New York. Korn resumed touring on August 27, 2021, at Tinley Park, Illinois, where the stage featured a custom throne for Davis to sit in. He was seen moving slowly around the stage, coughing, appearing to struggle catching his breath, and occasionally using supplemental oxygen. On August 29, Brian Welch posted a video remarking on his bandmate's health, stating, "Jonathan Davis is still struggling with the COVID after-effects. He's physically weak and having a mental battle. And any type of love, light and energy you can throw at him – prayers, all of it. ... He needs you more than ever."

=== Art and serial killers collectibles ===
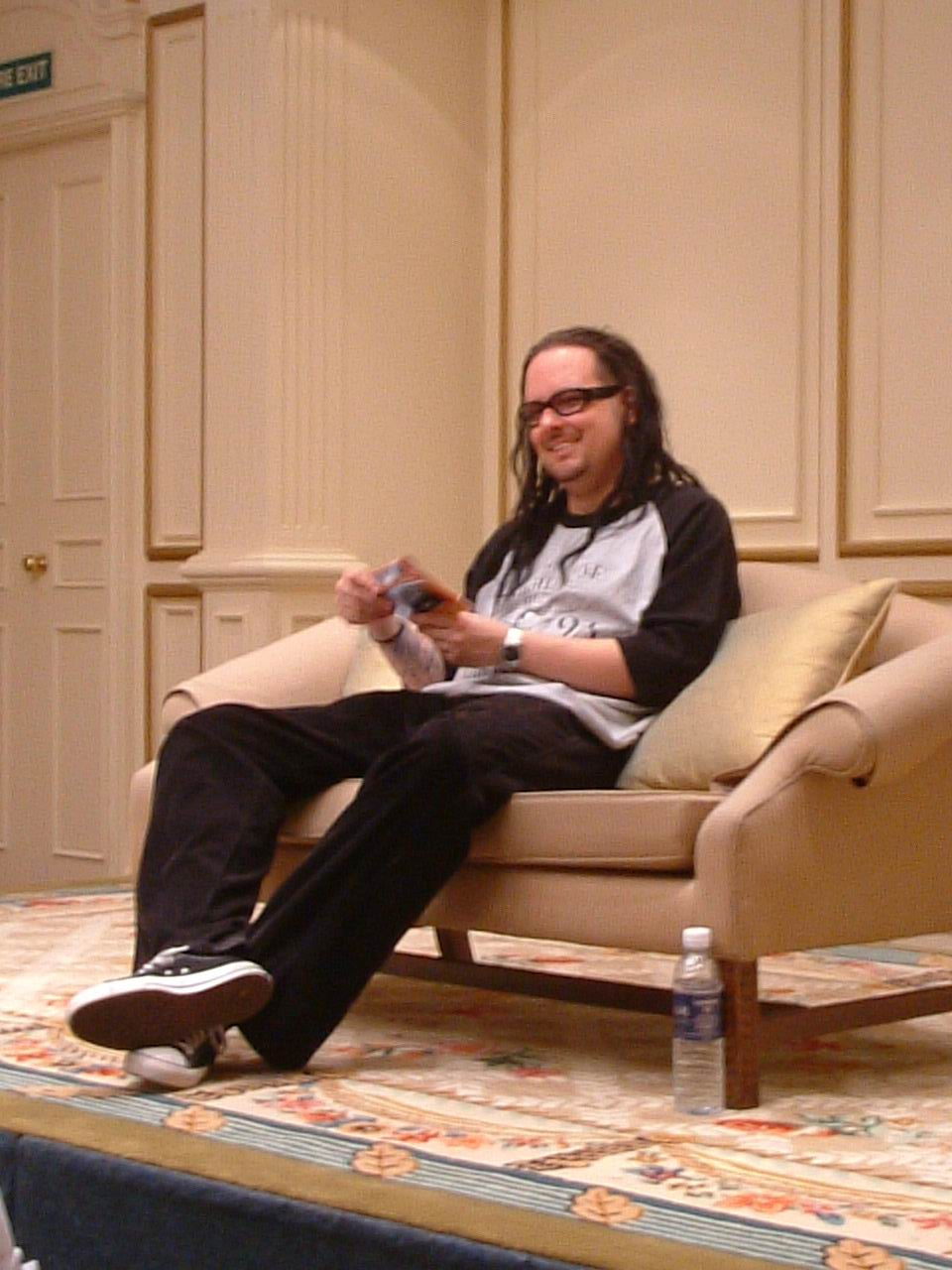
Davis in 2004, at the time he collected criminal artifacts

In the early 2000s, Davis began collecting serial killer art and memorabilia, publicly displaying selected items while on the Ozzfest 2003 tour. Some items owned by Davis include the Volkswagen serial killer Ted Bundy drove for the duration of his murder spree; the "Pogo" and "Patches" clown outfits worn by serial killer John Wayne Gacy; the 1928 confession letter from cannibal Albert Fish; and original drawings by serial killer Richard Ramirez (also known as the Night Stalker).

In June 2001, the collector of criminal artifacts Arthur Rosenblatt was approached by Davis. Rosenblatt told him of his plan to open a museum of artifacts related to the criminal justice system, which Rosenblatt suggested be named the Museum of Justice & Odditorium or MOJO Museum. In March 2003, Davis suggested funding the museum through a film or TV production. Subsequently, Davis pulled out of the deal which fell apart, leading Rosenblatt to sue him twice; Rosenblatt accused Davis of having spoken to the media in 2002 about his museum project with artist Joe Coleman and misnaming it American Curiosities Museum when he should have used the names provided for in the contract. In the lawsuit, Rosenblatt claimed that Davis and other partners have threatened his life on several occasions. Nevertheless, in December 2005, Davis started selling off his serial killer memorabilia, claiming his desire to move away from this environment, stating: "I don't want that around my kids". In 2006, the litigation was ultimately resolved successfully by Ed McPherson, Davis's attorney. Davis later denounced the items and got rid of them.

Davis made an appearance in the Oddities documentary series, in the fourth episode of season two titled "Rock Star Embalmer", which was filmed at Manhattan's Obscura Antiques & Oddities. The episode aired on Discovery Channel on April 30, 2011.

Davis's home houses a private art collection that spans decades of touring the globe. He has a considerable and diverse collection of works of macabre and dark art, such as a limited edition Ibanez guitar designed by H. R. Giger that looks the same as his mic stand, a human shrunken head from South America, and a human foetus called 'Luther'. His art collection also includes religious art from all over the world and a variety of religions, such as 600-year-old Buddhist sculptures and "tons of crucifixes", especially Mexican Jesus. "I wouldn't say I like religion, but I like the art", reaffirms Davis.

He has also developed an interest in collection of taxidermy art. In 2015 during an interview with Gavin Lloyd for Metal Hammer he said "the taxidermy I got on the walls, I got when we were touring in South Africa. I hired a guide, stalked those animals, shot both of them and donated the meat, which fed families for months. ... I had to wait a year to get those heads back from Africa, but they're top notch, they're amazing."

=== Political views ===
In 2006, Davis explained his political views, saying, "I'm political to a point where it affects human life, from global warming to abortion issues to my gun rights", but expressed no interest in issues like taxation, saying, "I don't really care. Obviously even going out and voting doesn't really count, it's all based down to these Electoral College votes." Davis has expressed support for same-sex marriage and transgender rights.

Davis has expressed support for libertarian Republican candidates Ron Paul and Rand Paul. Davis once described former U.S. President Barack Obama as an "Illuminati puppet", and told Billboard that Obama had "basically dragged this country down into the worst it's ever been." In 2014, Davis said that the United States was becoming a "police state". On the other hand, in 2006, Davis expressed opposition to U.S. conservatives, particularly American Christians, and he described Donald Trump's presidency as a sign that "the world is just absolutely out of control" in 2019.

=== Religion ===
In an interview with Metal Hammer magazine, Davis stated that he's "always been a believer in God", just not in organized religions. He also criticized born-again Christians for "broadcasting" their beliefs.

== Military visits ==
In 2012, Davis began visiting United States Armed Forces stationed in Europe. On March 16, 2012, Davis made his first visit to Ramstein Air Base, Germany where he visited with personnel assigned to the 86th Airlift Wing and Landstuhl Regional Medical Center. The Explosive Ordnance Disposal personnel showed him how to operate the bomb disposal robot and how to render safe an improvised explosive device wearing a Bombsuit. Firefighter personnel showed how to use the water cannon in the new Striker ARFF fire apparatus. Readiness and emergency management personnel showed a variety of chemical, biological, radiological, and nuclear (CBRN) detection and protection equipment. He also did a meet and greet signing autographs for the troops and their families at the AAFES Military Mall (Kaiserslautern Military Community Center). He visited wounded warriors from all over the world at Landstuhl Regional Medical Center and the USO Wounded Warriors Center.

On August 11, 2012, Davis made another trip to Ramstein Air Base, Germany to visit with personnel assigned to the 86th Airlift Wing, 37th Airlift Squadron, and Landstuhl Regional Medical Center. During this visit, he was able to get a tour of a C-130J, Hercules and Explosive Ordnance Disposal personnel demonstrated a "Hollywood shot" explosive and the destruction a small amount of explosive can do to a car. Again, he visited the wounded warriors at Landstuhl Regional Medical Center and the USO Wounded Warriors Center. A documentary of his experiences, "Wounded Warriors" was submitted to the 1st Annual GI Film Festival Hollywood, and won Audience Choice Award on November 10, 2012. As a result of these trips, once Barack Obama awarded Captain Florent Groberg the Medal of Honor, he mentioned how Davis visited Groberg in Germany, and joked that "I am not the lead singer from Korn". While Davis had been a vocal critic of Obama, he expressed shock at the mention, particularly as it was a compliment: "The President of the United States gave me props for being there for a Medal of Honor recipient. Groberg went through hell."

== Discography ==
=== Albums ===
Korn

- Korn (1994)
- Life Is Peachy (1996)
- Follow the Leader (1998)
- Issues (1999)
- Untouchables (2002)
- Take a Look in the Mirror (2003)
- See You on the Other Side (2005)
- Untitled album (2007)
- Korn III: Remember Who You Are (2010)
- The Path of Totality (2011)
- The Paradigm Shift (2013)
- The Serenity of Suffering (2016)
- The Nothing (2019)
- Requiem (2022)

Jonathan Davis and the SFA

- Alone I Play (2007)
- Live at the Union Chapel (2011)

Killbot

- Sound Surgery (2012)

Solo

- Black Labyrinth (2018)

=== Singles ===
==== As lead artist ====
List of singles, with selected chart positions, showing year released and album name
| Title | Year | Peak chart positions | | | | Album |
| Title | Year | US Dance | US Main. Rock | US Rock | US Rock Air. | Album |
|---|---|---|---|---|---|---|
| "Careless" | 2007 | — | — | — | — | Non-album singles |
| "Got Money" (featuring Jim Root) | 2008 | 41 | — | — | — | Non-album singles |
| "Silent Hill" | 2012 | — | — | — | — | Silent Hill: Downpour soundtrack |
| "What It Is" | 2018 | — | 5 | 47 | 21 | Black Labyrinth |
| "Everyone" | 2018 | — | — | — | — | Black Labyrinth |
| "Basic Needs" | 2018 | — | 19 | — | — | Black Labyrinth |
"—" denotes a recording that did not chart or was not released in that territory.

==== As featured artist ====
List of singles, with selected chart positions, showing year released and album name
| Title | Year | Peak chart positions | | | Album |
| Title | Year | US Main. Rock | US R&B | US Rap | Album |
|---|---|---|---|---|---|
| "Year 2000" (Xzibit featuring Jonathan Davis) | 2000 | — | 76 | 28 | Black and White soundtrack |
| "Smashing the Opponent" (Infected Mushroom featuring Jonathan Davis) | 2009 | — | — | — | Legend of the Black Shawarma |
| "The Enabler" (Chuck Mosley featuring Jonathan Davis and John 5) | 2009 | — | — | — | Will Rap Over Hard Rock for Food |
| "Evilution" (Datsik and Infected Mushroom featuring Jonathan Davis) | 2012 | — | — | — | Vitamin D |
| "Wake Up!" (Islander featuring Jonathan Davis) | 2017 | — | — | — | Non-album single |
| "Necessary Evil" (Motionless in White featuring Jonathan Davis) | 2017 | 29 | — | — | Graveyard Shift |
| "Gary Heidnik" (SKYND featuring Jonathan Davis) | 2018 | — | — | — | Chapter 1 |
| "Seventy Thorns" (Kim Dracula featuring Jonathan Davis) | 2023 | — | — | — | A Gradual Decline in Morale |
"—" denotes a recording that did not chart or was not released in that territory.

==== Promotional singles ====
List of promotional singles, showing year released and album name
| Title | Year | Album |
|---|---|---|
| "Justice" (Remix) (Rev Theory featuring Jonathan Davis) | 2011 | Justice |

=== Other appearances ===
==== Guest appearances ====
List of non-single guest appearances, showing year released and album name
| Title | Year | Album |
|---|---|---|
| "This Town" (Human Waste Project featuring Jonathan Davis) | 1994 | E-lux First Demo |
| "Lookaway" (Sepultura featuring Jonathan Davis, Mike Patton and DJ Lethal) | 1996 | Roots |
| "Sleepy Hollow" (Deadsy featuring Jonathan Davis) | 1996 | Deadsy |
| "Revival" (Orgy featuring Jonathan Davis) | 1998 | Candyass |
| "Ty Jonathan Down" (Videodrone featuring Jonathan Davis) | 1999 | Videodrone |
| "Nobody Like You" (Limp Bizkit featuring Scott Weiland and Jonathan Davis) | 1999 | Significant Other |
| "End of Time" (Q-Tip featuring Jonathan Davis) | 1999 | Amplified |
| "Take It Back" (Snot featuring Jonathan Davis) | 2000 | Strait Up |
| "Just for Now" (Fieldy's Dreams featuring Jonathan Davis) | 2002 | Rock'n Roll Gangster |
| "1stp Klosr" (Linkin Park featuring Jonathan Davis and The Humble Brothers) | 2002 | Reanimation |
| "Love on the Rocks" | 2003 | Wonderland soundtrack |
| "Cut Throat" (Marz featuring Jonathan Davis) | 2004 | Gorilla Pimpin' |
| "Jerry Bruckheimer" (The Changing featuring Jonathan Davis) | 2009 | For Obvious Reasons |
| "Witness the Addiction" (Suicide Silence featuring Jonathan Davis) | 2011 | The Black Crown |
| "Silent So Long" (Emigrate featuring Jonathan Davis) | 2014 | Silent So Long |
| "It's Time to Get Weird" (Sunflower Dead featuring Jonathan Davis) | 2015 | It's Time to Get Weird |
| "Starting to Turn" (Tech N9ne featuring Jonathan Davis) | 2016 | The Storm |
| "Whatever Goes Up" (Bone Thugs featuring Jonathan Davis) | 2017 | New Waves |
| "JD Fresh" (Fieldy featuring Jonathan Davis) | 2017 | Bassically |
| "Necessary Evil" (Motionless In White featuring Jonathan Davis) | 2017 | Graveyard Shift |
| "Gary Heidnik" (SKYND featuring Jonathan Davis) | 2018 | Chapter I |
| "Can't Wait" (Lakshminarayana Shankar featuring Jonathan Davis) | 2020 | Chepleeri Dream |

==== Remix work ====
List of remix work for other artists, showing year released and album name
| Title | Year | Other artist(s) | Album |
|---|---|---|---|
| "Hear Me Now" (Jonathan Davis Remix) | 2011 | Hollywood Undead | American Tragedy Redux |
| "Thunder Kiss '65" (JDevil Number of the Beast Remix) | 2012 | Rob Zombie | Mondo Sex Head |
| "The Kids Will Have Their Say" (JDevil Catholic Nun Remix) | 2012 | Steve Aoki, Sick Boy | The Kids Will Have Their Say EP |
| "Bug Party" (JDevil Catholic Nun Remix) | 2012 | Huoratron | Non-album song |
