= Datsik (musician) =

Canadian DJ and music producer (born 1988)

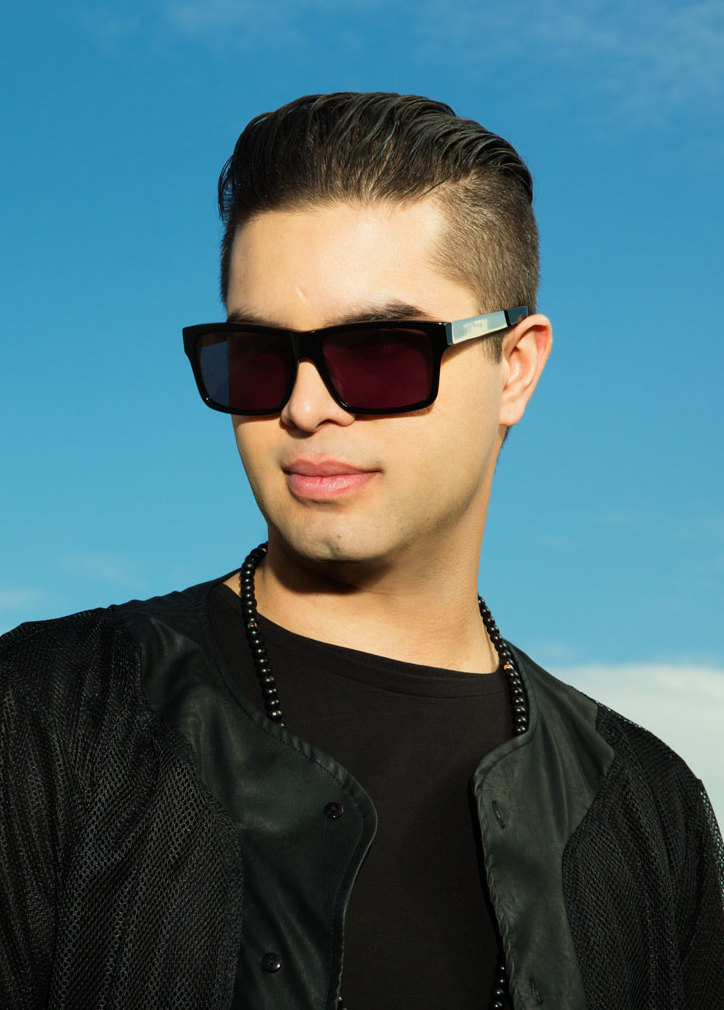
- Datsik no later than 2016

Background information
- Born: Troy Beetles; June 8, 1988 (age 38); Kelowna, British Columbia, Canada
- Origin: Kelowna, British Columbia, Canada
- Genres: Dubstep; drumstep; drum and bass; bass house; electro house; moombahcore; trap
- Occupations: DJ; record producer
- Years active: 2007–2018
- Labels: Firepower; Rottun; EX7; Smog; Dim Mak; Never Say Die; Last Gang; Mad Decent; Spinnin; Ultra
- Partner: Hannah Ross
- Website: www.datsik.com

Troy Beetles (born June 8, 1988), better known by his stage name Datsik, is a retired Canadian DJ and music producer. His first release was in the spring of 2009. He has since played at venues all over the world, including festivals such as Coachella, Ultra Music Festival, EDC Las Vegas, Stereosonic, Boonstock, Shambhala Music Festival, and Electric Zoo.

Beetles cited a wide range of musical inspirations, including Wu-Tang Clan members RZA and Method Man. He has described his sound as "dark and robotic", while trying to remain "funky and gangster" and "dirty".

== Biography ==
Beetles was born on June 8, 1988, in Kelowna, British Columbia, Canada. His stage name derives from his old Xbox Live gamertag. He began producing dubstep after seeing Excision perform at Shambhala in 2008. Soon afterward, the two began collaborating and released several tracks together in 2009 and 2010 on Excision's Rottun Recordings.

In 2009, Datsik had several number-one releases on Beatport. He had remixed and collaborated with artists including The Crystal Method, Noisia, Wu-Tang Clan, and Diplo, and has performed with Steve Aoki, Rusko, Bassnectar, Skream, DJ Craze, Benny Benassi and Nero, among others.

He released his debut album Vitamin D through Dim Mak Records and Last Gang Records on April 10, 2012. The album features 12 songs as well as appearances from Downlink, Z-Trip, Infected Mushroom, Jonathan Davis, Messinian and Snak the Ripper.

In March 2015, Datsik partnered with electronic music lifestyle brand Electric Family to produce a bracelet for which 100% of the proceeds are donated to Lupus Foundation of America, which works to cure and improve the lives of all that are affected by lupus.

In March 2018, Beetles was accused of sexual assault spanning multiple years, resulting in public backlash and cancellation of all Datsik appearances at upcoming shows and festivals. He officially stepped down from his label, Firepower Records.

In November 2019, Datsik broke his 18-month hiatus with a video uploaded to his Facebook page. In the video, he discussed plans to return to the music industry after having been staying in a live-in therapy facility.

In August 2020, amidst the COVID-19 pandemic, Datsik marked his return to music by posting four new songs from his album "Afterlife" on SoundCloud and YouTube.

== Personal life ==
Datsik has a partner named Hannah Ross. The couple has a son named Ronin.

== Firepower Records ==
Firepower Records
- Official logo for Firepower Records
- Founded: January 2012; 14 years ago
- Founder: Datsik
- Status: Inactive
- Genre: Bass music; Dubstep; Drumstep; Riddim; Trap
- Country of origin: United States
- Location: Los Angeles, California, U.S.
- Official website: firepowerrecords.com

Firepower Recordswas an American independent electronic music record label founded in January 2012 by Canadian DJ and music producer Datsik in Los Angeles, California. The label was home to artists such as Bear Grillz, Getter, Protohype, and Terravita.

According to former co-owner and label manager Sharra Grace Duggan, Datsik started the label to accommodate the increasing and burdensome quantity of music submissions he received from new and established artists, and to provide a place for them "to put music out that [Datsik] was really feeling and inspired by" and "that their opinions and ideas were important and not just pushed aside".

In December 2012, the label partnered with Ultra Music Festival to showcase a mix, DJ'd by Datsik, consisting of the label's current discography.

The company was incorporated as a Limited liability company (LLC) on May 23, 2014..

The record label usually sends a group of its artists to perform at venues at different countries such as in Brown Alley in Melbourne, Iris Presents in Atlanta, and Skyway Theatre in Minneapolis.

In March 2018, Datsik stepped down from Firepower Records, and relinquished control and operations over to Duggan (or delegated to members of the label's personnel) amid numerous sexual misconduct allegations. A week later the record label announced that it would donate all proceeds from its upcoming compilation EP to anti-sexual assault organization RAINN.

In April 14, 2022, Datsik regained control and ownership of the label via the record label's recent filing to the Secretary of State of California. While the record label has not made any official announcement addressing its inactivity since its most recent release published on October 25, 2019, it hasn't legally dissolved via its recent filing, thus, making the label inactive instead.

== Discography ==
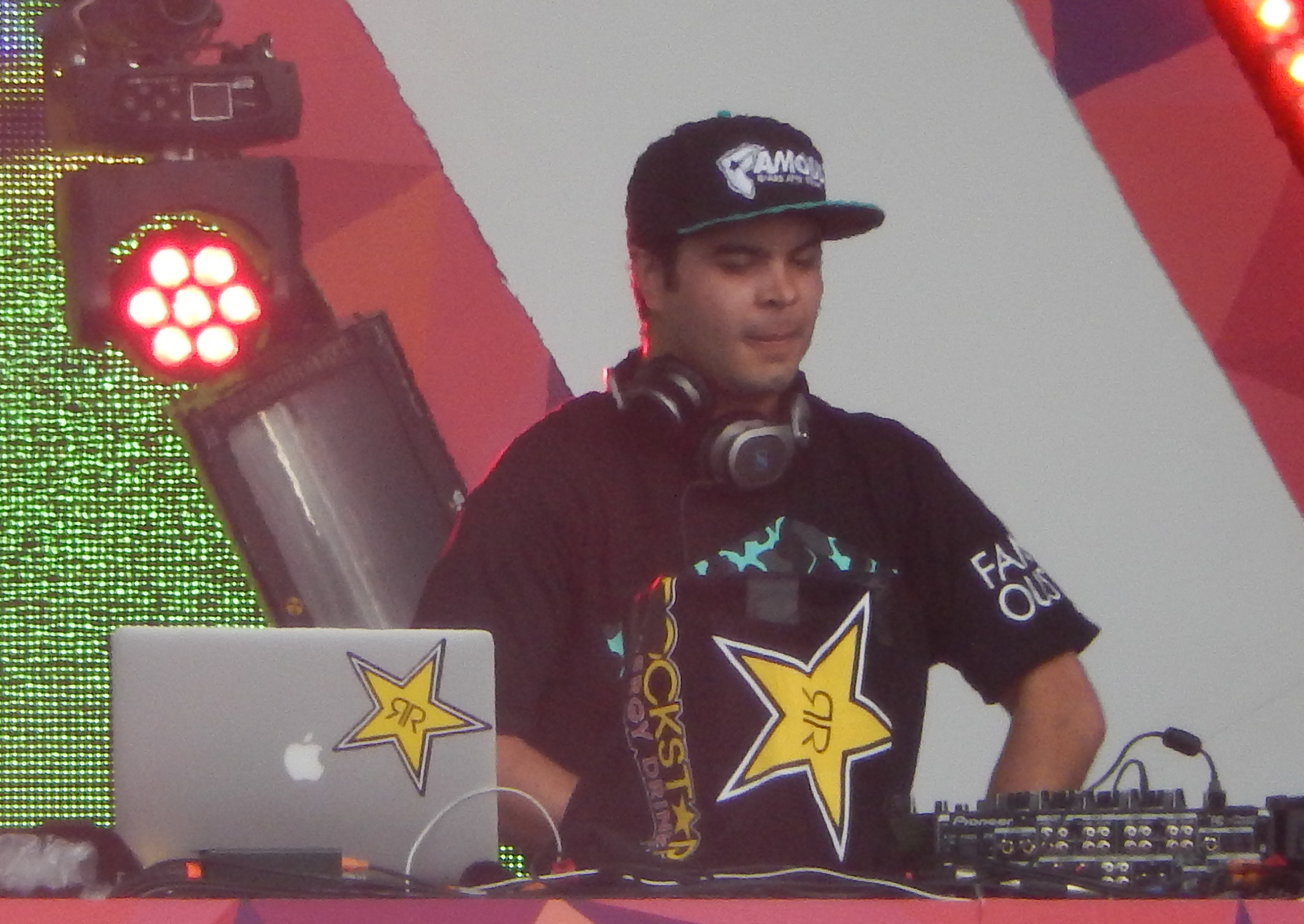
Datsik at Spring Awakening in 2014

Studio albums

- Vitamin D (2012)
- Let It Burn LP (2013)
- Sensei (2016)
- Afterlife LP (2023)
