= Fieldy =

American bassist (born 1969)

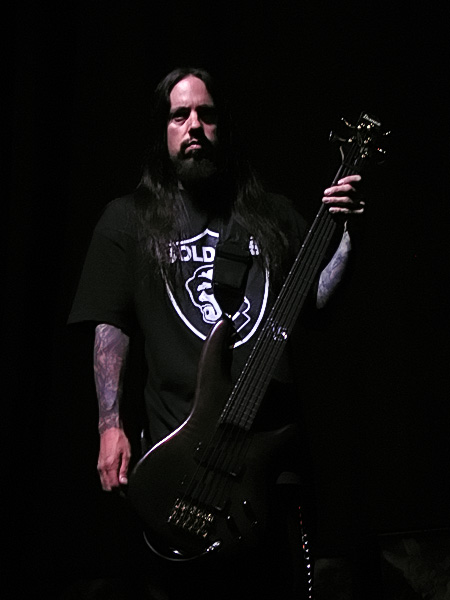
- Fieldy in 2006

Background information
- Also known as: Fieldy; Reggie; Fieldy Snuts; Dog
- Born: Reginald Quincy Arvizu; November 2, 1969 (age 57); Bakersfield, California, U.S.
- Genres: Nu metal; alternative metal; funk metal; hard rock; hip hop; G-funk; rap rock
- Occupation: Musician
- Instruments: Bass; guitar
- Years active: 1989–present
- Member of: Stillwell
- Formerly of: Korn; L.A.P.D.; Fieldy's Dreams

Reginald Quincy Arvizu (born November 2, 1969), also known as Fieldy, is an American musician, best known as the former bassist for nu metal band Korn from 1993 to 2021. He is also the guitarist/bassist for rock band Stillwell.

== Career ==
Arvizu and future Korn bandmate Brian Welch had played together in a number of bands, having become friends while still at school in Bakersfield, California. Upon their graduation from high school, Arvizu and Welch, along with two more future Korn members James Shaffer and David Silveria, relocated from Bakersfield to Los Angeles. In various permutations they played in the band L.A.P.D. Although L.A.P.D. did succeed in signing a record deal, their success was limited until the band hired singer Jonathan Davis and changed their name to Korn.

The name "Fieldy" is said to have come about as an inside joke. Originally, his bandmates called him "Gopher", due to his large cheeks. Gopher quickly became "Gar", Gar became "Garfield" (based on the comic strip character of the same name), and eventually "Gar" was dropped and a "y" was added to "Field", which became Fieldy.

In August 2012, it was reported that Fieldy would be taking a brief break from Korn as his wife Dena was expecting a child. Korn continued touring with fill-in bassist Ryan Martinie from Mudvayne.

On June 21, 2021, Fieldy announced that he would not be accompanying Korn on their upcoming tour, later taking an indefinite leave of absence from the band for personal reasons. In May 2025, Fieldy stated that he hadn't spoken to Korn since 2019 and doesn't anticipate reuniting with them anytime soon. In April 2026, during an appearance on the Shady Characters podcast with former L.A.P.D. bandmate Richard Morill, Fieldy offered further insight into his departure from the band, stemming in large part from the COVID-19 pandemic and his decision not to get vaccinated. Fieldy further went on to address his potential future with Korn, saying: "I'm retired from Korn today, but we'll see what the day brings tomorrow".

== Other ventures ==
In addition to Korn, Fieldy had a rap side project called Fieldy's Dreams which released the album Rock'n Roll Gangster in 2002. Most of the lyrics and music were by Fieldy, with Polar Bear (of Infinite Mass) helping out with the rest. The song "Baby Hugh Hef" placed tenth on a list of the "50 Worst Songs of the '00s" in a 2009 Village Voice article. Fieldy stated that the project's intended second album would explore hardcore rap but it was scrapped.

Fieldy's Dreams was dissolved in 2003 and relaunched under the name Fieldy's Nightmare in 2008. A planned album called Sobriety, intended to be a bass instrumental album in the funk and jazz fusion styles, was scrapped so Fiedly could focus on his work with Korn.

Fieldy also launched his own clothing line called Immanuel One Twenty Three, later saying that it was "much harder than he had previously expected" to start a clothing line. He released the memoir Got The Life: My Journey of Addiction, Faith, Recovery and Korn in 2009. The book tells the story of how he found God, quit drugs, and found the better part of himself.

Fieldy later worked with independent rap artist Q-Unique on the side project Stillwell. The band's debut album, Dirtbag, released in 2011. Fieldy's bass instrumental album was released under the title Bassically in 2017. Fieldy has five children: two daughters from his second marriage and three children from his current marriage. Following the death of his father, Fieldy became a born again Christian.

== Equipment ==
Fieldy plays a five-string Ibanez model SDGR SR1305, named the K-5, which is his signature bass. He uses DR Strings. His playing style consists of bass-slapping, standard finger-style plucking, left-hand muting, and an ultra-scooped tone. His standard tuning is: A, D, G, C, F. He states Flea of the Red Hot Chili Peppers as being one of the main influences towards his playing style. He has also stated to have been influenced by Billy Gould from Faith No More, Cliff Burton from Metallica and Les Claypool of Primus.

== Discography ==
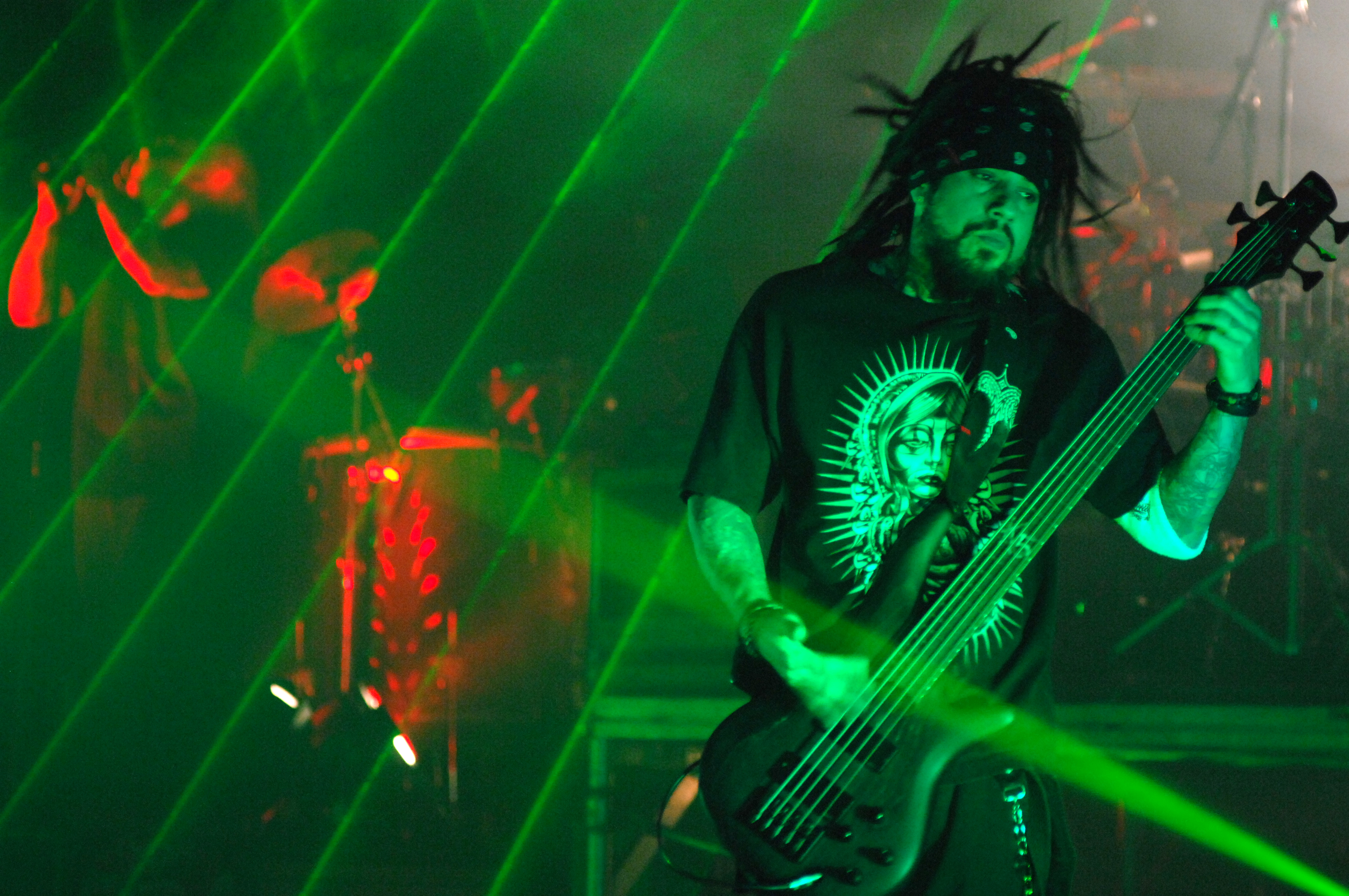
Fieldy in Italy 2008

- Rock'n Roll Gangster (2002)
- Bassically (2017)

== Other appearances ==
- Various artists – "A Song for Chi" (August 28, 2009)
- Videodrone – Videodrone (February 23, 1999)

=== Guest appearances (videos) ===
- Limp Bizkit – "Faith" (1998)
- Ice Cube – "Fuck Dying" (1999)
- E-40 feat. Fabolous – "Automatic" (2002)
- Bubba Sparxxx – "Back in the Mud" (2003)
- Lil Wayne – "Prom Queen" (2009)

== Bibliography ==
- Got the Life (March 10, 2009)
