= Korn discography =

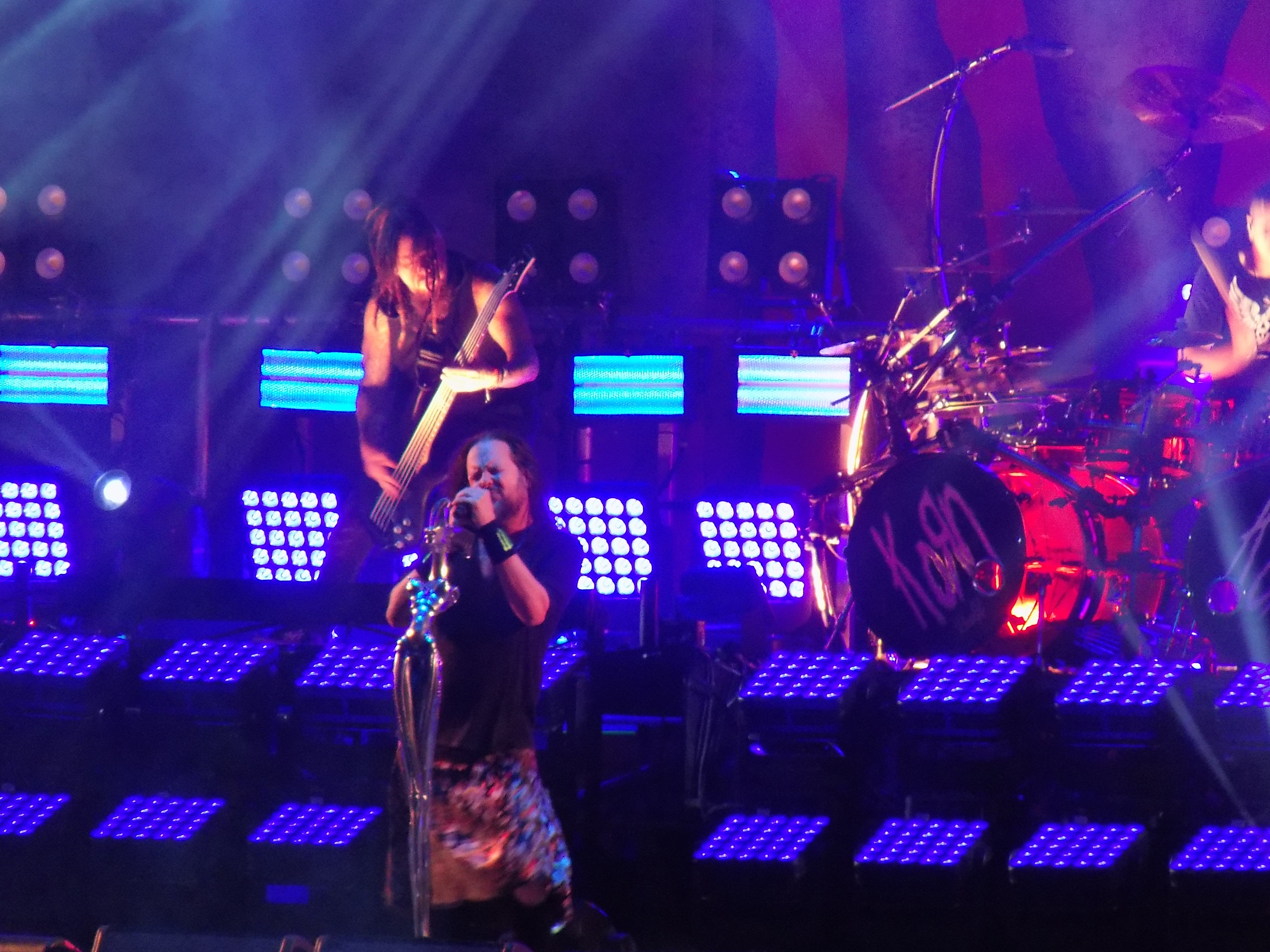
- Korn in 2017
- Studio albums: 14
- Extended plays: 6
- Live albums: 3
- Compilation albums: 8
- Singles: 47
- Video albums: 7
- Music videos: 53
- Promotional singles: 16

The discography of American nu metal band Korn consists of 14 studio albums, three live albums, eight compilation albums, seven video albums, six extended plays, 47 singles, 16 promotional singles and 53 music videos. Ten releases have gone platinum, and two gold. 15 releases have charted in the top 10 in the United States.

== Albums ==
=== Studio albums ===
List of studio albums, with selected chart positions and certifications
Title	Details	Peak chart positions										Certifications
Title	Details	US	AUS	AUT	CAN	FIN	GER	NLD	NZ	SWE	UK	Certifications
Korn	Released: October 11, 1994 (US); Label: Immortal, Epic; Formats: CD, cassette, LP, digital download	72	46	—	30	—	—	56	10	—	181	RIAA: 2× Platinum; ARIA: Platinum; BPI: Gold; RMNZ: Platinum
Life Is Peachy	Released: October 15, 1996 (US); Label: Immortal, Epic; Formats: CD, cassette, LP, digital download	3	26	21	32	24	85	87	1	43	32	RIAA: 2× Platinum; ARIA: Platinum; BPI: Gold; MC: Gold; RMNZ: Gold
Follow the Leader	Released: August 18, 1998 (US); Label: Immortal, Epic; Formats: CD, cassette, LP, digital download	1	1	7	1	4	12	7	1	24	5	RIAA: 5× Platinum; ARIA: 3× Platinum; BPI: Gold; MC: 3× Platinum; NVPI: Gold; RMNZ: Platinum; SNEP: Gold
Issues	Released: November 16, 1999 (US); Label: Immortal, Epic; Formats: CD, cassette, LP, digital download	1	1	13	2	4	9	13	2	42	37	RIAA: 3× Platinum; ARIA: 2× Platinum; BPI: Gold; BVMI: Gold; MC: 2× Platinum; NVPI: Gold; RMNZ: Platinum
Untouchables	Released: June 11, 2002 (US); Label: Immortal, Epic; Formats: CD, cassette, LP, digital download	2	2	2	3	3	1	13	4	7	4	RIAA: Platinum; ARIA: Platinum; BPI: Gold; RMNZ: Gold
Take a Look in the Mirror	Released: November 21, 2003 (US); Label: Immortal, Epic; Formats: CD, cassette, LP, digital download	9	37	2	—	10	8	21	19	18	53	RIAA: Platinum; ARIA: Gold; BPI: Silver; BVMI: Gold
See You on the Other Side	Released: December 6, 2005 (US); Label: Virgin; Formats: CD, LP, digital download	3	19	7	17	18	12	37	8	35	71	RIAA: Platinum; ARIA: Gold; BPI: Silver; BVMI: Gold; MC: Gold; RMNZ: Platinum
Untitled	Released: July 31, 2007 (US); Label: Virgin; Formats: CD, LP, digital download	2	11	3	5	2	3	32	3	17	15	RIAA: Gold
Korn III: Remember Who You Are	Released: July 13, 2010 (US); Label: Roadrunner; Formats: CD, LP, digital download	2	8	3	4	14	4	20	5	23	23	
The Path of Totality	Released: December 6, 2011 (US); Label: Roadrunner; Formats: CD, digital download	10	32	24	42	36	28	81	28	53	68	
The Paradigm Shift	Released: October 8, 2013 (US); Label: Prospect Park, Caroline; Formats: CD, LP, digital download	8	7	7	9	22	7	38	22	60	16	BPI: Gold
The Serenity of Suffering	Released: October 21, 2016; Label: Roadrunner; Formats: CD, LP, digital download	4	5	6	7	8	3	27	9	23	9	
The Nothing	Released: September 13, 2019; Label: Roadrunner, Elektra; Formats: CD, LP, digital download	8	5	7	11	13	6	24	10	60	9	
Requiem	Released: February 4, 2022; Label: Loma Vista; Formats: CD, LP, cassette, digital download	14	1	4	27	6	2	35	—	— (Note: Requiem did not enter the Official Swedish Charts, but peaked at number 8 on the Swedish Hard Rock Albums Chart.)	8	
"—" denotes a recording that did not chart or was not released in that territory.

=== Live albums ===
List of live albums, with selected chart positions
Title	Details	Peak chart positions									
Title	Details	US	AUS	AUT	CAN	FRA	GER	NLD	NZ	SWI	UK
Live & Rare	Released: May 9, 2006 (US); Label: Immortal, Epic; Formats: CD, digital download	51	—	38	—	100	72	—	—	64	193
MTV Unplugged	Released: March 6, 2007 (US); Label: Virgin; Formats: CD, digital download	9	45	10	21	60	23	54	11	48	131
The Path of Totality Tour – Live at the Hollywood Palladium	Released: September 4, 2012 (US); Label: Shout! Factory; Formats: CD, DVD, Blu-ray	—	—	—	—	—	—	—	—	—	—
Requiem Mass	Released: February 3, 2023 (US); Label: Loma Vista; Formats: CD, LP	—	—	—	—	—	—	—	—	—	—
"—" denotes a recording that did not chart or was not released in that territory.

=== Compilation albums ===
List of compilation albums, with selected chart positions and certifications
Title	Details	Peak chart positions										Certifications
Title	Details	US	AUS	AUT	CAN	FIN	GER	NLD	NOR	NZ	UK	Certifications
Greatest Hits Vol. 1	Released: October 5, 2004 (US); Label: Immortal, Epic; Formats: CD, LP, digital download	4	8	10	6	20	17	60	12	3	22	RIAA: Platinum; ARIA: Gold; BPI: Gold; BVMI: Platinum; RMNZ: Platinum
Chopped, Screwed, Live and Unglued	Released: September 26, 2006 (US); Label: Virgin; Formats: 2×CD+DVD	—	—	—	—	—	—	—	—	27	—	
Playlist: The Very Best of Korn	Released: April 29, 2008 (US); Label: Legacy; Formats: CD, digital download	—	—	—	—	—	—	—	—	—	—	
Super Hits	Released: February 24, 2009 (US); Label: Sony; Formats: CD, digital download	—	—	—	—	—	—	—	—	—	—	
Korn: Collected	Released: March 9, 2009 (US); Label: Sony; Formats: CD, digital download	—	—	—	—	—	—	—	—	—	—	
The Music of Korn	Released: September 29, 2009 (US); Label: Epic, Legacy; Formats: CD, digital download	—	—	—	—	—	—	—	—	—	—	
The Essential Korn	Released: May 10, 2011 (US); Label: Epic, Legacy; Formats: CD, digital download	—	—	—	—	—	—	—	—	—	—	
Falling Away from Me: The Best of Korn	Released: October 24, 2011 (US); Label: Sony; Formats: CD, digital download	—	—	—	—	—	—	—	—	—	—	
"—" denotes a recording that did not chart or was not released in that territory.

=== Demo albums ===
Year	Title
1993	Neidermayer's Mind

=== Unfinished albums ===
List of unfinished albums
Title	Album details
Korn Kovers	Unreleased

== Extended plays ==
List of extended plays, with selected chart positions
Title	Details	Peak chart positions			
Title	Details	US Digi.	SCO	UK	UK Rock
All Mixed Up	Released: February 9, 2001 (US); Label: Resource; Formats: CD	—	97	99	9
The Other Side, Pt. 1	Released: October 25, 2005 (US); Label: Virgin; Formats: Digital download	15	—	—	—
The Other Side, Pt. 2	Released: November 15, 2005 (US); Label: Virgin; Formats: Digital download	8	—	—	—
Digital EP #1	Released: September 28, 2009 (US); Label: Self-released; Formats: Digital download	—	—	—	—
Digital EP #2	Released: July 26, 2010 (US); Label: Self-released; Formats: Digital download	—	—	—	—
Digital EP #3	Released: December 13, 2010 (US); Label: Self-released; Formats: Digital download	—	—	—	—
"—" denotes a recording that did not chart or was not released in that territory.

== Singles ==
=== 1990s ===
List of singles released in the 1990s, with selected chart positions and certifications, showing year released and album name
Title	Year	Peak chart positions										Certifications	Album
Title	Year	US Bub.	US Alt.	US Main. Rock	AUS	EU	GER	ICE	NLD	SCO	UK	Certifications	Album
"Blind"	1994	—	— (Note: "Blind" peaked number forty nine on the US Alternative 50 Radio & Records chart in 1995, but did not enter the Billboard Alternative Airplay chart.)	—	—	—	—	—	—	—	—	BPI: Silver; RMNZ: Gold	Korn
"Need To"	1995	—	—	—	—	—	—	—	—	—	—		Korn
"Shoots and Ladders"	1995	—	— (Note: "Shoots and Ladders" peaked number forty one on the US Alternative 50 Radio & Records chart in 1996, but did not enter the Billboard Alternative Airplay chart.)	— (Note: "Shoots and Ladders" peaked number fifty on the US Active Rock 50 Radio & Records chart in 1996, but did not enter the Billboard Mainstream Rock chart.)	—	—	—	—	—	—	—		Korn
"Clown"	1996	—	—	—	—	—	—	—	—	—	—		Korn
"No Place to Hide"	1996	—	— (Note: "No Place to Hide" peaked number forty on the US Alternative 50 Radio & Records chart in 1996, but did not enter the Billboard Alternative Airplay chart.)	— (Note: "No Place to Hide" peaked number forty one on the US Active Rock Top 50 Radio & Records chart in 1996, but did not enter "Billboard Mainstream Rock Airplay" chart.)	—	70	—	—	—	22	26		Life Is Peachy
"A.D.I.D.A.S."	1997	13	—	—	45	87	—	—	—	27	22		Life Is Peachy
"Good God"	1997	—	—	—	81	—	—	—	—	23	25		Life Is Peachy
"All in the Family" (featuring Fred Durst)	1998	—	—	—	—	—	—	10	—	—	—		Follow the Leader
"Got the Life"	1998	—	17	15	26	94	—	1	—	21	23	ARIA: Gold; BPI: Silver; RMNZ: Platinum	Follow the Leader
"Freak on a Leash"	1999	6	6	10	22	55	58	15	23	23	24	ARIA: Gold; BPI: Platinum; RMNZ: 2× Platinum	Follow the Leader
"Falling Away from Me"	1999	8	7	7	62	90	86	1	77	25	24	BPI: Silver; RMNZ: Platinum	Issues
"—" denotes a recording that did not chart or was not released in that territory.

=== 2000s ===
List of singles released in the 2000s, with selected chart positions and certifications, showing year released and album name
Title	Year	Peak chart positions										Certifications	Album
Title	Year	US	US Alt.	US Main. Rock	AUS	AUT	GER	IRL	NLD	SWI	UK	Certifications	Album
"Make Me Bad"	2000	— (Note: "Make Me Bad" did not enter the Billboard Hot 100, but peaked at number 14 on the Bubbling Under Hot 100 chart.)	7	9	98	—	—	—	—	—	25		Issues
"Here to Stay"	2002	72	4	4	12	44	35	15	58	34	12	ARIA: Gold; BPI: Silver	Untouchables
"Thoughtless"	2002	— (Note: "Thoughtless" did not enter the Billboard Hot 100, but peaked at number 8 on the Bubbling Under Hot 100 chart.)	11	6	—	—	74	39	—	82	37		Untouchables
"Alone I Break"	2002	—	34	19	—	—	—	—	—	—	—		Untouchables
"Did My Time"	2003	38	17	12	29	12	12	24	87	17	15		Take a Look in the Mirror
"Right Now"	2003	— (Note: "Right Now" did not enter the Billboard Hot 100, but peaked at number 19 on the Bubbling Under Hot 100 chart.)	13	11	—	—	— (Note: "Right Now" did not enter the Official German Charts, but peaked at number 6 on the German Alternative Songs Chart.)	—	—	—	—		Take a Look in the Mirror
"Y'All Want a Single"	2004	—	—	23	—	—	—	—	—	—	—	RMNZ: Gold	Take a Look in the Mirror
"Everything I've Known"	2004	—	—	30	—	—	—	—	—	—	—		Take a Look in the Mirror
"Word Up!"	2004	— (Note: "Word Up!" did not enter the Billboard Hot 100, but peaked at number 23 on the Bubbling Under Hot 100 chart.)	17	16	28	58	46	—	—	47	—	BPI: Silver; RMNZ: Gold	Greatest Hits Vol. 1
"Twisted Transistor"	2005	64	9	3	24	37	63	24	27	60	27	BPI: Silver; RMNZ: Gold	See You on the Other Side
"Coming Undone"	2006	79	14	4	54	—	86	49	—	—	63	BPI: Silver; RMNZ: Platinum	See You on the Other Side
"Coming Undone wit It" (with Dem Franchize Boyz)	2006	—	—	—	—	—	—	—	—	—	—		Non-album single
"Politics"	2006	—	—	18	—	—	—	—	—	—	—		See You on the Other Side
"Freak on a Leash (MTV Unplugged)" (featuring Amy Lee)	2007	89	29	22	—	—	—	—	—	—	—		MTV Unplugged: Korn
"Evolution"	2007	— (Note: "Evolution" did not enter the Billboard Hot 100, but peaked at number 7 on the Bubbling Under Hot 100 chart.)	20	4	—	—	—	—	—	—	114		Untitled album
"Hold On"	2007	—	35	9	—	—	—	—	—	—	—		Untitled album
"Kiss"	2008	—	—	— (Note: "Kiss" did not enter the Mainstream Rock Airplay chart, but peaked at number 39 on the Active Rock chart.)	—	—	—	—	—	—	—		Untitled album
"Haze"	2008	—	—	—	—	—	—	—	—	—	—		Non-album single

=== 2010s ===
List of singles released in the 2010s, with selected chart positions and certifications, showing year released and album name
Title	Year	Peak chart positions							Certifications	Album
Title	Year	US Bub.	US Rock	US Rock Airplay	US Main. Rock	US Hard Rock Dig.	CAN	CZE Rock	Certifications	Album
"Oildale (Leave Me Alone)"	2010	—	26	26	10	—	—	4		Korn III: Remember Who You Are
"Let the Guilt Go"	2010	—	20	—	23	—	—	4		Korn III: Remember Who You Are
"Get Up!" (featuring Skrillex)	2011	8	21	21	10	2	—	—	RIAA: Gold	The Path of Totality
"Narcissistic Cannibal" (featuring Skrillex and Kill the Noise)	2011	17	15	15	6	1	97	—	RMNZ: Gold	The Path of Totality
"Way Too Far" (featuring 12th Planet and Flinch)	2012	—	35	—	38	—	—	—		The Path of Totality
"Chaos Lives in Everything" (featuring Skrillex)	2012	—	—	—	—	—	—	—		The Path of Totality
"Never Never"	2013	—	30	13	1	4	— (Note: "Never Never" did not enter the Billboard Canadian Hot 100, but peaked at number 32 on the Canada Rock chart.)	9		The Paradigm Shift
"Spike in My Veins"	2014	—	—	26	5	—	—	—		The Paradigm Shift
"Hater"	2014	—	45	35	5	10	—	—		The Paradigm Shift
"Rotting in Vain"	2016	—	20	19	4	2	—	3		The Serenity of Suffering
"Take Me"	2016	—	42	18	2	10	—	5		The Serenity of Suffering
"Black Is the Soul"	2017	—	—	34	10	—	—	—		The Serenity of Suffering
"You'll Never Find Me"	2019	—	27	19	3	2	—	18		The Nothing

=== 2020s ===
List of singles released in the 2020s, with selected chart positions, showing year released and album name
Title	Year	Peak chart positions					Album
Title	Year	US Rock	US Rock Airplay	US Main. Rock	US Hard Rock Dig.	NZ Hot	Album
"Can You Hear Me"	2020	39	16	4	14	—	The Nothing
"Finally Free"	2020	—	—	—	—	—	The Nothing
"The Devil Went Down to Georgia" (featuring Yelawolf)	2020	—	—	—	12	—	Non-album single
"Start the Healing"	2021	32	8	2	9	—	Requiem
"Worst Is on Its Way"	2022	—	31	10	— (Note: "Worst Is on Its Way" did not enter the US Billboard Hard Rock Digital Songs chart, but peaked at number 24 on the US Hot Hard Rock Songs chart.)	—	Requiem
"Reward the Scars"	2026	— (Note: "Reward the Scars" did not enter the US Billboard Hot Rock & Alternative Songs chart, but peaked at number 10 on the US Alternative Digital Songs chart.)	—	—	2	33	Non-album single
"—" denotes a recording that did not chart or was not released in that territory.

=== Promotional singles ===
List of promotional singles, with selected chart positions, showing year released and album name
Title	Year	Peak chart positions						Album
Title	Year	US Alt.	US Main. Rock	US Rock	US Hard Rock Dig.	CZE Rock	GER Alt.	Album
"Christmas Song"	1994	—	—	—	—	—	—	Non-album single
"Children of the Korn" (featuring Ice Cube)	1998	—	—	—	—	—	—	Follow the Leader
"B.B.K."	1998	—	—	—	—	—	—	Follow the Leader
"I Can Remember"	1998	—	—	—	—	—	—	Non-album single
"Fuck Dying" (Ice Cube featuring Korn)	1999	—	—	—	—	—	—	War & Peace Vol. 1 (The War Disc)
"Jingle Balls"	1999	—	—	—	—	—	—	All Mixed Up
"Somebody Someone"	2000	23	23	—	—	—	—	Issues
"Another Brick in the Wall"	2004	37	12	—	—	—	—	Greatest Hits Vol. 1
"Hypocrites"	2006	—	—	—	—	—	—	See You on the Other Side
"Creep"	2007	—	—	—	—	—	—	MTV Unplugged: Korn
"Love & Meth"	2013	—	—	—	—	—	—	The Paradigm Shift
"Insane"	2016	— (Note: "Insane" did not enter the Alternative Airplay chart, but peaked at number 24 on the Alternative Digital Song Sales chart.)	—	37	5	—	—	The Serenity of Suffering
"A Different World" (featuring Corey Taylor)	2016	— (Note: "A Different World" did not enter the Alternative Airplay chart, but peaked at number 16 on the Alternative Digital Song Sales chart.)	—	41	4	—	1	The Serenity of Suffering
"Cold"	2019	—	—	39	16	—	—	The Nothing
"Forgotten"	2022	—	—	— (Note: "Forgotten" did not enter the Hot Rock & Alternative Songs chart, but peaked at number 15 on the Hot Hard Rock Songs chart.)	—	—	2	Requiem
"Lost in the Grandeur"	2022	—	—	— (Note: "Lost in the Grandeur" did not enter the Hot Rock & Alternative Songs chart, but peaked at number 14 on the Hot Hard Rock Songs chart.)	—	14	—	Requiem
"—" denotes a recording that did not chart or was not released in that territory.

== Other charted songs ==
List of other charted songs, with selected chart positions, showing year released and album name
Title	Year	Peak chart positions	Album
Title	Year	US Hot Hard Rock	Album
"Let the Dark Do the Rest"	2022	21	Requiem

== Guest appearances ==
List of non-single guest appearances, showing year released and album name
Title	Year	Album
"Sean Olson"	1996	The Crow: City of Angels soundtrack
"Kick the P.A." (with Dust Brothers)	1997	Spawn: The Album
"Proud"	1997	I Know What You Did Last Summer soundtrack
"Fuck Dying" (Ice Cube featuring Korn)	1998	War & Peace Volume 1 (The War Disc)
"Camel Song"	1999	End of Days soundtrack
"End of Time" (Q-Tip featuring Korn)	1999	Amplified
"White Trash (Korn Remix)"(Lordz of Brooklyn featuring Korn)	2003	Graffiti Roc
"Fight the Power" (Korn featuring Xzibit)	2005	XXX: State of the Union soundtrack
"Wake Up" (The Notorious B.I.G. featuring Korn)	2005	Duets: The Final Chapter
"Kidnap the Sandy Claws"	2008	Nightmare Revisited
"We Care a Lot"	2016	Metal Hammer: Decades of Destruction

== Videos ==
=== Video albums ===
List of video albums, with selected chart positions and certifications
Title	Details	Peak chart positions				Certifications
Title	Details	US Video	AUS DVD	JPN DVD	UK Video	Certifications
Who Then Now?	Released: March 18, 1997 (US); Label: Immortal, Epic; Formats: VHS, DVD	2	—	—	—	RIAA: Platinum; SNEP: Gold
Deuce	Released: June 11, 2002 (US); Label: Immortal, Epic; Formats: VHS, DVD	1	2	89	—	RIAA: Platinum; SNEP: Gold
Live	Released: November 19, 2002 (US); Label: Immortal, Epic; Formats: 2×DVD	1	—	185	18	RIAA: Gold
Live on the Other Side	Released: June 20, 2006 (US); Label: Virgin; Formats: DVD, Blu-ray	3	—	—	—	
Live at Montreux 2004	Released: May 13, 2008 (US); Label: Eagle Vision; Formats: DVD, Blu-ray	5	—	—	—	
"—" denotes a recording that did not chart or was not released in that territory.

=== Music videos ===
List of music videos, showing year released and director
Title	Year	Director(s)	Album
"Blind"	1995	McG	Korn
"Shoots and Ladders"	1995	McG	Korn
"Clown"	1996	McG	Korn
"No Place to Hide"	1996	—N/a	Life Is Peachy
"A.D.I.D.A.S."	1997	Joseph Kahn	Life Is Peachy
"Faget"	1997	McG	Korn
"Good God" (live)	1997	—N/a	Life Is Peachy
"Got the Life"	1998	McG	Follow the Leader
"Freak on a Leash"	1999	Jonathan Dayton and Valerie Faris, Todd McFarlane	Follow the Leader
"Falling Away from Me"	1999	Fred Durst	Issues
"Make Me Bad"	2000	Martin Weisz	Issues
"Make Me Bad" (Sickness in Salvation Mix)	2000	Martin Weisz	Issues
"Somebody Someone"	2000	Martin Weisz	Issues
"Here to Stay"	2002	The Hughes Brothers	Untouchables
"Thoughtless"	2002	The Hughes Brothers	Untouchables
"Alone I Break"	2002	Sean Dack	Untouchables
"Did My Time"	2003	Dave Meyers	Take a Look in the Mirror
"Right Now" (version 1)	2003	Nathan Cox	Take a Look in the Mirror
"Right Now" (version 2)	2003	Gregory Ecklund	Take a Look in the Mirror
"Right Now" (version 3)	2004	—N/a	Take a Look in the Mirror
"Y'All Want a Single"	2004	Andrews Jenkins	Take a Look in the Mirror
"Everything I've Known"	2004	Gregory Ecklund	Take a Look in the Mirror
"Word Up!"	2004	Antti Jokinen	Greatest Hits Vol. 1
"Another Brick in the Wall" (live)	2004	Bill Yukich	Greatest Hits Vol. 1
"Twisted Transistor"	2005	Dave Meyers	See You on the Other Side
"Coming Undone"	2006	Little X	See You on the Other Side
"Coming Undone wit It" (with Dem Franchize Boyz)	2006	Little X	See You on the Other Side
"Liar"	2006	Tony Shiff	See You on the Other Side
"Politics"	2006	—N/a	See You on the Other Side
"Freak on a Leash" (featuring Amy Lee)	2007	Alex Coletti	MTV Unplugged: Korn
"Evolution"	2007	Dave Meyers	Untitled album
"Hold On"	2007	Vikram Gandhi	Untitled album
"Haze"	2008	bootsrfun	—N/a
"Oildale (Leave Me Alone)"	2010	Phil Mucci	Korn III: Remember Who You Are
"Let the Guilt Go"	2010	Nathan Cox	Korn III: Remember Who You Are
"Get Up!" (featuring Skrillex)	2011	—N/a	The Path of Totality
"Narcissistic Cannibal" (featuring Skrillex and Kill the Noise)	2011	Alex Bulkley	The Path of Totality
"Chaos Lives in Everything" (featuring Skrillex)	2012	—N/a	The Path of Totality
"Way Too Far" (featuring 12th Planet and Flinch)	2012	—N/a	The Path of Totality
"Never Never"	2013	Giovanni Bucci	The Paradigm Shift
"Love & Meth"	2013	Giovanni Bucci	The Paradigm Shift
"Spike in My Veins"	2014	David Dinetz	The Paradigm Shift
"Hater"	2014	David Yarovesky	The Paradigm Shift
"Rotting in Vain"	2016	Dean Karr	The Serenity of Suffering
"Insane"	2016	Ryan Valdez	The Serenity of Suffering
"A Different World" (featuring Corey Taylor)	2016	Luis Téllez	The Serenity of Suffering
"Take Me"	2016	Andrew Baird	The Serenity of Suffering
"Black Is the Soul"	2017	Ryan Valdez	The Serenity of Suffering
"You'll Never Find Me"	2019	Andzej Gavriss	The Nothing
"Can You Hear Me"	2020	Adam Mason	The Nothing
"Finally Free"	2020	Vladimir Nefedov	The Nothing
"Start the Healing"	2021	Tim Saccenti	Requiem
"Worst Is On Its Way"	2022	Craig Bernard, Culley Bunker	Requiem
"Reward The Scars"	2026	Carlos López Estrada	
