= Family Values Tour 2006 =

2006 concert tour by Korn

The 2006 Family Values Tour was a summer concert tour headlined by Korn. The tour originally started in 1998.

== Overview ==
Although originally conceived as an annual tour, the Family Values Tour returned in 2006 after a five-year hiatus.

The 2006 tour featured a total of ten bands across two separate stages, with Californian rockers Droid appearing on a number of shows. Korn, the creators of the tour, headlined the 2006 show with the Deftones as co-headliners.

On July 30, at the tour's stop in Atlanta, a fan was severely beaten over a baseball cap by another concert-goer during the Deftones' set. The victim, 30-year-old local man Andy Richardson, later died as a result of his injuries in the Grady Memorial Hospital.

The defendant, 25-year-old Michael Scott Axley, pleaded guilty to involuntary manslaughter and aggravated assault and was sentenced to 10 years incarceration and 10 years probation. "All the bands on the Family Values Tour offer their sincerest condolences and prayers to the family of 30-year-old Andy Richardson", read an official statement from Korn.

KoRn shot the video for their third "See You on the Other Side" single, "Politics" in East Troy, Wisconsin, putting handheld cameras in the hands of ten lucky members of its fanclub and local area fans who were given all-access passes to shoot the performance and any behind-the-scenes footage that they chose, along with the traditional camera shoot.

More than 400,000 wildly enthusiastic fans turned out for the Family Values Tour for the 30-show city trek.

Two shows during the tour were canceled. One in Wantagh, New York was forced to cancel due to terrible weather that hit the area, flooding the entire floor of the Jones Beach Theater. The second cancelled show was in Virginia Beach, Virginia for undisclosed reasons.

The tour also featured many surprises for fans with special on-stage appearances from Slipknot bassist Paul Gray & Filter frontman Richard Patrick performing "Hey Man, Nice Shot", as well as a U2 cover of "Pride (In the Name of Love)", with Flyleaf which appeared on the Family Values 2006 CD, Deftones frontman Chino Moreno performing "Wicked" and Slipknot/Stone Sour lead singer Corey Taylor joining KoRn on stage for a rendition of "Freak on a Leash".

KoRn bassist Reginald "Fieldy" Arvizu was also forced to jump in for guitarist James "Munky" Shaffer during the band's closing song, "Blind" in Holmdel, New Jersey after he was reportedly drunk and had to leave the stage.

== Official lineup ==
- Korn (headliner)
- Deftones (co-headliner)
- Stone Sour
- Flyleaf (missed show in The Woodlands due to 94.1 JJO Band Camp show)
- Dir En Grey (missed first three shows)
- 10 Years
- Deadsy (missed show in The Woodlands due to Lollapalooza 2006 show)
- Bury Your Dead
- Bullets and Octane
- Walls of Jericho (started 15th August)
- Droid (select dates)
- Unseen Vision (select dates)
- Sekond Skyn (select dates)

== Setlists ==
=== Korn ===
On the 2006 Family Values Tour, Korn played almost the same songs at every stop of the tour, except for some songs played in different places, such as Politics and Twist. The set list was, usually:

- Right Now
- Twist
- Love Song
- A.D.I.D.A.S.
- Thoughtless
- Falling Away from Me
- Coming Undone
- Got the Life
- Throw Me Away
- Shoots and Ladders
- Wicked
- Politics
- Here to Stay
- Freak on a Leash

Encore

- Hollow Life (Acoustic)
- Twisted Transistor
- Y'All Want a Single?
- Blind

=== Deftones ===
- Passenger
- My Own Summer
- Beware
- Feiticeria
- Knife Prty (for Select dates)
- When Girls Telephone Boys (for Select dates)
- Nosebleed
- Engine No. 9
- Be Quiet and Drive
- RX Queen (for Select dates)
- Hole in the Earth
- Headup
- Change (In the House of Flies)
- 7 Words

=== Stone Sour ===
- 30/30-150
- Orchids
- Reborn
- Inhale
- Come What(ever) May
- Bother
- Through Glass
- Idle Hands
- Hell & Consequences
- Get Inside

=== Flyleaf ===
Besides the songs listed below, the band performed a cover of Pride (In the Name of Love) by the band U2 on a select date with Richard Patrick, as well as a cover of "Something I Can Never Have" by Nine Inch Nails.

- Red Sam
- Breathe Today
- Fully Alive
- I'm Sorry
- I'm So Sick
- So I Thought
- Cassie

=== Dir En Grey ===
The songs that Dir En Grey played differed from each show (with the exception of the song G.D.S. being used to open each show), but these songs were played more frequently during the tour:

- Merciless Cult
- Ryoujoku no Ame,
- Spilled Milk,
- THE FATAL BELIEVER,
- KODOKU NI SHISU YUENI KODOKU,
- The Final,
- dead tree,
- THE IIID EMPIRE,
- Clever Sleazoid.

These songs were played once or twice during the tour:

- Saku,
- C,
- Child Prey,
- Kasumi,
- audience KILLER LOOP,
- ITOSHISA HA FUHAI NITSUKI,
- Jesus Christ R'n R,
- KODOU,
- Mr.NEWSMAN,
- Beautiful Dirt,
- HIGEKI WA MABUTA WO OROSHITA YASASHIKI UTSU.

=== Deadsy ===
- Key to Gramercy Park
- Le Cirque en Rose
- Book of Black Dreams
- Babes in Abyss
- Carrying Over
- Asura
- Flowing Glower
- Time
- Tom Sawyer

== CD and DVD release ==
The 2006 edition of Family Values Tour was highly successful and it was documented on separate CD and DVD releases, both of which were released on December 26, 2006 via Firm Music.

Dir En Grey released a live DVD to their fan club entitled Despair in the Womb. The DVD featured a documentary of the tour on its second disc.

== Dates ==
Date	City	Country	Venue
July 29, 2006	Antioch	United States	Starwood Amphitheater
July 30, 2006	Atlanta	United States	HiFi Buys Amphitheatre
August 2, 2006	Pensacola	United States	Pensacola Civic Center
August 4, 2006	Selma	United States	Verizon Wireless Amphitheater
August 5, 2006	Dallas	United States	Smirnoff Music Centre
August 6, 2006	The Woodlands	United States	Cynthia Woods Mitchell Pavilion
August 15, 2006	Greenwood Village	United States	Fiddler's Green Amphitheatre
August 16, 2006	Albuquerque	United States	Journal Pavilion
August 18, 2006	Phoenix	United States	Cricket Wireless Pavilion
August 19, 2006	San Bernardino	United States	Hyundai Pavilion
August 20, 2006	Wheatland	United States	Sleep Train Amphitheatre
August 24, 2006	Bonner Springs	United States	Verizon Wireless Amphitheater
August 25, 2006	Moline	United States	MARK of the Quad Cities
August 26, 2006	East Troy	United States	Alpine Valley Music Theatre
August 28, 2006	Toronto	Canada	Molson Amphitheatre
August 29, 2006	Corfu	United States	Darien Lake Performing Arts Center
September 1, 2006	Holmdel Township	United States	PNC Bank Arts Center
September 2, 2006	Wantagh	United States	~~Nikon at Jones Beach Theater~~ cancelled
September 3, 2006	Hartford	United States	New England Dodge Music Center
September 5, 2006	Saratoga Springs	United States	Saratoga Performing Arts Center
September 6, 2006	Cleveland	United States	Tower City Amphitheater
September 8, 2006	Burgettstown	United States	Post Gazette Pavilion
September 9, 2006	Clarkston	United States	DTE Energy Music Theatre
September 10, 2006	Noblesville	United States	Verizon Wireless Amphitheater
September 12, 2006	Cincinnati	United States	Riverbend Music Center
September 13, 2006	Columbus	United States	Germain Amphitheater
September 15, 2006	Camden	United States	Tweeter Center at the Waterfront
September 16, 2006	Mansfield	United States	Tweeter Center for the Performing Arts
September 17, 2006	Bristow	United States	Nissan Pavilion
September 19, 2006	Tampa	United States	St. Pete Times Forum
September 20, 2006	West Palm Beach	United States	Sound Advice Amphitheatre
September 22, 2006	Virginia Beach	United States	~~Verizon Wireless Amphitheater~~ Cancelled
