= MTV Unplugged (Korn album) =

Live album by Korn
- Released: March 5, 2007
- Recorded: December 9, 2006 at MTV Studios in Times Square, New York City
- Genre: Acoustic rock
- Length: 44:32
- Labels: EMI, Virgin
- Producers: Richard Gibbs, Alex Coletti

Korn chronology
Chopped, Screwed, Live and Unglued (2006)	MTV Unplugged (2007)	Untitled (2007)

Professional ratings
Review scores
Source	Rating
AllMusic	2/5 stars
CDNow	3.5/5 stars
Entertainment Weekly	B−
Metal Hammer	4/10 stars
MetalSucks	1/5 stars
Newsday	B−
New York Daily News	(Very favorable)
PopMatters	3/10 stars
Revolver	4.5/5 stars

MTV Unplugged: Korn is an acoustic live album by American nu metal band Korn, released worldwide on March 5, 2007, and on the following day in the United States.

== Album information ==
The performance, part of the MTV Unplugged series, took place in MTV studios in Times Square, New York City on December 9, 2006, in front of a crowd of approximately fifty people. It was the band's first and only live album recorded as a three piece band since drummer David Silveria departed the group earlier that month.

The MTV concert was Korn's second televised acoustic performance, after appearing on Jimmy Kimmel Live! on July 18, 2006.

The show was broadcast online on MTV.com on February 23, 2007, and was broadcast on television networks in America, Europe and Asia from March 2, 2007.

The exclusive acoustic set had the participation of other big-name artists including the Cure and Amy Lee. Additionally, Korn were joined by an array of instrumentalists and touring musicians, including guitarist Rob Patterson, backup vocalist Kalen Chase, keyboardist Zac Baird, and percussionist Michael Jochum.

The album debuted on the U.S. Billboard 200 at #9, with about 51,000 copies sold in its first week, and experienced 55% decline in sales in the following week.

== Richard Gibbs comments on the album ==
On December 24, 2006, Richard Gibbs made the following statement on his message board:

"About a month or so ago my pal Jonathan (Davis) asked me to music direct/arrange Korn's appearance on MTV Unplugged. We videotaped at MTV's studios in Times Square two weeks ago and we are currently mixing that CD as well here at the Woodshed, yours truly at the producing helm again. For this project I added four celli, two basses, two cimbassos, two bass/contrabass trombonists, a saw player, a glass harmonica player, choir bells, and a six person taiko ensemble to Korn. Plus The Cure sat in for a mashup and Amy Lee (from Evanescence) sang along on Freak on a Leash. Fairly awesome."

== Track listing ==
No.	Title	Writer(s)	Original album	Length
1.	"Blind"	Jonathan Davis, Brian Welch, James Shaffer, Reginald Arvizu, David Silveria, Ryan Shuck, Dennis Shinn	Korn	3:29
2.	"Hollow Life"	Davis, Welch, Shaffer, Arvizu, Silveria	Untouchables	3:24
3.	"Freak on a Leash" (featuring Amy Lee from Evanescence)	Davis, Welch, Shaffer, Arvizu, Silveria	Follow the Leader	3:55
4.	"Falling Away from Me"	Davis, Welch, Shaffer, Arvizu, Silveria	Issues	3:55
5.	"Creep" (Radiohead cover)	Colin Greenwood, Jonny Greenwood, Ed O'Brien, Phil Selway, Thom Yorke	Pablo Honey	3:51
6.	"Love Song"	Davis, Shaffer, Arvizu, Silveria, The Matrix, Atticus Ross	See You on the Other Side	3:50
7.	"Got the Life"	Davis, Welch, Shaffer, Arvizu, Silveria	Follow the Leader	3:48
8.	"Twisted Transistor"	Davis, Shaffer, Arvizu, Silveria, The Matrix	See You on the Other Side	3:00
9.	"Coming Undone"	Davis, Shaffer, Arvizu, Silveria, The Matrix	See You on the Other Side	3:35
10.	"Make Me Bad" / "In Between Days" (featuring The Cure)	Davis, Welch, Shaffer, Arvizu, Silveria / Smith	"Make Me Bad" is from Issues "In Between Days" is from The Head on the Door	5:35
11.	"Throw Me Away"	Davis, Shaffer, Arvizu, Silveria, The Matrix, Ross	See You on the Other Side	6:20
Total length:				44:32

=== B-sides ===
- "No One's There"
- "Thoughtless"
- "Dirty" (MTV Virtual Hills leak) (also bonus track on the Japanese edition of the album)

=== Additional content ===
The album's booklet contained a special code which granted owners of the recording an opportunity for an exclusive preview of Korn's then forthcoming studio album.

== Personnel ==
Credits adapted from the album's liner notes.

Korn

- Jonathan Davis – lead vocals
- Fieldy – bass
- Munky – guitar

Additional musicians

- Rob Patterson – additional guitars
- Kalen Musmecci – backing vocals, percussion
- Michael Jochum – percussion
- Zac Baird – keys
- Jeremy Turner, Evie Koh, Julie Green, Erik Friedlander – cello
- Bill Ellison, Jeff Carney – upright bass
- Mike Davis, Jeff Nelson – trombone
- Dale Struckenbruck – musical saw
- Bill Hayes – glass harmonica
- Morris Kainuma, Andy Bove – cimbasso
- Hana Yoshikawa, Heather McPherson, Wynn Yamami, Midori Yasuda, Alan Okada, Merle Okada – taiko drums

Production

- Produced by Richard Gibbs and Korn
- Produced and Directed for MTV by Alex Coletti
- Musical direction and arrangements by Richard Gibbs
- Recorded by John Harris
  - Assisted by Peter Gary, Max Feldman, AJ Maynard
- Additional Engineers – Vini Cirilli and Csaba Petcocz
- Second Engineer – Jorge Costa
  - Assisted by Nick O'Toole
- Mixed by Terry Date
- Mastered by Stephen Marcussen
- Audio Post Production – Christopher Koch

== Chart positions ==
Album

Chart (2007)	Peak position
Australian Albums Chart	45
Austrian Albums Chart	10
Belgian Albums Chart (Flanders)	95
Belgian Albums Chart (Wallonia)	70
Dutch Albums Chart	54
French Albums Chart	60
German Albums Chart	23
Mexican Albums Chart	58
New Zealand Albums Chart	11
Swiss Albums Chart	48
UK Album Chart	131
The Billboard 200	9
Digital Albums	9
Rock Albums	5
Tastemakers Albums	7

Singles

Song	Chart (2007)	Peak position
Freak on a Leash (ft. Amy Lee of Evanescence)	US	89
Freak on a Leash (ft. Amy Lee of Evanescence)	Alternative Songs	29
Freak on a Leash (ft. Amy Lee of Evanescence)	Hot Mainstream Rock Tracks	22
Freak on a Leash (ft. Amy Lee of Evanescence)	Pop 100	73
