= Family Values Tour 2006 (album) =

2006 live album by various artists

Live album by Various Artists
- Released: December 26, 2006
- Recorded: August 19, 2006 (Hyundai Pavilon) in San Bernardino, CA); September 1, 2006 (PNC Bank Arts Center in Holmdel, NJ); September 16, 2006 (Tweeter Center in Boston, MA)
- Genres: Nu metal; alternative metal; alternative rock; J-rock
- Length: 70:39 (excluding bonus content)
- Label: Firm Music
- Producer: Peter Katsis (exec.)

Various Artists chronology
The Family Values Tour 2001 (2002)	Family Values Tour 2006 (2006)

Professional ratings
Review scores
Source	Rating
Allmusic	2.5/5 stars
PopMatters	3/10 stars

The Family Values Tour 2006 is a live album released on December 26, 2006, by Firm Music, to commemorate the fourth iteration of the Family Values Tour, launched in 1998 by American nu metal band Korn. It is executive-produced by Peter Katsis and is the fourth and final Family Values record.

== History ==
The CD features live tracks from headliners Korn and Deftones, as well as selected cuts from some of other bands on the bill: Stone Sour, Flyleaf, Dir En Grey, 10 Years, and Deadsy. Bullets and Octane, Bury Your Dead, and Walls of Jericho are not featured on the compilation.

== Track listing ==
CD

No.	Title	Performer(s)	Length
1.	"Right Now"	Korn	4:05
2.	"Coming Undone"	Korn	3:29
3.	"I'm So Sick"	Flyleaf	3:30
4.	"Wasteland"	10 Years	5:08
5.	"Through Glass"	Stone Sour	4:56
6.	"My Own Summer (Shove It)"	Deftones	4:03
7.	"Merciless Cult"	Dir En Grey	3:01
8.	"Reborn"	Stone Sour	3:13
9.	"Waking Up"	10 Years	4:20
10.	"Pride (In the Name of Love)" (featuring Richard Patrick)	Flyleaf	4:55
11.	"Ryōjoku no Ame"	Dir En Grey	4:14
12.	"Shoots and Ladders/Wicked" (featuring Chino Moreno)	Korn	7:41
13.	"Nosebleed"	Deftones	4:49
14.	"Freak on a Leash" (featuring Corey Taylor)	Korn	4:27
15.	"Blind"	Korn	4:24
16.	"Carrying Over"	Deadsy	4:24
Total length:			67:99

Bonus content

No.	Title	Performer(s)	Length
1.	"Throw Me Away" (Best Buy exclusive download)	Korn	4:59
2.	"Politics" (Best Buy exclusive download)	Korn	3:14
3.	"Falling Away from Me" (Edited) (Wal-Mart bonus download)	Korn
4.	"Love Song" (iTunes version)	Korn	3:51
5.	"Got the Life" (Rhapsody version)	Korn	4:11
6.	"Twisted Transistor" (Japanese version)	Korn	3:07

== Billboard charts ==
=== Album ===
Year	Chart	Position
2006	The Billboard 200	102
