= Chopped, Screwed, Live and Unglued =

Remix album by Korn
- Released: September 26, 2006
- Recorded: 2006
- Length: Disc 1: 37:33; Disc 2: 44:15
- Label: Virgin/EMI
- Producer: Various Producers

Korn chronology
Live & Rare (2006)	Chopped, Screwed, Live and Unglued (2006)	MTV Unplugged (2007)

Chopped, Screwed, Live and Unglued is a Korn fanpack of See You on the Other Side, including two CDs and one DVD in set, issued by Virgin Records on September 26, 2006.

== Overview ==
The compilation features remixes of selected songs from See You on the Other Side made using chopped and screwed technique by DJ Michael "5000" Watts, exclusive mash-up remix entitled "Coming Undone wit It" with Atlanta rap group Dem Franchize Boyz along with two fan remixes of the hit single "Coming Undone" from the winners of the Acid Planet remix contest, as well as live performances recorded in various locations, two acoustic renditions of singles – "Twisted Transistor" and "Coming Undone", previously unreleased, animated video for the song "Liar", music videos for "Twisted Transistor", and "Coming Undone" and interviews with the band. Korn is the first alternative metal band to have an album chopped and screwed, as this method of remixing is often reserved for southern rap style groups or music stylings.

== Contents ==
- Disc 1 – Chopped & Screwed (CD)
1. "Twisted Transistor" – 5:03
2. "Hypocrites" – 3:44
3. "Getting Over: DJ Michael "5000" Watts" – 3:17
4. "Getting Off" – 4:04
5. "For No One" – 4:52
6. "Love Song" – 4:44
7. "10 or a 2-Way" – 4:07
8. "Coming Undone" – 4:05
9. "Coming Undone wit It / Korn vs. Dem Franchize Boyz" – 3:29
- Disc 2 – Live & Unglued (CD)
1. "Hypocrites" (live, recorded in Cologne, Germany on August 26, 2005) – 3:55
2. "Somebody Someone" (live, recorded in Lewiston, Maine on March 26, 2006) – 4:44
3. "Throw Me Away" (live, recorded in Lewiston, Maine on March 26, 2006) – 5:09
4. "Liar / Guitar-Piano Duet" (live, recorded in East Rutherford, New Jersey on March 28, 2006) – 7:57
5. "Love Song" (live, recorded in Phoenix, Arizona on March 12, 2006) – 4:36
6. "Blind" (live, recorded in East Rutherford, New Jersey on March 28, 2006) – 4:23
7. "Coming Undone" (Sleazy Days Rock Electro Remix / Acid Planet Remix-France) – 3:18
8. "Coming Undone" (Stegnation Remix / Acid Planet Remix-Holland) – 3:26
9. "Coming Undone" (live, recorded in Center Staging, Burbank, California on April 13 for acoustic AOL Sessions) – 3:34
10. "Twisted Transistor" (live, recorded in Center Staging, Burbank, California on April 13 for acoustic AOL Sessions) – 3:01
- Disc 3 (DVD) (music videos)
1. "Twisted Transistor" (music video)
2. "Coming Undone" (music video)
3. "Twisted Transistor" (AOL LIVE music video)
4. "Coming Undone" (AOL LIVE music video)
5. "Liar" (Computer Flash music video)
6. "Coming Undone wit It" (video)
7. Behind-the-Scenes Footage

== Chart positions ==
Chart	Peak position
New Zealand Albums Chart	27

== See also ==
- Korn video albums
