= Melicious =

Melicious (aka Melissa Lefton)

Studio album by Melissa Lefton
- Released: Never commercially released
- Recorded: 2001
- Genre: Pop; electronica; comedy
- Length: 36:50
- Label: Jive Records; Zomba Recording
- Producer: The Matrix

Melicious is the debut studio album by American singer-songwriter Melissa Lefton. It was intended for release on August 21, 2001, by Jive Records, however, it was delayed indefinitely. The album was produced by The Matrix and explores a variety of eccentric topics through a satirical lens. Melicious received generally favorable reviews from critics, with many praising the radio-friendly nature of the album and the unorthodox themes explored throughout it. Prior to the album's shelving, a mockumentary titled Behind the Muse was produced in order to promote Melicious. Two songs from the album were commercially released; "My Hit Song" and "I Love Life" were included on the soundtracks to the films On the Line and The Princess Diaries, respectively.

== Background ==
The album was originally stated to be due for release on August 21, 2001 on Jive Records. It was later said to be due for release in Spring 2002, but was eventually suspended indefinitely. The album was produced by The Matrix.

The only copies of the album that exist are full length promotional copies, none of which include the publicized album cover. There are two variations: one is an acetate promo which has a stick-on label and comes in an orange jewel case. The other comes in a cardboard sleeve and features Lefton in a T-shirt with a jolly roger on it. A three song sampler also exists which plays the songs "My Hit Song," "Ozone" and "Sugar Daddy".

Melicious took on topics like pollution, sugar daddies, occultism and murder, with tongue in cheek lyrics.

Two songs on this album were commercially released on other albums. "I Love Life" appeared on the soundtrack to The Princess Diaries. Commenting on the soundtrack Heather Phares from AllMusic spoke favourably of the track. "My Hit Song" appeared on the soundtrack to On the Line and also appeared on the compilation album Cool Traxx! 3. Heather Phares said the track was "sending up and relishing teen pop's plastic sound and mindless appeal". The track "Radio Rainbow" appears in the film Halloweentown II: Kalabar's Revenge, though the film did not release an accompanying soundtrack.

== Promotion ==
A promotional short film was created to promote the album. Called Behind the Muse, it was a mockumentary spoofing the Behind the Music program and format. In it, Lefton is depicted as an already-famous musician who rose to fame as a pop star only to succumb to an IV addiction to SunnyD. After a nearly fatal car crash she records a critically panned album titled "Ouch!", and then revitalizes her career as a Las Vegas lounge singer. The humor in the film is decidedly not for young people; for example, regarding her addiction, Lefton states: "I was making love to sweaty bums just to score a hit of SunnyD, and it didn't feel good on my vagina." The film was promotionally distributed on VHS and MiniDV tapes.

== Critical reception ==
The month before it was due for release, the Seattle Weekly gave a favourable review of the album, as did the Autumn 2001 edition of Elle Girl. MacKenzie Wilson from AllMusic also spoke highly of the album, saying it "matches the pop sassiness of the Go-Go's and Cyndi Lauper". Jimmy Draper from AllMusic gave the album four stars out of five, concluding "This isn't your typical Top 40 fodder because, thankfully, there isn't anything typical about Lefton's surprisingly enjoyable and energetic debut." Five years after it was cancelled, Stylus Magazine gave the album a positive review and referred to Lefton as the "queen of shelved teenpop".

== Track listing ==
Melicious – Standard edition
No.	Title	Writer(s)	Length
1.	"My Hit Song"	Melissa Lefton; Lauren Christy; Scott Spock; Graham Edwards	3:05
2.	"...Now I Got Punk Rock Fever"	Lefton; Christy; Spock; Edwards	2:55
3.	"Radio Rainbow"	Lefton; Christy; Spock; Edwards	3:35
4.	"Ozone"	Lefton; Christy; Spock; Edwards	3:03
5.	"Last Summer"	Lefton; Christy; Spock; Edwards	3:33
6.	"Sugar Daddy"	Lefton; Roger Greenawalt	3:19
7.	"Bionic Man"	Lefton; Andy Goldmark	3:22
8.	"Sunnyville"	Lefton; Scott Hollingsworth	3:23
9.	"I Love Life"	Lefton; Goldmark	3:13
10.	"Who Shot Jennifer?"	Lefton; Hollingsworth	3:48
11.	"I Know You Want Me (How Can I Blame You?)"	Lefton; Christy; Spock; Edwards	3:21
Total length:			36:37
