= You'll Never Find Me =

You'll Never Find Me may refer to:

- You'll Never Find Me (film), a 2023 Australian horror film
- "You'll Never Find Me", a song by Ocean Colour Scene from On the Leyline, 2007
- "You'll Never Find Me" (song), a 2019 song by Korn
