= Broken Record (EP) =

EP by Jayme Dee
- Released: July 30, 2013
- Recorded: 2011–13
- Genre: Pop; pop rock
- Length: 19:38
- Label: Republic
- Producer: Ernest Clark; Aaron Michael Cox; Jayme Dee; Fraser T Smith; David Hodges; The Matrix; Steve Miller; Marcos Palacios; Adam Stidham

Singles from Broken Record
- 1. "Tip Toes" Released: August 21, 2012

Broken Record is the debut extended play (EP) by American singer-songwriter Jayme Dee. It was released in the United States on July 30, 2013, by Republic Records. Throughout the recording process, Dee worked with a variety of producers such as Aaron Michael Cox, Fraser T Smith, and The Matrix.

The EP was preceded by the single "Tip Toes", which was released on August 21, 2012.

== Singles ==
Broken Record was preceded by the single "Tip Toes", which was released on August 21, 2012, after Dee released a snippet of the song a month prior.

== Track listing ==
No.	Title	Writer(s)	Producer(s)	Length
1.	"Tip Toes"	Ernest Clark, Aaron Michael Cox, Jayme Dee Mackinga, Marcos Palacios, Adam Sitdham	Clark, Cox, Mackinga, Palacios, Stidham	2:49
2.	"Broken Record"	Clark, Cox, Mackinga, Palacios, Stidham	Clark, Cox, Mackinga, Palacios, Stidham	3:54
3.	"Love Whiplash"	Mackinga, Stidham	Mackinga, Stidham	2:45
4.	"Heartbreaker"	Lauren Christy, Graham Edwards, Mackinga, Scott Spock	The Matrix	3:01
5.	"Red Lights"	Mackinga, Fraser Lance Thorneycroft-Smith	Fraser T Smith	3:27
6.	"Till I Fall Asleep"	David Hodges, Mackinga, Steve Miller	Hodges, Mackinga, Miller	3:42
Total length:				19:38

== Personnel ==
Credits and personnel for Broken Record adapted from AllMusic.

- Ernest Clark – production (tracks 1, 2)
- Aaron Michael Cox – production (tracks 1, 2)
- Jayme Dee – vocals, production (tracks 1, 2, 3, 6)
- Fraser T. Smith – production (track 5)
- David Hodges – production (track 6)
- The Matrix – production (track 4)
- Steve Miller – production (track 6)
- Marcos Palacios – production (tracks 1, 2)
- Adam Stidham – production (tracks 1, 2, 3)

== Release history ==
Region	Date	Format(s)	Label	Ref.
Canada	July 30, 2013	Digital download	Republic	
United States	July 30, 2013	Digital download	Republic	
