= Live & Rare (Korn album) =

Compilation album by Korn
- Released: May 9, 2006
- Recorded: 1996–2004
- Genres: Nu metal; alternative metal
- Length: 59:42
- Labels: Epic; Immortal; Sony BMG
- Producer: Various

Korn chronology
See You on the Other Side (2005)	Live & Rare (2006)	Chopped, Screwed, Live and Unglued (2006)

Professional ratings
Review scores
Source	Rating
AllMusic	3/5 stars

Live & Rare is a compilation album by American nu metal band Korn, released on May 9, 2006. It features 13 tracks: all seven from the DVD featuring 2003's CBGB show in New York, which are found on special editions of Greatest Hits Vol. 1, two from Woodstock 1999, three cover songs (one a hidden track from Follow the Leader and another a hidden track from Take a Look in the Mirror), and "Proud", taken from the I Know What You Did Last Summer soundtrack.

== Track listing ==
No.	Title	Original album	Length
1.	"Did My Time" (Live at CBGB)	Greatest Hits, Vol. 1	4:12
2.	"Blind" (Live at CBGB)	Greatest Hits, Vol. 1	4:12
3.	"Falling Away from Me" (Live at CBGB)	Greatest Hits, Vol. 1	4:15
4.	"Right Now" (Live at CBGB)	Greatest Hits, Vol. 1	3:05
5.	"Got the Life" (Live at CBGB)	Greatest Hits, Vol. 1	4:06
6.	"Here to Stay" (Live at CBGB)	Greatest Hits, Vol. 1	4:20
7.	"Freak on a Leash" (Live at CBGB)	Greatest Hits, Vol. 1	4:25
8.	"Another Brick in the Wall, (Parts 1, 2, 3)" (Pink Floyd cover) (Live at Projekt Revolution)	Previously unreleased	8:21
9.	"One" (Metallica cover) (Live from "MTV Icon: Metallica")	Take a Look in the Mirror	4:27
10.	"My Gift to You" (Live at Woodstock '99)	Previously unreleased	6:13
11.	"A.D.I.D.A.S." (Live at Woodstock '99)	Previously unreleased	3:50
12.	"Earache My Eye" (Cheech and Chong cover)	Follow the Leader	4:50
13.	"Proud"	I Know What You Did Last Summer soundtrack	3:26
Total length:			59:42

Japanese edition bonus tracks
No.	Title	Original album	Length
14.	"Sean Olson"	The Crow: City of Angels soundtrack	4:48
15.	"I Can Remember"	Got the Life single	3:37
Total length:			68:07

== Additional notes ==
Tracks 1–7:

- Recorded live at CBGB, New York City, 11/24/2003
- Mixed by Frank Filipetti
- Additional mixing by Warren Huart

Track 8:

- Live at Projekt Revolution
- Recorded live at UMB Bank Pavilion, Maryland Heights, MO, 08/25/2004
- Engineered by John Van Eaten
- Live sound: Bill Sheppell
- Mixed by Tim Harkins at NRG Studios, North Hollywood, CD

Track 9:

- Hidden track originally from the Immortal/Epic release of Take a Look in the Mirror
- Recorded live on 05/03/2003 at Universal Studios, Universal City, CA
- Taken from "MTV ICON: Metallica"
- Used with permission by MTV: Music Television

Tracks 10 and 11:

- Produced by Mitch Maketansky
- Recorded live at Woodstock '99 by Dave Thoener, Rome, NY, July 23, 1999
- Mixed by John X at The Record Plant, NYC

Track 12:

- Hidden track originally appearing on the Immortal/Epic release of Follow the Leader
- Produced by Steve Thompson, Toby Wright & Korn
- Recorded by Toby Wright at NRG Recording, North Hollywood, CA
- Additional Recording: John Ewing Jr.
- Assisted by: John Ewing Jr.
- Mixed by Brendan O'Brien at Southern Tracks Studio, Atlanta, GA

Track 13:

- Taken from the Columbia release of I Know What You Did Last Summer
- Produced by Ross Robinson
- Mastered by Stephen Marcussen
- Digitally edited by Stewart Whitmore for Marcussen Mastering, Hollywood, CA

== Charts ==
Chart (2006)	Peak position
Austrian Albums Chart	38
Belgian Albums Chart (Flanders)	90
Belgian Albums Chart (Wallonia)	94
French Albums Chart	100
German Albums Chart	72
New Zealand Heatseekers Albums (RIANZ)	4
Swiss Albums Chart	64
UK Albums Chart	193
UK Rock & Metal Albums (Official Charts)	9
