= Can You Hear Me (Korn song) =

2019 song by Korn

- Acoustic single cover

Single by Korn

from the album The Nothing
- Released: September 6, 2019
- Recorded: 2019 (album version)
- Length: 2:53
- Label: Roadrunner
- Songwriter: Jonathan Davis
- Producer: Nick Raskulinecz

Korn singles chronology
"Cold" (2019)	"Can You Hear Me" (2019)	"Finally Free" (2020)

Music video
- "Can You Hear Me" on YouTube

"Can You Hear Me" (Note: A trailing question mark is absent in almost all cases, with only the video thumbnail for the acoustic version containing it) is a song by American nu metal band Korn, released as the penultimate single from their thirteenth studio album The Nothing.

== Background ==
"Can You Hear Me" was originally revealed on 14 May 2015 on the YouTube channel of music equipment company Antelope Audio. The song was initially intended as a solo work by Davis, but was eventually included in The Nothing after Nick Raskulinecz heard it:

"The band went back and did it, and I really liked how that came out. That’s one of the songs with 20-something vocals on it, there’s so many harmonies it’s like Abba or some shit. I love it."

"Can You Hear Me" was eventually revealed to be the eighth track on the album upon the release of lead single "You'll Never Find Me" in June 2019, over four years after its debut. It was ultimately released as the third single from the album a week prior to its release on 6 September 2019, with an accompanying visualizer promoting a podcast bearing the album's title.

A proper music video for the song was released on 20 March 2020. This music video focuses on a central figure, dressed in a hoodie and producing what appears to be slime, interacting with a series of television screens and a smartphone. Scenes from the video feature a reflection of the person's face, a mixture of both positive and negative social media interactions, emoji, and phone users seemingly transforming into zombies. The video has been interpreted as a criticism of social media culture and addiction as well as highlighting the mental health effects of isolation due to the COVID-19 pandemic.

An acoustic version of the song was released later in 2020.

== Composition ==
Backed by a guitar riff described as "searing", the song is considerably more electronic in texture than other songs on The Nothing.

The chorus is often highlighted for its highly emotional lyrical content.

== Reception ==
A Kerrang! review of the album praises "Can You Hear Me" as "a bewitching, haunted anthem of loss".

Vince Neilstein of MetalSucks approved of the song, despite his general dislike of Korn, comparing it to their 2000 hit "Make Me Bad"; his only criticism being the lack of a question mark in the song title.

== Personnel ==
- Jonathan Davis – lead vocals
- James "Munky" Shaffer – guitars
- Brian "Head" Welch – guitars
- Reginald "Fieldy" Arvizu – bass
- Ray Luzier – drums

== Charts ==
=== Weekly charts ===
Chart performance for "Can You Hear Me"
Chart (2020)	Peak position
US Hot Rock & Alternative Songs (Billboard)	32
US Rock & Alternative Airplay (Billboard)	8
