= Breed (Lauren Christy album) =

Studio album by Lauren Christy
- Released: July 22, 1997
- Genre: Alternative rock
- Length: 39:10
- Label: Mercury
- Producer: Gary Clark; Andy Scott; Tony Peluso; Lauren Christy; Doll Factory

Lauren Christy chronology
Lauren Christy (1993)	Breed (1997)

Singles from Breed
- 1. "Breed" Released: August 12, 1997; 2. "Magazine" Released: November 11, 1997

Breed is the second studio album by British singer Lauren Christy. It was released on July 22, 1997, by Mercury Records. After the album's release, Christy quit her solo music career to join the writing/production trio The Matrix.

== Critical reception ==
Professional ratings
Review scores
Source	Rating
AllMusic	3/5 stars

AllMusic states that Breed is a "great second record from an extraordinary talent, and one of 1997's best pop albums." The website describes the album's sound as "slightly sinister pop, with finely woven layers of fuzz guitar [and] pulsing drums." It also notes that "Christy likes to build songs up bit by bit, but always cuts quickly to the chase--as in the flowing "Burn": first a simple, strummed acoustic guitar, and then before you know it the chorus blasts in from out of nowhere, background vocals soaring above her hypnotic vocals and a perfectly applied mechanical beat."

== Appearances in other media ==
The title track was featured on the soundtrack for the 1997 film Batman & Robin, released by Warner Bros. Records. The song "I Want What I Want" also appeared in the 1998 film Wild Things.

== Track listing ==
No.	Title	Writer(s)	Length
1.	"Breed"	Lauren Christy; Gary Clark	3:05
2.	"I Want What I Want"	Christy; Charlie Midnight	4:02
3.	"Magazine"	Christy; Midnight; Andy Scott	3:28
4.	"You Make Me Laugh"	Christy; Clark	3:32
5.	"25 Back Then"	Christy; Clark	3:28
6.	"Boomerang Bang"	Christy; Midnight; Scott	4:05
7.	"Burn"	Christy; Clark	3:10
8.	"Letterbomb"	Christy; Clark	4:06
9.	"Could've Been"	Christy; Midnight; Scott	3:46
10.	"The Night I Saved Peter Ustinov"	Christy; Midnight; Scott	3:58
11.	"Breed (Coda)"	Christy; Clark	2:30
Total length:			39:10

== Release history ==
Release formats for Breed
Region	Date	Edition(s)	Format(s)	Label	Ref.
United States	July 22, 1997	Standard	CD	Mercury	
