= The Matrix (production team) =

American-British songwriting team

- Origin: Los Angeles, California, U.S.
- Genres: Pop; rock
- Instruments: Guitars; bass; keyboards; piano
- Years active: 1999−present
- Labels: Columbia; Let's Hear It
- Members: Lauren Christy; Scott Spock; Graham Edwards
- Past members: Adam Longlands; Katy Perry
- Website: www.thematrixmusic.com

The Matrix is an American-British songwriting and record production team, consisting of Lauren Christy, Scott Spock, and Graham Edwards. In 1999, the production team took on their first project, the Jackson Mendoza song "Venus or Mars"; it was intended to be a one-off project. Christy, Spock, and Edwards enjoyed the songwriting and production process, which prompted them to form a production team. The team chose their name, the Matrix, as they wanted to remain in the background and allow the artists they work with to further stand out.

The Matrix's breakthrough came in 2002 with the release of Avril Lavigne's debut studio album Let Go, in which they co-wrote and produced five songs. Three of the songs became top ten singles on the Billboard Hot 100 chart ("Complicated", "Sk8er Boi", and "I'm with You") and their work with Lavigne collectively earned them seven Grammy Award nominations in 2003 and 2004. The success of these songs caused the Matrix to become a sought after production team, with the Matrix subsequently producing songs for artists such as Liz Phair, Britney Spears, Shakira, and Korn.

In 2002, the Matrix began work on their own studio album under Columbia Records. The production team recruited Adam Longlands (then known as A.K.A.) and Katy Perry to record lead vocals on the effort. A full album was recorded, several music videos were produced, and a tentative release date was set for the summer of 2004. However, the project was abruptly cancelled only weeks before its intended release. Following the release and subsequent success of Perry's second studio album One of the Boys (2008), the Matrix independently released their album under the title The Matrix on January 27, 2009.

== Formation ==
In 1991, Lauren Christy and her then-husband Graham Edwards relocated to Los Angeles, California, in an effort to support her budding music career. Christy released two studio albums, including Lauren Christy (1993) and Breed (1997). In 1998, Edwards formed the electronic pop duo Dollshead with singer Sierra Swan. Scott Spock remixed one of the duo's songs, which ultimately resulted in Edwards asking Spock to join Dollshead. Spock accepted this offer and the group began writing songs together. In 1999, Dollshead's manager asked the group if they could write a song for Australian pop duo Jackson Mendoza. Christy and Edwards were apprehensive to accept this project, as they vowed to not professionally work together when they originally wed. The group, however, eventually accepted the project and wrote "Venus or Mars" for the duo. While this project was meant to be a one-time occurrence, the group decided to continue writing and producing together due to the song being well-received and their overall enjoyment of the process.

In reference to the production group's name, Spock explained: "We don't want to take the glory, which is why we took the name the Matrix, to be in the background, to make the artist's name stand out more".

== Career ==
=== Writing and producing ===
The Matrix first came to prominence in the early 2000s for their collaborations with pop music artists such as Christina Aguilera, Busted, Myra, Hilary Duff, Avril Lavigne, Jason Mraz, Liz Phair, Ashley Tisdale, Shakira, Britney Spears, Miranda Cosgrove, and Tokio Hotel. They went on to co-write and produce metal band Korn's seventh studio album See You on the Other Side which sold over two million copies worldwide.

=== The Matrix ===
"Thank God that didn't come out, you know? I had this kind of quirky, unique perspective, and they had a very mainstream-pop perspective, which was really cool, too, but I wasn't used to it. We made a record that sonically sounds brilliant but doesn't say much, even though there's a few songs I still love. My own stuff is very heart-on-my-sleeve."

— Katy Perry reflecting on the shelving of The Matrix.

Prior to the formation of The Matrix, all three members of the production team worked as performers in their own right. With this knowledge, Columbia Records executive Tim Devine suggested to The Matrix that they record and release an album of their own. The production team desired to have an outlet to release their own music, although they also wanted to avoid media attention. As a result, they recruited Adam Longlands (then performing under the stage name A.K.A.) and Katy Perry to perform lead vocals on their album. The production team was already working with Longlands on several songs prior to inviting him onto the project. Perry was suggested to The Matrix by Devine after he was introduced to her by Glen Ballard. Devine was particularly impressed with Perry's vocals and overall charisma. When speaking on why The Matrix chose Longlands and Perry to join their team, Lauren Christy explained: "The reason we picked Katy and A.K.A. is they're amazing performers. [Graham Edwards, Scott Spock, and I] like our role in the background and it shall continue to be there." Devine had suggested the team become "a real group" with a "fresh face" for the album when bringing them in.

Development for the album lasted over two years, with the team forming tentative plans to debut the material in 2004. The planned lead single, "Broken", was set for release in the spring with the self-titled album following in the early summer. In February 2004, the Los Angeles Times revealed four song titles set for inclusion on the album: "Love Is a Train", "Damn", "Another Year to Come", and "Do You Miss Me". A full album was recorded, several music videos were produced, and there were plans for a heavy promotional album campaign. The album, however, was abruptly shelved several weeks before its intended release. The Matrix explained that they cancelled the project following their dissatisfaction with the time commitments of interviews and live performances, finding that these demands gave them less time to devote to music production. Ballard later commented that the project fell apart internally, with the team being unable to even agree upon a lead single.

Four years after the shelving of The Matrix, the production team formed plans to release the album in 2008 on their own record label, Let's Hear It Records. These plans, however, were delayed after Perry's debut single, "I Kissed a Girl", achieved international commercial success in April 2008. Christy reached out to Perry in regards to releasing the album, prompting Perry to ask the team to wait until the fourth and final single from One of the Boys (2008) was released. The Matrix was officially released on iTunes on January 27, 2009, by Let's Hear It Records. When speaking on the album, Christy commented: "We don't want to be pop stars, and we're not releasing it on a major label. And it's not called 'Katy Perry and the Matrix.' These are just great songs, and I'm very proud of it." The album failed to attain any notable commercial success, while it received mixed critical reception.

== Accolades ==
The members of The Matrix are 7-time Grammy-nominated songwriters and producers and the recipients of the Ivor Novello Award for Best International Hit of the Year 2003 and BMI and ASCAP Songwriters of The Year 2004, as well as 2-time Canadian Juno winner for Pop Song of the Year and Album of The Year 2003.

== Production and songwriting discography ==
List of songs produced by The Matrix, with performing artists, showing year released and album name
Title	Year	Performer(s)	Album
"Venus or Mars"	1999	Jackson Mendoza	Non-album single
"Thank God I Kissed You"	2000	Ronan Keating	Ronan
"This Year"	2000	Christina Aguilera	My Kind of Christmas
"I Love Life"	2001	Melissa Lefton	The Princess Diaries: Original Soundtrack
"Lie, Lie, Lie"	2001	Myra	Myra
"Candy Boy"	2001	Myra	Myra
"Vete Ya"	2001	Myra	Milagros
"Bailador"	2001	Myra	Milagros
"My Hit Song"	2001	Melissa Lefton	On the Line: Original Motion Picture Soundtrack
"Welcome"	2002	Heather Nova	South
"Complicated"	2002	Avril Lavigne	Let Go
"Sk8er Boi"	2002	Avril Lavigne	Let Go
"I'm with You"	2002	Avril Lavigne	Let Go
"Anything but Ordinary"	2002	Avril Lavigne	Let Go
"Things I'll Never Say"	2002	Avril Lavigne	Let Go
"I Don't Give"	2002	Avril Lavigne	American Wedding
"Get Over It"	2002	Avril Lavigne	Sk8er Boi
"Falling Down"	2002	Avril Lavigne	Sweet Home Alabama (Original Motion Picture Soundtrack)
"The Remedy (I Won't Worry)"	2002	Jason Mraz	Waiting for My Rocket to Come
"Who Needs the World"	2002	Nick Carter	Now or Never
"Incredible (What I Meant to Say)"	2002	Darius	Dive In
"It's About Time"	2003	Lillix	Falling Uphill
"Dirty Sunshine"	2003	Lillix	Falling Uphill
"Why Can't I?"	2003	Liz Phair	Liz Phair
"Extraordinary"	2003	Liz Phair	Liz Phair
"Rock Me"	2003	Liz Phair	Liz Phair
"Favorite"	2003	Liz Phair	Liz Phair
"What Do You Do"	2003	The Troys	The Powerpuff Girls: Power Pop
"Obsession (I Love You)"	2003	Amiel	Audio Out
"All of Me"	2003	Amiel	Audio Out
"So Yesterday"	2003	Hilary Duff	Metamorphosis
"Where Did I Go Right?"	2003	Hilary Duff	Metamorphosis
"The Math"	2003	Hilary Duff	Metamorphosis
"Everyday's a Weekend"	2003	Die Happy	The Weight of the Circumstances
"Shut Up"	2003	Nick Lachey	SoulO
"Let Go"	2003	Nick Lachey	SoulO
"It's Alright"	2003	Nick Lachey	SoulO
"Shadow"	2003	Britney Spears	In the Zone
"Back in the Day"	2003	Ronan Keating	Turn It On
"She Wants to Be Me"	2003	Busted	A Present for Everyone
"3AM"	2003	Busted	A Present for Everyone
"Christine"	2004	Ben Jelen	Give It All Away
"Stay"	2004	Ben Jelen	Give It All Away
"Once Upon Our Time"	2004	Angel	Believe in Angels Believe in Me
"Angel"	2004	Angel	Believe in Angels Believe in Me
"Primitive Condition"	2004	The Mooney Suzuki	Alive & Amplified
"Alive & Amplified"	2004	The Mooney Suzuki	Alive & Amplified
"Legal High"	2004	The Mooney Suzuki	Alive & Amplified
"New York Girls"	2004	The Mooney Suzuki	Alive & Amplified
"Shake That Bush Again"	2004	The Mooney Suzuki	Alive & Amplified
"Sometimes Somethin'"	2004	The Mooney Suzuki	Alive & Amplified
"Loose 'n' Juicy"	2004	The Mooney Suzuki	Alive & Amplified
"Hot Sugar"	2004	The Mooney Suzuki	Alive & Amplified
"Messin' in the Dressin' Room"	2004	The Mooney Suzuki	Alive & Amplified
"Naked Lady"	2004	The Mooney Suzuki	Alive & Amplified
"Diary"	2004	The Mooney Suzuki	Alive & Amplified (single)
"Take a Walk"	2005	Sara Paxton	Darcy's Wild Life
"Only You"	2005	Josh Kelley	Almost Honest
"This Is Good"	2005	Ricky Martin	Life
"Sleep Tight"	2005	Ricky Martin	Life
"Don't Bother"	2005	Shakira	Oral Fixation, Vol. 2
"How Do You Do"	2005	Shakira	Oral Fixation, Vol. 2
"Hot Girls"	2005	INXS	Switch
"Perfect Strangers"	2005	INXS	Switch
"Twisted Transistor"	2005	Korn	See You on the Other Side
"Politics"	2005	Korn	See You on the Other Side
"Hypocrites"	2005	Korn	See You on the Other Side
"Souvenir"	2005	Korn	See You on the Other Side
"10 or a 2-Way"	2005	Korn	See You on the Other Side
"Throw Me Away"	2005	Korn	See You on the Other Side
"Love Song"	2005	Korn	See You on the Other Side
"Open Up"	2005	Korn	See You on the Other Side
"Coming Undone"	2005	Korn	See You on the Other Side
"Getting Off"	2005	Korn	See You on the Other Side
"Liar"	2005	Korn	See You on the Other Side
"For No One"	2005	Korn	See You on the Other Side
"Seen It All"	2005	Korn	See You on the Other Side
"Tearjerker"	2005	Korn	See You on the Other Side
"Inside Out"	2005	Korn	See You on the Other Side
"Too Late I'm Dead"	2005	Korn	See You on the Other Side
"Once Again"	2005	Moka Only	The Desired Effect
"Soundtrack to Your Life"	2006	Ashley Parker Angel	Soundtrack to Your Life
"Crazy Beautiful"	2006	Ashley Parker Angel	Soundtrack to Your Life
"Live Before I Die"	2006	Ashley Parker Angel	Soundtrack to Your Life
"Opposite of Me"	2006	Josh Kelley	Just Say the Word
"So Much for You"	2007	Ashley Tisdale	Headstrong
"Headstrong"	2007	Ashley Tisdale	Headstrong
"For You From Me"	2007	Jon McLaughlin	Indiana
"Evolution"	2007	Korn	Untitled Korn album
"Hold On"	2007	Korn	Untitled Korn album
"Innocent Bystander"	2007	Korn	Untitled Korn album
"Hushabye"	2007	Korn	Untitled Korn album
"Music Is My Boyfriend"	2007	Skye Sweetnam	Sound Soldier
"Human"	2007	Skye Sweetnam	Sound Soldier
"Boyhunter"	2007	Skye Sweetnam	Sound Soldier
"My Favorite Tune"	2007	Skye Sweetnam	Sound Soldier
"Scary Love"	2007	Skye Sweetnam	Sound Soldier
"Cartoon"	2007	Skye Sweetnam	Sound Soldier
"Make-Out Song"	2007	Skye Sweetnam	Sound Soldier
"Ultra"	2007	Skye Sweetnam	Sound Soldier
"Babydoll Gone Wrong"	2007	Skye Sweetnam	Sound Soldier
"How a Girl Feels"	2007	The Cheetah Girls	TCG
"Liberation Day"	2008	Ferras	Aliens & Rainbows
"Aliens & Rainbows"	2008	Ferras	Aliens & Rainbows
"Something About You"	2008	Ferras	Aliens & Rainbows
"Hollywood's Not America"	2008	Ferras	Aliens & Rainbows
"Everybody Bleeds the Same"	2008	Ferras	Aliens & Rainbows
"Rush"	2008	Ferras	Aliens & Rainbows
"My Beautiful Life"	2008	Ferras	Aliens & Rainbows
"Soul Rock"	2008	Ferras	Aliens & Rainbows
"Blame, Blame, Blame"	2008	Ferras	Aliens & Rainbows
"Dear God"	2008	Ferras	Aliens & Rainbows
"Don't Give Up"	2008	Ferras	Aliens & Rainbows
"Take My Lips"	2008	Ferras	Aliens & Rainbows
"Broken Man"	2008	Danger Radio	Used and Abused
"Corrupted"	2008	McFly	Radio:Active
"The End"	2008	McFly	Radio:Active
"A Word for You"	2008	Clique Girlz	Incredible
"FYI"	2009	Miranda Cosgrove	About You Now
"Guilty Pleasure"	2009	Ashley Tisdale	Guilty Pleasure
"Time's Up"	2009	Ashley Tisdale	Guilty Pleasure
"Human Connect to Human"	2009	Tokio Hotel	Humanoid
"Hey You"	2009	Tokio Hotel	Humanoid
"Love & Death"	2009	Tokio Hotel	Humanoid
"That Day"	2009	Tokio Hotel	Humanoid
"Screamin'"	2009	Tokio Hotel	Humanoid
"Attention"	2009	Tokio Hotel	Humanoid
"Down on You"	2009	Tokio Hotel	Humanoid
"Adored"	2010	Miranda Cosgrove	Sparks Fly
"Hanging"	2010	Sterling Knight	Sonny with a Chance
"How We Do This"	2010	Sterling Knight	Sonny with a Chance
"Cheers (Drink to That)"	2010	Rihanna	Loud
"Hold On 'til the Night"	2011	Greyson Chance	Hold On 'til the Night
"Take a Look at Me Now"	2011	Greyson Chance	Hold On 'til the Night
"The New Rule"	2011	The New Cities	Kill the Lights
"Heatwave"	2011	The New Cities	Kill the Lights
"I Can Love"	2012	Vicci Martinez	Vicci
"Not Washing You Off of Me"	2012	Vicci Martinez	Vicci
"Heartbreaker"	2013	Jayme Dee	Broken Record
"11:59"	2013	Michael Franti & Spearhead	All People
"Make Up"	2022	Avril Lavigne	Let Go (20th Anniversary Edition)
