= Jayme Dee =

- Born: Jayme Dee Mackinga; December 10, 1991 (age 33)
- Origin: Redondo Beach, California, US
- Genres: Pop
- Occupation(s): Singer-songwriter, guitarist
- Instrument(s): Vocals, guitar, piano
- Years active: 2010–present
- Labels: Republic (2011–14)
- Website: www.jaymedee.com

Jayme Dee (born December 10, 1991) is an American singer-songwriter and musician from Los Angeles. Her recording of the song "Rules" charted in the United States after it was featured in the movie The Hunger Games.

== Early life ==
Jayme Dee was born in Redondo Beach, California. Her mother was a professional vocal coach and violin teacher, while her father was a pastor. Every Sunday, she sang in front of her church crowd. Before she reached middle school, she received extensive training with the classical piano. During her first year in high school, she discovered a guitar while cleaning her garage. This is when she started to write and sing songs while teaching herself guitar. She started her singing career on YouTube while attending the University of Southern California to study vocal performance. Dee recorded and uploaded acoustic covers of popular songs by Katy Perry, Taylor Swift, and Lady Gaga on YouTube. She soon gained popularity and dropped out of USC, after one semester, to focus on her music career.

== Career ==
Dee performed on tour with Owl City from July to August 2012 in Toronto, New York City, Chicago, Minneapolis, Denver, Los Angeles, and Seattle.

She was signed by Republic Records in 2012, and soon afterwards was asked to record a song called "Rules" for the soundtrack The Hunger Games: Songs from District 12 and Beyond. Her song "Tip Toes" was released in 2012 as well. Her first EP, Broken Record, was released on July 30, 2013. She worked on it with Aaron Michael Cox before he died. In March 2014, Dee confirmed on her Instagram account that she had parted ways with her record label and is now an independent artist.

== Influences ==
Dee has stated that her musical influences are Amy Winehouse, John Mayer, Frank Sinatra, and Etta James.

== Personal life ==
Jayme Dee currently resides in Los Angeles with her husband, whom she wed in December 2012. The couple have a son born in 2013.

== Discography ==
=== Singles ===
- Honey (2009)
- Love Whiplash (2010)
- Rules (2012)
- Tip Toes (2012)
- Till I Fall Asleep (2013)

=== EPs ===
- Broken Record (2013)
