= Melissa Lefton =

American singer-songwriter (born 1975)

- Born: Melissa Janis Lefton; August 13, 1975 (age 51); Chicago, Illinois, United States
- Occupations: Singer, songwriter, comedian
- Musical career
- Instrument: Vocals
- Label: Jive

Melissa Janis Lefton (born August 13, 1975) is a singer and songwriter.

Lefton began playing keyboards at the age of 10. After finishing high-school she moved to New York to study communications at New York University, though decided to also focus on a career in music while studying. Melissa joined the punk rock band "Product" answering an ad in The Village Voice seeking a "theatrical female frontperson" who "wanted to be a star." Product played at venues including CBGB. They were signed and recorded an album though its release was cancelled.

Her debut solo album, Melicious, signed to Jive Records, was slated for release on August 21, 2001, but was also never released. Melicious took on topics like pollution, date-rape, occultism and murder, with tongue in cheek. Stylus Magazine gave Melicious a positive review and referred to Lefton as the "queen of shelved teenpop". AllMusic also spoke highly of the album, saying it "matches the pop sassiness of the Go-Go's and Cyndi Lauper". Lefton was also once referred to as the "anti-Britney." Seattle Weekly called her "cute, perky and evil incarnate."

Three of Lefton's songs from 2001 were commercially released. "I Love Life" appeared on the soundtrack to The Princess Diaries. "My Hit Song" appeared on the soundtrack to On the Line and also appeared on the compilation album Cool Traxx! 3. Her cover of "He Blinded Me with Science" appeared on the soundtrack to Jimmy Neutron: Boy Genius. Her track "Radio Rainbow" appears in the film Halloweentown II: Kalabar's Revenge, though the film did not release an accompanying soundtrack.

In an attempt to salvage her career, the label set her up with a manager who sent her to Los Angeles to become an actress. Discouraged with the roles she was offered she returned to New York City. She spent several years working professionally as a commercial jingle writer; Lefton's vocals can be heard in the famous commercial for Pepsi by Britney Spears as well as ads for T.J. Maxx and Chevrolet. By 2006, Lefton was in a sunshine pop band named Hello. That year they released an album on the record label Frisbie.

== Discography ==
=== Studio albums ===
- 2001: Melicious (Unreleased)

=== Videos ===
- 2001: Behind The Muse: A Mockumentary
