= Politics (song) =

Single by Korn

from the album See You on the Other Side
- Released: August 29, 2006
- Recorded: 2005
- Length: 3:16
- Label: Virgin
- Songwriters: Reginald Arvizu, Lauren Christy, Jonathan Davis, Graham Edwards, James Shaffer, David Silveria, Scott Spock
- Producers: The Matrix, Jonathan Davis

Korn singles chronology
"Coming Undone" (2006)	"Politics" (2006)	"Freak on a Leash (MTV Unplugged Version)" (2007)

"Politics" is a song by the American nu metal band Korn and The Matrix for Korn's seventh studio album, See You on the Other Side. It was released as the album's third single in August 2006 instead of the previous choice, "Love Song", and is the last Korn single to feature David Silveria on drums.

== Concept ==
"It's just about how I don't like to talk about politics. I mean there's politics in everything, and it's not necessarily governmental politics. There's who's going to sleep with whom to get ahead, who's going to do this to get that. ... I see it in the church, everyday life, government. That's what I'm talking about, not about the stupid crap that's going on with guys in suits and their views and their lobbies and their this and their that. Korn has never been a real political band. I'm political to a point where it affects human life, from global warming to abortion issues to my gun rights, stuff like that. Those are the kind of politics that I care about. The other BS with taxes or who's going to be ahead [in elections], I don't really care. Obviously even going out and voting doesn't really count, it's all based down to these Electoral College votes. What the hell can I do? It's a shame. I just wait for this president to get out of the office, and hopefully we can find someone that can do a better job. But what do we really know? Maybe he is doing the right thing, you don't know. We are all so clouded with what goes on. You understand if we didn't have oil, the United States of America would cease to exist and we'd all die? If you really think about it, oil is what keeps us all going, gets us our medicine, gets us our food, gets us every single thing." – Jonathan Davis

== Chart performance ==
The song did not reach the same success as "Twisted Transistor" and "Coming Undone", peaking at number eighteen on Billboard's Mainstream Rock Songs chart in January 2007. Promotional singles containing an array of remixes were issued to dance clubs, along with an exclusive iTunes EP coinciding with the United States midterm elections in November 2006. This would give Korn their third consecutive (and overall) charting single on Billboard's Dance/Club Play Songs chart, with a peak of number 20.

=== Charts ===
Chart (2006–07)	Peak position
US Dance/Club Play Songs (Billboard)	20
US Mainstream Rock Songs (Billboard)	18

== Music video ==
The video was shot live on August 26, 2006, at the Alpine Valley Amphitheatre in East Troy, Wisconsin, during the Family Values Tour. Along with a traditional camera shoot by Chris Kantrowitz, the band put handheld cameras in the hands of ten members of its fanclub and local area fans who were given all access passes to shoot the performance and any behind-the-scenes footage that they chose. It was released exclusively on MP3.com on October 3, 2006.

== Track listing ==
=== Digital download ===
1. "Politics" (Clean/Explicit) – 3:16
2. "Twisted Transistor" (Live in Athens, Clean/Explicit) – 3:24
3. "Hypocrites" (Live in Holland, Clean/Explicit) – 4:06

=== Digital election day EP ===
1. "Politics (Morel Pink Noise Mix)" – 4:00
2. "Politics (Claude Le Gache Edit)" – 3:54
3. "Politics (Gomi Remix Radio Edit)" – 4:03

=== US promo CD ===
1. "Politics"

=== US promo maxi-single CD #1 ===
1. "Politics (Claude LeGache Club Mix)" – 7:25
2. "Politics (Passengerez Neokon Remix)" – 6:25
3. "Politics (Claude LeGache Edit)" – 3:54
4. "Politics (Claude LeGache Mixshow Remix)" – 5:57

=== US promo maxi-single CD #2 ===
1. "Politics (Gomi Main Mix)" – 7:33
2. "Politics (Gomi Radio Edit)" – 4:03
3. "Politics (Claude LeGache Dub Mix)" – 7:22
4. "Politics (Claude LeGache French Dub Mix)" – 8:06
5. "Politics (Dave Bascombe Main)" – 2:55
6. "Politics (Dave Bascombe Instrumental)" – 2:54
