= Finally Free (song) =

2019 song by Korn

Single by Korn

from the album The Nothing
- Released: October 15, 2020
- Recorded: 2019
- Genre: Nu metal
- Length: 3:53
- Label: Roadrunner
- Songwriters: Jonathan Davis; James Shaffer; Brian Welch; Reginald Arvizu; Ray Luzier
- Producer: Nick Raskulinecz

Korn singles chronology
"Can You Hear Me" (2019)	"Finally Free" (2020)	"Start the Healing" (2021)

Music video
- "Finally Free" on YouTube

"Finally Free" is a song by American nu metal band Korn, released as the final single from their thirteenth studio album The Nothing.

== Background ==
According to guitarist Munky, the title of the song was based on the death of Deven Davis, Jonathan Davis' wife, after a considerably long battle with drug addiction.

While available as part of the album upon its release on September 13, 2019, and first played live in LA later that month, Finally Free would not see release as a single until over a year later, in mid-October 2020.

Its release as a single coincided with an accompanying music video centered around the video game World of Tanks: Blitz, to promote the newly-added Burning Games Halloween game mode. The promotional collaboration between Korn and World of Tanks allowed for players to complete challenges in "Convergence mode" to gain unique in-game prizes for a limited time.

Speaking highly of the game, Davis states that he sees a connection between gaming and rock music: "[...]because video games are intense and rock 'n' roll music is intense. It seems like they have always gone hand in hand."

Set in a barren desert landscape, music video specifically focuses on the protagonist, simply named "Captain", who fights through crowds with the end goal of reaching a Korn concert. Scenes of the band performing from the top of a tall structure are interspersed with scenes of Captain exploring this desert.

== Composition ==
Many songs on The Nothing deal heavily with loss, reflecting Davis' experience with the death with his wife Deven and his mother in quick succession. This is lyrically alluded to in "Finally Free", hinting at someone dealing with what has been described as "perhaps the deepest, most confounding loss of his life". The song is dedicated to Deven and her battle with addiction, serving as an elegy and a celebration of her life, due to being "finally free" from the torment.

Described as "more mid paced" than earlier tracks, the song initiates with weird guitar sounds leading into "a snaking groove" backed by Davis' verses, before expanding into a grand chorus, this cycle repeating until the breakdown.

== Reception ==
Finally Free has been described by Kerrang! as one of the weaker songs on The Nothing, stating it "fails to hold the [listener's] attention". A review from Louder Sound, however, lauds it as "a brilliantly dynamic banger".

== Personnel ==
- Jonathan Davis – lead vocals
- James "Munky" Shaffer – guitars
- Brian "Head" Welch – guitars
- Reginald "Fieldy" Arvizu – bass
- Ray Luzier – drums
