= Cold (Korn song) =

Promotional single by Korn

from the album The Nothing
- Released: August 2, 2019
- Genre: Hard rock; extreme metal
- Length: 3:45
- Label: Roadrunner
- Songwriters: Jonathan Davis; James Shaffer; Brian Welch; Reginald Arvizu; Ray Luzier
- Producer: Nick Raskulinecz

Korn singles chronology
| "You'll Never Find Me" (2019) | "Cold" (2019) | "Can You Hear Me" (2019) |

"Cold" is a song by American nu metal band Korn. It was released as a promotional single from their thirteenth studio album The Nothing.

== Background ==
The song was released on August 2, 2019, coupled with a dedicated visualizer designed by Nicolas Fong, featuring confusing architecture coupled with depictions of lions and ghosts.

A live video was released in November.

== Composition ==
Labelled as a "punishing anthem", the song has been considered "a more mainstream and hard rock style" than the previously released single "You'll Never Find Me", and as "one of the band's more experimental offerings".

== Reception ==
"Cold" was ranked 18th in Consequence of Sound's Top 30 Metal + Hard Rock Songs of 2019. It was also ranked 11th in Kerrang's ranking of The 20 greatest Korn songs.

A negative review of the song came from Axl Rosenberg of MetalSucks, who otherwise praised the visualizer, recommending readers "[put] the video on mute and [listen] to something else while you watch it".

== Personnel ==
- Jonathan Davis – vocals
- James "Munky" Shaffer – guitars
- Brian "Head" Welch – guitars
- Reginald "Fieldy" Arvizu – bass
- Ray Luzier – drums

== Charts ==
| Chart (2019) | Peak position |
|---|---|
| US Hot Rock & Alternative Songs (Billboard) | 39 |
