= Lauren Christy =

British songwriter

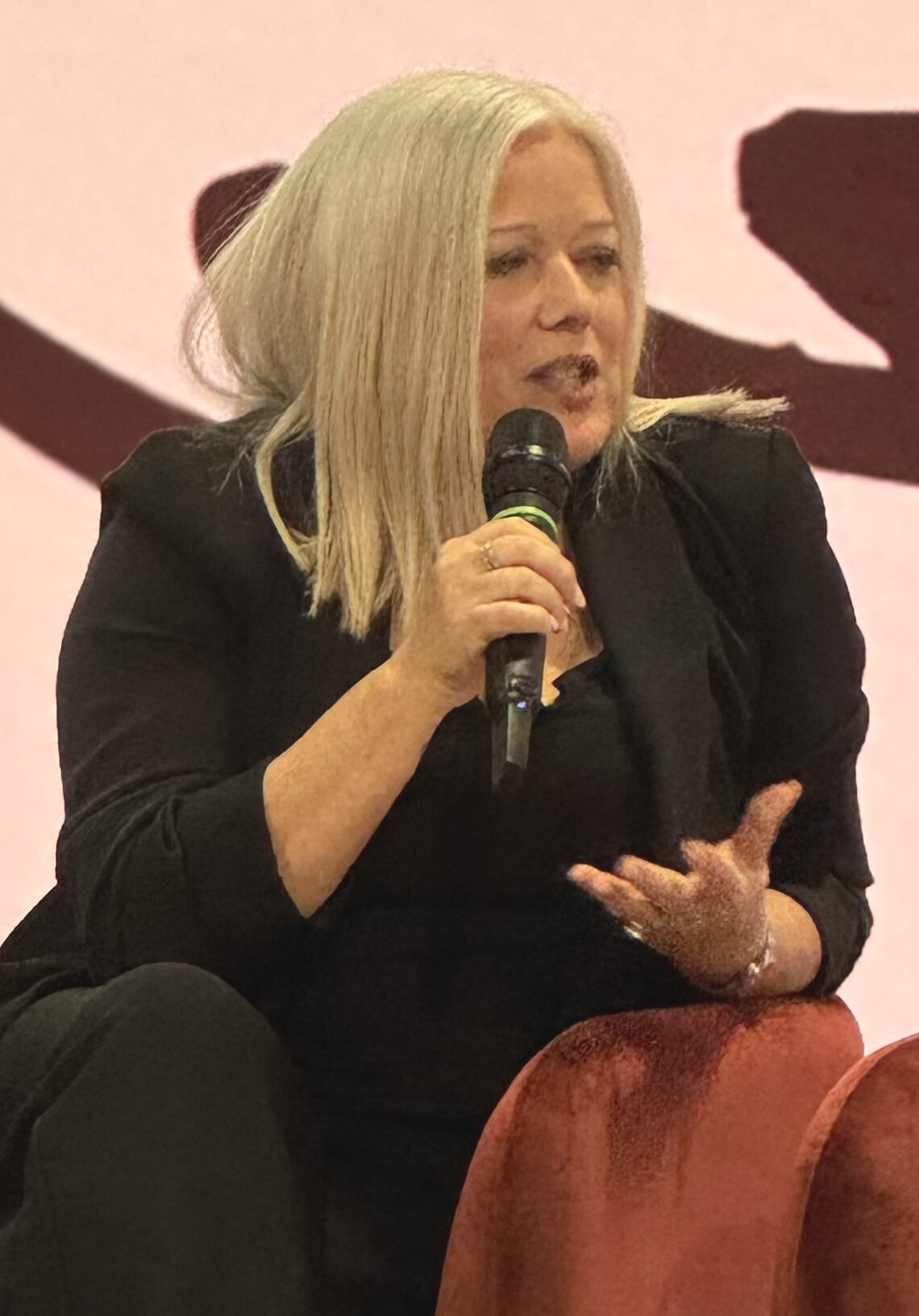
- Lauren Christy in 2025

Background information
- Origin: London, England
- Genre: Pop · rock · alternative · pop rock · film music
- Occupation: Singer · songwriter · record producer · composer
- Years active: 1993–present
- Label: Mercury · Reservoir Media · YBS Records
- Website: laurenchristy.com

Lauren Christy is a British songwriter and record producer. She began her career as a solo recording artist in the early 1990s before co-founding the production and writing trio the Matrix with Graham Edwards and Scott Spock. The group wrote and produced much of Avril Lavigne's debut album Let Go (2002). Christy and her group were nominated for the Grammy Award for Producer of the Year, Non-Classical, at the 46th Annual Grammy Awards. She won an Ivor Novello Award in 2003.

== Early life and solo career (1990s) ==
Christy studied ballet at the Bush Davies Ballet School in the United Kingdom before turning to music. At 18, she signed a publishing deal with EMI and later a recording contract with Polygram Records.

In 1991, she moved to Los Angeles, and two years later she released her debut album, Lauren Christy (1993). The album included the single "The Color of the Night", which appeared on the soundtrack of the film Color of Night (1994). In 1994, she was nominated for an American Music Award for Best New Artist.

In 1997, Christy released her second studio album, Breed, whose title track was featured on the soundtrack of the film Batman & Robin. Another track, "I Want What I Want", appeared in the 1998 film Wild Things. After her second album, Christy began writing and producing songs for other artists.

== The Matrix (1999–2010) ==
In 1999, Christy co-founded the Los Angeles-based writing and production team the Matrix with Graham Edwards and Scott Spock.

The Matrix wrote and produced much of Avril Lavigne's debut album Let Go (2002), including the singles "Complicated", "Sk8er Boi", and "I'm with You". In a 2018 interview with Music Week, Christy described "Complicated" as a turning point for the Matrix and said its success led to further work for the group. The Matrix received seven Grammy nominations and the Ivor Novello Award for International Hit of the Year. Christy received the BMI Pop Award for Songwriter of the Year in 2004.

Over the next decade, the Matrix worked with multiple artists including Jason Mraz, Shakira, Korn, David Bowie, Christina Aguilera, Britney Spears, Hilary Duff, Busted, Tokio Hotel and Rihanna.

== Later career (2011–present) ==
In 2011, Christy began working independently as a songwriter and producer. She co-wrote "Believe in Me", performed by Bonnie Tyler as the United Kingdom's entry at the Eurovision Song Contest 2013. In 2014, she received a Grammy nomination for her work on Chris Brown's album X. She co-wrote "Me, Myself & I" by G-Eazy and Bebe Rexha. She also co-wrote Iggy Azalea's first single "Team" in 2016. Additionally, she co-wrote "Tonight (I'm Lovin' You)" for Enrique Iglesias which peaked at number four on the Billboard Hot 100.

In 2019, she worked in collaboration with Korn on three songs included on their 2019 release The Nothing; "Cold", "Gravity of Discomfort", and "H@rd3r".

In 2024, she co-wrote and co-produced songs for Haiden Henderson and SkyeChristy.

In 2025, Christy released her first album in almost 30 years, Their Hits My Way, which includes her own recordings of songs she composed for other artists.

Christy conducts songwriting workshops and serves on the board of Songwriters of North America.

== Discography ==
=== Albums ===
- Lauren Christy (Mercury, 1993)
- Breed (Mercury, 1997)
- Their Hits My Way (independent, 2025)

=== Soundtrack appearances ===
- "The Color of the Night," from Color of Night (1994)
- "Breed," from Batman & Robin (1997)
- "Walk This Earth Alone," from Great Expectations (1998)
- "My Spot in the World," from 102 Dalmatians (2000)

=== Selected songwriting and production credits ===
This is a partial list of songs written or co-written by Lauren Christy.

- "Complicated" – co-written and produced for Avril Lavigne.
- "Sk8er Boi" – co-written and produced for Avril Lavigne.
- "I'm With You" – co-written and produced for Avril Lavigne.
- "So Yesterday" – co-written and produced for Hilary Duff.
- "The Remedy (I Won’t Worry)" – co-written for Jason Mraz.
- "Believe in Me" – co-written for Bonnie Tyler as the United Kingdom's entry in the Eurovision Song Contest 2013.
- "Me, Myself & I" – co-written for G-Eazy and Bebe Rexha.
- "Team" – co-written for Iggy Azalea.
- "Cold" – co-written for Korn on The Nothing.
- "Coming Undone" – co-written and co-produced for Korn.
- "Gravity of Discomfort" – co-written for Korn on The Nothing.
- "H@rd3r" – co-written for Korn on The Nothing.
- "Time for Love" – co-written for Chris Brown on X.
- "Blow Your Mind (Mwah)" – co-written for Dua Lipa.
- "I Got You" – co-written for Bebe Rexha.
- "Your Hallelujah" – co-written for Leona Lewis.
- "Liar" – co-written for Ricky Martin.
- "Baby’s in Love" – co-written for Jamie Foxx.
- "Tonight (I’m Lovin’ You)" – co-written for Enrique Iglesias.

== Awards and nominations ==
American Music Awards

- Nominated for "Best New Artist" at the 1994 American Music Awards.

Golden Globe Awards

- Nominated for Best Original Song for "The Color of the Night" at the 52nd Golden Globe Awards (1995).

Ivor Novello Awards

- International Hit of the Year for "Complicated" (2003).

Grammy Awards

- "Complicated" – nominated for Song of the Year at the 45th Annual Grammy Awards (2003).
- "I'm With You" – nominated for Song of the Year at the 46th Annual Grammy Awards (2004).
- The Matrix (Lauren Christy, Graham Edwards, Scott Spock) – nominated for Producer of the Year, Non-Classical at the 46th Grammy Awards (2004).

BMI Awards

- BMI Pop Awards in 2003 and 2004 for multiple co-written songs, including "Complicated, "Sk8er Boi", "I'm With You", "So Yesterday", and "The Remedy (I Won't Worry)".
- BMI R&B/Hip-Hop Song of the Year in 2017 for co-writing "Me, Myself & I".
