= The Nothing =

2019 studio album by Korn

Studio album by Korn
- Released: September 13, 2019
- Recorded: August 2018–Early 2019
- Studios: Rock Falcon Studio, Nashville, Tennessee; Buck Owens Studio, Bakersfield, California
- Genre: Nu metal
- Length: 44:20
- Labels: Roadrunner; Elektra
- Producer: Nick Raskulinecz

Korn chronology
The Serenity of Suffering (2016)	The Nothing (2019)	Requiem (2022)

Singles from The Nothing
- 1. "You'll Never Find Me" Released: June 25, 2019; 2. "Cold" Released: August 2, 2019; 3. "Can You Hear Me" Released: September 6, 2019; 4. "Finally Free" Released: October 15, 2020

The Nothing is the thirteenth studio album by American nu metal band Korn. It was released on September 13, 2019, through Roadrunner and Elektra. The album was produced by Nick Raskulinecz.

== Background and recording ==
According to the band's lead singer, Jonathan Davis, the title of the album was inspired by a villain from The NeverEnding Story. This is the first album recorded after the deaths of Davis' wife Deven and mother Holly Marie Chavez, which is reflected in the lyrics of songs such as "Finally Free". This affected Davis during the recording of the album, which he treated as a form of personal therapy. Some of his emotional breakdowns were recorded and ended up on the album, most notably towards the end of the intro, "The End Begins". Davis said about the album:

"I went through hell last year and had to purge what I was going through and bring the listener through that experience. I don't know how to explain it but it takes me over. When you hear me break down and cry, that's not fake. It's how I get it out. Some people go to a shrink. My music is that for me."

— Jonathan Davis

The recording process was unusually long for a Korn record as Davis stated in an interview with Kerrang! that while he would do a typical Korn record in two weeks, he spent around four months recording the vocal tracks for The Nothing.

Following the album's release, the band was scheduled to go on tour co-headlined with Alice in Chains.

== Release and promotion ==
On June 25, 2019, the band revealed the title of the album, official release date and unveiled its first single, "You'll Never Find Me", and the second, "Cold", on August 2.

On September 6, with the release of the third single "Can You Hear Me", Korn announced a six-episode podcast series. The podcast bears the same title as the album and is a fictional show about a journalist who travels to a small Kansas town to investigate a teenager's disappearance.

On the day of release, September 13, the band played an invite-only special concert. The set list included four tracks from The Nothing, three of which had not been played live previously.

== Critical reception ==
Professional ratings
Aggregate scores
Source	Rating
Metacritic	83/100
Review scores
Source	Rating
AllMusic	4.5/5 stars
Blabbermouth.net	8.5/10
Consequence of Sound	B+
Distorted Sound	9/10
Kerrang!	4/5 stars
Metal Hammer	4.5/5 stars
Metal Injection	8/10
MetalSucks	3/5 stars
NME	4/5 stars
Sputnikmusic	2/5 stars

According to the review aggregator Metacritic, The Nothing received "universal acclaim" based on a weighted average score of 83 out of 100 from 6 critic scores. It is also the highest Metacritic rating out of all Korn's albums rated on the website. AllMusic gave the album a positive review saying, "Over atmospheric NIN-like piano and towering drums, he exposes his guilt-stricken soul in a final confessional. As the swell fades away, he weeps, "I failed, I failed." It's one of the saddest moments in their catalog, a low point that ironically elevates this album to one of their strongest statements. Korn have always excelled at pain, but with The Nothing, this is the most authentic it's ever been."

Loudwire named it one of the 50 best metal albums of 2019.

== Commercial performance ==
The Nothing debuted at number eight on the US Billboard 200 with 33,000 album-equivalent units, of which 29,000 were pure album sales. It is Korn's 14th US top-10 album. As of the end of 2020, the album has sold over 80,000 traditional copies in the US.

== Track listing ==
No.	Title	Writer(s)	Length
1.	"The End Begins"	Jonathan Davis	1:31
2.	"Cold"	Davis, James Shaffer, Brian Welch, Reginald Arvizu, Ray Luzier, Lauren Christy, Nick Raskulinecz	3:46
3.	"You'll Never Find Me"	Davis, Shaffer, Welch, Arvizu, Luzier, Billy Corgan, Raskulinecz	3:41
4.	"The Darkness Is Revealing"	Davis, Shaffer, Welch, Arvizu, Luzier, Raskulinecz	3:40
5.	"Idiosyncrasy"	Davis, Shaffer, Welch, Arvizu, Luzier, Raskulinecz	4:39
6.	"The Seduction of Indulgence"	Davis	1:43
7.	"Finally Free"	Davis, Shaffer, Welch, Arvizu, Luzier	3:53
8.	"Can You Hear Me"	Davis, Shaffer, Welch, Arvizu, Luzier	2:53
9.	"The Ringmaster"	Davis, Shaffer, Welch, Arvizu, Luzier	3:01
10.	"Gravity of Discomfort"	Davis, Shaffer, Welch, Arvizu, Luzier, Christy, Raskulinecz	3:35
11.	"H@rd3r"	Davis, Shaffer, Welch, Arvizu, Luzier, Christy, Raskulinecz	4:47
12.	"This Loss"	Davis, Shaffer, Welch, Arvizu, Luzier, John Feldmann, Raskulinecz	4:41
13.	"Surrender to Failure"	Davis	2:21
Total length:			44:20

== Personnel ==
Korn

- Jonathan Davis – lead vocals, bagpipes
- James "Munky" Shaffer – guitars
- Brian "Head" Welch – guitars
- Reginald "Fieldy" Arvizu – bass
- Ray Luzier – drums

Additional personnel

- Nick Raskulinecz – producer
- David "Beno" Benveniste – executive producer
- Nick "Sluggo" Suddarth – additional production on "Can You Hear Me"
- Josh Wilbur – mixing
- Ted Jensen – mastering
- Nathan Yarborough – engineering
- Chris Collier – additional engineering
- Jim Monti – additional engineering
- Matt Wallace – additional engineering
- Guilherme Coelho – programming
- Nathan Davis – programming
- Tiago Nuñez – programming
- Jules Venturini – programming

== Charts ==
=== Weekly charts ===
Weekly chart performance for The Nothing
Chart (2019)	Peak position
Australian Albums (ARIA)	5
Austrian Albums (Ö3 Austria)	7
Belgian Albums (Ultratop Flanders)	6
Belgian Albums (Ultratop Wallonia)	8
Canadian Albums (Billboard)	11
Croatian International Albums (HDU)	35
Czech Albums (ČNS IFPI)	47
Danish Vinyl Albums (Hitlisten)	18
Dutch Albums (Album Top 100)	24
Estonian Albums (Eesti Tipp-40)	22
Finnish Albums (Suomen virallinen lista)	13
French Albums (SNEP)	9
German Albums (Offizielle Top 100)	6
Greek Albums (IFPI Greece)	23
Hungarian Albums (MAHASZ)	3
Irish Albums (IRMA)	50
Italian Albums (FIMI)	14
Japanese Albums (Oricon)	23
Latvian Albums (LAIPA)	27
Lithuanian Albums (AGATA)	95
Mexican Albums (AMPROFON)	10
New Zealand Albums (RMNZ)	10
Norwegian Vinyl Albums (VG-lista)	10
Polish Albums (ZPAV)	8
Portuguese Albums (AFP)	4
Scottish Albums (Official Charts)	6
Slovak Albums (ČNS IFPI)	12
Spanish Albums (Promusicae)	14
Swedish Albums (Sverigetopplistan)	60
Swedish Hard Rock Albums (Sverigetopplistan)	4
Swiss Albums (Schweizer Hitparade)	4
Swiss Albums (Romandie)	2
UK Albums (Official Charts)	9
UK Rock & Metal Albums (OCC)	1
US Billboard 200	8
US Indie Store Album Sales (Billboard)	1
US Top Hard Rock Albums (Billboard)	1
US Top Rock Albums (Billboard)	2

=== Year-end charts ===
Year-end chart performance for The Nothing
Chart (2019)	Position
US Top Current Album Sales (Billboard)	131
US Top Rock Albums (Billboard)	88
US Top Hard Rock Albums (Billboard)	38
