= You'll Never Find Me (song) =

Single by Korn

from the album The Nothing
- Released: June 25, 2019
- Genre: Nu metal
- Length: 3:41
- Label: Roadrunner
- Songwriters: Jonathan Davis; James Shaffer; Brian Welch; Reginald Arvizu; Ray Luzier; Billy Corgan
- Producer: Nick Raskulinecz

Korn singles chronology
"Black Is the Soul" (2017)	"You'll Never Find Me" (2019)	"Cold" (2019)

Music video
- "You'll Never Find Me" on YouTube

"You'll Never Find Me" is a song by American nu metal band Korn. It was released on June 25, 2019, as the lead single from the band's thirteenth studio album, The Nothing (2019).

== Background ==
The initial working title of the song, "Smog Check", was due to the day of its recording coinciding with a car mechanic appointment for guitarist Brian Welch.

The official visualizer, released on YouTube the day after its release, features a hanging, pulsating anthropomorphic structure composed of black wires, which also features on the album's artwork. The visualizer was produced by Chris Schoenman.

A music video, described by NME as "chilling" and "bleak", was later released on July 17. This video, directed by Andzej Gavriss, features the band performing in a desert landscape interspersed with an "intriguing narrative" of a form of experimentation.

Along with the single was revealed the release date of The Nothing, its track listing, and commentary from Davis regarding the title of the album.

== Composition ==
"You'll Never Find Me" has been described by Revolver as containing "a bulky, staccato riff" characteristic of Korn's other songs, and a "vertically leaping repeating groove". It has also been described as reminiscent of songs from their prior albums Untouchables and Take a Look in the Mirror, with the songs "Break Some Off" and "Bottled Up Inside" highlighted specifically due to the similarity in pre-chorus buildup between the three. The ending of the song has been compared to that of their iconic 1994 song "Daddy".

== Reception ==
"You'll Never Find Me" was ranked 16th in Kerrang's ranking of "The 20 greatest Korn songs".

== Personnel ==
- Jonathan Davis – vocals
- James "Munky" Shaffer – guitars
- Brian "Head" Welch – guitars
- Reginald "Fieldy" Arvizu – bass
- Ray Luzier – drums

== Charts ==
Chart performance for "You'll Never Find Me"
Chart (2019)	Peak position
Czech Republic Rock (IFPI)	18
Finland (Suomen virallinen lista)	56
German Alternative Singles (Deutsche Alternative Charts)	2
US Hot Rock & Alternative Songs (Billboard)	27
US Rock & Alternative Airplay (Billboard)	19
