= See You on the Other Side (Korn album) =

Studio album by Korn
- Released: December 6, 2005
- Recorded: June–November 2005
- Studios: Jonathan Davis' home studio in Los Angeles, California
- Genres: Nu metal; alternative metal; industrial
- Length: 61:01
- Labels: EMI; Virgin
- Producers: Jonathan Davis; Atticus Ross; The Matrix

Korn chronology
Greatest Hits Vol. 1 (2004)	See You on the Other Side (2005)	Live & Rare (2006)

Singles from See You on the Other Side
- 1. "Twisted Transistor" Released: September 27, 2005; 2. "Coming Undone" Released: February 21, 2006; 3. "Politics" Released: August 29, 2006

See You on the Other Side is the seventh studio album by American nu metal band Korn. It was released on December 6, 2005, by Virgin Records. It is their first album as a quartet after the departure of founding guitarist Brian "Head" Welch and the last album with original drummer David Silveria before he departed from the band in December 2006. The album was first certified gold in the United States on January 12, 2006; a subsequent platinum record certification was awarded on March 16, 2006. In the album, Korn experimented with different musical styles and even collaborated with pop music producers The Matrix.

Critical reaction of the album was generally positive. However, criticisms of the album focused on the musical production by The Matrix and songwriting.

== Production ==
After completing their record deal with Sony BMG in 2004, Korn partnered with EMI Records and signed to Virgin Records. As part of this innovative arrangement, Virgin paid Korn $25 million in exchange for a share in the profits of See You on the Other Side and the band's next album, including tours and merchandising. Virgin also received a 30 percent stake in the band's licensing, ticket sales and other revenue sources. The album was recorded in Jonathan Davis' home studio which was used for the previous album, Take a Look in the Mirror, as well as the Queen of the Damned soundtrack and score. Davis stated "We went through a lot of drama with Head leaving and getting off our label and making the album by ourselves." Regarding Brian "Head" Welch's departure, James "Munky" Shaffer recalled "There was kind of a moment where we didn't know what we were going to do and how we were going to continue. We kind of decided, 'OK, we can just sit back and we can put out a greatest hits album and end this or we can use this opportunity and instead of looking at it as a loss, reinvent what we do.'"

=== Cover art ===
The album features layout design and an original painting by the American surrealist/gothic painter David Stoupakis on the cover. Eleven more paintings by the artist appear as additional artwork on the deluxe special edition.

=== Promotion ===
The lead single, "Twisted Transistor", premiered on KDGE 102.1 FM The Edge in Dallas-Fort Worth, Texas, and was officially released to radio on September 27, 2005. Brent Decker e-mailed the disc jockey of the night, Ayo, with a request to play the rumored single. The band also did a See You on the Other Side world tour to heavily promote the album, which included a special performance of "Here to Stay" on a plane from London to New York City.

=== Music ===
See You on the Other Side sees Korn adding elements of genres such as industrial, gothic rock, new wave, electronic/electronica, and funk. Additionally, the album had contributions by pop production team The Matrix, who had previously worked with pop acts like Avril Lavigne, Britney Spears, and Shakira.

With regards to the album's musical direction, frontman Jonathan Davis commented,

It's funky, it's heavy, it's dark, and sometimes, industrial-tinged. Working with so many different people and everything, it's made it out to be a really well-rounded album of a lot of different things. It's definitely Korn, it's definitely groove-oriented. But it's our most experimental album to date. We're very excited. We're all sitting around, when we listen to it, looking at each other going, 'I can't believe that's us.' I think people are really going to dig it.

== Reception ==
=== Critical reception ===
Professional ratings
Aggregate scores
Source	Rating
Metacritic	64/100
Review scores
Source	Rating
AllMusic	3.5/5 stars
Blabbermouth.net	6/10
Blender	3/5 stars
Drowned in Sound	4/10
Entertainment Weekly	B+
IGN	7.7/10
The New York Times	Positive
NME	5/10
Q	3/5 stars
Rolling Stone	3/5 stars

According to the review aggregator Metacritic, See You on the Other Side received "generally favorable reviews" based on a weighted average score of 64 out of 100 from 14 critic scores. The involvement of producer The Matrix, whose background was primarily in pop music, had varied reception. For The New York Times, Jon Pareles praised The Matrix for "[adding] depth and dynamics rather than blatant hooks". Grading the album with a B-plus, Michael Endelman of Entertainment Weekly called the album "sonically stunning" and noted the wide range of styles in "sweeping goth anthems and trippy electronica". Erin Fox of metal website The Gauntlet rated the album five out of five points, describing it as "perhaps the definitive representation of artistic expression" by Korn.

However, the production and lyrics were received negatively by others. For Blabbermouth.net, Don Kaye rated the album six out of 10 points and found "a curiously distant, mechanical sound" resulting from the production, for instance the "heavily multi-tracked" vocals of Jonathan Davis. Kaye also panned the songwriting: "...between self-pity and adolescent sex talk." However, Johnny Loftus of AllMusic was more complimentary of the song subject matter, as an "acknowledgement that their life isn't all that bad, and it's time to party", while conceding that the album sounded "a little too processed at times" in a three-and-a-half stars out of five review.

Rating the album three out of five stars, Virgin Media called "Twisted Transistor" the strongest track while criticizing the production of "Hypocrites" and "For No One" as having "layer-upon-layer of distortion and effects rather than stripped down to its raw elements." Niall O'Keeffe of Yahoo! Music was especially harsh, regarding Korn's style as outdated: "The nu-metal scene for which they were standard-bearers is ancient history, even in its heartlands." O'Keeffe also objected to sexual lyrics in "10 or a 2-Way" as written in the "crassest, most misogynistic way imaginable."

The album was ranked second in Ultimate Guitar's Top 10 albums of 2005 poll. In 2022, Revolver ranked the album the tenth best of Korn's 14 albums.

=== Commercial performance ===
See You on the Other Side sold more than 220,000 copies in its first week, debuting and peaking at number three on the Billboard 200. The album managed to stay in the top half of the chart for thirty-four consecutive weeks. It has accumulated 1.2 million copies sold in the United States according to Nielsen SoundScan.

== Track listing ==
No.	Title	Writer(s)	Length
1.	"Twisted Transistor" ( (Note: Later prints of the album have the intro separated from the song as a pregap))	Jonathan Davis; Reginald Arvizu; James Shaffer; David Silveria; The Matrix	4:12
2.	"Politics"	Davis; Arvizu; Shaffer; Silveria; The Matrix	3:16
3.	"Hypocrites"	Davis; Arvizu; Shaffer; Silveria; The Matrix	3:49
4.	"Souvenir"	Davis; Arvizu; Shaffer; Silveria; The Matrix	3:50
5.	"10 or a 2-Way"	Davis; Arvizu; Shaffer; Silveria; The Matrix; Atticus Ross	4:41
6.	"Throw Me Away"	Davis; Arvizu; Shaffer; Silveria; The Matrix; A. Ross	4:41
7.	"Love Song"	Davis; Arvizu; Shaffer; Silveria; The Matrix; A. Ross	4:18
8.	"Open Up"	Davis; Arvizu; Shaffer; Silveria; The Matrix; A. Ross	6:15
9.	"Coming Undone"	Davis; Arvizu; Shaffer; Silveria; The Matrix	3:19
10.	"Getting Off"	Davis; Arvizu; Shaffer; Silveria; The Matrix	3:25
11.	"Liar"	Davis; Arvizu; Shaffer; Silveria; The Matrix	4:14
12.	"For No One"	Davis; Arvizu; Shaffer; Silveria; The Matrix	3:37
13.	"Seen It All"	Davis; Arvizu; Shaffer; Silveria; The Matrix	6:19
14.	"Tearjerker"	Davis; Arvizu; Shaffer; Silveria; The Matrix; A. Ross; Leopold Ross	5:05
Total length:			61:01

iTunes special edition bonus track
No.	Title	Length
15.	"Inside Out"	3:26
Total length:		64:27

Japanese edition bonus track
No.	Title	Length
15.	"Too Late I'm Dead"	3:27
Total length:		64:28

Special edition bonus CD
No.	Title	Length
1.	"It's Me Again"	3:35
2.	"Eaten Up Inside"	3:18
3.	"Last Legal Drug (Le Petit Mort)"	5:15
4.	"Twisted Transistor (The Dante Ross Mix)"	3:29
5.	"Twisted Transistor (Dummies Club Mix)"	7:53
Total length:		23:30

Vinyl and Best Buy edition bonus track
No.	Title	Length
15.	"Last Legal Drug (Le Petit Mort)"	5:15
Total length:		66:16

== Personnel ==
=== Korn ===
- Jonathan Davis – lead vocals, bagpipes
- James "Munky" Shaffer – guitars, backing vocals
- Reginald "Fieldy" Arvizu – bass
- David Silveria – drums

=== Additional musicians ===
- Atticus Ross – programming on tracks 5–8, 13, 14, 3B
- Chris "Hollywood" Holmes – additional programming on tracks 1–4, 9–12, 1B, 2B, 4B, 5B
- Dante Ross – keyboards on "Twisted Transistor (The Dante Ross Mix)"
- Peter Levin – keyboards on "Twisted Transistor (The Dante Ross Mix)"
- Jess Blockton – guitars on "Twisted Transistor (The Dante Ross Mix)"
- Sergio Vega – bass on "Twisted Transistor (The Dante Ross Mix)"

=== Production ===
- Jonathan Davis – production
- Atticus Ross – production on tracks 5–8, 13, 14, 3B
- The Matrix – production on tracks 1–4, 9–12, 1B, 2B, 4B, 5B
- Jeffrey Kwatinetz – executive production
- Terry Date – mixing
- Kevin Mills – mixing assistant
- Jon Berkowitz – mixing assistant
- Frank Filipetti – recording
- Jim Monti – recording assistant
- Tim Harking – recording assistant
- Leo Ross – production assistant on tracks 5–8, 13, 14, 3B, additional production on "Tearjerker"
- Dante Ross – remixing on "Twisted Transistor (The Dante Ross Mix)"
- Lucid Olason – engineering, Pro Tools editing
- The Dummies – additional remixing & production on "Twisted Transistor (Dummies Club Mix)"
- Steve Miller – mixing on "Twisted Transistor (Dummies Club Mix)"
- Ted Jensen – mastering

== Chart positions ==
=== Weekly charts ===
Chart (2005–2006)	Peak position
Australian Albums (ARIA)	19
Austrian Albums (Ö3 Austria)	7
Belgian Albums (Ultratop Flanders)	49
Belgian Albums (Ultratop Wallonia)	61
Dutch Albums (Album Top 100)	37
European Albums (Billboard)	13
Finnish Albums (Suomen virallinen lista)	18
French Albums (SNEP)	24
German Albums (Offizielle Top 100)	12
Greek Albums (IFPI)	5
Irish Albums (IRMA)	70
Italian Albums (FIMI)	23
New Zealand Albums (RMNZ)	8
Norwegian Albums (VG-lista)	37
Polish Albums Chart	46
Scottish Albums (Official Charts)	70
Spanish Albums (Promusicae)	82
Swedish Albums (Sverigetopplistan)	35
Swiss Albums (Schweizer Hitparade)	11
UK Albums (Official Charts)	71
UK Rock & Metal Albums (Official Charts)	5
US Billboard 200	3
US Top Rock Albums (Billboard)	4

=== Year-end charts ===
Chart (2006)	Position
Austrian Albums (Ö3 Austria)	57
US Billboard 200	42
US Top Rock Albums (Billboard)	25

== Certifications ==
Region	Certification	Certified units/sales
Australia (ARIA)	Gold	35,000^{^}
Brazil (Pro-Música Brasil)	Gold	50,000^{*}
Canada (Music Canada)	Gold	50,000^{^}
Germany (BVMI)	Gold	100,000^{^}
New Zealand (RMNZ)	Platinum	15,000^{^}
United Kingdom (BPI)	Silver	60,000^{*}
United States (RIAA)	Platinum	1,000,000^{^}
^{*} Sales figures based on certification alone.^{^} Shipments figures based on certification alone.
