= Coming Undone =

Single by Korn

from the album See You on the Other Side
- Released: February 21, 2006
- Recorded: 2005
- Genre: Nu metal; hard rock
- Length: 3:18
- Label: Virgin; EMI
- Songwriters: Reginald Arvizu; Lauren Christy; Jonathan Davis; Graham Edwards; James Shaffer; David Silveria; Scott Spock
- Producers: The Matrix; Jonathan Davis

Korn singles chronology
"Twisted Transistor" (2005)	"Coming Undone" (2006)	"Politics" (2006)

Music video
- "Coming Undone" on YouTube

"Coming Undone" is a song written and recorded by American nu metal band Korn and The Matrix for Korn's seventh studio album, See You on the Other Side. It was released as the album's second single in February 2006.

== Release ==
The song reached number four on Billboard's Mainstream Rock Songs chart and number fourteen on the Modern Rock Tracks chart. It also peaked at number seventy-nine on the Hot 100, making it Korn's fourth biggest hit on the chart.

== Music video ==
The video was directed by Little X, his second time behind the lens for a rock band. The video begins with Korn performing in a desert in broad daylight. The sky begins to shatter like glass during the chorus to reveal a night sky. Later, the whole background shatters, leaving a plain white background. Lastly, they literally become undone while continuing to perform, and as they do, they resemble slinkies. The band is completely unraveled and gone by the ending of the video.

== Live performances ==
The song is frequently played live, most recently as a combination with Queen's "We Will Rock You" during the first chorus. It is the only song from See You on the Other Side that has remained a staple of their live set. It has also been performed several times on television, including Jimmy Kimmel Live! and Spike TV's Scream Awards.

== Appearances in media ==
Former Detroit Tigers third baseman Brandon Inge used the song as his walkup song when batting. It was also used as the walkup song for Hunter Pence when he played for the Philadelphia Phillies. It was also featured in a commercial for the CBS crime drama series Criminal Minds and in the video games Blitz: The League and The Bigs 2. An instrumental version is used for the TNA wrestler Frankie Kazarian, also known as Kaz. It also appeared in VH1's "100 Most Shocking Music Moments" in the discussion of the Woodstock 1999; both "Did My Time" and "Coming Undone" are heard in the background.

== Track listing ==
=== UK release ===
- 7" VUS323
1. "Coming Undone (Dave Bascombe Radio Edit)" – 3:03
2. "Eaten Up Inside" – 3:18
- CD5" VUSCD323
1. "Coming Undone (Dave Bascombe Radio Edit)" – 3:03
2. "Eaten Up Inside" – 3:18

== Charts ==
Chart (2006)	Peak position
Australia (ARIA)	54
Germany (Media Control AG)	86
Iceland (Fréttablaðið Top 20)	15
Italy (FIMI)	36
Italy (Hit Parade)	48
Ireland (IRMA)	49
Latvian Airplay (LAIPA)	25
New Zealand (RIANZ)	16
Quebec Airplay (ADISQ)	47
Scotland Singles (OCC)	46
UK Singles (OCC)	63
US Billboard Hot 100	79
US Modern Rock Tracks (Billboard)	14
US Dance/Club Play Songs (Billboard)	29
US Mainstream Rock Songs (Billboard)	4
US Pop 100 (Billboard)	73

== Certifications ==
Region	Certification	Certified units/sales
New Zealand (RMNZ)	2× Platinum	60,000^{‡}
United Kingdom (BPI)	Silver	200,000^{‡}
^{‡} Sales+streaming figures based on certification alone.

== Mash-up ==
Korn and Atlanta crunk rappers Dem Franchize Boyz did a mash-up of their respective hit singles at the time, "Coming Undone" and "Lean wit It, Rock wit It", titled "Coming Undone wit It". It was produced by Jermaine Dupri and Scott Spock from The Matrix, and was first released on AOL in April 2006. A video for "Coming Undone wit It" was released on the DVD portion of Chopped, Screwed, Live and Unglued. This is the official remix to both songs.

Various elements of the two songs were combined with new parts exclusive to the mashup, produced by Scott Spock of The Matrix.

"It's all energy; Crunk music's like heavy hip-hop, so it mixes right. It's perfect ... The songs are at almost the same tempo and I knew it would work right off. So we hooked up with the boys ... and they're talented. It's fun and just different." – Jonathan Davis

=== Track listing ===
1. "Coming Undone wit It" (radio version) – 3:30
2. "Coming Undone wit It" (album version) – 3:30
3. "Coming Undone wit It" (instrumental) – 3:30
4. "Coming Undone wit It" (a cappella) – 3:30
