= Freak on a Leash =

1999 single by Korn

Single by Korn

from the album Follow the Leader
- Released: February 1999
- Recorded: 1998
- Genre: Nu metal; alternative metal
- Length: 4:27 (full version); 4:15 (album version); 3:46 (clean radio edit)
- Label: Immortal; Epic
- Songwriters: Jonathan Davis; James Shaffer; Reginald Arvizu; Brian Welch; David Silveria
- Producers: Korn; Steve Thompson; Toby Wright

Korn singles chronology
"B.B.K." (1998)	"Freak on a Leash" (1999)	"Falling Away from Me" (1999)

Music video
- "Freak on a Leash" on YouTube

"Freak on a Leash"

Single by Korn

from the album MTV Unplugged
- Released: 2007
- Recorded: December 9, 2006, at MTV Studios in Times Square, New York City
- Length: 3:55
- Label: Virgin; Epic
- Songwriters: Jonathan Davis; James Shaffer; Reginald Arvizu; Brian Welch; David Silveria
- Producers: Richard Gibbs; Alex Coletti

Korn singles chronology
"Politics" (2006)	"Freak on a Leash" (2007)	"Evolution" (2007)

Amy Lee singles chronology
"Broken" (2004)	"Freak on a Leash" (2007)	"Speak to Me" (2016)

"Freak on a Leash" is a song by the American nu metal band Korn, featured on the group's 1998 studio album, Follow the Leader. After Follow the Leader's release, the song was released as a single in February 1999, and since then, it has been re-released over ten times. The song uses dissonance, distortion, various guitar effects, and a heavy, aggressive style.

The single peaked at number six on the Alternative Songs chart, 10 on the Mainstream Rock Songs chart, and 24 on the UK Singles Chart.

The "Freak on a Leash" music video was released on February 5, 1999. Directed by Todd McFarlane in Los Angeles, California, the video explores both animation and live performances mixed together. The video won seven awards and was retired from Total Request Live.

== Origins ==
Following the release of Follow the Leader, Korn promoted the studio album by headlining the Family Values Tour in 1998. The tour ran from September 22 until October 31. "Freak on a Leash" was the first song played on their first tour date. The original composition had a "noisy guitar break in the middle," but, after the group found out that radio stations are not fond of "noisy guitar breaks," they voted 4–1 to remove the break, with Jonathan Davis being the lone holdout. The band described the break as "the Biohazard part."

Guitarist Brian "Head" Welch said that the song "was about Jonathan Davis being a freak on a leash—sort of a kinky dominatrix thing." Leah Furman said that the song "revolved around the mixed blessings of fame"; Davis confirmed in a track-by-track breakdown that the song "rails out against the music industry. It's about how I feel like I'm a fuckin' prostitute".

"Freak on a Leash" was written in 1997 and recorded in May 1998 at NRG Recording Studios in North Hollywood, California. Since its first release in the United Kingdom, it has been released over ten times. It was released in the United Kingdom three times, twice in Mexico and Australia, once in Germany, once in France, once in the United States, and once in Switzerland.

== Composition ==
"Freak on a Leash" is four minutes and 15 seconds long. The song uses dissonance, distortion, and various effects to bring the song "to life." David Lloyd from the University of Alberta said that the song was an example of a "nonsense-utterance" technique used by lead vocalist Jonathan Davis. Lloyd also noted that the song contained "fragments of English-language words," and said that they "can be perceived in the midst of Davis' gibberish". Lloyd went on to say that "Davis is giving voice to his inner basic feelings which are trying to resist being shaped or conditioned by utterances of others." It expresses moods such as anger, drama, and sarcasm.

== Alternate Versions ==
An acoustic rendition of the song was recorded with Davis singing a duet with Amy Lee of Evanescence, at MTV studios in Times Square, New York City for Korn's acoustic set on December 9, 2006.

On July 16 and 17, 2026, Davis performed a new orchestral arrangement of "Freak on a Leash" created by Japanese musician and composer Yoshiki during Yoshiki Classical 2026 at Walt Disney Concert Hall.

== Music video ==
A screenshot from the "Freak on a Leash" music video

A music video for "Freak on a Leash" was released on February 5, 1999, and debuted on Total Request Live. It was directed by Todd McFarlane who was assisted by Jonathan Dayton and Valerie Faris. The music video contains a mixture of animation and live performance footage. Although it was expected to be released in January 1999, it was pushed back to February 1999. The video starts with an animated segment directed by McFarlane, where the children (including a cameo appearance by Korn), playing hopscotch on the cliff from the Follow the Leader cover, are interrupted by a policeman. An accidentally-fired bullet from the policeman's gun dodges a little girl wearing a long red dress and matching hair ribbon then breaks out of the animated world and into the real world while wreaking much property damage while narrowly avoiding hitting people. The bullet then enters a Korn poster exactly at the break in the middle of the song and flies around the band members before Jonathan Davis shouts "Go!", signaling the end of the break, to send the bullet back the way it came until it returns to the animated world. Once back in the animated world, the girl in red (also from the album cover) catches the bullet and gives it to the policeman. The policeman stares at his hands bewildered as the children all leave and the camera then focuses on the loose "No Trespassing" sign, which then leads up to the follow-up video for "Falling Away from Me" featured on the band's then next album Issues. The directorial work was described as combining "special effects and clever camera moves in the live action portion of the video."

The video won awards for Best Editing and Best Rock Video at the 1999 MTV Video Music Awards, and later received the Grammy Award for Best Short Form Music Video in 2000. It became the ninth video that was retired from Total Request Live on May 11, 1999. The music video was also featured on Deuce in 2002. In 2018, the staff of Metal Hammer included the video in the site's list of "the 13 best nu metal videos".

== Reception ==
David Lloyd said it was Korn's most popular song, and on July 8, 1999, the song was the ninth most-infringed song on the Internet. iTunes said that "Wright and Thompson bring a brighter, sharper sheen to Korn's sound, which helped make huge hits out of 'Freak on a Leash'." Allmusic editor highlighted the song. David Fricke characterized the vocals as "caged-animal babble (the Busta Rhymes-in-Bellevue outburst in "Freak on a Leash")..." In their review of the Follow The Leader album, Yahoo Music! highlighted this track as an example of Davis "delv[ing] into his own personal demons", in this case, those that were ongoing at the time rather than in the past.

It was rated the sixth-top single of 1999 by Spin. It reached number six on the Billboard Modern Rock Tracks chart and number ten on the Mainstream Rock Tracks chart, and was successful on the Hot 100 charting number 89. It was also immensely popular in Australia where the single was certified Gold for shipments in excess of 35,000 units. The song appeared on VH1's list of the "40 Greatest Metal Songs" at number twenty-three.

The music video debuted at number eight on MTV's Total Request Live on February 9, 1999, and peaking at number 1 on its thirteenth day, February 25. and spent ten non-consecutive days at the top position until its "retirement", on May 11, 1999. It won the Grammy Award for Best Short Form Music Video and the 1999 Metal Edge Readers' Choice Award for "Music Video of the Year". It was also nominated for nine 1999 MTV Video Music Awards, including Best Direction. It won two, Best Rock Video and Best Editing.

The song made VH1's "100 Greatest Songs of the 90s" list at number sixty-nine, and VH1's "100 Greatest Hard Rock Songs" at number forty-eight. In 2017, Spin ranked it as number one on their list of the 30 greatest nu metal songs of all time. In 2019, Loudwire ranked the song number one on their list of the 50 greatest Korn songs, and in 2021, Kerrang ranked the song number four on their list of the 20 greatest Korn songs.

"Freak on a Leash" won six awards and was nominated seventeen times. The song won two MTV Music Awards, one Billboard Music Award, one Grammy Award, and one Metals' Edge Readers Choice Award. Mexican station 91X ranked it 7th on their "Top 91 of 1999" list.

== Accolades ==
Publication	List	Rank
Billboard	The 99 Greatest Songs of 1999: Critics’ Picks	36
Billboard	The 10 Best ’90s Music Videos: Poll Results	4
Cleveland	50 Greatest Music Videos of the 90's	19
Digitaldreamdoor	100 Greatest Rock Songs of 1998	9
Kerrang!	100 Greatest Singles of All Time	2
Loudwire	10 Greatest Metal Songs of the 90's By Year	–
Loudwire	66 Best Rock Songs of the 90's	–
Loudersound (United States)	100 Best Metal Songs of the 90's	21
MTV	The 30 Greatest Music Videos of the 90's	23
MTV	TRL Top 10 Countdown	1
MTV	MTV's TRL Top 99 of 1999	2
MuchMusic	Top 30 Countdown	1
Rolling Stone (United States)	Rob Sheffield's 99 Best Songs of 1999	71
Singers Room	100 Greatest Popular Songs of the 1990's	69
Spin	30 Best Nu-Metal Songs, Ranked	1
Spin	The 69 Best Alternative Songs from 1999	13
Triple J Hottest 100 of All Time, 2009	Hottest 100 of All Time	17
VH1	100 Greatest Songs of the 90's	69
VH1	100 Greatest Videos	22

=== Billboard Music Awards ===
Year	Nominee / work	Award	Result	Ref.
1999	"Freak on a Leash"	Best Hard Rock Clip	Won	
1999	"Freak on a Leash"	Best Modern Rock Clip	Nominated	

=== California Music Awards ===
Beginning in 1978 and continuing until the magazine ceased publication in 1999, BAM magazine presented the Bay Area Music Awards, also known as the Bammies, in an annual awards ceremony honoring accomplishments of the Bay Area music community. The awards ceremony continued for a couple more years with its name changed to the California Music Awards and absent its prior focus on the music of the Bay Area.

Year	Nominee / work	Award	Result
1999	Freak on a Leash	Outstanding Single	Nominated

=== Edison Music Awards ===
Award ceremony est. in the Netherlands

Year	Nominee / work	Award	Result
1999	Korn/Freak on a Leash	Best Alternative Act	Won

=== Grammy Awards ===
The Grammy Awards are awarded annually by the National Academy of Recording Arts and Sciences. "Freak on a Leash" has received one award from two nominations.

Year	Nominee / work	Award	Result
2000	"Freak on a Leash"	Best Hard Rock Performance	Nominated
2000	"Freak on a Leash"	Best Short Form Music Video	Won

=== Metals Edge Readers' Choice Awards ===
Year	Nominee / work	Award	Result	Ref.
1999	"Freak on a Leash"	Music Video of the Year	Won	

=== MTV Video Music Awards ===
Year	Nominee / work	Award	Result
1999	"Freak on a Leash"	Best Rock Video	Won
1999	"Freak on a Leash"	Breakthrough Video	Nominated
1999	"Freak on a Leash"	Best Direction	Nominated
1999	"Freak on a Leash"	Best Special Effects	Nominated
1999	"Freak on a Leash"	Best Art Direction	Nominated
1999	"Freak on a Leash"	Best Editing	Won
1999	"Freak on a Leash"	Best Cinematography	Nominated
1999	"Freak on a Leash"	Viewer's Choice	Nominated
1999	"Freak on a Leash"	Video of the Year	Nominated

=== MuchMusic Video Awards ===
The MuchMusic Video Awards is an annual awards ceremony presented by the Canadian music video channel MuchMusic. "Freak on a Leash" has one nomination.

Year	Nominee / work	Award	Result
1999	"Freak on a Leash"	Best International Video	Nominated

=== Spin Readers' Choice Awards ===
Year	Nominee / work	Award	Result
1999	"Freak on a Leash"	Best Video	Won

== Appearances in media ==
In early February 1999, "Freak on a Leash" was used in a Puma television advertisement that debuted during the Super Bowl pre-game show, featuring Korn's live performance interspersed with Serena Williams and Vince Carter competing in their respective sports.

The song was briefly played in a 2007 episode of The Simpsons titled "Stop! Or My Dog Will Shoot", while the family pet Santa's Little Helper is looking for Homer Simpson in a corn maze.

In 2008, the song was featured in the video game Guitar Hero World Tour.

== Formats and track listings ==
European single #1

#	Name	Notes	Time	Ref
1.	"Freak On A Leash"	Album Version	4:15	
2.	Freak On A Leash"	Freakin' Bitch Mix	4:01	
3.	"Freak On A Leash"	Josh A's Beast On A Leash Mix	4:18	
4.	"Freak On A Leash"	Lethal Freak Mix	3:38	

US single #1

#	Name	Notes	Time	Ref
1.	"Freak On A Leash"	Album Version	4:15	
2.	"Freak On A Leash"	Dante Ross Mix	4:46	
3.	"Freak On A Leash"	Freakin' Bitch Mix	4:01	
4.	"Freak On A Leash"	Josh A's Beast On A Leash Mix	4:18	
5.	"Freak On A Leash"	Lethal Freak Mix	3:38	

UK single #1

#	Name	Notes	Time	Ref
1.	Freak On A Leash	Album Version	4:15	
2.	Freak On A Leash	Dante Ross Mix	4:46	
3.	Freak On A Leash	Josh A's Beast On A Leash Mix	4:17	
4.	Freak On A Leash	Video	3:07	

Swedish single #1

#	Name	Notes	Time	Ref
1.	Freak On A Leash	Album Version	4:15	
2.	Freak On A Leash	Dante Ross Remix	4:46	

Australian single #1

#	Name	Notes	Time	Ref
1.	"Freak On A Leash"	Album Version	4:15	
2.	"Freak On A Leash"	Freakin' Bitch Mix	4:00	
3.	"Freak On A Leash"	Josh A's Beast On A Leash Mix	4:17	
4.	"Freak On A Leash"	Lethal Freak Mix	3:39	
5.	"Freak On A Leash"	Dante Ross Mix	4:46	

European single #2

#	Name	Notes	Time	Ref
1.	"Freak On A Leash"	Album Version	4:15	
2.	"Freak On A Leash"	Dante Ross Mix	4:46	
3.	"Freak On A Leash"	Freakin' Bitch Mix	4:00	
4.	"Freak On A Leash"	Josh A's Beast On A Leash Mix	4:17	
5.	"Freak On A Leash"	Lethal Freak Mix	3:39	
6.	"Freak On A Leash"	One Shot Remix	5:03	

Mexican single

#	Name	Notes	Time	Ref
1.	"Freak On A Leash"	Album Version	4:18	
2.	"Freak On A Leash"	Dante Ross Mix	4:47	
3.	"Freak On A Leash"	Freakin' Bitch Mix	4:01	
4.	"Freak On A Leash"	Josh A's Beast On A Leash Mix	4:19	
5.	"Freak On A Leash"	Lethal Freak Mix	3:39	

US single #2

#	Name	Notes	Time	Ref
1.	"Freak On A Leash"	Clean Single Edit	3:46	
2.	"Freak On A Leash"	Album Version	4:15	

UK single #2

#	Name	Notes	Time	Ref
Side A
1.	Freak On A Leash	Album Version	4:15	
2.	Freak On A Leash	Dante Ross Mix	4:45	
Side B
1.	Freak On A Leash	Freakin' Bitch Mix	3:59	
2.	Freak On A Leash	Josh A's Beast On A Leash Mix	4:16	
3.	Freak On A Leash	Lethal Freak Mix	3:3	

UK single #3

#	Name	Notes	Time	Ref
Side A
1.	"Freak On A Leash"	Dante Ross Mix	4:46	
2.	"Freak On A Leash"	Josh A's Beast On A Leash Mix	4:17	
Side A
3.	"Freak On A Leash"	Freakin' Bitch Mix	4:00	
4.	"Freak On A Leash"	Lethal Freak Mix	3:34	

UK single #4

#	Name	Notes	Time	Ref
1.	"Freak On A Leash"	Album Version	4:15	
2.	"Freak On A Leash"	Freakin' Bitch Mix	4:00	
3.	"Freak On A Leash"	Lethal Freak Mix	3:39	
4.	"Freak On A Leash"	Live - Family Values Tour Version	4:09	

Australian single #2

#	Name	Notes	Time	Ref
1.	"Freak On A Leash"	Clean Single Edit	3:46	
2.	"Freak On A Leash"	Album Version	4:17	
3.	"Freak On A Leash"	Freakin' Bitch Mix	4:01	
4.	"Freak On A Leash"	Josh A's Beast On A Leash Mix	4:18	
5.	"Freak On A Leash"	Lethal Freak Mix	3:43	
6.	"Freak On A Leash"	Dante Ross Mix	4:46	

== Charts ==
=== Weekly charts ===
Chart (1999)	Peak position
Australia (ARIA)	22
Canada Rock/Alternative (RPM)	25
Dominican Republic (Notimex)	4
Europe (Eurochart Hot 100)	55
Germany (GfK)	58
Iceland (Íslenski Listinn Topp 40)	15
Netherlands (Dutch Top 40)	22
Netherlands (Single Top 100)	23
New Zealand (Recorded Music NZ)	43
Scottish Singles Sales (Official Charts)	23
UK Singles (Official Charts)	24
UK Rock & Metal (Official Charts)	2
US Alternative Airplay (Billboard)	6
US Bubbling Under Hot 100 (Billboard)	6
US Mainstream Rock (Billboard)	10

=== Year-end charts ===
Chart (1999)	Position
Australia (ARIA)	66
Netherlands (Dutch Top 40)	130
US Mainstream Rock Tracks (Billboard)	21
US Modern Rock Tracks (Billboard)	18

=== MTV version feat. Amy Lee ===
Chart (2007)	Peak position
Czech Republic Rock (IFPI)	9
US Billboard Hot 100	89
US Alternative Airplay (Billboard)	29
US Mainstream Rock (Billboard)	22
US Pop 100 (Billboard)	73

== Certifications ==
Region	Certification	Certified units/sales
Australia (ARIA)	Gold	35,000^{^}
Japan (RIAJ)	Gold	50,000^{^}
New Zealand (RMNZ)	2× Platinum	60,000^{‡}
United Kingdom (BPI)	Platinum	600,000^{‡}
^{^} Shipments figures based on certification alone.^{‡} Sales+streaming figures based on certification alone.

== Bibliography ==
- Furman, Leah (May 5, 2000). Korn: Life in the Pit. St. Martin's Griffin. ISBN 0-312-25396-6.
