= Twisted Transistor =

Single by Korn

from the album See You on the Other Side
- Released: September 27, 2005
- Recorded: 2005
- Genre: Industrial metal
- Length: 4:12
- Label: Virgin
- Songwriters: Reginald Arvizu; Lauren Christy; Jonathan Davis; Graham Edwards; James Shaffer; David Silveria; Scott Spock
- Producers: The Matrix; Jonathan Davis

Korn singles chronology
| "Word Up!" (2004) | "Twisted Transistor" (2005) | "Coming Undone" (2006) |

"Twisted Transistor" is a song written and recorded by American nu metal band Korn for their seventh studio album, See You on the Other Side. It was released as the album's first single in September 2005.

== Release ==
The song has become Korn's second most successful single to date on the Billboard Hot 100, reaching number sixty-four, and became their highest charting single on Billboard's Mainstream Rock Songs chart, peaking at number three, until it was surpassed by "Never Never," which reached number one in 2013. Its success was continued overseas, where it charted in many countries, including number twenty-seven in the UK, number twenty-four in Australia, and number six in Finland.

== Music video ==
The video for the song was directed by Dave Meyers and features a Spinal Tap-esque mockumentary produced by "documentary filmmaker Rob Piner" (a reference to This Is Spinal Tap director Rob Reiner) where four rappers play the parts of Korn: Lil Jon as Jonathan Davis, Xzibit as Fieldy, David Banner as David Silveria, and Snoop Dogg as James Shaffer. The real Korn appears at the end of the video as representatives of "Fony Music", complaining about how the music video isn't going to sell because it lacks "bling-bling" and "booty shakin'". There is also a section in the video featuring 'Jonathan' recording vocals in "Big Rick's Studio", a reference to metal and hip-hop producer Rick Rubin, as Big Rick himself as he appears in the video bears a resemblance to Rick Rubin.

The rappers have jokingly noted in interviews that "It might be a [new] band coming towards you".

== Critical reception ==
AllMusic critic Johnny Loftus commented positively on the song: "It's Korn all the way, cocky and funky. But it's slick too, concerned more with the shock value of groove than trying to be some poor kid's slap bass confidant, his surrogate therapy session." IGN also praised it as a standout on the See You on the Other Side album: "The track burbles and grinds with turgid glee and warped sensibility." Virgin Media called the song "undoubtedly the strongest" track on the album, for "big hooks and catchy metal choruses".

In contrast, Don Kaye of Blabbermouth.net was more critical, describing the song as having "insipid lyrics about a girl putting a radio between her legs to literally get off on the music".

== Track listing ==
=== UK release ===
- 7" VUS316, CD VUSCD316
1. "Twisted Transistor" (radio edit)
2. "Too Late I'm Dead"

=== Australian release ===
- CD 3474592
1. "Twisted Transistor" (radio edit)
2. "Appears"
3. "Twisted Transistor" (Kupper's Elektro-tek radio edit)

=== US promotional release ===
- 12" VUSTDJ316
1. "Twisted Transistor" (Dummies Club Mix)
2. "Twisted Transistor" (album version)
3. "Twisted Transistor" (Kupper's Elektro-tek Klub Mix)
4. "Twisted Transistor" (Josh Harris Fuck the Club Mix)

== Charts ==
=== Weekly charts ===
Weekly chart performance for "Twisted Transistor"
| Chart (2005–2006) | Peak position |
|---|---|
| Australia (ARIA) | 24 |
| Austria (Ö3 Austria Top 40) | 37 |
| Finland (Suomen virallinen lista) | 6 |
| Germany (GfK) | 63 |
| German Alternative Singles Chart (Jahrescharts) | 5 |
| Iceland (Fréttablaðið Top 20) | 9 |
| Ireland (IRMA) | 24 |
| Italy (FIMI) | 14 |
| Latvian Airplay (LAIPA) | 20 |
| Netherlands (Dutch Top 40 Tipparade) | 2 |
| Netherlands (Single Top 100) | 27 |
| Quebec Airplay (ADISQ) | 42 |
| Scotland Singles (OCC) | 30 |
| Switzerland (Schweizer Hitparade) | 60 |
| UK Singles (OCC) | 27 |
| UK Rock & Metal (OCC) | 2 |
| US Billboard Hot 100 | 64 |
| US Alternative Airplay (Billboard) | 9 |
| US Dance Club Songs (Billboard) | 24 |
| US Mainstream Rock (Billboard) | 3 |
| US Pop 100 (Billboard) | 63 |

=== Year-end charts ===
2005 year-end chart performance for "Twisted Transistor"
| Chart (2005) | Position |
|---|---|
| US Modern Rock Tracks (Billboard) | 90 |

2006 year-end chart performance for "Twisted Transistor"
| Chart (2006) | Position |
|---|---|
| US Alternative Songs (Billboard) | 32 |
| US Mainstream Rock Songs (Billboard) | 20 |
