= Family Values Tour 1998 =

1998 concert tour by Korn

- Tour by Korn, Ice Cube, Limp Bizkit, Orgy, Rammstein, Incubus
- Associated album: Various
- Start date: September 22, 1998
- End date: October 31, 1998
- Legs: 1

The 1998 Family Values Tour was the first edition of the critically acclaimed fall music tour that initially combined nu metal, alternative metal, and rap acts. The tour was created and headlined by Korn.

== Promotion ==
The tour was preceded by whirlwind political campaign-style tour named "Korn Kampaign" (from August 17, 1998 in Los Angeles through September 1 in Phoenix) to promote the release of their album Follow the Leader. It took the group all over North America to spread the news of their "Family Values" platform to hordes of fans at special "fan conferences" that were organized at every stop along the tour route. Korn chartered a jet, which took them to record stores in such cities as Riverside, Mountain View, Sacramento, Seattle, Minneapolis, Chicago, Denver, Detroit, Philadelphia, Boston, New York City, Toronto, Atlanta, and Dallas. The band talked to fans at every stop, answered questions during the special "fan conferences" and signed autographs. Jim Rose hosted the entire "Kampaign" tour. Celebrities at various stops included Ice Cube and Todd McFarlane.

== Lineup ==
Artists who participated in 1998 Family Values Tour were:

- Korn
- Rammstein
- Ice Cube (until October 25, 1998)
- Incubus (October 25, 1998 onwards)
- Limp Bizkit
- Orgy

== Tour dates ==
Date	City	Country		Ref
September 22, 1998	Rochester	United States	Blue Cross Arena	
September 23, 1998	Worcester	United States	Worcester's Centrum Centre	
September 25, 1998	East Rutherford	United States	Continental Airlines Arena	
September 26, 1998	Philadelphia	United States	First Union Spectrum	
September 27, 1998	Cleveland	United States	CSU Convocation Center	
September 29, 1998	Pittsburgh	United States	Civic Arena	
September 30, 1998	Auburn Hills	United States	The Palace of Auburn Hills	
October 2, 1998	Milwaukee	United States	Wisconsin Center Arena	
October 3, 1998	Rosemont	United States	Rosemont Horizon	
October 4, 1998	Minneapolis	United States	Target Center	
October 6, 1998	Denver	United States	McNichols Sports Arena	
October 9, 1998	Inglewood	United States	Great Western Forum	
October 10, 1998	Daly City	United States	Cow Palace	
October 11, 1998	Paradise	United States	Thomas & Mack Center	
October 12, 1998	Phoenix	United States	America West Arena	
October 13, 1998	Nampa	United States	Idaho Center	
October 14, 1998	West Valley City	United States	E Center	
October 16, 1998	Fort Worth	United States	Fort Worth Convention Center	
October 17, 1998	Lafayette	United States	Cajundome	
October 18, 1998	New Orleans	United States	Lakefront Arena	
October 20, 1998	Oklahoma City	United States	Fairgrounds Arena	
October 22, 1998	Kansas City	United States	Kemper Arena	
October 23, 1998	St. Louis	United States	Kiel Center	
October 24, 1998	Omaha	United States	Omaha Civic Auditorium	
October 26, 1998	Kalamazoo	United States	Wings Stadium	
October 27, 1998	Indianapolis	United States	Market Square Arena	
October 29, 1998	New Haven	United States	New Haven Coliseum	
October 30, 1998	Uniondale	United States	Nassau Veterans Memorial Coliseum	
October 31, 1998	Fairfax	United States	Patriot Center	

== Ice Cube replacement ==
On October 26, 1998, due to the beginning of shooting the movie Next Friday, Ice Cube was replaced by alternative metal band Incubus for the remaining five dates. The band is featured on the Family Values Tour '98 CD release with their song "New Skin" and can be also seen during performance of "All in the Family" on the DVD. Ice Cube did not appear at the October 26, 1998, Wings Stadium (Kalamazoo, MI.) Incubus was present instead.

== Feud with Rob Zombie ==
Initially, Rob Zombie was to be one of the artists participating on the tour, but was dropped due to high production costs, each Rob Zombie concert costing $125,000 in band fees and show production alone. Therefore, Rob Zombie was replaced by German industrial metal act, Rammstein. However, the given explanation was somewhat confusing. The Firm, Korn's management, said Zombie continually expressed dissatisfaction over not wanting to work with a hip-hop act on the bill, and was supposedly lectured by Rob Zombie management that "rock kids don't like hip-hop." Rob Zombie's manager, Andy Gould said those comments were false. He explained that Zombie has never even spoken to Korn, so he could not have made those comments. Although the statement released by Korn's management resulted in anger, Rob Zombie shared no bad blood with the bands participating in Family Values Tour. Next year, in 1999, both Rob Zombie and Korn got on good terms again, and launched the highly successful "Rock is Dead" tour together.

== Trivia ==
In one of the more infamous moments, Rammstein's band members dressed up for Halloween. Most of them were practically naked with the exception of Richard Kruspe, who wore a wedding dress. Police dragged the members off the stage for indecent exposure and the concert ended after a mere 10 minutes.

== Success ==
The 1998 edition of Family Values Tour was highly successful, the live compilation debuted at #7 at Billboard 200 chart selling 121,000 copies in its first week, and achieving gold record status by RIAA, while DVD - platinum.

Korn helped to promote then-unknown acts. The results were very promising. Rammstein's album "Sehnsucht" achieved platinum certification in the United States, also Orgy's debut "Candyass", which was released through Korn's own record label, Elementree Records, achieved similar success. Limp Bizkit enjoyed even greater success which helped them establish themselves as one of the leading acts of the nu metal wave at that time, and enjoyed enormous commercial success.

The 28 dates of Family Values Tour grossed $6.5 million and over 243,000 fans purchased the fan-friendly ticket prices that ranged from $26.00 to $29.50.

Critical acclaim for the tour started to pour in as soon as it all started. As Jim Farber noted in a review of the September 25, 1998 event at the Continental Arena in New Jersey in the New York Daily News:

"[...] The 4 and half hour show, a hip-hop DJ held equal ground with a drummer in the set by Limp Bizkit, a keyboardist added dance club beats to the classic metal of Rammstein, and two guitarists translated the needling sound of electronic hip-hop into the manic creations of Korn [...] This tour created a bold new profile for hard guitar bands taking cues from the music that replaced them as the soundtrack to masculine aggression."

The Los Angeles Times noted that the tour "certainly proved to be one of the rock spectacles of the year," while Steve Morse of the Boston Globe said that "Korn delivered the goods...by accelerating out of the box with a savage confluence of heavy metal, rap, and primal screaming from singer Jonathan Davis."

John Scher of Metropolitan Entertainment agreed: "The Family Values Tour was not only a great business success, but more importantly, a rousing success with the fans. I think, to a great degree, we accomplished what we set out to: creating a fun, wild evening with a unique atmosphere and incredible music."

Jonathan Davis, lead singer of Korn said: "We're creating some rock history with this tour. From that first show, I had goosebumps upon goosebumps. This is something special happening here. I hope that it becomes annual and it's gonna last."

== Home media ==
The initial edition of Family Values Tour was highly successful and it was documented on separate DVD and CD releases, both put on sale on March 30, 1999 via Immortal/Epic Records. The CD release achieved gold record status in the United States while DVD release went platinum.

== Controversy ==
The Family Values Tour 1998 crossed the US, and the promotion of Follow the Leader continued in Japan and Australia. However, Korn cited being accustomed to the American way of life, food, and culture, and The Family Values Tour 1998 had not come to Europe; the band never came there to promote Follow the Leader. Their European fanbase, disappointed not to have seen them since 1997, would see their return in 2000 for a successful Issues Tour.
