= Unicorns N' Rainbows Tour =

2009 concert tour by Limp Bizkit

- Tour by Limp Bizkit
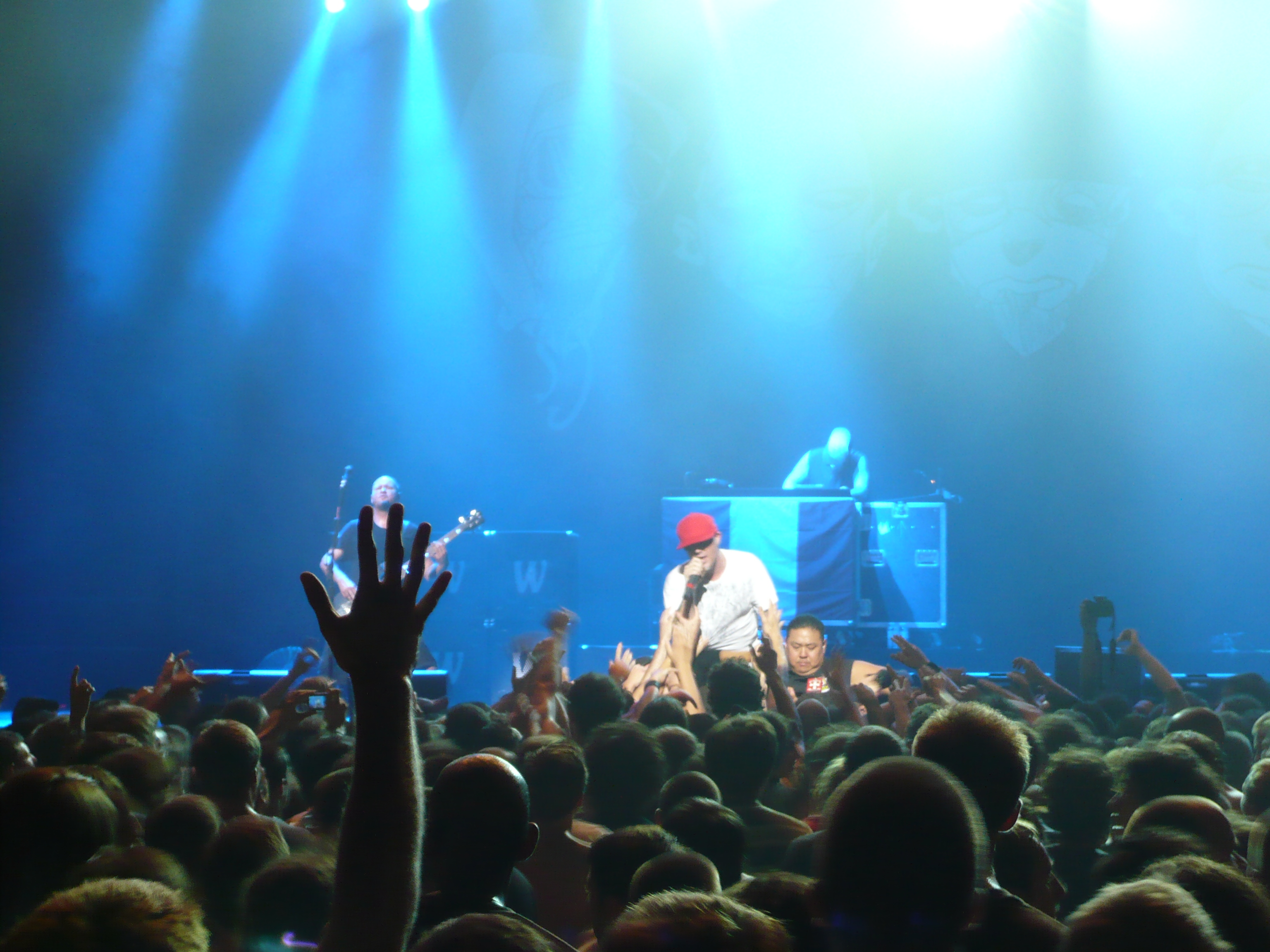
- Limp Bizkit during the Unicorns N' Rainbows Tour in Paris
- Location: Europe; Asia
- Start date: May 20, 2009
- End date: August 17, 2009
- Legs: 2
- No. of shows: 33; 27 in Europe; 6 in Asia

Limp Bizkit concert chronology
- Results May Vary Tour (2003–2004); Unicorns N' Rainbows Tour (2009); Gold Cobra Tour (2010–2011)

The Unicorns N' Rainbows Tour was a concert tour by American nu metal band Limp Bizkit.

It took place mostly in Europe, visiting countries they never visited before, and extended into a short Asian leg as well, as well as one-off special appearance in Las Vegas after a UFC 100 performance was cancelled. Two German dates on the tour, in Hamburg and Dortmund, were supported by rap rock act Hollywood Undead.

The tour marks the reunion of the band's original line-up (Fred Durst, Wes Borland, Sam Rivers, DJ Lethal and John Otto), as well as the release of a new album, the band's first since 2005's The Unquestionable Truth (Part 1). The new album, due to release sometime in 2010, will be followed by an additional promotional tour, this time in North America as well.

== Set list ==
Europe
- "Space Odyssey" (Intro)
- "My Generation"
- "Livin' It Up"
- "Show Me What You Got"
- "Eat You Alive"
- DJ Lethal Theme (All that Easy)
- "Hot Dog"
- "Re-Arranged"
- "Break Stuff"
- "The Truth" / "Pollution" (Varied between shows)
- "Boiler"
- "Just Like This"
- "Full Nelson"
- "My Way"
- "Faith" (George Michael cover)
- "Behind Blue Eyes" (The Who cover)

Encore

- "Nookie"
- "Take a Look Around"
- "Rollin' (Air Raid Vehicle)"
Asia
- "Space Odyssey" (Intro)
- "Hot Dog"
- "Livin' It Up"
- "Show Me What You Got"
- "My Generation"
- "Eat You Alive"
- "My Way"
- "Break Stuff"
- "Boiler"
- "Re-Arranged"
- "Pollution"
- "Get the Fuck Up"
- "Behind Blue Eyes" (The Who cover)
- "Nookie"
- "Faith" (George Michael cover)

Encore

- "Rollin' (Air Raid Vehicle)"
- "Full Nelson"
- "Take a Look Around"

== Tour dates ==
Date	City	Country	Venue
Europe
May 20, 2009	Riga	Latvia	Arena Riga
May 21, 2009	Vilnius	Lithuania	Siemens Arena
May 23, 2009	Tallinn	Estonia	Saku Suurhall
May 25, 2009	Helsinki	Finland	Kaapelitehdas
May 27, 2009	Saint Petersburg	Russia	Ice Palace
May 29, 2009	Moscow	Russia	Green Theatre
May 31, 2009	Kyiv	Ukraine	Palace of Sports
June 4, 2009	Neuchâtel	Switzerland	Festi'neuch
June 5, 2009	Nürnberg	Germany	Rock im Park
June 7, 2009	Nürburg	Germany	Rock am Ring
Support act: Hollywood Undead
June 9, 2009	Hamburg	Germany	Stadtpark Freilichtbühne
June 10, 2009	Dortmund	Germany	Westfalenhalle
June 12, 2009	Donington	England	Download Festival
Headlining dates
~~June 13, 2009~~	~~Istanbul~~	~~Turkey~~	~~Rapcore Fest~~
June 14, 2009	Milan	Italy	Rock In Idro
June 17, 2009	Berlin	Germany	Columbiahalle
June 18, 2009	Prague	Czech Republic	O2 Arena
June 20, 2009	Varaždin	Croatia	Varaždin Arena
June 21, 2009	Nickelsdorf	Austria	Nova Rock Festival
June 24, 2009	Szczecin	Poland	Szczecin Rock Festival
June 26, 2009	Nové Mesto nad Váhom	Slovakia	Topfest
June 28, 2009	Bucharest	Romania	Arenele Romane
June 29, 2009	Sofia	Bulgaria	Rock The Balkans
July 2, 2009	Sopron	Hungary	VOLT Festival
July 4, 2009	Werchter	Belgium	Rock Werchter Festival
July 5, 2009	Paris	France	Le Zénith
USA
July 18, 2009	Las Vegas	United States	The Pearl
Europe
August 1, 2009	London	England	The Forum
August 2, 2009	Knebworth	England	Sonisphere Festival
Asia
August 7, 2009	Osaka	Japan	Summer Sonic Festival
August 9, 2009	Chiba	Japan	Summer Sonic Festival
August 11, 2009	Tokyo	Japan	JCB Hall
August 13, 2009	Osaka	Japan	Zepp
August 15, 2009	Seoul	South Korea	ETPFEST
August 17, 2009	Seoul	South Korea	Olympic Hall
