= Gold Cobra Tour =

2010–11 concert tour by Limp Bizkit

- Tour by Limp Bizkit
- 2011 European Tour
- Location: North America; Europe
- Associated album: Gold Cobra
- Start date: April 24, 2010
- End date: September 24, 2011
- Legs: 3
- No. of shows: 56 (39 cancelled); 43 in Europe; 6 in North America (28 cancelled); 7 in Latin America (11 cancelled)

Limp Bizkit concert chronology
- Unicorns N' Rainbows Tour (2009); Gold Cobra Tour (2010–2011)

The Gold Cobra Tour was a tour by American nu metal band Limp Bizkit, taking place in support of their album Gold Cobra, beginning in 2010. It was the band's first promotional tour for the new album after their original line-up reunion tour in 2009, and their first North American tour since the Results May Vary Tour in 2004.

The tour started with a few warm-up North American festival dates in May 2010, with a full North American leg soon following in July, though this North American leg was soon cancelled due to the band's dislike of theatres and was never rescheduled for in-door venues like promised by the band. The band went on a European leg instead, between August–October 2010.

The band announced a Latin American tour for October–November 2010, though this tour was soon cancelled following Fred Durst hurting his neck. The band resumed the tour in 2011, announcing more European dates for summer 2011, beginning on June 24, 2011, at the Sonisphere Festival in Basel, Switzerland, to coincide with the album's release on June 28, 2011. The European leg, which consists mostly of festival appearances, is the band's first in support of Gold Cobra since its long delayed release in June 2011.

On July 21, 2011, the band is set to start the first Latin American leg in support of Gold Cobra, a rescheduled leg to make-up for the cancelled October–November 2010 tour, though the new tour includes only 7 dates while the original tour was set to include 11 dates. Dates in Ecuador, Venezuela, Colombia and Costa Rica were not rescheduled. In September 2011, a Japan leg was announced. Limp Bizkit would tour Japan on October 14, 15 and 17. The band played at Epicenter 2011 in California in September 2011.

== Setlist ==
Europe 2010
- "Pure Imagination" (intro)
- "Why Try"
- "Show Me What You Got" / "9 Teen 90 Nine" (Varied between shows)
- "My Generation"
- "Livin' It Up"
- "Counterfeit" (Not played on every date)
- "Eat You Alive"
- "My Way"
- "Hot Dog" / "Trust?" (Varied between shows)
- "It'll Be OK"
- "Behind Blue Eyes" (The Who cover)
- "Break Stuff"
- "Nookie"
- "Re-Arranged" / "I'm Broke" (Varied between shows)
- "Rollin' (Air Raid Vehicle)"

Encore

- "Boiler"
- "Take a Look Around"
- "Yellow" (Coldplay cover) (Played on first few dates only)
- "Faith" (George Michael cover)
Europe 2011
- "Introbra"
- "Hot Dog"
- "Gold Cobra"
- "Shotgun"
- "Douche Bag" / "Get a Life" (Varied between shows)
- "Bring It Back"
- "Why Try"
- "My Generation"
- "Livin' It Up"
- "My Way"
- "Break Stuff"
- "Boiler"
- "Almost Over" (Not played on every date)
- "Take a Look Around"
- "Nookie"
- "Walking Away"
- "Full Nelson"

Encore

- "Behind Blue Eyes" (The Who cover)
- "Faith" (George Michael cover)
- "Rollin' (Air Raid Vehicle)"

== Tour dates ==
Date	City	Country	Venue
Warm-up dates
April 24, 2010	Tampa	United States	98RockFest
April 30, 2010	Memphis	United States	Beale Street Music Festival
May 1, 2010	Frisco	United States	Edgefest
May 2, 2010	Houston	United States	Buzzfest
May 5, 2010	New York City	United States	Blender Theater at Gramercy
May 23, 2010	Columbus	United States	Rock on the Range
North America, Leg #1
~~July 3, 2010~~	~~Holmdel~~	~~United States~~	~~PNC Bank Arts Center~~
~~July 5, 2010~~	~~Cleveland~~	~~United States~~	~~Time Warner Cable Amphitheater~~
~~July 7, 2010~~	~~Cincinnati~~	~~United States~~	~~PNC Pavilion at Riverbend~~
~~July 8, 2010~~	~~Charlotte~~	~~United States~~	~~Verizon Wireless Amphitheatre~~
July 10, 2010	Biloxi	~~United States~~	Mississippi Coast Coliseum
~~July 11, 2010~~	~~Atlanta~~	~~United States~~	~~Lakewood Amphitheatre~~
~~July 13, 2010~~	~~Bristow~~	~~United States~~	~~Jiffy Lube Live~~
~~July 15, 2010~~	~~Tinley Park~~	~~United States~~	~~First Midwest Bank Amphitheatre~~
~~July 17, 2010~~	~~Noblesville~~	~~United States~~	~~Verizon Wireless Music Center~~
July 18, 2010	Cadott	~~United States~~	Rock Fest
~~July 20, 2010~~	~~Pittsburgh~~	~~United States~~	~~Post-Gazette Pavilion~~
~~July 21, 2010~~	~~Toronto~~	~~Canada~~	~~Molson Amphitheatre~~
~~July 23, 2010~~	~~Clarkston~~	~~United States~~	~~DTE Energy Music Theatre~~
~~July 24, 2010~~	~~Corfu~~	~~United States~~	~~Darien Lake Performing Arts Center~~
~~July 25, 2010~~	~~Mansfield~~	~~United States~~	~~Comcast Center~~
~~July 27, 2010~~	~~Camden~~	~~United States~~	~~Susquehanna Bank Center~~
~~July 28, 2010~~	~~Virginia Beach~~	~~United States~~	~~Verizon Wireless Amphitheatre~~
July 30, 2010	Wallingford	~~United States~~	Oakdale Theatre
July 31, 2010	Syracuse	~~United States~~	K-Rockathon
~~August 1, 2010~~	~~Atlantic City~~	~~United States~~	~~Trump Taj Mahal~~
~~August 2, 2010~~	~~Maryland Heights~~	~~United States~~	~~Verizon Wireless Amphitheater~~
~~August 5, 2010~~	~~Greenwood Village~~	~~United States~~	~~Fiddler's Green Amphitheatre~~
~~August 7, 2010~~	~~Phoenix~~	~~United States~~	~~Cricket Wireless Pavilion~~
~~August 8, 2010~~	~~Chula Vista~~	~~United States~~	~~Cricket Wireless Amphitheatre~~
~~August 10, 2010~~	~~Albuquerque~~	~~United States~~	~~Journal Pavilion~~
~~August 12, 2010~~	~~Irvine~~	~~United States~~	~~Verizon Wireless Amphitheatre~~
~~August 13, 2010~~	~~Wheatland~~	~~United States~~	~~Sleep Train Amphitheatre~~
~~August 15, 2010~~	~~Auburn~~	~~United States~~	~~White River Amphitheatre~~
Europe, Leg #1
August 18, 2010	Eindhoven	Netherlands	Effenaar
August 20, 2010	Hasselt	Belgium	Pukkelpop
August 21, 2010	Gampel	Switzerland	Gampel Open Air Festival
August 24, 2010	Dublin	Ireland	Olympia Theatre
August 26, 2010	Glasgow	Scotland	O_{2} Academy Glasgow
August 28, 2010	Leeds	England	Leeds Festival
August 29, 2010	Reading	England	Reading Festival
August 31, 2010	Frankfurt	Germany	Jahrhunderthalle
September 2, 2010	Vienna	Austria	Two Days a Week Festival
September 3, 2010	Stuttgart	Germany	Porsche Arena
September 5, 2010	Düsseldorf	Germany	Philipshalle
September 6, 2010	Amsterdam	Netherlands	Heineken Music Hall
September 8, 2010	Paris	France	L'Olympia
September 9, 2010	Villeurbanne	France	Le Transbordeur
September 11, 2010	Bilbao	Spain	Santana 27
September 12, 2010	Madrid	Spain	La Riviera
September 14, 2010	Lisbon	Portugal	Pavilhão Atlântico
September 16, 2010	Barcelona	Spain	Razzmatazz
September 18, 2010	Milan	Italy	PalaSharp
September 20, 2010	Munich	Germany	Zenith
September 21, 2010	Leipzig	Germany	Haus Auensee
September 23, 2010	Berlin	Germany	Columbiahalle
September 24, 2010	Hamburg	Germany	Sportshalle
September 26, 2010	Copenhagen	Denmark	K.B. Hallen
~~September 27, 2010~~	~~Oslo~~	~~Norway~~	~~Oslo Spektrum~~
October 1, 2010	Saint Petersburg	Russia	Ice Palace
October 3, 2010	Moscow	Russia	Olympic Stadium
October 5, 2010	Minsk	Belarus	Minsk Sports Palace
October 7, 2010	Kyiv	Ukraine	Kyiv Expo Plaza
October 9, 2010	Warsaw	Poland	Stodola
Latin America, Leg #1
~~October 14, 2010~~	~~San José~~	~~Costa Rica~~	~~Autódromo La Guacima~~
~~October 16, 2010~~	~~Panama City~~	~~Panama~~	~~Figali Convention Center~~
~~October 19, 2010~~	~~Bogotá~~	~~Colombia~~	~~Coliseo Cubierto El Campín~~
~~October 22, 2010~~	~~São Paulo~~	~~Brazil~~	~~Via Funchal~~
~~October 24, 2010~~	~~Belo Horizonte~~	~~Brazil~~	~~Chevrolet Hall~~
~~October 26, 2010~~	~~Buenos Aires~~	~~Argentina~~	~~Luna Park~~
~~October 28, 2010~~	~~Santiago~~	~~Chile~~	~~Teatro Caupolican~~
~~October 30, 2010~~	~~Asunción~~	~~Paraguay~~	~~Jockey Club~~
~~November 2, 2010~~	~~Lima~~	~~Peru~~	~~Estadio Monumental "U"~~
~~November 4, 2010~~	~~Quito~~	~~Ecuador~~	~~Coliseo General Rumiñahui~~
~~November 6, 2010~~	~~Caracas~~	~~Venezuela~~	~~Terraza del C.C.C.T.~~
Europe, Leg #2
June 24, 2011	Basel	Switzerland	Sonisphere Festival
June 25, 2011	Mannheim	Germany	SAP Arena
June 27, 2011	Oberhausen	Germany	König Pilsener Arena
June 28, 2011	Munich	Germany	Tollwood Sommerfestival
July 1, 2011	Arras	France	Main Square Festival
July 2, 2011	Sulingen	Germany	Reload Festival
July 4, 2011	Leipzig	Germany	Haus Auensee
July 5, 2011	Vienna	Austria	Gasometer
July 7, 2011	Amsterdam	Netherlands	Heineken Music Hall
July 8, 2011	Liège	Belgium	Les Ardentes
July 10, 2011	Knebworth	England	Sonisphere Festival
July 12, 2011	Codroipo	Italy	Villa Manin
July 16, 2011	Istanbul	Turkey	Rock'n Coke
Latin America, Leg #1 (Rescheduled)
July 21, 2011	Santiago	Chile	Movistar Arena
July 23, 2011	Rio de Janeiro	Brazil	Fundição Progresso
July 26, 2011	São Paulo	Brazil	Via Funchal
July 29, 2011	Asunción	Paraguay	Jockey Club
August 1, 2011	Buenos Aires	Argentina	Microestadio Malvinas Argentinas
August 3, 2011	Lima	Peru	Estadio Monumental "U"
August 6, 2011	Panama City	Panama	Figali Convention Center
Epicenter Festival
September 24, 2011	Irvine	United States	Verizon Wireless Amphitheater

== Support acts ==
- Antenna (October 7, 2010)
- Dope D.O.D. (June 24–July 7, 2011)
- Kaizen (October 3, 2010)
- 2X (July 21, 2011)
- La Raza (July 26, 2011)
- Nofacez (October 7, 2010)
- Buckcherry (July 10, 2010)

- Psyko Dalek (August 24–26, 2010; June 24–July 7, 2011)
- The Blackout (September 5–27, 2010)
- Tihuana (October 22–24, 2010)
- ...Por Hablar (August 3, 2011)
- Twin Atlantic (August 26, 2010)
- Slot_(band) (October 3, 2010)
- Aaron Lewis/Staind (2010)
