= The Family Values Tour 1999 =

Live album by Various Artists
- Released: May 23, 2000
- Recorded: September–October 1999
- Genre: Nu metal, alternative metal, heavy metal, hip hop, alternative rock, big beat
- Length: 71:07
- Label: Interscope
- Producer: Jeff Kwatinetz, Bill Sheppell

Various Artists chronology
Family Values Tour '98 (1999)	The Family Values Tour 1999 (2000)	The Family Values Tour 2001 (2002)

Professional ratings
Review scores
Source	Rating
AllMusic	3/5 stars
Kerrang!	3/5 stars
Metal Hammer	8/10

The Family Values Tour 1999 is the second live album that features select live performances from the 1999 Family Values Tour, and it was released on May 23, 2000, through Interscope Records. The album is produced by Jeff Kwatinetz and Bill Sheppell.

== History ==
Ja Rule, Run DMC, Mobb Deep also appeared on the Tour (in place of DMX, who canceled prior to the beginning of the tour). Korn made surprise appearances at a handful of dates having Limp Bizkit be the headliner of their tour this year. Sevendust filled in for Filter on the Denver date while Filter took time off to film the video for "Take A Picture". System of a Down were originally on the line-up but canceled their appearance due to a feud with Limp Bizkit. The Minneapolis date was the only that featured both Primus and Korn.

== Track listing ==
No.	Title	Writer(s)	Performer(s)	Length
1.	"Break Stuff"	Wes Borland, Fred Durst, John Otto, Sam Rivers	Limp Bizkit	4:00
2.	"Lacquer Head"	Les Claypool, Primus	Primus	4:54
3.	"Mudshovel"	Johnny April, Aaron Lewis, Mike Mushok, Jon Wysocki	Staind	4:47
4.	"Falling Away from Me"	Reggie Arvizu, Jonathan Davis, James Shaffer, David Silveria, Brian Welch	Korn	4:34
5.	"Da Rockwilder"	Reggie Noble, Dana Stinson	Method Man & Redman	2:30
6.	"Hey Man, Nice Shot"	Richard Patrick	Filter	7:17
7.	"Re-Arranged"	W. Borland, F. Durst, J. Otto, S. Rivers	Limp Bizkit	5:01
8.	"A.D.I.D.A.S./Good God"	J. Davis, J. Shaffer, D. Silveria, B. Welch	Korn	6:13
9.	"My Name Is Mud"	L. Claypool, Primus	Primus	5:44
10.	"Welcome to the Fold"	R. Patrick	Filter	5:08
11.	"Keep Hope Alive"	Ken Jordan, Scott Kirkland	The Crystal Method	6:29
12.	"I Would for You" (Jane's Addiction cover)	Perry Farrell	Limp Bizkit	4:35
13.	"Nookie"	W. Borland, F. Durst, J. Otto, S. Rivers	Limp Bizkit	6:54
14.	"Outside"	A. Lewis	Aaron Lewis & Fred Durst	5:41
Total length:				71:07

== Dates ==
- 09/21 - Pittsburgh, PA at Civic Arena
- 09/28 - Worcester, MA at Worcester Centrum
- 10/2 - Uniondale, NY at Nassau Coliseum
- 10/3 - Philadelphia, PA at First Union Center
- 10/5 - Grand Rapids, MI at Van Andel Arena
- 10/6 - Indianapolis, IN at Market Square Arena
- 10/8 - Columbus, OH at Schottenstein Center
- 10/9 - Rosemont, IL at Allstate Arena
- 10/10 - St. Louis, MO at Kiel Center
- 10/12 - Kansas City, MO at Kemper Arena
- 10/13 - Minneapolis, MN at Target Center
- 10/16 - Portland, OR at Rose Garden Arena
- 10/17 - Tacoma, WA at Tacoma Dome
- 10/19 - San Francisco, CA at Cow Palace
- 10/20 - Sacramento, CA at ARCO Arena
- 10/22 - Phoenix, AZ at America West Arena
- 10/23 - Anaheim, CA at Arrowhead Pond
- 10/25 - Denver, CO at Pepsi Center
- 10/27 - Dallas, TX at Reunion Arena
- 10/28 - Houston, TX at Compaq Center
- 10/30 - San Antonio, TX at Alamodome
- 10/31 - Biloxi, MS at Mississippi Coast Coliseum

== Charts ==
=== Weekly charts ===
Chart (2000)	Peak position
US Billboard 200	32

=== Year-end charts ===
Chart (2001)	Position
US Billboard 200	172
