= Family Values Tour '98 =

Family Values Tour '98 may refer to these live recordings:

- Family Values Tour '98 (album)
- Family Values Tour '98 (video)

== See also ==
- Family Values Tour 1998, the music tour
