= Death of Jessica Michalik =

2001 crowd crush incident

Jessica Michalik
- Born: Jessica Anna Michalik; 7 January 1985; Manly, New South Wales, Australia
- Died: 31 January 2001 (aged 16); Concord, New South Wales, Australia
- Education: Cromer High School
- Occupation: Student (Eleventh grade)
- Parent(s): George and Barbara

Jessica Anna Michalik (7 January 1985 – 31 January 2001) was an Australian girl from Sydney, born to Polish immigrants, who died as a result of asphyxiation five days after being crushed in a mosh pit during the 2001 Big Day Out music festival during a performance by headlining act Limp Bizkit.

== Incident ==
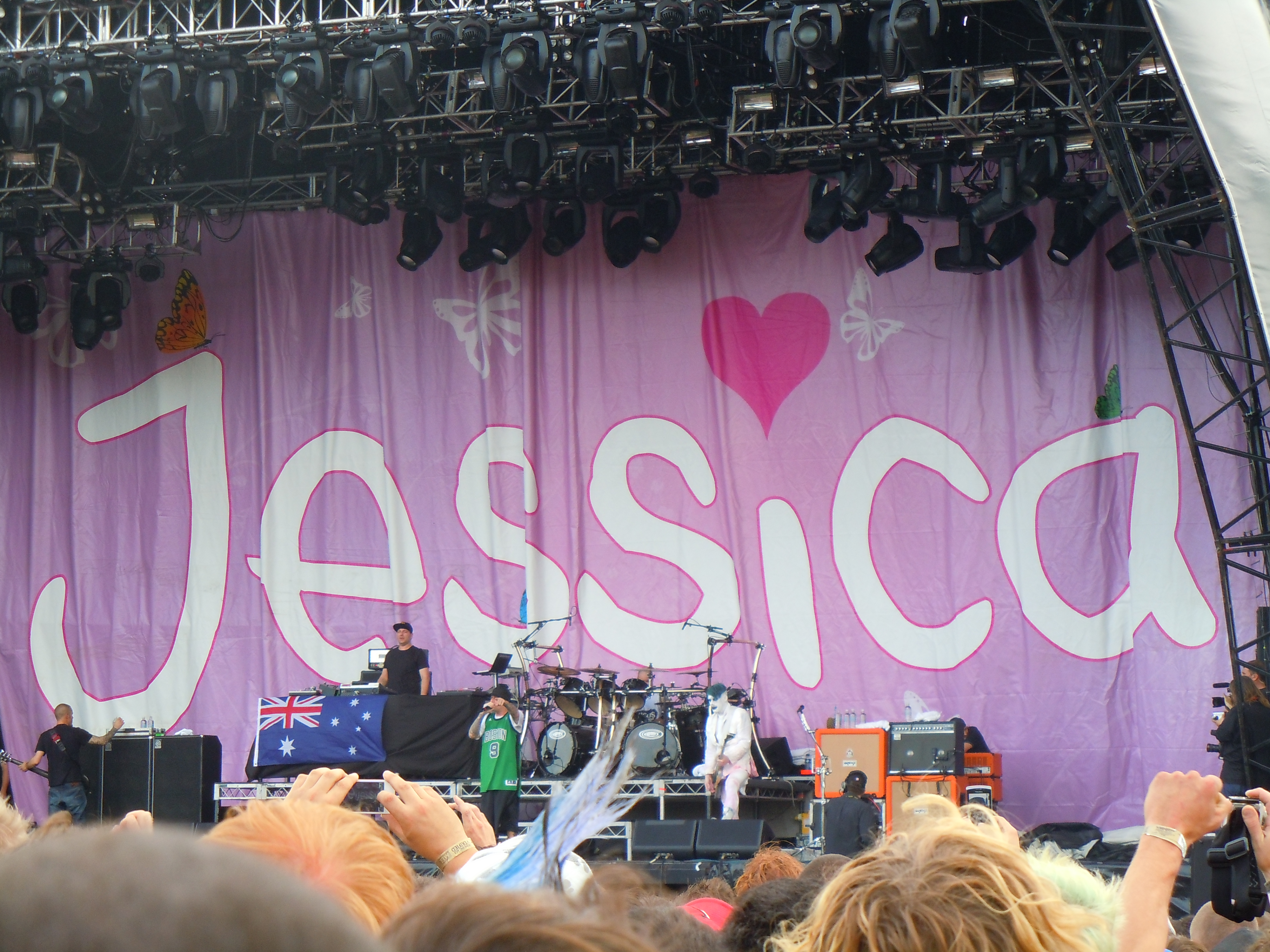
Limp Bizkit's tribute to Jessica Michalik during the 2012 Soundwave festival

Prior to Limp Bizkit's set, the band At the Drive-In had taken exception to the vigorous moshing during their performance earlier that day. Their lead singer Cedric Bixler-Zavala addressed the crowd at the conclusion of their song "Cosmonaut", saying "I think it's a very very sad day when the only way you can express yourself is through slamdancing". Then after pointing at an audience member crowd surfing, he continued "look at that... you didn't learn that from your best friend! You learned that from the TV!", and finally told the crowd "You're a robot, you're a sheep" before bleating at them several times and leaving the stage around 10 minutes into their set.

Reviewing Limp Bizkit's performance at the Big Day Out for Metal Hammer, Mark Hughes stated that "a horrifying looking [crowd] crush" occurred at the front of the stage when the band began playing "My Generation". The band were then cut short by medical personnel and security staff as they attempted to play "Re-Arranged". Durst reportedly encouraged the crowd "to settle down", and after a 15 minute break, the band resumed their performance with the songs "Take A Look Around" and "Break Stuff". After another intermission "to settle the rabid punters", during which the crowd was hosed with water by staff, Limp Bizkit performed the final song of their set, "Nookie".

The Coroner's Court of New South Wales findings into her death criticized the crowd control measures in use at the time, as well as Limp Bizkit lead singer Fred Durst for his "alarming and inflammatory" comments during the rescue effort.

Michalik’s favourite band, Grinspoon, performed at her funeral and wrote "Chemical Heart" as a tribute to Michalik. A "minute of noise" tribute had been observed at subsequent Big Day Out festivals. Limp Bizkit paid tribute to Michalik during their Soundwave 2012 performances, which included performing under a banner with Jessica's name on it during the Brisbane and Melbourne legs.
