= Family Values Tour '98 (video) =

Video by Various Artists
- Released: March 30, 1999
- Recorded: October 18, 1998 (Uno Lakefront Arena, New Orleans, LA); October 31, 1998 (Patriot Center, Fairfax, Virginia)
- Genres: Nu metal, alternative metal, rap, Industrial metal
- Length: 86:00
- Labels: Immortal, Epic
- Director: Joe Friday
- Producer: Allan Newman

Family Values Tour '98 is a live DVD by various artists, which was released on March 30, 1999, through Immortal Records and Epic Records. It was released on the same date as the CD version.

== Lineup ==
Artists who participated in 1998 Family Values Tour were the following bands and musicians:

- Korn
- Ice Cube
- Incubus (replaced Ice Cube on October 25, 1998, for four remaining dates)
- Limp Bizkit
- Orgy
- Rammstein

== Promotion ==
The tour was preceded by whirlwind political campaign-style tour named "Korn Kampaign" (from August 17, 1998, in Los Angeles through September 1 in Phoenix) to promote the release of their album Follow the Leader. It took the group all over North America to spread the news of their "Family Values" platform to hordes of fans at special "fan conferences" that were organized at every stop along the tour route. Korn chartered a jet, which took them to record stores in such cities as Riverside, CA, Mt. View, CA, Sacramento, Seattle, Minneapolis, Chicago, Detroit, Philadelphia, Boston, New York City, Toronto, Atlanta, and Dallas. The band talked to fans at every stop, answered questions during the special "fan conferences" and signed autographs. Jim Rose hosted the entire "Korn Kampaign" tour. Celebrities at various stops included Ice Cube and Todd McFarlane.

== Success ==
The 1998 edition of the Family Values Tour was highly successful. The DVD sold over 1,100,000 copies and achieved platinum record status according to the RIAA.

Korn helped to promote then-unknown acts. The results were very promising. Rammstein's album Sehnsucht achieved platinum certification in the United States, also Orgy's debut Candyass achieved similar success. Limp Bizkit enjoyed even greater success which helped them establish themselves as one of the leading acts of the nu metal wave at that time, and enjoyed enormous commercial success.

== Track listing ==
The DVD release does not feature any of Incubus' songs, unlike the CD release.

1. "Cambodia" - Limp Bizkit
2. "Counterfeit" - Limp Bizkit
3. "Faith" - Limp Bizkit
4. "Jump Around" - Limp Bizkit
5. "Check Yo Self" - Ice Cube
6. "Fuck Dying" - Ice Cube
7. "It Was a Good Day" - Ice Cube
8. "Fuck Tha Police" - Ice Cube
9. "Blue Monday" - Orgy
10. "Stitches" - Orgy
11. "Revival" - Orgy (feat. Jonathan Davis)
12. "Bück dich" - Rammstein
13. "Du hast" - Rammstein
14. "Blind" - Korn
15. "All in the Family - Korn (feat. Limp Bizkit)
16. "Got the Life" - Korn
17. "A.D.I.D.A.S." - Korn
18. "Children of the Korn / "Wicked" - Korn (feat. Ice Cube)
19. "Faget" - Korn

== Trivia ==
- In one of the more infamous moments, Rammstein's band members dressed up for Halloween. Most of them were practically naked with the exception of Richard Kruspe, who wore a wedding dress. Police dragged the members off the stage for indecent exposure and the concert ended after a mere 10 minutes.
