= Behind the Player: Fieldy =

Behind The Player: Fieldy

Video by Fieldy
- Released: November 1, 2008
- Length: 72:00
- Label: IMV
- Director: Leon Melas
- Producer: Ken Mayer & Sean E DeMott

Behind The Player: Fieldy is an interactive music video featuring Korn bassist Fieldy. Released on November 1, 2008 by IMV, the DVD features Fieldy giving in-depth bass lessons for how to play "Got The Life" and "Freak on a Leash" by Korn and an intimate behind-the scenes look at his life as a professional musician, including rare photos and video. The DVD also includes Fieldy jamming the two tracks with Jane's Addiction drummer Stephen Perkins, VideoTab that shows exactly how Fieldy plays his parts in the two songs, as well as other bonus material.

IMV donates $.25 from the sale of each Behind the Player DVD to Little Kids Rock, an organization that gets instruments in the hands of underprivileged kids.

== Contents ==
Behind The Player

Fieldy talks about his background, influences and gear, including rare photos and video

"Got The Life" by Korn

- Lesson: Fieldy gives an in-depth bass lesson for how to play the song
- Jam: Fieldy jams the track with Jane's Addiction drummer Stephen Perkins
- VideoTab: Animated tablature shows exactly how Fieldy plays the track

"Freak on a Leash" by Korn

- Lesson: Fieldy gives an in-depth bass lesson for how to play the song
- Jam: Fieldy jams the track with Jane's Addiction drummer Stephen Perkins
- VideoTab: Animated tablature shows exactly how Fieldy plays the track

Special features

- Immanuel 123 promo video
- Stillwell promo video
- Photo Album
- Little Kids Rock promotional video

== Personnel ==
- Produced By: Ken Mayer & Sean E Demott
- Directed By: Leon Melas
- Executive Producer: Rick Donaleshen
- Associate Producer: Jamie Tiessere
- Director Of Photography: Paulo Cascio
- Sound Engineer: Matt Chidgey
- Edited By: Jeff Morose
- Mixed By: Matt Chidgey & Cedrick Courtois
- Graphics By: Thayer DeMay
- Transcription By: Thayer DeMay
- Camera Operators: Brian Silva, Joe Hendrick, Doug Cragoe, Nate Lipp
- Technical Directors: Tyler Bourns & Chris Golde
- Gaffer: John Parker
- Assistant Director: Matt Pick
- Lighting And Grip: Mcnulty Nielson
- Key Grip: Jaletta Kalman
- Artist Hospitality: Sasha Mayer
- Shot At: Third Encore
- Special Guest: Stephen Perkins
- Cover Photo By: Stephanie Pick
- Video Courtesy Of: Sébastien Paquet, Danny “Hamcam” Hamilton
- Photos Courtesy Of: Sébastien Paquet, Dina Arvizu, Marty Temme, Jacki Sallow, Tony Florez
- Photo Library Complements Of: Ultimaterockpix.Com
