= N 2 Gether Now =

1999 single by Limp Bizkit

Single by Limp Bizkit featuring Method Man

from the album Significant Other
- Released: November 9, 1999
- Recorded: 1999
- Genre: Hip-hop; rap rock
- Length: 3:55
- Label: Interscope
- Composer: Chris Martin
- Lyricists: Clifford Smith; Fred Durst
- Producer: DJ Premier

Limp Bizkit singles chronology
"Re-Arranged" (1999)	"N 2 Gether Now" (1999)	"Break Stuff" (2000)

Method Man singles chronology
"Da Rockwilder" (1999)	"N 2 Gether Now" (1999)	"Y.O.U." (2000)

Music video
- "N 2 Gether Now" on YouTube

"N 2 Gether Now" is a hip-hop song by the American band Limp Bizkit and rapper Method Man. It was the third single released from their second studio album, Significant Other. The single was released with their last single "Break Stuff". The song does not include the instrumentalist members Sam Rivers and Wes Borland.

== Background ==
Method Man had heard about Limp Bizkit and wanted to record with them because he had never worked with a rock band. The band allowed Fred Durst and DJ Lethal to explore their hip-hop origins by recording a song with the rapper. DJ Premier of Gang Starr produced the song even though he was hesitant to do so at first. According to Borland, the band wanted to record "a track that was straight hip-hop".

The beginnings of the backing beat started with a demo that DJ Lethal created. Patrick Moxey, who was managing DJ Premier at the time, was contacted by Limp Bizkit, who were interested in having Premier update the existing beat. Premier had previously been aware of Limp Bizkit through their cover of "Faith" by George Michael and DJ Lethal's previous work in House of Pain, which led to him eventually agreeing to work with the band, but not without declining first.

DJ Premier had hesitations around lead singer Fred Durst's rapping ability, believing it to not be at the same level as previous artists Premier had worked with. Because of this, Premier initially rejected the offer to work on the track.

"To me Fred [Durst] was dope with what they did. But when it came to the emceeing aspect of what I was used to, I was very, very hesitant to do it. I was like, 'yo man, I'm just not feeling the way he raps'".

After a face-to-face meeting with Durst and learning that Method Man would be featured on the track, Premier became more interested. Durst impressed Premier by offering to work closely with him in order to improve his performance, and revealing he owned the entire DJ Premier Tape Kingz mixtape collection.

Premier's biggest contributions to the track ended up being a re-recording of Durst's vocals, a complete change of the drum sounds and bass line, and the addition of samples recorded by Durst that he provided on a 10" dubplate.

== Track listing ==
1. "Break Stuff" (album version)
2. "Crushed" (album version)
3. "N 2 Gether Now" (album version)

== Charts ==
Chart (1999–2000)	Peak position
US Billboard Hot 100	73
US Hot R&B/Hip-Hop Songs (Billboard)	53
US R&B/Hip-Hop Airplay (Billboard)	43
