= Family Values Tour '98 (album) =

1999 live album by various artists

Live album by Various Artists
- Released: March 30, 1999
- Recorded: October 18, 1998 (Uno Lakefront Arena, New Orleans); October 31, 1998 Patriot Center, Fairfax, Virginia)
- Genres: Nu metal; alternative metal; hip hop; rap metal; funk metal; industrial rock; electronic rock; Neue Deutsche Härte
- Length: 71:09
- Label: Immortal/Epic
- Producers: Josh Abraham, Jeff Kwatinetz

Various Artists chronology
Family Values Tour '98 (1999)	The Family Values Tour 1999 (2000)

Professional ratings
Review scores
Source	Rating
Allmusic	link

Family Values Tour '98 is a live album released on March 30, 1999, through Immortal and Epic Records. It was published on the same day as the DVD version. The live album was produced by Josh Abraham and Jeff Kwatinetz.

== Lineup ==
Artists who participated in 1998 Family Values Tour were the following bands and musicians:

- Korn
- Ice Cube
- Incubus (replaced Ice Cube on October 25, 1998, for five remaining dates)
- Limp Bizkit
- Orgy
- Rammstein

== Promotion ==
The tour was preceded by whirlwind political campaign-style tour named "Korn Kampaign" (from August 17, 1998, in Los Angeles through September 1 in Phoenix, Arizona) to promote the release of their album Follow the Leader. It took the group all over North America to spread the news of their "Family Values" platform to hordes of fans at special "fan conferences" that were organized at every stop along the tour route. Korn chartered a jet, which took them to record stores in such cities as Riverside, CA, Mt. View, CA, Sacramento, Seattle, Minneapolis, Chicago, Detroit, Philadelphia, Boston, New York City, Toronto, Atlanta, and Dallas. The band talked to fans at every stop, answered questions during the special "fan conferences" and signed autographs. Jim Rose hosted the entire "Korn Kampaign" tour. Celebrities at various stops included Ice Cube and Todd McFarlane.

== Reception ==
The 1998 edition of Family Values Tour was highly successful, the live compilation debuted at #7 at Billboard 200 chart selling 121,000 copies in its first week, and achieving gold record status by RIAA.

Korn helped to promote then-unknown acts. The results were very promising. Rammstein's album Sehnsucht achieved platinum certification in the United States, also Orgy's debut album Candyass achieved similar success. Limp Bizkit enjoyed even greater success which helped them establish themselves as one of the leading acts of the nu metal wave at that time, and enjoyed enormous commercial success.

== Track listing ==
No.	Title	Performer(s)	Length
1.	"Intro"	C-Minus	0:57
2.	"New Skin (Live Version At Patriot Center, Fairfax, Virginia, U.S., 10.31.1998)"	Incubus	4:26
3.	"Interlude #1"	C-Minus	0:54
4.	"Dissension (Live Version At Patriot Center, Fairfax, Virginia, U.S., 10.31.1998)"	Orgy	3:48
5.	"Gender (Live Version At Version Patriot Center, Fairfax, Virginia, U.S., 10.31.1998)"	Orgy	4:31
6.	"Blue Monday (Live Version At UNO Lakefront Arena, New Orleans, U.S., 10.18.1998)" (New Order cover)	Orgy	4:07
7.	"Interlude #2"	C-Minus	0:51
8.	"Cambodia (Live Version At UNO Lakefront Arena, New Orleans, U.S., 10.18.1998)"	Limp Bizkit	4:31
9.	"Faith (Live Version At UNO Lakefront Arena, New Orleans, U.S., 10.18.1998)" (George Michael cover)	Limp Bizkit	2:29
10.	"Jump Around (Live Cover Version At UNO Lakefront Arena, New Orleans, U.S., 10.18.1998)" (House of Pain cover)	Limp Bizkit	2:44
11.	"Interlude #3"	C-Minus	0:37
12.	"Check Yo Self (Remix) (Live Version At UNO Lakefront Arena, New Orleans, U.S., 10.18.1998)"	Ice Cube	2:45
13.	"Natural Born Killaz (Live Version At UNO Lakefront Arena, New Orleans, U.S., 10.18.1998)"	Ice Cube	3:06
14.	"Straight Outta Compton/Fuck Tha Police (Live Version At UNO Lakefront Arena, New Orleans, U.S., 10.18.1998)"	Ice Cube	3:36
15.	"Interlude #4"	C-Minus	0:45
16.	"Du Hast (Live Version At UNO Lakefront Arena, New Orleans, U.S., 10.18.1998)"	Rammstein	4:30
17.	"Interlude #5"	C-Minus	1:10
18.	"Shot Liver Medley (Shoots and Ladders/Justin/Predictable/Ball Tongue/Divine/Kill You) (Live Version At UNO Lakefront Arena, New Orleans, LA, USA, 10.18.1998)"	Korn	7:10
19.	"Freak on a Leash (Live Version At Patriot Center, Fairfax, Virginia, U.S., 10.31.1998)"	Korn	4:09
20.	"Twist/Chi (Live Version At UNO Lakefront Arena, New Orleans, 10.18.1998)"	Korn	5:05
21.	"Got the Life / Blind (Hidden Track) (Live Version At UNO Lakefront Arena, New Orleans, 10.18.1998)"	Korn	8:59
Total length:			71:09

Bonus content

No.	Title	Performer(s)	Length
22.	"A.D.I.D.A.S. (Live Version At UNO Lakefront Arena, New Orleans, LA, USA, 10.18.1998)" (Japanese Bonus Track Edition)	Korn	2:45

- "Blind" by Korn is a hidden bonus track featured after "Got the Life". Advance promotional versions of the album omit this bonus track and instead features a fourth Ice Cube track called "Wicked" as track number 15.

== Trivia ==
- In one of the more infamous moments, Rammstein's band members dressed up for Halloween. Most of them were practically naked with the exception of Richard Kruspe, who wore a wedding dress. Police dragged the members off the stage for indecent exposure and the concert ended after a mere 10 minutes.
- The song "Jump Around", performed by Limp Bizkit, is a cover of DJ Lethal's former band House of Pain's "Jump Around".
