= Family Values Tour =

Former rock and hip hop tour

- Genre: Nu metal; rap metal; funk metal; alternative metal; industrial metal; Hip-hop; alternative rock; post-grunge; post-hardcore; metalcore
- Dates: Fall, summer
- Locations: United States, Canada
- Years active: 1998, 1999, 2001, 2006, 2007, 2013
- Founders: Korn

The Family Values Tour was a reoccurring rock and hip-hop tour held by the American nu metal band Korn since 1998. The first tour took place in 1998 and the second tour in 1999, but the tour took a hiatus in 2000 due to heavy competition from the Anger Management Tour, the Summer Sanitarium Tour, and others. The Family Values Tour returned in 2001 (without Korn) before taking another hiatus, this time for five years. The Family Values Tour returned in 2006 with Korn and Deftones as the headliners. Another tour occurred in 2007, before taking another hiatus until 2013. In 2013 the event took place for the final time as a one-day music festival instead of the traditional tour under the name "Family Values Festival".

== History ==
=== Family Values Tour 1998 ===
Korn, Limp Bizkit, Ice Cube, Incubus (who replaced Ice Cube on October 25, 1998 for the four remaining dates), Orgy, and Rammstein.

In one of the more infamous moments, Rammstein's band members were all dragged off stage by police and subsequently arrested during their Halloween performance. Each band decided to dress up while Rammstein were barely dressed at all, with most members performing in their underwear. Their lead guitarist Richard Kruspe was the only one decently dressed-he wore a wedding dress. The band had to spend the night in jail on charges of indecent exposure.

==== Ice Cube replacement ====
On October 25, 1998 due to the beginning of shooting the movie Next Friday, Ice Cube was replaced by alternative band Incubus for the remaining four dates. The band is featured on the Family Values Tour '98 CD release with the song "New Skin" and can be also seen during performance of "All in the Family" on the DVD release.

==== Feud with Rob Zombie ====
Initially Rob Zombie was to be one of the tour's participating artists, but he was dropped from the tour due to high production costs (each Rob Zombie concert would cost $125,000 in band fees and show production alone). Therefore, Rob Zombie was replaced by German industrial metal act Rammstein.

However, the official explanation was somewhat confusing. The Firm, Korn's management, said Zombie continually expressed dissatisfaction over not wanting to work with a hip-hop act on the bill and was supposedly lectured by Rob Zombie's management that "rock kids don't like hip-hop." Rob Zombie's manager Andy Gould said those comments were false. He explained that Zombie had never even spoken to Korn, so he could not have made those comments.

Although the statement released by Korn's management resulted in anger, Rob Zombie shared no bad blood with the bands participating in the Family Values Tour. In 1999, both Rob Zombie and Korn got on good terms again and launched the highly successful "Rock is Dead" tour together. Korn also toured with Rob Zombie in the summer of 2016.

=== Family Values Tour 1999 ===
Headliners:

- Limp Bizkit
- Filter
- Staind

On select dates:

- Korn (from October 5 to October 13)
- The Crystal Method (first part of the tour until the October 13 tour date)
- Mobb Deep (first part of the tour until the October 8 tour date)
- Run-DMC (started on September 24 as a surprise guest until October 3)
- Primus (second part of the tour, started on the October 13 tour date)
- Method Man and Redman (second part of the tour, started on the October 16 date)
- Sevendust (replaced Filter on the October 23 tour date)

Korn did not take a full part in the tour, instead making surprise appearances at a handful of dates.

Insane Clown Posse and System of a Down were originally scheduled for the tour but did not make the final roster. Controversy arose over System of a Down's cancelled appearance, with speculation arising to believe Fred Durst had removed the band due to a falling out with the band Taproot after failing to negotiate them a record contract. After things had soured with Durst, System of a Down aided the band in securing a more satisfactory contract. Methods of Mayhem was also offered to take part of the tour.

DMX and Ja Rule were also on the bill for the first half of the tour, but cancelled all the shows prior to the beginning of the tour. Mobb Deep and Run-DMC became their replacements on the tour.

Sevendust filled in for Filter on the Denver date while Filter took time off to film the video for "Take a Picture".

It was during this tour that Staind's frontman Aaron Lewis, alongside Limp Bizkit's Fred Durst, performed the emotional hit single "Outside" for the first time in Biloxi, Mississippi. This live version quickly found widespread radio play before being recorded in the studio for Staind's next album Break the Cycle. Footage of this on-stage performance also was used for the song's music video.

==== Dates ====
Date	City	Country	Venue
September 21, 1999	Pittsburgh	United States	Civic Arena
September 22, 1999	Auburn Hills	United States	The Palace of Auburn Hills
September 24, 1999	University Park	United States	Bryce Jordan Center
September 26, 1999	Hampton	United States	Hampton Coliseum
September 28, 1999	Worcester	United States	Worcester Centrum
September 29, 1999	Albany	United States	Pepsi Arena
October 1, 1999	Hartford	United States	Hartford Civic Center
October 2, 1999	Uniondale	United States	Nassau Coliseum
October 3, 1999	Philadelphia	United States	First Union Center
October 5, 1999	Grand Rapids	United States	Van Andel Arena
October 6, 1999	Indianapolis	United States	Market Square Arena
October 8, 1999	Columbus	United States	Schottenstein Center
October 9, 1999	Rosemont	United States	Allstate Arena
October 10, 1999	St. Louis	United States	Kiel Center
October 12, 1999	Kansas City	United States	Kemper Arena
October 13, 1999	Minneapolis	United States	Target Center
October 16, 1999	Portland	United States	Rose Garden Arena
October 17, 1999	Tacoma	United States	Tacoma Dome
October 19, 1999	San Francisco	United States	Cow Palace
October 20, 1999	Sacramento	United States	ARCO Arena
October 22, 1999	Phoenix	United States	America West Arena
October 23, 1999	Anaheim	United States	Arrowhead Pond
October 25, 1999	Denver	United States	Pepsi Center
October 28, 1999	Houston	United States	Compaq Center
October 30, 1999	San Antonio	United States	Alamodome
October 31, 1999	Biloxi	United States	Mississippi Coast Coliseum
November 1, 1999	Dallas	United States	Reunion Arena

Cancellations and rescheduled dates

Date	City	Country	Venue	Fate	Reason
October 27, 1999	Dallas	United States	Reunion Arena	Rescheduled to November 1	Illness

=== Family Values Tour 2001 ===
Bands taking part in the 2001 tour were Stone Temple Pilots, Linkin Park, Staind, Static-X, Deadsy, and Spike 1000 (replacing Deadsy on only the first five dates). This is the only Family Values Tour not to feature Korn, who at the time were busy working on their fifth album Untouchables.

==== Dates ====
Date	City	Country	Venue
October 11, 2001	Cleveland	United States	CSU Convocation Center
October 12, 2001	Rosemont	United States	Allstate Arena
October 13, 2001	Saint Paul	United States	Xcel Energy Center
October 15, 2001	Auburn Hills	United States	The Palace of Auburn Hills
October 16, 2001	Indianapolis	United States	Conseco Fieldhouse
October 17, 2001	Lafayette	United States	Cajundome
October 18, 2001	Washington, D.C.	United States	MCI Center
October 19, 2001	Columbus	United States	Schottenstein Center
October 20, 2001	Toronto	Canada	Toronto Skydome
October 22, 2001	Philadelphia	United States	First Union Center
October 23, 2001	Albany	United States	Pepsi Arena
October 24, 2001	East Rutherford	United States	Continental Airlines Arena
October 26, 2001	Hartford	United States	Hartford Civic Center
October 27, 2001	Worcester	United States	The Centrum
October 28, 2001	Buffalo	United States	HSBC Arena
October 30, 2001	Charlotte	United States	Cricket Arena
October 31, 2001	Atlanta	United States	Philips Arena
November 2, 2001	Sunrise	United States	National Car Rental Center
November 3, 2001	Tampa	United States	Ice Palace
November 4, 2001	Biloxi	United States	Mississippi Coast Coliseum
November 6, 2001	Dallas	United States	Reunion Arena
November 8, 2001	Denver	United States	Pepsi Center
November 10, 2001	Anaheim	United States	Arrowhead Pond
November 11, 2001	Phoenix	United States	Arizona Veterans Memorial Coliseum
November 13, 2001	San Jose	United States	Compaq Center
November 14, 2001	Sacramento	United States	ARCO Arena
November 16, 2001	Portland	United States	Rose Garden Arena
November 17, 2001	Tacoma	United States	Tacoma Dome

=== Family Values Tour 2006 ===
Korn, Deftones, Stone Sour, Flyleaf, Dir En Grey, 10 Years, Deadsy, Bury Your Dead, Bullets and Octane, and Walls of Jericho.

==== Controversies ====
In 2006, a violent fight allegedly broke out in the mosh pit at the Family Values Tour in Atlanta, Georgia during the Deftones performance, resulting in the death of 30-year-old Andy Richardson on August 1, 2006. Lawyers representing Mr. Richardson's family said they may pursue civil actions against Korn and the show's promoters.

Andy's mother, Gloria Richardson, said in a statement to Fox News Service on August 1, 2006 that "It's not right that someone could go to a concert for a good time and wind up dead. There needs to be more security or they need to not have these concerts at all". One week later, 24-year-old Michael Scott Axley was arrested and charged with Richardson's murder. Witnesses claim Axley punched Richardson, causing his head to hit the concrete floor and suffer an injury that ultimately proved fatal.

=== Family Values Tour 2007 ===
Main Stage: Korn, Evanescence, Atreyu, Flyleaf, Hellyeah, Trivium, and Neurosonic.

Side Stage: Droid, Five Finger Death Punch, Through You, Invitro, Twin Method, and Bloodsimple.

=== Family Values Festival 2013 ===
On August 30, 2013 Korn revealed to Billboard that they were bringing the tour back as a one-day event festival. On September 3, 2013, it was revealed that the Family Values Festival would take place in Broomfield, CO at the 1stBank Center.

Korn, Hollywood Undead, Asking Alexandria, Machine Gun Kelly, Beware of Darkness, and Love and Death.

== CD and DVD releases ==
- The Family Values Tour 1999
- The Family Values Tour 2001
- Family Values Tour 2006

The initial edition of Family Values Tour was highly successful and it was documented on separate DVD and CD releases, both put on sale on March 30, 1999 via Immortal/Epic Records. The CD release achieved gold record status in the United States while the DVD release went platinum.
