= Follow the Leader (Korn album) =

- Cover art by Todd McFarlane, Greg Capullo and Brian Haberlin

Studio album by Korn
- Released: August 18, 1998
- Recorded: March–May 1998
- Studio: NRG Recording Studios (North Hollywood, California)
- Genres: Nu metal; alternative metal
- Length: 70:01 (67:03 in the digital release)
- Labels: Immortal; Epic
- Producers: Steve Thompson; Toby Wright; Korn

Korn chronology
Life Is Peachy (1996)	Follow the Leader (1998)	Issues (1999)

Singles from Follow the Leader
- 1. "All in the Family" Released: July 18, 1998; 2. "Got the Life" Released: November 23, 1998; 3. "Freak on a Leash" Released: February 25, 1999

Follow the Leader (stylized as FOLLOW the LEADEЯ) is the third studio album by American nu metal band Korn. It was released on August 18, 1998, through both Immortal and Epic Records. This was their first album not produced by Ross Robinson, instead being produced by Steve Thompson and Toby Wright.

The album peaked at number one on four national charts, including the US Billboard 200 with 268,000 units sold in its first week of release. Follow the Leader is the band's most commercially successful album, being certified five-times Platinum by the RIAA. Its singles, "Got the Life" and "Freak on a Leash", both charted on more than three charts, and their music videos are considered to be the first music videos retired from MTV, most notably the MTV show Total Request Live. The album generally received positive reviews by critics; AllMusic saying the album is "an effective follow-up to [Korn's] first two alt-metal landmarks." It is often regarded as the album that launched nu metal into mainstream ubiquity. In 2018, readers of Revolver voted it as the third-greatest nu metal album of all time. In 2025, Rae Lemeshow-Barooshian of Loudwire included the album in her list of "the top 50 nu-metal albums of all time", ranking it eighth.

The Family Values Tour promoted the album, along with its five singles. The song "Freak on a Leash" was nominated for nine MTV Video Music Awards, and won for the Best Rock Video award, as well as Best Editing. The music video for "Freak on a Leash" won Best Short Form Music Video at the 2000 Grammy Awards.

== Recording and production ==
By January 1998, Korn returned to the studio to record Follow the Leader. Even though Korn was impressed by the work Ross Robinson had done on their previous albums, they decided to work with producer Steve Thompson and engineer Toby Wright. Robinson did, however, work with singer Jonathan Davis as a vocal coach for the album. According to Wright, Robinson went to extreme lengths to agitate Davis in the vocal booth, including punching him in the back repeatedly. Korn implemented a live streaming department on their website in March 1998, called Korn TV, which aired the After-School Special series. Using RealMedia software, fans could access it every Thursday from 7:30 pm to 8:30 pm Eastern time. Korn's After-School Special featured guest appearances such as Sugar Ray, Limp Bizkit, Deftones, Steve Vai, 311, and the Pharcyde. The band was shown making the record on Korn TV. Korn exposed themselves making the album to let their fans see what they were doing in the studio and behind the scenes. Follow the Leader features numerous guest vocalists, including Ice Cube on "Children of the Korn", Tre Hardson of the Pharcyde on "Cameltosis" and Limp Bizkit's Fred Durst on "All in the Family". The songs for the album were written and copyrighted in 1997, with the exception of "Children of the Korn", "All in the Family" and "Cameltosis", which are copyrighted from 1998. Mid-way through the album's production, Korn fired Thompson and Wright became the album's producer. "We weren't seeing eye-to-eye on things and bumped heads a lot. He's an awesome producer, but we thought it'd be better if he went", Davis told Kerrang!. Thompson's firing delayed the album's production as all of its vocal tracks had to be re-recorded. By June 1998, the band were mixing the album.

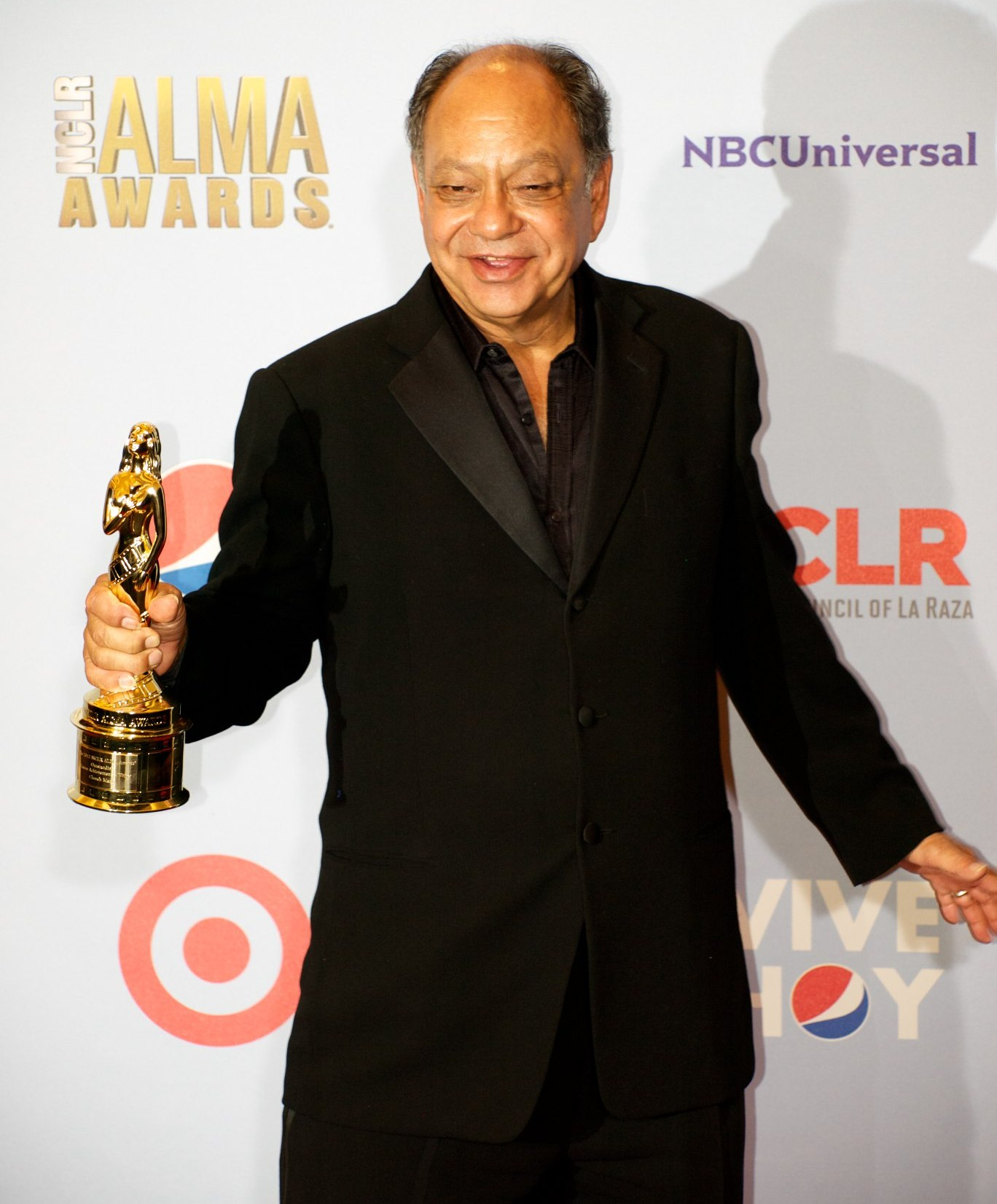
The hidden track "Earache My Eye" features comedian Cheech Marin of Cheech & Chong.

In a 2013 interview, the band revealed that they partied heavily during the production of Follow the Leader, with massive amounts of alcohol, drugs, and women in the studio. Davis explained further, saying that while recording the vocals for "It's On", there were "people getting blowjobs right behind me, there was girls banging each other in front of me, people getting boned in the closet right behind me, it was the craziest shit I've ever seen in my life and I sang that song." According to Davis, he only agreed to begin tracking vocals when producer Toby Wright met his demands for an eight-ball (a one-eighth ounce of cocaine).

=== Photography and illustration ===
The artwork for Follow the Leader was done by Todd McFarlane Entertainment, with McFarlane and fellow Image Comics artists Greg Capullo (penciller) and Brian Haberlin (colorist) doing the album cover, and designer Brent Ashe handling the graphics work. According to drummer David Silveria, the band got interested in McFarlane after hearing that "Todd had actually referred to us as 'the Doors of the 90's'", leading to them recording a song for Spawn, a film based on a comic book by McFarlane, and eventually approaching the artist to make an album cover for them. The cover art depicts a child hopscotching toward the edge of a cliff and a gathering of kids waiting to follow, a concept that began with bassist Reginald "Fieldy" Arvizu and sketched by a friend of Davis before being submitted to McFarlane. It marked the third straight Korn cover featuring children in a disturbing context, which Davis explained by saying that "Children are always scared when they're all happy and stuff. They're the most beautiful thing in the world, but when you see it in our artwork, the way we've placed it, it's just kinda fuckin' weird." The "Freak on a Leash" music video features animated segments by McFarlane featuring this cover art.

== Release and promotion ==
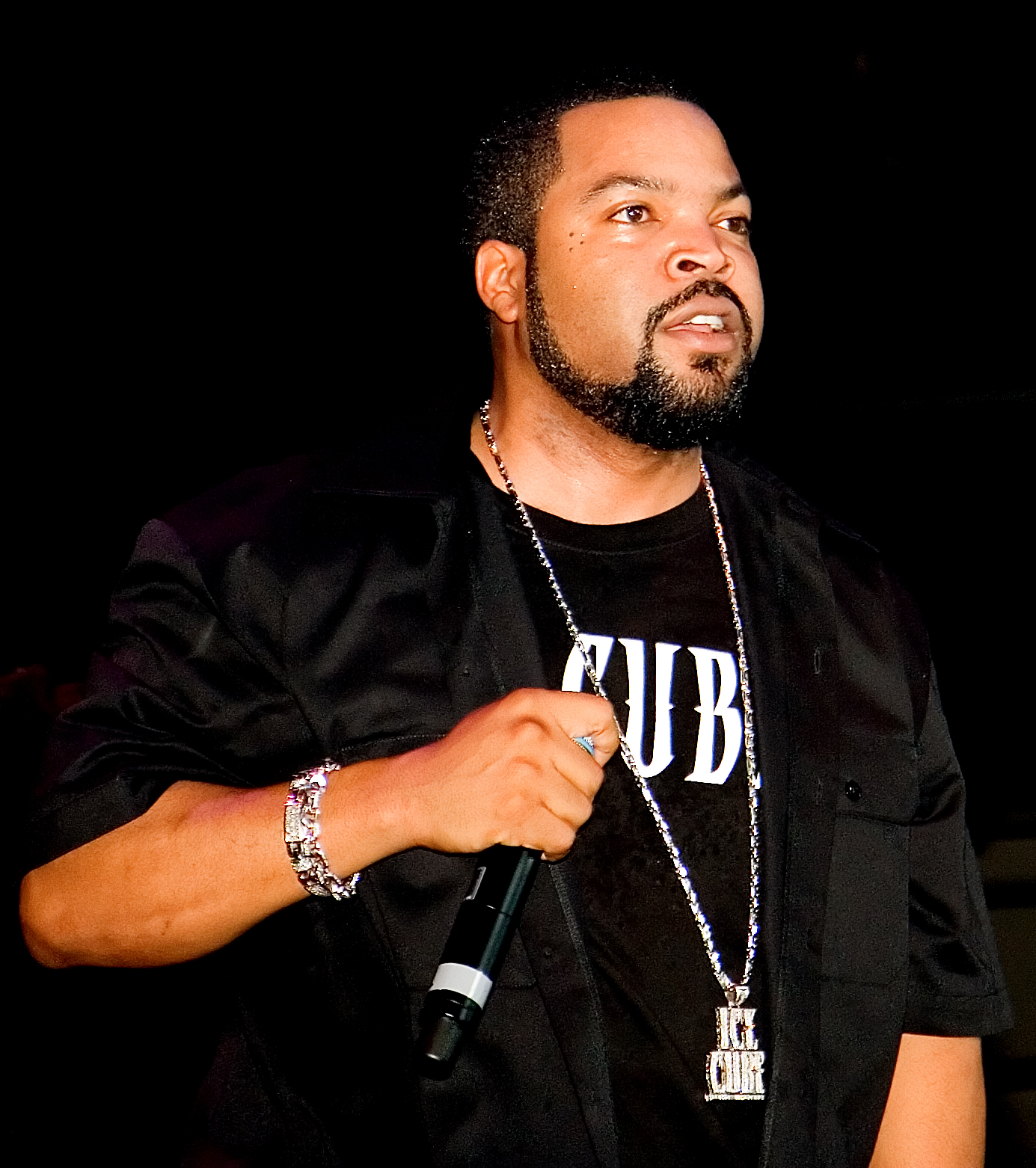
Rapper Ice Cube is featured on the track "Children of the Korn".

Korn embarked on a promotional tour for the upcoming album across North America, which began on August 17, 1998, at Tower Records in Los Angeles and ended in early September. Named Korn Kampaign, it was inspired by the styles of political campaigns and press conferences, but instead, these were aimed at fans.

Follow the Leader was released on August 18, 1998, through Immortal/Epic. Follow the Leader is recognized as Korn's mainstream breakthrough, and the album that launched nu metal into the mainstream.

In the fall of 1998, Korn started the Family Values Tour. According to Arvizu, the tour name was due to "so many of their friends who were like family to us played in bands". The Family Values Tour featured the unveiling of a steel cage to the rear of the stage called the Korn Kage, holding radio contest winners. The idea of the Korn Kage came originally from Arvizu. The tour started on September 22, 1998, ending on October 31, 1998. The tour grossed $6.5 million (6,500,000 in 1999), with an average gross of $240,000 per show and an average attendance per show at 9,000. Korn maintained a generally low ticket price, usually no more than thirty dollars. Korn toured with the band Limp Bizkit, as well as Ice Cube, Orgy, Incubus, and Rammstein. The tour was considered to be a major success, and promoted Follow the Leader to sales that were considered to have "skyrocketed". However, unlike all their other tours, they opted not to play in Europe for this cycle.

The album was also promoted through Concrete Marketing's Concrete Corner program with Jim Rose of Jim Rose Circus as the pitchman. The promotion saw 100,000 copies of a compilation CD featuring tracks of breakthrough artists approved by Korn, as well as a previously unreleased Korn track, being shrink-wrapped to the album at participating stores and given away for free with each purchase of the album. Band artists (at the time) featured on this CD included Kid Rock, Orgy, Powerman 5000 and Limp Bizkit. The album had five singles issued: "All in the Family", "Got the Life", "Freak on a Leash", "Children of the Korn", and "B.B.K."

In January 1999, Korn participated in the Australian tour of the Big Day Out festival. To continue promoting Follow the Leader, Korn launched a co-headlining US tour with Rob Zombie and Videodrone as the opening act that began on February 26, 1999, through mid-April. The tour was decided between Korn and Zombie as a reconciliation after a dispute due to the latter's non-participation in the Family Values Tour 1998. The tour was named Rock Is Dead and converged with the dates of Marilyn Manson's tour of the same name. In addition, a larger Korn Kage was included onstage, and the tour featured Davis beginning to wear a kilt in live performances. During this tour, Korn's members switched places to perform "Earache My Eye"; guitarists James "Munky" Shaffer and Brian "Head" Welch swapped sides while Davis played the drums and Silveria the bass, and Arvizu took the microphone to sing. Korn and Zombie's Rock Is Dead Tour was a commercial and critical success.

== Composition ==
Follow the Leader is seventy minutes and eight seconds long. AllMusic said, "They write songs, but those wind up not being nearly as memorable as their lurching metallic hip-hop grind." Entertainment Weekly commented that Follow the Leader was Korn's "gimmick", while saying the album had "steely riffs" and "stomping beats". Tower Records said the album "combines streamlined metal with ominous industrial touches and an undercurrent of hip-hop rhythm," and also said it was an "urban nightmare". The album is considered to be nu metal, but also spans other genres such as alternative metal and rap rock.

"Freak on a Leash"
Both "Freak on a Leash" and "Got the Life" are among the first music videos to be retired from MTV's Total Request Live. The song was a "boiling straw".

The album features 25 tracks, 12 of which last five seconds of silence, making the first 1 minute of the album all silent. The concept of the song "Justin" was about a boy with the same name dying of intestinal cancer. His last wish was to meet the members of Korn. Winston-Salem Journal writer Ed Bumgardner described Korn's work as having "shaped rap, metal, and punk into a sonic maelstrom that is brutal, aggressive - and reasonably musical". The Daily News said that "the band shovels chunky beats into an already complex sound..." Michael Mehle of Rocky Mountain News said, "For the uninitiated, the classic Korn sound comes rumbling out of the speakers on the first cut: It's On! grinds fuzzy guitars, thunderous beats, and shouts of gut-wrenching rage into an anthem for the alienated", and gave other positive remarks. The Charlotte Observer said the album was dark, but humble. A Zeeland high school assistant principal said in an interview for a Michigan newspaper that the music is "indecent, vulgar, obscene, and intends to be insulting". She said this after giving a student a one-day suspension for wearing a Korn shirt.

== Critical reception ==
Professional ratings
Review scores
Source	Rating
AllMusic	4.5/5 stars
Christgau's Consumer Guide	C
The Encyclopedia of Popular Music	4/5 stars
Entertainment Weekly	B−
The Guardian	3/5 stars
Pitchfork	6.9/10
Rolling Stone	4/5 stars
The Rolling Stone Album Guide	3/5 stars
Spin	7/10
USA Today	3.5/4 stars

Follow the Leader received generally positive reviews. Stephen Thomas Erlewine of AllMusic called it "an effective follow-up to their first two alt-metal landmarks." David Fricke of Rolling Stone wrote that Korn "have an ideal record for those long, black days when all you can do is say 'What the Fuck! What the Fuck! What the Fuck!' at bloody murder volume". Yahoo! Music critic Janiss Garza described the album as "intensely tortured and savage as ever", while noting that "in spite of all this distress and suffering, Korn does loosen up". Entertainment Weekly reviewer Jim Farber called it "a big load of dumb fun" and "also incredibly perverse, going to almost laughable lengths to mess with metal cliché", concluding that if "hardly innovative enough to rival the classics of metal, at least Korn's LP gives this once-stagnant style kernels of something new". Jon Pareles from The New York Times said the album was "choppy", describing Davis as "wrestling with self-hatred, violent impulses, parental execration, and a confused sexual identity..." In a negative review, Robert Christgau of The Village Voice said that, although Korn "deny they're metal", they "nevertheless demonstrate that the essence of metal ... is self-obliterating volume and self-aggrandizing display." The album is featured in the book 1001 Albums You Must Hear Before You Die.

=== Accolades ===
Accolades for Follow the Leader
Publication	List	Rank
Digitaldreamdoor	100 Greatest Albums of 1998	7
Loudersound	50 Best Nu-Metal Albums of all Time	5
Loudwire	10 Best Hard Rock Albums from 1998	1
Loudwire	50 Greatest Nu-Metal Albums of all Time	9
Loudwire	The Best Hard Rock Album of Each Year Since 1970	1
NME	100 greatest heavy metal albums of all Time	36
Revolver	20 Great Albums from 1998	_
Rocksound	Albums of the Year (1998)	1
Rolling Stone (United States)	100 Best Albums of 1998	40
Discover Music	The 67 Best Albums of 1998	20

== Legacy ==
=== Appearances in other media ===
In 2000, a bedroom poster of the album was shown in the tenth episode of Nickelodeon sitcom The Amanda Show. That year, "Freak on a Leash" appeared in an episode of the MTV animated series Daria, titled "Mart of Darkness". In 2007, "Freak on a Leash" was used in an episode of The Simpsons titled "Stop, or My Dog Will Shoot!". The following year, the song appeared in the video game Guitar Hero World Tour. The song also appeared on the soundtrack for the 2025 video game Madden NFL 26. In 2017, "Got the Life" was featured in episode 7 of the CNN documentary miniseries The Nineties, with the episode focusing on the music of the 1990s.

== Commercial performance ==
Follow the Leader peaked at number one on four U.S. charts, including the Billboard 200, and peaked at number five in the United Kingdom. The album received a 5× platinum certification in the United States, as well as a triple platinum in Australia and Canada. Follow the Leader also received a gold certification in the Netherlands and was awarded multi-platinum certification for shipments in excess of five million copies, by the RIAA on March 15, 2002.

The album's first charting single, "Got the Life", released on July 24, 1998, peaked at number 15 on the Mainstream Rock Songs chart, and received a gold certification in Australia. The album's next charting single, "Freak on a Leash", released in February 1999, peaked at number six on the Alternative Songs chart, as well as number six on the Bubbling Under Hot 100, and like "Got the Life", received a gold certification in Australia. "Freak on a Leash" was nominated for nine MTV Video Music Awards, and won for the Best Rock Video award, as well as Best Editing.

== Track listing ==
All songs written by Korn except "Earache My Eye" written by Tommy Chong, Gaye Delorme and Richard Marin. All guest appearances feature an extra writing credit by the guest.

=== Original release ===
( (Note: The original physical release features 25 tracks. The album starts with 12 silent tracks, each 5 seconds in length. Combined, they represent a minute of silence for Justin; the subject matter of the identically titled track. In interviews, Jonathan Davis also mentioned he was very superstitious and did not want to end an album on track 13. The digital version removes all the silent tracks.))

No.	Title	Length
13.	"It's On!"	4:28
14.	"Freak on a Leash"	4:15
15.	"Got the Life"	3:45
16.	"Dead Bodies Everywhere"	4:44
17.	"Children of the Korn" (featuring Ice Cube)	3:52
18.	"B.B.K."	3:56
19.	"Pretty"	4:12
20.	"All in the Family" (featuring Fred Durst)	4:48
21.	"Reclaim My Place"	4:32
22.	"Justin"	4:17
23.	"Seed"	5:54
24.	"Cameltosis" (featuring Slimkid3)	4:38
25.	"My Gift to You" (includes hidden track (Note: "My Gift to You" ends at 7:16. A hidden track entitled "Earache My Eye", a Cheech & Chong cover, starts at 10:50 after 2 minutes of silence and an interlude that lasts around a minute and 40 seconds. The track itself is around 4 minutes 50 seconds long. On the digital version, the tracks are separated.))	15:40
Total length:		70:01

=== Digital release ===
No.	Title	Length
1.	"It's On!"	4:28
2.	"Freak on a Leash"	4:15
3.	"Got the Life"	3:45
4.	"Dead Bodies Everywhere"	4:44
5.	"Children of the Korn"	3:52
6.	"B.B.K."	3:56
7.	"Pretty"	4:12
8.	"All in the Family"	4:48
9.	"Reclaim My Place"	4:32
10.	"Justin"	4:17
11.	"Seed"	5:54
12.	"Cameltosis"	4:38
13.	"My Gift to You"	7:16
14.	"Earache My Eye" (Cheech and Chong cover)	6:26
Total length:		67:03

== Personnel ==
=== Korn ===
- Jonathan Davis – lead vocals, bagpipes
- Head – guitar
- Munky – guitar, talk box on "Freak on a Leash" and "Dead Bodies Everywhere"
- Fieldy – bass, vocals on "Earache My Eye"
- David Silveria – drums

=== Additional vocalists ===
- Fred Durst – on "All in the Family"
- Tre Hardson – on "Cameltosis"
- Ice Cube – on "Children of the Korn"
- Cheech Marin – on "Earache My Eye"

=== Production staff ===
- Todd McFarlane and Greg Capullo – artwork
- Brian Haberlin – artwork (coloring)
- Joseph Cultice – photography
- Tommy D. Daugherty – programming
- John Ewing Jr. – engineer, assistant engineer
- Ross Robinson – vocal coaching
- Stephen Marcussen – mastering
- Brendan O'Brien – mixing
- Steve Thompson – producer
- Don C. Tyler – digital editing
- Justin Z. Walden – additional drums, programming
- Toby Wright – producer, engineer

== Charts ==
=== Weekly charts ===
1998 weekly chart performance for Follow the Leader
Chart (1998)	Peak position
Australian Albums (ARIA)	1
Austrian Albums (Ö3 Austria)	7
Belgian Albums (Ultratop Flanders)	13
Belgian Albums (Ultratop Wallonia)	30
Canadian Albums (Billboard)	1
Dutch Albums (Album Top 100)	7
Estonia Top CD Albums (Eesti Top 10)	7
European Albums (European Top 100 Albums)	6
Finnish Albums (Suomen virallinen lista)	4
French Albums (SNEP)	5
German Albums (Offizielle Top 100)	12
Hungarian Albums (MAHASZ)	7
Italian Albums (FIMI)	10
Japanese Albums (Oricon)	27
New Zealand Albums (RMNZ)	1
Norwegian Albums (VG-lista)	5
Scottish Albums (Official Charts)	12
Swedish Albums (Sverigetopplistan)	24
UK Albums (Official Charts)	5
UK Rock & Metal Albums (Official Charts)	1
US Billboard 200	1

2022–2024 weekly chart performance for Follow the Leader
Chart (2022–2024)	Peak position
Greek Albums (IFPI)	2
UK Rock & Metal Albums (Official Charts)	30
US Top Hard Rock Albums (Billboard)	22

=== Year-end charts ===
1998 year-end chart performance for Follow the Leader
Chart (1998)	Position
Australian Albums (ARIA)	49
Canada Top Albums/CDs (RPM)	64
US Billboard 200	77

1999 year-end chart performance for Follow the Leader
Chart (1999)	Position
Australian Albums (ARIA)	14
US Billboard 200	32

== Certifications ==
Certifications for Follow the Leader
Region	Certification	Certified units/sales
Australia (ARIA)	3× Platinum	210,000^{^}
Brazil (Pro-Música Brasil)	Gold	100,000^{*}
Canada (Music Canada)	3× Platinum	300,000^{^}
France (SNEP)	Gold	100,000^{*}
Mexico (AMPROFON)	Platinum	250,000^{^}
Netherlands (NVPI)	Gold	50,000^{^}
New Zealand (RMNZ)	Platinum	15,000^{^}
United Kingdom (BPI)	Gold	100,000^{^}
United States (RIAA)	5× Platinum	5,000,000^{^}
^{*} Sales figures based on certification alone.^{^} Shipments figures based on certification alone.

== Bibliography ==
- Arvizu, Reginald (2009). Got The Life. William Marrow. ISBN 978-0-06-166249-2.
- Furman, Leah (May 5, 2000). Korn: Life in the Pit. St. Martin's Griffin. ISBN 0-312-25396-6.
