= Got the Life =

Single by Korn

from the album Follow the Leader
- B-side: "I Can Remember"
- Released: 1998
- Recorded: April 1998
- Studio: NRG (North Hollywood)
- Genre: Nu metal; rap metal
- Length: 3:45
- Label: Epic
- Songwriters: Reginald Arvizu; Jonathan Davis; James Shaffer; David Silveria; Brian Welch
- Producers: Steve Thompson; Toby Wright; Korn

Korn singles chronology
"All in the Family" (1998)	"Got the Life" (1998)	"Children of the Korn" (1998)

Music video
- "Got the Life" on YouTube

"Got the Life" is a song by American nu metal band Korn. It was released in 1998, as the second single from their third album, Follow the Leader (1998). The song was recorded in April 1998 at NRG Recording Studios. The band decided they would release the song as a promotional single after each member found that there was something "special" about the song. The single had "phenomenal success", and its music video was requested more than any other video on MTV's TRL, making it the first officially "retired" music video.

"Got the Life" did not receive much attention in the music press; however, the song was rewarded a gold certification in Australia by the Australian Recording Industry Association, platinum in New Zealand by Recorded Music NZ, and silver in the United Kingdom by the British Phonographic Industry. It peaked at number one on the Canadian RPM Rock/Alternative Chart, as well as number fifteen on the US Billboard Mainstream Rock Tracks chart and number seventeen on the US Billboard Modern Rock Tracks chart.

== Background and release ==
"Got the Life" was written in 1997 recorded in April 1998 at NRG Recording Studios in North Hollywood, California. After recording the song, the group's members each felt that there was something "special" about the song. Lead vocalist Jonathan Davis claimed that it reminded him of "something you might hear at raves", which were very popular at the time. Even though they thought that many fans would not appreciate the song, they released it as a promotional single in early August 1998, before the release of Follow the Leader. "Got the Life" was said by Leah Furman to be "revolved around the mixed blessings of fame."

The single was sent to radio stations on July 24, 1998, and has been released five times. The single's first release was on August 10, 1998, where it was released with two versions in the United States. The single contains different mixes of the song, including "Deejay Punk-Roc Remix" and the instrumental "D.O.S.E.'s Woollyback Remix." The single also apprehends B-sides and remixes to earlier songs. Stephen Thomas Erlewine reviewed the single, giving it two out of five stars, and noting that "the 'Deejay Punk-Roc Remix' is pretty good, but the instrumental is of negligible worth. The second part of the single is backed with 'I Can Remember' plus 'Good God (OOMPH! vs. Such A Surge Remix)'. The single was also released in Australia, and in the United Kingdom twice. The single was considered to have had "phenomenal success".

== Composition ==
"Got the Life" music sheet.

"Got the Life" is three minutes and forty-five seconds long. It is the shortest song on Follow the Leader, and like the album the single was produced by Steve Thompson and Toby Wright, and was mixed by Brendan O'Brien. "Got the Life (Deejay Punk-Roc remix)" was mixed by DeeJay Punk-Roc (Jon Paul Davies), and was recorded at Airdog Funk Research Department and Liverpool, England. The D.O.S.E.'s Woollyback remix was mixed by D.O.S.E. in courtesy of Mercury Records.

The song starts off with a single percussion beat, leading into the refrain riff, with a triple guitar overdub. When the verses emerge, lead singer Jonathan Davis begins singing with the lyrical line "Hate, something, sometime, someway, something kicked on the front floor." Korn performed the song with the following members: Jonathan Davis performing vocals, Brian "Head" Welch and James "Munky" Shaffer performing guitars, Reginald "Fieldy" Arvizu, performing on the bass guitar, and David Silveria on the drum kit.

In a 2013 interview with Scuzz, Jonathan Davis revealed that "Got the Life" originally contained an audio sample at the very beginning - a piece of dialogue spoken by actor Dom DeLuise in the 1974 film Blazing Saddles. Warner Brothers would not allow its usage, however, so it was removed prior to the song's release.

== Music video ==
"I would give my car to a bum. I thought Tre from Pharcyde could play the bum. I wanted to blow up cars and other fancy material things in the video as a way to show that we didn't care about those things. We could end the video with a shot of a big backyard party with all of [their] friends. In addition, I wanted to put two lowrider bikes in the scene and make it look like we were all down in Mexico, partying and having a good time."

— Reginald Arvizu

Korn decided to shoot a music video for "Got the Life" after the reception from fans and employees at NRG Recording Studios was very positive. The music video's concept was by the band's bassist Reginald "Fieldy" Arvizu. Their managers advised them to request Joseph Kahn to direct the video. Kahn also was the director for "A.D.I.D.A.S." music video in 1997. After asking Kahn to direct their video, he responded saying "That's the stupidest idea I've ever heard." Offended by and against his response, Korn hired McG, director of the band's music videos from their self-titled debut album — "Blind", "Shoots and Ladders", "Clown", and "Faget".

On January 12, 1999, this music video was the first video that was officially co retired from MTV's daily top ten countdown as it was consistently and frequently requested, Total Request Live. MTV's Total Request Live said the song was the most requested music video "for too long so they had to stop airing it so other artists would have a chance at the coveted number one spot." Deuce, the video album where the song's music video appears on, was certified Platinum by the Recording Industry Association of America. California rapper WC makes a cameo appearance in the video dancing. Jay Gordon and Ryan Shuck of Orgy, Brandon Boyd of Incubus, Fred Durst, Sam Rivers, Wes Borland of Limp Bizkit, Eminem, and UFC fighter Tito Ortiz can be seen in the end of the video. The music video starts with a boombox playing "It's On", the opening track from the album.

== Reception ==
AllMusic's Stephen Thomas Erlewine gave the single 2/5 stars, although he stated that the song "rivaled such previous masterworks as 'A.D.I.D.A.S.' and 'Shoots and Ladders'. Their fusion of metal and rap was stronger than ever, boasting their best rhythm tracks to date. Which is good, since the B-sides of the 'Got the Life' singles were devoted to remixes."

"Got the Life" is widely considered to be one of Korn's best songs. In 2019, Loudwire ranked the song number ten on their list of the 50 greatest Korn songs, and in 2021, Kerrang ranked the song number seven on their list of the 20 greatest Korn songs.

"Got the Life" became Korn's first entry on Billboard's Mainstream Rock Songs and Alternative Songs charts, peaking at number fifteen and number seventeen, respectively. The song peaked at number twenty-six in Australia, and shipments of a CD single have surpassed 35,000 units. "Got the Life"'s music video debuted at number eight on MTV's Total Request Live, on September 17, 1998.

== Track listing ==
US single

#	Title	Length	Ref
1.	"Got the Life"	3:45	
2.	"Got the Life (Deejay Punk-Roc Mix)"	5:16	
3.	"Got the Life (D.O.S.E. Woollyback Remix)"	5:27	
4.	"I Can Remember"	3:36	

Single remixes

#	Title	Length	Ref
1.	"Got the Life (Remix)"	3:45	

Australian single

#	Title	Length	Ref
1.	"Got the Life"	3:45	

UK single #1

#	Title	Length	Ref
1.	"Got the Life"	3:45	
2.	"Got the Life" (Deejay Punk-Roc Mix)	5:16	
3.	"Got the Life" (D.O.S.E. Woollyback Remix)	5:27	

UK single #2

#	Title	Length	Ref
1.	"Got the Life"	3:49	
2.	"I Can Remember"	3:39	
3.	"Good God" (Oomph! Vs Such a Surge Remix)	4:06	

== Charts ==
Chart (1998–99)	Peak position
Australia (ARIA)	26
Australia Alternative (ARIA)	4
Canada Rock/Alternative (RPM)	1
Europe (Eurochart Hot 100)	94
Finland Airplay (IFPI Finland)	30
Hungary (MAHASZ)	4
Iceland (Dagblaðið Vísir Top 30)	1
Scottish Singles Sales (Official Charts)	21
UK Singles (Official Charts)	23
US Mainstream Rock Airplay (Billboard)	15
US Alternative Airplay (Billboard)	17

== Certifications ==
Region	Certification	Certified units/sales
Australia (ARIA)	Gold	35,000^{^}
New Zealand (RMNZ)	Platinum	30,000^{‡}
United Kingdom (BPI)	Silver	200,000^{‡}
^{^} Shipments figures based on certification alone.^{‡} Sales+streaming figures based on certification alone.

== See also ==
- List of RPM Rock/Alternative number-one singles (Canada)
