= Break Stuff =

Single by Limp Bizkit

from the album Significant Other
- Released: May 2, 2000
- Genre: Nu metal; rap metal
- Length: 2:48
- Label: Interscope
- Composers: Wes Borland; Sam Rivers; John Otto
- Lyricist: Fred Durst
- Producers: Terry Date; Limp Bizkit

Limp Bizkit singles chronology
| "N 2 Gether Now" (1999) | "Break Stuff" (2000) | "Take a Look Around" (2000) |

Music video
- "Break Stuff" on YouTube

"Break Stuff" is a song by American nu metal band Limp Bizkit. It was released as the fourth and final single from their second studio album, Significant Other (1999). The song was released alongside "N 2 Gether Now", and has remained a staple of Limp Bizkit's live shows.

== Music video ==
The music video was shot at Skatelab. In the video, the band members are seen in some scenes not playing any instruments and in others playing each other's instruments. Cameos include Snoop Dogg, Jonathan Davis of Korn, Dr. Dre, Eminem and his daughter Hailie Jade, Pauly Shore, model Lily Aldridge, and Tony Hawk's son Riley Hawk.

It received its world premiere in February 2000 on the short-lived USA Network music show Farmclub.com, alongside Korn's video for their single, "Make Me Bad". Both groups made a guest appearance to introduce their respective videos.

== Live performances ==
The song was noted for a performance at Woodstock '99 in which violent actions occurred. When the song played, Fred Durst encouraged the crowd to become rowdy, stating, "Don't let anybody get hurt. But I don't think you should mellow out. That's what Alanis Morissette had you motherfuckers do. If someone falls, pick 'em up". In a mosh pit, fans tore plywood on the walls when the song played and numerous sexual assaults were reported to have occurred. During the band's 2001 appearance at the Big Day Out festival in Sydney, Australia, teenager Jessica Michalik was crushed by the unruly crowd near the front of the stage before dying from her injuries.

== Awards and legacy ==
The video for the song won the MTV Video Music Award for the Best Rock Video in 2000.

In 2017, Annie Zaleski of Spin named it the seventh-best nu metal track of all time. In 2019, Joe Smith-Engelhardt of Alternative Press included the song in his list of "Top 10 nü-metal staples that still hold up today".

In 2022, Louder Sound and Kerrang each named "Break Stuff" as Limp Bizkit's greatest song.

In 2025, EA released their trailer for Battlefield 6's multiplayer mode, featuring "Break Stuff" as the main theme.

== Covers ==
- American singer-songwriter K.Flay covered the song in her 2020 EP Don't Judge a Song by Its Cover, along with Green Day's "Brain Stew" and The Offspring's "Self Esteem".
- Russian punk band Pussy Riot covered this song for use in an episode of the Netflix show In From the Cold.
- British metal band Raised by Owls covered this song in December 2024.

== Charts ==
| Chart (1999–2000) | Peak position |
|---|---|
| Australia (ARIA) | 41 |
| Germany (GfK) | 42 |
| Netherlands (Dutch Top 40) | 22 |
| Netherlands (Single Top 100) | 28 |
| Portugal (AFP) | 9 |
| Switzerland (Schweizer Hitparade) | 95 |
| US Bubbling Under Hot 100 (Billboard) | 23 |
| US Alternative Airplay (Billboard) | 14 |
| US Mainstream Rock Airplay (Billboard) | 19 |

| Chart (2025) | Peak position |
|---|---|
| UK Rock & Metal (OCC) | 12 |
| US Hot Rock & Alternative Songs (Billboard) | 13 |

== Certifications ==
| Region | Certification | Certified units/sales |
|---|---|---|
| Germany (BVMI) | Gold | 300,000^{‡} |
| New Zealand (RMNZ) | 4× Platinum | 120,000^{‡} |
| United Kingdom (BPI) | 2× Platinum | 1,200,000^{‡} |
^{‡} Sales+streaming figures based on certification alone.
