= All in the Family (song) =

Single by Korn featuring Fred Durst

from the album Follow the Leader
- Released: July 18, 1998
- Recorded: 1998
- Genre: Comedy Rap, Rap metal, Nu Metal
- Length: 4:53
- Label: Immortal/Epic
- Songwriters: Reginald Arvizu, Jonathan Davis, Fred Durst, James Shaffer, David Silveria, Brian Welch
- Producers: Korn, Steve Thompson, Toby Wright, Tommy D. Daugherty

Korn singles chronology
"Good God" (1997)	"All in the Family" (1998)	"Got the Life" (1998)

"All in the Family" is a song written and recorded by American nu metal band Korn and Limp Bizkit vocalist Fred Durst for Korn's third studio album, Follow the Leader. The demo version was released as a "radio teaser" shortly before the release of the album's second single, "Got the Life".

== Music and structure ==
The song is a rhyme duel between Jonathan Davis and Fred Durst, mixing elements of hip-hop beats, distorted 7-string guitars, and Fieldy's signature bass sound. The song begins with Jonathan and Fred insulting each other on hygiene, sexual orientation, family roots, and other things. At the ending, both say they will perform sexual acts on each other in an ironic way, in fact giving the song a confusing twist. There are lyrical references to each other's songs, including Limp Bizkit's "Counterfeit" and Korn's "Blind", "Shoots and Ladders", and "No Place To Hide". Parts of the riff from "Blind" can also be heard during Jon's insults. Musical acts Vanilla Ice, Hanson, and Winger are also tossed around as insults along with references to the 1993 Waco siege, Buffalo Bill, Jerry Springer, Austin Powers, Raggedy Ann, Zingers, Fruity Pebbles, Funkdoobiest, the Confederate flag, and the opening lyrics to Notorious B.I.G.'s "Mo Money Mo Problems".

== Concept ==
Korn lead singer Jonathan Davis and Fred Durst thought it would be funny if they put out a track where they just shoot insults back and forth at each other, like a good old schoolyard brawl. This was the result. Davis recalled: "Fred was at the studio one day after a Korn-TV taping, and we said, 'Let's do a song together. Hey, man, let's go back and forth and rip on each other like an old-school battle.' I don't know who's [sic] idea it was. I can't remember if it was mine, or Fieldy's, or Fred's, but we came up with the idea and we started writing and we worked on it together. I even came up with some bags on myself for Fred to say. It was all in good-natured fun". Davis and Durst would often offer suggestions for each other's lyrics; a lyric written by Durst as "tootin' on your bagpipe" was changed to "fagpipes" by Davis, who stated "I helped him bag on me better".

In retrospect, the band has expressed regret about the song: In 2015, Davis would refer to the song as "the dumbest fucking track Korn ever did", attributing the song to the excessive drugs and alcohol consumed during the album's production. Davis would later re-iterate this statement in 2022, describing it as the "worst song ever". "It's horrible. We were all drunk in the studio and I was trying to rap. At the time, we were having a good time, but now I just cringe. I've got nothing against Fred, it just sucks! We were out of our minds drunk! It shouldn't have made the record." Guitarist Head concurred with Davis's remarks but added that despite not being his favorite as well, he ranked it as number 8 in his top 11 heaviest Korn riffs.

== Media response ==
In an otherwise positive review of the album, Rolling Stone wrote about the song:

It's too bad that Korn can go so easily from the potent to the pointless. The very next track, "All in the Family", is an MC duel between Davis and Fred Durst of Limp Bizkit, a stomping hip-hop track with a good-natured barrage of insults – except for the "faggot" and "fairy" cracks and lame-o lines like "Suck my dick, kid, like your daddy did" and "You're a fag and on a lower level." To Davis and Durst, that may just be harmless schoolyard jivin'. But Davis knows words can hurt – that was the whole point of "Faget" on Korn – and the homosexual slams in "All in the Family" cheapen, at least for those five minutes, the power and integrity of an album otherwise devoted to kickin' it against cruelty and prejudice.

Similarly, Steve Appleford of the Los Angeles Times called the song "a duet of cheap insults with Bizkit's Fred Durst that only diminishes one of Korn's strongest albums", and the Winston-Salem Journal wrote, "one wonders how [Davis] could stumble so badly with 'All in the Family' – a scatological song crammed with crude jive and anti-gay jibes that severely undercuts an otherwise potent disc." The Austin American-Statesman's critic wrote that the song's "pulsating rhythms... are undermined by countless references to guys' private parts, the f- word, 'faggots' and incest."

Mike Boehm, commenting in the Los Angeles Times, attempted to consider the band's motivations in writing the lyrics:

The homophobic epithets, the band might say, were not meant to disparage gays, but rather meaningless, street-talking jive by two guys "playing the dozens", greatly influential on rap—of verbal combat that emphasizes the competitive trading of fanciful insults. After all, the title "All in the Family" calls back that lovable TV bigot, Archie Bunker, doesn't it?

He goes on to write, "The ugliness of 'All in the Family' doesn't stem from overt homophobia; let's take Davis at his word that he harbors no ill feelings toward gays. Instead, it embodies the ingrained, unthinking homophobic bias that runs strong in our culture."

About the homophobia accusations directed at the song, Fred Durst said: "I called Jon [Davis of Korn] a fag, he called me a fag. We were just poking fun at each other. We didn't mean it in any homophobic way".

In 2021, Kerrang! placed the song on its list of the band's top 20 songs.

== Track listing ==
Remixes single
No.	Title	Length
1.	"All in the Family" (Rough Mix)	4:51
2.	"All in the Family" (Clark World Mix)	4:45
3.	"All in the Family" (Sowing the Beats Mix)	4:51
4.	"Beats in Peace Mix"	4:15
5.	"All in the Family" (Scary Bird Mix)	8:40

Track 2 was remixed by DJ Clark Kent, tracks 3 and 4 were remixed by Level X, and track 5 was remixed by Scarecrow Adams.

Promo single
No.	Title	Length
1.	"All in the Family" (Clark World Mix)	4:45
2.	"All in the Family" (Sowing the Beats Mix)	4:51

=== Weekly charts ===
Chart (1998)	Peak position
Iceland (Dagblaðið Vísir Top 30)	10
