= Re-Arranged =

Single by Limp Bizkit

from the album Significant Other
- Released: October 12, 1999
- Genre: Nu metal; alternative rock
- Length: 5:56
- Label: Flip; Interscope
- Composers: Wes Borland; Sam Rivers; John Otto
- Lyricist: Fred Durst
- Producers: Terry Date; Limp Bizkit

Limp Bizkit singles chronology
"Nookie" (1999)	"Re-Arranged" (1999)	"N 2 Gether Now" (1999)

Music video
- "Re-Arranged" on YouTube

"Re-Arranged" is a song by American nu metal band Limp Bizkit. It was released on October 12, 1999, as the second single from their second album, Significant Other. It was the band's only number one single on the Billboard Modern Rock Tracks chart.

== Music video ==
The music video for "Re-Arranged" features the band being arrested due to the Woodstock '99 controversy. They go through court before being placed in cells until they are finally put in a room to be executed while prison officials and legal executives watch. Milk fills up the room as the band finishes up the song and they drown in the milk. The members are then shown floating in a white void, believing that they are in Heaven. Fred Durst says that if they are in Heaven then he would be kicking it with Method Man. Durst is then dragged away by an unseen force as "To Be Continued" appears on the screen. It is continued in the music video for "N 2 Gether Now," which features Method Man.

== Track listing ==
No.	Title	Length
1.	"Re-Arranged" (Dirty version)
2.	"Faith" (George Michael cover)
3.	"Counterfeit" (Lethal Dose remix)
4.	"Faith" (Music video)

== Charts ==
Chart (1999–2000)	Peak position
Australia (ARIA)	35
Canada Rock/Alternative (RPM)	13
US Billboard Hot 100	88
US Alternative Airplay (Billboard)	1
US Mainstream Rock (Billboard)	8
