= Fred Durst =

American musician (born 1970)

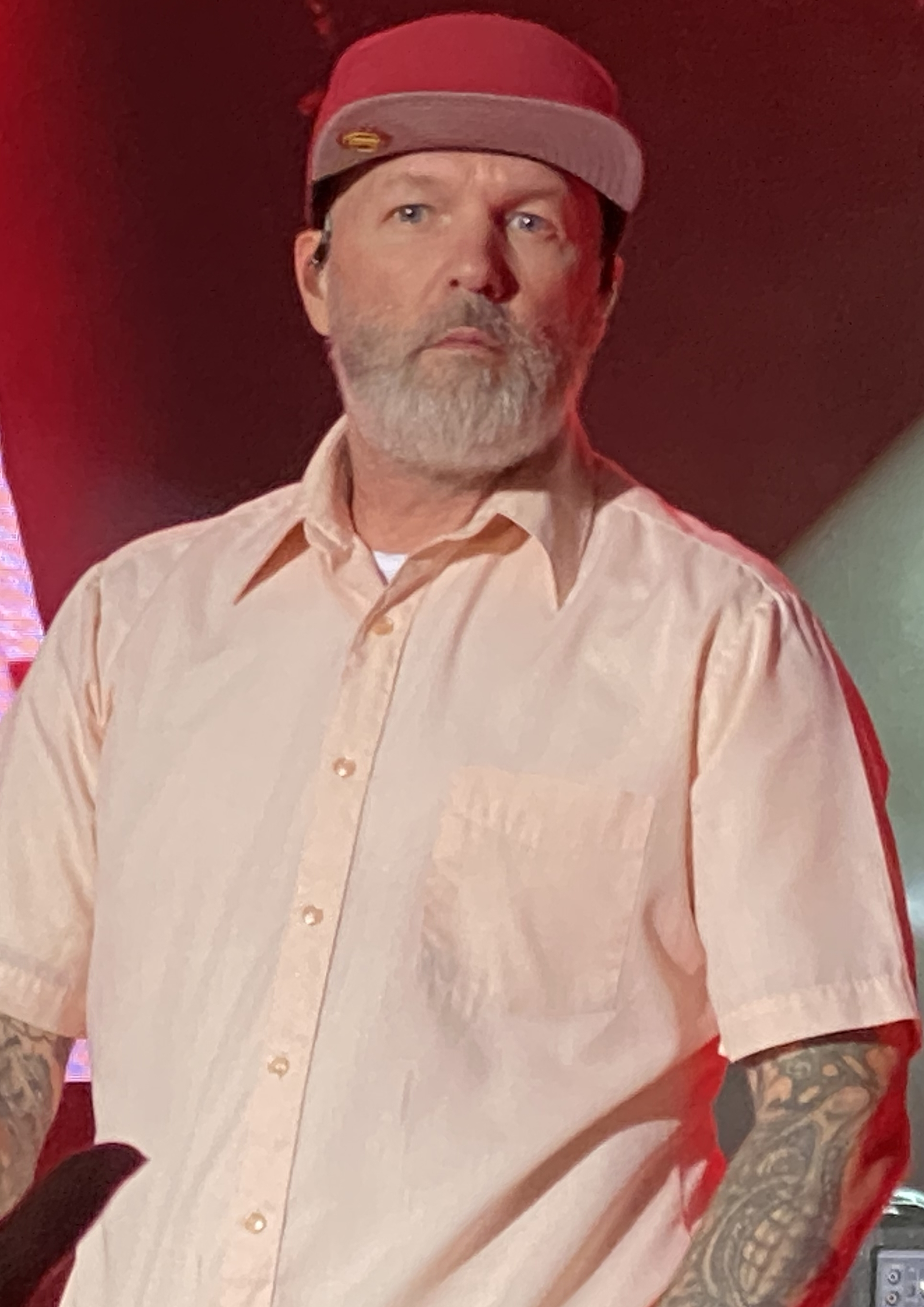
- Durst in 2021

Background information
- Also known as: William Frederick Durst
- Born: Frederick Allen Mayne III; August 20, 1970 (age 56); Jacksonville, Florida, U.S.
- Origin: North Carolina, U.S.
- Genres: Nu metal; rap rock; rap metal
- Occupations: Rapper; singer; songwriter; film director; actor
- Instruments: Vocals; guitar
- Years active: 1990–present
- Member of: Limp Bizkit
- Spouses: Rachel Tergesen (m. 1990; div. 1993) Esther Nazarov (m. 2009; div. 2009) Kseniya Beryazina (m. 2012; div. 2019) Arles (m. 2022)
- Website: freddurst.com

William Frederick Durst (born Frederick Allen Mayne III; August 20, 1970) is an American rapper, singer, songwriter, film director, and actor. He is the frontman and lyricist of the nu metal band Limp Bizkit, formed in 1994, with whom he has released six studio albums.

== Early life ==
Durst was born Frederick Allen Mayne III in Jacksonville, Florida, but soon moved to Orlando, and then to a farm in Cherryville, North Carolina, at one year old. His mother, Anita, renamed him William Frederick Durst after remarrying Bill Durst, a local police officer. Shortly after, Durst's mother and stepfather had a child, his half-brother, Cory Durst. In the fifth grade, Fred Durst moved to Gastonia, North Carolina, where he graduated from Hunter Huss High School. As a child, Durst was bullied, a theme that he incorporated into his music. At the age of 12, Durst took an interest in breakdancing, hip-hop, punk rock, and heavy metal. He began to rap, skate, beatbox, and DJ. After serving in the Navy for two years, Durst moved back to Jacksonville with his father, where he worked as a landscaper and a tattoo artist while developing an idea for a band that combined elements of rock and hip-hop.

== Career ==
=== Formation of Limp Bizkit (1994–1999) ===
In 1994, Durst, Malachi Sage bassist Sam Rivers, and Rivers's high school friend John Otto jammed together and wrote three songs. Guitarist Wes Borland later joined. Durst named the band "Limp Bizkit" because he wanted a name that would repel casual listeners. Limp Bizkit developed a cult following in the underground music scene when its covers of George Michael's "Faith" and Paula Abdul's "Straight Up" began to attract curious concertgoers.

Later, when Korn performed in town as the opening act for Sick of It All, Durst invited Korn to his house. He was able to persuade bassist Reginald Arvizu to listen to demos of the songs "Pollution," "Counterfeit," and "Stalemate." Korn added a then-unsigned Limp Bizkit to two tours, which gave the latter a new audience. DJ Lethal, formerly of the hip-hop group House of Pain, joined the band as a turntablist. During this time, Durst's disagreements with Borland led the guitarist to briefly leave the band, but Borland rejoined soon after.

In 1997, Limp Bizkit signed with Flip Records, a subsidiary of Interscope Records, and released its debut album, Three Dollar Bill, Y'all to moderate response. On October 23, 1997, Durst met the band Staind, but friction quickly emerged between the two over the cover art of Staind's album. Durst unsuccessfully attempted to remove Staind from a concert bill shortly before the latter's performance, but after hearing the band play, he was so impressed that he apologized and signed the band to Flip/Elektra, recorded a demo with the band, and co-produced its next album, Dysfunction.

After Limp Bizkit finished a tour with the band Deftones, Durst and DJ Lethal were asked by Max Cavalera, formerly of the band Sepultura, to appear on "Bleed," a song from the self-titled debut of his new band Soulfly. Cavalera stated that producer Ross Robinson recommended that he work with Durst. Durst also made an appearance on Korn's album Follow the Leader. Jonathan Davis had intended to write a battle rap with B-Real of Cypress Hill, but the latter's label would not let him do it, and Durst was tapped instead. Davis and Durst wrote the lyrics for "All in the Family," which featured the two vocalists trading insults. Davis and Durst would often offer suggestions for each other's lyrics; a lyric written by Durst as "tootin' on your bagpipe" was changed to "fagpipes" by Davis, who stated, "I helped him bag on me better".

Having always been interested in camera and video technology, some of which originated in his skating days, Durst began to take an interest in filmmaking, directing the music video for Limp Bizkit's single "Faith" in promotion for its appearance in the film Very Bad Things; he was unsatisfied with it and made a second video that paid tribute to tourmates Primus, Deftones, and Mötley Crüe, bands that appeared in the video.

=== Mainstream success (1998–2005) ===
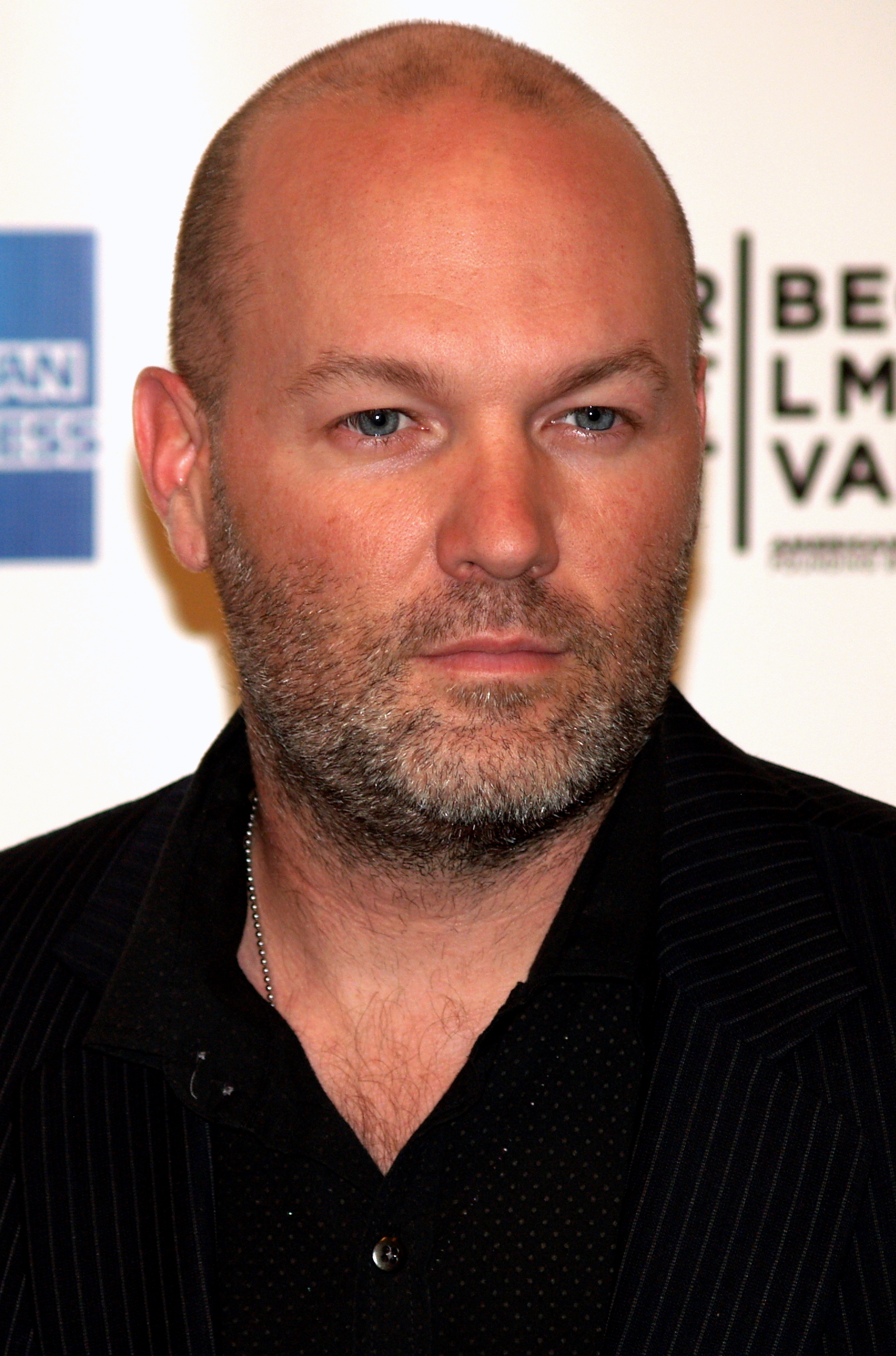
Durst at the premiere of Baby Mama at the 2008 Tribeca Film Festival

Limp Bizkit achieved mainstream success with the albums Significant Other (1999) and Chocolate Starfish and the Hot Dog Flavored Water (2000). In June 1999, Durst was appointed Senior Vice President of A&R at Interscope. Durst utilized his connections through the label and scouted numerous bands, landing record deals for Cold, Staind, Puddle of Mudd, and She Wants Revenge. Durst would also aid in attracting other bands such as 30 Seconds to Mars and Taproot, though Durst would pass on 30 Seconds to Mars, and he later engaged in a minor feud with Taproot after it rejected his original offer to sign the group to Interscope in 1999.

In the summer of 1999, Limp Bizkit played at the highly anticipated Woodstock '99 festival in front of approximately 200,000 people. The concert was tarnished by violent behavior from the crowd, much of which occurred during and after Limp Bizkit's performance, including fans tearing plywood from the walls during the song "Break Stuff." Several sexual assaults were reported in the aftermath of the concert. Durst stated during the concert, "People are getting hurt. Don't let anybody get hurt. But I don't think you should mellow out. That's what Alanis Morissette had you motherfuckers do. If someone falls, pick 'em up. We already let the negative energy out. Now we wanna let out the positive energy." Durst later stated in an interview, "I didn't see anybody getting hurt. You don't see that. When you're looking out on a sea of people and the stage is twenty feet in the air and you're performing, and you're feeling your music, how do they expect us to see something bad going on?" Les Claypool told the San Francisco Examiner, "Woodstock was just Durst being Durst. His attitude is 'no press is bad press,' so he brings it on himself. He wallows in it. Still, he's a great guy." "It's easy to point the finger and blame [us], but they hired us for what we do —— and all we did is what we do. I would turn the finger and point it back to the people that hired us," Durst said, in reference to Woodstock co-founder Michael Lang.

In June 2000, Limp Bizkit's tour was sponsored by the controversial file sharing service Napster. Durst was an outspoken advocate of file sharing. During the 2000 MTV Video Music Awards, Durst performed Limp Bizkit's song "Livin' It Up" as a duet with Christina Aguilera. In response to the performance, Filter frontman Richard Patrick claimed that "Fred getting onstage with Christina Aguilera embarrassed us all." In response to the negative reactions to the performance, Durst remarked, "People always just wanna talk about Britney or Christina. What's the problem? Because they make a type of music we aren't allowed to like? Or you think they are the nemesis of what our music is about? Why segregate? Why be so musically fuckin' racist? What do you mean, I can't hang out with these types of people? Clearly I didn't give a fuck, which fed a lot of it, too. I mean, someone that's not going to give in and [apologize...it's] gonna make people carry on talking."

During a 2001 tour of Australia at the Big Day Out festival in Sydney, fans rushed the stage in the mosh pit, and teenager Jessica Michalik died of asphyxiation. In Auckland, New Zealand, on the same tour, Durst threw water over the head of a security personnel tasked with defusing a similar situation. During the Big Day Out crush, Durst has been accused of taunting security guards intervening in the situation. In court, Durst, represented by his long-time attorney, Ed McPherson, testified he had warned the concert's organizers Aaron Jackson, Will Pearce and Amar Tailor and promoter Vivian Lees of the potential dangers of such minimal security. After viewing video and hearing witness testimony, the coroner said it was evident that the density of the crowd was dangerous at the time Limp Bizkit took the stage and Durst should have acted more responsibly when the problem became apparent. Durst stated that he was "emotionally scarred" because of the teenager's death.

In 2002, Durst was tapped to write songs for Britney Spears and later said that he was in a relationship with her. Spears denied Durst's claims. In a 2009 interview, he explained that "I just guess, at the time, it was taboo for a guy like me to be associated with a gal like her." In February 2005, a sex tape featuring Durst was released on the Internet. Durst filed a $70 million lawsuit against ten websites that posted the video.

In May 2003, it was reported that Durst was working on a New Wave side project alongside Limp Bizkit's Results May Vary album. The band, named Pacifica, was reportedly in its "very early stages" and had a sound reminiscent of Duran Duran and Soft Cell. News about the band stopped quickly and no releases ever surfaced.

In May 2005, The Unquestionable Truth (Part 1) was released. Sammy Siegler took over drumming duties for the band for much of the album. At Durst's insistence, the album was released as an underground album, without any advertising or promotion. The album sold over 2,000,000 copies worldwide, peaking at number 24 on the Billboard 200. Durst later announced that despite the album's title, no sequel to The Unquestionable Truth would be produced. Later in the year, the band released a Greatest Hitz album.

Having been bullied while growing up, Durst disliked seeing people "using my music as fuel to torture other people"; feeling that his music was being misinterpreted, he would later cite this as the reason for the band taking a hiatus.

Durst also said that he created a character for his music, but that he was also misunderstood by the public: "I always knew the guy in the red cap was not me. I'm Dr Frankenstein, and that's my creature. Being a breakdancer, a graffiti artist, a tattoo artist, and liking rock and hip hop was too much; it was a conscious effort to create Fred Durst, and eventually I had to bring that guy out more than I wanted to. It took on a life of its own. I had to check into that character —— the gorilla, the thing, the red-cap guy. It's a painful transformation, but I do it ['cause] that's what I was taught to do when you have people pulling at you."

=== Start of film career (2006–2009) ===
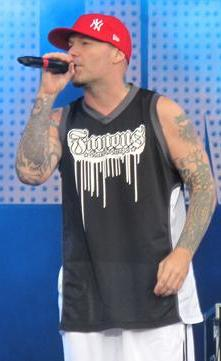
Durst with Limp Bizkit at Sonisphere 2011

While Limp Bizkit was on hiatus, Durst began working in independent films. In 2006, Durst costarred in the film Population 436. His directorial debut, The Education of Charlie Banks, was released the following year. The film, which starred Jesse Eisenberg, Chris Marquette, and Jason Ritter, received mixed reviews; Rotten Tomatoes gave the film a score of 48% based on reviews from 31 critics. The website's consensus stated, "Unevenness and earnestness mire this otherwise sweet, surprising [coming-of-age] drama." A second directorial effort, The Longshots, starring Ice Cube and Keke Palmer, was released in 2008. Rotten Tomatoes gave the film a score of 41% based on 71 reviews, with the site's consensus indicating that the film was "a largely formulaic affair, rarely deviating from the inspirational sports movie playbook." The same year, Durst appeared as a bartender in two episodes of the television medical drama House, M.D.

=== Limp Bizkit reunion (2009–present) ===
In 2009, the original lineup of Limp Bizkit reunited and began touring. Durst announced that the band had begun to record a new album, Gold Cobra. The album was released on June 28, 2011, receiving mixed reviews. It peaked at number 16 on the Billboard 200.

In 2012, Durst appeared on the Insane Clown Posse cover album Smothered, Covered & Chunked on a cover of AMG's "Bitch Betta Have My Money". In February 2012, Lil Wayne announced in a radio interview that Limp Bizkit had signed to his label, Cash Money Records, which Durst confirmed on his Twitter page. A few months later, Durst was featured alongside Lil Wayne and Birdman on the Kevin Rudolf song "Champions," which peaked in the top 10 on iTunes.

Originally, Durst was to direct and produce the film Pawn Shop Chronicles, starring Paul Walker; but Wayne Kramer was later chosen to direct the film. In 2014, Durst shot three commercials for the website eHarmony, In February 2018, Durst began filming The Fanatic, starring John Travolta.

=== Possible political aspirations (2026–present) ===
On November 7, 2026, 4 days after the 2026 United States elections, Durst created a second Instagram account with the handle @votedurst and subsequently posted a reel saying "Well... Just when you thought things couldn't get any worse. It's time to vote Durst. I wanna get to the bottom of all this bullshit. I'm runnin'." Durst is not known to have filed any paperwork to seek public office yet, nor has he specified what office he is seeking or when, but many fans speculate that he is planning to run for president in 2028.

== Personal life ==
=== Relationships and children ===
While serving in the Navy, Durst was stationed in Oakland, California, where he married his first wife, Rachel Tergesen, in 1990. They had a daughter. Durst and Tergesen divorced in 1993 following a domestic disturbance in which the couple engaged in a heated argument. Durst was later arrested and charged with disorderly conduct, receiving a fine of $5,000.

Durst has a son with his ex-girlfriend, actress Jennifer Thayer.

In 2009, Durst married Esther Nazarov, but they split up after three months. Durst married his third wife, make-up artist Kseniya Beryazina, in 2012. They filed for divorce in September 2018 and finalized it in 2019. Durst married again in 2022.

=== Arrests ===
On July 13, 1999, Durst was arrested for kicking a stage security guard in the head. Durst was released on $50,000 bail and was later fined in exchange for reduced charges.

In 2007, Durst pleaded no-contest to seven misdemeanor charges, including battery, assault, and reckless driving. According to court documents, Durst hit two Los Angeles residents with his car on October 25, 2006. He was given a 120-day suspended sentence, 20 hours' community service, and a $1,500 fine.

=== Russia ===
In 2015, Durst stated his interest in obtaining a Russian passport and spending half of the year in Crimea. On October 8, 2015, the Russian newspaper Izvestia reported that Durst responded positively to Sergey Aksyonov's call to settle in Crimea. He wrote a letter stating that Vladimir Putin is "a great guy with clear moral principles and a nice person." Additionally, at a concert during the 'Money Sucks Tour' in Voronezh, Russia, he picked up a flag thrown on stage with an anti-Ukrainian slogan on it. Because of these controversies, he was banned by the Security Service of Ukraine from entering Ukraine for five years starting in November 2015 "in the interests of guaranteeing the security" of the country. In an official statement, Durst denied reports of asking to acquire Russian citizenship.

In November 2025, a Limp Bizkit concert in Tallinn set for May 2026 was canceled due to Durst's Russia comments. Estonian Minister of Foreign Affairs Margus Tsahkna stated that those supportive of Russia, especially following the 2022 invasion of Ukraine, had "no place on Estonian stages." The show's organizer pointed out the band performs in pro-Ukrainian countries and that Durst never spoke in favor of the invasion, while his previous comments were presumably due to "living in a distorted information bubble" at the time.

== Feuds ==
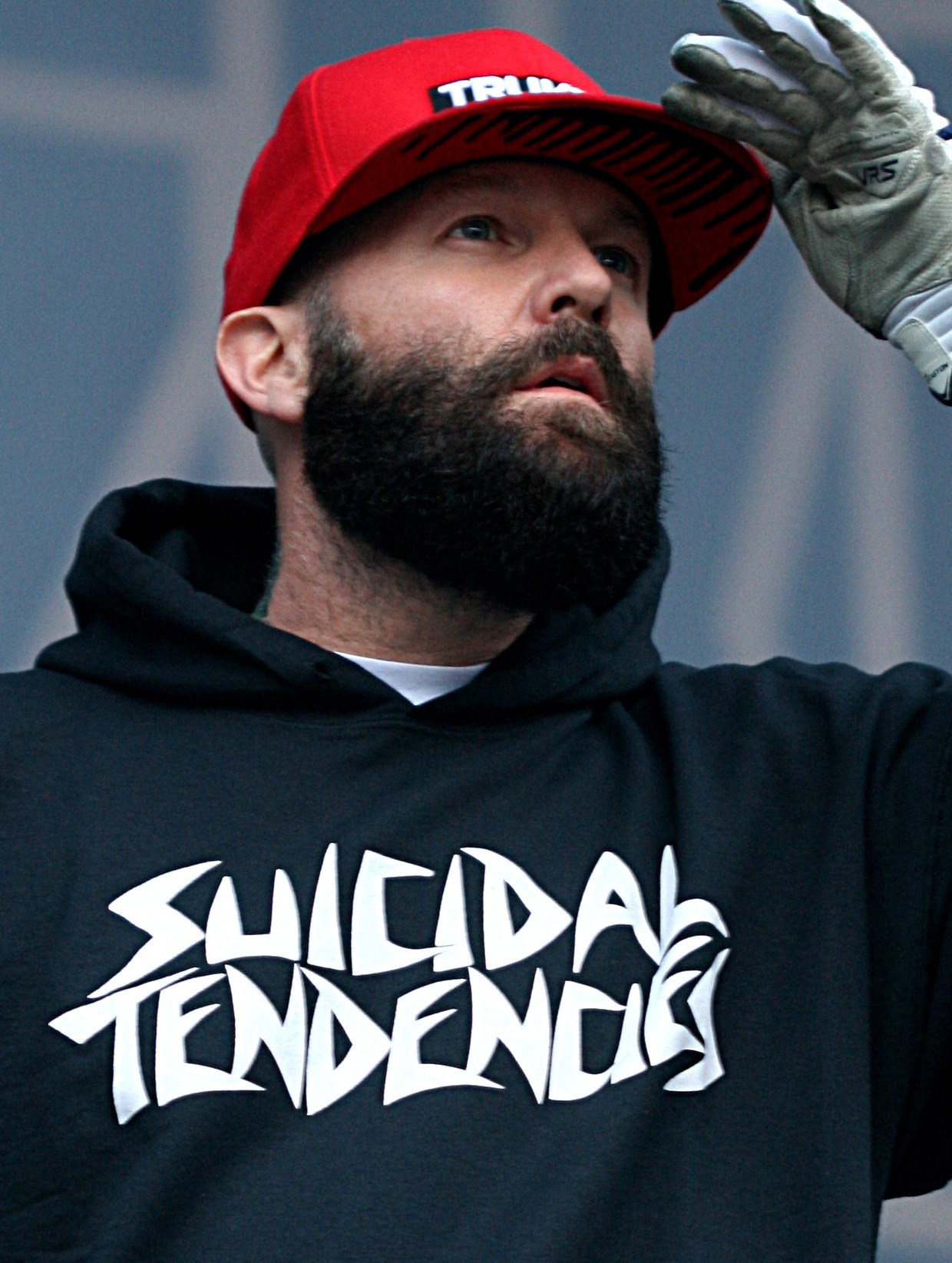
Durst performing in 2013

=== Slipknot ===
Following Slipknot lead vocalist Corey Taylor's publicly displayed distaste for Korn drummer David Silveria's magazine photo campaign for Calvin Klein, Taylor burned copies of the magazine issues during multiple Slipknot live performances, culminating in Durst taking offense to the gestures. Slipknot singer Corey Taylor responded during a February 2000 appearance in Sydney by claiming that the fans of Slipknot "for the most part, enjoy all kinds of music, like Limp Bizkit…maybe." Taylor went on to claim that insulting fans of Slipknot could also be insulting fans of Limp Bizkit. During an interview with VH1 in October 2000, Durst praised Slipknot's music, expressing his desire to quell the tension. However, while Taylor responded with praise for Durst's financial ventures, he also attacked Durst's artistic motives and ability, claiming "Fred Durst is a great businessman, but he is not an artist". Despite the hostility between the two bands, they both shared numerous UK festival dates in 2000, with some reports of Durst supporting Slipknot's music.

The two found themselves on friendlier terms in 2010, while Limp Bizkit was recording their album Gold Cobra; Durst included lyrics on the album's song "90.2.10" as a shout-out to Taylor: "Corey Taylor got a harem chasin' him around / We ain't slippin' with his knot, then we goin' down". Taylor stated in a live interview in 2011 that Durst's children were allegedly fans of Slipknot. Limp Bizkit was later booked on the 2014 Japanese leg of Slipknot's Knotfest tour, along with Korn.

=== Taproot and System of a Down ===
Taproot had been an up-and-coming band from Ann Arbor, Michigan. In 1998, the band sent their demo to Durst who quickly befriended them, often invited them to various press releases in Los Angeles and occasionally bringing them to Limp Bizkit's concerts throughout the region. During this time, Taproot were simultaneously receiving attention from other labels, notably Arista Records and Atlantic Records. Durst was impressed with the band's material and had initially lined up Taproot to land a record contract through Interscope; however, executives from Interscope proved to be difficult to negotiate with as they wanted the rights to the 3 songs recorded by the band through their demo deal. The band eventually rejected the offer from Interscope and sought to sign with Atlantic Records through their new found friendship with System of a Down. Durst was enraged to eventually discover Taproot had defected to Atlantic, leading him to leave a threatening message on frontman Stephen Richards' mother's answering machine. Durst was later alleged to have personally removed System of a Down from the 1999 Family Values Tour as a retaliatory action.

=== Creed ===
In June 2000, Limp Bizkit performed at the WXRK Dysfunctional Family Picnic in Holmdel, New Jersey, but arrived an hour late for their set. An Interscope spokesman later stated that there was confusion over the band's set time. During the band's performance, Durst criticized Creed and their lead singer Scott Stapp in a lengthy diatribe before the performance of 'Break Stuff', calling him "an egomaniac". Creed's representatives later presented Durst with an autographed anger management manual following the show, as described by Durst during an appearance on Total Request Live.

=== Placebo ===
A feud between Limp Bizkit and Placebo began at a show Durst was hosting at Irving Plaza in December 1998. A side stage spat with Placebo singer Brian Molko led to Durst asking the crowd to chant "Placebo sucks!" prior to Placebo's performance. Molko later commented that nobody had told him that Durst would be hosting the show and that Placebo would have to follow opening act Kid Rock. Prior to introducing Staind as a part of K-Rock's Dysfunctional Family Picnic in Holmdel, New Jersey in 1999, Durst once again encouraged the crowd to chant "Fuck Placebo". The feud was reignited during Big Day Out 2001, on which Placebo were billed below Limp Bizkit. By 2004, the feud had supposedly ended.

=== Trent Reznor and Marilyn Manson ===
Trent Reznor of Nine Inch Nails was noted by Durst as an influence during several interviews. Displeased by Durst's statements, Reznor repeatedly attacked Durst and Limp Bizkit during several interviews in response. In a profile for Kerrang!, Reznor mocked Durst saying "It's one thing if you know your place; like, 'Hey, I'm an idiot who plays shitty music but people buy it – fuck it, I'm having fun. But it's another thing when you think you're David Bowie after you've stayed up all night to write a song called 'Break Stuff'. I mean, Fred Durst probably spelt the word 'break' wrong the first couple of times. Fred Durst might be a cool guy; I don't know him. But his 'art' – in the word's loosest sense – sucks." Durst in turn made several references to Nine Inch Nails in the Limp Bizkit song "Hot Dog", leading to Reznor earning a co-writer credit. Reznor said there was no issue, jokingly stating that "When his record was going to print, [Durst] realised 'Fuck, I'd better ask permission first or I might get sued!' I let him do it – I wasn't gonna hold his record up."

In 1999, Marilyn Manson insulted Limp Bizkit and their fans, calling them "illiterate apes that beat your ass in high school for being a 'fag' and now sell you tuneless testosterone anthems of misogyny and pretend to be outsiders...".

Reznor and Manson once again took aim at Durst and Limp Bizkit during a 2000 interview when Manson was asked about his opinion of Nine Inch Nails' recent video for the single "Starfuckers, Inc." in which the two take aim at multiple artists ranging from Billy Corgan, Michael Stipe, and notably Durst. Manson later exclaimed: "With this video, we didn't wanna seem bitching like about somehow that Limp Bizkit's doing better than we are, in their mind." Reznor later exclaimed; "I don't have to say Limp Bizkit sucks, you know it, I know it, I shouldn't have to say it".

Durst responded to Manson and Reznor's insults: "I understand that Marilyn Manson is very unhappy that his career has gone in a shambles and he's alienated his fans so if he has to say things like that because he's very mad at himself, I would forgive him. And Trent Reznor's in the fucking same boat. Trent Reznor is obviously unhappy with how he's alienated the world, how long he took to make a record, and how he thought he was immortal. We're just here doing what we do and we have nothing to say about anybody. I wish them both luck and I feel sorry that they're so jealous and mad at themselves that they have to talk shit."

Durst's relationship with Manson had reportedly grown cordial as the two appeared on the cover of a Rolling Stone magazine issue in June 2003 alongside James Hetfield and Ozzy Osbourne.

Despite this, Limp Bizkit guitarist Wes Borland would join Manson's touring band in 2008. During a show in Seoul, South Korea on August 15, 2008; Manson would introduce Borland onstage and attacked Limp Bizkit, claiming to the crowd "Here's our new guitarist, he used to play for a really bad band…". Borland would depart Manson's touring band after less than nine months.

=== Puddle of Mudd ===
Due to the notoriety surrounding Puddle of Mudd receiving a record deal through Durst in 2000, the band was often asked in regards to their relationship with him. Wes Scantlin criticized Durst in an interview in 2004 with Canada's Chart magazine:

"He doesn't write our songs, he doesn't produce our songs, he doesn't do anything for us. He doesn't do our videos anymore. He doesn't do anything for this band. I don't know what he's doing, I don't know what the guy's like. All I know is that he's like Mr Hollywood guy, Mr Celebrity. Like, 'I don't hang out with anybody except Hollywood celebrities'. Every single fucking interview I've ever fucking done, I get asked about that fucking guy... And for me to do interviews all the time and be asked about this certain individual... People think he writes music with me or something. He does not do that. I just don't get it. We have nothing in common. He doesn't even call us, he has his assistant call us to congratulate us on our record. Yeah, that's how pathetic he is."

On April 22, 2008, in an interview with Artisan News Service, Wes Scantlin retracted his previous criticism of Fred Durst:

"Fred got our foot in the door and helped us out tremendously. I think nowadays he's doing a lot of directing and we don't really speak to him too much but we appreciate everything he's ever done for our careers."

=== Mancow Muller ===
Metal Injection reported that in July 2003, there was a feud between Durst and Chicago-based radio host Mancow Muller. Limp Bizkit was booed off stage after only having played for seventeen minutes prior to Metallica's set at Hawthorne Race Course in Chicago while participating in the Summer Sanitarium Tour. With the crowd chanting "Fuck Fred Durst" and pelting the stage with garbage, Durst erupted after six songs, yelled homophobic slurs, threw the microphone down, and walked off stage. Chicago Sun-Times stated that Durst "self-destructed" in that moment. The incident delayed Metallica's set by 90 minutes. It was learned that in the days prior to the performance, Muller had been publicly criticizing Durst and Limp Bizkit's image and marketing strategies, calling them a "manufactured band" and "a fake deal", akin to the Monkees. He reportedly goaded concertgoers to throw makeshift projectiles such as coins at the band while they were performing. The band faced a class action lawsuit on behalf of the thousands of attendees on grounds of breach of contract for not completing the show.

== Discography ==
List of singles, with selected chart positions, showing year released and album name
Title	Year	Peak chart positions							Album
Title	Year	FIN	UK	US Alternative Digital	US Hard Rock	US Hard Rock Digital	US Main.	US Rock Digital	Album
"All in the Family" (Korn featuring Fred Durst)	1998	—	—	—	—	—	—	—	Follow the Leader
"Go Away" (Cold featuring Fred Durst)	1998	—	91	—	—	—	—	—	Cold
"Bleed" (Soulfly featuring Fred Durst and DJ Lethal)	1998	8	88	—	—	—	—	—	Soulfly
"Get Naked" (Methods of Mayhem featuring Fred Durst, Lil' Kim, Mixmaster Mike, and George Clinton)	1999	—	—	—	—	—	—	—	Methods of Mayhem
"Them Girls" (Run-D.M.C. featuring Fred Durst)	2001	—	—	—	—	—	—	—	Crown Royal
"Famous" (Rock featuring Fred Durst)	2004	—	—	—	—	—	—	—	Veteranz Day – The Best of Rock Volume 2
"Here We Are (Champions)" (Kevin Rudolf featuring Limp Bizkit, Birdman and Lil Wayne)	2013	—	—	—	—	—	—	—	Rich Gang
"Seamless" (Corey Feldman featuring Fred Durst)	2016	—	—	—	—	—	—	—	Angelic 2 the Core
"Bang Ya Head" (Wargasm featuring Fred Durst)	2023	—	—	—	—	—	—	—	Venom
"So raus" (Alligatoah featuring Fred Durst)	2023	—	—	—	—	—	—	—	Off
"Soul4Sale" Hardy (singer) featuring Fred Durst)	2024	–	–	–	–	14	–	–	Quit!!
"Fix Ur Face" (MGK featuring Fred Durst)	2026	—	—	2	1	1	22	3	Non-album single
"Come Say Sum" (Lauren Sanderson featuring Fred Durst)	2026	—	—	—	13	—	—	—	Lauren
"—" denotes a recording that did not chart or was not released in that territory.

== Filmography ==
Key
†	Denotes films that have not yet been released

List of films and TV shows appeared in
Year	Title	Role	Notes
2001	Zoolander	Himself	
2003	Pauly Shore is Dead	Himself	
2005	Revelations	Ogden	TV miniseries
2005	Sorry, Haters	Evan Jealous	
2006	Population 436	Deputy Bobby Caine	
2008	House M.D.	Bartender	Episode: "House's Head"; Episode: "Wilson's Heart"
2009	Play Dead	Ledge	
2018	Mostly 4 Millennials	DJ Durst	Recurring character
2023	The Lost Century: And How to Reclaim It	Narrator	Documentary
2024	I Saw the TV Glow	Frank	
2024	Y2K	Himself	
2025	Hello Neighbor: Welcome To Raven Brooks	Quentin	Voice Only

List of films and commercials directed
Title	Year
The Education of Charlie Banks	2007
The Longshots	2008
EHarmony	2014
The Fanatic	2019

Video games
Year	Title	Role	Notes	Ref.
2001	WWF SmackDown! Just Bring It	Himself	Playable character	
2002	WWF Raw	Himself	Playable character	
2004	Fight Club	Himself	Playable character	

== Awards and nominations ==
Year	Award	Category	Work	Result	Ref.
2020	Golden Raspberry Awards	Worst Director	The Fanatic	Nominated	
