= List of Korn member solo projects =

Most of the members of the nu metal band Korn have their own solo projects of various genres.

== Fear and the Nervous System ==
Fear and the Nervous System is an experimental, industrial rock band formed by Munky in 2008.

Members

- James Christian Shaffer – guitars, vocals, production

Other contributors

- Billy Gould – bass
- Zac Baird – keyboards, programming
- Leopold Ross – programming, guitars, production
- Brooks Wackerman – drums, percussion

== Fieldy ==
Fieldy released the album Bassically on November 17, 2017. He stated in an interview that the album is jazz funk fusion, completely instrumental and "nothing like Korn". "A Song for Chi", an instrumental collaboration between various rock and metal musicians, was released under Fieldy's name in August 2009.

== Fieldy's Dreams ==
Fieldy's Dreams is a rap project by Fieldy. The album Rock'n Roll Gangster was released on January 22, 2002, featuring the single "Are You Talking to Me".

== Head ==
Despite some controversy and a lengthy departure from Korn, Head has recorded his own solo album entitled Save Me from Myself. It was released back in 2008, three years after his departure from the band. "Flush" and "Re-Bel" were released as singles. In February 2012, Welch announced that he was re-branding his solo project Love And Death.

== JDevil ==
JDevil (also J Devil) (Jonathan Davis of Korn and Jonathan Davis and the SFA fame) is the EDM (electronic dance music) producer, DJ alter ego of Jonathan Davis.

== Jonathan Davis and the SFA ==
Jonathan Davis and the SFA is an experimental rock project formed by Jonathan Davis in 2007. Jonathan wanted to do a solo tour ever since he wrote the songs for the 2002 film, Queen of the Damned, he was finally able to do so which in turn formed this project.

Members

- Jonathan Davis – vocals, multi-instruments
- Shenkar – vocals, double-violin
- Wes Borland – guitars
- Miles Mosley – upright bass
- Zac Baird – keyboards
- Ray Luzier – drums, percussion

== Killbot ==
Killbot is an American electronic dance music trio formed in January 2012. The lineup includes JDevil (Jonathan Davis producer, DJ alter ego), Tyler Blue, and Sluggo (Nick Suddarth).

== Sexual Gyrations of the Universe ==
Sexual Gyrations of the Universe is Jonathan Davis and Korn back-up vocalist Kalen Chase's side project. Jonathan previewed some songs from the project on his live webcast off of his official website. Working titles include "Anal Butterfly" and "Gay-Sex". It is currently unknown if anything from this project will be released to the public.

Members

- Jonathan Davis - vocals, multi-instruments
- Kalen Chase - vocals, multi-instruments

== StillWell ==
StillWell is a rapcore collaboration between rapper Q-Unique and Fieldy formed in early 2006. They put out their first single, "Killing Myself to Live", in October 2007. StillWell's first album Dirtbag was released on May 10, 2011.

Members

- Q-Unique – vocals
- Fieldy – guitars, production
- Sleeve – guitars
- Chiva – bass
- Wuv – drums
