= Meltdown (Love and Death song) =

Single by Love and Death

from the album Between Here & Lost
- Released: August 12, 2013
- Genre: Nu metal
- Length: 4:06
- Label: Tooth & Nail
- Songwriter(s): Stephen Aiello, Joshua E. Baker, Mark Holman, Jasen Rauch, Joseph Rickard, Brian Welch
- Producer(s): Lucas Bryce; Robby Starbuck

Love and Death singles chronology
| "The Abandoning" (2012) | "Meltdown" (2013) | "Lo Lamento" (2016) |

"Meltdown" is the third single from Between Here & Lost, the debut studio album from heavy metal band Love and Death. The song (along with "The Abandoning") is to be remixed by Jasen Rauch in preparation for the September 24, 2013 re-release of Between Here & Lost as a "deluxe" edition containing a new song entitled "Empty". The song peaked at No. 14 on US Christ Rock, with a music video of the song released on August 12, 2013.

== Premise ==
The composition is described as being a powerful song that delves into realistic subjects past normal auto-determined masochism such as intense depleting pain, the loss of those close and topics related to one's mental stability.

== Reviews ==
Rock Revolt Magazine describes the song as one that shifts quickly between a light melody and a heavy chorus, and that as soon as one is in tune with the song, the hook hits the person in the face like a ton of bricks.

== Video ==
The video was directed by Behn Fannin, with behind the scenes footage for the music video posted on August 3, 2013.

The video begins with the four band members putting on uniforms with nametags/beaver caps, blowing up a balloon and tearing off ribbon. The four of them then waltz in followed by Brian Welch flipping the "Come in WE'RE OPEN" sign around. A group of children then storm through the double doors with one child appearing to step on Welch's foot.

The children then start throwing chips and toys at the band members. One member is hit in the head with a large rubber ball, causing him to lose control of the tray and spill several drinks on his chest. After Welch and JR Bareis finish serving pizza, Welch is hit in the abdomen with a bat while trying to hang a piñata. The piñata subsequently falls on the floor with Welch staring on in astonishment at the children digging into the candy. Bareis then prepares to take a photograph of a child continuously punching a man in a Buck E. Beaver costume. As Welch starts to remove his beaver cap, the manager instructs him to put it back on.

Buck E. Beaver is then pushed to the ground and tormented by the children as he walks through the room. A child then sticks his leg out to trip Johnson who falls face first into the cake that he was carrying. As the children laugh, Johnson becomes angry at the child who trips him, but is stared down and pointed at by the manager. The manager calls Johnson over to scold him, making him frustrated.

Two children then squirt ketchup and mustard on Bareis while two more children squirt Welch with water pistols. The band then performs their song (with Johnson on a child's drum kit); the song becomes too much for the manager and kids to handle, but the kids applaud the performance at the end anyway.

== Personnel ==
(Source Discogs.com)

Love and Death

- Brian 'Head' Welch – vocals, rhythm guitar
- JR Bareis - lead guitar, backing vocals
- Michael Valentine - bass guitar, backing vocals
- Dan Johnson - drums

production personnel

- Jasen Rauch - producer
- Paul Pavao - mixer
- Ben Grosse - mixing consultant
- Buckley Miller - Engineer

== Chart performance ==
| Chart (2013) | Peak position |
|---|---|
| US Christian Rock (Billboard) | 14 |
