= Save Me from Myself (disambiguation) =

Save Me from Myself is an autobiography by Brian "Head" Welch.

Save Me from Myself may also refer to:

== Music ==
=== Albums ===
- Save Me from Myself (album), an album by Brian "Head" Welch, and the title song

=== Songs ===
- "Save Me from Myself", a song by Brian "Head" Welch from the album of the same name
- "Save Me from Myself", a song by Carpark North from Grateful
- "Save Me from Myself", a song by Christina Aguilera from Back to Basics
- "Save Me from Myself", a song by FFS from the self-titled album
- "Save Me from Myself", a song by Gregg Alexander from Michigan Rain
- "Save Me from Myself", a song by Michael Hutchence from the self-titled album
- "Save Me from Myself", a song by Michael W. Smith from Wonder
- "Save Me from Myself", a song by rock band Orange Goblin from the album A Eulogy for the Damned
- "Save Me from Myself", a song by Ray Stevens from Feel the Music
- "Save Me from Myself", a song by Sirenia from An Elixir for Existence
- "Save Me (From Myself)", a song by Steve Harley & Cockney Rebel from The Quality of Mercy
- "Save Me from Myself", a song by Tara Newley, 1994
- "Save Me from Myself", a song by Terry Ronald from Roma
- "Save Me from Myself", a song by Vertical Horizon from Burning the Days
- "Save Me from Myself (Encore)", a song by Hanson from Anthem

== Other ==
- Save Me from Myself, an NFT by Colombian singer-songwriter Shakira featured on the La Caldera collection

== See also ==
- Save Me (disambiguation)
