= Perfectly Preserved =

Studio album by Love and Death
- Released: February 12, 2021
- Studio: Off the Wall Studios
- Genre: Alternative metal; nu metal; Christian metal
- Length: 35:13
- Label: Earache
- Producer: Jasen Rauch; Joe Rickard

Love and Death chronology
Between Here & Lost (2013)	Perfectly Preserved (2021)

Singles from Perfectly Preserved
- 1. "Lo Lamento" Released: March 15, 2016; 2. "Down" Released: November 13, 2020; 3. "White Flag" Released: January 8, 2021; 4. "The Hunter" Released: February 5, 2021; 5. "Let Me Love You" Released: July 23, 2021

Perfectly Preserved is the second studio album by American Christian metal band Love and Death. The album was released on February 12, 2021, through Earache Records. This is the band's first album with current Breaking Benjamin and former Red guitarist Jasen Rauch on bass and Phinehas drummer Isaiah Perez.

== Background and release ==
Love and Death's debut album, Between Here & Lost, was released on January 22, 2013, through Tooth & Nail Records. Later that year Welch would rejoin his former band Korn and recorded his first album with that band in ten years, The Paradigm Shift. Love and Death would have sporadic activity over the next few years as Welch focused on his work with Korn. The band released the single "Lo Lamento" on March 15, 2016. Bassist Michael Valentine and drummer Dan Johnson would depart the band shortly after the single's release.

After the release of "Lo Lamento," Love and Death became inactive once again. In August 2019, Welch announced he was recruiting musicians such as Jasen Rauch and Lacey Sturm to appear on an album. The band announced on October 24, 2020, that it had signed with Earache Records and that a new album was planned to be released in 2021. The single "Down" was released on November 13, 2020, and introduced the band's new lineup. The song "White Flag" was released as a 3rd single on January 8, 2021. The song "The Hunter" was released as a 4th single on February 5, 2021.

Before the album's release, Welch stated that work on the album was able to move forward as the musicians' main projects were on hold due to the COVID-19 pandemic.

Perfectly Preserved was released on February 12, 2021.

== Reception ==
Professional ratings
Review scores
Source	Rating
Distorted Sound	7/10
Jesusfreakhideout.com	4/5 stars
Kerrang!	3/5
Metal Hammer	3.5/5 stars
Wall of Sound	9/10

Perfectly Preserved received generally positive reviews upon release.

Metal Hammer's Sophie Maughan praised JR Bareis's clean vocals, saying that they sound "a lot more confident this time" along with Welch's harsh vocals. Maughan also praised the band's ability to "incorporate personal beliefs amongst huge, punchy hooks and pummelling riffs without coming across as overly preachy."

Jesus Freak Hideout's Michael Weaver praised the album, highlighting JR Bareis's increased involvement on the album, calling it a "wise choice" and gives the album a more youthful perspective that makes it more accessible. He stated that the album's more accessible sound doesn't come off as a negative and feels like a logical progression from Between Here and Lost. Weaver also praised the cover of "Let Me Love You," calling it a "great melodic rock song." Wall of Sound's Ricky Aarons also praised the album, saying the album will "go down in history as something really special."

A more mixed review came from James Hickie of Kerrang!, who said the album is more of the same from the band and called the cover of "Let Me Love You" a "novelty blip." Hickie did praise the album's heavier moments and Welch's vocals.

In April 2021, the album was included on Metal Hammer's list of "The Top 20 Best Albums of 2021 so Far." Perfectly Preserved was selected as the seventh best alternative metal album of 2021 by Metal Hammer.

== Track listing ==
No.	Title	Writer(s)	Length
1.	"Infamy" (Instrumental)	Keith Wallen	1:53
2.	"Tragedy"	Brian "Head" Welch; Gary "JR" Bareis; Jasen Rauch; Joe Rickard; Wallen	3:38
3.	"Down"	B. Welch; Bareis; Rauch; Rickard; Wallen	4:02
4.	"Let Me Love You" (DJ Snake and Justin Bieber cover; featuring Lacey Sturm)	William Grigahcine; Justin Bieber; Andrew Watt; Ali Tamposi; Brian Lee; Louis Bell; Edwin Perez; Teddy Mendez; Lumidee Cedeno	3:54
5.	"Death of Us"	B. Welch; Bareis; Rauch; Rickard; Wallen	3:52
6.	"Slow Fire"	B. Welch; Bareis; Rauch; Wallen	3:31
7.	"The Hunter" (featuring Keith Wallen)	B. Welch; Bareis; Rauch; Wallen; Matthew Baird; Tom Hane	3:39
8.	"Lo Lamento"	B. Welch; Bareis; Rauch; Mark Holman	3:49
9.	"Affliction"	B. Welch; Bareis; Rauch; Wallen; Hane; Jennea Welch	3:17
10.	"White Flag" (featuring Ryan Hayes)	B. Welch; Bareis; Rauch; Ryan Hayes	3:55
Total length:			35:13

== Personnel ==
=== Love and Death ===
- Brian "Head" Welch – lead vocals, guitar
- Gary "JR" Bareis – guitar, backing vocals on "The Hunter", co-lead vocals (1–6, 8–10), programming
- Jasen Rauch – guitar, bass, programming
- Isaiah Perez – drums

=== Additional musicians ===
- Joe Rickard – programming
- Keith Wallen – lead vocals on "The Hunter", programming, additional vocals
- Tom Hane – programming
- Lacey Sturm – vocals on "Let Me Love You"
- Ryan Hayes – vocals on "White Flag"
- Jennea Welch – performing in "Slow Fire"

=== Production ===
- Jasen Rauch - producer, engineering
- Joe Rickard - producer, engineering, mixing
- Joshua Sturm - engineering
- Mike Warren - engineering
- Lester Estelle - drum engineering
- Paul DeCarli - digital editing
- Niels Nielson - mastering

=== Technical ===
- Kevin Moore (Mindreader) - Art Direction & Design
