= Chemicals (Love and Death song) =

2013 single by Love and Death

Single by Love and Death

from the album Between Here & Lost
- Released: January 22, 2013
- Genre: Nu metal; alternative metal
- Length: 3:55
- Label: Tooth & Nail
- Songwriter(s): Mark Holman, Jasen Rauch, Michael Valentine, Brian Welch
- Producer(s): Jasen Rauch

Love and Death singles chronology
"Paralyzed" (2011)	"Chemicals" (2013)	"The Abandoning" (2012)

"Chemicals" is the debut single from Love and Death ("Paralyzed" was released under the name 'Brian "Head" Welch'). The song is included on both Chemicals and Between Here & Lost, and was ranked No. 6 on the Billboard Hot Singles Sales chart.

== Premise ==
According to JesusFreakHideout, the song seems to talk about Welch's substance addiction. Welch states that the composition refers to battling depression, chemical warfare and the cage that is drug addiction.

== Reviews ==
Liz Ramanand of Loudwire describes the song as being one of the strongest songs on Between Here & Lost, in that it leans toward being melodic and is catchy with ear shattering guitar verses.

== Video ==
The video begins with lead vocalist Brian Welch running from a man in a black hooded sweatshirt wearing a grotesque mask. The video then switches between various scenes of the band members having ropes tied around their hands. Bassist Michael Valentine is then captured by the man in the mask and taken into the alley.

After Valentine is captured, guitarist JR Bareis is then seen running from the masked man. Dan Johnson is subsequently chased, tipping a trash container down to try to trip the masked man. Bareis, Johnson, Valentine and Welch are seen seated in a dark room tied about the hands. Four masked men then place masks on the faces of Bareis, Johnson, Valentine and Welch, symbolic of the latter four joining the ranks of the original masked men.

At the end of the video, Welch removes his mask, followed by the other band members being shown without their masks on. The members are then seen ripping holes in the wall of the graffiti covered room in which they played music during the video, allegorical of freeing themselves from the figurative cages surrounding them.

== Personnel ==
(Source Discogs.com)

Love and Death

- Brian 'Head' Welch – vocals, rhythm guitar
- JR Bareis - lead guitar, backing vocals
- Michael Valentine - bass guitar, backing vocals
- Dan Johnson - drums

production personnel

- Jasen Rauch - producer
- Paul Pavao - mixer
- Ben Grosse - mixing consultant
- Buckley Miller - Engineer

== Chart performance ==
Chart (2012)	Peak position
US Hot Singles Sales (Billboard)	6
US Christian Rock (Billboard)	4
