= The Abandoning =

Single by Love and Death

from the album Between Here & Lost
- Released: November 30, 2012
- Genre: Nu metal
- Length: 3:29
- Label: Tooth & Nail
- Songwriters: Joshua E. Baker, J.R. Bareis, Stacy Hogan, Joseph Rickard, Hunter Lamb, Brian Welch
- Producer: Jasen Rauch

Love and Death singles chronology
"Chemicals" (2012)	"The Abandoning" (2012)	"Meltdown" (2013)

"The Abandoning" is the second single from heavy metal band Love and Death from their debut studio album Between Here & Lost. The video was filmed on November 10, 2012 by Daniel Davison and was released on January 28, 2013. The song ranked No. 6 on the US Christian Rock chart.

== Song ==
The song emulates themes revolving around dedication to Christ, a confrontation with previous wrongdoings and contrition as well as a new confidence in the future.

== Video ==
The video begins with two people in white suits dragging two women into a room. The two people in white suits are then seen holding ropes about Brian Welch's neck with long posts while he sings. One of the women is seen on an exam table with an oxygen mask over her mouth, while the other woman is seated on a chair with her hands tied behind it with rope and her legs constrained together. Welch is then dragged while lying on the ground. The woman continues struggling to free herself, causing the chair to fall on its side and her being able to stand up, disabling the security camera and removing the mask from the other woman who was having convulsions. The video screen broadcasting the contents of the security camera then explodes, impacting the two people in white suits. The women, dressed in gowns, then run from the facility hand in hand, escaping their almost deadly fate.

== Reviews ==
Kevin Wierzbicki of antimusic describes the song as featuring "lots of the woozy guitar grind he helped popularize and a radio-ready vocal hook to boot"

== Personnel ==
(Source Discogs.com)

Love and Death

- Brian 'Head' Welch – vocals, rhythm guitar
- JR Bareis - lead guitar, backing vocals
- Michael Valentine - bass guitar, backing vocals
- Dan Johnson - drums

production personnel

- Jasen Rauch - producer
- Paul Pavao - mixer
- Ben Grosse - mixing consultant
- Buckley Miller - Engineer

== Chart performance ==
Chart (2012)	Peak position
US Christian Rock (Billboard)	6
