= Between Here & Lost =

Studio album by Love and Death
- Released: January 22, 2013
- Recorded: 2011–2012
- Studio: The Brown Owl Studios (Nashville, TN); Ronnie’s Place Studios (Nashville, TN); The Harker House
- Genre: Christian metal; nu metal; alternative metal
- Length: 42:29
- Label: Tooth & Nail
- Producer: Jasen Rauch

Love and Death chronology
Chemicals EP (2012)	Between Here & Lost (2013)	Perfectly Preserved (2021)

Singles from Between Here & Lost
- 1. "Paralyzed" Released: October 4, 2011; 2. "Chemicals" Released: May 6, 2012; 3. "The Abandoning" Released: November 30, 2012; 4. "Meltdown" Released: August 13, 2013

Professional ratings
Review scores
Source	Rating
About.com	4/5 stars
Christian Music Zine	4/5
Jesusfreakhideout.com	3.5/5 stars 4.5/5 stars
Loudwire	4/5 stars
New Release Tuesday	4.5/5 stars

Between Here & Lost is the debut studio album by American Christian metal band Love and Death. It was released January 22, 2013 through Tooth & Nail Records.

== History ==
An album was announced to be in progress with the official re-branding announcement of Welch's solo project in February 2012. The album's release was preceded by the EP Chemicals, which featured three songs from the forthcoming album, as well as two remixes. The band continued to record and tour throughout 2012, and in September they announced the release date for the album to be November 20. Shortly before the release date announcement, Welch stated that the band had just signed a deal with Tooth & Nail Records and EMI to release the album. Shortly before the release date, the label pushed the release back to January 22, 2013.

According to Welch, "this record was birthed from trials, tribulations, pain, suffering, anxiety, depression, and drama. However, we came out on top and the end result is a very real, raw & honest record." The band also revealed they would be touring in 2013 to support the album. An expanded edition was released on September 17, 2013, and features three bonus tracks.

== Track listing ==
All music is composed by Brian "Head" Welch and Love and Death (except where noted).

No.	Title	Music	Length
1.	"The Abandoning"		3:26
2.	"Whip It" (Devo cover)	Casele, Mothersbaugh	3:08
3.	"Watching the Bottom Fall"		3:37
4.	"By the Way..."		3:50
5.	"Meltdown"		4:06
6.	"My Disaster"		4:12
7.	"I W8 4 U" (featuring Mattie Montgomery of For Today)		4:31
8.	"Fading Away"		3:40
9.	"Paralyzed"	Welch, Jasen Rauch	3:42
10.	"Chemicals"	Welch, Rauch, Mark Holman, Michael Valentine	3:55
11.	"Bruises"		4:22
Total length:			42:29

Expanded edition bonus tracks
No.	Title	Length
12.	"Empty"	5:50
13.	"The Abandoning (Rauch Remix)"	4:18
14.	"Meltdown (Rauch Remix)"	3:27
Total length:		55:24

== Charts ==
List of singles, with selected chart positions, showing year released and album name
Title	Year	Peak chart positions	
Title	Year	US Sales	US Christ. Rock
"Chemicals"	2012	6	4
"The Abandoning"	2012	—	6
"Meltdown"	2013	—	14
"—" denotes a recording that did not chart or was not released in that territory.

== Personnel ==
Love and Death

- Brian "Head" Welch – lead vocals, rhythm guitar
- JR Bareis – lead guitar, backing vocals
- Michael Valentine – bass guitar, backing vocals
- Dan Johnson – drums

Additional musicians

- Matt Baird – vocals on "Whip It"
- Mattie Montgomery – vocals on "I W8 4 U"
- Joe Rickard – drums on "Paralyzed"
- Jasen Rauch – programming

Production Source Discogs.com

- Jasen Rauch – producing, engineering, mastering, remixing on tracks 13 and 14
- Paul Pavao – mixing (Tracks 1, 4–12)
- Ben Grosse – mixing (Tracks 2–3)
- Buckley Miller – drums engineering
