= Hater (song) =

Single by Korn

from the album The Paradigm Shift (World Tour Edition)
- Released: June 19, 2014
- Recorded: 2014
- Length: 3:56
- Label: Prospect Park, Caroline
- Songwriters: Reginald Arvizu; Tyler Blue; Jonathan Davis; Don Gilmore; James Shaffer; Nick Suddarth; Brian Welch
- Producer: Don Gilmore

Korn singles chronology
| "Spike in My Veins" (2014) | "Hater" (2014) | "Rotting in Vain" (2016) |

Music video
- "Hater" on YouTube

"Hater" is a song written and recorded by American nu metal band Korn. It was released as the third and final single from their eleventh studio album The Paradigm Shift on June 19, 2014.

== Background ==
The song was written in 2014 to serve as a new single to promote a special release of The Paradigm Shift, titled The Paradigm Shift: World Tour Edition. It was officially released to radio stations on June 19, 2014 and was made available for digital download on July 1, 2014.

== Composition ==
Regarding the song, lead vocalist Jonathan Davis says; "Everyone has someone who hates on you 'cause you have something they want. It's really, like, the first empowering song I've ever written. The lyrics are: 'You can’t bring me down/I've already had my life turned upside down/I ride a downward spiral round and round/But I keep flying, I keep fighting/You won’t ever bring me down.' That's like the most positive shit I've ever written. And everyone who's heard it loves it, and I think it's going to give people who get down on people picking on them and hating them, like, 'Fuck this! I don't give a fuck what you think. I don't give a fuck what you say. You just fuckin' are a hater.' I think people will relate with that."

== Music video ==
The video, directed by David "Yarvo" Yarovesky, premiered on August 21 and features videos, submitted by fans, about their bullying experiences, alongside Davis trying to push through a grey veil, and pale men and women harming themselves and/or getting drenched in blood, most of the vignettes have a red and grey color scheme.

The video ends with the message "Self harm or suicide is never the answer. Don't let the haters win. - KoRn".

== Track listing ==
Digital download

1. "Hater" - 3:56

== Charts ==
| Chart (2014) | Peak position |
|---|---|
| US Hot Rock & Alternative Songs (Billboard) | 45 |
| US Rock & Alternative Airplay (Billboard) | 35 |
