= Chemicals (EP) =

EP by Love and Death
- Released: April 24, 2012
- Recorded: 2011–2012
- Genre: Alternative metal, nu metal, Christian metal
- Length: 18:58
- Label: Tooth & Nail
- Producer: Jasen Rauch

Love and Death chronology
Save Me From Myself (2008)	Chemicals (2012)	Between Here & Lost (2013)

Singles from Chemicals
- 1. "Chemicals" Released: May 6, 2012

Professional ratings
Review scores
Source	Rating
Jesus Freak Hideout	3.5/5 stars

Chemicals is an extended play by the band Love and Death and was released on April 24, 2012.

== History ==
The band's debut single, "Chemicals", was released in early May, while their debut EP of the same name released on April 24, 2012. Welch revealed that they would be releasing a cover of the song "Whip It" by Devo and a remix of "Paralyzed" by Har Meggido. The music video for "Chemicals" premiered on May 7, 2012.

== Track listing ==
No.	Title	Writer(s)	Length
1.	"Paralyzed"	Brian Welch, Jasen Rauch	3:43
2.	"Whip It" (Devo cover; featuring Matt Baird of Spoken)	Casele, Mothersbaugh	3:07
3.	"Chemicals"	Welch, Rauch, Mark Holman, Michael Valentine	3:56
4.	"Paralyzed (Har Megiddo Remix)"	Welch, Rauch	3:37
5.	"Chemicals (Har Megiddo Remix)"	Welch, Rauch, Holman, Valentine	4:35
Total length:			18:58

== Personnel ==
Love and Death

- Brian 'Head' Welch – vocals, guitars
- JR Bareis - guitars
- Michael Valentine - bass guitar, guitars
- Dan Johnson - drums

Additional musicians

- Matt Baird - vocals on "Whip It"
- Joe Rickard - additional drums on "Paralyzed"
- Jasen Rauch - synthesizer, programming, additional guitars

Production personnel

- Jasen Rauch - producing, engineering
- Thigpen - editing, additional engineering
- David Wayne Williams - executive production
- Lee Bridges - mixing on "Paralyzed", "Whip It"
- Jim Monti - mixing on "Chemicals"
- Dan Shike - mastering
