= Never Never (Korn song) =

Single by Korn

from the album The Paradigm Shift
- Released: August 12, 2013
- Recorded: 2013
- Length: 3:41
- Label: Prospect Park, Caroline
- Songwriters: Reginald Arvizu, Jonathan Davis, Don Gilmore, Ray Luzier, James Shaffer, Brian Welch
- Producer: Don Gilmore

Korn singles chronology
"Chaos Lives in Everything" (2012)	"Never Never" (2013)	"Spike in My Veins" (2014)

Music video
- "Never Never" on YouTube

"Never Never" is the lead single from American nu metal band Korn's eleventh studio album, The Paradigm Shift. The band's first single with cofounding guitarist Brian "Head" Welch since 2004, it became their first number one on the Billboard Mainstream Rock chart.

== Background and composition ==
"It's a relationship song," said Jonathan Davis. "You go through that shit and you get hurt so bad. Then you think, 'It's not worth it anymore. I'm not going to fucking love again.' You experience so many pressures to be a good dad, a good husband, a good lover, or whatever. Being in a relationship is a lot of work."

== Release ==
Released to alternative, active rock, and heritage rock radio on August 12, 2013, the single was made available for purchase digitally on August 20, 2013.

"We just got our first No.1 single," marvelled Jonathan Davis. "It's amazing that, after twenty years, we're still putting out shit that people like."

== Music video ==
An official lyric video was uploaded to YouTube on August 13, 2013, and the band filmed a music video with director Giovanni Bucci. The latter premiered on September 6, 2013.

== Formats and track listings ==
Digital download
No.	Title	Length
1.	"Never Never" (Album version)	3:41

Never Never: The Remixes (EP)
No.	Title	Length
1.	"Never Never" (Radio version)	3:36
2.	"Never Never" (AWOLNATION remix)	3:26
3.	"Never Never" (Daniel Damico remix)	3:26
4.	"Never Never" (DevilSlug remix)	3:16
5.	"Never Never" (Calvertron remix)	5:10
6.	"Never Never" (Bro Safari x UFO! remix)	4:09
Total length:		23:03

== Charts ==
=== Weekly charts ===
Chart (2013)	Peak position
Canada Rock (Billboard)	32
Czech Republic Rock (IFPI)	9
US Hot Rock & Alternative Songs (Billboard)	30
US Rock & Alternative Airplay (Billboard)	13

Chart (2019)	Peak position
Hungary (Single Top 40)	32

=== Year-end charts ===
Chart (2013)	Position
US Hot Rock Songs (Billboard)	93

Chart (2014)	Position
US Mainstream Rock (Billboard)	44

== Appearances in media ==
"Never Never" was used as WWE's official 2013 TLC (Tables Ladders Chairs) pay-per-view theme song.
