= Flush (Brian Welch song) =

Single by Brian "Head" Welch

from the album Save Me from Myself
- Released: July 8, 2008
- Recorded: 2005
- Studio: Fortitude Studios in Phoenix, Arizona
- Genre: Christian metal, nu metal
- Length: 4:21
- Label: Driven Music Group
- Songwriter: Brian "Head" Welch
- Producers: Brian Welch, Steve Delaportas

Brian "Head" Welch singles chronology
"Flush" (2008)	"Re-Bel" (2009)

"Flush" is a song by American rock musician Brian "Head" Welch that was released as the first single from his debut album, Save Me from Myself, on July 8, 2008 exclusively on the iTunes Store.

== Production ==
In the digital booklet that came with "Flush", composer Brian Welch commented on the production of the song. The song was "created accidentally" in 2005. Welch had just finished writing the song "Save Me from Myself" and was planning to leave the studio for the night. However, he lost the key to the studio, and decided to remain there while his friend brought the key to him. While Welch was waiting for his friend, he had the thought "I'm gonna go back inside, grab my keyboard, and whatever my hands do, I'll make a song out of it." He immediately started playing the opening riff for "Flush". Welch then recorded the idea. When recording the sound of him puking for the beginning of the song, Welch brought a microphone into the studio bathroom. He then "[made] a huge cup of chunky liquids" and puked into the toilet.

== Themes ==
In the digital booklet that came with "Flush", composer Brian Welch discussed the themes that inspired the song lyrically. He explained that "Flush" is about "flushing all the crap in life down the toilet and starting out fresh." When he wrote the lyrics, he recalled when he was younger. Welch commented, "All the drama that I experienced with getting drunk and doing drugs all the time seemed interesting and amusing to write about. That life style is total insanity and I'm glad to be out of it." He went on to say that the purpose of the song is to inspire alcoholics and drug addicts to "get clean" and that "if I can encourage even one drug addict or alcoholic to get clean with 'Flush,' then the song has served its purpose."

== Music video ==
The music video for "Flush", directed by Frankie Nasso of Nova Entertainment, was released on September 5, 2008. According to a press release about the music video:

[The music video] takes a surprising turn away from what the conservative press would expect from Head and his spiritual awakening and takes an 'in-your-face,' gritty, but very honest look at the depths to which individuals will go to satisfy their drug/alcohol addictions or other vices. Wrapped with footage of real-life stories, and overlaid with other innuendo, Head's performance steals the picture and will answer anyone's questions as to whether he can still rock as hard or harder than his earlier days in Korn. The literal message in the final screen will get viewers thinking long and hard about any pre-conceived judgements they have about those in society typically viewed as losers.

The content of the music video has reportedly caused select retailers to pull Save Me from Myself from their shelves. This prompted Welch to provide his explanation of the video:

The video for 'Flush' is about crystal meth addiction and the crazy things anyone addicted to meth will do while they're high or to get their fix. Everything the models were doing in the video is what I was wrapped up in while I was addicted to meth. The video is a very realistic look at the addiction and where it will lead you if you get hooked. I understand the images of the models may be too much for some people, but honestly, I was just trying to be real with what happened in my life and show where I was, as well as where I am at now. I was totally imprisoned by meth ... I would do anything to get my meth ... I believe I would be dead right now if I continued using meth, but instead, I chose to surrender my life to Christ and die to myself so He could share His resurrection with me ... Significantly, the images also go along with what the kids (not actors) at the beginning of the video were honestly saying about their addictions.

== Reception ==
Reception for "Flush" has been mostly neutral. Some reviewers found the puking introduction odd, and Allmusic writer William Ruhlmann wrote about it, "... there can't be too many Christian albums which contain songs like "Flush" that begin and end with the sound of someone vomiting into a toilet. But that's the point." Some reviewers even thought the puking introduction was unnecessary, and Christianity Today writer Andrea Goforth commented on it, "... [I] don't think it was really necessary to record the sound of someone vomiting ... to convey the ugliness of drunkenness and addictions ..." Goforth continued to criticize "Flush", comparing it to Korn's 1998 single, "Freak on a Leash", "'Flush' ... just doesn't have quite the same effect as 'Freak on a Leash' did back in 1998."

Some reviewers, however, praised the song. Artistdirect writer Rick Florino said, "... 'Flush' ... touts the line between catchy and epic ... The song itself beckons multiple listens with numerous layers to delve back into on each go around." Despite criticism, Goforth did confess that the song had some good aspects in the interpretation, "... Head's approach to songwriting is honest and unflinching. Rather than take the easy route, he goes in deep for confession." Jesusfreakhideout writer Kevin Hoskins also praised the message of the song, stating, "'Flush' is about trashing all of the garbage in our life. The screaming chants of 'come on, get up, let's change' drive the message home."

== Track listing ==
=== Compact disc ===
No.	Title	Length
1.	"Flush (Radio edit)"	4:15
2.	"Flush (Puke version)"	4:21

=== Digital download ===
No.	Title	Length
1.	"Flush"	4:44

=== Deluxe digital download ===
No.	Title	Length
1.	"Flush"	4:43
2.	"Flush (Music video)"	5:15

== Personnel ==
- Brian Welch – vocals, lead guitar, producer
- Tony Levin – bass guitar
- Archie J. Muise, Jr. – rhythm guitar
- Josh Freese – drums
- Steve Delaportas – producer
- Ralph Patlan – mixing
- Carlos Castro – audio engineering
- Randy Emata – editing, sound effects
- Alonso Murillo – photography, artwork
- Dave Shirk – mastering
