= Save Me from Myself (album) =

Studio album by Brian "Head" Welch
- Released: September 9, 2008
- Recorded: 2005–2007
- Studio: Fortitude Studios, Phoenix, Arizona
- Genre: Christian metal; alternative metal; nu metal
- Length: 64:23
- Label: Driven, Warner, Rykodisc
- Producer: Brian Welch, Steve Delaportas

Brian "Head" Welch chronology
Save Me from Myself (2008)	Chemicals (as Love & Death) (2012)

Singles from Save Me from Myself
- 1. "Flush" Released: July 8, 2008; 2. "Re-Bel" Released: September 22, 2009

Save Me from Myself is the debut studio album by Korn guitarist Brian "Head" Welch. After failing to meet a July 2007 release, the album was released on September 9, 2008, by Driven Music Group. Tentatively, the album's working title was It's Time to See Religion Die, however, it was confirmed that its final title is Save Me from Myself.

== Background and production ==
In February 2005, Welch left Korn which he helped form in 1993, saying moral reasons caused his departure. Welch stated he had distanced himself from the band for one or two years, "I just wanted to fade away, it was crazy. I was so gone." Welch wished to rededicate his life to Jesus. Shortly after, Welch asked Korn's bassist, Reginald Arvizu, to produce the album, however, he received no response. While looking for a home in Arizona, Welch entered the recording studio. He immediately began writing; "entire songs would just come out: drums, bass, guitar, strings, choir, lyrics, everything... It was as if God was just downloading these songs inside me." After months of songwriting, "about three albums worth of material" had been created.

On the experience of working with other musicians again since his departure from Korn, Welch attests, "It's been a long time since I've connected with people musically and, now that the wounds have healed from my past addictions, I'm ready to feel the magic again."

== Promotion ==
On June 5, 2008, Welch posted a video announcement on his website. The video announced that Welch had officially signed with Driven Music Group, and would release Save Me from Myself on September 9, 2008.

A three-minute sample of Head's first single, "Flush", was posted on Welch's website on June 16, 2008. The single was released on July 8, 2008, on the iTunes Store, and a music video directed by Frankie Nasso of Nova Entertainment was filmed in Los Angeles, California, and released on September 5, 2008. On August 26, 2008, Welch revealed the lengths of each song on the album.

== Musical and lyrical themes ==
I always loved that Korn's music helped kids let out aggression. But with my new music, I want kids to know that there's more out there. I want to show them there's a light at the end of the pain tunnel. That there's more out there than just aggression. I want to say to them, 'Hey kids, come over here. Let's bounce back and forth and have fun.'

— Brian Welch

Welch wrote in his autobiography, Save Me from Myself, that ideas for lyrics and music often came from conversations with friends, including themes for "Re-Bel" and "Washed by Blood". The music has "a Christian, spiritual edge", while being an "extension of the Korn family". "I literally poured everything I had into Save Me from Myself," Welch explained in June 2008, "I know it's gonna inspire a lot of people."

The song "Flush", Welch explains, was written musically first. Welch had accidentally locked himself in his studio, so he decided, "I'm gonna go back inside, grab my keyboard, and whatever my hands do, I'll make a song out of it." He had created the opening riff for "Flush". Lyrically, Welch cites, "the lyrics for 'Flush' are basically about flushing all the crap in life down the toilet and starting out fresh," Welch continued, "All the drama that I experienced with getting drunk and doing drugs all the time seemed interesting and amusing to write about."

Welch wrote "Re-Bel" after a friend told him about a child she knew with problems, due to poor treatment from his parents. The story reminded Welch of how he used to drink and not take care of his daughter when he should have. The lyrics of the song are about kids who run to God due to negative things in their life so that "He could bring healing into their lives".

Welch said that the title track, "Save Me from Myself", is his most personal song. The verses talk about Welch's drug use, suicidal thoughts, depression, and lying. His favorite part "is when I'm screaming to God, thanking him for saving me from myself... and am living for Him now."

Welch said that "Die Religion Die" has multiple meanings to him. The song "encourages people to get out of the whole 'Sunday Christian' mentality" and helps them understand that God "dwells in us", not "in buildings". He wrote in his autobiography, "All of the man-made religion crap in this world has to die. Whether it's Christian man-made religion crap or some other man-made religion crap, it all has to die." Welch continues to explain, "All that prideful, controlling religious crap is what drives young people away from churches, and it has to go."

"Washed by Blood" was written after a conversation with another friend, who asked him "isn't it cool that we're washed by blood?" over breakfast one morning. Welch wrote that he was referring to the Bible calling Jesus' punishment and bleeding on the cross as being "washed by blood". After their meal, "suddenly, this music came into his head".

Referring to the art theme of the cover of the album, Welch explained, "It represents me being trapped in addictions, and getting set free from it from the angel that is standing behind me."

== Reception ==
Professional ratings
Review scores
Source	Rating
About.com	3.5/5 stars
Allmusic	3/5 stars
Artistdirect	3/5 stars
Christianity Today	3.5/5 stars
Cross Rhythms	8/10 squares
Jesusfreakhideout.com	4.5/5 stars
Kerrang!	2/5 stars
Thrash Hits	3.5/6 stars

Save Me from Myself received mixed reception from critics. Some praised the album's message, "Even though the music of Save Me from Myself isn't quite on par with the super hit material of Korn from the late '90s, it is nevertheless a very good nü-metal album with an amazing story of redemption." Andrea Goforth of Christianity Today stated, "The content is so much more positive that anything released by Korn, that I can look past the absence of hooks to find a great deal of hope." Hit Parader praised the musical aspect, stating, "though his lyrical messages may now be more positive and uplifting than anything found in the Korn hard rock catalogue, the style of music brought forth here is as heavy as anything Mr. Welch has ever presented before." The magazine went on to praise the album's lack of "preachy" messages, "throughout Save Me From Myself Head manages to present his inspirational messages without necessarily preaching his beliefs to the metal masses." About.com writer Chad Bowar stated that, "although many of the songs are slow in tempo they don't lack in intensity." Chad Bowar went on to mention the variety of musical styles on the album, "There is a lot of musical diversity, and you'll hear everything from melodic mainstream rock to traditional metal to very dissonant and unsettling harmonies." It has been proposed that the album has a distinctive sound, very reminiscent to Korn, but different in the matter that its uplifting.

The general praise of Save Me from Myself has not been unanimous, however. Reviewing for Metal Edge, Madeline Phillips felt that, "Sadly, in pursuit of greater spiritual understanding . . . Welch seems to have lost all sense of a relatable musical identity and direction," and that despite some noteworthy riffs and decent melodies, the album is "not just alienating - quite frankly, it's boring."

Save Me from Myself shipped over 7,800 copies in its opening week. It debuted at No. 27 in New Zealand, No. 63 on the Billboard 200, No. 7 on the Independent Albums chart, and No. 3 on the Christian Albums chart.

=== "Flush" controversy ===
The content of the "Flush" music video reportedly caused select retailers to pull Save Me from Myself from their shelves. This prompted Welch to provide his explanation for what transpires in the video:

The video for 'Flush' is about crystal meth addiction and the crazy things anyone addicted to meth will do while they're high or to get their fix. Everything the models were doing in the video is what I was wrapped up in while I was addicted to meth. The video is a very realistic look at the addiction and where it will lead you if you get hooked. I understand the images of the models may be too much for some people, but honestly, I was just trying to be real with what happened in my life and show where I was, as well as where I am at now. I was totally imprisoned by meth ... I would do anything to get my meth ... I believe I would be dead right now if I continued using meth, but instead, I chose to surrender my life to Christ and die to myself so He could share His resurrection with me ... Significantly, the images also go along with what the kids (not actors) at the beginning of the video were honestly saying about their addictions.

== Track listing ==
All tracks are written by Brian "Head" Welch.

No.	Title	Length
1.	"L.O.V.E."	6:31
2.	"Flush"	4:26
3.	"Loyalty"	5:07
4.	"Re-Bel"	5:40
5.	"Home"	6:52
6.	"Save Me from Myself"	5:44
7.	"Die Religion Die"	5:34
8.	"Adonai"	5:19
9.	"Money"	4:43
10.	"Shake"	4:48
11.	"Washed by Blood"	9:34
Total length:		64:23

== Charts ==
Chart (2008)	Peak position
New Zealand (RIANZ)	27
US Billboard 200	63
US Christian Albums (Billboard)	3
US Independent Albums (Billboard)	7
US Rock Albums (Billboard)	21
US Hard Rock Albums (Billboard)	13

== Personnel ==
- Brian Welch – vocals, lead and rhythm guitar, synthesizers, programming, producer
- Archie J. Muise Jr. – rhythm guitar
- Trevor Dunn – bass guitar
- Tony Levin – bass guitar
- Josh Freese – drums
- Jennea Welch – vocals on "Re-Bel"
- Doug Angle – vocals on "Re-Bel"
- Christian McCullen – vocals on "Re-Bel"
- Elijah Jurewics – vocals on "Re-Bel"
- Hailey Cooper – vocals on "Re-Bel"
- Taylor Cooper – vocals on "Re-Bel"
- Greg Shanaberger – production supervisor
- Mark Nawara – production supervisor
- Carlos Castro – engineer
- Randy Emata – editing, synthesizers, programming
- Ralph Patlan – editing, mixing
- Bruno Canale – engineer, guitar technician
- Fernando Romay – engineer, guitar technician
- Rafael Patrón – production coordinator
- Patrick Essman – production assistant
- Clint Keener – production assistant
- Evren Goknar – mastering
- Travis Smith – artwork, layout
- Alonso Murillo – photography, photo editing
- Bob Clearmountain – mixing

== Release history ==
Region	Date	Label	Format
North America	September 9, 2008	Driven Music Group	Compact disc
North America	September 9, 2008	Driven Music Group	12" vinyl
Europe	December 12, 2008	Soulfood Music Distribution	Compact disc
