= A Song for Chi =

2009 song

Instrumental by Various musicians
- Released: August 28, 2009
- Recorded: 2009
- Genre: Heavy metal; nu metal; alternative metal; instrumental rock
- Length: 3:54
- Producer(s): Fieldy; Q-Unique

"A Song for Chi" is an instrumental alternative metal song recorded by several high-profile rock and metal musicians to raise money for poet and Deftones bassist Chi Cheng, who was severely injured in a car crash in Santa Clara, California on November 4, 2008. All profits from the song went directly to Cheng and his family for the purpose of paying for his medical care. After struggling with the injuries caused by the accident, more than 4 years later in April 2013, Cheng died.

== Recording ==
The project was initiated by fellow bassist Reginald "Fieldy" Arvizu of Korn in May 2009, besides himself Arvizu revealed that former Army of Anyone and current Korn drummer Ray Luzier, Slipknot's Jim Root, Sevendust's Clint Lowery and Korn guitarist Brian Welch would also be recording for the project. The project would also be the first collaboration between Welch and any of his former bandmates since his departure from the band in 2005. Recordings for the song continued to take place at various venues and studios throughout the world during Korn's Escape From the Studio Tour. On June 8 Machine Head's Dave McClain recorded drums for the song on stage in Berlin before Machine Head opened for Korn. On June 17 Sevendust's Morgan Rose and Clint Lowery recorded drums and guitars respectively in Paris. At the Sonisphere Festival in the Netherlands former Ozzy Osbourne and current Metallica bassist Robert Trujillo recorded bass for the song. Adam Dutkiewicz of Killswitch Engage tracked guitars for the song on June 24 in San Sebastian, Spain. On June 28 Hatebreed guitarist Wayne Lozinak recorded for the song backstage at the Graspop Metal Meeting in Dessel, Belgium. Former Korn guitarist Brian Welch and his former bandmate James Shaffer recorded guitars for the song on June 1 and 6 respectively. In addition to these recordings musicians such as Mike Wengren, Noah Bernardo and Sid Wilson also recorded for the song. The music was produced by Fieldy along with StillWell's Q-Unique and mixed by Jim Monti. The song is available for free via music download on its official website where donations are also accepted. All proceeds will go directly to Cheng and his family.

== Personnel ==
=== Guitarists ===
- Brian Welch from Korn and Love & Death: guitars
- Jim Root from Slipknot: guitars
- Adam Dutkiewicz from Killswitch Engage: guitars
- Clint Lowery from Sevendust: guitars
- James Shaffer from Korn: guitars
- Wayne Lozinak from Hatebreed: guitars

=== Bassists ===
- Reginald Arvizu from Korn: bass
- Robert Trujillo from Metallica: bass

=== Drummers ===
- Mike Wengren from Disturbed: drums
- Ray Luzier from Korn: drums
- Noah Bernardo from P.O.D.: drums
- Dave McClain from Machine Head: drums
- Morgan Rose from Sevendust: drums

Technical

- Reginald Arvizu: production
- Sid Wilson from Slipknot: turntables
- Q-Unique: production, engineering
- Ralph Patlan: engineering
- Jim Monti: mixing
