= A Killer's Confession =

American alternative metal band

- Origin: Cleveland, Ohio, U.S.
- Genres: Alternative metal; nu metal
- Years active: 2016–present
- Members: Waylon Reavis; JP Cross; Justin Kalenits; Sean Heenan
- Past members: Jon Dale; Matthew Trumpy; Morgan Bauer; Tommy Church; Shawn Iannazzo
- Website: akcglobalrecords.com

A Killer's Confession is an American alternative metal band from Cleveland, Ohio formed in 2016 by former Mushroomhead vocalist Waylon Reavis. It also currently consists of bassist JP Cross and keyboardist Richard "Stitch" Thomas.

== History ==
In September 2016, Waylon Reavis announced on Facebook that his new project, A Killer's Confession, had signed a deal with EMP Label Group who would release their debut album Unbroken in Spring 2017. The album was partially recorded and mixed at Kentucky's Third Sky Studio with Reavis, and co-Producers Thom Hazaert and Richard Easterling. On Halloween 2016 AKC released their debut single "A Killer's Confession", featuring a guest performance by Korn guitarist Brian "Head" Welch. The band played their first shows in December 2016, with Dead By Wednesday, culminating in a hometown show at the Cleveland Agora on December 17, featuring guitarist Matthew Trumpy, bassist JP Cross and drummer Jon Dale.

The band would have increasing success with the release of albums The Indifference of Good Men, Remember, and Victim 1. Following the success of Victim 1 the band would embark on the A horrifying trip back to the 2000s tour featuring former Mushroomhead members including vocalist Jason "J Mann" Popson and keyboardist Tom "Shmotz" Schmitz. The line-up would change to feature Popson, drummer Daniel "Lil' Dan" Fox, guitarist Thomas "Tankx" Shaffner and eventually keyboardist Richard "Stitch" Thomas. After the tour concluded the prior line-up had dissolved except for Reavis and Cross, with Thomas joining full time.

== Band members ==
Current members

- Waylon Reavis – lead vocals, programming (2016–present)
- JP Cross – bass (2017–present), guitars (touring 2025)
- Sean Heenan – drums (2025–present; touring 2025)
- Justin Kalenits - guitar (2025–present)

Current studio members

- Dusten "Dusty" Boles - guitars, drums, programming, songwriting (2023–present)
- Evan McKeever - vocal production, songwriting (2023–present)

Former members

- Jon Dale – drums (2016–2018), bass (2016–2017)
- Matthew Trumpy – guitars, programming (2016–2018)
- Tommy Church – guitars (2018; 2019–2021)
- Morgan Bauer – drums (2018–2022)
- Shawn Iannazzo - guitars (2021–2023)

== Discography ==
- 2017 – Unbroken
- 2019 – The Indifference Of Good Men
- 2021 – Remember
- 2024 – Victim 1
- 2025 – Victim 2
- 2026 – Victim 3

=== Singles ===
List of singles as lead artist, with selected chart positions and certifications, showing year released and album name
Title	Year	Peak chart positions	Album
Title	Year	US Main.	Album
"Angel on the Outside"	2017	—	The Indifference of Good Men
"I Wish"	2017	—	The Indifference of Good Men
"Reanimated"	2018	—	The Indifference of Good Men
"Numb"	2018	—	The Indifference of Good Men
"Last Chance"	2020	—	Non-album single
"Remember"	2021	33	Remember
"Light to Darkness"	2021	—	Remember
"Trapped Inside"	2021	—	Remember
"Between Your Eyes"	2021	—	Remember
"Knife From Behind"	2021	—	Remember
"Tell Your Soul" (Feat. Chad Gray)	2021	—	Remember
"A Better Time"	2022	—	Non-album single
"The Boys" (Feat. Matthew Trumpy & Jon Dale)	2022	—	Non-album single
"Be My Witness"	2022	—	Non-album single
"Tongue"	2023	—	Victim1
"Greed"	2024	—	Victim1
"Martyr"	2024	—	Victim1
"Filth"	2024	—	Victim1
"Voices" (Feat. Aaron Nordstrom)	2024	—	Victim1
"In Case Of Emergency" (Feat. J Mann)	2025	—	Victim2
"Hollow"	2025	—	Victim2
"Facts"	2025	—	Victim2
"Heart Shaped Box"	2025	—	Victim2
"Blinding Lights"	2026	—	Victim3

=== Music videos ===
Title	Year	Director(s)
"Rebirth"	2017	Joseph Shaw
"Angel on the Outside"	2018	Scott Johnson
"Numb"	2019	Domonick Giorgianni
"The Shore"	2019	Domonick Giorgianni
"Last Chance"	2020	Unknown
"It's Not Too Late"	2020	Dominick Giorgianni
"Remember"	2021	Wombat Fire
"Light to Darkness	2021	Dominick Giorgianni
"Trapped Inside"	2021	Dominick Giorgianni
"Between Your Eyes"	2021	Dominick Giorgianni
"Knife From Behind"	2021	Dominick Giorgianni
"Tell Your Soul"	2021	Wombat Fire
"Ascending"	2021	Dominick Giorgianni
"Heaven Alone"	2022	Dominick Giorgianni
"The Boys"	2022	Alex Hatrix
"Be My Witness"	2022	Alex Hatrix
"Roots Bloody Roots"	2023	Alex Hatrix
"Tongue"	2023	Michael Levine
"Greed"	2024	Michael Levine
"Martyr"	2024	Michael Levine & Toddi Babu
"Voices"	2024	Michael Levine
"In Case Of Emergency"	2025	Richard Thomas & Austin Scherzberg
"Hollow"	2025	Richard Thomas & Austin Scherzberg
"Heart Shaped Box"	2025	Austin Scherzberg
"Hopeless Gray"	2025	Richard Thomas & Austin Scherzberg
"Blinding Lights"	2026	Dustin Boles

== Awards ==
Stone Chrome Radio Listener's Choice Awards

Year	Nominee / work	Award	Result
2016	A Killer's Confession	Breakout Band of the year	Won

Rock Rage Radio Awards

Year	Nominee / work	Award	Result
2017	Unbroken	Album of the Year	Won
2017	Rebirth	Video of the Year	Won
2017	Angel on the Outside	Song of the year	Won
2017	Waylon Reavis	Male Singer of the year	Won
2017	JP Cross	Bass Player of the year	Won
2017	Matt Trumpy	Guitarist of the year	Won
2017	Jon Dale	Drummer of the year	Won
