= Spike in My Veins =

Single by Korn

from the album The Paradigm Shift
- Released: February 6, 2014
- Recorded: 2013
- Length: 4:24
- Label: Prospect Park, Caroline
- Songwriters: Reginald Arvizu, Jonathan Davis, Ray Luzier, Nik Roos, James Shaffer, Martijn van Sonderen
- Producer: Don Gilmore

Korn singles chronology
"Never Never" (2013)	"Spike in My Veins" (2014)	"Hater" (2014)

Music video
- "Spike in My Veins" on YouTube

"Spike in My Veins" is a song written and recorded by American nu metal band Korn, released as the second single from their eleventh studio album The Paradigm Shift on February 6, 2014.

== Background and composition ==
The song was originally written as a collaboration with Noisia, for singer Jonathan Davis' solo moniker, JDevil.

Regarding the song and video, Jonathan Davis says, "We are all so caught up in watching crazy media on the internet and TV that we are manipulated into ignoring that our privacy has all but disappeared".

== Music video ==
The music video focuses primarily on media manipulation and how the government distracts citizens from the NSA spying as well as the President of the United States slowly taking away freedoms. The music video includes several celebrity outbursts from 2013 including Miley Cyrus' MTV Video Music Award performance, Toronto mayor Rob Ford's "I don't smoke crack" interview, Kanye West's attack on paparazzi, and others. The music video was directed by David Dinetz

== Reception ==
The song, alongside its music video, was heavily criticised by Vice.

== Formats and track listing ==
Digital download

1. "Spike in My Veins" (album version) - 4:24

Physical single

1. "Spike in My Veins" (album version) - 4:24
2. "Spike in My Veins" (Instrumental) - 4:24

== Charts ==
Chart (2014)	Peak position
US Rock & Alternative Airplay (Billboard)	26
