= Just for the Record (Ray Stevens album) =

Studio album by Ray Stevens
- Released: March 1976
- Genre: Country
- Label: Warner Bros.
- Producer: Ray Stevens

Ray Stevens chronology
Both Sides of Ray Stevens (1976)	Just for the Record (1976)	Feel the Music (1977)

Just for the Record is the thirteenth studio album by Ray Stevens and his first for Warner Bros. Records, released in 1976. For this album, Stevens specializes particularly in the music genre of country. Joe Cocker's hit "You Are So Beautiful" is the only cover song on the album. "You Are So Beautiful" and "Honky Tonk Waltz" are two singles lifted from the album.

== Track listing ==
Side one
No.	Title	Writer(s)	Length
1.	"Cornball"	Ray Stevens	3:11
2.	"Gimme a Smile"	Toni Wine	2:59
3.	"Once in a While"	Lamar Hill	3:26
4.	"One and Only You"	Buddy Kalb	2:51
5.	"You Are So Beautiful"	Billy Preston, Bruce Fisher	2:24

Side two
No.	Title	Writer(s)	Length
1.	"Can't Stop Dancin'"	Ray Stevens, John Pritchard	3:16
2.	"Om"	Ray Stevens	4:29
3.	"One Man Band"	Ray Stevens	3:00
4.	"Country Licks"	Layng Martine, Jr.	2:47
5.	"Honky Tonk Waltz"	Paul Craft	2:45

== Album credits ==
- Arranged and Produced by: Ray Stevens
- Recorded at Ray Stevens Sound Laboratory, Nashville
- Engineer: Tom Knox
- Art Direction, Photography by: Ed Thrasher

== Charts ==
Album - Billboard (North America)

Year	Chart	Position
1976	Billboard Top Country Albums	34

Singles - Billboard (North America)

Year	Single	Chart	Position
1976	"You Are So Beautiful"	Billboard Hot Country Singles & Tracks	16
1976	"You Are So Beautiful"	Canadian RPM Country Tracks	17
1976	"You Are So Beautiful"	Bubbling Under Hot 100 Singles	101
1976	"Honky Tonk Waltz"	Billboard Hot Country Singles & Tracks	27
1976	"Honky Tonk Waltz"	Canadian RPM Country Tracks	38
