= Feel the Music (Ray Stevens album) =

Studio album by Ray Stevens
- Released: January 1977
- Genre: Country
- Label: Warner Bros.
- Producer: Ray Stevens

Ray Stevens chronology
Just for the Record (1976)	Feel the Music (1977)	The Many Sides of Ray Stevens (1977)

Feel the Music is the fourteenth studio album by Ray Stevens and his second for Warner Bros. Records, released in 1977. Like Stevens' previous album, this album is devoted completely to the styles of country music. "Get Crazy with Me" and "Dixie Hummingbird" are two singles that were lifted from the album.

== Track listing ==
Side one
No.	Title	Writer(s)	Length
1.	"Feel the Music"	Ray Stevens	3:50
2.	"Daydream Romance"	Stevens	3:33
3.	"Blues Love Affair"	Stevens	2:47
4.	"Alone with You"	Stevens	3:19
5.	"Junkie for You"	Stevens	3:39

Side two
No.	Title	Writer(s)	Length
1.	"Get Crazy with Me"	Stevens	3:59
2.	"Save Me from Myself"	Stevens	4:15
3.	"Road Widow"	Stevens	2:54
4.	"Set the Children Free"	C.W. Kalb, Jr.	3:14
5.	"Dixie Hummingbird"	Stevens	2:42

== Personnel ==
- Arranged and Produced by: Ray Stevens
- Recorded at: Ray Stevens Sound Laboratory, Nashville
- Engineer: Tom Knox
- Photographed and Designed by: Ed Thrasher
- Illustrations by: Peter Palombi
- Bass: Jack Williams, Tommy Cogbill, Mike Leech
- Drums: Jerry Kroon, Jerry Carrigan ("Set the Children Free" only)
- Guitars: Mark Casstevens, Reggie Young, Grady Martin, Johnny Christopher ("Set the Children Free" only)
- Harmonica: Charlie McCoy, Terry McMillan
- Horns: Ray Stevens, Denis H. Solee
- Keyboards: Ray Stevens
- Strings: Sheldon Kurland String Section
- Background Voices: Ray Stevens, Prissy Reed, Toni Wine, Mt. Pisgah Young People's Chorus

== Charts ==
Album - Billboard (North America)

Chart (1977)	Peak position
Billboard Top Country Albums	50

Singles - Billboard (North America)

Year	Single	Chart	Position
1977	"Get Crazy With Me"	Billboard Hot Country Singles & Tracks	81
1977	"Dixie Hummingbird"	Billboard Hot Country Singles & Tracks	44
1976	"Dixie Hummingbird"	Canadian RPM Country Tracks	43
