= Ilia (band) =

American band

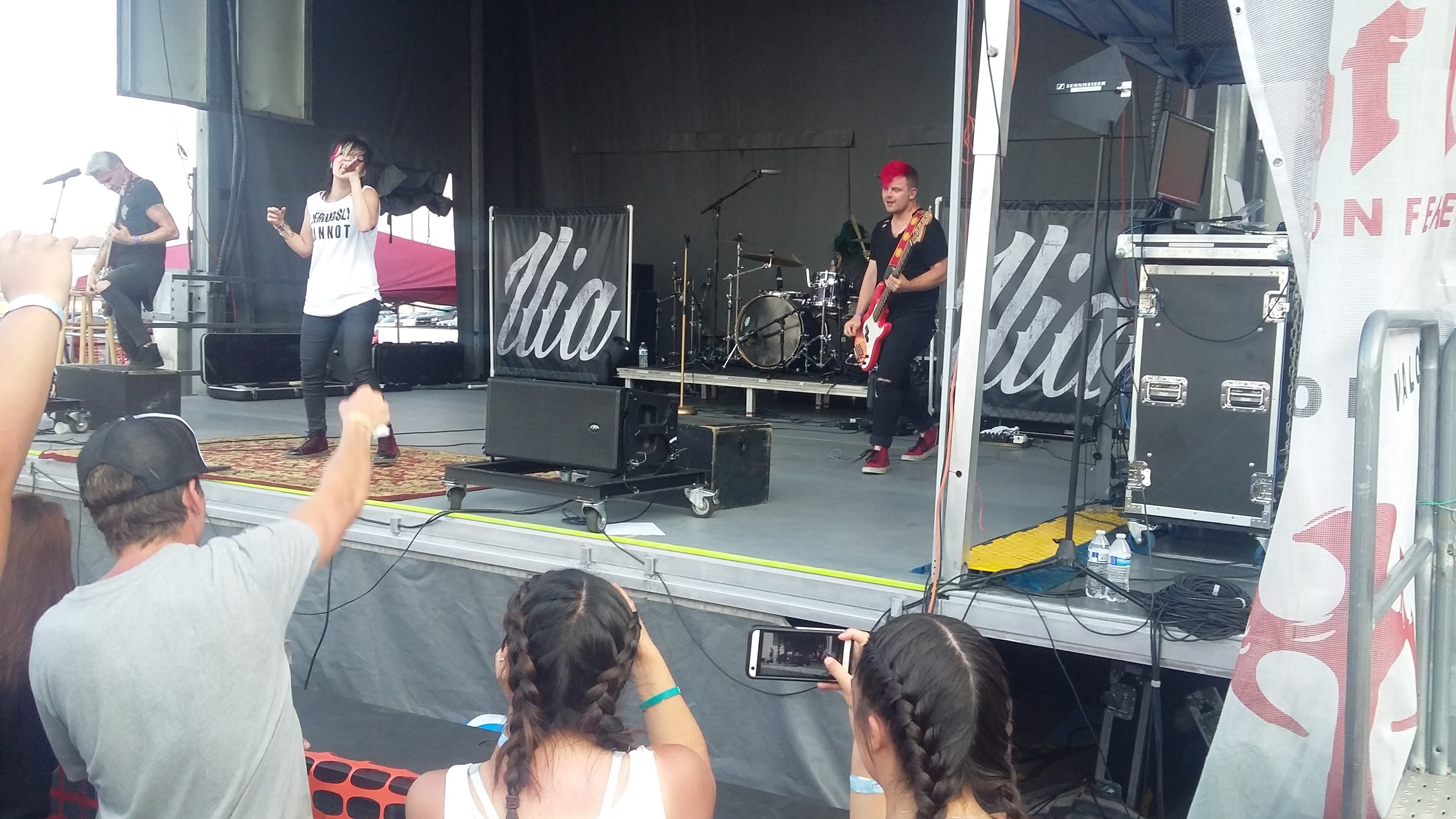
- Ilia at HeavenFest 2016

Background information
- Origin: Pine Bluff, Arkansas, United States
- Genres: Hard rock, ambient, indie rock
- Years active: 2003–2016
- Label: indie
- Members: Suzy Martinez; Jessica Patterson; Justin Patterson
- Past members: Brittney Mosher; Lindsey Armstrong; Alyssa Duncan; Katie Knott; Jared Black; Ben Flora
- Website: http://www.iliamusic.com/

Ilia was an American Christian rock group from Pine Bluff, Arkansas. The band consisted of Suzy Martinez (lead vocals), Jessica Patterson (drums) and Justin Patterson (guitar).

Ilia formed under the name Relentless Pursuit in 2003. When the original band dissolved, some of the members formed a new band while attending Visible School (located in Memphis, Tennessee). The band began touring full-time in 2007 and garnered praise from numerous outlets, including being named the #2 Unsigned Band in HM Magazine's Readers' Poll 3 years in a row-2008, 2009, 2010 and placing #6 on CCM Magazine's list of Best Hard Rock Bands of 2007. They had five national charting radio singles "Last Night", "Portrait of a Lying Heart", "Wake The Dead", "We Were Shipwrecks" (#2 Billboard Christian Rock Chart-August 27, 2011), and "Ezekiel" (#8 Billboard).

In April 2009, co-founder and rhythm guitarist Lindsey Armstrong (née Pierce) left the group in order to minister with her husband. The band then went on a year-long hiatus. Brittney Mosher joined the band in early 2010, originally to fill in Lindsey's spot as guitarist. As the band was contemplating touring but still needing a vocalist, Brittney filled in. After the first tour run, the band decided to keep Brittney on both vocals and guitar.

The band released an independent EP, We Were Shipwrecks, in the summer of 2011 to moderate success, with "We Were Shipwrecks," hitting #2 on the Billboard Christian Rock Chart and "Ezekiel" hitting #8.

Their sound continued to evolve on their follow up EP, Reborn, in 2014 with a new lead vocalist, Suzy Martinez, formerly of Our Divine Romance that blended elements of hard rock, metal, and melodic pop music. Reborn had a positive reception, with New Release Tuesday stating, "Reborn proves that Ilia has found their footing, and the future is nothing but bright for this band." The album spent over 20 weeks on the Billboard Christian Rock, with several weeks in the top 10, and spawned two charting singles, "My Allegiance," which hit #3 on the Billboard Christian Rock Chart, and "Young Diaries," which hit #2. Four songs on the album, "As Winter Stays," "Loving Led," "My Allegiance," and "Young Diaries" reached Top 5 on christianrock.net, with "Young Diaries" reaching the number one spot.

The band attempted to crowdfund a 2016 EP on Indiegogo, eventually falling short, reaching $5,479 of their $12,000 goal. Despite the failure, they continued to tour through November 2016, before finally disbanding in December 2016.

On July 17, 2017 Suzy Martinez, the final vocalist for Ilia, released an original song titled "Underneath" under her new moniker, Zahna (singer).

On January 8, 2018, the official Ilia Facebook page rebranded under the name Vital Empire, a new project by Justin Patterson and Jessica Patterson, the former lead guitarist and drummer, respectively.

== Discography ==
- Ilia - Ep (2007)
- Ilia - Special Edition EP (2008)
- We Were Shipwrecks (2011)
- Reborn (2014)
