= The Paradigm Shift =

Studio album by Korn
- Released: October 7, 2013
- Recorded: October 2012 – May 2013
- Studios: Buck Owens Studio, Bakersfield, California; NRG Recording Studios (Studio A), North Hollywood, Los Angeles
- Genres: Nu metal; alternative metal
- Length: 42:54
- Labels: Prospect Park; Caroline; Universal
- Producer: Don Gilmore

Korn chronology
The Path of Totality (2011)	The Paradigm Shift (2013)	The Serenity of Suffering (2016)

Singles from The Paradigm Shift
- 1. "Never Never" Released: August 12, 2013; 2. "Spike in My Veins" Released: February 6, 2014; 3. "Hater" Released: June 15, 2014 (World Tour Edition only)

Alternative cover
- Cover for the World Tour Edition.

The Paradigm Shift is the eleventh studio album by American nu metal band Korn. Produced by Don Gilmore, it was released by multiple labels in the United Kingdom on October 7, 2013, and in the United States the next day. It is the first Korn album to feature original guitarist Brian "Head" Welch since 2003's Take a Look in the Mirror.

== Background ==
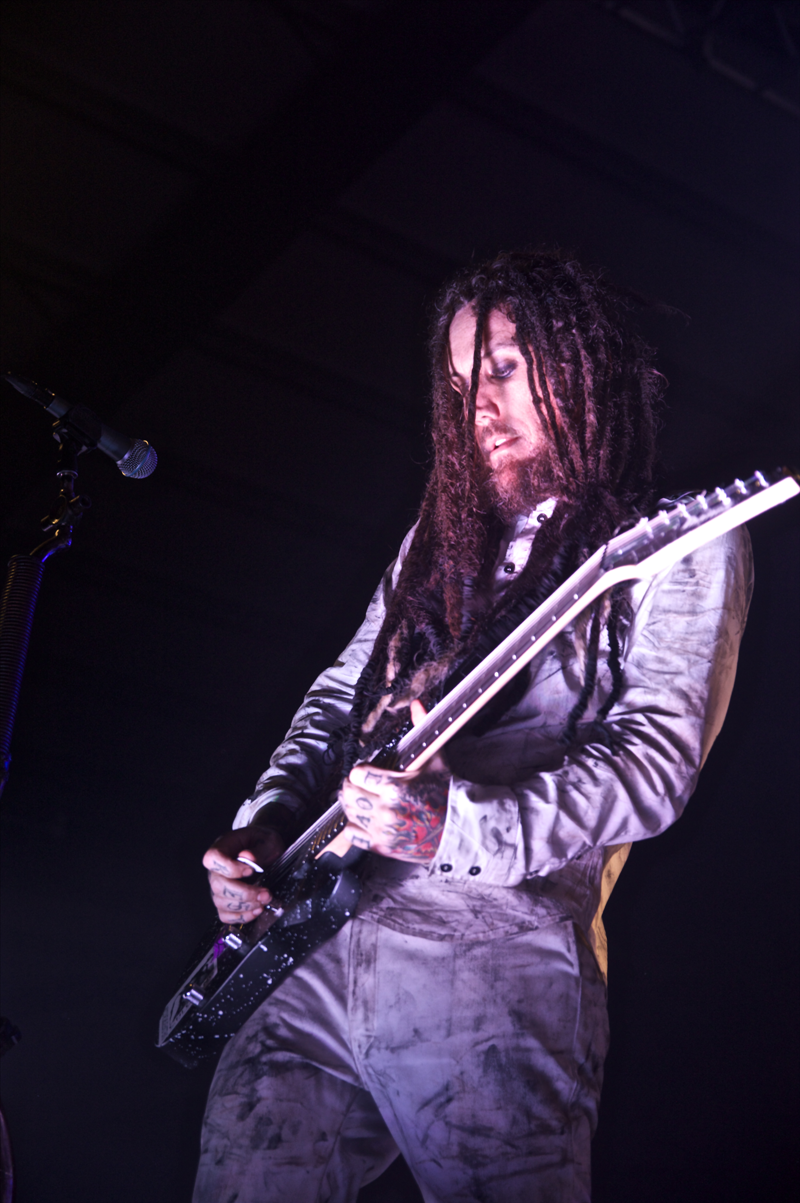
This is Korn's first album since 2003's "Take a Look in the Mirror" with founding guitarist Brian "Head" Welch

Following the year after the release of The Path of Totality, Korn had begun proposing ideas for their next album. James "Munky" Shaffer stated that the album would contain darker elements similar to Issues (1999) mixed with the heaviness of Untouchables (2002). On May 2, 2013, it was revealed that original guitarist Brian "Head" Welch rejoined the band after an eight-year absence and had been recording for the new album. The first single, "Never Never", was officially released on August 12, 2013. The track "Love & Meth" leaked on September 6, 2013, after the band had released several previews. The track "Lullaby for a Sadist" was originally written in 2010 prior to the idea of a dubstep-infused album, but the song did not make the cut for Korn III: Remember Who You Are. "Spike in My Veins" was originally written and recorded with Noisia for inclusion on J Devil's debut album, but ended up being reworked as a Korn song.

== Composition ==
Regarding the sound, Munky says, "The new music is inspired by our Issues album, or even Untouchables, that era. It’s a little more melodic and a little more aggressive at the same time." Head added in an interview with Rolling Stone that "I'm a metalhead. I love rock music, and I came here just wanting to do the old Korn vibe, but with a new twist. "Me and Munky [James Shaffer] haven't been playing guitar together for eight years, so we came in just wanting to jam out with the bass player Fieldy [Reginald Arvizu] and Ray [Luzier], our drummer. The end product is a really good mix of old Korn mixed with some new elements. It's got a fresh new Korn 2013 sound."

Jonathan Davis described the writing and recording process as "weird". He explains: "They started writing, I think, in August, and I didn't get into the studio until March, because I was going through all kinds of crazy shit. My boy got diabetes and I had come off medication for my depression, and that fucked me up. I was in a straight haze." Davis entered rehab, then returned to writing the album. "It was weird – I moved into the studio. I stayed there for four months, I only came home on weekends. I moved my boys in with me, so I had my kids with me the whole time. It was an interesting creative space." Davis continued, "I don't know how the hell I did it. I was so fucked up from coming off all that medicine, and I feel so good about the record. When I look back now, I'm like, 'Wow, how did I come up with this shit?'"

== Album title and packaging ==
The album cover, designed by Roboto, features two opposing heads, reminiscent of the Rubin vase illusion.

The title was explained by Munky:

"It's a term encompassing different perspectives. You can view a piece of art from one angle and it takes on a certain image. If you look from another angle, it's a completely different image. We liken that to Korn in 2013. With Head back in the fold, all of the elements fans have loved since day one are there, but we're interpreting them from a new perspective. It's a bigger, brighter and bolder Korn.

The standard edition of the album features 11 new tracks, while the deluxe edition contains an additional two tracks and a bonus DVD documenting the return of co-founding guitarist Brian "Head" Welch.

A special edition of the album was released on July 22, 2014, as The Paradigm Shift: World Tour Edition. It contains brand new studio and live recordings. The first new track, "Hater", was released as a single on June 19.

== Reception ==
=== Critical reception ===
Professional ratings
Aggregate scores
Source	Rating
Metacritic	65/100
Review scores
Source	Rating
AllMusic	4/5 stars
Artistdirect	5/5 stars
Blabbermouth.net	7.5/10
Metal Hammer	4/5 stars
MetalSucks	1/5 stars
PopMatters	6/10
Rock Sound	8/10
Rolling Stone	2/5 stars
Ultimate Guitar Archive	8.5/10

According to the review aggregator Metacritic, The Paradigm Shift received "generally favorable reviews" based on a weighted average score of 65 out of 100 from 7 critic scores.

Max Barrett of Rock Sound wrote the album was "a completely different monster to its predecessor, and for all the right reasons" in his favorable review of album. AllMusic stated the album "shows the kind of creativity and inventiveness that ... helped to make them an influential force in heavy music."

PopMatters gave the album a mixed review, stating that the album "may not quite be Korn's best album ever, but The Paradigm Shift is Korn's best album since Untouchables and metal fans could do a lot worse than that".

=== Commercial performance ===
The Paradigm Shift sold 46,000 copies in the United States in its first week of release, and debuted and peaked at No. 8 on the Billboard 200, making it Korn's tenth studio album to peak in the top ten. The album has sold 174,000 copies as of September 2016 in the US.

== Track listing ==
All tracks are written by James Shaffer, Jonathan Davis, Brian Welch, Ray Luzier, Reginald Arvizu, and Don Gilmore.

Standard edition
No.	Title	Writer(s)	Length
1.	"Prey for Me"		3:38
2.	"Love & Meth"	Davis, Shaffer, Welch, Arvizu, Luzier, Gilmore, Rauch, Suddarth	4:04
3.	"What We Do"		4:06
4.	"Spike in My Veins"	Davis, Shaffer, Welch, Arvizu, Luzier, Nightwatch	4:25
5.	"Mass Hysteria"		4:04
6.	"Paranoid and Aroused"		3:35
7.	"Never Never"		3:41
8.	"Punishment Time"		4:01
9.	"Lullaby for a Sadist"		4:19
10.	"Victimized"		3:36
11.	"It's All Wrong"		3:32
Total length:			42:54

Deluxe edition
No.	Title	Length
12.	"Wish I Wasn't Born Today"	3:03
13.	"Tell Me What You Want"	3:02
Total length:		48:59

Japanese deluxe edition
No.	Title	Length
12.	"Wish I Wasn't Born Today"	3:03
13.	"Tell Me What You Want"	3:02
14.	"Die Another Day"	3:45
Total length:		52:44

World Tour edition bonus disc
No.	Title	Length
1.	"Hater"	3:53
2.	"The Game Is Over"	3:40
3.	"Die Another Day"	3:43
4.	"Love & Meth (Live in London)"	4:10
5.	"Here to Stay (Live in London)"	4:53
6.	"Get Up! (Live in Moscow)"	4:07
7.	"Never Never (Live in Moscow)"	4:19
8.	"Got the Life (Live in Denver)"	4:02
9.	"Another Brick in the Wall (Live in Denver)"	9:25
Total length:		42:12

(Japanese Deluxe edition) World Tour edition bonus disc
No.	Title	Length
1.	"Hater"	3:53
2.	"The Game Is Over"	3:40
3.	"Die Another Day"	3:43
4.	"Love & Meth (Live in London)"	4:10
5.	"Here to Stay (Live in London)"	4:53
6.	"Get Up! (Live in Moscow)"	4:07
7.	"Never Never (Live in Moscow)"	4:19
8.	"Got the Life (Live in Denver)"	4:02
9.	"Another Brick in the Wall (Live in Denver)"	9:25
10.	"Never Never (Awolnation Remix)"	3:27
11.	"Never Never (Daniel Damico Remix)"	3:26
12.	"Never Never (Devilslug Remix)"	3:16
13.	"Never Never (Calvertron Remix)"	5:11
14.	"Never Never (Bro Safari X Ufo! Remix)"	4:09
Total length:		61:41

MP3 Download
No.	Title	Length
1.	"So Unfair"	3:14

Reconciliation (DVD)
No.	Title	Length
1.	"The Separation / The Seed"	13:14
2.	"Writing Sessions, Pt. 1"	6:38
3.	"Writing Sessions, Pt. 2"	5:47
4.	"Writing Sessions, Pt. 3"	9:50
5.	"Writing Sessions, Pt. 4"	1:47
6.	"Guitars Tracking"	4:06
7.	"Bass Tracking"	2:10
8.	"Drums Tracking"	3:30
9.	"Vocals Tracking, Pt. 1"	2:54
10.	"Vocals Tracking, Pt. 2"	7:33
11.	"The Tree"	2:57
Total length:		60:26

== Personnel ==
Korn

- Jonathan Davis – lead vocals, keyboards, programming
- James "Munky" Shaffer – guitars, backing vocals
- Brian "Head" Welch – guitars, backing vocals
- Reginald "Fieldy" Arvizu – bass
- Ray Luzier – drums

Other credits

- Don Gilmore – production, mixing
- Nightwatch – production ("Spike in My Veins")
- Jasen Rauch – additional production ("Love & Meth"), engineering, programming
- Mark Kiczula – engineering
- Zaylien – keyboards, programming
- Nick Suddarth – keyboards, programming
- Brad Blackwood – mastering
- Peter Katsis – A&R
- Roboto – cover art
- Sébastien Paquet – film director

== Charts ==
Chart (2013)	Peak position
Australian Albums (ARIA)	7
Austrian Albums (Ö3 Austria)	7
Belgian Albums (Ultratop Flanders)	31
Belgian Albums (Ultratop Wallonia)	25
Canadian Albums (Billboard)	9
Czech Albums (ČNS IFPI)	19
Danish Albums (Hitlisten)	20
Dutch Albums (Album Top 100)	38
Finnish Albums (Suomen virallinen lista)	22
French Albums (SNEP)	26
German Albums (Offizielle Top 100)	7
Hungarian Albums (MAHASZ)	29
Irish Albums (IRMA)	42
Italian Albums (FIMI)	28
Japanese Albums (Oricon)	20
New Zealand Albums (RMNZ)	22
Norwegian Albums (VG-lista)	28
Polish Albums (ZPAV)	11
Scottish Albums (Official Charts)	23
Spanish Albums (Promusicae)	70
Swedish Albums (Sverigetopplistan)	60
Swiss Albums (Schweizer Hitparade)	16
UK Albums (OCC)	16
UK Rock & Metal Albums (Official Charts)	1
US Billboard 200	8
US Independent Albums (Billboard)	1
US Top Alternative Albums (Billboard)	3
US Top Hard Rock Albums (Billboard)	1
US Top Rock Albums (Billboard)	3

== Certifications ==
Region	Certification	Certified units/sales
United Kingdom (BPI)	Gold	100,000^{‡}
^{‡} Sales+streaming figures based on certification alone.
