= Love and Death (band) =

American metal band

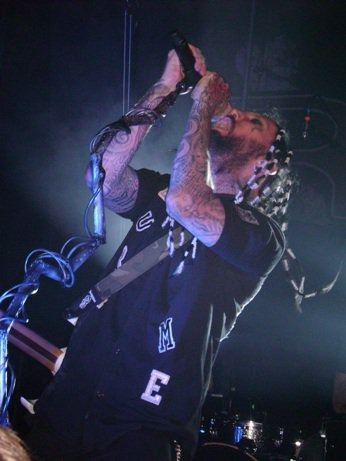
- Brian "Head" Welch performing live in Phoenix, Arizona, on November 23, 2010

Background information
- Origin: Phoenix, Arizona, U.S.
- Genres: Christian metal; nu metal; alternative metal
- Years active: 2012–present
- Labels: Tooth & Nail, Earache
- Members: Brian "Head" Welch; J.R. Bareis; Jasen Rauch; Isaiah Perez
- Past members: Michael Valentine; Dan Johnson
- Website: loveanddeathmusic.com

Love and Death is an American nu metal band formed by Korn guitarist Brian "Head" Welch. The group was officially announced in February 2012 as a re-branding of Welch's solo music project.

== History ==
=== Formation and early years (2009–2012) ===
The group is effectively a re-branding of the touring group that performed under Welch's name to promote his solo album. Formed in 2009, Welch recruited musicians through open auditions via YouTube, and second-round auditions, in person, at his studio in Phoenix, Arizona. The original group was a six-piece group, who featured Michael Valentine on bass, Ralph Patlan on guitar, Brian Ruedy on keyboards, Scott "SVH" Von Heldt on guitars and vocals and Dan Johnson on drums. After two years of touring, Von Heldt departed the band due to financial reasons, whereas Ruedy was let go a few months earlier and later joined Whitesnake. Patlan also departed the band, but no reason was given. The search began to find a guitar player. In March 2011, two weeks before a tour, Welch discovered "the perfect fit" for his band through Thousand Foot Krutch's public audition videos for a new guitarist on YouTube. 15 years old at the time, J.R. Bareis was chosen by Welch to be the new guitar player and became an official permanent member of the band, as they settled on establishing themselves as a four-piece. The group released a single, "Paralyzed" in November 2011, under the Brian "Head" Welch name. In February 2012, the touring band was re-branded into the group Love and Death.

Love and Death was formally announced in February 2012 through an official statement made by Welch. In the statement, Welch explained that "I have wanted to use a band name for branding my music for a few years. It has been an ongoing discussion with my management, but we were just starting to tour and I was in the middle of supporting my third book and it seemed like a bad time to switch names. Now with the new music coming out, it's time to really separate the things I do. I want the music to be about music. I will still be doing public speaking under Brian Head Welch. I am happy that all the confusion will be over". The name Love and Death was chosen because love and death are the two most significant things you can go through in life.

=== Chemicals EP, Between Here & Lost (2012–2015) ===
The band's debut single, "Chemicals", was released in early April, while their debut EP of the same name released on April 24, 2012. Welch revealed that they would be releasing a cover version of the song "Whip It" by Devo and a remix of "Paralyzed" by Har Meggido.

In late September 2012, the band announced that it had signed a deal with record label Tooth and Nail Records/EMI and that the group's debut album, Between Here & Lost would be released on November 20, however this was pushed back and released on January 22, 2013. On the album, Welch stated that "this record was birthed from trials, tribulations, pain, suffering, anxiety, depression, and drama. However, we came out on top and the end result is a very real, raw & honest record."

=== Perfectly Preserved (2016–present) ===
On March 15, 2016 a new single titled "Lo Lamento" was released. In August 2019, it was announced that Welch was recruiting musicians such as Jasen Rauch, Lacey Sturm and Spencer Chamberlain about appearing on his next work, thought to be the next Love and Death album.

On October 24, 2020, it was announced that the band had signed with extreme metal label Earache Records in order to release their new album in 2021. On Friday, November 13, 2020, the band released "Down", with a new lineup of Welch, Bareis, longtime friend, producer, and Breaking Benjamin guitarist Jasen Rauch on bass, and Phinehas drummer Isaiah Perez on drums. On January 8, 2021, the band released "White Flag" as the second single from Perfectly Preserved. It features sound similarities to both Korn and Breaking Benjamin. Ahead of the album's release Welch explained that the band was able to get together to create the new album, because their main musical projects were on hold due the COVID-19 pandemic. The album has sold 1,400 copies in its first week of release.

== Band members ==
Current members

- Brian "Head" Welch (Korn) – lead vocals, rhythm guitar (2012–present)
- JR Bareis (Spoken) – lead guitar, backing vocals (2012–present), co-lead vocals (2013–present), programming (2017–present)
- Jasen Rauch (Red, Breaking Benjamin) – bass, guitar, programming (2017–present)
- Isaiah Perez (Phinehas, Righteous Vendetta) – drums (2020–present)

Former members

- Michael Valentine – bass, backing vocals (2012–2016), guitar (2012)
- Dan Johnson (Red) – drums (2012–2017)

Timeline

== Discography ==
Love and Death discography
- Studio albums: 2
- Extended plays: 1
- Singles: 6
- Music videos: 6

Studio albums

List of studio albums, with selected chart positions
Title	Details	Peak chart positions				
Title	Details	US	US Christ.	US Hard Rock	US Rock	UK Rock & Metal
Between Here & Lost	Released: January 22, 2013 (US); Label: Tooth & Nail; Formats: CD, digital download	81	5	5	28	—
Perfectly Preserved	Released: February 12, 2021; Label: Earache; Formats: CD, digital download	52	—	4	—	9

Extended plays

List of extended plays
Title	Details
Chemicals EP	Released: April 24, 2012 (US); Label: Headdog; Formats: Digital download

Singles

List of singles, with selected chart positions, showing year released and album name
Title	Year	Peak chart positions			Album
Title	Year	US Sales	US Christ. Rock	US Main.	Album
"Chemicals"	2012	6	4	—	Between Here & Lost
"The Abandoning"	2012	—	6	—	Between Here & Lost
"Meltdown"	2013	—	14	—	Between Here & Lost
"Lo Lamento"	2016	—	—	—	Perfectly Preserved
"Down"	2020	—	—	26	Perfectly Preserved
"—" denotes a recording that did not chart or was not released in that territory.

Promotional singles

Title	Year	Album
"I W8 4 U"	2013	Between Here & Lost
"By the Way"	2013	Between Here & Lost
"White Flag"	2021	Perfectly Preserved
"The Hunter"	2021	Perfectly Preserved

Music videos

List of music videos, showing year released and director
Title	Year	Director(s)
"Paralyzed"	2011	
"Chemicals"	2012	Poab Design
"The Abandoning"	2012	Daniel Davison
"Meltdown"	2013	Behn Fannin
"Down"	2020	Sam Link
"Let Me Love You"	2021	Alison Roberto
