= Brian Welch =

American guitarist (born 1970)

Brian "Head" Welch
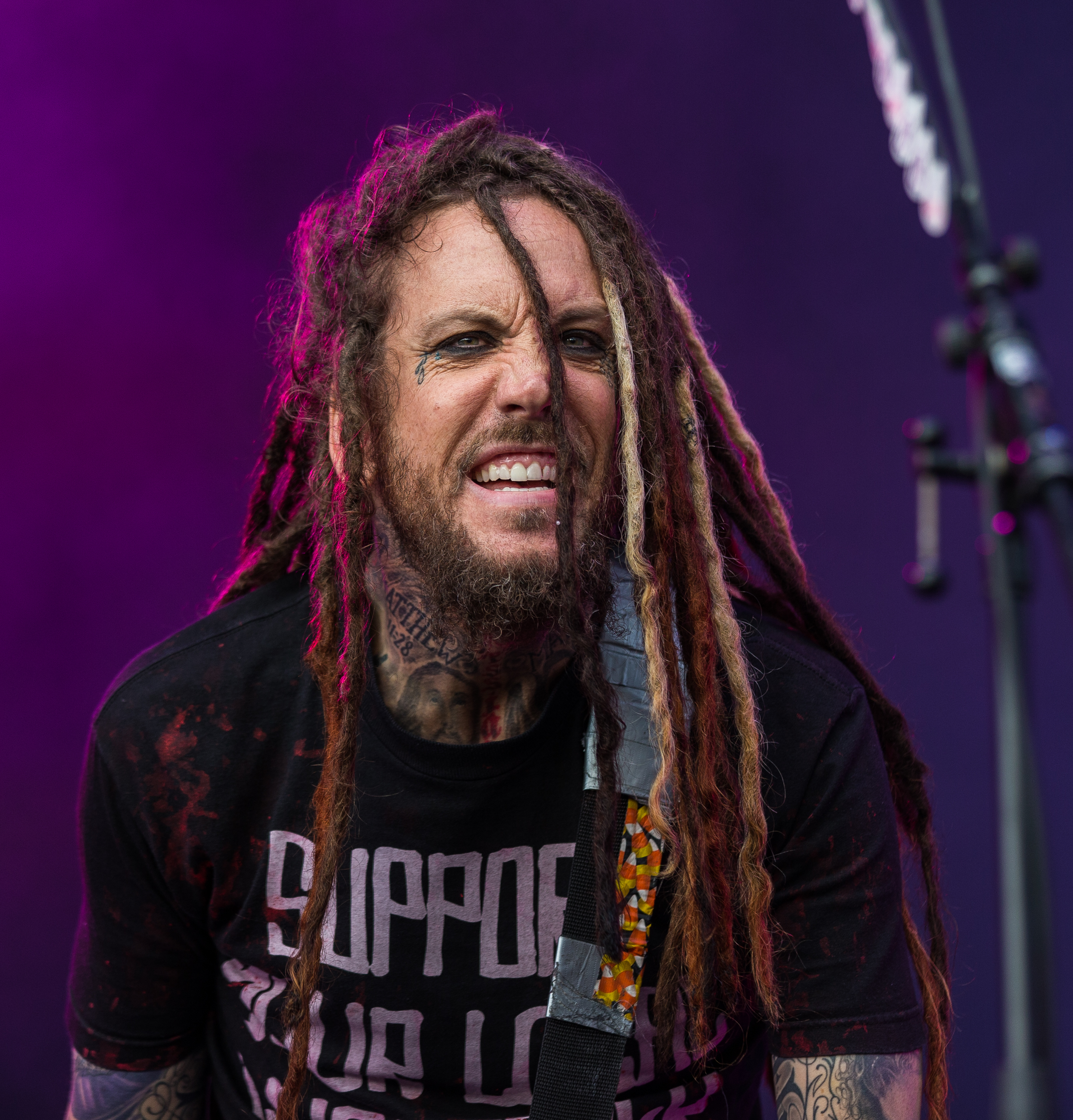
- Head during a show with Korn in 2014

Background information
- Also known as: Head; Sir Headly
- Born: Brian Philip Welch; June 19, 1970 (age 56); Los Angeles, California, U.S.
- Origin: Bakersfield, California, U.S.
- Genres: Nu metal; alternative metal; Christian metal
- Occupation: Musician
- Instruments: Guitar; vocals
- Years active: 1993–present
- Member of: Korn; Love and Death
- Website: brianheadwelch.net

Brian Philip Welch (born June 19, 1970), also known by his stage name Head, is an American musician. He is a guitarist and founding member of the nu metal band Korn and his solo project Love and Death, where he also provides vocals. Along with fellow Korn guitarist James "Munky" Shaffer, Welch helped develop Korn's distinctive sound (a mix of sirenlike shards of dissonant guitar that mimicked a turntablist's various effects and rumbling down-tuned riffing) that defined the nu metal aesthetic beginning in the mid-'90s.

After becoming a Christian, Welch left the band in 2005 to focus on life as a father and to pursue his own solo career. He released his debut Christian album, Save Me from Myself, in 2008. He reunited with Korn on-stage at the Carolina Rebellion in May 2012 for the first time in seven years; Welch officially announced in May 2013 that he was rejoining the band. Welch and Munky were ranked at No. 26 of Guitar World's 100 Greatest Heavy Metal Guitarists of All Time.

== Early life ==
Welch was born on June 19, 1970 at Kaiser Foundation Hospital in the Harbor City neighborhood of Los Angeles, California, though other sources have sited Welch's birthplace as Torrance, California. Welch was raised in Bakersfield. He was different from most kids, and was bullied in school. He liked music, and was a big Ozzy Osbourne fan. Originally, Welch expressed interest in playing the drums, but his father convinced him to play the guitar so he would not have to haul a drum kit around. He began playing the guitar at the age of 10. His first guitar was a Peavey Mystic, which he referred to in his book Save Me from Myself as "maybe the most metal-looking guitar you have ever seen."

Describing how he got his nickname "The Head", Welch stated,

"Guys said my head looked like it was too big for my body, and so they started calling me 'Head.' I guess it stuck".

== Korn (1993–2005, 2013–present) ==
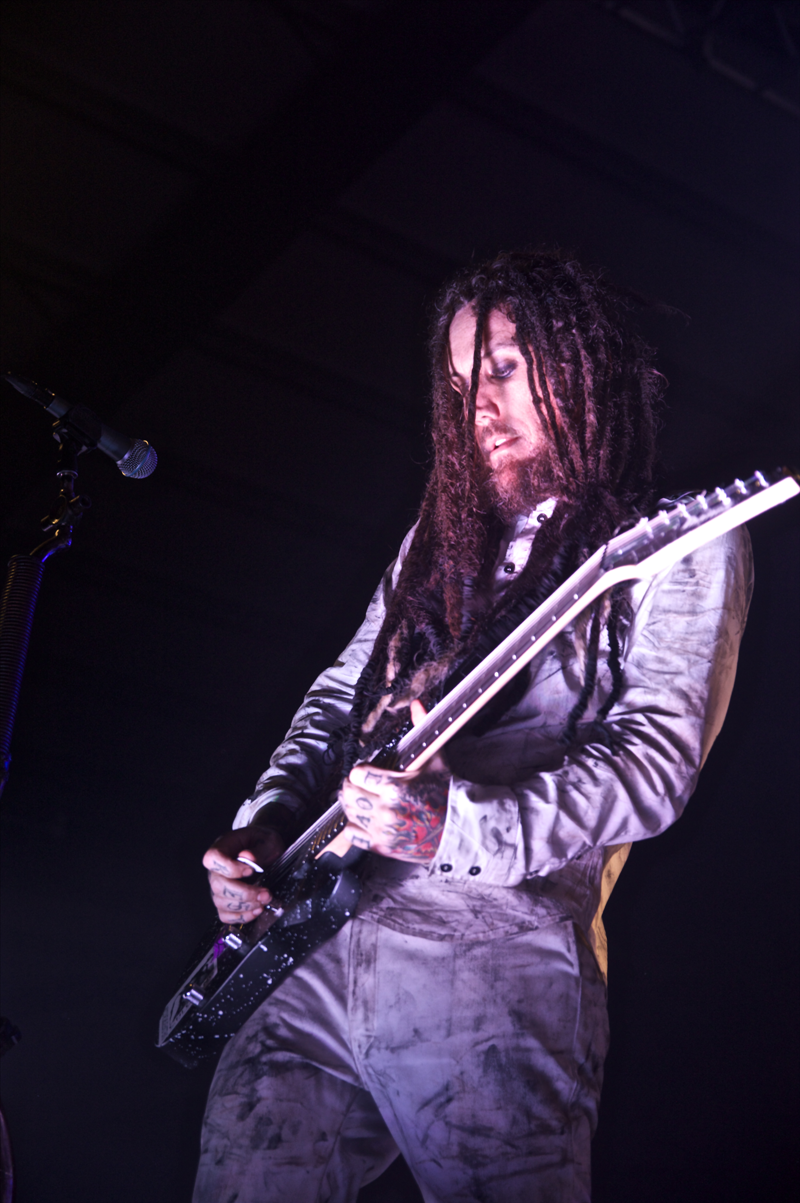
Welch performing with Korn in 2013

=== Formation ===
Korn formed after the group L.A.P.D. broke up due to singer Richard Morrill's drug addiction. Musicians Reginald Arvizu, James Shaffer, and David Silveria wanted to continue, and they hired Welch to play guitar in their new band named "Creep". In early 1993, the band took notice of vocalist Jonathan Davis after seeing his band Sexart and attempted to recruit him. Davis initially did not want to join the band, but after consulting a psychic he changed his mind and auditioned. After Davis was hired, the group decided to rename themselves. "Jonathan had an immediate idea for a new name. He suggested that we call the band "Korn," and we all liked it. It sounded kinda creepy because it reminded us of that horror movie Children of the Corn".

Starting with Korn's self-titled debut album and with subsequent albums Life Is Peachy, Follow The Leader, Issues, Untouchables, and Take A Look in the Mirror, the band gradually became one of the top-selling nu metal groups, earning $25 million in royalty payments and selling out arenas.

=== Conversion to Christianity and departure from Korn ===
On February 22, 2005, Korn's management announced that after almost 12 years, Welch had left Korn, citing that he had "...chosen the Lord Jesus Christ as his savior, and will be dedicating his musical pursuits to that end." In a 2009 radio interview with The Full Armor of God Broadcast, Welch explained: "I was walking one day, just doing my Rock & Roll thing making millions of bucks, you know success and everything, addicted to drugs and then the next day I had Revelation of Christ and I was like, everything changes right now!" On March 10, 2005, Welch was baptized in the Jordan River with a group of believers from his church in Bakersfield, California. He declared that he rid himself of all drugs in his "own personal rehab" with God, in which he had checked into a hotel room and sat in his bed for hours.

Welch and Davis attacked each other in the media after the former's departure. After Welch said that Davis and the rest of Korn cared only about money, Davis responded in kind, opening a rift between them that has since been resolved. In an interview in which Welch was asked about his book and Korn's reaction to the book and the attacks in the media he made earlier at the band:

They heard that I'd written it, and there was rumors going around in Hollywood that I was totally trashing them and that it was a 'tell all' book about everything they did and I did. And so they actually wrote two songs on their new album bashing me about the book. But once I heard that they were concerned about the book, I sent them a copy and put a note in there and said, 'I love you guys. I didn't trash you like people say. Read it yourselves. It is what it is.' And now they're doing interviews, and I've read that they're totally cool with the book, and it's not what they thought it was going to be. So everyone's happy. But, now they've got two songs hating on me on their record. But it's cool. It's all good. I love them, they love me. I think maybe I deserved those songs because of some of the stuff that I said after I quit the band. So it's all good.

In July 2005, Welch appeared on CNN's feature-format program "People in the News", where he admitted to having been addicted to alcohol, methamphetamine, Xanax, and sleeping pills before being introduced to the Christian faith. In a podcast with Headbanger's Blog, on May 30, 2008, Korn vocalist Jonathan Davis expressed interest in playing with Welch on the band's upcoming album, but stated that it is not likely. In September 2009, Korn guitarist Munky, in an interview with Altitude TV, alleged that the band had denied a request by Welch to rejoin the outfit. In the interview, Munky claimed:

Brian actually contacted us recently and wanted to come back to the band. And it was not the right time... for us. We're doing well, and it's kind of like... It's kind of like if you divorced your wife and she went on and she stayed successful and her career flourished, and you go back and [say], 'My gosh, she's still hot. Baby, can we get back together?' 'Wait a minute... All the stuff's been divided, and it's like...' I don't see it happening right now.

Shortly after, Welch responded to the statement via his Myspace and official website, denying the claims:

I recently learned of an interview that Munky gave where he said that I came to Korn and asked to be taken back in the band. That's definitely not a complete and accurate picture. The full truth is that for about a year... Korn's managers have been requesting my manager to work on getting me back into Korn. The calls were initiated by Korn's managers, not my manager. I shut the door on their requests many, many times over the last several months.

As far as Munky's comment that 'everything has been divided already' that is also not accurate. In fact, from January 2005 when I left, and for the next 4 years, Korn failed to pay to me royalties that were due me on records that I did with them. However, I don't believe this was done intentionally. We are trying to be patient and work with their management to get the financial issues resolved so that 'everything can be divided as we agreed long ago in our contracts.'

Welch told Alternative Press magazine that it was at this time that he had essentially become broke because of bad business deals, mismanagement, and philanthropy. Welch stated there was a time that he was unable to pay his bills and resorted to finding loose change around his rental home to cover essentials. A royalty cheque was released to him not long after, allowing him some stability.

In an interview with Loudwire in November 2011, Head confirmed that he and the other members of Korn were still on good terms.

=== Reunion with Korn ===
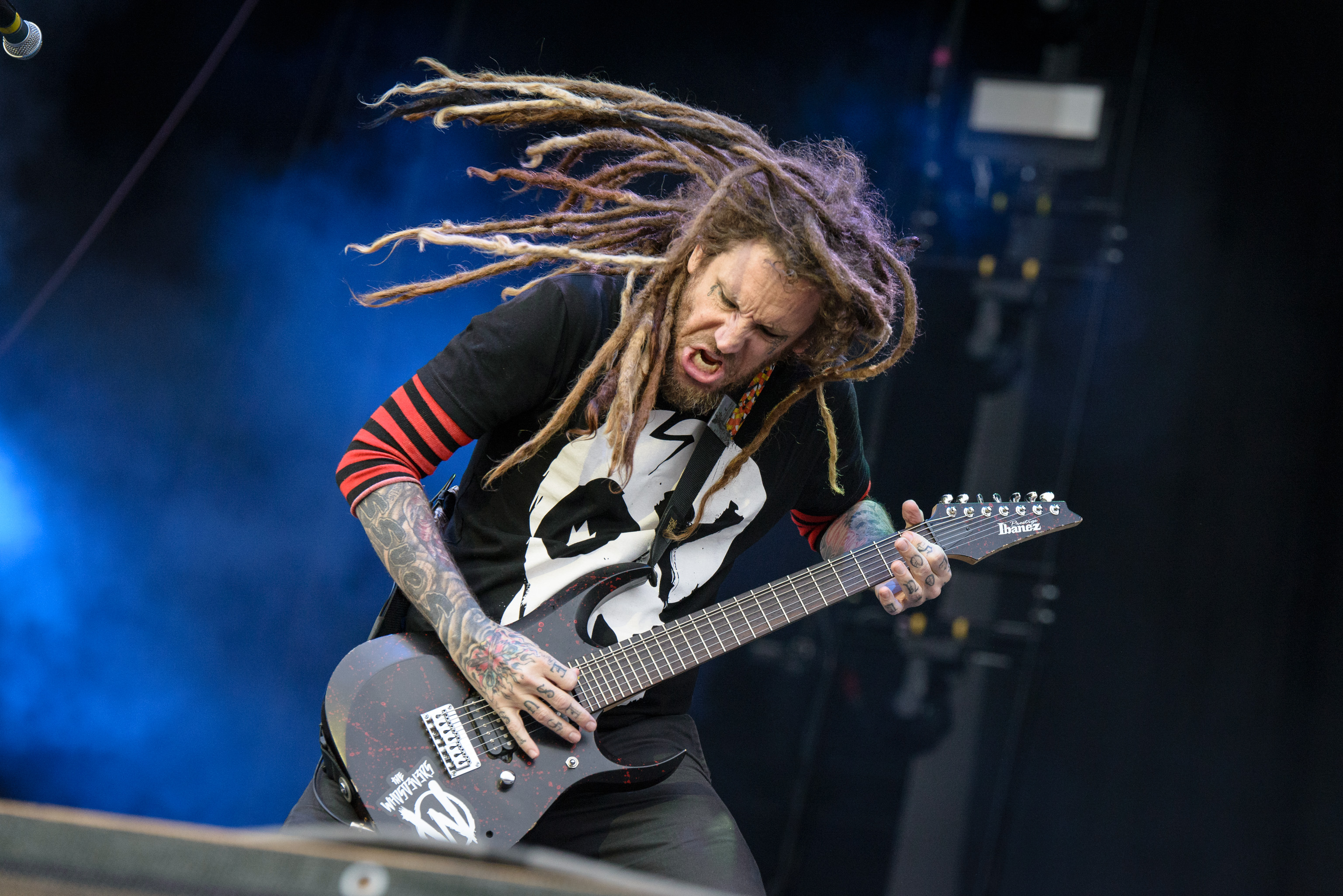
Head playing with Korn at Rock im Park 2016

On May 5, 2012, at the Carolina Rebellion in Rockingham, NC, Welch was there originally as a special guest for a performance by P.O.D. Later that evening, Korn was performing on the main stage and Jonathan Davis brought out Welch as a special guest to close their act, marking the first time Welch had performed with Korn since his departure in 2005.

Welch performed with the band at Rock on the Range in May 2013, as well as Rock Am Ring and Rock Im Park in June 2013 in Germany, as well as Download Festival in England. After much speculation and further touring announcements with the band, Welch officially rejoined Korn on May 2, 2013, and recorded his first album with the band in ten years, The Paradigm Shift.

== Solo career (2005–present) ==
=== Save Me from Myself ===
As early as a week following his departure from Korn, Welch claimed through press that a solo record was close to being completed, although there was no release date given, nor had he yet signed on with a label to distribute the record.

A number of demos from these early sessions surfaced on peer-to-peer networks, among them "A Cheap Name", a song directed at rapper 50 Cent. He also recorded several other songs, including "Dream" and "A Letter to Dimebag", the latter being an instrumental tribute to "Dimebag" Darrell Abbott, guitarist for heavy metal bands Pantera and Damageplan. In his autobiography, Welch mentions the songs "Washed by Blood," "Save Me from Myself," and "Rebel", which all have made the final track listing for the album.

In an interview with MTV News, Welch clarified a few things. Primarily, he was concerned that it was reported that his new songs wouldn't be "Christian music".

During his stay in Israel with members of the Valley Bible Fellowship of Bakersfield, California, Welch continued to write songs for his solo effort, confident that the music would speak for itself. "I want to make music that will help people. I want to use every dime of the money I make off the songs to build skate parks for kids," he said. "My life now is about helping kids." Originally, Welch contacted Fieldy of Korn to produce the album, but Fieldy made no response.

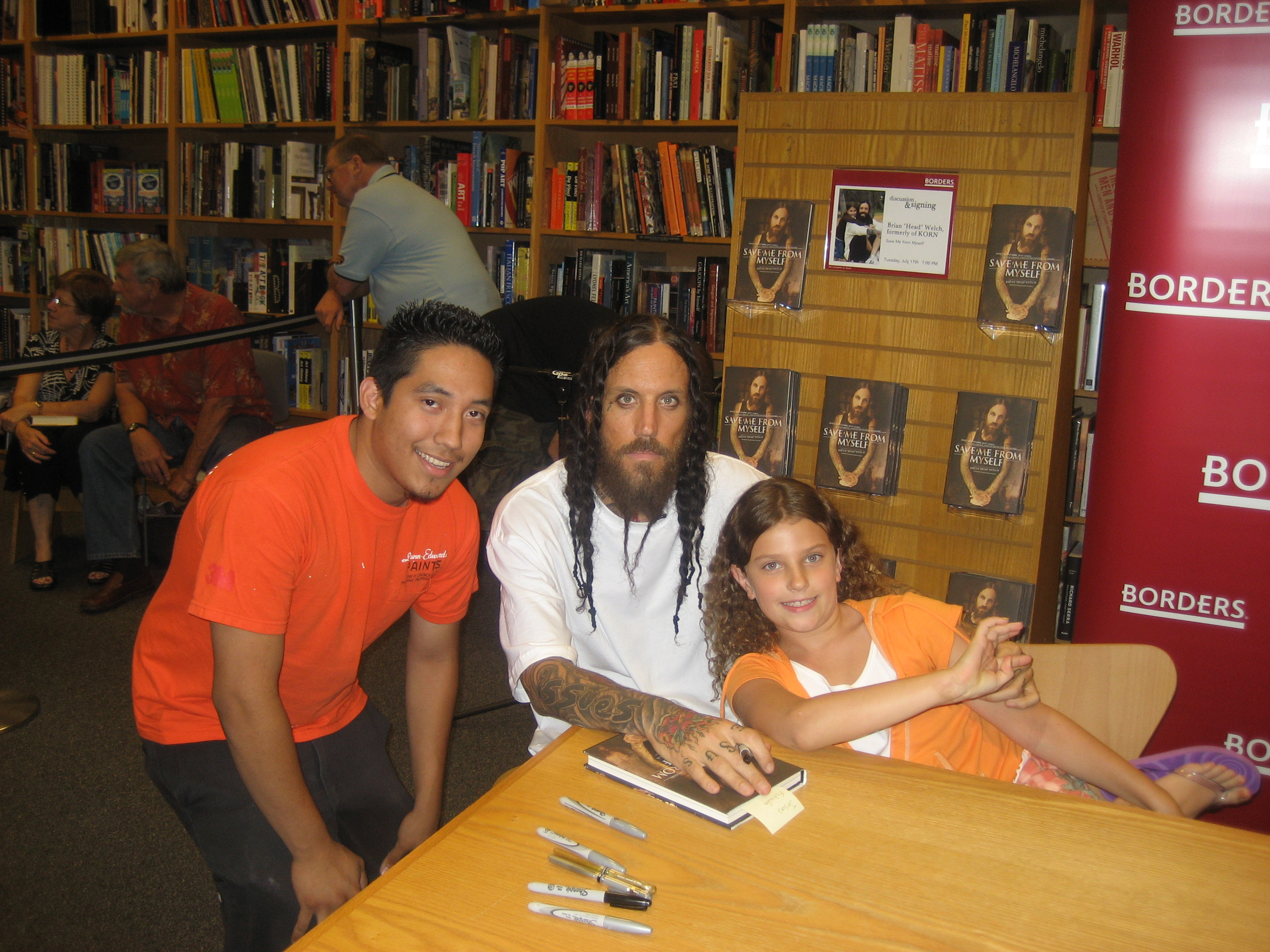
Brian Welch signing his autobiography Save Me From Myself (2007)

On March 15, 2008, Welch announced he had founded a record company with Mark Nawara and Greg Shanabeger called Driven Music Group. The company's artists are distributed by Warner Music Group and Rykodisc. Welch also announced that he had re-dubbed his album Save Me from Myself, after his autobiography of the same name. Following this, his official MySpace profile went online, and the domain name for his official website was moved from www.headtochrist.com to www.brianheadwelch.net. Welch also revealed that a tour was expected to follow the release of Save Me from Myself.

For the album, Welch contributed the majority of the instruments, but also hired other contributors, including rhythm guitarist Archie J. Muise Jr., bassist Tony Levin, and drummer Josh Freese, for assistance. The first single, Flush, was released on July 5, 2008, at Cornerstone Festival in Bushnell, Illinois, and a music video directed by Frankie Nasso followed on September 5.

Originally, Welch planned for the project to follow the "Head" name, but was persuaded otherwise so as not to be sued by the tennis equipment manufacturer of the same name. Though the project has since been dubbed "Brian Head Welch", the album art continues to carry the imprint of the project's original title. The project's true title does appear on the spines of the packaging.

Of the album, Welch said:

"I knew it was going to be nothing near as big as Korn, but I was proud of it. It's got some heavy riffs and it's got a lot more emotion than I've ever put in music. I'm an emotional guy (and) it was cool to be able to put it in there. It was cool how people were surprised by it. A lot of people thought I was gonna come out with some 'Kumbaya,' Jesus music."

For his live touring band, Welch held closed and open auditions to recruit members. Members posted videos online of them performing Welch's solo songs and the list was narrowed down to a few who did a personal audition with Welch. Eventually, the lineup was finalized to include Brian Ruedy (Keyboards), Scott "SVH" Von Heldt (guitar & backing vocals), Ralph Patlan (guitar), Michael "Valentine" (bass), and Dan Johnson (drums).

Along with many other artists, including ex-Korn bandmates Fieldy and Munky, Welch contributed to "A Song for Chi". The instrumental track was to benefit Deftones bassist Chi Cheng, who was in a coma but later died. All the profits benefited the "One Love for Chi" foundation. This was the first time Head was involved with any of his former bandmates since leaving the band.

In 2009, Welch joined the 9th annual Independent Music Awards judging panel to assist independent musicians' careers.

On July 2, 2009, Welch headlined the mainstage of the Cornerstone Festival and on August 29, Welch headlined the Exit Concert in Las Vegas at the Thomas and Mack Arena with Blindside and Flyleaf. On July 3, 2010, he was featured on the Fringe stage of the Creation Festival.

Welch has often described his solo project as being received very differently from Korn. Despite his fame with Korn, he has compared his solo project to 'starting over': "It's a struggle, because one show I'll have a thousand people there, and the next show there'll be a hundred. When the hundred is there, I'm like, 'There's one or two people who really need us to be here,' and it should be focused on them and I shouldn't care if there's a big crowd or not, but I struggle with it. I was in Korn and we sold like 25 million albums, and I can't even fill this little bar up? Of all those fans, 300–400 people can't just show up here? It's like starting over, totally."

Save Me From Myself peaked at No. 63 on the Billboard 200 while also peaking at 13 and 21 on the Hard Rock and Rock charts, respectively.

=== Unreleased songs ===
According to an interview with the Great Falls Tribune, Welch returned to the studio to begin work on a second album. Concerning his career at the time, Welch said that

"I feel like I was created to do what I'm doing right now. Everything I learned in my life before I changed it all over, it set me up for what I'm doing now. That's the satisfaction. That's the peace in knowing, without a doubt, that you're on the road you're supposed to be on. There's nothing more content than that."

In November 2009, Welch announced that his second effort would be produced by Grammy-nominee Rob Graves (Red, Pillar), and that the band was recording in Nashville, expecting to complete the record by February 2010. Of recording with Graves, Welch stated that "the production on our new record is going awesome with Rob Graves. Our goal is to get the record completely mixed and mastered by the first part of February, and released immediately thereafter. My band is together, helping with the recording, and we will be ready for a full U.S. tour beginning early next year." Welch also signed an international representational deal with William Morris Endeavor Entertainment. On signing the deal with WMEE, Welch said that "I'm really excited about my deal with William Morris Endeavor, and I'm honored to be on the roster of one of the largest and most storied agencies in existence. I would like to publicly thank Ember Rigsby Tanksley and her entire team at WMEE for their belief in what I am trying to do. I feel like this is the final piece in the puzzle that we have been working on to take us to the next level."

In addition, Welch signed with Union Entertainment Group, Inc., for management in early 2010.

According to Welch in April 2010, he has finished a demo of a record for the songs, but has yet to re-enter the studio to complete the recording process as he is on tour in the United States. The band has been playing a number of unreleased songs live from the demo of the record including the following songs:

- Runaway
- Bury Me, Resurrected
- Take This From Me
- Torment

The CD was expected to be released sometime during April 2012, But it has yet to be released.

On March 25, 2011, Welch started a North American tour with Decyfer Down, The Letter Black, and The Wedding.

=== Chemicals EP ===
Welch and his band went into the studio with Jasen Rauch in early/mid-2011 to start recording an EP. The lead single, "Paralyzed", was released on October 4, 2011. The "making of" video for "Paralyzed" was posted on Welch's Facebook fan page, along with a streaming of the full "Paralyzed" track. The music video for "Paralyzed" was released on Revolver's website on November 8, 2011. In February 2012, Welch announced that the EP would be released under the name "Love and Death", the new moniker for his solo project.

=== Split with record label ===
On March 22, 2011, Welch got into a legal battle with his own label, Driven Music Group, and former managers Greg Shanaberger and Mark Nawara. According to Welch, Shanaberger structured Head Touring, Welch's touring company under Driven Music, to give himself and Nawara share of control and revenue. Shanaberger's agreements required Welch to buy merchandise through Head Touring at an inflated price which was far above industry standards, "for which Shanaberger and Nawara reaped the benefits," claims Welch. Welch also claims that Shanaberger attempted to hide "his fraudulent, unethical and illegal behavior" by listing his then fiancée as a shareholder. Welch claims that the agreements were "predatory, unconscionable, and constitutes self-dealing" and that they were written with the intention to "rob Welch of his master recordings, which were worth upwards of $600,000." Welch is seeking punitive damages, the appointment of a receiver, the dissolution of Driven Music Group, and costs.

=== Love and Death ===
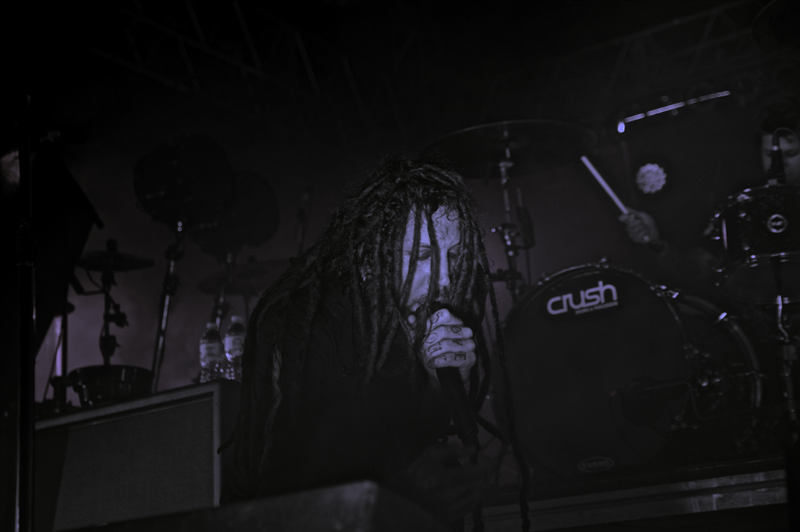
Love & Death's first show opening for Korn on the reunion tour 2013

In February 2012, Welch announced that he was re-branding his music under the name Love and Death, effectively forming a band under that name. In an official statement, Welch elaborated on the name and the change:

The name "Love and Death" symbolizes everything we've been through as a band over the last few years. We love this band so much and we'll go through hell to connect with our fans. Many people have confused my speaking dates and our band dates because they were both being booked as Brian Head Welch. I have wanted to use a band name for branding my music for a few years. Now with the new music coming out, its [sic] time to really separate the things I do. I want the music to be about music. I will still be doing public speaking under Brian Head Welch. I am happy that all the confusion will be over.

The band's debut single, "Chemicals", was released in March, while an EP of the same name was released on April 24, 2012.

A full-length album, Between Here & Lost, was released on January 22, 2013.

Despite rejoining Korn permanently in 2013, Welch has clarified that Love and Death will remain an active project. On May 17, 2016, Love and Death released a new single, "Lo Lamento", as a free-download with the purchase of his book, With My Eyes Wide Open: Miracles & Mistakes on My Way Back to KoRn.

=== HolyName ===
Welch was among the live lineup for metal worship project HolyName, a group led by former Sleeping Giant frontman Tommy Green. Their live recording, Initiation, performed in Chicago, was recorded and released in July 27, 2023.

== Other media ==
In 2003, Welch made an appearance at WWE's flagship event WrestleMania 19 performing with Limp Bizkit in their song "Rollin' (Air Raid Vehicle)", Welch filled in as Limp Bizkit's touring guitarist for several dates in early 2003.

In 2018, Welch released a documentary, Loud Krazy Love, detailing his early life and raising his daughter.

In 2020, Welch and Dr. Matt O’Neill, a physical therapist who toured with Korn, co-founded Zivel, a wellness company focused on assisting recovery from physical and emotional traumas.

On December 6, 2023, Welch unveiled XOVR Records, a new record label he created with longtime manager David Williams, and announced Christian rock band Spoken as his first signees.

== Musical equipment ==
Welch's first guitar was a Peavey Mystic, which he later sold along with a practice amp to future bandmate James "Munky" Shaffer. Throughout his career with Korn, Welch almost exclusively played Ibanez guitars, most of which were assembled at the Ibanez LA Custom Shop.

During his later days with Korn, Welch and Munky played their own signature guitar, the Ibanez K7. Since leaving Korn, Welch mostly uses custom-built baritone guitars from Ibanez, making use of the RG and, at the time, newly introduced RGD shape. After rejoining Korn in 2013, Welch received several custom-made Ibanez seven-string RGDs.

In 2017, Welch switched endorsement from Ibanez to ESP Guitars after being with the former for 24 years. He released his first ESP signature model called the SH-7ET. In the beginning of 2025, Welch switched back to Ibanez.

Welch's pedalboard has grown considerably from his early days with Korn. He considers experimenting and trying out new pedals to be one of his favorite things to do when working in a studio.

== Personal life ==
=== Family ===
From 1998 to 2001, Welch was married to his wife Rebekah. They had two children together, but gave up their first child, born in 1995, for adoption. They raised their second child, Jennea Marie Welch (b. July 6, 1998). Korn was scheduled to be on the UK version of Ozzfest but dropped out so that Welch could be present for Jennea's birth. After they divorced, Welch received full custody of Jennea. Despite being divorced, Welch kept in touch with his ex-wife until her death in June 2021.

Welch currently resides in Arizona along with Jennea.

=== Drug and alcohol addiction ===
Welch began his addiction to drugs and alcohol when he was 14, and continued in his early years with Korn; by 2003 he hit his peak in addiction. He would prepare for tours by stashing as much methamphetamine as he could in vitamin capsules, deodorant containers, and his clothes. According to Welch, the band members also suffered personal battles with addiction: "We were only sober for just a couple of hours a day in Korn. Every day. And then when you come home and you've got to deal with real life and your wife isn't having that, crap goes down." Despite his dreams coming true, Welch did not enjoy the touring life with Korn.

You travel, you get to another town, you play a show and you do it again. You try to just be at peace but even a big, huge band like Korn, playing in front of thousands of people, it can get lonely. You feel like you're a trucker and you're traveling with a bunch of truckers. You can't connect with people except for the ones that you're with because the ones you party with after the show, you don't know them and then you're gone. When everyone's drunk, you're like 'Alright. Later.'

After his conversion to Christianity in 2005, Welch has maintained sobriety.

=== Christianity ===
Welch first encountered Christianity while in Bakersfield in 2004, when he met a group of Christians and reluctantly attended a local church with them, figuring he had nothing to lose. At the church, the pastor's message moved him, and he recalled feeling God speak to him. One of the driving forces in his conversion and sobriety was coming home after a bender to find Jennea, then a toddler, singing Korn's "A.D.I.D.A.S.". "I felt like such a loser and a horrible father. I’m no good for this kid—All the years of the drugs, all the years of the pornography, it was all about me, me, me, me, and this little girl came, and I wanted to be the best dad. I wanted to be, I had the heart to be the best dad I could, but I couldn't. And when Christ came into my life, I just said, 'Look, take me. I'm yours. Do what you want with me. But I need you to make me a good father.' He was baptized in 2005, and in 2008 with other celebrities such as Josh Hamilton and Greg Ellis, appeared in testimonial videos called I Am Second in which he shared his story of recovering from drug use with the help of his faith.

In 2021, Welch stated that while he is still a Christian, he had gone "too far with it", feeling like he had turned it into another addiction. However, in another interview he added that this quote was taken out of context by media outlets and that he had not renounced Christianity like they were reporting, only toning down in approach. He maintains that faith in Christ is still the foundation of his life, and continues to discuss his faith and spiritual topics.

Welch has shown compassion for the LGBTQ community. In 2016, after receiving backlash by some Christian fans for praying for a transgender fan who asked for their prayers, he wrote a Facebook post criticizing the judgemental nature of certain Christians and encouraged them to "open their hearts". He wrote:

"They are experiencing non-judgmental Jesus lovers who are planting seeds and speaking life into them. Some of them are having instant change, but for most of them, it's going to take some time. Many tears are being shed and their hearts are softening. Each heartless post from you judgmental ones are only helping to harden their hearts to Jesus once again. The gospel of Christ isn't like fast food. Not everyone has an overnight dramatic conversion like mine. Often times the relationship with God takes hold many years or even a decade or more later. When you religious people try to force instant repentance and point out people's flaws, you are dismantling what God is trying to do inside of hearts."

=== Charity work ===
Following his conversion in 2005, Welch went to some of the more poverty-stricken areas of India to build orphanages, or "Head Homes".

In 2008, Welch became a principal organizer and representative of The Whosoevers, an outreach organization and product line co-founded by Sonny Sandoval of P.O.D. and public speaker, Ryan Ries. The group includes musicians in other alternative/nu metal bands such as Lacey Sturm of Flyleaf, as well as freestyle motocross athlete, Ronnie Faisst. Sandoval and Ries speak publicly worldwide in settings such as schools, rehab centers, parks, conferences and youth events inspiring individuals who are eager to discover their purpose.

== Discography ==
=== Korn ===
- Korn (1994)
- Life Is Peachy (1996)
- Follow the Leader (1998)
- Issues (1999)
- Untouchables (2002)
- Take a Look in the Mirror (2003)
- The Paradigm Shift (2013)
- The Serenity of Suffering (2016)
- The Nothing (2019)
- Requiem (2022)

=== Love and Death ===
- Chemicals (April 24, 2012)
- Between Here & Lost (January 22, 2013)
- Perfectly Preserved (February 12, 2021)

=== Music videos ===
- "Blind" (Korn) with Korn – 1995
- "Shoots and Ladders" (Korn) with Korn – 1995
- "Clown" (Korn) with Korn – 1996
- "No Place to Hide" (Life Is Peachy) with Korn – 1996
- "A.D.I.D.A.S." (Life Is Peachy) with Korn – 1997
- "Good God" (Life Is Peachy) with Korn – 1997
- "Got the Life" (Follow the Leader) with Korn – 1998
- "Faith by Limp Bizkit - 1998 (cameo)
- "Freak on a Leash" (Follow the Leader) with Korn – 1999
- "Falling Away from Me" (Issues) with Korn – 1999
- "Make Me Bad" (Issues) with Korn – 2000
- "Somebody Someone" (Issues) with Korn – 2000
- "Here to Stay" (Untouchables) with Korn – 2002
- "Thoughtless" (Untouchables) with Korn – 2002
- "Alone I Break" (Untouchables) with Korn – 2002
- "Did My Time" (Take a Look in the Mirror) with Korn – 2003
- "Right Now" (Take a Look in the Mirror) with Korn – 2003
- "Y'All Want a Single" (Take a Look in the Mirror) with Korn – 2004
- "Word Up!" (Greatest Hits, Vol 1) with Korn – 2004
- "Another Brick in the Wall" (Greatest Hits, Vol 1) with Korn – 2004
- "Flush" (Save Me From Myself) as Head – 2008
- "Paralyzed" (Paralyzed Single) as Head – 2011
- "Chemicals" (Chemicals -EP) with Love and Death – 2012
- "The Abandoning" (Between Here & Lost) with Love and Death – 2013
- "Meltdown" (Between Here & Lost) with Love and Death – 2013
- "Never Never" (The Paradigm Shift) with Korn – 2013
- "Love & Meth" (The Paradigm Shift) with Korn – 2014
- "Spike in My Veins" (The Paradigm Shift) with Korn – 2014
- "Rotting in Vain" (The Serenity of Suffering) with Korn – 2016
- "Insane" (The Serenity of Suffering) with Korn – 2016
- "Take Me" (The Serenity of Suffering) with Korn – 2016
- "Black Is the Soul" (The Serenity of Suffering) with Korn – 2017
- "You'll Never Find Me" (The Nothing) with Korn – 2019
- "Can You Hear Me" (The Nothing) with Korn – 2020
- "Finally Free" (The Nothing) with Korn – 2020
- "Start the Healing" (Requiem) with Korn – 2021
- "Down” (Perfectly Preserved) with Love and Death - 2021
- “Let Me Love You” (Perfectly Preserved) with Love and Death feat. Lacey Sturm – 2021
- "Fall On Your Knees" with HolyName- 2023

=== Other appearances ===
- War & Peace Vol. 1 (appears on "Fuck Dying" with KoRn) (1998)
- Videodrone (appears on "Power Tools for Girls") (1999)
- Queen of the Damned Soundtrack (2002)
- Rock'n Roll Gangster (appears on Korn Gigglebox & Special K Buzz) (2002)
- A Song for Chi (2009)
- Wait for the Siren by Project 86 (appears on "The Crossfire Gambit") (guest vocals) (2012)
- A Killer's Confession (2016)
- A Killer's Confession (appears on the "Unbroken"
- Elements by Caliban (appears on "Masquerade") (2018)
- Amends by Grey Daze (appears on "B12" and "She Shines") (2020)
- "KIDS" by We Are PIGS (single) (2021)
- Skin Crawl by Islander (appears on "It's Not Easy Being Human") (2022)
- Initiation: Live in Chicago by HolyName (appears on "Fall On Your Knees") (2023)
- Reflection by Spoken (appears on "Anymore") (2024)

=== As solo musician ===
==== Studio albums ====
Title	Details	Peak chart positions				
Title	Details	US	US Christ.	US Indie.	US Rock	NZ
Save Me from Myself	Released: September 9, 2008; Label: Driven Music Group, Warner Music Group, Rykodisc; Formats: CD, LP, digital download, streaming	63	3	7	21	27

==== Singles ====
===== As lead artist =====
Title	Year	Album
"Flush"	2008	Save Me From Myself
"Re-bel"	2009	Save Me From Myself
"Paralyzed"	2011	Non-album single

===== As featured artist =====
Title	Year	Peak chart positions		Album
Title	Year	US Christ Rock	US Main. Rock	Album
"The Crossfire Gambit" (Project 86 featuring Brian "Head Welch)	2012	—	—	Wait for the Siren
"Kids" (We Are PIGS featuring Brian "Head Welch)	2021	—	—	Non-album single
"Skin Crawl" (Islander featuring Korn and Brian "Head" Welch)	2022	—	—	It's Not Easy Being Human
"Anymore" (Spoken featuring Brian "Head" Welch")	2024	—	—	Reflection
"Defiler" (Zahna featuring Brian "Head" Welch)	2025	1	40	Non-album single
"—" denotes a recording that did not chart or was not released in that territory.

== Bibliography ==
- Save Me from Myself: How I Found God, Quit KoRn, Kicked Drugs, and Lived to Tell My Story (2007, 2008)
- Washed By Blood: Lessons from My Time with KoRn and My Journey to Christ (2008)
- Stronger: Forty Days of Metal and Spirituality (2010)
- With My Eyes Wide Open: Miracles and Mistakes on My Way Back to KoRn (2016)

== Filmography ==
- Who Then Now? (1997)
- Family Values Tour (1998)
- South Park "Korn's Groovy Pirate Ghost Mystery" as himself (1999)
- Deuce (2002)
- Korn Live (2002)
- MTV Icon: Metallica (2003)
- WWE WrestleMania (2003)
- Live at Montreux 2004 (2008)
- Holy Ghost (2014)
- Loud Krazy Love (2018)
