= Driven Music Group =

Driven Music Group was a record label founded by Korn guitarist Brian "Head" Welch, Mark Nawara and Greg Shanaberger. The company has a distribution deal with Warner Music Group.

== Current artists ==
Driven Madness
Flotsam & Jetsam
Godhead
Even The Dogs
Embracing Goodbye

== Former artists ==
Crossbreed
Brian Head Welch

== See also ==
- List of record labels
