= Save Me from Myself =

2007 autobiography by Brian "Head" Welch

Save Me from Myself: How I Found God, Quit Korn, Kicked Drugs, and Lived to Tell My Story
- Front cover
- Author: Brian "Head" Welch
- Language: English
- Genre: Autobiography
- Publisher: HarperOne
- Publication date: July 3, 2007
- Publication place: United States
- Media type: Print hardback, paperback, e-book
- Pages: 225 (hardcover)
- Followed by: Washed by Blood

Save Me from Myself: How I Found God, Quit Korn, Kicked Drugs, and Lived to Tell My Story is the autobiography of Korn guitarist Brian "Head" Welch. It chronicles his life from childhood, to his days with Korn, his addiction to drugs, his embrace of a life of living for God, and the beginning of his solo career.

In the U.S., the hardcover was published on July 1, 2007, and the paperback on June 24, 2008 (HarperOne). In the U.K., the hardcover was published on July 1, 2007 (HarperOne), and the paperback on July 1, 2008 (HarperSanFrancisco). Save Me from Myself was followed in 2008 by the "clean" reprint Washed by Blood.

== Reception ==
The book premiered at the 25th position on the New York Times Best Seller list. and on July 29, 2007, the book was at number 15 as of that week, being one week on the list.

== Chapter listing ==
- "Author's Note"
- "Prologue"

"Part I: To Hell and Back"

1. "Life Begins in Bako"
2. "It All Comes Together"
3. "The Final Piece"
4. "It Starts to Come Apart"
5. "Life Changes"
6. "I Fall to Pieces"
7. "...And Get Put Back Together"

"Part II: Heaven on Earth"

8. "I Go Public"
9. "Tongues"
10. "Head Hunting in India"
11. "Into the Desert"
12. " I Go Through Hell Again"
- "Epilogue"
- "Acknowledgements"

== Washed by Blood ==
Washed by Blood: Lessons from My Time with Korn and My Journey to Christ
- Front cover
- Author: Brian "Head" Welch
- Language: English
- Genre: Autobiography
- Publisher: HarperOne
- Publication date: June 24, 2008
- Publication place: United States
- Media type: Print paperback
- Pages: 224
- Preceded by: Save Me from Myself

Washed by Blood: Lessons from My Time with Korn and My Journey to Christ is the second autobiography of the former Korn guitarist, Brian "Head" Welch. It is a "clean" version of Welch's 2007 memoir, Save Me from Myself, re-adapted without the profanity and gory details of the original story for a younger audience. It is a young adult companion to his bestseller, sharing his inspirational story of rock, addiction and redemption with Christian teens across the US. In the book, Welch discusses his consuming addiction to methamphetamine, and how Christ released him from his drug addiction.
