= Jasen Rauch =

American guitarist, songwriter and producer

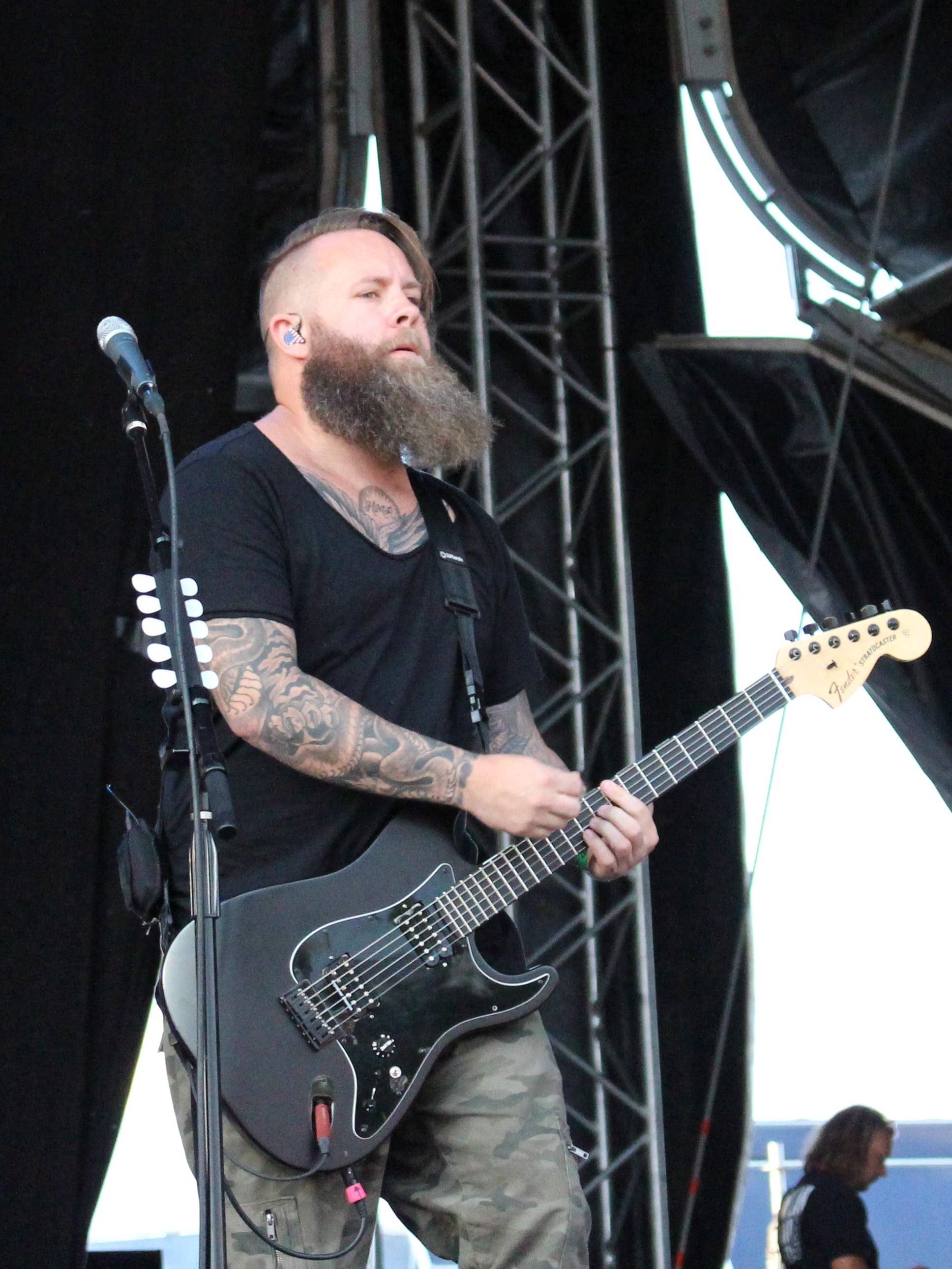
- Rauch at Frequency Festival 2017

Background information
- Born: Jasen Ryan Rauch; April 24, 1981 (age 44)
- Origin: American
- Genres: Alternative rock; alternative metal; post-grunge; Christian rock; Christian metal
- Occupations: Musician, songwriter, record producer
- Instruments: Guitar

Jasen Ryan Rauch (/ˈraʊ/) (born April 24, 1981) is an American musician, songwriter and record producer. He is the current lead guitarist of the rock band Breaking Benjamin and was the former lead guitarist of the Christian rock band Red. Rauch was also the producer for Korn guitarist Brian Welch's solo project, Love and Death, before becoming the band's bassist in 2020. According to Welch, Rauch "has a great track record for recording, producing, writing, and being in a band", and credits him as an inspiration for his returning to music. Before joining Breaking Benjamin in late 2014, Rauch also co-wrote several songs on their 2009 Dear Agony album, including "I Will Not Bow" and "Lights Out". Rauch is also a writer for Razor & Tie Music Publishing.

Rauch has also worked with acts such as Pillar, Kerrie Roberts, Stars Go Dim, Fireflight, 12 Stones, Spoken, The Wedding, and Disciple. Spoken frontman Matt Baird expressed Rauch as a "vital part in what 'Illusion' is and where Spoken is right now", crediting him as "an amazing producer." Rauch also worked with producer Rob Graves in scoring the film Into the Darkness.

== Personal life ==
Rauch has two daughters with his first wife. He resides in Springfield, Tennessee. Rauch is a Christian. His second wife delivered their first child stillborn in December 2016. In January 2018, the couple's daughter was born.

== Discography ==
With Breaking Benjamin

- Dear Agony (songwriting only) (2009)
- Dark Before Dawn (2015)
- Ember (2018)
- Aurora (2020)

With Love & Death

- Chemicals (EP) (songwriter & producer) (2012)
- Between Here & Lost (songwriter & producer) (2013)
- Perfectly Preserved (2021)

With Red

- End of Silence (2006)
- Innocence & Instinct (2009)
- Until We Have Faces (songwriting only) (2011)
- Release the Panic (songwriting only) (2013)

Production Discography

- Until We Have Faces – Red (2011)
- Beyond the Machine – Downplay (2011)
- No Direction – The Wedding (2012)
- Now – Fireflight (2012)
- O God Save Us All – Disciple (2012)
- The Paradigm Shift – Korn (2013)
- Between Here & Lost – Love and Death (2013)
- Illusion – Spoken (2013)
- Nothing More – Nothing More (2014)
- From Water to War – Nine Lashes (2014)
- Dark Before Dawn – Breaking Benjamin (2015)
- Come In – Children 18:3 (2015)
- Ember – Breaking Benjamin (2018)
- Aurora – Breaking Benjamin (2020)
- Amends – Grey Daze (2020)
- Perfectly Preserved – Love and Death (2021)
- Awaken – Breaking Benjamin (2024)
