= Dan Johnson (musician) =

American drummer

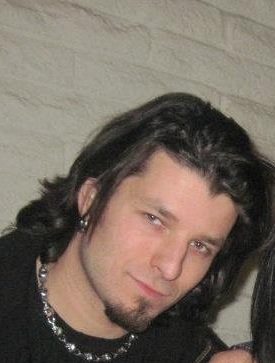

Background information
- Genres: Christian rock, alternative metal, hard rock, nu metal
- Occupation: Drummer
- Years active: 1998–present
- Member of: Red; Soundmankillz
- Formerly of: Love and Death; The Sammus Theory; Back from Ashes; Mo Nasty; UO4; Flaw

Dan Johnson is an American drummer currently with American rock bands Red and Soundmankillz and formerly with Christian metal band Love and Death, rock metal band Back from Ashes, and hard rock band The Sammus Theory.

== History ==
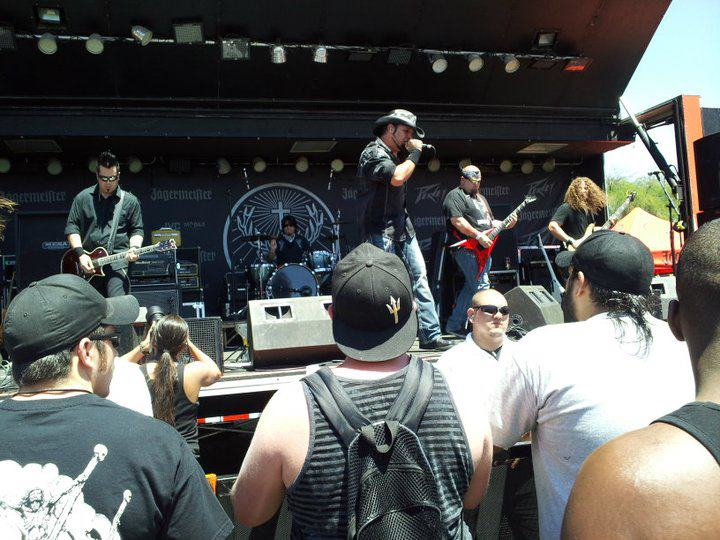
Dan Johnson performing with Nate Gullickson of Throw Logic and Phoenix rock metal band Back From Ashes at Mayhem Festival 2011 in Arizona

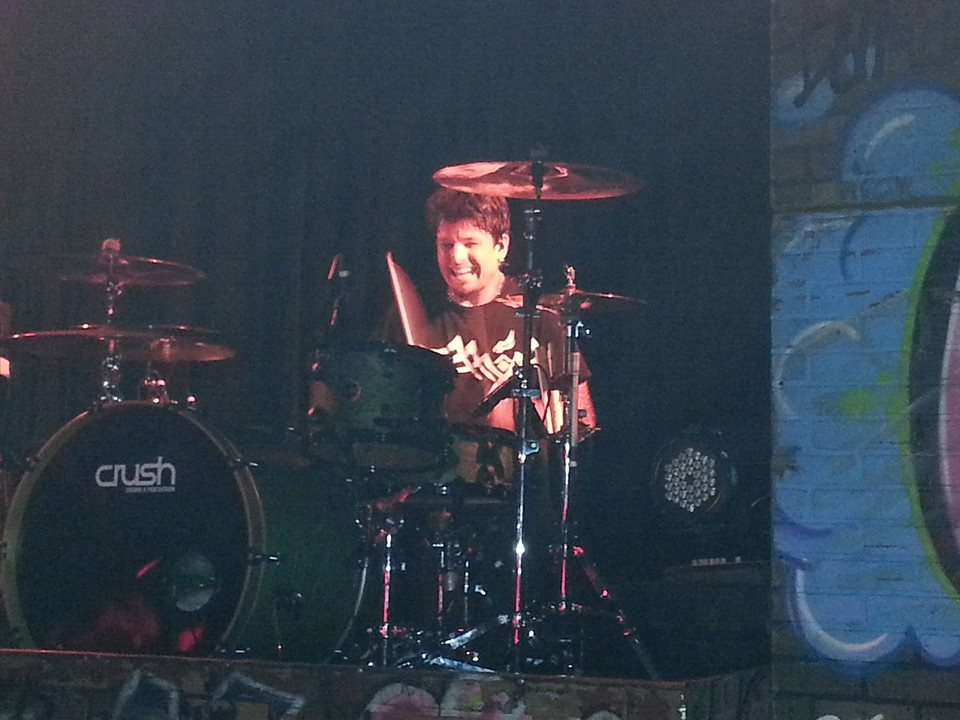
Dan Johnson performing with American Christian rock band Red

Having grown up in Pennsylvania, Johnson played drums in the band UO4 throughout his high school career. After starting his adulthood in Phoenix, his drumming career in Arizona began with local band Mo Nasty, after which time he moved on to The Sammus Theory.

In 2009, Brian "Head" Welch, the guitarist for Korn asked Johnson along with Michael Valentine (bass), Scott Von Heldt (guitar), Ralph Patlan (guitar), and Brian Ruedy (keyboards, programming) to join his up-and-coming musical ensemble.

In 2011, following Pete Hawley's departure from Back from Ashes, the band recruited Johnson to play for the ensemble. In February 2012, Back from Ashes hired Bobby Anderson to play percussion on a long-term basis for the band.

In 2012, it was revealed that Johnson had formed the band Love and Death with Welch and Valentine. Some time prior to December 2020, Johnson parted ways with the ensemble.

In 2014, Joe Rickard, the drummer for the Christian rock band Red, left the group, to join Manafest as a touring drummer so Johnson filled in for him on tours and performed percussion on Of Beauty and Rage, the fifth studio album from the ensemble. In January 2019, Johnson became a settled member of Red. Sometime before February 2021, he and the ensemble parted ways.

In late 2015, Johnson performed in multiple shows with rock band Seasons After. In 2016 and 2017, Johnson performed in multiple shows with American nu-metal band Flaw. In March 2021, American rock band Soundmankillz welcomed the percussionist into their ensemble. On March 1, 2026, Red announced Johnson's return as Drummer.
