= As I Lay Dying discography =

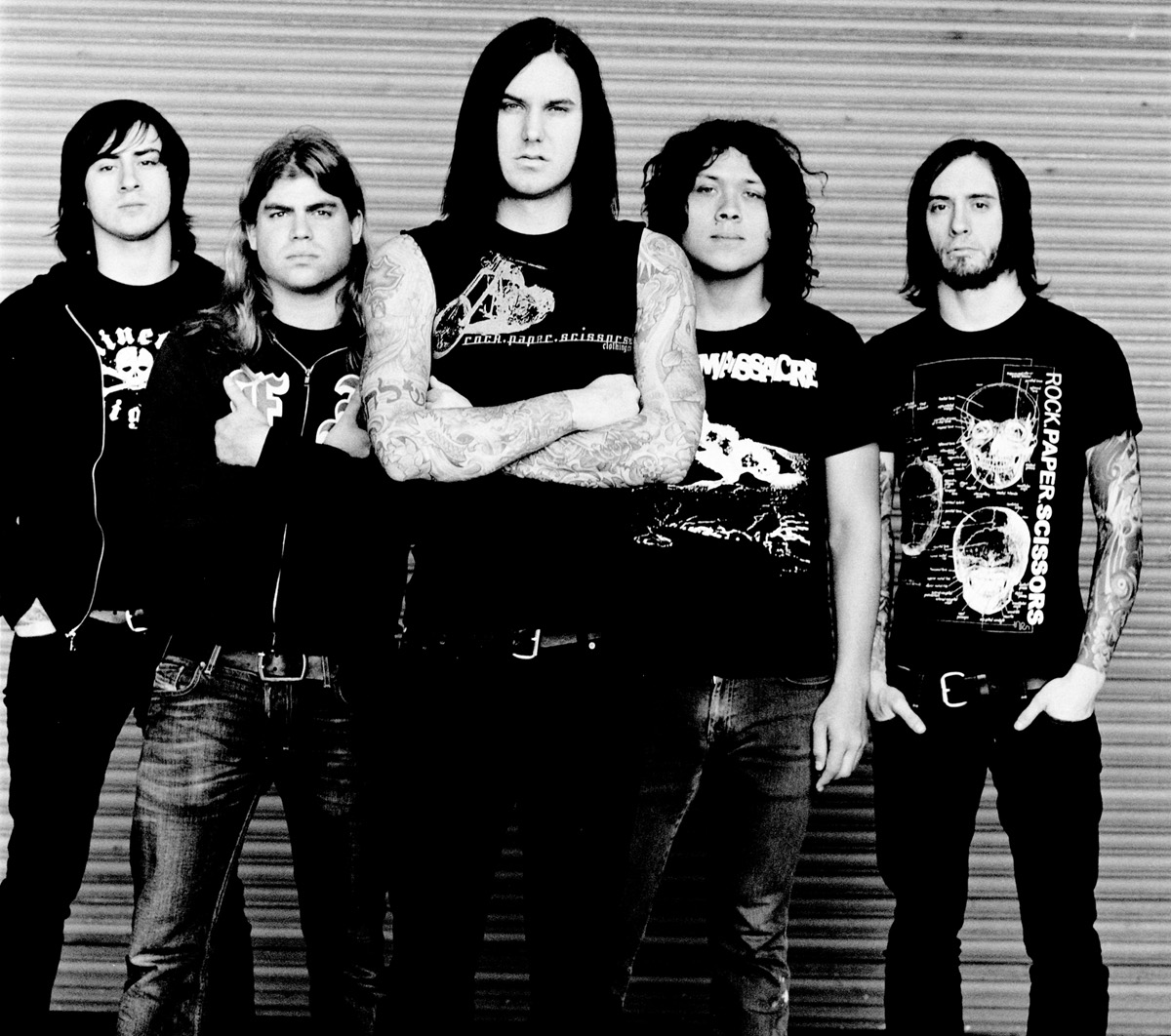
- Studio albums: 8
- Compilation albums: 2
- Singles: 18
- Video albums: 1
- Music videos: 27
- Split albums: 1

The discography of American metalcore band As I Lay Dying consists of 8 studio albums, 2 compilation albums, 1 video album, 18 singles and 27 corresponding music videos as well as 1 split album with fellow metalcore band American Tragedy called As I Lay Dying/American Tragedy.

== Studio albums ==
List of studio albums, with selected chart positions
Title	Album details	Peak chart positions								
Title	Album details	US	US Heat.	US Indie.	US Rock	US Hard Rock	CAN	GER	AUT	SWI
Beneath the Encasing of Ashes	Released: June 12, 2001; Label: Pluto; Formats: CD, digital download	—	—	—	—	—	—	—	—	—
Frail Words Collapse	Released: July 1, 2003; Label: Metal Blade; Formats: CD, digital download	—	41	30	—	—	—	—	—	—
Shadows Are Security	Released: June 14, 2005; Label: Metal Blade; Formats: CD, digital download	35	—	1	—	—	—	—	—	—
An Ocean Between Us	Released: August 21, 2007; Label: Metal Blade; Formats: CD, digital download	8	—	2	1	1	—	24	33	43
The Powerless Rise	Released: May 11, 2010; Label: Metal Blade; Formats: CD, digital download	10	—	2	5	3	11	22	21	39
Awakened	Released: September 25, 2012; Label: Metal Blade; Formats: CD, digital download	11	—	3	6	1	12	21	26	52
Shaped by Fire	Released: September 20, 2019; Label: Nuclear Blast; Formats: CD, digital download	50	—	5	7	3	28	6	9	15
Through Storms Ahead	Released: November 15, 2024; Label: Napalm; Formats: CD, digital download	—	—	—	—	—	—	26	14	76
As I Lay Dying	Scheduled: February 5, 2027; Label: Napalm; Formats: CD, digital download	—	—	—	—	—	—	—	—	—
"—" denotes a recording that did not chart or was not released in that territory.

== Compilation albums ==
List of compilation albums, with selected chart positions
Title	Album details	Peak chart positions				
Title	Album details	US	US Indie.	US Rock	US Hard Rock	GER
A Long March: The First Recordings	Released: May 16, 2006; Label: Metal Blade; Formats: CD, digital download	129	5	—	—	—
Decas	Released: November 4, 2011; Label: Metal Blade; Formats: CD, digital download	61	12	16	6	80
"—" denotes a recording that did not chart or was not released in that territory.

== Singles ==
Year	Single	Album
2005	"Meaning in Tragedy"	Shadows Are Security
2006	"The Darkest Nights"	Shadows Are Security
2007	"Within Destruction"	An Ocean Between Us
2009	"I Never Wanted"	An Ocean Between Us
2012	"Cauterize"	Awakened
2018	"My Own Grave"	Shaped by Fire
2019	"Redefined"	Shaped by Fire
2019	"Shaped by Fire"	Shaped by Fire
2019	"Blinded"	Shaped by Fire
2020	"Destruction or Strength"	Shaped by Fire
2021	"Roots Below"	Shaped by Fire
2024	"Burden"	Through Storms Ahead
2024	"The Cave We Fear to Enter"	Through Storms Ahead
2024	"We Are the Dead" (featuring Alex Terrible and Tom Barber)	Through Storms Ahead
2024	"Whitewashed Tomb"	Through Storms Ahead
2024	"The Void Within"	Through Storms Ahead
2025	"Echoes"	"As I Lay Dying"
2025	"If I Fall"	"As I Lay Dying"

== Video albums ==
Title	Details	US Top Music Videos	Certifications
This Is Who We Are	Released: April 14, 2009; Label: Metal Blade; Formats: DVD	20	RIAA: Gold; MC: Platinum

== Split albums ==
Title	Album details
As I Lay Dying/American Tragedy with American Tragedy	Released: June 18, 2002; Label: Pluto; Formats: CD

== Music videos ==
List of music videos, showing year released, director and album
Title	Year	Director	Album
"94 Hours"	2003	Derek Dale	Frail Words Collapse
"Forever"	2004	Derek Dale	Frail Words Collapse
"Confined"	2005	Christopher Sims	Shadows Are Security
"Through Struggle"	2005	Lex Halaby	Shadows Are Security
"The Darkest Nights"	2006	Darren Doane	Shadows Are Security
"Nothing Left"	2007	Brian Thompson	An Ocean Between Us
"The Sound of Truth"	2008	Brian Thompson	An Ocean Between Us
"Within Destruction"	2008	Jerry Clubb	An Ocean Between Us
"I Never Wanted"	2009	Denise Korycki	An Ocean Between Us
"Parallels"	2010	Dave Brodsky	The Powerless Rise
"Anodyne Sea"	2011	McFarland and Mike Pecci	The Powerless Rise
"Beyond Our Suffering"	2011	Joe Hamming	The Powerless Rise
"Electric Eye"	2011	Paul Brown	Decas
"Paralyzed"	2012	Nick Hipa	Decas
"A Greater Foundation"	2012	Drew Russ	Awakened
"My Own Grave"	2018	Josh Knoff	Shaped by Fire
"Redefined"	2019	Orie McGinness	Shaped by Fire
"Shaped by Fire"	2019	Mathis Arnell	Shaped by Fire
"Blinded"	2019	Frankie Nasso	Shaped by Fire
"Torn Between"	2020	Mathis Arnell	Shaped by Fire
"Burden"	2024	Tom Flynn and Mike Watts	Through Storms Ahead
"The Cave We Fear to Enter"	2024	Tom Flynn and Mike Watts	Through Storms Ahead
"We Are the Dead"	2024	Tom Flynn	Through Storms Ahead
"Whitewashed Tomb"	2024	Tom Flynn and Mike Watts	Through Storms Ahead
"Echoes"	2025	Tom Flynn	As I Lay Dying
"If I Fall"	2025	Tom Flynn	As I Lay Dying
"Polarized"	2026	Tom Flynn	As I Lay Dying
