= As I Lay Dying (album) =

2027 studio album by As I Lay Dying

Studio album by As I Lay Dying
- Released: February 5, 2027
- Genre: Metalcore
- Length: 40:11
- Label: Napalm

As I Lay Dying chronology
Through Storms Ahead (2024)	As I Lay Dying (2027)

As I Lay Dying is the upcoming ninth studio album by American metalcore band As I Lay Dying. The album is set to be released on February 5, 2027, through Napalm Records. It is the band's first album to feature bassist and clean vocalist Chris Clancy, guitarists Bill Hudson and Don Vedda, and drummer Tim Yeung.

== Background ==
In November 2024, As I Lay Dying released the eighth studio album Through Storms Ahead. Prior to the release the album, guitarists Phil Sgrosso, Ken Susi, bassist and clean vocalist Ryan Neff, and drummer Nick Pierce left the band in October 2024.

On May 20, 2025, Tim Lambesis announced a European 20th anniversary tour of Shadows Are Security to begin in the fall in Russia, although touring members had not been announced.

On October 8, 2025, the band released the single "Echoes", coupled with the announcement of a new lineup with bassist/clean vocalist Chris Clancy (of Mutiny Within), guitarists Bill Hudson and Don Vedda, and drummer Tim Yeung. On November 19, 2025, the band released their second single, “If I Fall”. In late October to mid November of 2025 & March 2026 this new lineup went on tour in Russia in celebration of Shadows Are Security 20th anniversary. In December 2025 the band played in Mexico & South America in late April to early May of 2026.

Two more singles, "Polarized" and "Retribution", were released on September 15, 2026, followed shortly by the announcement that the band's self-titled ninth studio album set to be released on February 5, 2027.

On September 16, 2026, the band announced an album release tour to celebrate their new album taking place in North America from early February to early March of 2027 joined with Immortal Disfigurement.

On November 3, 2026, the band released their fifth single, “The Cost To Stay”. On November 18, 2026, the band announced a European leg of their album release tour taking place in late April to mid May of 2027.

== Track listing ==
As I Lay Dying track listing
No.	Title	Length
1.	"Satelites"	3:19
2.	"Echoes"	4:29
3.	"Relentless"	3:41
4.	"The Cost to Stay"	3:41
5.	"Polarized"	3:42
6.	"Retribution"	4:08
7.	"A Heart Meant to Break"	3:55
8.	"No Way Out"	3:42
9.	"If I Fall"	4:16
10.	"After the Storm"	5:18
Total length:		40:11

== Personnel ==
As I Lay Dying

- Tim Lambesis – unclean vocals
- Bill Hudson – guitars
- Don Vedda – guitars
- Chris Clancy – bass, clean vocals
- Tim Yeung – drums
