= Poison Headache =

American thrash metal band

- Origin: San Diego, California, U.S.
- Genres: Thrash metal, metallic hardcore, grindcore, hardcore punk
- Years active: 2010–present
- Labels: Metal Blade
- Members: Phil Sgrosso; Andy Kukta; Kyle Rosa
- Website: Poison Headache on Facebook

Poison Headache is an American thrash metal band that formed in 2010. The band consists of guitarist, bassist, and vocalist Phil Sgrosso, vocalist and guitarist Andy Kukta and drummer Kyle Rosa.

== History ==
The band began in 2010 as a project of Phil Sgrosso, Kyle Rosa and Andy Kukta. The project formed after the demise of Kukta's band, Intermal Affairs. Sgrosso and Rosa knew each other from As I Lay Dying. Sgrosso performed guitar in the band, while Rosa toured with the band as a drum tech. He was also in Thieves & Liars until it disbanded.

The band truly came to be in 2016, when the band signed to Metal Blade Records, while premiering the track "Sin Eater". It was later announced Sgrosso was a part of the project, while premiering a new track, "Conspirator". Soon after the band had announced its full lineup, the band released Poison Headache for streaming. The album was released on June 3, 2016, to great reviews. The album was mixed by Taylor Young (Nails) and mastered by Brad Boatright (Sleep). Soon after the release of the album, the band released their debut music video titled "Rot With Me".

== Members ==
- Andy Kukta – vocals, guitars (2010–present) (formerly in Internal Affairs)
- Phil Sgrosso – vocals, guitars, bass guitar (2010–present) (Saosin formerly As I Lay Dying and Wovenwar)
- Kyle Rosa – drums (2010–present) (formerly in Thieves & Liars, now Atreyu)

== Discography ==
Studio albums

- Poison Headache (June 3, 2016; Metal Blade)

Music video

- Rot With Me
