= My Own Grave =

Single by As I Lay Dying

from the album Shaped by Fire
- Released: June 8, 2018
- Recorded: 2018
- Genre: Metalcore
- Length: 4:13
- Songwriter: As I Lay Dying
- Producers: As I Lay Dying; Drew Fulk

As I Lay Dying singles chronology
"Cauterize" (2012)	"My Own Grave" (2018)	"Redefined" (2019)

"My Own Grave" is a song by American metalcore band As I Lay Dying. It is their first single in six years. It was the first song released following singer Tim Lambesis' incarceration in 2013 and the first to feature Phil Sgrosso playing alongside Nick Hipa, Jordan Mancino and Josh Gilbert since Sgrosso's departure from Wovenwar in 2016.

== Background ==
In 2013, Tim Lambesis was arrested for attempting to solicit a hitman to murder his wife. Upon the arrest, the rest of the band distanced themselves away from Lambesis both personally and professionally, going on to start the band Wovenwar with Oh, Sleeper vocalist Shane Blay. Wovenwar would go on to release two albums, Wovenwar and Honor Is Dead, before Sgrosso left in 2016 between tensions between himself and Nick Hipa stemming from coping with the public aftermath and fallout of Lambesis' arrest. In December 2016 Lambesis was released on probation after which he began reaching out to the members of the band to make amends and apologize in person. After several months of apprehension the band eventually all met up individually with Lambesis and all noted positive changes within his personality which led Sgrosso to reach out to Hipa and rekindle their friendship. In 2017 there were reports that Lambesis planned to restart As I Lay Dying with all new members which proved to be false. On June 7, 2018 the band released a music video with the song appearing on all streaming services the following day. The minimalist video featured the band playing on a white soundstage. On June 16, 2018, the band published a video on their YouTube channel detailing the terms of their reunion and suggesting that "My Own Grave" was the only new song the band wrote following reuniting.

== Reception ==
The release of the song garnered polarizing reactions. Criticism was primarily targeted at Lambesis's arrest, the subsequent release, and the moral implications of supporting him considering his crime. Metal news website MetalSucks published an article stating that they will not be covering any future As I Lay Dying news; a few other publications voiced their support of the idea. Singer Jamey Jasta of Hatebreed explained on his podcast that he is reluctant to support Lambesis given the nature of the crime.

The song itself, however, was very well received, with critics and fans praising both the song and the band's return. The music video reached 1 million views on YouTube within a few days of its release.

== Personnel ==
- Tim Lambesis – unclean vocals
- Phil Sgrosso – guitar
- Nick Hipa – guitar
- Josh Gilbert – bass, clean vocals
- Jordan Mancino – drums
