= Through Storms Ahead =

2024 studio album by As I Lay Dying

Studio album by As I Lay Dying
- Released: November 15, 2024
- Genre: Metalcore
- Length: 42:18
- Label: Napalm
- Producers: Phil Sgrosso; Hiram Hernandez

As I Lay Dying chronology
Shaped by Fire (2019)	Through Storms Ahead (2024)	As I Lay Dying (2027)

Singles from Through Storms Ahead
- 1. "Burden" Released: May 22, 2024; 2. "The Cave We Fear to Enter" Released: July 9, 2024; 3. "We Are the Dead" Released: September 12, 2024; 4. "Whitewashed Tomb" Released: October 10, 2024; 5. "The Void Within" Released: November 13, 2024

Through Storms Ahead is the eighth studio album by American metalcore band As I Lay Dying, released on November 15, 2024, through Napalm Records. It is the band's only album to feature bassist and clean vocalist Ryan Neff, guitarist Ken Susi, and drummer Nick Pierce as well as the last to feature longtime guitarist Phil Sgrosso, as they would all depart from the band a month before its release. It is also the band's first album not to feature Nick Hipa, Josh Gilbert and Jordan Mancino since their departure from the band in the early 2020s.

== Background and promotion ==
Frontman Tim Lambesis first teased the album back in 2022, aiming for a 2023 release before releasing the first two singles titled "Burden" and "The Cave We Fear to Enter" in mid-2024. The third single titled "We Are the Dead", which featured Tom Barber from Chelsea Grin and Darko US, and Alex Terrible from Slaughter to Prevail was released on September 12, 2024, along with the announcement of the album. The fourth single titled "Whitewashed Tomb" was released on October 10, 2024. Later that month, members Ryan Neff, Ken Susi and Nick Pierce announced their departures, the latter two citing compromise of personal integrity and morals; Phil Sgrosso followed suit at the end of the month, citing unhealthy environment within the band. A fifth single titled "The Void Within" was released on November 13, 2024.

== Critical reception ==
Professional ratings
Review scores
Source	Rating
Blabbermouth.net	7/10
Lambgoat	8/10
SonicAbuse	5/10 stars
Metal Temple Magazine	5/5 stars

The album received generally positive reviews from critics. Dom Lawson from Blabbermouth.net wrote of the album, "Nobody is going to win prizes for originality, but Through Storms Ahead is a more than worthwhile addition to the canon. In fact, if everything had gone to plan, this would almost certainly be garnering lots of positive write-ups and nudging As I Lay Dying back towards their once enviable position as metalcore figureheads. Unfortunately, we are where we are. Can something be salvaged from the mess? We will have to wait and see. But as missed opportunities go, Through Storms Ahead is one for the history books."

Steve Lampiris of Lambgoat stated of the album, "Without a weak track, Through Storms Ahead is another strong entry in As I Lay Dying’s catalog. It’s doubtful longtime fans would expect words like 'pretty', 'tuneful', and 'trendy' to accurately describe the band’s music, but here we are. Through Storms Ahead, then, is the AILD’s slickest and most melodic album to date, making it their most easily digestible. Your mileage, therefore, depends on how you feel about that. Here’s a time-saving tip: give one listen to 'The Cave [We Fear to Enter]', and if that’s your thing then this album’s for you."

SonicAbuse gave a mixed review, stating that "The band’s absolute insistence on metalcore by the numbers makes this 40-odd minute album feel almost twice as long, and you get to the point that in every song you are just praying that it won’t take the easy road yet again. It’s a shame, because the musicians involved a clearly exceptionally talented and the production is strong (if a little Pro-Tooled for these tastes). Alas, it’s not enough to save it and, whatever the future may hold for AILD, we have to hope that the band will shake themselves free from a formula that is bordering on parody at this point."

Metal Temple praised the album, stating "The musical horizons of the band seem to have expanded, with moments being able to stomp the bones of the fans flat due the massive and modern aggressive outfit (as on the cyclone of brutality heard on 'We Are the Dead'), but it’s obvious that they’re still respecting the main musical core of their identity. It’s a massive blow of energy filled with many melodic hooks, excellent screams and grunts contrasting with sung tunes, and a fine and technical work on the instrumental parts, with melodies and aggressiveness being offered in the right doses, and what lovely choruses filled with hooks in the middle of strong breakdowns—Through Storms Ahead is a statement that, even after many trials, As I Lay Dying is still here, still relevant, and still excellent."

== Track listing ==
All lyrics are written by Tim Lambesis; "The Cave We Fear to Enter" lyrics co-written by Ryan Neff and Hiram Hernandez.

Through Storms Ahead track listing
No.	Title	Music	Length
1.	"Permanence"	Phil Sgrosso	1:12
2.	"A Broken Reflection"	Tim Lambesis; Sgrosso	3:55
3.	"Burden"	Lambesis; Sgrosso; Hiram Hernandez	4:05
4.	"We Are the Dead"	Lambesis; Sgrosso; Hernandez	3:43
5.	"Whitewashed Tomb"	Lambesis; Sgrosso	3:58
6.	"Through Storms Ahead"	Lambesis; Sgrosso	4:07
7.	"The Void Within"	Lambesis; Sgrosso; Hernandez	3:25
8.	"Strength to Survive"	Lambesis; Sgrosso	4:36
9.	"Gears That Never Stop"	Lambesis; Sgrosso	3:48
10.	"The Cave We Fear to Enter"	Lambesis; Sgrosso; Ryan Neff; Hernandez	5:07
11.	"Taken from Nothing"	Lambesis; Sgrosso	4:22
Total length:			42:18

== Personnel ==
As I Lay Dying

- Tim Lambesis – unclean vocals
- Phil Sgrosso – guitars
- Ken Susi – guitars
- Ryan Neff – bass, clean vocals
- Nick Pierce – drums

Additional musicians

- Tom Barber – guest vocals on "We Are the Dead"
- Alex Terrible – guest vocals on "We Are the Dead"

Additional personnel

- Hiram Hernandez – production, engineering
- Phil Sgrosso – production, engineering
- Tim Lambesis – engineering
- Aaron Chaparian – mixing
- Mike Kalajian – mastering
- GiGi Zimmer – engineering
- Joseph McQueen – engineering
- Corey Meyers – artwork

== Charts ==
Chart performance for Through Storms Ahead
Chart (2024)	Peak position
Austrian Albums (Ö3 Austria)	14
German Albums (Offizielle Top 100)	26
Swiss Albums (Schweizer Hitparade)	76
UK Album Downloads (Official Charts)	50
UK Rock & Metal Albums (Official Charts)	33
