= Decas =

Compilation album by As I Lay Dying
- Released: November 4, 2011
- Length: 38:20
- Label: Metal Blade
- Producer: Adam Dutkiewicz; Tim Lambesis; Innerpartysystem; Ben Weinman; Kelly "Carnage" Cairns; Big Chocolate; Iron Krill

As I Lay Dying chronology
The Powerless Rise (2010)	Decas (2011)	Awakened (2012)

Professional ratings
Aggregate scores
Source	Rating
Metacritic	59%
Review scores
Source	Rating
About.com	3.5/5 stars
AllMusic	3.5/5 stars
Alternative Press	3/5 stars
Big Cheese	3/5
Blabbermouth.net	7/10
The Christian Post	Favorable
Exclaim!	Slightly unfavorable
Kerrang!	3/5 stars
PopMatters	4/10 stars
Revolver	3/5

Decas is the second compilation album by American metalcore band As I Lay Dying. It features three newly recorded songs, four cover songs, four remixes and one re-recording. The album was released through Metal Blade Records on November 4, 2011, in Germany, Austria, and Switzerland; on November 7 in the UK and the rest of Europe; and on November 8 in the US.

The release of Decas is meant to commemorate As I Lay Dying's tenth anniversary of being a band, and was also described by the group as a gift to their fans for their support over the years. Coinciding with the release of Decas, As I Lay Dying embarked on the "A Decade of Destruction" tour running from November through December 2011 with openers Of Mice & Men, The Ghost Inside, Iwrestledabearonce and Sylosis.

"Paralyzed" was first released as a YouTube lyric video on September 13, 2011. Also, on November 7, the day before the album's US release, "Paralyzed" was released on iTunes as a free download. The track was originally intended to be the iTunes pre-order bonus for As I Lay Dying's previous album, The Powerless Rise. "War Ensemble" was previously released in a Limited Edition Free Download of the Video Game, Homefront soundtrack. "Electric Eye" was first available to stream via Noisecreep on October 3, 2011.

== Track listing ==
All lyrics are written by Tim Lambesis, except where noted; all music is composed by As I Lay Dying, except where noted

No.	Title	Lyrics	Music	Length
1.	"Paralyzed"			3:04
2.	"From Shapeless to Breakable"			2:44
3.	"Moving Forward"			3:42
4.	"War Ensemble" (originally by Slayer)	Tom Araya, Jeff Hanneman	Hanneman	4:50
5.	"Hellion" (originally by Judas Priest)	(instrumental)	K. K. Downing, Glenn Tipton	0:44
6.	"Electric Eye" (originally by Judas Priest)	Rob Halford	Downing, Tipton	3:45
7.	"Coffee Mug" (originally by Descendents)	Bill Stevenson	Stephen Egerton, Stevenson	0:40
8.	"Beneath the Encasing" (re-recorded medley)			3:57
9.	"The Blinding of False Light" (Innerpartysystem remix)			4:18
10.	"Wrath Upon Ourselves" (Ben Weinman remix)			2:25
11.	"Confined" (Kelly "Carnage" Cairns remix)			3:51
12.	"Elegy" (Big Chocolate remix)			4:20
Total length:				38:20

iTunes Store bonus track
No.	Title	Length
13.	"Upside Down Kingdom" (Iron Krill remix)	3:02

== Personnel ==
As I Lay Dying

- Tim Lambesis – lead vocals
- Nick Hipa – lead guitar, backing vocals
- Phil Sgrosso – rhythm guitar, backing vocals
- Josh Gilbert – bass, clean vocals
- Jordan Mancino – drums
