= As I Lay Dying (band) =

American metalcore band

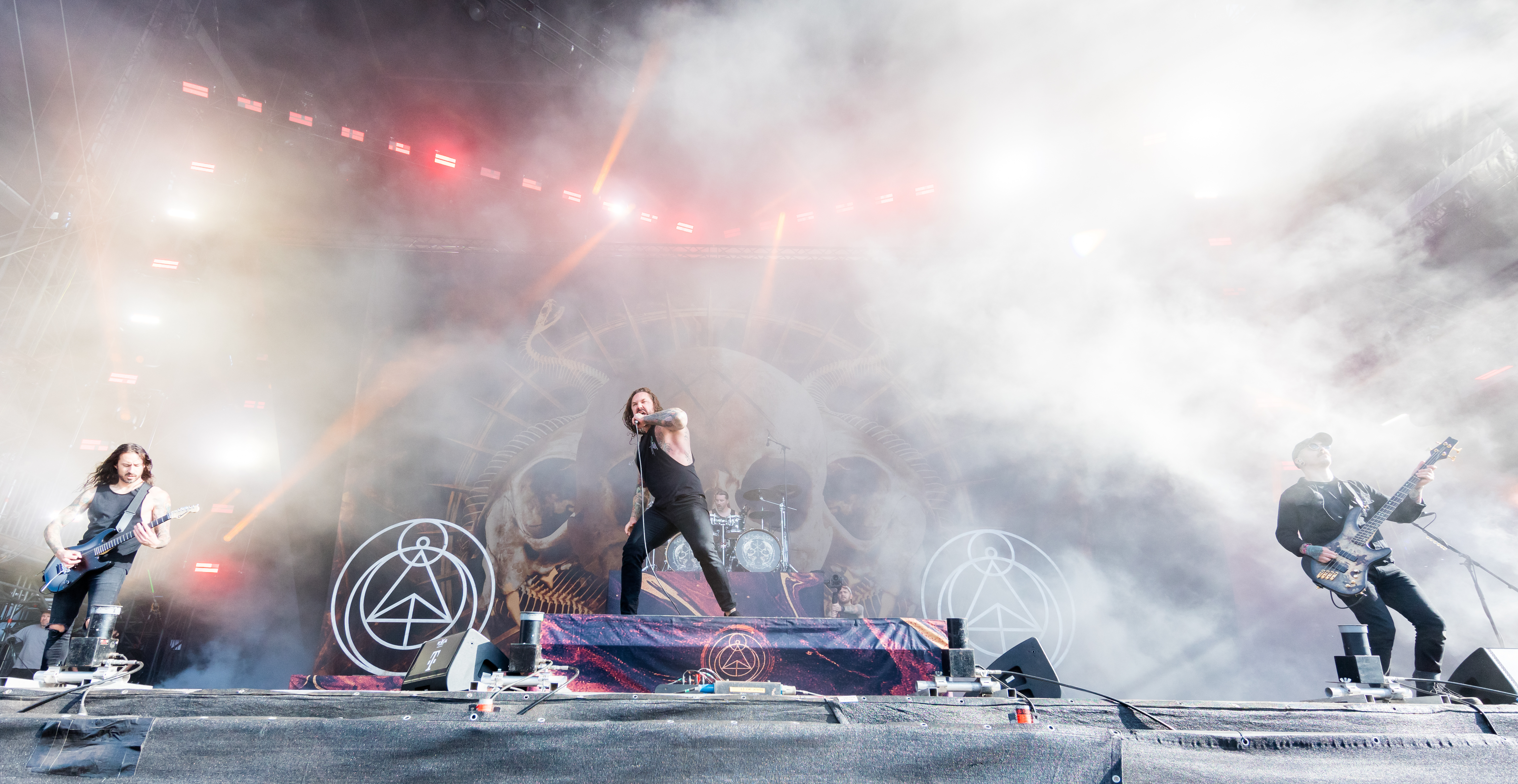
- As I Lay Dying at Wacken Open Air 2022

Background information
- Also known as: Life Once Lost; AILD
- Origin: San Diego, California, U.S.
- Genres: Melodic metalcore; thrash metal; Christian metal (early)
- Works: Discography
- Years active: 2000–2014; 2017–present
- Labels: Pluto; Metal Blade; Nuclear Blast; Napalm
- Spinoffs: Wovenwar
- Members: Tim Lambesis; Chris Clancy; Bill Hudson; Don Vedda; Tim Yeung
- Past members: Jeremy Rojas; Noah Chase; Tommy Garcia; Brandon Hays; Jasun Krebs; Aaron Kennedy; Evan White; Phil Sgrosso; Clint Norris; Nick Hipa; Josh Gilbert; Jordan Mancino; Ryan Neff; Ken Susi; Nick Pierce
- Website: asilaydying.com

As I Lay Dying is an American metalcore band from San Diego, California. Formed in 2000 by vocalist Tim Lambesis, the band's first full lineup (including Lambesis' Point of Recognition bandmate Jordan Mancino) was completed in 2001. The band has released eight albums, one split album, and two compilation albums.

As I Lay Dying's fourth studio album, An Ocean Between Us, peaked at No. 8 on the Billboard 200 and No. 1 on the Top Rock chart. The band has performed at festivals such as Wacken Open Air, With Full Force, Soundwave Festival, Warped Tour, Bloodstock Open Air and Taste of Chaos. In 2007, As I Lay Dying won the "Ultimate Metal God" award from MTV2 at the first annual "All That Rocks" special; was named "Artist of the Year" at the San Diego Music Awards in 2005, 2007 and 2008; and was nominated for a 2008 Grammy Award for the song "Nothing Left". Their fifth studio album, The Powerless Rise, was written over a three-year period, and was released in May 2010 to critical acclaim. Their last studio album before their hiatus, Awakened, was released on September 25, 2012.

The band went on an indefinite hiatus in 2014 when Lambesis was convicted and sentenced to six years in prison for soliciting the murder of his estranged wife. The remaining members formed Wovenwar with vocalist Shane Blay.

In 2018, Lambesis reunited with Hipa, Sgrosso, Mancino and Gilbert. On June 8, 2018, the band released the song "My Own Grave", their first recording in six years. They released their seventh studio album, Shaped by Fire, on September 20, 2019. The band's lineup dissolved in the years following the album's release. Hipa departed the band in 2020, followed by Gilbert and Mancino in 2022, just over a month between each other. They were replaced with Ken Susi, Ryan Neff, and Nick Pierce, respectively in 2022; all three would leave the band in 2024, with Sgrosso's departure from the band following shortly, leaving Lambesis as the sole band member. The band released their eighth studio album, Through Storms Ahead, on November 15, 2024.

== History ==
=== Formation, Beneath the Encasing of Ashes and Frail Words Collapse (2000–2004) ===
After leaving the band Society's Finest, where he played guitar, vocalist Tim Lambesis formed As I Lay Dying in 2000. Starting out as a duo with drummer Jordan Mancino, they first met as a band in February 2001. They both were in the hardcore punk band Point of Recognition. The band's name came from the novel of the same name by William Faulkner that was published in 1930. The band's lyrics and music are not directly inspired by the novel.

Shortly after the band's formation, Pluto Records offered As I Lay Dying a recording contract. The band accepted and entered the studio one month later to record their first album, Beneath the Encasing of Ashes, released in June 2001. The band then recorded five songs for a split album, again through Pluto Records, with San Diego post-hardcore band American Tragedy.

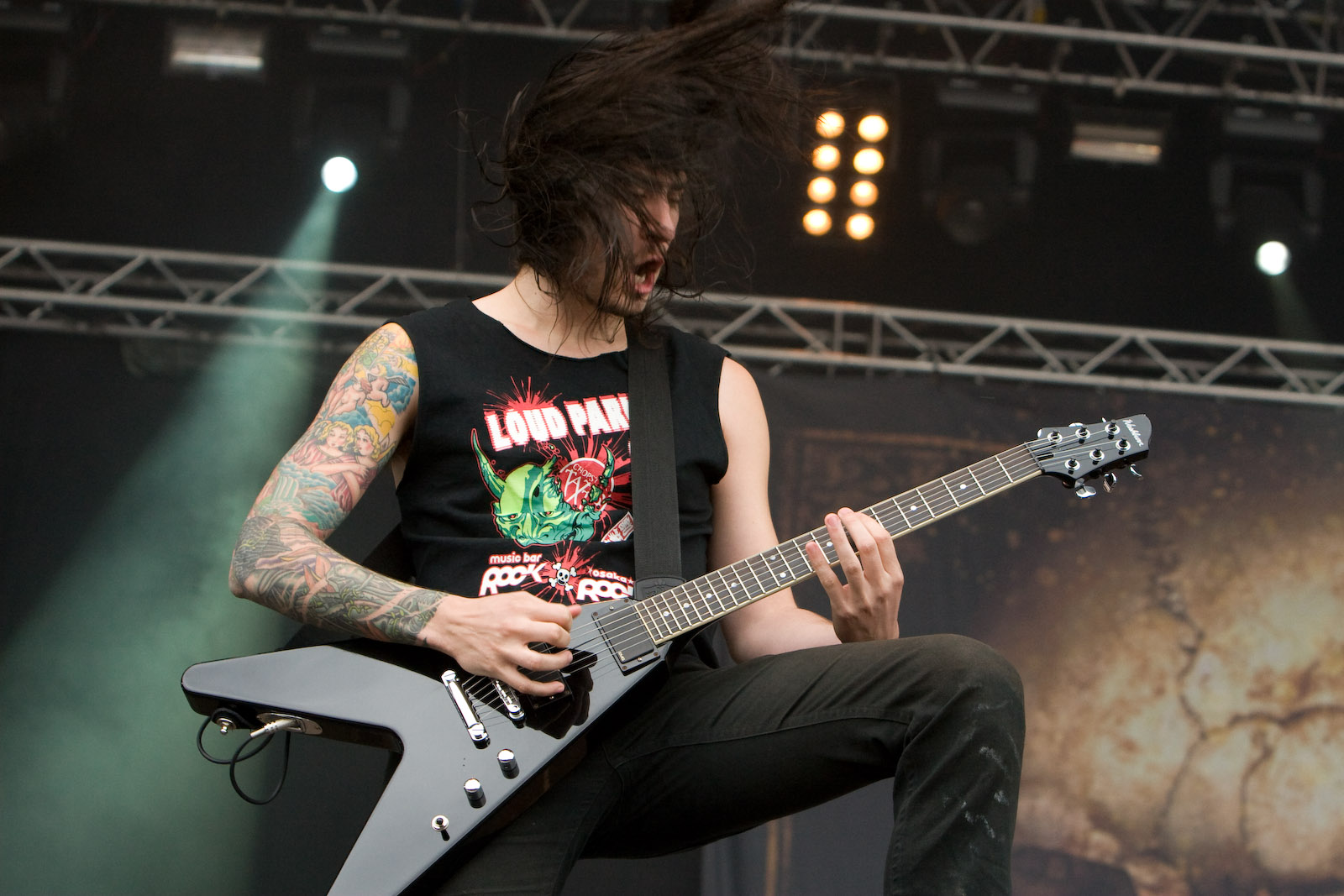
Phil Sgrosso became the band's rhythm guitarist in late 2003.

As I Lay Dying wanted to expand to a five-piece with another guitarist and a bassist. Mancino commented, "we started going on tour and we needed obviously more people than that." As Lambesis and Mancino were the only permanent members, the band recruited friends to perform with them and underwent several lineup changes. Bassist Noah Chase departed in 2001, while Brandon Hays, and his replacement, Aaron Kennedy, departed in 2003. During early 2003, when As I Lay Dying's Pluto Records contract expired, the band pursued deals with other labels. After extensive touring and increasing popularity, Metal Blade Records offered As I Lay Dying a deal in March 2003.

In July 2003, the band's second studio album, Frail Words Collapse, was released. Produced by Lambesis, the album peaked at No. 30 on Billboard's Independent Albums chart and No. 41 on the Top Heatseekers chart. William York of Allmusic thought the band "doesn't really add anything new to the mix from a musical standpoint" with the release, while also praising it for being "solid enough and well executed" with "adequate" production. Sherwin Frias of Jesus Freak Hideout felt similarly and commented, "As I Lay Dying didn't exactly break many boundaries in making this record", but praised that each song is "executed so well (and with such precision) that nary a song misses its target." Touring then occurred to promote the album, with support from bands Himsa, Shadows Fall, The Black Dahlia Murder, Killswitch Engage, In Flames, Sworn Enemy, and Hatebreed. Music videos for the songs "94 Hours" and "Forever" received rotation on Fuse and MTV2's Headbangers Ball.

=== Shadows Are Security and An Ocean Between Us (2005–2009) ===
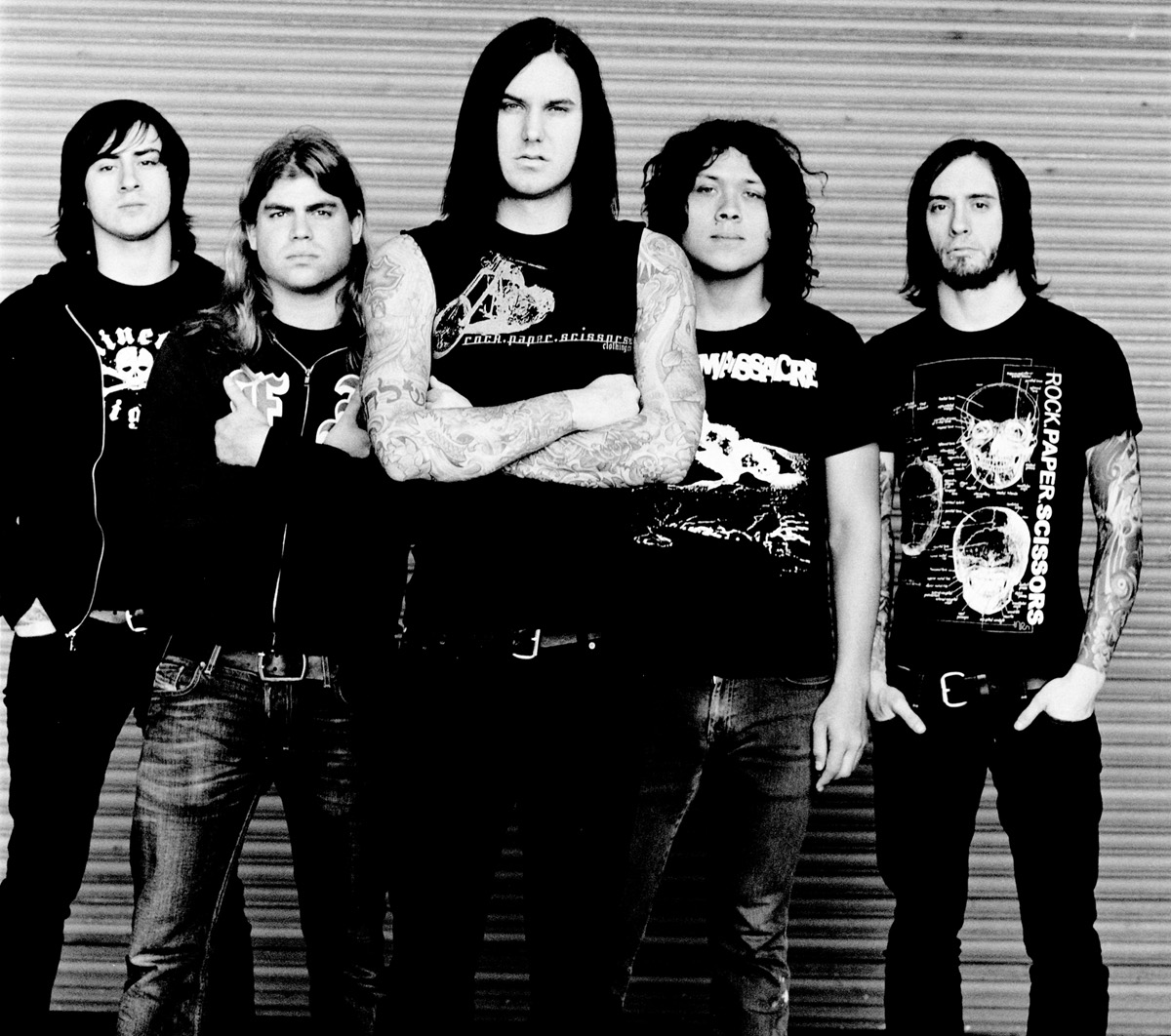
As I Lay Dying in 2006. From left to right: Phil Sgrosso, Jordan Mancino, Tim Lambesis, Nick Hipa, and Clint Norris.

As I Lay Dying entered Big Fish recording studio in Encinitas, California, US in January 2005 to record their third studio album. Shadows Are Security was released in June of the same year and debuted at No. 1 on the Independent Albums chart. It was the band's first release to enter the Billboard 200—at No. 35—and sold about 275,000 copies. Wade Kergan of AllMusic called it "one of the strongest releases of 2005," and commented that new guitarists Phil Sgrosso and Nick Hipa make the band "stronger." Rod Smith of Decibel Magazine commented, "Tim Lambesis's finely honed roar in bittersweet instrumental matrices augmented by occasional sung vocals by bass guitarist Clint Norris. Guitarists Phil Sgrosso and Nick Hipa whip up a melodic cyclone on 'The Darkest Nights'." By this time, guitarist Evan White had quit the band for personal reasons after his mother died. Dave Arthur of Kings to You performed all singing, because it sounded more powerful in the studio than Clint Norris's singing.

As I Lay Dying began touring to promote the new record by making appearances at Hell on Earth, Winter Headline Tour, and Ozzfest, as well as a tour with Slipknot and Unearth. The band was on the second stage with Rob Zombie, Killswitch Engage, Mastodon, The Haunted, and It Dies Today. The band raised its profile in 2006 through its support slot on the Taste of Chaos tour in the US, alongside Deftones, Thrice, Dredg, Funeral for a Friend, and Story of the Year. In May 2006, Beneath the Encasing of Ashes and the songs from the split album were re-released through Metal Blade Records as A Long March: The First Recordings. The album contained the original and re-recorded versions of the songs from the split album. The band preferred to re-release the material, as they didn't want fans paying large sums of money to listen to early releases. The re-release peaked at No. 3 on the Independent Albums chart and No. 129 on the Billboard 200 chart. In mid-2006, As I Lay Dying headlined the Sounds of the Underground Festival.

Norris left the band on good terms in November 2006 to focus on his marriage. The band auditioned ten bassists, but none was successful. Lambesis received demo tapes from a band called This Endearing, of which bassist Josh Gilbert was a member. Lambesis chose to "sit on it" and waited for the band to record more material. This Endearing disbanded and Gilbert was recruited as As I Lay Dying's new bassist.

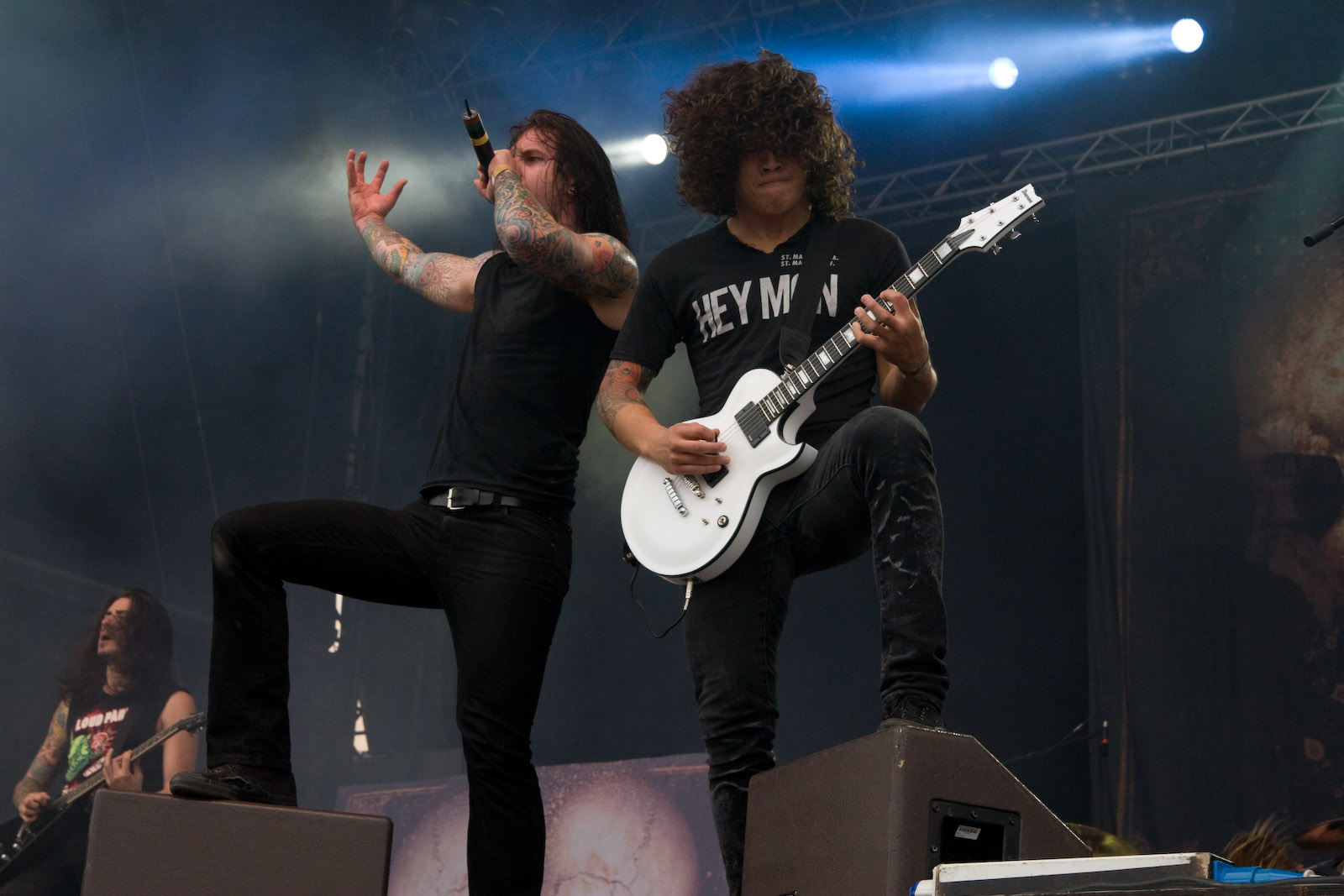
As I Lay Dying live at With Full Force 2007. From left to right: Sgrosso (background), Lambesis and Hipa.

In 2007, As I Lay Dying started recording a new album titled An Ocean Between Us, released on August 21, 2007. Debuting at No. 8 on the Billboard 200 and No. 1 on the Top Rock chart, with first-week sales of 39,000 units, the album was the band's highest-charting release.

Co-produced by Killswitch Engage guitarist Adam Dutkiewicz and As I Lay Dying, and mixed by Colin Richardson, the album received generally positive reviews. Christa L. Titus of Billboard commented: "Whatever the differences between As I Lay Dying's personal desires and what its fans demand, this album surely acts as a bridge," praising the song "Comfort Betrays" for its guitar solo. Scott Alisoglu of Blabbermouth.net described the album as "a well-rounded and often thrashy metalcore album, as the band has struck an effective balance between aggression and accessible melodies." Thom Jurek of Allmusic praised the band for expanding its musical range by including melodic singing and choruses, as they had previously done on "Confined" from Shadows Are Security. It was the first time that bass guitarist Gilbert recorded a studio album with the band.

To promote the album, As I Lay Dying performed at the Warped Tour 2007 in August, and toured through Europe in September with Darkest Hour, Himsa, and Maroon. The band was awarded the title "Ultimate Metal God" by MTV2's "All That Rocks" special, and was nominated for a Grammy Award in the category of "Best Metal Performance" for the song "Nothing Left". The other Grammy Award nominees included winner Slayer, King Diamond, Machine Head, and Shadows Fall. The band played a portion of the 2008 Warped Tour, as well as the Taste of Chaos UK 2008 Tour with headliners Atreyu. In 2008, they played the UK Bloodstock festival alongside Dimmu Borgir. On April 9, 2009, the DVD This Is Who We Are was released in Europe, and was released in the US on April 14, 2009. The DVD was certified Gold in the US almost a month after its release.

=== The Powerless Rise (2010–2011) ===
After recording through 2009, the band's fifth record The Powerless Rise was streamed on the MySpace Music website on May 7, 2010, up until May 10, 2010. The album was officially released on May 11, 2010, and received generally positive critical acclaim, with one critic saying: "Fans of metalcore in general, and As I Lay Dying in particular, will be more than satisfied with The Powerless Rise, as the band's gradual progression and consistency makes this their best album."

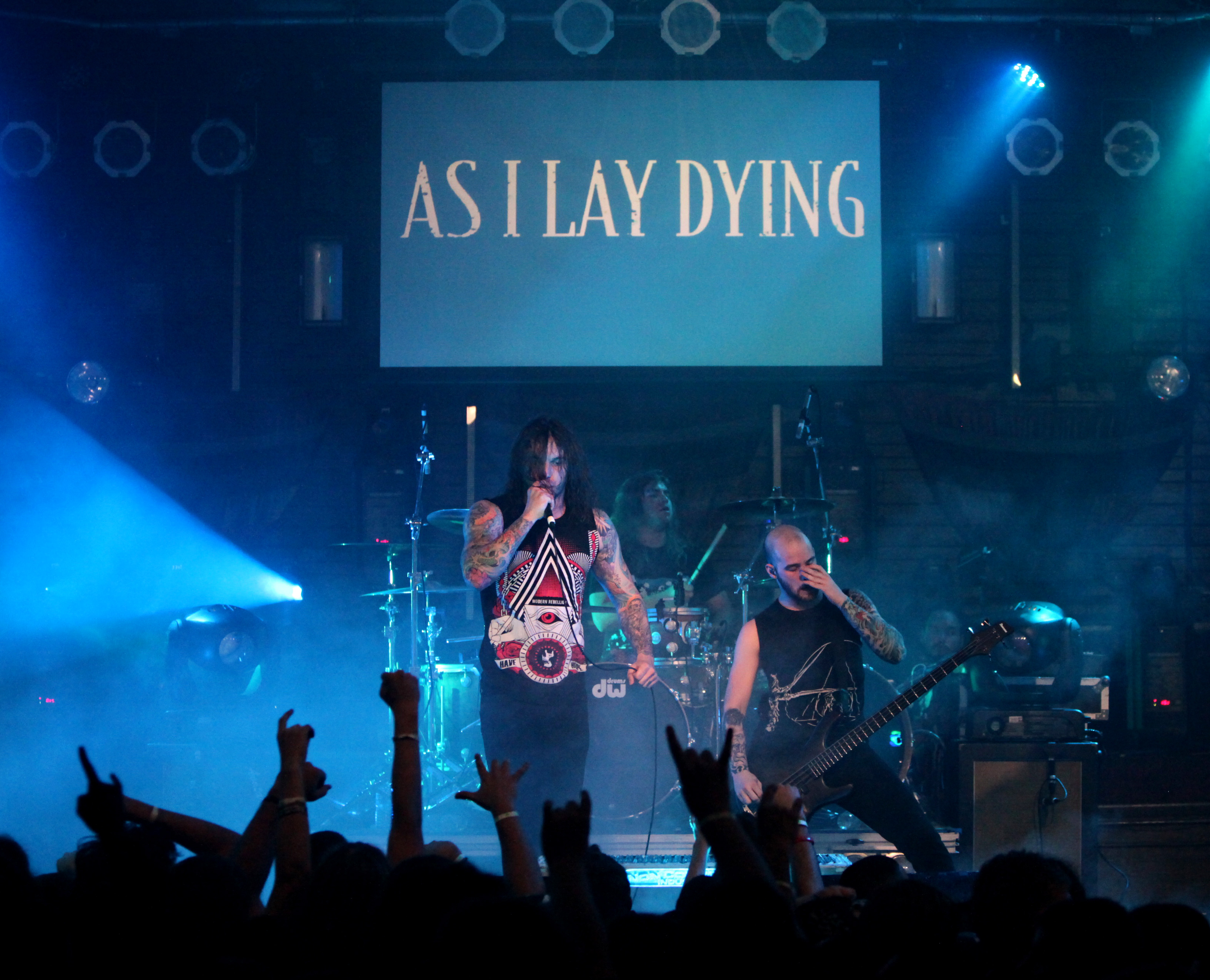
As I Lay Dying performing in Fort Lauderdale, Florida, in 2011

In 2010 the band toured in support of The Powerless Rise, headlining the majority of their shows. In the first half of the year, the band embarked on a US tour with Demon Hunter, blessthefall, and War of Ages. This was followed by a mid-2010 headlining tour titled "The Cool Tour" across the US, and a headlining tour across US/Canada that also featured All That Remains, Unearth, and Carnifex. The band's final headline tour of the year was in Europe, with Heaven Shall Burn, Suicide Silence, and Sylosis.

In February 2011, the band headlined a US tour with support from Winds of Plague and After the Burial. The band then toured in late April/early May with Trivium, in support of Disturbed, on the "Music as a Weapon" tour in Australia and New Zealand. Then at the end of May and beginning of June, the band headlined a few performances with Heaven Shall Burn.

On November 8, 2011, As I Lay Dying released a compilation, Decas, in honor of the band's ten-year anniversary. The album featured three new, original songs; four cover versions of songs by bands such as Slayer, Judas Priest and Descendents; a re-recorded medley that uses parts of several songs taken from Beneath the Encasing of Ashes; and four remixes, consisting of one song from each of their albums since Frail Words Collapse. The album's first track "Paralyzed" was released as a lyric video on September 13, 2011, and as a free download on iTunes on November 7, the day before the album's release. The band embarked on the "A Decade of Destruction" tour, coinciding with the release of the album, from November to December 2011.

=== Awakened, Tim Lambesis' trial and hiatus (2012–2016) ===
On January 25, 2012, an announcement revealed that the band would be playing the Mayhem Festival of 2012 with Slipknot, Slayer, Motörhead, Anthrax, The Devil Wears Prada, Asking Alexandria, Whitechapel, Upon A Burning Body, I, the Breather, Betraying the Martyrs, and Dirtfedd. The band announced in April 2012 that Bill Stevenson, who had previously worked with NOFX and Rise Against, would be the producer for their sixth album.

On June 22, 2012, the band announced that their sixth album would be titled Awakened and the first single "Cauterize" was released on June 25, 2012. On September 12, 2012, As I Lay Dying released their second single "A Greater Foundation" with a corresponding music video. The album was released on September 25, 2012, and "Cauterize" was available on the band's website as a free download for a 24-hour period. As I Lay Dying won the "Metal Band of the Year" award from Loudwire in 2012, beating other well-known bands, including Anthrax and Lamb of God. Subsequently, prior to his criminal charges, Lambesis started a new band entitled Pyrithion with guitarist Ryan Glisan, formerly of Allegaeon. They released one EP as a band.

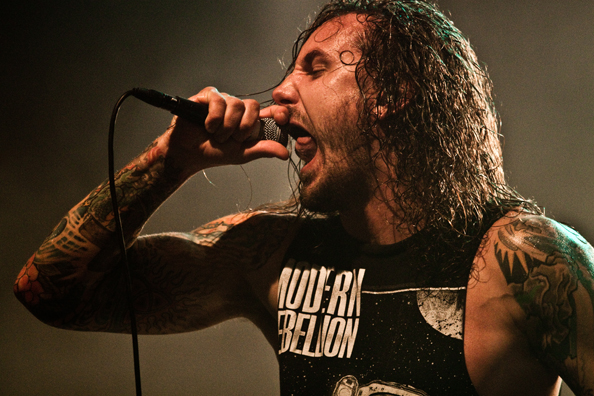
The arrest, trial and imprisonment of vocalist Tim Lambesis caused the band to go on an indefinite hiatus in 2014.

On May 7, 2013, Lambesis was arrested in Oceanside, California, US after hiring an undercover detective to kill his estranged wife. The report was made by the San Diego County Sheriff's Department, leaving the future of the band uncertain. On the following day, the band released a statement in which they said: "The legal process is taking its course and we have no more information than you do. There are many unanswered questions, and the situation will become clearer in the coming days and weeks. We'll keep you informed as best we can." They also stated that their thoughts were "with Tim, his family, and with everyone else affected by this terrible situation." Eight days later, the band cancelled their mid-2013 tour with Killswitch Engage, stating that "we feel that it is best for the band to be off the road while the current situation gets sorted". During the month of his initial arrest, Lambesis pleaded "not guilty" and his lawyer stated: "His thought processes were devastatingly affected by his steroid use." On February 25, 2014, Lambesis changed his plea from "not guilty" to "guilty" and consequently faced a potential sentence of nine years in prison.

Rather than continue on without Lambesis, Mancino, along with former members Phil Sgrosso, Nick Hipa, and Josh Gilbert, decided to focus on a different style of music under a different band name, Wovenwar, with Shane Blay as the vocalist, This project took shape long before Lambesis' plea. although Mancino still remained a member of As I Lay Dying. During this period of time, Lambesis was also working on music and found time to release the third Austrian Death Machine album, titled Triple Brutal. On May 16, 2014, Lambesis was sentenced to six years in prison, with 48 days credit for time served.

=== Lambesis' release, reunion and new music (2016–2018) ===
Lambesis was released from prison on probation in December 2016. After his release he began reaching out to the other members of the band looking to apologize in person starting with Mancino and Gilbert. After months of silence Gilbert and Mancino eventually met with Lambesis and began speaking with him regularly after noting positive changes in his character. Lambesis attempted to reconnect with Sgrosso and Hipa following his meetings with Gilbert and Mancino, who, as a result of Lambesis' actions and the strain it put on their relationships, had stopped speaking to each other following the recording of the second Wovenwar album. Sgrosso explained in a reunion-related discussion video posted by the band on June 16, 2018, that he initially replied to all of Lambesis' emails with explicit expressions of having no desire to speak with him. Sgrosso explained that his disdain with Lambesis started well before his arrest and took relief in not having to be in a band with him anymore upon Lambesis' arrest. His relationship with Hipa deteriorated due to what both described as not being able to deal with the weight of the aftermath properly. Hipa explained that while he initially felt empathy towards Lambesis after his tearful courtroom apology, the feelings of empathy were short-lived following Lambesis' interview with Alternative Press, which Hipa claimed read like "one long excuse". After Lambesis made his public apology, Sgrosso finally agreed to meet with Lambesis and claimed Lambesis evolved into a different person than he was for the years leading up to his arrest which inspired him to reach out to Hipa to rekindle their friendship. Hipa was the last to speak with Lambesis due to what Hipa described as not being able to escape the shadow of Lambesis' arrest and the mental and physical effects it took on him. After reconnecting with Sgrosso and reading Lambesis' apology, he agreed to meet with Lambesis as a means to "let go of his hatred" and claimed that Lambesis owned up and took responsibility for every one of his actions he was called on.

Over the course of the tail end of Lambesis' incarceration and release, the band's public opinion towards Lambesis softened. Mancino did an interview primarily discussing Wovenwar, but also spoke about As I Lay Dying on MetalSucks' podcast. He stated that, contrary to popular beliefs, that Hipa, Sgrosso and Gilbert are still technically a part of As I Lay Dying due to their record contract and in another interview stated that he has "no ill will" towards Lambesis and wished him well. Hipa, when on an episode of Jamey Jasta's podcast when asked about a reunion commented "what it comes down to is what makes sense with what we have going on in our lives. And we've got a lot of important things going on that don't relate to that and we've made commitments to, and that's what we are honoring at this moment. Honestly it's just not something we try and consume our thoughts with. Because it's like we have families, businesses, professions, and a band—and all these things we're super invested into. It's like all of our attention is there with that at the moment."

On September 2, 2017, Metal Injection reported that Lambesis was working on new music and planned to release it under the As I Lay Dying name and that none of the pre-hiatus lineup aside from Lambesis would be returning. This would later be proven false, as on June 8, 2018, the band released the music video for "My Own Grave", confirming through the video that the lineup of Lambesis, Hipa, Sgrosso, Gilbert and Mancino had reunited. They performed their first show in five years—which sold out in four minutes—at the SOMA Sidestage in their hometown of San Diego. The band has stated the single was their first and only song written since their formal reunion in February 2018 and had no concrete plans past releasing the single and playing the SOMA show.

The news of their reunion drew particularly divisive reactions from fans and media outlets. While fan and critical reception of the band's reunion and comeback single were met largely with praise, others were openly skeptical on supporting Tim Lambesis following his prison sentence. Most notably was MetalSucks, who published an editorial that they will no longer be writing about the band with multiple outlets voicing their support for MetalSucks' decision. On June 16, 2018, the date of their comeback show at the SOMA, the band published a video on their official YouTube account addressing the questions and criticisms fans and critics of the band had and explaining the terms in detail of the reunion.

In July 2018, the band announced their first European headlining tour for December 2018. A day later, they announced their North American tour for November 2018. A vast majority of the shows sold out immediately. While tickets sold out quickly, some venues and festivals received a public backlash for booking the band because of Lambesis' crimes and decided to cancel the band's performances. Spain's Resurrection Fest announced it would be dropping As I Lay Dying from its bill in October 2018, and months later in January 2019, the Memphis, Tennessee venue Growlers cancelled their previously scheduled show in April 2019. Growlers released a statement that acknowledged Lambesis' public message from 2018, but stated: "After hearing the combined voice of disheartened friends, local bands, and patrons, locally owned concert venue and bar, Growlers, has cancelled their scheduled show with As I Lay Dying, previously set for April 5th, and will replace it with a local show to benefit victims of domestic violence [...] Not everyone was ready to give Lambesis a second chance, and Growlers has created controversy in Memphis for booking his band."

=== Shaped by Fire and line-up changes (2019–2022) ===
They embarked on a tour in March 2019 with Phinehas, Currents and Frost Koffin as support. On April 12, 2019, the band released a music video for "Redefined", including a guest appearance by August Burns Red frontman Jake Luhrs. On April 14, the band announced the "Shaped by Fire" tour of Europe with support from Chelsea Grin, Unearth and Fit for a King running from September 2019 and concluding in October. On July 15, the band announced the North American dates of the "Shaped by Fire" Tour with direct support from After the Burial and Emmure to begin on November 15 at the House of Blues in Las Vegas and conclude on December 14 with a hometown show at the Soma San Diego. Details of their forthcoming album, Shaped by Fire, were leaked through Nuclear Blast's European website with a projected release date of September 20, 2019. On August 9, the band officially announced their first album in seven years, Shaped by Fire, would be released through Nuclear Blast Records, along with releasing the album's title track. On September 13, the band released "Blinded" as the album's fourth single along with an accompanying music video.

In March 2020, as a way of supporting their crew during the COVID-19 pandemic, they released an additional song, "Destruction or Strength", a B-side from Shaped by Fire album sessions. In May 2020, another music video for the song "Torn Between" was released.

On August 15, 2020, it was reported that Nick Hipa might have left the band, as he no longer performed with them and disassociated his personal social media accounts with the band. Hipa officially confirmed his departure one year later on August 31, 2021, noting that behaviors resulting from being in the band led to his decision to leave it: "There is tremendous good that can be accomplished through singular focus on the power of music. However to my memory and recent experience, it comes at the cost of tolerating behavior which at times mistreats, disrespects, and hurts other people." He further elaborated that the power and reasoning behind As I Lay Dying's reunion had faded in favor of superficial pursuits, which he did not wish to be a part of. On September 24, 2021, the band unveiled a new single, "Roots Below".

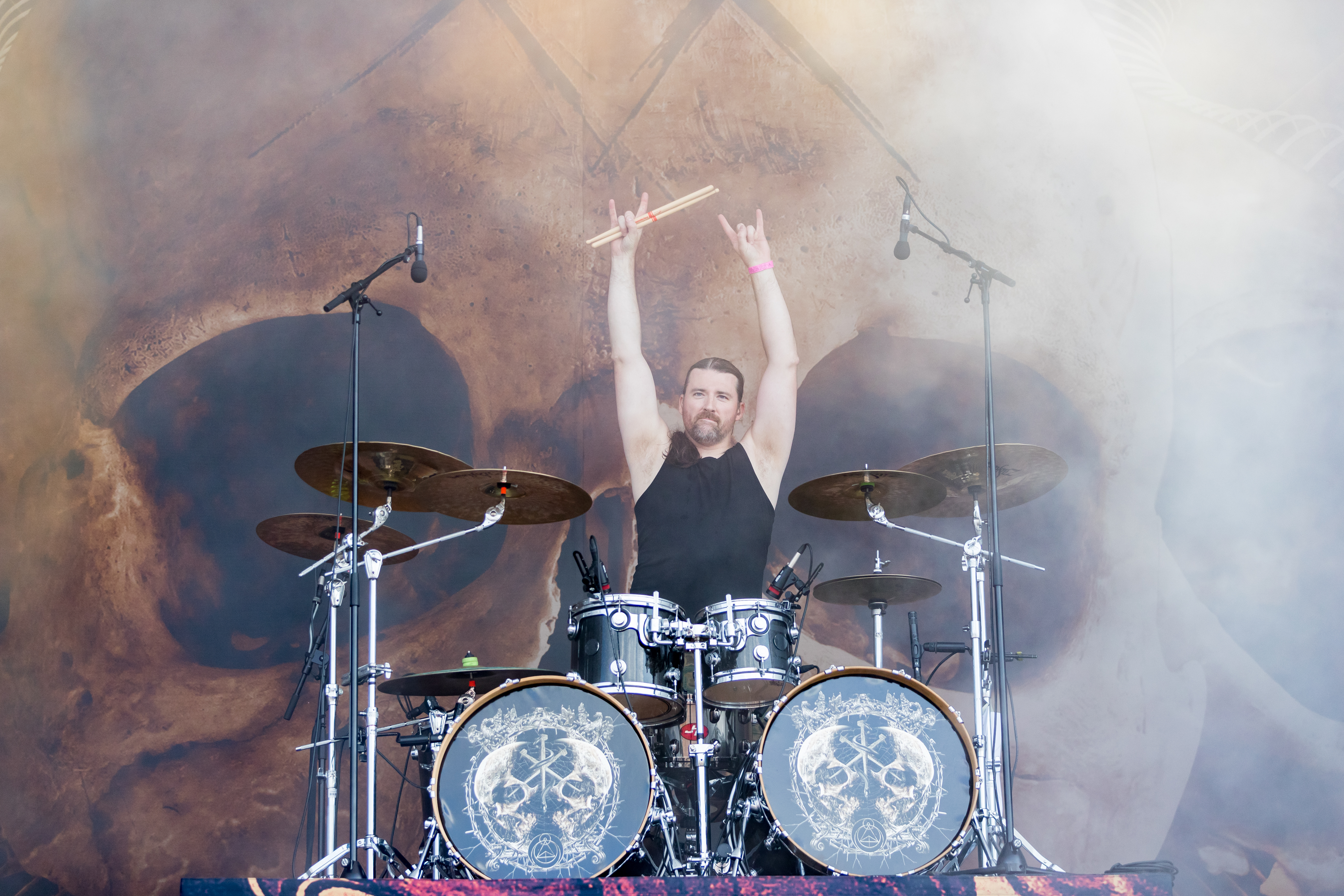
Former drummer Nick Pierce (also formerly of Unearth) at Wacken Open Air 2022

On May 16, 2022, it was announced that bassist and sung vocalist Josh Gilbert left the band after 15 years. The band announced Ryan Neff from Miss May I would play bass on their upcoming tour. Around the same time, it was announced Unearth guitarist Ken Susi would play guitar on the band's upcoming tour as a replacement for Hipa. Susi would later leave Unearth and join As I Lay Dying as a full-time member, as announced on March 3, 2023. On June 9, 2022, drummer Jordan Mancino announced he would be sitting out of the band's upcoming tour dates due to "a number of ongoing internal issues that have not yet been resolved". Drummer Nick Pierce, also formerly of Unearth, was announced as the band's live drummer for their upcoming tour. A week later, the band claimed Mancino "ex-communicated himself from the band" and that moving forward without him "was the only option", implying he was no longer in the band.

=== Through Storms Ahead and band deterioration (2023–2025) ===
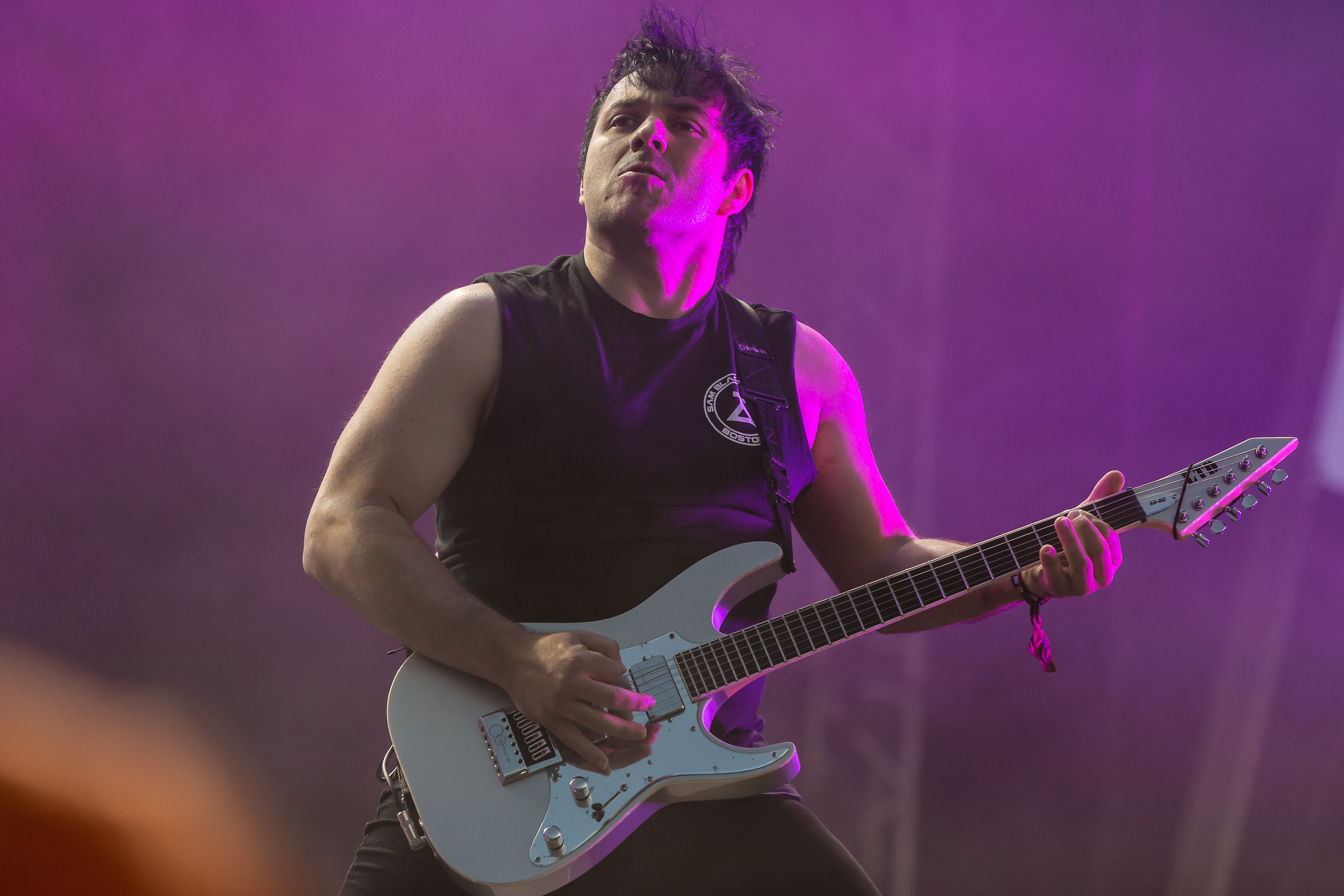
Former guitarist Ken Susi (also formerly of Unearth) at Rockharz Open Air 2023

The band toured Europe in the summer of 2022, which included a performance at the Wacken Open Air festival. Following the tour, Tim Lambesis announced the band had plans to release an album in 2023. On June 15, 2023, the band announced that mixing the album was underway.

On May 22, 2024, the band released a new single, "Burden", along with an accompanying music video. On July 9, 2024, a second single/music video, "The Cave We Fear to Enter", was dropped, followed by "We are the Dead" on September 11, 2024, featuring Alex Terrible of Slaughter to Prevail and Tom Barber of Chelsea Grin. On the same day as the latter single's release date, the band's eighth album, Through Storms Ahead, was announced for release on November 15, 2024. On October 10, 2024, the band released another single off the album titled "Whitewashed Tomb".

On October 18, 2024, Ryan Neff announced his departure from the band, citing a need to benefit his "personal and professional journey". Just six days later, Ken Susi and Nick Pierce also announced their departures from the band, stating that their "personal morals have been tested to a breaking point" and needing to preserve "personal health and integrity". In conjunction with Susi and Pierce, the band's touring manager resigned as well, effectively cancelling the planned European tour for the album. On October 30, Phil Sgrosso announced his departure from the band, adding that the band "no longer offers a healthy or safe environment for anyone involved" and that he could not "enable further actions that could negatively affect anyone working within this space", leaving Tim Lambesis the sole remaining member of the band. In an April 2025 podcast interview, Ken Susi revealed that the band fractured following an incident where Lambesis assaulted his wife in the kitchen of Susi's home, with the incident being caught on Susi's security camera. Following Susi bringing this to Phil Sgrosso's attention and informing Sgrosso of Susi's pending departure due to the incident, Sgrosso requested Lambesis to step down and leave the band, which Lambesis refused. Since Lambesis would not exit the band, Sgrosso and the rest of the band departed themselves. "Nobody wanted to be a part of it anymore." Susi elaborated in the podcast, "They didn’t care about the finances. They didn’t care about anything. And that’s really what went down—I just don’t like 'the band broke up because of communication problems and everyone followed Phil' or, you know, Tim literally blew up the tours that I was supposed to be on, right? With all the income that I was going to make on that. I never got paid on royalties for the songs that I did write, or help write, on the record—Just don't abuse your wife in my fucking house and put my integrity on the line. And someone need[ed] to say something—All Tim really had to do is get out of jail and just scream into a fucking mic and be cool. And that was hard".

Lambesis addressed the situation on November 4, 2024, claiming he was holding firm to his vision for "the future of AILD even when others think it should go another direction", also attributing miscommunication and "patterns of interaction" to the mass exodus, adding his support for their decisions to leave. Lambesis also stated that he intended to continue As I Lay Dying with a more positive and collaborative environment. A week later, he announced their participation in the Welcome to Rockville festival taking place on May 16, 2025, in Daytona Beach, Florida. The fifth and final single from Through Storms Ahead titled "The Void Within" was released on November 13, 2024.

On November 27, 2024, a home security video surfaced that appeared to show Lambesis in a heated argument with his now-estranged wife, striking himself repeatedly in the head and chest. Lambesis quickly responded, saying that he was filing for divorce and a restraining order against his wife, alleging that she had been physically and emotionally abusing him, and that he would also be initiating a domestic violence investigation as a result. Rumors of abuse had been circulating during the band's October departures, but were denied by Lambesis' wife, who later alleged that it was Lambesis who was physically and emotionally abusive towards her. On January 17, 2025, more footage surfaced that appeared to show Lambesis striking his pet dog. The allegations had resulted in Welcome to Rockville removing the band from their roster and replacing them with Miss May I, and a public petition with 70,000 signatures began circulating online with the goal of having California authorities open an investigation on Lambesis over said alleged animal abuse.

=== New line-up and self-titled ninth album (2025–present) ===
On May 20, 2025, Lambesis announced a European 20th anniversary tour of Shadows Are Security to begin in the fall in Russia, although touring members had not been announced.

On October 8, 2025, the band released the single "Echoes", coupled with the announcement of a new lineup with bassist/clean vocalist Chris Clancy (of Mutiny Within), guitarists Bill Hudson and Don Vedda, and drummer Tim Yeung.

On November 19, 2025, the band released their second single with the new lineup, “If I Fall” from their then untitled album. In November of 2025 & March of 2026 this new lineup went on tour in Russia in celebration of Shadows Are Security 20th anniversary. They later toured in Mexico City on December 5, 2025 & South America in late April to early May of 2026. On May 12, 2026, the band announced the final Shadows dates for the 20th anniversary of Shadows Are Security. On June 23rd, 2026, the band announced that Kill The Lights and The Curse Within would join them for the final Shadows dates. On September 8th, Kill The Lights had to withdraw from the tour due to “unforeseen financial circumstances” around production and travel costs.

Two more singles, "Polarized" and "Retribution", were released on September 15, 2026, followed shortly by the announcement that the band's self-titled ninth album will be released on February 5, 2027. The band will be supporting the album on an album release tour in North America joined with Immortal Disfigurement in February & March 2027.

On November 3, 2026, the band released their fifth single “The Cost To Stay”, the fifth single off of their self-titled album. On November 18, the band announced the European leg of their album release tour for late April to mid May of 2027.

== Musical style, influences, and legacy ==
The band performing at Wacken Open Air 2011

As I Lay Dying is considered a prominent metalcore band, and more specifically as melodic metalcore, Christian metal Christian death metal, and thrash metal, though the band has disputed the Christian label. Additionally, the band has utilized many elements of melodic death metal throughout their career. In a review of Beneath the Encasing of Ashes, Bradley Torreano of AllMusic described the band's sound as a blend of heavy metal, hardcore, and grindcore. Heavy metal writer Garry Sharpe-Young described the band as a "Christian Hardcore act employing the Grind edged vocals of singer Tim Lambesis and a distinct hint of Scandinavian guitar chug." As I Lay Dying's influences include In Flames, Living Sacrifice, Iron Maiden, Slayer, At the Gates, Pantera, Megadeth, Fear Factory, Cannibal Corpse, Thin Lizzy, Shai Hulud, Dark Tranquillity, Metallica, Judas Priest, and Earth Crisis.

As I Lay Dying have been considered among the big four of the metalcore genre alongside Killswitch Engage, The Dillinger Escape Plan and Converge. Loudwire listed the band among the 50 most important metal bands of the 21st century writing "As I Lay Dying were among the initial surge in this stylistic explosion, showing a deft ability to groove, beat down and soar on triumphant moments. Their lyrics provided comfort in life’s darkest moments for listeners and implored them to come out on top of it all." Bands such as Miss I May, Thrown into Exile, Impending Doom, and Vampires Everywhere! have cited the band as an influence.

== Christianity ==
Although the band has stated on various occasions throughout their career that all of the members of the group are Christian, lyricist and lead singer Tim Lambesis has given mixed commentary on the subject. When asked in 2008 if the members were "a Christian band" or "Christians in a band", Lambesis stated "I'm not sure what the difference is between five Christians playing in a band and a Christian band, if you truly believe something, then it should affect every area of your life. All five of us are Christians. I believe that change should start with me first, and as a result, our lyrics do not come across very 'preachy.' Many of our songs are about life, struggles, mistakes, relationships and other issues that don't fit entirely in the spiritual category. However, all of these topics are written about through my perspective as a Christian." Furthermore, during an August 2010 radio interview on the Christian metal radio show The Full Armor of God Broadcast, Lambesis stated "I can only really write about what I'm passionate about in life, so naturally my faith, my belief in the teachings of Jesus and His resurrection come across in our lyrics."

However, in later years, Lambesis showed an increasing philosophical skepticism towards Christianity and religion in general. Court documents stated Lambesis emailed his wife Meggan in August 2012, while on tour with As I Lay Dying, asking for a divorce and stating he "no longer believed in God". In explaining some of the lyrics from Awakened, Lambesis stated on his personal Tumblr account that his studies of theology had led him to the conclusion that "tradition and truth are often at odds with each other", and while he "didn't hate all religious belief", he was finding it "very difficult for [him] to outline exactly who it is that's worth siding with." He also quoted the book Pagan Christianity by George Barna and Frank Viola, claiming that both "Protestant and Catholic denominations have poisonous roots". While on house arrest in July 2013, after being charged with soliciting his wife's murder, Lambesis published a blog post in which he obliquely confirmed his previous loss of faith in Christianity. In 2014, Lambesis said that although they were marketed as a Christian band, the members privately considered themselves atheists. Following this statement, guitarist Nick Hipa responded by calling these claims slanderous and defamatory. In an April 2014 statement, the band stated that Lambesis "has spent much of the last year reevaluating what originally convinced him to abandon belief in God. After much brokenness and repentance he sees things differently, considers himself a follower of Jesus, someone submitted to the will of God, or whatever you want to call it. That's for him to talk about when he's comfortable and only time will tell if he is sincere."

== Band members ==
Current

- Tim Lambesis – lead vocals, keyboards (2000–2014, 2017–present), clean vocals (2000–2003), guitars, bass (2000–2001)
- Bill Hudson – guitars (2025–present)
- Don Vedda – guitars, backing vocals (2025–present)
- Chris Clancy – bass, clean vocals (2025–present)
- Tim Yeung – drums (2025–present)

Former

- Jeremy Rojas – guitars (2001)
- Noah Chase – bass (2001)
- Tommy Garcia – guitars, bass, backing vocals (2001–2002)
- Brandon Hays – bass, guitars (2002–2003)
- Jasun Krebs – guitars (2002–2003; died 2024)
- Aaron Kennedy – bass (2003)
- Evan White – guitars, bass (2001–2003)
- Phil Sgrosso – guitars, keyboards, backing vocals (2003–2014, 2018–2024)
- Clint Norris – bass, clean vocals (2003–2006)
- Nick Hipa – guitars, backing vocals (2003–2014, 2018–2020)
- Josh Gilbert – bass, clean vocals (2006–2014, 2018–2022; touring/session musician 2006–2007)
- Jordan Mancino – drums (2000–2014, 2018–2022)
- Ryan Neff – bass, clean vocals (2022–2024)
- Ken Susi – guitars, backing vocals (2022–2024)
- Nick Pierce – drums (2022–2024)

Former touring musicians

- Ruben Gutierrez – guitars (2001; died 2021)
- Caylen Denuccio – bass (2002)
- Chris Lindstrom – guitars (2001, 2003)
- Mark Macdonald – guitars (2003–2004)
- David Arthur – clean vocals (2005)
- Duane Reed – backing vocals (2007)
- Chad Ackerman – guitars (2002); backing vocals (session; 2007)
- Justin Foley – drums (2009)
- Joey Bradford – backing vocals (2012)
- Brandon Morales – guitars, backing vocals (2022)
- Alex Lopez – drums (2022)
- Alexander Dovgan – drums (2025, 2026)

Former session musicians

- Dylan Plymale – guitars (2003)
- Dave Arthur – guitar (2005)

== Discography ==
Studio albums

- Beneath the Encasing of Ashes (2001)
- Frail Words Collapse (2003)
- Shadows Are Security (2005)
- An Ocean Between Us (2007)
- The Powerless Rise (2010)
- Awakened (2012)
- Shaped by Fire (2019)
- Through Storms Ahead (2024)
- As I Lay Dying (2027)

== Awards and nominations ==
Grammy Awards

Year	Nominee / work	Award	Result
2008	"Nothing Left"	Best Metal Performance	Nominated

San Diego Music Awards

Year	Nominee / work	Award	Result
2005	As I Lay Dying	Artist of the Year	Won
2007	As I Lay Dying	Artist of the Year	Won
2008	As I Lay Dying	Artist of the Year	Won
2011	As I Lay Dying	Best Hard Rock Band	Won
2012	Awakened	Best Hard Rock Album	Nominated

MTV2 Music Awards

Year	Nominee / work	Award	Result
2007	As I Lay Dying	Ultimate Metal God	Won

Metal Hammer Golden Gods Awards

Year	Nominee / work	Award	Result
2008	"Nothing Left"	Best Video	Nominated

Hollywood Film Fest awards

Year	Nominee / work	Award	Result
2009	"The Sound of Truth"	Best Music Video	Won

Loudwire Music Awards

Year	Nominee / work	Award	Result
2012	As I Lay Dying	Metal Band of the Year	Won
2013	"No Lungs to Breathe"	Death Match Hall of Fame	Won

Metal Storm Awards

Year	Nominee / work	Award	Result
2007	An Ocean Between Us	Best Metalcore Album	Nominated
2010	The Powerless Rise	The Best Hardcore / Metalcore / Deathcore Album	Nominated
2012	Awakened	The Best Hardcore / Metalcore / Deathcore Album	Nominated
