= Awakened (album) =

Studio album by As I Lay Dying
- Released: September 25, 2012
- Recorded: 2012
- Genre: Melodic metalcore; thrash metal
- Length: 42:46
- Label: Metal Blade
- Producer: Bill Stevenson; As I Lay Dying; Jason Livermore

As I Lay Dying chronology
Decas (2011)	Awakened (2012)	Shaped by Fire (2019)

Singles from Awakened
- 1. "Cauterize" Released: June 25, 2012; 2. "A Greater Foundation" Released: September 11, 2012

Awakened is the sixth studio album by American metalcore band As I Lay Dying. It is the final album released by the band before their hiatus in 2014. The album was released on September 25, 2012, through Metal Blade Records. The album was produced by Bill Stevenson (the drummer of Descendents) and recorded at The Blasting Room in Fort Collins, Colorado and Lambesis Studios in San Diego, California. On June 22, 2012, the album title, release date, and first single were announced. On June 25, the first single "Cauterize" was released for free download and became available online for purchase the following day. On June 27, a lyric video for "Cauterize." The band also created an event on Facebook inviting fans to participate in a music video shoot for "A Greater Foundation."" Fans were able to pre-order a copy on the Rockstar Mayhem Festival tour of 2012. The band released clips of the album via SoundCloud prior to the release date, and on September 11, the music video for "A Greater Foundation" was released.

== Background ==
In February 2012 As I Lay Dying announced that they were in the process of writing their fifth album, and would be entering the studio in April. In April the band announced that the album would be produced by Bill Stevenson.

In June, the band announced the album would be titled "Awakened," and on June 22 the band premiered a new song, "Cauterize," via Sirius Satellite Radio. The track was made available for streaming for 24 hours the following Sunday at midnight PST, and was briefly available as a free download. The band also shared that "Awakened" would be released on September 25, and that they were seeking "100 athletic men" to serve as extras in the music video for the track "A Greater Foundation." On the 27th, the band posted a lyric video for the track "Cauterize." On the 29th, the band unveiled the album's artwork, which was created by Metastazis with Tiffanie Uldry.

On September 10, the band uploaded a portion of the track "Whispering Silence" to SoundCloud. On the 11th, the band released the track "A Greater Foundation" as the record's first single. The release featured an accompanying music video, and debuted via PureVolume and RCRD LBL. The video was produced by Drew Russ and produced by Robby Starbuck. The video was released On the 14th, the band uploaded a portion of the track "No Lungs to Breathe" via SoundCloud. On the 24th, the band made the entirety of the album available via streaming at AOL Music. In February 2013, the band released a lyric video, created by Nick Hipa, for the track "No Lungs to Breathe."

== Reception ==
Professional ratings
Aggregate scores
Source	Rating
Metacritic	78%
Review scores
Source	Rating
About.com	3.5/5 stars
AllMusic	3.5/5 stars
Exclaim!	Positive
Metal Forces	10/10

Overall reception towards the album was positive. Mark Fisher of Metal Forces gave the album a 10/10. Commercially, the album debuted on the Billboard 200 at #11, and sold over 28,000 copies in its first week.

== Track listing ==
All lyrics are written by Tim Lambesis; all music is composed by As I Lay Dying.

No.	Title	Length
1.	"Cauterize"	3:37
2.	"A Greater Foundation"	3:46
3.	"Resilience"	4:07
4.	"Wasted Words"	4:20
5.	"Whispering Silence"	4:30
6.	"Overcome"	4:36
7.	"No Lungs to Breathe"	4:04
8.	"Defender"	4:04
9.	"Washed Away" (instrumental)	1:00
10.	"My Only Home"	4:05
11.	"Tear Out My Eyes"	4:37
Total length:		42:46

iTunes/Limited Edition
No.	Title	Length
12.	"Unwound" (B-Side demo)	3:58
13.	"A Greater Foundation" (extended demo version)	3:58
Total length:		50:42

Japanese Edition
No.	Title	Length
12.	"Nothing Left" (Live Bonus Track)
13.	"Sound of Truth" (Live Bonus Track)

Limited Edition DVD
No.	Title	Length
1.	"Making of Awakened"
2.	"I Never Wanted" (music video)
3.	"Parallels" (music video)
4.	"Anodyne Sea" (music video)
5.	"Behind the scenes of "Anodyne Sea" video shoot"
6.	"Electric Eye" (Judas Priest cover, music video)
7.	"Paralyzed" (lyric video)
8.	"Cauterize" (lyric video)

== Personnel ==
Production and performance credits are adapted from the album liner notes.

As I Lay Dying

- Tim Lambesis – unclean vocals
- Nick Hipa – guitar, backing vocals
- Phil Sgrosso – guitar, backing vocals, acoustic guitar, keyboards on "Wasted Words"
- Josh Gilbert – bass, clean vocals
- Jordan Mancino – drums

Additional musicians

- Joey Bradford – additional backing vocals, gang vocals
- Loniel Robinson – gang vocals
- Matt JR – gang vocals
- Lore JR – gang vocals
- Joey St. Lucas – gang vocals
- Amanda Dubord – gang vocals
- Vince Bifano – gang vocals
- Robert Pine – gang vocals
- Willow – gang vocals
- Matt Geise – gang vocals

Production

- Bill Stevenson – production, engineering, gang vocals
- Jason Livermore – production, engineering
- Andrew Berlin – engineering
- Daniel Castleman – assisting engineering
- Chris Beeble – assisting engineering
- Colin Richardson – mixing
- Carl Bown – mix engineering
- Ted Jensen – mastering
- metastazis.com – artwork, layout
- Tiffanie Uldry – artwork, layout
- Ty Watkins – photography

Studios

- The Blasting Room, Fort Collins, Colorado – drums, guitars
- Lambesis Studios, San Diego – bass, vocals
- Echelon Studios – additional vocals
- Treehouse Studios, Derbyshire, UK – mixing
- Sterling Sound – mastering

== Charts ==
Chart (2012)	Peak position
Austrian Albums (Ö3 Austria)	26
Belgian Albums (Ultratop Flanders)	147
Belgian Albums (Ultratop Wallonia)	122
Canadian Albums (Billboard)	12
German Albums (Offizielle Top 100)	21
Japanese Albums (Oricon)	98
Swiss Albums (Schweizer Hitparade)	52
UK Albums (OCC)	134
UK Independent Albums (OCC)	19
UK Rock & Metal Albums (OCC)	10
US Billboard 200	11
US Digital Albums (Billboard)	14
US Independent Albums (Billboard)	3
US Top Hard Rock Albums (Billboard)	1
US Top Rock Albums (Billboard)	6
US Indie Store Album Sales (Billboard)	3
