= Tim Lambesis =

American heavy metal singer

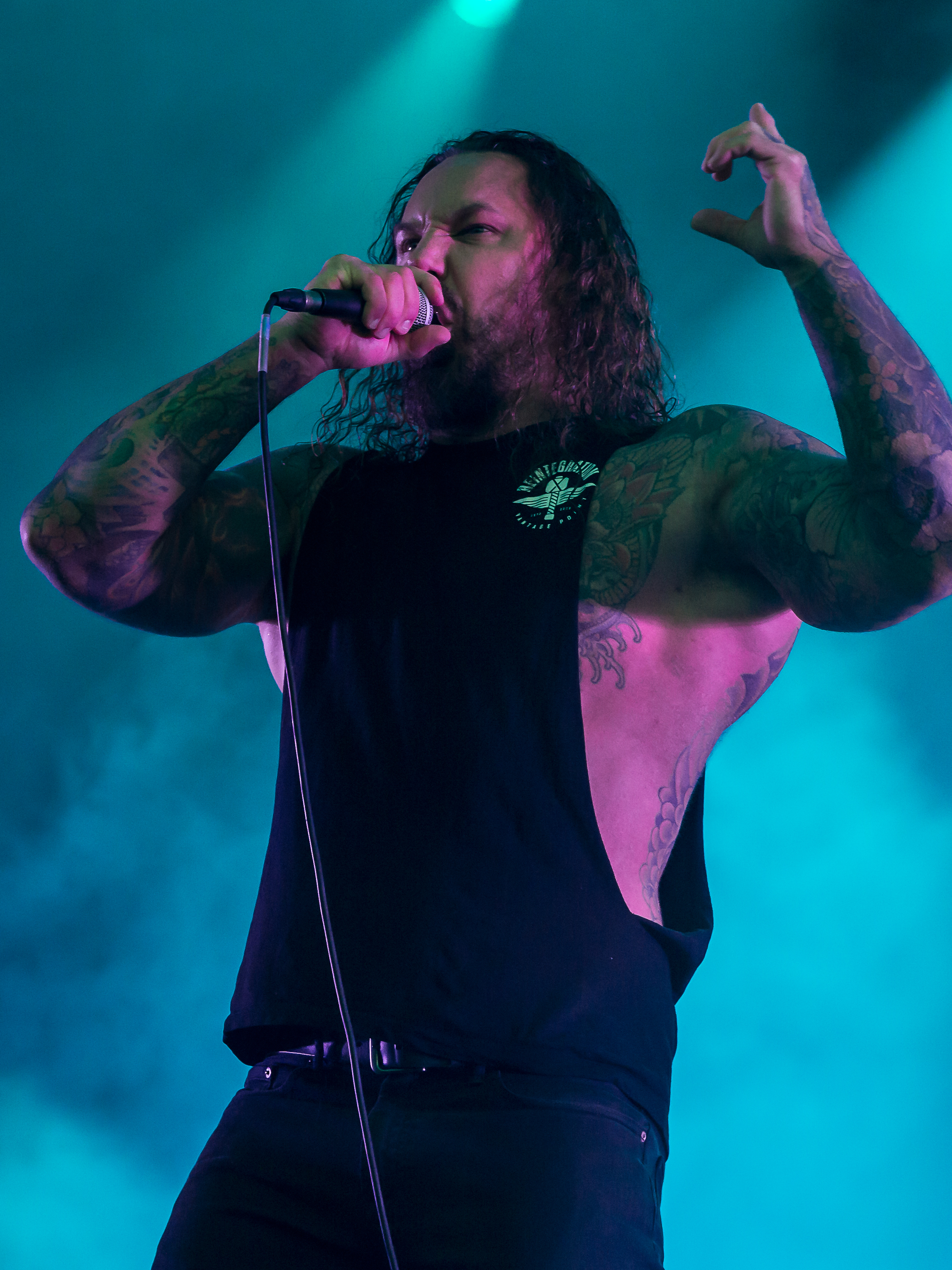
- Lambesis performing with As I Lay Dying in 2023

Background information
- Born: Timothy Peter Lambesis; November 21, 1980 (age 45)
- Origin: San Diego, California, U.S.
- Genres: Metalcore; Christian metal; thrash metal; death metal
- Occupations: Singer; record producer; songwriter
- Years active: 2000–2014; 2017–present
- Member of: Pyrithion; Austrian Death Machine; As I Lay Dying; Born Through Fire
- Formerly of: Point of Recognition; Society's Finest; Against the Mark
- Spouses: Meggan Murphy (m. 2004; div. 2012) Amanda Dubord (m. 2017; div. 2020) Danielle Norris (Dany Ciara) (m. 2022; div. 2024)
- Criminal information
- Status: Released on parole
- Conviction: Soliciting murder
- Penalty: 6 years in prison (paroled after 2 years)

Details
- Date apprehended: May 7, 2013

Timothy Peter Lambesis (born November 21, 1980) is an American singer, record producer, songwriter and convicted felon. He is best known as the founding member, lead vocalist, and the sole continuous member of the metalcore band As I Lay Dying.

Lambesis was arrested in 2013 after attempting to hire an undercover police officer to murder his wife. He pled guilty in 2014 and was sentenced to serve six years in prison. Since being released on parole in December 2016, he has gone through two different lineups of As I Lay Dying and released the albums Shaped by Fire and Through Storms Ahead in 2019 and 2024 respectively.

He also has a solo/side thrash metal project in tribute to actor Arnold Schwarzenegger, Austrian Death Machine, in which he performed all the instruments. He also formed a death metal band called Pyrithion and was the former guitar player for Society's Finest and Point of Recognition. Lambesis was a judge for the 8th and 10th annual Independent Music Awards to support independent artists' careers.

== Early life ==
Timothy Peter Lambesis was born on November 21, 1980, to Nick and Vicki Lambesis. Nick and Vicki founded an advertising firm in La Jolla, California, known as The Lambesis Agency, which handled international clients such as Coca-Cola, Airwalk, SKYY Vodka, Gold Peak Tea, Tacori, Bebe Stores and Campari, among others. The agency's work for Airwalk was profiled by Canadian journalist Malcolm Gladwell in his book The Tipping Point published in 2000. The company closed in 2019, with Nick co-founding a new agency called Sublym Digital in 2023.

Lambesis grew up in Southern California and was voted "Most Like Jesus" by classmates when he attended Santa Fe Christian School in Solana Beach, California as a teen. He attended Liberty University for a time and majored in religious studies.

== Career ==
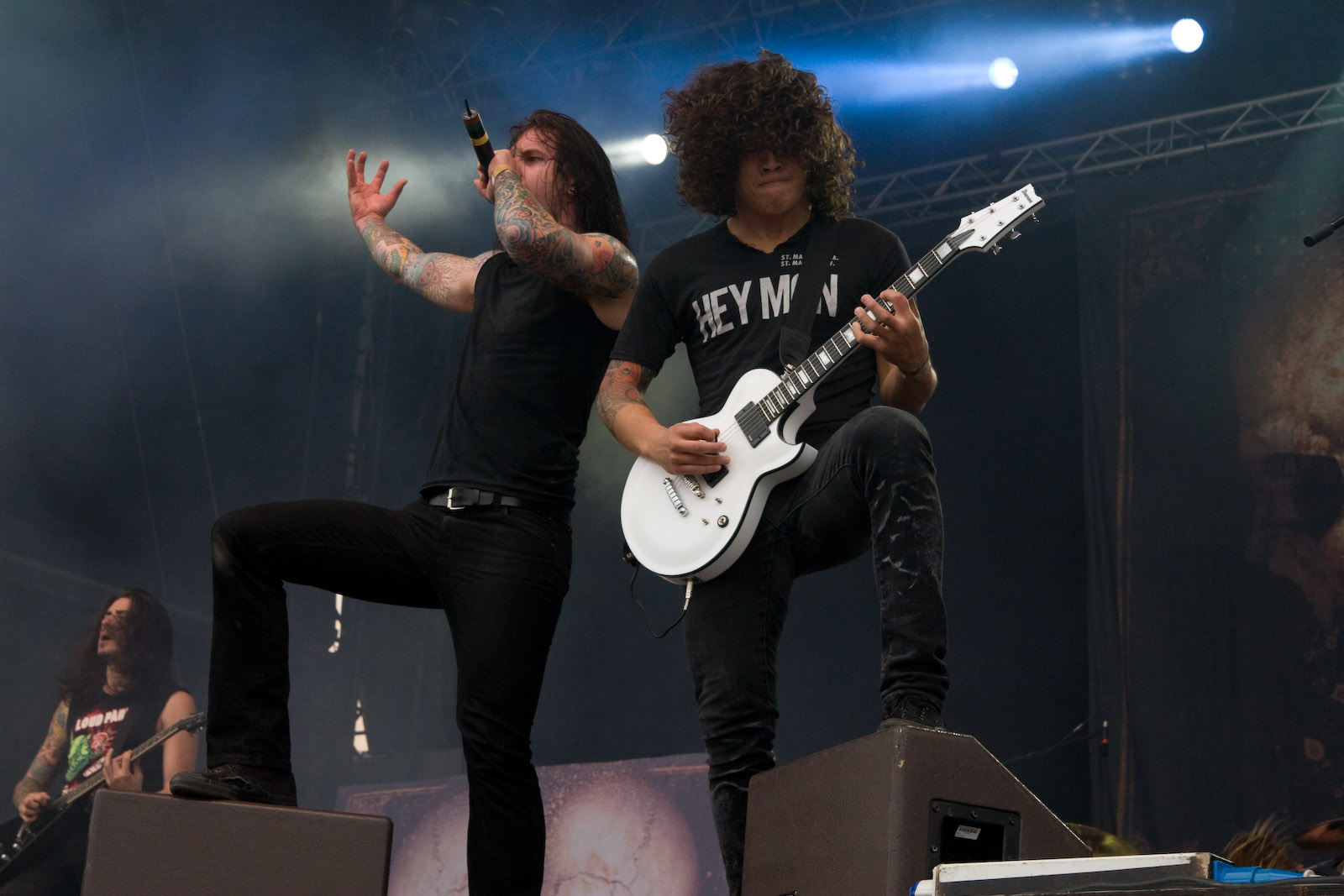
Lambesis (center) with As I Lay Dying at With Full Force 2007

Lambesis started his musical career while he was still in high school, playing bass in the first few bands he was in. He and Matt Carlson (drums) formed the band Against the Mark, where Lambesis would become the band's vocalist. The two would get a full band together, including bassist Jon Jameson. The band changed their name to Life Once Lost, but only for a short time, until they entered an indefinite hiatus. Lambesis left in 2000 to join Society's Finest, but only for a brief time, as they did not have plans to tour. Lambesis returned to California to restart Life Once Lost, but with a whole new lineup. The band discovered A Life Once Lost, which caused the band to change their name to As I Lay Dying. Lambesis hired Jordan Mancino, former drummer of Edge of Mortality, and Evan White. In 2001, Lambesis and Mancino joined Point of Recognition and recorded on the album Day of Defeat in 2002. The two quit soon after to further pursue As I Lay Dying.

Over the years, the band went through many lineup changes. Lambesis and Mancino were the only remaining original members and constant members until 2003, when 19-year-old guitarist Phil Sgrosso joined the band. The next year, in 2004, the band hired Nick Hipa as the band's lead guitarist. Hipa was playing previously with Evelynn, a band that was signed to Pluto Records, As I Lay Dying's former label. Bassist Clint Norris was, most likely, the band's most consistent bassist until his departure in 2007 and the introduction of Josh Gilbert. The five of them recorded and released An Ocean Between Us, including "Nothing Left", which was Grammy-nominated for "Best Metal Performance". In 2008, Lambesis and Destroy the Runner vocalist Chad Ackerman formed Austrian Death Machine, a parody metal band based around Arnold Schwarzenegger. The two recorded two releases, Total Brutal and A Very Brutal Christmas the same year. The next year saw the release of Double Brutal.

The band wrote and recorded The Powerless Rise, which was released in 2010 to much critical acclaim. In 2011, Austrian Death Machine released Jingle All the Way. Lambesis would release three albums over the next three years; Awakened with As I Lay Dying (2012), The Burden of Sorrow by Pyrithion, a side project with members of Allegaeon and The Famine (2013), and Triple Brutal with Austrian Death Machine (2014). In 2014, all of Lambesis' projects went on hiatus, due to his criminal acts.

In 2017, Lambesis resurrected As I Lay Dying, initially rumoured with all new members. After consolidation with the old members, the band reunited in form of the old lineup. On June 7, 2018, the band released a new single, "My Own Grave". On April 12, 2019, As I Lay Dying released another single, "Redefined", and on September 20, 2019, the band released their seventh studio album, Shaped by Fire, although three of the four reunited members would depart gradually afterwards. In 2021 he announced that he and guitarist Joey Alarcon of Wolves at the Gates are working on a new side project, Born Through Fire. The debut album "Purify and Refine" was released in 2023.

In October 2024, all members of As I Lay Dying, new and longterm, quit the band along with the touring manager, alluding to moral and safety reasons and leaving Lambesis the only member of the band, along with cancelling the scheduled European tour for their new album Through Storms Ahead. Lambesis addressed the sudden deterioration in a statement posted on social media, admitting to creating an unhealthy environment within the band and supporting his bandmates' decisions to leave; despite the mass exodus, Lambesis stated he will continue As I Lay Dying and that the upcoming album would still be released on November 15, 2024.

On October 8, 2025, Lambesis announced a new lineup with bassist/clean vocalist Chris Clancy, guitarists Bill Hudson and Don Vedda, and drummer Tim Yeung.

== Personal life ==
Lambesis is a bodybuilder and started his own YouTube fitness channel. He is also heavily tattooed. His tattoos include a "rocking Jesus," and cyborg Arnold Schwarzenegger, a Koi fish swimming upstream, which represents a quest for meaning and fulfillment, Hebrew writing, a cross, Jesus Christ in clouds, and his largest (completely covering his back), a samurai fighting a tiger, which represents the battle between reason and instinct.

Lambesis married Meggan Murphy in June 2004. They have two daughters and a son, all adopted from Ethiopia.

Lambesis has previously stated on multiple occasions that he is a Christian. During an August 2010 radio interview on The Full Armor of God Broadcast, Lambesis said "I can only really write about what I'm passionate about in life, so naturally my faith, my belief in the teachings of Jesus and his resurrection come across in our lyrics." He was described as a "follower of Jesus" once more.

Starting in 2012, Lambesis has made several statements indicating a change in his religious beliefs: in a post on his personal Tumblr page explaining some of the lyrics from the As I Lay Dying album Awakened (released September 2012), Lambesis stated that his studies of theology had led him to the conclusion that "tradition and truth are often at odds with each other". While he noted that he "didn't hate all religious belief" and was "still inspired by the words of [Jesus]", he was finding it "very difficult for to outline exactly who it is that's worth siding with", and was increasingly regarding "the god of tradition and ritual that I grew up with as less and less of a probable truth". He also quoted the book Pagan Christianity by George Barna and Frank Viola, noting that both "Protestant and Catholic denominations have poisonous roots".

In August 2012, Lambesis sent an email to his wife, Meggan Murphy-Lambesis, while on tour with As I Lay Dying in which he stated he no longer loved her, had engaged in an extramarital affair, and "no longer believed in God". They separated the same month. She filed papers in San Diego Superior Court one month later in September 2012 seeking a dissolution of their marriage, according to an online court database. In divorce papers, Murphy stated that Lambesis was obsessed with bodybuilding, spending "endless hours at the gym", and was wasting "thousands of dollars on tattoos". She also alleged that he had become "dangerously distracted" while watching their children, including falling asleep while they played in their pool, and had taken two last-minute trips to Florida to see an extramarital girlfriend. When not on tour, Lambesis lived in Del Mar, California. Murphy and their children live in Encinitas.

=== Solicitation of murder ===
On May 7, 2013, Lambesis was arrested in Oceanside, California, for attempting to hire a hitman to murder his estranged wife Meggan Murphy, and, according to the San Diego County Sheriff's Department, was charged with soliciting "an undercover detective to kill his wife." Lambesis approached someone at a gym and asked if he knew anyone who would kill his wife. Lambesis met with the undercover agent posing as a hitman, code name "Red", according to Deputy District Attorney Claudia Grasso. "Red" asked Lambesis if he wanted his wife of eight years gone, and Lambesis replied, "Yes, that's what I want." He then gave [the] undercover agent an envelope containing US$1,000 for expenses, pictures of his wife, her address, the code to get through a gate, and the date on which to kill her. Lambesis had directed the detective he believed to be a hitman to kill his wife while he was with his children so he would have an alibi. He agreed to pay $20,000 for the hit.

On May 9, 2013, Lambesis pled not guilty to a felony charge of solicitation of murder and was ordered held on $3 million bail as prosecutors deemed Lambesis a "flight risk" and "danger to the public". Lambesis' bandmates, representatives from management and Metal Blade Records, and band attorney Ian Friedman were in attendance at his arraignment. According to the District Attorney of the case, an audio recording of the transaction between Lambesis and the undercover detective exists and was reportedly used at the trial. A readiness conference was set for June 10, 2013, and a preliminary court date was scheduled for July 10, 2013. During the month of his initial arrest, Lambesis pled "not guilty" and his lawyer stated: "His thought processes were devastatingly affected by his steroid use." A new bail hearing was held for Lambesis on May 17, 2013, at which defense attorney Tom Warwick had bail reduced from $3 million to $2 million. Lambesis was released on bail on May 30. Lambesis was ordered to wear a GPS monitor, was subject to strict travel restrictions, and was unable to see or communicate with his wife and three children. As a result, As I Lay Dying's mid-2013 tour with Killswitch Engage was cancelled.

On February 25, 2014, Lambesis changed his plea from "not guilty" to "guilty" and was sentenced to six years in prison on May 16, 2014, and credited with 48 days for time served.

While under house arrest, Lambesis made a lengthy post on his personal blog in which he stated that, due to the ongoing criminal case, he was no longer a Christian. In June 2014, Lambesis said he was an atheist, claiming that he, along with other members of the band, just kept pretending to be Christian just to sell records, a claim called slanderous and defamatory by then guitarist Nick Hipa. He even recalls feeling awkward when asked for their testimonies and when fans ask to pray with them. According to Lambesis, his renunciation of Christianity made it easier to have an affair. However, since his arrest, the band has released a statement that Lambesis "considers himself a follower of Jesus, someone submitted to the will of God, or whatever you want to call it".

In 2016, after two years in prison, Lambesis filed a lawsuit against two Southern California detention centers, Vista Detention Facility and George Bailey Detention Facility, for gross negligence in denying his request for anastrozole, a drug he had been prescribed to fight the side effects of withdrawal from steroids. The lawsuit alleges that as a result of the failure to provide him with the drug, Lambesis developed breasts and underwent severe emotional distress. His request for punitive damages of $35 million was dismissed in September 2016, but his claims of medical negligence have yet to be tried.

=== Life after prison ===
He was released on parole on December 17, 2016. He married Amanda Dubord in April 2017. They divorced in 2020, after which Lambesis married Danielle Norris (Dany Ciara) in 2022.

In December 2020, Lambesis said that he had accidentally spilled gasoline on himself while trying to add it to a bonfire. He suffered burns over 25 percent of his body and was hospitalized.

In late 2024, Lambesis and Norris divorced. Following this, numerous videos began circulating on the internet showing Lambesis being verbally abusive towards Norris, flipping tables and punching himself in the head and chest repeatedly. Lambesis then released a statement alleging that he had filed a restraining order against Norris due to her ongoing physical and mental abuse of him. In January 2025, Norris shared a statement on her social media pages countering that the opposite was true and alleging that Lambesis was mentally unstable and hiding behind his PR team to control the narrative of his pattern of abuse.

Following this, in January 2025, a leaked video appeared to show Lambesis striking a dog with his foot. In April 2025, a petition with roughly 70,000 signatures began circulating due to this incident with the goal of having California authorities open an investigation into Lambesis' alleged animal abuse.

In April 2025, former As I Lay Dying and Unearth guitarist Ken Susi revealed on a podcast that the exodus of the entire 2024 lineup of As I Lay Dying stemmed from an incident where Lambesis abused Norris in the kitchen of Susi's home, which was captured on security video and subsequently brought to the rest of the band's attention, causing the entire band—including longtime member Phil Sgrosso—to leave.

== Discography ==
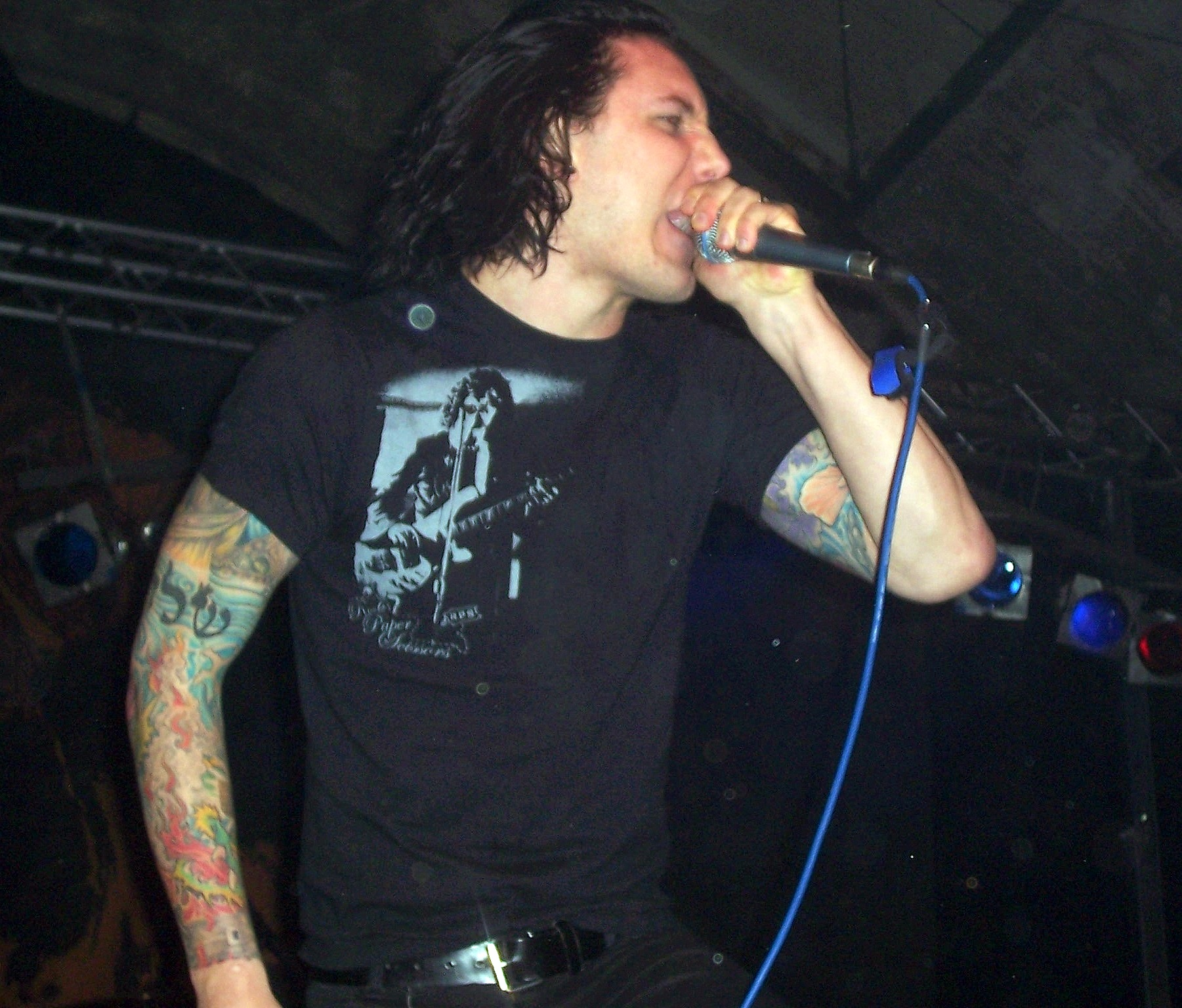
Lambesis in 2005

With As I Lay Dying

- Beneath the Encasing of Ashes (2001)
- Frail Words Collapse (2003)
- Shadows Are Security (2005)
- A Long March: The First Recordings (compilation, 2006)
- An Ocean Between Us (2007)
- The Powerless Rise (2010)
- Decas (compilation, 2011)
- Awakened (2012)
- Shaped by Fire (2019)
- Through Storms Ahead (2024)

As/with Austrian Death Machine

- Total Brutal (2008)
- A Very Brutal Christmas (EP, 2008)
- Double Brutal (2009)
- Jingle All the Way (EP, 2011)
- Triple Brutal (2014)
- Quad Brutal (2024)

As/with Pyrithion

- The Burden of Sorrow (EP, 2013)

With Born Through Fire

- Purify and Refine (2023)

=== Guest appearances ===
- "To the Nines", from The Fall of Rome (2005) – by Winter Solstice
- "After the Fall", from The Beginning of the End (2006) – by Sworn Enemy
- "Declaration", from Declaration (2008) – by Bleeding Through
- "God Rocky, Is This Your Face?", from Almost Home (2009) – by Evergreen Terrace
- "Orphans", from There Will Be Violence (2010) – by Impending Doom
- "Desire", from Eternal (2010) – by War of Ages
- "Constance", from Dead Throne (2011) – by The Devil Wears Prada
- "With a Resounding Voice", from Jasta (2011) – by Jamey Jasta
- "Wake Up", from Ending Is the Beginning: The Mitch Lucker Memorial Show (2014) – by Suicide Silence
- "Oblivion", from Oblivion (2021) – by Ov Sulfur

== Production discography ==
Year	Artist(s)	Album	Role
2001	As I Lay Dying	Beneath the Encasing of Ashes	Producer, vocals, lyrics, writer
2003	As I Lay Dying	Frail Words Collapse	Producer, vocals, lyrics, writer
2005	As I Lay Dying	Shadows Are Security	Producer, vocals, lyrics, writer
2006	Sworn Enemy	The Beginning of the End	Producer, vocals (track 9), writer
2006	As I Lay Dying	A Long March: The First Recordings	Producer (tracks 1–5), vocals, lyrics, writer
2006	Destroy the Runner	Saints	Producer (additional)
2007	War of Ages	Fire from the Tomb	Producer
2007	As I Lay Dying	An Ocean Between Us	Producer, vocals, lyrics, writer
2007	Sworn Enemy	Maniacal	Producer, writer
2008	The Human Abstract	Midheaven Sampler (EP)	Remixing (track 3)
2008	Austrian Death Machine	Total Brutal	Producer, vocals, guitar, bass, drums, keyboards, trumpet (track 6), lyrics, writer
2008	War of Ages	Arise and Conquer	Producer, engineer (additional), recording
2008	Austrian Death Machine	A Very Brutal Christmas (EP)	Producer, vocals, guitar, bass, drums (tracks 1 and 2), writer (tracks 1 and 2)
2009	Underneath the Gun	Forfeit Misfortunes	Producer, vocal producer
2009	Impending Doom	The Serpent Servant	Co-producer (assistant)
2009	Zao	Awake?	Producer
2009	Molotov Solution	The Harbinger	Recording
2009	Sworn Enemy	Total World Domination	Producer, writer
2009	Destruction of a Rose	Suspended in Time (EP)	Producer, mixing
2009	Austrian Death Machine	Double Brutal	Producer, mixing, vocals, guitar, bass, drums (track 2, 3, 5, 6, 8, 9, 11–13), keyboards, trumpet, oboe (track 5), lyrics, writer (tracks 1–13)
2010	Chelsea Grin	Desolation of Eden	Producer
2010	War of Ages	Eternal	Producer, vocals (track 2)
2010	Impending Doom	There Will Be Violence	Producer (vocals), vocals (track 3)
2010	Sea of Treachery	Wonderland	
2011	Carnifex	Until I Feel Nothing	Producer
2011	As I Lay Dying	Decas (Compilation)	Engineer (additional) (tracks 2–8), recording, vocals, lyrics, writer (tracks 1–3, 8)
2011	Austrian Death Machine	Jingle All the Way (EP)	Co-producer, vocals, lead guitar, writer
2019	Wolves at the Gate	Eclipse	Producer (additional), engineer, recording
2019	As I Lay Dying	Shaped by Fire	Engineer (vocals), recording, lead vocals, lyrics, writer
2023	Born Through Fire	Purify and Refine	Engineer, lead vocals, guitar, lyrics, writer
2024	Austrian Death Machine	Quad Brutal	Producer, engineer, recording, mixing, vocals, rhythm guitar, bass, lyrics, writer
2024	As I Lay Dying	Through Storms Ahead	Engineer, recording, vocals, lyrics, writer (tracks 2–11)

=== Lambesis Studios discography ===
Year	Artist(s)	Album	Role
2007	As I Lay Dying	An Ocean Between Us	Produced, recorded (vocals, guitars and bass)
2007	Sworn Enemy	Maniacal	Recorded (vocals), mixed
2008	Austrian Death Machine	Total Brutal	Recorded
2008	War of Ages	Arise and Conquer	Recorded (vocals, guitars and bass)
2008	Austrian Death Machine	A Very Brutal Christmas (EP)	Recorded
2009	Beyond the Shore	The Arctic Front (EP)	Recorded
2009	Impending Doom	The Serpent Servant	Produced, engineered, recorded, mixed
2009	As I Lay Dying	This Is Who We Are	Mixed
2009	Molotov Solution	The Harbinger	Recorded, mixed
2009	Sworn Enemy	Total World Domination	Recorded
2009	Destruction of a Rose	Suspended in Time (EP)	Recorded
2009	Thieves & Liars	American Rock 'N' Roll	Recorded
2009	Austrian Death Machine	Double Brutal	Recorded, mixed
2010	Chelsea Grin	Desolation of Eden	Recorded
2010	War of Ages	Eternal	Recorded
2010	As I Lay Dying	The Powerless Rise	Recorded (vocals, guitars and bass), mixed
2010	Impending Doom	There Will Be Violence	Produced, engineered, mixed
2010	Destruction of a Rose	American Hell	Recorded
2010	Sea of Treachery	Wonderland	Engineered, recorded
2010	The Bridal Procession	Astronomical Dimensions	Mixed
2011	Life or Death	Abomination	Mixed
2011	DevilDriver	Beast	Recorded (vocals)
2011	Across the Sun	Before the Night Takes Us	Engineered, mastered
2011	Unwritten Law	Swan	Recorded
2011	Trivium	Live from Chapman Studios	Mixed
2011	Pathology	Awaken to the Suffering	Recorded, mixed
2011	Carnifex	Until I Feel Nothing	Recorded
2011	As I Lay Dying	Decas (Compilation)	Recorded (vocals, guitars and bass), mixed (1, 2, 4–8) and mastered (9–12)
2011	Karma Violens	Dormancy	Mixed and mastered
2012	Wykked Wytch	The Ultimate Deception	Recorded
2012	Allegaeon	Formshifter	Recorded
2012	Darkness Divided	Chronicles (EP)	Recorded, mixed and mastered
2012	Glass Cloud	The Royal Thousand	Produced
2012	As I Lay Dying	Awakened	Recorded (vocals and bass)
2012	The Fallen Within	The Day You Died Inside	Mixed and mastered
2012	No Bragging Rights	Cycles	Engineered
2013	Pyrithion	The Burden of Sorrow (EP)	Recorded, mixed
2014	W.E.B.	For Bidens	Mixed and mastered
2014	Confession	Life and Death	
2014	Dreambleed	Beautiful Sickness	Mastered
