= Shaped by Fire =

Studio album by As I Lay Dying
- Released: September 20, 2019
- Recorded: 2018–2019
- Studios: Signature Sound, Los Angeles
- Genre: Metalcore
- Length: 44:05
- Label: Nuclear Blast
- Producer: As I Lay Dying

As I Lay Dying chronology
Awakened (2012)	Shaped by Fire (2019)	Through Storms Ahead (2024)

Singles from Shaped by Fire
- 1. "My Own Grave" Released: June 8, 2018; 2. "Redefined" Released: April 12, 2019; 3. "Shaped by Fire" Released: August 9, 2019; 4. "Blinded" Released: September 13, 2019

Shaped by Fire is the seventh studio album by American metalcore band As I Lay Dying. It was released on September 20, 2019, through Nuclear Blast. The album was produced by the band themselves and is the follow-up to the group's sixth album, Awakened (2012). It is the first album in seven years after the band went on hiatus in 2014 when Tim Lambesis was incarcerated and sentenced to six years in prison for soliciting the murder of his estranged wife. It is also the last album to feature lead guitarist Nick Hipa, who left the band in 2020, and drummer Jordan Mancino and bassist/clean vocalist Josh Gilbert, both of whom left the band in 2022.

On October 25, 2024, Shaped by Fire got pulled off all streaming sources Apple Music, Spotify, YouTube, Amazon Music, and Tidal, among others. The band subsequently stated that it would only be temporary, as the rights to the album have reverted to them. The album was restored in those sites a week after its removal.

== Background and promotion ==
After Lambesis was released from prison on probation in December 2016 for attempting to hire a contract killer to murder his ex-wife, he began reaching out to the other members of the band looking to apologize in person starting with Mancino and Gilbert. After that he attempted to reconnect with Sgrosso and Hipa and eventually all four of them forgave him.

On June 8, 2018, the band released the music video for "My Own Grave". On April 12, 2019, the band released a music video for "Redefined", including a guest appearance by August Burns Red frontman Jake Luhrs. Two days later, the band announced the "Shaped by Fire" tour of Europe with support from Chelsea Grin, Unearth and Fit for a King running from September 2019 and concluding in October. On July 15, the band announced the North American dates of the "Shaped by Fire" Tour with direct support from After the Burial and Emmure to begin on November 15 at the House of Blues in Las Vegas and conclude on December 14 with a hometown show at the Soma San Diego. Details of the album, Shaped by Fire, were leaked through Nuclear Blast's European website with a projected release date. On August 9, the band officially announced their album, Shaped by Fire, would be released through Nuclear Blast, along with releasing the album's title track. On September 13, the band released "Blinded" as the album's fourth single along with an accompanying music video.

In March 2020, as a way of supporting their crew during the COVID-19 pandemic, they released an additional song, "Destruction or Strength", a B-side from this album's sessions. Two months later, in May, a music video for the song "Torn Between" was released.

In December of 2021, a deluxe edition of the album was released featuring live and instrumental versions of songs as well as re-interpretations of the original tracks.

== Reception ==
Professional ratings
Review scores
Source	Rating
Ultimate Guitar	8/10
Metal Temple Magazine	10/10
Metal.de	7/10

Due to the past controversies surrounding the band, many media outlets did not review the album; however, the ones that did gave it mostly positive reviews. German reviewer Metal.de wrote "if you temper the expectations stemming from their past and their reunion, AS I LAY DYING have certainly achieved one thing: they have delivered a worthwhile metalcore album that offers everything fans know and love about the band." travislausch of Ultimate Guitar added "Shaped by Fire" is still a very solid album with strong riffs and good hooks, and for those who have forgiven Lambesis, is well worth a listen, and worth the wait since 2012's "Awakened."

Loudwire named it one of the 50 best metal albums of 2019.

Commercially the album sold 12,000 copies in its first week in the US with 9,200 of them being pure album sales. It debuted at number 50 on the Billboard 200, and also reached the top 10 in the mainstream charts in both Germany and Austria.

== Track listing ==
No.	Title	Length
1.	"Burn to Emerge"	0:52
2.	"Blinded"	3:22
3.	"Shaped by Fire"	3:39
4.	"Undertow"	3:57
5.	"Torn Between"	4:01
6.	"Gatekeeper"	3:25
7.	"The Wreckage"	4:43
8.	"My Own Grave"	4:13
9.	"Take What's Left"	4:13
10.	"Redefined" (featuring Jake Luhrs of August Burns Red)	4:15
11.	"Only After We've Fallen"	3:29
12.	"The Toll It Takes"	3:56
Total length:		44:05

Deluxe Edition Bonus CD
No.	Title	Length
1.	"Re-Separation" (instrumental)	1:47
2.	"Roots Below"	3:35
3.	"Destruction or Strength"	4:15
4.	"My Own Grave" (re-interpretation)	4:00
5.	"Redefined" (re-interpretation)	3:28
6.	"Pre-Shaped by Fire" (live intro)	1:04
7.	"Euphony from Ashes" (live outro)	1:36
8.	"Blinded" (Live from Munich)	3:25
9.	"My Own Grave" (Live from Munich)	4:07
10.	"Burn to Emerge" (instrumental)	0:52
11.	"Blinded" (instrumental)	3:22
12.	"Shaped by Fire" (instrumental)	3:38
13.	"Undertow" (instrumental)	3:57
14.	"Torn Between" (instrumental)	4:30
15.	"Gatekeeper" (instrumental)	3:26
16.	"The Wreckage" (instrumental)	4:42
17.	"My Own Grave" (instrumental)	4:14
18.	"Take What's Left" (instrumental)	4:13
19.	"Redefined" (instrumental)	4:14
20.	"Only After We've Fallen" (instrumental)	3:27
21.	"The Toll It Takes" (instrumental)	3:53
Total length:		71:58

== Personnel ==
Credits retrieved from AllMusic.

As I Lay Dying

- Tim Lambesis – lead vocals, vocal engineering
- Nick Hipa – guitar, backing vocals, guitar engineering
- Phil Sgrosso – guitar, backing vocals, guitar engineering
- Josh Gilbert – bass, clean vocals, bass engineering, mixing assistance
- Jordan Mancino – drums

Additional musicians

- Jake Luhrs – additional vocals on track 10
- Dominic Estes, Andrew Perez and Kevin Rowe – background vocals

Additional personnel

- As I Lay Dying – production, composition
- Drew Fulk – co-production (track 8 only)
- Adam Dutkiewicz – additional production, drum engineering
- Christian Cummings and Eoghan Ryan – assisting engineering
- Joseph McQueen – mixing, bass engineering, drum engineering, vocal engineering, percussion
- Adam "Nolly" Getgood – mixing (track 8 only)
- Ted Jensen – mastering
- Corey Meyers – artwork, layout

== Charts ==
Chart (2019)	Peak position
Australian Albums (ARIA)	27
Austrian Albums (Ö3 Austria)	9
Belgian Albums (Ultratop Flanders)	111
Belgian Albums (Ultratop Wallonia)	92
Canadian Albums (Billboard)	28
German Albums (Offizielle Top 100)	6
Japanese Albums (Oricon)	116
Scottish Albums (Official Charts)	32
Spanish Albums (PROMUSICAE)	72
Swiss Albums (Schweizer Hitparade)	15
UK Independent Albums (Official Charts)	14
UK Rock & Metal Albums (Official Charts)	4
US Billboard 200	50
US Independent Albums (Billboard)	5
US Indie Store Album Sales (Billboard)	8
US Top Hard Rock Albums (Billboard)	3
US Top Rock Albums (Billboard)	7
