= This Is Who We Are (As I Lay Dying album) =

Video by As I Lay Dying
- Released: April 14, 2009
- Genre: Metalcore
- Length: 300 minutes (approx)
- Label: Metal Blade
- Director: Denise Korycki
- Producer: Denise Korycki (Wild Wind Productions)

As I Lay Dying chronology
An Ocean Between Us (2007)	This Is Who We Are (2009)	The Powerless Rise (2010)

Professional ratings
Review scores
Source	Rating
Allmusic	link
Exclaim!	Unfavorable link
HM Magazine	3.5/5 link
Metal Hammer	Favorable link (in German)

This Is Who We Are is the first DVD by American metalcore band As I Lay Dying. It was released on April 14, 2009, through Metal Blade Records. The video album sold 4,200 copies in the US during its first week of sales allowing it to debut at number 2 on the Top Music Videos chart. On May 18, 2009, the DVD was certified Gold in the US by the RIAA. It was also certified Platinum in Canada by Music Canada.

== Track listing ==
=== Disc 1: Documentary ===
Complete band history includes in-depth artist interviews and commentary, interviews with friends and family, as well as observations and road stories from colleagues and bands that have worked with and befriended As I Lay Dying since the band's inception.

=== Disc 2: Live ===
Videos of live songs recorded from various locations during As I Lay Dying's 2008 tours.

1. "Falling Upon Deaf Ears" (Seacoast Community Church)
2. "Forever" (Seacoast Community Church)
3. "Meaning In Tragedy" (The Jumping Turtle)
4. "The Darkest Nights" (The Jumping Turtle)
5. "Separation" (The Grove of Anaheim)
6. "Nothing Left" (The Grove of Anaheim)
7. "An Ocean Between Us" (The Grove of Anaheim)
8. "Within Destruction" (The Grove of Anaheim)
9. "Forsaken" (The Grove of Anaheim)
10. "Distance Is Darkness" (The Grove of Anaheim)
11. "I Never Wanted" (The Grove of Anaheim)
12. "The Sound of Truth" (The Grove of Anaheim)
13. "94 Hours" (Cornerstone)
14. "Through Struggle" (Wacken Open Air)
15. "Reflection" (With Full Force Festival)
16. "Confined" (Wacken Open Air)

=== Disc 3: Music videos and bonus features ===
Music videos, additional live songs, touring stories, profiles on personalities & more.

Music videos

1. "Nothing Left" (directed by Brian Thompson)
2. "The Sound of Truth" (directed by Brian Thompson)
3. "Within Destruction" (directed by Jerry Clubb)
4. "Confined" (directed by Christopher Sims)
5. "Through Struggle" (directed by Lex Halaby)
6. "The Darkest Nights" (directed by Darren Doane)
7. "Forever" (directed by Derek Dale)
8. "94 Hours" (directed by Derek Dale)

Extra live performances

1. "Elegy" (Seacoast Community Church)
2. "Empty Hearts" (The Jumping Turtle)

== Personnel ==
- Tim Lambesis – lead vocals
- Jordan Mancino – drums
- Nick Hipa – lead guitar, backing vocals
- Phillip Sgrosso – rhythm guitar, keyboards, backing vocals
- Josh Gilbert – bass, clean vocals
- Clint Norris – formerly bass, clean vocals
- Produced and directed by Denise Korycki
- Brian J. Ames
- Vince Edwards
- Dan Fitzgerald
- Kelli Malella
- Heather Parsons
- Brian Slagel – owner of Metal Blade Records
- Mike Faley
- Tracy Vera
- Kenny Gabor – manager
- Vaughn Lewis – manager
- Dave Miller
- Lia Starace
- Jim Starace
- Brian Cobbel – owner of Pluto Records
- Tommy Garcia – former guitarist/bassist
- Brandon Hays – former bassist/guitarist
- Kevin Puig – tour manager

AILD Crew

- Joey Bradford
- Andrew "Dayday" Perez
- Kyle Rosa
- Brandon Ward
- Joe Aguilar
- Brandon Peterson
- Jason Mancino

== Certifications ==
Region	Certification	Certified units/sales
Canada (Music Canada)	Platinum	10,000^{^}
United States (RIAA)	Gold	50,000^{^}
^{^} Shipments figures based on certification alone.
