= The Powerless Rise =

Studio album by As I Lay Dying
- Released: May 7, 2010
- Recorded: October 2009 – February 2010
- Studio: Lambesis Studio, San Diego, CA
- Genre: Melodic metalcore; thrash metal
- Length: 44:08
- Label: Metal Blade
- Producer: Adam Dutkiewicz; As I Lay Dying

As I Lay Dying chronology
This Is Who We Are (2009)	The Powerless Rise (2010)	Decas (2011)

Singles from The Powerless Rise
- 1. "Beyond Our Suffering" Released: April 5, 2010; 2. "Parallels" Released: April 28, 2010; 3. "Anodyne Sea" Released: January 19, 2011

The Powerless Rise is the fifth studio album by American metalcore band As I Lay Dying. The album was released on May 7, 2010, in Europe, and on May 11, 2010, in the United States. The Powerless Rise debuted at No. 10 on the Billboard 200 with sales of 38,000. The album features three singles: "Beyond Our Suffering", "Parallels", and "Anodyne Sea", with music videos being released for all three.

== Background ==
As I Lay Dying began writing songs for The Powerless Rise in mid-2009 following two years of touring for the band's 2007 album An Ocean Between Us. In early September the band shared that they had "been home hard at work writing new songs for an album that will be out in early-2010." By the end of September, the group had finished "about 6-7" songs and was scheduled to enter the studio on October 17, 2009, where they would continue to write new songs. This is in contrast to previous albums by As I Lay Dying that had been written over the course of only a few months. The three years between the release of An Ocean Between Us and The Powerless Rise previously was the largest gap between releases from the band at that time. Frontman Tim Lambesis stated that while some bands "need to rush out a crappy record so they can start touring again to pay their bills," As I Lay Dying had been working hard to "make a record worth listening to (hopefully), and start touring again when we're done."

The band officially announced the title of the album in February 2010. In March 2010, the album artwork for the record, again provided by Jacob Bannon, was shared by MetalBlade Records.

The band presented the album in a number of different pre-order bundles, including a CD plus an autographed booklet and a t-shirt, and also a deluxe fan box which allowed fans to receive the album prior to its official release.

On April 8 the band played the song "Beyond Our Suffering" live for the first time, at the 2010 Revolver Golden Gods Music Awards.

On May 7 the band made the entirety of the album temporarily available for streaming on their MySpace profile.

Several music videos were produced for songs on the album. The band debuted a video for the track "Parallels" July 11, 2010. The video was directed by Dave Brodsky. A music video for the song "Anodyne Sea," directed by Ian McFarland and Mike Pecci, was released in January 2011. A live music video for the track "Beyond Our Suffering" was released in May 2011. The video was filmed by the band's friend Joe Hamming on July 14, 2010, in Orlando, Florida while the band was on the "Cool Tour."

The Powerless Rise was produced by Killswitch Engage lead guitarist Adam Dutkiewicz and Daniel Castelman, and was mixed by Colin Richardson and Martyn Ford. Adam Dutkiewicz also produced As I Lay Dying's An Ocean Between Us. According to guitarist Phil Sgrosso, Dutkiewicz was chosen over ten other producers the band had talked with after "realizing that Adam understands our sound better than most." Castelman and Richardson were also audio engineers on An Ocean Between Us.

The album's first single "Beyond Our Suffering" was made available for fans to play and download for free in the game "Tap Tap Revenge 3."

== Reception ==
Professional ratings
Aggregate scores
Source	Rating
Metacritic	81/100
Review scores
Source	Rating
About.com	4/5 stars
AbsolutePunk	88%
Allmusic	4/5 stars
Blabbermouth.net	8/10 stars
Cross Rhythms	8/10 stars
Exclaim!	"most accomplished record yet"
Jesus Freak Hideout	4/5 stars
PopMatters	6/10 stars
Rock Sound	7/10 stars
Sputnikmusic	4/5 stars

The Powerless Rise was released in May 2010 to generally positive acclaim. It currently holds "universal acclaim" status for generally good reviews on Metacritic with an 81 out of 100.

== Track listing ==
All lyrics are written by Tim Lambesis; all music is composed by As I Lay Dying.

No.	Title	Length
1.	"Beyond Our Suffering"	2:50
2.	"Anodyne Sea"	4:35
3.	"Without Conclusion"	3:15
4.	"Parallels"	4:57
5.	"The Plague"	3:42
6.	"Anger and Apathy"	4:26
7.	"Condemned"	2:50
8.	"Upside Down Kingdom"	4:00
9.	"Vacancy"	4:27
10.	"The Only Constant Is Change"	4:08
11.	"The Blinding of False Light"	5:05
Total length:		44:08

iTunes bonus track
No.	Title	Length
12.	"Condemned" (Gunfight Mix [Pre-Order Only])	3:56

== Personnel ==
Production and performance credits are adapted from the album liner notes.

As I Lay Dying

- Tim Lambesis – unclean vocals
- Nick Hipa – guitar, backing vocals
- Phil Sgrosso – guitar, backing vocals
- Josh Gilbert – bass, clean vocals
- Jordan Mancino – drums

Production

- Adam Dutkiewicz – production, engineering
- Daniel Castleman – engineering, pre-production
- Joseph McQueen – vocal engineering
- Colin Richardson – mixing
- Martyn "Ginge" Ford – mix engineering
- Ted Jensen – mastering
- Kelly Cairns – pre-production
- Joey St. Lucas – guitar tech
- Mike Catalano – drum tech, additional percussion
- Jacob Bannon – artwork, design

== Charts ==
Chart (2010)	Peak position
Australian Albums (ARIA Charts)	53
Austrian Albums (Ö3 Austria)	21
Canadian Albums (Billboard)	11
German Albums (Offizielle Top 100)	22
Japanese Albums (Oricon)	69
Swiss Albums (Schweizer Hitparade)	39
UK Albums (OCC)	172
UK Independent Albums (OCC)	19
UK Rock & Metal Albums (OCC)	14
US Billboard 200	10
US Digital Albums (Billboard)	5
US Independent Albums (Billboard)	2
US Top Hard Rock Albums (Billboard)	3
US Top Rock Albums (Billboard)	5
US Indie Store Album Sales (Billboard)	5
