= Phil Sgrosso =

American guitarist (born 1985)

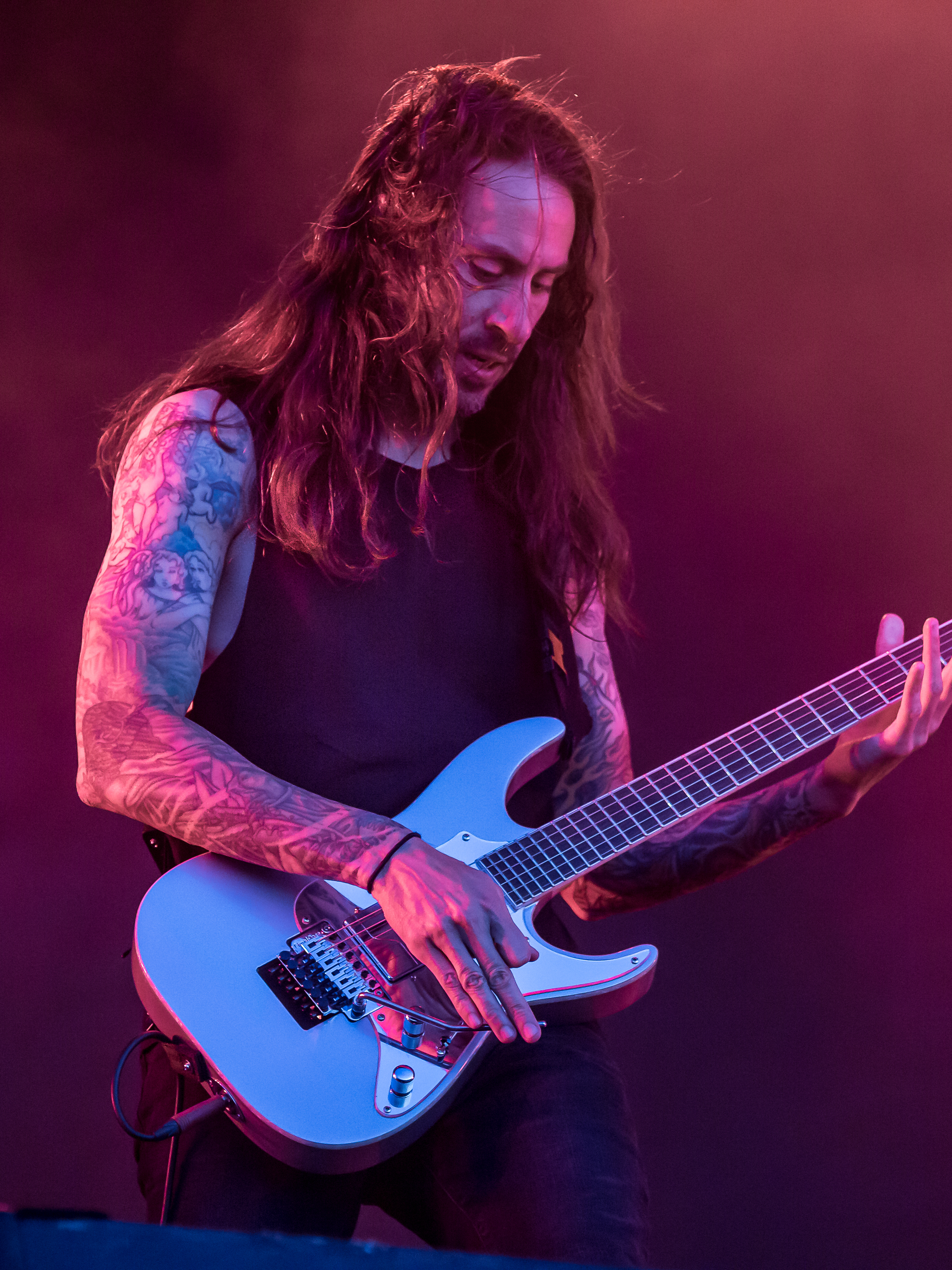
- Sgrosso performing with As I Lay Dying in 2023

Background information
- Born: Philip Joseph Sgrosso; September 16, 1985 (age 40); Mission Viejo, California, U.S.
- Origin: San Diego, California, U.S.
- Genres: Metalcore; melodic metalcore; thrash metal; hardcore punk; alternative rock; alternative metal; post-hardcore
- Occupation: Musician
- Instrument: Guitar
- Years active: 2003–present
- Member of: Saosin, Poison Headache, Apathian
- Formerly of: As I Lay Dying, Wovenwar

Philip Joseph Sgrosso (born September 16, 1985) is an American musician, best known as former guitarist of the metalcore band As I Lay Dying, the rhythm guitarist of the band Wovenwar, former touring guitarist for Nails, and the current lead guitarist for Saosin.

== Career ==
Before joining the band that jumpstarted his musical career, Sgrosso was a part of a local act known as Tomra, a melodic metalcore band from San Diego, which disbanded in 2003. Joining As I Lay Dying at the age of 17, Sgrosso had honed his creative talents as one of the songwriters on 2005's Shadows Are Security. His work with the band extends from solely instrumentation, with producing credits on the bands latter releases.

Throughout his tenure with As I Lay Dying, the band was named "Artist of the Year" at the San Diego Music Awards in 2005, 2007, and 2008, and was nominated for a Grammy Award for the song "Nothing Left" in 2008. Sgrosso received the "Ultimate Metal God" award from MTV2 in 2007. Through six studio albums and one split release, As I Lay Dying sold more than 1,000,000 albums worldwide, with their DVD, This Is Who We Are, being Certified Gold within one month of its release. As I Lay Dying's sixth album, Awakened, was released on September 25, 2012, to high critical acclaim.

Following the incarceration of As I Lay Dying vocalist Tim Lambesis in 2013, the remaining members of the band formed Wovenwar with Oh, Sleeper guitarist Shane Blay. They released their debut album, Wovenwar, in 2014 via Metal Blade Records. As I Lay Dying reunited in June 2018.

While touring on the Mayhem Festival in 2012, Sgrosso pulled double-duty performing with As I Lay Dying and Slipknot, filling in for Jim Root on the first leg of the run. Beginning in 2016, he became a permanent fixture to Saosin's touring lineup, taking over after Justin Shekoski's departure. Sgrosso is also a touring guitar player for American powerviolence band Nails. Sgrosso also has a band called Poison Headache with him playing guitars, bass, and vocals, Andy Kutka (formerly of Internal Affairs) on vocals and guitar and Kyle Rosa (formerly of Thieves and Liars) on drums and they are signed to Metal Blade Records.

On October 30, 2024, Following the departures of three bandmates, Sgrosso announced his departure from As I Lay Dying, citing that the band "no longer offers a healthy or safe environment for anyone involved". He was the last remaining longterm member of the band.

== Discography ==
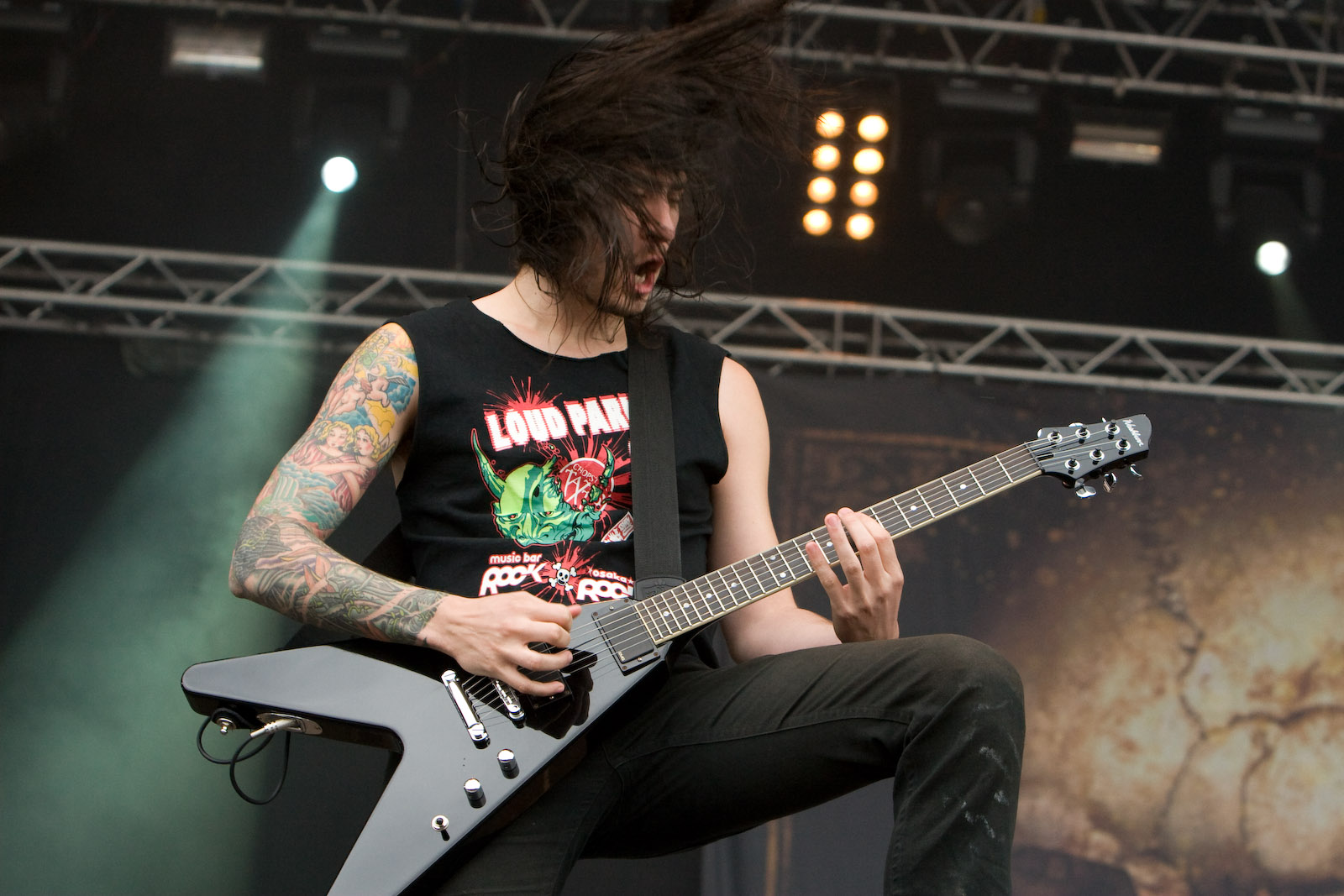
Phil Sgrosso performing with As I Lay Dying at With Full Force in 2007

As I Lay Dying

- Shadows Are Security (2005)
- A Long March: The First Recordings (compilation, 2006)
- An Ocean Between Us (2007)
- The Powerless Rise (2010)
- Decas (compilation, 2011)
- Awakened (2012)
- Shaped by Fire (2019)
- Through Storms Ahead (2024)

Wovenwar

- Wovenwar (2014)
- Honor Is Dead (2016)

Poison Headache

- Poison Headache (2016)

Author & Punisher

- Krüller (2022) (session guitar)

Saosin

- "Starting Over Again" (2026)
