= Ugly/Heartless =

2006 studio album by The Jonbenét

Studio album by the Jonbenét
- Released: August 8, 2006
- Studio: Johnny Killed Rock N’ Roll Studios (Houston, Texas)
- Genres: Post-hardcore; noise rock
- Length: 45:02
- Label: Pluto

The Jonbenét chronology
The Plot Thickens (2005)	Ugly/Heartless (2006)	Devil Music Volume 1 (2007)

Ugly/Heartless is the debut studio album by American noise rock band the Jonbenét, released on August 26, 2005, via Pluto Records. The title was given as a result of a poll from the band's LiveJournal.

The band produced a music video for "Why We're Dead" in fall 2006. "Devils" appeared in the band's 7" vinyl series Devil Music Volume 1 in April 2007.

== Background and recording ==
The debut was being worked on during The Plot Thickens, they finished writing their debut full-length in December 2005 and after the success of the compilation album, they started recording in January. Later, they announced that it will be called Ugly/Heartless and was scheduled to release on April 25. Immediately after recording, the band left for a tour with The Fall of Troy, With All Sincerity and At All Cost. Due to unforeseen circumstances, the album was pushed back to June. The album had run into another delay and was rescheduled to August 8.

The band did an interview with Deaf Sparrow, where they talk about the band's history and the recording and writing process of their album. On that interview, they talk about the writing process, they said "we approached it as relaxed as we could have. 95% of all the material came from us just getting in the room and jamming." They mention that The Plot Thickens was different compared to the debut album, "The Plot Thickens for us sits in an entirely different realm from Ugly/Heartless, seeing as how it’s two separate releases put together, with some songs being 4 or more years old at the time of its release. We had all grown as artists and as people, and wanted to create more of an entity with this album. The whole idea behind Ugly/Heartless was to be as real as we can and keep it raw and avoid overproduction as much as possible. It felt more real." When it comes to recording, they informed that it "was recorded live in a bar during closed hours in downtown Houston. 5 out of the 12 tracks on the album are the first take. I believe they are tracks 2, 3, 7, 9, and 11." They were really worried with the sound and process, they go further saying that "the whole process was a big leap of faith. Both releases that comprise The Plot Thickens were recorded by tracking with a click track. That method is important sometimes, but we felt a stronger need to make more of a statement with our debut."

== Reception ==
Professional ratings
Review scores
Source	Rating
AllMusic	4/5 stars
CMJ	Positive
Decibel Magazine	Positive
Houston Press	Positive
Lollipop Magazine	Positive
Punknews.org	3/5 stars
Scene Point Blank	4/5 stars
Spin	Positive
The Stranger	Positive

The album was met with positive reviews, The Stranger was very impressed "the Jonbenét cut Ugly/Heartless live, loud, and loose in a Houston bar/recording studio, demonstrating their chops by nailing half of the songs on the first take; even though they reveal slightly more melody than was heard on their previous EPs (all of which are collected on 2005's The Plot Thickens), the band's trademark spastic, angular wall of posthardcore noise ensures that things never get too melodious." Spin gave the album a positive review, stating "Murland screeches and wails through a thrashing set of tunes that will get you banging your head, spitting beer, and putting the pedal to the floor — even if you’re usually the headphones-and-a-mug-of-tea type. Under the ugliness/heartlessness, however, is a level of musicianship (mostly on the part of guitarist Miller) that pushes Ugly/Heartless closer to beauty."

Decibel Magazine was pleased, they that their music is "grounding their spastic, time-twisting shriekfests with gloomy metal guitar riffs." Houston Press also gave a positive outlook to the album "with their wailing lyrics, toe-tapping drum cadences and slick guitar harmonies, it's easy to see the Southern rock, post-hardcore and Black Sabbath influences of this fearsome foursome (Michael Murland on vocals, Daniel Miller on guitar, William Spent on bass and J. Andrew Ireland on drums)."

CMJ was positive, they also notice that "Ugly/Heartless comes commendably close to picking up the Blood Brother' baton and masterminding searing post-hardcore." Justin of Scene Point Blank was happy with the effort, they described it as "is an interesting take on the world with twelve songs spread out to about a total of a forty-five minute runtime that blend the thin lines of southern rock and the intentions of screamo, and of course the enchanting spirit of rocking the f*ck out." Brian Shultz of Punknews.org was mixed, to them, the album was overall "a bit of a clusterf*ck and tends to be white noisy rather than noisy at times, but it's still thankful the band is trying to escape their pigeonhole and usually succeeding." Greg Prato of AllMusic was positive, they wrote that "The Jonbenet have a knack for sounding like a herd of sto5mping gorillas armed with rock instruments, especially on such standouts as the album-opening "Devils" and "We Eat Our Young." Lollipop Magazine was also positive, they said that "the first two tracks, “Devils” and “Eating Lighting Pt. II,” somehow manage to find their way through complicated mazes and hectic changes to a coherent goal." Deaf Sparrow gave a positive post, they mention the band "know how to leave the listener craving for more; it is not so much about satisfying a need, as much as it is about quenching it for a while only to make you crave it more when it’s taken away." Neufutur Magazine gave a 7.3/10 rating, they informed that the songs "have breakdowns that are impressive in their breaking down of time signatures and the expectations that individuals have for the band."

== Track listing ==
All tracks are written by The Jonbenét.

No.	Title	Length
1.	"Devils"	2:55
2.	"Eating Lightning Pt. II"	3:39
3.	"We Eat Our Young"	1:40
4.	"Black Lion"	3:22
5.	"Love Is A Dog From Hell"	3:51
6.	"Why We're Dead"	3:12
7.	"Three Years"	3:31
8.	"It Fell To The Earth"	4:05
9.	"It Made Them Sick"	1:39
10.	"Zeppelin"	5:04
11.	"Damned"	3:29
12.	"Hearts In The Jar"	8:40
Total length:		45:02

== Personnel ==
The Jonbenét

- Michael Murland – Vocals
- Dann Miller – Guitar, photography and layout
- Wil Spent – Bass
- Drew Ireland – Drums

Technical Personnel

- Chris Ryan - Engineer and mixing
- Eric Faucette - Engineer and mixing
- Nolan Brett - Mastering
