= Desperate Living (album) =

Studio album by Horse the Band
- Released: October 6, 2009
- Recorded: March–May 2009
- Genres: Nintendocore, metalcore, electronic rock
- Length: 54:44
- Label: Vagrant
- Producer: Noah Shain

Horse the Band chronology
A Natural Death (2007)	Desperate Living (2009)	Your Fault (2020)

Singles from Desperate Living
- 1. "Shapeshift" Released: April 2009

Professional ratings
Review scores
Source	Rating
BBC.co.uk	(positive)
Drowned in Sound	7/10 stars
Rock Sound	8/10 stars

Desperate Living is the fourth studio album by Horse the Band, released October 6, 2009, through Vagrant Records.

== Overview ==
The album sees a departure from the band's reliance on the Nintendocore sound which predominantly defined their earlier records; instead, Desperate Living explores more experimental qualities. The bass guitar's role in the music (as well as in the band itself) has been diminished slightly, with the lower registers mainly serving as counters for the guitar and keyboard melodies instead of the rhythm section role of music of their style. The album is also unique in comparison with the band's previous work in that there is considerably more synthesized bass, orchestration, and drum programming featured.

Those who purchased the album through iTunes received remixes by the members of Horse the Band's favorite artists and members of the band itself under different identities.

The album reached No. 125 at Billboard 200 chart.

Jamie Stewart of the band Xiu Xiu appears on Desperate Living as per request from Erik Engstrom in an AIM message he sent to Stewart. Classical pianist Valentina Lisitsa is also featured on the song "Rape Escape", playing "a fragment of the cadenza of Prokofiev's Piano Concerto No. 2, the emotional climax and most technically demanding section of one of the most difficult pieces ever written for piano". According to Engstrom, "She plays like she is possessed by the song, like she is channeling the composer and understanding their intentions and feelings better than they understood them when they were writing the song." Engstrom was very satisfied with her inclusion on the album by also stating "Only a handful of pianists in the world could play the piece, and she embarasses (sic) every single one of them." It was reported that Lisitsa recorded the piano piece in her home studio and broke a string while recording it.

Stewart commented on their role in the recording process, stating, "Horse the band has asked me to try to help them make a dying robot, an exploding keyboard, a dream laugh, and a melted, drastic flute of redemption. Lucky for you and for me they have the wit and creativity to turn these things into music."

== Track listing ==
All lyrics are written by Nathan Winneke; all music is composed by Horse the Band.

No.	Title	Length
1.	"Cloudwalker"	4:50
2.	"Desperate Living"	4:07
3.	"The Failure of All Things"	4:51
4.	"Horse the Song" (featuring K-SLAX)	4:24
5.	"Science Police"	3:50
6.	"Shapeshift" (featuring Jamie Stewart)	5:11
7.	"Between the Trees"	3:55
8.	"Golden Mummy Golden Bird"	4:46
9.	"Lord Gold Wand of Unyielding" (featuring His Purple Majesty David Isen and Lord Gold Erik Engstrom)	2:32
10.	"Big Business"	4:56
11.	"Rape Escape" (featuring Valentina Lisitsa)	7:12
12.	"Arrive"	4:10
Total length:		54:44

Japan bonus track
No.	Title	Length
13.	"Shapeshift" (remix)	3:49
Total length:		58:33

Deluxe Edition bonus tracks
No.	Title	Length
13.	"Rape Escape vs. Dmndays"	3:23
14.	"Lord Gold Wand of Unyielding vs. Dan Sena"	4:46
15.	"The Failure of All Things vs. Airborne Drumz"	4:22
16.	"Arrive vs. Burgermover"	4:04
17.	"Horse the Song vs. Arottenbit" (8 Bit cover)	4:03
18.	"Arrive vs. :(" (Love Silent Things Remix)	3:26
19.	"The Failure of All Things vs. DJ Danny Maverick"	3:43
20.	"Science Police vs. Lazrtag"	4:12
21.	"Golden Mummy Golden Bird vs. Skrillex"	6:00
22.	"Caps"	1:06
Total length:		1:33:49

== Charts ==
Chart	Position
Billboard 200	125

== Personnel ==
Horse the Band

- Nathan Winneke – lead vocals
- David Isen – guitar, co-lead vocals on "Lord Gold Wand of Unyielding"
- Erik Engstrom – synthesizer, LSDJ, backing vocals, co-lead vocals on "Lord Gold Wand of Unyielding"
- Daniel Pouliot – drums

Guest musicians

- Brian Grover (of Thriller) – bass guitar
- Valentina Lisitsa – piano
- Jamie Stewart -vocals, sound design
- Ed Edge – triangle on "Big Business"
- Jon Karel – guest drums on "Desperate Living"
- Vernon Chatman- Conundrumming
- Gary LaChance- vocals
- Sarah Hamilton- vocals
- Mike Benitez- vocals
