= My America Is Watching Tigers Die =

American noise rock band

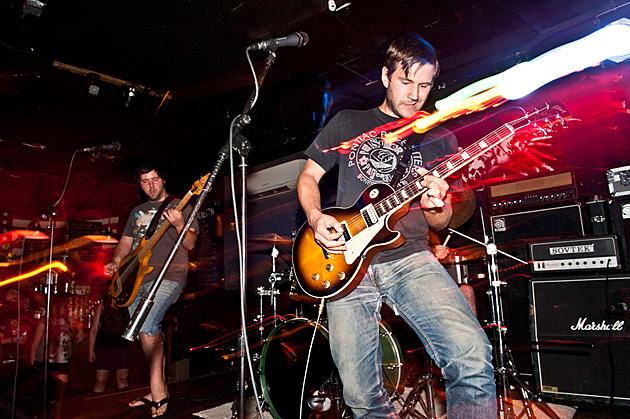
- My America performing at The Acheron in Brooklyn on August 5th, 2013. Left to Right: Brian Miller, Andrew Rapp, and Matthew Turner.

Background information
- Also known as: An April Setting Sun (2002–2004); My America (2009–2015)
- Origin: Newark, Delaware, U.S.
- Genres: Noise rock; grunge; thrash metal; post hardcore; hardcore punk
- Years active: 2002–2016
- Labels: Emerald Moon; Pluto; The Ghost Is Clear
- Past members: Mike MacMillan; Blair Allen; Will DiMondi; David Rushman; Matthew Turner; Brian Miller; Andrew Rapp
- Website: myamericanoise.com

My America Is Watching Tigers Die was an American noise rock band formed in Newark, Delaware, in 2002. The group consisted of: vocalist David Rushman, guitarist Matthew Turner, bassist Brian Miller, and drummer Andrew Rapp. They were influenced by Deadguy, Knut, The Jesus Lizard, Botch, and Coalesce. The band toured with acts such as: Coliseum, Sannhet, Keelhaul, KEN Mode, Rosetta, Engineer, North, Bezoar, Thera Roya, All Time Low, and Pharaoh to name a few.

They were originally called An April Setting Sun before changing their name in May 2004. The band signed to Emerald Moon Records and released their debut album Narratives (2006). After the release of Narratives, the band caught the eyes of Pluto Records, and signed with them for the release of their second album Stone Age (2008). Frontman David Rushman unexpectedly left the band in 2008, leading to a change in the sound and direction of the band. After the departure of Rushman, the band officially shortened their name to My America.

After Pluto Records became inactive, the band self-released Hurry Up & Chill (2010). The album attracted The Ghost Is Clear Records, who eventually signed them. They released their final album Misses (2016), before officially disbanding in late 2016.

== History ==
=== 2002–2004: Formation and early years ===
The Band was formed in Milford, Delaware, 2002, it started as a four-piece band and was originally called An April Sun Setting. The band originally consisted of: vocalist David Rushman, guitarist/vocalist Matthew Turner, bassist Brain Miller, and drummer Mike MacMillan. The band released a 4-track 7 Stones Sessions on March 4, 2003. Suddenly, Mike MacMillan had to leave on March 7, 2003, and was replaced by Blair Allen on March 21, 2003. Later the band released their third EP called A Cure for the Common Broken Heart in June 2003. On June 6, 2003, Blair Allen had to leave after 3 months of joining the band.

Eventually on July 3, 2003, Andrew Rapp officially joined as drums, and soon, Will DiMondi also joined as second guitarist in August. That same month the band released their self-titled EP. The band changed their name My America Is Watching Tigers Die in May 2004. On May 19, 2004, Will DiMondi left to pursue another project, now playing bass with Your Eyes My Dreams. He was replaced on second guitar by Brett Carpenter. On September 4, 2004, the band released their fourth EP He Saved Himself For The Harlot.

=== 2005–2007: Narratives, and 30,000 Lbs. ===
The band appeared on Ours And Of Course, Your First Compilation Tape with Mountain Men Anonymous, The Sound O.E, Dear Tonight and more on January 31, 2005. The band released another self-titled EP in 2005. Shortly after the release, Brett Carpenter left the band to attend West Virginia University. He was not replaced, and the band would continue as a four piece. On February 16, 2006, the band signed to indie record label Emerald Moon Records (All Time Low, The Jonbenét, and Fall River) and released their debut studio album Narratives on July 20, 2006.

The album received some praise from publications like Lambgoat and they would also appear in Hanging Like a Hex “My America is Watching Tigers Die delivers a heavy dosage of the mosh mania of Every Time I Die, with the sonic bombast experimentalism of Breather Resist.” The band released a followup seven inch, 30,000 Lbs., via Emerald Moon in August 2007.

=== 2008–2009: Stone age, and David’s departure ===
On March 20, 2008, the band signed to Pluto records (As I Lay Dying, Horse the Band, and Society's Finest) after which they met Chris Owens (Breather Resist, Coliseum, Ed Gein) who would go on to produce their second studio album Stone Age, released on July 8, 2008. Before the release the band posted songs to their Myspace and announced some tours. The LP received reviews from Mammoth Press, Subba-Cultcha, V13 and Lambgoat.

On September 24, 2008, it was announced that David was leaving the band due to entering the workforce and other life changes after graduating from the University of Delaware. The band would continue as a three piece, with Matthew taking on lead vocal duties, with Brian providing backup vocals. At this point, they also officially shortened their name to My America, though they had been unofficially using this shortened version of the name for quite some time.

=== 2010–2016: Hurry Up & Chill, Misses, and break up ===
My America did a show at Union Pool on May 28, 2010, with Ken Mode and Engineer. My America played at the Acheron with Keelhaul on August 6, 2010. The band left Pluto Records and went independent, the band self-released their third studio album Hurry Up & Chill on December 2, 2010. My America played a show with Coliseum, Sannhet at the Acheron in Brooklyn on August 5, 2013. My America played a show with North, Bezoar, and Thera Roya at the Knitting Factory on August 11, 2014. The band went on a small Hiatus and signed into The Ghost is clear Records (Big Water, Tigon, Canyons, and Prayer Group). Matthew Turner did an interview with No Echo on March 23, 2015, where he shared the humble beginnings that eventually led to his eclectic taste. A single Bad Host was released on April 6, 2015. The band appeared in Vice News where they explained that "Bad Hosts" was a B-side from the Misses sessions that took place in February 2015.

The band teased their upcoming album Misses from multiple news like New Noise Magazine, Matthew talked over the album's creation and the band's history on Substream Magazine stating “After playing music together for over 10 years I feel like we finally have something that’s truly representative of us. Something that captures our live sound…this is definitely the record I’ve wanted us to release for a long time.” The album was being worked along Kevin Bernsten (Skeletonwitch, Walk The Plank, and Outer Heaven) and Brad Boatright to master the album at Audiosiege. The band reverted their name back to My America Is Watching Tigers Die. On September 30, 2016, they'll released their last studio album Misses. They did their last show at Fat Baby, LES NYC and disbanded in late 2016.

== Musical styles and influences ==
My America Is Watching Tigers Die is seen as a noise rock, grunge, thrash metal, post hardcore, hardcore punk band.

The band were influenced by many bands like Deadguy, Knut, The Jesus Lizard, Botch, and Coalesce.

== Band Members ==
- Matthew Turner - Guitar and vocals (2002–2016)
- Brian Miller - Bass and vocals (2002–2016)
- Andrew Rapp - Drums (2003–2016)
- David Rushman - Vocals (2002–2008)
- Will DiMondi - Guitar (2003–2004)
- Mike MacMillan - Drums (2002–2003)
- Blair Allen - Drums (2003–2003)

== Discography ==
=== Studio albums ===
- Narratives (2006)
- Stone Age (2008)
- Hurry Up & Chill (2010)
- Misses (2016)

=== Extended plays ===
- 7 Stones Session Demos (2003)
- A Cure for the Common Broken Heart (2003)
- An April Setting Sun (2003)
- He Saved Himself for the Harlot (2004)
- My America Is Watching Tigers Die (2005)
- 30,000 Lbs. (2007)
