= R. Borlax =

Studio album by Horse the Band
- Released: November 25, 2003; August 21, 2007 (re-released)
- Recorded: January 2003
- Genre: Nintendocore; post-hardcore; metalcore; noise rock
- Length: 34:43
- Label: Pluto
- Producer: HORSE the band

Horse the Band chronology
Beautiful Songs by Men (2002)	R. Borlax (2003)	The Mechanical Hand (2005)

Professional ratings
Review scores
Source	Rating
AllMusic	2.5/5 stars

R. Borlax is the debut album by Horse the Band, released in 2003 on Pluto Records. It was re-released in 2007 with two bonus tracks by Koch Records. As with all Horse the Band recordings, the keyboards are used to mimic the 8-bit sound produced by the Nintendo Entertainment System. This is the band's only release with bassist Andy Stokes and the last with drummer Jason Karuza.

== Track listing ==
All lyrics are written by Nathan Winneke; all music is composed by Horse the Band.

No.	Title	Length
1.	"Seven Tentacles and Eight Flames"	3:11
2.	"Cutsman"	3:51
3.	"In the Wake of the Bunt"	4:18
4.	"Stabbers of the Knife, by Kenny Pelts"	3:02
5.	"Bunnies"	3:33
6.	"Purple"	4:48
7.	"Handsome Shoved His Gloves"	3:23
8.	"The Immense Defecation of the Buntaluffigus"	1:23
9.	"Pol's Voice"	4:00
10.	"Big Blue Violence"	3:14

Re-release bonus tracks
No.	Title	Length
11.	"The Legend of the Flower of Woe"	4:39
12.	"Kangarooster 4057"	2:13

== Personnel ==
- Nathan Winneke – lead vocals
- David Isen – guitar
- Andy Stokes – bass
- Erik Engstrom – keyboards, backing vocals
- Jason Karuza – drums
