= Pizza (EP) =

EP by Horse the Band
- Released: September 5, 2006
- Genre: Nintendocore, metalcore, chiptune
- Length: 20:15
- Label: Koch
- Producer: Dan Koch

Horse the Band chronology
The Mechanical Hand (2005)	Pizza (2006)	A Natural Death (2007)

Professional ratings
Review scores
Source	Rating
AllMusic	2.5/5 stars
Punknews.org	3.5/5 stars

Pizza is a concept EP and the third studio release by Horse the Band, released September 5, 2006 through Koch Records. The EP was recorded in place of Horse the Band not finishing their time on The Stampeading Machines Tour. 550 limited edition copies of the EP were pressed in the 10" vinyl format, sold in cardboard pizza boxes, on the band's label LIF Records.

== Overview ==
According to the band's MySpace blog, Horse the Band ended their time on "The Stampeding Machines Tour", almost halfway through in order to record the EP. One of their bulletins states:

"We left that tour because we ate really, really, really good pizza in Lou Malnati's in Chicago with Dave's grandparents. The pizza was such that we were inspired by God to write music of the kind not heard in this world since Mozart was fed his first currywurst. A copy of Nietzsche's 'The Gay Science' was onhand and for 2 days we struggled with the question posed in 'The Greatest Weight' passage, which follows. In essence, it asks the reader to examine their every action if they had to repeat their lives exactly for all eternity, begging the question [sic] in each and every thing, 'Do you desire this once more, and innumerable times more?' We couldn't decide if we should stay in Chicago and keep eating pizza for the rest of our lives. But after two days of rigorous theory, we realized we had to write divine music about the pizza. We decided to drive home immediately and write and record a 5-song EP called "Pizza" before Sounds of the Underground and Warped Tour started. God was there."

While recording the EP, fans sent Horse the Band pizza and are included in the liner notes. As a joke, while playing a 2007 show in Chicago, singer Nathan Winneke blamed the crowd (and the city itself) for being responsible for the EP, in a mockingly unaffectionate tone. The band then proceeded to play the song "Anti-Pizza".

In a 2008 interview, keyboardist Erik Engstrom stated that if he could delete anything from Horse the Band's catalog, it would be the Pizza EP.

The EP was recorded at 4th Street Recording in Santa Monica, CA.

== Track listing ==
All lyrics are written by Nathan Winneke, except where noted; all music is composed by Horse the band, except where noted.

No.	Title	Writer(s)	Length
1.	"Anti-Pizza"		4:34
2.	"Crippled by Pizza (Pizzarrhea in the Pizzeria)"		3:09
3.	"Werepizza"		6:33
4.	"Pizza Nif"		3:31
5.	"Teenage Mutant Ninja Turtles"	Chuck Lorre, Dennis C. Brown	2:28
Total length:			20:15

== Personnel ==
Horse the Band

- Nathan Winneke – vocals
- David Isen – guitar
- Erik Engstrom – keyboards
- Dashiell "Dash" Arkenstone – bass
- Chris Prophet – drums

Production

- Tracking by Chris Mullings at 4th Street Recording
- Mastered by Tom Baker at Precision Mastering
- Packaging design by LevinMedia
