= Stone Age (My America album) =

Studio album by My America Is Watching Tigers Die
- Released: July 8, 2008
- Recorded: March – April 2008
- Studio: Headbanging Kill Your Mama Music (Louisville, Kentucky)
- Genre: Noise rock; grunge; thrash metal; post hardcore; hardcore punk
- Length: 31:18
- Label: Pluto
- Producer: Chris Owens

My America Is Watching Tigers Die chronology
Narratives (2006)	Stone Age (2008)	Hurry Up & Chill (2010)

Stone Age is the second studio album by American noise rock band My America Is Watching Tigers Die, it was released on July 8, 2008, through Pluto Records. It was produced by Chris Owens.

== Background and recording ==
After the release of 30,000 Lbs, they signed into Pluto Records (As I Lay Dying, Horse the Band, and Society's Finest) on March 20, 2008. They would also meet Chris Owens (Breather Resist, Coliseum, Ed Gein) who'll help produce, engineer, and mix their second studio album Stone Age. It was recorded on Headbanging Kill Your Mama Music from March to April 2008 and was mastered by Alan Douches at West West Side. The album was released on July 8, 2008 and before the release, the band posted songs to their Myspace.

This was the last project that Rushman had worked on before his departure on September 24, 2008. He left due to "financial issues" according to Alternative Press, turning the band to a trio and Matthew had to take over as vocalist. This was also the last project to be called My America Is Watching Tigers Die until 2016.

== Reception ==
Professional ratings
Review scores
Source	Rating
Mammoth Press	8/10
Subba-Cultcha	7/10
V13	Negative

The LP received mixed reviews from Mammoth Press, Subba-Cultcha, V13 and Lambgoat.

Mammoth Press commented that the album was “a musical trip through a surprisingly catchy variant of violent and unpredictable hardcore.”

V13 stated that Rushman’s vocals were “irritating and annoying,” finishing the review with “not sure what the point in this disc is at all.”

== Tracking listing ==
All tracks are written by My America Is Watching Tigers Die.

No.	Title	Length
1.	"Stone Age"	0:38
2.	"No Future"	2:15
3.	"Brown Concrete"	2:11
4.	"Sipper"	4:16
5.	"6/6/1986"	4:58
6.	"Send More Cops"	3:54
7.	"Cannibisaur"	4:58
8.	"Xanax Zombies"	3:25
9.	"Corona Sports"	0:57
10.	"Piss & Vinegar"	3:42
Total length:		31:18

== Personnel ==
My America Is Watching Tigers Die

- David Rushman - Vocals
- Matthew Turner - Guitar and vocals
- Brian Miller - Bass and vocals
- Andrew Rapp - Drums

Technical Personnel

- Chris Owens - Audio production, engineering, producer and mixing
- Alan Douches - Sequencing and mastering at West West Side
- My America Is Watching Tigers Die - Artwork
