= The Plot Thickens =

The Plot Thickens may refer to:

- The Plot Thickens (film), a 1936 mystery film
- The Plot Thickens, alternate title of the 1935 film Here Comes Cookie, starring George Burns
- The Plot Thickens (The Jonbenét album), 2005
- The Plot Thickens (Galliano album), 1994
- The Plot Thickens (Turner Classic Movies podcast), 2020 to present
