= Stone Age (disambiguation) =

The Stone Age is a period of human prehistory.

Stone Age may also refer to:

== Music ==
- Stone Age (band), a French pop rock band
- Stone Age (My America album) or the title song, 2008
- Stone Age (Rolling Stones album), 1971
- Stoneage (Stone album), 1998
- "Stone Age!", a song by P-Model, from the album P-Model, 1992

== Film and television ==
- "The Stone Age" (The Goodies), an episode of The Goodies
- The Stone Age (film), a 1989 TV movie featuring Carmen du Sautoy
- Stone Age Cartoons, a 1940 American series of 12 animated short films from Fleischer Studios

== Other ==
- Stone Age Institute, an archaeological research center
- Stone Age (board game), 2008
- The Stone Age: Sixty Years of the Rolling Stones, a 2022 nonfiction book
- Operation Stone Age, a convoy operation in World War II

== See also ==
- The Stoned Age, a 1994 American comedy film
