= Math the Band =

American chiptune-based synthpunk band

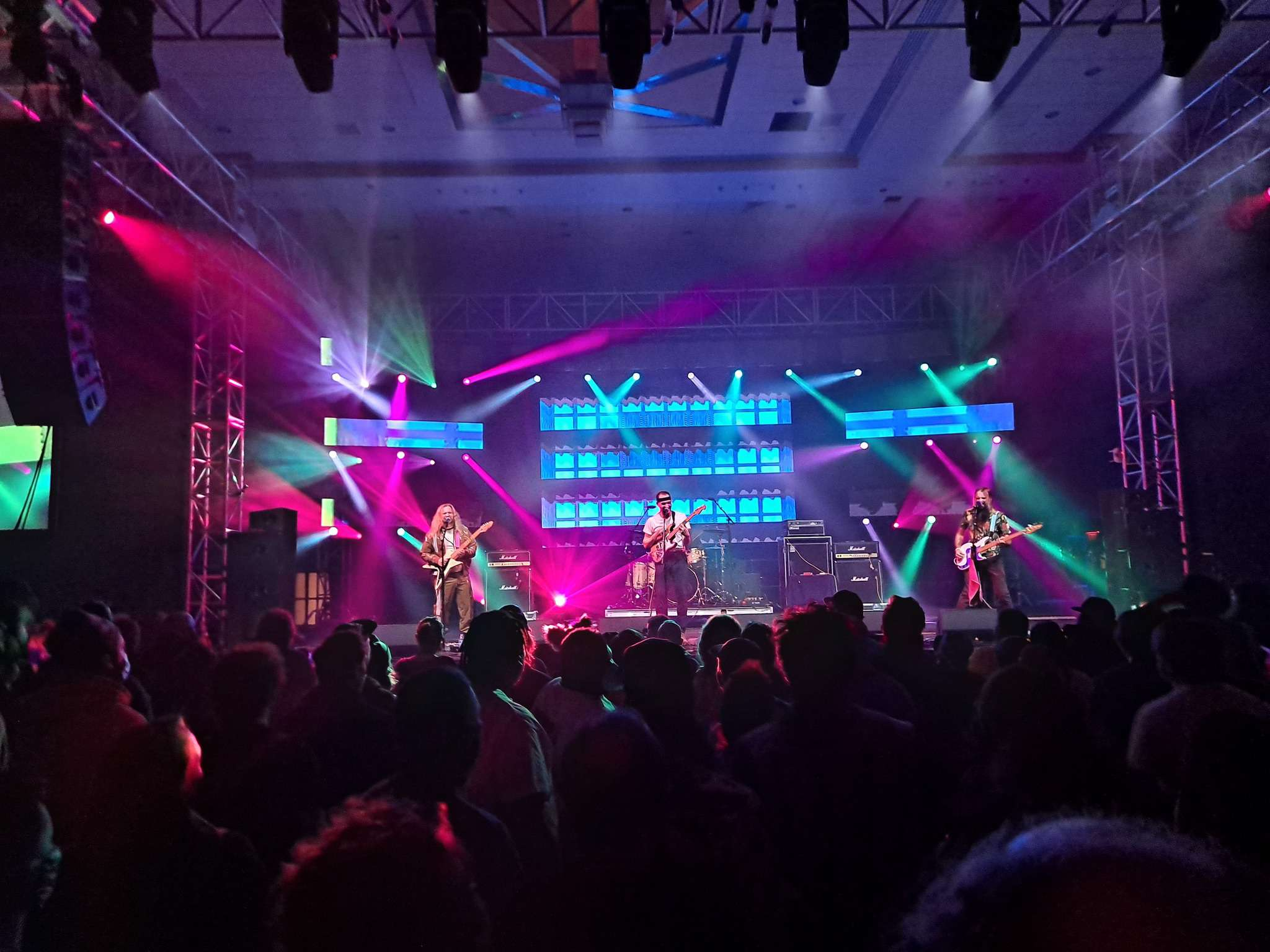
- Math the Band performing at Super MAGFest 2023.

Background information
- Also known as: Math the Band the Band; Matt the Band
- Origin: Providence, Rhode Island, United States
- Genres: Punk rock; chiptune; synthpunk; Nintendocore; indie rock; electronic
- Years active: 2002–present
- Labels: Self-released; Slanty Shanty; Anchor Brain; Brinker International Music
- Members: Kevin Steinhauser; Max Holbrook; Adam Waz; Matt Zappa
- Past members: Joe DeGeorge; Neil King; Justine Mainville; Jeff McGowan; Jon Pagano; Scott Nelson

Math the Band is an American chiptune-based synthpunk band from Providence, Rhode Island formed in 2002 by Kevin Steinhauser. Originally being a solo project by Steinhauser, the band's style has been sometimes called Nintendocore. The band has performed over 1000 shows throughout the United States, Mexico, Canada, and the United Kingdom, touring with bands, artists and rappers such as Andrew W.K., Japanther, Wheatus, MC Frontalot, Horse the Band MC Chris, Peelander-Z, Anamanaguchi and MC Lars. Math the Band has been featured in several magazines such as Venus Zine and Keyboard Magazine, and were also featured on NPR Music. Still, with band members spread across the United States, Math the Band is based in Providence, Rhode Island and are a part of Providence's AS220 and have performed there multiple times.

Since 2017, Math the Band has been Kevin Steinhauser, Max Holbrook, Adam Waz, and Matt Zappa.

== History ==
=== Formation as a solo project and early years (2002–2006) ===
Math the Band was originally the solo project of sixteen-year-old Kevin Steinhauser created in 2002, "doing his own thing" after getting kicked out of other bands he was in during high school for reasons he attributed to him "not being any good" – most notably, Christian pop punk band The Schwartz where he played guitar and was the only non-religious member. The origin of the name Math the Band originates from Steinhauser thinking of band names and having a pin on his backpack that simply said "Math" on it and he wanted a pin for his band so he named the band after the pin. During this time starting in 2002, Steinhauser released the studio albums: Robots Will Rise, Eep! An EP!, One Man Band For Single-Celled Organisms, The Lost Levels, Math the Band and the Secret of Mystery Island, Imaginary Everything, Greatest Hits and All Good Things, All in Good Time all under the Math the Band name and did live shows with a laptop and sometimes a box of costumes.

=== Transition to duo (2007–2017) ===
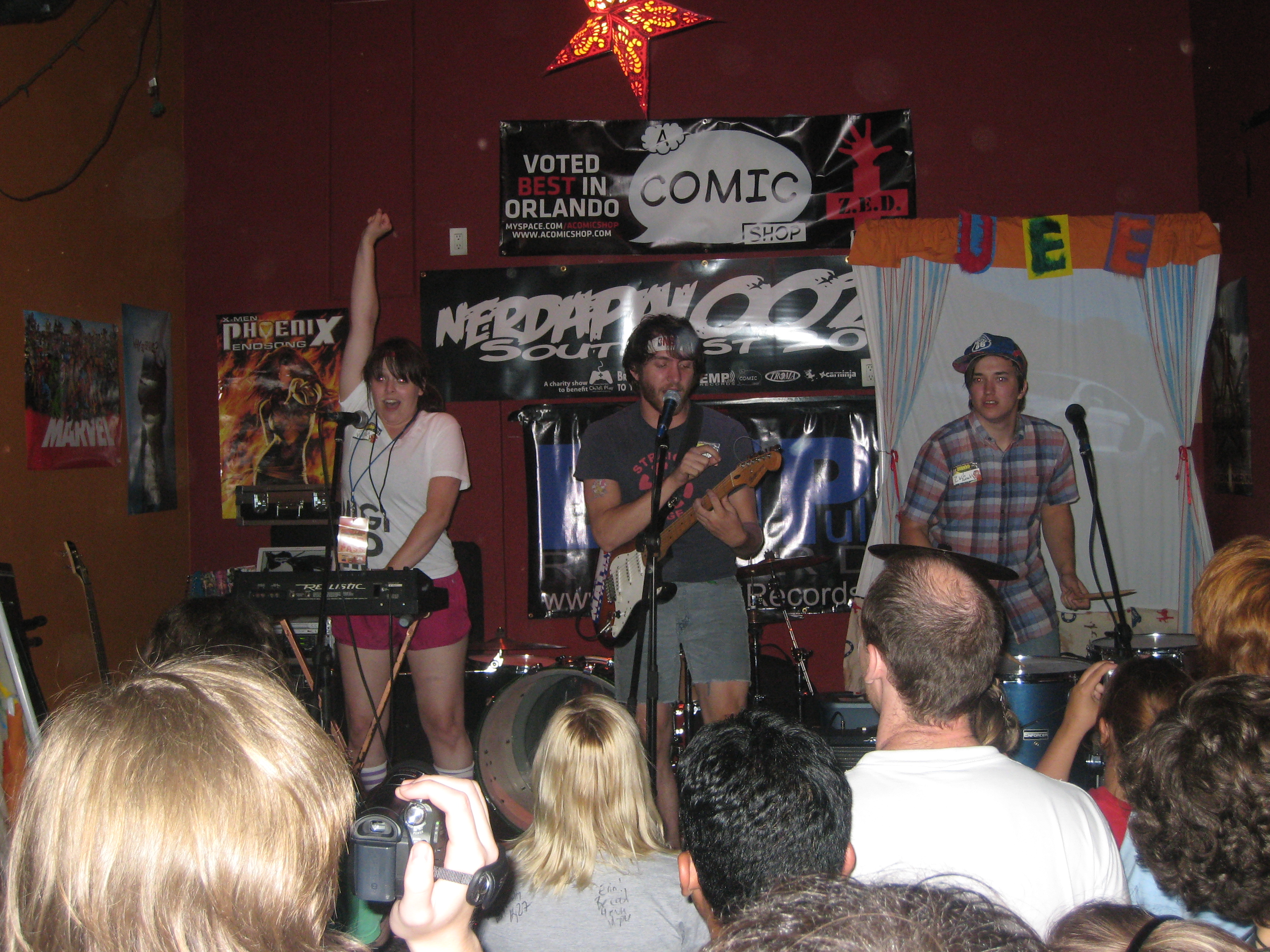
Kevin Steinhauser, Justine Mainville and Zach Burba performing as Math the Band in July 2008.

Steinhauser met Justine Mainville after playing a few shows with her then-band The Reaganauts while they were both in college. They later became friends and dated, leading Steinhauser to ask her to join on drums and synthesizer in 2007. The duo lineup of Math the Band released the studio albums: Math the Band Banned the Math, Don't Worry, Get Real, No Thing, Stupid and Weird and Math the Band the Band the Album.

=== Transition to band and Flange Factory Five (2018–present) ===
Mainville later left the band and Max Holbrook, Adam Waz and Matt Zappa joined the band. In 2019 and 2020 they performed at PAX East and MAGFest and played with a setlist featuring yet-unreleased songs announced as part of their young adult fantasy novel. On April 20, 2020 they released the single "Wet Cement", the music video's description announced it as part of Flange Factory Five, a five-part series of releases based on the band's yet to be released at the time studio album of the same name. The album itself released on October 1, 2020, and is the third release in a collection of five monthly releases. The second single from the album titled "Duel of the Deer" released on July 5, 2020. The first release under the name Flange Factory Five was Flange Factory Five: the Novel a book which is a "fantasy adventure novel with magic, wizards and other characters". On October 23, 2020, the band streamed the first part of live reading the book on their YouTube account. The second release was an energy drink advertised as "A New Sport Utility Beverage" The fourth release was a guitar pedal, Steinhauser describes it as "a replica of the pedal that's a playback device of the album, and you can make the sound go all weird." and was originally planned for a release in November but was released in early December along with an accompanying demo. The fifth was planned for a release in December and be a video game for the Game Boy Color, it is unknown when it will release but is currently in development, its released date was delayed due to their making sure the game was up to "gamer standards".

On March 16, 2021, Math the Band announced an online concert at AS220 for March 25, it was their first show since the COVID-19 pandemic. On April 1, the band released the music video for "That Thing You Don't", in the video the band stars on a fictional TV show titled Good Morning Void, at the end of the video, Steinhauser and a fictional manager are seen in the studio watching the performance, before the manager begins berating Steinhauser, and eventually "firing" him, upon being asked by Steinhauser who would replace him, the release of "Duel of the Deer (Matt the Band)" single was announced and released the same day.

For April Fools 2022, Math the Band live streamed an "album delease" for Flange Factory Five featuring Steinhauser and Waz playing the entire album, providing commentary and subsequently destroying copies of multiple versions of Flange Factory Five removing it from streaming services, since then the album has remained removed. Steinhauser also mentioned the delay of the Game Boy Color game saying "it originally was going to be a five-minute-long thing that just got to a point in the book, and it was like do this thing and then I was like I wanna make it a longer thing and it's just not done yet." Him and Waz also joked that after the album delease and it's finished, it could be "preleased".

On January 7, 2023, Math the Band performed at Super MAGFest 2023.

== Musical style and influences ==
Math the Band has described their music as "glitched-out, chaotic, celebration pop for the constantly anxious." Stylistically, the band is characterized as Nintendocore, punk rock, chiptune, indie rock, synthpunk, dance-punk, electronic, synth-pop, pop and pop punk

Math the Band uses vintage analog synthesizers, drum machines, hacked second and third generation video game consoles and homemade synthesizers to make loud and fast, punk rock music. Math the Band, specifically Steinhauser has cited Atom and His Package, Andrew W.K., Steve Roggenbuck Nathan Fielder, and Devo as influences.

== Band members ==
=== Current members ===
- Kevin Steinhauser – guitar, programming, lead vocals (2002–present), laptop (2002–2007)
- Max Holbrook – guitar, backing vocals (2014–present)
- Adam Waz – bass, backing vocals (2017–present)
- Matt Zappa – drums (2016, 2017–present)

=== Former members ===
- Scott Nelson – bass
- Joe DeGeorge – keyboard (2014–2015), saxophone (2014)
- Neil King – drums (2014–2017)
- Justine Mainville – synthesizer, backing vocals, drum tom, drum cymbal, sequence track (2007–2017)
- Jeff McGowan – bass (2014–2018)
- Jon Pagano – guitar, synthesizer (2014–2018)

=== Former touring members ===
- Zach Burba – drums (2008–2009)
- Unknown – trombone

== Discography ==
=== Studio albums ===
Title	Album details
Robots Will Rise	Released: 2002; Label: Self-released; Format: CD
Eep! An EP!	Released: Spring 2003; Label: Self-released; Format: CD
The Lost Levels	Released: 2003; Label: Self-released; Format: CD
A One Man Band For Single-Celled Organisms	Released: 2004; Label: Self-released; Format: CD
Math the Band and the Secret of Mystery Island	Released: Summer 2005; Label: Self-released; Format: CD
Imaginary Everything	Released: 2005; Label: Self-released; Format: CD
Greatest Hits	Released: 2006; Label: Self-released; Format: CD
All Good Things, All in Good Time	Released: 2006; Label: Self-released; Format: CD
Math the Band Banned the Math	Released: May 5, 2008; Label: Self-released; Format: Digital download, CD
Don't Worry	Released: May 5, 2009; Label: Slanty Shanty Records; Format: Digital download, CD, cassette
Get Real	Released: November 20, 2012; Label: Slanty Shanty Records, Anchor Brain Records; Format: Digital download, CD
No Thing	Released: November 20, 2012; Label: Self-released; Format: Digital download
Stupid and Weird	Released: February 4, 2014; Label: Anchor Brain Records; Format: Digital download, CD, LP
Math the Band the Band the Album	Released: October 1, 2015; Label: Self-released; Format: Digital download, CD, LP
Flange Factory Five	Released: October 1, 2020; Label: Brinker International; Format: Digital download, streaming, LP

=== Compilation albums ===
Title	Album details
Beethoven the Movie	Released: June 1, 2010; Label: Slanty Shanty Records; Format: CS

=== Extended plays ===
Title	Details
Math the Band and the Secret of Mystery Island	Released: 2005; Label: Self-released; Format: CD
Nature	Released: 2006; Label: Self-released; Format: CD
Shoes	Released: 2006; Label: Self-released; Format: CD
Teeth	Released: 2007; Label: Self-released; Format: CD
Banana Split w/ Iji	Released: 2007; Label: Self-released; Format: CD
Covers EP	Released: 2007; Label: Self-released; Format: Digital download
Tour de Friends	Released: 2008; Label: Self-released; Format: CD, CS
Accident Comedy Doctor pt. 4	Released: 2009; Label: Self-released; Format: VHS
Get Off My Lawn	Released: 2011; Label: Self-released; Format: Vinyl
Best Swishes, Thanks a Dunks	Released: 2012; Label: Self-released; Format: CD

=== Singles ===
Year	Title	Album
2009	"Why Didn't You Get a Haircut?"	Don't Worry
2009	"Floppy Disk #1"	Non-album single
2011	"Four to Six"	Get Real
2013	"January 2008"	Stupid and Weird
2020	"Wet Cement"	Flange Factory Five
2020	"Duel of the Deer"	Flange Factory Five
2021	"Duel of the Deer (Matt the Band)"	Non-album single

=== Compilations and soundtracks ===
- 2009 – Up End Atom: A Tribute To Atom And His Package
  - Features the track "Upside Down From Here" (originally by Atom and His Package)
- 2012 – Let's Big Happy (Original Soundtrack)
  - Features the track "Bad Jokes"
- 2020 – AS220 Summer Sampler 2020
  - Features the track "Wet Cement"
- 2020 – LINE THE FRONT: A BENEFIT COMPILATION FOR RI SOLIDARITY FUND
  - Features the track "Duel Of The Deer (previously unreleased)"

=== Other appearances ===
- 2014 – For all the Girls – 70 Love Songs
  - "Desirae (feat. Math the Band)"

=== Music videos ===
List of music videos with director(s) and notes
Year	Title	Director	Notes
2006	Shark Attack	Unknown	Video lost and mentioned by Steinhauser in an interview, mentioned it might not be shown to the public.
2009	Why Didn't You Get Haircut?	Chris Shashaty	—N/a
2009	Hang Out/Hang Ten	Andy Devlin and Embrace Your Awesome Productions	—N/a
2011	Four To Six	Jonathan Yi and Sam Goetz	—N/a
2012	Down	AD Lane	—N/a
2012	Horses	Carman Spoto	—N/a
2012	I Hope You Die	Johnny Weiss and Jesse Gouldsbury	—N/a
2012	Bad Jokes	Antonio Cisneros	—N/a
2012	Stay Real (Sock It To Me Satan)	Ian Danskin	—N/a
2012	Positive Stress	Frank Howley	Uploaded onto the Frank Howley YouTube channel.
2012	Get Real	FISHBOY	—N/a
2012	GUTS	Jonathan Killoran	—N/a
2012	Brand New Physics	Jono Gray	—N/a
2012	NAHH	—N/a	—N/a
2012	Mission Statement	Adam Theroux	—N/a
2013	Hey Alright	—N/a	—N/a
2013	January 2008	Johnny Weiss and Jesse Gouldsbury	—N/a
2014	Stupid and Weird	CrashBoomBang Productions	—N/a
2015			—N/a
2015	I Ate the Mold	Adam Waz and Moxicotton	—N/a
2015	Didn't Have Time to Think	Many Hearts (Jesse Gouldsbury and Johnny Weiss)	—N/a
2020	"Wet Cement"	Adam Waz	Shot by each band member at their house while in quarantine during the COVID-19 pandemic
2021	"That Thing You Don't"	Unknown	—N/a

== Filmography ==
Year	Title	Role	Notes
2012	Let's Big Happy	Themselves (Kevin Steinhauser and Justine Maineville)	Episode: "Math the Band"

== Bibliography ==
- Flange Factory Five: the Novel (2020)
