= A Natural Death =

Studio album by Horse the Band
- Released: August 28, 2007
- Recorded: February 2007 at Stagg Street Studios and Where's My Check Studios
- Genre: Nintendocore, noise rock, hardcore punk
- Length: 56:04
- Label: Koch
- Producer: Brian Virtue

Horse the Band chronology
Pizza (2006)	A Natural Death (2007)	Desperate Living (2009)

Professional ratings
Review scores
Source	Rating
AllMusic	link
Rocklouder	link
Rockmidgets.com	link

A Natural Death is the third studio album by Horse the Band. This is the band's last album with bassist Dashiell Arkenstone (son of musician David Arkenstone) and the only one with drummer Chris Prophet.

== Overview ==
Frontman Nathan Winneke states: "A Natural Death is about the futility and arrogance of creation and destruction, the overwhelming scale of space and time, and the brutal majesty of nature, the horror of birth, and the beauty of death. Everyone who will ever live will die a natural death, and will soon after be forgotten for eternity. Hopefully this album will serve as a warning to the human race to stop taking itself so seriously, as we have seen the dire consequences of its actions in the future. You are nothing."

Upon the album's release, "Murder" was frequently played on the Sirius Satellite Radio station, Hard Attack. In 2007, the album peaked at #4 at the Top Heatseekers and at #27 on the Independent Albums charts.

== Track listing ==
All lyrics are written by Nathan Winneke; all music is composed by Horse the Band.

No.	Title	Length
1.	"Hyperborea"	2:45
2.	"Murder"	4:14
3.	"The Startling Secret of Super Sapphire"	3:18
4.	"The Beach"	1:07
5.	"Face of Bear"	4:02
6.	"Crickets"	1:06
7.	"New York City"	4:47
8.	"Sex Raptor"	3:18
9.	"Broken Trail"	3:16
10.	"The Red Tornado"	3:42
11.	"Treasure Train"	2:57
12.	"His Purple Majesty"	3:04
13.	"Kangarooster Meadows"	1:23
14.	"Rotting Horse"	4:28
15.	"I Think We Are Both Suffering from the Same Crushing Metaphysical Crisis"	7:24
16.	"Lif"	4:48

Best Buy bonus tracks
No.	Title	Length
17.	"Crow Town"	3:40
18.	"Hyperborea" (MIDI version)	2:34
19.	"Treasure Train" (Midi version)	2:54

iTunes bonus track
No.	Title	Length
17.	"The Red Tornado" (Midi version)	2:45

== Trivia ==
- Originally the song "Crow Town" was on the album as track 10, and "The Red Tornado" was track 9, this was replaced just after the release with "Broken Trail". In the song "Lif" where various fragments of the previous songs are played throughout, you can hear the crows crowing at one point, exactly as they do in the song "Crow Town" furthermore showing it was an original song for the album.
- The song "The Red Tornado" refers to the comic book superhero Red Tornado.

== Personnel ==
Horse the Band

- Erik Engstrom – keyboards, Game Boy, samples
- Nathan Winneke – vocals
- David Isen – guitar
- Dashiell Han Arkenstone – bass, baritone guitar, organ
- Chris Prophet – drums

Production

- Brian Virtue – production, engineering, mixing
- David Klein – album artwork and layout
