= As I Lay Dying / American Tragedy =

Studio album by As I Lay Dying and American Tragedy
- Released: June 18, 2002
- Recorded: April 2002
- Genre: Metalcore
- Length: 36:08
- Label: Pluto
- Producer: Brian Cobbel, Eric Shirey

As I Lay Dying chronology
Beneath the Encasing of Ashes (2001)	As I Lay Dying/American Tragedy (2002)	Frail Words Collapse (2003)

American Tragedy chronology
As I Lay Dying/American Tragedy (2002)

Professional ratings
Review scores
Source	Rating
AllMusic	3/5 stars

As I Lay Dying / American Tragedy is a split album by the two metalcore bands As I Lay Dying and American Tragedy released in 2002 through Pluto Records. As I Lay Dying has since re-released its half of the album through Metal Blade Records. Their compilation album A Long March: The First Recordings also features the original and re-recorded tracks from the split album. Tracks 1 through 5 are performed by As I Lay Dying, while tracks 6 through 11 are performed by the now defunct American Tragedy.

American Tragedy's sound on the split album is slightly similar to that of As I Lay Dying.

== Track listing ==
As I Lay Dying
No.	Title	Length
1.	"Illusions"	3:56
2.	"The Beginning"	2:48
3.	"Reinvention"	4:56
4.	"The Pain of Separation"	2:50
5.	"Forever"	4:16

American Tragedy
No.	Title	Length
6.	"-"	1:14
7.	"Choking On a Dream"	1:49
8.	"World Intruded"	4:05
9.	"Spite and Splinter"	3:12
10.	"Porcelain Angels"	2:03
11.	"Moments and In Between"	5:07
Total length:		36:08

== Credits ==
As I Lay Dying

- Tim Lambesis – lead vocals
- Evan White – lead guitar
- Brandon Hays – bass
- Jordan Mancino – drums
- Tommy Garcia – rhythm guitar, backing vocals

American Tragedy

- Tim Syler – vocals
- Jon Greene – lead guitar
- Todd Shields – bass
- Ryan Douglass – rhythm guitar
- Justin Greene – drums

Other credits

- Nolan Brett – mastering
- Jeff Forest – recording, engineering, harmony vocals
- Eric Shirey – executive producer
- Brian Cobbel – executive producer
