= The Plot Thickens (The Jonbenét album) =

2005 compilation album by The Jonbenét

Compilation album by The Jonbenét
- Released: July 26, 2005
- Recorded: June – November 2004
- Studio: 7A Studios
- Genre: Post-hardcore; noise rock
- Length: 25:33
- Label: Pluto

The Jonbenét chronology
Five Stores Retold (2004)	The Plot Thickens (2005)	Ugly/Heartless (2006)

The Plot Thickens is a compilation album by American noise rock band The Jonbenét, released on July 26, 2005, via Pluto Records. It was the last release that bassist Chris Goodwin was involved in before being replaced by Wil Spent. The first three tracks are from a split with The Kidnap Soundtrack and latter were from Five Stories Retold.

The album was named "Best Heavy Sh*t" by Free Press Houston. The Jonbenét was one of the contenders for Best Hardcore/Screamo Band in the Houston Press Music Awards. The band released a music video for the track "Behold, The White Whore."

== Background and recording ==
The band entered a contract with Pluto Records and announced that they would release an 8-song compilation featuring music from their previous two EPs. They also announced that they would tour the record. Tracks 4–8 were recorded in June 2004 for Five Stories Retold and tracks 1–3 were recorded in November 2004 at 7A Studios for The Jonbenet/The Kidnap Soundtrack split EP. The Hardcore Report interviewed guitarist Dann Miller to promote the release.

"Eating Lightning Pt. I" has a sequel on their next release, Ugly/Heartless.

== Reception ==
Professional ratings
Review scores
Source	Rating
Exclaim!	Positive
Sputnikmusic	4/5 stars
PunkNews.org	3.5/5 stars
The Metal Forge	Positive
Lambgoat.com	7/10
Free Press Houston	Positive
Neufutur Magazine	7.2/10

The album received mostly positive reviews. Justin Donnelly of The Metal Forge stated, "Chaotic screaming technical post-hardcore (Or whatever name you want to put on this particular style of music) is nothing new these days, especially given the ever increasing number of acts emerging onto the scene rising as the days tick over. The Jonbenét on the other hand actually manage to sound fresh and interesting on The Plot Thickens." Ariana Rock of Exclaim! gave a positive review, saying, "The result is a bloody, earth-shattering rocker of an album that you will find yourself absorbed in." They continue with, "The urgency of the guitars and vocals is dropped, stumbled over, tossed aside, and thrown into the wind like an old sneaker on a telephone pole, but kid, take a look around because this junk is hotter than the streets of Arizona, with a killer kick drum and a casual look over shoulder style of singing to catch your attention one last time before beating you down when you least expect it."

Brian Shultz of PunkNews.org gave an average rating, stating, "These are the Five Stories Retold tracks, and show the band at their most raw but seething with potential." They were later disappointed that "the first three songs on the disc however in Chapter II that we find the band starting to slide into a more original niche." They were hopeful for the band's future, stating, "if progression can occur this quickly, a more-than-solid debut full-length is certainly in the works from the outfit. Sputnikmusic gave the album an excellent review, saying, "the first three tracks of this album were newly recorded for the EP, whereas the last five are cleaned up versions of songs from previous works." They finished with "an excellent debut, and it is too bad the band doesn’t get as much attention as they deserve." Cory of Lambgoat was pleased by the effort, they called it "a surprisingly creative and adept entry into the ever-growing field of bands playing non-conventional hardcore." They mention "the frantic energy of the Jonbenet, coupled with their songwriting ability, makes this a difficult disc to stop listening to."

Free Press Houston was very impressed, noting "A rhythm section that will put you in the rafters and bang you 'til the blood runs to your temples, and vocals that spit nails." They close with, "If you want something to drive really fucking fast to, or a good mental sound track to curse out your teacher to, pick up The Plot Thickens." The album was later named "Best Heavy Sh*t" by Free Press Houston. Neufutur Magazine was optimistic for the future of the band, stating, "By the time that “Behold, The White Whore” comes out it becomes fairly obvious that The Jonbenet have taken the brief glimpses into a more hopeful future for noise."

== Track listing ==
All tracks are written by The Jonbenét.

No.	Title	Length
1.	"Eating Lightning Pt. I"	2:51
2.	"Dramarama"	2:48
3.	"Behold, The White Whore"	4:50
4.	"Eleventh Century Folklore"	2:54
5.	"Trophy Wives"	2:13
6.	"Stolen Home"	3:10
7.	"Scratch The Roman Numerals"	4:06
8.	"Bartleby"	2:38
Total length:		25:33

== Personnel ==
The Jonbenét

- Michael Murland - Vocals
- Dann Miller - Guitars and backing vocals
- Chris Goodwin - Bass
- J. Andrew Ireland - Drums and backing vocals

Technical personnel

- Chris Goodwin - Recording
- Nolan Brett - Mastering
