= Minibosses =

Progressive rock band

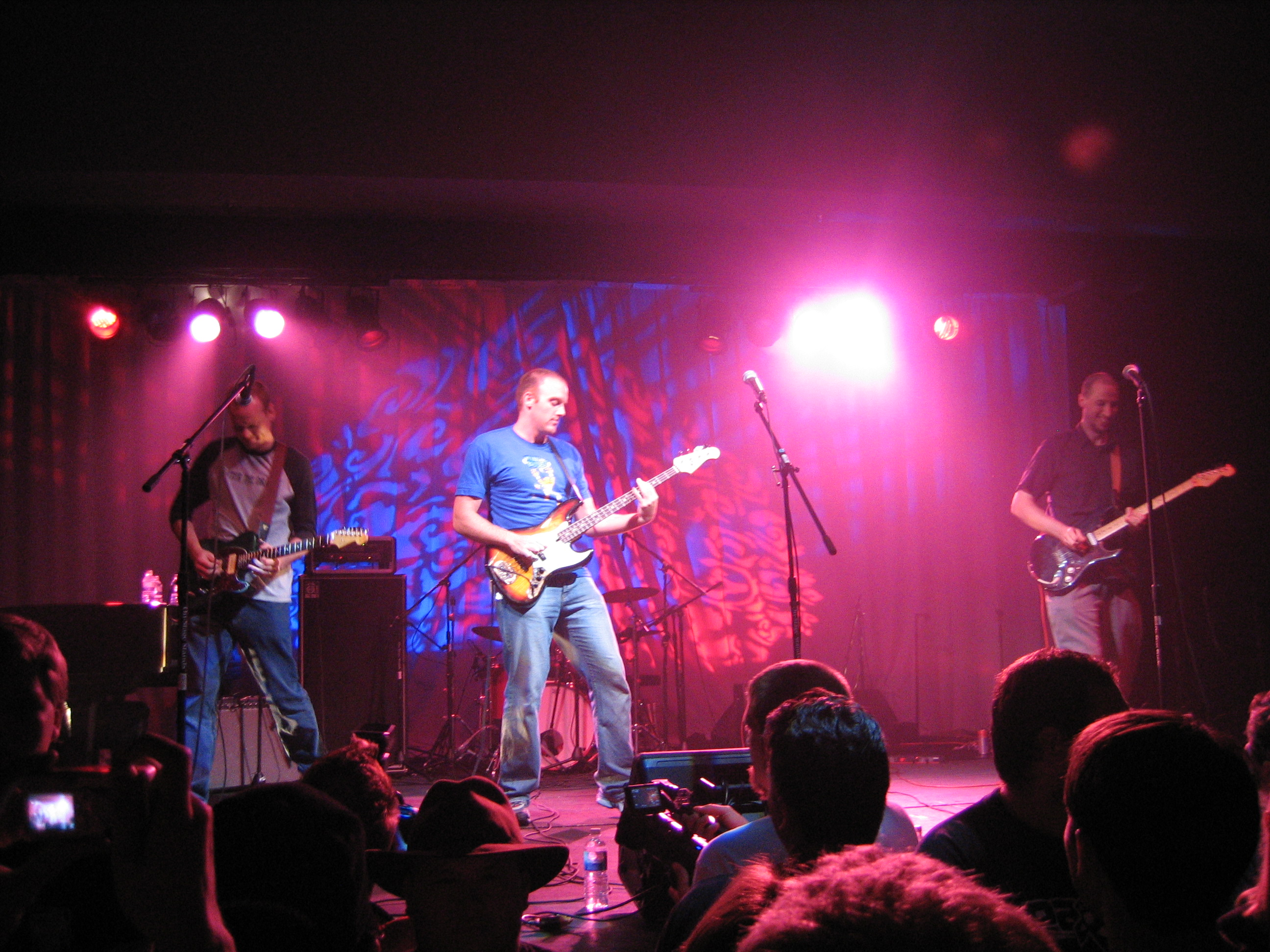
- Minibosses performing at Penny Arcade Expo 2005

Background information
- Origin: Northampton, Massachusetts
- Genres: Progressive rock; chiptune; Nintendocore; instrumental rock; geek rock
- Years active: 1999–present
- Members: Aaron Burke; Robin Vining; Brendan Dueck; Steve Dueck; Jakob Dueck; Owen Dueck
- Past members: Ben Baraldi; Fred Johnson; John Lipfert; Rich Smaldone; Robert Kelly Turner; Matt Wood

Minibosses is an American progressive rock band originally from Northampton, Massachusetts, and now located in Phoenix, Arizona. They are known for their video game music covers, which are instrumental rock variations of the theme music from classic Nintendo video games such as Mega Man, Metroid, and Castlevania. The Phoenix New Times awarded Minibosses their best cover band award in 2006.

== History ==
From 1997 to 1999, guitarist Aaron Burke and drummer Matt Wood played in Jenova Project, one of the earliest video game cover bands, along with other friends from the same dorm at the University of Massachusetts Amherst. In January 2000, Burke and Wood recruited bassist Ben Baraldi to form Minibosses. Initially, the band played both video game covers as well as original songs, and self-released their first album in September 2000. They were unsatisfied with the quality of this album and have since released new versions of their covers (as well as new covers) on the Minibosses/Penny Winblood split and Brass album. At the same time, they replaced their older songs, which had been freely available to download, with the newer versions found on Brass. From 2000 to present, the band has toured continuously while recording material for new albums.

== Members ==
=== Current ===
- Aaron Burke – guitar (1999–present)
- Robin Vining – guitar (2019–present), bass (2007–2019)
- Brendan Dueck – keyboards (2014–present)
- Steve Dueck – drums (2014–present)
- Jakob Dueck – bass (2019–present)
- Owen Dueck – drums (2019–present)

=== Former ===
- Robert Kelly Turner – guitar (2010)
- Ben Baraldi – guitar (2007–2010), bass (1999–2007)
- John Lipfert – guitar (2004–2007)
- Fred Johnson – guitar (2002–2004)
- Richard Smaldone – guitar (2001–2002)
- Matt Wood – drums (1999–2014)

== Discography ==
- Minibosses (Self-released on Kraid Records, 2000)
- Minibosses (EP) (Self-released, 2004)
- Live at the Middle East recorded at The Middle East nightclub (Self-released, 2004)
- Minibosses/Penny Winblood (Forge Records, 2005)
- Brass (Self-released, 2005)
- Brass 2: Mouth (Released December 2, 2011)
