= A Long March: The First Recordings =

Compilation album by As I Lay Dying
- Released: May 16, 2006
- Genre: Metalcore
- Length: 1:08:08
- Label: Metal Blade
- Producer: Tim Lambesis, Steve Russell

As I Lay Dying chronology
Shadows Are Security (2005)	A Long March: The First Recordings (2006)	An Ocean Between Us (2007)

A Long March: The First Recordings is the first compilation album by American metalcore band As I Lay Dying. The album was released on May 16, 2006, through Metal Blade Records. It features their first album Beneath the Encasing of Ashes (2001), as well as re-recorded and original versions of the songs featured on their split album with American Tragedy. The album debuted at no. 129 on the Billboard 200.

== Background ==
In January 2006, As I Lay Dying announced plans to re-release both of their out-of-print Pluto Records albums on one CD. The album would include the group's debut full-length, "Beneath The Encasing Of Ashes" in addition to their half of the split release with American Tragedy. The band also shared that the upcoming release would likely include a new version of the song "Reinvention," which the band intends to record in February. Look for the effort to hit stores in May via Metal Blade Records.

The album was released because the band - as they said - "were a bit tired of seeing Beneath the Encasing of Ashes being sold for unreasonable prices ($90+ on eBay)", so they decided to re-release all of their early recordings in one package." In a 2006 interview with Ultimate Guitar, Nick Hipa added that other labels that didn't have the band's best interests in mind were making offers to rights-holders Pluto Records for the albums' rights, and that the albums' were primarily available as bootlegs online, so the band and label agreed to purchase and re-release the songs in a "legitimate format."

The compilation's title is the title of the 8th track from Beneath the Encasing of Ashes, making "A Long March" the title track.

Amongst 5 re-recordings, "Reinvention" was specially recorded for this compilation in 2006, while "Illusions" was taken from Shadows Are Security and other 3 ones from Frail Words Collapse.

The version of the track "Beneath the Encasing of Ashes" that is presented on this compilation is slightly shorter than the version on its eponymous album, as it omits a line of spoken dialogue originally present at the beginning of the track.

== Critical reception ==
Professional ratings
Review scores
Source	Rating
Allmusic	3.5/5 stars
Jesus Freak Hideout	4/5 stars
V13.net	7.5/10 stars

Commercially, the album was the band's second to chart on the Billboard 200, debuting at no. 129 on June 3, 2006, and spending two weeks on the chart.

AllMusic reviewer Thom Jurek called the production "surprisingly clean" despite the small budget with which they were originally recorded, though he noted the drums sounded "a bit muddy." Crediting the band for "progressing considerably" since the songs debuted, Jurek noted the re-recording offerings were indeed superior, but credited the band for making the early works again available to fans. Other reviewers approached the record with nostalgia, appreciating the earlier, less-refined / commercially accessible sound of the tracks.

== Track listing ==
Re-recordings
No.	Title	Length
1.	"Illusions" (version with an intro appears on Shadows Are Security)	4:07
2.	"The Beginning" (appears on Frail Words Collapse)	3:28
3.	"Reinvention" (Re-Recorded in 2006)	4:59
4.	"The Pain of Separation" (appears on Frail Words Collapse)	2:56
5.	"Forever" (appears on Frail Words Collapse)	4:44

Beneath the Encasing of Ashes
No.	Title	Length
6.	"Beneath the Encasing of Ashes"	2:48
7.	"Torn Within"	1:46
8.	"Forced to Die"	2:42
9.	"A Breath In the Eyes of Eternity"	2:57
10.	"Blood Turned to Tears"	1:37
11.	"The Voices That Betray Me"	2:57
12.	"When This World Fades"	2:31
13.	"A Long March"	1:56
14.	"Surrounded"	0:51
15.	"Refined By Your Embrace"	1:44
16.	"The Innocence Spilled"	3:37
17.	"Behind Me Lies Another Fallen Soldier"	4:12

As I Lay Dying/American Tragedy
No.	Title	Length
18.	"Illusions"	3:55
19.	"The Beginning"	2:47
20.	"Reinvention"	4:56
21.	"The Pain of Separation"	2:49
22.	"Forever"	4:11

== Credits ==
- Jacob Bannon – Design, Photography
- Jeff Forest – Engineer, Mixing
- Tim Lambesis – Producer
- Paul Miner – Engineer
- Steve Russell – Producer, Engineer, Mixing
- Andy Sneap – Mixing
- Brad Vance – Mastering

== Charts ==
Chart (2006)	Peak position
US Billboard 200	129
US Independent Albums (Billboard)	5
