= Misses (My America Is Watching Tigers Die album) =

Studio album by My America Is Watching Tigers Die
- Released: September 30, 2016
- Studio: Developing Nations (Baltimore, Maryland)
- Genre: Noise rock; grunge; thrash metal; post hardcore; hardcore punk
- Length: 32:52
- Label: The Ghost Is Clear
- Producer: Kevin Bernsten

My America Is Watching Tigers Die chronology
Hurry Up & Chill (2010)	Misses (2016)

Singles from Misses
- 1. "Bad Host" Released: April 6, 2015

Misses is the fourth studio album by American noise rock band My America Is Watching Tigers Die. It was released on September 30, 2016 via The Ghost Is Clear Records. It was produced by Kevin Bernsten.

== Background and recording ==
After signing into The Ghost is clear Records, a single called Bad Host was released on April 6, 2015. The band appeared in Vice News where they explained that Bad Hosts was a B-side from the Misses sessions that took place in February of 2015.

The band teased their upcoming album Misses on New Noise Magazine and other outlets, Matthew talked about the album's creation and the band's history on Substream Magazine stating “After playing music together for over 10 years I feel like we finally have something that’s truly representative of us. Something that captures our live sound…this is definitely the record I’ve wanted us to release for a long time.” The album was being worked along Kevin Bernsten (Skeletonwitch, Walk The Plank, and Outer Heaven) at Developing Nations and Brad Boatright to master the album at Audiosiege.

The band reverted their name back to My America Is Watching Tigers Die and on September 30, 2016, they'll released their last studio album Misses.

== Reception ==
Professional ratings
Review scores
Source	Rating
Deadpulpit	Positive
Perte & Fracas	Negative

The album received mixed reviews from Dead Pulpit and French news outlet Perte & Fracas. Dead Pulpit showed the album in a positive light, while Perte & Fracas thought otherwise.

== Track listing ==
All tracks are written by My America Is Watching Tigers Die.

No.	Title	Length
1.	"Buried"	1:19
2.	"P.T.E."	2:39
3.	"Loser Fetish"	2:14
4.	"New Anxieties"	2:44
5.	"Nostalgia"	1:27
6.	"Bad Lede"	2:57
7.	"Outside"	3:14
8.	"Inside"	3:52
9.	"Thristwater"	3:19
10.	"Not Even Sweatin'"	1:06
11.	"Fifteen"	3:59
Total length:		32:52

== Personnel ==
My America Is Watching Tigers Die

- Matthew Turner - Guitar and Vocals
- Brian Miller - Bass and vocals
- Andrew Rapp - Drums

Technical Personnel

- Kevin Bernsten - Producer and Recording at Developing Nations in Baltimore, Maryland
- Brad Boatright - Mastering at Audiosiege in Portland, Oregon
