= The Mechanical Hand =

Studio album by Horse the Band
- Released: April 22, 2005
- Recorded: January 2005
- Studio: Jupiter Studios and Studio Litho
- Genre: Nintendocore; post-hardcore; chiptune; noise rock
- Length: 50:08
- Label: Combat
- Producer: Matt Bayles

Horse the Band chronology
R. Borlax (2003)	The Mechanical Hand (2005)	Pizza (2006)

Professional ratings
Review scores
Source	Rating
AbsolutePunk	(74%) link
Allmusic	3.5/5 stars
Pop Matters	4/10
Punknews.org	3.5/5 stars

The Mechanical Hand is the second studio album by Horse the Band, released in 2005 through Combat Records. Music videos were released for the songs "Birdo", "A Million Exploding Suns", and "Lord Gold Throneroom". This is the band's first release with bassist Dashiell Arkenstone and drummer Eli Green.

== Track listing ==
All lyrics are written by Nathan Winneke; all music is composed by Horse the Band.

No.	Title	Length
1.	"Birdo"	3:21
2.	"A Million Exploding Suns"	4:03
3.	"Manateen"	5:07
4.	"The House of Boo"	3:59
5.	"Heroes Die"	3:22
6.	"Softer Sounds"	3:37
7.	"Octopus on Fire"	4:26
8.	"Soaring Quails"	1:06
9.	"Taken by Vultures"	1:32
10.	"A Rusty Glove"	4:31
11.	"Sand"	4:22
12.	"Lord Gold Throneroom"	5:09
13.	"The Black Hole"	5:33
Total length:		50:08

== Personnel ==
- Nathan Winneke – vocals
- David Isen – guitar
- Erik "Lord Gold" Engstrom – keyboards
- Dashiell "Dash" Arkenstone – bass
- Eli Green – drums

== Allusions ==
- The title "Birdo" is taken from the video game character Birdo, who debuted in the Nintendo game Super Mario Bros. 2. The intro of the song is an audio clip from the animated film The Hobbit. The song is mostly inspired by lead singer Nathan Winneke's treatment by his stepfather. There was a video made for the song, in which the band play next to a grade school stage, while kids put on a play entitled "HORSE the play" where they also make reference to other songs on the album. Some people, in online forums, have criticised Irish rock band Snow Patrol, for their video "Signal Fire", made two years later, in which the band similarly plays while a grade school play is in progress.
- "A Million Exploding Suns" is a reference to the Marvel Comics character Sentry, who is described as having the power of a million exploding suns. The song also features a keyboard rendition of part of the first level theme song from the game Bionic Commando.
- "The House of Boo" holds reference to the stage and home of the ghost characters, Boos, in several of the Mario video game series titles. It also includes the score used in the games. The song itself is about an incident from Nathan Winneke's childhood where someone broke into his house.
- The title of the album gives reference to the Mechanical Hound in the novel Fahrenheit 451. The Phoenix on the album cover is also a reference to the Phoenix Crest, worn by the future firefighters in the novel.
