= Imperial (band) =

Metalcore band from Florida, United States

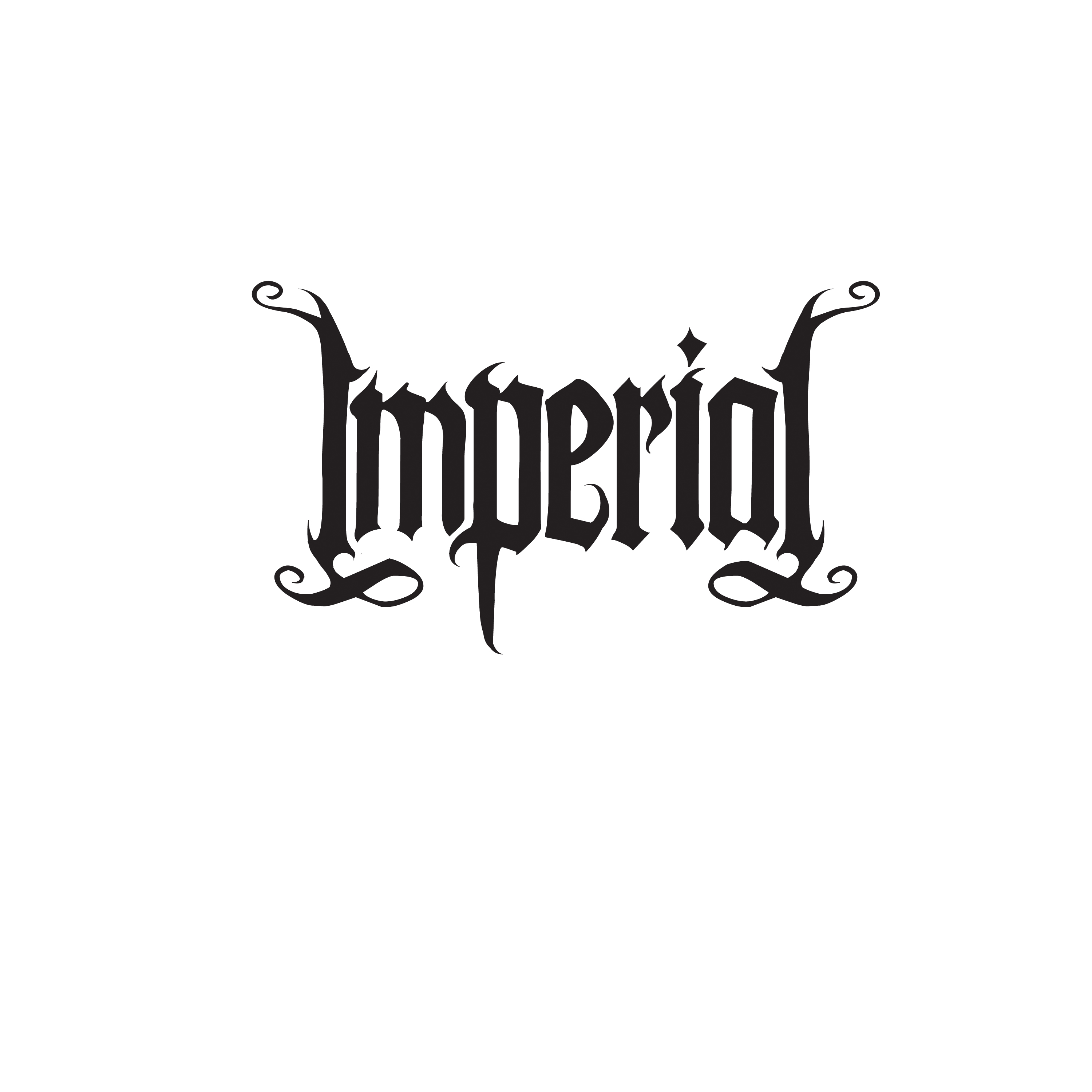

Background information
- Origin: Orlando, Florida, United States
- Genres: Metalcore
- Years active: 2003–present
- Labels: Pluto, Warner Music Group
- Members: Dale Dupree; Josh Lightfoot; Josh Adelman; Stephen Snyder; Adam Burton; Marco Mendoza

Imperial is an American metalcore band from Orlando, Florida. Their music is a mixture of modern metal, hardcore, and Black metal.

== History ==
Imperial was formed by Dale Dupree, Josh Lightfoot, and Brandon Pangle as "The Red Letter", in Orlando, Florida in 2003. They toured with other bands throughout the United States, ending with a performance at Cornerstone Festival in Illinois.

The tour resulted in a recording contract with Pluto Records. Shortly afterward, the band changed their name from "The Red Letter", due to other bands having similar names, to the name Imperial.

After signing with Pluto Records, the band released their first album, This Grave Is My Poem, with the help of Jeremy Staska at Studio 13 and Allan Douches at West West side for mastering duties.

After this release, they spent the next year touring national with other bands, as well as headlining their own tour. After the tours had completed, they began working on their new album.

During another concert tour, two members departed the band (Noah Southers and Sean Pulliam), leaving Dale Dupree, Josh Lightfoot and Brandon Pangle as the remaining members of Imperial.

After adding new band members to the lineup, Imperial continued to write for and record their new album, We Sail At Dawn. The record was released on September 26, 2006, and was followed by another tour.

Soon afterward, the band's three new members left Imperial. Guitar player Ivan Sherman and bass player Zack Fortune joined the band along with Zack "Nascar" on drums for a short period of time during the tour for We Sail at Dawn. Drummer Stephen Poole (also in Society's Finest, Inked in Blood) also filled in on drums for some local shows and a few tours.

We Sail At Dawn received a very average review nationally with very little negativity by the media, appearing in magazine reviews such as Revolver Magazine, featured on compilations such as Metal=Life Volume II and gaining radio play on local and college radio stations throughout the United States.

The band wrapped up 2008 with additional member changes. Most notably, founding member Brandon Pangle decided to leave the band to spend more time with his new wife.

The band added Josh Adelman as guitarist, and Chris Lane as drummer. The new four-member lineup, including original members Josh Lightfoot and Dale Dupree, are currently working on their upcoming album, Taken from The Bones of the Sea.

The album will be the first of a series of albums focused on the origins of fictional and modern day villains.

== Band members ==
Current members

- Dale Dupree – lead vocals (2003–present)
- Josh Lightfoot – guitars, Keyboards (2003–present)
- Josh Adelman – guitars (2008–present)
- Marco Mendoza – guitars (2009–present)
- Joe Gatell – drums (2003–present)
- Adam Burton – bass (2009–present)

Former members

- Chris Lane – drums (2008–2014)
- Brandon Pangle – lead vocals (2003–2008)
- Joe Gatell – drums (2003–2005)
- Sean Puliam – guitars (2003–2005)
- Noah Southers – bass (2003–2005)
- True Lawton – guitar (2005–2005
- Jake Caramanico – drums (2005–2006)
- Erick Crossley – guitar (2005–2007)
- Derek Anderson – bass (2005–2006)
- Vic Cruz – bass (2006–2007)
- Ivan Sherman – guitars (2006–2008)
- Zack Fortune – bass (2007–2008)
- Zack "Nascar" McCance – drums (2007–2008)
- Rick Pangle - piano, guitar

Touring musicians

- Stephen Poole – drums (2006–2007)

== Discography ==
- This Grave Is Our Poem - Pluto Records - (2005)
- We Sail at Dawn - Pluto Records (2006)
- Taken from the Bones of the Sea - Pluto Records (2010)
