= Shadows Are Security =

Studio album by As I Lay Dying
- Released: June 14, 2005
- Recorded: December 2004–January 2005
- Studio: Big Fish, Encinitas, California
- Genre: Melodic metalcore
- Length: 43:21
- Label: Metal Blade
- Producer: Tim Lambesis; Phil Sgrosso; Steve Russell

As I Lay Dying chronology
Frail Words Collapse (2003)	Shadows Are Security (2005)	A Long March: The First Recordings (2006)

Singles from Shadows Are Security
- 1. "Confined" Released: 2005; 2. "Through Struggle" Released: 2005; 3. "The Darkest Nights" Released: 2006

Shadows Are Security is the third studio album by American metalcore band As I Lay Dying. The album was released on June 14, 2005, through Metal Blade Records, and was produced by lead vocalist Tim Lambesis, guitarist Phil Sgrosso and Steve Russell. It is the band's first album to feature new members Nick Hipa and Phil Sgrosso, who would appear on all of the band's following releases until their hiatus in 2014. It is also the band's first album to chart on the Billboard 200, debuting (and peaking) at #35 July 2, 2005, and spending 9 weeks on the chart.

The album's title is derived from a lyric in the song Control Is Dead.

Musically, the album contains melodic death metal riffs.

== Background ==
In early January 2005, As I Lay Dying entered the studio to record a follow-up to their 2003 full-length Frail Words Collapse. Tracking would take place at Big Fish Studio in Encinitas, California, where the group recorded their last album. Mixing would occur in England with Andy Sneap. A release date was not provided, but the album was expected to be released later in the year.

The band toured extensively in the lead-up to, and following, the album's release: touring North America with Throwdown and All That Remains early 2005, performing on the "Hot Topic Second Stage" at Ozzfest 2005, heading to Europe as part of the "Hell On Earth European tour" alongside Evergreen Terrace, Heaven Shall Burn, Agents Of Man, Neaera, and End Of Days, and joining Slipknot and Unearth for "The Final Volume" tour. On June 24, 2005, the band played a CD Release Show in San Diego at Soma with Eighteen Visions, No Innocent Victim, and others.

Speaking on the recording process for the upcoming record in an interview to MTV.com, Lambesis said the band was less-rushed than when recording Frail Words Collapse. Lambesis praised Mancino's drumming, and noted that the guitar work on the upcoming album was more technical than prior releases. In an interview with the Great Falls Tribune, Lambesis said he hoped the album would be remembered as more of a "classic metal album" than a metalcore album, given the percise guitar work and lack of token breakdowns.

Lambesis has referred to the record as a concept album. Speaking on the meaning behind the album's title, Lambesis explained:

it just deals with the false sense of security we find in the things that we're taught and the way that most of us live, moreso instinctual and driven by our emotions and our feelings. To me, those things are like shadows. They're there one minute and gone the next. So one of the main themes of the record is how we need to change our entire sense of security and what it is that we've learned from our education systems and churches and all kinds of social norms and moral systems.

On April 30, 2005, the album's opening track "Meaning in Tragedy" was released exclusively via the Ozzfest.com website.

Several music videos were released for the album: including a video for the song "Confined" in June 2005, a video for the song "Through Struggle" in September 2005, and a video for the song "The Darkest Nights" in March 2006. The video for "Confined" made its MTV2 Headbangers Ball world premiere on June 4, 2005. The video was shot at an abandoned Air Force base in Tustin, California. Over 14 hours of footage was shot in the rain for the video. The video for "Through Struggle" was directed by Lex Halaby, who had previously directed videos for Killswitch Engage and Mudvayne." The video was shot at the abandoned meat locker Morell Meats Lot near downtown Los Angeles. In 2019, the band would release a live music video for "Confined," shot as part of their 2018 European headlining tour.

As with prior release Frail Words Collapse, the album's artwork and design were provided by Jacob Bannon.

In promotion of the album, vocalist Tim Lambesis was interviewed at MTV Studios for Headbanger's Ball on June 16, 2006. A "handful" of the band's fans were invited to attend the interview at MTV's studios in New York City.

Bassist Clint Norris, who joined the band in 2003, but was not involved in the song-writing process for either Frail Words Collapse or Shadows Are Security, would depart following the album's release, in November 2006.

On January 26, 2018, the album was re-released on limited-edition vinyl.

Lambesis revealed in a 2022 interview on Chris Garza's podcast that he considers his vocals on the album the weakest of his career, as he tracked them all in one take after leaving them until the final two days of recording.

== Reception ==
Professional ratings
Review scores
Source	Rating
AllMusic	3.5/5 stars
Blabbermouth.net	6.5/10
Cross Rhythms	9/10 stars
Exclaim!	Slightly unfavorable
MusicOMH	4/5 stars
Imperiumi	5/10 stars
Jesus Freak Hideout	2.5/5 stars
Punk News	7/10 stars

Commercially, the album was the band's first to chart on the Billboard 200, debuting (and peaking) at #35 with sales of 33,000. The album would spend 9 weeks on the charts. As of July 29, 2005, the album had sold 82,000 copies. As of January 2006 the album had sold 174,000 copies. As of March 2006, the record had sold 192,000 copies, and as of September 2007, the album had sold 275,000 copies.

Reception to the album was mixed. While some reviewers praised the number of different musical styles the band had blended together, as well as the improved production and contributions of new members, others felt the release was generic Melodic metalcore, lacking experimentation.

AllMusic rated the album at 3 1/2 stars. AllMusic reviewer Wade Kergan commented on the blend of different popular music styles the band had incorporated in the record's sound, including: Nu Metal, Swedish death metal, Thrash metal, and emo, joking that the combination "would lead metal purists to call for an old-fashioned record burning", and adding writing "these are things that shouldn't work on a metal record, but As I Lay Dying have proven here that they can." Kergan called the release one of the strongest of 2005, adding that new additions Sgrosso, Hipa, and Norris had made the band stronger.

Exclaim! reviewer Max Deneau felt the record was an advancement over the "generic" sound of Frail Words Collapse, both in terms of production and sung vocals, he added "failure to provide much experimentation or variation upon the melodic metalcore formula will prevent them from expanding their fan base to the extent that they potentially could". Blabbermouth reviewer Scott Alisoglu praised the album's production, calling the record overall "solid", but indistinguishable from the sound of other metalcore bands like Unearth or Killswitch Engage.

The band were voted "Artist of the Year" at the 15th-annual San Diego Music Awards.

== Track listing ==
All tracks are written by As I Lay Dying.

No.	Title	Length
1.	"Meaning in Tragedy"	3:12
2.	"Confined"	3:10
3.	"Losing Sight"	3:23
4.	"The Darkest Nights"	3:51
5.	"Empty Hearts"	2:48
6.	"Reflection"	3:11
7.	"Repeating Yesterday"	4:02
8.	"Through Struggle"	3:58
9.	"The Truth of My Perception"	3:06
10.	"Control Is Dead"	2:56
11.	"Morning Waits"	3:56
12.	"Illusions"	5:48
Total length:		43:21

Limited edition bonus DVD
No.	Title	Length
1.	"Falling Upon Deaf Ears"
2.	"94 Hours"
3.	"A Thousand Steps"
4.	"Elegy" (written by Kyle Fehr)
5.	"Reflection"
6.	"Distance Is Darkness"
7.	"Collision"

Special edition DVD content
No.	Title	Length
1.	"Behind The Shadows: The Making of Shadows Are Security"
2.	"Confined" (music video)
3.	"Through Struggle" (music video)
4.	"The Darkest Nights" (music video)
5.	"Behind the Scenes featurettes on all three videos"

Notes

- "Illusions" is a re-recording of a song from the As I Lay Dying/American Tragedy split album.

== Personnel ==
Production and performance credits are adapted from the album liner notes.

As I Lay Dying

- Tim Lambesis – unclean vocals, production
- Nick Hipa – guitar, backing vocals
- Phil Sgrosso – guitar, backing vocals, bass, production
- Clint Norris – bass, clean vocals
- Jordan Mancino – drums

Additional musicians

- Daniel Weyandt – additional vocals on "Control Is Dead"
- Jason Moody – additional vocals on "Illusions"
- Matt Mentley – additional vocals on "The Meaning in Tragedy" and "Confined"
- Dave Arthur – clean vocals
- Tommy Garcia – additional vocals

== Charts ==
Chart (2005)	Peak position
UK Independent Albums (OCC)	50
US Billboard 200	35
US Independent Albums (Billboard)	1

== Notes ==
1. CD liner notes contain explanations of each song's lyrics, provided by vocalist Tim Lambesis.
