= Valentina Lisitsa =

Ukrainian classical pianist (born 1970)

Valentina Lisitsa Валентина Лисиця
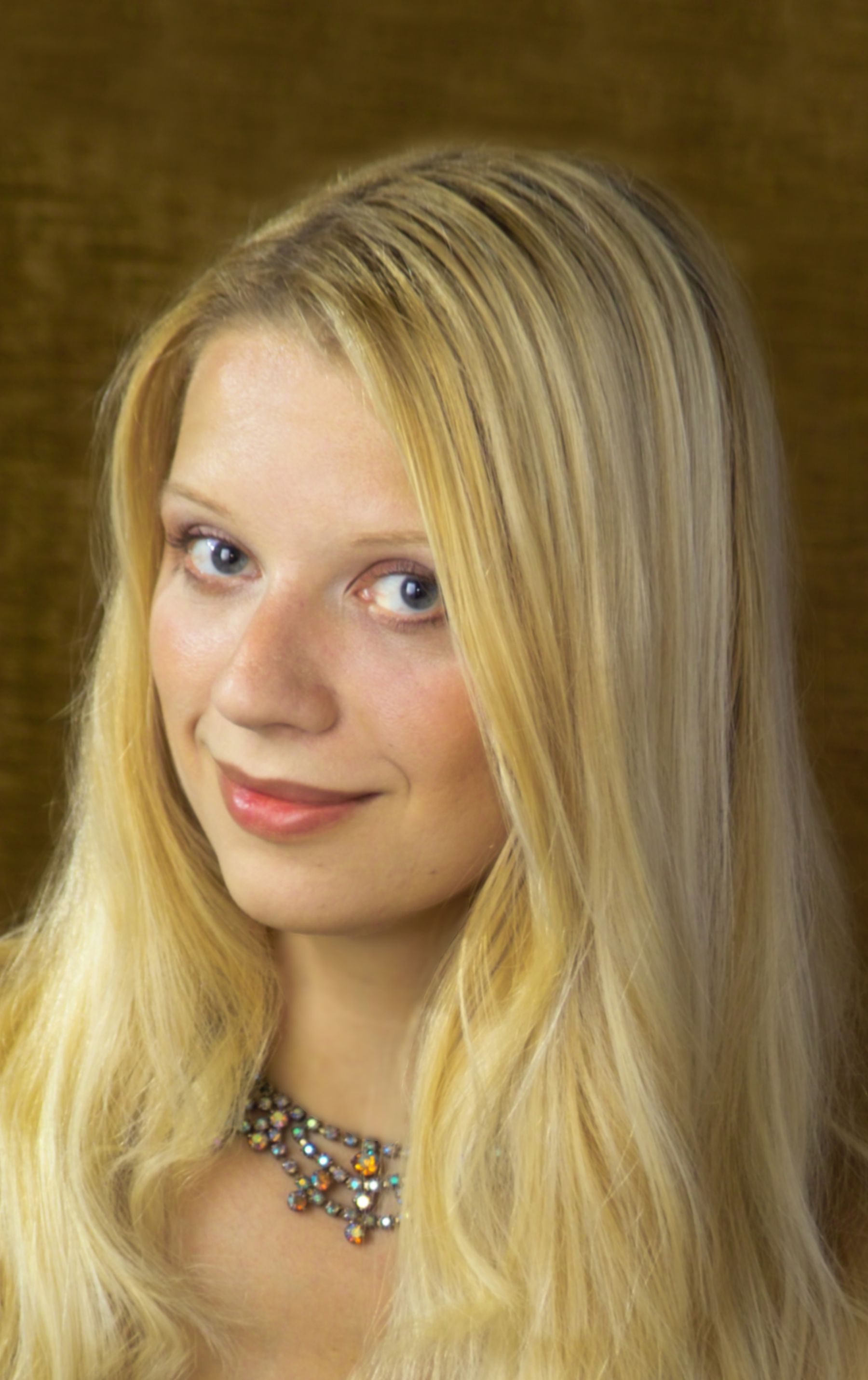
- Lisitsa in 2003

Background information
- Born: 1973 (age 52–53); Kiev, Ukrainian SSR, Soviet Union (now Kyiv, Ukraine)
- Genre: Classical
- Occupation: Classical pianist
- Instrument: Piano
- Years active: 1977–present
- Website: valentinalisitsa.com

YouTube information
- Channel: Valentina Lisitsa QOR Records Official channel
- Years active: 2007–present
- Genre: Classical music
- Subscribers: 749 thousand
- Views: 320 million
- Last updated: 1 May 2026

Valentina Yevhenivna Lisitsa (Note: Ukrainian: Валентина Євгенівна Лисиця, romanized: Valentyna Yevhenivna Lysytsia, IPA: [wɐlenˈtɪnɐ jeu̯ˈɦɛn⁽ʲ⁾iu̯nɐ lɪˈsɪtsʲɐ]; Russian: Валентина Евгеньевна Лисица, romanized: Valentina Yevgenyevna Lisitsa, IPA: [vəlʲɪnʲˈtʲinə jɪvˈɡʲenʲjɪvnə lʲɪˈsʲitsə].) (born 1973) is a Ukrainian and Russian classical concert pianist. Lisitsa independently launched her career on social media, without initially signing with a tour promoter or record company. By 2012, Lisitsa was among the most frequently viewed pianists on YouTube. The Toronto Symphony canceled her 2015 engagements as a soloist with them because of her social media postings in support of pro-Russian separatists during the Russo-Ukrainian War.

== Life and career ==
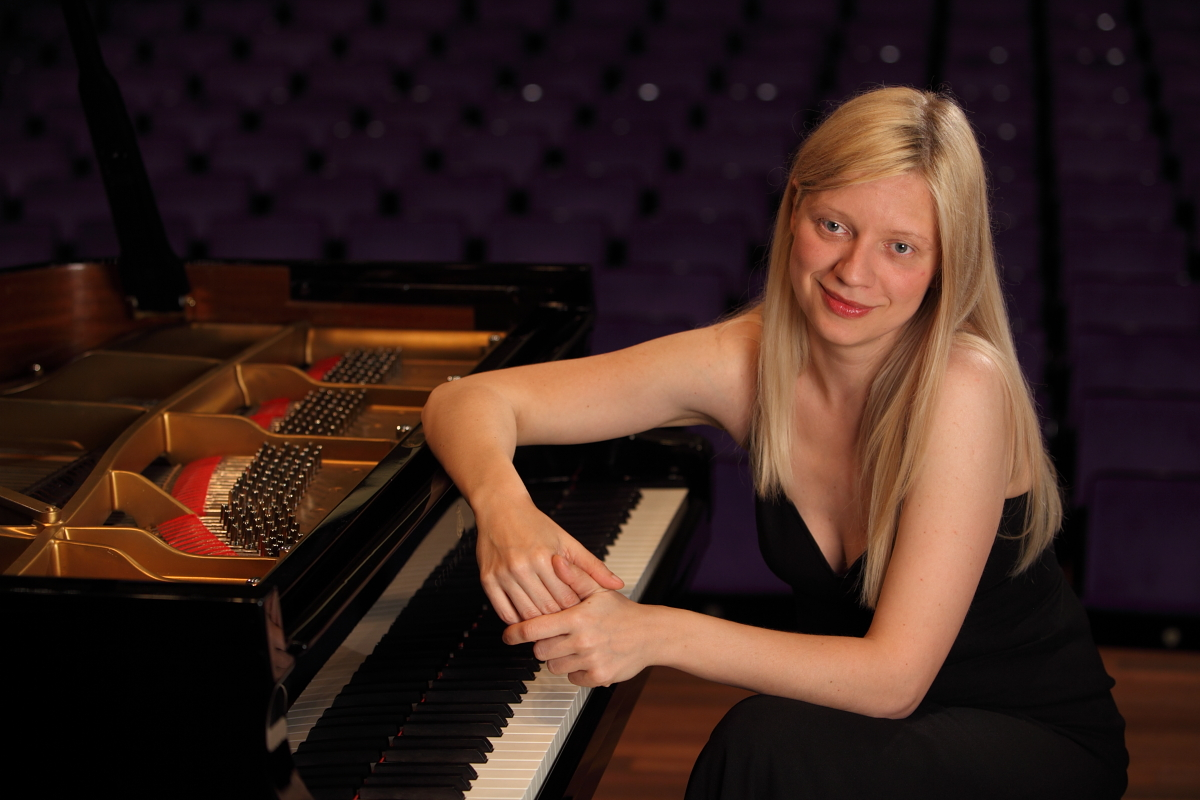
Valentina Lisitsa at the piano in 2010

Lisitsa was born in Kiev, Ukrainian SSR, Soviet Union (now Kyiv, Ukraine). Her mother, also named Valentina, is a seamstress and her father, Evgeny, was an engineer. Her older brother, Eugene, who was also an accomplished pianist, died in 2009.

She started playing the piano at the age of three, performing her first solo recital at the age of four. She is of Russian and Polish descent on her mother's side, while her father is of Ukrainian heritage.

Lisitsa attended the Lysenko music school and, later, the Kyiv Conservatory, where she and her future husband, Alexei Kuznetsoff, studied under Dr. Ludmilla Tsvierko. When Lisitsa met Kuznetsoff, she began to take music more seriously. In 1991, they won the first prize in The Murray Dranoff Two Piano Competition in Miami, Florida. That same year, they moved to the United States to further their careers as concert pianists. In 1992, the couple married. Their New York debut was at the Mostly Mozart Festival at Lincoln Center in 1995.

Lisitsa posted her first YouTube video in 2007. Her set of Chopin etudes reached the number-one slot on Amazon's list of classical video recordings, and became the most-viewed online collection of Chopin etudes on YouTube.

In 2010, Lisitsa told an interviewer, she and her husband put their life savings into recording a CD of Rachmaninoff concertos with the London Symphony Orchestra, in hopes of furthering her career. In the spring of 2012, before her Royal Albert Hall debut, Lisitsa signed with Decca Records, which later released those recordings.

By mid-2012, she had logged nearly 50 million views of her YouTube videos. By mid-2020, her videos reached 200 million views. Her YouTube channel had over 650,000 followers in early 2022. Lisitsa signed a three-year contract with French record label Naïve in 2021.

Lisitsa has performed in Carnegie Hall, David Geffen Hall, Benaroya Hall, Musikverein, Wigmore Hall, the Royal Albert Hall and Bulgaria Hall, where she performed Rachmaninoff's complete piano concertos with Sofia Philharmonic over two evenings. She has posted online recitals and practicing streams. She has also collaborated with violinist Hilary Hahn in recital engagements.

== Political views and activities ==
Lisitsa has expressed her opposition to what she considered Western interference within Ukraine.

Lisitsa performed in front of the former Ukrainian Embassy in Moscow on 2 May 2022, to commemorate victims of the 2014 Trade Unions House fire.

On May 9, 2022 Lisitsa played a concert in Mariupol in commemoration of its annexation by Russia.

=== Twitter controversy ===
In April 2015, a number of scheduled performances at Toronto Symphony Orchestra were canceled due to "provocative" posts that Lisitsa posted on her Twitter account; the orchestra initially did not specify which remarks led to this decision. Lisitsa said that the orchestra threatened her if she spoke about the cancellation. The CEO of Toronto Symphony later provided a seven-page compilation of her tweets that prompted the decision and said that it was "not a free speech issue, but rather an issue of someone practicing very intolerant and offensive expression through Twitter".

The Toronto Star criticised the orchestra's decision in an editorial, writing that, "Lisitsa was not invited to Toronto to discuss her provocative political views. She was scheduled to play the piano. And second, banning a musician for expressing "'opinions that some believe to be offensive shows an utter failure to grasp the concept of free speech." The Ukrainian Weekly has described her postings as "hate speech." In response, Lisitsa commented that "satire and hyperbole [are] the best literary tools to combat the lies". In 2022, Benjamin Ivry wrote in International Piano Magazine that Lisitsa had "parrot[ted] Putin’s propagandistic talking points about Ukraine".

== Discography ==
Lisitsa has recorded for the Audiofon, CiscoMusic, and VAI labels.

Her recording of the four sonatas for violin and piano by composer Charles Ives, made with Hilary Hahn, was released in October 2011 on Deutsche Grammophon label. Her album Valentina Lisitsa Live at the Royal Albert Hall (based on her debut performance at that venue 19 June 2012) was released 2 July 2012.
