= Beneath the Encasing of Ashes =

Studio album by As I Lay Dying
- Released: June 12, 2001
- Recorded: 2000
- Genre: Metalcore
- Length: 29:57
- Label: Pluto
- Producer: Tim Lambesis, Evan White

As I Lay Dying chronology
Beneath the Encasing of Ashes (2001)	As I Lay Dying / American Tragedy (2002)

Beneath the Encasing of Ashes is the debut studio album by American metalcore band As I Lay Dying. Initially released on June 12, 2001, the album was re-released through Metal Blade Records along with songs from the band's split album with American Tragedy on May 16, 2006. It is the band's only record to feature bassist Noah Chase.

== Background ==
As I Lay Dying were originally formed under the name "Life Once Lost;" however the band later opted to change their name after reorganizing in 2000. Lambesis and guitarist Eli Bowser would then join Society's Finest; and bassist Jon Jameson joined Noise Ratchet. Several month's later, Lambesis would move back to San Diego to reform As I Lay Dying. Jordan Mancino had recently left Edge of Mortality and Noah Chase later joined. After releasing a demo, the band signed with Pluto Records.

In a 2010 interview with Indievision Music, Lambesis said the album was one he felt most lyrically connected to, saying that it wasn't "well written by any means, but it reminds me of a condition of my heart that is an important part of my development." In a 2011 interview with Phoenix New Times Jordan Mancino said he believed the album to be the band's "least powerful," though he noted it was a difficult question to answer, as he'd have to say something negative about one of their records. In a 2005 interview with Metal Underground, Lambesis called "Behind Me Lies Another Fallen Soldier" one of his favorite As I Lay Dying songs. The song was re-recorded for the band's second album, Frail Words Collapse. They also re-recorded a medley, which includes parts from several songs from the album, which was included on Decas.

== Critical reception ==
Professional ratings
Review scores
Source	Rating
Allmusic	3.5/5 stars
Jesus Freak Hideout	4/5 stars
MusicEmissions	Positive (unrated) link

Beneath the Encasing of Ashes was well received, with many reviewers (and subsequently Phil Sagroso) comparing the band's sound to that of American metalcore band Zao, though some found the band to be too much of a "Zao clone." AllMusic praised Lambesis' vocals, and considered the band's sound at the time a "blend of heavy metal, hardcore, and grindcore."

== Track listing ==
All tracks are written by As I Lay Dying.

No.	Title	Length
1.	"Beneath the Encasing of Ashes"	3:03
2.	"Torn Within"	1:46
3.	"Forced to Die"	2:43
4.	"A Breath in the Eyes of Eternity"	2:58
5.	"Blood Turned to Tears"	1:38
6.	"The Voices That Betray Me"	2:58
7.	"When This World Fades"	2:32
8.	"A Long March"	1:56
9.	"Surrounded"	0:50
10.	"Refined by Your Embrace"	1:44
11.	"The Innocence Spilled"	3:36
12.	"Behind Me Lies Another Fallen Soldier"	4:13
Total length:		29:57

== Personnel ==
As I Lay Dying

- Tim Lambesis – vocals, keyboards, production
- Evan White – guitars, production
- Noah Chase – bass
- Jordan Mancino – drums

Additional personnel

- Brian Cobbel – executive production
- Eric Shirey – executive production
- Jeff Forest – engineering
- Nolan Brett – mastering
- Darren Paul – design, layout concept
- Brandon Ratchet – drums (7)
- Johnny Utah – additional vocals (11)
