= The Jonbenét =

American noise rock band

- Also known as: Central Park Jogger (2001-2002); Jonbenet (2003-2004)
- Origin: Houston, Texas, U.S.
- Genres: Post-hardcore; noise rock
- Years active: 2001-2002, 2003-2009
- Labels: Pluto; Emerald Moon; Team Science!
- Past members: Dann Miller; Michael Murland; J. Andrew Ireland; Bryan Schutmaat; Wil Spent; Chris Goodwin; Andrew Saleeba; Grant Miller

The Jonbenét was an American noise rock band formed in Houston, Texas in the summer 2003. The group was named after the murdered child JonBenét Ramsey, who was widely publicized during the mid to late nineties.

The band played their first show as Jonbenét on August 22, 2003, and after several self-released EPs and tours in the US and Canada, the band caught the attention of Pluto Records, an independent record label from Texas. The Plot Thickens was released on Pluto Records (2005). It was a re-mastered compilation of material from their self-released EPs and split 7-inch releases.

The band released their first full-length entitled Ugly/Heartless (2006). Emerald Moon Records and Pluto Records worked together on a four part vinyl series and only two were released. On August 10, 2009, the band announced a string of final shows, implying that the band would not continue. The last show was played December 19, 2009, at Walter's in Houston, Texas. The last release was Substances (2009).

== History ==
=== 2001-2003: Early years and formation ===
On December 20, 2003, a 7-song demo was released entitled, Seven Short Stories by Mortimer T. Chimneytot. The demo was recorded by Chris Goodwin, who took the spot of bass player after Grant left to go to school in January 2004.

=== 2004-2005: Five Stories Retold and The Plot Thickens ===
That May, Andrew Saleeba (drums) left the band and Drew Ireland took over on drums. The new members had completely different styles of playing which led to the re-writing of all the old material. Five of the re-arranged songs were hastily self-released on July 1, 2004, Five Stories Retold (pre-release). 100 copies were made and later re-released on August 3.

In April 2005, the band parted ways with bass player Chris Goodwin, and Illinoisan Wil Spent of the Decatur band Secretary moved to Houston and joined the band. He packed his van, drove to Houston and moved in with Dann. As all of this was happening, the band had established contact with Pluto Records, an independent record label from Texas on June 16. Shortly after signing with the label, the band booked another tour with The Kidnap Soundtrack in July 2005. Days after returning, The Plot Thickens was released on July 26 via Pluto Records. It was a re-mastered compilation of the Five Stories Retold EP and their side of the split with The Kidnap Soundtrack. The album was named "Best Heavy Sh*t" by Free Press Houston. The Jonbenét was one of the contenders for Best Hardcore/Screamo Band in the Houston Press Music Awards. The band produced a music video for the track "Behold, The White Whore" on February 10, 2006. In March, Mike Murland injured his ankle and had to cut the tour short. In October, the band would reunite with The Phantom Pains for mini-tour to meet up in Cleveland, OH for a Halloween show with American Werewolves, Integrity, and Turmoil. Exclaim! reviewed The Plot Thickens on December 1, 2005.

=== 2006-2007: Ugly/Heartless and Devil Music Volume 1 ===
In December 2005, the band finished writing their first full-length Ugly/Heartless that released on August 8, 2006. The album was recorded in January 2006 in Houston at Johnny Killed Rock N' Roll Studios. Immediately after recording, the band left for a tour with The Fall of Troy, With All Sincerity and At All Cost. The band toured for a lot of 2006 with bands such as The Number 12 Looks Like You, Fear Before The March Of Flames, HeavyHeavyLowLow, At All Cost, God's Temple Of Family Deliverance, The Fall of Troy, The American Black Lung, Fight Pretty, Blues and Fall River. The group started to make a name for themselves and appeared in Houston Press on July 20, 2006. The band appeared in Decibel Magazine issue #24 in October 2006 and also appeared on SPIN on September 22, 2006. The band did an interview with Deaf Sparrow, where they talk about the band's history and the recording and writing process of their album, they also reviewed the album. The band's name attracted negative attention after John Mark Karr, who was alleged to have killed Ramsey (but was later acquitted), was arrested. The band produced a music video for "Why We're Dead" in fall 2006.

The band appeared on Lollipop Magazine where they reviewed the album on January 5, 2007. On January 15, 2007, it was announced that Emerald Moon Records and Pluto Records were working together to produce a four part 7” vinyl series with The Jonbenét called Devil Music. The first vinyl was released on April 17, 2007. The Stranger reviewed the album on January 18, 2007 where they described it as a "spastic, angular wall of post-hardcore noise". After a short tour with Turmoil, Wil Spent left the band due to complications with diabetes. Bryan Schutmaat has taken over on bass.

=== 2008-2009: Devil Music Volume 2, Substances and disbandment ===
The second 7” vinyl was released sometime in summer 2008.

On August 10, 2009 the band announced a string of final shows, intimating that the band would not continue. And, in fact, the last show was given on December 19, 2009, at Walter's in Houston, Texas.

== Band members ==
- Michael Murland - vocals
- Dann Miller - guitar
- J. Andrew Ireland - drums
- Bryan Schutmaat - bass
- Wil Spent - bass
- Chris Goodwin - bass
- Andrew Saleeba - drums
- Grant Miller - bass

== Discography ==
=== Studio albums ===
- The Plot Thickens (2005)
- Ugly/Heartless (2006)

=== EPs and splits ===
- Five Stories Retold (2004)
- The Kidnap Soundtrack / The Jonbenét split (2005)
- Devil Music Volume 1 (2007)
- Devil Music Volume 2 (2008)
- Substances (2009)
