= At All Cost =

American metalcore band

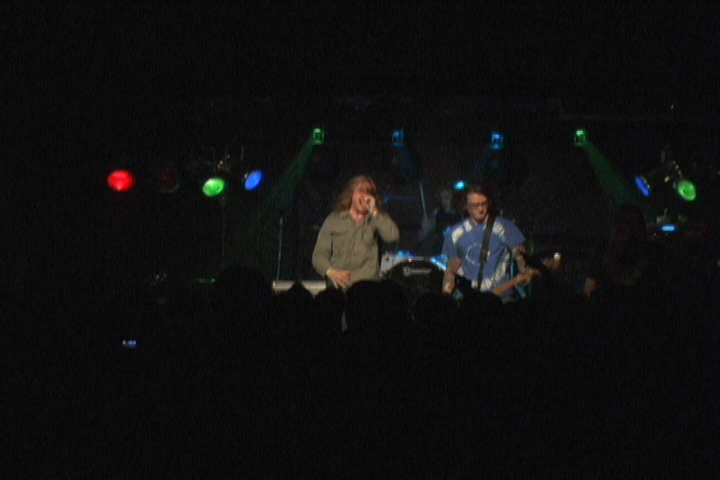
- At All Cost live in Houston in 2006

Background information
- Origin: Austin, Texas, U.S.
- Genres: Metalcore
- Years active: 2003–2009; 2016–present
- Labels: Century Media, Koch, Combat
- Members: Andrew Collins; Trey Ramirez; Michael Carrigan; Bobby Andrews; Oz
- Past members: Grant Anderson; Mike Theobald
- Website: www.facebook.com/atallcostband

At All Cost is an American metalcore band from Austin, Texas.

== History ==
The band was formed in 2003. They self-released the EP What is Left to Inspire? and then released the EP Shattered Dreams and Bourgeois Schemes in 2004 on The Imprint, which was a subsidiary of Fiddler Records. With plans to release a full-length with Fiddler the same year, it, however, fell through as stated at a show in 2005 about how "people were arguing about how much money they were going to make.. We just want to make music." Therefore, posting the album, entitled The Streets Are Alive, online and letting fans download it for free.

A few months later, the band signed to the label Combat Records in 2005 and released the album It's Time to Decide. They released three music videos from the album, with the lead single "Death to Distraction" being played on Headbangers Ball on MTV2. The two other videos were for the songs "Right Now" and "The Irony". The band then signed to Century Media in 2007 and released the album Circle of Demons, with the title track as the lead single. A video was done for it and was played on Headbangers Ball as well.

Throughout these years, the band embarked on national tours with bands such as Norma Jean, Still Remains, The Jonbenet, Dead to Fall, and more. Their music can be described as metalcore, groove metal, or, as coined by their guitarist, Trey Ramirez, once at a show, "epic dance metal". They brought elements of hardcore, metal, and dance music to their songs. Plus, vocalist Andrew Collins uses an auto-tune microphone and keyboard at live shows.

=== Final show and reunion ===
The band played a final show on December 19, 2009, with The Jonbenet at Walters on Washington in Houston, Texas.

On December 21, 2012, at Red 7 in Austin, Texas, At All Cost played their first show back together for the Party, At the End of the World.

In the summer of 2016, At All Cost embarked on a two-week tour throughout the Midwest in support of their EP release Circle of Demos which was self-released on Bandcamp.

== Members ==
- Andrew Collins – vocals, keyboard
- Trey Ramirez – guitar
- Michael Carrigan – guitar
- Bobby Andrews – bass
- Jon Oswald (Oz) – drums
- Eric Joseph Powell – guitar/vocals

== Discography ==
Title	Release date	Label
It's Time to Decide	September 20, 2005	Combat/Koch
Circle of Demons	July 31, 2007	Century Media
