= Frail Words Collapse =

Studio album by As I Lay Dying
- Released: July 1, 2003
- Recorded: February 2003
- Studio: Big Fish Studio
- Genre: Melodic metalcore
- Length: 38:44
- Label: Metal Blade
- Producer: Evan White, Tim Lambesis

As I Lay Dying chronology
As I Lay Dying / American Tragedy (2002)	Frail Words Collapse (2003)	Shadows Are Security (2005)

Singles from Frail Words Collapse
- 1. "94 Hours" Released: April 30, 2003; 2. "Forever" Released: April 30, 2003

Frail Words Collapse is the second studio album by American metalcore band As I Lay Dying. The album is their first release on the record label Metal Blade Records. This is also the last album to feature Evan White before his departure from the band shortly after the album's release and the only album to feature Jasun Krebs as the second guitarist. The album features the band's signature song "Forever". As of April 2005, the album has sold over 118,000 copies in the United States, according to figures from Nielsen SoundScan. In 2020, Loudwire named the album one of the top-25 best metalcore albums of all time.

== Background ==
On January 20, 2003, As I Lay Dying announced via the band's website (then hosted by the independent record label Pluto Records to which they were signed) that recording for their upcoming LP would begin on February 9. Due to studio scheduling conflicts, the start of recording was delayed until February 21.

After consistent touring, on March 4, 2003, As I Lay Dying announced they'd signed with Metal Blade Records, and that they were recording their new full-length album set for a June release, titled "Frail Words Collapse." The band shared on March 15 that they had finished recording, and that the mastering process had begun. At the end of April, the band announced the release date for "Frail Words Collapse" was set for July 1, 2003.

On April 30, the band posted two singles to the now-defunct website mp3.com, where "94 Hours" became the top-downloaded and top-streamed metal track.

In May, the band toured with The Death Campaign in promotion of the album. Following the record's release the band would tour heavily over the remainder of 2003 and throughout 2004 in support of the album, touring North America with Haste in late 2003, with Every Time I Die, The Black Dahlia Murder, and Scarlet in spring 2004, as well as In Flames and Killswitch Engage in spring 2004, with Himsa, Shadows Fall, and Remembering Never in Summer 2004, and Europe in late 2004 with Lamb of God and Throwdown.

An "unofficial" music video for the track "Forever" was released on March 11, 2004, via MentalSuplex Productions. MentalSuplex Productions was also involved in the filming of the official "Forever" music video, filmed on April 15 at Soma in San Diego. The "official" "Forever" video was directed by Derek Dale. A music video for the track "94 Hours" was released in 2005. Again directed by Derek Dale, the video was produced by Ray Blanco, both of Generator Productions.

In a 2005 interview with Metal Underground, Lambesis called the song "94 Hours" his favorite song to play live, noting it was emblematic of the sound the band was going for. He additionally called "Behind Me Lies Another Fallen Soldier" one of his favorite As I Lay Dying songs.

Frail Words Collapse features several re-recorded songs from the band's earlier releases, including the songs "Forever", "The Beginning" and "The Pain of Separation" from the split album As I Lay Dying / American Tragedy, as well as a re-recording of the song "Behind Me Lies Another Fallen Soldier," which appeared on the band's debut studio album Beneath the Encasing of Ashes.

The album's artwork and layout were provided by Jacob Bannon, who would go on to provide artwork for the band's next three full-length releases.

The album has sold 250,000 copies according to Nielsen SoundScan.

The album's title is derived from a lyric in the song "Falling Upon Deaf Ears."

On January 26, 2018, the album was re-issued on limited-edition vinyl by Metal Blade Records, alongside Shadows Are Security.

== Critical reception and legacy ==
Professional ratings
Review scores
Source	Rating
AllMusic	3/5 stars
Exclaim!	Highly favorable
HM Magazine	Highly favorable
Jesus Freak Hideout	4/5 stars
Imperiumi	6.5/10 stars
Lambgoat	7/10 stars
PunkNews.org	4.5/5 stars

Commercially, the album was As I Lay Dying's first to chart, peaking at No. 30 on Billboard's Independent Albums chart and No. 41 on the Top Heatseekers chart. As of April 2005, the album has sold over 118,000 copies in the United States, according to figures from Nielsen SoundScan. As of January 2008, the album had sold over 210,000 copies.

The album was favorably-received by critics: receiving praise for the incorporation of the Swedish-influenced gothenburg sound, elements from different genres like emo clean-voice choruses, and passages of Converge-influenced technicality. Other reviewers, however, took umbrage with the album's production, and others noted the album did little to advance the genre.

William York, reviewing for Allmusic, stated that the record "doesn't really add anything new to the mix from a musical standpoint," but also praised it for being "solid enough and well executed" with "adequate" production. Exclaim! reviewer Greg Pratt reviewed the album as "Highly favorable," praising Lambesis' vocal range, and referring to the album as "excellent for a genre overpopulated with total rubbish."

HM Magazine praised the band's new release, stating "Few bands bringing the nu-hardcore sound into their music have done it this well. As I Lay Dying have delivered when it mattered most," adding that the band's evolving sound could be compared to Deftones in addition to Converge.

Lambgoat reviewer Graham Landers praised Metalblade Records for singing a band outside of the traditional metal genre, but found Frail Words Collapse to be overproduced. The review was fairly dismissive of the record, but hopeful for the direction of the band, with Landers concluding "As I Lay Dying are just enough of what I like in metalcore to keep me interested and eagerly awaiting their next move. With a more live-sounding recording, these guys could easily have what it takes to write a stellar record. Although not found within these twelve tracks, I have high hopes for this band and look forward to our next meeting, be it a new album or live show." Landers defined the band's sound on the album as "Hopesfall and Killswitch Engage collaborating (minus the clean singing) on a record with some metal session musicians."

The album's legacy is positive; in 2012 Loudwire named the song "Forever" as the 30th-best metal song of the 21st century. In 2020, Loudwire listed "Frail Words Collapse" at number 10 on its list of the 25 best metalcore albums of all-time, stating "As I Lay Dying’s 'Frail Words Collapse' is a landmark album for metalcore and heavy music. Combining riffs a la At the Gates with sung elements from the likes of Poison the Well into a potent mixture, the band laid the groundwork for future inspiration to other groups."

== Track listing ==
All tracks are written by As I Lay Dying.

No.	Title	Writer(s)	Re-recorded version, originally appeared on:	Length
1.	"94 Hours"			3:11
2.	"Falling Upon Deaf Ears"			2:31
3.	"Forever"		As I Lay Dying/American Tragedy	4:43
4.	"Collision"			3:11
5.	"Distance Is Darkness"			2:39
6.	"Behind Me Lies Another Fallen Soldier"	As I Lay Dying, Jon Jameson	Beneath the Encasing of Ashes	3:03
7.	"Undefined"			2:17
8.	"A Thousand Steps"			1:46
9.	"The Beginning"	As I Lay Dying, Tommy Garcia	As I Lay Dying/American Tragedy	3:29
10.	"Song 10"			4:16
11.	"The Pain of Separation"		As I Lay Dying/American Tragedy	2:57
12.	"Elegy"			4:47
Total length:				38:44

== Personnel ==
Production and performance credits are adapted from the album liner notes.

As I Lay Dying

- Tim Lambesis – vocals, keyboards, production
- Evan White – guitars, bass, production
- Jasun Krebs – guitars
- Jordan Mancino – drums
- Aaron Kennedy – bass (credited, but does not perform)

Additional musicians

- Dylan Plymale – guitars
- Tommy Garcia – backing vocals on "94 Hours"
- Johnny Upton – clean vocals on "Forever"
- Jarrod Taylor – clean vocals on "Distance Is Darkness"

Additional personnel

- Steve Russell – engineering, mixing
- Dan de la Isla – assistant engineering, mixing
- Brad Vance – mastering
- Brandon O'Connell – pre-production
- Jacob Bannon – artwork

== Charts ==
Chart (2003)	Peak position
US Independent Albums (Billboard)	30
US Heatseekers Albums (Billboard)	41
