= Pluto Records =

American record label

Pluto Records is a record label started in 1999 by Eric Shirey and Brian Cobbel. Since 2002, it has been owned and operated by Brian Cobbel and based near Dallas, TX. It is primarily known for punk, metal and hardcore releases, although not exclusively. The label has been home and launching pad to such bands as Grammy-nominated metal act As I Lay Dying, HORSE the band, Luti-Kriss (Norma Jean), Society's Finest and more. Pluto Records is currently a member of the Warner Music Group division of East West Records.

== History ==
As I Lay Dying released their debut album, Beneath the Encasing of Ashes on Pluto Records in 2001 and also a split album with the band American Tragedy in 2002. They are now on Metal Blade Records where they have released additional albums, 2003's Frail Words Collapse, 2005's Shadows Are Security, 2007's An Ocean Between Us and The Powerless Rise in 2010. Their releases on Pluto have also been compiled and re-released by Metal Blade Records in 2006 as A Long March: The First Recordings. As I Lay Dying has gone on to sell over half a million records worldwide, and were nominated for a Grammy Award in 2008 for Best Metal Performance.

== Current band list ==
- Imperial
- My America Is Watching Tigers Die
- Spark is a Diamond

== Former bands ==
- As I Lay Dying
- Evelynn
- Horse the band
- The Jonbenet
- Life in Pictures
- Luti-Kriss/Norma Jean
- Mindrage
- Nailed Promise
- Society's Finest
- Travail

== See also ==
- List of record labels
