= Horse the Band =

American metalcore band

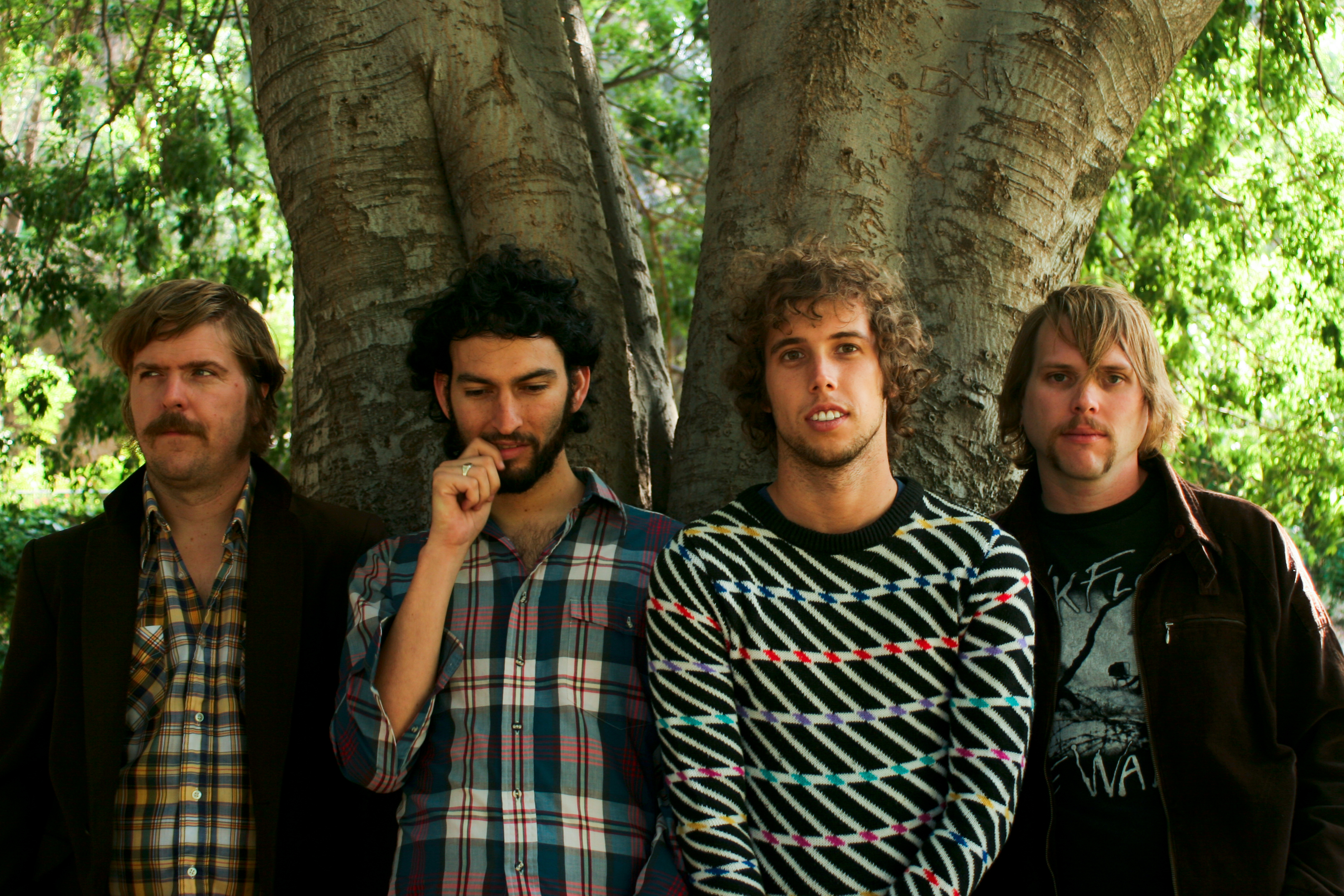
- Horse the Band in 2009. From left to right: Nathan Winneke, David Isen, Erik Engstrom, Daniel Pouliot.

Background information
- Origin: Lake Forest, California, U.S.
- Genres: Metalcore; Nintendocore; chiptune; hardcore punk
- Years active: 1998–2011, 2017–2020, 2024–present
- Labels: Combat, Koch, Pluto, LIF, Vagrant, Roadrunner
- Members: Erik Engstrom; David Isen; Nathan Winneke; Daniel Pouliot; Jeremiah Bignell; Ed Edge
- Past members: Jason Karuza; Risto Metso; Jason Roberts; Adam Crook; Guy Morgenshtern; Andy Stokes; Eli Green; Dashiel Arkenstone; Chris Prophet
- Website: www.horsetheband.com

Horse the Band (stylized as HORSE the band) is an American metalcore band from Lake Forest, California, who are best known for their 8-bit video game-influenced sound combined with metalcore. Frontman Nathan Winneke once jokingly described their sound as "Nintendocore", although the band have gone to lengths to distance themselves from the label, reiterating that this merely describes the sound, not the substance.

== Biography ==
=== Early years and R. Borlax (1998–2004) ===
HORSE the Band was started in Lake Forest, California, in 1998 while founding members Erik Engstrom and David Isen were seniors at El Toro High School and was originally planned as a ska and pop punk band. The original lineup included vocalists Adam Crook and Risto Metso, drummer Jason Karuza and bassist Jason Roberts. At the time, the band had a more traditional hardcore punk style. From late 2000 onwards, the band had a stable lineup with Engstrom and Isen, vocalist Adam Crook, drummer Jason Karuza and bassist Nathan Winneke, who had previously stood in as drummer for Karuza, and recorded their self-produced album Secret Rhythm of the Universe in 2001.

The band booked its own tours starting the summer of 2002, including a three-month tour spanning seven countries, and also released the EP Beautiful Songs by Men. In late 2002, vocalist Adam Crook left the band so that he could continue his formal education. Following his departure, bassist Nathan Winneke took over vocal duties, while Andy Stokes replaced him on bass.

In 2003, HORSE the Band released their first "proper" album with R. Borlax, featuring many new recordings of older songs. Drummer Jason Karuza left the band shortly after its release. His full-time replacement, Eli Green, joined after the band had toured in support of the album.

=== The Mechanical Hand and A Natural Death (2004–2008) ===
In the summer of 2004, they embarked upon the Horse the World Tour 2004, giving way to 85 shows in 90 days, spanning seven countries throughout North America and Europe. After the tour, Andy Stokes left the band, and Dashiel Arkenstone became the band's new bassist. With the new lineup of Engstrom, Isen, Winneke, Green, and Arkenstone, the band recorded and released their second album The Mechanical Hand (2005).

In 2006, the band embarked on both Warped Tour and Sounds of the Underground. The band abruptly dropped off the "Stampeding Machines" tour with Gatsby's American Dream and Portugal. the Man and recorded a concept EP titled Pizza. The band stated on their Myspace that "We left that tour because we ate really, really, really good pizza in Lou Malnati's in Chicago with Dave's grandparents. The pizza was such that we were inspired by God to write music of the kind not heard in this world since Mozart was fed his first currywurst," though astute fans noticed that Eli Green was no longer in the band, having been replaced by Chris Prophet. The band released their fourth album A Natural Death in 2007.

=== Earth Tour and Desperate Living (2008–2010) ===
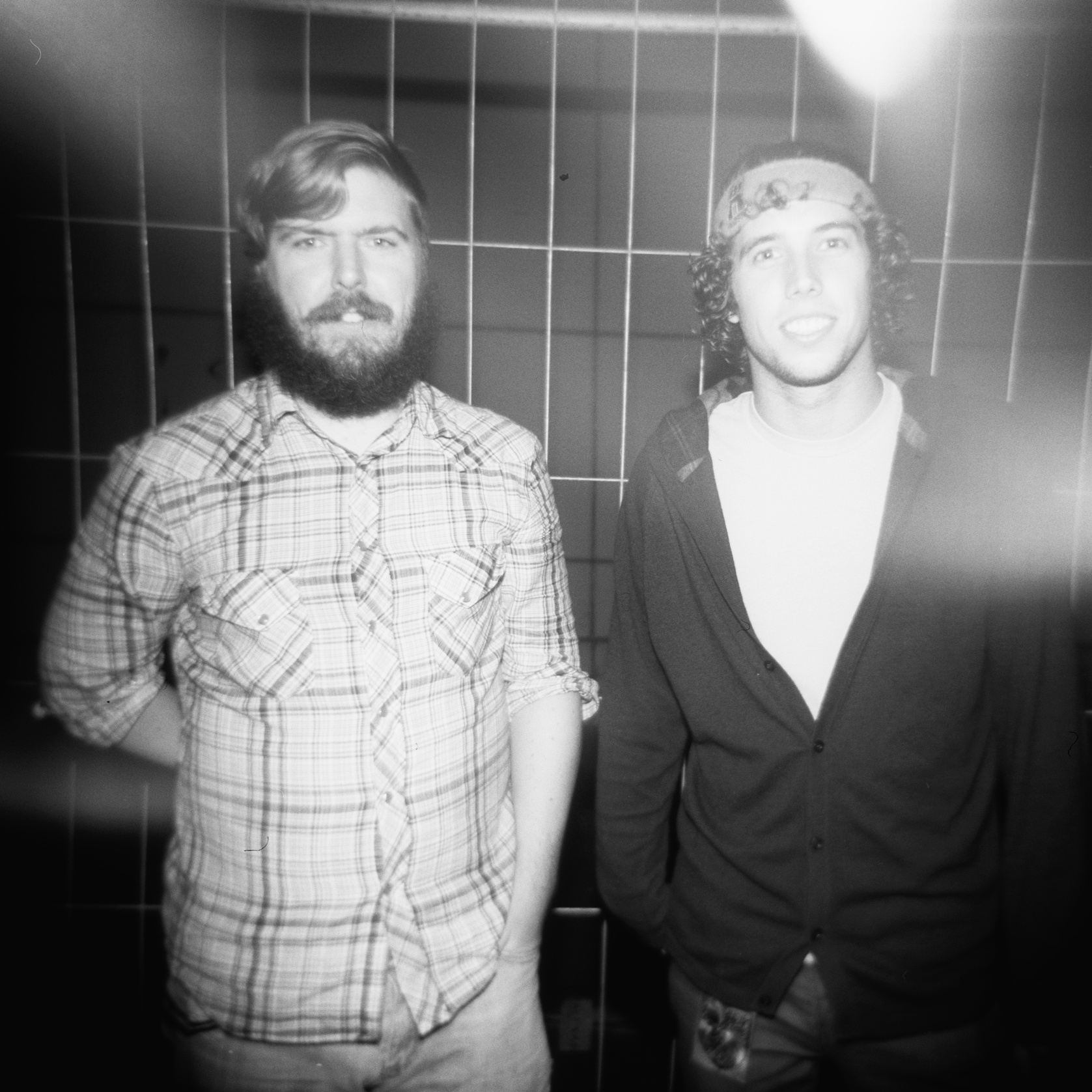
Vocalist Nathan Winneke (left) and keyboardist Erik Engstrom in 2008

In early 2008, Prophet was asked to leave the band. In March, the band embarked on their "Earth Tour", a self-funded, self-booked, and self-promoted tour of 47 countries in 90 days. The band was able to complete the tour with the help of drummer Jon Karel from The Number 12 Looks Like You. The band released a ten-hour, seven-DVD film chronicling their travels in 2010. The film was submitted to SXSW and Sundance but was not screened, and was later released for free online. Bassist Dashiel Arkenstone amicably left the band after the tour, citing the difficulty of the band's lifestyle and tour schedule. Drummer Jon Karel, having been hired as a substitute, returned to his activities in The Number 12 Looks Like You, leaving only Engstrom, Isen and Winneke.

On February 2, 2009, HORSE the Band signed to Vagrant Records, a label they stated they had been trying to sign with for nine years. The band's most recent full-length album, Desperate Living, was released on October 6, 2009, with new drummer Daniel Pouliot and bassist Brian Grover. Grover left the band after touring in support of Desperate Living and was replaced by current bassist Jeremiah Bignell.

=== Hiatus (2011–2017) ===
The band went on an extended unannounced hiatus, reforming every few months for sporadic runs of shows. In March 2017, HORSE the Band toured with Infinity Shred and Graf Orlock, closing out their sets with their first new song in eight years. The song was referred to by fans as "A Reason to Live" after a recurring hashtag on the band's social media during the tour. After wrapping up the tour, on July 14, 2017, the band posted an in-studio video of the song on their Instagram account, followed by two more studio videos, indicating that the group could be possibly recording a new release, which would be their first material in a decade (following 2009's Desperate Living).

=== Your Fault and Nathan Winneke's diagnosis (2018-present) ===
In February 2018, the band announced a new EP on their Facebook and Instagram accounts. The EP, also referred to by fans as "A Reason to Live", was to be crowdfunded by Ethereum smart contract, which would disburse Ether cryptocurrency to the band members as payment for making progress on the album. The band and their social media presence then returned to their previous period of inactivity - issues with funding via Ether cryptocurrency were likely exacerbated by the 2018 cryptocurrency crash shortly after the band announced the campaign.

In December 2019, the band announced three shows on the "A Partridge" Tour, during which they played "A Reason to Live" and another new song, later identified as "NoGimbus". Winneke stated on his Instagram that the new EP was in the process of being mixed and mastered, but no further details were released by the band or its members.

In October 2020, after being teased on the band members' personal Instagram pages, a new three-song EP, Your Fault, was announced on the band's Instagram and other social media profiles for release on November 27. It is the band's first new release in over a decade and contains the two songs played on tour, "A Reason to Live" and "NoGimbus", as well as a cover of Nine Inch Nails' "March of the Pigs". As the value of Ethereum was approaching an all-time high at the time the 2018 smart contract paid out, the band declared that they had been "made rich" by the completion of the album. The co-developers announced that the smart contract had been fully funded in 2018 and the band was paid roughly $8,300.

The band went on another hiatus until November 2024, when they announced a 20th anniversary tour for their 2005 album The Mechanical Hand.

In February 2026, the band announced that they will be supporting Dance Gavin Dance on their tour in June. In March, vocalist Nathan Winneke was diagnosed with multiple sclerosis and has started a GoFundMe to help cover treatments.

== Members ==
Current

- Erik Engstrom – keyboards, LSDJ, synthesizers, samples, backing vocals (1998–present), guitar (2000–2001)
- David Isen – guitars, backing vocals (1998–present)
- Nathan Winneke – lead vocals (2002–present), bass (2000–2002), drums (2000–2001)
- Daniel Pouliot – drums (2008–present), bass (2004)
- Jeremiah Bignell – bass (2010–present)
- Ed Edge – triangle (2005–present)

Touring musicians

- Mike Benitez – bass (2002)
- Alex Duddy – drums (2004)
- Jon Karel – drums (2008)

Former members

- Adam Crook – lead vocals (1998–2002)
- Risto Metso – vocals (1998–1999, 2000)
- Jason Roberts – bass (1998–1999)
- Guy Morgenshtern – bass (1999–2001)
- Andy Stokes – bass, backing vocals (2002–2004)
- Dashiell Arkenstone – bass (2004–2008)
- Brian Grover – bass (2009–2010)
- Jason Karuza – drums (1998–2000, 2001–2004)
- Eli Green – drums (2004–2006)
- Chris "Baby Horse" Prophet – drums (2006–2008)

Timeline

== Discography ==
=== Studio albums ===
Year	Album	Label
2001	Secret Rhythm of the Universe (demo)	Self-released
2003	R. Borlax	Pluto
2005	The Mechanical Hand	Combat
2007	A Natural Death	Koch
2009	Desperate Living	Vagrant

=== Extended plays ===
Year	Album	Label
1999	Scabies, the Kangarooster, and You	Self-released
2001	I Am a Small Wooden Statue on a Patch of Crabgrass Next to a Dried Up Riverbed	Self-released
2002	Beautiful songs by Men	Self-released
2006	Pizza	Koch
2020	Your Fault	Lif

=== Video albums ===
Year	Album	Label
2004	The Effing 69 World Tour	Self-released
2009	We Flooded It, and There's Yogurt Everywhere: 48 Hours in Ukraine	Lif
2010	Earth Tour	Self-released

=== Music videos ===
- "Bunnies" - R. Borlax
- "A Million Exploding Suns" - The Mechanical Hand
- "Lord Gold Throneroom" - The Mechanical Hand
- "Birdo" - The Mechanical Hand
- "New York City" - A Natural Death
- "Murder" - A Natural Death
- "Shapeshift" - Desperate Living
