= Nintendocore =

Music genre

- Etymology: Nintendo + hardcore (punk)
- Other names: Nintendo rock; nerdcore; video game rock; video game metal; 8-bit metalcore
- Stylistic origins: Chiptune; hardcore punk; video game music; heavy metal; post-hardcore; metalcore; extreme metal
- Cultural origins: Early 2000s, United States
- Typical instruments: Electronic; electric guitar; synthesizer; personal computer; drums

Other topics
- Bands; nerdcore; crunkcore; digital hardcore; geek rock; electronicore

Nintendocore is a broadly defined style of music that most commonly fuses chiptune and video game music with hardcore punk and/or heavy metal. The genre is sometimes considered a direct subgenre of post-hardcore and a fusion genre between metalcore and chiptune.

Practitioners of this style include Horse the Band and Minibosses.

== Characteristics ==
Referred to as the "bastard child of chiptune and metal," Nintendocore frequently features the use of electric guitars, drum kits, and typical rock instrumentation alongside synthesizers, chiptune, 8-bit sounds, and electronically produced beats. Loudwire described the style as "literally sound[ing] like a bunch of scene kids got lost inside a Mario game." The publication categorized it as a subgenre of both hardcore punk and scene music.

It originated primarily from hardcore punk and heavy metal, and subgenres of those styles such as post-hardcore, metalcore, and screamo. Artists in the genre have also incorporated elements of electro, noise, noise rock, and post-rock. Nintendocore groups vary stylistically and come from a wide array of influences. Horse the Band combines metalcore, heavy metal, thrash metal, and post-hardcore with post-rock passages. "The Black Hole" from Horse the Band's third album, The Mechanical Hand, is an example of Nintendocore, featuring screamed vocals, heavy "Nintendo riffs," and "sound effects from numerous games." Math the Band includes electro and dance-punk styles. Minibosses use Kyuss-inspired heavy metal riffing, and The Advantage is associated with styles such as noise rock and post-rock. The Depreciation Guild was an indie band that incorporated 8-bit sounds, video game music, and elements of shoegaze.

Some bands feature singing, such as The Depreciation Guild, whose frontman Kurt Feldman provides "ethereal" and "tender vocals," and The Megas, who write lyrics that mirror video game storylines. Others, such as Horse the Band and Math the Band, add screamed vocals into the mix. But yet other groups are strictly instrumental, such as Minibosses, and The Advantage. While otherwise diverse, all Nintendocore groups "use specific instruments to mimic the sounds of Nintendo games."

== History ==
Horse the Band was an early pioneer of Nintendocore and the originator of the term, which frontman Nathan Winneke coined as a joke. According to The A.V. Club, the group's "contorted roars, metal-core hysterics, esoteric video game references, and crusty 8-bit-style synth became inextricably linked to the nebulous genre."

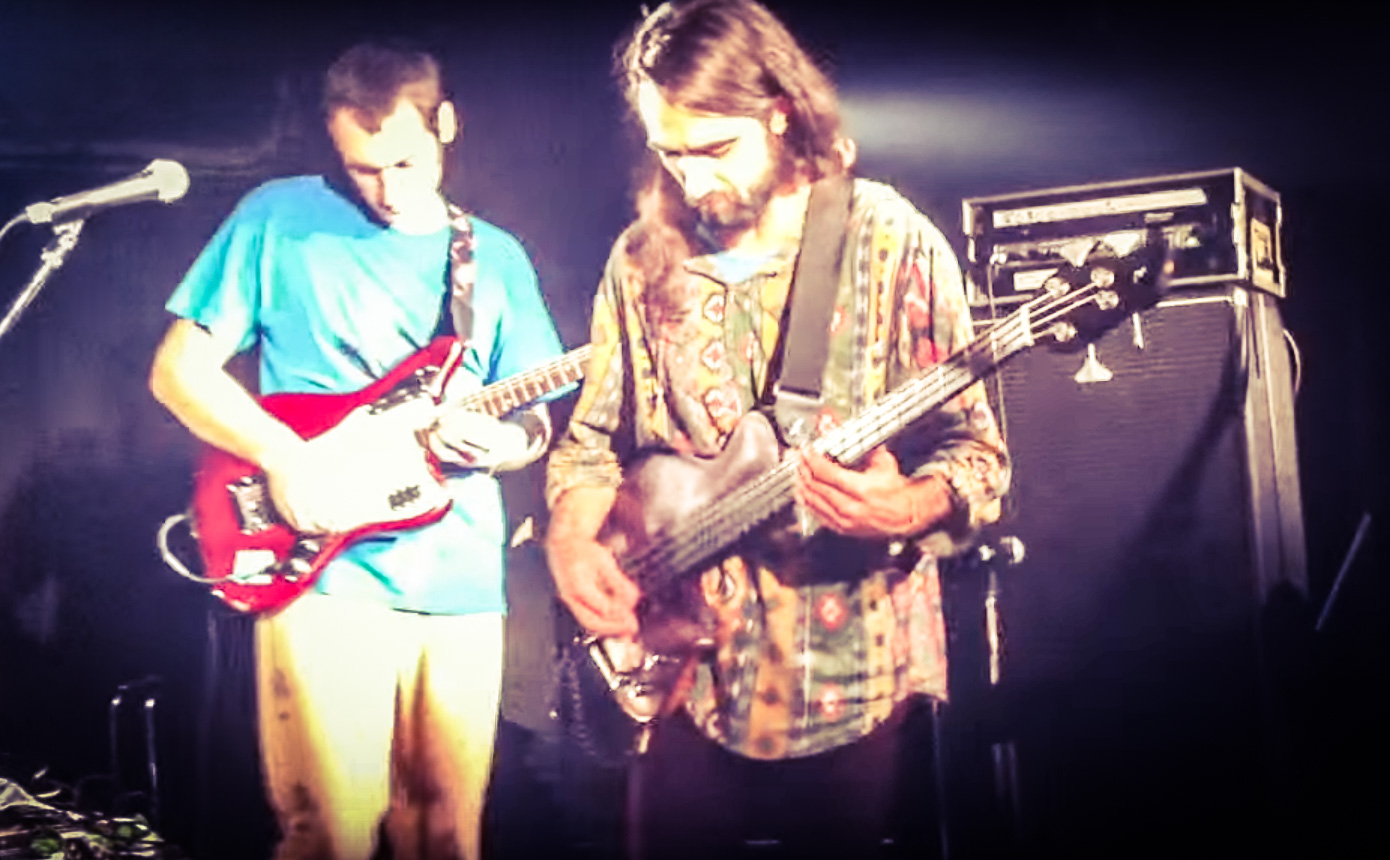
Nintendocore pioneers The Advantage performing in Japan in 2010

Another Nintendocore pioneer is The Advantage, whom The New York Times praises as one of the groups who brought video game music into the mainstream modern music spotlight. The Advantage is an instrumental rock band formed by two students attending Nevada Union High School. Spencer Seim first heard the original two band members play at a 1999 Nevada Union High School talent show, beginning his musical career, and continued to lead the group forward after high school. The group "plays nothing but music from the original Nintendo console games." By creating rock cover versions of video game sound tracks, they have "brought legitimacy to a style of music dubbed Nintendocore."

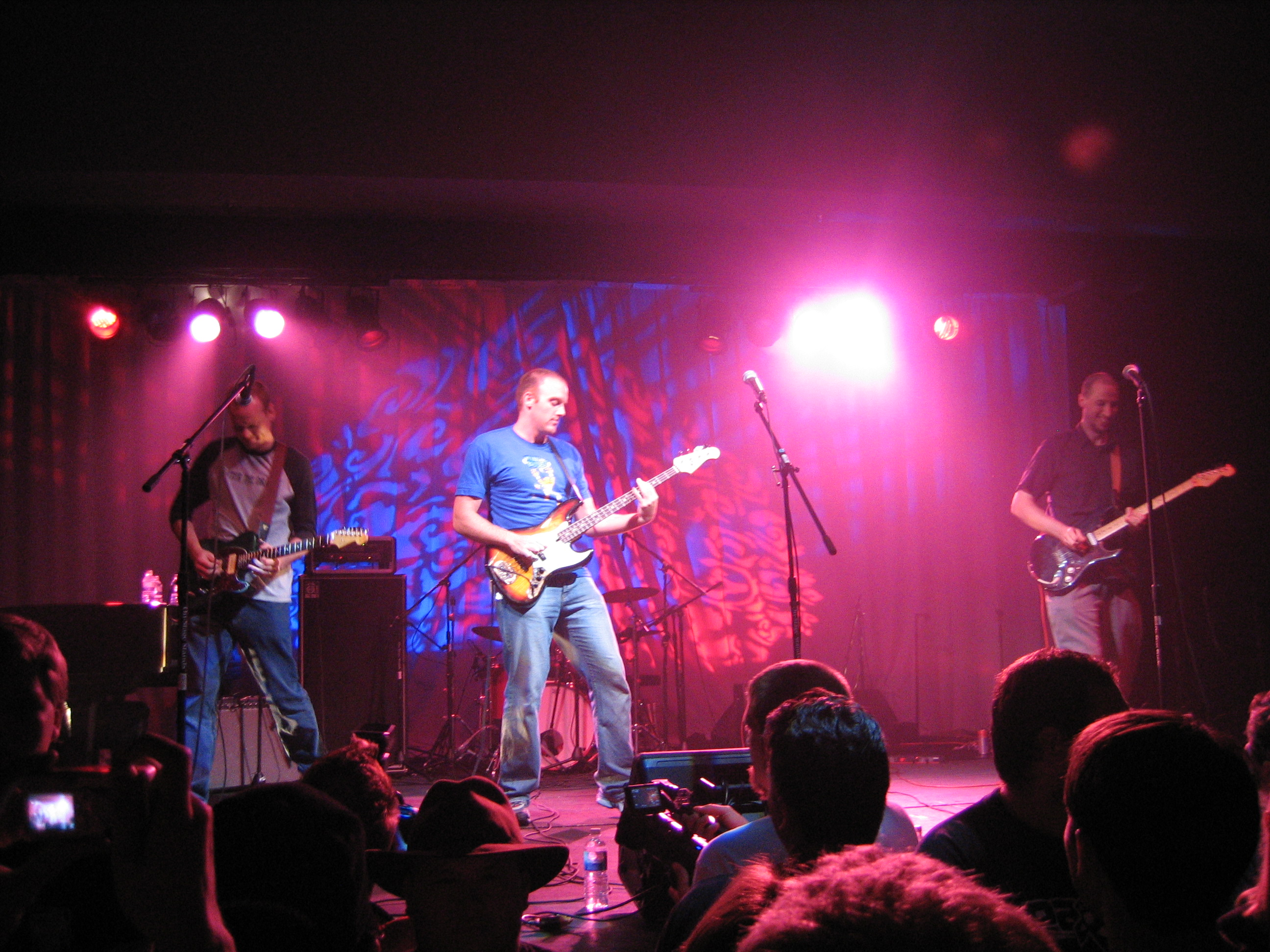
The Minibosses at Penny Arcade Expo 2005 (now PAX)

The Phoenix-based rock group, Minibosses, "[is] one of the most well-established bands in the Nintendocore genre, with an impressive roster of covers including Contra, Double Dragon, Excitebike," and covers of other video game themes. Minibosses is known as one of the primary representatives of Nintendo rock, performing at various video game expositions. In addition to covers, the band has also produced original work. The Harvard Crimson refers to Minibosses as "sworn rivals" of The NESkimos, another Nintendocore practitioner.

The 2007 debut album by The Depreciation Guild, In Her Gentle Jaws, has been referred to as Nintendocore by Pitchfork Media. The website wrote that "In Her Gentle Jaws sticks its neck out further than Nintendocore staples like The Advantage or Minibosses", and that the album's instrumental title track "could plausibly come from an NES cartridge."

In 2016, a group of artists, under the Nintendocore Lives label, released a compilation album, Smash 64, themed after the original Super Smash Bros. game, in an attempt to revitalize the genre.

=== Internet expansion, MySpace, and bedroom production ===
During the mid-to-late 2000s, Nintendocore expanded beyond its early live touring roots and established a dedicated digital subculture through social media platforms, particularly MySpace. As home recording software became more accessible, the genre shifted from traditional full-band live setups toward solo bedroom projects, independent studio producers, and internet-native acts.

Prominent DIY projects during this wave included acts such as Dinotrax, 100DEADRABBITS, and I Shot the Duck Hunt Dog. Musically, these artists emphasized an aggressive 8-bit chip sound design fused with elements of mathcore, cybergrind, and metalcore. Song structures in this era frequently combined hyper-compressed chiptune melodies with erratic drum programming, low-register breakdowns, and sampled dialogue or sound effects taken directly from classic Nintendo Entertainment System (NES) and Game Boy titles.

A key figure during the genre's mid-to-late 2000s digital expansion was musician Pete Bunke ("Peet"). Bunke established the prominent DIY Nintendocore project iamerror (active 2005–2009) releasing relevant albums such as Trout Yogurt (2007). Bunke later continued as a solo artist under the moniker Monomate, releasing Grand Battle in 2010. His work across these projects exemplified the era's shift toward home-studio bedroom production, distributed through internet platforms like MySpace.

To create these tracks without full instrument ensembles, musicians relied on digital tracking software alongside early digital audio workstations like FL Studio and Ableton Live. Distribution was heavily reliant on free digital downloads hosted on file-sharing services (such as MediaFire and Megaupload) and promoted through niche music forums, netlabels, and customized MySpace profile players. Visually and culturally, this digital wave intersected with the broader 2000s scene subculture, characterized by pixel art aesthetics, retro video game iconography, and humorous, pop-culture-referencing song titles.

== See also ==
- List of Nintendocore bands
- Maidcore
