= Captors (album) =

Studio album by Wolves at the Gate
- Released: July 3, 2012
- Genre: Christian metal; post-hardcore; metalcore
- Length: 45:24
- Label: Solid State
- Producer: Andreas Magnusson

Wolves at the Gate chronology
Captors (2012)	VxV (2014)

Captors is the debut studio album by American metalcore band Wolves at the Gate. The album was produced by Andreas Magnusson, and released on July 3, 2012, by Solid State Records. The album attracted both critical and commercial success.

== Reception ==
Professional ratings
Review scores
Source	Rating
AltSounds	70%
Christian Music Zine	4.5/5 stars
Cross Rhythms	9/10 squares
HM	4/5 stars
Indie Vision Music	5/5 stars
Jesus Freak Hideout	4.5/5 stars
Mind Equals Blown	8/10

Captors garnered praise from numerous music critics. At HM, Dan Garcia rated the album four out of five stars, stating that the release "stays consistent and on point without being experimental." Graeme Crawford of Cross Rhythms rated the album nine out of ten squares, writing that the release "is very, very good." At Jesus Freak Hideout, Wayne Myatt rated the album four-and-a-half stars, saying that the release "remains enjoyable from beginning to end." Brody B of Indie Vision Music rated the album a perfect five stars, stating that the release is "fantastic" because it combines "thoughtful lyrics, interesting music, and a sound unlike anything else [he's] [...] heard." At Christian Music Zine, Jake Lipman rated the album four-and-a-half stars out of five, writing that "Not only have they created lyrically one of the most intricate worshipful albums for a heavy band, they've also managed to up their musicianship a couple notches".

Candice Haridimou rated the album a 70-percent, saying that the music is "effortlessly bouncing between clean and unclean parts which when combined, add huge emotional punches into each track here." At Mind Equals Blown, Jarrod Church rated the album an eight out of ten, stating how the inclusion of just a single ballad would have been beneficial says that "there is not a single bad track on the album, every song scoring a par at the very least", which in his estimation "is always a stellar accomplishment." At Seattle Weekly, Joe Williams gave a positive review, writing that the release "grinds between unyielding and beautiful."

== Track listing ==
All tracks are written by Wolves at the Gate

No.	Title	Length
1.	"The Harvest"	3:51
2.	"Awaken"	3:58
3.	"Morning Star"	4:00
4.	"Dead Man"	4:06
5.	"In Your Wake"	3:36
6.	"Slaves"	4:26
7.	"Step Out to the Water"	4:20
8.	"Amnesty"	3:43
9.	"Safeguards"	4:01
10.	"Through the Night"	3:48
11.	"Man of Sorrows"	5:35
Total length:		45:24

== Personnel ==
Wolves at the Gate

- Nick Detty – lead vocals, keyboards
- Jeremy Steckel – lead guitar
- Steven Cobucci – rhythm guitar, clean vocals, additional production
- Ben Summers – bass, backing vocals
- Ben Millhouse – drums

Additional musicians

- Shane Blay (Oh, Sleeper, Wovenwar) – vocals
- Colin Jones – vocals

Additional personnel

- Andreas Magnusson – mixing, production
- Brandon Ebel – executive production
- Troy Glessner – mastering
- Chad Weirick – management
- Adam Skatula – A&R
- Brad Davis – design

== Charts ==
Chart (2012)	Peak position
US Christian Albums (Billboard)	7
US Top Hard Rock Albums (Billboard)	17
