= Triple Brutal =

Studio album by Austrian Death Machine
- Released: April 1, 2014
- Recorded: 2014
- Genre: Thrash metal; metalcore; parody
- Length: 46:27
- Label: Artery
- Producer: Daniel Castleman

Austrian Death Machine chronology
Double Brutal (2009)	Triple Brutal (2014)

Triple Brutal is the third album by the parody metal band Austrian Death Machine. The album feature members of Carnifex, The Faceless, Bleeding Through, and Impending Doom. The album was planned to be released by Metal Blade Records, but the label refused to release the album, so Lambesis signed to Artery Recordings.

== Critical reception ==
Professional ratings
Review scores
Source	Rating
AllMusic	3/5 stars
The Metal Resource	7/10

New Noise Magazine writer Jesse Striewski wrote "...those who enjoy their metal laced with an abundance of quotes from cheesy action flicks should not be let down." Gregory Heaney of AllMusic wrote "Although the schtick can wear a bit thin at times, musically Triple Brutal is a solid album ready-made for the mosh pit, and those looking to get some cathartic metal that doesn't take itself too seriously, or maybe just a little more of The Governator, into their lives won't be disappointed." D.X. Ferris of MetalSucks wrote "Unlike its predecessors, Triple Brutal does not sound like a funny guy and his jovial friends enjoying themselves. Compared to Double Brutal, B3 is grittier, but in a way that seems at odds with the band’s core concept. Regardless of your position on Lambesis, Triple Brutal isn’t going to make you laugh. And if an album full of Schwarzenegger impressions and skits isn’t fun, what’s the point?" John Jackson of The Metal Resource reported "Overall, this is probably the best of the ADM albums from an overall song quality standpoint. Nothing will ever top hearing “Get to the Choppa” for the first time, but from start to finish, Triple Brutal is filled with fast, driving metal that can help anyone who is “looking a little bit like a noodle” get some “gymspiration” to get in “One More Rep”."

== Controversy ==
The album was crowdfunded with several types of deals; one such deal was a workout with frontman Tim Lambesis and to receive a copy of the album. This was prior to Lambesis attempting to hire an undercover police officer as a hitman to murder his wife.

== Track listing ==
No.	Title	Length
1.	"Neah 1, 2"	1:07
2.	"I'll Be Back" (Co-Written by John Boecklin (DevilDriver); Guitar Solo by Wes Hauch (ex-The Faceless, Glass Casket))	2:31
3.	"Chill Out Dickwad" (Guitar Solo by Mark MacDonald (Mercury Switch))	2:54
4.	"Prepare to Be Conquered"	3:13
5.	"One More Rep" (Co-written by JP Gericke (Death By Stereo/Common War); Guest vocals by Jamey Jasta (Hatebreed/Kingdom of Sorrow); Guitar solo by Dan Palmer (Death By Stereo))	2:36
6.	"I Hope That You Leave Enough Room for My Fist" (Co-Written by Jordan Mancino and Josh Gilbert (As I Lay Dying, Wovenwar); Guitar Solo by Chris Storey (ex-All Shall Perish))	3:51
7.	"Pumping and Humping" (Co-written and Guest Vocals by Lorenzo “The Main Event” Antonucci (ex-Sworn Enemy); Guitar solo by Sean Swafford (Aenimus))	2:34
8.	"Crom, Grant Me One Request" (Guitar Solo by Doc Coyle (God Forbid))	4:01
9.	"I Eat Green Berets for Breakfast" (Co-written by JP Gericke (Death By Stereo / Common War))	2:51
10.	"Acting Advice"	0:29
11.	"You Lack Discipline (There Is No Bathroom)" (Co-written by Josh Gilbert (As I Lay Dying))	3:10
12.	"I Know Now Why You Cry" (Co-written by Ryan Glisan (Pyrithion/Allegaeon); Guest vocals by Jon Cooke (Winds of Plague))	4:19
13.	"I Lied" (Co-written by Alexander Dietz (Heaven Shall Burn); Drums by Christian Bass (Heaven Shall Burn))	2:22
14.	"Brutolitics"	0:31
15.	"Get Your Story Straight" (Guest solo by Rusty Cooley; Guest vocals by Scott Lewis (Carnifex))	3:58
16.	"Brutal Recall"	0:35
17.	"I'm Not a Pervert" (Guitar Solo by Jason Suecof (Charred Walls of the Damned))	3:00
18.	"It's Turbo Time" (Guitar Solo by Mark MacDonald (Mercury Switch))	2:25
Total length:		46:27

== Personnel ==
Austrian Death Machine

- Tim Lambesis - Vocals
- Chad Ackerman a.k.a. Ahhhnold - Ahhhnold Vocals

Addition musicians

Vocals

- Jamey Jasta - Vocals (track 5)
- Ash Avildsen - Vocals (track 4)
- Jon Cooke - Vocals (track 12)
- Lorenzo "The Main Event" Antonucci Vocals (track 7), Songwriting (track 7)

Guitars

- Kevin Schwartz - Lead Guitars (track 5)
- Wes Hauch - Lead Guitars (track 2)
- Mark MacDonald - Lead Guitars (tracks 3, 18)
- Chris Storey - Lead Guitars (track 6)
- Dan Palmer - Lead Guitars (track 5)
- Doc Coyle - Lead Guitars (track 8)
- Sean Swafford - Lead Guitars (track 7)
- Jason Suecof - Lead Guitars (track 17)
- James "JP" Gericke - Rhythm Guitars, Bass, Songwriting (tracks 5, 9)

Drums

- Brandon Trahan - Drums (tracks 1–12, 14–18)
- Christian Bass - Drums (track 13)

Production

- Alan Douches - Mastering
- Elmo Arteaga - Assistant Engineering
- Daniel Castleman - Producing, Engineering, Mixing
- John Boecklin - Songwriting (track 2)
- Jordan Mancino - Songwriting (track 6)
- Josh Gilbert - Songwriting (tracks 6, 11)
- Dave Nassie - Songwriting (track 4)
- Alexander Dietz - Songwriting (track 13)
- Ryan Glisan - Songwriting (track 12)
- Ed Repka - Cover art
