= Shane Blay =

American musician

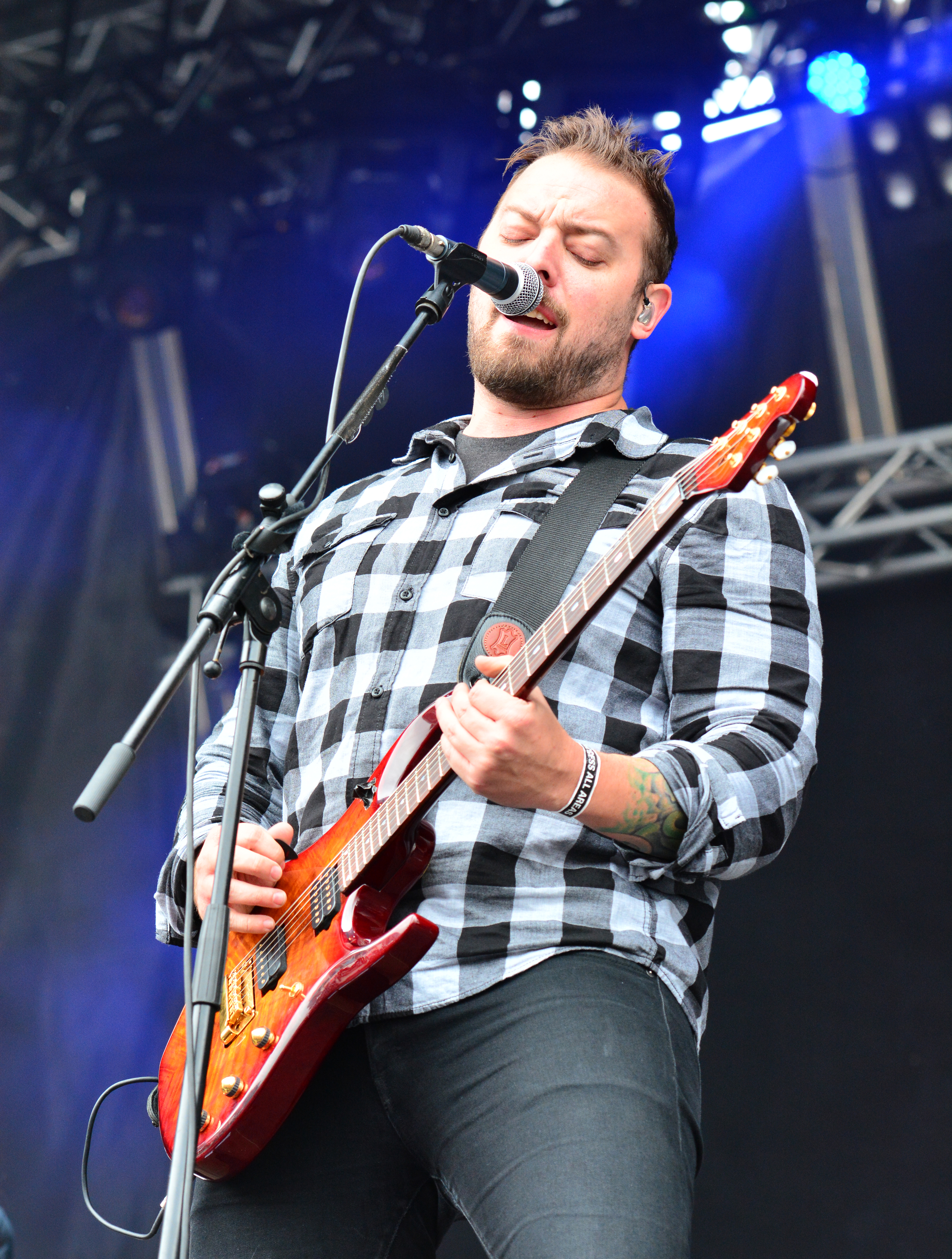
- Blay performing with Wovenwar in 2014

Background information
- Born: Shane Brandon Blay; August 23
- Genres: Metalcore; alternative metal
- Occupation: Musician
- Instruments: Vocals; guitar
- Website: Shane Blay on Facebook

Shane Brandon Blay is an American guitarist and vocalist that performs primarily metalcore. He has performed with bands such as Oh, Sleeper, Between the Buried and Me, and Wovenwar.

== Background ==
Blay started his musical career in the late 1990s/early 2000s, with the band Evelynn. The band released a split EP before hiring on Nick Hipa. Blay knew Hipa since the age of 15. The band was signed to Pluto Records. The band disbanded in 2004 and the members went on their separate ways. Blay alongside Micah Kinard, James Erwin, Lucas Starr, and Ryan Conley formed the band Oh, Sleeper. The band has reached a decent amount of success, but Blay has stated that, contrary to popular belief, the band does not make much money. Blay and Kinard are the only remaining original members on the band. Briefly, Blay joined Between the Buried and Me in February 2004, but departed in September of the same year. In 2013, Tim Lambesis, the vocalist of As I Lay Dying, was arrested, after which the remaining members Hipa, Jordan Mancino, Phil Sgrosso and Josh Gilbert formed a new project called Wovenwar alongside Blay. Blay was the band's first choice for the vocal position. The band has recorded two albums, including Wovenwar (2014) and Honor Is Dead (2016). Blay has made it clear that he will remain in both Wovenwar and Oh, Sleeper.

== Bands ==
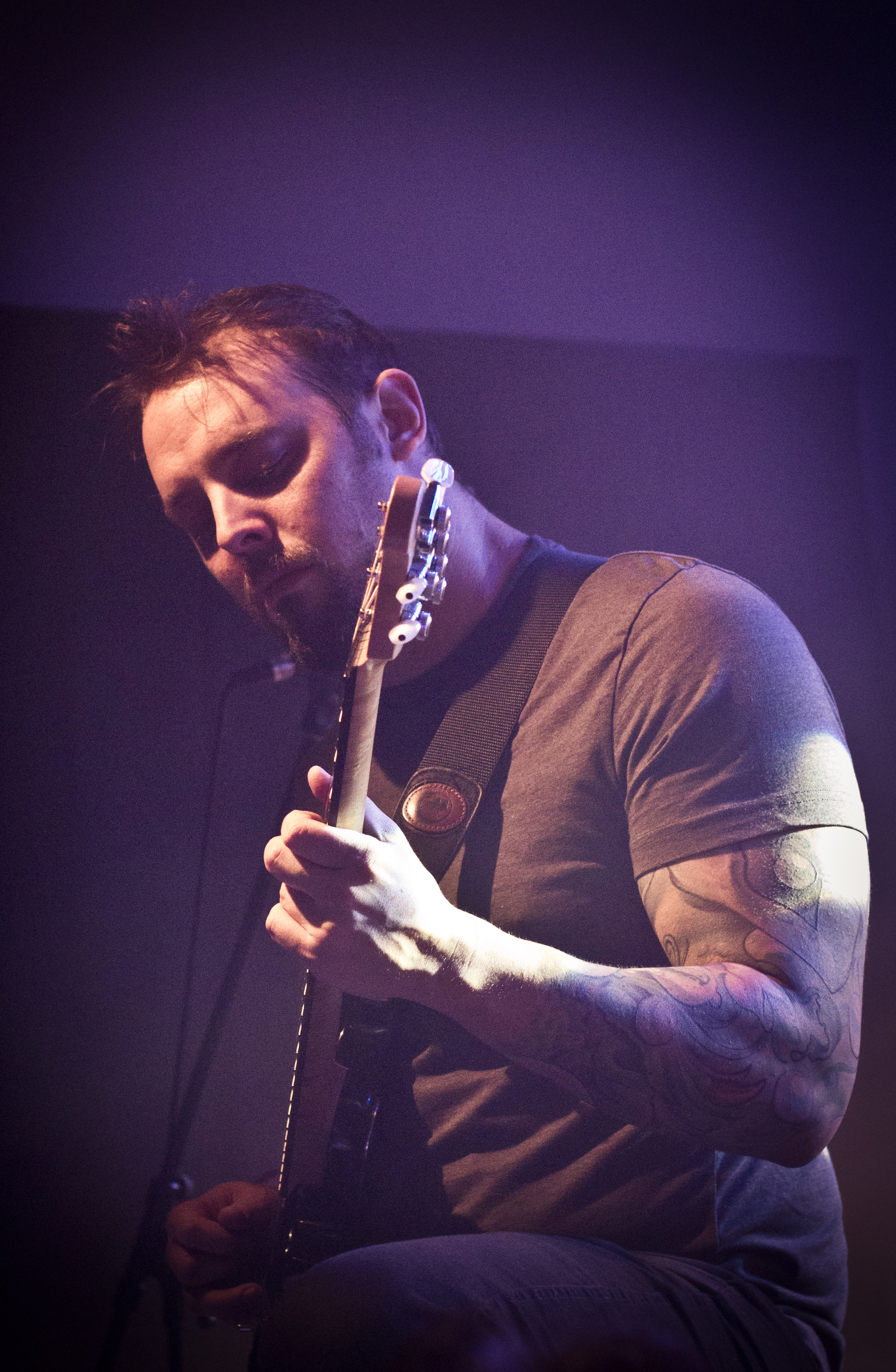
Blay performing with Oh, Sleeper in 2012 at Blast of Eternity

Current

- Oh, Sleeper (2006–present)

Former

- Wovenwar (2013–2018)
- Evelynn (2001–2004)
- Between the Buried and Me (2004)
- Die Trying

== Discography ==
Evelynn

- Dreaming of the Fifth/Evelynn (2001)

Oh, Sleeper

Year	Title	Label	Chart peaks			
Year	Title	Label	US	US Heat	US Rock	US Hard Rock
2007	When I Am God	Solid State	—	19	—	—
2009	Son of the Morning	Solid State	120	7	46	12
2011	Children of Fire	Solid State	142	—	32	1
2019	Bloodied / Unbowed	Solid State	—	—	—	—

EPs

- The Armored March (2006, 1x1)
- The Titan EP (2013, independent)

Wovenwar

- Wovenwar (2014)
- Honor Is Dead (2016)
