= Honor Is Dead =

Studio album by Wovenwar
- Released: October 21, 2016
- Recorded: 2015–2016
- Studio: Rarefield Recordings, San Diego, California; Echelon Studios East, Birmingham, Alabama; Echelon Studios, Burbank, California; Casa de Sgroz, Oceanside, California; The Gnextry Room, Oceanside, California
- Genre: Alternative metal; melodic metalcore
- Length: 38:35
- Label: Metal Blade
- Producer: Wovenwar

Wovenwar chronology
Wovenwar (2014)	Honor Is Dead (2016)

Professional ratings
Review scores
Source	Rating
AllMusic	3.5/5 stars
Distorted Sound	8/10
Metal Injection	7/10
PopMatters	5/10

Honor Is Dead is the second studio album by American heavy metal band Wovenwar. It was released on October 21, 2016, via Metal Blade Records.

The album, unlike its predecessor, was written with contributions from all the five members, while Wovenwar was mostly written before Shane Blay joined the band. Each member recorded their parts individually, rather than being put together in one recording studio, thus drums were recorded at Rarefied Recordings in San Diego, vocal and bass parts recorded at Echelon Studios East in Birmingham, additional vocals recorded at Echelon Studios in Burbank, and guitars recorded at Casa de Sgroz and The Gnextry Room in Oceanside.

In early September 2016, the album's title, track listing and cover art were revealed together with the release date has been set for October 21, 2016. In late September 2016, member Phil Sgrosso announced his exit from the band. The rest of the band embarked on a North American tour with the groups Soilwork, Unearth, Battlecross and Darkness Divided, which lasted from October 14 to November 16, 2016.

Wovenwar would go on an indefinite hiatus following the release of the album. Blay returned to his main band Oh, Sleeper for Bloodied / Unbowed, while the rest of the band reunited with Tim Lambesis for As I Lay Dying's Shaped by Fire.

== Track listing ==
All tracks are written by Wovenwar.

No.	Title	Length
1.	"Confession"	3:53
2.	"Censorship"	3:54
3.	"Honor Is Dead"	4:01
4.	"Lines in the Sand"	3:51
5.	"World on Fire"	3:17
6.	"Compass"	3:37
7.	"Stones Thrown"	3:17
8.	"Cascade"	3:26
9.	"Silhouette"	3:04
10.	"Bloodletter"	3:42
11.	"130"	2:33
Total length:		38:35

Bonus track
No.	Title	Length
12.	"Ruined Ends" (Remix)

Bonus DVD
No.	Title	Length
13.	"Live at Palladium Cologne, 2014/10/31"
14.	"Archers" (Video)
15.	"Death to Rights" (Video)
16.	"All Rise" (Video)

== Personnel ==
- Wovenwar – songwriters, producers
  - Shane Blay – vocals, guitars, engineering (vocals, guitars, bass)
  - Nick Hipa – guitars, engineering (guitars)
  - Phil Sgrosso – guitars, engineering (guitars)
  - Josh Gilbert – vocals, bass, engineering (vocals, bass)
  - Jordan Mancino – drums
- Luis Descartes – backing vocals
- Alex Ballew – backing vocals
- Ian Eubanks – backing vocals
- Mike Levine – backing vocals
- Jesse Cash – backing vocals
- Joseph McQueen – mixing, engineering (additional vocals, drums)
- Adam "Nolly" Getgood – mixing
- George Lever – mixing
- Daniel Castleman – drum tracking assistance
- Chris Gehringer – mastering
- Ryan Clark – art direction, design
- Jeremiah Scott – photography

== Charts ==
Chart (2016)	Peak position
German Albums (Offizielle Top 100)	79
