= Nick Hipa =

American guitarist

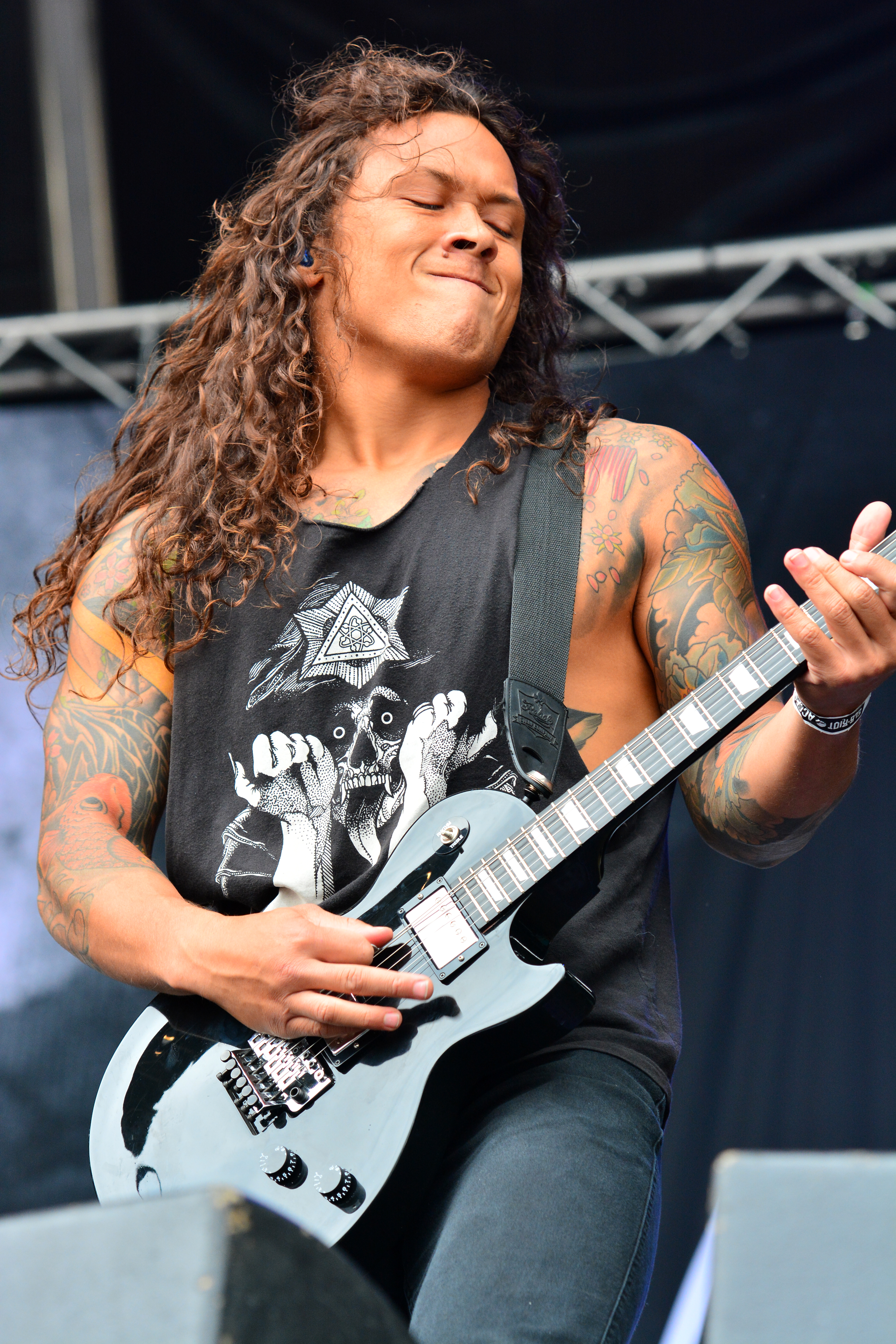
- Nick Hipa performing with Wovenwar in 2014

Background information
- Born: Samuel Nicholas Hipa; November 30, 1982 (age 43)
- Genres: Metalcore; alternative metal; hard rock; Christian metal; melodic metalcore
- Occupation: Musician
- Instrument: Guitar
- Years active: 1996–present
- Member of: Wovenwar; Mire
- Formerly of: As I Lay Dying; Evelynn

Samuel Nicholas Hipa (born November 30, 1982) is an American musician. He is the current lead guitarist of Mire, lead guitarist of Wovenwar, and was the longtime former lead guitarist of As I Lay Dying. He has also been touring rhythm guitarist for God Forbid since 2022.

== Background ==
Hipa started his musical career with the band Evelynn. The band was signed to Pluto Records. In 2001, Evelynn toured with As I Lay Dying. As Evelynn started to disperse, Hipa joined As I Lay Dying in 2003.

As I Lay Dying ran its course with the same lineup since 2007, up until Tim Lambesis' arrest, when Hipa, Phil Sgrosso, and Josh Gilbert departed from the band. Alongside AILD drummer Jordan Mancino and Oh, Sleeper and Hipa's former band-mate, Shane Blay, the group of friends formed Wovenwar.

In a more recent interview, Mancino stated that AILD is still technically five members, himself, Lambesis, Hipa, Gilbert, and Sgrosso. Hipa performed lead guitars for Wovenwar, appearing on both Wovenwar (2014) and Honor Is Dead (2016) to date. In 2017, Lambesis reformed As I Lay Dying, with all new members, stating that none of the previous members, Hipa included, would return. Nevertheless, on June 8, 2018, it was confirmed that Hipa along with the "classic" lineup of As I Lay Dying reunited with Lambesis with the release of "My Own Grave". On April 12, 2019, the band released a second single, titled "Redefined", which also features August Burns Red frontman Jake Luhrs.

Hipa was featured on Billy on the Street.

On August 15, 2020, it was reported that Nick Hipa had left As I Lay Dying. In July 2022, it was announced that Hipa would be performing with the band God Forbid for their reunion show.

== As I Lay Dying controversy ==
Lambesis, after his arrest, said negative things about the rest of the band, Hipa included. Hipa responded to these statements–particularly accusations of the entire band secretly being atheists and lack of contact with Lambesis after the arrest–calling them slanderous.

In November 2016, Hipa stated that Lambesis was, at the time, still of the same mind and that the relationship between the two remained damaged. Hipa's tone however, changed in an October 2017 interview with Hatebreed frontman Jamey Jasta when asked about a potential As I Lay Dying reunion with the classic members–Hipa replied: "Man, I'm on the spot… people ask us about it a lot. But what it comes down to is what makes sense with what we have going on in our lives. And we've got a lot of important things going on that don't relate to that and we've made commitments to, and that's what we are honoring at this moment. Honestly it's just not something we try and consume our thoughts with. Because it's like we have families, businesses, professions, and a band—and all these things we’re super invested into. It's like all of our attention is there with that at the moment."

In 2018, Hipa reunited with As I Lay Dying, but rumors surfaced in 2020 that he had left the band once again. Hipa broke his year-long silence in 2021, stating that "Respectfully, I left because the story and meaning we built our reunion upon decayed considerably over time. What primarily endures is a superficial pursuit I cannot justify supporting or being part of." He further elaborated that making music with the band came "at the cost of tolerating behavior which at times mistreats, disrespects, and hurts other people."

== Christianity ==
Hipa was raised with Christian values. Over time, Hipa started to exhibit some skepticism, though only on a lower scale, never disclaiming the belief system as a whole.

== Bands ==
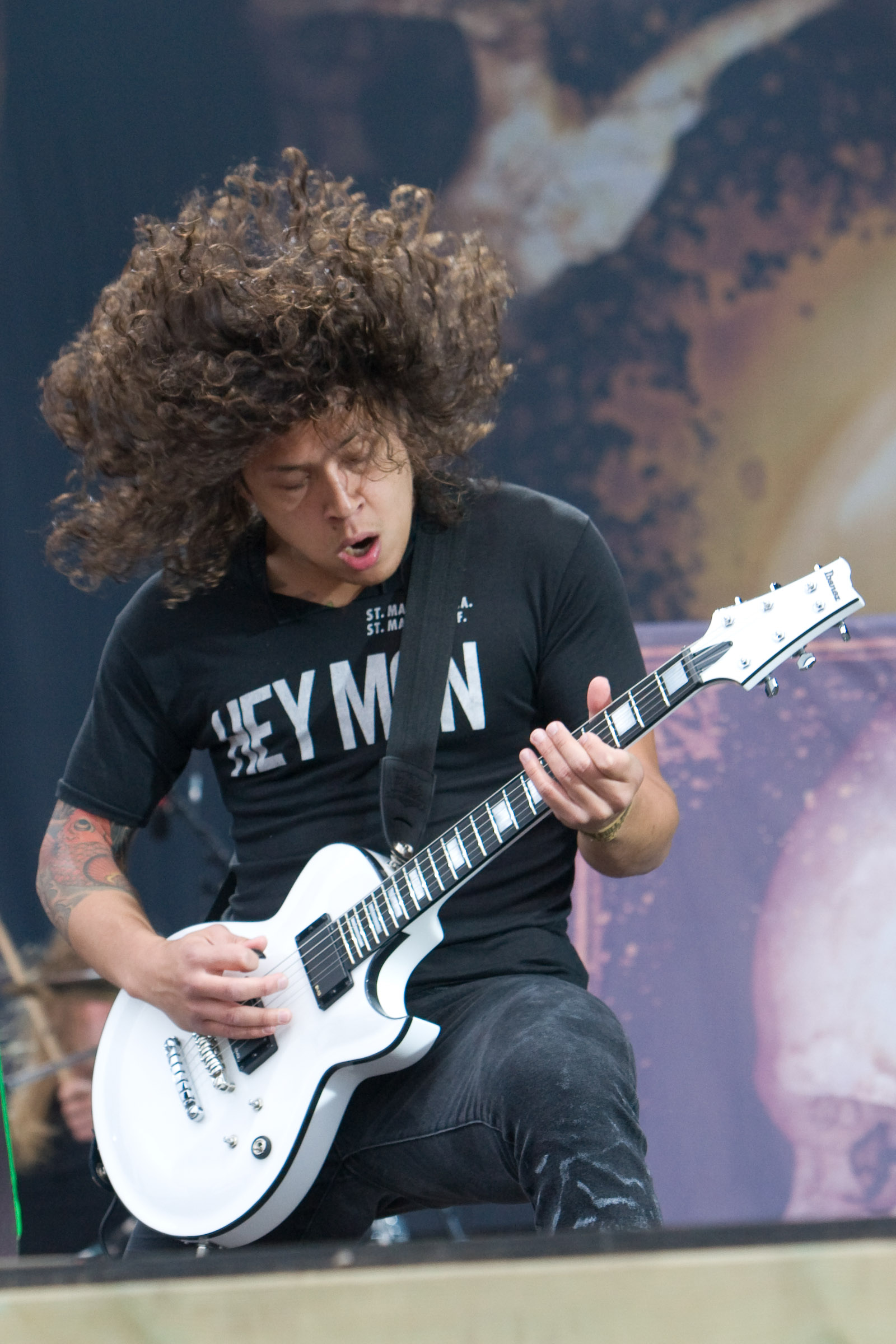
Hipa performing with As I Lay Dying

Current

- Mire (2021–present)
- God Forbid (2022–present)

Former

- Evelynn (2001–2004)
- As I Lay Dying (2003–2014, 2018–2020)
- Wovenwar (2013–2018)

== Discography ==
As I Lay Dying

- Shadows Are Security (2005)
- A Long March: The First Recordings (compilation, 2006)
- An Ocean Between Us (2007)
- The Powerless Rise (2010)
- Decas (compilation, 2011)
- Awakened (2012)
- Shaped by Fire (2019)

Wovenwar

- Wovenwar (2014)
- Honor Is Dead (2016)

Mire

- A New Found Rain (2021)
- Pale Reflection (2026)

Guest performances

- Total Brutal (2008) – Austrian Death Machine
- Ghost Thief (2013) – Living Sacrifice
- Skydancer (2015) – In Hearts Wake
- Wanderer (2016) – Heaven Shall Burn

Production

- Void (2016) – Destroy the Runner (Teaser production)
