= Jordan Mancino =

American drummer

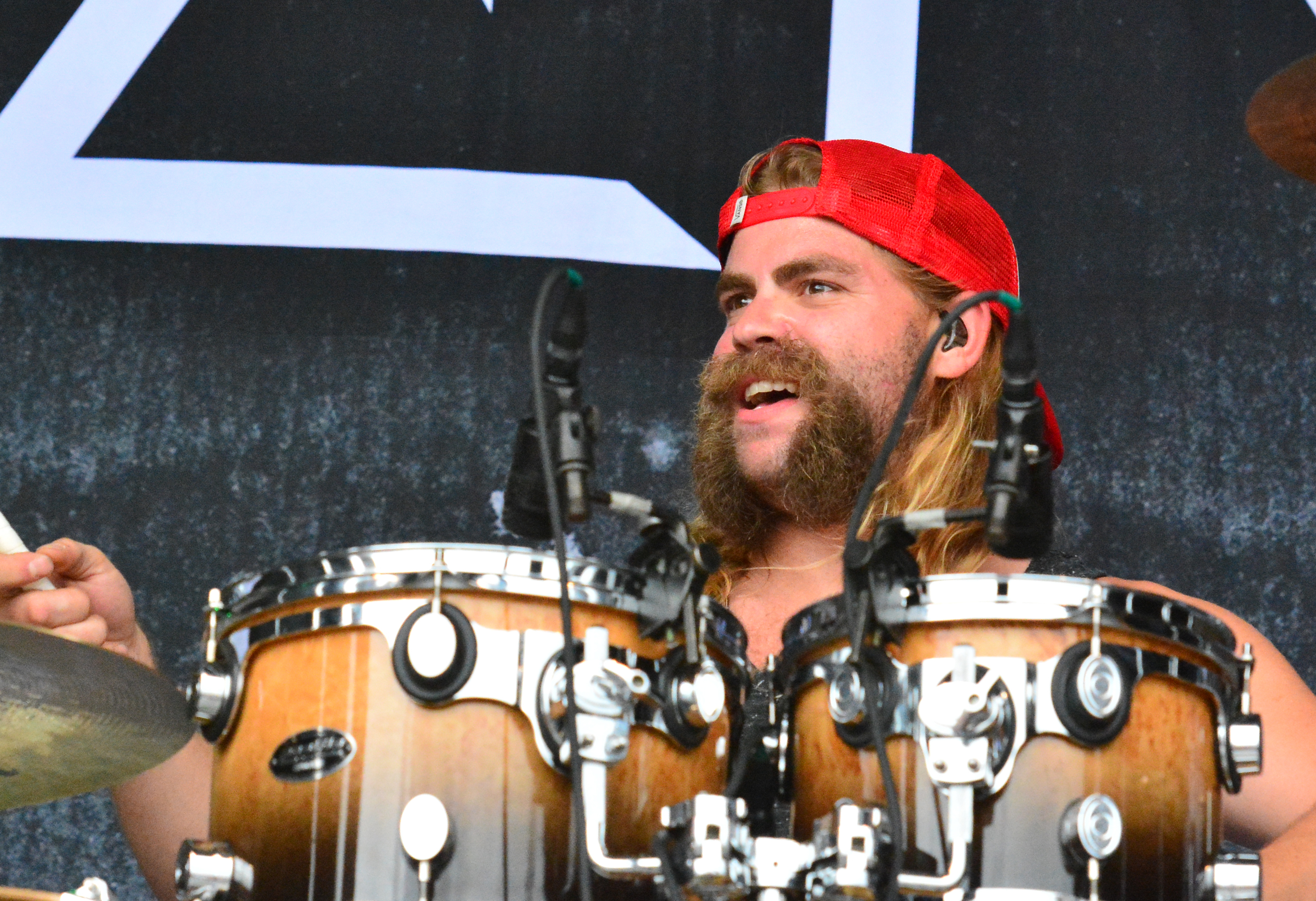
- Mancino with Wovenwar in 2014

Background information
- Born: May 22, 1983 (age 41)
- Origin: Escondido, California, U.S.
- Genres: Christian metal; metalcore; thrash metal; hard rock
- Occupation: Musician
- Instrument: Drums
- Years active: 1998–present
- Member of: Wovenwar; Souls of We
- Formerly of: As I Lay Dying; Point of Recognition

Jordan Mancino (born May 22, 1983) is an American musician. He has played with several metal acts as the official or as a live member, including As I Lay Dying, Killswitch Engage, and Wovenwar.

== Background ==
Jordan Mancino started his musical career with the band Edge of Mortality which played shows with Born Blind and Cast in Stone, one member went on to join Bleeding Through. He later met his longtime friend Tim Lambesis. The duo were in several acts together including Point of Recognition. The two friends left that band and then formed As I Lay Dying. The two formed the band and released six albums, as well as a compilation of cover songs. In 2009, Mancino joined the supergroup Souls of We.

When Lambesis plotted to kill his wife, Mancino, along with AILD's guitarists Phil Sgrosso and Nick Hipa and bassist Josh Gilbert formed a new band called Wovenwar with Shane Blay, Oh, Sleeper's guitarist and vocalist. Mancino recently stated that there is no ill will towards Lambesis. Wovenwar has released two albums, Wovenwar (2014) and Honor Is Dead (2016). In 2016, Mancino filled in for Unearth drummer Nick Pierce for a brief time. Mancino has released several play-through videos, including "Anodyne Sea". In 2017, it was reported that Lambesis resurrected AILD with all new members. It was also stated that none of the original members, including Mancino, would return to the lineup. However, in June 2018, it was confirmed the lineup of Mancino, Hipa, Sgrosso, Gilbert and Lambesis have reunited. Mancino left As I Lay Dying in 2022.

== Personal life ==
Mancino married Marisa Fowler in Las Vegas in 2022. The two had met in 2008 at an afterparty for the Soundwave music festival after noticing each other earlier in the day on their flight from Melbourne to Adelaide.

== Bands ==
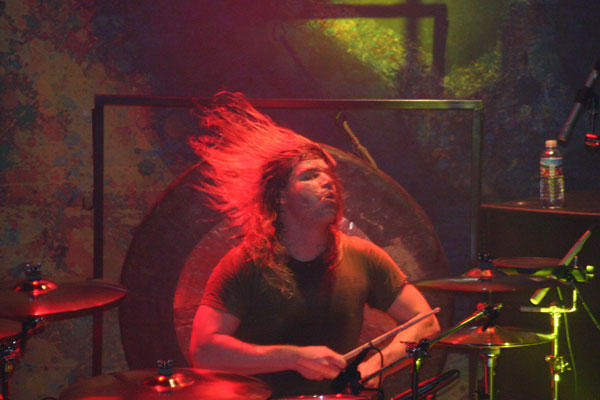
Mancino performing with As I Lay Dying

Current

- Souls of We (2009–present)

Live

- Killswitch Engage (2013)
- Unearth (2016)

Former

- Edge of Mortality (1998–2001)
- As I Lay Dying (2000–2014, 2018–2022)
- Wovenwar (2013–2018)
- One Foot Forward (2001)
- Point of Recognition (2001–2002)
- Thieves & Liars (2001–2003)
- Sworn Enemy (2007–2008)

== Discography ==
As I Lay Dying

- Beneath the Encasing of Ashes (2001)
- Frail Words Collapse (2003)
- Shadows Are Security (2005)
- A Long March: The First Recordings (compilation, 2006)
- An Ocean Between Us (2007)
- The Powerless Rise (2010)
- Decas (compilation, 2011)
- Awakened (2012)
- Shaped by Fire (2019)

Wovenwar

- Wovenwar (2014)
- Honor Is Dead (2016)

Sworn Enemy

- Maniacal (2008)
