= Austrian Death Machine =

American thrash metal band

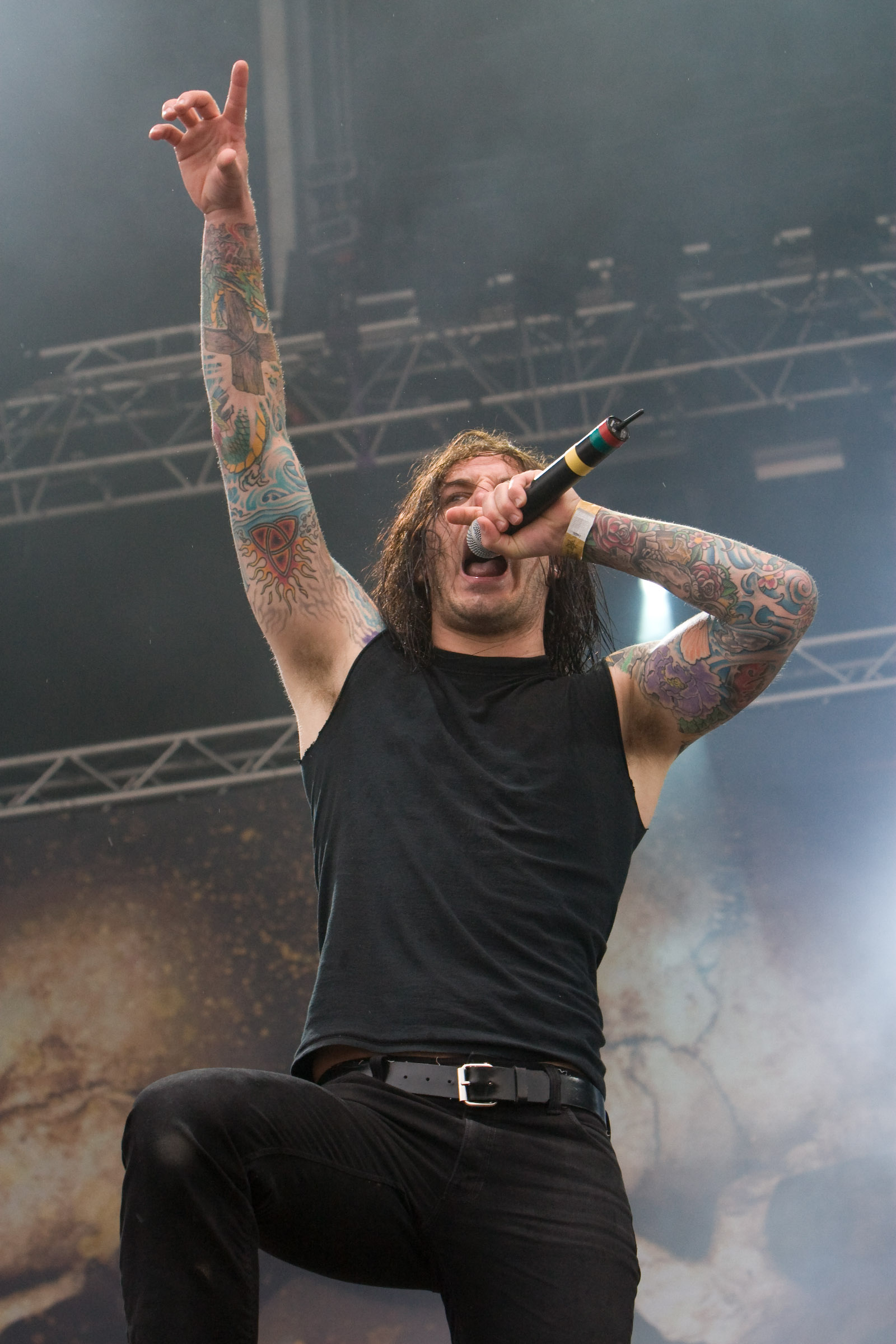
- Frontman Tim Lambesis

Background information
- Origin: San Diego, California, U.S.
- Genres: Crossover thrash; death metal; metalcore
- Years active: 2008–2014; 2023–present
- Labels: Metal Blade; Artery
- Members: Tim Lambesis; Chad Ackerman; Josh Robert Thompson
- Website: austriandeathmachine.com

Austrian Death Machine is an American death metal side project from San Diego, California, founded by As I Lay Dying vocalist Tim Lambesis to be a parody of and tribute to Arnold Schwarzenegger's films.

== History ==
Austrian Death Machine released their first album Total Brutal on July 22, 2008. The album was dedicated to Caleb Crain on May 14, 2008, for his birthday that was two months before the scheduled release date. A few months later they released a Christmas-themed EP, A Very Brutal Christmas. After some tour support of Total Brutal, Lambesis went back on tour with As I Lay Dying. While on tour he posted on Austrian Death Machine's MySpace blog that he had ideas to follow up Total Brutal with a double-disc, Double Brutal, stating that the first disc would be original songs where the second disc would be composed of cover songs. After returning home from tour in early Summer 2009, he went to work on Double Brutal which was released September 29, 2009.

Many in the press have pointed out that a Schwarzenegger movie-themed band concept was already being pursued by ArnoCorps, having been performing live in California and the UK beginning more than seven years prior to Lambesis' effort. Lambesis writes and records all the music playing guitar, bass, and drums as well as the majority of the vocals, leaving Destroy the Runner vocalist Chad Ackerman (portraying "Ahhhnold") to perform Schwarzenegger-like vocals. The only thing Lambesis or Ackerman do not record are the guitar solos in every song which are performed by various guitarists from other bands. Lambesis stated where As I Lay Dying "is heartfelt and full of passion" Austrian Death Machine on the other hand "is an outlet of pure testosterone and stupidity."

Despite Lambesis' May 2013 arrest for attempting to hire a hitman to murder his estranged wife, it was announced in 2014, that Triple Brutal would be released in April on Artery Recordings. In 2014, Lambesis was sentenced to six years in prison, with 48 days credit for time served.

On October 17, 2023, the band released a new single, "No Pain No Gain", with a music video and announced their plan to release a new album in 2024. On December 5, it was revealed the band's fourth album, Quad Brutal, would be released on February 23, 2024; the second single from the album, "Don't Be Lazy", was also released.

== Members ==
Main

- Tim Lambesis – lead vocals, guitar, bass, drums (2008–present)
- Chad Ackerman – Schwarzenegger impersonation vocals (2008–2014)
- Josh Robert Thompson – Schwarzenegger impersonation vocals on Double Brutal (2009)
- Timothy Benham – Schwarzenegger impersonation vocals on Double Brutal (2009)
- Joe Gaudet – Schwarzenegger impersonation vocals on Triple Brutal (2014)

Live lineup

- Tim Lambesis – lead vocals (2008–present)
- Justin Olszewski – Schwarzenegger impersonation vocals (2009–2014)
- Emil Werstler (of Dååth) – guitar
- Josh Gilbert (of As I Lay Dying, Wovenwar) – bass (2009–2014)
- Jon "The Charn" Rice (of Job for a Cowboy) – drums (2009–2014)

Former live

- JP Gericke (of Death by Stereo) – guitar
- Mark MacDonald (of Mercury Switch) – guitar

Session guitar soloists

- Jason Suecof of Capharnaum (All releases)
- Mark MacDonald of Mercury Switch (All releases)
- Dan Fitzgerald (on Total Brutal)
- Adam Dutkiewicz of Killswitch Engage (on Total Brutal)
- Nick Hipa of As I Lay Dying (on Total Brutal)
- Eyal Levi and Emil Werstler of Dååth (on Total Brutal)
- Jason Barnes formerly of Haste the Day (on Total Brutal)
- Andrew Tapley formerly of The Human Abstract (on Double Brutal)
- Rusty Cooley of Outworld (on Double Brutal)
- Chris Storey formerly of All Shall Perish (on Double & Triple Brutal)
- Buz McGrath of Unearth (on Double Brutal)
- Kris Norris formerly of Darkest Hour (on Double Brutal)
- James "JP" Gericke of Death By Stereo (all releases)
- Rocky Gray of Living Sacrifice (on Double Brutal)
- Kevin Schwartz formerly of Pathology (on Triple Brutal)
- Wes Hauch formerly of The Faceless (on Triple Brutal)
- Dan Palmer (on Triple Brutal)
- Doc Coyle of God Forbid (on Triple Brutal)
- Sean Swafford (on Triple Brutal)
- Lorenzo Antonucci formerly of Sworn Enemy (on Triple Brutal)

Session drummers and percussionists

- Brandon "B-Town" Trahan of Impending Doom
- Mike Catalano formerly of Destroy the Runner
- Jerad Buckwalter formerly of Sworn Enemy
- Jeff Gretz of Zao
- Christian Bass of Heaven Shall Burn

== Discography ==
Studio albums

| Title | Year | Label | Chart Positions | | | | |
| Title | Year | Label | Top 200 | US Heat | US Indie | US Hard Rock | US Rock |
|---|---|---|---|---|---|---|---|
| Total Brutal | 2008 | Metal Blade Records | 179 | 7 | 29 | — | — |
| Double Brutal | 2009 | Metal Blade Records | 105 | 1 | 15 | 14 | 44 |
| Triple Brutal | 2014 | Artery Recordings | 64 | — | — | — | — |
| Quad Brutal | 2024 | Napalm Records | — | — | — | — | — |

Extended plays

- A Very Brutal Christmas (2008)
- Jingle All the Way (2011)
