= Double Brutal =

Studio album by Austrian Death Machine
- Released: September 29, 2009
- Recorded: Summer 2009
- Genre: Crossover thrash, metalcore, parody music
- Length: 29:58 (Disc 1); 22:41 (Disc 2); 52:39 (Double Brutality)
- Label: Metal Blade
- Producer: Tim Lambesis

Austrian Death Machine chronology
A Very Brutal Christmas (2008)	Double Brutal (2009)	Triple Brutal (2014)

Professional ratings
Review scores
Source	Rating
Allmusic	3.5/5 stars
Bring on Mixed Reviews	3.5/5 stars
Decibel	3/10 stars
Thrash Hits	1/6 stars
Ultimate Guitar	(7.7/10)

Double Brutal is the second full-length album by As I Lay Dying vocalist Tim Lambesis' parody project Austrian Death Machine. Unlike the previous album, Total Brutal, Double Brutal is a two-disc effort; the first disc composed of original songs inspired by Arnold Schwarzenegger movies, and the second disc being covers of songs that can relate to Schwarzenegger movies. Upon release, the album debuted at No. 105 on the Billboard 200.

As with Total Brutal, Double Brutal follows a similar format with a guitar solo in every song, various skits featuring Lambesis and Ahhnold, and cover art created by Ed Repka.

A music video for "I Need Your Clothes, Your Boots and Your Motorcycle" was made to promote the album.

A contest winner of who could impersonate Schwarzenegger well enough was presented to be featured on the album. The winner was Timothy Benham where he was dubbed as "Ahhnold's clone" in the album's notes.

== Track listing ==
=== Disc 1 ===
1. "Double Ahhnold" – 1:22
2. "I Need Your Clothes, Your Boots, and Your Motorcycle" – 3:54 (Quote from Terminator 2: Judgment Day)
3. "Let Off Some Steam Bennett" – 3:15 (Quote from Commando)
4. "Who Writes the Songs? (The Real Bomb Track)" – 1:06
5. "It's Simple, If it Jiggles it's Fat" – 1:44 (Quote from Pumping Iron)
6. "See You at the Party Richter" – 3:33 (Quote from Total Recall)
7. "Hey Cookie Monster, Nothing is as Brutal as Neaahhh" 0:34
8. "Who Told You You Could Eat My Cookies?" – 3:12 (Quote from Jingle All the Way)
9. "Come on Cohaagen, Give Deez People Ehyar" – 3:18 (Quote from Total Recall)
10. "Who is Your Daddy, and What Does He 2?" – 0:24 (Quote from Kindergarten Cop)
11. "Come on, Do it, Do it, Come on, Come on, Kill me, Do It Now" – 2:58 (Quote from Predator)
12. "Allow Me To Break The Ice" – 2:09 (Quote from Batman & Robin)
13. "Conan, What is Best in Life?" – 2:29 (Quote from Conan the Barbarian)

=== Disc 2 ===
1. "Intro to the Intro" – 0:51
2. "T2 Theme" – 1:13
3. "Hell Bent for Leather" (Judas Priest cover) – 2:33
4. "Time Travel: The Metallica Conspiracy" – 0:35
5. "Trapped Under Ice" (Metallica cover) – 3:59
6. "Iron Fist" (Motörhead cover) – 2:38
7. "Recalling Mars" – 0:36
8. "I Turned into a Martian" (The Misfits cover) – 1:28
9. "Killing Is My Business... and Business Is Good!" (Megadeth cover) – 3:04
10. "Tactically Dangerous – Cannibal Commando" (Goretorture cover) – 2:34
11. "Gotta Go" (Agnostic Front cover) – 3:12

== Personnel ==
=== Primary musicians ===
- Tim Lambesis – guitar, bass, drums, vocals, trumpet, keyboards, oboe
- Josh Robert Thompson – Schwarzenegger impersonation vocals
- Timothy Benham - Schwarzenegger impersonation vocals

=== Guest musicians ===
Guitar Solos on Disc 1

- Andrew Tapley of The Human Abstract – Tracks 2 & 5
- Rusty Cooley of Outworld – Track 3
- Chris Storey formerly of All Shall Perish – Track 6
- Mark MacDonald of Mercury Switch – Track 8
- Buz McGrath of Unearth – Track 9
- Kris Norris formerly of Darkest Hour – Track 11
- James "JP" Gericke of Skyline Collapse and Death by Stereo – Track 12
- Rocky Gray of Living Sacrifice – Track 13 (First)
- Jason Suecof of Capharnaum – Track 13 (Second)

Guitar Solos on Disc 2

- Mark MacDonald of Mercury Switch – All cover tracks

Additional musicians

- James "JP" Gericke of Skyline Collapse and Death by Stereo - additional rhythm guitar and bass
- Jeff Gretz of Zao - all drums on Disc 2 except T2 Theme & Tactically Dangerous
- Josh James of Evergreen Terrace - Guest vocals on Track 5 of Disc 1
- Kelly "Carnage" Cairns - Backing Vocals on Tracks 6, 8, and 11 of Disc 2
- Dan Gregory - Backing Vocals on Track 3 of Disc 2
- Daniel Castleman - Harp on Track 6 of Disc 1
- Josh James, James Gericke, Justin Olszewski, Henry C. Hampton III, Lance Miles,
- Dan Gregory, Josh Gilbert, Kelly Cairns - Gang Vocals

Other credits

- Mixed by Daniel Castleman
- Tracked and Mixed at Lambesis Studios in San Marcos, CA
- Engineered by Kelly "Carnage" Cairns & Daniel Castleman
- Additional drum tracking on some of the cover songs done at Big Fish in Encinitas, CA
- All cover song guitar solos and the "Who Told You..." solo engineered by John Helmig at Verse Media Studios

== Films referenced ==
- Pumping Iron (1977)
- Conan the Barbarian (1982)
- The Terminator (1984)
- Commando (1985)
- Predator (1987)
- Total Recall (1990)
- Kindergarten Cop (1990)
- Terminator 2: Judgment Day (1991)
- Jingle All the Way (1996)
- Batman & Robin (1997)
