= When I Am God =

Studio album by Oh, Sleeper
- Released: October 23, 2007
- Studio: Planet Red Studios, Richmond, Virginia
- Genre: Metalcore; post-hardcore
- Length: 42:18
- Label: Solid State
- Producer: Andreas Magnusson

Oh, Sleeper chronology
The Armored March EP (2006)	When I Am God (2007)	Son of the Morning (2009)

Professional ratings
Review scores
Source	Rating
AllMusic	3/5 stars
Jesus Freak Hideout	4/5 stars
Indie Vision Music	9/10
Punk News	2.5/5 stars

When I Am God is the debut album by American metalcore band, Oh, Sleeper. It was released on October 23, 2007, in the United States through Solid State Records.

After being noticed by Solid State by their release of their EP The Armored March in 2006, the band began recording When I Am God in the course of 2007 with all of the songs from the EP re-recorded along with several new tracks. A music video for the song "Vices Like Vipers" was produced and released in 2007.

== Track listing ==
All lyrics are written by Micah Kinard; all music is composed by Oh, Sleeper.

No.	Title	Length
1.	"Vices Like Vipers"	4:19
2.	"I Will Welcome the Reaping"	3:53
3.	"We Are the Archers"	3:55
4.	"Charlatan's Host"	4:01
5.	"The Siren's Song"	5:04
6.	"The Color Theft"	4:54
7.	"To Flagship"	3:23
8.	"His Name Was Bishop"	3:10
9.	"Building the Nations"	3:34
10.	"Revelations in the Calm"	2:21
11.	"The End of a Dark Campaign"	3:45
Total length:		42:18

== Personnel ==
Oh, Sleeper

- Micah Kinard – lead vocals
- Shane Blay – lead guitar, clean vocals
- James Erwin – rhythm guitar
- Lucas Starr – bass guitar
- Ryan Conley – drums

Production

- Andreas Magnusson – producer, engineer, mixing
- Alan Douches – mastering
- Chris Dowhan – engineer
- Ryan Clark – design, artwork
