= Types & Shadows =

Studio album by Wolves at the Gate
- Released: November 4, 2016
- Genre: Christian metal; post-hardcore; metalcore
- Length: 54:28
- Label: Solid State
- Producer: Will Putney; Randy LeBoeuf

Wolves at the Gate chronology
VxV (2014)	Types & Shadows (2016)	Eclipse (2019)

Singles from Types & Shadows
- 1. "Flickering Flame" Released: September 15, 2016; 2. "Asleep" Released: September 30, 2016; 3. "War in the Time of Peace" Released: October 14, 2016

Types & Shadows is the third studio album by American metalcore band Wolves at the Gate. It was produced by Will Putney and released on November 4, 2016, by Solid State Records.

== Release ==
On September 15, 2016, Wolves at the Gate released the single "Flickering Flame", and later on September 30, they released "Asleep". They released the final single, "War in the Time of Peace" for their third studio album, Types & Shadows, which was released on November 4, 2016, by Solid State Records.

== Reception ==
Types & Shadows received generally positive reviews, with Joshua Olson of Indie Vision Music saying that "Types & Shadows shows Wolves At The Gate reaching the peak of the sonic abilities they've shown throughout their career."

Professional ratings
Review scores
Source	Rating
Louder Sound	3.5/5 stars
Jesus Freak Hideout	4/5 stars
Indie Vision Music	4/5

== Track listing ==
All tracks are written by Wolves at the Gate.

No.	Title	Length
1.	"Asleep"	3:57
2.	"Flickering Flame"	4:32
3.	"War in the Time of Peace"	4:15
4.	"Anathema"	3:30
5.	"The Aftermath"	4:23
6.	"Fountain"	3:32
7.	"Weary Ground"	3:16
8.	"Lowly"	3:40
9.	"Broken Bones"	3:52
10.	"Convalesce"	3:38
11.	"Chasing the Wind"	4:37
12.	"Hindsight"	5:16
13.	"Grave Digger"	6:00
Total length:		54:28

== Personnel ==
Wolves at the Gate

- Nick Detty – lead vocals, keyboards
- Steve Cobucci – guitars, clean vocals, piano, production, engineering
- Ben Summers – bass, backing vocals
- Abishai Collingsworth – drums

Additional personnel

- Will Putney and Randy LeBoeuf – production, engineering
- Brandon Ebel – executive production
- Steve Seid – engineering
- Cory Hadje – management
- Eric Powell – booking
- Adam Skatula – A&R

== Charts ==
Chart (2019)	Peak position
US Christian Albums	8
US Rock Albums	24
US Hard Rock Albums	8
US Independent Albums	12
