= Alive in Wild Paint =

American indie rock band

- Origin: Phoenix, Arizona, USA
- Genres: Indie rock, alternative rock
- Years active: 2003–2009
- Label: Equal Vision Records
- Past members: Travis Bryant; Matt Grabe; David Roat; Austin Wilson

Alive in Wild Paint (formerly known as Goodbye Tomorrow) was an indie rock band from Phoenix, Arizona, formed in 2003. Since early 2009, they have been on a silent hiatus.

== Biography ==
Since the group's original formation in 2003, the band's line-up underwent much change. Minus Matt Gilbert, David Roat was added to the line-up in 2004 and Travis Bryant was added in 2006 and came almost directly from Tooth and Nail Records' act, Terminal. Matt Grabe was also added in 2006 and Austin Wilson was the latest addition to the band in 2007. The band signed to Equal Vision Records, through which they first released a 3 song self-titled EP under the name Goodbye Tomorrow.

On September 29, 2007, the group changed their name to Alive in Wild Paint, following the lineup changes. The name comes from Richard Bach's 1977 novel Illusions. They released one album, Ceilings, which was produced by Mark Trombino and released in 2008. In early August 2008, the band had their trailer and gear stolen. Shortly thereafter, the band was placed on their record label's list of inactive bands.

== Members ==
Final Members

- Travis Bryant - Vocals / Guitar || 2007 - 2009
- Matt Grabe - Guitar / Piano || 2006 - 2009
- David Roat - Bass Guitar || 2006 - 2009
- Austin Wilson - Drums || 2008-2009

Former members

- Matthew Gilbert - Vocals / Piano / Acoustic Guitar || 2003 - 2007
- Joshua Niles - Drums / Percussion || 2003 - 2008
- Josh Johnson - Guitar / Bass Guitar / Acoustic Guitar || 2003 - 2008
- Roger Willis - Bass Guitar / Guitar / Backing Vocals || 2003-2005
- Jared Wallace - Bass Guitar || 2004 - 2005
- Brandon Bowman - Guitar || 2003
- Josh Rodriguez - Bass Guitar || 2003
- Dan Parker - Bass Guitar || 2003
- James Cawley - Guitar || 2003

== Discography ==
Goodbye Tomorrow

- Tied by Miles EP (Self-released, 2004)
- Goodbye Tomorrow EP (Equal Vision Records, 2006)

Alive in Wild Paint

- Ceilings (Equal Vision Records, 2008)
