= Wolves at the Gate =

American metalcore band

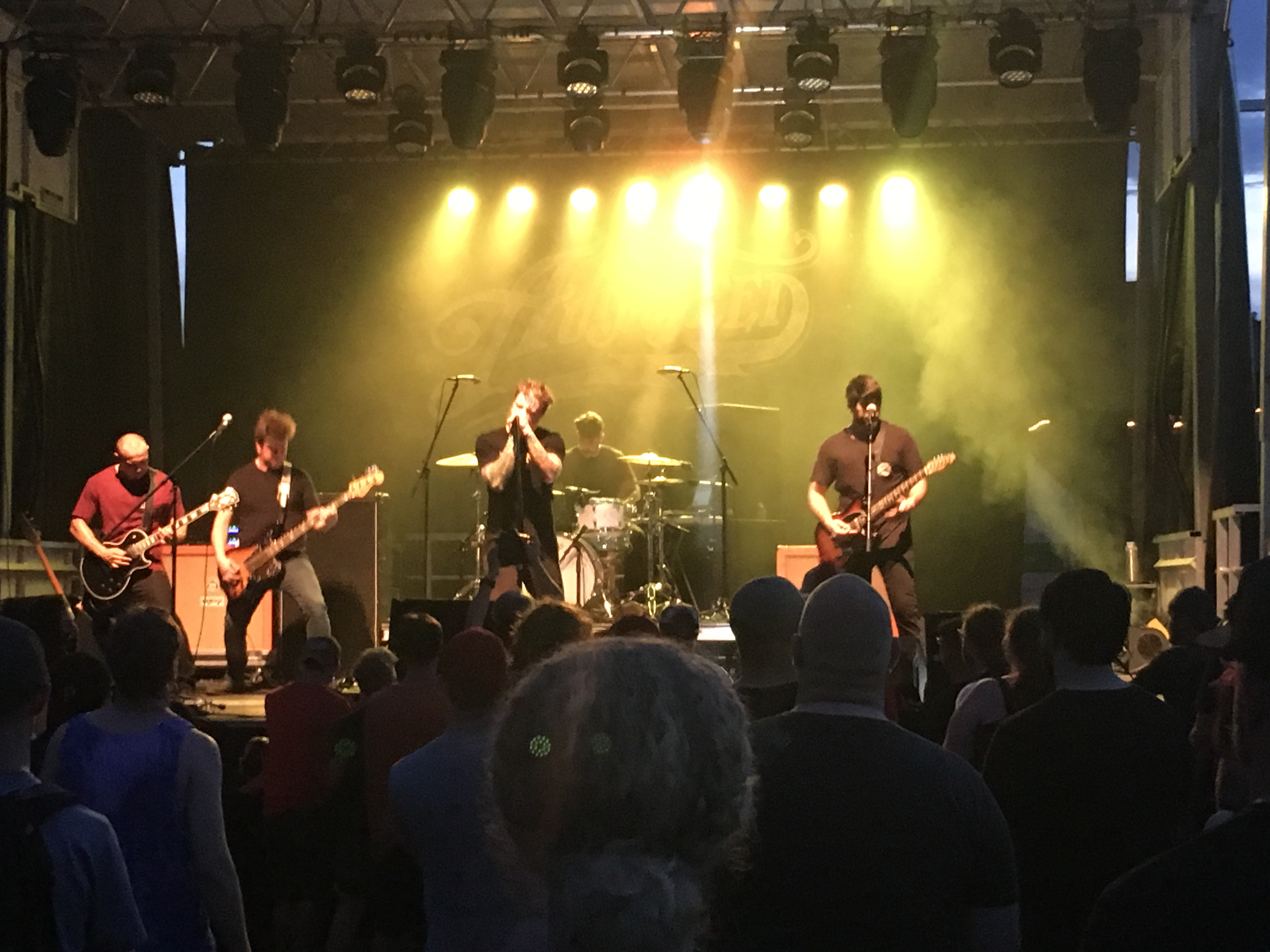
- Wolves at the Gate at Audiofeed 2019

Background information
- Also known as: Wolves, WATG
- Origin: Cedarville, Ohio, U.S.
- Genres: Metalcore; Christian metal; post-hardcore
- Years active: 2008–present
- Label: Solid State
- Members: Steve Cobucci; Ben Summers; Nick Detty; Abishai Collingsworth; Joey Alarcon
- Past members: Ryan Connelly; Colin Jones; Dave Nester; Jeremy Steckel; Ben Millhouse; Dylan Baxter

Wolves at the Gate is an American metalcore band that originated from Cedarville, Ohio. Formed in 2008, they are currently signed to Solid State Records, where the band has released five EPs: We Are the Ones (2011), Back to School (2013), Reprise (2015), Dawn (2020) and Lowborn (2022), six full-length albums: Captors (2012), VxV (2014), Types & Shadows (2016), Eclipse (2019), Eulogies (2022), Wasteland (2025) and three Christmas singles over the years.

== History ==
The band formed in 2008 and are from Cedarville, Ohio.

Around late 2007 or early 2008, guitarist/vocalist Stephen Cobucci and drummer Ryan Conelly started playing music together "for fun". The duo were soon asked to perform a show, and to create a full band, brought in Jeremy Steckel as lead guitarist and Ben Summers as their bassist. Vocalist Colin Jones joined soon after. Wolves at the Gate were officially founded in early 2008.

In 2009, the band released their debut demo EP, Prisoner of War, available to stream on their ReverbNation page. Drummer Ryan Connelly left shortly after its release. The band released another demo EP, Pulled From the Deep - Demo, the following year.

In 2010, the band recorded and released their EP We Are the Ones. Since Conelly's departure, all drum parts were programmed by Cobucci. It was recorded in engineer Tyler Smith's apartment in the back of a funeral home. After being signed to Solid State Records in September 2011, the EP was re-released on November 15 of that year, now with newly designed cover art, slight differences in production and vocals, two bonus tracks, and a physical release exclusive to Hot Topic.

The band released their debut studio album Captors on July 3, 2012, with Solid State. For the Billboard charting week of July 21, 2012, Captors charted at No. 7 on the Billboard Christian Albums chart, and at No. 17 on the Hard Rock Albums chart.

Their next album, VxV (pronounced "five by five"), was released on June 10, 2014. The band released the song "Dust to Dust" on April 24, 2014. On May 12, 2015, the band released their third EP, Reprise, consisting of acoustic versions of songs from previous albums. The band's third album, Types & Shadows, was released on November 4, 2016.

Their fourth album, Eclipse, was announced on April 24, 2019, with a planned release date of July 26, 2019. At the same time, new band photos were released with a new member, Joey Alarcon joining in on guitars. They released its first single, "The Cure", on April 26, 2019. A second single, "A Voice in the Violence", was released on May 16, 2019. A third single, "Drifter", was premiered via Revolver Magazine on June 13, 2019.

On September 4, 2020, the band announced their fourth EP, Dawn, consisting of acoustic versions of songs off Eclipse, would be releasing October 9, 2020. That same day, the first single, an acoustic version of "A Voice in the Violence" was released and the second, "Counterfeit", was released on September 25, 2020.

On March 9, 2021, it was revealed that Tim Lambesis was working on a new side project with the band's guitarist Joey Alarcon. Lambesis had previously co-produced Eclipse alongside Alarcon and Steve Cobucci. On April 16, 2021, the band released a new single, "Stop The Bleeding", which was followed by another single, "Shadows", on October 15, 2021. After three more singles, "Deadweight", "Lights & Fire", and "Peace that Starts the War", were released, Wolves at the Gate issued their album Eulogies, on March 11, 2022. On November 18, 2022, the band released a Christmas EP, Lowborn, featuring two Christmas songs the band had released a decade prior, along with three newer cuts including the title cut which had been released as a single in 2021.

On June 9, 2023, the band released a cover of "Heathens", originally by Twenty One Pilots. "We have a lot of respect for the creativity that Tyler Joseph and Josh Dun express in their music.", wrote the band on Instagram, "Something they do so well is expressing dark and somber moods in their music without sacrificing memorability and melody. The dynamics of the song left an open landscape for us to put our own fingerprint on it. As well, the lyrics carried a very relatable sentiment that could be seen and interpreted on a few different levels." They released another cover, "Attack" by Thirty Seconds to Mars, on July 7, 2023. After releasing their cover of Incubus's "Pardon Me", the band announced their covers album, Lost in Translation, which was released on September 22, 2023. The album features their covers of "Heathens" and "Attack" along with covers of Billie Eilish, Jon Bellion, Jimmy Eat World, Linkin Park, Muse, Foo Fighters and Deftones.

On April 17, 2024, the band updated that they were in the process of making their next record, with Josh Gilbert helping. On March 7, 2025, the band announced their sixth album Wasteland and its release on May 30, 2025, as well as releasing the track list and the first single, "Parasite".

On September 17th, 2026, during their tour with Demon Hunter, Wolves at the Gate released a new single, "Letterkills", which was followed by a second on November 13th, 2026, titled "Firewall"; it was jointly released with the announcement of their album Borderland, set to release on April 9th, 2027.

== Band members ==
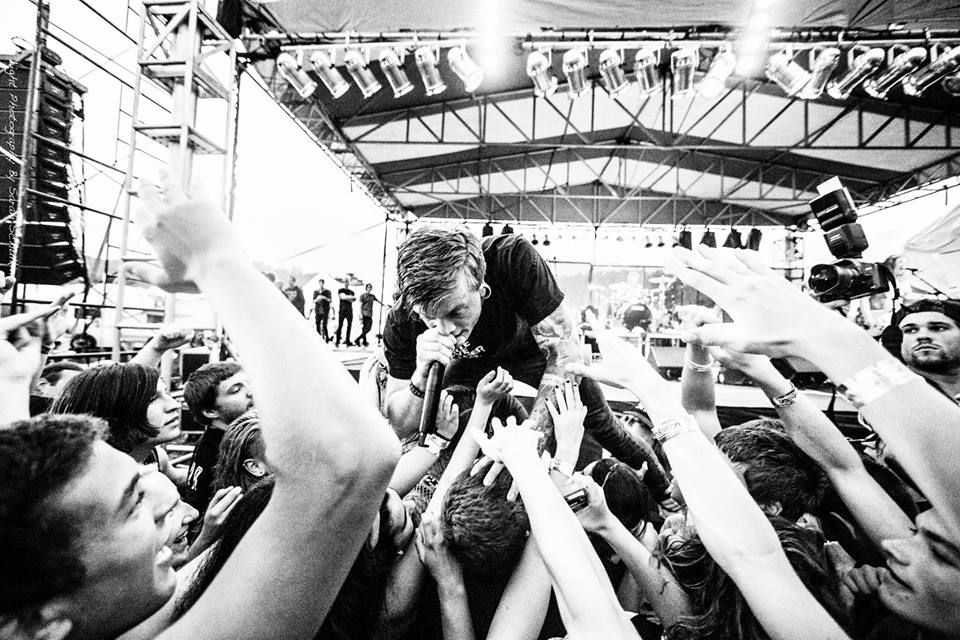
Wolves at the Gate in 2013

Current

- Steve Cobucci – rhythm guitar, clean vocals (2008–present); lead guitar (2012–2019)
- Ben Summers – bass, backing vocals (2008–present)
- Nick Detty – lead vocals, keyboards (2012–present)
- Abishai Collingsworth – drums (2015–present)
- Joey Alarcon – lead guitar (2019–present)

Former

- Ryan Connelly – drums (2008-2009)
- Colin Jones – unclean vocals (2008–2011)
- Dave Nester– drums (2009–2010)
- Jeremy Steckel – lead guitar (2008–2012)
- Ben Millhouse (Decyfer Down) – drums (2011–2013)
- Dylan Baxter – drums (2013–2015)

Timeline

== Discography ==
=== Studio albums ===
List of studio albums, with selected chart positions
Title	Album details	Peak chart positions				
Title	Album details	US	US Christ	US Rock	US Hard	US Indie
Captors	Released: July 3, 2012; Label: Solid State; Formats: CD, digital download	— (Note: Captors did not enter the Billboard 200, but peaked at No. 159 on the Top Current Albums chart.)	7	—	17	—
VxV	Released: June 10, 2014; Label: Solid State; Formats: CD, LP, digital download	134	6	41	13	25
Types & Shadows	Released: November 4, 2016; Label: Solid State; Formats: CD, LP, digital download	— (Note: Types & Shadows did not enter the Billboard 200, but peaked at No. 87 on the Top Current Albums chart.)	8	24	8	12
Eclipse	Released: July 26, 2019; Label: Solid State; Formats: CD, LP, digital download	— (Note: Eclipse did not enter the Billboard 200, but peaked at No. 32 on the Top Album Sales chart.)	4	—	23	10
Eulogies	Released: March 11, 2022; Label: Solid State; Formats: CD, LP, digital download	—	—	—	—	—
Wasteland	Released: May 30, 2025; Label: Solid State; Formats: CD, LP, digital download	–	–	–	–	–
Borderland	Released: April 9, 2027; Label: Solid State; Formats: CD, LP, digital download	–	–	–	–	–

=== Independent EPs ===
Year	Album	Label
2009	Prisoner of War (demo)	Independent
2010	Pulled from the Deep (demo)	Independent
2010	We Are the Ones	Independent

=== Studio EPs ===
Year	EP	Label
2011	We Are the Ones	Solid State Records
2013	Back to School	Solid State Records
2015	Reprise	Solid State Records
2020	Dawn	Solid State Records
2022	Lowborn	Solid State Records

=== Other releases ===
List of other releases, with selected chart positions
Title	Album details	Peak chart positions				
Title	Album details	US	US Christ	US Rock	US Hard	US Indie
Lost in Translation	Released: September 22, 2023; Label: Solid State; Formats: CD, LP, digital download	—	—	—	—	—

=== Singles ===
Year	Song	Label	Album
2012	"The King"	Solid State Records	Non-album single
2012	"Dead Man"	Solid State Records	Captors
2014	"The Bird and the Snake"	Solid State Records	VxV
2014	"Dust to Dust"	Solid State Records	VxV
2016	"Flickering Flame"	Solid State Records	Types & Shadows
2016	"Asleep"	Solid State Records	Types & Shadows
2016	"War in the Time of Peace"	Solid State Records	Types & Shadows
2019	"The Cure"	Solid State Records	Eclipse
2019	"A Voice in the Violence"	Solid State Records	Eclipse
2019	"Drifter"	Solid State Records	Eclipse
2019	"Counterfeit"	Solid State Records	Eclipse
2021	"Stop the Bleeding"	Solid State Records	Eulogies
2021	"Lowborn"	Solid State Records	Lowborn EP
2021	"Shadows"	Solid State Records	Eulogies
2022	"Lights & Fire"	Solid State Records	Eulogies
2022	"Peace That Starts The War"	Solid State Records	Eulogies
2022	"Deadweight"	Solid State Records	Eulogies
2022	"Dark, Cold Night"	Solid State Records	Lowborn EP
2023	"Heathens" (Twenty One Pilots cover)	Solid State Records	Lost in Translation
2023	"Attack" (Thirty Seconds to Mars cover)	Solid State Records	Lost in Translation
2023	"Pardon Me" (Incubus cover)	Solid State Records	Lost in Translation
2023	"Stupid Deep" (Jon Bellion cover)	Solid State Records	Lost in Translation
2025	"Parasite"	Solid State Records	Wasteland
2025	"Synthetic Sun"	Solid State Records	Wasteland
2025	"(law of the) Wasteland"	Solid State Records	Wasteland
2025	"Death Clock"	Solid State Records	Wasteland
2026	"Letterkills"	Solid State Records	Borderland
2026	"Firewall"	Solid State Records	Borderland
