= Eulogies (Wolves at the Gate album) =

Studio album by Wolves at the Gate
- Released: March 11, 2022
- Genre: Christian metal; metalcore; post-hardcore
- Length: 46:38
- Label: Solid State
- Producer: Steve Cobucci; Joey Alarcon

Wolves at the Gate chronology
Eclipse (2019)	Eulogies (2022)	Wasteland (2025)

Singles from Eulogies
- 1. "Stop the Bleeding" Released: April 16, 2021; 2. "Shadows" Released: October 15, 2021; 3. "Lights & Fire" Released: January 21, 2022; 4. "Peace That Starts the War" Released: February 11, 2022; 5. "Deadweight" Released: March 2, 2022

Eulogies is the fifth studio album by American metalcore band Wolves at the Gate. It was produced by Steve Cobucci & Joey Alarcon, and released on March 11, 2022, by Solid State Records.

== Release ==
On April 16, 2021, the band released a new single, "Stop The Bleeding", which was followed by another single, "Shadows", on October 15, 2021. After releasing two more singles, "Lights & Fire" and "Peace That Starts the War", they announced on March 2, 2022, that their fifth studio album, "Eulogies" would be released on March 11 through Solid State Records.

== Reception ==
Professional ratings
Review scores
Source	Rating
Blabbermouth.net	9/10
Jesus Freak Hideout	4.5/5 stars

The album has been received well, with Zachary Van Dyke of Rock on Purpose saying "While they haven't reinvented metalcore, what they have done is create an incredibly impactful album that stands above the crowd."

== Track listing ==
All tracks are written by Wolves at the Gate, except where noted.

Eulogies track listing
No.	Title	Writer(s)	Length
1.	"Shadows"		3:23
2.	"Peace That Starts the War"		2:48
3.	"Kiss the Wave"		3:49
4.	"Lights & Fire"		3:30
5.	"Eulogies"		3:32
6.	"Weight of Glory"		2:46
7.	"Deadweight"		4:48
8.	"No Tomorrow"		3:23
9.	"Stop the Bleeding"		3:48
10.	"White Flag"		2:44
11.	"Out of Sight"		3:25
12.	"Embracing Accusation" (Shane & Shane cover)	Shane Barnad	4:15
13.	"Silent Anthem"		5:26
Total length:			46:38

== Personnel ==
Wolves at the Gate

- Nick Detty – lead vocals, keyboards
- Joey Alarcon – lead guitar, production
- Steve Cobucci – rhythm guitar, clean vocals, production
- Ben Summers – bass, backing vocals
- Abishai Collingsworth – drums
