= Terminal (American band) =

American rock band

- Origin: Mansfield, Texas, United States
- Genres: Emo, post-hardcore, Christian rock
- Years active: 1998–2006
- Label: Tooth & Nail

Terminal was an American rock band from Mansfield, Texas.

== History ==
=== Formation and How the Lonely Keep ===
Formed in 1998 under the name Letter Twelve, the group signed to Tooth & Nail Records in 2004 and changed its name. The band's first, and only, release under this name was entitled How the Lonely Keep, and in 2005 they went on tour with labelmates Anberlin. The record hit No. 39 on the Billboard Top Christian Albums chart in 2005. Matthew Tsai of Absolute Punk called the record "one of the great emo releases of the 00's". Melodic.net compared the group to Anberlin, Jimmy Eat World and Third Eye Blind.

Shortly after the release of the album, all of the band's members except for lead singer Travis Bryant departed the group during their tour with The Spill Canvas and Rufio; Bryant toured with Terminal as a solo act for the remainder of the tour. Bryant found replacements for the members later in 2005 and continued to tour behind the album, touring with Saosin, He Is Legend, The Juliana Theory, Cartel, The Working Title, Codeseven, The Receiving End of Sirens, and Yesterdays Rising. Terminal split in January 2006.

=== Post-breakup ===
Ryan Conley, and James Erwin are now all members of the band Oh, Sleeper, a metalcore band which later signed to Solidstate Records. The band reunited on December 28, 2007 for a one-off reunion show in Plano, TX. Bryant periodically covers Terminal songs in his current band, Alive in Wild Paint.

Matt Lucas owns and operates Trust Printshop, a screen printing company. Ryan Flynn is now a commercial photographer and film maker based out of Los Angeles.

Travis Bryant was featured as a guitarist for the band Analog Rebellion.

== Members ==
- Travis Bryant - vocals/guitar (1998–2021)
- Ryan Flynn - bass (2005–2006)
- Justin Leu - drums (2005–2006)
- Chris Pulis - guitar (2005-2006)
- Ryan Conley - drums (1998–2021) (also was in Oh, Sleeper)
- Matt Lucas - guitar (1998–2021)
- James Erwin - guitar/vocals (2001–2021) (also was in Oh, Sleeper and At Night We Strike)
- Lucas Starr - bass (2002–2005, died 2018) (also was in As Cities Burn, Oh, Sleeper, and At Night We Strike)
- Kevin McCauley - bass (1998–2002)
- Landon Cabarubio - bass (2021)

== Discography ==
As Letter Twelve

- Letter Twelve EP (2002)
- The Antecedent Me (2004)

As Terminal

- How the Lonely Keep (2005, Tooth & Nail Records)
