= Wasteland (Wolves at the Gate album) =

Studio album by Wolves at the Gate
- Released: May 30, 2025
- Genres: Christian metal; metalcore; post-hardcore
- Length: 35:45
- Label: Solid State
- Producers: Steve Cobucci; Josh Gilbert

Wolves at the Gate chronology
Eulogies (2022)	Wasteland (2025)	Borderland (2027)

Singles from Wasteland
- 1. "Parasite" Released: March 6, 2025; 2. "Synthetic Sun" Released: March 28, 2025; 3. "Law of the Wasteland" Released: April 18, 2025; 4. "Death Clock" Released: May 9, 2025

Wasteland is the sixth studio album by American metalcore band Wolves at the Gate. It was produced by guitarist/vocalist Steve Cobucci and ex-As I Lay Dying member and Spiritbox bassist Josh Gilbert, and released on May 30, 2025, by Solid State Records. It is a concept album that "follows a man named Jess in a dystopian wasteland, who is searching for someone at all costs."

== Background ==
The album was first teased in April 2024, when the band posted a picture on Instagram of Steve Cobucci and Josh Gilbert in the studio. In March 2025, the band released the first single for the album, "Parasite", which was followed by a second single, "Synthetic Sun". The band released two more singles, "Law of the Wasteland" and "Death Clock", before releasing the album on May 30, 2025.

== Reception ==
Professional ratings
Review scores
Source	Rating
Blabbermouth.net	8.5/10
Boolin Tunes	7/10
Jesus Freak Hideout	4/5 stars
New Noise Magazine	5/5 stars

The album has been critically well received, with Melissa Azevedo of Music Scene Media saying "Wolves At The Gate consistently demonstrate how heavy music can carry both an emotional, thunderous sound and spiritual meanings all in one. Their latest release isn't just another showcase of the band's artistic evolution but also a bold expression of identity that dives deep into a compelling, crushing sound and heartfelt lyricism. An album that's worth every listen from start to finish." Jesus Freak Hideout's John Amos said that "Overall, I really enjoy Wasteland, but it did take a number of listens for it to click for me. Don't be surprised if there's more to the story as the last line of album closer bids the Jess character, 'Come out the wasteland into the Borderland.'"

== Track listing ==
All tracks are written by Wolves at the Gate, Ryan Leitru and Josh Gilbert.

Wasteland track listing
No.	Title	Length
1.	"INT(r)O" (interlude)	1:23
2.	"The Wasteland (PAIN)"	2:36
3.	"PARASITE"	3:56
4.	"SYNTHETIC SUN"	3:30
5.	"Wandering" (interlude)	1:21
6.	"LAW OF THE (Waste) LAND"	3:27
7.	"SMOKE (False Devils)"	3:54
8.	"Withering" (interlude)	2:00
9.	"DEATH CLOCK"	4:14
10.	"Wasting" (interlude)	0:27
11.	"MEMENTO MORI"	3:25
12.	"Wanting" (interlude)	0:41
13.	"UNREST"	4:53
Total length:		35:45

== Personnel ==
Wolves at the Gate

- Nick Detty – lead vocals, keyboards
- Joey Alarcon – lead guitar
- Steve Cobucci – rhythm guitar, clean vocals, production, engineering
- Ben Summers – bass, backing vocals
- Abishai Collingsworth – drums

Additional Personnel

- Josh Gilbert – production
- Joseph McQueen – mixing, mastering, engineering
- Darren King – engineering
- Josh Hart – photography
