= VxV =

Studio album by Wolves at the Gate
- Released: June 10, 2014
- Genres: Christian metal; post-hardcore; metalcore
- Length: 46:32
- Label: Solid State
- Producers: Will Putney; Randy LeBoeuf

Wolves at the Gate chronology
| Captors (2012) | VxV (2014) | Types & Shadows (2016) |

VxV (read as Five by Five) is the second studio album by American metalcore band Wolves at the Gate. It was released on June 10, 2014 by Solid State Records. The album charted at No. 134 on the Billboard 200.

== Background ==
The album is the follow-up to the debut album Captors that released in 2012 by Solid State Records. Speaking with Reel Gospel, vocalist Steve Cobucci explained the album title is based on a military rating on signal strength and clarity, with a five by five rating being the best. He went on to state that they believe the gospel message to be the "five by five" that the band can give.

== Composition ==
The music has been referred to as "post-hardcore and metal goodness", and "competent metalcore and post-hardcore." Also, some reviewers note the religiosity to the material on the album because "The conviction that the group brings out in their spiritual lyrics invigorates all other aspect of their music."

Some have even went as so far as to say, the band are comparable to Underoath because the music contains "intricate guitars and anthemic choruses." Furthermore, the music might be appealing to some Thrice and Thursday fans due to the "post-hardcore leanings" of the material.

== Reception ==
Professional ratings
Review scores
| Source | Rating |
|---|---|
| AllMusic | 3.5/5 stars |
| Big Cheese | 8/10 |
| CCM Magazine | 3/5 stars |
| Exclaim! | 6/10 |
| HM Magazine | 4/5 stars |
| Indie Vision Music | 5/5 stars |
| Jesus Freak Hideout | 4.5/5 stars 4/5 stars |
| New Release Tuesday | 4/5 stars |
| Substream Magazine | 3.5/5 stars 4.5/5 stars |

VxV was met with generally positive reception from music critics. Anthony Bryant of HM Magazine rated the album four stars out of five, writing how "Wolves at the Gate has put together a worthy blend of melodic songs [...] with heart-pounding jammers [...] for a stellar release." At New Release Tuesday, Mary Nikkel rated the album four stars out of five, saying how "VxV is theologically dense and gospel-centric, emphasizing calls to repentance and redemption, frequently using strong scriptural imagery and voice overs to achieve an even stronger presentation." In addition, Nikkel observes how "The album's strength lies in its urgency, setting scruples aside in favor of raw writing focused on our desperate need for a desperately loving Savior." Brody B. of Indie Vision Music rated the album a perfect five stars, saying how the release "finds them more focused and spiritual than ever", and calls "The combination of powerful lyrics and intricate musicianship is a reckoning force." Katie Evans, writing for Big Cheese, rated the album an eight out of ten, for its enormity as "an album which sticks around way longer [than when] the stereo plays out" calling it a "certified deal clincher."

At Jesus Freak Hideout, main reviewer Michael Weaver rated the album four-and-a-half stars, Mark Rice in his second opinion and Scott Fryberger in the 2 Cents review rated the album four stars out of five. Weaver states how the band have surpassed their debut Captors, yet still does not understand if the band is operating at "the peak of their potential, it is clearly evident that they are at least one step closer to reaching it" Rice indicates how "Every song is absolutely enjoyable, high-quality, and great fun to listen to just by themselves." Fryberger remarks how "Nothing really sticks out after repeat listens, but those listens are still rather enjoyable."

At Substream Magazine, Tim Dodderidge rated the album four-and-a-half stars, explaining how "passion invades every cell" of the band that "represents their faith being loud and clear, depicts the musicians as they as they are on the record; unyielding Christ followers". In addition, Dodderidge notes that "VxV is loud and clear in everything it does, and with substantiality comes a standout release for the metal players." Anthony Glaser of Substream Magazine rated the album three-and-a-half stars out of five, and according to him even though "it includes a clever allegory involving a shortsighted bird and a manipulative snake, much of VxV is standard religious fare", which "is largely a reiteration of beliefs expressed by the devout worldwide." At Exclaim!, Bradley Zorgdrager rated the album a six out of ten, indicating how the band with respect to the music are "certainly not surpassing them [secular peers] yet; it's a solid state, but not an impenetrable one." The three star review by CCM Magazine's Matt Conner was rationalized as "The latest album from Solid State staple Wolves at the Gate shows impressive growth since the band's last LP."

== Commercial performance ==
For the Billboard charting week of June 28, 2014, VxV charted at No. 134 according to the Billboard 200. It charted at No. 6 in the Christian Albums market, and it sold enough to chart at No. 41 on the Top Rock Albums chart. In addition, the subgenre rock chart Hard Rock Albums the album sold enough to chart at No. 13, and in the Independent Albums segment of the music market it charted at No. 25.

== Track listing ==
All tracks are written by Wolves at the Gate

| No. | Title | Length |
|---|---|---|
| 1. | "VxV" | 0:47 |
| 2. | "Wake Up" | 3:15 |
| 3. | "Dust to Dust" | 3:02 |
| 4. | "Return" | 3:52 |
| 5. | "Relief" | 3:52 |
| 6. | "The Bird and the Snake" | 4:51 |
| 7. | "Rest" | 4:09 |
| 8. | "East to West" | 4:54 |
| 9. | "Wild Heart" | 3:34 |
| 10. | "The Convicted" | 3:29 |
| 11. | "Majesty in Misery" | 4:17 |
| 12. | "The Father's Bargain" | 6:30 |
| Total length: | | 46:32 |

== Charts ==
| Chart (2014) | Peak position |
|---|---|
| US Billboard 200 | 134 |
| US Top Christian Albums (Billboard) | 6 |
| US Top Hard Rock Albums (Billboard) | 13 |
| US Independent Albums (Billboard) | 25 |
| US Top Rock Albums (Billboard) | 41 |
