= Eclipse (Wolves at the Gate album) =

Studio album by Wolves at the Gate
- Released: July 26, 2019
- Genre: Christian metal; metalcore; post-hardcore
- Length: 49:54
- Label: Solid State
- Producer: Tim Lambesis; Steve Cobucci; Joey Alarcon

Wolves at the Gate chronology
Types & Shadows (2016)	Eclipse (2019)	Eulogies (2022)

Singles from Eclipse
- 1. "The Cure" Released: April 25, 2019; 2. "A Voice in the Violence" Released: May 17, 2019; 3. "Drifter" Released: June 13, 2019; 4. "Counterfeit" Released: July 12, 2019; 5. "Face to Face" Released: July 18, 2019

Eclipse is the fourth studio album by American metalcore band Wolves at the Gate. It was produced by Stephen Cobucci, Joey Alarcon, and Tim Lambesis, and released on July 26, 2019, by Solid State Records.

== Reception ==
Professional ratings
Review scores
Source	Rating
Distorted Sound Magazine	7/10
HM Magazine	4.5/5 stars

Eclipse received generally positive reviews, with Adam Cox of Metal Nexus saying that the album "brims with intent to be tuneful, thoughtful and emotional whilst retaining some brutal riffing."

== Track listing ==
All tracks are written by Wolves at the Gate.

No.	Title	Length
1.	"The Cure"	4:16
2.	"Face to Face"	3:49
3.	"A Voice in the Violence"	4:06
4.	"Drifter"	3:59
5.	"Enemy"	3:17
6.	"Evil Are the Kings"	3:35
7.	"Eclipse"	4:27
8.	"Response"	4:04
9.	"History"	3:38
10.	"The Sea in Between"	4:09
11.	"Alone"	3:52
12.	"Counterfeit"	2:52
13.	"Blessings & Curses"	3:49
Total length:		49:54

== Personnel ==
Wolves at the Gate

- Nick Detty – lead vocals, keyboards
- Joey Alarcon – lead guitar, production, engineering
- Steve Cobucci – rhythm guitar, clean vocals, production, engineering
- Ben Summers – bass, backing vocals
- Abishai Collingsworth – drums

Additional personnel

- Tim Lambesis – production, engineering
- Brandon Ebel – executive production
- Mike Watts and Dominic Nastasi – drum engineering, drum pre-production
- Taylor Larson – mixing, mastering
- Ernie Slenkovich – mixing
- Cory Hadje and Royal Division Entertainment – management
- Adam Skatula – A&R
- Ryan Clark – artwork, design

== Charts ==
Chart (2019)	Peak position
US Christian Albums	4
US Hard Rock Albums	23
US Independent Albums	10
