= Total Brutal =

Studio album by Austrian Death Machine
- Released: July 22, 2008
- Genre: Crossover thrash, metalcore, parody music, thrash metal
- Length: 38:28
- Label: Metal Blade
- Producer: Tim Lambesis, Adam Dutkiewicz

Austrian Death Machine chronology
Total Brutal (2008)	A Very Brutal Christmas (2008)

Professional ratings
Review scores
Source	Rating
AllMusic	3/5 stars

Total Brutal is the debut full-length album by Austrian Death Machine, a project of As I Lay Dying's vocalist Tim Lambesis. The band and record are based upon Arnold Schwarzenegger and his movies. Tim plays all of the instruments (apart from guest solo guitar work) and performs vocals but "Ahhhnold" is billed as the vocalist. Destroy the Runner vocalist Chad Ackerman voices all of the Schwarzenegger impersonations. The album was released on July 22, 2008. On the cover of the original release of the album "Machine" was spelled with two 'i's, while new pressings of the album have the spelling corrected.

== Track list ==
No.	Title	Film	Length
1.	"Hello California"		1:25
2.	"Get to the Choppa"	Predator	2:47
3.	"Rubber Baby Buggy Bumpers"	Last Action Hero	2:23
4.	"All of the Songs Sound the Same"		0:13
5.	"I Am a Cybernetic Organism, Living Tissue Over (Metal) Endoskeleton"	Terminator 2: Judgment Day	3:34
6.	"Come with Me If You Want to Live"	Terminator 2: Judgment Day	3:46
7.	"What It's Like to Be a Singer at Band Practice"		1:18
8.	"Who Is Your Daddy, And What Does He Do?"	Kindergarten Cop	3:11
9.	"You Have Just Been Erased"	Eraser	2:21
10.	"Broo-Tall Song Idea"		0:39
11.	"Here Is Subzero, Now Plain Zero"	The Running Man	3:08
12.	"So Far, So Good, So Let's Talk About It"	reference to the Megadeth album So Far, So Good... So What!	0:42
13.	"Screw You (Benny)"	Total Recall	2:49
14.	"Why?"	reference to Terminator 2: Judgment Day	0:25
15.	"If It Bleeds, We Can Kill It"	Predator	3:43
16.	"It's Not a Tumor"	Kindergarten Cop	3:16
17.	"Not So Hidden Track"		2:49

== Personnel ==
Austrian Death Machine

- Tim Lambesis (of As I Lay Dying) – vocals, guitar, bass, drums, trumpet, keyboards
- Chad Ackerman (of Destroy the Runner) – Schwarzenegger impersonation vocals

Guest musicians

- Jason Suecof (of Capharnaum) – tracks 2 & 13
- Mark MacDonald (of Mercury Switch) – tracks 3, 9, & 16
- Dan Fitzgerald – track 5
- Adam Dutkiewicz (of Killswitch Engage) – track 6
- Nick Hipa (of As I Lay Dying) – track 8
- Eyal Levi & Emil Werstler (of Dååth) – track 11
- Jason Barnes (formerly of Haste the Day) – track 15
- Sal Lococo (of Sworn Enemy) – guest vocals as The Predator on track 15
- JP Gericke – additional guitars
- Btown – fill in drums
- Mike Catalano (of Destroy the Runner) – additional percussion on track 6
- Jerad Buckwalter (of Sworn Enemy) – additional cymbals on track 6
- Joey St. Lucas, Meggan Lambesis, Duane Reed (of Destroy the Runner) & Marc Kohlbry (formerly of Destroy the Runner) – group vocals on track 6
- Josh Gilbert (of As I Lay Dying) – guest vocals on track 5
