= Josh Gilbert (musician) =

American bassist

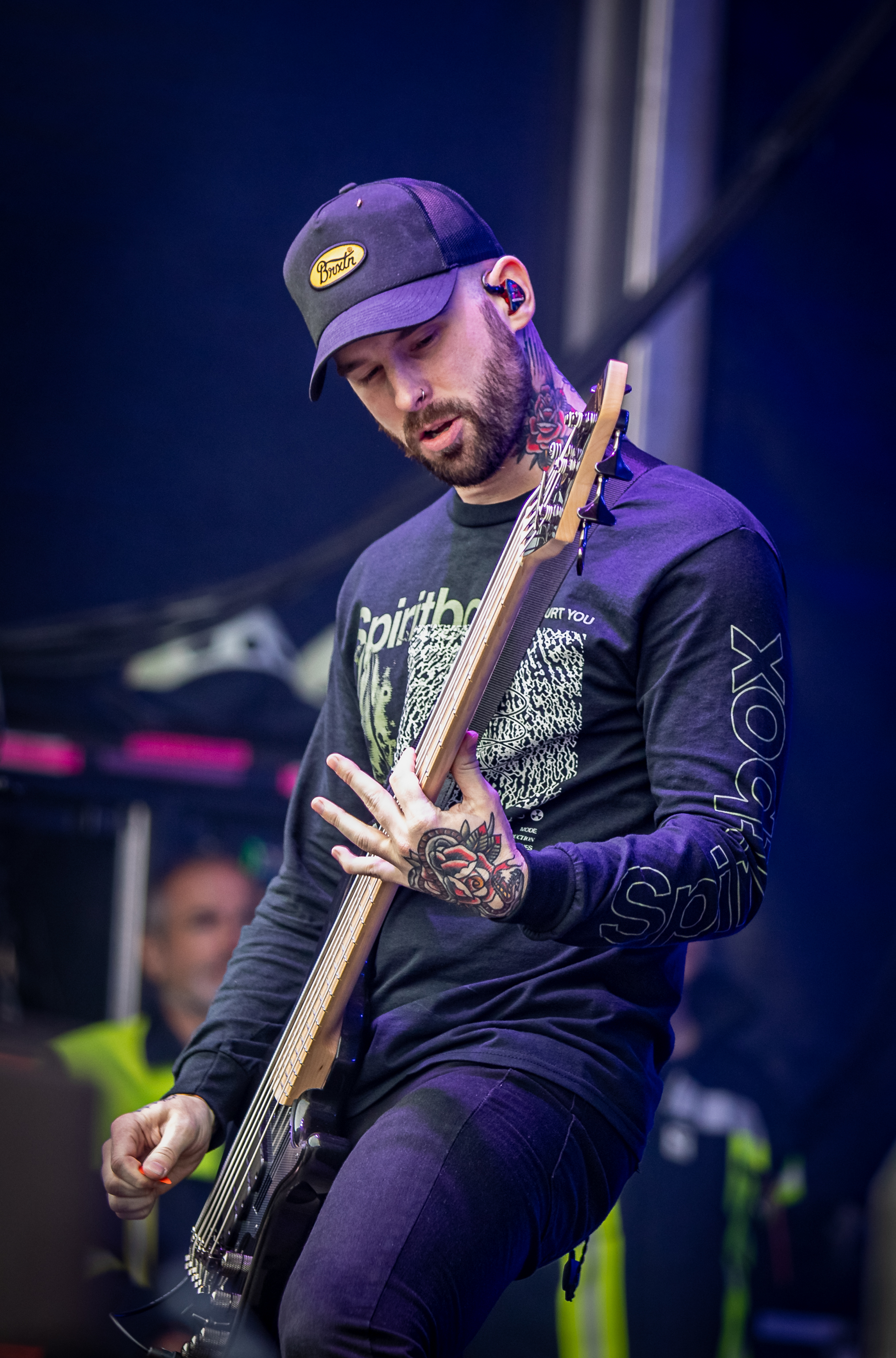
- Gilbert performing with Spiritbox in 2022

Background information
- Born: Joshua Kyle Gilbert; March 17, 1987 (age 39)
- Origin: Birmingham, Alabama, U.S.
- Genres: Metalcore; Christian metal; thrash metal; alternative metal; hard rock
- Occupations: Musician; record producer; songwriter
- Instruments: Bass; vocals
- Years active: 2003–present
- Member of: Spiritbox
- Formerly of: As I Lay Dying; Mothra (Gate City); This Endearing; Wovenwar; Year One

Joshua Kyle Gilbert (born March 17, 1987) is an American musician who performs primarily metalcore. He currently performs bass as a member of Spiritbox. He has played with several acts, and first became known for his former role in As I Lay Dying. After their initial breakup, he formed Wovenwar with other members of As I Lay Dying. He is also a contributor to Alternative Press.

== Career ==
Gilbert's musical career began with his first band Mothra in Birmingham, Alabama. Shortly after, they changed their name to This Endearing, and sent a demo to Tim Lambesis, frontman of As I Lay Dying. This Endearing disbanded in 2006 and Gilbert went on to join As I Lay Dying. Gilbert was As I Lay Dying's bassist from 2006 until 2014, when Lambesis was arrested. Before Lambesis' arrest, Gilbert performed in two of Lambesis' side-projects, Austrian Death Machine and Pyrithion. For the Pyrithion EP, Gilbert contributed bass as a session musician as well as JP Andrade on drums, with the official members being, Lambesis, Ryan Glissen (formerly of Allegaeon), and Andrew Godwin (formerly of Embodyment and The Famine). With Austrian Death Machine, Gilbert performed vocals on the two albums, Total Brutal and Double Brutal, and performed bass for the live band.

After Lambesis' arrest, the remaining members of AILD, guitarists Nick Hipa and Phil Sgrosso, and drummer Jordan Mancino formed Wovenwar. It was assumed that Gilbert was originally the vocalist, though it was later discovered that though he was, the primary vocalist was Shane Blay. After AILD went on hiatus, the band was approached by Brian Slagel, Metal Blade Records owner. The band has released two albums, Wovenwar (2014) and Honor Is Dead (2016).

Lambesis spent time in prison during Wovenwar's original run, and was released from prison in December 2016. After several meetings among the band members, Gilbert and his bandmates re-formed As I Lay Dying. Gilbert's reunion with the band was short-lived, as he made a final exit from the group on May 16, 2022, after creating only one album in their reunion. Less than a week later, it was announced that he would be filling in as bassist for Spiritbox during their 2022 shows. It was announced he had joined the band full-time on April 12, 2023.

Gilbert also performed in a project called Year One, together with Lee Turner, former bandmate and former drummer of Maylene and the Sons of Disaster, All In and This Endearing members Clayton Graves, Joseph McQueen, as well as Marko Gorupic of Legion and My Reply. In addition to touring full time with As I Lay Dying, he also co-owns and operates recording studio Sparrow Sound with his business partner Joseph McQueen out of Los Angeles.

Gilbert has also written/co-written for the likes of Bullet for My Valentine – "Venom" and "Skin" (2015), Light the Torch – Revival (2018) and Stitched Up Heart.

== Bands ==
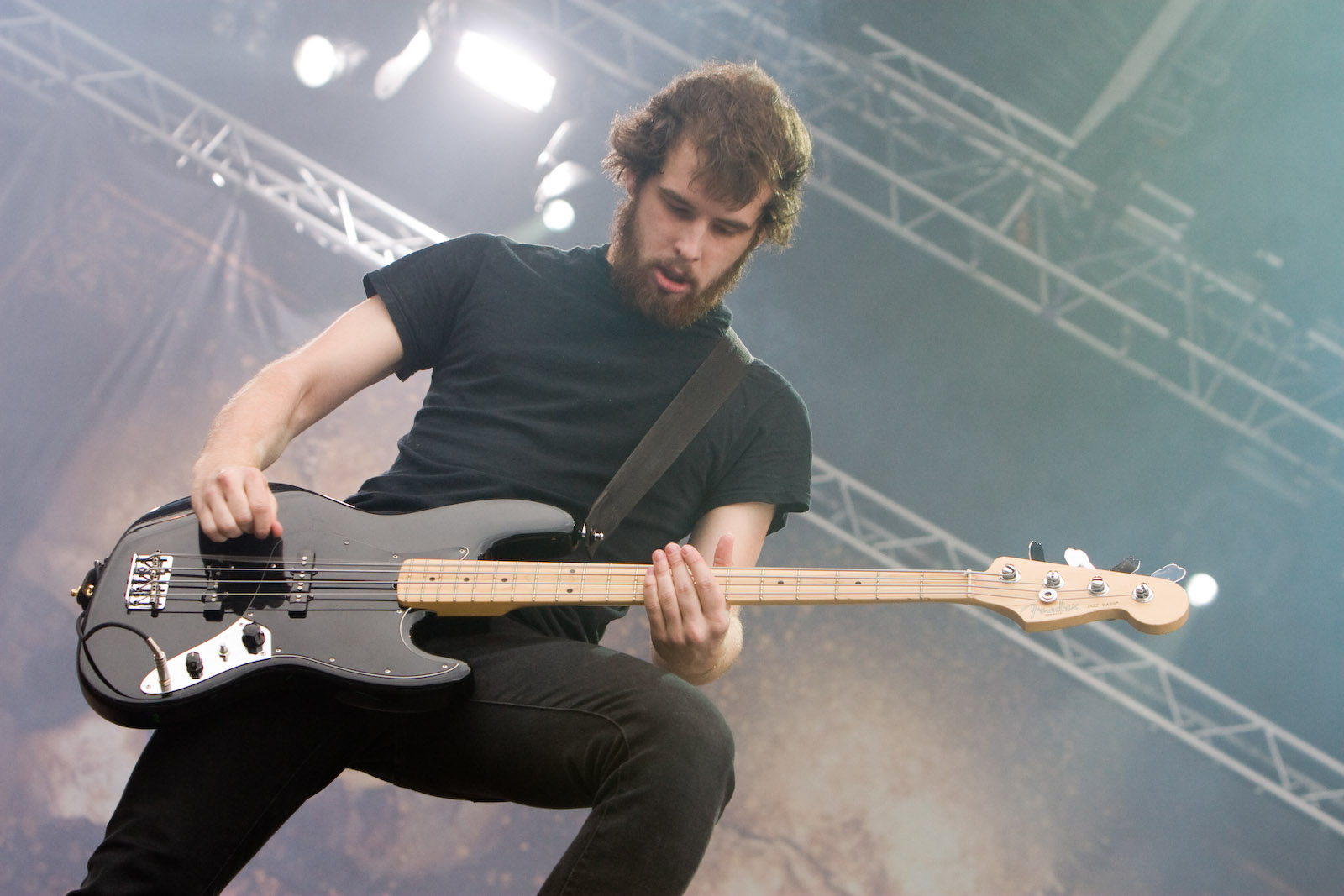
Gilbert performing with As I Lay Dying at With Full Force 2007

Current

- Spiritbox (Touring 2022–2023; full-time member 2023–present)

Former

- Mothra (Gate City) (2003–2005)
- This Endearing (2005–2007)
- Year One (2010–2013)
- Wovenwar (2013–2018)
- As I Lay Dying (2006–2014, 2018–2022)

Live

- Austrian Death Machine (2009–2014)

Session

- Pyrithion (2013)
- The End of an Age (2015)
- Light the Torch (2018)
- Ghost Atlas (2018)

== Discography ==
As I Lay Dying

- An Ocean Between Us (2007)
- The Powerless Rise (2010)
- Decas (compilation, 2011)
- Awakened (2012)
- Shaped by Fire (2019)

Spiritbox

- The Fear of Fear (2023)
- Tsunami Sea (2025)

Wovenwar

- Wovenwar (2014)
- Honor Is Dead (2016)

Session

- Pyrithion (2013) – Pyrithion
- Times Are Lost (2015) – The End of an Age
- Sleep Therapy: An Acoustic Performance (2018) – Ghost Atlas
- Revival (2018) – Light the Torch

Guest performances

- Total Brutal (2008) and Double Brutal (2009) – Austrian Death Machine
- Eternal (2010) – War of Ages
- Mechanical Weather (2012) – A Tragedy in Progress
- "Afloat on Hope" (2013) – Heroes for Tonight
- "Aura" (2023) – Oni
- "Take This to My Grave" (2024) – Seven Cities Dead

As producer

- Bad Wolves – Dear Monsters (2021)
- Oni – The Silver Line (2023)
- Bad Wolves – Die About It (2023)
- Wolves at the Gate – Wasteland (2025)
