= Son of the Morning (album) =

Studio album by Oh, Sleeper
- Released: August 25, 2009
- Recorded: 2009 at Planet Red Studios, Richmond, Virginia
- Genre: Metalcore
- Length: 33:55
- Label: Solid State
- Producer: Andreas Lars Magnusson

Oh, Sleeper chronology
When I Am God (2007)	Son of the Morning (2009)	Children of Fire (2011)

Professional ratings
Review scores
Source	Rating
Hearwax Media	(5.8/10)
Bring On Mixed Reviews	4.5/5 stars
BLARE Magazine	3.5/5 stars
Jesus Freak Hideout	4.5/5 stars

Son of the Morning is the second studio album by American metalcore band Oh, Sleeper. It was released on August 25, 2009, through Solid State Records.

== Background and concept ==
Son of the Morning was recorded in 2009 at Planet Red Studios in Richmond, Virginia. The album is a concept album based on the epic battle between Satan and Jesus. Described by Kinard, the lyrics to the title track are The Devil calling out with threats to Jesus and the chorus to the song is Christ's reply. The rest of the album as follows is based on Jesus talking to people of the earth and gathering upon angels before reaching the final track "The Finisher" wherein Jesus prevails in banishing Satan and cuts off his horns.

=== Cover art ===
The cover for the album is known as a "broken pentagram". It follows exactly the same design as an inverted pentagram, but with the horns atop of it missing hence the final line of lyrics on the album. The broken pentagram was designed by the band and, since the release of Son of the Morning, it has become their trademark symbol.

== Track listing ==
All lyrics are written by Micah Kinard except where noted; all music is composed by Oh, Sleeper.

No.	Title	Lyrics	Length
1.	"Son of the Morning"		3:24
2.	"The New Breed"		3:47
3.	"In All Honesty" (featuring Cody Bonnette of As Cities Burn)		3:55
4.	"Breathing Blood"		4:10
5.	"Reveries of Flight"	Micah Kinard and Shane Blay	2:37
6.	"World Without a Sun"		2:25
7.	"The Fire Dawn"		3:32
8.	"A Banquet for Traitors"		3:12
9.	"Commissioned by Kings"		3:42
10.	"The Finisher"		3:04
Total length:			33:55

== Personnel ==
Oh, Sleeper

- Micah Kinard - lead vocals, additional guitar
- Shane Blay - lead guitar, clean vocals
- James Erwin - rhythm guitar
- Lucas Starr - bass guitar
- Matt Davis - drums

Production

- Produced by Andreas Magnusson
