= Children of Fire =

Studio album by Oh, Sleeper
- Released: September 6, 2011
- Recorded: February 21 – Summer 2011
- Studio: Planet Red Studios, Richmond, Virginia; Machine Shop Studios, Weehawken, New Jersey
- Genre: Metalcore
- Length: 36:44
- Label: Solid State
- Producer: Andreas Magnusson

Oh, Sleeper chronology
Son of the Morning (2009)	Children of Fire (2011)	The Titan EP (2013)

Singles from Children of Fire
- 1. "Endseekers" Released: September 6, 2011; 2. "Hush Yael" Released: September 8, 2011; 3. "Children of Fire" Released: January 7, 2012

Professional ratings
Review scores
Source	Rating
Indie Vision Music	5/5
Jesus Freak Hideout	4.5/5 stars
Pop Matters	5/10
Sputnik Music	5/5

Children of Fire is the third album made by the American metalcore band, Oh, Sleeper. It was released on September 6, 2011, in the United States through Solid State Records. Produced by Andreas Magnusson, the first and only single was "Endseekers" released on September 6, 2011, available on iTunes and the official music video is available on YouTube.

The album cover features the band logo, the broken pentagram with a child inside of it. It is the band's last album for almost eight years, with their next album, Bloodied/Unbowed, being released in 2019.

== Concept ==
Children of Fire tells a post-apocalyptic story set in the aftermath of the battle between God and Satan. At the end of the previous album, Son of the Morning, God severed Satan's horns; as Children of Fire begins, Satan's horns have fallen to the ground, and both God and Satan vanish. Humanity is left believing that God and Satan are both dead; thus, now there is no fear of Hell or reward of Heaven.

Children of Fire focuses on two characters - a devout Christian father whose faith unravels after believing God and Satan have died, and his daughter, who begins the album as an atheist. The daughter is left searching for answers after witnessing the battle between two figures she never believed in, and eventually speaks to a group of believers who answer her questions and lead her to believe that God is neither dead nor as violent as she thought. At the end of the album, Earth is destroyed, but the daughter finds solace in her newfound faith and knows she will be fulfilled in Heaven.

=== Historical tracks ===
Oh, Sleeper wrote two songs that are based on past murders. The fourth track, "Hush Yael," narrates the story of Samir Kuntar and the murders that he committed at the age of 16. The sixth track, "Dealers of Fame," is a first-person narrative telling of the Dnepropetrovsk maniacs, who are infamous for their leaked online video that depicts their torture of an elderly man in a forest.

== Track listing ==
All lyrics are written by Micah Kinard, except where noted; all music is composed by Oh, Sleeper.

No.	Title	Lyrics	Length
1.	"Endseekers"		3:06
2.	"Shed Your Soul"		2:36
3.	"The Marriage of Steel and Skin"		2:56
4.	"Hush Yael"		4:29
5.	"The Conscience Speaks"		1:13
6.	"Dealers of Fame"		2:57
7.	"Means to Believe"	Shane Blay, Micah Kinard	3:14
8.	"In the Wake of Pigs"		3:10
9.	"Claws of a God"		2:42
10.	"The Family Ruin"		3:31
11.	"Chewing the Stitch"		3:08
12.	"Children of Fire"		3:29
Total length:			36:44

== Chart performance ==
Chart (2011)	Peak position
US Billboard 200	142
US Top Christian Albums (Billboard)	7
US Top Hard Rock Albums (Billboard)	8
US Top Rock Albums (Billboard)	32

== Personnel ==
Oh, Sleeper

- Micah Kinard – lead vocals, programming
- Shane Blay – lead guitar, clean vocals
- James Erwin – rhythm guitar
- Nate Grady – bass guitar
- Zac Mayfield – drums

Production

- Andreas Lars Magnusson – producer
- Scott Bradford – legal counsel
- Ryan Clark – design
- Chris Dowen – production assistant
- Troy Glessner – mastering
- Jerad Knudson – photography
- Machine – mixing
- Brandon Day – A&R
