= Bloodied / Unbowed =

Studio album by Oh, Sleeper
- Released: July 12, 2019
- Recorded: 2016–2018
- Genre: Metalcore
- Length: 40:13
- Label: Solid State
- Producer: Andreas Magnusson

Oh, Sleeper chronology
The Titan EP (2013)	Bloodied / Unbowed (2019)	Back to the Wild (2027)

Singles from Bloodied / Unbowed
- 1. "Oxygen" Released: December 15, 2016; 2. "Decimation & Burial" Released: November 30, 2018; 3. "Fissure" Released: May 17, 2019; 4. "The Island" Released: June 27, 2019

Bloodied / Unbowed is the fourth studio album by American metalcore band Oh, Sleeper, and their first full-length album since Children of Fire (2011). Originally announced for release in mid-2017, it was eventually released on July 12, 2019, through Solid State Records after the 2013 independent release of The Titan EP.

== Concept ==
Similarly to the band's previous albums, Bloodied / Unbowed (named for a line from the poem "Invictus") largely follows a conceptual storyline, set 30 years after the Titan EP and meant to mirror singer Shane Blay's departure from the band and singer Micah Kinard's hiatus from music while Blay was in Wovenwar. Blay and Kinard play two soldiers, one who believes they can't make a difference in the world (Blay) and one who wants to keep trying to (Kinard). Kinard's character starts a mutiny on his ship and runs it aground on an island while Blay's character returns to fill his role in the army; Kinard dismantles his ship for firewood and builds his own home and kingdom, but every time he completes his work, a volcano on the island erupts and destroys everything. Kinard eventually returns to fight alongside Blay and the two feel stronger than ever as a unit.

== Track listing ==
All lyrics are written by Micah Kinard; all music is composed by Oh, Sleeper.

No.	Title	Length
1.	"Let It Wave"	3:37
2.	"Decimation & Burial"	3:31
3.	"Fissure"	4:03
4.	"Of Bane & Disease"	4:45
5.	"Two Ships"	5:05
6.	"The Island"	5:05
7.	"Mutinous"	3:20
8.	"Pulse Over Throne"	2:55
9.	"Oxygen"	3:26
10.	"The Summit"	4:26
Total length:		40:13

== Personnel ==
- Micah Kinard - lead vocals
- Shane Blay - guitars, bass, clean vocals
- Zac Mayfield - drums
