= The Titan (EP) =

The Titan EP

EP by Oh, Sleeper
- Released: July 2, 2013
- Recorded: Planet Red Studios, Richmond, Virginia
- Genre: Metalcore
- Length: 19:38
- Label: Independent
- Producer: Andreas Lars Magnusson

Oh, Sleeper chronology
| Children of Fire (2011) | The Titan EP (2013) | Bloodied / Unbowed (2019) |

Professional ratings
Review scores
| Source | Rating |
|---|---|
| MusicReview.co.za | 3.75 stars on a 5 point scale |
| Jesusfreakhideout.com | 3.5/5 stars |

The Titan EP is an EP by the metalcore band Oh, Sleeper. It was released in 2013 independently after a successful crowd-funding effort on the website Indiegogo.

== Background and concept ==
The Titan EP was released independently by Oh, Sleeper with funding assistance via Indiegogo.

The EP follows a science fiction concept: the Titan corporation offers synthetic upgrades to both bodies and minds in exchange for a certain amount of time served working for Titan - for example, if one wants to become a doctor, they can purchase a brain upgrade from Titan and serve out the time in exchange. However, having one's upgrades serviced leads to more time added to one's time debt; the older one is, the less time they have available to pay with; and if someone with a time debt dies, their next of kin must take it on.

== Storyline ==
"Naofumi Mitsuhashi" is the first song on the EP, unrelated to the EP's transhumanist concept and named after the largest donor to the band's campaign.

The EP follows a young man who wants to be a pilot, but cannot as he was born blind. In "The Pitch", he is convinced by Titan to sign a 6-year time contract in exchange for new eyes. In "Death From Above", the protagonist joins Titan as a pilot and finishes out his contract by raiding a hideout of rogues resisting Titan. In "Heavy Hands", the protagonist's eyes malfunction and he is captured and tortured by the rogue augmentees for information; despite not talking, he is sent back to Titan as an example, and given a new heart in exchange for 18 more years on his contract; the rogues' words strike a chord with him and he begins to doubt his allegiance to Titan. Finally, in "The Rise", Titan is attacked by the rogues and the protagonist defies the corporation to escape with them, but he is recaptured when the corporation remotely deactivates his eyes. He declines an offer to join the rogues, as his eyes will always be compromised, but instead carves out his own eyes as an act of resistance with a knife given to him by the rogues.

== Track listing ==
All lyrics are written by Micah Kinard; all music is composed by Oh, Sleeper.

| No. | Title | Length |
|---|---|---|
| 1. | "Naofumi Mitsuhashi" | 2:58 |
| 2. | "The Pitch" (featuring Casey Sabol from Periphery) | 3:13 |
| 3. | "Death from Above" (featuring Jacky Vincent from Falling In Reverse) | 3:37 |
| 4. | "Heavy Hands" | 4:59 |
| 5. | "The Rise" | 4:52 |
| Total length: | | 19:38 |

== Personnel ==
- Micah Kinard - lead vocals
- Shane Blay - lead guitar, clean vocals
- Zac Mayfield - drums
- Nathan Grady - rhythm guitar, bass
- Produced by Oh, Sleeper and Andreas Lars Magnusson
- Engineered, mixed and mastered by Andreas Lars Magnusson, at Planet Red Studios, Richmond, Virginia
- Artwork by Pavlov Visuals
- Guest appearances:
  - Guest vocals on "The Pitch" performed by Casey Sabol
  - Guest guitar solo on "Death From Above" performed by Jacky Vincent
