= The Armored March =

EP by Oh, Sleeper
- Released: November 21, 2006
- Genre: Metalcore
- Length: 17:01
- Label: 1x1 Music

Oh, Sleeper chronology
The Armored March (2006)	When I Am God (2007)

Alternative cover

The Armored March is the first EP by Christian metal band Oh, Sleeper. It was released in 2006 through 1x1 Music. The year following its release, Oh, Sleeper signed to Solid State Records and all of the tracks included on the EP were re-recorded for their debut album When I Am God, which was released in 2007.

A music video was produced for the song "We Are the Archers".

== Track listing ==
All lyrics are written by Micah Kinard; all music is composed by Oh, Sleeper.

No.	Title	Length
1.	"To Flagship"	3:33
2.	"The End of a Dark Campaign (The Amputation)"	3:44
3.	"His Name Was Bishop"	3:11
4.	"The Siren's Song"	5:38
5.	"We Are the Archers"	3:59
Total length:		17:01

== Personnel ==
Oh, Sleeper

- Micah Kinard - lead vocals, programming
- Shane Blay - lead guitar, clean vocals
- James Erwin - rhythm guitar
- Lucas Starr - bass guitar
- Ryan Conley - drums
