= Wovenwar (album) =

Studio album by Wovenwar
- Released: August 5, 2014
- Recorded: 2013–2014
- Studio: The Blasting Room, Fort Collins, Colorado; Casa de Sgroz, Oceanside, California; Castleman Studios, Escondido, California; Echelon Studios, Burbank, California; Signature Sound, San Diego, California; The Gnextry Room, Oceanside, California
- Genre: Alternative metal; melodic metalcore; hard rock; heavy metal
- Length: 54:17
- Label: Metal Blade
- Producer: Wovenwar, Bill Stevenson, Jason Livermore

Wovenwar chronology
Wovenwar (2014)	Honor Is Dead (2016)

Singles from Wovenwar
- 1. "All Rise" Released: April 21, 2014; 2. "The Mason" Released: June 18, 2014; 3. "Death to Rights" Released: February 17, 2015

Professional ratings
Review scores
Source	Rating
AllMusic	3.5/5 stars
Blabbermouth.net	8/10
The Guardian	4/5 stars
Rock Sound	7/10
Sputnikmusic	4/5
Ultimate Guitar Archive	8.5/10

Wovenwar is the debut studio album by American metal band Wovenwar. Released on August 5, 2014, through Metal Blade Records, the album was produced by Bill Stevenson and mixed by Colin Richardson. The debut single, "All Rise", was released on April 21, 2014, followed by "The Mason" on June 18, 2014, and "Death to Rights" on February 17, 2015, with the latter single becoming the third most added song on active rock radio.

Wovenwar was generally well received by critics; at Metacritic, which assigns a normalized rating out of 100 to reviews from mainstream critics, the album received an average score of 71, based on 5 reviews. The album's musical style has been described as hard rock, alternative metal, melodic metalcore and modern heavy metal.

In mid-2014, the band performed with Black Label Society on their first North American tour. They accompanied In Flames later that year while they traveled Europe.

== Track listing ==
All tracks are written by Wovenwar.

No.	Title	Length
1.	"Foreword"	1:40
2.	"All Rise"	3:36
3.	"Death to Rights"	3:15
4.	"Tempest"	4:37
5.	"The Mason"	4:09
6.	"Moving Up"	3:51
7.	"Sight of Shore"	3:47
8.	"Father/Son"	3:50
9.	"Profane"	3:56
10.	"Archers" (featuring Micah Kinard)	3:18
11.	"Ruined Ends"	3:58
12.	"Identity"	4:16
13.	"Matter of Time"	3:39
14.	"Prophets"	4:50
15.	"Onward"	1:34
Total length:		54:17

== Personnel ==
Wovenwar

- Shane Blay – lead vocals, guitar
- Nick Hipa – lead guitar
- Phil Sgrosso – rhythm guitar, programming
- Josh Gilbert – bass, backing vocals, lead vocals (track 13)
- Jordan Mancino – drums

Production

- Produced by Wovenwar, Bill Stevenson and Jason Livermore
- Mastered by Ted Jensen at Sterling Sound, NYC
- Mixed by Colin Richardson, Joseph McQueen and Carl Bowen
- Vocal engineering by Bill Stevenson, Jason Livermore and Jason McQueen
- Guitar engineering by Phil Sgrosso, Nick Hipa and Daniel Castleman
- Drum and bass engineering by Bill Stevenson and Jason Livermore
- Studio assistant: Fernando Morales
- Booking by Nick Storch (ICM Talent, U.S.) and Paul Ryan (The Agency Group, International)
- Art direction and design by Ryan Clark (Invisible Creature)

== Chart performance ==
Chart (2014)	Peak position
US Billboard 200	36
US Billboard Digital Albums	25
US Billboard Independent Albums	3
US Billboard Rock Albums	13
US Billboard Hard Rock Albums	3
