= Wovenwar =

American metal band (2013–2018)

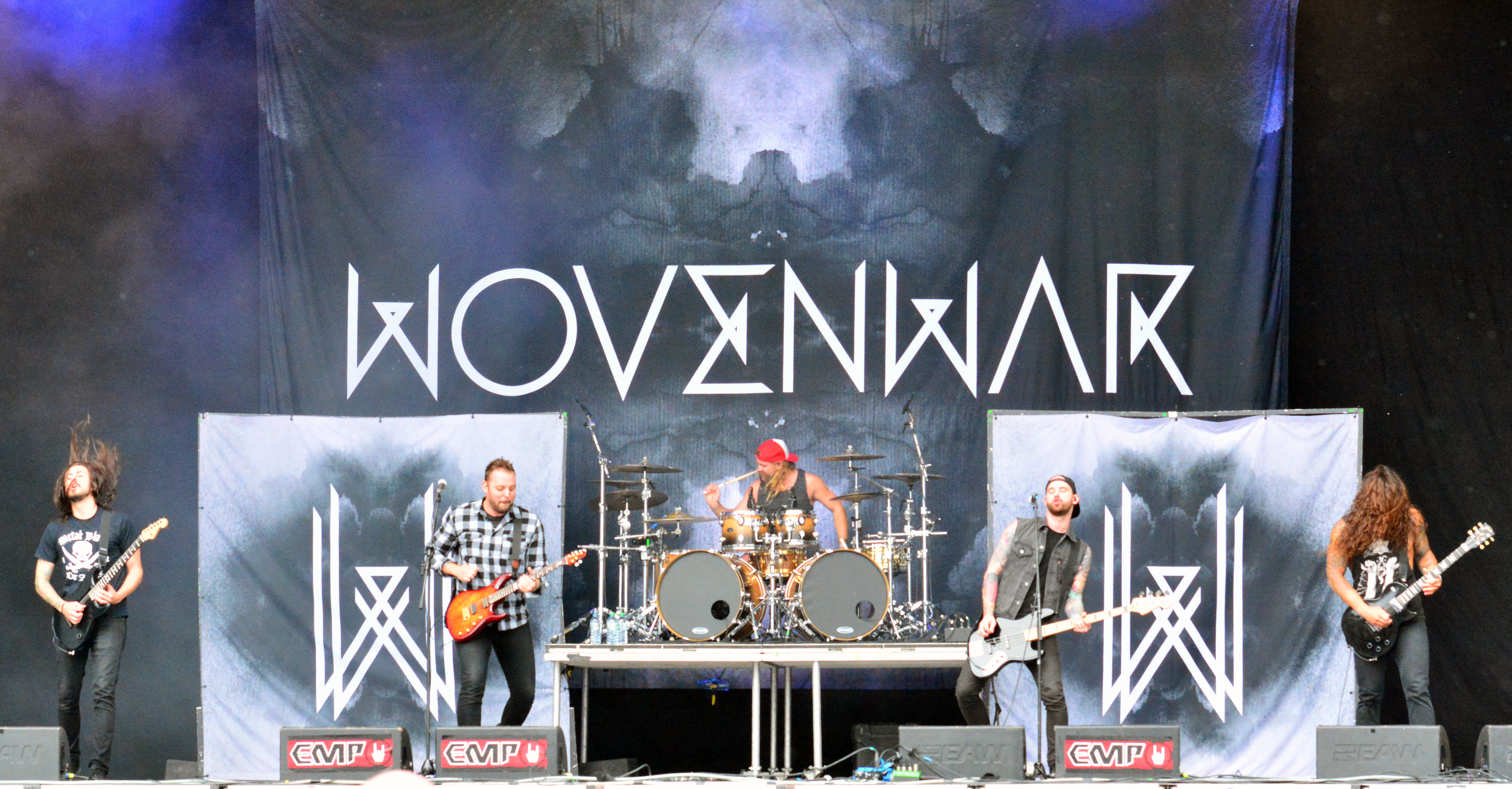
- Wovenwar in 2014. L-R: Phil Sgrosso, Shane Blay, Jordan Mancino, Josh Gilbert, Nick Hipa

Background information
- Origin: Southern California, U.S.
- Genres: Alternative metal; melodic metalcore; hard rock; heavy metal
- Years active: 2013–2018
- Label: Metal Blade
- Spinoff of: As I Lay Dying; Oh, Sleeper
- Past members: Shane Blay; Nick Hipa; Phil Sgrosso; Josh Gilbert; Jordan Mancino
- Website: wovenwar.com

Wovenwar was an American heavy metal band from Southern California, formed in 2013. They released their self-titled debut album in 2014. The band's musical style on the album has been described as alternative metal, melodic metalcore, hard rock, and modern heavy metal.

== History ==
In May 2013, As I Lay Dying frontman Tim Lambesis was arrested for soliciting the murder of his wife. The remaining members soon began experimenting and writing with guitarist Shane Blay of Oh, Sleeper. Lambesis' arrest negatively affected his relationships with As I Lay Dying, which resulted in the departure of all members except for Jordan Mancino, who had been sharing an ownership for the band's rights with Lambesis since 2006. After a short meeting, they decided to put discussions of the future of As I Lay Dying on hold.

From 2013 to 2014, the newly formed Wovenwar had been in the process of making a self-titled debut album with the producer Bill Stevenson. The mixing for the album was done by Colin Richardson. The band's debut single, "All Rise", was released on April 21, 2014. On June 18, 2014, the band released a second single from the album, titled "The Mason". The album itself was released on August 5, 2014, through Metal Blade Records. The third single of the album, "Death to Rights", was the third-most added song on active rock radio in late February 2015.

Wovenwar had played their first tour in the United States opening for Black Label Society from July 17, 2014, to August 4, 2014. The band had also been touring in Europe from September 27, 2014, to November 8, 2014, as a support for In Flames.

Wovenwar, among other acts, supported Periphery on their Juggernaut Tour in the U.S. from January 10, 2015, to February 14, 2015. From February 20, 2015, to March 18, 2015, Wovenwar and All That Remains were joining In Flames again, this time on their U.S. headline tour. From May 12, 2015, to May 25, 2015, Wovenwar returned to Europe as a special guest for Sylosis' headline tour. The band also played five of their own headline shows in the UK at the end of May 2015.

Wovenwar released its second studio album, Honor Is Dead, on October 21, 2016, through Metal Blade Records, which consisted of 11 tracks condensed from several months of demos. Guitarist Phil Sgrosso departed from the band right after finishing all his studio work for the album to focus more on his project, Poison Headache.

In 2018, all members, excluding Blay, returned to perform in As I Lay Dying. Blay would return to his own band, Oh, Sleeper, and both bands would release new albums in 2018 and 2019, respectively. However, by 2024 all of them had left As I Lay Dying once again.

== Band members ==
Final line-up

- Shane Blay – lead vocals, guitar (2013–2018)
- Nick Hipa – guitar (2013–2018)
- Josh Gilbert – bass, backing and lead vocals (2013–2018)
- Jordan Mancino – drums (2013–2018)

Former

- Phil Sgrosso – guitar, programming (2013–2016)

Timeline

== Discography ==
=== Studio albums ===
Title	Album details	Peak chart positions				
Title	Album details	US	US Hard Rock	US Indie	US Rock	US Digital
Wovenwar	Released: August 5, 2014; Label: Metal Blade Records; Format: CD, digital download	36	3	3	13	25
Honor Is Dead	Released: October 21, 2016; Label: Metal Blade Records; Format: CD, digital download	68	7	15	27	40
