= Oh, Sleeper =

American metalcore band

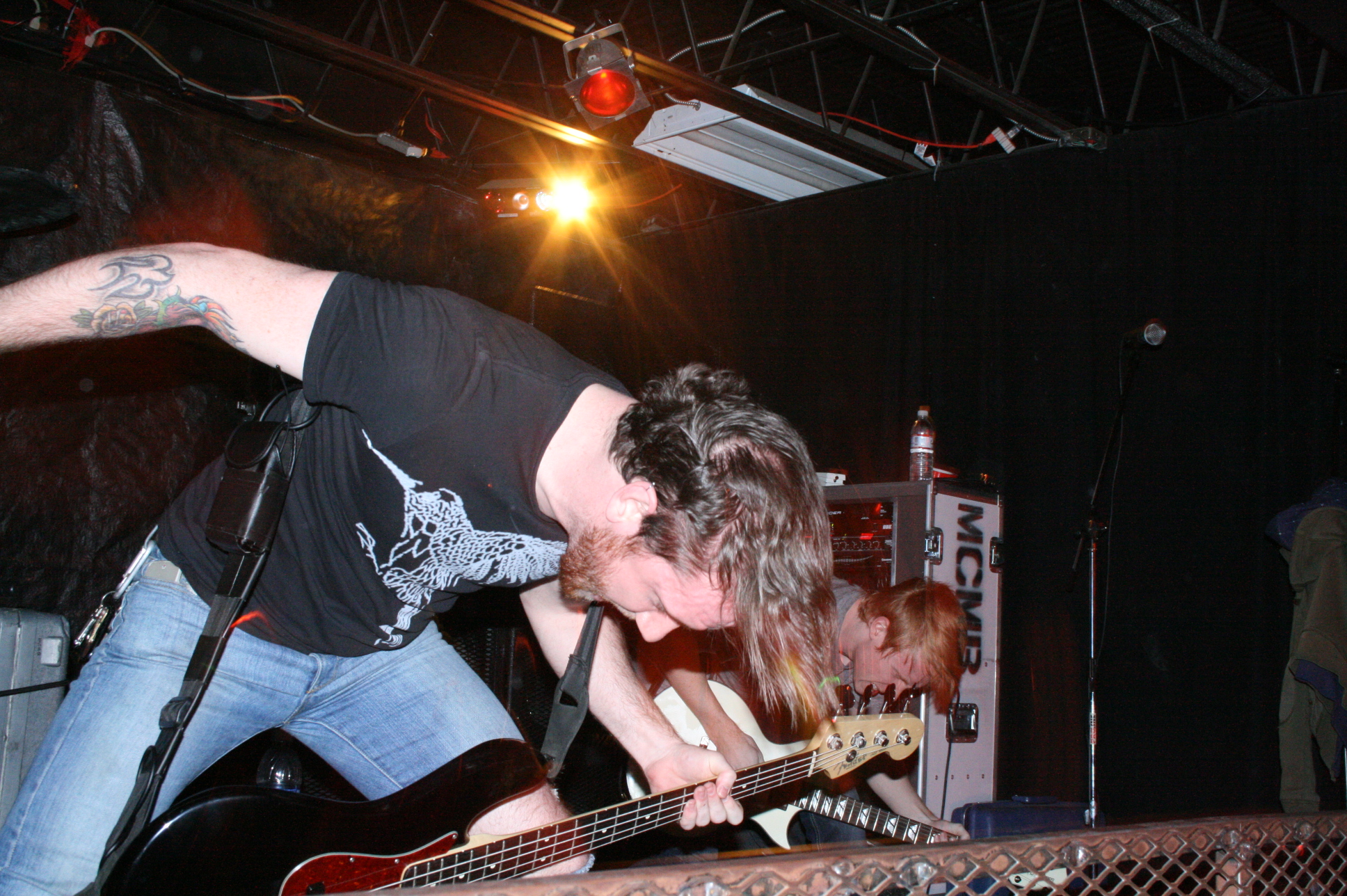
- Oh, Sleeper performing in 2007

Background information
- Origin: Fort Worth, Texas, U.S.
- Genre: Metalcore
- Years active: 2006–present (hiatus from 2019–2026)
- Label: Solid State
- Members: Shane Blay; Micah Kinard; Zac Mayfield; Seth Webster
- Past members: James Erwin; Lucas Starr; Ryan Conley; Matt Davis; Johno Erickson; Nathan Grady
- Website: ohsleeper.com

Oh, Sleeper is an American metalcore band from Fort Worth, Texas that formed in 2006 with former members of Terminal. In over a decade's span, Oh, Sleeper has released four full-length albums, two EPs, and toured worldwide as an opening act. After independently releasing The Titan EP and traveling in the full Van's Warped Tour 2013, the band went on hiatus to allow clean vocalist and lead guitarist Shane Blay to join As I Lay Dying members in starting California-based metal band Wovenwar. The band's fourth full-length album, Bloodied / Unbowed, was released on July 12, 2019.

== History ==
Oh, Sleeper was founded in April 2006 after Ryan Conley, former member of the rock band Terminal, got together with former Evelynn and Between the Buried and Me guitarist Shane Blay and former Terminal bassist Lucas Starr (who was at the time with As Cities Burn). Eventually they found a vocalist in Micah Kinard, formerly of Keeping Lions, and began practicing. The four members experienced typical problems of a band start-up (no place to practice, no money and different schedules), but the biggest obstacle was finding the final member. Countless awkward auditions failed to fill the missing position, until long time friend and fellow Terminal member James Erwin was found. After his addition to the lineup, the band released an EP, The Armored March, through 1x1 music.

The band signed with Solid State Records in mid-2007. Their debut album, When I Am God, was released on October 23, 2007. On December 28, 2007, Oh, Sleeper performed at the Plano Center in Plano, Texas along with the briefly reunited Terminal. Oh, Sleeper also supported Demon Hunter on their tour, along with Living Sacrifice, Advent, and The Famine. The tour in support of Norma Jean was drummer Ryan Conley's last with the band. Conley was replaced the following year by Matt Davis.

Son of the Morning was released on August 25, 2009 The first single from the record was the title track, "Son of the Morning" and later in the year, Oh, Sleeper played the entire album for the first time in Waco Texas at Art Ambush. The cover of Son of the Morning is known as a "broken pentagram", which has to be distinguished from the broken pentagram used by black magicians with only one triangle left. The symbol was designed by Ryan Clark of Demon Hunter and it follows the same pattern as a pentagram with the horns missing. The album debuted on the Billboard 200 at No. 120 and also charted at No. 46 on the Rock Albums chart, at No. 7 on the Christian Albums chart and at No. 12 on the Hard Rock Albums chart.

On February 23, 2011, Lucas Starr announced his departure from the band. He was replaced by Nate Grady who had filled in on tour the year before.

The first single from Children of Fire, "Endseekers", was released on August 2, 2011, while "Hush Yael" was uploaded to their Facebook page on August 23. The album itself was released digitally on September 6, 2011, and physically in stores on September 27.

In November 2012, rhythm guitarist James Erwin announced his departure from the band. It was subsequently announced that Nate Grady would switch from bass to rhythm guitar to take Erwin's position in the band. The band announced that Johno Erickson (formerly of Sky Eats Airplane) would fill-in on bass while touring with Fit for a King and in Directions as well as playing several other shows and festivals. Erickson's position was later made permanent.

In 2014, after the sentencing of As I Lay Dying's vocalist Tim Lambesis, the remaining members of the band recruited Shane Blay to be the vocalist in their new band, Wovenwar, and have completed work on their self-titled debut album which was released in the summer via Metal Blade Records.

The band released a single, "Oxygen", and announced that they would be releasing an album, Bloodied/Unbowed, in mid-2017. After some time, on November 30, 2018, the single "Decimation & Burial" was released, which marked their return to Solid State Records. On May 17, 2019, a third single entitled "Fissure" was released, along with an official release date and pre-orders for the new album. On June 27, 2019, their fourth single entitled "The Island" premiered on Altpress.com, and released on all streaming platforms June 28.

Former bassist and founding member Lucas Starr died of colon cancer at the age of 34 on December 7, 2018, four months after his stage four cancer diagnosis.

On November 20, 2026, the band ended their seven-year hiatus with the announcement that they will be releasing their fifth studio album, Back to the Wild, on April 16, 2027. The first single from the album, "Frontline Livin", was released on the same day as the announcement.

== Band members ==
Current

- Shane Blay – lead guitar, clean vocals (2006–present), rhythm guitar, bass (2016–2018)
- Micah Kinard – lead vocals (2006–present), rhythm guitar (2018–present), bass (2016–2018)
- Zac Mayfield – drums (2010–present)
- Seth Webster – bass, backing vocals (2018–present)

Former

- Ryan Conley – drums (2006–2008)
- Lucas Starr – bass, backing vocals (2006–2011, died 2018)
- James Erwin – rhythm guitar, backing vocals (2006–2012)
- Matt Davis – drums (2008–2010)
- Johno Erickson – bass (2012–2016)
- Nate Grady – bass (2011–2012), rhythm guitar (2012–2016), backing vocals (2011–2016)

Timeline

== Discography ==
=== Studio albums ===
Year	Title	Label	Chart peaks				
Year	Title	Label	US	US Heat	US Rock	US Hard Rock	Christian
2007	When I Am God	Solid State	—	19	—	—	33
2009	Son of the Morning	Solid State	120	7	46	12	7
2011	Children of Fire	Solid State	142	—	32	1	7
2019	Bloodied / Unbowed	Solid State	—	— (Note: Bloodied / Unbowed did not enter the Billboard Heatseekers Albums Chart, but peaked at No. 10 on the Billboard Independent Albums chart.)	—	—	6
2027	Back to the Wild	Solid State	—	—	—	—	—

EPs

- The Armored March (2006, 1x1)
- The Titan (2013, independent)
