= List of chiptune artists =

This is a list of chiptune artists. Bands are listed alphabetically by the first letter in their name, and individuals are listed by first name.

== 0-9 ==
- 4mat

== A ==
- Anamanaguchi
- Aivi & Surasshu

== C ==
- Chipzel
- Chris Huelsbeck
- Crying

== D ==
- DJ Cutman
- Dunderpatrullen

== F ==
- Toby Fox

== G ==
- Goto80

== H ==
- Horse the Band

== I ==
- I Fight Dragons

== J ==
- Jeroen Tel

== K ==
- Karate High School

== L ==
- LukHash

== M ==
- Maretu
- Math the Band

== N ==
- Nullsleep

== P ==
- Pixelh8

== R ==
- Rob Hubbard

== S ==
- she

== T ==
- Tim Follin
- Trash80

== W ==
- Watch Out For Snakes

== See also ==
- List of Nintendocore bands
