= List of UK Rock & Metal Singles Chart number ones of 2000 =

The UK Rock & Metal Singles Chart is a record chart which ranks the best-selling rock and heavy metal songs in the United Kingdom. Compiled and published by the Official Charts Company, the data is based on each track's weekly physical sales, digital downloads and streams. In 2000, there were 20 singles that topped the 53 published charts. The first number-one single of the year was "She's Got Issues" by American pop punk band The Offspring, which spent the last week of 1999 and the first week of 2000 at number one. The final number-one single of the year was "Thank You for Loving Me" by Bon Jovi, which spent three weeks in December at number one.

The most successful song on the UK Rock & Metal Singles Chart in 2000 was "Take a Look Around" by American nu metal band Limp Bizkit, which spent ten weeks at number one. The band also topped the chart for one week with "My Generation". Blink-182 spent nine weeks at number one with "All the Small Things" and one week with "What's My Age Again?" Korn spent six weeks at number one, with "Falling Away from Me" and "Make Me Bad" each topping the chart for three weeks, while Green Day spent five weeks at number one with "Minority" (four weeks) and "Warning" (one week). Creed's "Higher" was number one for four weeks; Coldplay's "Trouble" and Bon Jovi's "Thank You for Loving Me" were both number one for three weeks; and Slipknot's "Wait and Bleed" and Iron Maiden's "The Wicker Man" were number one for two weeks.

== Chart history ==
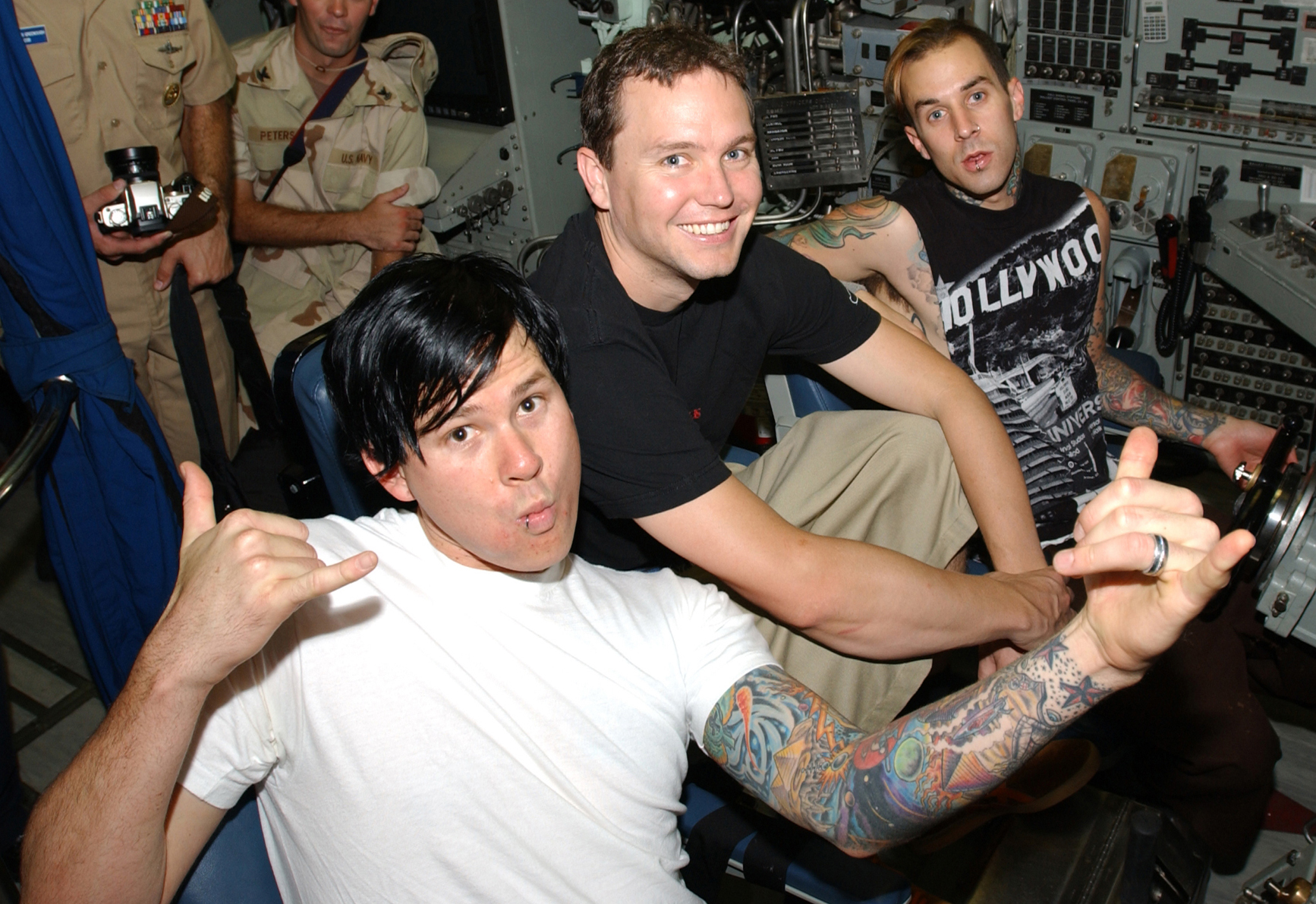
Blink-182 spent nine weeks at number one with "All the Small Things" and one week with "What's My Age Again?"

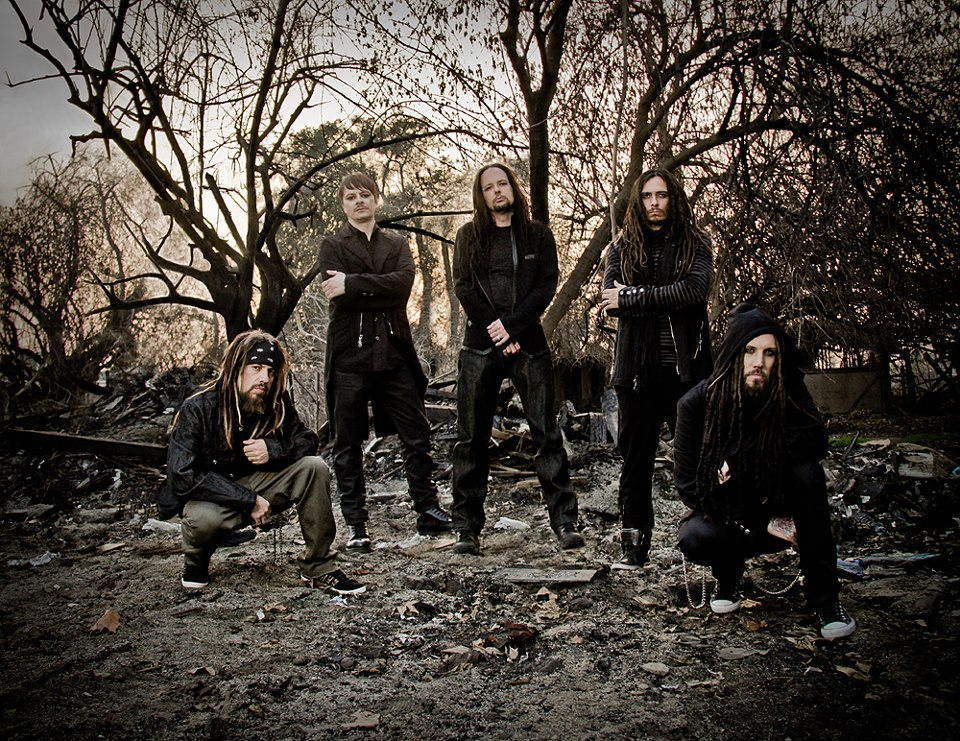
Korn topped the chart with two singles in 2000 – "Falling Away from Me" and "Make Me Bad" – each for three weeks.

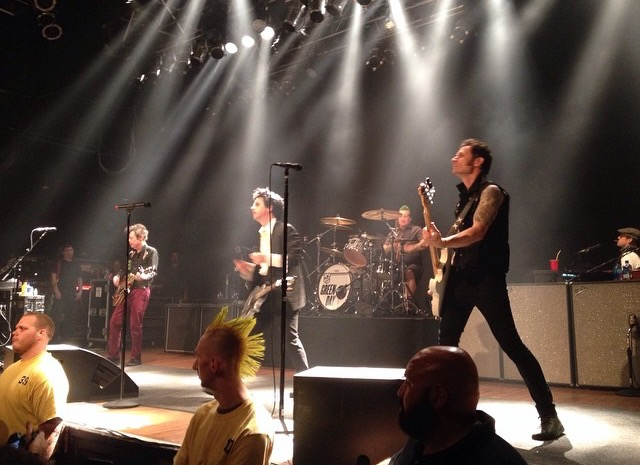
Green Day spent four weeks at number one in 2000 with "Minority" and one week with "Warning".

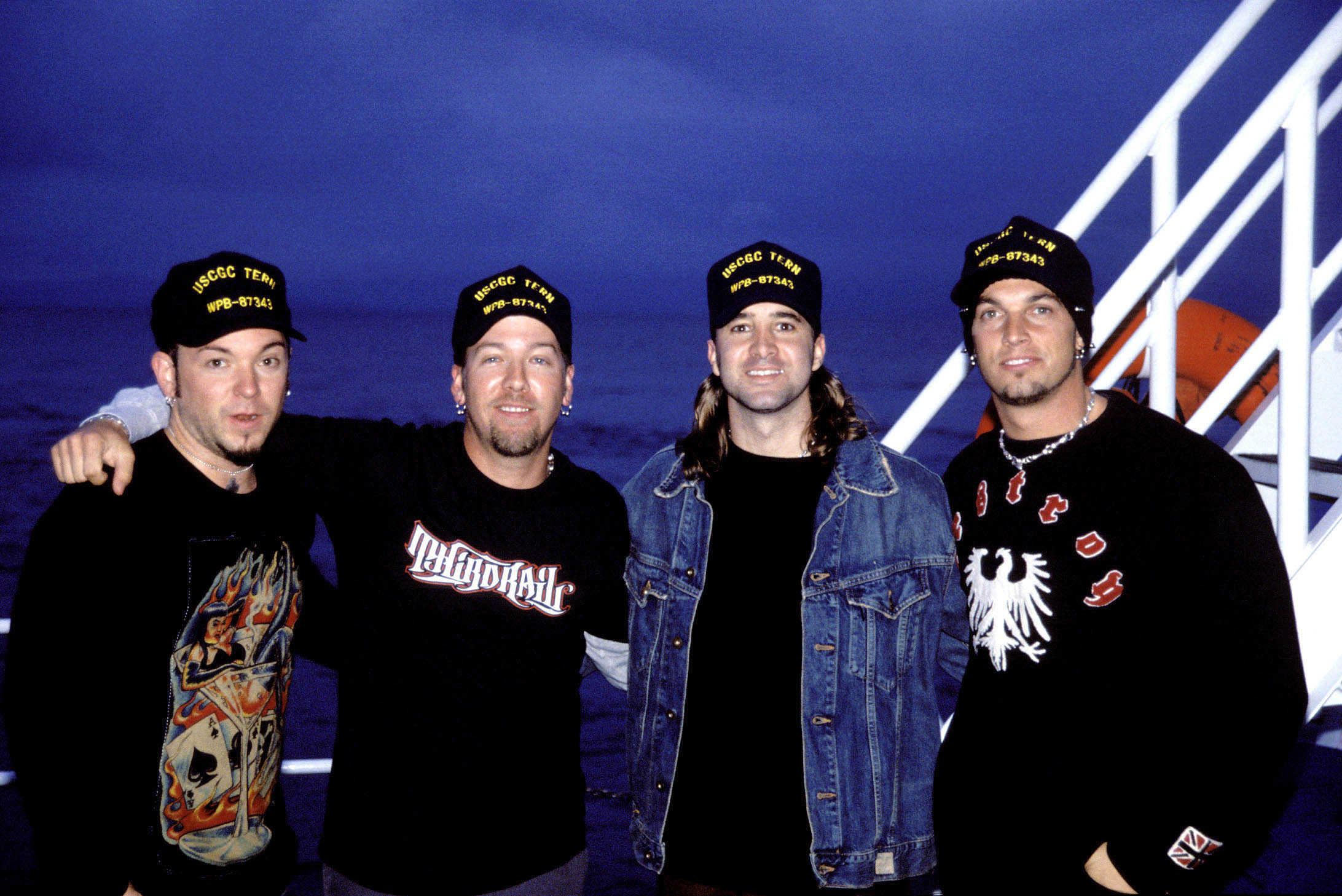
Creed's "Higher" was number one for four weeks in January 2000.

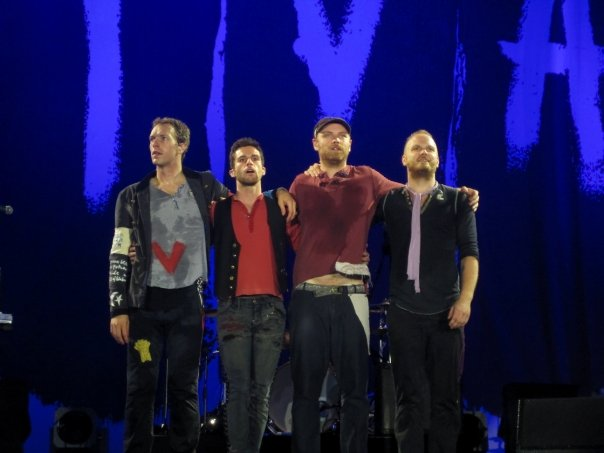
Coldplay spent three weeks at number one in 2000 with "Trouble".

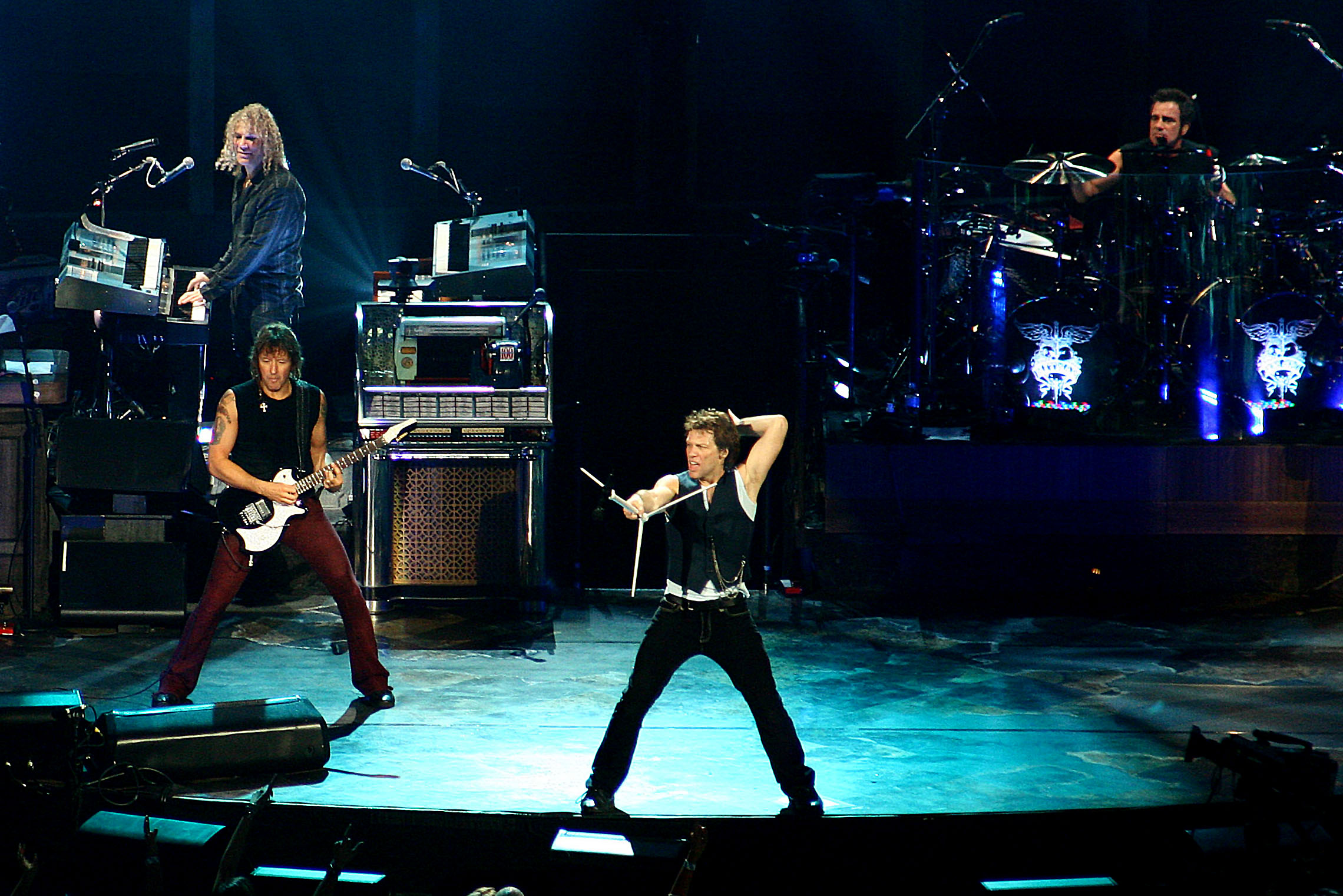
Bon Jovi's "Thank You for Loving Me" was number one for two weeks.

| Issue date | Single | Artist(s) | Record label(s) | Ref. |
|---|---|---|---|---|
| 1 January | "She's Got Issues" | The Offspring | Columbia | |
| 8 January | "Higher" | Creed | Epic | |
| 15 January | "Higher" | Creed | Epic | |
| 22 January | "Higher" | Creed | Epic | |
| 29 January | "Higher" | Creed | Epic | |
| 5 February | "The Dolphin's Cry" | Live | Radioactive | |
| 12 February | "Falling Away from Me" | Korn | Epic | |
| 19 February | "Falling Away from Me" | Korn | Epic | |
| 26 February | "Falling Away from Me" | Korn | Epic | |
| 4 March | "Stand Inside Your Love" | The Smashing Pumpkins | Hut | |
| 11 March | "Wait and Bleed" | Slipknot | Roadrunner | |
| 18 March | "Wait and Bleed" | Slipknot | Roadrunner | |
| 25 March | "All the Small Things" | Blink-182 | MCA | |
| 1 April | "All the Small Things" | Blink-182 | MCA | |
| 8 April | "All the Small Things" | Blink-182 | MCA | |
| 15 April | "All the Small Things" | Blink-182 | MCA | |
| 22 April | "All the Small Things" | Blink-182 | MCA | |
| 29 April | "All the Small Things" | Blink-182 | MCA | |
| 6 May | "All the Small Things" | Blink-182 | MCA | |
| 13 May | "Nothing as It Seems" | Pearl Jam | Epic | |
| 20 May | "The Wicker Man" | Iron Maiden | EMI | |
| 27 May | "The Wicker Man" | Iron Maiden | EMI | |
| 3 June | "Make Me Bad" | Korn | Epic | |
| 10 June | "Make Me Bad" | Korn | Epic | |
| 17 June | "Make Me Bad" | Korn | Epic | |
| 24 June | "All the Small Things" | Blink-182 | MCA | |
| 1 July | "All the Small Things" | Blink-182 | MCA | |
| 8 July | "What's My Age Again?" | Blink-182 | MCA | |
| 15 July | "Take a Look Around" | Limp Bizkit | Interscope | |
| 22 July | "Take a Look Around" | Limp Bizkit | Interscope | |
| 29 July | "Take a Look Around" | Limp Bizkit | Interscope | |
| 5 August | "Take a Look Around" | Limp Bizkit | Interscope | |
| 12 August | "Take a Look Around" | Limp Bizkit | Interscope | |
| 19 August | "Take a Look Around" | Limp Bizkit | Interscope | |
| 26 August | "Take a Look Around" | Limp Bizkit | Interscope | |
| 2 September | "Take a Look Around" | Limp Bizkit | Interscope | |
| 9 September | "Take a Look Around" | Limp Bizkit | Interscope | |
| 16 September | "Spit It Out" | Slipknot | Roadrunner | |
| 23 September | "Take a Look Around" | Limp Bizkit | Interscope | |
| 30 September | "Minority" | Green Day | Reprise | |
| 7 October | "Minority" | Green Day | Reprise | |
| 14 October | "Minority" | Green Day | Reprise | |
| 21 October | "Dead Battery" | Pitchshifter | MCA | |
| 28 October | "Minority" | Green Day | Reprise | |
| 4 November | "Trouble" | Coldplay | Parlophone | |
| 11 November | "My Generation" | Limp Bizkit | Interscope | |
| 18 November | "Disposable Teens" | Marilyn Manson | Nothing | |
| 25 November | "Trouble" | Coldplay | Parlophone | |
| 2 December | "Trouble" | Coldplay | Parlophone | |
| 9 December | "Thank You for Loving Me" | Bon Jovi | Mercury | |
| 16 December | "Thank You for Loving Me" | Bon Jovi | Mercury | |
| 23 December | "Warning" | Green Day | Reprise | |
| 30 December | "Thank You for Loving Me" | Bon Jovi | Mercury | |

== See also ==
- 2000 in British music
- List of UK Rock & Metal Albums Chart number ones of 2000
