= List of Nintendocore bands =

This is a list of bands that play Nintendocore, a style of music that combines chiptune and video game music with various forms of heavy metal and hardcore punk.

== A ==
- The Advantage
- An Albatross
- Anamanaguchi

== D ==
- The Depreciation Guild

== F ==
- Fear, and Loathing in Las Vegas

== G ==
- Genghis Tron

== H ==
- Horse the Band

== I ==
- I See Stars
- I Fight Dragons

== K ==
- Karate High School

== M ==
- Math the Band
- The Megas
- Minibosses

== O ==
- The Octopus Project

== P ==
- The Protomen
- Powerglove

== R ==
- Rolo Tomassi

== S ==
- Sky Eats Airplane

== See also ==
- List of chiptune artists
- List of electronicore bands
