= Somebody Someone =

Promotional single by Korn

from the album Issues
- Released: July 3, 2000
- Genre: Nu metal
- Length: 3:47
- Label: Epic
- Songwriter: Korn
- Producer: Brendan O'Brien

Korn singles chronology
"Make Me Bad" (2000)	"Somebody Someone" (2000)	"Here to Stay" (2002)

Music video
- "Somebody Someone" on YouTube

"Somebody Someone" is a promotional single by American nu metal band Korn from their fourth studio album, Issues (1999). It was the least successful single from the album, and failed to reach the top 20 of Billboard's Mainstream Rock and Modern Rock Tracks charts, although it gained moderate airplay on MTV's Total Request Live.

The song is well known for its live performance and was a concert staple from 2000 to 2011. It was absent from The Path of Totality Tour setlist, a first since its release. However, the end section of the song was played directly the performance of "Shoots and Ladders" at live performances starting in 2013.

== Music video ==
The music video, directed by Martin Weisz, is performance-based and filled with CGI effects, with a look similar to its predecessor, "Make Me Bad" (also directed by Weisz).

== Charts ==
=== Weekly charts ===
Chart (2000)	Peak position
El Salvador (Notimex)	4

== Remixes ==
Version	Release appearance
LukHash Remix (2005)	LukHash official website
