= She (Swedish band) =

Swedish electronica band

she

Background information
- Also known as: Imagery By Sound, 4ikai, D7VON, Spillexo
- Origin: Varberg, Sweden
- Genres: Electronica, Chiptune, Ambient, Synthwave, Vaporwave
- Years active: 2003-2013 (hiatus); 2015-present
- Label: Pony Canyon 8bitpeoples
- Members: Lain Volta Trzaska
- Website: www.shemusic.org lainvoltastudios.com www.facebook.com/shemusic.org www.facebook.com/imagerybysound www.facebook.com/4ikai www.facebook.com/D7VON twitter.com/shemusic twitter.com/imagerybysound twitter.com/4ikai twitter.com/D7VON sheofficial.bandcamp.com 4ikai.bandcamp.com imagerybysound.bandcamp.com soundcloud.com/shemusic

she is a musical project formed in 2003 by the Polish artist, producer and musician Lain Volta Trzaska, and is sometimes credited as shemusic, Lain Volta. As its main producer, songwriter, and instrumentalist, Lain is the only official member, but he brings in vocalists to perform.

Lain is known to have multiple different musical projects, including those such as Imagery by Sound, D7VON, 4ikai, and Spillexo.

== History ==
Lain Volta Trzaska was born on 20 June 1983, in Kraków, Poland. He moved to Sweden at the age of 5, where he learned to play the piano and violin at an early age. Despite his early introduction to the world of music, he hadn't garnered an interest for it until much later. His passions at a young age were centered around drawing and writing comics.

=== Pre-shemusic (1997–2003) ===
In 1997, Lain began creating music using FastTracker for computer games he had created. It was around this time that young Trzaska and his friends held competitions to see who could create the "coolest" sounding song. This was what would wind up driving him further in the direction of a musical career. The combinations of his passions in art and music were what would later result in the creation of "she."

=== Formation and early works (2003–2008) ===
In 2003, Lain launched his project "she," deviating from his game music sound into more band-oriented music, starting with his first official release Emit and Exude in 2004. As well as having a written narrative behind the music, Emit and Exude explored a more ambient and industrial sound while still retaining some elements from his game music including chiptune and game sound elements. Trzaska explained that the goal was to establish his sound and create the feeling of something "coming into existence." The protagonist of the story remains the only one created from the music in the album as opposed to the other way around, where "Reborn" represents her creation, "Trains" represents an uncertain destination, and the rest of the story is the listener's creation.

March 2005 saw the second official release from she, Digital Ambient Designs, which, as implied by the name, was an album released in an electronic ambient style. The narrative established in Emit and Exude was continued, but it's unclear from an objective standpoint what direction the story takes. As with most of Trzaska's releases, it is up to the listener to continue the story.

In June 2007, the heavily story-based album days was released by she, and was made available for free. Shortly afterward a prequel continuation to days, Nights, was announced to be in production. Traveling by Night was also released in August.

=== Growth in Popularity and Major Label Releases (2008–2011) ===
In June 2008, shortly after releasing Coloris, Trzaska was contacted by Japanese music label Pony Canyon for a record deal. Pony Canyon released the Coloris album in physical and digital formats throughout the Asian market but Lain retained his worldwide copyright, excluding Japan. Further production of Nights was also in the works, but fell out of development after struggles with hardware and software, leading to a brief hiatus and rewrite of all the songs in the album. 2008 also saw the release of the Chiptek EP and she's single, 2008.

In 2009, Trzaska continued through working through producing Nights as well as a second major album under the Pony Canyon label. Despite his earlier confidence in taking on both projects at the same time, he eventually began feeling the stress of the workload, and put Nights on indefinite hiatus on 3 March. This allowed him to focus heavily on pushing out the album for Pony Canyon, which allowed for the release of the second major she album under Pony Canyon, Orion. This is considered to be the direct sequel to Coloris in regards to the story behind the music. After the release of Orion, Trzaska made a statement that Nights was to be put back into production.

=== Hiatus and Imagery By Sound (2011–2012) ===
In early 2011, after more than a years hiatus, Lain released the Single 'Make Me Real' which was a more slow and ambient vocal piece, similar to his more earlier work from 2004.

In May 2012, Trzaska announced that "she" has been put on indefinite hiatus. He later clarified that only the band has been put on hiatus, not himself as an artist. A few days later, Lain announced that "shemusic" (that is, his style of music blend [mainly Electro House/Chiptune and Ambient Acoustic] released under his band "she") was going to split in two. He further announced the new band was to be known as "Imagery by Sound". "she" and "Imagery by Sound" are now the two sides of "shemusic". While "she" follows its way on Electro House and Chiptune, "Imagery by Sound" focuses now on the "ambient/acoustic and electro experimental aspect of "shemusic". Imagery by Sound features the previous albums (Insomnia, days, Digital Ambient Designs) from "she" as a related musical legacy. The upcoming Nights album will be released under Imagery by Sound.

In December 2012, Insomnia became the first EP released under Imagery by Sound, with the single "Darkness of my Past" coming in late August. Both were briefly released for free that October.

=== Return from hiatus, Electric Girl and 4ikai (2012–2015) ===
In September of 2005, Trzaska released the first album after the hiatus titled Electric Girl, which had been put on the shelf in 2010.

In March 2013, his newest side project "4ikai" was announced, set to explore the more ambient, glitch style of Trzaska's music without relation to she or Imagery by Sound's continuity. Although the name had been established, it wouldn't see an official musical release in 2013.

=== Chiptune Memories, Chroma and EP's (2015–2019) ===
In November 2014, Trzaska announced a new she album to be released during spring 2015, with a single from the album to be released a few weeks before it. This release was pushed back to December 2015, when she's next album, Chiptune Memories, was released. This album and its lyricism reflect heavily on dated concepts and technology, featuring instrumentation generated from Game Boy, Sega Genesis FM Chips, and Nintendo Entertainment Systems.

In January 2015, almost two years after Trzaska's announcement of his side project "4ikai," the EP Hyperborea had been released, officially establishing a sound to the 4ikai name. The following March, two new singles ("Thaw" and "Winter Dynamics") were also released under 4ikai.

In October 2016, Trzaska released a new she EP named Abyss. One month later, Trzaska announced a continuation of the story developed in Coloris and Orion would be coming out in the form of a third album.

In February 2017, 4ikai saw the release of the 5-track EP Analogica. Trzaska followed up with another musical release that December under she, titled Chroma, which took a different musical direction than previous releases, incorporating elements found in 80's electronic music. However, this was not the aforementioned continuation of Coloris and Orion.

In February 2018, Trzaska produced the intro theme for American Twitch streamer Dr DisRespect, appropriately titled The Doctors Intro Theme. In accordance with a precedence set by both Chroma and Dr DisRespect's overall aesthetic, this release also saw a strong 80's influence.

=== Aspire, Harvest and Spectral touch (2019–present) ===
The last full length album Aspire was released 8 November 2019, followed by a chiptune EP Harvest in August 2020. In 2024, the EP Spectral Touch was released with 3D animations as promotions.

== Musical style ==
While she's music can be labeled as electronica and chiptune, it incorporates elements from ambient and classical music. Using a mixture of old 8-bit computers and modern equipment, she's music is produced in the bitpop style.

While she's albums are electronic in nature, they can vary in genres from album to album. For example, she's first release, Emit and Exude, is a blend of industrial-electro with electric guitars; the third release, Pioneer, is a chiptune album that uses a Game Boy as the main instrument, and the first major release, Coloris, is a dance-electronica album.

Lain often uses acoustic instruments with synthesizers (this stems from his musical roots in classical piano).

An effect Lain often uses is "synthetic distortion", i.e. making the music sound 'glitchy' or 'laggy' like a damaged mp3 or CD. This creates an impression of the music being damaged.

Lain often uses Renoise, a DAW based upon the heritage and development of tracker software, to create his music. He often masters his music using Sound Forge.

== Visuals and design ==
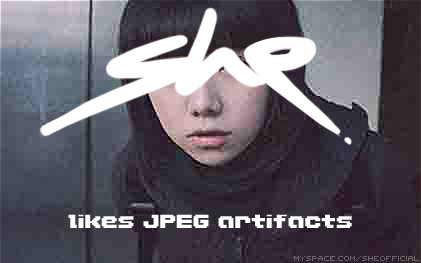
Myspace-era (2005–2008) promotional art for shemusic.

The graphics, illustrations and designs surrounding she's releases are directly connected with each album and both the images and music are intended to tell a story. For example, the days album was created as a short story where each song introduces a new chapter. Lain describes that while the sounds, effects, and lyrics give clues to the story of the album, "the listener would find himself creating images and events in his head, completing the story".

A recurring theme in she's art is that some images seem to be damaged or poorly compressed in certain parts. Just like with the music distortion, the images are designed to give the impression that the file is incomplete, broken and not correctly displayed.

Lain uses symbolism in his images, often tying the imagery into story elements.

== Discography ==
Most of She's releases are available for download on the official she Bandcamp.

The Electric Girl album was originally planned for a release in 2010, but was later postponed until November 2012.

Music from the album days is used as music in the movie 12 Fl oz.

she occasionally releases compilations of free songs called "she music collections" that disappear soon after their release. These collections contain old music, demos, pieces of released albums, alternate versions of songs, and more.

=== Major releases ===
- Coloris - 17 June 2008
- Orion - 16 September 2009
- Electric Girl - 29 November 2012 (10 November 2010 was intended release date)
- Chiptune Memories - 3 December 2015
- Aspire - 8 November 2019

=== EPs and compilations ===
- Emit and Exude - 4 May 2004
- digital ambient designs - 16 March 2005
- Pioneer - 20 December 2006
- days - 17 June 2007
- Chiptek - 1 November 2008
- Journeys - 10 May 2011
- Insomnia by Imagery by Sound - 6 December 2012
- Come See Me - 21 September 2014
- Come a Little Closer - 18 March 2015
- Abyss - 14 October 2016
- Chroma - 8 December 2017
- Drift - 6 November 2018
- Armacadia - 1 December 2019
- Harvest - 28 August 2020
- Spectral Touch - 27 June 2024

=== Singles ===
- And Beyond - 5 July 2005
- Songbird - 10 February 2007
- 2008/Chiptune Superstar - 20 December 2008
- Make Me Real - 25 March 2011
- Always Yours - 13 December 2012
- Distortia - 13 January 2013
- Since You Left - 3 March 2013
- Break The Silence - 28 March 2013
- Come See Me - 25 June 2013
- Archetype - 19 July 2013
- Easy Action - 13 September 2013
- Axiom - 28 April 2015
- Champagne Nights - 1 February 2017
- Ready for You - 2 June 2023
- You Rock Me - 29 June 2023
- Next to Me - 4 August 2023
- Vector Break - 1 March 2024
