= Jingle Balls =

Promotional single by Korn

from the album All Mixed Up
- Released: 1999
- Recorded: 1998
- Genre: Christmas; death metal
- Length: 3:27
- Label: Immortal; Epic
- Songwriters: Reginald Arvizu; Jonathan Davis; James Shaffer; David Silveria; Brian Welch
- Producers: Steve Thompson; Toby Wright; Korn

Korn singles chronology
"Falling Away from Me" (1999)	"Jingle Balls" (1999)	"Make Me Bad" (2000)

"Jingle Balls" is a song recorded by the American nu metal band Korn during sessions of their third studio album, Follow the Leader. It was released in Australia as an exclusive sampler, along with the track "Wake Up", in 1999.

== Music and structure ==
"Jingle Balls" is a death metal rendition of the famous Christmas song "Jingle Bells", featured on a bonus EP included with Issues. It has been widely circulated as the "Jingle Bells death metal version" on the Internet. A slightly different and shorter version with bagpipes was played live on Los Angeles KROQ's Almost Acoustic Christmas concert on December 11, 1998.

== Reception ==
In his review for All Mixed Up, Jason Birchmeier of AllMusic called the song "a one-time novelty, not one with lasting appeal".

== Track listing ==
- CD SAMP 2164
1. "Jingle Balls" – 3:27
2. "Wake Up" – 4:07
