= List of UK Rock & Metal Albums Chart number ones of 2000 =

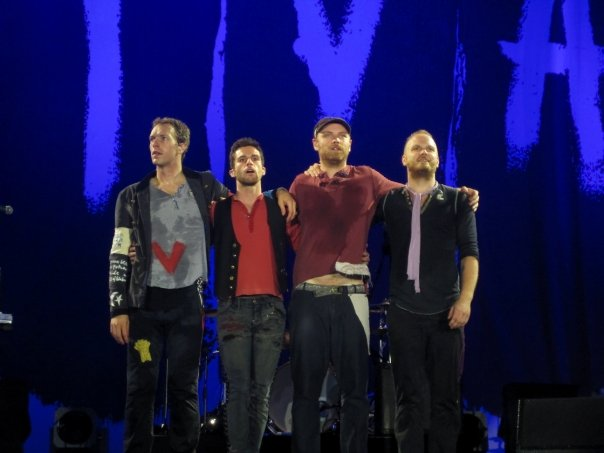
Coldplay's debut album Parachutes was the longest-running UK Rock & Metal Albums Chart number-one album of 2000, spending 21 weeks atop the chart.

The UK Rock & Metal Albums Chart is a record chart which ranks the best-selling rock and heavy metal albums in the United Kingdom. Compiled and published by the Official Charts Company, the data is based on each album's weekly physical sales, digital downloads and streams. In 2000, there were 18 albums that topped the 52 published charts. The first number-one album of the year was the Guns N' Roses live album Live Era '87–'93, which was released the previous year and topped the chart on 11 December 1999. The album remained at the top of the chart for four weeks, including the first of 2000. The final number-one album of the year was Coldplay's debut studio album Parachutes, which spent the last nine weeks of the year (and the first two weeks of 2001) at number one.

The most successful album on the UK Rock & Metal Albums Chart in 2000 was Parachutes, which spent a total of 21 weeks at number one over three spells, including a run of eleven consecutive weeks and another of nine (eleven including the first two weeks of 2001). Parachutes was the best-selling rock and metal album of the year, ranking 8th in the UK End of Year Albums Chart. As of July 2016, it is the 45th best-selling album in the UK of all-time. Standing on the Shoulder of Giants, the fourth studio album by Oasis, spent nine weeks at number one in 2000; Iron Maiden's Brave New World and Blink-182's Enema of the State were each number one for three weeks; and Dookie by Green Day, Blood Sugar Sex Magik by Red Hot Chili Peppers and Binaural by Pearl Jam spent two weeks at number one.

== Chart history ==
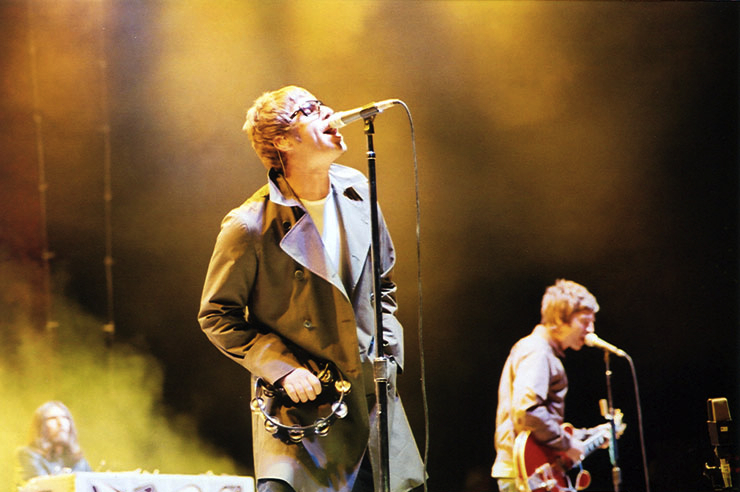
Standing on the Shoulder of Giants by Oasis spent nine weeks at number one in 2000, and was the 26th best-selling album of the year in the UK.

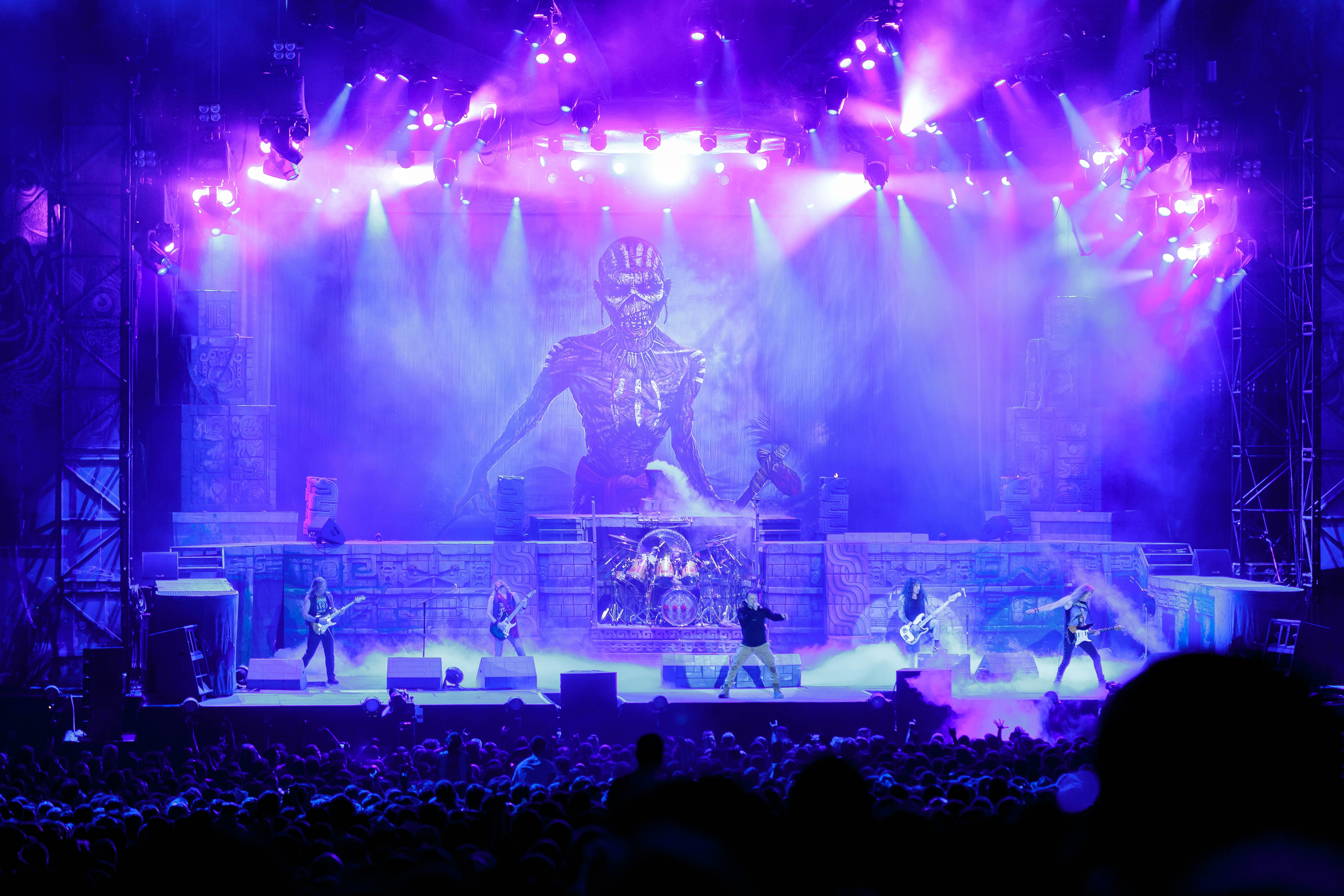
Iron Maiden's twelfth studio album Brave New World was number one for three weeks in June 2000.

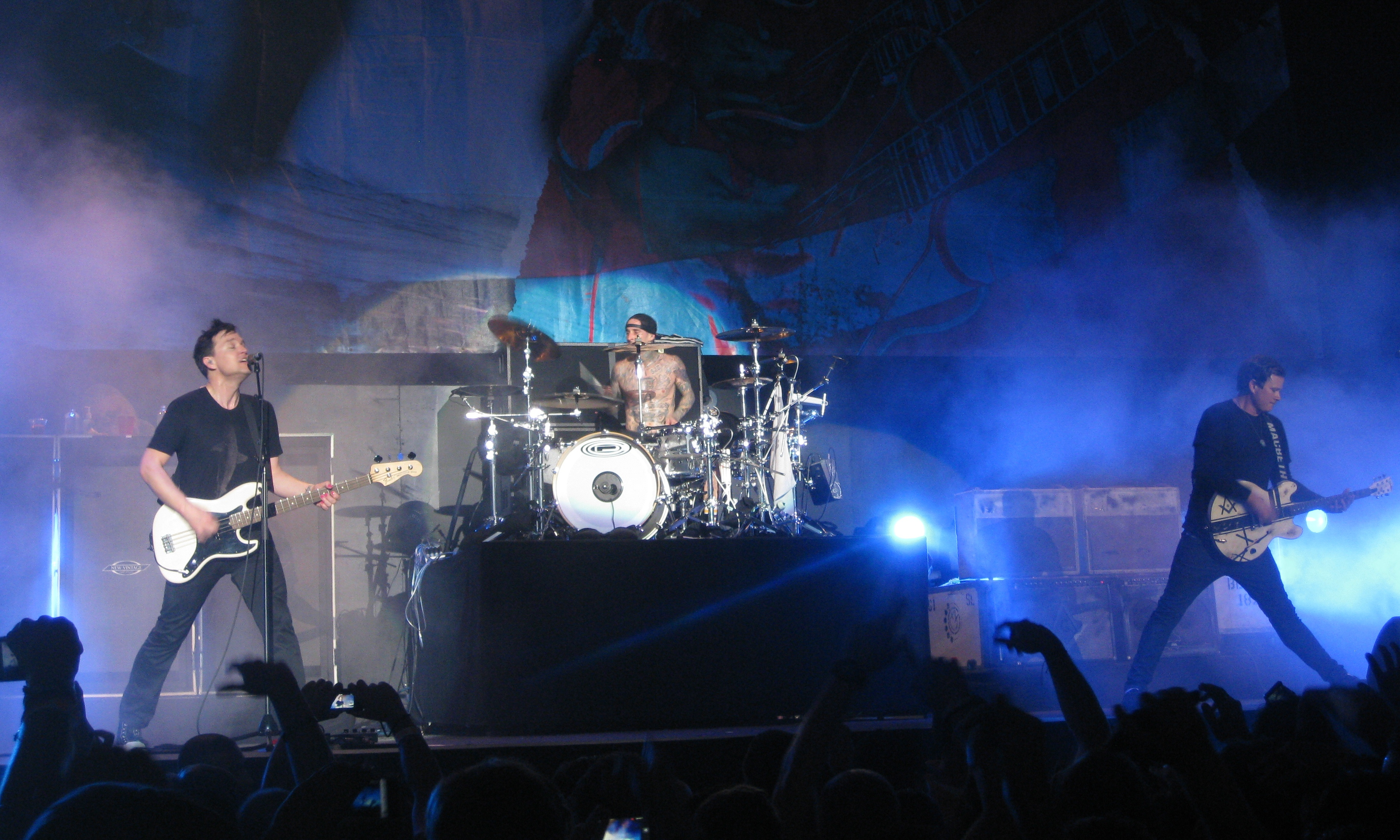
Blink-182 spent three weeks at number one on the UK Rock & Metal Albums Chart in 2000 with Enema of the State.

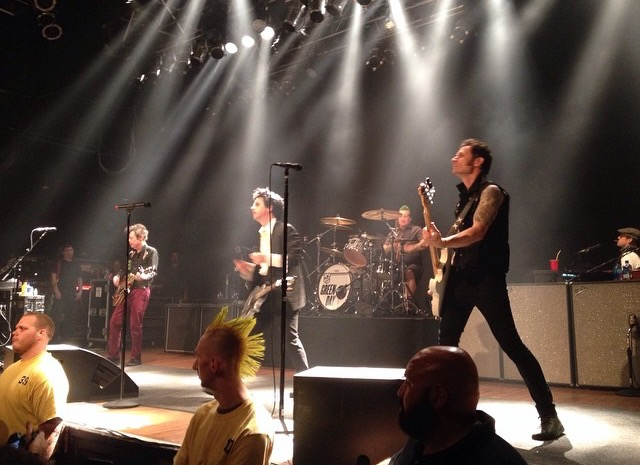
Green Day were number one in 2000 with two different releases: Dookie (two weeks) and Warning (one week).

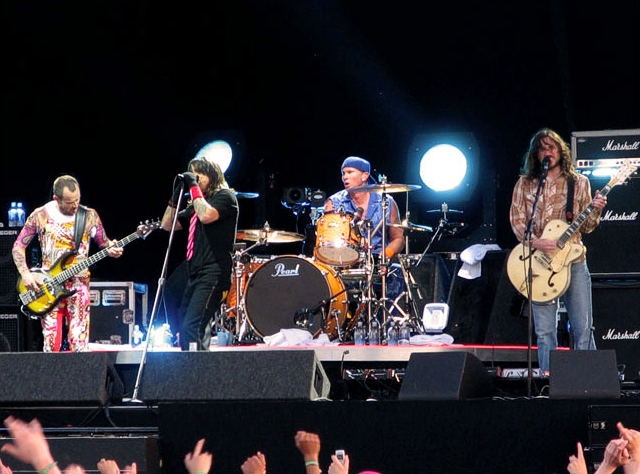
Blood Sugar Sex Magik by Red Hot Chili Peppers was number one on the chart for two weeks in 2000.

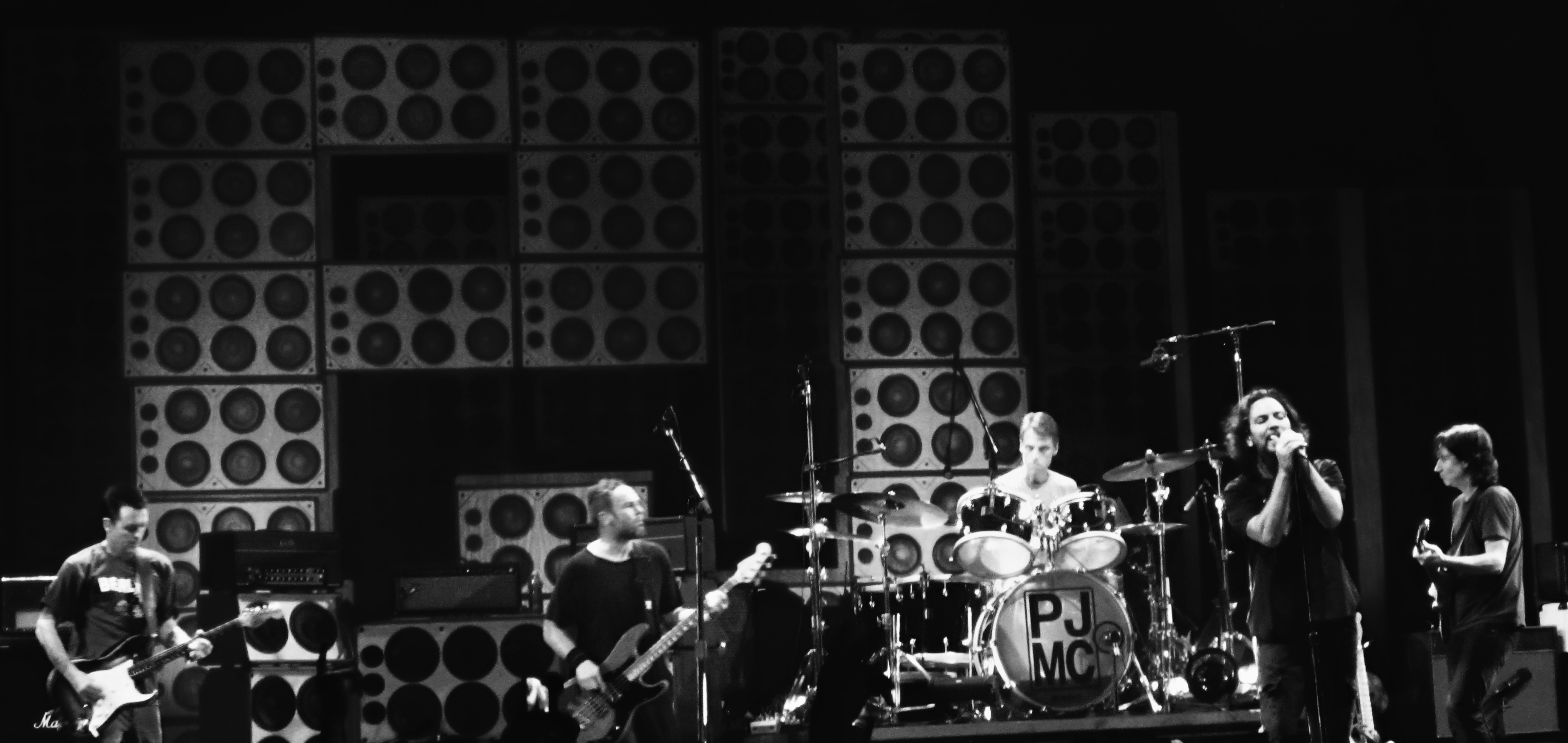
Pearl Jam's sixth studio album Binaural spent two weeks at number one.

Key
†	Indicates best-selling rock album of 2000

Issue date	Album	Artist(s)	Record label(s)	Ref.
1 January	Live Era '87–'93	Guns N' Roses	Geffen Records	
8 January	Dookie	Green Day	Reprise	
15 January	Dookie	Green Day	Reprise	
22 January	Nevermind	Nirvana	Geffen	
29 January	Americana	The Offspring	Columbia	
5 February	In Concert with The London Symphony Orchestra	Deep Purple	Eagle	
12 February	Blood Sugar Sex Magik	Red Hot Chili Peppers	Warner Bros.	
19 February	Blood Sugar Sex Magik	Red Hot Chili Peppers	Warner Bros.	
26 February	Garbage	Garbage	Mushroom	
4 March	Appetite for Destruction	Guns N' Roses	Geffen	
11 March	Standing on the Shoulder of Giants	Oasis	Big Brother	
18 March	Standing on the Shoulder of Giants	Oasis	Big Brother	
25 March	Standing on the Shoulder of Giants	Oasis	Big Brother	
1 April	Standing on the Shoulder of Giants	Oasis	Big Brother	
8 April	Reinventing the Steel	Pantera	Elektra	
15 April	Standing on the Shoulder of Giants	Oasis	Big Brother	
22 April	Standing on the Shoulder of Giants	Oasis	Big Brother	
29 April	Standing on the Shoulder of Giants	Oasis	Big Brother	
6 May	Standing on the Shoulder of Giants	Oasis	Big Brother	
13 May	Standing on the Shoulder of Giants	Oasis	Big Brother	
20 May	Enema of the State	Blink-182	MCA	
27 May	Binaural	Pearl Jam	Epic	
3 June	Binaural	Pearl Jam	Epic	
10 June	Brave New World	Iron Maiden	EMI	
17 June	Brave New World	Iron Maiden	EMI	
24 June	Brave New World	Iron Maiden	EMI	
1 July	Mission: Impossible 2 Original Soundtrack	Various artists	Hollywood	
8 July	Enema of the State	Blink-182	MCA	
15 July	Enema of the State	Blink-182	MCA	
22 July	Parachutes †	Coldplay	Parlophone	
29 July	Parachutes †	Coldplay	Parlophone	
5 August	Parachutes †	Coldplay	Parlophone	
12 August	Parachutes †	Coldplay	Parlophone	
19 August	Parachutes †	Coldplay	Parlophone	
26 August	Parachutes †	Coldplay	Parlophone	
2 September	Parachutes †	Coldplay	Parlophone	
9 September	Parachutes †	Coldplay	Parlophone	
16 September	Parachutes †	Coldplay	Parlophone	
23 September	Parachutes †	Coldplay	Parlophone	
30 September	Parachutes †	Coldplay	Parlophone	
7 October	Never Mind the Bollocks, Here's the Sex Pistols	Sex Pistols	Virgin	
14 October	Warning	Green Day	Reprise	
21 October	Parachutes †	Coldplay	Parlophone	
28 October	Chocolate Starfish and the Hot Dog Flavored Water	Limp Bizkit	Interscope	
4 November	Parachutes †	Coldplay	Parlophone	
11 November	Parachutes †	Coldplay	Parlophone	
18 November	Parachutes †	Coldplay	Parlophone	
25 November	Parachutes †	Coldplay	Parlophone	
2 December	Parachutes †	Coldplay	Parlophone	
9 December	Parachutes †	Coldplay	Parlophone	
16 December	Parachutes †	Coldplay	Parlophone	
23 December	Parachutes †	Coldplay	Parlophone	
30 December	Parachutes †	Coldplay	Parlophone	

== See also ==
- 2000 in British music
- List of UK Rock & Metal Singles Chart number ones of 2000
