= Issues (Korn album) =

1999 studio album by Korn

Studio album by Korn
- Released: November 16, 1999
- Recorded: July–September 1999
- Studios: A&M (Hollywood, California); Southern Tracks (Atlanta, Georgia)
- Genres: Nu metal; alternative metal
- Length: 53:16
- Labels: Immortal; Epic
- Producer: Brendan O'Brien

Korn chronology
Follow the Leader (1998)	Issues (1999)	All Mixed Up (2001)

Singles from Issues
- 1. "Falling Away from Me" Released: December 6, 1999; 2. "Make Me Bad" Released: February 1, 2000

2nd-place cover design

3rd-place cover design

4th-place cover design

Issues is the fourth studio album by American nu metal band Korn. It was released on November 16, 1999, through both Immortal and Epic Records. The album was promoted throughout 2000 by the band's highly successful Sick and Twisted Tour.

== Recording and production ==
During one of the band's recording sessions, journalist Chris Connelly asked about how the recording was coming along, to which drummer David Silveria responded that it "Sounds like the music is a little more simplified and heavier. Kind of heavier grooves, more than the last couple. So kind of more similar to the beginning, except Jon is a much better singer now, so it's all coming together."

In October 1999, Korn posted "Falling Away from Me" on their website as a free MP3 download, although it was against the advice of its attorneys. A statement on the band's site relates: "We're so psyched about [the new album] that we wanted to give all you guys, the true Korn fans—a gift from us." Also at this time, the band attempted to start an online chain email, by posting the letter online and asking fans to email the letter to 10 other people and to then sign the "I Downloaded the Korn Single for Free" guestbook on the band's site. For each person who signed, Korn donated 25 cents to the charities Childhelp USA and Children of the Night. It raised over $250,000.

The album featured four different covers each designed by Korn fans as part of an MTV contest (the winning cover, submitted in a pizza box, was designed by Alfredo Carlos; another album cover for special limited edition of the album features a cartoonish half-caricature for the band). There was also a fifth cover selected for the limited tour edition of the album.

== Release and commercial performance ==
Issues went to number 1 on the Billboard 200 selling 575,000 copies, preventing both Dr. Dre's 2001 (which sold 516,000) and Celine Dion's All the Way... A Decade of Song from going to number 1. To celebrate the release of Issues, Korn performed the entire album in its running order at Harlem's famed Apollo Theater. On December 22, 1999, a month after the album's release date, Issues was certified 3× platinum by the Recording Industry Association of America (RIAA). As of 2003 According to Nielsen Soundscan, Issues sold at least 3,200,000 copies in the United States. On Billboard's year-end chart for the year 2000, Issues was at number 19. As of 2023 Issues has sold an estimated 13 million copies worldwide.

Three songs from Issues were released as singles: "Falling Away from Me", "Make Me Bad", and "Somebody Someone". On December 25, 1999, "Falling Away from Me" went to number 8 on the Bubbling Under Hot 100 Singles chart. "Falling Away from Me" was on that chart for sixteen weeks. "Falling Away from Me" also went to number 7 on the Mainstream Rock Songs chart and number 7 on the Modern Rock Tracks chart. On April 22, 2000, "Make Me Bad" went to number 14 on the Bubbling Under Hot 100 Singles chart. "Make Me Bad" was on that chart for 12 weeks. "Make Me Bad" also went to number 9 on the Mainstream Rock Songs chart and number 7 on the Modern Rock Tracks chart. "Falling Away from Me" went to number 1 on MTV's Total Request Live many times during both November and December 1999.

== Promotion and touring ==
In October 1999, Korn appeared as themselves in the South Park episode "Korn's Groovy Pirate Ghost Mystery", with "Falling Away From Me" being played at the end of the episode. The episode was a parody of Hanna-Barbera cartoons, and depicted the band as having a chicken-like creature named Nibblet, which was a parody of Scooby-Doo. The promotional touring cycle began with a performance on November 15, 1999, at the historic Apollo Theater in Harlem, New York.. This concert saw Korn become one of the first major rock acts to play the venue, which was traditionally used by black soul and R&B musicians.

Following the album's release, the band embarked on the Sick and Twisted Tour throughout 2000. The tour included support from rising acts such as Staind, P.O.D., and Mindless Self Indulgence. While the tour was happening in March 2000, drummer David Silveria suffered a wrist injury. This led to Mike Bordin stepping in to finish the touring cycle, playing nearly 100 shows with Korn over a five month period, including shows at that year's Summer Sanitarium Tour. Bordin's band Faith No More had broken up in April 1998, and the members of Korn have mentioned Faith No More as being a major influence on them since the late 1980s, with James 'Munky' Shaffer remembering in 2015, "It was a lot of fun to jam with him – he’s punk rock at heart and just a great drummer. So for a while there you had Korn with this Faith No More groove – it was crazy". Korn were followed on their Sick and Twisted Tour by the MTV show Diary, with this episode being filmed in February 2000, and airing the following month. The episode also featured cameos from Brian 'Head' Welch's then-wife Rebekah Landis and their daughter Jennea, who they had in 1998. Welch and Landis divorced the following year, with Welch taking custody of the child due to Landis's meth addiction.

== Critical reception ==
Professional ratings
Review scores
Source	Rating
AllMusic	4.5/5 stars
The Encyclopedia of Popular Music	4/5 stars
Entertainment Weekly	C
NME	6/10
PopMatters	3/10
Rolling Stone	3/5 stars
The Rolling Stone Album Guide	2.5/5 stars
Select	2/5 stars
Spin	5/10
The Village Voice	(dud)

The album received mixed reviews. According to the band in the booklet that comes with Greatest Hits, Vol. 1 album, they did not want to be part of a popular trend and wanted to do their own thing. The band admits that with Brendan O'Brien working alongside them, they were more focused during recording because he didn't let them just fool around and party, so there was a lot less drinking this time around.

In 2021, it was named one of the 20 best metal albums of 1999 by Metal Hammer magazine. In 2025, Loudwire included the album in her list of "the top 50 nu-metal albums of all time", ranking it fifteenth.

== Track listing ==
All songs written by Korn.

No.	Title	Length
1.	"Dead"	1:12
2.	"Falling Away from Me"	4:29
3.	"Trash"	3:27
4.	"4U"	1:42
5.	"Beg for Me"	3:53
6.	"Make Me Bad"	3:55
7.	"It's Gonna Go Away"	1:29
8.	"Wake Up"	4:07
9.	"Am I Going Crazy"	1:00
10.	"Hey Daddy"	3:44
11.	"Somebody Someone"	3:47
12.	"No Way"	4:07
13.	"Let's Get This Party Started"	3:41
14.	"Wish You Could Be Me"	1:07
15.	"Counting"	3:37
16.	"Dirty" ( (Note: The song "Dirty" ends at 3:43, with the rest of the song consisting of white noise.))	7:50
Total length:		53:16

Japanese edition bonus track
No.	Title	Length
17.	"Proud"	3:18
Total length:		56:34

== All Mixed Up (EP) ==
All Mixed Up

EP by Korn
- Released: February 9, 2001
- Recorded: 1996–1999
- Genres: Nu metal; alternative metal
- Length: 21:38
- Labels: Immortal; Epic

Korn chronology
Issues (1999)	All Mixed Up (2001)	Untouchables (2002)

Professional ratings
Review scores
Source	Rating
AllMusic	1.5/5 stars

All Mixed Up is an EP by Korn released as a bonus disc alongside the album Issues featuring previously unreleased mixes and a previously unreleased song. The EP was made available for purchase separately on February 9, 2001.

=== Track listing ===
No.	Title	Length
1.	"A.D.I.D.A.S." (Radio Mix)	2:34
2.	"Good God" (Dub Pistols Mix)	6:20
3.	"Got the Life" (Josh Abraham Mix)	4:01
4.	"Twist"/"Chi" (Live)	5:16
5.	"Jingle Balls"	3:27
Total length:		21:38

Weekly chart performance for All Mixed Up
Chart (2002)	Peak position
Scottish Albums (Official Charts)	97
UK Albums (Official Charts)	99

== Personnel ==
=== Korn ===
- Jonathan Davis – vocals, bagpipes, additional drums on "Dead", "Trash", "4U", "It's Gonna Go Away", "Wish You Could Be Me" and "Dirty", additional drum programming
- Fieldy – bass guitar, additional drum programming
- Munky – guitars
- Head – guitars
- David Silveria – drums

=== Additional personnel ===
- Jeffy Lube – additional drum programming
- Brendan O'Brien – producer, mixing
- Nick DiDia – recording
- Tobias Miller – additional engineering, editing
- Stephen Marcussen – mastering
- Andrew Garver – digitally editing
- Bryan Cook – assisting
- Karl Egsieker – assisting
- Ryan Williams – engineering
- Jeff Kwatinetz – executive producer
- The Firm – executive producers

== Charts ==
=== Weekly charts ===
Weekly chart performance for Issues
Chart (1999)	Peak position
Australian Albums (ARIA)	1
Austrian Albums (Ö3 Austria)	13
Belgian Albums (Ultratop Flanders)	28
Belgian Albums (Ultratop Wallonia)	44
Canadian Albums (Billboard)	2
Dutch Albums (Album Top 100)	13
European Albums (European Top 100 Albums)	8
Finnish Albums (Suomen virallinen lista)	4
French Albums (SNEP)	12
German Albums (Offizielle Top 100)	9
Greek Albums (IFPI)	6
Hungarian Albums (MAHASZ)	28
Icelandic Albums (Tónlist)	2
Italian Albums (FIMI)	41
Japanese Albums (Oricon)	19
Norwegian Albums (VG-lista)	10
New Zealand Albums (RMNZ)	2
Portuguese Albums (AFP)	2
Scottish Albums (Official Charts)	37
Swedish Albums (Sverigetopplistan)	42
Swiss Albums (Schweizer Hitparade)	86
UK Albums (Official Charts)	37
UK Rock & Metal Albums (Official Charts)	1
US Billboard 200	1

=== Year-end charts ===
1999 year-end chart performance for Issues
Chart (1999)	Position
Australian Albums (ARIA)	18
Canada Top Albums/CDs (RPM)	98

2000 year-end chart performance for Issues
Chart (2000)	Position
Belgian Albums (Ultratop Flanders)	98
Canadian Albums (Nielsen SoundScan)	134
US Billboard 200	19

=== Decade-end charts ===
Decade-end chart performance for Issues
Chart (2000–2009)	Position
US Billboard 200	147

== Certifications ==
Certifications and sales for Issues
Region	Certification	Certified units/sales
Australia (ARIA)	2× Platinum	140,000^{^}
Canada (Music Canada)	2× Platinum	200,000^{^}
Germany (BVMI)	Gold	150,000^{^}
Mexico (AMPROFON)	Gold	75,000^{^}
Netherlands (NVPI)	Gold	50,000^{^}
New Zealand (RMNZ)	Platinum	15,000^{^}
Poland (ZPAV)	Gold	50,000^{*}
United Kingdom (BPI)	Gold	100,000^{*}
United States (RIAA)	3× Platinum	3,000,000^{^}
^{*} Sales figures based on certification alone.^{^} Shipments figures based on certification alone.

== Bibliography ==
- Draper, Jason (2008). A Brief History of Album Covers. London: Flame Tree Publishing. pp. 342–343. ISBN 9781847862112. OCLC 227198538.
