= List of electronicore bands =

This is a list of bands that play electronicore, a music genre that blends metalcore with styles of electronic music.

== List of bands ==
- Abandon All Ships
- Arsonists Get All the Girls
- Asking Alexandria
- Attack Attack!
- Blind Channel
- Bring Me the Horizon
- The Browning
- Crossfaith
- Electric Callboy
- Enter Shikari
- Escape the Day
- Esprit D'Air
- Fear, and Loathing in Las Vegas
- His Statue Falls
- I See Stars
- I Set My Friends On Fire
- Jamie's Elsewhere
- One Morning Left
- Palisades
- Passcode
- We Butter the Bread with Butter

== See also ==
- List of Nintendocore bands
- List of electronic rock artists
