= Dunderpatrullen =

Swedish electronic music group

- Origin: Sweden
- Genres: Bitpop, Chiptune, Synthwave
- Instruments: DAW, Keyboard
- Years active: 2007-Present
- Label: Dunderpatrullen AB
- Members: Jim Lindgren; Stefan Björn; Patrik Andersson; Niklas Hillman
- Past members: Magnus Lemon; Erik Sjöstrand
- Website: http://dunderpatrullen.nu/

Dunderpatrullen is a Swedish electronic music group from Östersund, Jämtland. Their music is mostly based in the bitpop sub-genre of chiptune, but has deviated into other territories such as synthwave and EDM. Much of their inspiration comes from classic retro video game composition, often referencing and basing composition off of classic chiptune techniques in a modern context. The band has found success within the gaming enthusiast sphere, playing for events such as DreamHack and NärCon.

As of 2016, the band is under their own label, after previously being under Beard Monster AB of Warner Music Sweden.

They released their first album in 2007, the year after the band was formed, titled For Great Justice. Three years later in 2010, they would release their second, Analoga Steroider, followed up by Keygeneration in 2014. Since then, they are still producing music, turning to a singles release method before compiling the released songs into their next studio album. The first single of this series was released in 2019 titled Arcadia.

== History ==
=== Origin ===
In 1999, Jim Lindgren started Krull Productions, a name used online for videos created by him and others. Over time, this community developed into the ground work that would develop into Dunderpatrullen. The band would then be formed in 2006 and would soon start work on their first album.

=== 2007 - 2014 ===
Releasing their first studio album the following year that the band formed, For Great Justice, this album would set the stage for future releases. During this time, they also played their first live show at Storsjöteatern in Östersund

Three years later in 2010, they would deliver their second release with the EP Fan, vad han skrek när vi åt pizza här sist!. Soon after, they would release their second album the same year: Anologa Steroider. Afterwards, band member Magnus Lemon would leave to be succeeded by Patrik Andersson who is still with the band to this day.

In 2012, Dunderpatrullen released their first music video for the song Arga Leken, which attracted the attention of other artists covering the song. That same year, they released their single Oj, Vilken Överraskning!, which caught the attention of Swedish television and radio host Adam Alsing and Daniel Breitholtz, a former idol judge, resulting in a record deal.

In 2013, the band announced their new and fourth member, Erik Sjöstrand, who was formerly a member of the bitpop band Bossfight. The following year in 2014, the band released its third album, Keygeneration, and would go on to perform the album for many shows around Europe.

== Members ==
- Jim Lindgren (2007–present)
- Stefan Björn (2007–present)
- Patrik Andersson (2010–present)
- Niklas Hillman (2015–present)

=== Former members ===
- Magnus "Clemmons" Lemon (2007–2010)
- Erik Sjöstrand (2013–2017)

== Releases ==
Studio Albums

- 2007 – For Great Justice
- 2010 – Analoga Stereoider
- 2012 - Call Me Katla, Baby
- 2014 – Keygeneration

EP

- 2010 – Fan, vad han skrek när vi åt pizza här sist!

Singles

- 2012 – Arga Leken
- 2012 – Oj! Vilken Överraskning!
- 2015 – Crazy Swing
- 2018 – Dansbandstechno
- 2019 – Arcadia
- 2020 - Cellar Door
- 2020 - Ultima 2.0
- 2020 - Tally-Ho!
- 2021 - Disco Dancing Caravan Camping
