= Eightcubed =

Canadian electronic musician

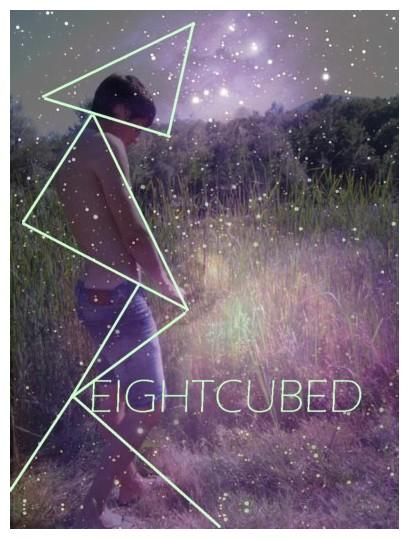
- Eightcubed singles cover for "Enter Light"

Background information
- Origin: Toronto, Ontario, Canada
- Genres: Electronic
- Occupations: Musician; DJ
- Years active: 2005–2015
- Labels: Abstract Core Records; RCRD LBL; Indie
- Website: soundcloud/eightcubed888.com

Eightcubed is a Canadian electronic music producer, DJ, and performer from Toronto, Ontario. His debut album, Simple Dance, was released in 2006 by Abstract Core Records. In 2008, "Heart Invaders" was released with a music video directed by computer animator Dan Swan and nationally aired on MuchMusic throughout 2008 to 2011. In 2009, he released City Life, an EP that received popular acclaim for its low-fi and retro- futuristic sound, heard in songs such as "Promise Me" and "The Island of Purple Waterfall". Another music video for the single "Enter Light" followed in 2011 with video animation by Andrea Simone. In a Detroit radio interview, Eightcubed explained the importance of the storytelling found in his music. In 2013, he released Sheath & Beyond EP, with the hit single "Comfort Temple", launching him into the Top 10 of many North American radio stations. He has been featured in Now Magazine, RCRD LBL, MTV Canada, and independent blogs.

== Musical style ==
Eightcubed's musical style has been described as "fantastical, mesmerizing, strangely addictive, innovative, retro-futuristic and whimsical". In early 2007, Cue Mix Magazine proclaimed that his sound was "fascinating and groundbreaking". Eightcubed has stated that he leaves his musical writing to be defined by critics and that his most ardent instrument is the computer.

== Discography ==
=== Albums ===
Year	Album	Record label
2006	Simple Dance	Abstract Core Records
2009	City Life	RCRD LBL
2011	High Arrrt	N/A
2013	Sheath & Beyond	Phoenix & Gold Records

=== Singles ===
Single	Year	Album	Chart Rank	Radio Station	City
"Sunrise"	2005	Simple Dance			
"Quiet Please"	2006	Simple Dance			
"Smell the Coffee"	2007	City Life			
"Heart Invaders"	2008	City Life	3	CHUO89.1	Ottawa
"Promise Me"	2008	City Life	8	CJLO1690	Montreal
"The Island of Purple Waterfall"	2009	"City Life"	3	CKXU88.3	Lethbridge
"Lighthouse"	2010	High Arrrt	2	CKXU88.3	Lethbridge
"Kiss Chaser"	2010	High Arrrt	17	CIUT89.5	Toronto
"Kiss Chaser (B- Side Version)"	2010	High Arrrt	8	CJSW90.9	Calgary
"Comfort Temple"	2013	Sheath & Beyond	2	CJAM99.1	Windsor

=== Remixes ===
- Björk "Aurora" (2010)
- The Pixies "Wave of Mutilation" (2010)
- Lady Gaga "Bad Romance" (2010)
- The Ramones "Blitzkrig Bop" (2011)
- Madonna "Another Suitcase" (2011)
- Dragonette "Let it Go" (2012)

== Videography ==
- "Heart Invaders" (2008) (directed by Dan Swan)
- "Enter Light" (2011) (animation by Andrea Simone)
