= Make Me Bad =

Single by Korn

from the album Issues
- Released: February 2000
- Recorded: 1999
- Genre: Nu metal
- Length: 3:55
- Label: Immortal/Epic
- Songwriters: Reginald Arvizu, Jonathan Davis, James Shaffer, David Silveria, Brian Welch
- Producer: Brendan O'Brien

Korn singles chronology
"Jingle Balls" (1999)	"Make Me Bad" (2000)	"Somebody Someone" (2000)

Music video
- "Make Me Bad" on YouTube

Make Me Bad is a song written and recorded by the American nu metal band Korn for their fourth studio album, Issues. Many Korn fans interpret the lyrics as being about frontman Jonathan Davis's struggle with alcohol and drug abuse, and his decision to get sober a year before the release of Issues. It was released as the album's second single in February 2000, achieving major success on U.S. and rock radio stations and in the U.K. The Alien-inspired music video is one of the most expensive videos Korn has ever filmed, featuring actors Brigitte Nielsen, Udo Kier, Tatjana Patitz, and Shannyn Sossamon. An acoustic medley of "Make Me Bad" and The Cure's "In Between Days" was performed with The Cure for the MTV Unplugged series in December 2006.

== Music video ==
The video was directed by Martin Weisz and features actresses Brigitte Nielsen, Tatjana Patitz, Shannyn Sossamon, and actor Udo Kier. Brigitte and Udo would later play villains in the 2000 film Doomsdayer. It premiered worldwide in February 2000 on the short-lived USA Network music show Farmclub, alongside Limp Bizkit's video for their single, "Break Stuff". Both groups made guest appearances to introduce their respective videos. "Make Me Bad" received heavy airplay on MTV and MTV2 at the time of its release. Toward the end of the video, the song "Dead," also from Issues, is heard in the background. "Make Me Bad" spent sixty-five days on MTV's Total Request Live, becoming Korn's fourth and final "retired" video on June 8, 2000.

=== Sickness in Salvation Mix ===
A reworked version of the video, featuring Butch Vig's "Sickness in Salvation" remix, aired occasionally during April and May 2000. It is included as an easter egg on the band's home video Deuce.

== MTV Unplugged Rendition ==
The acoustic rendition of this song on the album MTV Unplugged: Korn is performed as part of a medley with The Cure's "In Between Days," with The Cure as special guests.

== Appearances in Media ==
The song was used by apparel manufacturing company Puma in their advertisements during the period when Korn had a contract with the company. The Sybil Mix was also featured in the video game NHL Hitz 2002 when the game was paused.

== Track listing ==
=== US Radio Promo ===
- CD5" ESK 45584
1. "Make Me Bad" (radio edit) – 3:53
2. "Make Me Bad" (album version) – 3:55

=== Australian release ===
- CD5" 669191 2
1. "Make Me Bad" – 3:53
2. "Dirty" (Single Mix) – 3:56
3. "Make Me Bad" (Single Mix) – 4:11
4. "Make Me Bad" (Sickness in Salvation Mix) – 3:29
5. "Make Me Bad" (Danny Saber's Remix) – 4:20
6. "Make Me Bad" (Kornography Mix) – 4:43
7. "Make Me Bad" (Sybil Mix) – 5:15

== Chart performance ==
The song peaked at number seven on the Billboard Modern Rock Tracks chart. It also reached number nine on the Mainstream Rock Tracks chart.

=== Charts ===
Chart (2000)	Peak position
Australia (ARIA)	98
Iceland (Dagblaðið Vísir Top 20)	2
Italy (FIMI)	30
Italy (Hit Parade)	43
Scotland Singles (OCC)	26
UK Rock & Metal (OCC)	1
UK Singles (OCC)	25
US Bubbling Under Hot 100 (Billboard)	14
US Modern Rock Tracks (Billboard)	7
US Mainstream Rock Tracks (Billboard)	9
