= Karate High School =

American rock band

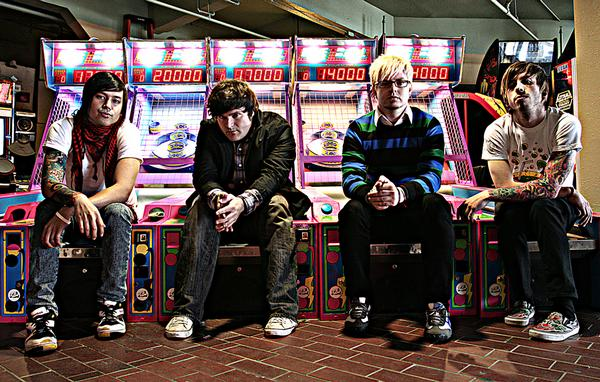
- Karate High School in 2009

Background information
- Also known as: KHS
- Origin: San Francisco, California, United States
- Genres: Post-hardcore; pop punk; Nintendocore; chiptune; alternative rock
- Years active: 2004–2010
- Labels: Eyeball; EVO; Evolution; Elizac
- Past members: Paul McGuire; Ray Bautista; Ken Kasier; Gabe Ausiello
- Website: Official website

Karate High School was an American rock band formed in San Francisco, California, in 2004 by frontman, multi-instrumentalist and producer Paul McGuire. On March 21, 2006, the band released their debut album, Arcade Rock. Karate High School's second album, The League Of Tomorrow, was released on September 4, 2007, which further honed the band's layered, keyboard-driven style of alternative rock. On November 11, 2008, Karate High School announced that they had signed to Eyeball Records, and would release a new record entitled Invaders on May 19, 2009. In early 2010 Paul McGuire announced that he was done producing music under the name Karate High School and has since chosen to go into other studies.

== History ==
Paul McGuire formed the band in 2004, and the band's name came from McGuire's love for "really cheesy B-rated horror movies" and came up with a name that sounded like them.

== Musical style ==
Karate High School's style evolved over their three records. Once described as an "aggressive blend of poppy punk, hyper post-hardcore, and eight-bit blips"; the band began as a spazzy, catchy, keyboard-driven rock act on their debut record, but grew and matured over the course of three records to a sound that crosses the genres of rock, punk, experimental, electronica, and power-pop. Their sound has often been referred to as synthcore. While 2007's The League of Tomorrow effortlessly gear-shifted through poppy, upbeat melodies to heavy electronica-fused pop-punk, their 2009 album Invaders focused on all of the aforementioned elements and further evolved the band's sound. The band's sound has also been called Nintendocore, but the band doesn't consider itself under the genre.

== Band members ==
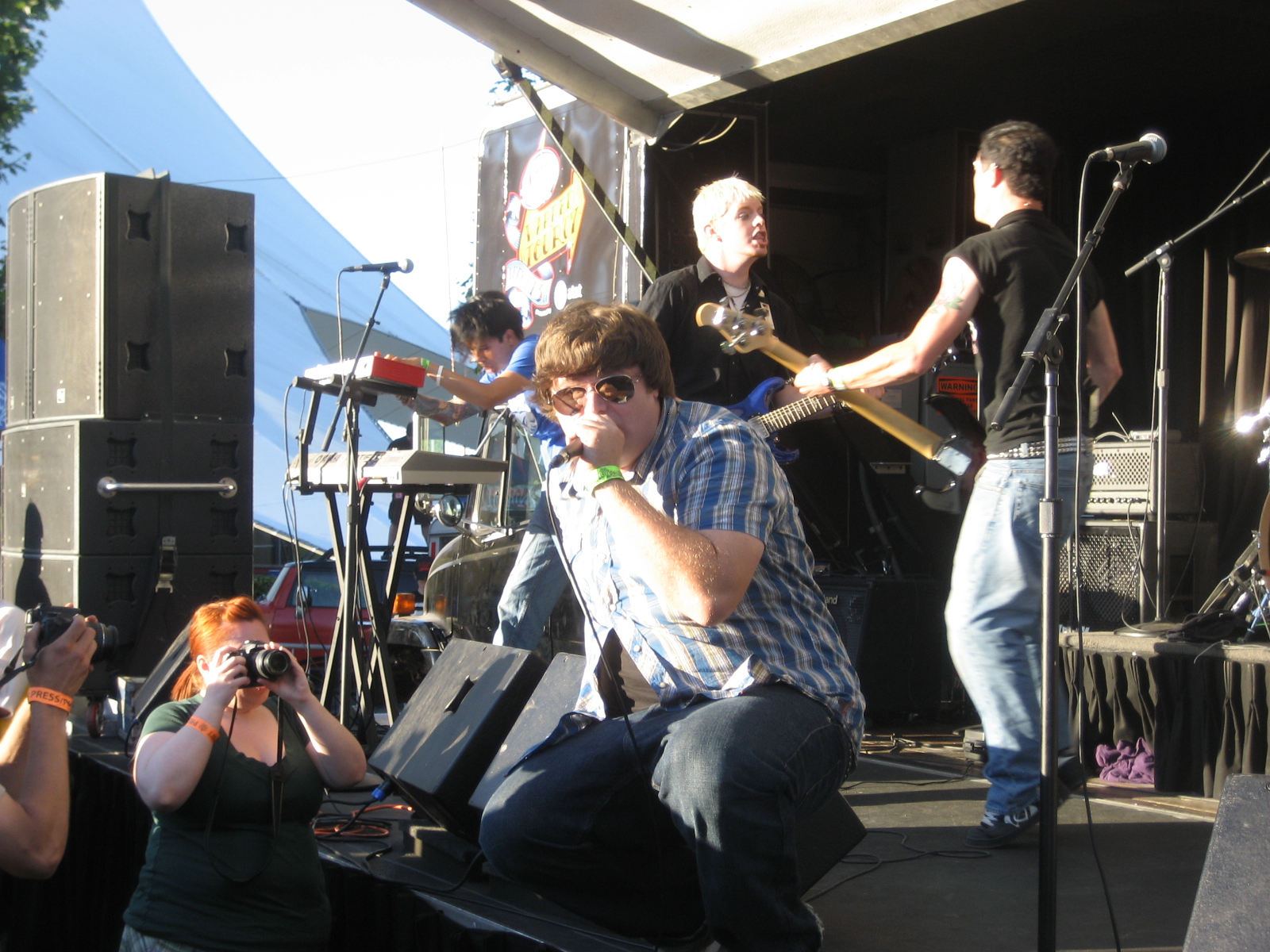
Karate High School in July 2007.

Karate High School was the songwriting project of Paul McGuire, and he wrote all the music and lyrics for the band. Ray Bautista joined the group as the keyboard player, and was the only member to be in the band since Arcade Rock. For recording purposes, Paul produced all three records and played all the instruments on The League Of Tomorrow. During the recording of Invaders, Geoff Garnett played guitar, Aaron McVeigh played drums, and Paul McGuire played keyboards, bass, and sang. In 2010, Paul McGuire announced that he was done producing music under the name Karate High School.

Former members and touring lineup

- Paul McGuire - vocals, keyboards, guitar, bass, producer (2004-2010)
- Gabe Ausiello - guitar (2004-2005)
- Sean Martin - drums (2004-2005)
- Paul Kriz - bass (2004-2005)
- Danny Glaspy - drums (2005-2009)
- Ken Kaiser - bass (2005)
- Tom Evans - bass (2006)
- Dan Kingdon - bass (2006-2007)
- Nathan Vega - bass (2007)
- Gideon Naude - bass (2007-2008)
- Aaron McVeigh - drums (2009-2010)
- Geoff Garnett - guitar (2009-2010)
- Ray Bautista - keyboard (2006-2010)

Timeline

== Discography ==
=== Studio albums ===
Title	Album details
Arcade Rock	Released: March 21, 2006; Label: Self-released, EVO Recordings, Evolution Music; Format: Digital download, CD
The League of Tomorrow	Released: September 4, 2007; Label: Self-released, EVO Recordings, Elizac Music; Format: Digital download, CD
Invaders	Released: May 19, 2009; Label: Eyeball Records; Format: Digital download, CD

=== Extended plays ===
Title	Details
Karate High School	Released: Unknown; Label: Self-released; Format: CD

=== Singles ===
Year	Title	Album
2007	"Burning Up for You"	The League of Tomorrow
2009	"Zombies Everywhere"	Invaders

=== Music videos ===
List of music videos with director(s)
Title	Year	Director(s)
"Good News and Bad News"	2006	Rabid Monkey Productions
"Burning Up for You"	2007	David Brodsky

=== Compilation appearances ===
- 2006 - Rising Stars 3
  - Features the track "Good News And Bad News"
- 2007 - Leak Volume #3
  - Features the track "Burning Up For You"
- 2007 - @United Vol.4 - Mash-Up Rock Show
  - Features the track "Burning Up For You"
- Unknown - [Just Listen To This]
  - Features the track "Good News And Bad News"
