= Falling Away from Me =

1999 single by Korn

Single by Korn

from the album Issues
- B-side: "Jingle Balls"
- Released: October 27, 1999 (South Park); October 28, 1999 (rock radio); December 6, 1999 (CD and vinyl)
- Recorded: 1999
- Genre: Nu metal
- Length: 4:31
- Label: Immortal; Epic
- Songwriters: Reginald Arvizu; Jonathan Davis; James Shaffer; David Silveria; Brian Welch
- Producer: Brendan O'Brien

Korn singles chronology
"Freak on a Leash" (1999)	"Falling Away from Me" (1999)	"Jingle Balls" (1999)

Music video
- "Falling Away from Me" on YouTube

"Falling Away from Me" is a song by American nu metal band Korn. It was released as the first single from their fourth album Issues, debuting in an episode of Comedy Central's animated series South Park, entitled "Korn's Groovy Pirate Ghost Mystery". The song went on to become one of Korn's most popular singles, with an anti-child abuse themed video topping MTV's Total Request Live for ten days.

In 2019, Joe Smith-Engelhardt of Alternative Press included the song in his list of "Top 10 nu-metal staples that still hold up today".

== Concept ==
Jonathan Davis explained: "The song is about domestic abuse and that there are ways to get help whether it's telling someone or calling a help line, there are ways to get out of those situations. No one has to be treated like that."

== Music video ==
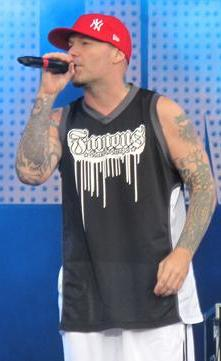
Fred Durst (pictured) directed the music video for "Falling Away from Me".

The music video for "Falling Away from Me" received its world premiere on MTV on November 26, 1999, during Spankin' New Music Week. It begins as a continuation of the famous video for "Freak on a Leash", starting with its closing animation. The video then transitions into live action as it shows a young girl (played by actress Jill Noel) clearly distraught by her abusive father. Inside her room, she opens a box and appears to see the band inside, performing below hanging lightbulbs. A crowd of young people have gathered outside the window, raising their arms in time to the beat as the band is then surrounded by flashes of green electricity, and then appear inside her bedroom with flashes of red electricity. As her father angrily approaches her room with a belt in his hand, one of the youths appears outside her window and helps her get outside. She leaves the house as the song ends and the crowd scatters. The band dissolves into red electricity and goes straight back into the box in her hands. She then runs off into the night just as her father finally opens the door to see her empty bedroom; no one is there except for the band's equipment. The video ends with a shot of the neighborhood with red lights showing in one bedroom in every house.

In the original version of the video, shortly before the band disappears into the box (once the teenage girl escapes through the window), Fred Durst made a "cameo" appearance in the video – his face appearing for a brief moment during one of the close-up shots of Jonathan Davis. Due to reasons which are somewhat unclear (it's rumoured that Davis spotted the cameo and objected), subsequent versions of the video have had the Fred Durst cameo removed.

The video enjoyed similar success to its predecessor, "Freak on a Leash", debuting on MTV's Total Request Live at number three, and reaching number one on its seventh day. It would eventually become Korn's third "retired" video on the program, with ten non-consecutive days at number one.

== MTV Unplugged rendition ==
Korn performed a memorable version of "Falling Away from Me" for the filming of MTV Unplugged in December 2006, featuring hand bells and a glass harmonica. It was also performed at the 2006 Download Festival with M Shadows, lead singer of Avenged Sevenfold, when lead vocalist Jonathan Davis had fallen ill.

== Critical reception ==
"Falling Away from Me" is widely considered to be one of Korn's best songs. In 2019, Loudwire ranked the song number four on their list of the 50 greatest Korn songs, and in 2021, Kerrang ranked the song number two on their list of the 20 greatest Korn songs.

== Appearances in media ==
- The song was first played on Comedy Central's animated series, South Park, in the episode "Korn's Groovy Pirate Ghost Mystery". The band members had a primary role in the Scooby-Doo-esque plot and performed the song at the end of the episode.
- The song is playable on Rock Revolution.
- The song is available as downloadable content for Rock Band 3.
- The song is sampled in the song "Hammer Dance" by the hip-hop group Slaughterhouse.

== Track listing ==
=== German release ===
- CD5"
1. "Falling Away from Me" (radio edit) – 4:31
2. "Jingle Balls" – 3:27
3. "Falling Away from Me" (a cappella) – 3:45

=== Australian release ===
- CD5"
1. "Falling Away from Me" – 4:31
2. "Falling Away from Me (Krust Remix)" – 8:29
3. "Jingle Balls" – 3:27
4. "Falling Away from Me (Mantronik Remix)" – 6:05
5. "Got the Life (Josh Abraham Remix)" – 4:01
6. "Falling Away from Me" (video)

=== Australian radio promo ===
- CD5"
1. "Falling Away from Me" (radio edit) – 4:31
2. "Falling Away from Me (Krust Remix)" – 8:29
3. "Jingle Balls" – 3:27
4. "Falling Away from Me (Mantronik Extended Remix)" – 6:05
5. "Got the Life (Josh Abraham Remix)" – 4:01

=== Australian Die Cut CD radio promo ===
- CD5"
1. "Falling Away from Me" – 4:31
2. "Falling Away from Me (Clean Version)" – 4:31

=== Swedish release ===
- CD5"
1. "Falling Away from Me" (radio edit) – 4:31
2. "Falling Away from Me" (a cappella) – 3:45

=== UK release ===
- CD5"
1. "Falling Away from Me" (radio edit) – 4:31
2. "Falling Away from Me (Krust Remix)" – 8:29
3. "Jingle Balls" – 3:27

=== UK promo ===
- CD5"
1. "Falling Away from Me (Mantronik Beatdown Formula)" – 6:06
2. "Falling Away from Me (Krust Remix)" – 8:29
3. "Falling Away from Me" – 4:31

== Charts ==
Chart (1999–2000)	Peak position
Australia (ARIA)	62
Belgium (Ultratip Bubbling Under Flanders)	17
Canada (Nielsen Soundscan)	21
Canada Rock/Alternative (RPM)	24
Europe (Eurochart Hot 100)	90
Finland Airplay (IFPI Finland)	35
Germany (GfK)	86
Iceland (Dagblaðið Vísir Top 20)	1
Latvia (Latvijas Top 40)	26
Netherlands (Dutch Top 40 Tipparade)	6
Netherlands (Single Top 100)	77
Scottish Singles Sales (Official Charts)	25
UK Singles (Official Charts)	24
UK Rock & Metal (Official Charts)	1
US Bubbling Under Hot 100 (Billboard)	8
US Alternative Airplay (Billboard)	7
US Mainstream Rock Airplay (Billboard)	7

=== Year-end charts ===
Chart (2000)	Position
US Mainstream Rock Tracks (Billboard)	25
US Modern Rock Tracks (Billboard)	24

== Certifications ==
Region	Certification	Certified units/sales
New Zealand (RMNZ)	Platinum	30,000^{‡}
United Kingdom (BPI)	Silver	200,000^{‡}
^{‡} Sales+streaming figures based on certification alone.

== See also ==
- "Korn's Groovy Pirate Ghost Mystery"
