= LukHash =

Polish electronic musician

- Born: Lukasz Polkowski; 17 August 1984 (age 42); Wrocław, Poland
- Genres: Chiptune, Synthwave
- Years active: 2006–present
- Labels: NewRetroWave Records; TimeSlave Recordings; Waxtooth Records
- Website: lukhash.com

Lukasz Polkowski, known professionally as LukHash, is a Polish electronic music composer and producer. He is best known for making chiptune music, often blended with other styles, particularly synthwave. LukHash incorporates 8-bit devices such as the Commodore 64, Game Boy and NES into a modern production setup.

His music has achieved chart success, with entries into the UK Official Album Downloads Chart. The album "Virtual Burnout" achieved a peak position at number 36 on October 19, 2023, while "We Are Stardust" secured the 38th position on April 22, 2021. In 2025 his album "Home Arcade" debuted at number 16 on the UK Album Downloads Chart.

LukHash's music is also featured in various gaming titles, such as the Double Dragon trilogy by DotEmu, Geometry Dash or the rhythm game osu!.

== Discography ==
=== Albums ===
- 2010: Dead Pixels
- 2011: Digital Memories
- 2012: Falling Apart
- 2015: The Other Side
- 2017: Glitch
- 2018: Ghosts
- 2019: Better Than Reality
- 2020: Transient Offworld
- 2021: We are Stardust
- 2021: Cyberchip
- 2023: Virtual Burnout
- 2025: Home Arcade
- 2026: Neon Airlines
