= Pixelh8 =

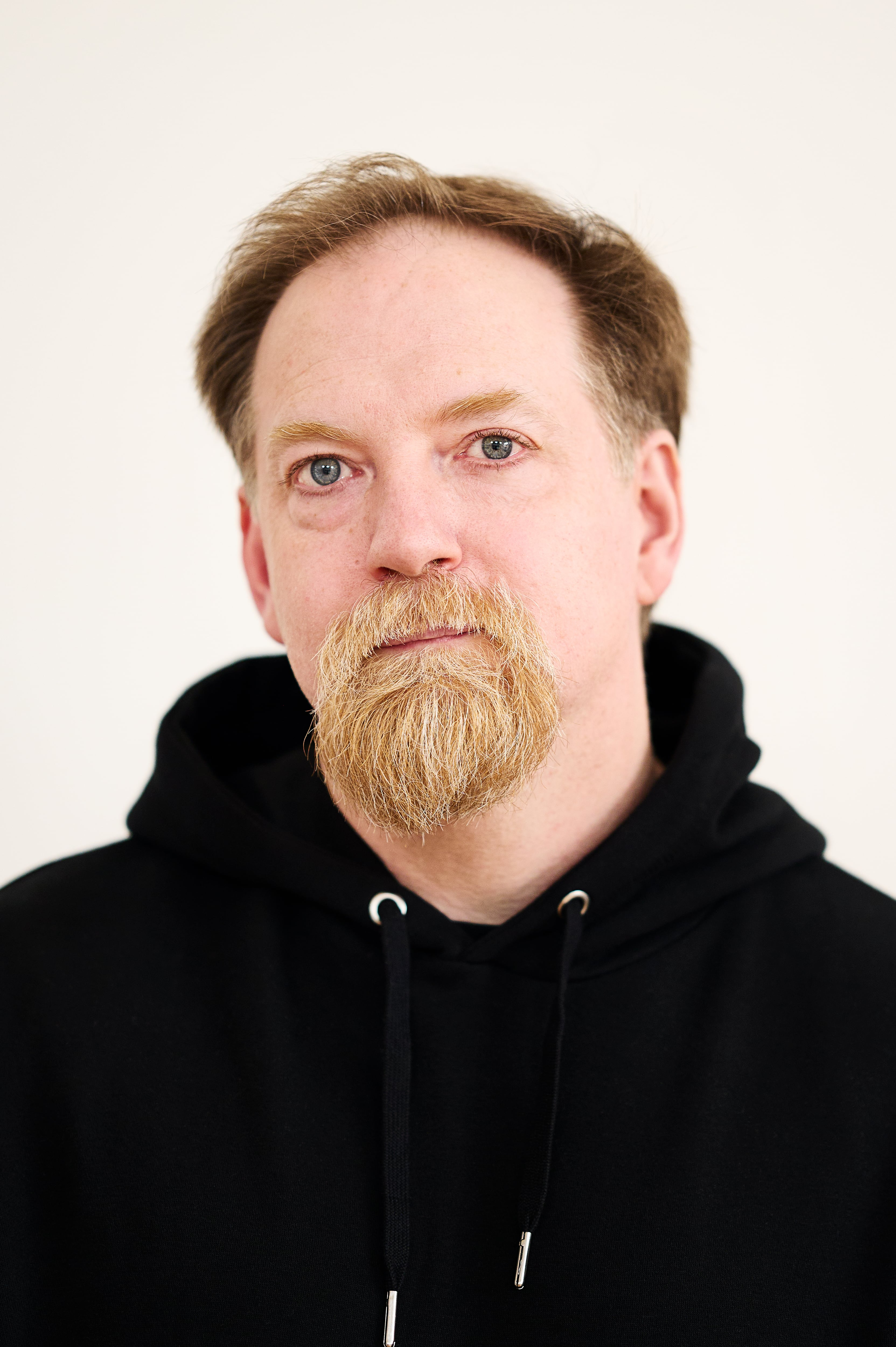
- Pixelh8 in 2024
- Born: Matthew Carl Applegate; March 1977 (age 49); Ipswich, England
- Occupations: Musician; composer; programmer; software designer; lecturer; tutor; video game designer; author
- Years active: 1999–present
- Title: CEO and founder of Creative Computing Club
- Musical career
- Genres: Chiptune; electronica; alternative dance; video game music
- Instruments: Game Boy; NES; Commodore 64; ZX Spectrum; BBC Micro
- Label: Hidden Youth
- Website: pixelh8.co.uk

Matthew Carl Applegate (born March 1977), better known by the stage name Pixelh8 (pronounced "pixel hate"), is a British chiptune composer, educator and screen actor.

== Career ==
=== Music ===
Pixelh8 combines the sounds of video games and electronic toys, often those that have been reverse engineered to avoid either copyright infringement or plagiarism to form original compositions, usually children's toys like Speak & Spells and Game Boys. Pixelh8 started off relatively unknown on Myspace and was widely discovered after winning a competition to open for Imogen Heap on her UK tour in 2006 and performing at Apple's iTunes Office in California. Pixelh8 also won Sound on Sound.

Pixelh8 has also designed music software such as Music Tech for the Nintendo Game Boy and the Pro Performer for the Nintendo Game Boy Advance and Nintendo DS which turn both machines into real time synthesizers and is currently developing software for other machines. Pixelh8 Music Tech software has been mentioned several times by Imogen Heap and was used in a track called "Tidal" on her "Ellipse" album.

Pixelh8 was the first headliner to the Nerdapalooza 2007 festival in California, other notable performances include performing for Huw Stephens on the BBC Introducing show December 2007 as well as Assembly 2008.

December 10, 2008 saw Pixelh8 perform at Maida Vale Studios for the BBC

January 23, 2009 The National Museum of Computing released a press statement saying that Pixelh8 would be composing and performing an entirely new piece of music for the museum, using some of the "earliest and rarest" machines such as Colossus computer and the Elliott 803 entitled "Obsolete?".

April 15, 2009 Pixelh8 released Pixelh8 Music Tech V2.0, Pro Performer, Drum Tech and Death Ray software free for download from his official website.

May 25, 2009 Pixelh8 provided BBC Radio 1 and BBC Radio 1Xtra with some of the backing tracks for their Big Gaming Weekend.

May 26, 2009 Pixelh8 re-wrote the theme tune for BBC World Service's Digital Planet the special version of the theme tune was made available from The Open University.

Pixelh8's music has also been featured on and done interviews with BBC Radio 1 Rob Da Bank, Zane Lowe and Huw Stephens' shows, BBC Radio 6 Tom Robinsons, Nemones and Music Weeks shows, BBC Radio 4, BBC Radio 1 Wales, BBC Radio Foyle, BBC Radio Suffolk, BBC Radio Three Counties, BBC Radio Norfolk, and on BBC News 24 E24, Ipswich Community Radio's Martin & Lewis Show, BBC Look East and BBC South Today.

On November 28, 2023, in an interview Pixelh8 announced a return to music after restoring a hard drive that was hit by lightning 12 years earlier. The new album "Hard Reset" was released on March 11, 2024. On the 2nd of July, 2024 it was revealed the album "Hard Reset" was nominated for the Mercury Prize, but was not successful at being shortlisted. He now has performed as the closing act of the ‘Ipswich Music Day’ on the 6th of July 2024.

On May 15, 2025 Pixelh8 announced the creation of a record label called "Hidden Youth Records" moving it from an imprint status to a formally incorporated company with an aim to train up musicians to understand how the music industry works.

=== Education ===
==== Academic Research ====
In 2011 Pixelh8 became a published author with his research into chiptune instruments, his first article "Cultural perceptions, ownership and interaction with re-purposed musical instruments" was published in the Journal of Music, Technology & Education, Volume 3, Issue 2–3, 2011. His follow up research "Re-designing the familiar: How effective are directional control pads in developing musicianship in 8 – 12 year old children?" became Chapter 7 in the 2016 "Music, Technology, and Education Critical Perspectives" published by Routledge. Pixelh8 has also been heavily featured and interviewed in a number of academic texts including Pamela Burnard' s "Musical Creativities in Practice" Chapter 8 "Interactive audio design" published by Oxford University Press and Kenneth B. McAlpine's 2018 "Bits and Pieces A History of Chiptunes".

==== Teaching ====
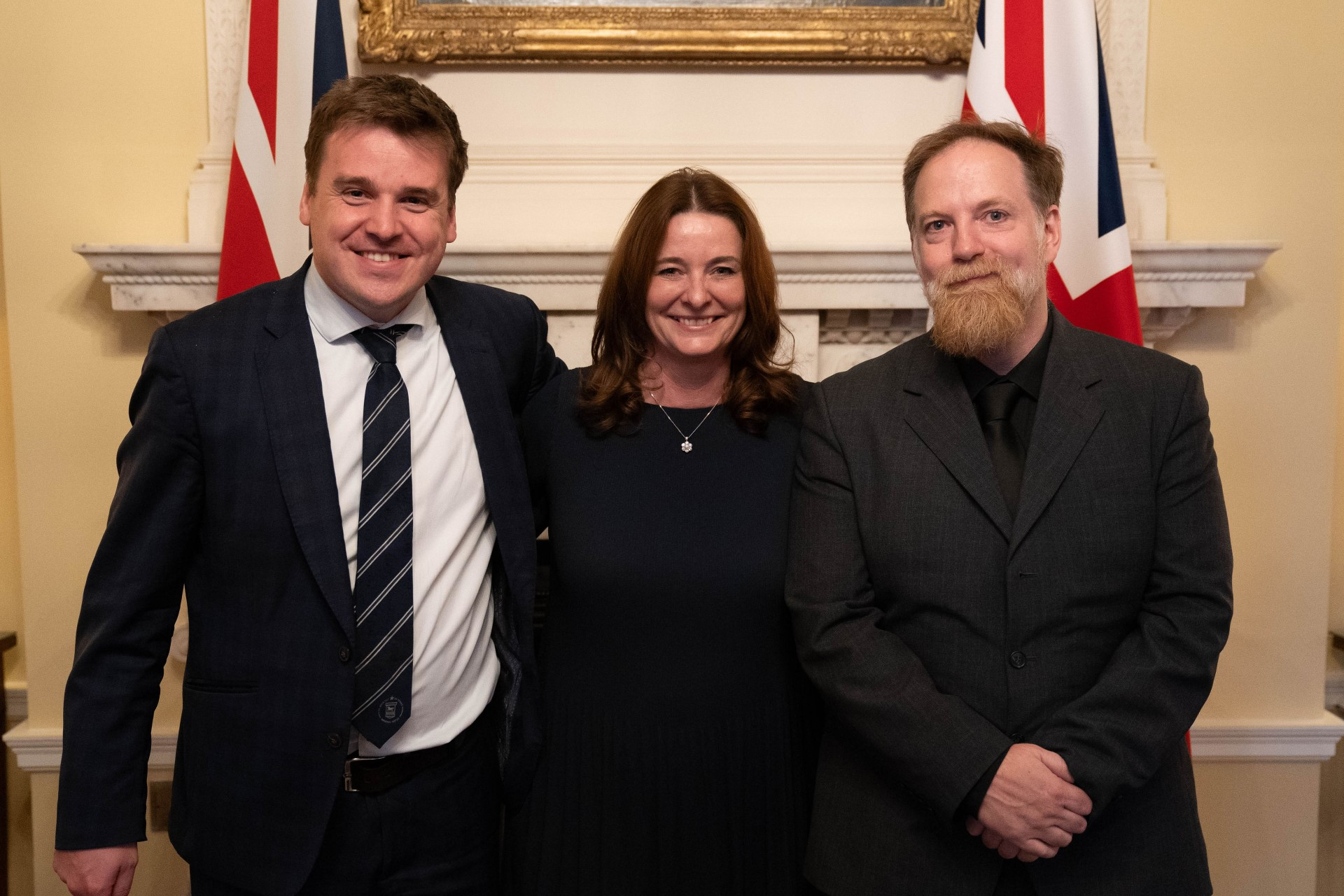
Left to Right, Tom Hunt MP. Gillian Keegan, Secretary of State for Education and Matthew C. Applegate at Number 10, Skills Champion Reception on October 24th, 2023

In 2012 Pixelh8 retired from music to set up an Alternative Provision technology school in Ipswich, Suffolk for 8 to 16-year-olds. The school won the Generation Code Hub of the Year 2018 award from Microsoft through UK Youth and Matthew C. Applegate won the Young Game Designer Mentor Award in 2019 from British Academy of Film and Television Arts.

On October 24, 2023, Matthew C. Applegate visited Number 10 Downing Street and met with the Rt Hon Gillian Keegan MP, Secretary of State for Education and Tom Hunt MP to be honoured as a Skills Champion at a special reception. Tom Hunt MP is quoted in saying "I would like to thank Matthew for taking the time to come to London. The work Creative Computing Club do is outstanding, and it is clear how committed they are to ensuring young people succeed in their chosen path. I know Matthew will continue the work he is so passionate about, helping children in Suffolk thrive.”

=== Film ===
In 2023 Matthew C. Applegate featured as a priest in the Telugu cinema film Gandeevadhari Arjuna.

== Discography ==
- Video Games Ruined My Life (2006)
- The Boy with the Digital Heart (2007)
- Obsolete? (2009)
- And The Revolution (2010)
- Observations (2010)
- OCARBOT (2011)
- Cross Side (2012)
- Automatic Repeat Request (2023)
- Hard Reset (2024)

== See also ==
- Chip Tune
