= Chiptune =

Style of synthesized electronic music

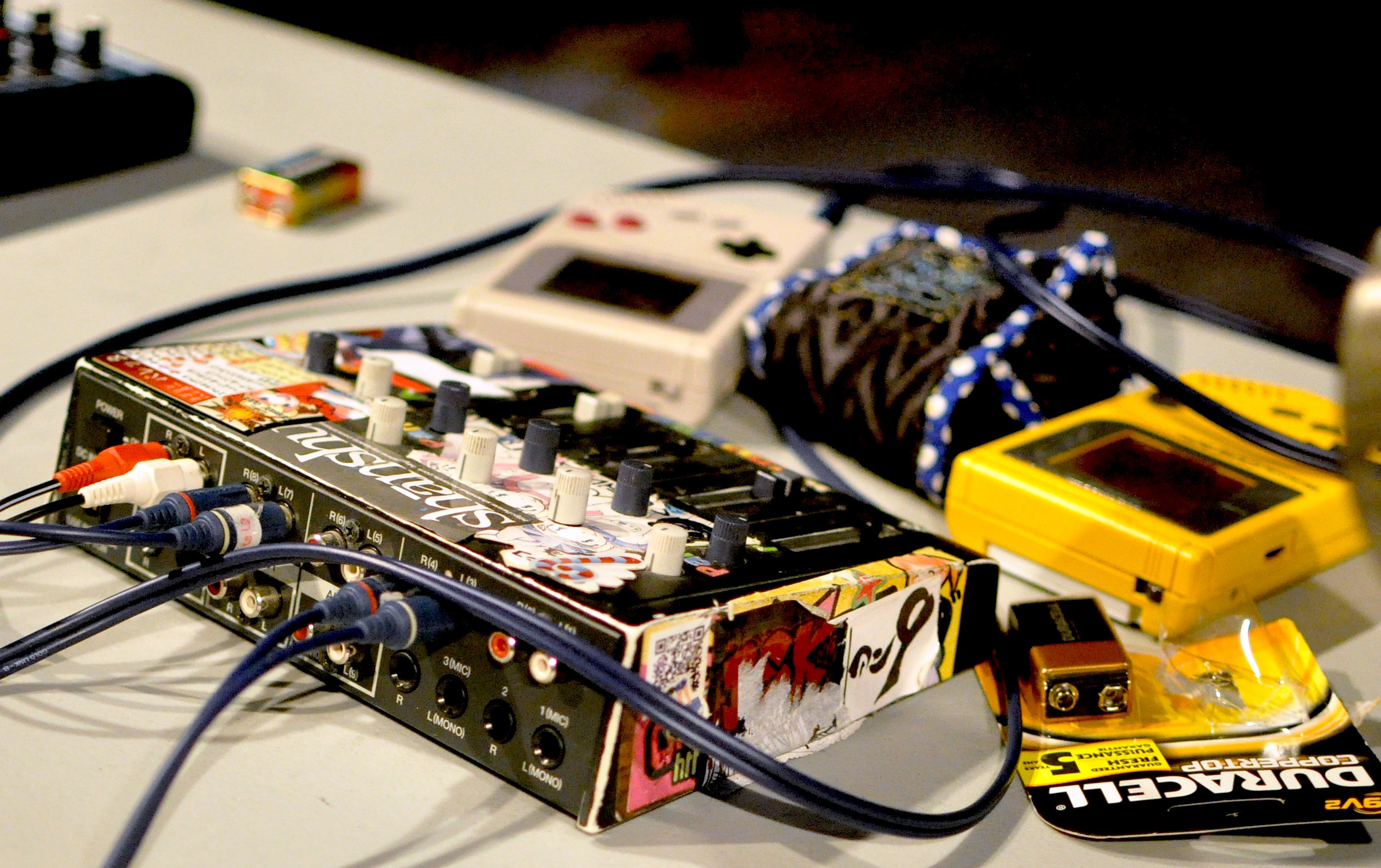
- A musician's chiptune setup, involving Game Boy consoles
- Other names: Chip music; 8-bit music; chiptunes; pico-pico
- Stylistic origins: Electronic; video game music; computer music; soundtrack; synthpop (Yellow Magic Orchestra); heavy metal (neoclassical metal); jazz fusion
- Cultural origins: Late 1970s to early 1980s, Japan
- Derivative forms: Wonky; hyperpop; kawaii future bass; synthwave

Subgenres
- Bitpop

Fusion genres
- Bleep techno; complextro; electro; electroclash; future bass; glitch; grime; house; Nintendocore; plugg; skweee

Regional scenes
- Japan

Local scenes
- New York City; Los Angeles

Other topics
- Artists; Demoscene

Chiptune, also called 8-bit music (although not all chiptune is 8-bit), is a style of electronic music and musical subculture made using the programmable sound generator (PSG) sound chips or synthesizers in vintage arcade machines, computers and video game consoles. The term is commonly used to refer to tracker format music using extremely basic and small samples that a pre-2000s computer or console could produce (this is the original meaning of the term), as well as music that combines PSG sounds with modern musical styles. It has been described as "an interpretation of many genres". Any existing song can be arranged in a chiptune style. It can be defined by choice of instrument, by timbre more than specific style elements.

== Technology ==
A waveform generator is a fundamental module in a sound synthesis system. A waveform generator usually produces a basic geometrical waveform with a fixed or variable timbre and variable pitch. Common waveform generator configurations usually included two or three simple waveforms and often a single pseudorandom noise generator (PRNG). Available waveforms often included pulse wave (whose timbre can be varied by modifying the duty cycle), square wave (a symmetrical pulse wave producing only odd overtones), triangle wave (which has a fixed timbre containing only odd harmonics but is softer than a square wave), and sawtooth wave (which has a bright raspy timbre and contains odd and even harmonics). Two notable examples of systems employing this technology were the Game Boy portable game console and the Commodore 64 personal computer. The Game Boy uses two pulse channels (switchable between 12.5%, 25%, 50% and 75% wave duty cycle), a 4-bit waveform channel, and a noise channel. The Commodore 64 however used the MOS Technology SID chip which offered 3 channels, each switchable between pulse, saw-tooth, triangle, and noise. Unlike the Game Boy, the pulse channels on the Commodore 64 allowed full control over wave duty cycles. The SID was a very technically advanced chip, offering many other features including ring modulation and adjustable resonance filters.

Due to the limited number of voices in early sound chips, one of the main challenges is to produce rich polyphonic music with them. The usual method to emulate it is via quick arpeggios, which is one of the most relevant features of chiptune music (along with its electronic timbres).

Some older systems featured a simple beeper as their only sound output, as the original ZX Spectrum and IBM PC; despite this, many skilled programmers were able to produce unexpectedly rich music with this bare hardware, where the sound is fully generated by the system's CPU by direct control of the beeper.

== History ==
=== 1951–1979: Precursors ===
External videos
- Science International: What Will They Think Of Next?, YouTube video

The earliest precursors to chip music can be found in the early history of computer music. In 1951, the computers CSIRAC and Ferranti Mark 1 were used to perform real-time synthesized digital music in public.

One of the earliest commercial computer music albums came from the First Philadelphia Computer Music Festival, held August 25, 1978, as part of the Personal Computing '78 show. The First Philadelphia Computer Music Festival recordings were published by Creative Computing in 1979. The Global TV program Science International (1976–1979) credited a PDP-11/10 for the music.

=== Mid-1970s–1980s: Video game origins ===
Chiptune music began to appear with the video game music produced during the golden age of video arcade games. An early example was the opening tune in Tomohiro Nishikado's arcade game Gun Fight (1975). The first video game to use a continuous background soundtrack was Tomohiro Nishikado's 1978 release Space Invaders, which had four simple chromatic descending bass notes repeating in a loop, though it was dynamic and interacted with the player, increasing pace as the enemies descended on the player. The first video game to feature continuous melodic background music was Rally-X, an arcade game released by Namco in 1980, featuring a simple tune that repeats continuously during gameplay. It was also one of the earliest games to use a digital-to-analog converter to produce sampled sounds. That same year, the first video game to feature speech synthesis was also released, Sunsoft's shoot 'em up arcade game Stratovox.

In the late 1970s, the pioneering synth-pop/electronic dance music group Yellow Magic Orchestra (YMO) were using computers to produce synthesized music. Some of their early music, including their 1978 self-titled debut album, were sampling sounds from popular arcade games such as Space Invaders and Gun Fight. In addition to incorporating sounds from contemporary video games into their music, the band would later have a major influence on much of the video game and chiptune music produced during the 8-bit and 16-bit eras. Sega's 1982 arcade game Super Locomotive for example featured a chiptune cover version of YMO's "Rydeen" (1979); several later computer games also covered the song, such as Trooper Truck (1983) by Rabbit Software as well as Daley Thompson's Decathlon (1984) and Stryker's Run (1986) arranged by Martin Galway.

By 1983, Konami's arcade game Gyruss utilized five sound chips along with a digital-to-analog converter, which were partly used to create an electronic rendition of J. S. Bach's Toccata and Fugue in D minor. In 1984, former YMO member Haruomi Hosono released an album produced entirely from Namco arcade game samples entitled Video Game Music, an early example of a chiptune record and the first video game music album. The record featured the work of Namco's chiptune composers: Toshio Kai (Pac-Man in 1980), Nobuyuki Ohnogi (Galaga, New Rally-X and Bosconian in 1981, and Pole Position in 1982), and Yuriko Keino (Dig Dug and Xevious in 1982).

=== Early 1980s–1994: FM synthesis ===
A major advance for chip music was the introduction of frequency modulation synthesis (FM synthesis), first commercially released by Yamaha for their digital synthesizers and FM sound chips, which began appearing in arcade machines from the early 1980s. Arcade game composers utilizing FM synthesis at the time included Konami's Miki Higashino (Gradius, Yie-Ar Kung Fu, Teenage Mutant Ninja Turtles) and Sega's Hiroshi Kawaguchi (Space Harrier, Hang-On, Out Run).

By the early 1980s, significant improvements to personal computer game music were made possible with the introduction of digital FM synthesis sound. Yamaha began manufacturing FM synth boards for Japanese computers such as the NEC PC-8801 and PC-9801 in the early 1980s, and by the mid-1980s, the PC-8801 and FM-7 had built-in FM sound. This allowed computer game music to have greater complexity than the simplistic beeps from internal speakers. These FM synth boards produced a "warm and pleasant sound" that musicians such as Yuzo Koshiro and Takeshi Abo utilized to produce music that is still highly regarded within the chiptune community. In the early 1980s, Japanese personal computers such as the NEC PC-88 and PC-98 featured audio programming languages such as Music Macro Language (MML) and MIDI interfaces, which were most often used to produce video game music.

Fujitsu also released the FM Sound Editor software for the FM-7 in 1985, providing users with a user-friendly interface to create and edit synthesized music.

In 1987, FM synthesis became available for Western computers when Canadian company Ad Lib released the AdLib Music Synthesizer Card for the IBM Personal Computer, while Singapore-based Creative Labs incorporated the AdLib card's sound chip into its Sound Blaster card in 1989. Both cards were widely supported by MS-DOS game developers in the late 1980s and early 1990s.

The widespread adoption of FM synthesis by consoles would later be one of the major advances of the 16-bit era, by which time 16-bit arcade machines were using multiple FM synthesis chips. A major chiptune composer during this period was Yuzo Koshiro. Despite later advances in audio technology, he would continue to use older PC-8801 hardware to produce chiptune soundtracks for series such as Streets of Rage (1991–1994) and Etrian Odyssey (2007–present). His soundtrack to The Revenge of Shinobi (1989) featured house and progressive techno compositions that fused electronic dance music with traditional Japanese music. The soundtrack for Streets of Rage 2 (1992) is considered "revolutionary" and "ahead of its time" for its "blend of swaggering house synths, dirty electro-funk and trancey electronic textures that would feel as comfortable in a nightclub as a video game." For the soundtrack to Streets of Rage 3 (1994), Koshiro created a new composition method called the "Automated Composing System" to produce "fast-beat techno like jungle", resulting in innovative and experimental sounds generated automatically. Koshiro also composed chiptune soundtracks for series such as Dragon Slayer, Ys, Shinobi, and ActRaiser. Another important FM synth composer was the late Ryu Umemoto, who composed chiptune soundtracks for various visual novel and shoot 'em up games.

=== 1986–present: SID music culture ===
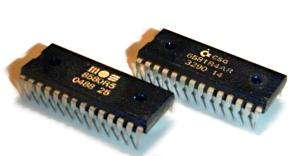
MOS 6581 and 8580 Commodore 64 SID chips

Later on, several demo groups moved to using their own music instead of ripped game music. In 1986, Jeroen "Red" Kimmel studied Rob Hubbard's player routine and used it for original demo songs before writing a routine of his own in 1987. Hobbyists were also writing their own dedicated music editor software, such as Chris Hülsbeck's Soundmonitor which was released as a type-in listing in a 1986 issue of the German C-64 magazine 64'er.

The practice of SID music composition has continued seamlessly until this day in conjunction with the Commodore 64 demoscene. The High Voltage SID Collection, a comprehensive archive of SID music, contains over 55,000 pieces of SID music.

== Mainstream popularity ==
The heyday of chiptune music was the 1980s. The earliest commercial chiptune records produced entirely from sampling arcade game sounds have existed since the mid-1980s, an early example being Haruomi Hosono's Video Game Music in 1984. Though entirely chiptune records were uncommon at the time, many mainstream musicians in the pop rock, hip-hop and electronic music genres were sampling arcade game sounds and bleeps during the golden age of video arcade games (late 1970s to mid-1980s), as early as Yellow Magic Orchestra's "Computer Game" in 1978. Buckner & Garcia's "Pac-Man Fever" and the album of the same name were major hits in 1982. Arcade game sounds were one of the foundational elements of the electro music genre, which in turn inspired many other electronic dance music genres such as techno and house music, which were sometimes referred to as "bleep music". Space Invaders inspired Player One's "Space Invaders" (1979), which in turn provided the bassline for Jesse Saunders' "On and On" (1984), the first Chicago house track. Warp's record "Testone" (1990) by Sweet Exorcist sampled video game sounds from Yellow Magic Orchestra's "Computer Game" and defined Sheffield's bleep techno scene in the early 1990s.

After the 1980s, however, chiptune music began declining in popularity. Since then, up until the 2000s, chip music was rarely performed live and the songs were nearly exclusively spread as executable programs and other computer file formats. Some of the earliest examples of record label releases of pure chip music can be found in the late 1990s. Chiptune music began gaining popularity again towards the end of the 1990s. The first electroclash record, I-F's "Space Invaders Are Smoking Grass" (1997), has been described as "burbling electro in a vocodered homage to Atari-era hi-jinks".

By the mid-2000s, 8-bit chip music began making a comeback in mainstream pop music, when it was used by acts such as Beck (for example, the 2005 song "Girl"), The Killers (for example, the 2004 song "On Top"), No Doubt with the song "Running", and particularly The Postal Service in many of their songs. The low-quality digital PCM styling of early game music composers such as Hiroshi Kawaguchi also began gaining popularity. In 2003, the J-pop girl group Perfume, along with producer Yasutaka Nakata, began producing music combining chiptunes with synth-pop and electro house; their breakthrough came in 2007 with Game, which led to other Japanese female artists using a similar electronic style, including Aira Mitsuki, immi, Mizca, SAWA, Saori@destiny, and Sweet Vacation. Electro house producer Deadmau5 started his career in the late 1990s, with a chiptune and demoscene movements-influenced sound. Three self-released compilations, Project 56, deadmau5 Circa 1998–2002 and A Little Oblique, were finished in 2006.

In 2007, the entirely chiptune album 8-Bit Operators: The Music of Kraftwerk was released on major mainstream label Astralwerks/EMI Records, which included several prominent and noted chipmusicians, including Nanoloop creator Oliver Wittchow, and LittleSoundDJ creator Johan Kotlinski who appears as the artist Role Model. Kraftwerk founding member Ralf Hütter personally selected the tracks. A vinyl 12-inch single version was released on February 24, 2007 as a precursor to the full-length CD, and reached as high as number 17 on the Billboard magazine Hot Dance Singles Sales Chart. In March 2007, the CD release reached as high as number 1 on the CMJ RPM (North American college Electronic) charts. Edinburgh-born electronic musician Unicorn Kid has helped further popularize chiptune, especially with the song "True Love Fantasy" and other songs from the EP "Tidal Rave" being played on late night radio, including on BBC Radio 1, where he played live on the Festive Festival 2011. In Canada, Eightcubed and Crystal Castles helped the popularity further via the Toronto underground club scene and created a lasting impression with the music video "Heart Invaders" debuting on MuchMusic in 2008 and the single "Alice Practice" hitting 29th on NME "150 Best Tracks of the Past 15 Years".

During the late 2000s, a new wave of chiptune culture took place, boosted by the release of software such as LittleSoundDJ for the Game Boy. This new culture has much more emphasis on live performances and record releases than the demoscene and tracker culture, of which the new artists are often only distantly aware. In recent years, 8-bit chiptune sounds, or "video game beats", have been used by a number of mainstream pop artists. Examples include artists such as Kesha (most notably in "Tik Tok", the best-selling single of 2010), 50 Cent with the hit single "Ayo Technology", Robyn, Snoop Dogg, Eminem (for example, "Hellbound"), Nelly Furtado, and Timbaland. The influence of video game sounds can also be heard in contemporary British electronica music by artists such as Dizzee Rascal and Kieran Hebden, as well as in heavy metal bands such as DragonForce. Grime music in particular samples sawtooth wave sounds from video games which were popular in East London. Some dubstep producers have also been influenced by video game chiptunes, particularly the work of Yuzo Koshiro. In 2010, a BBC News article stated that the "sights and sounds of old-school games" (naming Frogger and Donkey Kong as examples) are "now becoming a part of mainstream music and culture." Complextro pioneer Porter Robinson has also cited video game sounds, or chiptunes, as an influence on his style of music along with 1980s analog synth music. In 2022, trap music producer Popstar Benny cited video game sounds as one of the foundations for the plugg music genre.

== Tracker chiptunes ==
The Commodore Amiga (1985) with its sample-based sound generation distanced the concept of microcomputer music away from plain chip-synthesized sounds. Amiga tracker music software, beginning from Karsten Obarski's Ultimate Soundtracker (1987), inspired great numbers of computer enthusiasts to create computer music. As an offshoot of the burgeoning tracker music culture, a type of tracker music reminiscent of Commodore 64 SID music was born, that utilized simple waveforms instead of digitized samples. This type of music with small samples came to be called "chiptunes" referring to Amiga's chip memory where such samples would easily fit.

Earliest examples of tracker chiptunes date back to 1989 and are attributed to the demoscene musicians 4mat, Baroque, TDK, Turtle and Duz. Tracker chiptunes are based on very short looped waveforms which are modulated by tracker effects such as arpeggio, vibrato, and portamento. A very common loop length is 128 samples, which at an approximate sample rate of 17 kHz misses a C note by a few cents.

There is at least one commercial game for the Amiga, Nebulus II, that used chiptune style music, although with some conventional sampled instrument sounds as well as speech. The game apparently was initially planned for release for the C64 but was canceled.

The small amount of sample data made tracker chiptunes far more space-efficient than most other types of tracker music, which made them appealing to size-limited demoscene demos and crack intros. Tracker chiptunes have also been commonly used in other warez scene executables such as keygens.

Nowadays the term "chiptune" is also used to cover chip music using actual chip-based synthesis, but some sources such as the Amiga Music Preservation project still define a chiptune specifically as a small tracker module. Modern trackers used today include OpenMPT, Famitracker, Furnace and Goattracker.

== Contemporary chiptune music ==
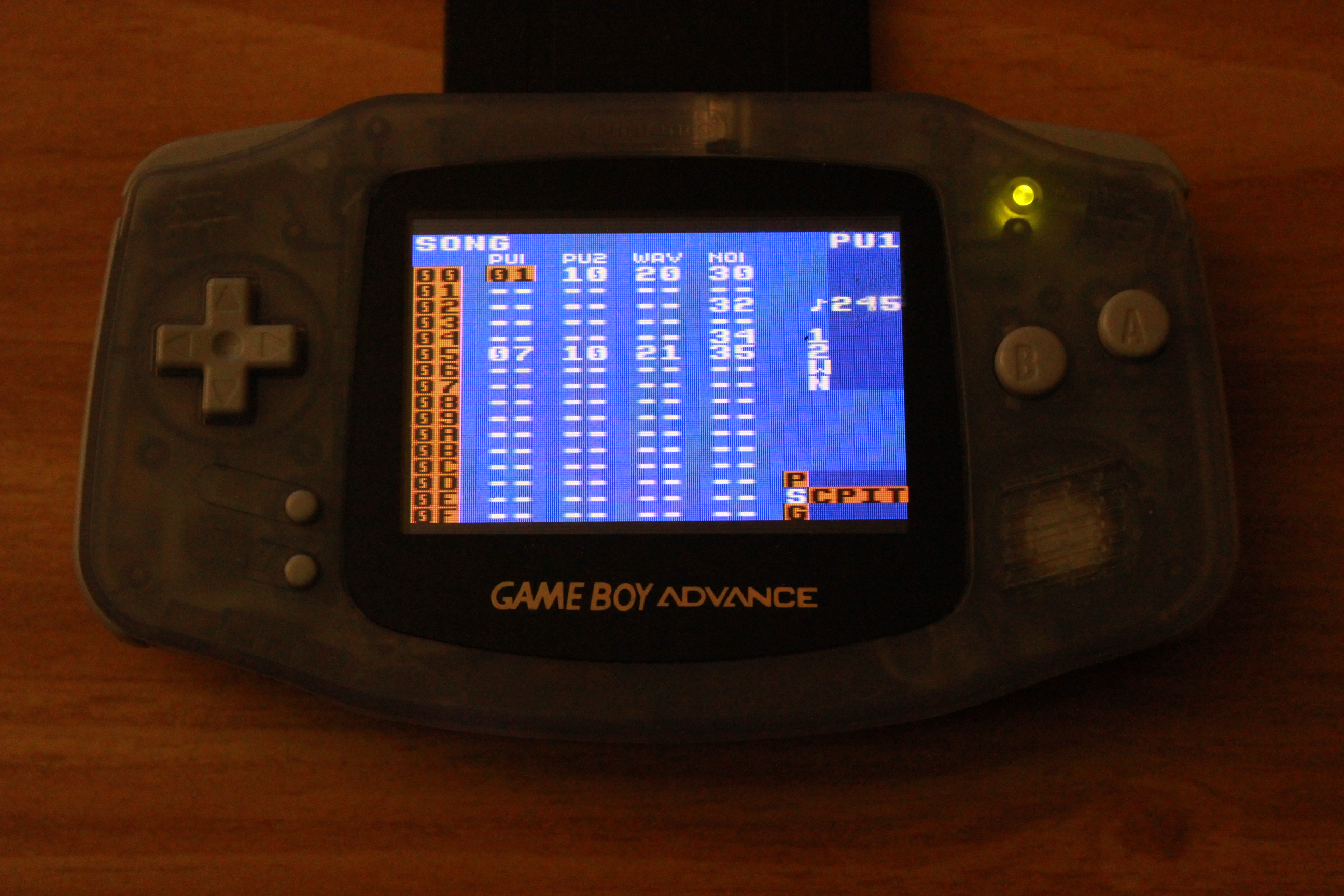
Little Sound DJ loaded onto a Game Boy Advance

Skip Cloud – "The Adventure Lights" (2011)

Drozerix – "Computer Adventures" (2012)
These are examples of modern-day chiptune tracks distributed as stand-alone music files without being a part of a video game soundtrack.

The chip scene has become relevant thanks to "compos" being held, groups releasing music disks and with the cracktro/demo scene. New tracker tools are used for making chip sounds available to less tech-savvy musicians. The NES platform has the MidiNES, a cartridge that turns the system into a full blown hardware MIDI controlled synthesizer. Around 2007, the Mssiah was released for the Commodore 64, which is very similar to the MidiNES, but with greater parameter controls, sequencing, analog drum emulation, and limited sample playback. The Commodore PET has the open-source PetSynth software, which uses the PET's 6522 chip for sound, allows the computer to be played like a piano keyboard, and features many effects. For MS-DOS, Fast Tracker is one of the most famous chiptune makers because of the ability to create hand-drawn samples with the mouse. Chiptune artist Pixelh8 has also designed music software such as Music Tech for the Game Boy and the Pro Performer for the Game Boy Advance and Nintendo DS which turn both machines into real time synthesizers.

There have been a number of television segments featuring chiptunes and chip music artists in the past few years. On April 11, 2005, 8 Bit Weapon played their songs "Bombs Away" and "Gameboy Rocker" on G4's Attack of the Show live broadcast Episode #5058. In 2008, as a parody of Masterpiece Theatre, the first four episodes of Boing Boing Video's SPAMasterpiece Theater opened with a chiptune remix of Jean-Joseph Mouret's "Rondeau: Fanfare" (1735) by Hamhocks Buttermilk Johnson. Another chipmusic feature included little-scale, Dot.AY, Ten Thousand Free Men & Their Families and Jim Cuomo on the Australian television series Good Game in 2009.

The Electronic Frontier Foundation in December 2010 used a faux 8-bit game with an 8-bit sound track by crashfaster to demonstrate its notable legal achievements for that year.

In March 2012, the Smithsonian American Art Museum's "The Art of Video Games" exhibit opened featuring a chipmusic soundtrack at the entrance by artists 8 Bit Weapon and ComputeHer. 8 Bit Weapon also created a track called "The art of Video Games Anthem" for the exhibit. In September 2015, the first music compilation based on Domo (NHK), Domo Loves Chiptune, was released on iTunes, Amazon, and all major music streaming services. The compilation features top artists in the Chiptune genre such as Anamanaguchi and Disasterpeace. Domo Loves Chiptune also features the first Chiptune remix of the Domo theme song by Mystery Mansion. The New York City chiptune scene was also the subject of a documentary called Reformat the Planet by 2 Player Productions. This film was an official selection at the 2008 South by Southwest.

Chip music has returned to 21st-century gaming, either in full-chip music style or using chip samples in the music. Popular games that feature chiptune elements in their soundtracks include Shovel Knight and Undertale.

== Events ==
Events take place all around the world that focus around the celebration and recognition of chiptune music.

=== MAGFest's Chipspace ===
In the United States, during Super MAGFest—a yearly convention that hosts a variety of video game-related events—popular chiptune artists such as goto80 and Chipzel have previously performed on the Concert Hall mainstage. A chiptune-focused mainstage show (aptly named "Chip Rave") typically occurs on the third day of the convention within the concert hall and has featured countless prominent faces in the chiptune community.

Super MAGFest also holds a continuous venue called Chipspace, a place where participants in the chiptune community go on-stage and perform their music through an open mic system. Originally started by Chiptunes=WIN founder Brandon L. Hood in 2012 and maintained by geekbeatradio, Chipspace has evolved over the course of MAGFest's lifespan to bring chiptune fans closer together. Among these daily performances are showcases, many of which are curated by chiptune netlabels such as Chiptunes = WIN, geekbeatradio, and more.

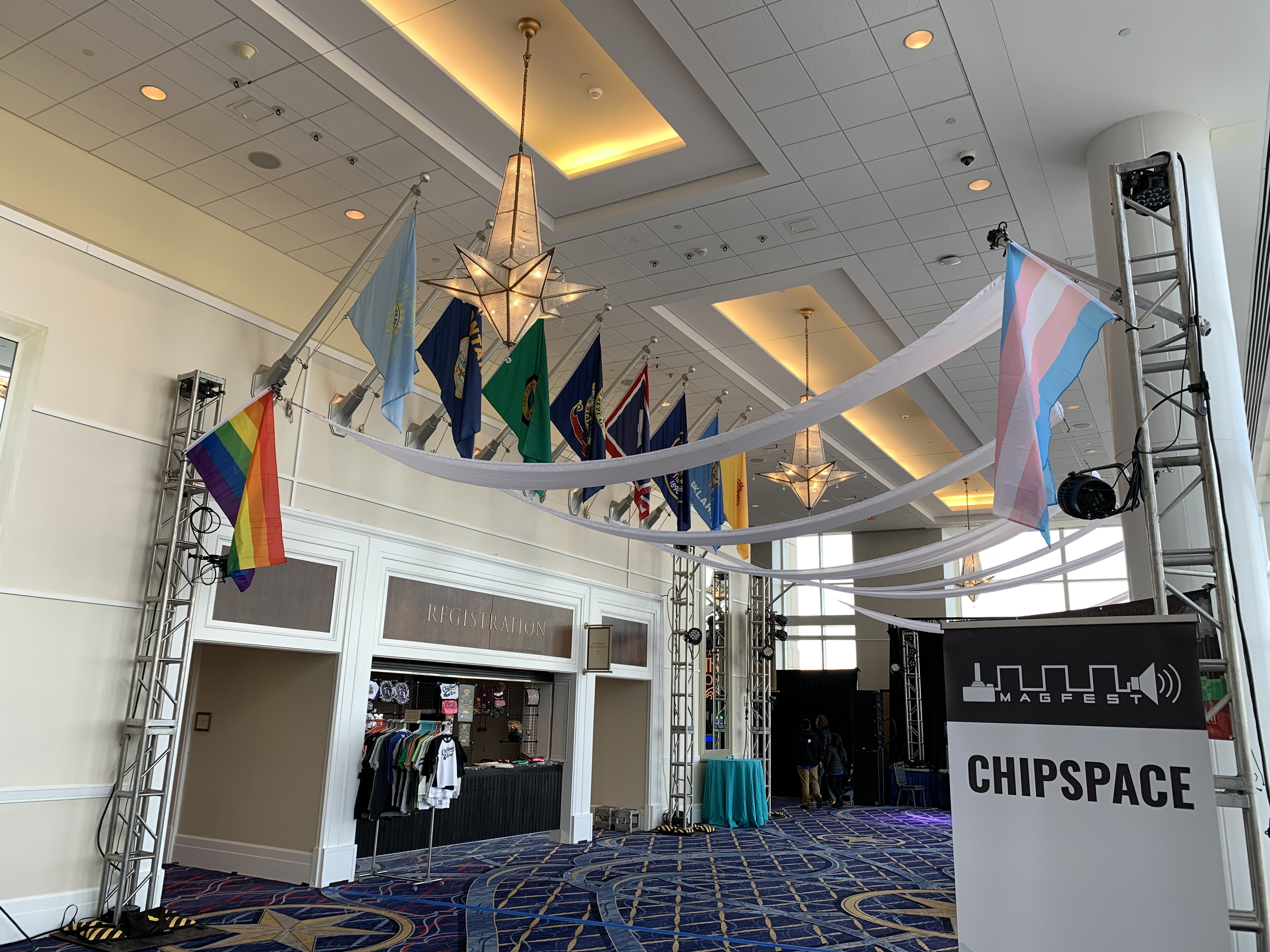
The crowd area and marketplace for Chipspace during MAGFest 2020

== See also ==
- List of chiptune artists
- Pixel art
- Computer music
- Nerd music
- Module file
- Frequency modulation synthesis
- Ludomusicology

== Suggested viewing ==
- 8 Bit: A Documentary about Art and Videogames (2006, dir. Marcin Ramocki and Justin Strawhand) - Chiptune and contemporary art in video game culture
- Reformat the Planet (2008, dir. Paul Owens) – 2000s New York chiptune scene with focus on Blip Festival
- The Chiptune Story (2018, dir. Steven Fletcher) - The history of chiptune featuring interviews with Rob Hubbard and Chris Huelsbeck
