= Deuce (video) =

Video by Korn
- Released: June 11, 2002
- Recorded: 1994–1999
- Genre: Nu metal; alternative metal
- Length: 150:00
- Label: Epic Music Video; Immortal
- Director: Nathan Cox
- Producer: Nathan Cox

Korn chronology
| Who Then Now? (1997) | Deuce (2002) | Live (2002) |

Deuce is the second video album by American nu metal band Korn. It was released on June 11, 2002, on the same day as the band's fifth studio album, Untouchables. It was certified platinum by the RIAA in July 2002. Deuce includes the band's biographical video, Who Then Now?, as well as music videos from albums Korn up to Issues. Other extras include biographies of each band member, gags, behind-the-scenes and live concerts.

== Track listing ==
1. "Blind"
2. "Shoots And Ladders"
3. "Clown"
4. "Faget"
5. "A.D.I.D.A.S."
6. "Got the Life"
7. "Freak on a Leash"
8. "Falling Away from Me"
9. "Make Me Bad"
10. "Somebody Someone"

== See also ==
- Korn video albums
