= Live on the Other Side =

Video by Korn
- Released: June 20, 2006
- Recorded: November 29, 2005
- Venue: Hammerstein Ballroom (New York City)
- Genre: Nu metal; alternative metal
- Length: 78:21
- Label: Virgin; EMI
- Director: Lawrence Jordan
- Producer: Scott Lochmus

Korn chronology
Live (2002)	Live on the Other Side (2006)	Live at Montreux 2004 (2008)

Live on the Other Side is the second live video album by American nu metal band Korn. It contains footage of the band's first US show in 2005, played at Hammerstein Ballroom in New York City on November 29, 2005. It is Korn's first live album as a quartet without their original guitarist Brian "Head" Welch, who departed from the band in 2005. The album also includes documentary, backstage videos, and interviews with the band. The first 70,000 copies of Live on the Other Side contained a voucher that gave opportunity to be exchanged for two tickets for the 2006 edition of the Family Values Tour.

== Track listing ==
The album contains the following tracks:

1. Intro
2. "Here to Stay" (from Untouchables)
3. "Twist" (from Life Is Peachy)
4. "Got the Life" (from Follow the Leader)
5. "Liar" (from See You on the Other Side)
6. "A.D.I.D.A.S." (from Life Is Peachy)
7. "Coming Undone" (from See You on the Other Side)
8. "Dirty" (from Issues)
9. "Falling Away from Me" (from Issues)
10. "Twisted Transistor" (from See You on the Other Side)
11. "Did My Time" (from Take a Look in the Mirror)
12. "Shoots and Ladders" (from Korn)
13. "One" (Metallica cover) (from Take a Look in the Mirror)
14. "Freak on a Leash" (from Follow the Leader)
15. "Another Brick in the Wall" / "Goodbye Cruel World" (Pink Floyd cover) (both from Greatest Hits, Vol. 1)
16. "Blind" (from Korn)
17. "Somebody Someone" (from Issues)
18. "Hypocrites" (from See You on the Other Side)
19. "Y'All Want a Single" (from Take a Look in the Mirror)

Bonus features

- "See You on the Other Side" – Footage of a selection of Korn contest winners riding from London to New York with the band in their private jet "Korn Air Force One"
- "See Who's on the Other Side" – Interviews with band members and the tour's production crew
- "Coming Undone" – Live video of "Coming Undone", consisting of footage from the concert, dubbed with the studio track

== Personnel ==
Korn

- Jonathan Davis – vocals, bagpipes
- David Silveria – drums
- Munky – rhythm and lead guitar, backing vocals
- Fieldy – bass

Other

- Rob Patterson – additional guitar, backing vocals
- Scott Lochmus – producer
- Peter Katis, Jeffrey Kwatinetz – executive producers
- Sean Fullan – editor
- Lawrence Jordan – director
- Alien Media – art design
- Jonathan S. Wallace – bonus features

== See also ==
- Korn video albums
