= Live (Korn video) =

Video by Korn
- Released: November 19, 2002
- Recorded: June 10, 2002
- Venue: Hammerstein Ballroom (New York City)
- Genre: Nu metal; alternative metal
- Length: first DVD - 61:27 second DVD - 67:55
- Label: Epic Music Video
- Director: Jim Gable
- Producer: Chris Kraft

Korn chronology
Deuce (2002)	Live (2002)	Live on the Other Side (2006)

Live is the first live video album by American nu metal band Korn, released on double-DVD format on November 19, 2002. Directed by Jim Gable, it was recorded at the Hammerstein Ballroom at Manhattan Center Studios during the band's 2002 Untouchables tour. It features tracks from their self-titled album, Life Is Peachy, Follow the Leader, Issues, and Untouchables, as well as part of their cover of Metallica's "One" that was later performed for 2003 Metallica's "MTV Icon" special in its entirety. The second DVD features the same show, but from alternate angles, as well as some behind-the-scenes material. Live has been certified Gold by the RIAA.

== Set list ==
1. Preshow/Opening (0:33)
2. "Here to Stay" (from Untouchables) (4:14)
3. "Twist" (from Life Is Peachy) (0:48)
4. "A.D.I.D.A.S." (from Life Is Peachy) (2:18)
5. "Trash" (from Issues) (3:21)
6. "Blind" (from Korn) (3:58)
7. "Embrace" (from Untouchables) (4:38)
8. "Faget" (from Korn) (5:37)
9. "Falling Away from Me" (from Issues) (4:24)
10. "Blame" (from Untouchables) (3:38)
11. "Make Me Bad" (from Issues) / "One" (Metallica cover) / "Justin" (from Follow the Leader) (4:07)
12. "Freak on a Leash" (from Follow the Leader) (4:13)
13. "Somebody Someone" (from Issues) (3:45)
14. "Thoughtless" (from Untouchables) (4:22)
15. "Shoots and Ladders" (from Korn) (4:01)
16. "Got the Life" (from Follow the Leader) (3:46)
17. Credits ("No One's There") (1:41)

== See also ==
- Korn video albums
