= Who Then Now? =

Video by Korn
- Released: 18 March 1997; 14 July 2009 (DVD)
- Recorded: 1994–1996
- Genre: Nu metal
- Label: Sony, Epic
- Director: McG

Korn chronology
Who Then Now? (1997)	Deuce (2002)

Who Then Now? is a biographical video released by American nu metal band Korn on March 18, 1997. It was certified platinum in the United States by the RIAA on May 5, 1999.

== History ==
It features interviews with the band up to the recording of Life Is Peachy, plus music videos for "Blind", "Shoots and Ladders", "Clown", and "Faget".

The original VHS is out of production, but it can be found in its entirety on the follow-up release, Deuce, which effectively picks up where Who Then Now? left off and follows the band up to the recording of Untouchables.

== Re-release ==
Korn re-released Who Then Now? in its entirety on DVD on 14 July 2009. It does not include any new extra features.

== See also ==
- Korn video albums
