= Live at Montreux 2004 =

Video by Korn
- Released: May 13, 2008
- Recorded: July 5, 2004
- Genre: Nu metal; alternative metal
- Length: 75:00
- Label: Eagle Vision

Korn chronology
Live on the Other Side (2006)	Live at Montreux 2004 (2008)

Live at Montreux 2004 is the third live video album by American nu metal band Korn, released on 13 May 2008. It was recorded at the Montreux Jazz Festival on 5 July 2004. The live album was the last Korn release with their original lineup before guitarist Brian "Head" Welch left the band in February the following year, until his return in 2013. Live at Montreux 2004 was released on Blu-ray in Europe on 30 June 2008, and the day after that in the US.

== Track listing ==
The album features sixteen live tracks in total, filmed on 5 July 2004 in Montreux, Switzerland.

1. "Right Now"
2. "Break Some Off"
3. "Got the Life"
4. "Here to Stay"
5. "Falling Away from Me"
6. "Blind"
7. "Shoots and Ladders"
8. "One"
9. "Freak on a Leash"
10. "A.D.I.D.A.S."
11. "Dead Bodies Everywhere"
12. "Did My Time"
13. "Another Brick in the Wall"
14. "Faget"
15. "Somebody Someone"
16. "Y'All Want a Single"

== See also ==
- Korn video albums
