= Neidermayer's Mind =

Demo album by Korn
- Released: October 17, 1993
- Recorded: 1993
- Studio: Underground Chicken Sound Studios
- Length: 17:55
- Producer: Ross Robinson

Korn chronology
| Neidermayer's Mind (1993) | Korn (1994) |

Neidermayer's Mind is a demo tape by American nu metal band Korn. It was released in October 1993, and was produced by Ross Robinson. The demo is a rarity, but finished versions of the songs appeared on subsequent Korn albums. Three of the tracks ("Blind", "Daddy", and "Predictable") appeared on their self-titled debut album (1994), while "Alive" was reworked and later featured on Take a Look in the Mirror (2003).

== Background ==
Before Korn even developed a name, they had moved into a small house together in Huntington Beach, California, south of Los Angeles, where they began working on songs. Later, they rented a studio from Jeff Creath, the same person who let lead singer Jonathan Davis live in his garage. The studio was called "Underground Chicken Sound". While they were recording at Underground Chicken Sound, a group of people had been loitering around outside the studio. The band began playing a prelude to a later song, "Clown". When they began playing the song's riffs, a larger crowd gathered around, liking Korn's sound. Bassist Reginald "Fieldy" Arvizu said it was because it sounded so "different".

The band name is derived from a shared memory of a sexual story told at a party, about two homosexual men felching and a corn kernel. Davis remarks that the word "Corn" was an inside joke between the guests of the party. He introduced it to the group and told the story, which they liked, but their manager initially rejected it. To convince him, the band decided that they would either be named "Corn" or be named "Larry", after said manager. After neither parties budged, Korn came to be. Shaffer had the idea to spell the name with both a "K" instead of a "C", and Fieldy came up with writing it with a backwards "R" so the band's logo would look like a child's drawing. The logo was designed by lead vocalist Jonathan Davis with his left hand, officially labeling them "KoЯn". Silveria explained, "the music makes the name, because Korn's a dumb name. But once we get established, it makes the name cool."

The demo's title refers to the artist Neidermayer, who drew the cassette's cover. Although it was released without a proper title, the demo eventually became known as "Neidermayer's Mind" by fans and collectors.

== Music and structure ==
The demo version of "Daddy" is shorter in length (4:29) than the album version (9:35). The demo does not feature the a cappella intro; it starts immediately with Fieldy's bass riff. It also has a different chorus. After the instrumental bridge, there is an extra part to the song with Jonathan Davis singing: "Mommy! Why did Daddy touch me there?" which leads into "I didn't touch you there." Unlike the official version of the song, "Daddy" was played live on three occasions. The demo version of "Blind" has a noticeably shorter bridge and many other changes. "Pradictable" [sic] has a slightly higher key than the version featured on their debut album. The songs "Blind" and "Daddy" appeared in Sexart before they were re-recorded with Korn. "Daddy" was originally titled "Follow Me".

"Alive" was scrapped with several of its sections reworked into the song "Need To", from the band's first album. A proper reworking of "Alive" appeared on Korn's sixth album Take a Look in the Mirror, over a decade after the demo. With this demo, Korn created and pioneered the nu metal sound, riffs, and rhythm. A key component of their sound was the use of seven-string guitars.

== Reception ==
Neidermayer's Mind had a limited printing, and was not well received. It was released to record companies and to people who filled out a flyer given out at gigs they played for free with Biohazard and House of Pain.

== Track listing ==
| No. | Title | Writer(s) | Length |
|---|---|---|---|
| 1. | "Pradictable" (sic) | Korn | 4:27 |
| 2. | "Blind" | Sexart, Korn | 4:52 |
| 3. | "Daddy" | Sexart, Korn | 4:29 |
| 4. | "Alive" | Korn | 4:07 |
| Total length: | | | 17:55 |

== Credits ==
Korn

- Jonathan Davis – lead vocals
- Head – guitar, backing vocals
- J. "Munky" Shaffer – guitar
- Fieldy – bass
- David Silveria – drums

Production

- Ross Robinson – producer, mixing, A&R
- Jeff Creath – mastering, co-producer
- Larry Weintraub – management
