= Behind the Player: Munky =

Behind The Player: Munky

Video by Munky
- Released: November 1, 2008
- Length: 72:00
- Label: IMV
- Director: Dean Karr
- Producer: Ken Mayer & Sean E DeMott

Behind The Player: Munky is an Interactive Music Video featuring Korn guitarist Munky. Released on November 1, 2008 by IMV, the DVD features Munky giving in-depth guitar lessons for how to play "Blind" and "Falling Away from Me" by Korn and an intimate behind-the scenes look at his life as a professional musician, including rare photos and video. The DVD also includes Munky jamming the two tracks with Korn drummer Ray Luzier, VideoTab that shows exactly how Munky plays his parts in the two songs, as well as other bonus material.

IMV donates $.25 from the sale of each Behind the Player DVD to Little Kids Rock, an organization that gets instruments in the hands of underprivileged kids.

== Contents ==
Behind The Player

Munky talks about his background, influences and gear, including rare photos and video

"Blind" by Korn

- Lesson: Munky gives an in-depth guitar lesson for how to play the song
- Jam: Munky jams the track with Korn drummer Ray Luzier
- VideoTab: Animated tablature shows exactly how Munky plays the track, with both 6- and 7-string versions

"Falling Away from Me" by Korn

- Lesson: Munky gives an in-depth guitar lesson for how to play the song
- Jam: Munky jams the track with Korn drummer Ray Luzier
- VideoTab: Animated tablature shows exactly how Munky plays the track, with both 6- and 7-string versions

Special features

- Bonus Video Clip
- Photo Album
- Little Kids Rock promotional video

== Personnel ==
- Produced By: Ken Mayer & Sean E Demott
- Directed By: Dean Karr
- Producer: Leon Melas
- Executive Producer: Rick Donaleshen
- Associate Producer: Jamie Tiessere
- Director Of Photography: Ken Barrows
- Sound Engineer: Tim Harkins
- Edited By: Jeff Morose
- Mixed By: Matt Chidgy & Cedrick Courtois
- Graphics By: Thayer Demay
- Transcription By: Thayer DeMay
- Camera Operators: Chris Shaw, Mike Chateneuf, Kieth Mcnulty, Doug Cragoe
- Gaffer: John Parker
- Technical Director: Tyler Bourns
- Assistant Director: Matt Pick
- Production Assistant: Laine Proctor
- Lighting And Grip: Mcnulty Nielson
- Artist Hospitality: Sasha Mayer
- Shot At: Korn Studios
- Special Guest: Ray Luzier
- Cover Photo By: Sébastien Paquet
- Video Courtesy Of: Danny “Hamcam” Hamilton, Sébastien Paquet, Korn Partnership Llc
- Photos Courtesy Of: Neil Zlozower, Sébastien Paquet, James Shaffer, Reggie Arvizu, Dina Arvizu, Roxanne Robinson
