= Need To (Korn song) =

Single by Korn

from the album Korn
- Released: April 1995
- Recorded: 1994
- Studio: Indigo Ranch Studios, Malibu, California
- Genre: Nu metal
- Length: 4:01
- Label: Epic; Immortal
- Songwriters: Reginald Arvizu; Jonathan Davis; James Shaffer; David Silveria; Brian Welch
- Producer: Ross Robinson

Korn singles chronology
"Blind" (1994)	"Need To" (1995)	"Shoots and Ladders" (1995)

"Need To" is a song written and recorded by the American nu metal band Korn for their self-titled debut album. It was released as the album's second single in April 1995.

== Music and structure ==
The song features elements of an older Korn song called "Alive", which was found on their demo tape, Neidermayer's Mind. "Alive" was eventually reworked and re-recorded for the band's sixth studio album, Take a Look in the Mirror.

== Concept ==
"Need To" is about being in a relationship with someone you love so much but you are too scared to get close to them because you're paranoid that they may stop loving you.

You pull me closer, I push you away,
You tell me it's okay, I can't help but feel the pain.

I was used to being used by people I loved and any future relationship was going to feel the same. Every time I thought I was getting too close, I would push her away." – Jonathan Davis

In 2015, Jonathan Davis disclosed that the song's subject was Aimee Echo of Human Waste Project. "We were really good friends back in the day, and we never hooked up, and never did anything, but the vibe was there. I don’t think I ever told her this, but I guess she’s going to find out now…”

== Credits ==
- Jonathan Davis - vocals
- Munky - rhythm guitar
- Head - lead guitar
- Fieldy - bass
- David Silveria - drums
- Produced by Ross Robinson
- Eddy Schreyer – mastering
- Stephen Stickler – photography
- Jay Papke/Dante Ariola – art direction and design
- Chuck Johnson – engineering and mixing

== Track listing ==
=== US Radio Promo ===
- CD5" ESK 6981
1. "Need To" – 4:02
