= Daddy (Korn song) =

Song by Korn

from the album Korn
- Recorded: 1994
- Genre: Nu metal
- Length: 9:32; 17:31 (with silence and hidden track)
- Label: Immortal; Epic
- Songwriters: Jonathan Davis; Dennis Shinn; Reginald Arvizu; James Shaffer; David Silveria; Brian Welch
- Producer: Ross Robinson

"Daddy" is a song recorded and performed by American nu metal band Korn for their first album Korn (1994).

== Concept ==
Jonathan Davis has stated that the song is about a painful and tragic experience of being molested as a child and not being believed. However, he denied it was about physical or sexual abuse at the hands of his father, and the title and some concepts within the song stem from his parents not believing him. The song caused many to assume that Jonathan's father Rick Davis had molested his son. It is a source of embarrassment for Rick, though his son has gone on the record in many interviews saying it was actually written about a family friend. Jonathan and Rick both decided not to say who the person was.

In an early Kerrang! magazine interview, Davis commented on the song:

"When I was a kid, I was being abused by somebody else and I went to my parents and told them about it, and they thought I was lying and joking around. They never did shit about it. They didn't believe it was happening to their son.... I don't really like to talk about that song. This is as much as I've ever talked about it...."

In an interview with Rolling Stone, Davis stated that he was comfortable performing the song when it was played as part of the album's 20th anniversary. However, in a 2022 interview with Metal Hammer, Davis said that he felt he owed it to the fans to play the song during said tour, and that he doesn't want to perform it again. Davis has also uploaded a video discussing the song to YouTube. In the video he said that the abuser, who by this point was deceased, had been his babysitter.

== Music and structure ==
The song eventually leads to Davis being stranded in a room and shouting hostile things, presumably to the abuser, which then leads to Davis weeping for a long period of time as a lullaby by vocalist Judith Kiener is heard. The band continues playing an instrumental version until eventually a door is heard shutting. These were all additions by producer Ross Robinson, who did not tell Davis that he was still being recorded and instructed his bandmates not to stop; Kiener's part was a home recording taken at Robinson's request. The rest of the band did not know the song was about Davis' childhood before recording.

After about five minutes of silence at the end of the song, a discussion can be heard; an audio clip that Robinson found inside an abandoned house. The argument revolves around a man named Michael and his wife Geri discussing the installation of a car part (apparently an exhaust manifold on a Dodge Dart). Michael can be heard verbally abusing Geri over the merits of the installation. This hidden track is called "Michael & Geri".

== Live performance ==
The song is notable for its popularity among fans. However, it was rarely played live after the album version was recorded; an earlier version of the song was performed at a few of their first shows. Jonathan Davis says that the song is simply too personal for him to perform live.

"He's already emotionally drained when he leaves the stage after our set, so I couldn't imagine him leaving the stage after playing that song." – Munky

"I don't play that song live because it's just magic," Davis said. "If I play that song over and over every night, it'd lose its meaning. I don't want people to expect me to freak out like I did on that. That was what happened in that point in time, and that magic was captured, and I don't want to fuck with it."

Korn announced they were going to play their self-titled album in full on tours to celebrate the 20th anniversary of the album, including playing "Daddy"; however, the band later stated they will only be playing their debut album in full at festivals, hence not playing "Daddy" on the Prepare for Hell tour with Slipknot and King 810. Though they have performed it live multiple times.

== Legacy ==
The song remains popular with fans, often ranked highly among other Korn songs. It is considered by many to be one of the most disturbing songs ever released, and is often cited as such on various polls and lists.
