= Clown (Korn song) =

Single by Korn

from the album Korn
- Released: July 12, 1995
- Studio: Indigo Ranch (Malibu, California)
- Genre: Nu metal
- Length: 4:36 (album version); 3:38 (radio edit)
- Label: Epic; Immortal
- Songwriters: Reginald Arvizu; Jonathan Davis; James Shaffer; David Silveria; Brian Welch
- Producer: Ross Robinson

Korn singles chronology
"Shoots and Ladders" (1995)	"Clown" (1995)	"No Place to Hide" (1996)

Music video
- "Clown" on YouTube

"Clown" is a song by the American nu metal band Korn. It was released as the fourth single from their self-titled debut album on July 12, 1995.

== Meaning ==
What inspired Jonathan Davis to write this song was an early gig in San Diego where a person in the audience was booing them and telling them to "go back to Bakersfield!" Jonathan knelt down to hear him and the guy took a swing at him. He missed and the band's manager assaulted him. The person was all tattooed and looked like a "clown" to Jonathan Davis, inspiring the title of the song and also the line "Hit me clown, because I'm not from your town." Preceding the song is a conversation with Korn fooling around at the song's recording, and in the conversation, one of the members says "I wish we could put 'Twist' on a fucking tape"; this references a track that would eventually appear on the band's next album Life Is Peachy. A quote taken from Korn's Who Then Now? video, which serves as an introduction for the music video:

I wrote a song about a guy in San Diego who took a swing at me. He's all "Fuck you! Go back to Bakersfield!" Well I didn't understand that, so I bent down and he tried to swing at me, and our road manager Jeff knocked his ass out, that song is Clown.

== Music video ==
The video begins with the band walking in a hallway in El Segundo High School. There are shots of a clown balancing something on his nose. Soon, the band starts playing in a locker room which appears to be happening at night. Jonathan Davis is seen singing and, in some clips, he's sitting in a locker room inside one of the dry showers. With a few people spraying a little bit of water on his hair to tease him. This represents some of his painful experiences in high school of being teased. It also features the band in a gym with clips of jocks in their football jerseys and cheerleaders seen by someone in the halls. One of the cheerleaders goes into a bathroom and starts smiling in the dark room. She proceeds to brush her hair with her hands. Clips also show the band performing in a dark room. The video ends with the cheerleader in the bathroom taking off her shirt, showing a tattoo on her back which is the band's logo. The music video most likely could be them in the school after a football game at night. The music video was directed by McG; and produced by Dana Shaffer at the production house “Sunshine Filmworks” in Hollywood. It first aired in April 1996, and by May it was in the top 50 rotation on MTV.

== Track listing ==
=== US Radio Promo ===
- CD5" ESK 6580
1. "Clown" – 4:36

Note: the back cover does not state which version this is. However, it's identical to the Radio Edit on the below European promo.

=== European Radio Promo ===
- CD5" ESK 7735
1. "Clown" (Radio Edit) – 3:52
