= Faget (song) =

Song by Korn

from the album Korn
- Released: October 11, 1994 (Korn album release)
- Recorded: 1994, Indigo Ranch Studios, Malibu, California, U.S.
- Genre: Nu metal
- Length: 5:49
- Label: Immortal, Epic
- Songwriter: Jonathan Davis
- Producer: Ross Robinson

"Faget" is a song by the American nu metal band Korn, from the band's debut album Korn. The song is about how Korn's lead vocalist, Jonathan Davis, was bullied in high school for being into arts, wearing eyeliner, being into new wave music, and wearing frilly shirts. According to Jonathan Davis, he was constantly called names such as "faggot".

== Background, music and writing ==
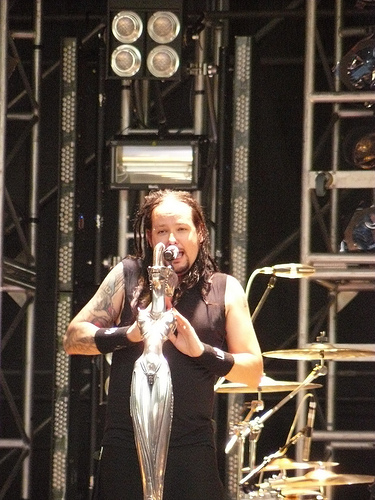
After his high school years, Davis (pictured) stopped wearing eyeliner and frilly shirts and started to wear baggy Adidas clothes and long hair.

"Faget" is about Korn's lead vocalist Jonathan Davis' time in high school where he was relentlessly teased and harassed by jocks for being into arts, wearing frilly shirts, being into new wave music (for example, Duran Duran) and wearing eyeliner. Many people assumed that Davis was gay and would call him names such as "faggot". Davis said:

"There's a big rumor about me being a homosexual. I was in the New Romantic scene [in high school] with Duran Duran [as his favorite band], wearing makeup. I got called a fag by the jocks. Couldn't walk through the halls without hearing that or being picked on".

"Faget" features an example of Korn's guitarists (James "Munky" Shaffer and Brian "Head" Welch) utilizing what they have dubbed the "Mr. Bungle chord". When speaking about the recording of "Faget", Welch said: "[Jonathan] moved in with us, with his girlfriend, and I remember sitting in the room he rented. I had my guitar in there and I wrote the riff. We just came up with the song "Faget" right then and there. It was the very beginning". Songfacts described "Faget" as "a very emotional and genuine song where Davis lashes out at his tormentors".

== Personnel ==
Main personnel

- Jonathan Davis – vocals
- James "Munky" Shaffer – guitar
- Brian "Head" Welch – guitar, additional vocals
- Reginald "Fieldy" Arvizu – bass
- David Silveria – drums

Additional personnel

- Ross Robinson – production
- Eddy Schreyer – mastering
- Stephen Stickler – photography
- Jay Papke, Dante Ariola – art direction and design
- Chuck Johnson – engineering, mixing

== Bibliography ==
- McIver, Joel (2002). "How did we get to nu-metal from old metal?". Nu-metal: The Next Generation of Rock & Punk. Omnibus Press. pp. 10, 12. ISBN 0-7119-9209-6.
