= Blind (Korn song) =

Single by Korn

from the album Korn
- Released: 1994 (album)
- Studio: Indigo Ranch Studios (Malibu, California)
- Genre: Nu metal
- Length: 4:19
- Label: Immortal; Epic
- Songwriters: Dennis Shinn; Ryan Shuck; Jonathan Davis; Reginald Arvizu; James Shaffer; David Silveria; Brian Welch
- Producer: Ross Robinson

Korn singles chronology
"Christmas Song" (1993)	"Blind" (1994)	"Need To" (1995)

Music video
- "Blind" on YouTube

"Blind" is a song by American nu metal band Korn for their self-titled debut album. It was released as the album's first single in August 1994.

In 2021, Eli Enis of Revolver included the song in his list of the "15 Greatest Album-Opening Songs in Metal".

== Music and structure ==
"Blind" had been written while Jonathan Davis was in Sexart before he left the band to join Korn.

Korn's contribution came once they re-recorded the song for their debut album LP 1994. Even though the song was completed by Sexart, Korn added an extended song intro (which is a faster interpolation of the drum intro to "Too Many Puppies" by Primus), utilizing drum cymbals, and added a small bass line. Their addition acted as an intro that led into the original intro composed by Sexart. Also, Korn applied a small musical change away from Sexart's version, which landed under the vocal chorus "I'm so blind" lyric, a change that did not occur until the Korn LP was recorded. SexArt's original music piece was present on Korn's demo Neidermayer's Mind 1993. Korn also tailored the song ending, being the bass coda at the end of the song quotes Cypress Hill's song "Lick a Shot". The ending, technically, had nothing to do with the actual song itself. Davis and Korn utilized this song on the album without crediting the original songwriters Dennis Shinn and Ryan Shuck. However, both Shinn and Shuck were later credited on the Greatest Hits Vol.1 compilation album.

The song is dubbed by many to be "the birth of nu-metal".

== Track listing ==
=== US Enhanced Radio Promo CD ===
- CD5" ESK 6786
1. "Blind" – 4:18
2. "Blind" (video) - 4:18

=== UK Single ===
- 10" KORN1

Side A:

1. "Blind" – 4:18

Side B:

1. "Fake (Album Version) - 4:51
2. "Sean Olson (Radio Edit) - 4:45

=== Australian Radio Promo ===
- CD5" SAMP 3165
1. "Blind" – 4:18

== Appearances ==
- RIAA Certifications: Reflect USA Sales, through Nielsen SoundScan.

KORN: "Korn (self titled)" Korn RIAA Certified 2X's Platinum (Korn "Self Titled" sold over 10 million worldwide.)

Street Fighter II: The Animated Movie: English Soundtrack

KORN: "Who Then Now?" (video) RIAA Certified 2X's Platinum / KORN: "Deuce (video album)" (DVD) 1X's Platinum

Family Values Tour '98 (album): Family Values Tour '98 (DVD) (DVD) RIAA Certified 3X's Platinum

Woodstock 1999 (album): (video RIAA Certified 2X's Platinum / cd - Gold)

KORN: Deuce (video album) RIAA Certified Platinum

KORN: "Live at Hammerstein" Live (Korn DVD) RIAA Certified Gold

KORN: "Live on the Other Side" (DVD) RIAA Certified 1X's Platinum

KORN: "Live & Rare (Korn album)" - (DVD) RIAA Certified 1X's Platinum

Family Values Tour 2006: - (DVD) RIAA Certified 1X's Platinum

KORN: "Greatest Hits, Vol. 1 (Korn album)" 2004 RIAA Certified 1X's Platinum

KORN: "MTV Unplugged (Korn album) 2007 DVD - RIAA Certified 1X's Platinum

NHL 2K8 2007: (Gameplay soundtrack)

KORN: The Family Values Tour 2007 dvd/cd documented but unreleased

Madden NFL 10: (Gameplay soundtrack)

KORN III: Korn III: Remember Who You Are Special Edition iTunes (BLIND - live ) 2010

KORN: The Path of Totality Tour – Live at the Hollywood Palladium (cd/DVD) 2012

KORN: Family Values Festival 2013 - dvd

== Release and reception ==
The song was released as a promotional single in the United States, Canada and Australia, and as a limited edition 10" vinyl single in the United Kingdom. It charted on the Canadian alternative chart, the RPM Alternative 30, in November 1995, peaking at number 15.

"Blind" is widely considered to be one of the band's best songs. In 2019, Loudwire ranked the song number three on their list of the 50 greatest Korn songs, and in 2021, Kerrang ranked the song number one on their list of the 20 greatest Korn songs. In March 2023, Rolling Stone ranked "Blind" at number 67 on their "100 Greatest Heavy Metal Songs of All Time" list.

On March 28, 2026, San Diego Padres pitcher Mason Miller first used "Blind" as his walk-out song, earning a save and the first win of the Padres' season over the Detroit Tigers.

=== Chart performance ===
Chart (1995)	Peak position
Canada Alternative 30 (RPM)	15
US Alternative Top 50 (Radio & Records)	49

== Live performance ==
"Blind" is a signature song of Korn as well as a fan favorite song. It's usually performed as their concert opener or show closer.

After departing from Korn in 2005, guitarist Brian "Head" Welch had also covered the song live

Davis invited Brian "Head" Welch to join Korn on stage and perform the song in Carolina Rebellion in Rockingham, North Carolina, This was Welch's first performance with Korn since his departure. Since then, Welch had rejoined Korn.

Recently, at shows such as the Download Festival, the song has opened the show as a new mix, with a much shorter intro.

Korn played their first 20th Anniversary concert in March 2015, marking the first time several songs off their debut 1994 self-titled "Korn" LP had been performed live in years, including "Daddy," "Predictable" and "Shoots and Ladders."

== Music video ==
The music video was directed by Joseph McGinty Nichol, who was a friend of the band's discoverer Paul Pontius, and financed the production out of his own pocket. Korn is seen performing in front of an energetic crowd in a small stage room. A large "Korn" flag can be seen on the back of the stage. There are also clips of the band hanging out. The video was released in January 1995.

== Demo version ==
The first version of this song had been recorded on the band's demo tape entitled Neidermeyer's Mind, released in 1993. There is a slight difference between these versions, as the primal version had a more heavy-metal atmosphere, and the version that appeared on band's debut album featured a hip-hop stylized bridge.

== Accolades ==
=== Kerrang! ===
December 14, 2002

- 666 Songs You Must Own (contemporary metal) Top 20: No. 2
- 100 Greatest Singles Of All Time - No. 10
- The 50 Best Album Openers In Metal - No. 8
- The Kerrang! 100 Albums You Must Hear Before You Die: No. 18 - Korn, Korn

=== Q magazine ===
- January 2003 - "100 Songs That Changed The World" - No. 88
- March 2005 - "100 Greatest Guitar Tracks Ever!" - No. 93

=== Loudwire ===
- 10 Best Korn Songs - No. 2
- 10 Best Metal Riffs of the 90's - No.7
- Best Korn Album - Readers Poll: No. 1: Korn Featuring the "Fan Favorite" Hit Song, "Blind"
