= Korn (album) =

Studio album by Korn
- Released: October 11, 1994
- Recorded: May–June 1994
- Studio: Indigo Ranch Studios (Malibu, California)
- Genres: Nu metal; alternative metal
- Length: 65:45
- Labels: Immortal; Epic
- Producer: Ross Robinson

Korn chronology
Neidermayer's Mind (1993)	Korn (1994)	Life Is Peachy (1996)

Singles from Korn
- 1. "Blind" Released: August 1, 1994; 2. "Need To" Released: April 8, 1995; 3. "Shoots and Ladders" Released: June 30, 1995; 4. "Clown" Released: July 12, 1995

Korn (printed and stylized as KoЯn) is the debut studio album by the American nu metal band Korn. It was released on October 11, 1994, through Immortal and Epic Records. Before recording the album, the band was approached by Immortal/Epic Records after a performance in Huntington Beach, California. The band signed to their label because they did not want to "sign away all of their creative freedom".

The band would record at Indigo Ranch Studios in Malibu, California, with producer Ross Robinson, who also produced their 1993 demo Neidermayer's Mind. The recording took place from May to June 1994. After the recordings, Korn toured with Biohazard and House of Pain. The album's themes include child abuse, drug abuse, and bullying. Photography was done by Stephen Stickler, and the design was directed by Jay Papke and Dante Ariola.

The album's first single, "Blind", charted at number 15 on the Canadian Alternative 30, and the album peaked at number 10 in New Zealand as well as number 72 on the Billboard 200. The album had sold at least 2.1 million copies in the United States by 2003. Many consider the album to have started the nu metal genre. Korn toured with many bands to promote the album. Initially, Korn joined the Sick of It All Tour. Following the Sick of It All Tour, Korn joined the Danzig 4 Tour. Korn also toured with Megadeth, Fear Factory, and Flotsam and Jetsam.

== Background ==
Before Korn came up with their name, they had moved into a small house together in Huntington Beach, California, south of Los Angeles, where they began working on songs. Soon after moving, they rented Underground Chicken Sounds, a recording studio, from Jeff Creath, who had previously allowed lead singer Jonathan Davis to live in his garage. While they were recording at the studio, they attracted a crowd of people when performing the prelude to "Clown". The band's bass guitarist, Reginald "Fieldy" Arvizu, said that the crowd gathered because the band's style sounded so "different". Korn was formed in 1993. Within two weeks of their establishment, they recorded a demo containing "Blind", "Predictable", and "Daddy". A couple of weeks later, Korn played their first-ever show at a club called California Dreams in Anaheim. Korn began playing gigs in the summer of 1993. While performing at Huntington Beach, the band was spotted by Immortal/Epic A&R Paul Pontius. He approached the band offering to record an album through their company. Although the group had offers from several other labels, Korn went with Immortal/Epic because they did not want to "sign away all of their creative freedom".

== Recording and production ==
"Once we started playing, there was a complete sense of concentration among all of us. It was truly the only time we were all focused. I think that the synchronicity comes through in the sound. Once we were ready to record, we'd go into the studio where [James Shaffer] and [Brian Welch] would come up with a heavy guitar riff while I'd lay down a bass line over it, and before we knew it, a song would start."

— Reginald "Fieldy" Arvizu

While Korn was looking for a place to record their debut album, they asked producer Ross Robinson to produce their album. After accepting the offer, Robinson suggested they record at Indigo Ranch, Malibu, California. The band would record the majority of the album there, while additional recording took place at Bakersfield's Fat Tracks. Korn recorded most of the album with all members playing simultaneously, as opposed to recording instruments separately. In addition, Indigo Ranch was located on a hill rather than in the city, allowing them to record outside, resulting in the "distinctive" sound and quality of music given off by their instruments. The banging sound near the ending of "Ball Tongue" was created via a guitar cord striking a music stand. The bagpipes on "Shoots and Ladders" are often thought to have been recorded on a mountain-top. However, they were actually recorded with a microphone set up at the back door of the studio while Jonathan Davis walked past outside playing. As he walked further from the microphone, this led to the sound naturally fading quieter. Davis said that "Daddy" features him singing the song alone in the dark without knowing that his vocals were being recorded. Korn finished recording the album by the end of June 1994.

As Robinson produced the album, his career was launched by its success, as it "taught Robinson how to produce." In an interview with the heavy metal magazine Metal Hammer, Davis touted Robinson's behavior, saying: "Ross is a very pure and clean-spirited person, and you feel it when you're with him. He's the kind of person that can draw that out of you. I felt very safe with Ross." The album was released on October 11, 1994, through Immortal and Epic Records. During the recording of Korn, there were four outtakes: "Christmas Song", "Sean Olson", "Layla", and "This Broken Soul". "Sean Olson" was put on the single release of "Shoots and Ladders", and featured on The Crow: City of Angels soundtrack. In 2015, Davis ranked the 1994 debut album as his favorite Korn album.

== Composition and lyrics ==
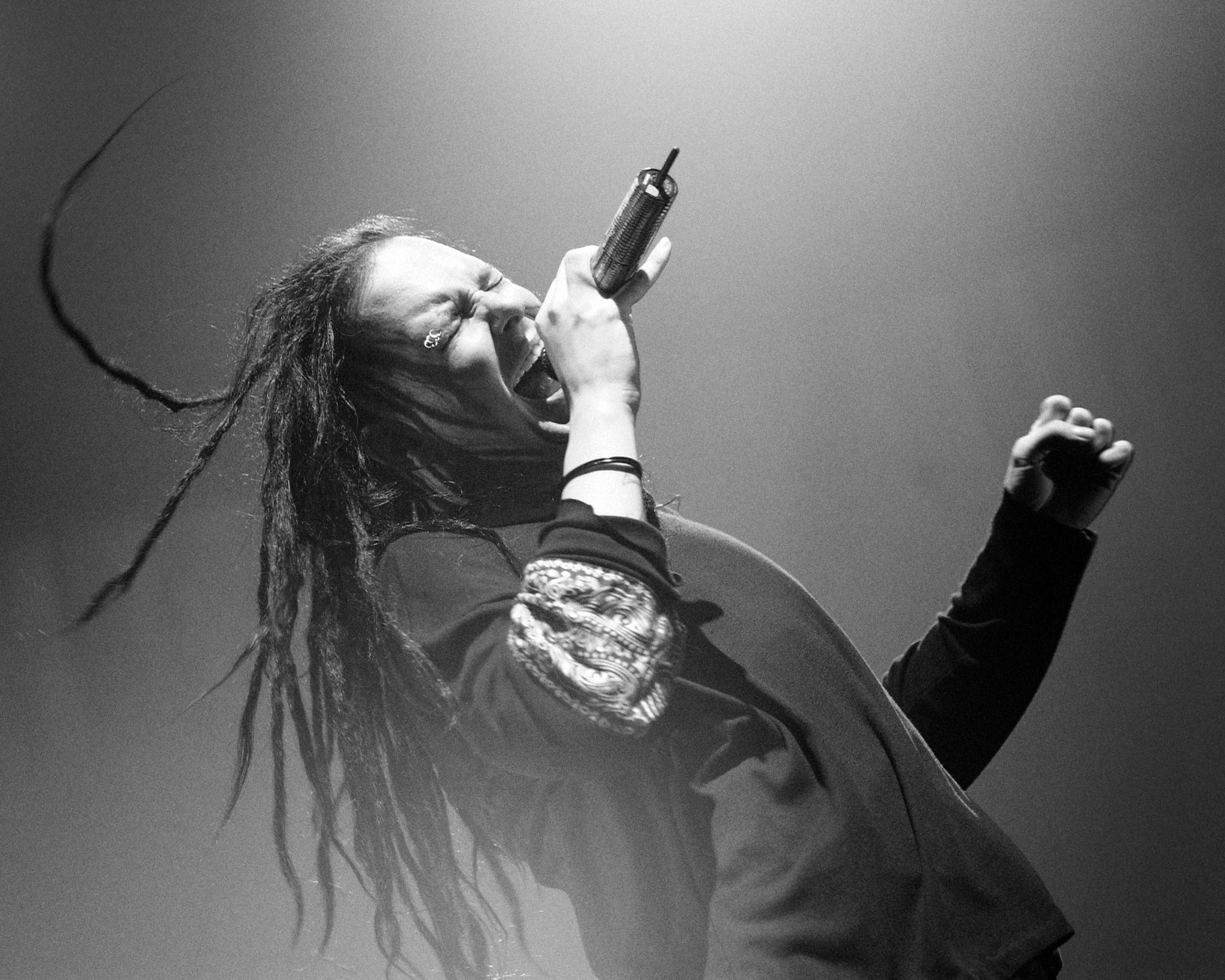
Most of Korn lyrics are based on Jonathan Davis' (pictured in 2002) experiences with child abuse, bullying and drug abuse

Often described as the first nu metal album, but also as alternative metal, Korn uses vocal stylings, fashion and rhythmic elements from hip-hop, as well as heavy sounds from extreme metal. The album begins with "Blind", starting with the dueling riffs of James Shaffer and Brian Welch. Lead vocalist Jonathan Davis' first line is "Are you ready?!", which has become one of the band's trademarks. Davis told Metal Hammer that on the album's second track, "Ball Tongue", he "didn't sing a goddamn word in that song. I couldn't describe what I wanted to do, so that's how it came out. It's a really heavy sound." "Clown"'s concept deals with an incident that happened in San Diego, California. A skinhead who told Davis to "go back to Bakersfield" attempted to hit Davis but he dodged, and the band's road manager, Jeff, knocked the skinhead out. According to Davis and Brian Welch, current Metallica and then-Suicidal Tendencies bassist Robert Trujillo helped them write the song "Divine." "Faget"'s lyrical themes are about Davis' time in high school where he was relentlessly bullied primarily by jocks for wearing eyeliner, listening to new wave and enjoying the arts. He was constantly called names like "fag" or "faggot". Davis talked about the song in an interview saying,

There's a big rumor about me being a homosexual. Does it really matter? I have lots of gay friends. It shouldn't matter. I was in the New Romantic scene [in high school] with Duran Duran [as his favorite band], wearing makeup. I got called a fag by the jocks. Couldn't walk through the halls without hearing that or being picked on.

"Shoots and Ladders", according to Davis, "uncovers the hidden messages in nursery rhymes, the first songs many of us ever hear." He chose each rhyme for a different reason: "'Baa Baa Black Sheep' has racist overtones. 'London Bridge' talks of all the people of London dying (from the Black Plague, as does 'Ring Around the Roses'). Then there's 'Little Red Riding Hood'—one story tells of the wolf raping Red Riding Hood and killing her." The track "Helmet in the Bush" is about addiction to methamphetamine, which the members have confessed to using while crafting the record. Davis explained: "Speed in the morning, I'd have it all lined up for breakfast so when I'd lay down and go to sleep, I'd wake up and just snort and it's like 'Yeah, okay, I'm up.' It was bad. It's like, you do one line and stay up all night, but then you have shit to do the next day so you have to do another line to be able to keep staying up to get that shit done. Eventually you start spinning-out from sleep deprivation. You get hallucinations and shit like that." He also explained that the title of the song is about "when you do meth and you look down at your dick and it's literally a helmet in the bush [laughs]". "Basically it's what happens when you do too much drugs and your girl wanna get with you and you got some man problems down below. Just another reason not to do drugs, children," Munky elaborated.

"Daddy", the album's longest track, saw Davis "descending very real tears." Davis said that the song's concept deals with his childhood, saying "People think 'Daddy' was written because my father abused me, but that's not what the song's about. When I was a kid, I was being abused by someone else. I don't really like to talk about that song." Though the song ends at 9:32, a hidden track which depicts an argument between a man and his wife over a Dodge Dart carburetor can be heard at 14:05 after about 4.5 minutes of silence.

== Marketing and promotion ==
Stephen Stickler acted as the band's photographer, and Jay Papke and Dante Ariola directed the album's cover art and booklet. The cover depicts Paul Pontius' niece in a blue school uniform with a matching bow in her blonde hair, bringing her swing to a stop to squint in the sun at the man standing before her. The man is seen only as a threatening shadow on the ground. The band's logo, a childlike drawing of the band's name created by lead singer Jonathan Davis, is seen on the sandy ground by the man. The back cover of the album shows the playground empty.

After Korn finished recording the album, they went on a club tour of California (which included shows with No Doubt, Testament, Pennywise, and Deftones, among others) before going on tour with Biohazard and House of Pain at free gigs. Korn personally passed out flyers at their performances. Major label Immortal/Epic gave them enough money for their own tour bus. Korn's first gig was in Atlanta, Georgia. About halfway through the tour, the tour bus that their record executives gave them stopped working, forcing the band to find a new one. This first tour proved very unsuccessful in promoting the album. Aside from them touring, Korn released four singles. "Blind" was the lead single, released in 1994, followed by "Need To", "Shoots and Ladders", and "Clown".

Despite this, Korn resumed touring in the Sick of It All Tour, beginning on January 21, 1995, and ending in March 1995. Following the Sick of It All Tour, Korn joined the Danzig 4 Tour, including Danzig and Marilyn Manson. The tour lasted three months and was preceded with the group touring with Megadeth, where they played to crowds of thirty-five-hundred to five thousand. They toured with Megadeth, Fear Factory, and Flotsam and Jetsam. All of this happened in the summer of 1995. Lead vocalist Jonathan Davis introduced the bagpipes while performing live (however many people there did not like this).

Korn began touring in Europe during September 1995. One of the band's first concert dates was in Nottingham. After the performance, there was a conflict between Arvizu and the drum technician, resulting in the airport prohibiting them from boarding the plane. Korn made their London debut on October 27, 1995, performing at LA2 with Paw as the opening act. At the end of that same month, the band also made their Paris debut playing in a small club, L'Arapaho. Korn received positive praise from the European press because of their "ravaging" live performances. By October 1995, Korn had played 200–250 dates in support of their first album. From 1995 to 1996, Korn toured with Sugar Ray, Cradle of Thorns, Life of Agony, and others. Korn and Deftones opened for Ozzy Osbourne in early 1996.

== Critical reception ==
=== Contemporary reviews ===
Contemporary ratings
Review scores
Source	Rating
Kerrang!	4/5 stars
Los Angeles Times	2/4 stars
Rock Hard	7/10
The Village Voice	C−
Vox	6/10

Mike Boem of Los Angeles Times found that if one accepts the style of "thrashing, metallic, incessantly wrathful rock...the debut is a smashing success." while finding that the music may be cathartic for listeners who can identify with Davis's lyrics, the music itself had "no sensible measure of its artistic merit." Boem compared some of the musical tracks as containing elements of scarping jagged guitars similar to that of the Nine Inch Nails album The Downward Spiral but concluded that "as the album goes on, Korn's blasting and hammering becomes more head-on, the results less distinctive." In his 1995 review, Jason Arnopp of Kerrang! wrote that Davis' "voice overflows with cracked, frustrated emotion, often lapsing into uncontrollable screams like a mental ward". He described how Korn have "injected their own special insanity into the music, crafting a horribly sleazy sound that matches their bleak outlook on life". He noted that the "general aggression" of the album could delight fans of Prong, Pantera, and Rage Against the Machine. Arnopp rated Korn 4 out of 5 and mentioned the "band's cult stature" a year after the album's release. In 1996, music journalist Manuel Rabasse described Korn as "an almost dadaist record – little or no melody, structures cut out in spite of common sense, guitars deliberately out of tune – with, to top it all off, a hysterical vocalist playing the bagpipes" and said Korn was "a group of crazies". Rabasse found the album "marks the awakening of a metal-hardcore a little too primal".

=== Retrospective reassessment ===
Retrospective ratings
Review scores
Source	Rating
AllMusic	5/5 stars
Blender	4/5 stars
Collector's Guide to Heavy Metal	8/10
The Encyclopedia of Popular Music	4/5 stars
Kerrang!	5/5 stars
The Great Rock Discography	9/10
MusicHound Rock	3/5 stars
Pitchfork	8.6/10
The Rolling Stone Album Guide	2/5 stars
Sputnikmusic	4/5 stars

Stephen Thomas Erlewine of AllMusic gave Korn a positive review, calling the album "a powerful sound and one that actually builds on the funk-metal innovations of the late '80s/early '90s instead of merely replicating them". In a 2002 critical reappraisal, Catherine Yates of Kerrang! gave the album 5 out of 5 rating. She compared it against "the continuing glut of interchangeable metal drones who have appropriated their blueprint for quick sell, lowest common denominator, and it still stands as a monument – unchallenged and unequaled – to the authentic ideals that spawned it". In 2022, Metal Hammer writers wrote that they considered the album to be Korn's best, writing, "this is a record that remains as integral to modern metal as the first Black Sabbath album or Metallica's Master of Puppets". Sputnikmusic thought that although Davis isn't the best lyricist, he is able to paint very disturbing visual images in the head of the listener, especially on the song "Daddy". Sputnikmusic also thought that Davis's voice was what made Korn unique, and that it made every song on the album interesting. They praised each of the members' skill on their respective instrument, and summed it up as "a bass heavy, angst ridden vessel of catharsis". They considered "Blind", "Ball Tongue", "Need To", "Faget", "Helmet in the Bush" and "Daddy" to be the best songs from the album. Arnopp stated that the group "positively encouraged America's formerly introverted, apathetic misfits to thrust a livid middle finger in the face of high–school jocks who would traditionally bundle them into a locker and brand them 'faggots' for sporting hair longer than any Army buzz-cut."

== Commercial performance ==
On January 29, 1996, Korn went gold in the United States, and on February 10, 1996, the album charted at number 72. The album spent 30 weeks on the Recording Industry Association of New Zealand charts, entering on June 23, 1996, and peaking at number 10. The album left the chart on May 18, 1997. It went platinum in the United States on January 8, 1997, and entered the ARIA Charts on March 28, 1999, at number 49. It maintained a position on the chart for five weeks, and peaked at number 46. It peaked at number five on the Top Pop Catalog Albums chart on April 24, 1999. On July 17, 1999, it entered the MegaCharts at its peak position of 56. After three weeks, Korn left the chart. On November 10, 1999, it was certified double-platinum by the Recording Industry Association of America. The album peaked at number 181 on the UK Albums Chart on February 10, 2001. It has been certified platinum by the Australian Recording Industry Association. In 2003, Billboard reported that Korn sold at least 2,100,000 copies in the United States.

== Legacy and influence ==
Korn's debut album is said to have established nu metal. As said by Joel McIver, Korn "was almost solely responsible for the tidal wave of change that subsequently swept the metal scene." Bands like Coal Chamber and Limp Bizkit were inspired by the album's "churning rage, emphasising similar grooves and song structures", and "the sound's hip-hop elements". Slipknot, Machine Head, and Sepultura were also inspired by the album. The album launched the career of record producer Ross Robinson, who later produced albums such as Sepultura's 1996 album Roots, Limp Bizkit's 1997 debut album Three Dollar Bill, Y'all, and Slipknot's first two albums (their 1999 self-titled debut and 2001's Iowa).

In 2014, Rolling Stone described Korn as "the most important metal record of the last 20 years." In July 2014, Guitar World ranked Korn at number 27 in their "Superunknown: 50 Iconic Albums That Defined 1994" list. In 2018, Loudwire named it the greatest nu metal album of all time. In 2017, Rolling Stone listed the album at No. 30 on its list of the 100 Greatest Metal Albums of All Time. In 2021, the staff of Revolver included the album in their list of the "20 Essential Nu-Metal Albums". In 2025, Rae Lemeshow-Barooshian of Loudwire included the album in her list of "the top 50 nu-metal albums of all time", placing it at the top.

Catherine Yates of Kerrang! compared the album's impact to that of Nirvana, stating that Nirvana "provided the soundtrack to the trials of disaffected youth", while Korn's debut album "was the manifestation of disaffected youth itself", summarizing that "Korn itself was the forebear of a musical movement". Metal Hammer highlighted Korn's influence as having spawned "A parade of copycats and bandwagon-hoppers who took the album's sound and remodelled it without an ounce of innovation that Korn possessed".

== Track listing ==
All tracks written by Korn (Jonathan Davis, Brian Welch, James Shaffer, Reginald Arvizu and David Silveria), except where noted.

No.	Title	Writer(s)	Length
1.	"Blind"	Korn, Dennis Shinn, Ryan Shuck	4:19
2.	"Ball Tongue"		4:30
3.	"Need To"		4:02
4.	"Clown"		4:35
5.	"Divine"	Korn, Robert Trujillo	2:52
6.	"Faget"		5:50
7.	"Shoots and Ladders"		5:22
8.	"Predictable"		4:32
9.	"Fake"		4:51
10.	"Lies"		3:22
11.	"Helmet in the Bush"	Davis, Welch, Ross Robinson	4:02
12.	"Daddy" (includes hidden track (Note: "Daddy" ends at 9:32. A hidden track, "Michael & Geri", starts at 14:05, after four minutes and 33 seconds of silence. (however, on some versions of the album "Michael & Geri" is a separate track from "Daddy" and lasts 3:26).))	Korn, Shinn, Shuck	17:31
Total length:			65:45

== Personnel ==
=== Korn ===
- Jonathan Davis – lead vocals, bagpipes on "Shoots and Ladders"
- Brian "Head" Welch – guitar, backing vocals
- James "Munky" Shaffer – guitar
- Reginald "Fieldy" Arvizu – bass
- David Silveria – drums

=== Additional personnel ===
- Judith Kiener – vocals on the lullaby at the end of "Daddy"
- Richard Kaplan – engineering
- Chuck Johnson – engineering, mixing
- Ross Robinson – production, engineering, mixing
- Eddy Schreyer – mastering
- Stephen Stickler – photography
- Jay Papke/Dante Ariola – art direction and design

== Charts ==
=== Weekly charts ===
Chart (1995–2017)	Peak position
Australian Albums (ARIA)	46
Canadian Metal Albums (Nielsen SoundScan)	30
Czech Albums (ČNS IFPI)	57
Dutch Albums (Album Top 100)	56
New Zealand Albums (RMNZ)	10
UK Albums (OCC)	181
US Billboard 200	72
US Top Catalog Albums (Billboard)	5

=== Year-end charts ===
Chart (1996)	Position
New Zealand Albums (RMNZ)	38
US Billboard 200	127
Chart (1999)	Position
Australian Albums (ARIA)	76

== Certifications ==
Region	Certification	Certified units/sales
Australia (ARIA)	Platinum	70,000^{^}
New Zealand (RMNZ)	Platinum	15,000^{^}
United Kingdom (BPI)	Gold	100,000^{*}
United States (RIAA)	2× Platinum	2,000,000^{^}
^{*} Sales figures based on certification alone.^{^} Shipments figures based on certification alone.

== Bibliography ==
- Arvizu, Reginald (2009). Got the Life: My Journey of Addiction, Faith, Recovery, and Korn. William Marrow. ISBN 978-0-06-166249-2.
- Furman, Leah (May 5, 2000). Korn: Life in the Pit. New York: St. Martin's Griffin. ISBN 0-312-25396-6.
- Gulla, Bob (2006). The Greenwood Encyclopedia of Rock History – The Grunge and Post-Grunge Years, 1991–2005. Vol. 6. Connecticut: Greenwood Publishing Group. ISBN 978-0-313-32981-4.
- Paquet, Sebastien (May 1, 2002). Korn de A à Z [Korn from A to Z]. MusicBook guides (in French) (1st ed.). Paris: Prélude et Fugue. ISBN 978-2-843-43101-2.
- Small, Doug (1998). The Story of Korn. Omnibus Press. ISBN 0-8256-1688-3.
