= Shoots and Ladders =

Single by Korn

from the album Korn
- Released: June 30, 1995
- Studio: Indigo Ranch (Malibu, California)
- Genre: Nu metal
- Length: 5:22 (album version); 3:39 (radio edit)
- Label: Epic; Immortal
- Songwriters: Reginald Arvizu; Jonathan Davis; James Shaffer; David Silveria; Brian Welch
- Producer: Ross Robinson

Korn singles chronology
"Need To" (1994)	"Shoots and Ladders" (1995)	"Clown" (1995)

Music video
- "Shoots and Ladders" on YouTube

"Shoots and Ladders" is a song written and recorded by the American nu metal band Korn for their self-titled debut album. It was released as the album's third single in 1995.

== Music and structure ==
The title is a mockery of American children's game Chutes and Ladders (also known in the United Kingdom as Snakes and Ladders), with the song's lyrics mostly consisting of nursery rhymes. It is the first Korn song to feature bagpipes. The song uses the following nursery rhymes in its lyrics:

- "Ring a Ring o' Roses"
- "One, Two, Buckle My Shoe"
- "London Bridge Is Falling Down"
- "Baa, Baa, Black Sheep"
- "This Old Man"
- "Mary Had a Little Lamb"

== Concept ==
"It was written because all these little kids sing these nursery rhymes and they don't know what they originally meant. Everyone is so happy when singing 'Ring Around the Rosie' but it is about the Black Plague. All of them have these evil stories behind them." – Jonathan Davis

== Music video ==
A screenshot from the music video

The video for "Shoots and Ladders" was directed by McG and shows clips of Korn performing in front of an energetic crowd, similar to "Blind". Korn is also seen performing in front of a fake castle-like building. Munky can be seen with duct tape over his mouth while coming out from a field of weeds. In the beginning, Jonathan can be seen tied up and hanging upside down. Head, Fieldy, and David appear in various clips as well, but is not very specific. The video premiered in June 1995. "Shoots and Ladders" was filmed at Golf N' Stuff in Norwalk, California.

== Awards ==
The song was nominated for a Grammy Award in 1997 for Best Metal Performance. This would be Korn's first nomination in any Grammy category.

== Track listing ==
(Source:)

=== US radio promo ===
- CD5"
1. "Shoots and Ladders" – 3:39 (radio edit)
2. "Sean Olson" – 4:45 (radio edit)

=== UK radio promo ===
- 10"

Side A:

1. "Shoots and Ladders (Hip Hop Remix)" – 4:07
2. "Shoots and Ladders (Hyper Remix)" – 2:32

Side B:

1. "Shoots and Ladders (Industrial Remix)" – 3:50
2. "Shoots and Ladders (Industrial Instrumental)" – 3:59

== Personnel ==
Korn

- Jonathan Davis – vocals, bagpipes
- Munky – guitar
- Head – guitar
- Fieldy – bass
- David Silveria – drums

Other

- Ross Robinson – production
- Eddy Schreyer – mastering
- Stephen Stickler – photography
- Jay Papke/Dante Ariola – art direction and design
- Chuck Johnson – engineering and mixing

== Charts ==
Chart (1996)	Peak position
US Active Rock Top 50 (Radio & Records)	50
US Alternative Top 50 (Radio & Records)	41
