= Korn =

American nu metal band

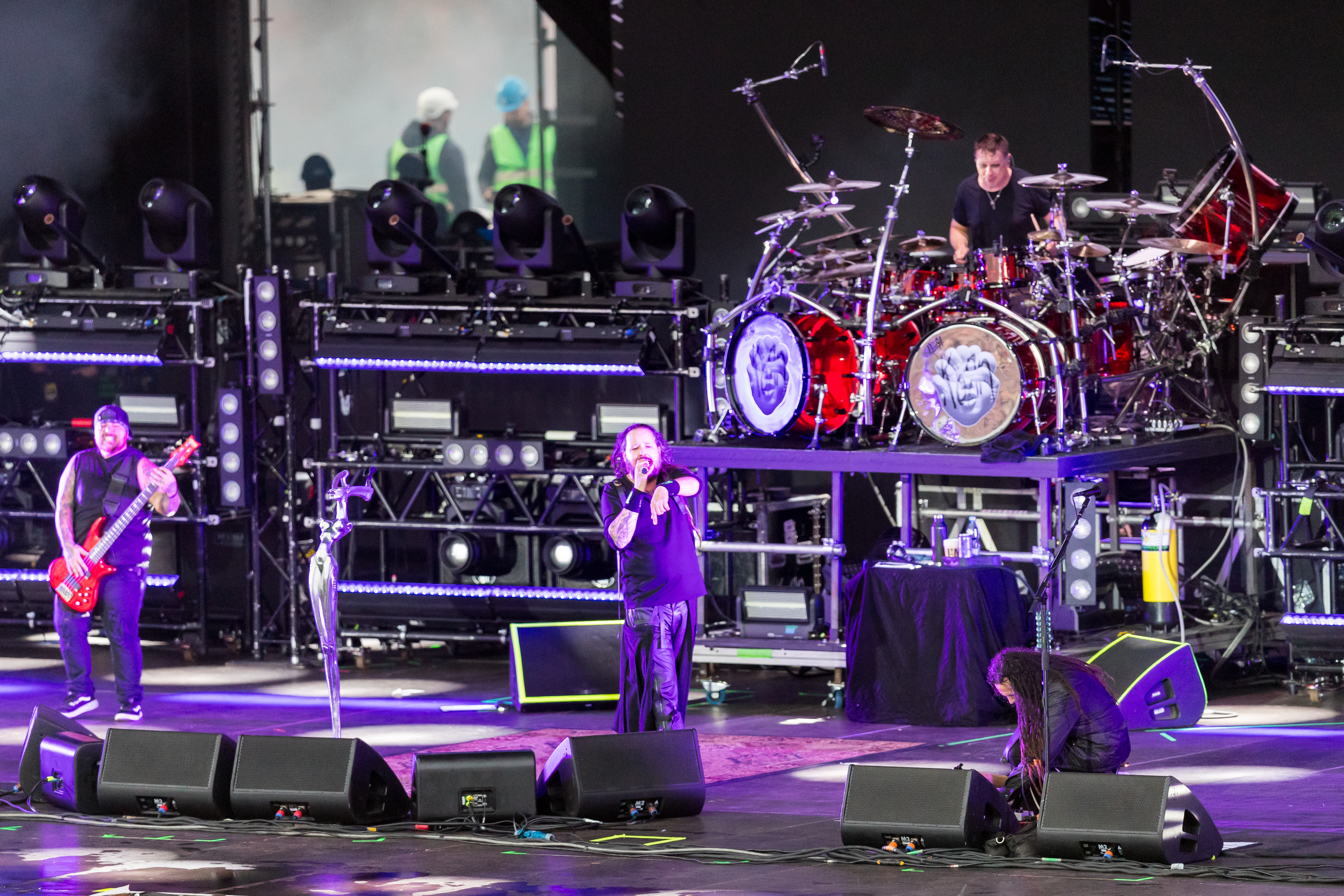
- Korn performing at Rock am Ring in 2022

Background information
- Origin: Bakersfield, California, U.S.
- Genres: Nu metal; alternative metal
- Works: Discography; songs; solo projects
- Years active: 1993–present
- Labels: Loma Vista; Concord; Prospect Park; Caroline; Roadrunner; Elektra; Virgin; Epic; Immortal
- Spinoffs: Sexart; Jonathan Davis and the SFA; Fieldy's Dreams
- Spinoff of: L.A.P.D.
- Members: Jonathan Davis; James Shaffer; Brian Welch; Ray Luzier
- Past members: David Silveria; Reginald Arvizu
- Website: kornofficial.com

Korn (stylized as KoЯn) is an American nu metal band from Bakersfield, California, originally formed in 1993 by James "Munky" Shaffer, Reginald "Fieldy" Arvizu, and David Silveria, who were members of the band L.A.P.D. Their current lineup features Shaffer (guitar), Brian "Head" Welch (guitar), Jonathan Davis (vocals), and Ray Luzier (drums), the last of whom replaced Silveria in 2007. The band is notable for pioneering and popularizing the nu metal genre.

Korn made a demo tape, Neidermayer's Mind, in 1993, which was distributed free to record companies and on request to members of the public. Their debut album Korn was released in 1994, followed by their commercial breakthrough, Life Is Peachy, in 1996. The band first experienced mainstream success with Follow the Leader (1998) and Issues (1999), both of which debuted at number one on the Billboard 200. The band's mainstream success continued with Untouchables (2002), Take a Look in the Mirror (2003), and See You on the Other Side (2005).

A compilation album, Greatest Hits Vol. 1, was released in 2004, spanning a decade of singles and concluding the band's recording contract with Immortal Records and Epic Records. They signed to Virgin Records, releasing See You on the Other Side in 2005, and an untitled album in 2007. The band's other recent albums, Korn III: Remember Who You Are (2010) and The Path of Totality (2011), were released via Roadrunner Records, with The Paradigm Shift (2013) being released via Prospect Park and Caroline Records. The Serenity of Suffering (2016) saw their return to Roadrunner Records, through which The Nothing was released on September 13, 2019. Their latest album, Requiem, was released via Loma Vista Recordings on February 4, 2022.

As of 2021, Korn had sold more than 40 million records worldwide. Several of their releases have been certified gold, platinum or multi-platinum by the Recording Industry Association of America (RIAA). Fourteen of the band's official releases have peaked in the top ten of the Billboard 200, eight of which have peaked in the top five. Korn has earned two Grammy Awards out of eight nominations and two MTV Video Music Awards out of 11 nominations. Several of their music videos received substantial play on MTV's Total Request Live, and were among the first to be retired on the show, including "Got the Life" and "Freak on a Leash".

== History ==
=== Early years and formation (1989–1993) ===
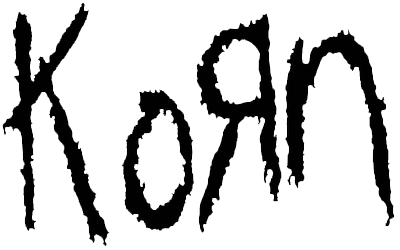
Korn's original logo designed by Jonathan Davis

Before Korn was formed, three of the original members of the band were associated with the band L.A.P.D.–James Shaffer, Reginald Arvizu, and David Silveria. The group originally consisted of Shaffer, Arvizu, and lead vocalist Richard Morrill; Silveria joined when he was 16. When the band moved from Bakersfield, California to Los Angeles, Silveria dropped out of high school and Shaffer stayed in Bakersfield. When Shaffer reunited with the band, they found a manager and released an EP entitled Love and Peace Dude in 1989 through Triple X Records. L.A.P.D. released their sole full-length studio album Who's Laughing Now on May 3, 1991. After the album's release, Morrill departed from the ensemble. The remaining trio were also briefly known as Creep, recording a demo with a singer named Corey before enlisting Brian Welch and Jonathan Davis to form the band that went on to become Korn.

"Predictable" (1993)
30-second sample of the demo version of "Predictable", which the band would eventually re-record for their debut album. The demo tape, Neidermayer's Mind featured the first captured, recorded sound of Korn in the form of four tracks.

When thinking of a band name, someone suggested "corn", but the band rejected that name, but Shaffer later had the idea to spell the name with a "K" instead of a "C", and a backwards "R", so the band's name would appear as "KoЯn". The idea of using a backwards "R" came from the logo of toy retailer Toys R Us, for which many of the band members had previously worked. Silveria explained the logo, designed by Davis, "the music makes the name, because Korn's a dumb name. But once we get established, it makes the name cool."

Korn rented a studio from Jeff Creath called Underground Chicken Sound, in Huntington Beach, California. While they were recording there, a crowd had been loitering outside the studio. The band began playing a prelude to a later song "Clown", attracting a larger crowd. Arvizu said the crowd gathered because it sounded so "different." Korn started performing at gigs in the summer of 1993, with members saying that touring was a "pain-in-the-ass." While in Huntington Beach, the band was spotted by Immortal Records A&R employee Paul Pontius. Pontius would describe Korn's sound as "the new genre of rock." In 1993, Korn released their first demo album, Neidermayer's Mind, which had very limited printing. It was not well received by critics or the public. It was released to record companies and to people who filled out a flyer given out at gigs they played for free with Biohazard and House of Pain. With this demo, Korn pioneered the nu metal sound, riffs, and rhythm.

=== Korn, Life Is Peachy and recognition (1994–1997) ===
By May 1994, Korn began recording their self-titled debut album with Ross Robinson. Recording was finished by the end of the following month, and on October 11, the band's debut album was released through Immortal Records (an Epic imprint label); it peaked at number one on the Billboard Heatseekers Albums chart and would eventually reach number 72 on the Billboard 200 in February 1996. The album received positive reviews by critics, and is said to have established the new wave of metal. As well as sparking the nu metal genre, it also started record producer Ross Robinson's music career and influenced bands such as Slipknot, Coal Chamber, and Limp Bizkit.

After the band finished recording the album, they began touring with Biohazard and House of Pain. Their record company gave them enough money for their own tour bus. Korn's first gig was in Atlanta. About halfway through the tour, the bus that Korn's record company gave them stopped working, and the band had to find a new one. Their first tour was not very successful in promoting the album.

Korn went on tour with hardcore punk band Sick of It All in January 1995. The band embarked on their first European tour, including at LA2 in London and L'Arapaho in Paris. Later that year, Korn was chosen alongside Deftones as direct support for Ozzy Osbourne. Korn's self-titled album went gold in the midst of the tour and was eventually certified two-times platinum by the Recording Industry Association of America (RIAA). Aside from touring, Korn released four singles. "Blind" was released on August 1, 1994, and "Shoots and Ladders" was released on October 31, 1995. The latter received a Grammy nomination in 1997 for Best Metal Performance. "Need To" was also released in 1995, on April 8. The fourth and final single, "Clown", was released on February 2, 1996. "Blind" was the only single to chart, peaking at number 15 on the Canadian RPM Alternative 30.

After the success of their debut, Korn decided to enter the studio again for a second album. By then, the band had created a large fan base, having played between 200 and 250 shows, and the expectations for their follow-up album were high. They went back into the studio in early April 1996 at Indigo Ranch Studios, Malibu, California.

...We went in really fresh, and we wanted to get it done quickly to capture that energy. So it was probably about 60% knowing what I was going to play and 40% just playing whatever came to mind at that moment... It ended up really good, and it has a kind of energy I probably wouldn't have gotten if I'd worked everything out before hand.

— David Silveria on Life Is Peachy's drum quality.

Life Is Peachy was released October 15, 1996 and despite minimal radio airplay and television attention, the album debuted at number three on the Billboard 200, and peaked at number one in New Zealand. The album sold 106,000 copies in its first week. Jon Pareles from The New York Times said that the band was "mad at everybody, including themselves." The album was certified double platinum in the United States, platinum in Australia, and gold in Canada.

The first single, "No Place to Hide", spawned a Grammy nomination for Best Metal Performance. "A.D.I.D.A.S." was released as the second single on March 4, 1997. It became the band's first charting single on Billboard, peaking at number 13 on the Bubbling Under Hot 100 chart. The third single, "Good God", was released on July 14, 1997. A promotional disc was released in 1997 to promote both the band and the Life Is Peachy Tour featuring Incubus and the Urge and included three live tracks.

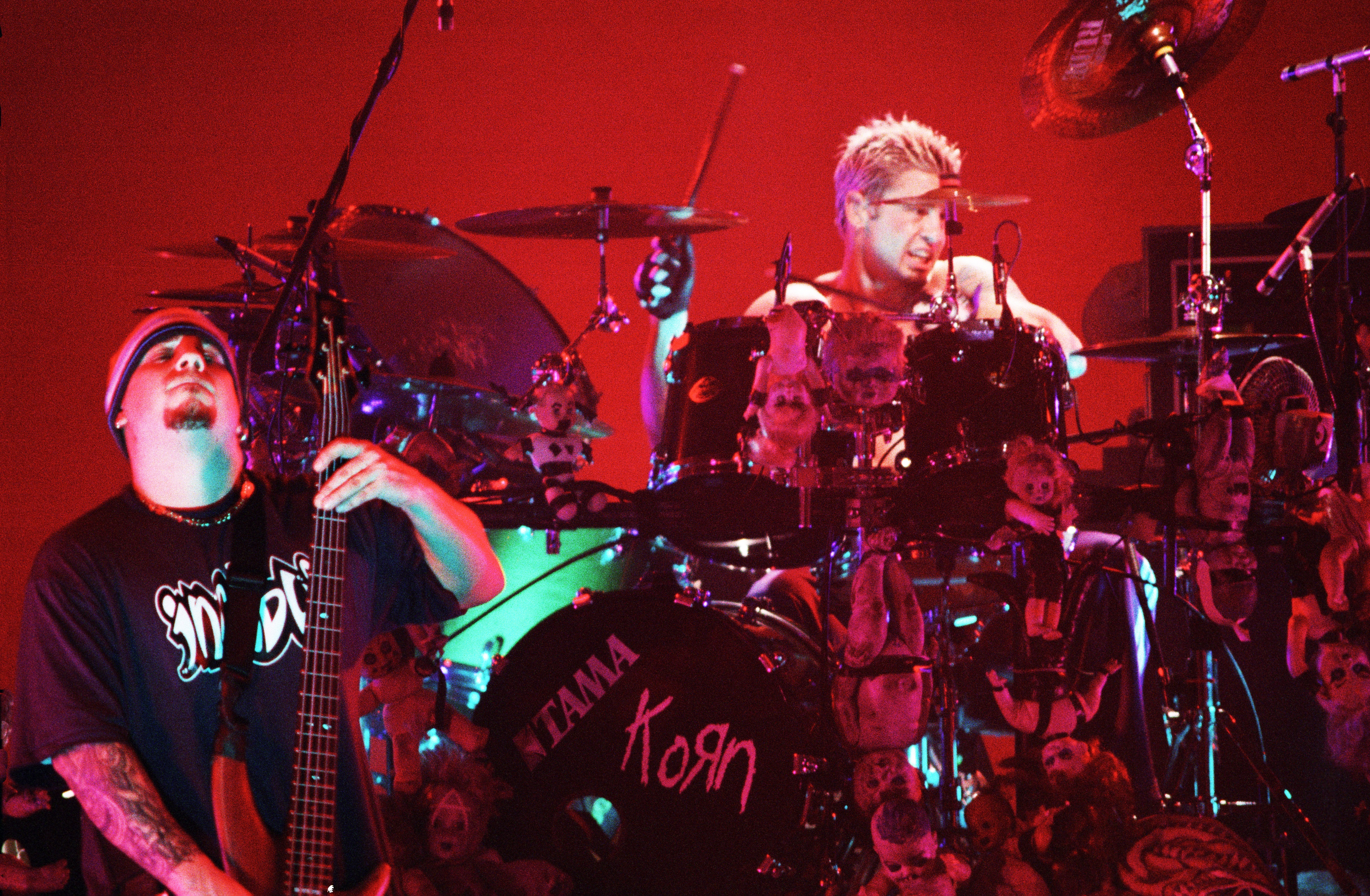
Arvizu (left) and Silveria (right) at the Brixton Academy in London during the Life Is Peachy Tour, February 24, 1997

Korn gained more popularity after co-headlining the Lollapalooza summer tour festival in 1997 with Tool. However, Korn was forced to stop touring after Shaffer was diagnosed with viral meningitis. The band remained relatively quiet during the end of the year, resting and setting new goals. The band then founded their own label, Elementree Records, to sign and introduce new bands to their fans. The label was run by Davis who first signed Orgy. Silveria influenced Davis to sign them.

Prior to the release of 1998's Follow the Leader, Gretchen Plewes, a Zeeland, Michigan high school assistant principal, said in an interview for a Michigan newspaper that Korn's music is "indecent, vulgar, obscene and intends to be insulting" after giving a student named Eric VanHoven a one-day suspension for wearing a shirt with the Korn logo. FM station WKLQ was filmed giving away hundreds of free Korn T-shirts, donated by the band outside the school. Ottawa County Police were called by the school, but they ended up helping handing out shirts. Korn filed a cease and desist order against Plewes and the school district for their comments. They also threatened a multimillion-dollar lawsuit, but dropped both actions due to the band members' personal lives. The period from 1993 to 1997 was embodied by wearing apparel that featured the Adidas clothing brand.

=== Follow the Leader and Issues (1998–2001) ===
In 1998, Korn signed a publishing contract with Warner Chappell Music. While Korn was waiting for a full partnership with Adidas (which had previously sponsored Run-DMC), the sportwear brand refused to sign a contract with Korn. In a contradictory argument, Adidas told them: "We do sports, not music". In 1998, Puma seized the opportunity and offered a $500,000 deal to Korn, including their music featured in Kevin Kerslake-directed advertisements. Korn accepted the contract; Davis said, "That's more than Adidas ever did for us! It wasn't a sell-out thing. It was about respect."

Prior to the release of the band's third album, Korn produced a weekly online TV show called KornTV, which documented the making of the record and featured special guests such as porn star Ron Jeremy, Limp Bizkit, and 311. The project also gave fans (nicknamed "nibletz") the chance to call in and ask the band questions, an approach that represented one of the first times a band utilized the Internet in such a way. Korn released their third album Follow the Leader on August 18, 1998, which featured a number of guest vocalists such as Ice Cube; Pharcyde member Tre Hardson; Fred Durst of Limp Bizkit; and actor Cheech Marin on the hidden track "Earache My Eye" (written by Marin himself).

"Freak on a Leash" (1998)
Both "Freak on a Leash" and "Got the Life" are considered to be among the first music videos retired from MTV's Total Request Live. The song was described as a "rolling exorcism."

Korn launched a political campaign-styled tour to promote Follow the Leader's release, which took the group on a chartered jet all over North America. Band members talked to fans and answered questions during special "fan conferences" organized at every stop along the tour and signed autographs. Jim Rose of the Jim Rose Circus hosted the entire "Kampaign" tour.

The album was considered a complete success by the band, debuting at number one on the Billboard 200 with at least 268,000 copies sold in its first week of release and, among other singles, spawning two of their biggest singles: "Got the Life" and "Freak on a Leash". They both exposed Korn to a wider mainstream audience, with the music videos being mainstays on MTV's Total Request Live. "Got the Life" was the show's very first "retired" video, (Note: In the show, "retired" referred to the rule in which music videos that stayed atop the chart for 65 days were removed from rotation to allow other videos to play.) with "Freak on a Leash" also reaching retirement several months later. In September 1998, Korn signed with a second music publisher, Zomba Music Group, through negotiations of the band's then-manager Jeff Kwatinetz (the former CEO of The Firm), along with co-founders Peter Katsis and Michael Green.

"Freak on a Leash" won a Grammy for Best Music Video, Short Form, and received a nomination for Best Hard Rock Performance. The video also earned nine MTV Video Music Awards nominations for Video of the Year; Best Rock Video; Breakthrough Video; Best Direction; Best Special Effects; Best Art Direction; Best Cinematography; Best Editing; and Viewer's Choice. It eventually won two awards for Best Rock Video and for Best Editing. "Freak on a Leash" failed to enter the Billboard Hot 100, although it did manage to peak at number six on the Bubbling Under Hot 100 chart. Follow the Leader is considered by members of Korn to be the band's most commercially–successful album, being certified five-times platinum by the RIAA and having sold almost 10 million copies worldwide.

The band's fourth album, Issues, produced by Brendan O'Brien, was released on November 16, 1999, featuring cover art designed by Alfredo Carlos, who won an MTV contest held for the fans. Issues was released during a week of many highly anticipated records. It debuted at number one on the Billboard 200 with at least 573,000 copies sold, keeping Dr. Dre's second album 2001 and All the Way... A Decade of Song by Céline Dion from hitting number one.

To celebrate the album's release, the band performed the record in its entirety in front of a live audience at New York's historic Apollo Theater and broadcast the concert simultaneously across many radio stations. This performance marked the first performance by a rock band since Buddy Holly in the late 1950s. This special event featured the New York Police Department marching drum and bagpipe band conducted by Richard Gibbs, as well as a group of backup singers to enhance the more melodic choruses Davis used on the album. A snippet of "Falling Away from Me" was featured on RealVideo with a brief interpretive dance by bassist Reginald Arvizu, and also featured on their official website as an MP3 file, although its release was against the advice of its attorneys and the corporate establishment. The album was also promoted by the band's highly successful Sick and Twisted Tour.

A little before Korn's album Issues was released, the band appeared on an episode of South Park titled "Korn's Groovy Pirate Ghost Mystery", in which the first single from Issues, "Falling Away from Me", was premiered. The single became Korn's first entry on the Billboard Hot 100, reaching number 99. "Make Me Bad" was released as the album's second single in February 2000, peaking at number 14 on the Bubbling Under Hot 100 chart. A third single, "Somebody Someone", followed with more moderate success.

Music videos were filmed for all three singles, with long-time friend Fred Durst directing "Falling Away from Me" and Martin Weisz directing a concept video for "Make Me Bad", as well as a performance-based video for "Somebody Someone", which featured CGI effects. Every video was a staple on Total Request Live, two of which made it to retirement. Issues was described by Stephen Thomas Erlewine to be less hip-hop-oriented than Follow the Leader. It was certified three-times Platinum, following up the success of Follow the Leader. In 2001, the brand PONY reappeared in the clothing industry and initiated a partnership with Korn.

=== Untouchables, Take a Look in the Mirror and Welch's departure (2002–2005) ===
"Here to Stay" (2002)
"Here to Stay", the first single from Untouchables, went on to win Korn a Grammy in 2003. Jon Wiederhorn said "Although 'Here to Stay' is clearly a scathing commentary on contemporary America, Davis stressed that it's merely a wake-up call, not a cry for action."

On June 11, 2002, Korn re-emerged into the media with their fifth album Untouchables. It debuted at number two on the Billboard 200 with 434,000 in sales. The band has blamed music piracy for the drop in sales, as an unmastered version of the album had leaked three months prior to its official release date. On April 2, 2002, the Opie and Anthony Show began airing songs from Untouchables. After playing a few songs, the broadcasters received a cease-and-desist letter from Sony Music Entertainment. Opie and Anthony said "The reason for the premature premiere was to infuriate a rival New York station, which disallows their in-studio guests to appear on 'The Opie and Anthony Show.'" The release of this album was preceded by a show at the Hammerstein Ballroom in New York a day prior to the album's release broadcast digitally throughout movie theatres in the United States.

The album contained experiments and styles never previously attempted by Korn. AllMusic related: "The band is far more experimental this time out, delivering Helmet-like ringing guitars that melt and morph into each other, a mix of Metallica-esque blastbeats and tight funk drumming from the constantly improving David Silveria, and memorable riffs that take the shape of dark sound structures and offer more than just a collection of chords." The first two music videos from Untouchables, "Here to Stay" and "Thoughtless", were directed by the Hughes Brothers. "Here to Stay" earned Korn a Grammy Award for Best Metal Performance. "Here to Stay" peaked at number 72 on the Billboard Hot 100. During an interview with Wall of Sound, Munky revealed the album was the band's most expensive to make, but it produced several of his favourite songs, including "Thoughtless" and "Here To Stay".

Due to the album Untouchables leaking onto the Internet, Take a Look in the Mirror was released on Friday November 21, 2003– four days earlier than its original release date. The album therefore received a weekend's worth of sales, which resulted in a poor showing on the Billboard 200. During its first full week, Take a Look in the Mirror soared ten places from number 19 to number 9, increasing the album's total sales to 179,000.

It is the first album self-produced by Korn. The band explained that they wanted fans to hear the music as it should be. The album presented different styles and themes compared to previous albums. Lead vocalist Jonathan Davis related: "The whole album is about love, hate and my hate of people and just losing my mind. The previous albums I did, I think the last three, I was coming from a place of hurt. And I just finally got to the point where I'm done hurting and I'm just pissed off about it now. It's turned back to just sheer hate and anger. And it definitely comes across on the album." MTV News said that Davis convinced his fans that they "will be shocked, particularly with the album's second track, 'Break Some Off,' which he called 'brutal'."

Korn released the single "Did My Time" on July 22, 2003, which was used to promote the film Lara Croft: Tomb Raider - The Cradle of Life but did not appear on its soundtrack due to unspecified legal issues. The single debuted and peaked at number 38 on the Billboard Hot 100, becoming Korn's first and only top 40 hit in the United States. "Did My Time" gave Korn another Grammy nomination in the Best Metal Performance category.

Korn released their greatest hits album, Greatest Hits Vol. 1, on October 5, 2004. The album debuted at number four on Billboard, selling more than 129,000 copies. This album assembles choice tracks from six Korn studio albums released between 1994 and 2003. The first single was a cover of the song "Word Up!" originally composed by Cameo. The single peaked at number 23 on the Bubbling Under Hot 100 chart. Special editions of Greatest Hits Vol. 1 included a DVD titled Korn: Live at CBGB, featuring seven select songs from their show of November 24, 2003 at CBGB.

In early 2005, Brian Welch announced that he would be quitting the band. In front of a crowd of 10,000 in three services at Valley Bible Fellowship in Bakersfield, California, Welch said "I was addicted to methamphetamines and tried everything ... rehab, stuff on the Internet, but nothing helped me kick it. I was trying on my own to quit and couldn't do it. I wanted to die. No one knew what I was going through. I could not quit. Church was my last shot. I would sit in church high [on drugs]. I would wonder why people would go up to the front after the service. But one day it was for me. I said [to God], 'Show me how to quit.'"

In a 2013 interview with Rolling Stone, Head described his final moments in the band as very tense: "the last year I was in the band, we were gonna kick out the bass player, Fieldy, and this guy's girlfriend couldn't be on this side of the stage because there were fights with another wife in the band. And obviously the drugs – it's no secret I was into the drugs, so crazy stuff, like having to finish our blow right before we got to the border because they were gonna come check to see if we had anything." Following his departure from Korn, Welch released two autobiographies, a solo album, and formed a band named Love and Death, which released a debut album in 2013.

=== See You on the Other Side and Silveria's departure (2005–2007) ===
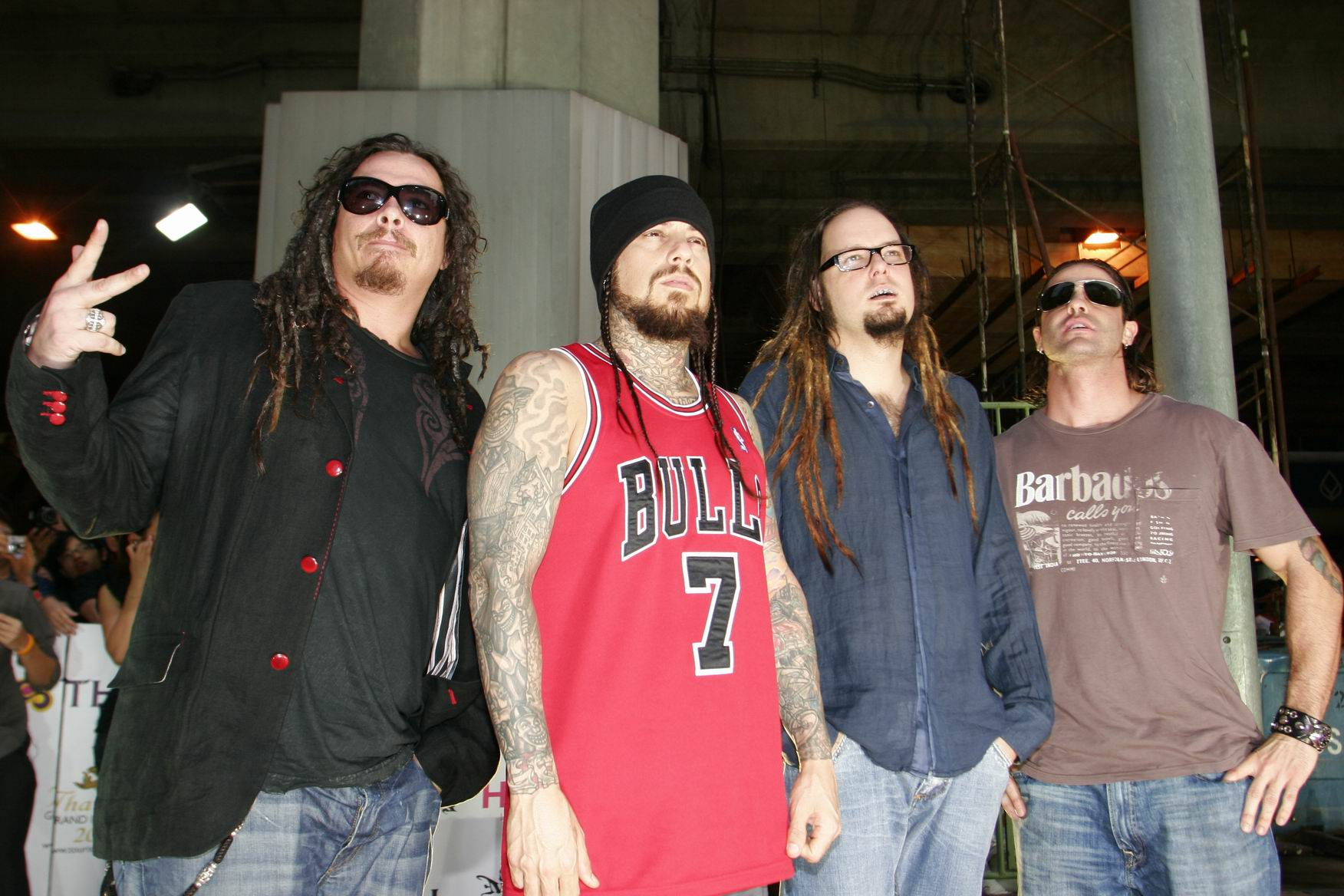
Korn at the MTV Asia Awards in Bangkok, Thailand, 2006

Upon completing their record deal with Sony, Korn partnered with EMI and signed to Virgin Records. As part of this innovative arrangement, Virgin paid Korn $25 million upfront in exchange for a share in the profits of their next two studio albums, including tours and merchandising. Virgin also received a 30 percent stake in the band's licensing, ticket sales, and other revenue sources.

It's taking Korn into another dimension for the listener, I think, that takes you to another world. I think it's really emotional, as far as it's not so anger-based. You know, I think it's a more well-rounded emotional journey it kinda takes you on, the listener.

— James "Munky" Shaffer on See You on the Other Side.

The band's first album for Virgin Records, See You on the Other Side, was released on December 6, 2005, and debuted at number three on the Billboard 200, scanning close to 221,000 copies. The album managed to stay in the top half of the Billboard 200 for 34 consecutive weeks. The first single from the album, "Twisted Transistor", was accompanied by a music video directed by Dave Meyers in which hip-hop artists Xzibit, Lil Jon, Snoop Dogg, and David Banner portray Korn. "Twisted Transistor" peaked at number 64 on the Billboard Hot 100. The second single, "Coming Undone", was released in February 2006, peaking at number 79 on the Billboard Hot 100. The music video was directed by Little X. See You on the Other Side was certified Platinum in the United States, and by mid-2007, the album had sold over 2.2 million copies worldwide.

Korn held a press conference at the Hollywood Forever Cemetery on January 13, 2006, announcing the See You on the Other Side Tour. 10 Years and Mudvayne were selected to open all dates of the tour, which kicked off in their hometown of Bakersfield on what Mayor Harvey Hall officially declared as "Korn Day", February 24. The resurrection of their Family Values Tour was announced on April 18, 2006, which featured co-headliners Deftones, Stone Sour, Flyleaf, and the Japanese metal group Dir En Grey on the main stage. Korn and Evanescence co-headlined the 2007 edition, with Atreyu, Flyleaf, Hellyeah, and Trivium rounding out the main stage.

While promoting See You on the Other Side in Europe, Jonathan Davis was diagnosed with idiopathic thrombocytopenic purpura, a blood platelet disorder that hospitalized him for the weekend and prevented him from performing at the renowned Download Festival. Despite the illness, the band still performed with guest singers, including Corey Taylor of Slipknot and Stone Sour fame; Trivium's Matt Heafy; Skindred's Benji Webbe; and Avenged Sevenfold's M. Shadows. This led to Korn canceling the rest of their European bill for 2006, including the Hellfest Summer Open Air. It was originally unknown to the public what his ailment was, but the singer revealed in a letter to fans that he was "dangerously low on blood platelets and at a high risk of death from a hemorrhage if the problem was not treated".

In early December 2006 it was announced that founding drummer David Silveria would be taking an indefinite "temporary hiatus" from the band. Korn then performed at the MTV studios in Times Square on December 9, 2006, for the MTV Unplugged series, which was broadcast on February 23, 2007, through MTV.com and on March 2, 2007, across North American, South American, European, and Asian MTV stations. Korn played a 14-song acoustic set, complete with guest appearances by the Cure and Amy Lee of Evanescence. The performance was eventually cut down to 11 songs for the album, two of which did not air on MTV. Sales of nearly 51,000 brought MTV Unplugged: Korn to number nine in its first week out.

=== Untitled eighth album, Luzier's addition and Korn III: Remember Who You Are (2007–2011) ===
Korn's untitled album was released on July 31, 2007, debuting at number two on the Billboard 200 with 123,000 copies sold in its first week. The album was certified gold by the RIAA. It concluded Korn's deal with Virgin Records and features touring keyboardist Zac Baird. Drumming duties were left up to Terry Bozzio and Bad Religion's Brooks Wackerman, as David Silveria went on a hiatus. Joey Jordison from Slipknot played drums during Korn's live shows until the permanent addition of Ray Luzier (Army of Anyone, David Lee Roth). This confirmed David's departure. "Evolution" and "Hold On" were released as singles to promote the untitled album. The former peaked at number seven on the Bubbling Under Hot 100 chart. A third single, "Kiss", had a limited release in April 2008. Korn covered the song "Kidnap the Sandy Claws" in 2008, which was originally performed by Paul Reubens, Catherine O'Hara, and Danny Elfman and was released on the compilation album Nightmare Revisited. Ubisoft reported in October 2008 that Korn had "written and recorded an original song inspired by Ubisoft's Haze video game, simply entitled "Haze", which was released on April 22, 2008. Korn also released a live DVD, Live at Montreux 2004, one of their performances with former guitarist Brian Welch on May 12, 2008.

"Oildale (Leave Me Alone)" (2010)
Roadrunner Records said that "Oildale (Leave Me Alone)" "buzzes with an eerie clean guitar that slowly gives way to a steamrolling bass and riff assault."

In a YouTube video, bassist Reginald "Fieldy" Arvizu affirmed that a charity song titled "A Song for Chi" would be released, featuring Slipknot guitarist Jim Root; Clint Lowery of Sevendust; drummer Dave McClain of Machine Head; and former Korn guitarist Brian "Head" Welch, among many other musicians. The song was intended to raise money for Deftones bassist Chi Cheng, who fell into a comatose state following a car accident in November 2008.

...Korn III: Remember Who You Are isn't a numbering device, it signifies an opening of another phase in Korn's career. Somehow, the band has bypassed a Korn II altogether in their discography, but it's commonly acknowledged that the tail-end of the 2000s found the group floundering a bit, going so far as to flirt with the Matrix in an attempt to figure out which direction to go now that they've hit middle age.

— Stephen Thomas Erlewine on Korn III: Remember Who You Are

Along with the announcement of the Ballroom Blitz Tour in March 2010, the title for the new album was revealed as Korn III: Remember Who You Are. Later that month, Munky announced that Korn has officially signed to Roadrunner Records. Jonathan Davis later confirmed the record deal: "We're going to go to Roadrunner. [It is] real exciting for us, too, because they're one of the last record companies to let you do what you want to do." Davis continued, "All the great bands around are on that label and everything seems to just work out right and it seems like a good home for us right now." The lead single, "Oildale", was made available for streaming in May 2010. "Oildale (Leave Me Alone)" was simultaneously released to radio stations and became a top-10 hit on the Billboard Mainstream Rock airplay chart. A music video directed by Phil Mucci received an exclusive premiere on MTV2.

Korn III: Remember Who You Are was released on July 13, 2010. It debuted and peaked at number two on the Billboard 200 with 63,000 purchases reported. A second single, "Let the Guilt Go", was released that same month, reaching number 23 on Mainstream Rock. "Pop a Pill" was scheduled to be the third single from Korn III: Remember Who You Are, but plans were scrapped by Roadrunner Records due to unsatisfactory results with previous singles. Korn co-headlined the Music as a Weapon V tour with Disturbed in late 2010 and early 2011. The tour also featured supporting acts Sevendust and In This Moment.

=== The Path of Totality, The Paradigm Shift and Welch's return (2011–2015) ===
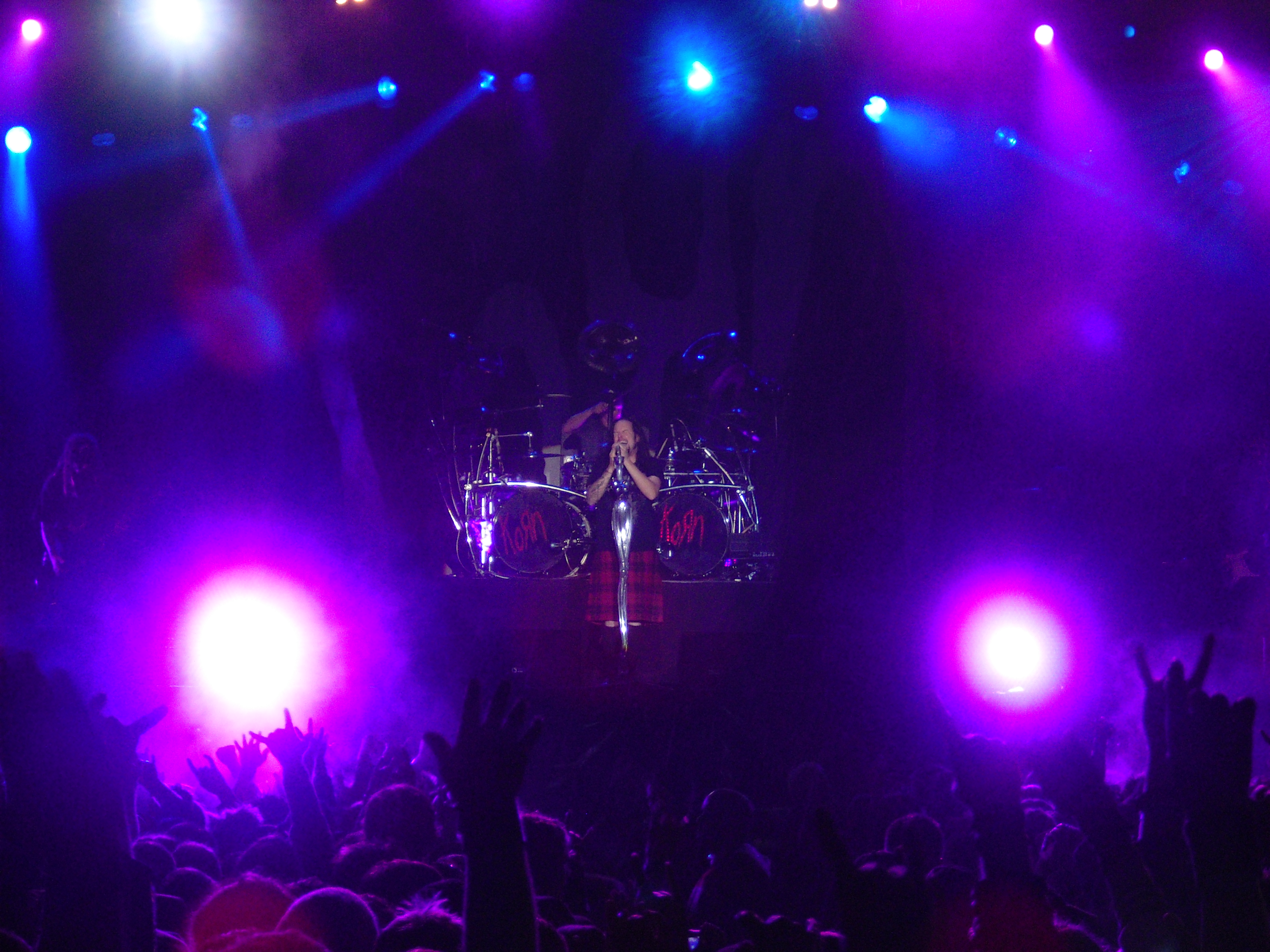
Korn performing live at the Metaltown Festival, Gothenburg, Sweden in June 2011

Korn's tenth studio album, The Path of Totality, was released on December 6, 2011. It was the second and final studio album for Roadrunner Records. The album features contributions from Skrillex; 12th Planet; Excision; Downlink; Kill the Noise; Noisia; and various other EDM artists. The Path of Totality debuted and peaked at number ten on the Billboard 200 with 55,000 copies scanned. "Get Up!" was premiered as the lead single via Spin in April 2011. The single managed to peak at number eight on the Bubbling Under Hot 100 chart. It eventually became their first single to be certified gold in the United States. The second single, "Narcissistic Cannibal", was released in October 2011, with its music video being directed and produced by Alexander Bulkley of ShadowMachine Films.

After a stint of festival appearances, Korn promoted The Path of Totality during a headlining tour of the same name. Korn split their show into three sections. The band kicked off by playing tracks from their first two albums, including the B-side "Proud", which was originally included on the soundtrack to the 1997 film I Know What You Did Last Summer. They followed with a different stage set up, playing several of their new songs. The set list ended with hit singles and an encore. Other appearances came from Datsik, Downlink, and Dope D.O.D. A special album release performance filmed and recorded at the Hollywood Palladium was issued in various formats through Shout! Factory in September 2012. The Path of Totality won Album of the Year at the 2012 Revolver Golden Gods Awards. This was Korn's first victory at the Golden Gods Awards, a ceremony that celebrates the best in hard rock and heavy metal music. Korn was also inducted into the Kerrang! Hall of Fame during the 2011 Kerrang! Awards. On May 5, 2012, guitarist Brian "Head" Welch joined Korn on stage at the Carolina Rebellion festival to play "Blind" for the first time since his departure. As recalled in the documentary DVD Reconciliation, Welch's appearance was a spur-of-the-moment decision: Welch initially visited the festival because of his daughter, who was a fan of bands performing. Welch joined Red on stage for a song, and would eventually be persuaded to join his old bandmates in Korn for a meet and greet. Upon Korn preparing for the show, the guitar tech prepared an extra guitar and amplifier for Welch, "just in case".

On July 18, 2012, Jonathan Davis told Billboard.com that Korn was getting ready to start recording their eleventh studio album that would be released independently. It was also announced that their next album would not contain any dubstep influences like The Path of Totality. Guitarist James "Munky" Shaffer stated in an interview with the Phoenix New Times that the new album would be heavier, with more aggressive "in-your-face" guitars and vocals. He went on to say that he would be using new recording techniques in the studio to give his riffs a fresh approach.

In November 2012, Mudvayne bassist Ryan Martinie toured Korn as a temporary replacement for Reginald Arvizu, who stayed at home during his wife's pregnancy. That month also saw the confirmation of Welch's return to the band. His comeback was initially thought to be temporary as he was only scheduled for two shows in June 2013 at Rock Am Ring and Rock Im Park, but Ray Luzier announced at the January 25 Sabian show during NAMM that Welch would be working the whole tour. In January 2013, techno artist Beta Traxx acknowledged he was working on a new Korn song for their upcoming album, which he commented would sound "like the past and the future at the same time." Luzier affirmed that the album would be produced by Don Gilmore. The BK Entertainment Group updated their clients list on February 12 and attested that Korn had signed to their management's independent label - Prospect Park Productions. On June 1, Caroline Records added Korn to their roster confirming that the band have been signed on to a contract with the label; they are partnered with Korn's management Prospect Park. On February 18, 2013, Korn posted a photo showing Head as part of the line up, which escalated rumors that he was in the process to rejoin Korn permanently. This was confirmed by Head himself in May, when it was also confirmed that he had been recording as part of the band for their upcoming album.

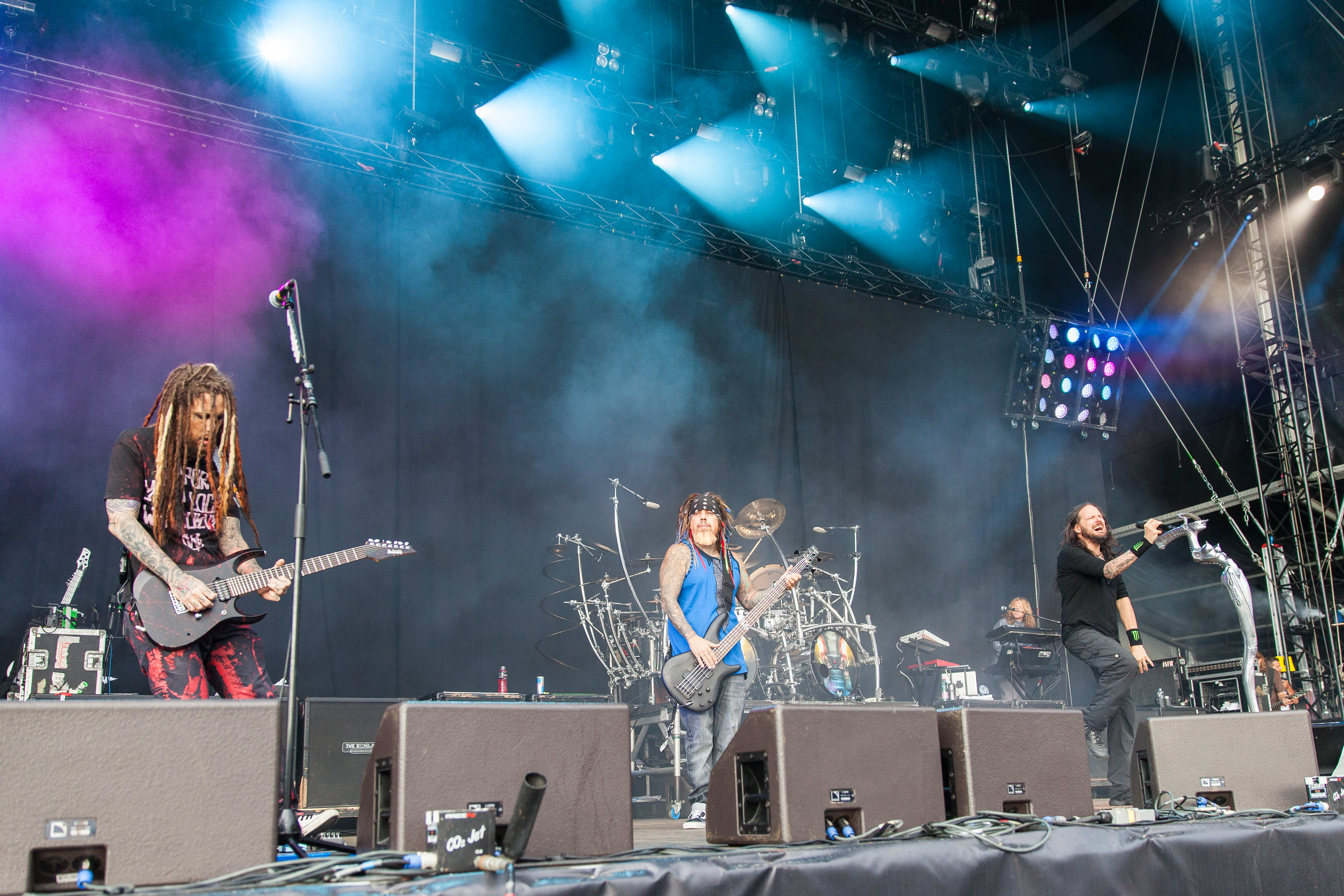
Korn performing live at the Rock 'n' Heim Rock Festival in August 2014

Fieldy has said of the album "Right now, I will tell you this ... we've done something we've never done before. Normally if we do a new Korn record, we'll normally put 12 or 13 songs and that's how many we make. This time we've made 20-plus songs, and we'll put the best of what we have on there, whatever the numbers end up being. We have so many to choose from, I think it's going to be a little extra special this time." Munky later confirmed this by saying that the band completed 25 songs and 15 of them would be put on the album. Head later elaborated that musically this was Korn's best album.

Korn's eleventh studio album, The Paradigm Shift, was released on October 8, 2013. Their first single, "Never Never" was set to be released August 12, 2013. The band recorded an episode of Guitar Center Sessions for DirecTV on September 11, 2013, which is scheduled to premiere November 1, 2013 on DirecTV Audience Channel. Korn will also be the latest act to be inducted into the world-famous Hollywood Rockwalk on October 8, 2013.

The band brought back their Family Values Tour as a one-day festival, on October 5, 2013. The venue and line up were revealed on September 3, 2013. The music video for "Spike in My Veins" was released on February 6, 2014. The band performed the entirety of their self-titled debut album on several occasions during 2015.

=== The Serenity of Suffering and The Nothing (2015–2020) ===
Korn soon began the process of writing new songs for a twelfth studio album. Guitarist Head described the music on the new album as "heavier than anyone's heard us in a long time." Their twelfth studio album The Serenity of Suffering was released on October 21, 2016. On July 14, 2016, guitarist James "Munky" Shaffer revealed to Metal Hammer that Corey Taylor of Slipknot/Stone Sour would make a guest appearance on the new album. He also revealed Nick Raskulinecz as the album's producer. On July 16, 2016, Korn premiered a new song, "Rotting in Vain", at Chicago Open Air Festival.

In late 2016, Zac Baird left the live band after 10 years. Jules Venturini completed the tour before Davey Oberlin was brought into the band. It was later announced that Fieldy would be missing Korn's South American tour and Robert Trujillo's then-12-year-old son Tye was brought in to perform with the band for the tour's duration. In March 2018, Korn embarked on a Japanese tour with support from Deadly Apples, including a stop at Vans Warped Tour Japan. On May 15, 2018, Korn announced the dates of special shows in order to mark the 20th anniversary of their album Follow the Leader. In order to mark the album's 20th anniversary, the band partnered with the clothing company Pleasures to release clothing merchandise dedicated to the album. In August 2018, Luzier reported via Instagram that Korn has begun the process of tracking drums for the upcoming thirteenth album. In a December 2018 interview to Revolver Magazine, Welch revealed that the upcoming album was scheduled for release in fall 2019, with Nick Raskulinecz resuming production duties. He also stated some of the tracks had been co-written with John Feldmann and that the band had tracked demos with Travis Barker on drums.

On June 25, 2019, the band revealed that their latest album, The Nothing, would be released on September 13, 2019, and unveiled its first single: "You'll Never Find Me". On August 2, the band released a brand new song from The Nothing called "Cold". On August 22, Korn announced their new album by playing a concert in multiplayer game AdventureQuest 3D, complete with in-game merchandise, a virtual meet-and-greet, and performing a new song on a digital stage. In July 2020, Korn released a cover of "The Devil Went Down to Georgia" by Charlie Daniels, who had died earlier that year. The cover was recorded during sessions for The Nothing and featured rapper Yelawolf and proceeds were donated to non-profit Awakening Youth. During an interview with Wall of Sound, Munky spoke about COVID ruining their plans to tour The Nothing, stating "It was kind of a fucking bummer, I gotta be honest man. I was so excited [with] that album. We put the artwork together, we designed the stages, we got everything ready to roll out, merch and all; you know everything a band does before they go on the road and promote an album."

=== Requiem, Fieldy's departure and upcoming fifteenth studio album (2021–present) ===
In his first online interview of 2021, Brian Welch revealed that the band had plans for 2021 but was coy about what they were, hinting it had something to do with touring in a powerful way. On April 24, 2021, Korn released a one-off, online streaming event entitled Monumental that was filmed on the top of a parking structure at the Stranger Things: A Drive-Into Experience set in Los Angeles.

On May 12, the band announced a 28-date summer U.S. tour with Staind as the supporting act. The 2021 tour came after Korn was forced to cancel their planned 2020 run with Faith No More due to the COVID-19 pandemic. On June 21, the band announced that their bassist Arvizu would be taking a hiatus and would not be performing with the band on their upcoming summer tour. Ra Díaz of Suicidal Tendencies replaced Arvizu on the tour. In May 2025, Fieldy clarified his current status with the band, stating that he does not anticipate returning to the band anytime soon. In April 2026, Fieldy revealed that not taking a COVID vaccination meant that he would not join the band on the 2021 tour, which then led to his permanent departure. He considers himself "retired" from Korn but has not ruled out a return.

The 2021 tour was marred by several separate instances where members contracted COVID-19: first, Jonathan Davis tested positive in August, causing several dates to be postponed. Then in September, Munky was forced to sit out several dates, being replaced by Love and Death guitarist JR Bareis while he recovered. Lastly, in October Ray Luzier also tested positive, missing the next three shows while Fever 333 drummer Aric Improta stepped in.

On April 23, the band confirmed that they had begun work on a fourteenth studio album, utilizing the period of lockdown due to COVID-19 to begin writing. The album was said to be fully written as of April 2021. A new single was released November 11 entitled "Start the Healing", with the music video debuting in a YouTube premiere. On January 13, 2022, the band released the second single from the album entitled "Forgotten". The album Requiem was released on February 4, 2022. On April 21, 2022, the band released a music video for the song, "Worst Is on Its Way".

Shortly prior to the release of Requiem, Davis revealed in an interview with Music Feeds that the band were already in the process of working on a follow-up studio album. Welch later stated in a September 2023 interview that a release of new material in 2024 was likely: "Yeah, [there will be] new music coming out next year. I don't know. We're just kind of in hiding right now, just doing our own thing." Welch reiterated in late March 2024 that work was still underway, speaking positively regarding the content recorded thus far. In early December, he stated that while the majority of the album had been written, there were no plans to release anything in the immediate future. Shaffer reiterated once more in 2025 that recording is still underway. Welch, in a February 2026 interview, clarified that while work on the album is still ongoing and there were plans to reconvene for exchange of new material, the band as a whole instead have decided to focus on touring-related endeavours due to already having a substantial catalogue of released works from the preceding decades. Immediately following this, a since-deleted post depicted Shaffer with Chris Lord-Alge strongly implying that the mixing process was underway. Shaffer stated in May that around 40 candidate songs had been written. Mark Bennett, Luzier's drum tech, revealed in September that the studio drum performances for the upcoming album had been fully recorded. As of March 2025, the elapsed time since the release of Requiem has become the longest thus far with no studio album release, exceeding the 1,109-day gap from The Paradigm Shift to The Serenity of Suffering.

On April 23, 2026, the group released a single, "Reward the Scars", which became their first song release in four years. The track appeared on the soundtrack for the Diablo IV: Lord of Hatred expansion pack.

== Artistry ==
=== Style and instrumentation ===
Korn is identified as the pioneers of nu metal music, a form of alternative metal music which began in the mid-1990s. Less common labels applied at some point include heavy metal, rap rock, rap metal, funk metal, groove metal and hard rock. The band is characterized by a style that incorporates downtuned guitars, a groove-heavy rhythm section, haunted atmospheric production, and dark lyrics. Their lyrics focus on pain and personal alienation rather than traditional heavy metal themes.

Historically, when Life Is Peachy was released, the band's music was not yet labeled "nu metal". Thus, in November 1996, Korn was described as "one of the key players in an American metal revival" alongside Deftones, "two bands that share the same roots". In the music community, there have been disagreements whether the band should be considered as "heavy metal". In 2015, lead singer Jonathan Davis commented, "Yeah, we're heavy and downtuned, but metal, to me, is like Judas Priest and Iron Maiden, that's metal man. I always thought of us as a funk band." Additionally, in an interview with Metal Hammer, Davis said that he had hated the "nu metal" tag. Korn is widely credited as the originators of the nu metal scene. The genre was suddenly inundated with imitators of their sound. Brian Welch told Metal Hammer: "We never gave that tag to ourselves, it was whoever made it up, you know? When you're in a band, you want to call the shots, you want to be in charge of your branding, and it was someone else who branded us that. And so we were like, 'No, that's not cool.' So we didn't like it." Davis changed his stance on the nu metal tag later: "If we invented nu-metal then fuck yeah, cool. It's pretty cool to say we helped invent some kind of movement, that's pretty insane. The last big movement was us. Other bands helped along the way, but we spearheaded that whole thing. [...] When we first started we were like, 'We're not a metal band, y'all' then they'd go 'Oh, then you're nu-metal!' Well fuck you!"

Bassist Reginald Arvizu plays his instrument using both the techniques of fingerstyle and slapping. Jonathan Davis was said by author Doug Small to be "the eye of the storm around which the music of Korn rages." Small described the band as "a basket-case full of contradictions."

=== Lyrical themes ===
Many of Korn's first works are based on early experiences. The song "Daddy" was described by lead singer Jonathan Davis: "When I was a kid, I was being abused by somebody else and I went to my parents and told them about it, and they thought I was lying and joking around. They never did shit about it. They didn't believe it was happening to their son.... I don't really like to talk about that song. This is as much as I've ever talked about it..." "Kill You" was written about Davis's experiences as a child with his stepmother. Follow the Leader marked the first album where the majority of the lyrics did not have origins relating to early occurrences, with songs like "Justin" and "Pretty" written about incidents occurring during adulthood.

=== Influences ===
A few years before establishing Korn, James "Munky" Shaffer; Reginald "Fieldy" Arvizu; and David Silveria (who were three members of the funk metal band L.A.P.D.), alongside friend Brian "Head" Welch, all had the common influences of Red Hot Chili Peppers and especially the Faith No More album The Real Thing. Likewise, Davis was greatly inspired by the adventurousness of The Real Thing upon its 1989 release: "It showed everybody you could do heavy music and not be 'metal'. It was something completely different."

In the Guitar World section "The Album that Changed My Life" of January 1997, Welch listed The Real Thing by Faith No More as the album that changed his life, while Arvizu named both the Red Hot Chili Peppers' Freaky Styley and Faith No More's Introduce Yourself. Fieldy's biggest bass influences were Flea from Red Hot Chili Peppers and Les Claypool from Primus. He was also greatly inspired by Billy Gould's chemistry with his Faith No More bandmates and Stanley Clarke. In 2015, asked about what record has stuck with him through the years, Munky first named 1992's Angel Dust by Faith No More, followed by Evil Empire by Rage Against the Machine and The Fragile by Nine Inch Nails. For his part, David Silveria named Mike Bordin of Faith No More one of his biggest influences.

Munky later acknowledged the song structures and instrumentations of Faith No More in inspiring Korn's future songwriting: "Faith No More steered us in the direction where we ultimately ended up." They became "fanatics" of Faith No More singer Mike Patton, researched about him, and traveled to the band's hometown of San Francisco in order to watch them play. In this way, they discovered Patton's avant-garde metal band Mr. Bungle, whose 1991 self-titled album had a long-standing impact on Korn's experimentation, dissonance, and eccentric stylings. A notable example of Bungle's influence has been what Korn dubbed the "Mr. Bungle chord" (a flat fifth chord or "tritone"), which became a band trademark throughout their discography. Many reviewers point out stark similarities between the vocals of Davis and several techniques employed by Patton, such as those from Angel Dust. Davis' rhythmic and aggressive singing was also based on toasting, a reggae/dancehall vocal style that emphasizes rhythm and embellishments.

Besides the projects of Patton, Korn had a wide range of influences that included groove-oriented metal acts such as Sepultura, Prong, and Biohazard, in addition to the dynamics and live performances of Rage Against the Machine and its frontman Zack de la Rocha. Head later explained that they tried to mix the weird elements of Bungle with catchy choruses and melodies, alongside the songwriting and grooves from those metal bands. On the other hand, Fieldy discards any influence classic rock groups like The Rolling Stones and Led Zeppelin have had on Korn; "Nobody in the band ever listened to that stuff." However, Jonathan Davis acknowledged in 2022 that the song that first made him interested in rock music was Led Zeppelin's "Whole Lotta Love" (1969).

Guitarist Munky and Head described their admiration for Steve Vai's ability to "make the guitar talk," saying it inspired how they approached tone and expression. Head specifically pointed out that Munky's fascination with Vai's 7‑string work led him to get one, and eventually Head followed suit. That low-register sound helped define Korn's signature groove, a musical shift they credit directly to Vai.

Much of Korn's work has also been inspired by hip-hop, as suggested in the band's song "All in the Family" and the cover song of Ice Cube's "Wicked". The band imitated the samples used by Cypress Hill, with Davis going as far to say "If there's no Cypress Hill there would be no Korn." The members of Korn are also influenced by Alice in Chains, Pantera, N.W.A, Bauhaus, Geto Boys, Van Halen, The Pharcyde, Nine Inch Nails, Deftones, and John Zorn.

== In other media ==
They have contributed music to the soundtracks for movies such as The Crow: City of Angels, I Know What You Did Last Summer, Spawn, End of Days, and Lara Croft: Tomb Raider – The Cradle of Life. The music of Korn has also been featured on various television series, including South Park (which they starred as guests), Beavis and Butt-head, and Daria. In 2026, Korn released "Reward the Scars" for the soundtrack of the video game Diablo IV: Lord of Hatred.

== Legacy ==
The band has sold over 40 million records worldwide as of 2021. Seven of their official releases are certified platinum by the Recording Industry Association of America (RIAA); two are certified double platinum; one is certified triple platinum; one is certified five times platinum; and two are certified Gold. Fourteen of their records have reached the top 10 of the Billboard 200, with eight reaching the top five; they are tied with Van Halen for the most top 10 records as a rock or metal artist. The band has also won two Grammy Awards from eight nominations.

In the book Nu-metal: The Next Generation of Rock & Punk, Korn was marked as the third biggest nu metal band in the world. Greg Kennelty of Metal Injection expressed the opinion that the band "practically invented" the genre, and stated that "their fingerprints are all over modern metal." Korn created a fan-base described by Doug Small and Eaton Entertainment as extremely loyal. Lauryn Schaffner of Loudwire referred to Korn as one of the "Big Four" of 1990s heavy metal, along with Sepultura, Pantera and Tool. Staff of the same publication also listed them as the 37th-best metal band of all time in a 2016 article.

Korn's debut album has been recognized for its influence on heavy music. Bands such as Coal Chamber and Limp Bizkit were inspired by the album's "churning rage, emphasizing similar grooves and song structures" and "the sound's hip-hop elements." Slipknot, Machine Head, and Sepultura were also inspired by Korn's debut album. The album launched the career of record producer Ross Robinson, who later produced albums such as Three Dollar Bill, Yall by Limp Bizkit, Sepultura's Roots and Slipknot's first two albums. Of their third album, Richard S. He of Billboard wrote: "More than any other album, Follow the Leader opened the floodgates for countless nu-metal acts to infiltrate the mainstream." Amy Lee of Evanescence also cited Korn as an influence growing up. Mucc guitarist Miya said that Davis' intense personal expressions in Korn influenced him to do the same in his own music.

Korn's music videos received significant play on Total Request Live, and alongside Limp Bizkit, the band was credited with pitting the nu metal genre against pop acts such as Backstreet Boys, NSYNC and Britney Spears. The band's videos had often peaked at the third spot of the show's chart, which was dubbed "the Korn spot". Four of their videos had retired from the show. They have also earned two Video Music Awards from 11 nominations.

== Band members ==
Korn live at Rock Im Park 2016

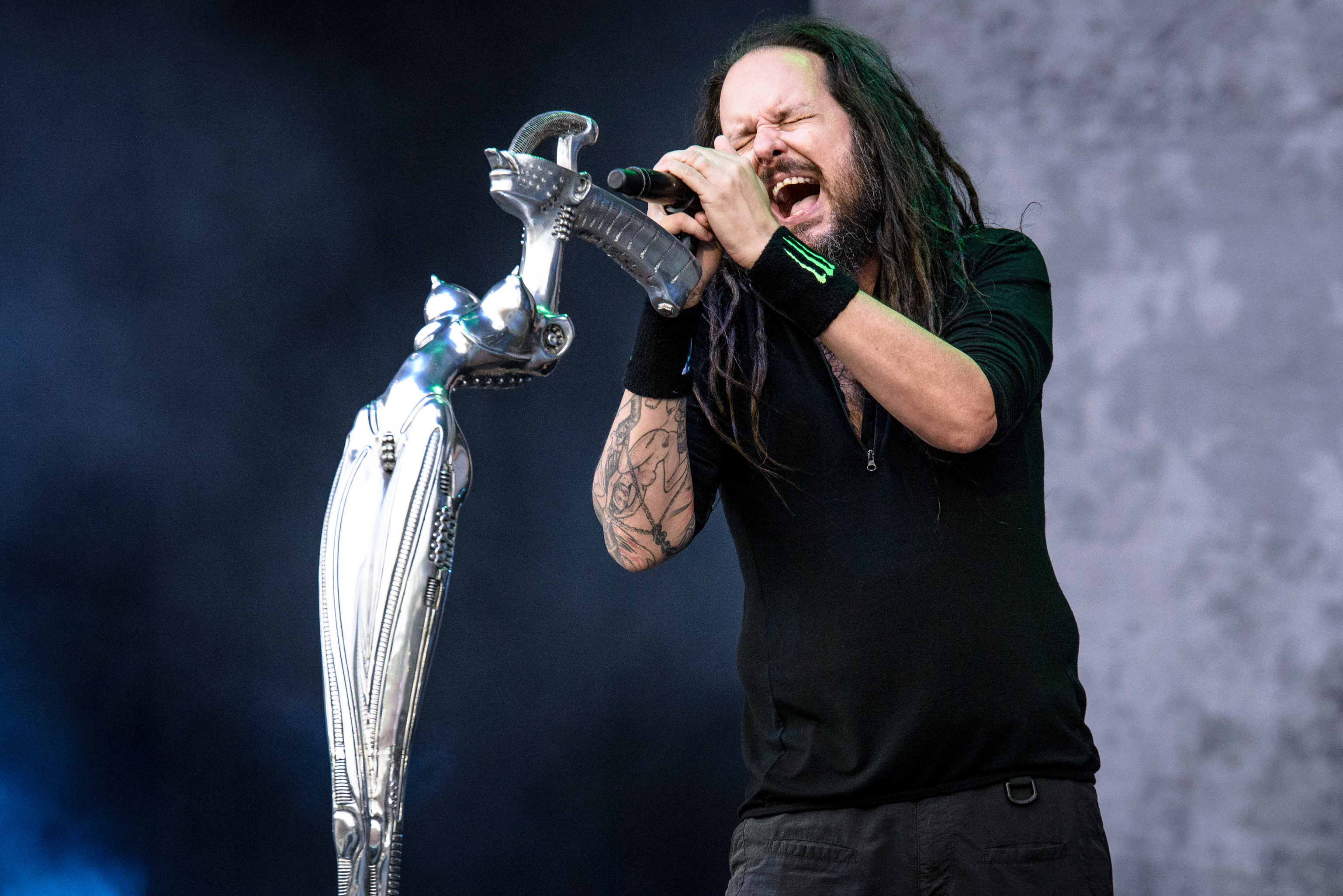
Jonathan Davis

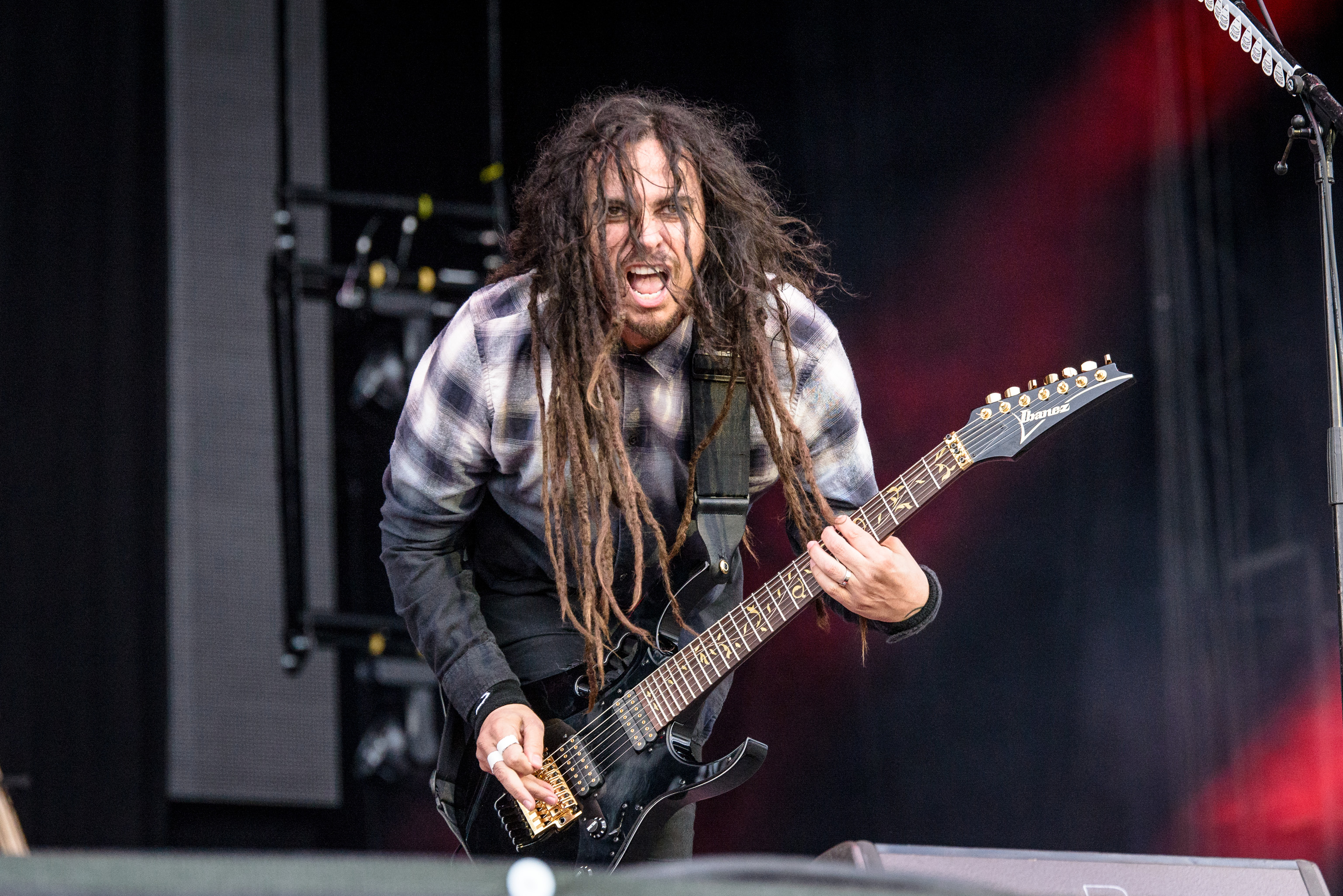
James "Munky" Shaffer

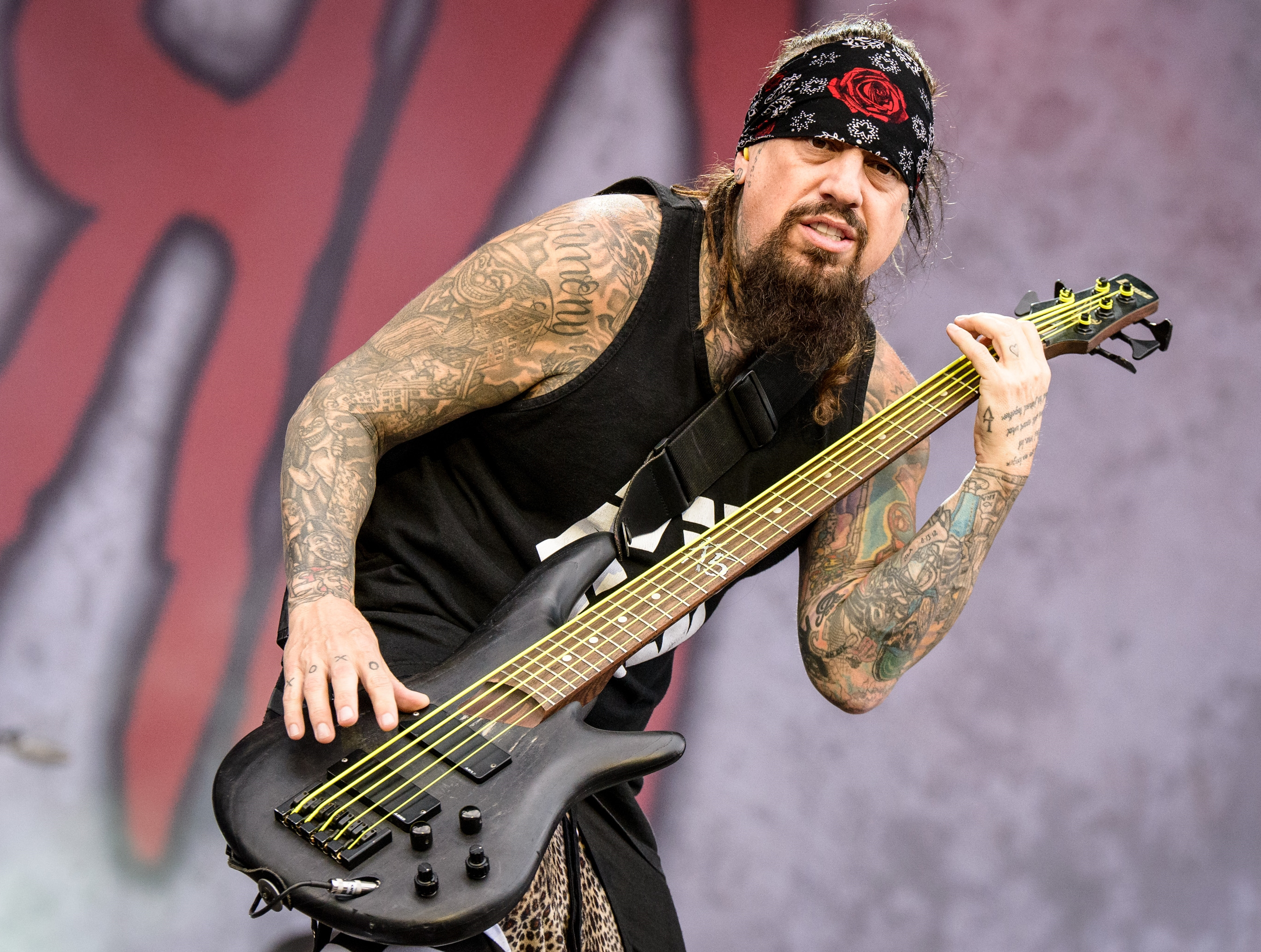
Reginald "Fieldy" Arvizu

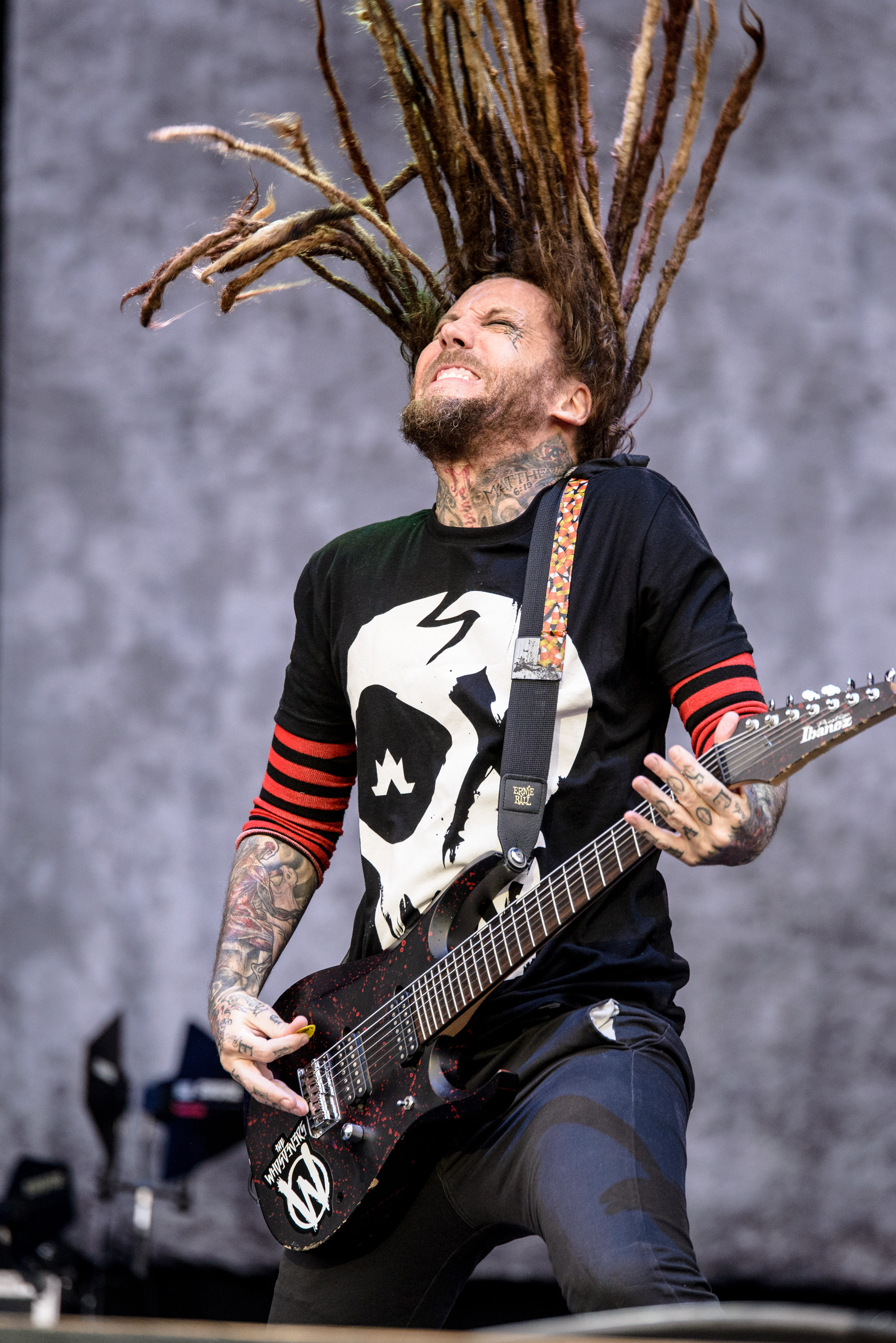
Brian "Head" Welch

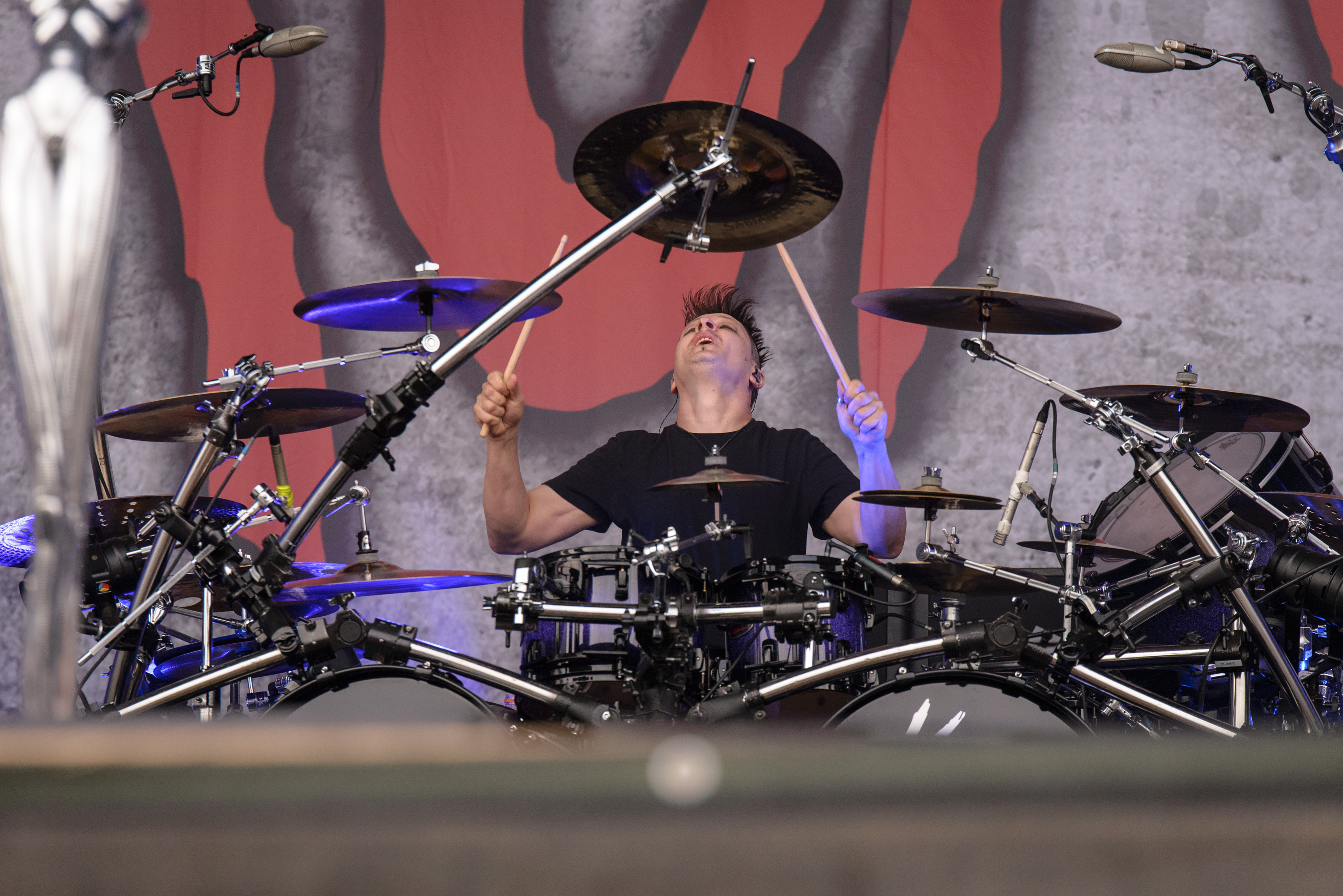
Ray Luzier

Current

- Jonathan Davis – lead vocals, bagpipes (1993–present); programming (2011–present); drums (2006–2008)
- James "Munky" Shaffer – guitar (1993–present); backing vocals (2005–present)
- Brian "Head" Welch – guitar, backing vocals (1993–2005, 2013–present)
- Ray Luzier – drums (2008–present)

Former

- Reginald "Fieldy" Arvizu – bass (1993–2021)
- David Silveria – drums, percussion (1993–2006)

Touring

- Rob Patterson – guitar, backing vocals (2005–2006; touring substitute for James Shaffer in 2008)
- Zac Baird – keyboards, backing vocals (2006–2016)
- Michael Jochum – percussion (2006–2007); drums (2007; touring substitute for Ray Luzier in 2008)
- Kalen Chase – percussion, backing vocals (2006–2008)
- Clint Lowery – guitar (2007)
- Brooks Wackerman – drums (2007)
- Joey Jordison – drums (2007; died 2021)
- Shane Gibson – guitar (2007–2010; died 2014)
- Wesley Geer – guitar (2010–2013)
- Davey Oberlin – keyboards (2017–present)
- Roberto "Ra" Díaz – bass (2021–present)

Touring substitutes

- Mike Bordin – drums (2000–2001; substituted for David Silveria)
- Christian Olde Wolbers – guitar (2006; substituted for Rob Patterson)
- Morgan Rose – drums (2011; substituted for Ray Luzier)
- Ryan Martinie – bass (2012; substituted for Reginald Arvizu)
- JR Bareis – guitar, backing vocals (substituted for Brian Welch in 2014; 2019, 2021, 2022 substituted James Shaffer)
- Abel Vallejo – drums (2015; substituted for Ray Luzier)
- Tye Trujillo – bass (2017; substituted for Reginald Arvizu)
- Aric Improta – drums (2021; substituted for Ray Luzier)

Official band members timeline

Touring musicians timeline

== Discography ==
- Korn (1994)
- Life Is Peachy (1996)
- Follow the Leader (1998)
- Issues (1999)
- Untouchables (2002)
- Take a Look in the Mirror (2003)
- See You on the Other Side (2005)
- Untitled (2007)
- Korn III: Remember Who You Are (2010)
- The Path of Totality (2011)
- The Paradigm Shift (2013)
- The Serenity of Suffering (2016)
- The Nothing (2019)
- Requiem (2022)

== See also ==
- List of nu metal bands

== Bibliography ==
- Arnopp, Jason (2001). Slipknot: Inside the Sickness, Behind the Masks. Ebury. ISBN 0-09-187933-7.
- Arvizu, Reginald (March 10, 2009). Got the Life: My Journey of Addiction, Faith, Recovery, and Korn. William Morrow. ISBN 978-0-06-166249-2.
- McIver, Joel (2002). Nu-metal: The Next Generation of Rock & Punk. Omnibus Press. ISBN 0-7119-9209-6.
- Paquet, Sebastien (May 1, 2002). Korn de A à Z [Korn from A to Z]. MusicBook guides (in French) (1st ed.). Paris: Prélude et Fugue. ISBN 978-2-843-43101-2.
- Small, Doug (1998). Korn. Omnibus Press. ISBN 0-8256-1688-3.
