= David Silveria =

American drummer (born 1972)

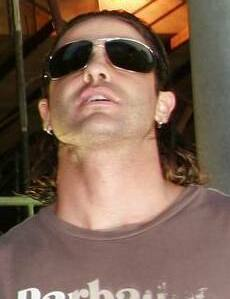
- Silveria in 2006

Background information
- Born: David Randall Silveria; September 21, 1972 (age 54); San Leandro, California, U.S.
- Genres: Nu metal; alternative metal; funk metal
- Occupation: Musician
- Instrument: Drums
- Years active: 1989–2006; 2012–2022
- Formerly of: Korn; L.A.P.D.; Infinika; Breaking in a Sequence
- Spouse: Shannon Bellino (div.)

David Randall Silveria (born September 21, 1972) is an American musician, best known as the original drummer for nu metal band Korn from 1993 until leaving the band in 2006. He then became the drummer for Infinika, which was formed in 2012 and disbanded in 2015.

== History ==
=== 1993–2006: Korn ===
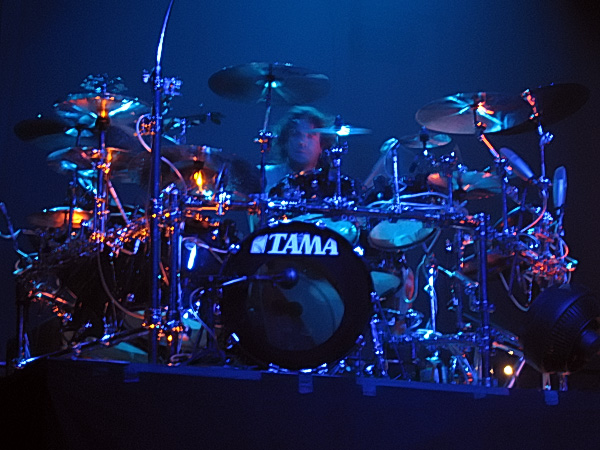
Silveria performing with Korn in 2005

Born in San Leandro, California, Silveria was raised in Bakersfield and attended South High School. He was one of the original five members of the nu metal band Korn, alongside Brian "Head" Welch, James "Munky" Shaffer, Reginald "Fieldy" Arvizu, and Jonathan Davis. Korn proceeded to popularize the nu metal subgenre in the music industry, selling over 40 million albums worldwide. Silveria sat out a part of the "Sick and Twisted 2000" and "Summer Sanitarium" tours due to injury, with Mike Bordin from Faith No More filling in on drums. Silveria then returned for the album recording of Untouchables, Silveria's own explanation for the issue was that he "hits too fucking hard".

On December 13, 2006, after the tour in support of See You on the Other Side, it was announced that Silveria would be going on hiatus, and Jonathan Davis later said Silveria would "probably not" appear on their next album. In 2009, after working with several different temporary drummers, Ray Luzier was announced as the official replacement.

=== 2006–2012: Leaving Korn and hiatus ===
For the first time in three years, Silveria made an appearance, promoting Lil' Kim in Dancing with the Stars; he also introduced himself as "David Silveria from Korn". In May 2010, he appeared as a model for Remetee clothing.

==== Comments on Korn since leaving ====
Since January 2012, Silveria has become vocal about his time in Korn, and has often spoken negatively about the band, its members and in some cases its outspoken fans, during conversations on Korn fansite Kornspace.com. Although he maintains no relationship with his former bandmates, he has stated that he has no hard feelings towards guitarist James Shaffer. However, Silveria has spoken less fondly of singer Jonathan Davis and bassist Reginald Arvizu, such as calling Arvizu a "cowardly little bitch". Silveria states that his relationship with Korn was flawed due to them not letting him back in the band after his long absence from music. Silveria mentioned during his conversation with fans on Kornspace that he had contacted then-former band member Brian Welch about a Korn reunion tour but Welch refused the offer. Silveria also confirmed his comments that he left Korn due to "negative attitudes" and that he "couldn't take it anymore". He mentioned at that point that he had not spoken with Davis since November 2006. However, after it was announced that original guitarist Welch would be returning to Korn for two shows at Rock am Ring and Rock im Park in 2013, Silveria commented on his Facebook page that he would be open to a reunion if all five original members were involved.

On January 7, 2013, Silveria updated his status on his official Facebook page stating, 'Korn fans need to flood the Korn site telling them Korn isn't Korn without the original five!!!' He then went on to say in a later status that fans should 'Flood Jd's and Munkys twitter to bring the original 5 back together" and later commenting that he had 'made contact', after which fans began predicting that a full reunion would happen. On January 7, 2013, Welch stated in an interview that "David has really said some crazy things online about personal things and he's not in a place where people would really want him around. That happened before I talked with them but I guess the things he said were really crazy. Those guys were in a band together for so long so I don't know, but for now it's just not going to happen."

On August 11, 2013, Silveria took to his personal Facebook account to state that "[t]here are a lot of things I did for the band that they don't like to admit I did." He then went on to say in a later post that he blamed the band's "cookie cutter" musical direction after Follow the Leader for his lack of interest from that point. On August 17, 2013, Silveria responded to the repeated misquoting of his post on Ray Luzier and Korn with "To be clear I am NOT talking bad about Ray. My posts have been about my work with Korn during our early years specifically during our first three records." Silveria has claimed that he could restore Korn's original sound, and says that he would like to have a discussion with the band about their early days, the future of the band and Korn's original sound. However, Davis stated on Twitter that "I will never never play with him again" (which appears to be a reference to the title of Korn's first single "Never Never" from the album The Paradigm Shift).

In February 2015, Silveria stated that he was suing his former bandmates in Korn for money owed after the band declined to allow him back in the group following a lengthy break. According to TMZ, Silveria is suing the other four original band members in an effort to reclaim the money owed to him and his "ownership interest" in the band since his departure. If Silveria is paid what he believes he is owed from the past 9 years, he will dissolve his partnership with the group.

=== 2012–2015: Infinika ===
On January 24, it was announced on YouTube that Silveria was playing drums for the experimental rock band Infinika alongside the founding member of ANYONE (and filmmaker) Riz Story. On January 27, it was confirmed with an article on Blabbermouth.net. Silveria stated that he wished to expand his musical scope with Infinika adding that it was technically the most advanced drumming of his career. On January 30, fan site Kornspace.com confirmed that Silveria had in fact joined the site, with a picture of Silveria holding a Kornspace banner. This confirmed previous comments that had supposedly been made by the drummer on the site earlier that week. Silveria stated that he would be touring with Infinika and that he was looking forward to the release of the first full-length album by the band, Echoes and Traces.

On April 2, Infinika released a single and music video via YouTube called "Beautiful World". The video features footage of Silveria recorded for the Infinika – Promotional Clip.

The album Echoes and Traces was released worldwide in September 2014. It features 14 tracks which vary widely from acoustic to psychedelic metal. Silveria stated that "the direction of the band would be defined by its rich mixture of sounds and unpredictable direction". Noting the mixed reviews from some Korn fans Silveria stated, "I have no interest in repeating myself. I want to keep expanding my drumming and Infinika allows me to explore the wide range of my drumming".

On January 24, 2015, Infinika announced the band would be dissolved. The following year, Story claimed on Facebook that Silveria did not perform on Echoes and Traces, and that the album had already been completed when "attaching silveria [sic] to it seemed like a good 'business' move at the time." Story also stated that Silveria had been kicked out of the band due to political disagreements between the two, including Silveria's support for Donald Trump.

=== 2016–2018: Core 10 and Breaking in a Sequence (B.I.A.S.) ===
In March 2017, Silveria joined Core 10, a metal and hard rock band. On May 22, 2018, it was announced that Core 10 had broken up. Silveria and several other former Core 10 members then started a new band, Breaking in a Sequence (B.I.A.S). In July 2022, Breaking in a Sequence announced that Silveria had left the band, attributing his decision to wanting to spend time with family.

== Personal life ==
Silveria married Shannon Bellino in 1997 but the couple divorced a few years later; they have two children together, born in 1997 and 1999. Silveria later married Victoria Silveria; the couple currently reside in Huntington Beach, California.

On March 25, 2012, David Silveria was arrested in Huntington Beach for driving under the influence. He said that he had taken a sleeping pill, and that he was not under the influence. He had been out socializing with friends and family, including his wife, the night before at 2nd Floor Bar.

== Discography ==
With L.A.P.D

- James Brown (also known as Love and Peace Dude EP) (1989)
- Who's Laughing Now (1991)
- L.A.P.D (1997)

With Korn

- Korn (1994)
- Life Is Peachy (1996)
- Follow the Leader (1998)
- Issues (1999)
- Untouchables (2002)
- Take a Look in the Mirror (2003)
- See You on the Other Side (2005)

With Infinika

- Echoes and Traces (2014)

With Breaking in a Sequence

- Acronym EP (2021)
- Defy the Algorithm EP (2022)

== See also ==
- LAPD
- Korn
- List of Korn band members
