= List of songs recorded by Korn =

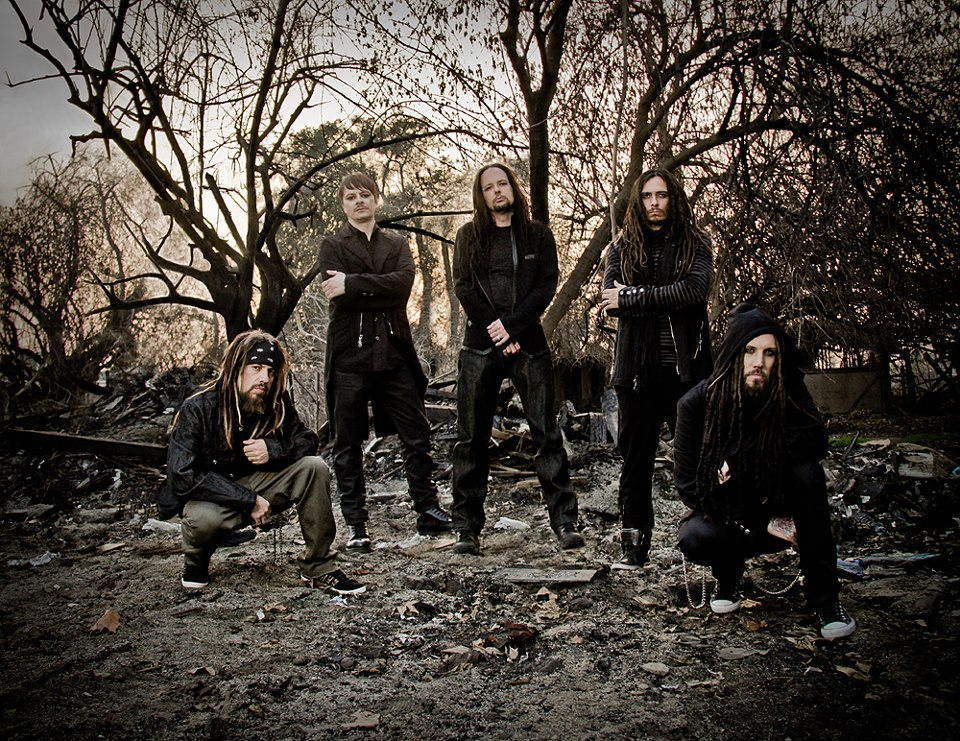
The current lineup of Korn, from left to right: Reginald "Fieldy" Arvizu, Ray Luzier, Jonathan Davis, James "Munky" Shaffer and Brian "Head" Welch.

Korn is an American nu metal band from Bakersfield, California. Formed in 1993, the band originally featured vocalist Jonathan Davis, guitarists James "Munky" Shaffer and Brian "Head" Welch, bassist Reginald "Fieldy" Arvizu, and drummer David Silveria. The current lineup of the group includes drummer Ray Luzier, who replaced Silveria in 2009. The band released its self-titled debut album Korn in 1994, which was produced by Ross Robinson and featured equal songwriting credits for the whole band. Life Is Peachy, released in 1996, included two cover versions – of Ice Cube's "Wicked" and War's "Lowrider", while the band's third album Follow the Leader featured collaborations with Limp Bizkit's Fred Durst ("All in the Family") and rappers Ice Cube ("Children of the Korn") and Slimkid3 ("Cameltosis").

Following the release of Korn's next three albums – 1999's Issues, 2002's Untouchables and 2003's Take a Look in the Mirror – all of which featured equal songwriting credits for all five band members, Welch left the group in 2005 due to his "newfound Christian faith". The previous year, the band had released Greatest Hits Vol. 1, which featured recordings of Cameo's "Word Up!" and Pink Floyd's "Another Brick in the Wall". Korn returned as a quartet in 2005 with See You on the Other Side, which co-credited producers The Matrix and Atticus Ross on many tracks. After Silveria left in 2007, Brooks Wackerman and Terry Bozzio performed drums on the band's 2007 untitled eighth studio album, which also featured keyboardist Zac Baird who was credited for songwriting on many of the album's songs.

After filling in for the departed Silveria on the untitled album's touring cycle, Ray Luzier joined as Korn's full-time drummer in 2009, first contributing to the band's 2010 album Korn III: Remember Who You Are, which returned to crediting the band for songwriting. The band's next album, 2011's The Path of Totality, saw a drastic shift in musical style into electronic music, particularly dubstep, including collaborations with Skrillex, Noisia, Excision and more. Original guitarist Brian "Head" Welch rejoined the band in 2013, returning for The Paradigm Shift which co-credited producer Don Gilmore for songwriting. The Serenity of Suffering followed in 2016.

== Songs ==
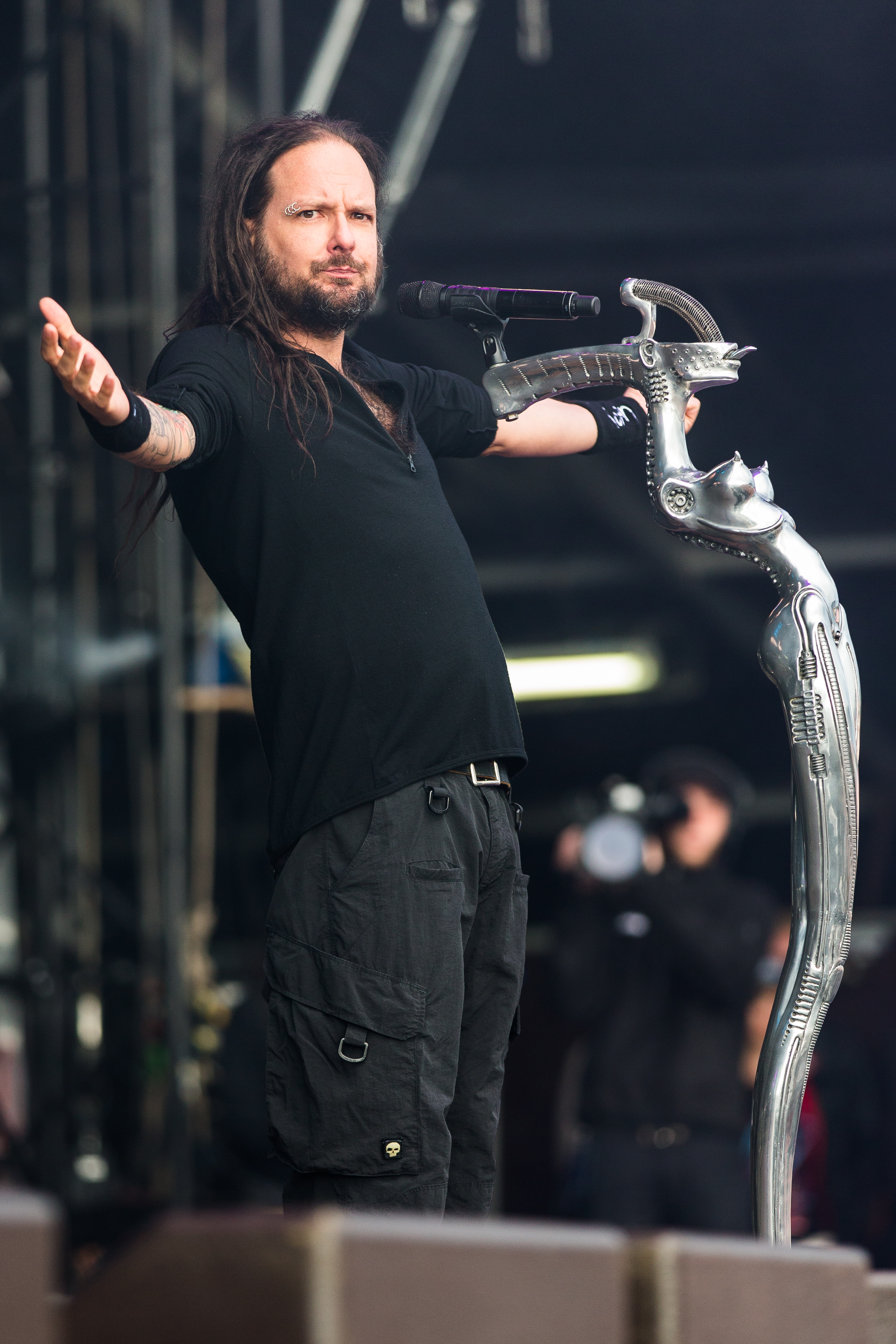
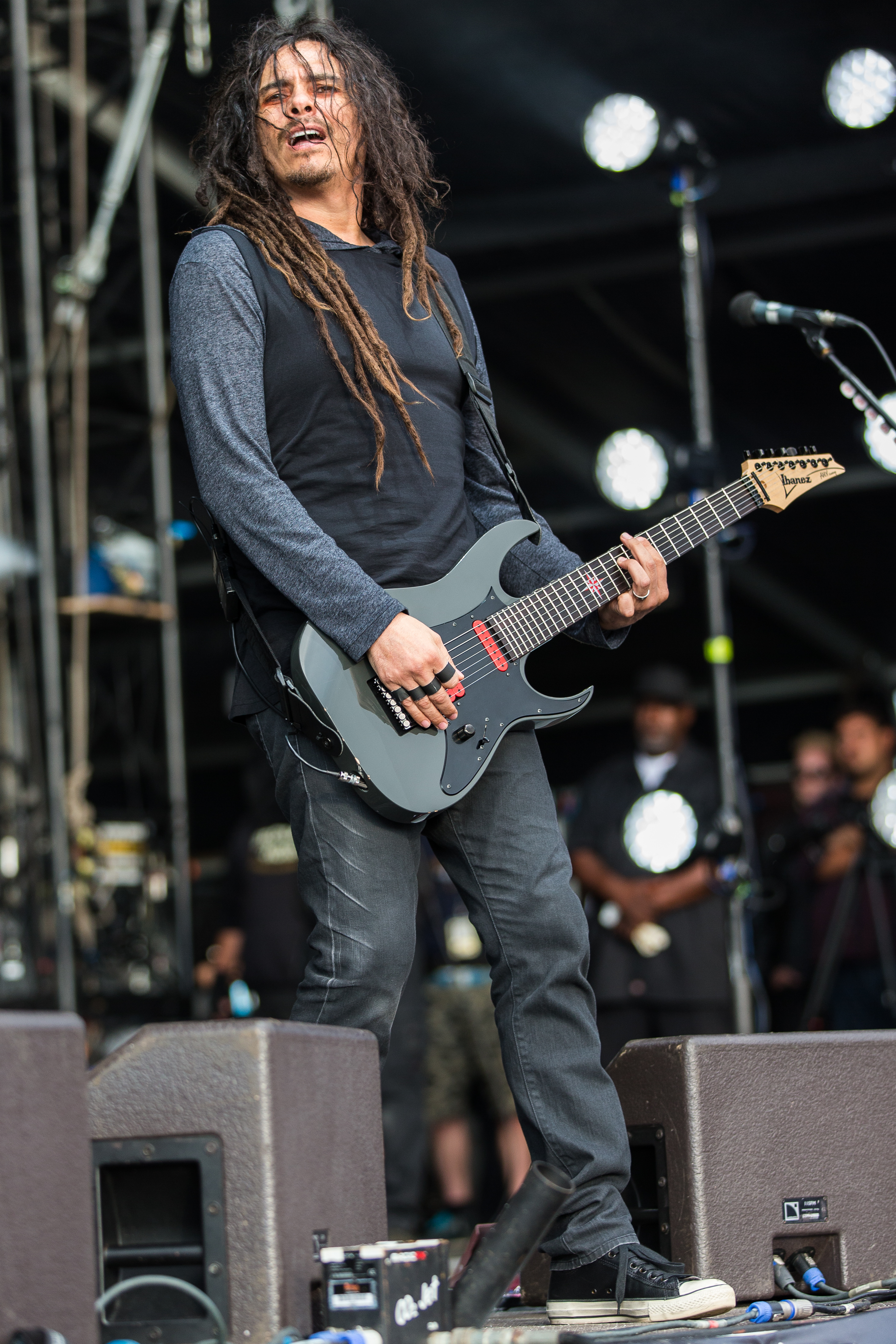
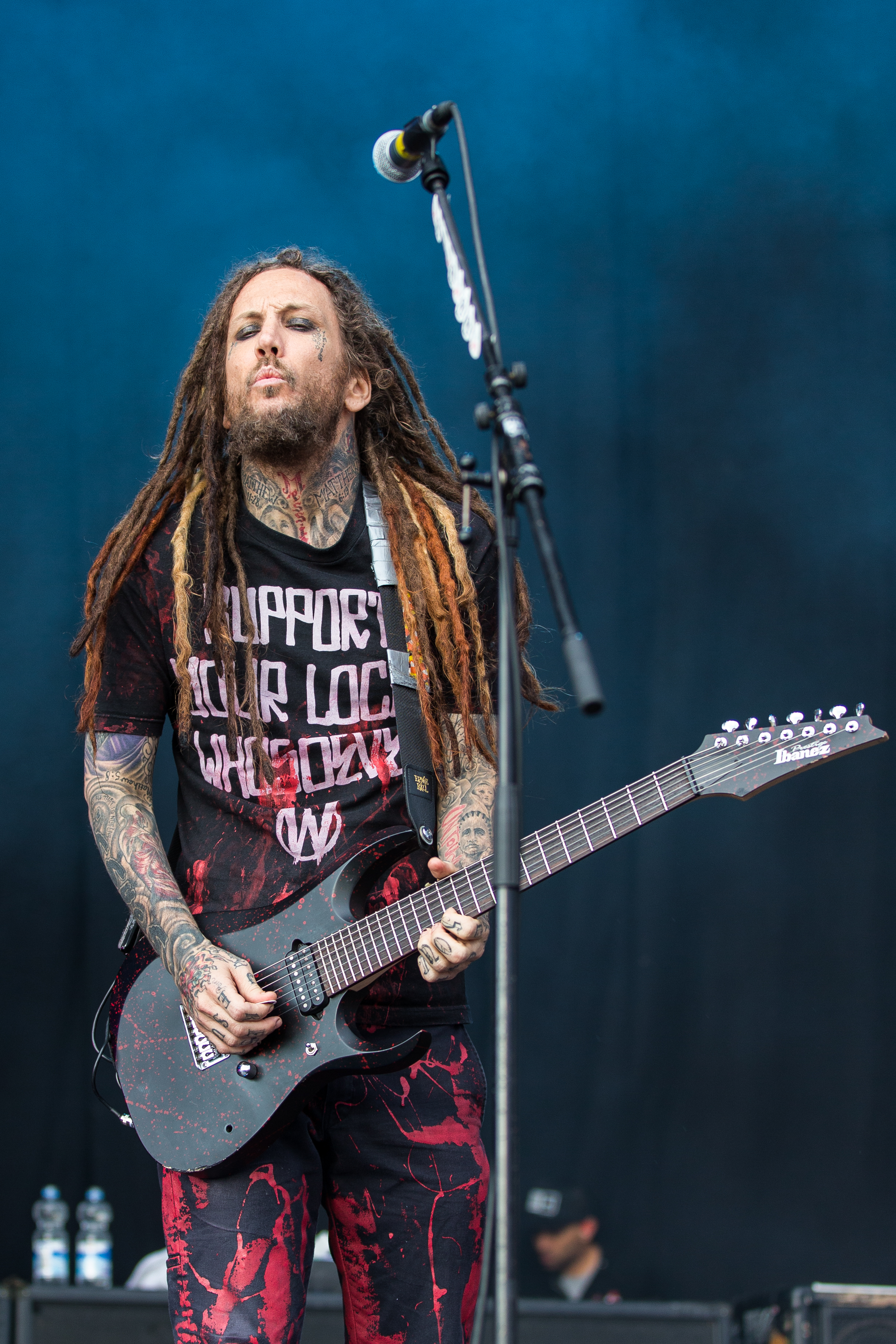
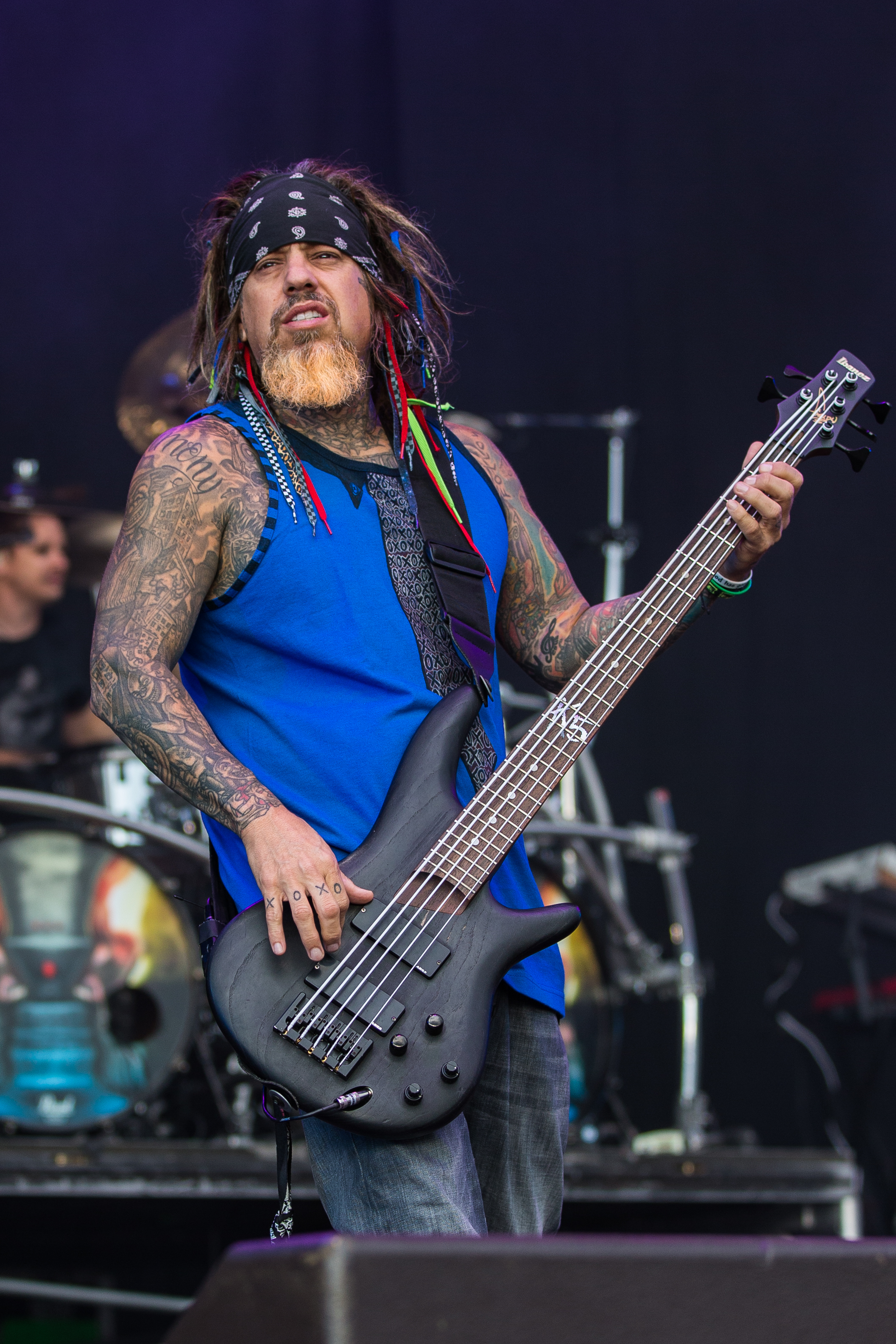
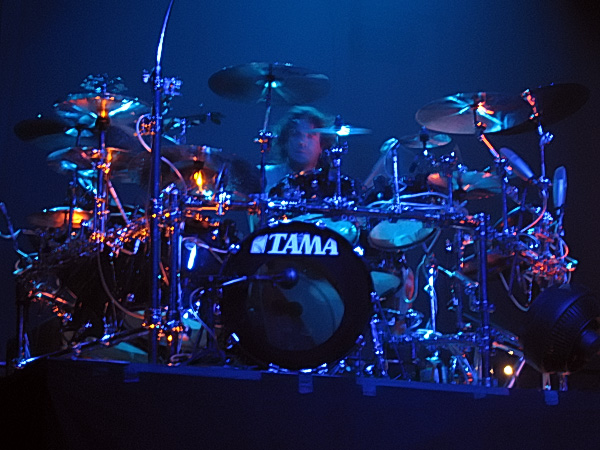
Korn was founded by (top to bottom) Jonathan Davis, James "Munky" Shaffer, Brian "Head" Welch, Reginald "Fieldy" Arvizu and David Silveria, who received collective songwriting credits.

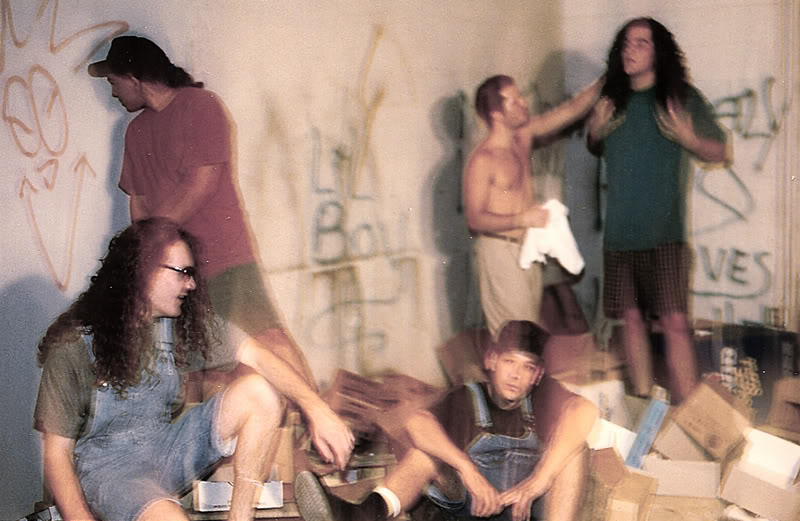
Korn's debut single "Blind" was originally written by Jonathan Davis's previous band Sexart in 1992.

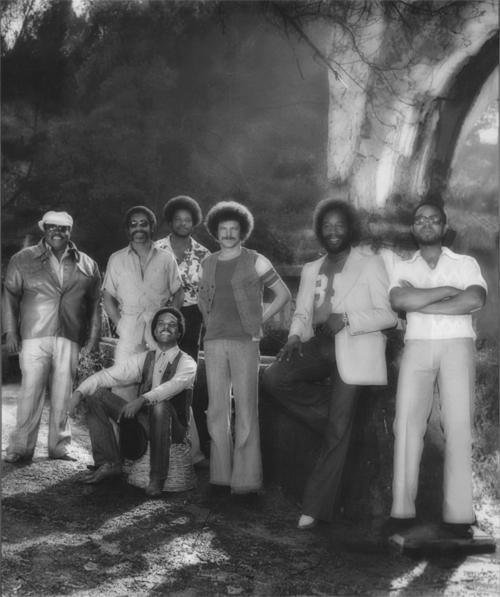
The band's second album, Life Is Peachy, featured a cover version of "Low Rider", originally by War.

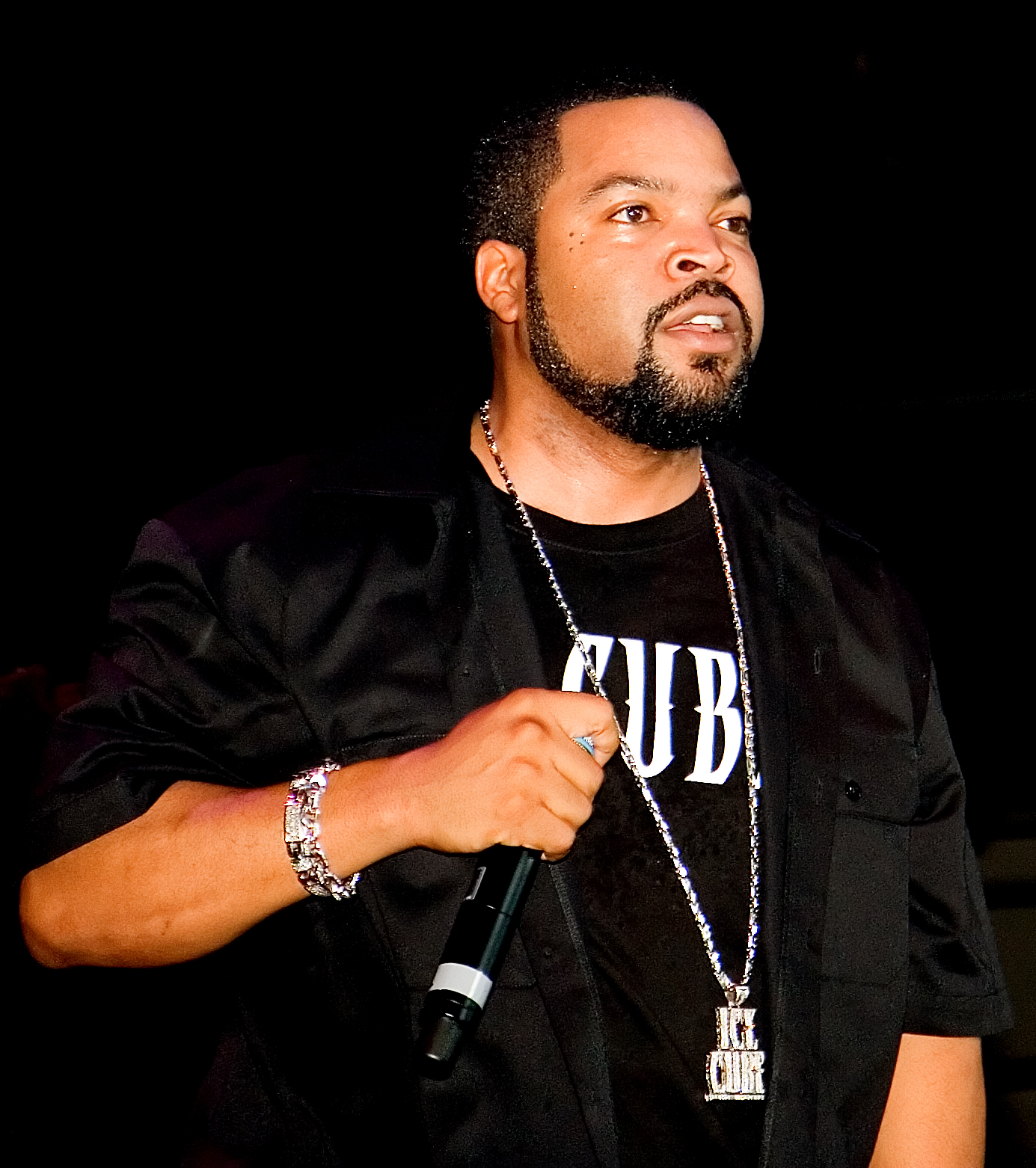
Life Is Peachy also featured a recording of Ice Cube's 1992 single "Wicked". The rapper later featured on 1998's "Children of the Korn".

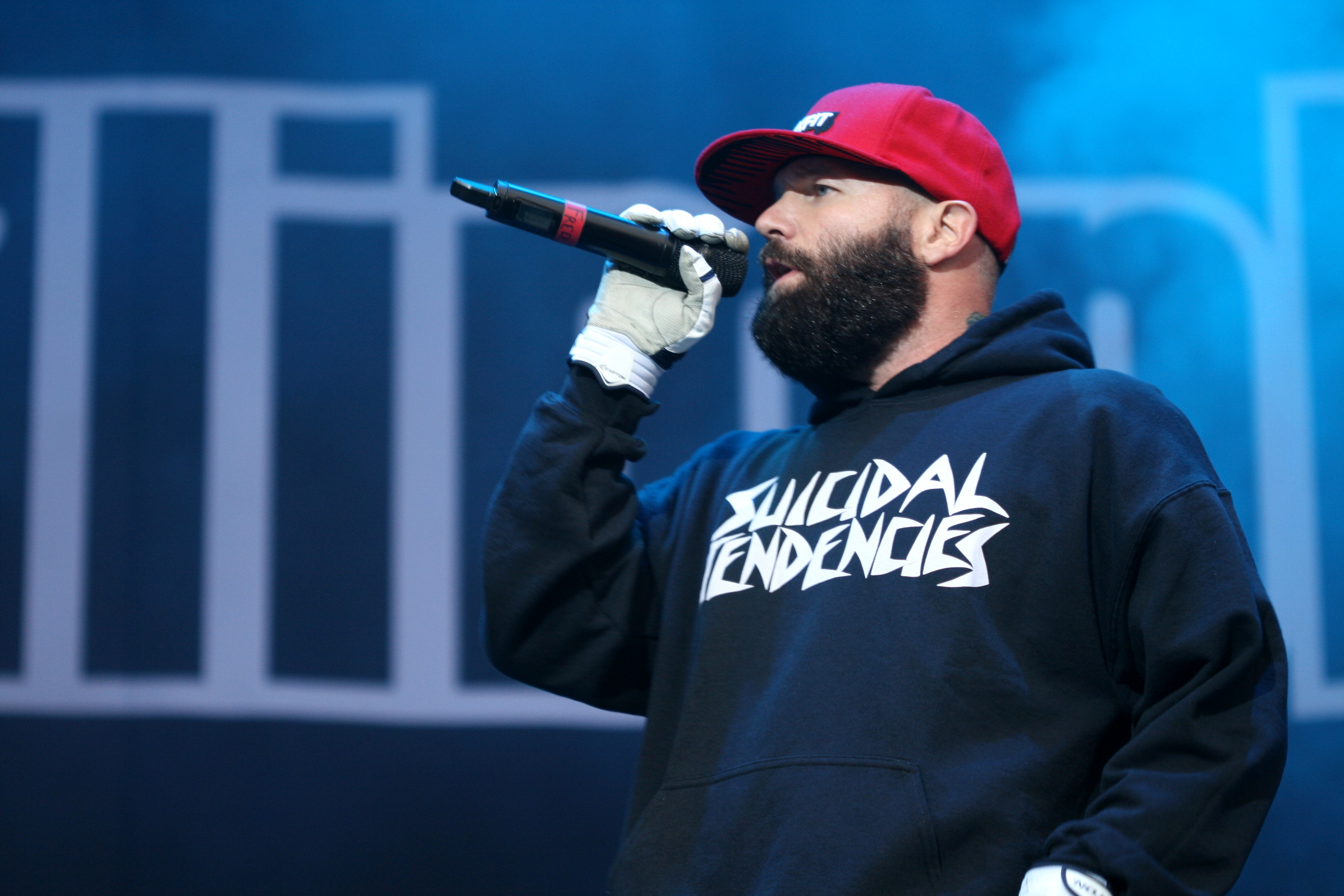
Limp Bizkit frontman Fred Durst performed additional vocals on Korn's 1998 single "All in the Family".

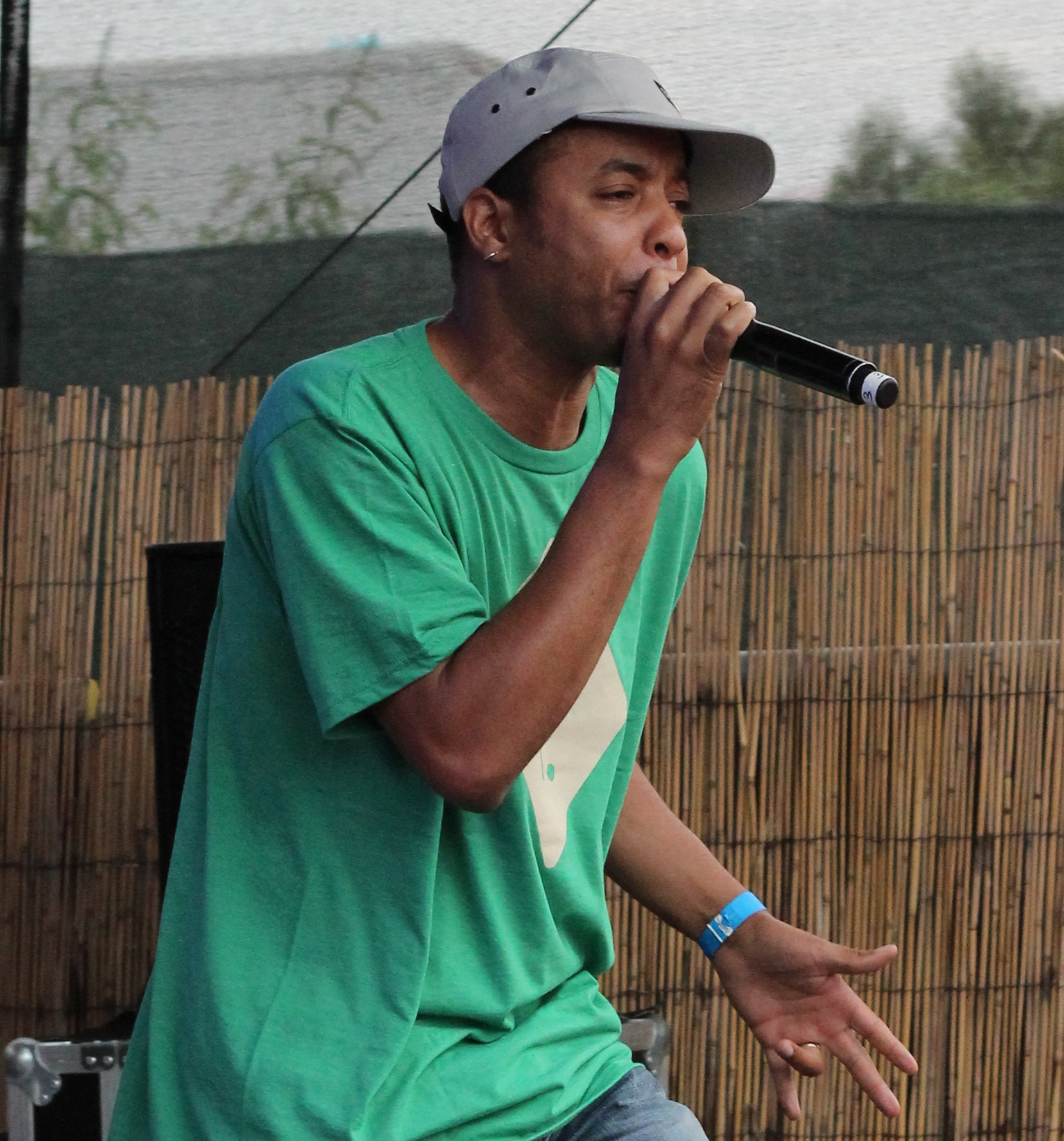
Hip hop recording artist Slimkid3 collaborated with the band on Follow the Leader track "Cameltosis".

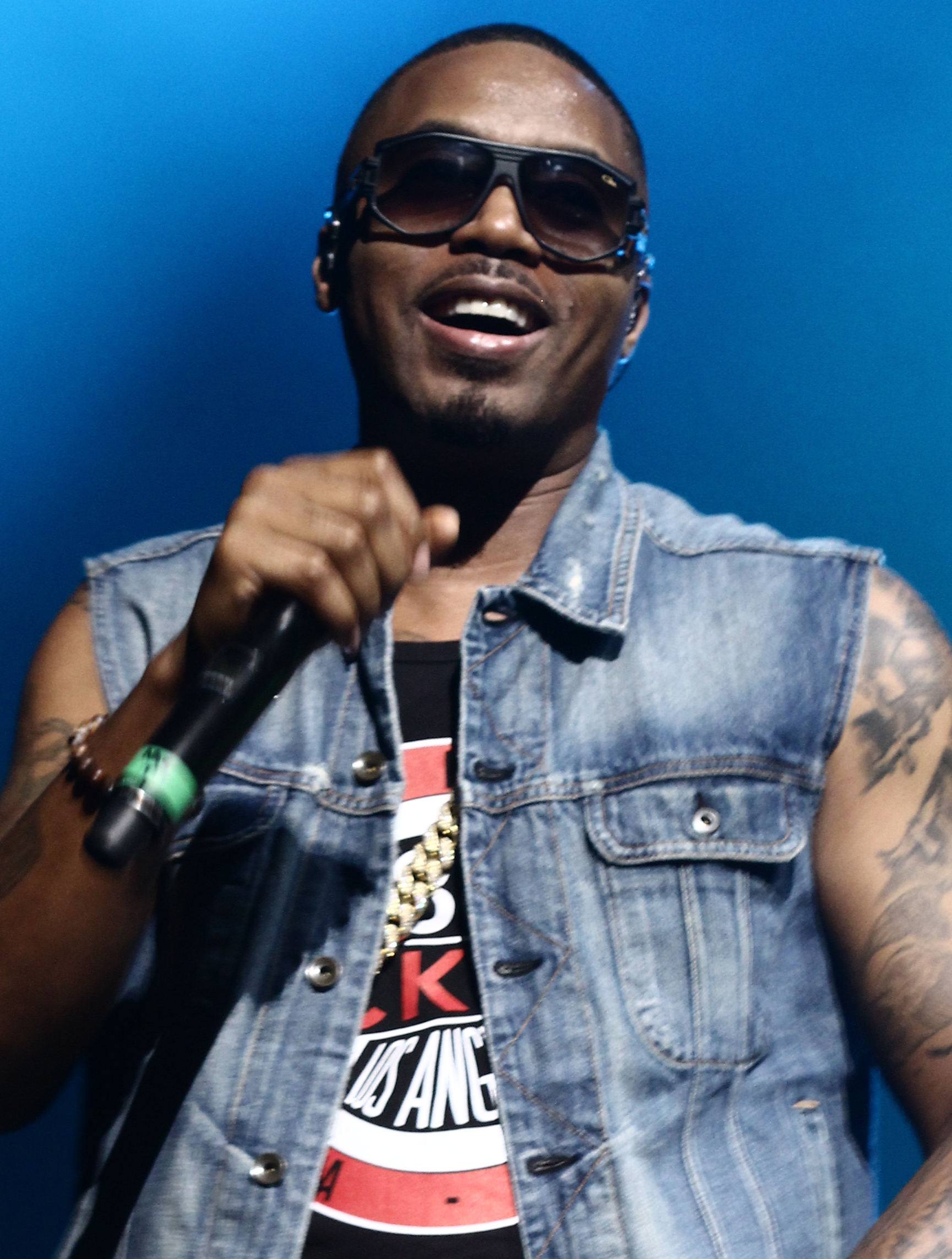
The band's song "Play Me", released in 2003 on Take a Look in the Mirror, features rapper Nas.

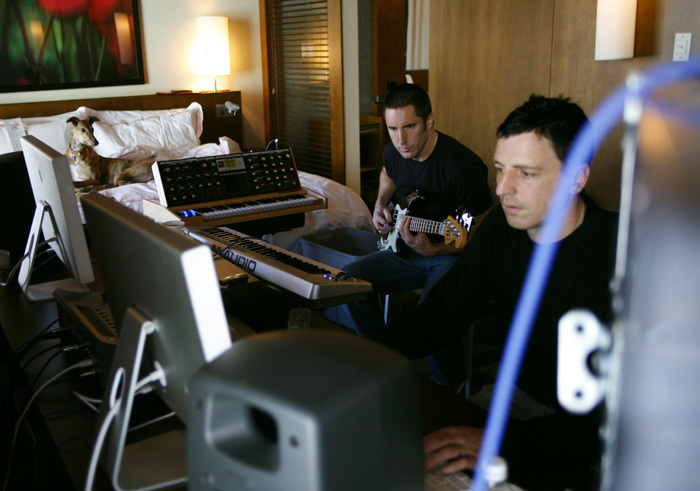
Producer Atticus Ross (right) is credited for songwriting on several tracks on 2005's See You on the Other Side and 2007's untitled album.

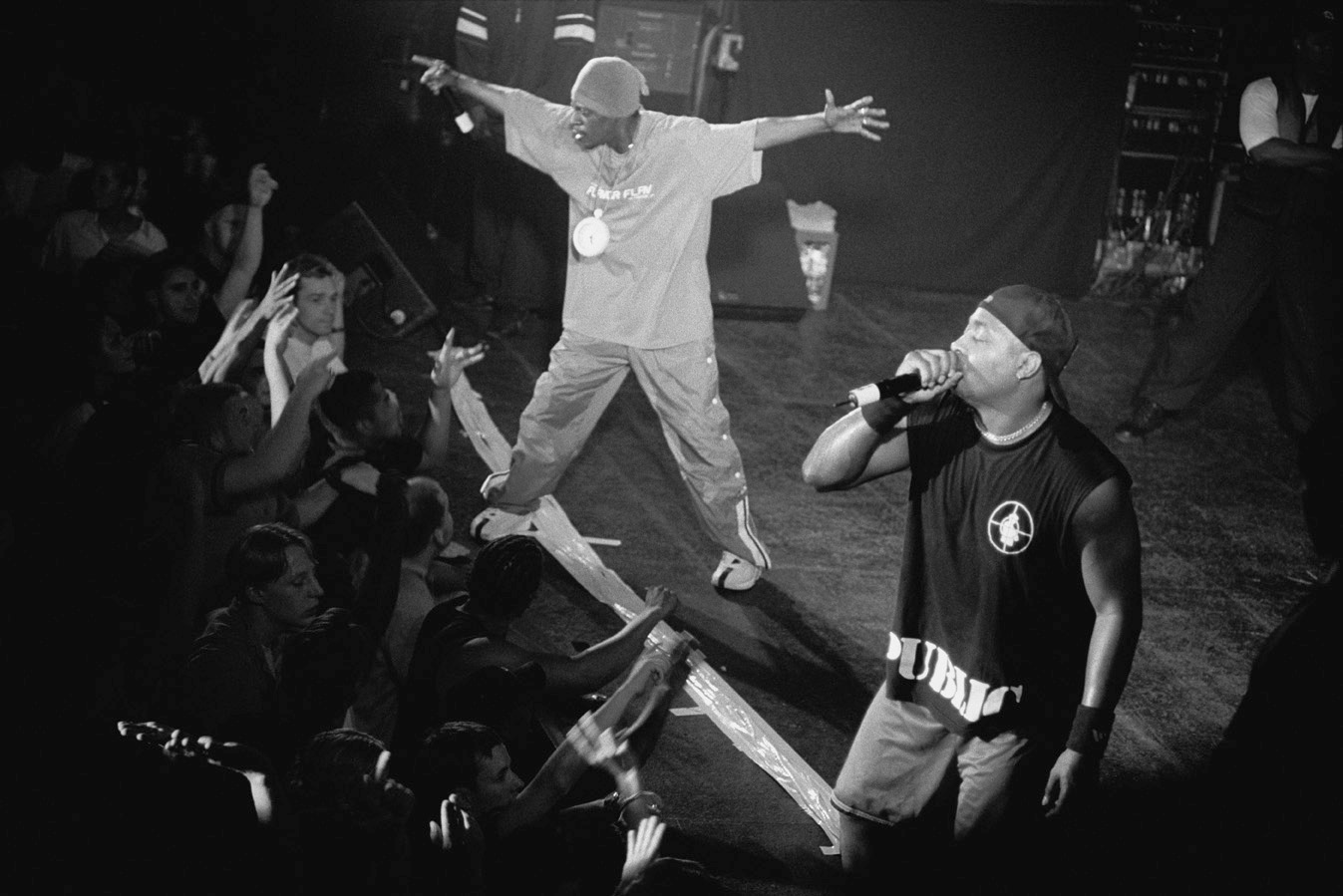
In 2005, the band released a recording of Public Enemy's 1989 single "Fight the Power".

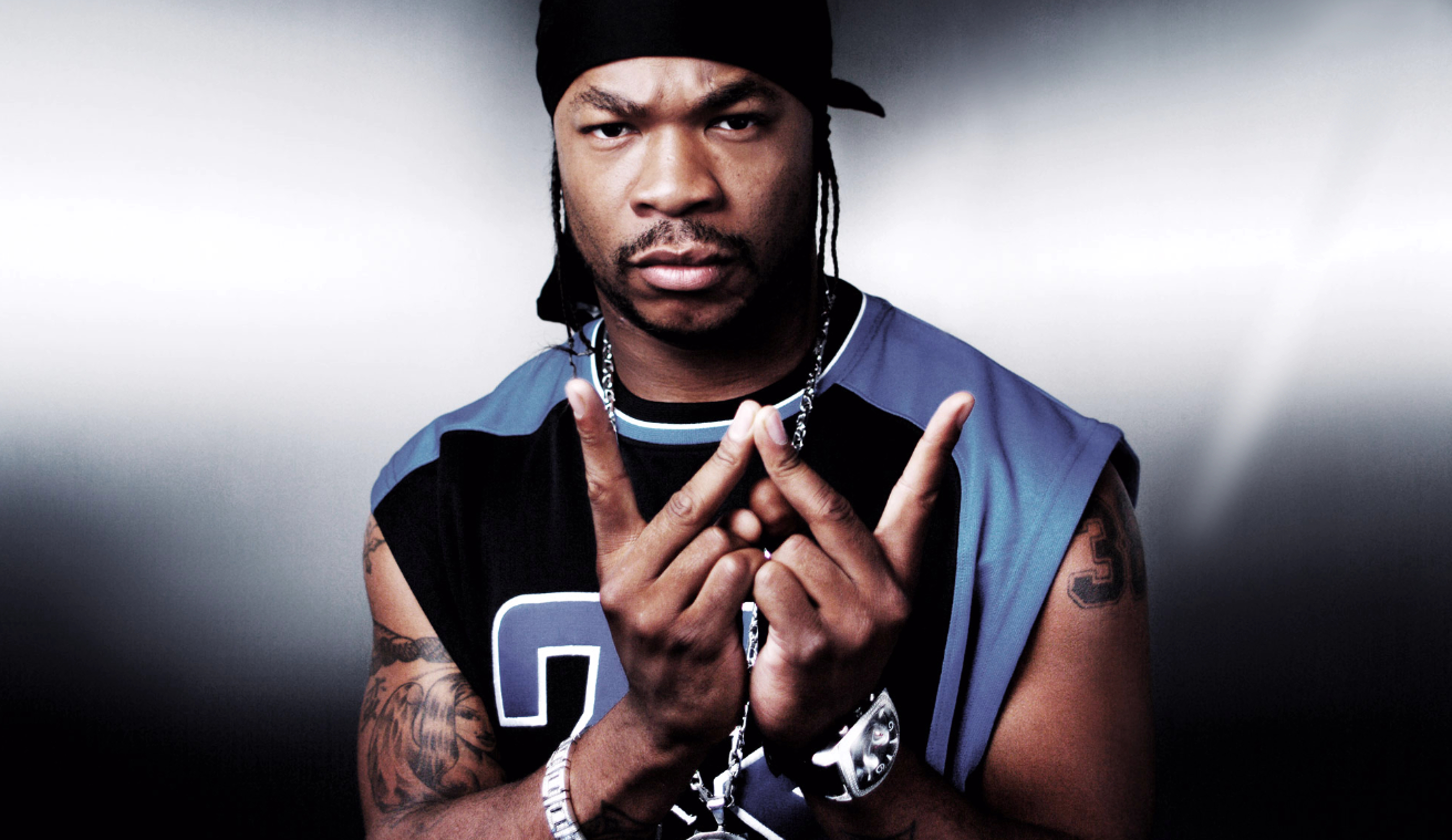
Korn's "Fight the Power" cover also featured rapper Xzibit.

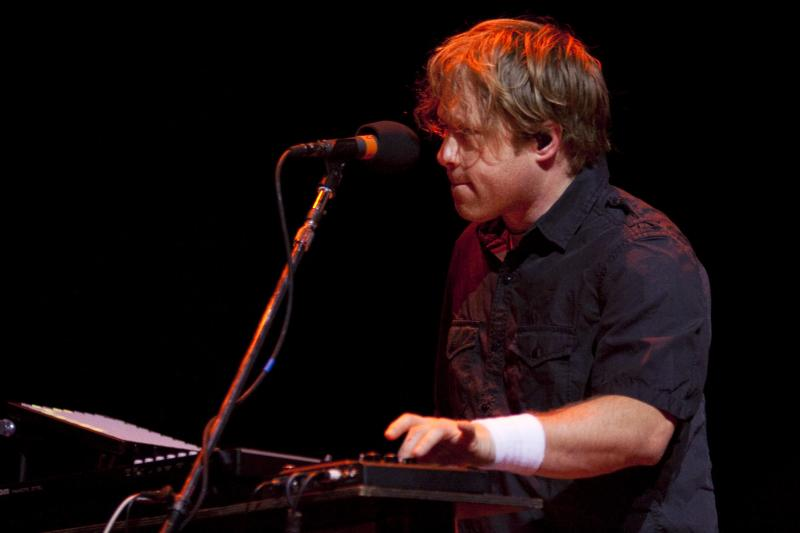
Keyboardist Zac Baird co-wrote and performed keyboards on Korn's 2007 untitled album.

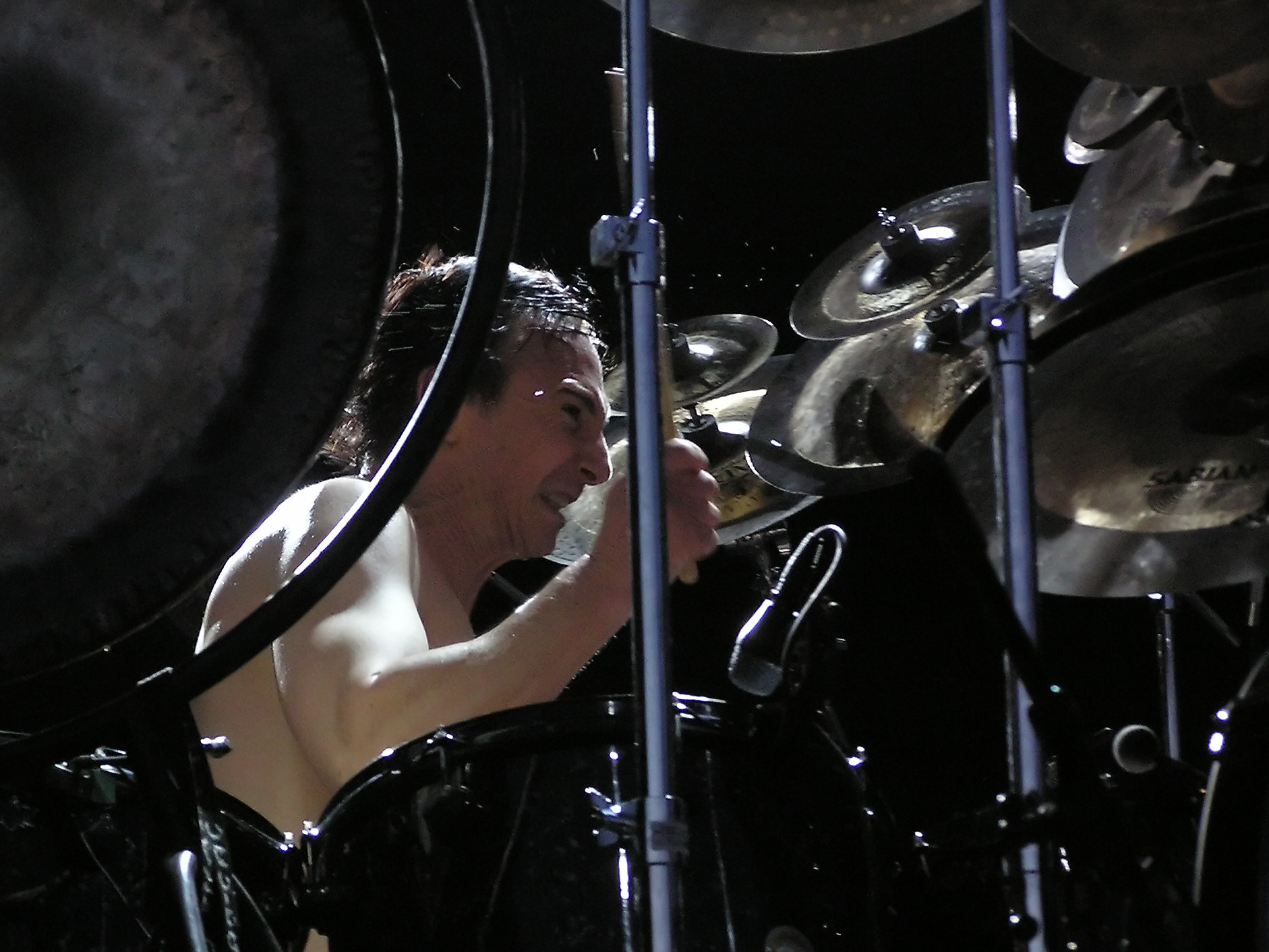
Terry Bozzio contributed drums to Korn's untitled album, and was co-credited for writing on four songs.

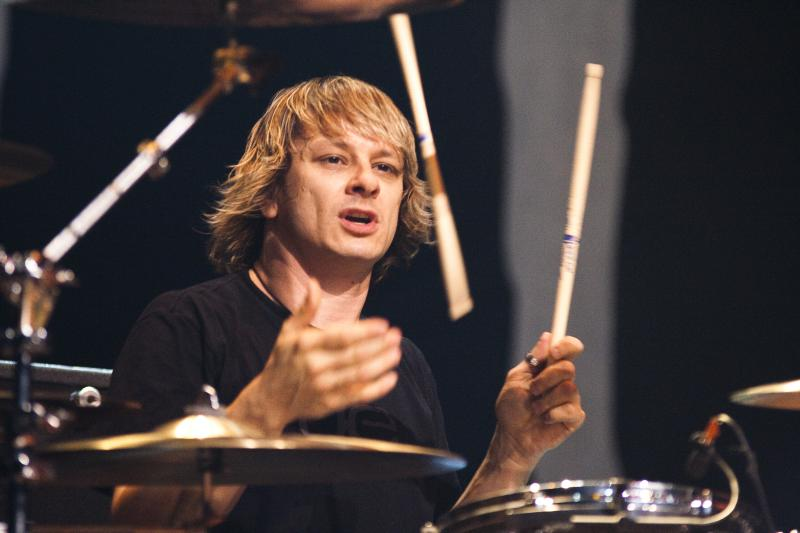
Ray Luzier joined Korn full-time in 2009, first contributing to 2010's Korn III: Remember Who You Are.

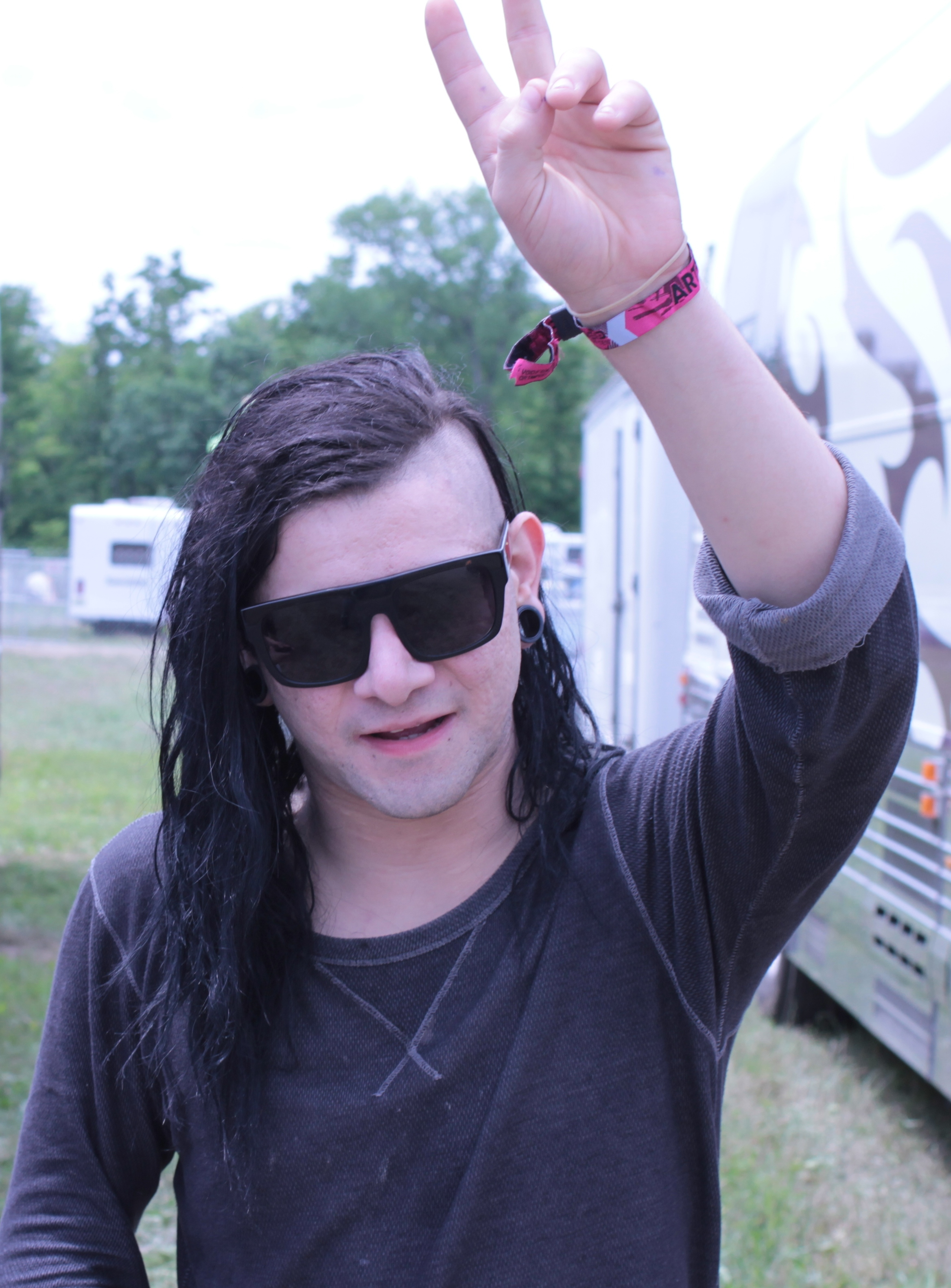
Electronic producer Skrillex co-wrote and featured on three tracks on 2011's The Path of Totality.

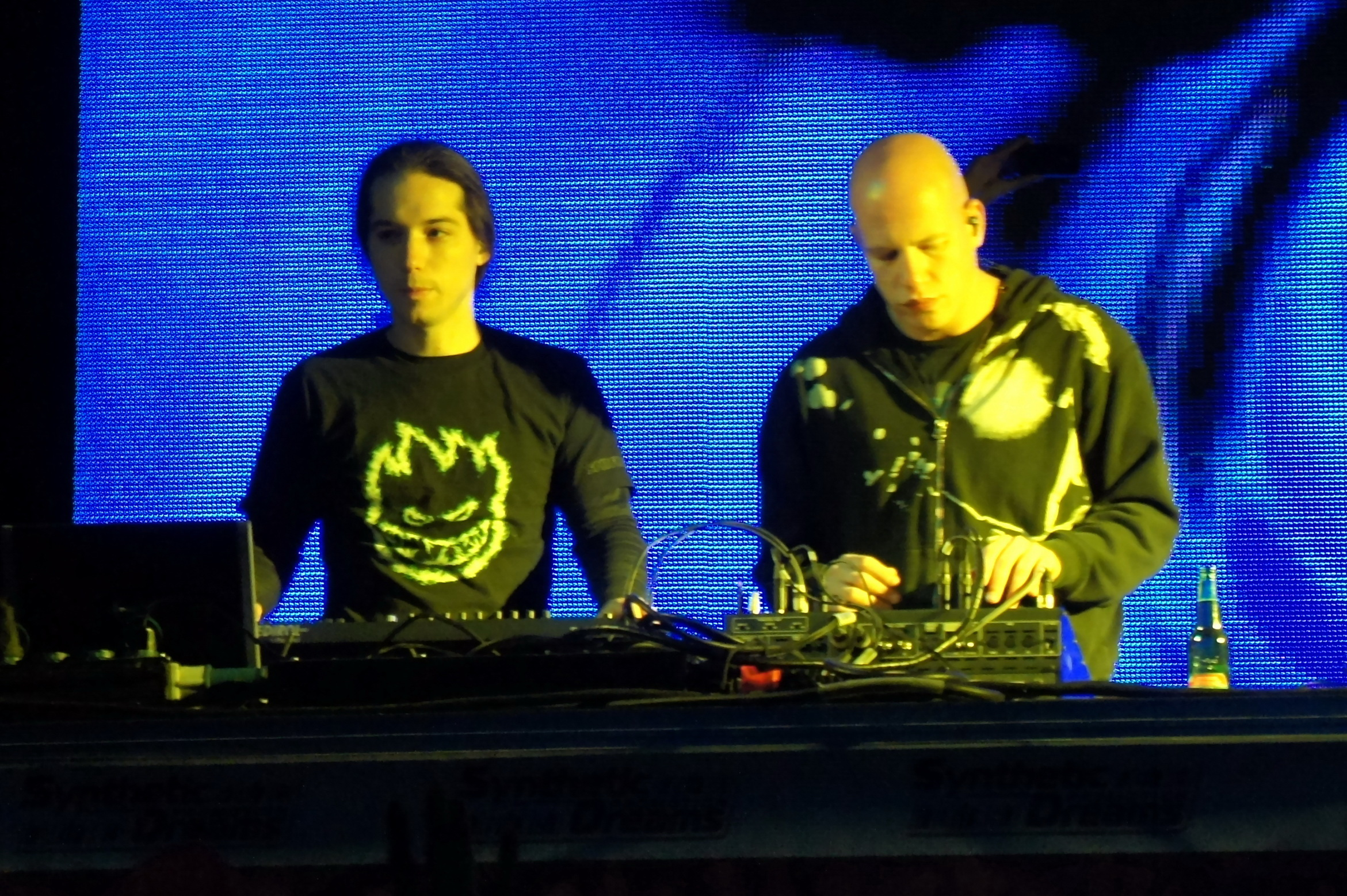
Israeli duo Infected Mushroom are featured on The Path of Totality bonus track "Tension", alongside Excision, Datsik and Downlink.

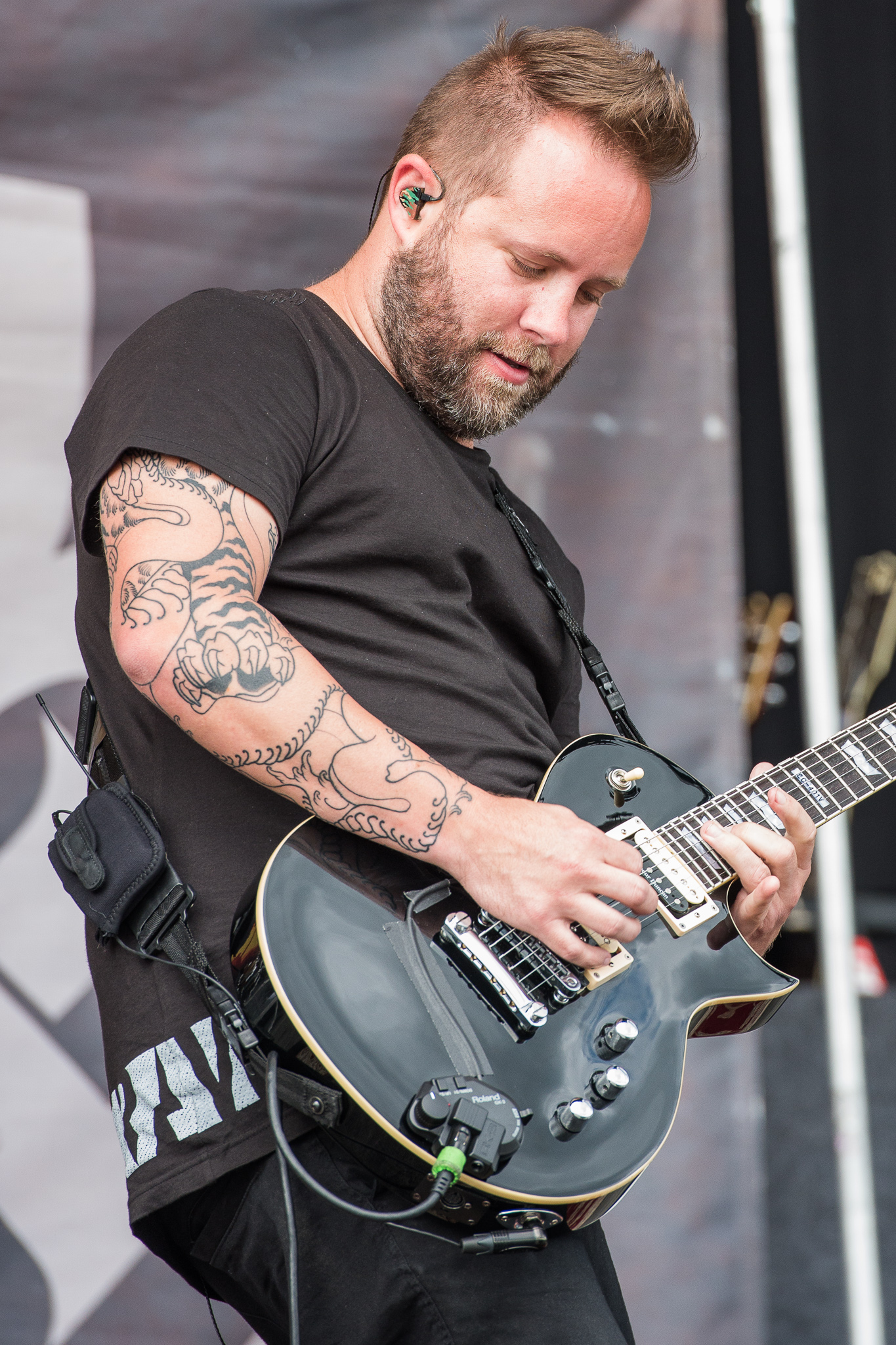
Jasen Rauch co-wrote the song "Love & Meth", released in 2013 on The Paradigm Shift.

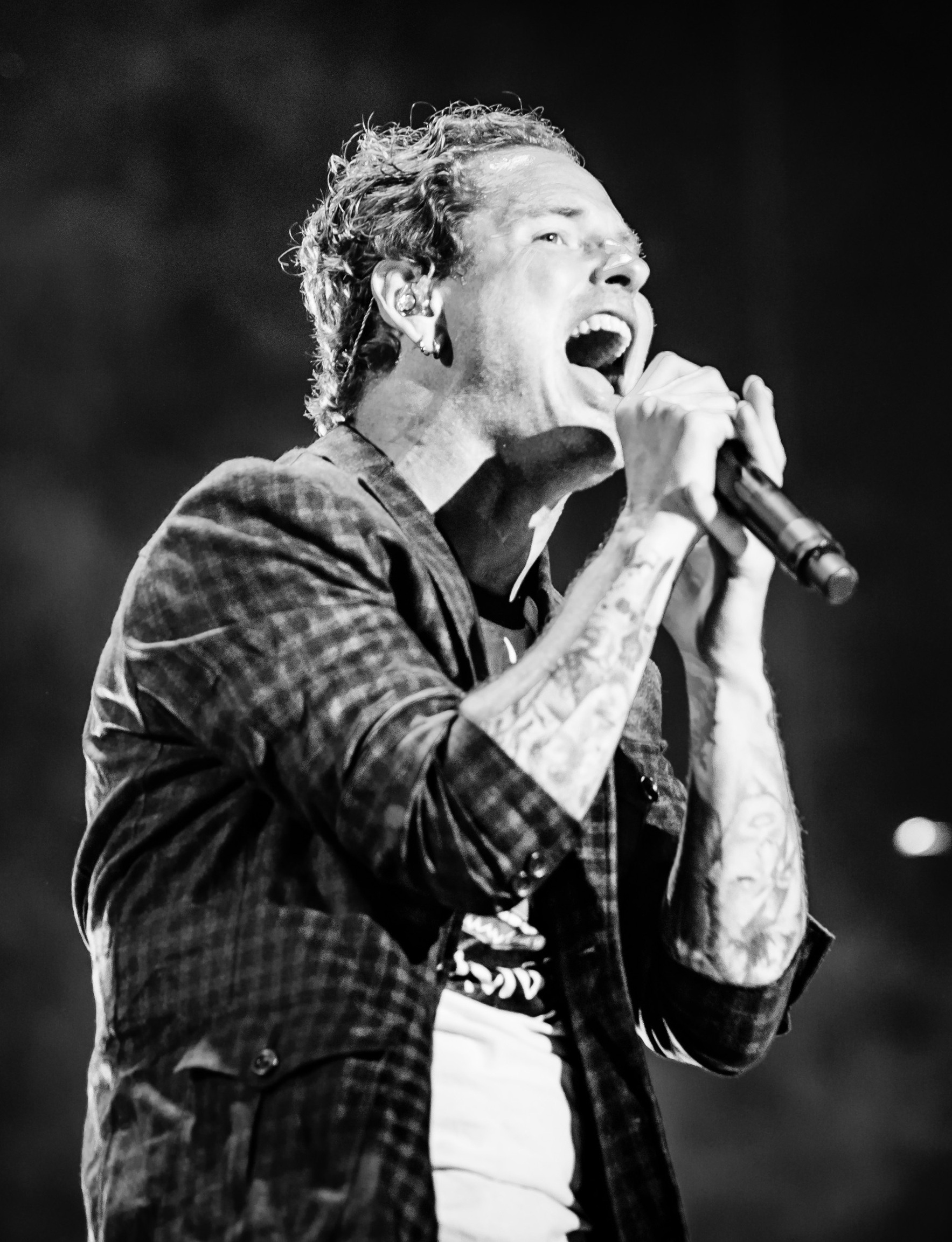
Slipknot and Stone Sour frontman Corey Taylor is featured on the 2016 song "A Different World".

Key
†	Indicates song released as a single
‡	Indicates songwriting credited to Korn

Title	Credited artist(s)	Credited writer(s)	Release	Year	Ref.	Notes
"10 or a 2-Way"	Korn	Jonathan Davis; James Shaffer; Reginald Arvizu; David Silveria; Lauren Fownes; Graham Edwards; David Alspach; Atticus Ross	See You on the Other Side	2005		
"4 U"	Korn	Jonathan Davis; James Shaffer; Brian Welch; Reginald Arvizu; David Silveria ‡	Issues	1999		
"A Different World"	Korn; Corey Taylor	Jonathan Davis; James Shaffer; Brian Welch; Reginald Arvizu; Ray Luzier ‡	The Serenity of Suffering	2016		
"A.D.I.D.A.S." †	Korn	Jonathan Davis; James Shaffer; Brian Welch; Reginald Arvizu; David Silveria ‡	Life Is Peachy	1996		
"Alive"	Korn	Jonathan Davis; James Shaffer; Brian Welch; Reginald Arvizu; David Silveria ‡	Take a Look in the Mirror	2003		
"All in the Family" †	Korn; Fred Durst	Jonathan Davis; James Shaffer; Brian Welch; Reginald Arvizu; David Silveria; Fred Durst	Follow the Leader	1998		
"Alone I Break" †	Korn	Jonathan Davis; James Shaffer; Brian Welch; Reginald Arvizu; David Silveria ‡	Untouchables	2002		
"Am I Going Crazy"	Korn	Jonathan Davis; James Shaffer; Brian Welch; Reginald Arvizu; David Silveria ‡	Issues	1999		
"Another Brick in the Wall" †	Korn	Roger Waters	Greatest Hits Vol. 1	2004		(Note: "Another Brick in the Wall" was originally recorded by Pink Floyd.)
"Appears"	Korn	Jonathan Davis; James Shaffer; Reginald Arvizu; David Silveria; Lauren Fownes; Graham Edwards; David Alspach	"Twisted Transistor"	2005		
"Are You Ready to Live?"	Korn	Jonathan Davis; James Shaffer; Reginald Arvizu; Ray Luzier ‡	Korn III: Remember Who You Are	2010		
"Ass Itch"	Korn	Jonathan Davis; James Shaffer; Brian Welch; Reginald Arvizu; David Silveria ‡	Life Is Peachy	1996		
"B.B.K." †	Korn	Jonathan Davis; James Shaffer; Brian Welch; Reginald Arvizu; David Silveria ‡	Follow the Leader	1998		
"Ball Tongue"	Korn	Jonathan Davis; James Shaffer; Brian Welch; Reginald Arvizu; David Silveria ‡	Korn	1994		
"Beat It Upright"	Korn	Jonathan Davis; James Shaffer; Brian Welch; Reginald Arvizu; David Silveria ‡	Untouchables	2002		
"Beg for Me"	Korn	Jonathan Davis; James Shaffer; Brian Welch; Reginald Arvizu; David Silveria ‡	Issues	1999		
"Bitch, We Got a Problem"	Korn	Jonathan Davis; James Shaffer; Reginald Arvizu; Zac Baird; Atticus Ross	Untitled	2007		
"Black Is the Soul"	Korn	Jonathan Davis; James Shaffer; Brian Welch; Reginald Arvizu; Ray Luzier ‡	The Serenity of Suffering	2016		
"Blame"	Korn	Jonathan Davis; James Shaffer; Brian Welch; Reginald Arvizu; David Silveria ‡	Untouchables	2002		
"Bleeding Out"	Korn; Feed Me	Jonathan Davis; James Shaffer; Reginald Arvizu; Ray Luzier; Jon Gooch	The Path of Totality	2011		
"Blind" †	Korn	Jonathan Davis; James Shaffer; Brian Welch; Reginald Arvizu; David Silveria; Dennis Shinn; Ryan Shuck	Korn	1994		
"Bottled Up Inside"	Korn	Jonathan Davis; James Shaffer; Brian Welch; Reginald Arvizu; David Silveria ‡	Untouchables	2002		
"Break Some Off"	Korn	Jonathan Davis; James Shaffer; Brian Welch; Reginald Arvizu; David Silveria ‡	Take a Look in the Mirror	2003		
"Burn the Obedient"	Korn; Noisia	Jonathan Davis; James Shaffer; Reginald Arvizu; Ray Luzier; Nik Roos; Martijn van Sonderen; Thijs de Vlieger	The Path of Totality	2011		
"Camel Song"	Korn	Jonathan Davis; James Shaffer; Brian Welch; Reginald Arvizu; David Silveria ‡	End of Days	1999		
"Cameltosis"	Korn; Tre Hardson	Jonathan Davis; James Shaffer; Brian Welch; Reginald Arvizu; David Silveria; Trevant Hardson	Follow the Leader	1998		
"Chaos Lives in Everything"	Korn; Skrillex	Jonathan Davis; James Shaffer; Reginald Arvizu; Ray Luzier; Sonny Moore	The Path of Totality	2011		
"Chi"	Korn	Jonathan Davis; James Shaffer; Brian Welch; Reginald Arvizu; David Silveria ‡	Life Is Peachy	1996		
"Children of the Korn" †	Korn; Ice Cube	Jonathan Davis; James Shaffer; Brian Welch; Reginald Arvizu; David Silveria; O'Shea Jackson	Follow the Leader	1998		
"Christmas Song" †	Korn	Jonathan Davis; James Shaffer; Brian Welch; Reginald Arvizu; David Silveria ‡	"Christmas Song"	1993		(Note: "Christmas Song" is a reworked version of the traditional poem "A Visit from St. Nicholas", attributed to Clement Clarke Moore.)
"Clown" †	Korn	Jonathan Davis; James Shaffer; Brian Welch; Reginald Arvizu; David Silveria ‡	Korn	1994		
"Coming Undone" †	Korn	Jonathan Davis; James Shaffer; Reginald Arvizu; David Silveria; Lauren Fownes; Graham Edwards; David Alspach	See You on the Other Side	2005		
"Coming Undone wit It" †	Dem Franchize Boyz; Korn	Jonathan Davis; James Shaffer; Reginald Arvizu; David Silveria; Lauren Fownes; Graham Edwards; David Alspach; Jamall Willingham; Gerald Tiller; Bernard Leverette; Maurice Gleaton; D'Angelo Hunt; Robert Hill; Charles Hammond	Chopped, Screwed, Live and Unglued	2006		(Note: "Coming Undone wit It" is a mashup of "Coming Undone" and "Lean wit It, Rock wit It".)
"Counting"	Korn	Jonathan Davis; James Shaffer; Brian Welch; Reginald Arvizu; David Silveria ‡	Issues	1999		
"Counting on Me"	Korn	Jonathan Davis; James Shaffer; Brian Welch; Reginald Arvizu; David Silveria ‡	Take a Look in the Mirror	2003		
"Daddy"	Korn	Jonathan Davis; James Shaffer; Brian Welch; Reginald Arvizu; David Silveria ‡	Korn	1994		
"Dead"	Korn	Jonathan Davis; James Shaffer; Brian Welch; Reginald Arvizu; David Silveria ‡	Issues	1999		
"Dead Bodies Everywhere"	Korn	Jonathan Davis; James Shaffer; Brian Welch; Reginald Arvizu; David Silveria ‡	Follow the Leader	1998		
"Deep Inside"	Korn	Jonathan Davis; James Shaffer; Brian Welch; Reginald Arvizu; David Silveria ‡	Take a Look in the Mirror	2003		
"Did My Time" †	Korn	Jonathan Davis; James Shaffer; Brian Welch; Reginald Arvizu; David Silveria ‡	Take a Look in the Mirror	2003		
"Die Another Day"	Korn	Jonathan Davis; James Shaffer; Brian Welch; Reginald Arvizu; Ray Luzier; Don Gilmore	The Paradigm Shift	2013		(Note: "Die Another Day", "Hater", "Tell Me What You Want", "The Game Is Over" and "Wish I Wasn't Born Today" were released as bonus tracks on special editions of The Paradigm Shift.)
"Die Yet Another Night"	Korn	Jonathan Davis; James Shaffer; Brian Welch; Reginald Arvizu; Ray Luzier ‡	The Serenity of Suffering	2016		
"Dirty"	Korn	Jonathan Davis; James Shaffer; Brian Welch; Reginald Arvizu; David Silveria ‡	Issues	1999		
"Divine"	Korn	Jonathan Davis; James Shaffer; Brian Welch; Reginald Arvizu; David Silveria ‡	Korn	1994		
"Do What They Say"	Korn	Jonathan Davis; James Shaffer; Reginald Arvizu; Zac Baird; Atticus Ross	Untitled	2007		
"Earache My Eye"	Korn	Cheech Marin; Tommy Chong	Follow the Leader	1998		(Note: "Earache My Eye" was originally recorded by Cheech & Chong.)
"Eaten Up Inside"	Korn	Jonathan Davis; James Shaffer; Reginald Arvizu; David Silveria; Lauren Fownes; Graham Edwards; David Alspach	See You on the Other Side (special edition only)	2005		(Note: "Eaten Up Inside", "It's Me Again" and "Last Legal Drug (Le Petit Mort)" were released as bonus tracks on special editions of See You on the Other Side. "Eaten Up Inside" was also released as a B-side to "Coming Undone".)
"Embrace"	Korn	Jonathan Davis; James Shaffer; Brian Welch; Reginald Arvizu; David Silveria ‡	Untouchables	2002		
"End of Time"	Q-Tip; Korn	Kamaal Fareed; Jonathan Davis	Amplified	1999		
"Ever Be"	Korn	Jonathan Davis; James Shaffer; Reginald Arvizu; Zac Baird; Terry Bozzio	Untitled	2007		
"Everything Falls Apart"	Korn	Jonathan Davis; James Shaffer; Brian Welch; Reginald Arvizu; Ray Luzier ‡	The Serenity of Suffering	2016		
"Everything I've Known" †	Korn	Jonathan Davis; James Shaffer; Brian Welch; Reginald Arvizu; David Silveria ‡	Take a Look in the Mirror	2003		
"Evolution" †	Korn	Jonathan Davis; James Shaffer; Reginald Arvizu; Zac Baird	Untitled	2007		
"Faget"	Korn	Jonathan Davis; James Shaffer; Brian Welch; Reginald Arvizu; David Silveria ‡	Korn	1994		
"Fake"	Korn	Jonathan Davis; James Shaffer; Brian Welch; Reginald Arvizu; David Silveria ‡	Korn	1994		
"Falling Away from Me" †	Korn	Jonathan Davis; James Shaffer; Brian Welch; Reginald Arvizu; David Silveria ‡	Issues	1999		
"Fear Is a Place to Live"	Korn	Jonathan Davis; James Shaffer; Reginald Arvizu; Ray Luzier ‡	Korn III: Remember Who You Are	2010		
"Fight the Power"	Korn; Xzibit	Carlton Ridenhour; Eric Sadler	xXx: State of the Union	2005		(Note: "Fight the Power" was originally recorded by Public Enemy.)
"For No One"	Korn	Jonathan Davis; James Shaffer; Reginald Arvizu; David Silveria; Lauren Fownes; Graham Edwards; David Alspach	See You on the Other Side	2005		
"Freak on a Leash" †	Korn	Jonathan Davis; James Shaffer; Brian Welch; Reginald Arvizu; David Silveria ‡	Follow the Leader	1998		
"Fuck Dying"	Ice Cube; Korn	O'Shea Jackson; Stephen Anderson	War & Peace Vol. 1 (The War Disc)	1998		
"Fuels the Comedy"	Korn; Kill the Noise	Jonathan Davis; James Shaffer; Reginald Arvizu; Ray Luzier; Jake Stanczak	The Path of Totality	2011		(Note: "Fuels the Comedy" and "Tension" were released as bonus tracks on special editions of The Path of Totality.)
"Get Up!" †	Korn; Skrillex	Jonathan Davis; James Shaffer; Sonny Moore	The Path of Totality	2011		
"Getting Off"	Korn	Jonathan Davis; James Shaffer; Reginald Arvizu; David Silveria; Lauren Fownes; Graham Edwards; David Alspach	See You on the Other Side	2005		
"Good God" †	Korn	Jonathan Davis; James Shaffer; Brian Welch; Reginald Arvizu; David Silveria ‡	Life Is Peachy	1996		
"Got the Life" †	Korn	Jonathan Davis; James Shaffer; Brian Welch; Reginald Arvizu; David Silveria ‡	Follow the Leader	1998		
"Hater" †	Korn	Jonathan Davis; James Shaffer; Brian Welch; Reginald Arvizu; Ray Luzier; Don Gilmore; Nick Suddarth; Tyler Blue; Patrick Rowley	The Paradigm Shift	2013		
"Hating"	Korn	Jonathan Davis; James Shaffer; Brian Welch; Reginald Arvizu; David Silveria ‡	Untouchables	2002		
"Haze" †	Korn	Jonathan Davis	"Haze"	2008		(Note: "Haze" was written for the 2008 Ubisoft video game Haze.)
"Helmet in the Bush"	Korn	Jonathan Davis; James Shaffer; Brian Welch; Reginald Arvizu; David Silveria ‡	Korn	1994		
"Here It Comes Again"	Korn	Jonathan Davis; James Shaffer; Brian Welch; Reginald Arvizu; David Silveria ‡	Take a Look in the Mirror	2003		
"Here to Stay" †	Korn	Jonathan Davis; James Shaffer; Brian Welch; Reginald Arvizu; David Silveria ‡	Untouchables	2002		
"Hey Daddy"	Korn	Jonathan Davis; James Shaffer; Brian Welch; Reginald Arvizu; David Silveria ‡	Issues	1999		
"Hold On" †	Korn	Jonathan Davis; James Shaffer; Reginald Arvizu; Zac Baird	Untitled	2007		
"Holding All These Lies"	Korn	Jonathan Davis; James Shaffer; Reginald Arvizu; Ray Luzier ‡	Korn III: Remember Who You Are	2010		
"Hollow Life"	Korn	Jonathan Davis; James Shaffer; Brian Welch; Reginald Arvizu; David Silveria ‡	Untouchables	2002		
"Hushabye"	Korn	Jonathan Davis; James Shaffer; Reginald Arvizu; Zac Baird	Untitled	2007		
"Hypocrites"	Korn	Jonathan Davis; James Shaffer; Reginald Arvizu; David Silveria; Lauren Fownes; Graham Edwards; David Alspach	See You on the Other Side	2005		
"I Can Remember"	Korn	Jonathan Davis; James Shaffer; Brian Welch; Reginald Arvizu; David Silveria ‡	"Got the Life"	1998		
"I Will Protect You"	Korn	Jonathan Davis; James Shaffer; Reginald Arvizu; Zac Baird; Terry Bozzio	Untitled	2007		
"I'm Done"	Korn	Jonathan Davis; James Shaffer; Brian Welch; Reginald Arvizu; David Silveria ‡	Take a Look in the Mirror	2003		
"I'm Hiding"	Korn	Jonathan Davis; James Shaffer; Brian Welch; Reginald Arvizu; David Silveria ‡	Untouchables	2002		
"Illuminati"	Korn; Excision; Downlink	Jonathan Davis; James Shaffer; Reginald Arvizu; Ray Luzier; Jeff Abel; Sean Casavant	The Path of Totality	2011		
"Innocent Bystander"	Korn	Jonathan Davis; James Shaffer; Reginald Arvizu; Zac Baird	Untitled	2007		
"Insane"	Korn	Jonathan Davis; James Shaffer; Brian Welch; Reginald Arvizu; Ray Luzier ‡	The Serenity of Suffering	2016		
"Inside Out"	Korn	Jonathan Davis; James Shaffer; Reginald Arvizu; David Silveria; Lauren Fownes; Graham Edwards; David Alspach	See You on the Other Side (iTunes edition only)	2005		
"It's All Wrong"	Korn	Jonathan Davis; James Shaffer; Brian Welch; Reginald Arvizu; Ray Luzier; Don Gilmore	The Paradigm Shift	2013		
"It's Gonna Go Away"	Korn	Jonathan Davis; James Shaffer; Brian Welch; Reginald Arvizu; David Silveria ‡	Issues	1999		
"It's Me Again"	Korn	Jonathan Davis; James Shaffer; Reginald Arvizu; David Silveria; Lauren Fownes; Graham Edwards; David Alspach	See You on the Other Side (special edition only)	2005		
"It's On!"	Korn	Jonathan Davis; James Shaffer; Brian Welch; Reginald Arvizu; David Silveria ‡	Follow the Leader	1998		
"Jingle Balls"	Korn	Jonathan Davis; James Shaffer; Brian Welch; Reginald Arvizu; David Silveria ‡	Issues	1999		(Note: "Jingle Balls" was released as a bonus track on special editions of Issues, and also as a B-side to "Falling Away from Me".)
"Justin"	Korn	Jonathan Davis; James Shaffer; Brian Welch; Reginald Arvizu; David Silveria ‡	Follow the Leader	1998		
"K@#Ø%!"	Korn	Jonathan Davis; James Shaffer; Brian Welch; Reginald Arvizu; David Silveria ‡	Life Is Peachy	1996		
"Kick the P.A."	Korn; The Dust Brothers	Jonathan Davis; James Shaffer; Brian Welch; Reginald Arvizu; David Silveria; Michael Simpson; John King	Spawn: The Album	1997		
"Kidnap the Sandy Claws"	Korn	Danny Elfman	Nightmare Revisited	2008		
"Kill Mercy Within"	Korn; Noisia	Jonathan Davis; James Shaffer; Reginald Arvizu; Ray Luzier; Nik Roos; Martijn van Sonderen; Thijs de Vlieger	The Path of Totality	2011		
"Kill You"	Korn	Jonathan Davis; James Shaffer; Brian Welch; Reginald Arvizu; David Silveria ‡	Life Is Peachy	1996		
"Killing"	Korn	Jonathan Davis; James Shaffer; Reginald Arvizu; Zac Baird; Terry Bozzio	Untitled	2007		
"Kiss" †	Korn	Jonathan Davis; James Shaffer; Reginald Arvizu; Zac Baird; Atticus Ross	Untitled	2007		
"Last Legal Drug (Le Petit Mort)"	Korn	Jonathan Davis; Lauren Fownes; Graham Edwards; David Alspach; Atticus Ross	See You on the Other Side	2005		
"Lead the Parade"	Korn	Jonathan Davis; James Shaffer; Reginald Arvizu; Ray Luzier ‡	Korn III: Remember Who You Are	2010		
"Let the Guilt Go" †	Korn	Jonathan Davis; James Shaffer; Reginald Arvizu; Ray Luzier ‡	Korn III: Remember Who You Are	2010		
"Let's Do This Now"	Korn	Jonathan Davis; James Shaffer; Brian Welch; Reginald Arvizu; David Silveria ‡	Take a Look in the Mirror	2003		
"Let's Get This Party Started"	Korn	Jonathan Davis; James Shaffer; Brian Welch; Reginald Arvizu; David Silveria ‡	Issues	1999		
"Let's Go"	Korn; Noisia	Jonathan Davis; James Shaffer; Reginald Arvizu; Ray Luzier; Nik Roos; Martijn van Sonderen; Thijs de Vlieger	The Path of Totality	2011		
"Liar"	Korn	Jonathan Davis; James Shaffer; Reginald Arvizu; David Silveria; Lauren Fownes; Graham Edwards; David Alspach	See You on the Other Side	2005		
"Lies"	Korn	Jonathan Davis; James Shaffer; Brian Welch; Reginald Arvizu; David Silveria ‡	Korn	1994		
"Lost"	Korn	Jonathan Davis; James Shaffer; Brian Welch; Reginald Arvizu; David Silveria ‡	Life Is Peachy	1996		
"Love & Meth"	Korn	Jonathan Davis; James Shaffer; Brian Welch; Reginald Arvizu; Ray Luzier; Don Gilmore; Jasen Rauch; Nick Suddarth	The Paradigm Shift	2013		
"Love and Luxury"	Korn	Jonathan Davis; James Shaffer; Reginald Arvizu; Zac Baird	Untitled	2007		
"Love Song"	Korn	Jonathan Davis; James Shaffer; Reginald Arvizu; David Silveria; Lauren Fownes; Graham Edwards; David Alspach; Atticus Ross	See You on the Other Side	2005		
"Lowrider"	Korn	Howard E. Scott; Morris Dickerson; Lonnie Jordan; Harold Ray Brown; Thomas Allen; Charles Miller; Lee Oskar; Jerry Goldstein	Life Is Peachy	1996		(Note: "Lowrider" was originally recorded by War.)
"Lullaby for a Sadist"	Korn	Jonathan Davis; James Shaffer; Brian Welch; Reginald Arvizu; Ray Luzier; Don Gilmore	The Paradigm Shift	2013		
"Make Believe"	Korn	Jonathan Davis; James Shaffer; Brian Welch; Reginald Arvizu; David Silveria ‡	Untouchables	2002		
"Make Me Bad" †	Korn	Jonathan Davis; James Shaffer; Brian Welch; Reginald Arvizu; David Silveria ‡	Issues	1999		
"Mass Hysteria"	Korn	Jonathan Davis; James Shaffer; Brian Welch; Reginald Arvizu; Ray Luzier; Don Gilmore	The Paradigm Shift	2013		
"Michael & Geri"	Korn	Jonathan Davis; James Shaffer; Brian Welch; Reginald Arvizu; David Silveria ‡	Korn	1994		
"Move On"	Korn	Jonathan Davis; James Shaffer; Reginald Arvizu; Ray Luzier ‡	Korn III: Remember Who You Are	2010		
"Mr. Rogers"	Korn	Jonathan Davis; James Shaffer; Brian Welch; Reginald Arvizu; David Silveria ‡	Life Is Peachy	1996		
"My Gift to You"	Korn	Jonathan Davis; James Shaffer; Brian Welch; Reginald Arvizu; David Silveria ‡	Follow the Leader	1998		
"My Wall"	Korn; Excision	Jonathan Davis; James Shaffer; Reginald Arvizu; Ray Luzier; Jeff Abel	The Path of Totality	2011		
"Narcissistic Cannibal" †	Korn; Skrillex; Kill the Noise	Jonathan Davis; James Shaffer; Reginald Arvizu; Ray Luzier; Sonny Moore; Jake Stanczak; Luke Walker	The Path of Totality	2011		
"Need To" †	Korn	Jonathan Davis; James Shaffer; Brian Welch; Reginald Arvizu; David Silveria ‡	Korn	1994		
"Never Around"	Korn	Jonathan Davis; James Shaffer; Reginald Arvizu; Ray Luzier ‡	Korn III: Remember Who You Are	2010		
"Never Never" †	Korn	Jonathan Davis; James Shaffer; Brian Welch; Reginald Arvizu; Ray Luzier; Don Gilmore	The Paradigm Shift	2013		
"Next in Line"	Korn	Jonathan Davis; James Shaffer; Brian Welch; Reginald Arvizu; Ray Luzier ‡	The Serenity of Suffering	2016		
"No One's There"	Korn	Jonathan Davis; James Shaffer; Brian Welch; Reginald Arvizu; David Silveria ‡	Untouchables	2002		
"No Place to Hide" †	Korn	Jonathan Davis; James Shaffer; Brian Welch; Reginald Arvizu; David Silveria ‡	Life Is Peachy	1996		
"No Way"	Korn	Jonathan Davis; James Shaffer; Brian Welch; Reginald Arvizu; David Silveria ‡	Issues	1999		
"Oildale (Leave Me Alone)" †	Korn	Jonathan Davis; James Shaffer; Reginald Arvizu; Ray Luzier ‡	Korn III: Remember Who You Are	2010		
"One More Time"	Korn	Jonathan Davis; James Shaffer; Brian Welch; Reginald Arvizu; David Silveria ‡	Untouchables	2002		
"Open Up"	Korn	Jonathan Davis; James Shaffer; Reginald Arvizu; David Silveria; Lauren Fownes; Graham Edwards; David Alspach; Atticus Ross	See You on the Other Side	2005		
"Paranoid and Aroused"	Korn	Jonathan Davis; James Shaffer; Brian Welch; Reginald Arvizu; Ray Luzier; Don Gilmore	The Paradigm Shift	2013		
"People Pleaser"	Korn	Jonathan Davis; James Shaffer; Reginald Arvizu; Ray Luzier ‡	Korn III: Remember Who You Are	2010		(Note: "People Pleaser" and "Trapped Underneath the Stairs" were released as bonus tracks on special editions of Korn III: Remember Who You Are.)
"Play Me"	Korn; Nas	Jonathan Davis; James Shaffer; Brian Welch; Reginald Arvizu; David Silveria ‡	Take a Look in the Mirror	2003		
"Please Come for Me"	Korn	Jonathan Davis; James Shaffer; Brian Welch; Reginald Arvizu; Ray Luzier ‡	The Serenity of Suffering	2016		
"Politics" †	Korn	Jonathan Davis; James Shaffer; Reginald Arvizu; David Silveria; Lauren Fownes; Graham Edwards; David Alspach	See You on the Other Side	2005		
"Pop a Pill"	Korn	Jonathan Davis; James Shaffer; Reginald Arvizu; Ray Luzier ‡	Korn III: Remember Who You Are	2010		
"Porno Creep"	Korn	Jonathan Davis; James Shaffer; Brian Welch; Reginald Arvizu; David Silveria ‡	Life Is Peachy	1996		
"Predictable"	Korn	Jonathan Davis; James Shaffer; Brian Welch; Reginald Arvizu; David Silveria ‡	Korn	1994		
"Pretty"	Korn	Jonathan Davis; James Shaffer; Brian Welch; Reginald Arvizu; David Silveria ‡	Follow the Leader	1998		
"Prey for Me"	Korn	Jonathan Davis; James Shaffer; Brian Welch; Reginald Arvizu; Ray Luzier; Don Gilmore	The Paradigm Shift	2013		
"Proud"	Korn	Jonathan Davis; James Shaffer; Brian Welch; Reginald Arvizu; David Silveria ‡	I Know What You Did Last Summer	1997		
"Punishment Time"	Korn	Jonathan Davis; James Shaffer; Brian Welch; Reginald Arvizu; Ray Luzier; Don Gilmore	The Paradigm Shift	2013		
"Reclaim My Place"	Korn	Jonathan Davis; James Shaffer; Brian Welch; Reginald Arvizu; David Silveria ‡	Follow the Leader	1998		
"Right Now" †	Korn	Jonathan Davis; James Shaffer; Brian Welch; Reginald Arvizu; David Silveria ‡	Take a Look in the Mirror	2003		
"Rotting in Vain" †	Korn	Jonathan Davis; James Shaffer; Brian Welch; Reginald Arvizu; Ray Luzier ‡	The Serenity of Suffering	2016		
"Sanctuary"	Korn; Downlink	Jonathan Davis; James Shaffer; Reginald Arvizu; Ray Luzier; Sean Casavant	The Path of Totality	2011		
"Sean Olson"	Korn	Jonathan Davis; James Shaffer; Brian Welch; Reginald Arvizu; David Silveria ‡	The Crow: City of Angels	1996		
"Seed"	Korn	Jonathan Davis; James Shaffer; Brian Welch; Reginald Arvizu; David Silveria ‡	Follow the Leader	1998		
"Seen It All"	Korn	Jonathan Davis; James Shaffer; Reginald Arvizu; David Silveria; Lauren Fownes; Graham Edwards; David Alspach; Atticus Ross	See You on the Other Side	2005		
"Shoots and Ladders" †	Korn	Jonathan Davis; James Shaffer; Brian Welch; Reginald Arvizu; David Silveria ‡	Korn	1994		
"Sing Sorrow"	Korn	Jonathan Davis; James Shaffer; Reginald Arvizu; Zac Baird; Terry Bozzio	Untitled	2007		(Note: "Sing Sorrow" was released as a bonus track on special editions of Korn's untitled album, and also as a B-side to "Hold On".)
"Somebody Someone" †	Korn	Jonathan Davis; James Shaffer; Brian Welch; Reginald Arvizu; David Silveria ‡	Issues	1999		
"Souvenir"	Korn	Jonathan Davis; James Shaffer; Reginald Arvizu; David Silveria; Lauren Fownes; Graham Edwards; David Alspach	See You on the Other Side	2005		(Note: "Souvenir" is also known as "Souvenir of Sadness".)
"Spike in My Veins" †	Korn	Jonathan Davis; James Shaffer; Brian Welch; Reginald Arvizu; Ray Luzier; Nik Roos; Martijn van Sonderen; Thijs de Vlieger	The Paradigm Shift	2013		
"Starting Over"	Korn	Jonathan Davis; James Shaffer; Reginald Arvizu; Zac Baird; Atticus Ross	Untitled	2007		
"Swallow"	Korn	Jonathan Davis; James Shaffer; Brian Welch; Reginald Arvizu; David Silveria ‡	Life Is Peachy	1996		
"Take Me"	Korn	Jonathan Davis; James Shaffer; Brian Welch; Reginald Arvizu; Ray Luzier ‡	The Serenity of Suffering	2016		
"Tearjerker"	Korn	Jonathan Davis; James Shaffer; Reginald Arvizu; David Silveria; Lauren Fownes; Graham Edwards; David Alspach; Atticus Ross; Leopold Ross	See You on the Other Side	2005		(Note: "Tearjerker" is also known as "Saturated Loneliness".)
"Tell Me What You Want"	Korn	Jonathan Davis; James Shaffer; Brian Welch; Reginald Arvizu; Ray Luzier; Don Gilmore	The Paradigm Shift	2013		
"Tension"	Korn; Excision; Datsik; Downlink; Infected Mushroom	Jonathan Davis; James Shaffer; Reginald Arvizu; Ray Luzier; Jeff Abel; Troy Beetles; Sean Casavant	The Path of Totality	2011		
"The Game Is Over"	Korn	Jonathan Davis; James Shaffer; Brian Welch; Reginald Arvizu; Ray Luzier; Don Gilmore	The Paradigm Shift	2013		
"The Hating"	Korn	Jonathan Davis; James Shaffer; Brian Welch; Reginald Arvizu; Ray Luzier ‡	The Serenity of Suffering	2016		
"The Past"	Korn	Jonathan Davis; James Shaffer; Reginald Arvizu; Ray Luzier ‡	Korn III: Remember Who You Are	2010		
"The Serenity of Suffering"	Korn	Jonathan Davis; James Shaffer; Brian Welch; Reginald Arvizu; Ray Luzier ‡	The Serenity of Suffering	2016		
"Thoughtless" †	Korn	Jonathan Davis; James Shaffer; Brian Welch; Reginald Arvizu; David Silveria ‡	Untouchables	2002		
"Throw Me Away"	Korn	Jonathan Davis; James Shaffer; Reginald Arvizu; David Silveria; Lauren Fownes; Graham Edwards; David Alspach; Atticus Ross	See You on the Other Side	2005		(Note: "Throw Me Away" is also known as "Don't Let Them Throw Me Away".)
"Too Late I'm Dead"	Korn	Jonathan Davis; Lauren Fownes; Graham Edwards; David Alspach; Atticus Ross	"Twisted Transistor"	2005		
"Trapped Underneath the Stairs"	Korn	Jonathan Davis; James Shaffer; Reginald Arvizu; Ray Luzier ‡	Korn III: Remember Who You Are	2010		
"Trash"	Korn	Jonathan Davis; James Shaffer; Brian Welch; Reginald Arvizu; David Silveria ‡	Issues	1999		
"Twist"	Korn	Jonathan Davis; James Shaffer; Brian Welch; Reginald Arvizu; David Silveria ‡	Life Is Peachy	1996		
"Twisted Transistor" †	Korn	Jonathan Davis; James Shaffer; Reginald Arvizu; David Silveria; Lauren Fownes; Graham Edwards; David Alspach	See You on the Other Side	2005		
"Uber-Time"	Korn	Jonathan Davis; James Shaffer; Reginald Arvizu; Ray Luzier ‡	Korn III: Remember Who You Are	2010		
"Victimized"	Korn	Jonathan Davis; James Shaffer; Brian Welch; Reginald Arvizu; Ray Luzier; Don Gilmore	The Paradigm Shift	2013		
"Wake Up"	Korn	Jonathan Davis; James Shaffer; Brian Welch; Reginald Arvizu; David Silveria ‡	Issues	1999		
"Wake Up"	The Notorious B.I.G. Korn	Christopher Wallace; Deric Angelettie; Henri Charlemagne; Dwight Grant; O'Shea Jackson; Eric Matlock; Robert Ross; Jonathan Davis; James Shaffer; Reginald Arvizu; Atticus Ross	Duets: The Final Chapter	2005		
"Wake Up Hate"	Korn	Jonathan Davis; James Shaffer; Brian Welch; Reginald Arvizu; David Silveria ‡	Untouchables	2002		
"Way Too Far" †	Korn; 12th Planet; Flinch	Jonathan Davis; James Shaffer; Reginald Arvizu; Ray Luzier; John Dadzie; Adam Glassco; Luke Walker	The Path of Totality	2011		
"What We Do"	Korn	Jonathan Davis; James Shaffer; Brian Welch; Reginald Arvizu; Ray Luzier; Don Gilmore	The Paradigm Shift	2013		
"When Will This End"	Korn	Jonathan Davis; James Shaffer; Brian Welch; Reginald Arvizu; David Silveria ‡	Take a Look in the Mirror	2003		
"When You're Not There"	Korn	Jonathan Davis; James Shaffer; Brian Welch; Reginald Arvizu; Ray Luzier ‡	The Serenity of Suffering	2016		
"Wicked"	Korn	O'Shea Jackson; Don Jaguar	Life Is Peachy	1996		(Note: "Wicked", originally recorded by Ice Cube featuring Don Jaguar, features additional vocals by Chino Moreno.)
"Wish I Wasn't Born Today"	Korn	Jonathan Davis; James Shaffer; Brian Welch; Reginald Arvizu; Ray Luzier; Don Gilmore	The Paradigm Shift	2013		
"Wish You Could Be Me"	Korn	Jonathan Davis; James Shaffer; Brian Welch; Reginald Arvizu; David Silveria ‡	Issues	1999		
"Word Up!" †	Korn	Larry Blackmon; Tomi Jenkins	Greatest Hits Vol. 1	2004		(Note: "Word Up!" was originally recorded by Cameo.)
"Y'All Want a Single" †	Korn	Jonathan Davis; James Shaffer; Brian Welch; Reginald Arvizu; David Silveria ‡	Take a Look in the Mirror	2003		
"So Unfair"	Korn	Jonathan Davis; James Shaffer; Brian Welch; Reginald Arvizu; Ray Luzier	The Paradigm Shift(mp3 downloadable song)	2013		
"The End Begins"	Korn	Jonathan Davis	The Nothing	2019		
"Cold"	Korn	Jonathan Davis; James Shaffer; Brian Welch; Reginald Arvizu; Ray Luzier; Lauren Christy; Nick Raskulinecz	The Nothing	2019		
"You'll Never Find Me"	Korn	Jonathan Davis; James Shaffer; Brian Welch; Reginald Arvizu; Ray Luzier; Billy Corgan; Nick Raskulinecz	The Nothing	2019		
"The Darkness Is Revealing"	Korn	Jonathan Davis; James Shaffer; Brian Welch; Reginald Arvizu; Ray Luzier; Nick Raskulinecz	The Nothing	2019		
"Idiosyncracy"	Korn	Jonathan Davis; James Shaffer; Brian Welch; Reginald Arvizu; Ray Luzier; Nick Raskulinecz	The Nothing	2019		
"The Seduction of Indulgence"	Korn	Jonathan Davis	The Nothing	2019		
"Finally Free"	Korn	Jonathan Davis; James Shaffer; Brian Welch; Reginald Arvizu; Ray Luzier	The Nothing	2019		
"Can You Hear Me"	Korn	Jonathan Davis; James Shaffer; Brian Welch; Reginald Arvizu; Ray Luzier	The Nothing	2019		
"The Ringmaster"	Korn	Jonathan Davis; James Shaffer; Brian Welch; Reginald Arvizu; Ray Luzier	The Nothing	2019		
"Gravity of Discomfort"	Korn	Jonathan Davis; James Shaffer; Brian Welch; Reginald Arvizu; Ray Luzier; Lauren Christy; Nick Raskulinecz	The Nothing	2019		
"H@rder"	Korn	Jonathan Davis; James Shaffer; Brian Welch; Reginald Arvizu; Ray Luzier; Lauren Christy; Nick Raskulinecz	The Nothing	2019		
"This Loss"	Korn	Jonathan Davis; James Shaffer; Brian Welch; Reginald Arvizu; Ray Luzier; John Feldmann; Nick Raskulinecz	The Nothing	2019		
"Surrender to Failure"	Korn	Jonathan Davis	The Nothing	2019		
