= Greatest Hits Vol. 1 (Korn album) =

Greatest hits album by Korn
- Released: October 5, 2004
- Recorded: 1994–2004
- Genre: Nu metal; alternative metal
- Length: 75:47
- Label: Epic; Immortal
- Producer: Various producers

Korn chronology
Take a Look in the Mirror (2003)	Greatest Hits Vol. 1 (2004)	See You on the Other Side (2005)

Singles from Greatest Hits Vol. 1
- 1. "Word Up!" Released: 2004; 2. "Another Brick in the Wall, Pts. 1–3" Released: 2004

Professional ratings
Review scores
Source	Rating
AllMusic	4/5 stars
Blender	3/5 stars

Greatest Hits Vol. 1 is a greatest hits album by American nu metal band Korn, released on October 5, 2004, by Epic and Immortal Records. The album features select tracks from their first six studio albums presented in reverse chronological order. There are two previously unreleased songs on the compilation: a cover of Cameo's "Word Up!" and a compilation of all three parts of Pink Floyd's "Another Brick in the Wall" and "Goodbye Cruel World". These were the final songs recorded with their full original lineup, as guitarist Brian Welch left the band shortly after the album's release in February the following year, until his return in 2013, by which time drummer David Silveria had departed permanently.

Greatest Hits Vol. 1 debuted and peaked at No. 4 on the Billboard 200, achieving a Platinum certification by the RIAA. For unspecified reasons Korn left off three of their hits, "Thoughtless", "No Place to Hide" and "Good God" but included songs "Trash" and "Twist" on the album, though neither were released as singles. The version of "Freak on a Leash" on this album features an extended intro. Because of this, the back cover lists the length of the track as being 4:15 (the length of the album version on Follow the Leader), when the length of the version on this album is 4:27.

== Track listing ==
All tracks are written by Korn (Jonathan Davis, James Shaffer, Brian Welch, Reginald Arvizu, David Silveria), except where noted.

No.	Title	Writer(s)	Original album	Length
1.	"Word Up!" (Cameo cover)	Larry Blackmon; Tomi Jenkins	Previously unreleased	2:53
2.	"Another Brick in the Wall (Parts 1, 2, 3)" (Pink Floyd cover)	Roger Waters	Previously unreleased	7:08
3.	"Y'All Want a Single"		Take a Look in the Mirror	3:18
4.	"Right Now"		Take a Look in the Mirror	3:15
5.	"Did My Time"		Take a Look in the Mirror	4:07
6.	"Alone I Break"		Untouchables	4:16
7.	"Here to Stay"		Untouchables	4:32
8.	"Trash"		Issues	3:27
9.	"Somebody Someone"		Issues	3:47
10.	"Make Me Bad"		Issues	3:55
11.	"Falling Away from Me"		Issues	4:31
12.	"Got the Life"		Follow the Leader	3:48
13.	"Freak on a Leash"		Follow the Leader	4:15
14.	"Twist"		Life Is Peachy	0:50
15.	"A.D.I.D.A.S."		Life Is Peachy	2:32
16.	"Clown"		Korn	4:36
17.	"Shoots and Ladders"		Korn	5:23
18.	"Blind"	Korn; Dennis Shinn; Ryan Shuck	Korn	4:18
19.	"Freak on a Leash" (Dante Ross remix)		Freak on a Leash (single)	4:45
Total length:				75:47

=== Bonus DVD: Live at CBGB ===
No.	Title	Length
1.	"Right Now"
2.	"Here to Stay"
3.	"Did My Time"
4.	"Got the Life"
5.	"Freak on a Leash"
6.	"Falling Away from Me"
7.	"Blind"

Notes

- Some versions include a bonus DVD, recorded live at CBGB, New York City, on November 24, 2003.

== Personnel ==
- Jonathan Davis – vocals
- James "Munky" Shaffer – guitar
- Brian "Head" Welch – guitar
- Reginald "Fieldy" Arvizu – bass
- David Silveria – drums

== Charts ==
=== Weekly charts ===
Chart (2004)	Peak position
Australia (ARIA)	8
Austria (Ö3 Austria Top 40)	10
Belgium (Ultratop Flanders)	35
Belgium (Ultratop Wallonia)	38
Canada (Jam! CANOE)	6
Finland (Suomen virallinen lista)	20
Germany (Media Control AG)	17
Ireland (IRMA)	43
Netherlands (MegaCharts)	60
New Zealand (RIANZ)	3
Norway (VG-lista)	12
Portugal (AFP)	12
Switzerland (Schweizer Hitparade)	22
UK Albums (The Official Charts Company)	22
US Billboard 200	4
US Hard Rock Albums (Billboard)	22

=== Singles ===
Year	Song	US Alt.	US Main.	AUS	AUT	BEL (WA)	GER	NOR	SWI	UK Rock
2004	"Word Up!"	17	16	28	58	49	46	15	47	10
2004	"Another Brick in the Wall"	37	12	—	—	—	—	—	—	—

== Certifications ==
Region	Certification	Certified units/sales
Australia (ARIA)	Gold	35,000^{^}
Germany (BVMI)	Platinum	200,000^{‡}
New Zealand (RMNZ)	Platinum	15,000^{^}
United Kingdom (BPI)	Gold	100,000^{*}
United States (RIAA)	Platinum	1,000,000^{^}
^{*} Sales figures based on certification alone.^{^} Shipments figures based on certification alone.^{‡} Sales+streaming figures based on certification alone.
