= Right Now =

Right Now may refer to:

- Present, the time associated with events perceived directly

== Music ==
=== Albums ===
- Right Now (Atomic Kitten album) or the title song (see below), 2000
- Right Now (Della Reese album), 1970
- Right Now (Fabrizio Sotti Album) or the title song, 2013
- Right Now (Grandmaster Mele-Mel & Scorpio album) or the title song, 1997
- Right Now (Herbie Mann album) or the title song (see below), 1962
- Right Now! (Howard Johnson album), 1997
- Right Now! (Jackie McLean album) or the title song, 1966
- Right Now (Leon Jackson album) or the title song, a cover of the Herbie Mann song (see below), 2008
- Right Now! (Little Richard album), 1974
- Right Now! (Mel Tormé album) or the title song, a cover of the Herbie Mann song (see below), 1966
- Right Now! (Pussy Galore album), 1987
- Right Now (Rushlow album) or the title song, 2003
- Right Now (Wizz Jones album) or the title song, 1972
- Right Now: Live at the Jazz Workshop, by Charles Mingus, 1966

=== Songs ===
- "Right Now" (Al B. Sure! song), 1992
- "Right Now" (Allday song), 2014
- "Right Now" (Asian Kung-Fu Generation song), 2016
- "Right Now" (Atomic Kitten song), 1999
- "Right Now" (Avgusta song), 2025
- "Right Now" (Futurasound song), 2003
- "Right Now" (Gene Vincent song), 1959; covered by Mary Chapin Carpenter, 1991
- "Right Now" (Herbie Mann song), 1962; covered by Mel Tormé, Siouxsie/The Creatures, The Pussycat Dolls, and others
- "Right Now" (Korn song), 2003
- "Right Now" (Mary J. Blige song), 2014
- "Right Now" (NewJeans song), 2024
- "Right Now" (Nick Jonas and Robin Schulz song), 2018
- "Right Now" (Psy song), 2010
- "Right Now" (Rihanna song), 2013
- "Right Now" (SR-71 song), 2000
- "Right Now" (Van Halen song), 1992
- "Right Now (Na Na Na)", by Akon, 2008
- "Right Now", by Billy Preston from Encouraging Words, 1970
- "Right Now", by Coogie featuring Crush, 2023
- "Right Now", by Danity Kane from Danity Kane, 2006
- "Right Now", by Destroy Lonely from If Looks Could Kill, 2023
- "Right Now", by Emeli Sandé from Long Live the Angels, 2016
- "Right Now", by the Flaming Lips from Telepathic Surgery, 1989
- "Right Now", by Fort Minor from The Rising Tied, 2005
- "Right Now", by Garth Brooks from Garth Brooks in... the Life of Chris Gaines, 1999
- "Right Now", by Gracie Abrams from Good Riddance, 2023
- "Right Now", by Haim from Something to Tell You, 2017
- "Right Now", by Jaydes and Slump6s, 2022
- "Right Now", by Jeanette from Rock My Life, 2002
- "Right Now", by John Cena from You Can't See Me, 2005
- "Right Now", by Lil Baby from Harder Than Ever, 2018
- "Right Now", by Lil' Kim from The Notorious K.I.M., 2000
- "Right Now", by Lil Uzi Vert from Luv Is Rage, 2015
- "Right Now", by Megan Thee Stallion from Megan: Act II, 2024
- "Right Now", by One Direction from Midnight Memories, 2013
- "Right Now", by Playboi Carti and Pi'erre Bourne from Die Lit, 2018
- "Right Now", by Sabrina Carpenter from Eyes Wide Open, 2015
- "Right Now", by Sara Groves from Invisible Empires, 2011
- "Right Now", by Snakehips, 2017
- "Right Now", by Sophie and the Giants, 2021
- "Right Now", by Tyla from A*Pop, 2026
- "Right Now", by the Vamps, 2019
- "Right Now (Taste the Victory)", by Britney Spears, 2001

== Other media ==
- Aziz Ansari: Right Now, a 2019 stand-up comedy special by Aziz Ansari
- Right Now (book), a 2010 book by Michael Steele
- Right Now (film), a 2004 French film
- Right Now! (magazine), a British political magazine 1993–2006
- RightNow Technologies, a defunct software company acquired by Oracle

== See also ==
- Right Here, Right Now (disambiguation)
