= Right About Now =

Right About Now may refer to:

- Right About Now (Ty Herndon album), or the title cover version of the Michael Peterson song (see below)
- Right About Now: The Official Sucka Free Mix CD, a 2005 album by Talib Kweli, or the title song
- "Right About Now" (song), a 2007 song by Mousse T
- "Right About Now", a song by Michael Peterson from Modern Man
- "Right About Now", a song by The Mooney Suzuki from People Get Ready
- "Right About Now", a song by ScoLoHoFo from Oh!
- "Right About Now", a song by Tanya Tucker from What Do I Do with Me

== See also ==
- "The Rockafeller Skank", a song by Fatboy Slim often erroneously referred to as Right About Now
- Right Now (disambiguation)
