= Right Here =

Right Here may refer to:

== Albums ==
- Right Here (Eddie Money album), 1991
- Right Here (Boh Runga album), 2009
- Right Here (Shane Filan album), 2015
- Right Here (Charles Billingsley album), 2016

== Songs ==
- "Right Here" (Jeremy Camp song), 2002
- "Right Here" (Jess Glynne song), 2014
- "Right Here" (Justin Bieber song), 2012
- "Right Here" (Rudimental song), 2013
- "Right Here" (Staind song), 2005
- "Right Here" (SWV song), 1992
- "Right Here" (The Go-Betweens song), 1987
- "Right Here (Departed)", a 2008 song by Brandy Norwood
- "Right Here", by Becky Hill from Believe Me Now?, 2024
- "Right Here", by Chase Atlantic from Part One, 2017
- "Right Here", by James Morrison from Higher Than Here, 2015
- "Right Here", by Miley Cyrus from Meet Miley Cyrus, 2007
- "Right Here", by Shalamar from The Look, 1983
- "Right Here", by Shane Filan from Right Here, 2015
- "Right Here", by The Story So Far from What You Don't See, 2013
- "Right Here", by Zara Larsson from Poster Girl, 2021

== Concert tours ==
- Right Here Tour, a 2016 concert tour by Shane Filan
- Right Here World Tour, a 2024–2025 concert tour by Seventeen

== See also ==
- "I'm Right Here", a 2002 song by Samantha Mumba
- "We Right Here", a 2001 song by DMX
- Right Here, Right Now (disambiguation)
- Right There (disambiguation)
