= Right Here, Right Now =

Right Here, Right Now or Right Here Right Now may refer to:

== Films ==
- Right Here, Right Now (film), a 2003 short film by Anand Gandhi
- Right Here Right Now (2004 film), by Matthew Newton

== Books ==
- Right Here, Right Now (book), a 2018 nonfiction book by Stephen Harper
- Right Here, Right Now, a 1999 novel by Trey Ellis

== Music ==
=== Albums and videos ===
- Right Here, Right Now (David Benoit album) or the title song, 2003
- Right Here Right Now (Jordin Sparks album) or the title song, 2015
- Right Here, Right Now (video), by Atomic Kitten, 2002
- Right Here Right Now Tour, a concert tour by Van Halen, 1993
- Live: Right Here, Right Now, an album by Van Halen, 1993
- Right Here, Right Now, an album by Russ Taff, 1999
- Right Here, Right Now, a 2023 documentary about the Big Beach Boutique II concert
- Right Here, Right Now, the 2022 production by Carolina Crown Drum and Bugle Corps

=== Songs ===
- "Right Here Right Now" (BWO song), 2009
- "Right Here, Right Now" (Charlie Major song), 1999
- "Right Here, Right Now" (Fatboy Slim song), 1998
- "Right Here, Right Now" (Giorgio Moroder song), featuring Kylie Minogue, 2015
- "Right Here, Right Now" (High School Musical song), 2008
- "Right Here, Right Now" (Jesus Jones song), 1990
- "Right Here, Right Now (My Heart Belongs to You)", by Agnes Carlsson, 2005; covered by Raffaëla Paton, 2006
- "Right Here Right Now", by Abhishek Bachchan and Sunidhi Chauhan from the soundtrack of the film Bluffmaster!, 2005
- "Right Here Right Now", by KISS from Monster, 2012
- "Right Here, Right Now", by Kylie Minogue from Let's Get to It, 1991
- "Right Here, Right Now", by San Holo, 2018

== See also ==
- Right Here and Now (Owen Temple album), 2002
- Right Here and Now (Marcia Hines album), 1994
- "Right Now, Right Here", a song by Bret Michaels from Freedom of Sound, 2005
- Right Here (disambiguation)
- Right Now (disambiguation)
- Here and Now (disambiguation)
- Rite Here Rite Now, a 2024 concert film featuring Swedish rock band Ghost
