= Everything I've Known =

Single by Korn

from the album Take a Look in the Mirror
- Released: April 13, 2004
- Genre: Nu metal; alternative metal
- Length: 3:35
- Label: Immortal/Epic
- Songwriters: Reginald Arvizu, Jonathan Davis, James Shaffer, David Silveria, Brian Welch
- Producers: Jonathan Davis, Korn

Korn singles chronology
| "Y'All Want a Single" (2004) | "Everything I've Known" (2004) | "Word Up!" (2004) |

Music video
- "Everything I've Known" on YouTube

"Everything I've Known" is a song written and recorded by American nu metal band Korn for their sixth studio album, Take a Look in the Mirror. It was released as the album's fourth and final single in April 2004.

== Concept ==
"That's about when you're fighting with your girlfriend, and how when you've been together for so long, things can just get shitty." – Jonathan Davis

The meaning of the song was further explained as somewhat of an emotional reaction to what is believed to be the decline of the music industry.

== Charts ==
| Chart (2004) | Peak position |
|---|---|
| US Mainstream Rock (Billboard) | 30 |

== Music video ==
No official video was filmed for the song, although an animated video by Gregory Ecklund received moderate airplay on MTV2's Headbangers Ball.
