= Take a Look in the Mirror =

Studio album by Korn
- Released: November 21, 2003
- Recorded: April–June; August 2003
- Studios: Jonathan Davis's home studio, Los Angeles
- Genres: Nu metal; alternative metal
- Length: 56:43
- Labels: Epic; Immortal
- Producers: Jonathan Davis, Frank Filipetti

Korn chronology
| Untouchables (2002) | Take a Look in the Mirror (2003) | Greatest Hits Vol. 1 (2004) |

Singles from Take a Look in the Mirror
- 1. "Did My Time" Released: July 22, 2003; 2. "Right Now" Released: October 7, 2003; 3. "Y'All Want a Single" Released: March 9, 2004; 4. "Everything I've Known" Released: April 13, 2004

Take a Look in the Mirror is the sixth studio album by American nu metal band Korn. Released on November 21, 2003, through Epic Records and Immortal Records, it is the last Korn studio album to feature their full original lineup, as their original guitarist Brian "Head" Welch left the band in February 2005 until his return in 2013 with the album The Paradigm Shift and original drummer David Silveria left the band after plans to go on hiatus from his career in December 2006 after a year of touring in support of the following album See You on the Other Side released in 2005. It was the last studio album by Korn under the Epic and Immortal labels.

== Background ==
The album continued Korn's lowering in sales, debuting at number 19 and peaked at number 9 with first-week record sales of about 179,000, due to the release date of the album being pushed up to a Friday, with fewer sales than if it was released on the standard Tuesday. The track "Did My Time" was previously released as a CD single for the film Lara Croft: Tomb Raider – The Cradle of Life and the track "Right Now" was accompanied by a provocative cartoon video animated by Spike and Mike. The ending track "When Will This End" is followed by a long silence before a live cover of Metallica's "One" starts playing.

The album was also released in a "clean" version which utilized backmasking as well as growling in place of profanity. Take a Look in the Mirror has sold over 1.2 million copies in the US and over 2 million copies outside of the US according to Nielsen SoundScan as of January 4, 2013 and was certified platinum on December 16, 2003. Jonathan Davis has subsequently admitted in interviews that the album was written at somewhat of a rushed pace, due to the lower than expected sales of Untouchables, and having to write with the time restraint of being on that summer's Ozzfest tour.

== Composition and music ==
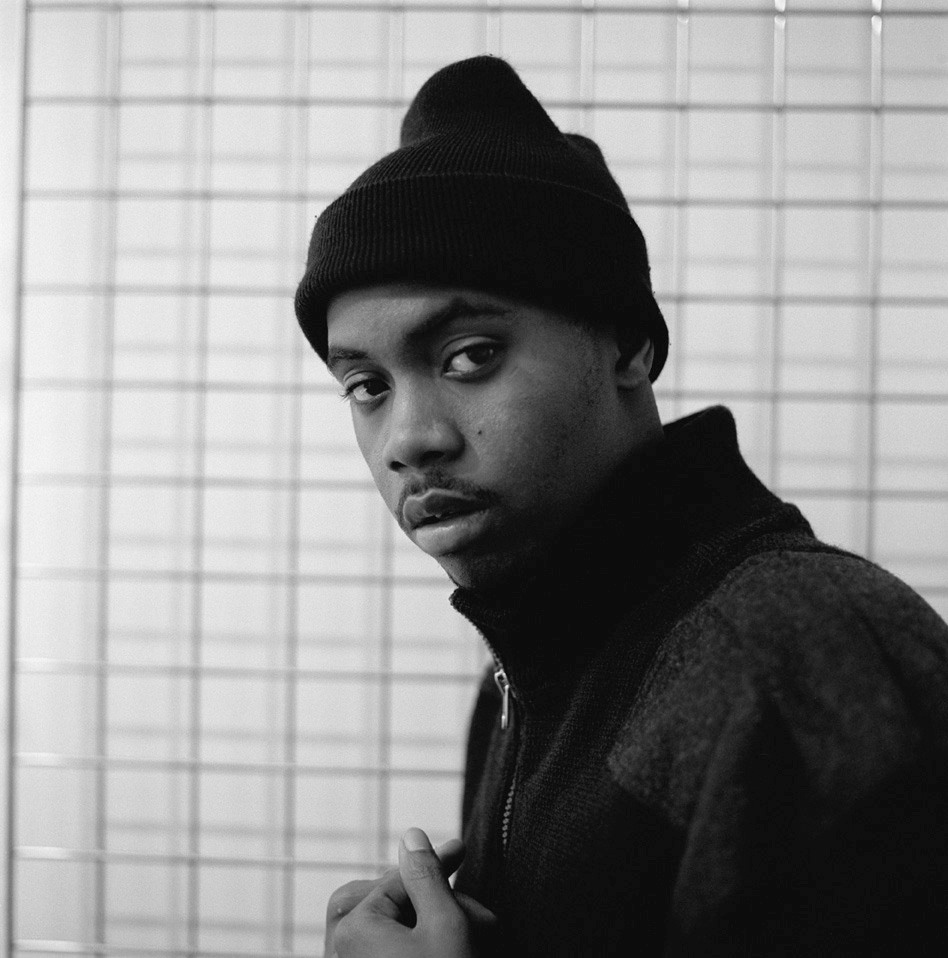
Nas is featured on the track "Play Me".

Take a Look in the Mirror marks Korn's attempt to return to a more aggressive sound as featured on their earlier albums, with guitarists Brian "Head" Welch and James "Munky" Shaffer mostly utilizing thick, heavy distortion and the occasional clean tones for contrast. A nu metal and alternative metal album, it has the aggressive sounds featured on their early work, as well as a reworked and rerecorded version of "Alive", which had previously only been released on the band's first demo, Neidermayer's Mind (1993). Also of note is the song "Play Me" which features rapper Nas.

Around this period, guitarist Head was heavily addicted to drugs such as meth. He said "2003 is when I started using speed every day. I [also] got hooked on meth and in order to get up and function, even play a show, I had to snort lines, you know. And I told myself, 'I'll do this tour, I'll do this Ozzfest, and I'll do meth the whole time and I'll go home and check into a rehab.' And it scared me, you know, 'cause I was like coming every month I would tell myself, 'I'm gonna stop this tour,' and I wouldn't be able to do it. Like a fear would come over me. I was just trapped." Regarding the issues facing the band during the recording, guitarist James "Munky" Shaffer recalled "We weren't in the best space. The songs weren't flowing and the creativity was a bit muted from these personal dramas each of us had." He also claimed the album was a forced effort.

Jonathan Davis said "[This album] is about us as a band, taking a look in the mirror and remembering where we came from, remembering our roots, going back to basics," Davis said. "We reflect and look back why we really got into this band to begin with and why we started it. It's to make aggressive, heavy music. Over the years … we were just experimenting. It always was Korn, but it was different spins on what we were doing. So this time we wanted to make an aggressive, heavy album and just kill it. And that's why we've produced it ourselves. Nobody knows Korn better than ourselves." Davis also stated that he felt a return to basics nu metal album was needed in the music industry of 2003. He said "Nothing coming out is really striking me at all. The whole rock and pop punk scene is just stagnant and boring. Music is not imaginative at the moment. The only record I consider remotely interesting is probably the Outkast album, Speakerboxxx/The Love Below. That's really cool and original."

== Critical reception ==
Professional ratings
Aggregate scores
| Source | Rating |
|---|---|
| Metacritic | 49/100 |
Review scores
| Source | Rating |
| AllMusic | 3/5 stars |
| Blender | 2/5 stars |
| Dotmusic | 6/10 |
| Entertainment Weekly | D |
| The Guardian | 2/5 stars |
| Metal Storm | 8.5/10 |
| Mojo | 2/5 stars |
| NME | 3/10 |
| Q | 2/5 stars |
| Rolling Stone | 3.5/5 stars |

According to the review aggregator Metacritic, Take a Look in the Mirror received "mixed or average reviews" based on a weighted average score of 49 out of 100 from 9 critic scores.

AllMusic's Jason Birchmeier states the album is "a little paradoxical, but that's precisely what makes Take a Look in the Mirror so interesting, especially for longtime fans" and goes on to say that "because of the emphasis on brevity and variety (and especially quality), the album's over before you know it and you're left feeling hungry for more Korn." On the contrary, Entertainment Weekly scored the album a D, saying "Korn remain[s] technically proficient, but Take a Look in the Mirror serves only to make the case that the genre has officially screamed itself into caricature." NME gave the album a negative review, criticizing it for being a "self-parody", they wrote "this is an exercise in sterile studio-rock. Meticulously Pro-Tooled, and built almost entirely around bassist Fieldy's relentless, sludgy mid-range, it's an approach that demonstrates little craft and even less actual feeling." In 2005, the album was ranked number 384 in Rock Hard magazine's book of The 500 Greatest Rock & Metal Albums of All Time.

In a 2013 interview, guitarist Head cited Take a Look in the Mirror as "the worst record we did". In 2015, Jonathan Davis also ranked it as his least favourite album in Korn's discography.

== Track listing ==
All songs written by Korn, except where noted.

| No. | Title | Writer(s) | Length |
|---|---|---|---|
| 1. | "Right Now" | | 3:10 |
| 2. | "Break Some Off" | | 2:35 |
| 3. | "Counting on Me" | | 4:49 |
| 4. | "Here It Comes Again" | | 3:33 |
| 5. | "Deep Inside" | | 2:46 |
| 6. | "Did My Time" | | 4:04 |
| 7. | "Everything I've Known" | | 3:34 |
| 8. | "Play Me" (featuring Nas) | Korn, Nasir bin Olu Dara Jones | 3:21 |
| 9. | "Alive" | | 4:29 |
| 10. | "Let's Do This Now" | | 3:18 |
| 11. | "I'm Done" | | 3:23 |
| 12. | "Y'All Want a Single" | | 3:17 |
| 13. | "When Will This End" ( (Note: "When Will This End" ends at 3:39; the hidden track is a live cover of Metallica's "One," which starts after 6 minutes of silence. On digital versions, the hidden track is omitted.)) | | 14:24 |
| Total length: | | | 56:43 |

Deluxe edition DVD
| No. | Title | Length |
|---|---|---|
| 1. | "KoRn Kut Up" (mashup of most of their music videos from 1994 to 2003) | 11:02 |
| 2. | "Right Now (Mirror Mix Music Video)" | 3:21 |
| 3. | "The Untouchables 2002 Tour" (features a live recording of "Here to Stay" and backstage footage) | 15:22 |
| Total length: | | 29:45 |

== Personnel ==
=== Korn ===
- Jonathan Davis – lead vocals, bagpipes
- Head (credited as "Sir Headly") – guitars
- Munky (credited as "James the Gorilla") – guitars
- Fieldy (credited as "Dog") – bass
- David Silveria (credited as "Wally Balljacker") – drums

=== Production ===
- Jonathan Davis – production
- Frank Filipetti – production, engineering, mixing
- Nas – vocals on "Play Me"
- Jim "Bud" Monti – production, engineering
- Tim Harkins – engineering
- Cailan McCarthy – artist coordination
- Doug Erb – art direction
- Brandy Flower – art direction
- Gayle Boulware – art consultant
- Darren Frank – assistant
- Jesse Gorman – assistant
- Peter Katsis – A&R
- Kaz Utsunomiya – A&R
- Rob Hill – editing
- Fred Maher – editing
- Louie Teran – digital editing
- Stephen Marcussen – mastering
- Polarbear – programming on "I'm Done"
- Mitch Ikeda – photography
- Marina Chavez – photography

== Charts ==
=== Weekly charts ===
| Chart (2003) | Peak position |
|---|---|
| Australian Albums (ARIA) | 37 |
| Austrian Albums (Ö3 Austria) | 2 |
| Belgian Albums (Ultratop Flanders) | 24 |
| Belgian Albums (Ultratop Wallonia) | 11 |
| Danish Albums (Hitlisten) | 26 |
| Dutch Albums (Album Top 100) | 21 |
| Finnish Albums (Suomen virallinen lista) | 10 |
| French Albums (SNEP) | 14 |
| German Albums (Offizielle Top 100) | 8 |
| Irish Albums (IRMA) | 25 |
| Italian Albums (FIMI) | 16 |
| New Zealand Albums (RMNZ) | 19 |
| Norwegian Albums (VG-lista) | 27 |
| Polish Albums (ZPAV) | 15 |
| Portuguese Albums (AFP) | 17 |
| Scottish Albums (Official Charts) | 46 |
| Spanish Albums (AFYVE) | 68 |
| Swedish Albums (Sverigetopplistan) | 18 |
| UK Albums (Official Charts) | 53 |
| UK Rock & Metal Albums (Official Charts) | 2 |
| US Billboard 200 | 9 |

=== Year-end charts ===
| Chart (2004) | Position |
|---|---|
| US Billboard 200 | 71 |

== Certifications ==
| Region | Certification | Certified units/sales |
|---|---|---|
| Australia (ARIA) | Gold | 35,000^{^} |
| Germany (BVMI) | Gold | 100,000^{^} |
| United Kingdom (BPI) | Silver | 60,000^{*} |
| United States (RIAA) | Platinum | 1,000,000^{^} |
^{*} Sales figures based on certification alone.^{^} Shipments figures based on certification alone.
