= Right There =

Right There may refer to:

- "Right There" (Nicole Scherzinger song), 2011
- "Right There" (Ariana Grande song), 2013
- "Right There" (Lil Nas X song), 2025
- Right There (film), 2013

== See also ==
- "Right Thurr", a 2003 song by Chingy
