= Did My Time =

Single by Korn

from the album Take a Look in the Mirror
- B-side: "One" (Live)
- Released: July 22, 2003
- Recorded: 2003
- Genre: Nu metal; alternative metal
- Length: 4:04
- Label: Epic
- Songwriters: Reginald Arvizu; Jonathan Davis; James Shaffer; David Silveria; Brian Welch
- Producers: Jonathan Davis; Frank Filipetti

Korn singles chronology
"Alone I Break" (2002)	"Did My Time" (2003)	"Right Now" (2003)

Music video
- "Did My Time" on YouTube

"Did My Time" is a song written and recorded by American nu metal band Korn for the film, Lara Croft: Tomb Raider – The Cradle of Life. It was released as a single in July 2003 in support of the film, and was later featured on the band's sixth studio album, Take a Look in the Mirror.

The song was a staple in the band's live concerts until 2019. "Did My Time" has been performed live about 500 times, making it the second most played song from the album after "Y'All Want a Single".

== Music and structure ==
The song was based on an unfinished idea from the era of 2002's Untouchables. James "Munky" Shaffer had written the main riff and played it frequently during the sessions, but producer Michael Beinhorn did not see potential in it. In early 2003, Korn completed the whole song, and caught the attention of Paramount Pictures who wanted to use it in the film Lara Croft: Tomb Raider – The Cradle of Life. However, the song was only released as a single for the film, and featured during the end credits. It did not appear on the motion picture soundtrack, due to certain clauses in Jonathan Davis's record contract at the time, the same reason why Davis could not release the original versions of the songs he composed for the Queen of the Damned soundtrack, which featured his vocals.

== Music video ==
A video was directed by Dave Meyers, mainly known for his work with rapper Missy Elliott, featuring the star of Lara Croft: Tomb Raider – The Cradle of Life, Angelina Jolie. The video shows Jolie walking through an alley when the ground starts to crack. A black mist rises out of the cracks, which then transforms into the band when the main riff of the song starts. The black mist around them starts to become bigger as the song progresses. At the end of the music video, the band disappears and the cracks disappear as well. Scenes from the movie are shown during the video.

== Awards ==
The song received a nomination at the 2004 Grammy Awards for Best Metal Performance, but lost to Metallica's "St. Anger". This would be Korn's fourth nomination in the aforementioned category and their sixth overall.

== Track listing ==
1. "Did My Time" – 4:04
2. "Did My Time" (The Grayedout mix) – 4:47
3. "One" (live, Metallica cover) – 4:31
  - Recorded live at MTV Icon: Metallica on May 3, 2003, written by James Hetfield and Lars Ulrich.

== Chart performance ==
"Did My Time" became Korn's first and only top forty entry on the Hot 100, peaking at number thirty-eight in August 2003, due to the physical sales of the CD single.

=== Charts ===
Chart (2003)	Peak position
Australia (ARIA)	29
Austria (Ö3 Austria Top 40)	12
Belgium (Ultratop 50 Flanders)	18
Belgium (Ultratop 50 Wallonia)	12
Canada (Nielsen SoundScan)	9
Denmark (Tracklisten)	14
Europe (Eurochart Hot 100)	20
Finland (Suomen virallinen lista)	13
Germany (GfK)	12
German Alternative Singles Chart (Jahrescharts)	4
Iceland (Fréttablaðið Top 20)	1
Ireland (IRMA)	24
Italy (FIMI)	19
Italy (Hit Parade)	35
Latvian Airplay (LAIPA)	21
Netherlands (Single Top 100)	87
Portugal (AFP)	6
Scotland Singles (OCC)	13
Sweden (Sverigetopplistan)	19
Switzerland (Schweizer Hitparade)	17
UK Singles (OCC)	15
UK Rock & Metal (OCC)	1
US Billboard Hot 100	38
US Alternative Airplay (Billboard)	17
US Mainstream Rock (Billboard)	12
