= Right Now (Avgusta song) =

2025 single by Avgusta

Single by Avgusta

from the album Wandering
- Released: September 12, 2025
- Genre: Dance-pop
- Length: 2:51
- Label: Self-released
- Songwriter: Sofiya Avgusta Vasilets
- Producers: Avgusta; Misha Komlev

Music video
- "Right Now" on YouTube

"Right Now" (stylized in all caps) is the debut single by singer Avgusta, released on September 12, 2025. It was produced by Avgusta herself and Misha Komlev.

== Background ==
Avgusta has explained that she has been wronged, humiliated, bullied and betrayed by many people in her life, and that others have distanced themselves from her to fit in. However, these people began attempting to contact and hang out with her once they learned of her success, which is the central theme of the song. Avgusta composed the song to empower and motivate people who have had similar experiences, while also intending it to be danceable. When Avgusta had the idea of the song, she created the beat on her laptop and improvisationally sang what came to her mind. She sent the track to her sound engineer Misha Komlev, who refined the production and mixed and mastered it.

== Composition ==
"Right Now" is a dance-pop song, and has been considered reminiscent of 2000s pop. It contains a deep bassline, synthesizers and pulsing beat. Avgusta performs in rhythmic, "rap-like" cadences and delivery, and displays a great vocal range that spans both low and high registers, especially on the chorus. She exhibits a resilient, defiant tone, as she lyrically addresses the people who mistreated her and/or took advantage of her kindness in the past, only to return to her when she achieved success.

== Critical reception ==
Victoria Polsely of Earmilk remarked "Sonically, 'RIGHT NOW' pulses with deep, hypnotic basslines, glimmering synths, and an invigorating club-ready beat. The soaring chorus highlights AVGUSTA's dynamic vocal range, equal parts soulful and fierce, while the production radiates the kind of energy built for late-night dance floors and emotional breakthroughs alike. It's a perfect blend of vulnerability and power, wrapped in sleek, radio-ready pop." Paul K. Barnes of Billboard Africa wrote "Her strong vocals and songwriting are displayed throughout the single which combine well with the upbeat 2000's pop like production."

== Music video ==
The music video was directed by Jon Vulpine. It sees Avgusta at a "vibrant party", on the beach, and surrounded by fire dancers, while a subplot centers on a rude girl following her.
