= Y'All Want a Single =

Single by Korn

from the album Take a Look in the Mirror
- Released: March 9, 2004
- Genre: Nu metal; rap metal
- Length: 3:17
- Label: Immortal/Epic
- Songwriters: Reginald Arvizu, Jonathan Davis, James Shaffer, David Silveria, Brian Welch
- Producers: Jonathan Davis, Korn

Korn singles chronology
"Right Now" (2003)	"Y'All Want a Single" (2004)	"Everything I've Known" (2004)

Music video
- "Y'All Want a Single" on YouTube

"Y'All Want a Single" is a song written and recorded by American nu metal band Korn for their sixth studio album, Take a Look in the Mirror. It was released as the album's third single in March 2004, chosen by fans through a poll on the band's official forum.

== Overview ==
=== Lyrics ===
At a running time of three minutes and 17 seconds, the song contains 89 uses of the word "fuck" with the repeated line "Y'all want a single, say fuck that - fuck that fuck that", although the radio edit replaces the word "fuck" with "suck", as well as replacing "Fuck that shit" with "Suck on it."

=== Concept ===
In an interview with Metal Hammer in November 2003, guitarist James Shaffer said:

"We were recording this album before we went to Ozzfest. We had 10 songs written and recorded, but we weren't feeling it would be the whole album. We wanted to add 3 or 4 more songs, so we came back to record them. Then our record company was like 'Hey, we'd really love to have a single' and our management, The Firm said 'We would really like to have a smash hit single, man, can you dig it?'. We were really appalled by that scene. They wanted 'Got the Life' or 'Freak on a Leash', and that shit wasn't flying with us at all! For the first time in our lives we were dissecting our music, and trying to analyze the structure of those songs, trying to figure out what made them huge hits. But Korn never works like that, and while we were all wondering, Jonathan came up with a line: 'Y'all want a single? Say: FUCK THAT' and we wrote Y'All Want a Single as a big 'fuck you' to them. Damn, Jonathan is really good at motivating us this way." – James Shaffer

=== Music video ===
The video, directed by Andrews Jenkins, presents a mob of fans destroying a record store with statements about the music industry displayed throughout. The video begins with all of the members of Korn entering the record store and destroying all of the music CDs and tapes and dismantling the racks and shelves that they are stored on. As the video moves along, facts criticizing the music industry and major label companies flash across the screen. One caption announces the video itself cost $150,000 to make, a budget smaller than many major label releases at the time. They state opinions based on the idea that the corporate nature of the music industry is questionable.

Captions in the music video:

Music Monopoly?
One Corporation Owns The 5 Major Video Channels In The U.S.
Is That OK?
Last Year The BIG 5 Record Labels Together Sold About $25 Billion Dollars Of Music.
90% Of Releases On Major Labels DO NOT Make A Profit.
Britney Spears' Last Video Cost $1,000,000.
This Korn Video Costs $150,000.
You Have Seen $48,000 Worth Of Video.
Will Any Music Channel Play This Video?
The Music "Industry" Releases 100 Songs Per Week.
Only 4 Songs Are Added To The Average Radio "Playlist" Each Week.
Hit Songs On TOP 40 Are Often REPEATED Over 100 Times A Week.
Is That All You Want To Hear?
Why Is A Song Worth $.99
Do You Download Songs?
Steal This Video.
This Is A Single.
Two Radio Comglomerates (sic) Control 42% Of Listeners.
The Record Company Wanted Us To Change This Video. We Didn't.
Y'all Want A Single. (title)
90% Of All Songs Get To "The Hook" Within 20 Seconds.
98% Of All #1 Singles Are Less Than 3 Minutes and 30 Seconds Long.
Does This Seem Like A Formula To You?
With All This Said...
We Love Making Music.
Is This The Music "Business"?
Is That OK?
Thank You For Your 3 Minutes Of Time
Music Monopoly?
Love, Korn

== Track listing ==
UK Maxi-Single (promo)

1. "Y'All Want a Single" – 3:17
2. "Y'All Want a Single (Suck That Clean Version)" – 3:19

== Charts ==
Chart (2004)	Peak position
Iceland (Fréttablaðið Top 20)	1
US Mainstream Rock (Billboard)	23
