= Right Now (Korn song) =

Single by Korn

from the album Take a Look in the Mirror
- Released: October 7, 2003
- Recorded: 2003
- Genre: Nu metal; funk metal
- Length: 3:10
- Label: Epic
- Songwriter: Korn
- Producers: Jonathan Davis; Korn

Korn singles chronology
"Did My Time" (2003)	"Right Now" (2003)	"Y'All Want a Single" (2004)

Music video
- "Right Now" on YouTube

"Right Now" is a song written and recorded by American nu metal band Korn for their sixth studio album, Take a Look in the Mirror. It was released as the album's official first single in October 2003.

== Concept ==
"It’s about basically me waking up pissed off at the world, hating everyone and everything around me. I think everyone’s had one of those days when you wake up and you don’t want to talk to no one and you’re just pissed. I had one of those days and I wrote about it. I was venting out all of my frustrations towards everyone." – Jonathan Davis.

== Chart performance ==
"Right Now" peaked at number 11 and number 13 on Billboard's Mainstream Rock Songs and Alternative Songs, respectively. The single was also released in the United Kingdom and Australia, but it failed to chart in both countries.

=== Charts ===
Chart (2003)	Peak position
German Alternative Singles Chart (Jahrescharts)	6
US Bubbling Under Hot 100 (Billboard)	19
US Modern Rock Tracks (Billboard)	13
US Mainstream Rock Tracks (Billboard)	11

== Music video ==
The video was chosen through an online contest which encouraged fans and independent directors to create the video from scratch. However, this version of "Right Now", by Internet user Junoon, never officially aired on television. A version containing grotesque animation from Lloyd's Lunchbox, a series of cartoons that were created by Spike & Mike's Animation, received heavy airplay on MTV2's Headbangers Ball, whereas a "mirror mix" directed by Nathan Cox was included on limited pressings of Take a Look in the Mirror.

The Lunchbox version of the video depicts Lloyd, a mentally-ill boy who does such harmful and gross things to his body, such as squeezing his eyeball, removing his fingernails, eating the pus from his acne, and sneezing out his lungs. At the end, Lloyd's skull is pulled out when he swings the door shut with a string tied to his teeth.
