= The Path of Totality Tour =

2011–12 concert tour by Korn

- Tour by Korn
- Promotional poster for the tour
- Location: North America; Europe; Asia
- Associated album: The Path of Totality
- Start date: November 3, 2011
- End date: December 1, 2012
- Legs: 7
- No. of shows: 57 in North America; 30 in Europe; 3 in Asia; 90 in total

Korn concert chronology
- Music as a Weapon V (2011); The Path of Totality Tour (2011–12); Reunion Tour with Head (2013)

The Path of Totality Tour was a concert tour in support of Korn's tenth studio album of the same name. The tour kicked off on November 3, 2011 in Boston, Massachusetts. Supporting acts for the first North American leg of the tour were Downlink, Datsik, and Dope D.O.D. Kill the Noise and Sluggo each opened certain dates of the second North American leg; Jonathan Davis' dubstep side project, JDevil, performed on all dates. Downlink, JDevil, and The Dirty Youth were among the opening acts for the European leg.

The tour continued overseas in Europe on March 12, 2012, following an appearance at the SmokeOut Festival in San Bernardino, California with Cypress Hill.

On May 5, 2012, former guitarist Brian Welch joined the band onstage for the first time in seven years at the Carolina Rebellion Festival.

The tour saw its final Leg on December 1, 2012 as part of the Shiprocked Cruise. It was also Korn's last tour as a quartet before original guitarist Brian Welch returned to the band in 2013.

== Setlist ==
North America
1. "Predictable"
2. "Lies"
3. "No Place to Hide"
4. "Proud"
5. "Narcissistic Cannibal"
6. "Kill Mercy Within"
7. "My Wall"
8. "Get Up!"
9. "Way Too Far"
10. "Here to Stay"
11. "Freak on a Leash"
12. "Falling Away from Me"
13. "Another Brick in the Wall"

Encore

14. "Shoots and Ladders" / "One"
15. "Got the Life"
16. "Blind"
North America, Leg II
1. "Predictable"
2. "Lies"
3. "No Place to Hide"
4. "Helmet in the Bush"
5. "Narcissistic Cannibal"
6. "Chaos Lives in Everything"
7. "My Wall"
8. "Get Up!"
9. "Way Too Far"
10. "Here to Stay"
11. "Freak on a Leash"
12. "Falling Away from Me"
13. "Another Brick in the Wall"

Encore

14. "Shoots and Ladders" / "One"
15. "Got the Life"
16. "Blind"
Europe
1. "Predictable"
2. "Lies"
3. "No Place to Hide"
4. "Good God"
5. "Narcissistic Cannibal"
6. "Kill Mercy Within"
7. "Chaos Lives in Everything"
8. "My Wall"
9. "Get Up!"
10. "Way Too Far"
11. "Here to Stay"
12. "Freak on a Leash"
13. "Falling Away from Me"
14. "Oildale (Leave Me Alone)"
15. "Another Brick in the Wall"

Encore

16. "Shoots and Ladders" / "One"
17. "Got the Life"
18. "Blind"
North America, Leg III
1. "Divine"
2. "Predictable"
3. "No Place to Hide"
4. "Good God"
5. "Narcissistic Cannibal"
6. "Kill Mercy Within"
7. "Chaos Lives in Everything"
8. "My Wall"
9. "Get Up!"
10. "Way Too Far"
11. "Here to Stay"
12. "Freak on a Leash"
13. "Did My Time"
14. "Falling Away from Me"
15. "Another Brick in the Wall"

Encore

16. "Shoots and Ladders" / "One"
17. "Got the Life"
18. "Blind"
Europe, Leg II
1. "Divine"
2. "Predictable"
3. "No Place to Hide"
4. "Good God"
5. "Narcissistic Cannibal"
6. "Kill Mercy Within"
7. "Chaos Lives in Everything"
8. "My Wall"
9. "Get Up!"
10. "Way Too Far"
11. "Here to Stay"
12. "Freak on a Leash"
13. "Falling Away from Me"
14. "Another Brick in the Wall"

Encore

16. "Shoots and Ladders" / "One"
17. "Got the Life"
18. "Blind"

Other songs

"Let's Go" was performed once at the Boston show. "Coming Undone" had been listed on the setlist for Boston but it was not performed for unspecified reasons. "Proud" was a staple on the tour's first North American leg; it has since been replaced. "Illuminati" was played during The Path of Totality's album release party at the Hollywood Palladium. "Somebody Someone" was played once in Oberhausen, only to be replaced with "Oildale (Leave Me Alone)" at the next show. "Porno Creep" was played at the Indianapolis show, but has since been omitted from the set list, but was played at the Gurgaon show in Delhi, NCR in India.

Jonathan Davis confirmed via video chat that "B.B.K." is performed during rehearsals for the tour but is difficult to pull off live and may be performed in the future.

== Tour dates ==
Date	City	Country	Venue
North America
November 3, 2011	Boston	United States	House of Blues
November 4, 2011	New York City	United States	Roseland Ballroom
November 5, 2011	Upper Darby Township	United States	Tower Theater
November 6, 2011	Huntington	United States	Paramount Theater
November 9, 2011	Miami Beach	United States	The Fillmore Miami Beach
November 10, 2011	Hollywood	United States	Hard Rock Live
November 11, 2011	Tampa	United States	Green Iguana
November 12, 2011	Duluth	United States	Wild Bill's
November 16, 2011	Tulsa	United States	Brady Theater
November 18, 2011	San Antonio	United States	Sunken Garden Amphitheatre
November 19, 2011	Houston	United States	Verizon Wireless Theater
November 20, 2011	Dallas	United States	Palladium Ballroom
December 6, 2011	Los Angeles	United States	Hollywood Palladium
North America, Leg II
February 23, 2012	Detroit	United States	The Fillmore Detroit
February 24, 2012	Chicago	United States	Congress Theater
February 25, 2012	Milwaukee	United States	Eagles Ballroom
February 27, 2012	Denver	United States	Fillmore Auditorium
February 28, 2012	Salt Lake City	United States	The Complex
March 1, 2012	Phoenix	United States	Comerica Theatre
March 2, 2012	Paradise	United States	Palms Casino Resort
March 3, 2012	San Bernardino	United States	Orange Pavilion
March 4, 2012	San Francisco	United States	The Warfield
Europe
March 12, 2012	Paris	France	Bataclan
March 14, 2012	Oberhausen	Germany	Turbinenhalle
March 15, 2012	Esch-sur-Alzette	Luxembourg	Rockhal
March 16, 2012	Offenbach am Main	Germany	Stadthalle Offenbach
March 18, 2012	Milan	Italy	Alcatraz
March 19, 2012	Zürich	Switzerland	Volkshaus
March 20, 2012	Amsterdam	Netherlands	Paradiso
March 23, 2012	Brussels	Belgium	Ancienne Belgique
March 25, 2012	London	United Kingdom	O_{2} Academy Brixton
March 26, 2012	Birmingham	United Kingdom	O_{2} Academy Birmingham
March 28, 2012	Manchester	United Kingdom	Manchester Academy
March 29, 2012	Glasgow	Scotland	O_{2} Academy Glasgow
March 31, 2012	Belfast	United Kingdom	Mandela Hall
April 1, 2012	Dublin	Ireland	Olympia Theatre
April 3, 2012	Bristol	United Kingdom	O_{2} Academy Bristol
North America, Leg III
April 20, 2012	Lubbock	United States	Lonestar Amphitheater
April 21, 2012	The Woodlands	United States	The Woodlands Pavilion
April 23, 2012	Dallas	United States	Palladium Ballroom
April 24, 2012	Pharr	United States	Pharr Entertainment Center
April 26, 2012	San Antonio	United States	Hemisphere Park
April 27, 2012	Corpus Christi	United States	Concrete Street Amphitheater
April 29, 2012	Jacksonville	United States	Welcome To Rockville Festival
April 30, 2012	Knoxville	United States	Tennessee Theater
May 2, 2012	Indianapolis	United States	Egyptian Room
May 3, 2012	Rochester	United States	Main Street Armory
May 4, 2012	Silver Spring	United States	The Filmore
May 5, 2012	Rockingham	United States	Carolina Rebellion
May 7, 2012	Providence	United States	Heartbreak Hotel
May 8, 2012	Huntington	United States	The Paramount
May 10, 2012	Sayreville	United States	The Starland Ballroom
June 13, 2012	Atlantic City	United States	House of Blues
June 15, 2012	Montebello	Canada	Petite-Nation Rockfest
June 16, 2012	Hampton	United States	Hampton Beach Casino
June 17, 2012	Wallingford	United States	The Dome
June 19, 2012	Pittsburgh	United States	Stage AE
June 20, 2012	Fort Wayne	United States	Piere's Entertainment Center
June 22, 2012	West Des Moines	United States	Val Air Ballroom
June 23, 2012	Kansas City	United States	Uptown Theater
June 24, 2012	Maplewood	United States	The Myth
June 25, 2012	Fargo	United States	The Venue
June 27, 2012	Missoula	United States	The Wilma Theater
June 29, 2012	Dawson Creek	Canada	Encana Events Center
June 30, 2012	Gibbons	Canada	Boonstock
July 28, 2012	Madison	United States	Alliant Energy Center Memorial Coliseum
July 29, 2012	Syracuse	United States	New York State Fairgrounds
Europe, Leg II
August 3, 2012	Veselovka	Russia	Kubana Festival
August 5, 2012	Burgas	Bulgaria	Spirit of Burgas Festival
August 8, 2012	Tolmin	Slovenia	Metalcamp
August 9, 2012	Budapest	Hungary	Sziget Festival
August 11, 2012	Puttlingen	Germany	Rocco Del Schlacko Festival
August 12, 2012	Eschwege	Germany	Open Air Festival
August 15, 2012	Warsaw	Poland	Sowinskiego Park
August 17, 2012	Vienna	Austria	Frequency Festival
August 18, 2012	Trutnov	Czech Republic	Trutnov Open Air Festival
August 21, 2012	Moscow	Russia	Stadium Live
August 23, 2012	Saint Petersburg	Russia	Glavclub
August 25, 2012	Novosibirsk	Russia	Expo Centre
August 27, 2012	Ekaterinburg	Russia	Uralets Arena
August 30, 2012	Kyiv	Ukraine	Stereoplaza
August 31, 2012	Riga	Latvia	Riga Arena
Asia
September 5, 2012	Gurgaon	India	Leisure Valley Grounds
September 7, 2012	Mumbai	India	MMRDA Grounds
September 9, 2012	Bangalore	India	Clarks Exotica

== Broadcasts and recordings ==
An official release party for The Path of Totality took place on December 6 at the Hollywood Palladium, and featured several producers who worked on the album. This included Skrillex performing "Get Up!" and "Narcissistic Cannibal" on guitar with the band. This event was filmed for a DVD release, which will also be available in 3D and Blu-ray formats. The March 20 show in Amsterdam was specially streamed live on Korn's website and official Facebook page; the stream brought in a staggering 750,000 viewers online and may have a future DVD release.

Korn was scheduled to perform in Los Angeles at the 2012 Revolver Golden Gods Awards on April 11, but the band had to cancel due to Jonathan Davis' knee injury.

Korn: The Path of Totality Tour – Live at the Hollywood Palladium was released on DVD and Blu-ray on September 4, 2012 by Shout! Factory.

== VIP packages ==
The tour offered special Limited VIP Packages which will vary in price. Packages available include a Guitar VIP Experience, Double Platinum VIP Experience (fans can choose of three different types: Listing session, Gaming session, or a drum lesson), Platinum VIP Experience, and Gold VIP Experience.
