= Oildale (Leave Me Alone) =

- Cover according to Roadrunner Records.

Single by Korn

from the album Korn III: Remember Who You Are
- Released: May 4, 2010
- Genre: Nu metal
- Length: 4:43 (album version); 4:12 (radio edit)
- Label: Roadrunner
- Songwriters: Reginald Arvizu; Jonathan Davis; Ray Luzier; Ross Robinson; James Shaffer
- Producer: Ross Robinson

Korn singles chronology
"Haze" (2008)	"Oildale (Leave Me Alone)" (2010)	"Let the Guilt Go" (2010)

Music video
- "Oildale (Leave Me Alone)" on YouTube

"Oildale (Leave Me Alone)" is the lead single from Korn's ninth studio album, Korn III: Remember Who You Are. It is the first single with new drummer Ray Luzier. It was first played live on March 26, 2010 for fans in Anchorage, Alaska. "Oildale (Leave Me Alone)" netted 1.9 million first-week audience impressions over 79 radio stations. The full version of the song was available digitally on May 25, 2010. The song was performed on Jimmy Kimmel Live! on July 14, 2010.

== Music and structure ==
It was stated in an article by Roadrunner Records that "'Oildale (Leave Me Alone)' buzzes with an eerie clean guitar that slowly gives way to a steamrolling bass and riff assault."

== Music video ==
The video for "Oildale (Leave Me Alone)" aired on May 31 on MTV2. The video portrays a young boy living in the poverty stricken town of Oildale, California. Throughout the video it shows the boy collecting money, riding his bike through the town, and shows glimpses of the other residences, while Korn is seen performing in an oilfield, and in an alley in front ruins of a burnt house. Also, there is a direct reference to the first album cover art, where two men are fighting by a swingset while a little girl watches, and is seemingly abducted by the victor.

== Chart performance ==
"Oildale (Leave Me Alone)" debuted at number 25 on Billboard's Mainstream Rock Songs chart, number 41 on Rock Songs, and number 33 on Alternative Songs. It would go on to peak at number 10 on Mainstream Rock Songs, number 26 on Rock Songs, and number 29 on Alternative Songs. Regarding the latter chart, "Oildale (Leave Me Alone)" tied the record for the most charting songs without reaching number one, with eighteen songs total. Godsmack first achieved this record with "Cryin' Like a Bitch!" in March 2010. Godsmack released a follow-up single, "Love-Hate-Sex-Pain", which reclaimed the record in September 2010, only to be tied yet again by "Get Up!", the lead single from The Path of Totality.

== Charts ==
Chart (2010)	Peak position
Australia (ARIA)	89
Czech Republic Rock (IFPI)	4
US Alternative Songs (Billboard)	29
US Rock Songs (Billboard)	26
US Mainstream Rock Songs (Billboard)	10

== Personnel ==
Korn

- Jonathan Davis – vocals
- James Shaffer – guitars, lap steel
- Reginald Arvizu – bass
- Ray Luzier – drums

Technical

- Ross Robinson – production
