= Korn III: Remember Who You Are =

Studio album by Korn
- Released: July 13, 2010
- Recorded: April–November 2009
- Studios: Korn Studios, Los Angeles
- Genre: Nu metal
- Length: 44:40
- Label: Roadrunner
- Producer: Ross Robinson

Korn chronology
Untitled (2007)	Korn III: Remember Who You Are (2010)	The Path of Totality (2011)

Special edition
- Special edition with DVD

Singles from Korn III: Remember Who You Are
- 1. "Oildale (Leave Me Alone)" Released: May 4, 2010; 2. "Let the Guilt Go" Released: July 26, 2010

Korn III: Remember Who You Are is the ninth studio album by American nu metal band Korn. It was released on July 13, 2010. It is the band's second album recorded as a quartet since their 2005 album See You on the Other Side. Vocalist Jonathan Davis stated that the album is "simple" due to the absence of the multi-layered effects present in the band's other albums; he added that the album is "about the vibe". The album features a return to their roots. It is their first album since 1996's Life Is Peachy to be produced by Ross Robinson, as well as their first to feature drummer Ray Luzier, who was previously a fill-in member.

== Background ==
Following the release of its untitled eighth album (July 2007) with Virgin Records, Korn embarked upon a ten-month hiatus, allowing band members to focus on solo projects.

Guitarist James "Munky" Shaffer's side project, Fear and the Nervous System, began recording a debut album. In July, Shaffer reported on the band's MySpace page that the album would not be released August 8, 2008 as previously mentioned. Bassist Reginald "Fieldy" Arvizu recorded guitars for StillWell's debut album Dirtbag. Davis recorded his first solo album along with his back-up band the SFA's who also backed Davis on his Alone I Play tour. StillWell's debut, Dirtbag, was released on May 10, 2011, while the remaining two solo albums were expected to be released sometime in 2011.

When getting back into the studio for the recording of the band's ninth studio album, Korn again hired Robinson, whom the band had previously worked with on Korn and Life Is Peachy, to act as producer. They also hired Luzier, whom they had previously toured with, to replace former drummer David Silveria. This was Luzier's first appearance on a Korn album. During this time, the band was unsigned and funded the recording of the album and the Escape from the Studio tour themselves.

== Writing and recording ==
In the early stages of production, Luzier, Arvizu, and Shaffer wrote material for the album in Arvizu's garage. During this time, Davis had purposely avoided hearing the band's new material, stating that he would work on lyrics after the music was recorded. The band reported that it had written about fifteen or sixteen tracks of original material. According to Arvizu, the band had planned to play new material on tour, but abandoned the idea due to the amount of material that had emerged during the recording sessions.

After the conclusion of the band's Escape from the Studio tour in late 2009 the band returned to the studio with Robinson to begin recording. While the band's previous album had been more experimental and contained keyboards performed by touring member Zac Baird to give their music more atmosphere, the album was recorded as a four-piece band with guitars and lap steel. Unlike the band's more recent albums, the music was recorded with an analog 24-track tape machine and without the use of Pro Tools, similar to the band's first albums. In addition to the songs already written by Shaffer, Arvizu and Luzier, Davis wrote eleven songs in less than five days. He recorded demos of his songs, playing guitar and bass himself over a programmed drum beat. He presented the demos to the rest of the band, who played the material live, to "add their own flavor to the songs", according to Davis. Shaffer later revealed that "The Past" and "Never Around" were based on re-written riffs from Davis' demos. While the band had access to a large recording studio, Robinson insisted that the album was recorded in a small 8' x 8' cubicle nicknamed "the catbox" originally intended for recording guitars.

Jonathan Davis stated in 2017 that he feels this album was the band's biggest mistake. Davis said: "I think going backwards rather than forwards might have been the biggest mistake we made as a band. I think it would have been a much better album if Ross hasn't been so fucking hard, and let us have a bit of fun. There was a song I wrote about my wife, when she was having problems with a pill addiction. Ross called her without me knowing and asked her to show up to the studio, and I had to sing that part to her. "He pushes your buttons on purpose to get those kind of performances. He wants you to get so fucking mad, the emotions just come pouring out. I get it – but I don't necessarily want to be a part of it now I've been there and done that." Despite his love and respect for Robinson, Davis adds: "That record sounds forced to me, and it took me to a very dark place that I didn't want to go back to." Robinson later expressed regret over his treatment of Davis during the recording of Korn III, stating that he "[pushed] too hard, and it had the opposite effect".

== Composition and themes ==
In April 2009, Davis revealed that he was planning to make the album a concept album, that was to lyrically revolve around the concept of five symbols that Davis identified as the "downfall of man". One of these symbols was organized religion, something that Davis felt were responsible for a lot of things that have gone wrong in the world today. The other symbols were drugs, power, money and time. In September 2009, Davis said that his idea for a concept album was not turning out as he had intended. He proposed that, instead, he was just going to sing however he felt at that moment. Davis also communicated the album would combine the "raw catharsis of early Korn records" with the "storytelling [of recent records]".

I wanted it to start out as a concept album but now there are other things coming up that I want to talk about. I don't know necessarily if the concept's going to stick or not ... It's weird. I've been humming my lyrics along with the band as they play. I haven't done that in forever. We'd usually do our parts separately, and then I'd do my thing over the music after the song was done. We've been writing altogether as a band this time. I've been freestyling all of these lyrics that aren't necessarily about the five things I initially came up with for the album's concept. It's total freestyling—complete stream-of-consciousness. I'm really digging it. I might just go with what's coming out of my body at that moment...

— Jonathan Davis

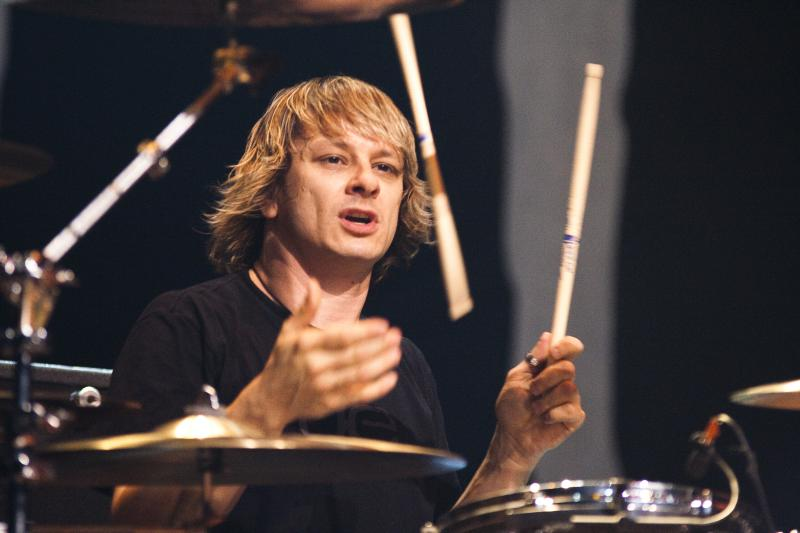
Korn III: Remember Who You Are was the band's first album recorded with drummer Ray Luzier, who joined the band in 2007.

Davis also proposed that the album would recall their early albums, using a vibe that didn't sound over-produced. He elaborated, "We're not trying to do Korn II, or Life Is Peachy II, but it's just to have that vibe back where it's not too over-produced. Just slamming people's faces, like we did back, in '94, '95, and '96." Davis concluded that the album would be simple, rather than complicated as he suggested their previous few albums were. In April 2010 Davis revealed that topics for songs were "about me living my life for others when I shouldn't, people-pleasing all of the time, stress, guilt and all kinds of emotions we live with everyday that destroy us and tear us down. I write about all of the fake people around us and how I always try to fix other people's problems. I write what I feel, and it comes out naturally. I've got a lot of shit built up inside me; that doesn't go away."

During the recording of the album Shaffer used several vintage guitars, echos, long delays, effect pedals and reverbs as well as employing fingerpicking during certain instrumental passages. Shaffer commented, "When we did the first two records, we broke the music down to a completely emotional beast. Through the years, we started to experiment with vocal harmonies and more orchestrated pieces. Recording this album, we brought that knowledge into the raw emotion of what we already knew. You hear the melodies and layers, but it still comes from a very primitive Korn." Luzier's drum parts were recorded without the use of a click track allowing the band to change tempo as a song progressed. Robinson heavily involved himself in drum recording and composition, often deliberately interrupting Luzier mid-take. Shaffer commented that this was done to make Luzier understand the obstacles Korn had to overcome. Luzier commented "The first week or so, I was having a hard time with it. I wanted to strangle the guy. He was punching cymbals, kicking stands, screaming. On a couple of tracks on the record, you can actually hear him yelling. He would come up and push my arm on a fill. It was intense." Luzier also earned the nickname "Dr. Octopus" during the recording process because many of his drum takes demanded that he cross his arms to reach different drums and cymbals. Luzier commented that his playing was different from his previous work, particularly the album's first single – "Oildale (Leave Me Alone)" – which Luzier described, saying "[that] groove is so weird and odd for me to play, so I would come up with my own ideas but Ross would alter them. Some of them he would try to take in another direction, or if I was hitting the kick on the down, he would say, 'What if you put all the kicks on the upbeats and hit the downbeat with the floor tom instead?' The "Oildale" song is just that. The main groove of it is me hitting the floor tom and all the kicks are on the upbeats" Davis also remarked that he "didn't stack four or five vocal parts like" he usually does. He's "singing one part for every song, which was scary." It's just him "and the microphone, and you can really hear the emotion".

== Title, artwork and packaging ==
During the recording process the band referred to the album as Korn III – a reference to the band's early material – later the title of the album was extended to Korn III – Remember Who You Are. Davis explained that meaning of the album's title with: "It comes down to one question: 'Who the fuck am I?' It's about remembering where we came from. The title sums up everything I'm talking about lyrically." Shaffer commented, "You can lose focus of why you wanted to start playing music in the beginning because you can get caught up in the money and the fame and the traveling. It's kind of like, 'OK, let's hit the reset button'." Drummer Ray Luzier related in an interview with Altsounds:

Well, it's exactly what it reads as — it's "Korn III" because it's our third album with [producer] Ross Robinson. It's not like we're trying to start a new generation of Korn or anything, but I'm a permanent member now it feels like a mini fresh start. "Remember Who You Are"? Well, we're not in the giant comfy recording studio that we're used to, we tried not to be too overproduced and really tried to capture our passion. That's pretty much what this whole record's about. There was nothing like, "Let's try and play our instruments perfectly." It was much more, "Let's just rock this," and we played what we felt like at the time. It's all about the passion. I kind of miss that. You hear so many records nowadays that just sound perfect, and when you see the band live they're very untidy. You're just left with this feeling of, "Why? That sucks!" [laughs] When we play our songs live, they sound just like the album, except with an added energy of the live scenario. We're kind of proud of that.

— Ray Luzier, "The Lowdown: Ray Luzier of Korn"

On May 14, the artwork for the album was revealed on Roadrunner Records official website. The front photo was shot in Oildale, California, described by Roadrunner Records as a "gripping image". Jay DiNitto from Noisecreep awarded it "album cover of the week", which was noted as "is less elaborate, embracing a minimalism with a simple photo". DiNitto compared the cover, where an old man in a vehicle approaches a confused young girl, to Korn's earlier album's Life Is Peachy and their debut album Korn - which respectively show a little boy seeing himself in a mirror where a shadowed presence looms behind, and a little girl bringing her swing to a stop to squint at a menacing man standing before her - saying all three depict a child abuse theme.

== Promotion ==
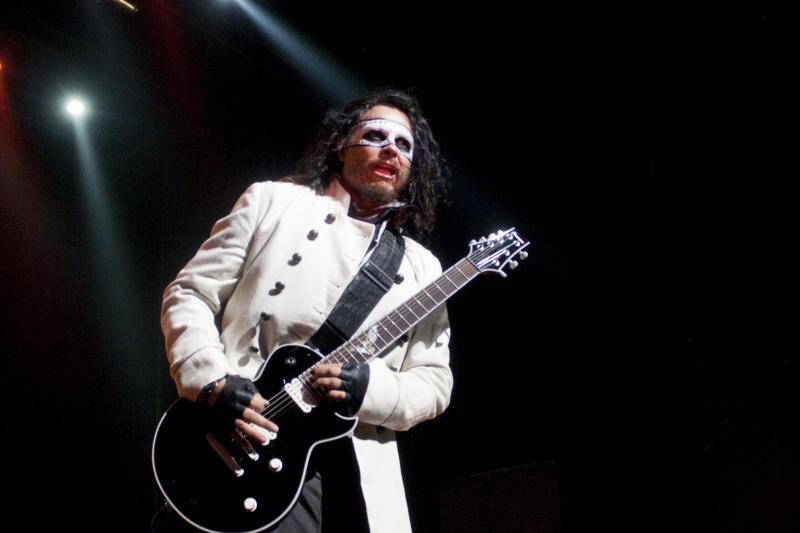
James Shaffer performing in São Paulo, Brazil in 2010

In August 2009, Korn announced plans to release a three-track EP featuring an instrumental demo from the upcoming album. The EP was released digitally exclusively to premium-paying members of Korn's website on September 28, 2009. The band allowed premium members to view live studio production sessions via webcam. Shaffer revealed in an interview that the band intended to embark on an 18-month world tour to promote the album, starting in February. In January 2010, Kevin Lyman revealed that Korn would headline the Rockstar Mayhem Festival tour, throughout North America along with Rob Zombie, Lamb of God and Five Finger Death Punch. Davis later revealed plans for the Ballroom Blitz Tour, a concert tour featuring 2Cents, held in smaller venues similar to the band's first tours. On May 27, Roadrunner Records released a free MP3 download for the song "Are You Ready to Live?" but only for a 24-hour period. On March 26, 2010, Korn performed the first single from the album, entitled "Oildale (Leave Me Alone)", at their show in Anchorage, Alaska. On July 1, 2010, the band were musical guests on Jimmy Kimmel Live! where they performed "Oildale (Leave Me Alone)" and "Let the Guilt Go".

In July a number of viral videos were released by the band, the first two videos included amateur footage of crop circles and UFO, while the second two videos included news footage of the phenomenons identifying its location as Kern County. The Korn logo could also be seen in one of the crop circles. On July 7, the band announced Korn Live: The Encounter, A Concert for Korn III: Remember Who You Are, a live concert filmed on June 24 at the crop circles. It was the band's first live album to feature drummer Ray Luzier who joined the band in 2007, as well as their second to last live album recorded as a quartet before original guitarist Brian Welch returns to the band in 2013. The concert premiered via HDNet on July 11, and the day after via MySpace. The unusual setting for the concert was inspired by Pink Floyd's 1972 Live at Pompeii concert. The 80-minute concert included several songs from the upcoming album, as well as older songs and fan favorites. Davis noted that "the setting and the mood took us into a totally new direction musically. We took the opportunity to stretch out and experiment with the performance" while Shaffer described it as "a new frontier musically for Korn".

== Release and critical reception ==
Professional ratings
Aggregate scores
Source	Rating
Metacritic	57/100
Review scores
Source	Rating
AllMusic	2.5/5 stars
Billboard	4/5 stars
Consequence of Sound	2/5 stars
Kerrang!	4/5 stars
Metal Hammer	9/10
PopMatters	3/10 stars
Rock Sound	8/10
Rolling Stone	2.5/5 stars
Slant Magazine	2/5 stars
Spin	3.5/5 stars

In an interview in October 2009, Shaffer revealed that the band had discussed options for releasing the album, with or without a record label. He mentioned releasing the songs three at a time on the Internet, on a USB drive or on CD, or possibly all three options. While no official release date had been set, Shaffer hinted at February 2010. In December 2009, Davis revealed that the recording of the album was complete and that the album was targeted for a June 2010 release. In January 2010, a video of the band recording the song "Are You Ready to Live?" (under the demo title "My Time") was leaked, uploaded copies of the song and video, which were described as "old school Korn".

On March 15, in the announcement of the Ballroom Blitz Tour, the album title was also revealed to be "Korn III: Remember Who You Are". In March 2010, Shaffer revealed via an online chat with fans that Korn had chosen to sign with Roadrunner Records. This was later confirmed by Davis who called the label "a good home [for Korn]" and added that "they're one of the last real, respected labels left... We looked at all the other options and didn't want to go down that road again." Davis also explained that the band ultimately decided to abandon the idea of releasing the album independently, "We could do it on our own, but it's so complicated with all the business aspects and marketing and all that other stuff that I'm never really into..."

The album was released on July 6, 2010, in Japan, and Australia and Germany three days later. The album was to be released on July 13 in the United Kingdom, the same day where it was shipped in North America and New Zealand, but this date was pushed back to July 12. The album was released on July 20 in Mexico.

According to the review aggregator Metacritic, Korn III: Remember Who You Are received "mixed or average reviews" based on a weighted average score of 57 out of 100 from 12 critic scores. AllMusic's Stephen Thomas Erlewine, who was very critical of 2007's untitled album, noted that "They've gone back to the coiled, furious sputter of their debut but there's no disguising that Korn is an older band, substituting precision for frenzy without diluting their power", originally giving the album a 4 out of 5 rating (later revised to a 2.5). Giles Moorhouse of Rock Sound gave the album an 8 out of 10 rating and noted that "Let the Guilt Go" is "an absolute monster and will easily go toe-to-toe against mosh anthems like Slipknot's 'Duality' and Drowning Pool's 'Bodies' without breaking a sweat". BBC's Louis Pattison had a different take on the band's back-to-basics approach, writing: "Remember Who You Are is the sound of a band not so much rediscovering their past as recycling it."

== Track listing ==
All tracks are written by Korn

Standard album
No.	Title	Length
1.	"Uber-time"	1:29
2.	"Oildale (Leave Me Alone)"	4:43
3.	"Pop a Pill"	4:00
4.	"Fear Is a Place to Live"	3:09
5.	"Move On"	3:48
6.	"Lead the Parade"	4:25
7.	"Let the Guilt Go"	3:56
8.	"The Past"	5:06
9.	"Never Around"	5:30
10.	"Are You Ready to Live?"	3:59
11.	"Holding All These Lies"	4:38
Total length:		44:37

Japanese edition bonus track
No.	Title	Length
12.	"Freak on a Leash" (Live)	5:41
Total length:		50:18

Special edition / iTunes special edition bonus tracks
No.	Title	Length
12.	"Trapped Underneath the Stairs"	4:20
13.	"People Pleaser"	7:05
14.	"Blind" (Live)	5:28
15.	"Oildale (Leave Me Alone)" (Live, iTunes exclusive)	4:32
Total length:		70:34

- Special edition bonus DVD includes studio footage from the first 11 tracks. The footage was shot by Sébastian Paquet, who was also responsible for the concept, creation, photography, and authoring of the bonus DVD included with the special edition of Korn's untitled eighth album.

== Personnel ==
Korn

- Jonathan Davis – vocals, bagpipes
- James "Munky" Shaffer – guitar, lap steel, backing vocals
- Reginald “Fieldy” Arvizu – bass
- Ray Luzier – drums

Production and other credits

- Ross Robinson – production, additional music
- Jim Monti – engineering and mixing
- Ted Jensen – mastering
- Joseph Cultice – photography
- Matthew Goldman – art direction and design
- Recorded and mixed at Korn Studios, Hollywood, CA
- Mastered at Sterling Sound, New York City

DVD content (special edition only)

- Sébastien Paquet – DVD content direction, filming and editing
- Tom Hutton – DVD coordinator
- Sean Donnelly – DVD design
- Carol Ann Macahilig – DVD authoring

== Charts and sales ==
Korn III: Remember Who You Are sold 63,000 copies during its first week in the US, landing at number two on the Billboard 200.

Chart (2010)	Peak position
Australian Albums (ARIA)	8
Austrian Albums (Ö3 Austria Top 40)	3
Belgium (Ultratop Flanders)	27
Belgium (Ultratop Wallonia)	18
Canadian Albums (Nielsen SoundScan)	4
Czech Albums (ČNS IFPI)	20
Danish Albums (Tracklisten)	37
European Albums (Billboard)	4
Finnish Albums (Suomen virallinen lista)	14
Germany Albums (Media Control AG)	4
Greece Albums (IFPI)	17
Hungary Albums (MAHASZ)	38
Irish Albums (IRMA)	40
Italian Albums (FIMI)	19
Japanese Albums (Oricon)	28
Netherlands (MegaCharts)	20
New Zealand Albums (RIANZ)	5
Norwegian Albums (VG-lista)	34
Polish Albums Chart	30
Scottish Albums (Official Charts)	33
South Korean Albums (Circle)	38
Spanish Albums (PROMUSICAE)	56
Swedish Albums (Sverigetopplistan)	23
Swedish Hard Rock Albums (Sverigetopplistan)	1
Swiss Albums (Schweizer Hitparade)	8
UK Albums (The Official Charts Company)	23
UK Rock & Metal Albums (Official Charts)	1
US Billboard 200	2
US Rock Albums (Billboard)	1
US Alternative Albums (Billboard)	1
US Hard Rock Albums (Billboard)	1

== See also ==
- Mayhem Festival 2010
