= Chaos Lives in Everything =

2011 song by Korn

Single by Korn featuring Skrillex

from the album The Path of Totality
- Released: March 22, 2012
- Recorded: 2011
- Genre: Nu metal; dubstep
- Length: 3:47 (album); 3:22 (radio edit)
- Label: Roadrunner
- Songwriters: Jonathan Davis; James Shaffer; Reginald Arvizu; Ray Luzier
- Producer: Skrillex

Korn featuring Skrillex singles chronology
"Way Too Far" (2012)	"Chaos Lives in Everything" (2012)	"Never Never" (2013)

Skrillex singles chronology
"Bangarang" (2012)	"Chaos Lives in Everything" (2012)	"Make It Bun Dem" (2012)

Music video
- "Chaos Lives in Everything" on YouTube

"Chaos Lives in Everything" is a song by American nu metal band Korn and dubstep artist Skrillex, released as the final single from their tenth studio album The Path of Totality.

== Background ==
Two music videos were released for the song, the first released alongside the single on March 23. The band is absent for the entire video. It instead centers around a group of skaters, after one of them collided with a businessman resulting in his coffee being spilled. After an encounter with the rest of the group, a fight scene ensues, concluding with the businessman destroying his phone.

The "official" video was released on April 5, featuring live footage from the band's performances during The Path of Totality Tour. This video was announced and released due to negative feedback from fans on the former video.

== Themes and composition ==
The track initiates with a quick hi hat groove, which proceeds to give way to an intense electronic drop. The chorus is considerably more guitar-focused than dubstep traditionally is.

As the title implies, the song lyrically revolves around the prevalence and perceived universality of chaos and interpersonal conflict: "It's just me noticing at the time that chaos does live in everything. There's drama everywhere."

== Promotion ==
A viral video was created and uploaded to YouTube by Roadrunner Records UK, presented as a jocular news broadcast about an alleged pandemic in which the letter "R" was seen to be reversing for an unknown reason. Entitled "Global Chaos as Letters Reverse", the video was released with the intent to promote the song.

== Reception ==
The song was described in a Spin album review as "grind[ing] with convincing menace". As the album's opener, it has been cited as "a nice statement of intent".

An album review from AVClub was comparatively less favorable, labelling it and Narcissistic Cannibal as "a choppy, crisped-beyond-recognition version of Korn's former gloom".

== Personnel ==
- Jonathan Davis – lead vocals
- James "Munky" Shaffer – guitars
- Reginald "Fieldy" Arvizu – bass
- Ray Luzier – drums
- Sonny Moore - production
