= Round Mountain Oil Field =

Oil and gas field near Bakersfield, California, United States

Coordinates: 35.4904°N 118.8940°W

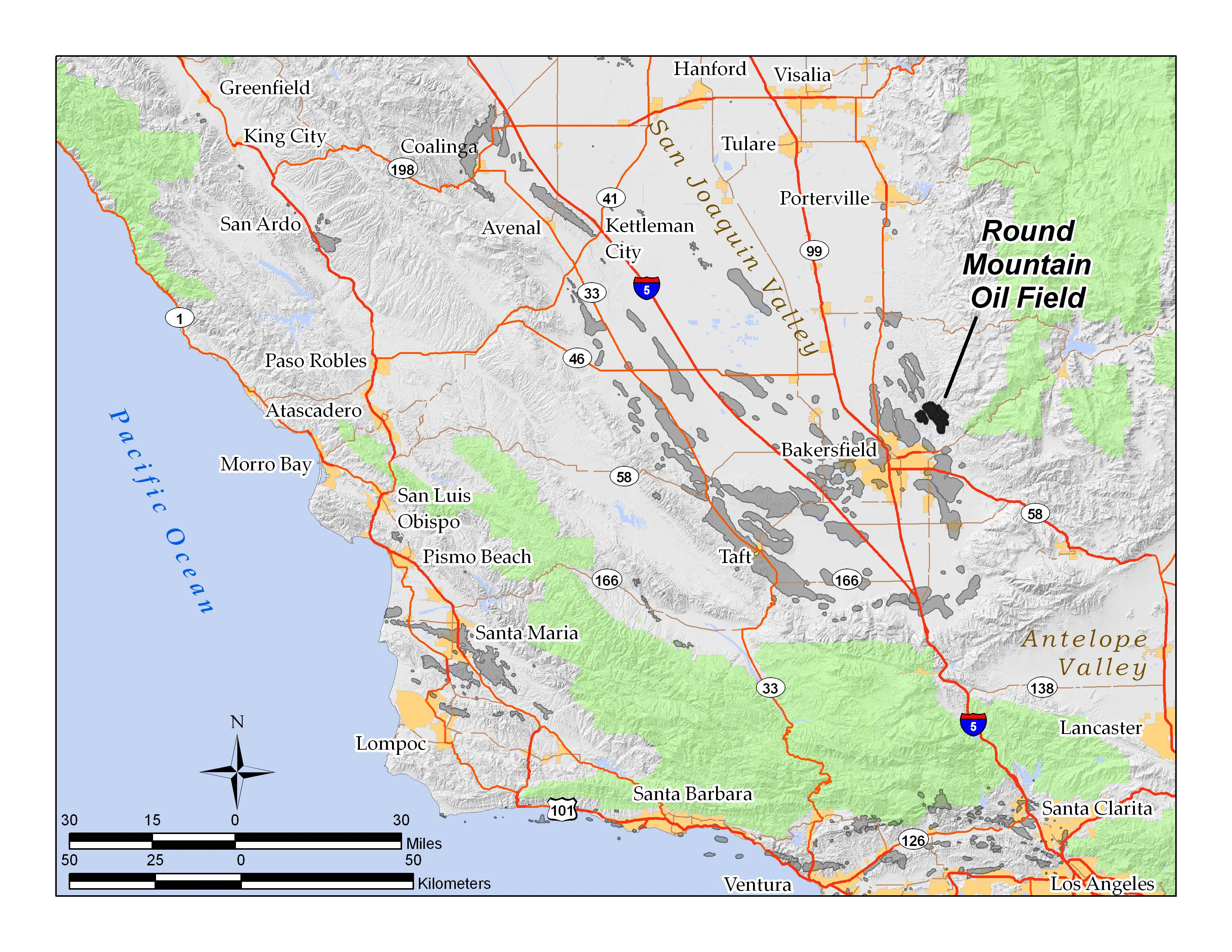
The Round Mountain Oil Field in Kern County, California. Other oil fields are shown in gray.

The Round Mountain Oil Field is a large oil and gas field in the foothills of the Sierra Nevada, about 10 miles (16 km) northeast of Bakersfield, California, United States. It is east of the giant Kern River Oil Field, one of the largest in the United States, and also close to the Mount Poso Oil Field and Kern Front Oil Field. With a cumulative total recovery of more than 110 million barrels (17,000,000 m^{3}) of oil, it is the 48th largest oil field in California, but remains relatively productive with still about ten percent of its reserves remaining in the ground, according to the California Department of Oil, Gas, and Geothermal Resources (DOGGR).

== Setting ==
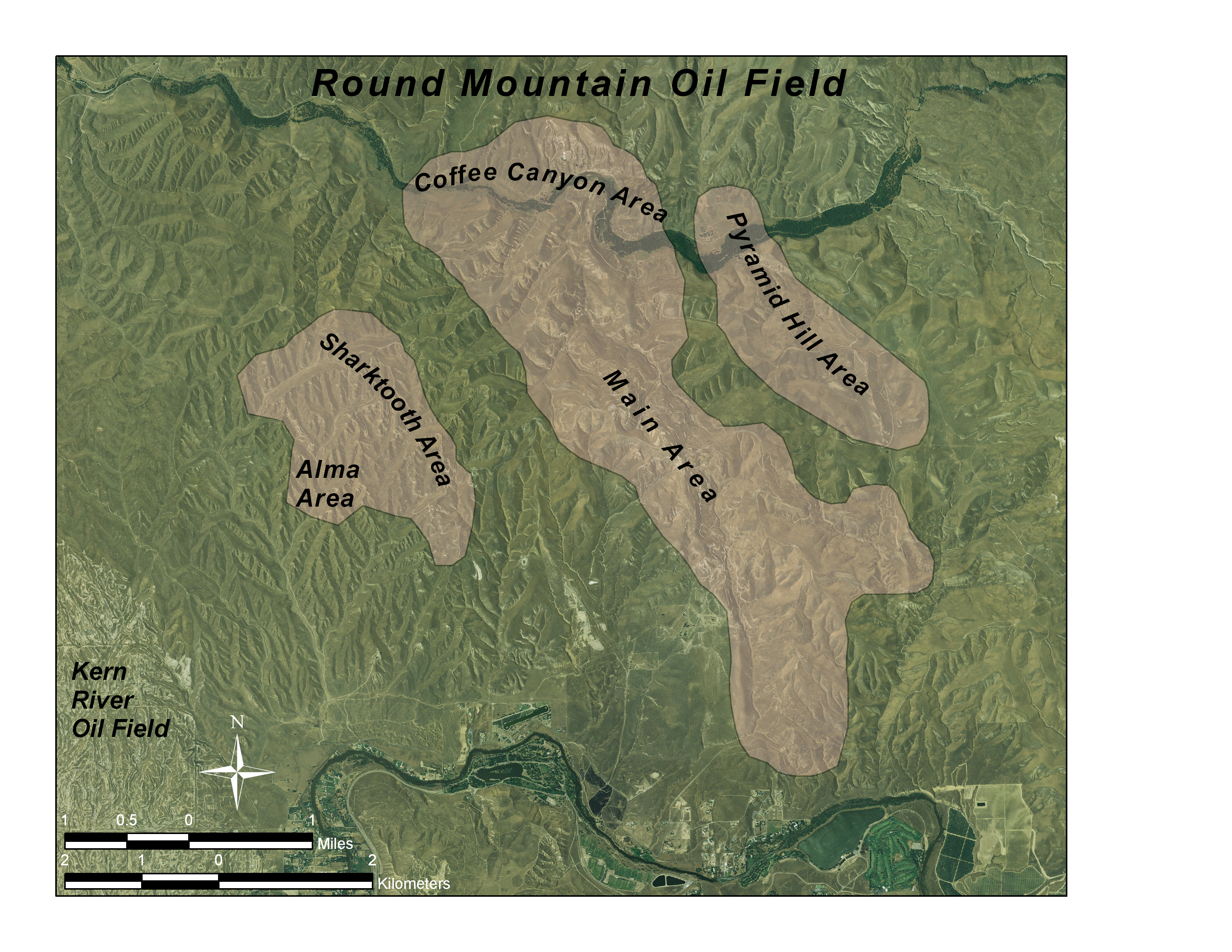
Round Mountain Oil Field, on a 2005 aerial photograph base. The light-shaded area is the rough extent of the productive area of the oil field.

The oil field is northeast of the city of Bakersfield, between the Kern River and Poso Creek, in the lower foothills of the Sierra Nevada. The main access to the field is from the south, by way of Round Mountain Road, which also passes through the huge and much more densely developed Kern River Oil Field. Elevations on the Round Mountain Field range from around 700 feet (210 m) at Poso Creek to 1,612 feet (491 m) at Round Mountain itself. Topographic relief is high in some parts of the field, especially the northern part of the Main Area, which is intersected by numerous deep canyons.

Being mostly within the ecological subsection of the California Central Valley known as the Hardpan Terraces, the predominant native vegetation is needlegrass, with some scrub occurring, especially on north-facing slopes. The climate is hot and arid, with summertime temperatures routinely exceeding 100 °F (38 °C); the mean freeze-free period runs from about 250 to 300 days. Mean annual precipitation is around 10 inches (250 mm), almost all as rain and almost all in the winter; summers are generally rainless. Runoff is quick, and streams are dry in the summer and early autumn; water from the area flows out by Poso Creek and the Kern River to closed basins in the southern San Joaquin Valley, including Buena Vista Lake.

The field itself is spread out into five named areas, several of which consist of multiple discontiguous productive regions. The Main Area is the largest, consisting of one pool about 5 miles (8.0 km) long by 0.5 miles (0.80 km) across, extending north to south from Poso Creek to Kern River, and including Round Mountain. North of the main area is the Coffee Canyon Area, and northeast is the Pyramid Area. To the west of the Main Area are the two separate pools in the Sharktooth Area, and the two pools in the Alma Area. The total productive area of the entire field is 2,630 acres (10.6 km^{2}), or approximately four square miles.

== Geology ==
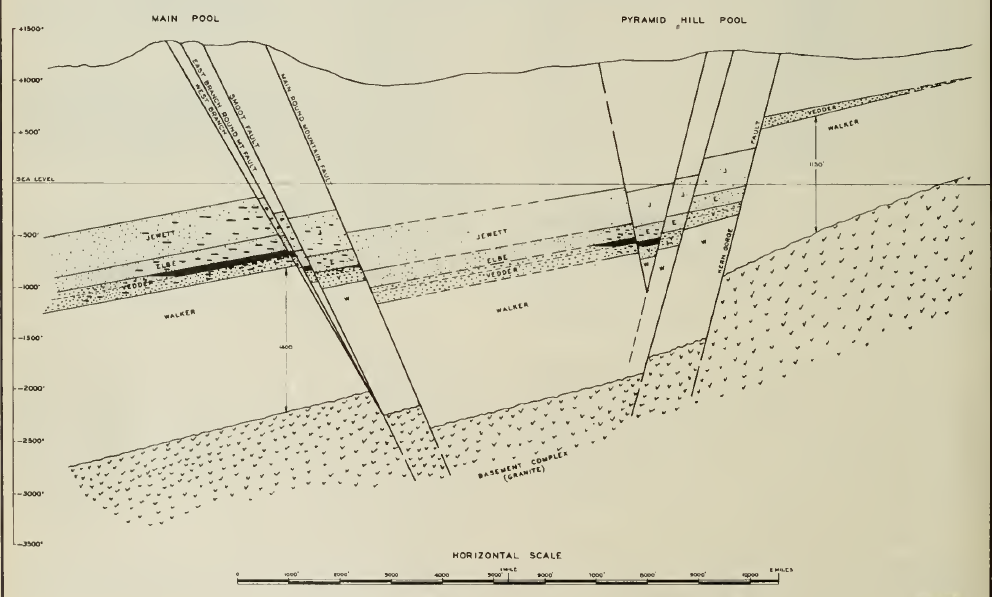
Round Mountain Oil Field Geologic Cross Section

Oil in the Round Mountain Field comes from four primary pools, the Freeman-Jewett, Pyramid Hill, Vedder, and Walker. Each resides in a sedimentary formation equivalently named, and are listed from top to bottom in stratigraphic sequence. The Freeman-Jewett and Pyramid Hill are of Miocene Age; the Vedder of Oligocene; and the lowest-lying productive unit, the Walker Formation, was deposited during the Eocene and Oligocene. Of these units, the Vedder has been by far the most productive, with over 50 million barrels (7,900,000 m^{3}) of oil being extracted.

The field is bounded on the northeast by a fault which serves as a structural trap since it is upgradient from the oil pools. Basement rocks underneath the productive units are of Jurassic age, and at around 4,000 feet (1,200 m) are not particularly deep for a Kern County oil field. The deepest well on the field is the Killingsworth "Alma" No. 6, at 4,418 feet (1,347 m), which reached the granitic basement.

Oil from the field is generally heavy, with API gravity ranging from 13 at the Sharktooth and Alma areas to 22 in the Jewett pool in the Main Area. Waterflooding and cyclic steam processes have been used to retrieve some of the heavier petroleum since the early 1960s.

== History, production, and operations ==
The discovery well was drilled by Getty Oil, now part of Chevron Corp., in May 1927, in the Pyramid Hill pool of the Main Area. Dates of discovery of other parts of the field were 1928 for the Coffee Canyon Area, 1937 for the Pyramid Area, 1943 for the Sharktooth Area, and most recently 1974 for the Alma Area. The peak production for the field as a whole was 1938, during which 5,453,194 barrels (866,988.6 m^{3}) barrels of oil were pumped out.

As of 2008, Chevron retained no operating units in the field, and the current operators included Macpherson Oil Co., Coffee Petroleum, Pace Diversified Corp., and Arthur McAdams. None of the major oil companies had operations at Round Mountain.
