= Let the Guilt Go =

Single by Korn

from the album Korn III: Remember Who You Are
- Released: July 26, 2010
- Genre: Nu metal
- Length: 3:57 (album version); 3:03 (radio edit)
- Label: Roadrunner
- Songwriters: Reginald Arvizu, Jonathan Davis, Ray Luzier, Ross Robinson, James Shaffer
- Producer: Ross Robinson

Korn singles chronology
"Oildale (Leave Me Alone)" (2010)	"Let the Guilt Go" (2010)	"Get Up!" (2011)

Music video
- "Let the Guilt Go" on YouTube

"Let the Guilt Go" is a song written and recorded by American nu metal band Korn, and the second single for their ninth studio album, Korn III: Remember Who You Are. It was released on July 26, 2010. Korn performed "Let the Guilt Go" on Lopez Tonight.

== Music video ==
The music video for "Let the Guilt Go", directed by Nathan Cox, was premiered on September 2, 2010. The video begins with a view from inside a helicopter, flying over the crop fields of Bakersfield, with a number of crop circles visible below. It then cuts between footage of the band performing in said field, and a group of students who are studying, being approached and taunted by a couple of college football bullies before being left alone. That night, the three students are driving by one of the crop fields when they spot a bright light coming from the sky; one of the passengers, a girl (Amber Marie Bollinger), leaves the vehicle and enters the bright light. She is momentarily picked up off the ground by the light before being dropped back to Earth moments later.

The next day, the girl arrives at school dressed much more provocatively, which attracts the attention of the bullies from the day before. In class, the girl attracts the attention of one of the bullies, who fails to notice her testing newly acquired telekinesis on a pencil, which she then launches into a picture of the very same bully. A following night, the two travel to a "make out spot", where the bully tries to force himself upon the girl. A bright flash of light explodes from within the car, and the video cuts to the girl throwing her head back, the boy having exploded into white smoke. The girl leaves the car, and walks off.

The video then cuts to a final shot of the cropfield in night time, where there is a large crop circle with the words "KoЯn III" present in the middle.

== Charts ==
Chart (2010)	Peak position
Czech Republic Rock (IFPI)	4
US Mainstream Rock (Billboard)	23

== Awards ==
The song was nominated for Best Metal Performance at the Grammy Awards, which were held on February 13, 2011, but lost to Iron Maiden's "El Dorado".

== Personnel ==
- Jonathan Davis - vocals
- James Shaffer - guitars
- Reginald Arvizu - bass
- Ray Luzier - drums
- Ross Robinson - production
