= Way Too Far =

Single by Korn featuring 12th Planet and Flinch

from the album The Path of Totality
- Released: March 6, 2012
- Recorded: 2011
- Genre: Nu metal; dubstep; industrial metal
- Length: 3:49
- Label: Roadrunner
- Songwriters: Dadzie Annan, Reginald Arvizu, Jonathan Davis, Adam Glassco, Ray Luzier, James Shaffer, Luke W Walker
- Producers: 12th Planet, Flinch, Downlink, Jim Monti (add.)

Korn singles chronology
"Narcissistic Cannibal" (2011)	"Way Too Far" (2012)	"Chaos Lives in Everything" (2012)

Music video
- "Way Too Far" on YouTube

"Way Too Far" is a song written and recorded by American nu metal band Korn. It was released as the third single from Korn's tenth studio album, The Path of Totality, on March 6, 2012. The single features production and additional music by 12th Planet, Flinch, and Downlink. It was also the last Korn single recorded as a quartet before original guitarist Brian Welch returned to the band the following year.

== Background and composition ==
Jonathan Davis explained the song's meaning:

It's about human beings and myself... it's about myself; sometimes I do take things way too far, something so stupid I shouldn't waste my energy on – I'll freak out and make it into something humongous when it should be nothing. I think a lot of people can relate to that.

== Release ==
"Way Too Far" was released to active rock and heritage rock radio stations without an official impact date sometime in March 2012. It debuted and peaked at number 38 on the United States Billboard Mainstream Rock chart, failing to match the success of the album's first two singles. The song was inducted into the Loudwire Cage Match Hall of Fame after Internet users voted for it over various other songs five days in a row, beating songs by Slash, Demon Hunter, Pennywise, Metallica, and Hollywood Undead.

== Music video ==
The music video for "Way Too Far" premiered on May 7, 2012, and was directed by Joshua Allen, who also directed the previous music video for "Chaos Lives in Everything". Unlike the previous videos, this video was conceptual and its concept features each band member taking things 'way too far'. Jonathan Davis's alter-ego, JDevil, makes an appearance in the video.

== Formats and track listings ==
- CD single (United States)
1. "Way Too Far" (radio edit) – 3:23

== Charts ==
Chart (2012)	Peak position
US Mainstream Rock (Billboard)	38
