= Mount Poso Oil Field =

Field by the Sierra Nevada in California, US

Coordinates: 35.5972°N 118.9632°W

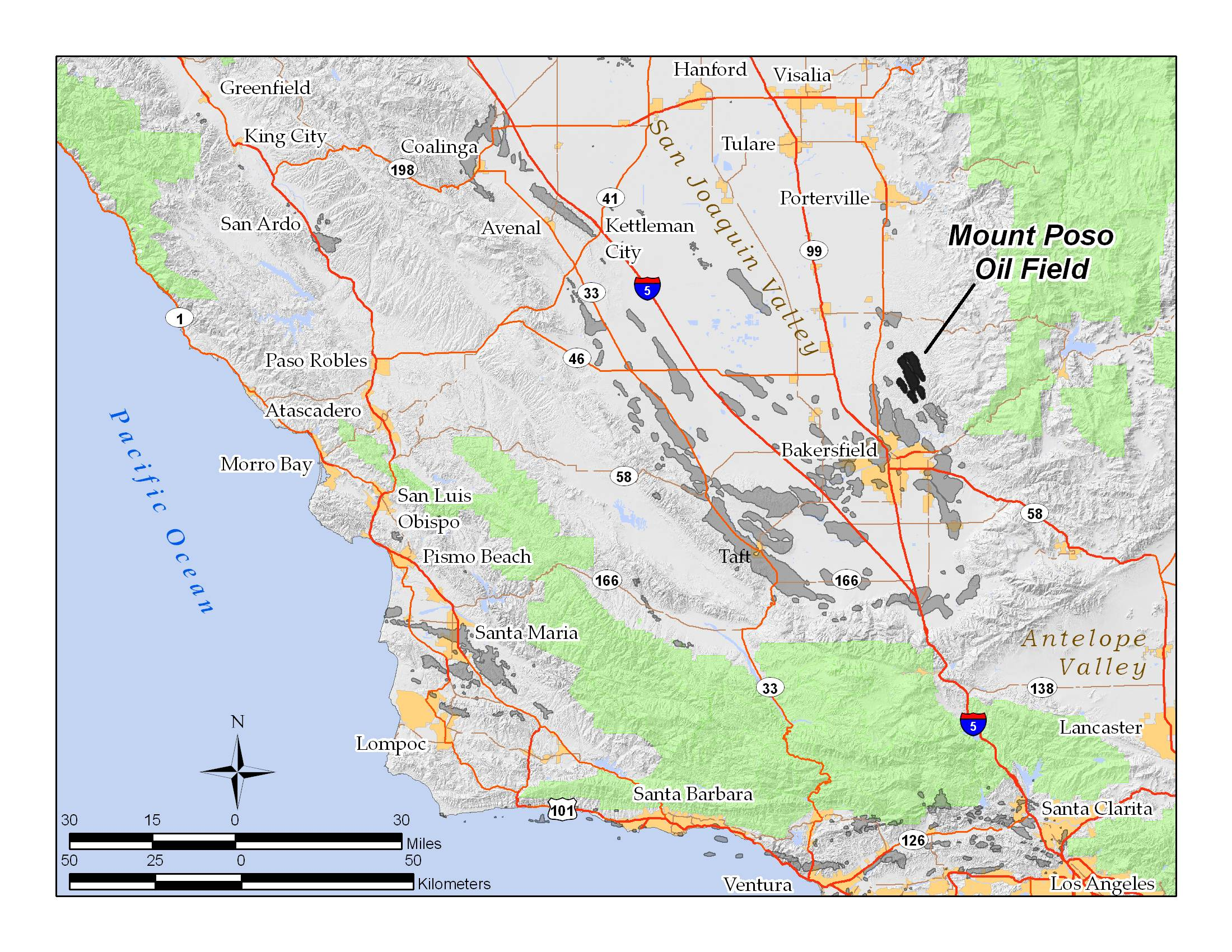
The Mount Poso Oil Field in Kern County, California. Other oil fields are shown in gray.

The Mount Poso Oil Field is a large oil and gas field in the lower foothills of the Sierra Nevada in Kern County, California, United States. Discovered in 1926, it is the 21st largest field in California by total ultimate oil recovery, having a cumulative production of close to 300 million barrels (48,000,000 m^{3}). The current principal operator of the field is California Resources Corporation; 652 wells remained active at the end of 2006, while production had dwindled to 554,000 barrels (88,100 m^{3}) during that year, from a peak of over 9 million barrels (1,400,000 m^{3}) in 1981.

== Setting ==
The oil field is in the lower Sierra Foothills, north and northeast of the city of Bakersfield, and directly north of the giant Kern River Oil Field. To the west is the large agricultural region of the San Joaquin Valley. Vegetation on the hills around the oil field is mostly grassland. The field is about 9 miles (14 km) long and 4 to 5 miles (6 to 8 km) across, although some of the productive areas are widely separated, and even within the four named areas the pools are often discontiguous. Elevations on the field range from around 650 feet (200 m) at the southern boundary along Poso Creek to over 1,400 feet (430 m) in the northeastern portion; the central area of operations, around Halfway House, is approximately 1,100 feet (340 m) above sea level.

Access to the field is by several roads. Famoso Woody Road enters the field from the west, from its junction with California State Route 65 in the San Joaquin Valley bottom, and Granite Road crosses the field from south to north, also passing through the Kern Front field.

Other oil fields nearby, in addition the Kern River field, are the Poso Creek Oil Field to the southwest, adjacent to the San Joaquin Valley bottomland, and the Kern Front Oil Field, which is between the Poso Creek field and the Kern River field; all three of these nearby fields are in the lowest portion of the foothills as they begin to rise from the valley floor. To the southeast of Mount Poso is the Round Mountain Oil Field.

The climate is semi-arid, with long, hot summers and cool winters. Most precipitation falls in the winter, in the form of rain, with the amount increasing with elevation. Summertime temperatures regularly exceed 100 °F (38 °C).

== Geology ==
The Mount Poso Oil Field is a complex agglomeration of petroleum pools in structural and stratigraphic traps, and divided into six general areas, all of which are cut by faults, and many of which are discontiguous even within named areas. From north to south, the areas are: Dominion, the second-largest, at 790 acres (3.2 km^{2}); Granite Canyon (130 acres (0.53 km^{2})); the Main Area, the largest, at 2,335 acres (9.45 km^{2}); West (210 acres (0.85 km^{2})); Dorsey Area (410 acres (1.7 km^{2})); and the Baker-Grover Area (115 acres (0.47 km^{2})). All six areas include wells in the Vedder Formation, of Oligocene age, while the Dominion and Main Areas also include wells in the more recently discovered Freeman-Jewett Formation, of Miocene age. Source rocks are well-sorted medium grain marine sandstones of high porosity (around 35%).

The oil field is shallow, compared to other Central Valley fields, as the basement rocks are only about 3,000 feet (910 m) below ground surface. The deepest well only goes to 3,759 feet (1,146 m), reaching the Freeman Formation, of Eocene age. Underneath the oil-bearing sedimentary formations, the basement granitic complex is of Jurassic age. It rises towards the east, part of the enormous Sierra Nevada Batholith.

Oil from the field is heavy crude, and consistent between the different areas, ranging from API gravity of 13 to 16. Sulfur content is also consistent at approximately 0.65 percent by weight throughout the different pools.

== History, production, and operations ==
The Mount Poso Oil Field was discovered in 1926, during an era in which many of the large California oil fields were found, especially those adjacent to the previous large discoveries which had taken place in the preceding three decades.

Shell Oil acquired the field in the 1960s, intending to subject the entire area to steam flooding, a technology which was then new, and producing impressive yields elsewhere in heavy oil fields in California, such as the Midway-Sunset and Kern River fields. In 1969, production from the field was a mere 1,560 barrels (248 m^{3}) of oil per day; however, by the 1980s, Shell had increased production to 25,000 barrels (4,000 m^{3}) of oil per day, attaining a total of over 9 million bbl (1.4 million m^{3}) in 1981, the highest yield ever achieved from the field, and making the field the 8th-most productive in the state. In 1999, as the field appeared to be played out, they sold it to Nuevo Energy, the predecessor of Plains Exploration & Production (PXP). This firm ran the field until they sold their portion of it to Vintage Production LLC, a subsidiary of Occidental Petroleum, in 2006. As of 2009, Vintage was the largest operator on the field, with numerous smaller operators still active.
