= Oildale, California =

Oildale
- Census-designated place
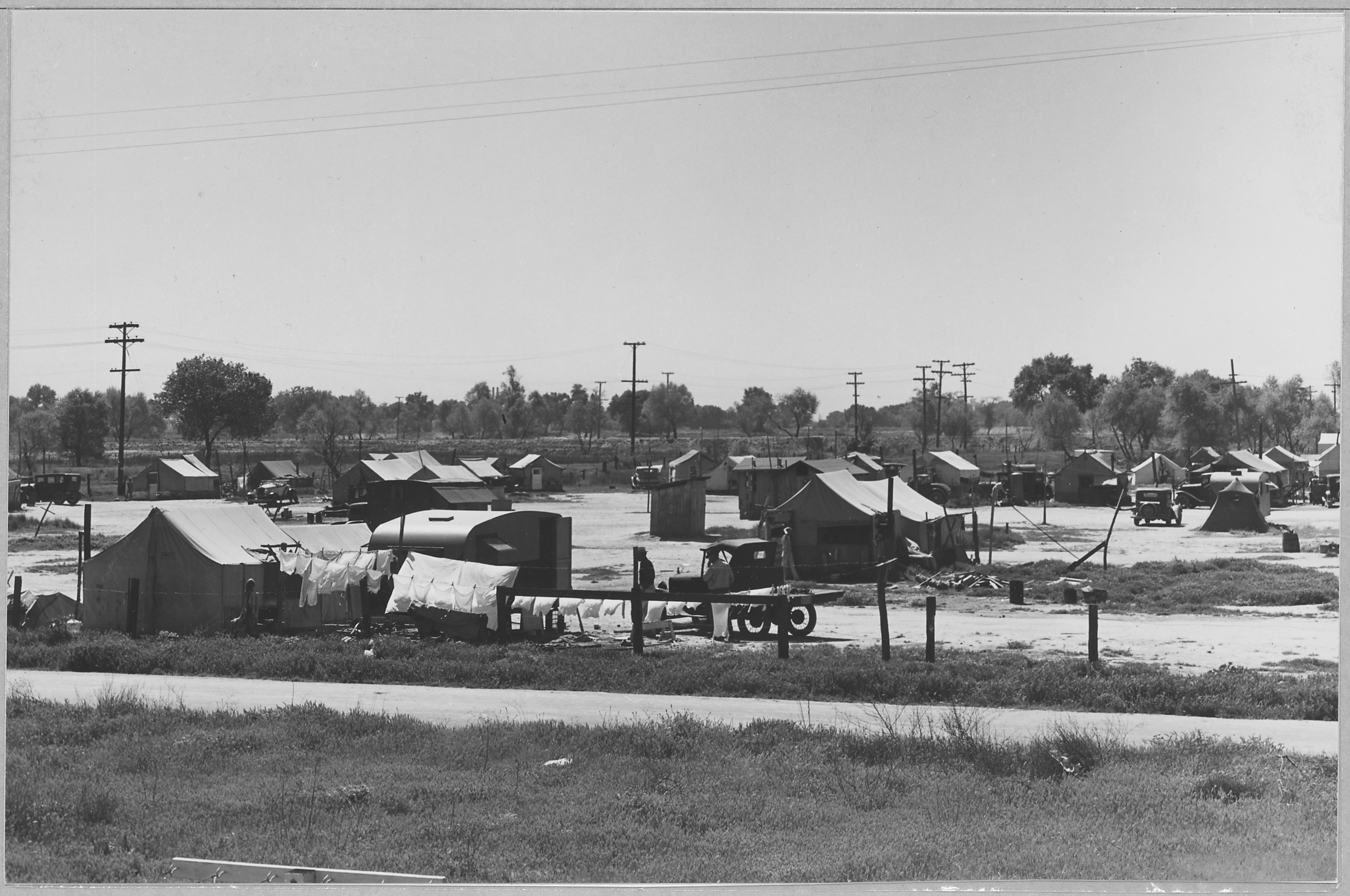
- Oildale Tent Village
- Interactive map of Oildale
- Location in California Oildale (the United States)
- Coordinates: 35°25′11″N 119°01′10″W
- Country: United States
- State: California
- County: Kern

Government
  - Senate: Shannon Grove (R)
  - Assembly: Stan Ellis (R)
  - U. S. Congress: Vince Fong (R); David Valadao (R)

Area
  - Total: 7.909 sq mi (20.485 km^{2})
  - Land: 7.909 sq mi (20.485 km^{2})
  - Water: 0 sq mi (0 km^{2}) 0%
- Elevation: 469 ft (143 m)

Population (2020)
  - Total: 36,135
  - Density: 4,568.7/sq mi (1,764.0/km^{2})
- Time zone: UTC-8 (PST)
  - Summer (DST): UTC-7 (PDT)
- ZIP code: 93308
- Area code: 661
- FIPS code: 06-53448
- GNIS feature ID: 1652762

Oildale is a census-designated place (CDP) in Kern County, California, United States. Oildale is located 3.5 miles (5.6 km) north-northwest of downtown Bakersfield, at an elevation of 469 feet (143 m). The population was 32,684 at the 2010 census, up from 27,885 at the 2000 census. In the 2020 census, Oildale's population was 35,520. It is an unincorporated suburban town just north of Bakersfield across the Kern River, west of the Kern River Oil Field, and east of Highway 99.

== History ==
Previously called Waits and North Side, Oildale was founded in 1909 when Samuel Dickinson subdivided his land. The first post office opened at Oildale in 1916. Most of the original U-2 spy planes flown out of Groom Lake were built at a secret factory in Oildale disguised as a tire factory, just west of Meadows Field Airport on Norris Road.

== Geography ==
According to the United States Census Bureau, the CDP had a total area of 7.909 square miles (20.484 km^{2}), all land.

At the 2010 census, the CDP has a total area of 6.533 square miles (16.920 km^{2}), all land.

Oildale is adjacent to three large oil fields, including two of the largest in California. The enormous Kern River Oil Field to the east and northeast has more active oil wells (9,183 at the end of 2006) than any other field in California except for the Midway-Sunset Oil Field in southwestern Kern County (which has 11,145). Also adjacent is the huge Kern Front Oil Field, north of town, and the smaller Fruitvale Oil Field, to the southwest.

== Demographics ==
Historical population
Census	Pop.	Note	%±
1970	20,879		—
1980	23,382		12.0%
1990	26,553		13.6%
2000	27,885		5.0%
2010	32,684		17.2%
2020	36,135		10.6%
U.S. Decennial Census; 1860–1870 1880-1890; 1900 1910 1920; 1930 1940 1950; 1960 1970 1980; 1990 2000 2010; 2020

Oildale first appeared as an unincorporated place in the 1970 U.S. census; and as a census designated place in the 1980 United States census.

=== Racial and ethnic composition ===
Oildale CDP, California – Racial and ethnic composition Note: the US Census treats Hispanic/Latino as an ethnic category. This table excludes Latinos from the racial categories and assigns them to a separate category. Hispanics/Latinos may be of any race.
Race / Ethnicity (NH = Non-Hispanic)	Pop 2000	Pop 2010	Pop 2020	% 2000	% 2010	% 2020
White alone (NH)	23,664	24,548	21,384	84.86%	75.11%	59.18%
Black or African American alone (NH)	83	217	868	0.30%	0.66%	2.40%
Native American or Alaska Native alone (NH)	525	433	408	1.88%	1.32%	1.13%
Asian alone (NH)	83	292	357	0.30%	0.89%	0.99%
Native Hawaiian or Pacific Islander alone (NH)	13	20	33	0.05%	0.06%	0.09%
Other race alone (NH)	21	37	147	0.08%	0.11%	0.41%
Mixed race or Multiracial (NH)	668	836	1,836	2.40%	2.56%	5.08%
Hispanic or Latino (any race)	2,828	6,301	11,102	10.14%	19.28%	30.72%
Total	27,885	32,684	36,135	100.00%	100.00%	100.00%

=== 2020 census ===
As of the 2020 census, Oildale had a population of 36,135. The population density was 4,568.8 inhabitants per square mile (1,764.0/km^{2}). The census reported that 99.5% of residents lived in households and 0.5% lived in non-institutionalized group quarters; no residents were institutionalized.

The age distribution was 28.1% under the age of 18, 8.8% aged 18 to 24, 28.8% aged 25 to 44, 22.6% aged 45 to 64, and 11.7% who were 65 years of age or older. The median age was 32.7 years. For every 100 females there were 95.3 males, and for every 100 females age 18 and over there were 92.0 males age 18 and over.

There were 13,025 households; 36.9% had children under the age of 18, 34.9% were married-couple households, 11.2% were cohabiting couple households, 32.2% had a female householder with no spouse or partner present, and 21.7% had a male householder with no spouse or partner present. About 25.9% of households were made up of individuals, and 10.0% had someone living alone who was 65 years of age or older. The average household size was 2.76. There were 8,504 families (65.3% of all households).

There were 13,769 housing units at an average density of 1,740.9 per square mile (672.2/km^{2}), of which 13,025 (94.6%) were occupied. Of the occupied units, 40.4% were owner-occupied and 59.6% were rented. The homeowner vacancy rate was 1.0% and the rental vacancy rate was 4.6%.

100.0% of residents lived in urban areas, while 0.0% lived in rural areas.

Racial composition as of the 2020 census
Race	Number	Percent
White	23,963	66.3%
Black or African American	950	2.6%
American Indian and Alaska Native	739	2.0%
Asian	455	1.3%
Native Hawaiian and Other Pacific Islander	48	0.1%
Some other race	5,295	14.7%
Two or more races	4,685	13.0%
Hispanic or Latino (of any race)	11,102	30.7%

=== 2023 American Community Survey ===
In 2023, the US Census Bureau estimated that 6.3% of the population were foreign-born. Of all people aged 5 or older, 80.9% spoke only English at home, 16.9% spoke Spanish, 0.9% spoke other Indo-European languages, 0.6% spoke Asian or Pacific Islander languages, and 0.6% spoke other languages. Of those aged 25 or older, 82.2% were high school graduates and 12.3% had a bachelor's degree.

The median household income in 2023 was $49,622, and the per capita income was $23,955. About 23.5% of families and 26.9% of the population were below the poverty line.

=== 2010 census ===
At the 2010 census Oildale had a population of 32,684. The population density was 5,003.2 inhabitants per square mile (1,931.7/km^{2}). The racial makeup of Oildale was 27,463 (84.0%) White, 255 (0.8%) African American, 590 (1.8%) Native American, 316 (1.0%) Asian, 30 (0.1%) Pacific Islander, 2,635 (8.1%) from other races, and 1,395 (4.3%) from two or more races. Hispanic or Latino of any race were 6,301 persons (19.3%).

The census reported that 32,636 people (99.9% of the population) lived in households, 48 (0.1%) lived in non-institutionalized group quarters, and no one was institutionalized.

There were 12,023 households, 4,775 (39.7%) had children under the age of 18 living in them, 4,476 (37.2%) were opposite-sex married couples living together, 2,372 (19.7%) had a female householder with no husband present, 1,078 (9.0%) had a male householder with no wife present. There were 1,322 (11.0%) unmarried opposite-sex partnerships, and 132 (1.1%) same-sex married couples or partnerships. 3,099 households (25.8%) were one person and 1,062 (8.8%) had someone living alone who was 65 or older. The average household size was 2.71. There were 7,926 families (65.9% of households); the average family size was 3.23.

The age distribution was 9,426 people (28.8%) under the age of 18, 3,627 people (11.1%) aged 18 to 24, 8,810 people (27.0%) aged 25 to 44, 7,561 people (23.1%) aged 45 to 64, and 3,260 people (10.0%) who were 65 or older. The median age was 31.4 years. For every 100 females, there were 94.9 males. For every 100 females age 18 and over, there were 91.9 males.

There were 13,555 housing units at an average density of 2,075.0 per square mile, of the occupied units 5,211 (43.3%) were owner-occupied and 6,812 (56.7%) were rented. The homeowner vacancy rate was 4.0%; the rental vacancy rate was 10.5%. 13,576 people (41.5% of the population) lived in owner-occupied housing units and 19,060 people (58.3%) lived in rental housing units.

== People from Oildale ==
- Vern Burke – Pro football player
- Merle Haggard – Country music artist
- Kevin Harvick – NASCAR driver
- Gerald Haslam – Author
- Amber L. Hollibaugh – Writer, filmmaker, activist and organizer
- Buck Owens – Country music artist
- Jonathan Davis – Lead singer of Korn
