= Kern River Oil Field =

Oil field in the San Joaquin Valley of California

Coordinates: 35.4564°N 118.9834°W

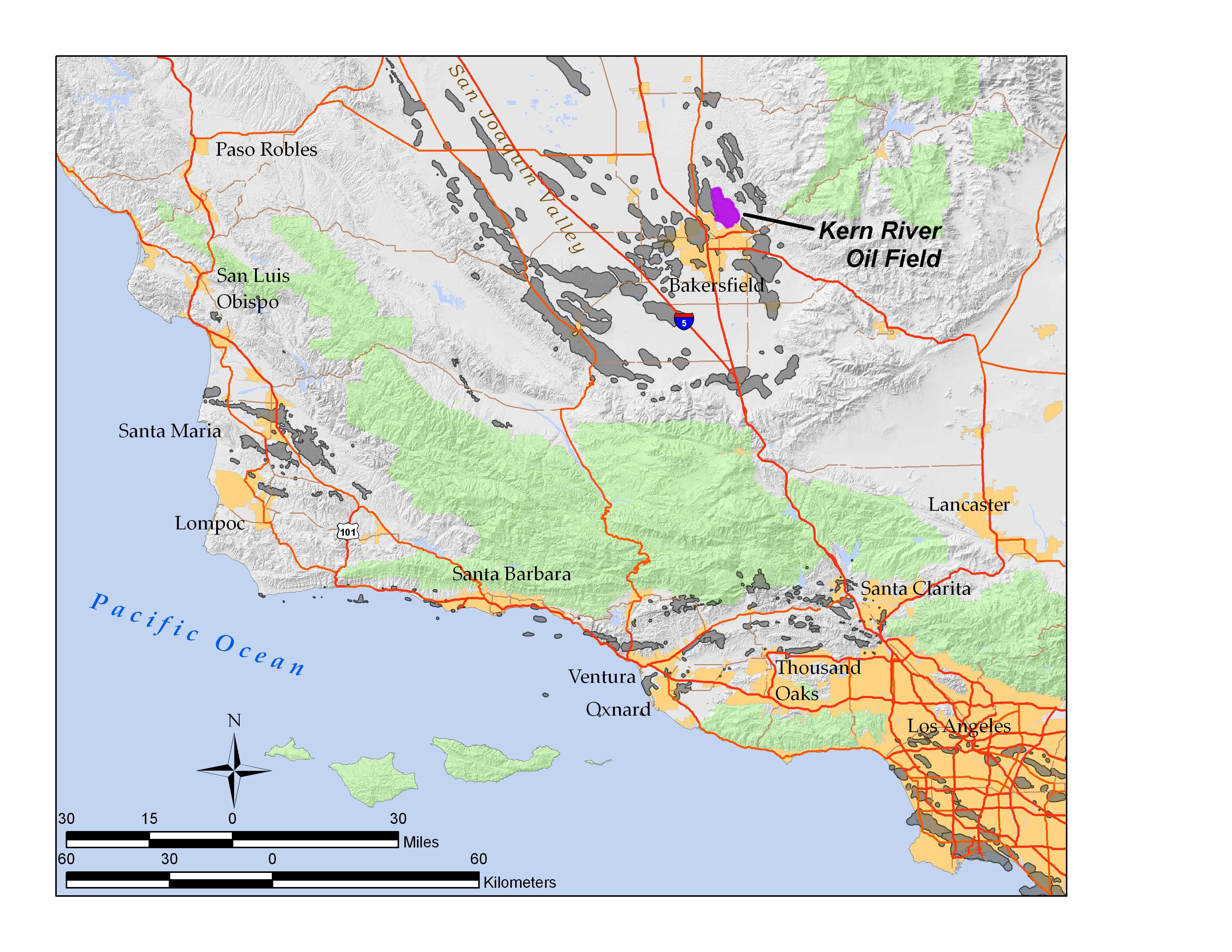
The Kern River Oil Field (purple) in south-central California. Other oil fields are shown in gray.

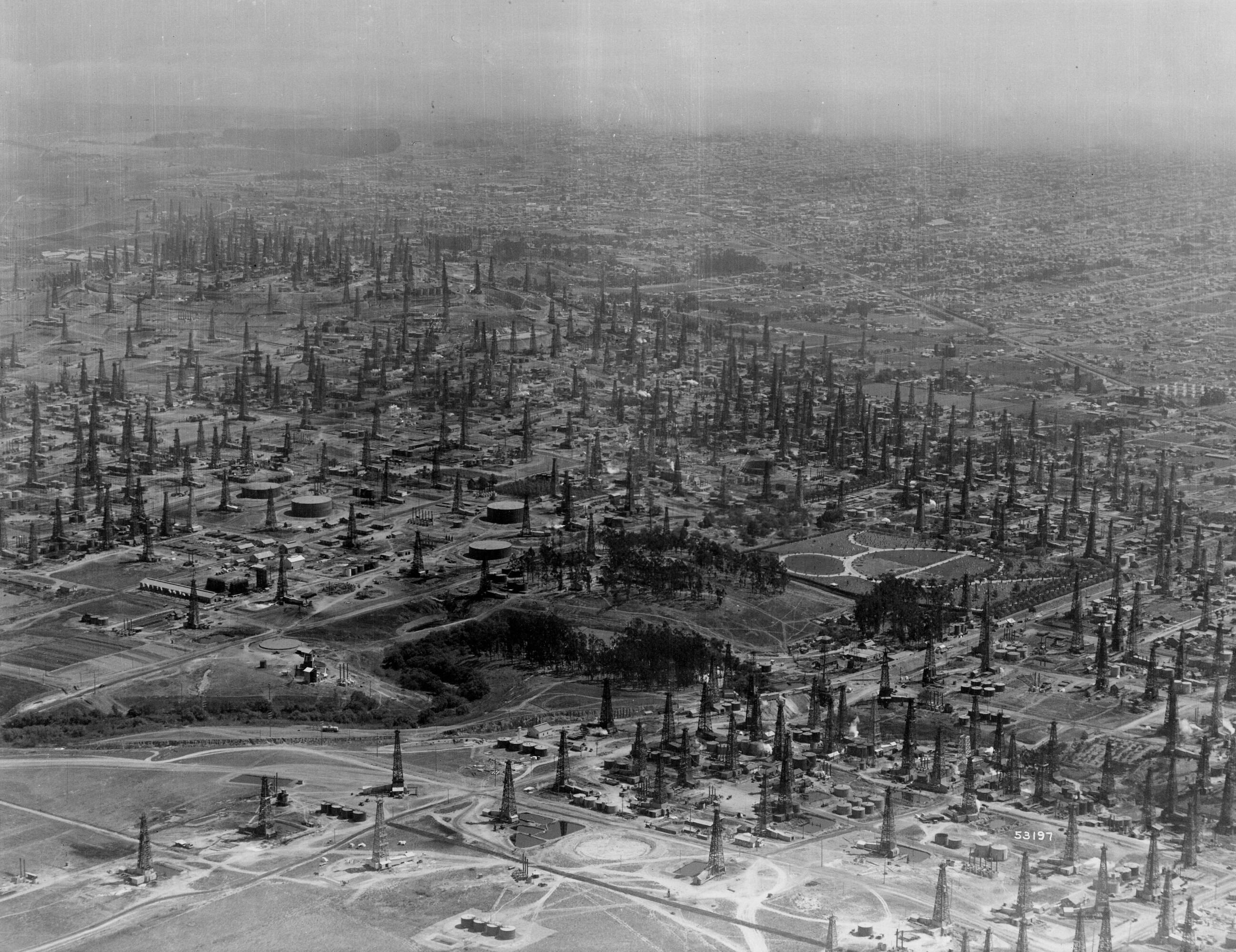
Kern River drilling rigs, 1923

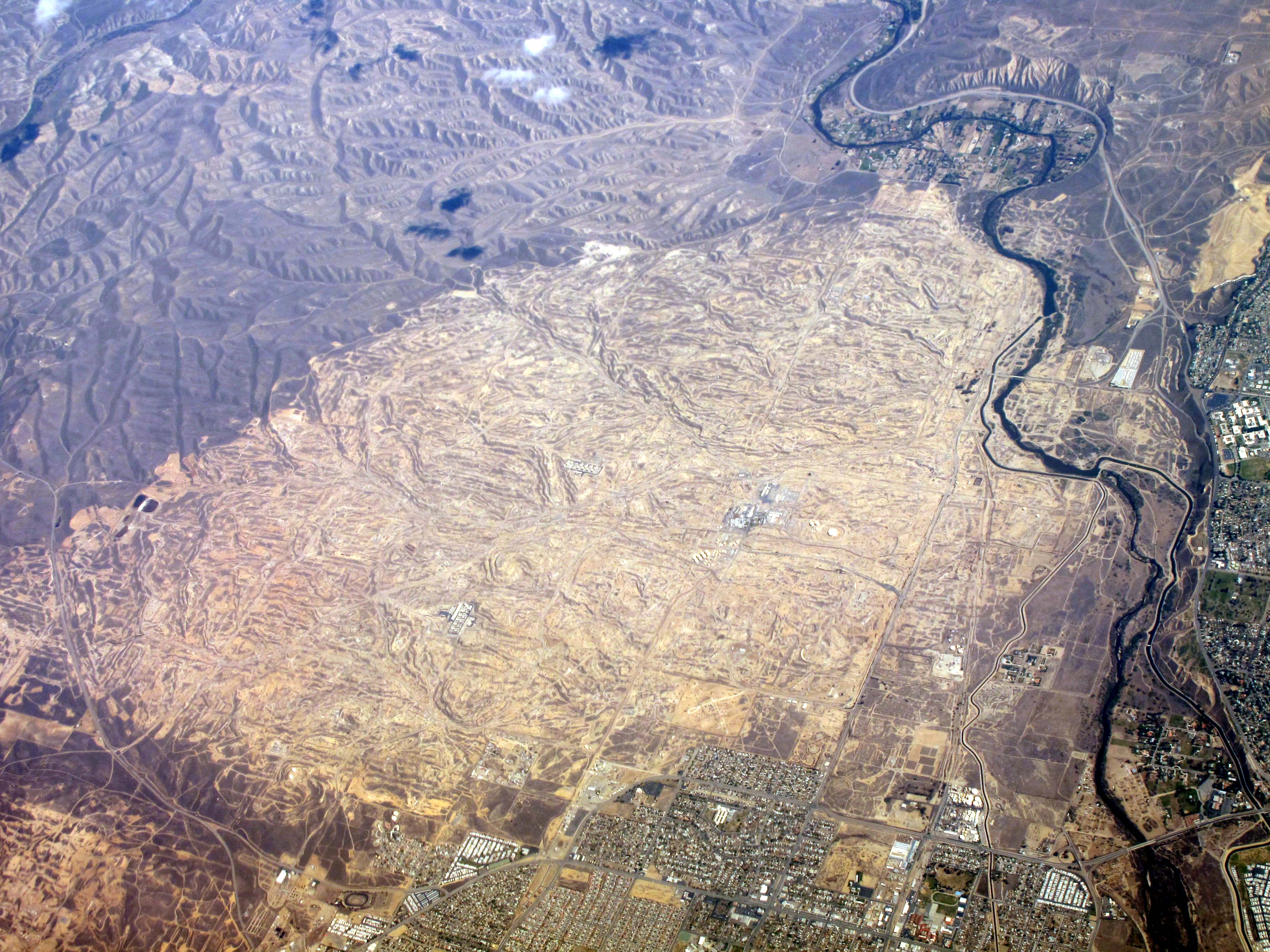
Kern River Oil Field aerial, 2012.

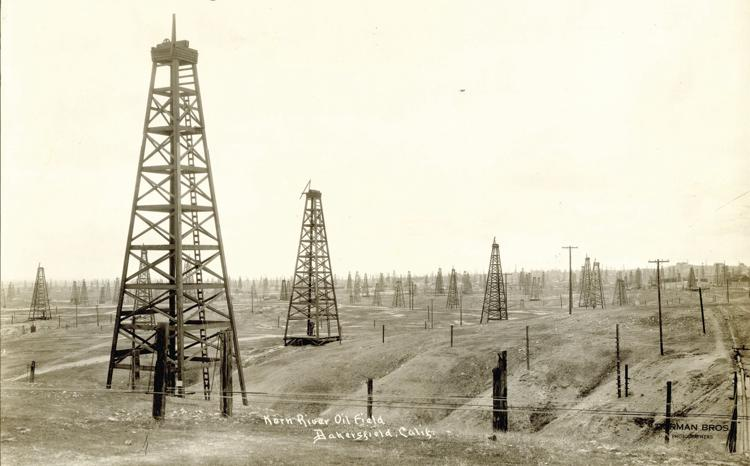
Kern River Oil Field in 1910

The Kern River Oil Field is a large oil field in Kern County in the San Joaquin Valley of California, north-northeast of Bakersfield in the lower Sierra foothills. Yielding a cumulative production of close to 2 billion barrels (320,000,000 m^{3}) of oil by the end of 2006, it is the third largest oil field in California, after the Midway-Sunset Oil Field and the Wilmington Oil Field, and the fifth largest in the United States. Its estimated remaining reserves, as of the end of 2006, were around 476 million barrels (75,700,000 m^{3}), the second largest in the state. It had 9,183 active wells, the second highest in the state. The principal operator on the field is Chevron Corporation

== Geographic setting ==
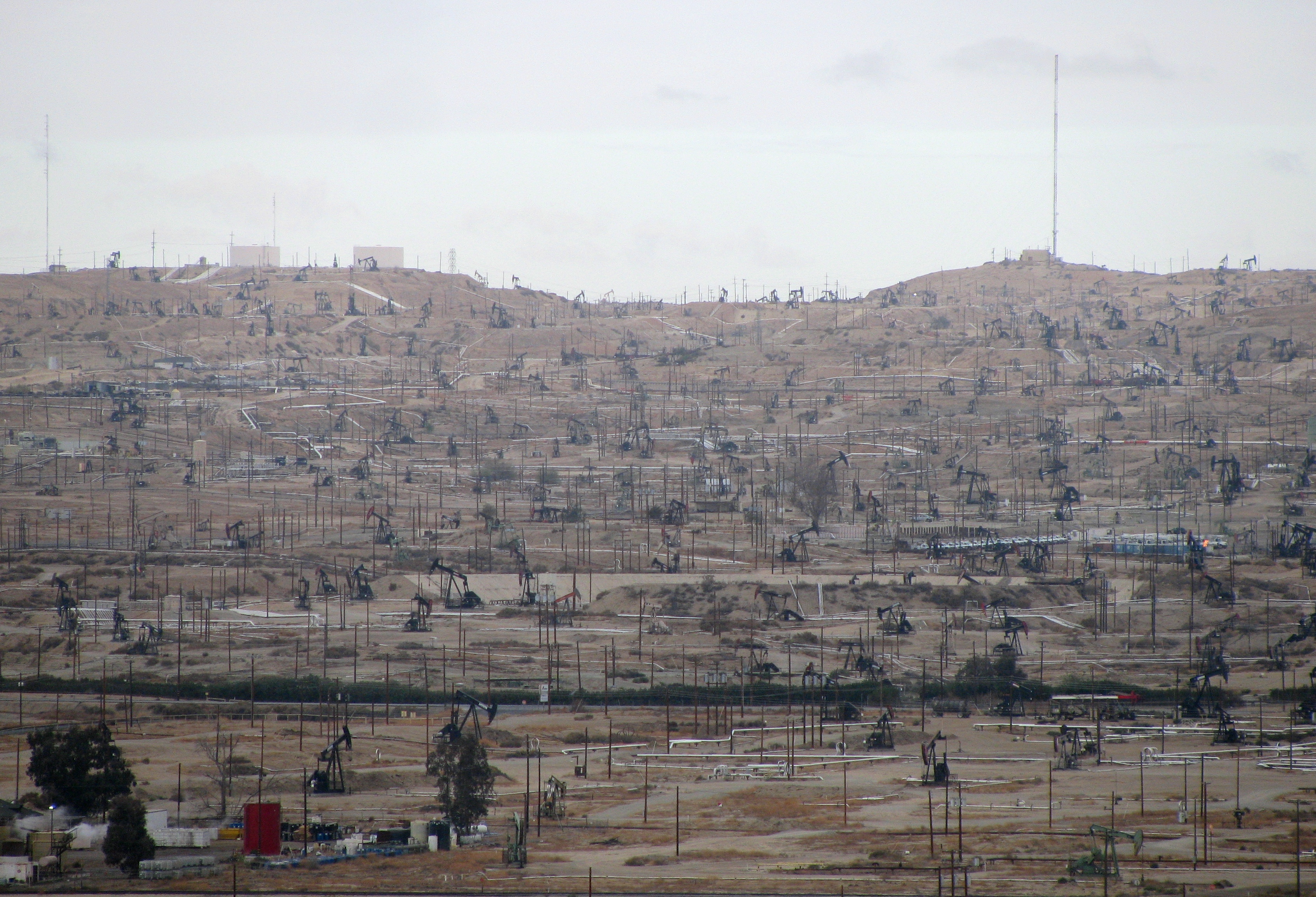
Kern River Oil Field; view from Panorama Park in Bakersfield, on the blufftop across the river. This is the most densely developed oilfield in California, and the fifth-largest producer (as of 2006) in the US.

The Kern River Oil Field covers an area of 10,750 acres (43.5 km^{2}) in a rough oval extending over the low hills north-northeast of Bakersfield, hills which are now almost completely barren except for oil rigs, drilling pads and associated equipment. This area is the densest operational oil development in the state of California: Midway-Sunset, which has more wells, is almost three times as large in surface area, for a lower overall density. Elevations on the Kern River Oil Field range from approximately 400 to 1,000 feet (120 to 300 m), rising towards the northeast, and the Kern River flows south of the field, from east to west, from the Sierra Nevada into the city of Bakersfield.

The oil field is one of many contiguous oil fields along the eastern edge of the southern San Joaquin Valley, lying between the Kern Front field to the northwest and the Kern Bluff field to the southeast, on the other side of the Kern River. Directly north of the Kern River field is the large Mount Poso Oil Field, entirely in the Sierra foothills, and to the northeast is the Round Mountain Oil Field.

== Geology ==
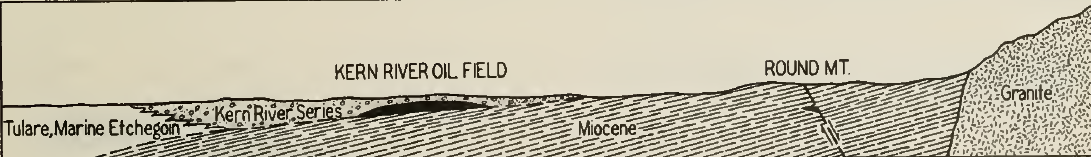
Kern River Oil Field Geologic Cross Section

Unlike some of the other Kern County oil fields which contain numerous pools, the Kern River field has one large pool, named for the field itself (the Kern River) and two smaller pools, the Vedder and Jewett, discovered in 1981 and 1985 respectively. The formation containing the Kern River pool is of Pliocene-Pleistocene age, and lies 400 to 1,300 feet (120 to 400 m) below ground surface; the Vedder and Jewett are of Oligocene and Miocene ages, respectively, with depths of 4,700 and 4,220 feet (1,430 and 1,290 m).

The deepest well in the Kern River Oil Field was originally drilled by Standard Oil of California, and attained a depth of 6,986 feet (2,129 m) below ground surface. The granitic basement rocks were of late Jurassic age.

== History and operations ==
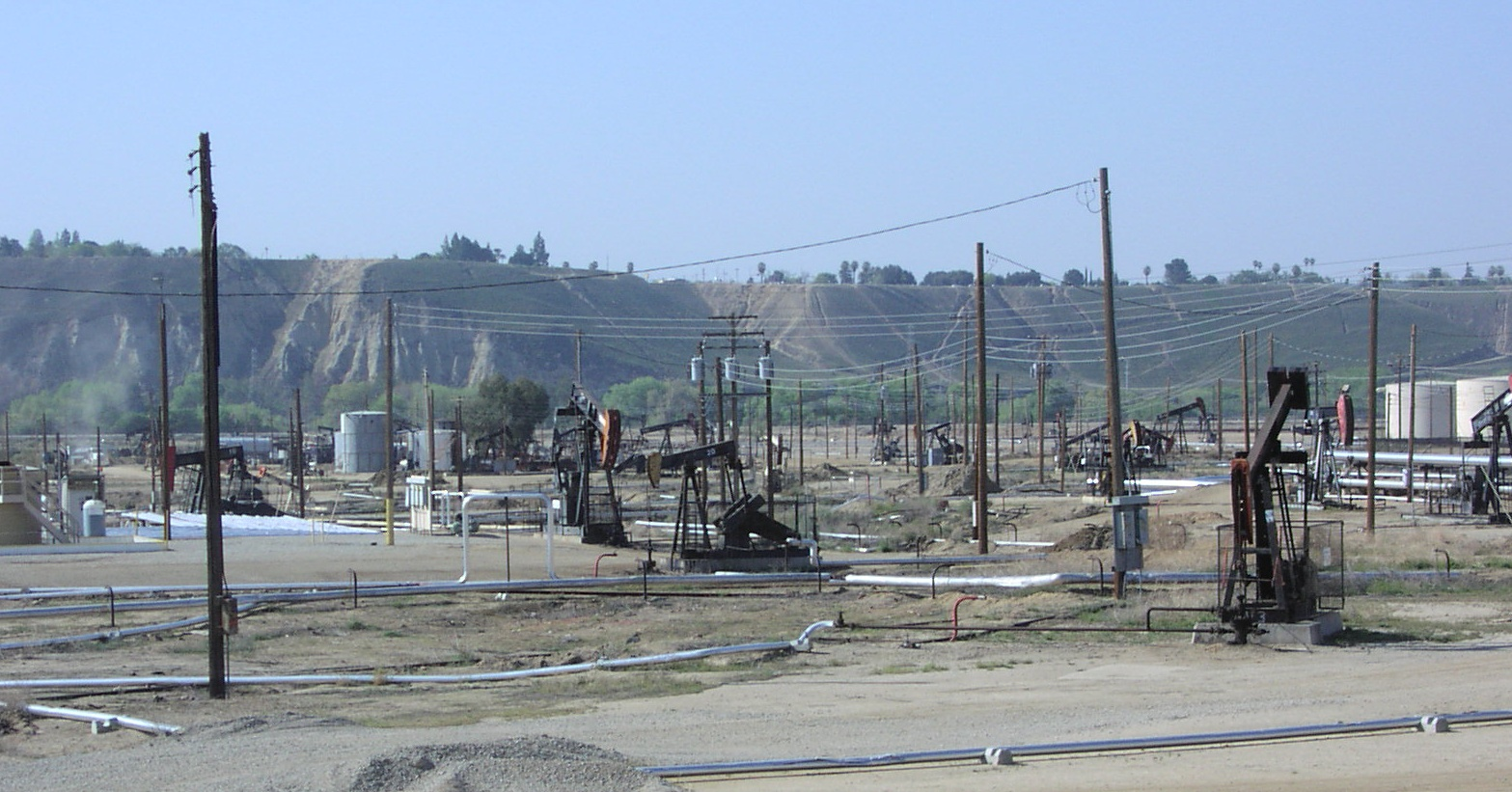
Area of active operations, along China Grade Loop

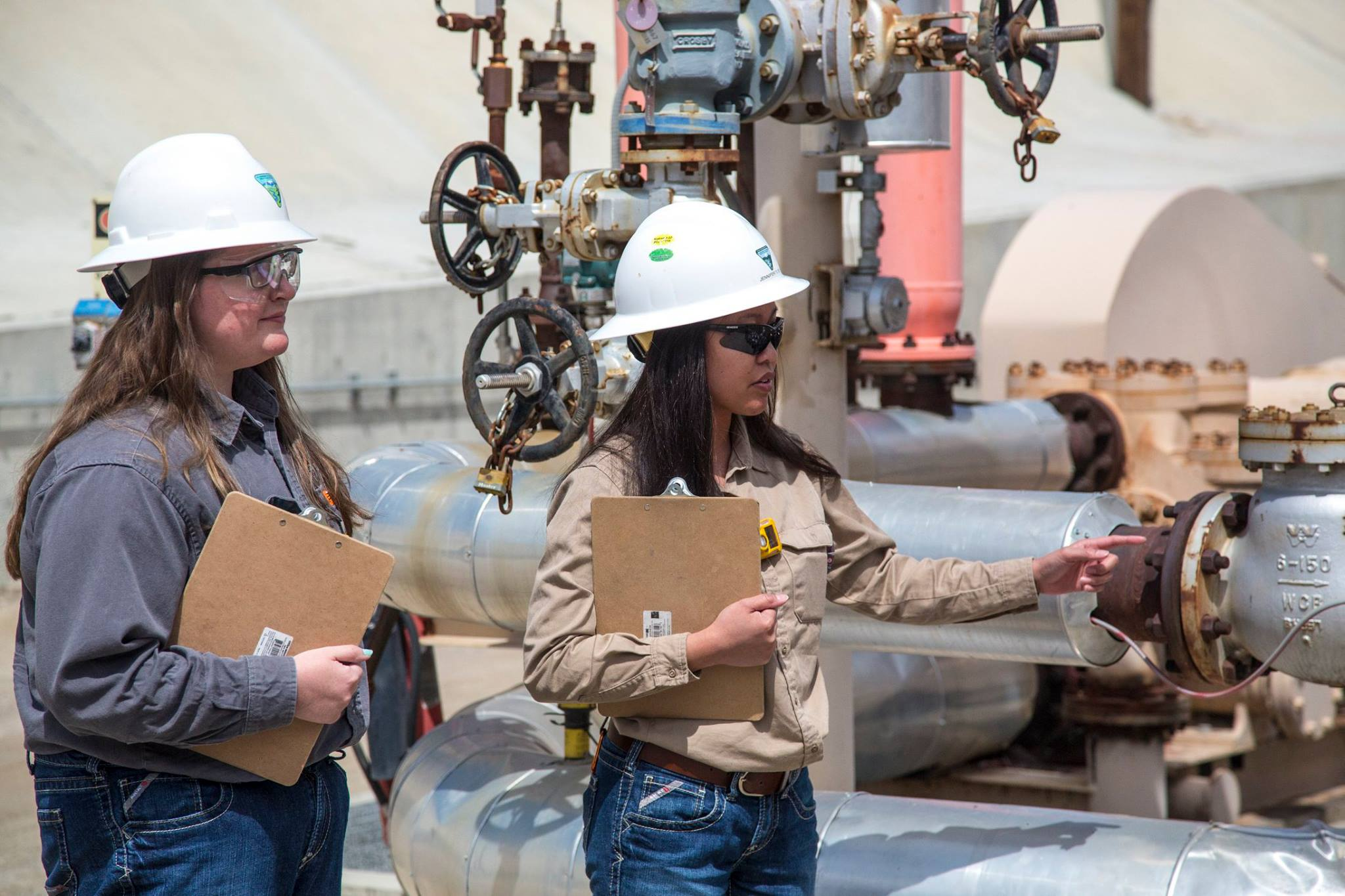
BLM employees inspect the Chevron water recovery operation at the Kern River oilfield, 2017. 500 thousand barrels of purified water are produced every day, irrigating 90 farms in the district.

According to a California State Historical Marker of the original site in Kern County, "Oil was discovered at 70 feet (21 m) in 1899, when Tom Means persuaded Roy Elwood and Frank Wiseman, aided by Jonathan, Bert, Jed, and Ken Elwood, George Wiseman, and John Marlowe, to dig here for oil. On June 1, 1899, 400 feet (120 m) feet to the north, Horace and Milton McWhorter drilled this region's first commercial well."

The current operator of the Kern River Field is Chevron, which has gradually acquired the field through buyout and merger with the various other operators, including Tidewater, one of the original developers of the enhanced production technologies that revived the field in the 1960s; Getty Oil; and Texaco.

While most of the oil has been removed from the field, enhanced production technologies such as steam flooding have made it possible to extract much of the oil once considered unfeasible to recover. A high price of oil also makes recovery of previously marginal pools attractive. Total estimated reserves of the Kern River field at the end of 2006 totaled more than 475 million barrels (75,500,000 m^{3}), which represented approximately 15% of California's 3.2-billion-barrels (510,000,000 m^{3}) reserve.

Annual oil production from the field was 70,000 bbd/d as of 2014.

Wastewater from the field was once allowed to drain directly into the streams dissecting the region, and thence into the Kern River. This practice ended in the 1960s and 1970s when more stringent environmental regulations were enacted both on federal and state levels. Wastewater now is treated in facilities specifically built for this purpose, and after the treatment, is used to irrigate crops in the San Joaquin Valley.

== California Historical Landmark ==
Kern River Oil Field
- Interactive map of Kern River Oil Field
- Location: On Round Mountain Rd, 0. 7 mi E of China Grade Loop, 7 mi NE of Bakersfield. Must call and make appointment to view the site and plaque.

California Historical Landmark
- Official name: Discovery Well Kern River Oil Field
- Designated: June 27, 1938
- Reference no.: 290

- Discovery well of Kern River Oilfield California State Historical Landmark reads:

NO. 290 DISCOVERY WELL OF KERN RIVER OILFIELD - Oil was discovered at 70 feet in 1899, when Tom Means persuaded Roe Elwood and Frank Wiseman, aided by Jonathan, Bert, Jed, and Ken Elwood, George Wiseman, and John Marlowe, to dig here for oil. On June 1, 1899, 400 feet to the north, Horace and Milton McWhorter drilled this region's first commercial well.

== See also ==
- California Historical Landmarks in Kern County
- California Historical Landmark
