= Kern Front Oil Field =

Oil and gas field in the Sierra Nevada foothills in Kern County, California, USA

Coordinates: 35.4844°N 119.0403°W

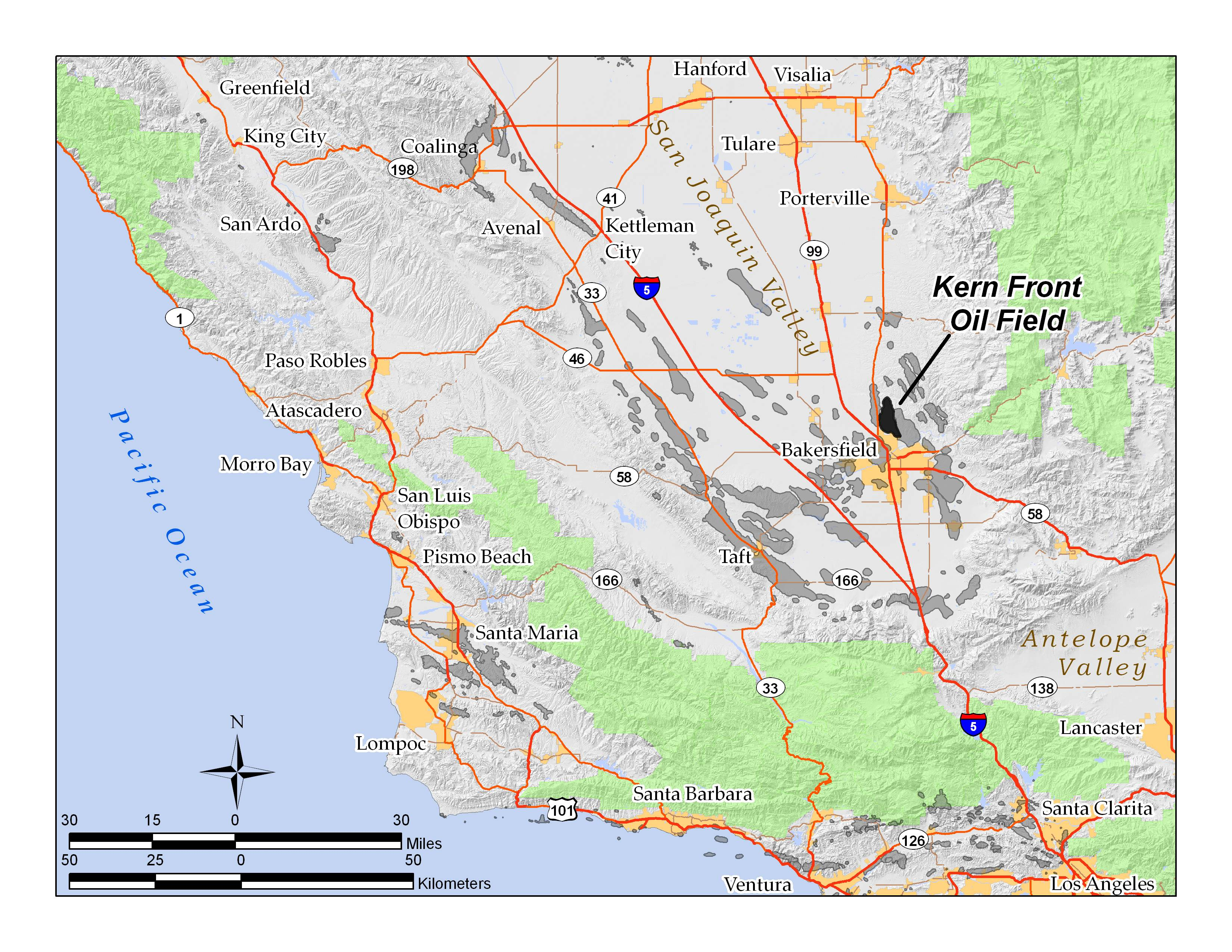
The Kern Front Oil Field in Kern County, California. Other oil fields are shown in gray.

The Kern Front Oil Field is a large oil and gas field in the lower Sierra Nevada foothills in Kern County, California. Discovered in 1912, and with a cumulative production of around 210 million barrels (33,000,000 m^{3}) of oil, it ranks 29th in size in the state, and is believed to retain approximately ten percent of its original oil (approximately 22 million barrels (3,500,000 m^{3})), according to the official estimates of the California Department of Oil, Gas, and Geothermal Resources (DOGGR). It is adjacent to the much larger Kern River Oil Field, which is to the southeast, and the Mount Poso Oil Field to the north.

== Setting ==
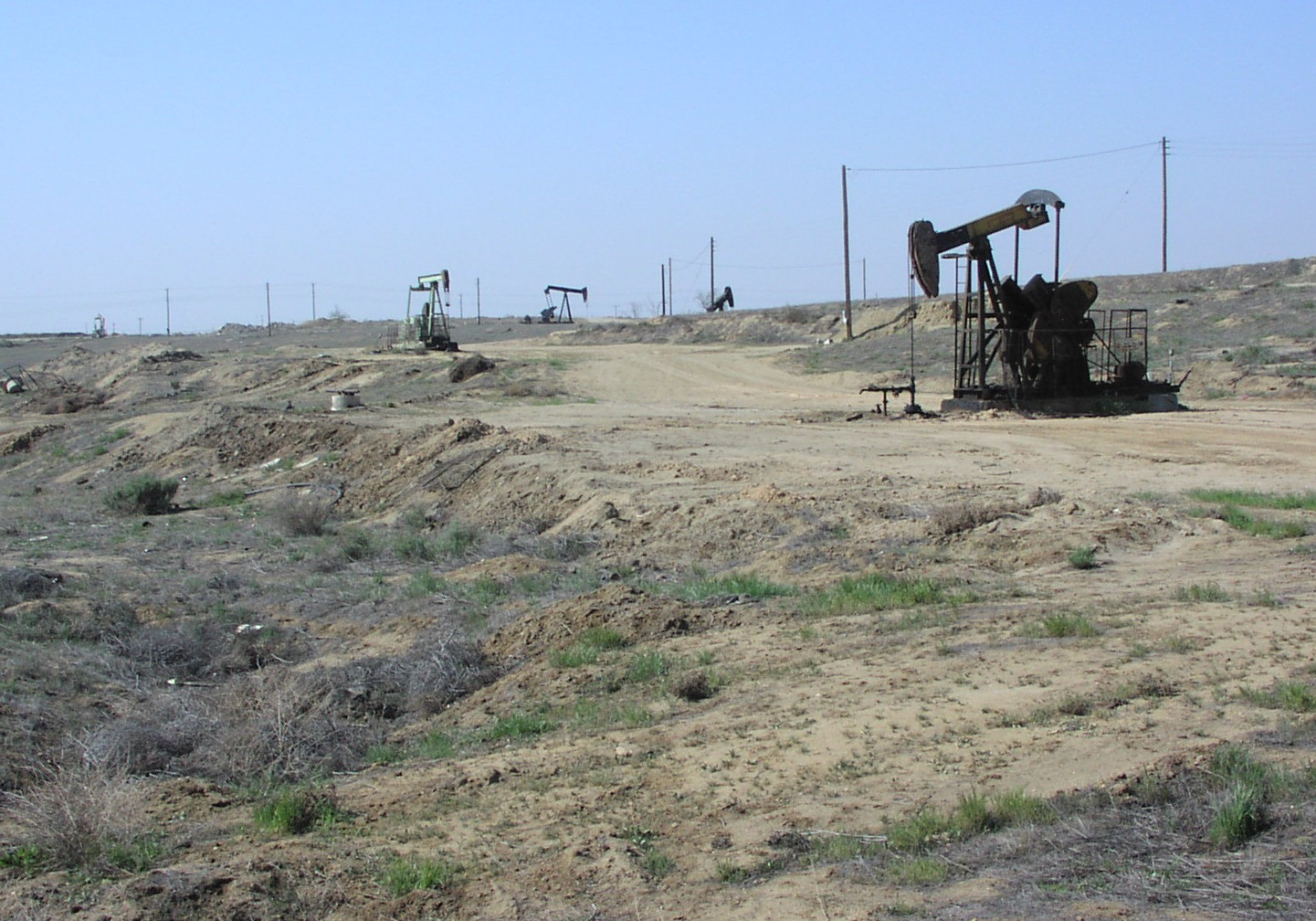
Oil wells and disturbed area on the Kern Front Field

The Kern Front Field is approximately 5 miles (8.0 km) due north of the city of Oildale, and 10 miles (16 km) north of Bakersfield, in the first gentle rise of the hills above the floor of the San Joaquin Valley. It is about 6 miles (9.7 km) long by 2.5 miles (4.0 km), with the long axis being in the north-south direction, comprising a productive surface area of 5,495 acres (22.24 km^{2}). Elevations vary from approximately 500 to 1,000 feet (150 to 300 m) above sea level. The field is spread out, especially compared to the exceedingly dense development in the adjacent Kern River Oil Field, which has one of the densest oil developments in the United States, with over 9,000 oil wells clustered in just several square miles. The Kern Front Field is bounded on the west by California State Route 65, on the southwest by James Road, and on the southeast by Bakersfield-Glennville Road. Oilfields Road runs south to north through the field.

Being within the ecological subsection of the California Central Valley known as the Hardpan Terraces, at an elevation of less than 1,000 feet (300 m), the predominant native vegetation is needlegrass. The climate is hot and arid, with summertime temperatures routinely exceeding 100 °F (38 °C); the mean freeze-free period runs from about 250 to 300 days. Mean annual precipitation is around 10 inches (250 mm), almost all as rain and almost all in the winter; summers are characteristically rainless.

== Geology ==
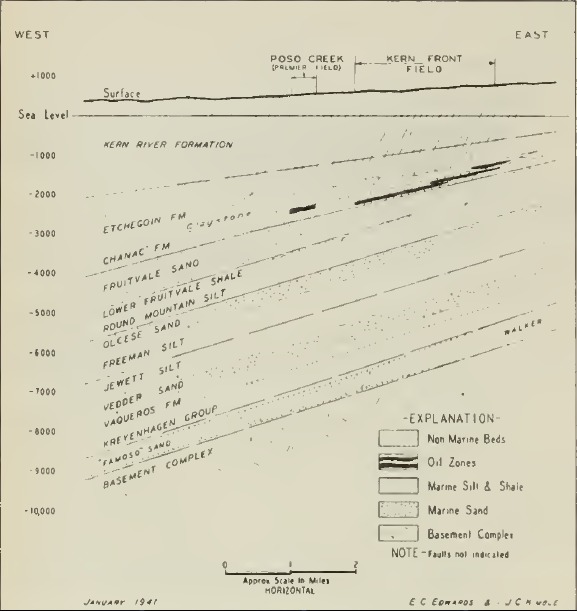
Kern Front Oil Field Structure Map

The Kern Front Field contains two major producing units, the Etchegoin Formation and the Chanac, both sedimentary, but unconformably overlain. The Etchegoin is a Pliocene marine sand, and the Chanac is a Pliocene non-marine sand. Each is interbedded with silts and clays, and the sands have a high porosity, ranging from 25-33 percent, making them singularly suitable as petroleum reservoirs. Overlying the Etchegoin and Chanac formations is the Pleistocene Kern River Formation, which is highly productive in the adjacent Kern River Oil Field. These units all have a northwest strike and a small southwest dip. A large north-trending fault on the east side of the field provides a structural seal on that side; on the northeast, the up-dip side of the field, the sands grade into relatively impermeable silts and clays, providing a seal in that direction. Many small southwest-trending faults run across the field. The California DOGGR recognizes only one producing pool – the Etchegoin-Chanac – and commingles the production data.

Many sedimentary units underlie these petroleum-bearing sands, but they either have not produced much oil or have not been completely explored. Basement rocks – the granitic complex representing the huge Sierra Nevada batholith, and probably of late Jurassic age – occur at a depth of approximately 7,000 feet (2,100 m). The deepest well on the Kern Front Field, the Atlantic Richfield Company "Kramer No. 1", reached a depth of 7,738 feet (2,359 m) before bumping into the basement complex.

Oil from the field is heavy crude, with an API gravity averaging 14, and a sulfur content of 0.9 percent by weight. Since this oil is heavy, it is viscous and flows easily only when assisted by steam injection or other enhanced recovery techniques.

The average depth of the oil bearing units is about 2,300 feet (700 m), and the thickness of the oil-bearing strata ranges from 100 to 700 feet (30 to 213 m). Since the depth of the oil is relatively shallow, the temperature is relatively low, at only 100 °F (38 °C) (many of the deeper zones in Central Valley oil fields produce oil over 200 °F (93 °C), a greater safety hazard to workers). In 1983, the date of DOGGR's data compilation, the water table in the field was at 2,500 feet (760 m) below ground surface.

== History, production, and operations ==
Standard Oil Company of California discovered the field in 1912 with the drilling of their Well No. 1, into the Etchegoin pool, to a depth of 2,836 feet (864 m). The well still exists, as Chevron Corp. Well No. 1. Peak production for the field was in 1929, during which 4,535,029 barrels (721,012.0 m^{3}) of oil were pumped from the ground.

Production steadily declined from that peak until the invention of the steam injection method in the 1960s. Cyclic steam injection (the "huff and puff method" began in 1964, and production again rose, as the heavy oil flowed more freely to pumping wells. In 1978, former operator Chevron Corp. began steam flooding in the southern portion of the field, and Century Oil Management did the same in the northern portion. Petro-Lewis Corporation tested steam foam solution and a steam foam encapsulated in a polymer gel to see if steamflood performance could be improved.

Gas production on the field peaked in 1980.

One of the current operators, Tearlach Resources, has claimed that the field may actually contain a potential reserve of 500 million barrels (79,000,000 m^{3}). This estimate is based on work done by the operators of the field in 1990, Mobil, ARCO and Occidental, and involves both recovering previously uneconomic deposits, as well as exploring deeper, previously unexplored zones, which some of the geologists believed may be petroleum-bearing.

As of the beginning of 2009, there were 838 producing oil wells on the field. If some of the current proposals for further exploration and development are enacted, such as those by Tearlach, this number could increase considerably.

Current operators include Bellaire, Vintage, E&B Natural Resource Management, West American Energy Corp., and a few others. The field operators deliver some wastewater from oil production to Valley Waste Disposal, with some wastewater being filtered and softened to make feedwater for steam boilers. Valley Waste skims residual oil and grease from the water, and the water is conveyed to Cawelo Water District, where it is re-used for irrigation.
