= Narcissistic Cannibal =

Single by Korn featuring Skrillex and Kill the Noise

from the album The Path of Totality
- Released: October 21, 2011
- Genre: Nu metal; dubstep; industrial metal
- Length: 3:14
- Songwriters: Reginald Arvizu; Jonathan Davis; Sonny Moore; James Shaffer; Jake Stanczak; Luke W. Walker
- Producers: Skrillex; Kill the Noise; Jim Monti (add.)

Korn singles chronology
"Get Up!" (2011)	"Narcissistic Cannibal" (2011)	"Way Too Far" (2012)

Skrillex singles chronology
"Ruffneck (FULL Flex)" (2011)	"Narcissistic Cannibal" (2011)	"Breakn' a Sweat" (2012)

Kill the Noise singles chronology
"Let's Ride" (2009)	"Narcissistic Cannibal" (2011)	"Lightspeed" (2012)

Music video
- "Narcissistic Cannibal" on YouTube

"Narcissistic Cannibal" is a song by American nu metal band Korn, released as the second single from their tenth studio album, The Path of Totality. It was co-produced by DJs Skrillex and Kill the Noise. The single was released to active rock and mainstream rock radio stations on October 18, 2011, followed by a digital release on October 24, 2011. It was released to alternative radio stations on November 8, 2011.

The song was made available for free download as a WAV file on Korn's official website from October 13 until October 16.

== Composition ==
Jonathan Davis said about the song:

"It's about me watching people who are so narcissistic destroy themselves. They basically eat themselves alive because of their narcissism. That's the gist of the story."

== Music video ==
The band filmed a music video for the track on September 27, 2011, at the legendary Roxy Theatre in Hollywood. The first 125 fans to show up got in for free to attend the shoot. It was directed by Alexander Bulkley and produced by ShadowMachine Films, best known for the Adult Swim television programs, Robot Chicken and Moral Orel. The video was officially released on October 21, 2011.

== Track listing ==
Digital single

1. "Narcissistic Cannibal" (album version) – 3:14

Remix EP

1. "Narcissistic Cannibal (Dirty Freqs Dub)"
2. "Narcissistic Cannibal (Dirty Freqs Mix Show Remix)"
3. "Narcissistic Cannibal (Adrian Lux & Blende Remix)"
4. "Narcissistic Cannibal (Andre Giant Remix)"
5. "Narcissistic Cannibal (Dave Audé Club Mix)"
6. "Narcissistic Cannibal (Dave Audé Dub)"
7. "Narcissistic Cannibal (Dave Audé Radio Mix)"
8. "Narcissistic Cannibal (J. Rabbit Remix)"

== Chart performance ==
"Narcissistic Cannibal" debuted at number forty-two on Billboard's Rock Songs chart for the issue date of November 5, 2011. It debuted at number thirty-four on Alternative Songs the following week.

== Charts ==
=== Weekly charts ===
Chart (2011–2012)	Peak position
Canada Hot 100 (Billboard)	97
Finland Download (IFPI Finland)	23
Mexico Airplay (Billboard)	41
UK Rock & Metal (Official Charts)	4
US Bubbling Under Hot 100 (Billboard)	17
US Dance Club Songs (Billboard)	31
US Hot Rock & Alternative Songs (Billboard)	15
Venezuela Pop Rock General (Record Report)	16

=== Year-end charts ===
Chart (2012)	Position
US Hot Rock & Alternative Songs (Billboard)	55

== Certifications ==
Certifications for Narcissistic Cannibal
Region	Certification	Certified units/sales
New Zealand (RMNZ)	Gold	15,000^{‡}
^{‡} Sales+streaming figures based on certification alone.
