= The Path of Totality =

Studio album by Korn
- Released: December 6, 2011
- Recorded: January–September 2011
- Studios: Korn Studios, Los Angeles
- Genres: Dubstep; nu metal
- Length: 37:45
- Label: Roadrunner
- Producers: Jonathan Davis (exec.); Skrillex; Noisia; Excision; Downlink; 12th Planet; Flinch; Feed Me; Kill the Noise; Datsik; Jim Monti

Korn chronology
Korn III: Remember Who You Are (2010)	The Path of Totality (2011)	The Paradigm Shift (2013)

Singles from The Path of Totality
- 1. "Get Up!" Released: May 6, 2011; 2. "Narcissistic Cannibal" Released: October 21, 2011; 3. "Way Too Far" Released: March 6, 2012; 4. "Chaos Lives in Everything" Released: March 22, 2012

The Path of Totality is the tenth studio album by American nu metal band Korn. It was released on December 2, 2011, in Europe and December 6, 2011, in the US. The album is a departure from Korn's usual sound and was produced by various electronic music producers such as Skrillex, Noisia, Excision and various other independent producers. "Get Up!", is one of three tracks produced by Skrillex, and was released as a download on May 6, 2011. "Narcissistic Cannibal" was released as the second single on October 18, 2011.

Regarding the album, vocalist Jonathan Davis stated: "I want to trail-blaze. I want to change things. I want to do things we're not supposed to do. I want to create art that's different and not conform to what's going on. We didn't make a dubstep album. We made a Korn album." The album was made available for pre-order on Amazon and iTunes on October 21, 2011, as well as special bundle packages available on Korn.com.

The album received mixed reviews. Revolver named it their album of the year in their 100th issue. Korn was also inducted into the Kerrang! Hall of Fame during the 2011 Kerrang! Awards.

== Background ==
The album features production by Skrillex, Datsik, Feed Me, Excision, 12th Planet, Downlink, Kill the Noise, and Noisia. Monti, and Datsik contributed to the mixing process. The band recorded The Path of Totality with electronic producers back in Davis' home studio in Bakersfield during inspired sessions. It was revealed by Jonathan Davis that vocals were actually tracked in the singer's home theater or in closets and hotels everywhere from Korea to Japan.

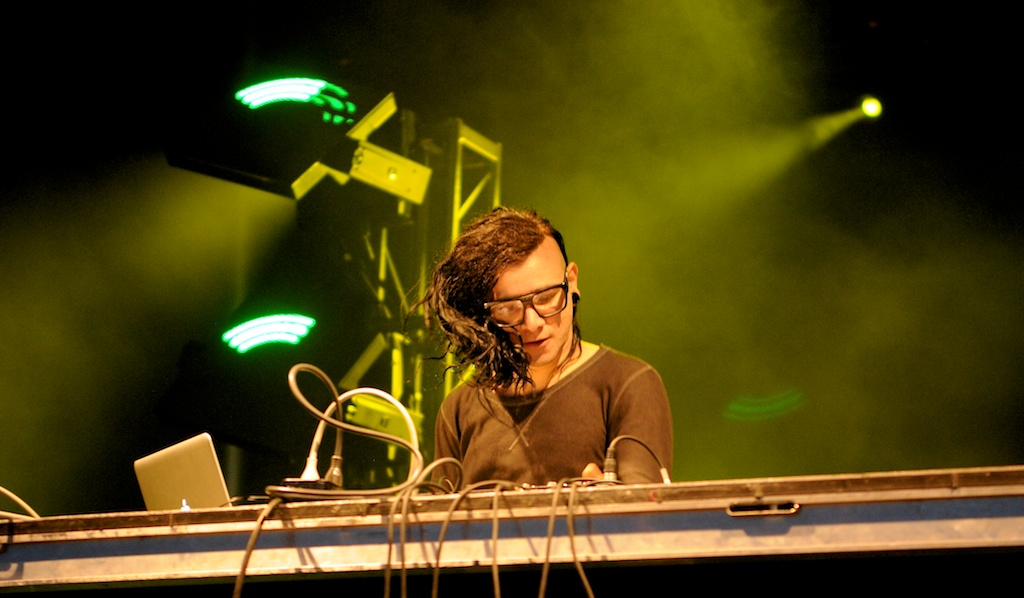
Korn collaborated with electronic music producer Skrillex on the album

== Music and lyrical themes ==
The Path of Totality is claimed by the band to be a fusion of their traditional sound with dubstep. Korn collaborated with a number of producers for the album with each producing their own individual tracks. Roadrunner released the following statement:

The Path of Totality is unlike any previous Korn release; it's an experimental record which finds the band shifting gears and exploring new territory. For the record, Korn collaborated with some of the leading dubstep and electronic music producers in the world, including Skrillex, Excision, Datsik, Noisia, Kill the Noise, and 12th Planet. The result is something completely new, yet utterly and definitively Korn.

Korn frontman Jonathan Davis describes the new album as "very well-rounded, with a mix of mellow, upbeat tracks; possibly the most well-proportioned Korn album of all time." In a new biography on Roadrunner Records' official website, Jonathan Davis declares The Path of Totality as "future metal". "We're mixing metal and electro music, and you're not supposed to do that. Since day one, Korn has always been all about going against the grain, experimenting, and trying to take music different places."

== Album title and packaging ==
The album title was revealed as The Path of Totality. "The title The Path of Totality refers to the fact that in order to see the sun in a full solar eclipse, you must be in the exact right place in the exact right time," says Jonathan Davis, explaining the story behind the name. "That's how this album came together. I think all the producers feel the same way. I'm not sure it could ever happen again."

Munky stated; "I wanted to come up with a name that felt otherworldly," Shaffer explained. "A shadow is cast on the earth when a solar eclipse occurs. The moon has to be perfectly aligned with the sun to create this flawless shadow that completely covers the sun from the earth. Similarly, all of the producers and writers had to come together at the perfect time to cast these songs onto tape."

The album is a standard 11-track album, with the deluxe edition featuring extra songs and The Encounter as a bonus DVD. The band's website also offered special pre-order packages that include a Path of Totality T-shirt and signed lithograph as well as the CD/DVD deluxe combo. Hot Topic offered a signed lithograph with pre-orders for a limited time.

== Promotion ==
Korn commenced a world tour to promote the album named The Path of Totality Tour, which offers special VIP packages. "Get Up!" was released as a promotional single, becoming a top ten hit on Billboard's Mainstream Rock Songs chart and would be featured in the soundtrack for EA Sports video game Madden NFL 12. The digital single has sold over 200,000 downloads in the US according to Nielsen SoundScan. A lyric video for the single was released on YouTube which accumulated over 3 million views and more than 35,000 likes. The second single, "Narcissistic Cannibal", was released to radio stations and digital music outlets on October 18 and 24, respectively; a music video was filmed in Hollywood by ShadowMachine (Moral Orel, Robot Chicken). A number of new songs have been added to the tour's setlist, including "Kill Mercy Within", "My Wall", and "Way Too Far". "Narcissistic Cannibal" leaked onto YouTube on October 11. It was later released for free download on Korn's official website as a WAV file. A lyric video was also released on both Korn's official YouTube channel and Roadrunner's channel as well. It has since accumulated more than 461,000 views and 6,200 likes. Hot Topic premiered a new track, "Sanctuary", on November 16. Roadrunner Records and Korn started streaming the album in full on December 1, as well as offering lead single "Get Up!" as a free download. "Way Too Far" and "Chaos Lives in Everything" were released as the album's third and fourth singles, respectively.

== Critical reception ==
Professional ratings
Aggregate scores
Source	Rating
Metacritic	58/100
Review scores
Source	Rating
AllMusic	4/5 stars
The A.V. Club	F
Consequence	C−
IGN	7.5/10
The List	4/5 stars
MusicOMH	3.5/5 stars
NME	6/10
PopMatters	7/10
Spin	7/10
Sputnikmusic	0.5/5 stars

According to the review aggregator Metacritic, The Path of Totality received "mixed or average reviews" based on a weighted average score of 58 out of 100 from 15 critic scores. Rock Sound gave the album an 8/10 rating, remarking that "It may not be perfect, but Korn have thrown caution to the wind and set out an impressive template for a future sound, for a band doing that nearly 20 years into their career, they deserve your respect". They do note however that the album sounds "a little formulaic" and "monotonous" at times. Spin gave the album a 7/10, saying "Thing is, dubstep's slithering textures actually suit Davis' demented croon". Henry Northmore from The List gave the album a rating of 4/5 saying that "the purists (both metal and dubstep) will probably hate it, but if you are willing to have your brain assaulted from every direction by a new Frankensteinian metal/beats hybrid, you'll find an album packed with pure adrenaline". AllMusic gave the album 4/5 saying that "despite all the electronics, there's no mistaking The Path of Totality as a Korn album...and one of their better ones to boot".

Alistair Lawrence from BBC Music criticized the album saying that "once the novelty of the squelching, space-aged din they've birthed fades, what's apparent is how little Korn have to say for themselves these days". Sputnikmusic strongly criticized the album giving it a score of 0.5/5 stating that "The Path Of Totality is a truly horrible album, built on a foundation of tired and overwrought stereotypes put together not by just a clueless band, but a bunch of equally confused artists who truly have no proper understanding of the genre they claim to be a part of". No Ripcord gave the album a 1/10 stating that "it is samey, ugly and spectacularly stupid at the same time". Jason Heller from The A.V. Club gave the album an 'F', stating: "To Korn's credit, The Path Of Totality is its most radical reinvention to date. It's also the worst slab of sludge it ever shat."NME gave the album a 6/10 saying that it's "not quite a car crash, but a near miss" and jokingly asking: "What do you do when you're 10 albums into your career, sliding down festival bills and trying to bury the tag of creators of a genre you now despise? If you're Korn, you Google '2011 music' and rope in a bunch of DJs for a 'dubstep' album, of course". On April 11, 2012, The Path of Totality won "Album of the Year" at the 2012 Revolver Golden Gods Awards. This was Korn's first ever win at the Golden Gods Awards.

== Track listing ==
All lyrics are written by Jonathan Davis.

Standard edition
No.	Title	Music	Producer(s)	Length
1.	"Chaos Lives in Everything" (featuring Skrillex)	Korn; Sonny Moore	Skrillex; Jim Monti (add.)	3:47
2.	"Kill Mercy Within" (featuring Noisia)	Korn; Nik Roos; Martijn van Sonderen; Thijs de Vlieger	Noisia; Jim Monti	3:35
3.	"My Wall" (featuring Excision)	Korn; Jeff Abel	Excision; Jim Monti; Downlink (add.)	2:55
4.	"Narcissistic Cannibal" (featuring Skrillex and Kill the Noise)	Korn; Moore; Jake Stanczak	Skrillex; Jim Monti (add.); Kill the Noise (add.)	3:10
5.	"Illuminati" (featuring Excision and Downlink)	Korn; Abel; Sean Casavant	Excision; Downlink; Jim Monti	3:16
6.	"Burn the Obedient" (featuring Noisia)	Korn; Roos; van Sonderen; de Vlieger	Noisia; Jim Monti	2:38
7.	"Sanctuary" (featuring Downlink)	Korn; Casavant	Downlink; J Devil; Jim Monti	3:24
8.	"Let's Go" (featuring Noisia)	Korn; Roos; van Sonderen; de Vlieger	Noisia; Jim Monti	2:40
9.	"Get Up!" (featuring Skrillex)	James "Munky" Shaffer; Moore	Skrillex; Jim Monti	3:42
10.	"Way Too Far" (featuring 12th Planet and Flinch (Note: "Way Too Far" is erroneously credited featuring 12th Planet in the CD album. It is officially credited featuring 12th Planet and Flinch as used in the single and most digital versions of the album.))	Korn; John Dadzie; Adam Glassco	12th Planet; Flinch; Downlink; Jim Monti	3:49
11.	"Bleeding Out" (featuring Feed Me)	Korn; Jon Gooch	Feed Me; Jim Monti	4:49
Total length:				37:45

Japanese edition bonus track
No.	Title	Length
12.	"Narcissistic Cannibal (The Juggernaut Remix)" (featuring Skrillex and Kill the Noise)	3:34
Total length:		41:19

Special edition bonus tracks
No.	Title	Music	Producer(s)	Length
12.	"Fuels the Comedy" (featuring Kill the Noise)	Korn; Stanczak	Kill the Noise; Jim Monti	2:49
13.	"Tension" (featuring Excision, Datsik, and Downlink)	Korn; Abel; Troy Beetles; Casavant	Excision; Datsik; Downlink; Jim Monti	3:56
Total length:				44:30

Special edition bonus DVD – Korn Live: The Encounter
No.	Title	Length
1.	"Intro / Uber-Time" (from KIII: Remember Who You Are)
2.	"Oildale (Leave Me Alone)" (from KIII: Remember Who You Are)
3.	"Pop a Pill" (from KIII: Remember Who You Are)
4.	"Inspiration" (Band Interview)
5.	"Need To" (from Korn)
6.	"Coming Undone" (from See You on the Other Side)
7.	"Bakersfield" (Band Interview)
8.	"Let the Guilt Go" (from KIII: Remember Who You Are)
9.	"Here to Stay" (from Untouchables)
10.	"Falling Away from Me" (from Issues)
11.	"Crazy Heavy Shit" (Band Interview)
12.	"Jam #1" (Band Jam Session)
13.	"Throw Me Away" (from See You on the Other Side)
14.	"Jam #2" (Band Jam Session)
15.	"Move On" (from KIII: Remember Who You Are)
16.	"Crop Circles" (Band Interview)
17.	"The Past" (from KIII: Remember Who You Are)
18.	"Jam #3" (Band Jam Session)
19.	"Freak on a Leash" (from Follow the Leader)
20.	"Jam #4" (Band Jam Session)
21.	"Are You Ready to Live?" (from KIII: Remember Who You Are)
22.	"Line-Up Changes" (Band Interview)
23.	"Jam #5" (Band Jam Session)
24.	"Shoots and Ladders" (from Korn)
25.	"I'm Happy Right Now" (Band Interview)
26.	"Clown" (from Korn)
27.	"Got the Life" (from Follow the Leader)

== Personnel ==
=== Korn ===
- Jonathan Davis – lead vocals
- James "Munky" Shaffer – guitars, backing vocals
- Reginald "Fieldy" Arvizu – bass, additional guitars
- Ray Luzier – drums, percussion

=== Production and additional music ===
- Skrillex ("Chaos Lives in Everything", "Narcissistic Cannibal" and "Get Up!")
- Datsik ("Tension")
- Feed Me ("Bleeding Out")
- Excision ("My Wall", "Illuminati" and "Tension")
- 12th Planet ("Way Too Far")
- Downlink ("Illuminati", "Sanctuary" and "Tension")
- Kill the Noise ("Narcissistic Cannibal" and "Fuels the Comedy")
- Noisia ("Kill Mercy Within", "Burn the Obedient" and "Let's Go")
- Jonathan Davis – executive producer, additional production ("Sanctuary")
- Jim Monti – engineering, mixing, additional production
- Downlink – mixing
- Datsik – mixing ("Tension")
- Ted Jensen – mastering at Sterling Sound, NYC
- ROBOTO – cover design
- Edward O'Dowd – package design

== Commercial performance ==
The Path of Totality sold 55,000 copies in its first week to debut at number 10 on the Billboard 200, making it Korn's eleventh album to peak within the top 10. The album has sold 270,000 copies in the US as of January 4, 2013 according to Nielsen SoundScan.

=== Weekly charts ===
Chart (2011)	Peak position
Australian Albums (ARIA)	32
Austrian Albums (Ö3 Austria)	24
Belgian Albums (Ultratop Flanders)	97
Belgian Albums (Ultratop Wallonia)	76
Czech Albums (ČNS IFPI)	39
Dutch Albums (Album Top 100)	81
Finnish Albums (Suomen virallinen lista)	36
French Albums (SNEP)	92
German Albums (Offizielle Top 100)	28
Italian Albums (FIMI)	56
Japanese Albums (Oricon)	29
Mexican Albums (AMPROFON)	96
New Zealand Albums (RMNZ)	28
Polish Albums (ZPAV)	46
Scottish Albums (Official Charts)	78
South Korean Albums (Circle)	91
Swedish Albums (Sverigetopplistan)	53
Swiss Albums (Schweizer Hitparade)	32
UK Albums (Official Charts)	68
UK Rock & Metal Albums (OCC)	2
US Billboard 200	10
US Top Dance Albums (Billboard)	1
US Top Rock Albums (Billboard)	3

Chart (2026)	Peak position
Hungarian Physical Albums (MAHASZ)	19

=== Year-end charts ===
Chart (2012)	Position
US Billboard 200	131
US Top Dance/Electronic Albums (Billboard)	6
US Top Rock Albums (Billboard)	35

=== Singles ===
Year	Song	US Alt.	US Main.	US Dance	CAN	UK Rock
2011	"Get Up!"	26	10	—	—	—
2011	"Narcissistic Cannibal"	18	6	31	97	4
2012	"Way Too Far"	—	38	—	—	—
2012	"Chaos Lives in Everything"	—	—	—	—	—
