= Get Up! (Korn song) =

Single by Korn featuring Skrillex

from the album The Path of Totality
- Released: May 6, 2011
- Recorded: 2011
- Genre: Nu metal; dubstep
- Length: 3:42
- Label: Roadrunner
- Songwriters: Jonathan Howsman Davis; Skrillex; James Christian Shaffer
- Producers: Skrillex; Jim Monti (co.)

Korn singles chronology
"Let the Guilt Go" (2010)	"Get Up!" (2011)	"Narcissistic Cannibal" (2011)

Skrillex singles chronology
"Reptile's Theme" (2011)	"Get Up!" (2011)	"First of the Year (Equinox)" (2011)

Music video
- "Get Up!" on YouTube

"Get Up!" is a song written and recorded by Korn, featuring the production of American producer Skrillex that appears on their tenth studio album, The Path of Totality. It was released as the album's lead single on May 6, 2011. Since its release, it has sold over 500,000 downloads in the United States. It was debuted live at Coachella with Skrillex. The song is also included on Roadrunner Record's XXX: Three Decades of Roadrunner box set on disc four.

== Music video ==
The music video, directed by Sébastian Paquet and Joshua Allen, shows Korn performing the song to their fans. It shows different footage; switching between Korn, fans, backstage, and the band's additional live musicians. It was officially released by Roadrunner on September 27, 2011. A lyric video was also created for the song which garnered over six million views on YouTube and more than 50,000 likes.

== Charts ==
Chart (2011)	Peak position
US Bubbling Under Hot 100 (Billboard)	8
US Hot Rock & Alternative Songs (Billboard)	21

== Certifications ==
Region	Certification	Certified units/sales
United States (RIAA)	Gold	500,000^{‡}
^{‡} Sales+streaming figures based on certification alone.
