= List of awards and nominations received by Korn =

Korn awards and nominations
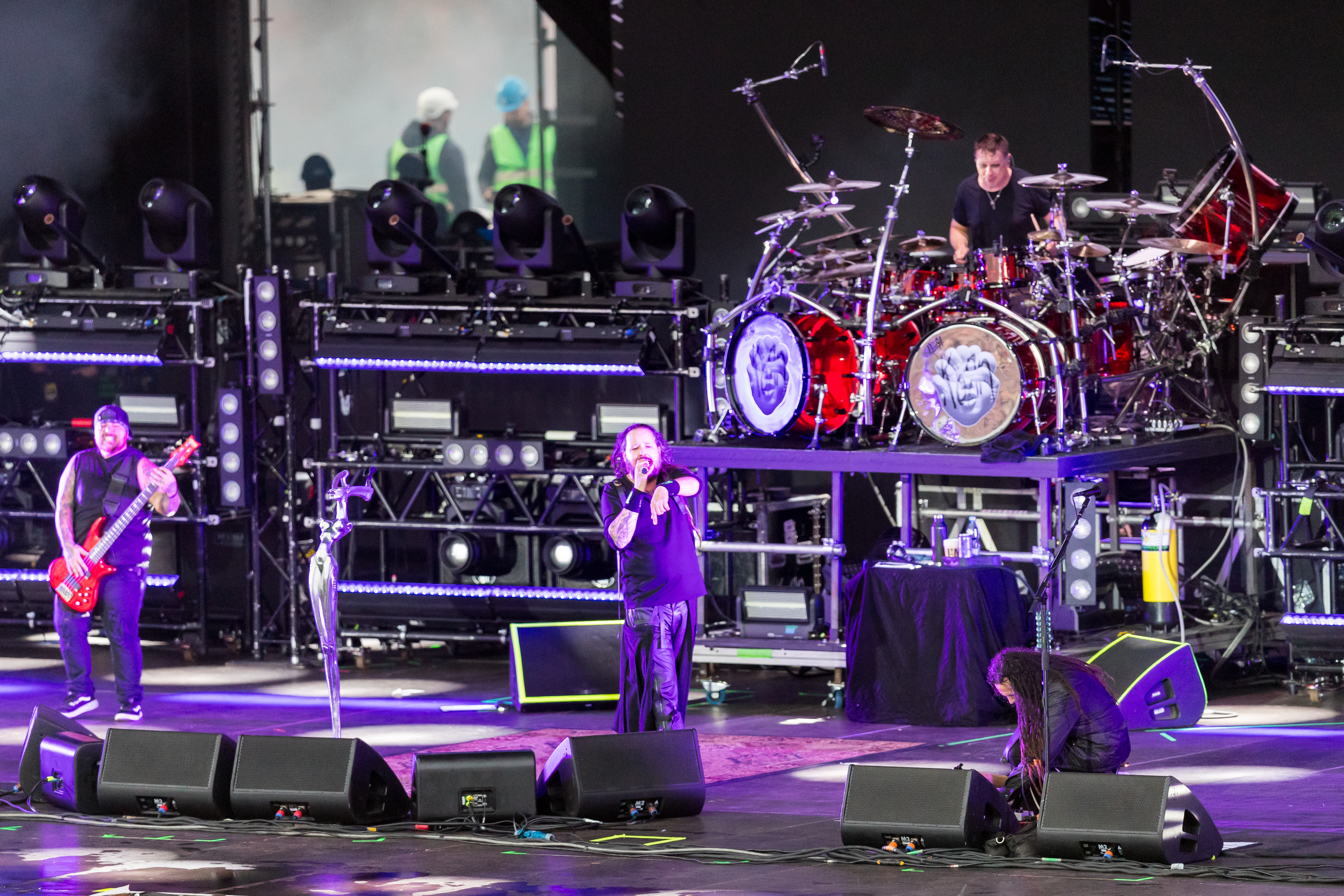
Awards and nominations
Award	Wins	Nominations

Totals (Note: Certain award groups do not simply award one winner. They acknowledge several different recipients, have runners-up, and have third place. Since this is a specific recognition and is different from losing an award, runner-up mentions are considered wins in this award tally. For simplification and to avoid errors, each award in this list has been presumed to have had a prior nomination.)
- Wins: 92
- Nominations: 184

Korn is an American nu metal band from Bakersfield, California, formed in 1993. The band's current lineup includes founding members Jonathan Davis (vocals, bagpipes), James "Munky" Shaffer (guitar), Brian "Head" Welch (guitar, backing vocals), and Reginald "Fieldy" Arvizu (bass), with the addition of Ray Luzier (drums), who replaced the band's original member, David Silveria in 2007. Korn was originally formed by three of the members of the band L.A.P.D. Among their awards, Korn has earned two Grammy Awards out of eight nominations and two MTV Video Music Awards out of eleven nominations.

== Alternative Press Music Awards ==
Korn has received eight awards, and thirteen nominations.

Year	Nominee / work	Award	Result
1998	Korn	Best Artist	Won
1998	"Follow the Leader"	Best Album	Won
1998	"Follow the Leader"	Best Album Cover Art	Won
1998	Korn	Best Live Act	Won
1998	"Got the Life"	Best Radio Single	Won
1998	"Korn"	Best Album of the 90's	Won
1998	"Family Values Tour"	Best Concert Event	Nominated
1998	"Got the Life"	Best Video	Nominated
1999	Korn	Brightest Hope	Nominated
2017	Reginald "Fieldy" Arvizu	Best Bassist	Won
2017	Korn	Best Hard Rock Artist	Nominated
2017	Korn	Vanguard Award	Won
2017	"Insane"	Best Music Video	Nominated

== AMFT Awards ==
Year	Nominee / work	Award	Result	Ref.
2016	"Rotting in Vain"	Best Metal Performance	Won	

== ARTISTdirect Online Music Awards ==
Year	Nominee / work	Award	Result
1999	Korn	Favorite Pioneering Act	Won
1999	Korn	Best Hard Rock Act	Won

== BDS Spin Awards ==
The Broadcast Data Systems, better known as BDS, is a service that tracks monitored radio, television and internet airplay of songs based on the number of spins and detections. Korn has received seven BDS Spin awards.

Year	Nominee / work	Award	Result
2002	"Make Me Bad"	100,000 Spins	Won
2002	"Here to Stay"	100,000 Spins	Won
2002	"Thoughtless"	50,000 Spins	Won
2005	"Did My Time"	50,000 Spins	Won
2006	"Got the Life"	200,000 Spins	Won
2007	"Coming Undone"	100,000 Spins	Won
2007	"Twisted Transistor"	100,000 Spins	Won

== Billboard Music Video Awards ==
Year	Nominee / work	Award	Result	Ref.
1997	"A.D.I.D.A.S."	Best Hard Rock Clip	Nominated	
1999	"Freak on a Leash"	Best Hard Rock Clip	Won	
1999	"Freak on a Leash"	Best Modern Rock Clip	Nominated	

== BMI Awards ==
The BMI Awards are accolades presented annually by Broadcast Music, Inc., honouring songwriters, composers, and music publishers in various genres. Korn has received 3 BMI awards.

Year	Nominee / work	Award	Result
2004	"Did My Time"	Most Played Song From a Motion Picture Soundtrack	Won
2008	Korn	Best Rock	Won
2009	Korn	Best Rock	Won

== BMI London Awards ==
The BMI London Awards are accolades presented annually by Broadcast Music, Inc., honouring songwriters, composers, and music publishers in various genres. Korn has received 1 BMI London award.

Year	Nominee / work	Award	Result
2005	"Another Brick in the Wall"	Best Pop Video	Won

== California Music Awards ==
Beginning in 1978 and continuing until the magazine ceased publication in 1999, BAM magazine presented the Bay Area Music Awards, also known as the Bammies, in an annual awards ceremony honoring accomplishments of the Bay Area music community. The awards ceremony continued for a couple more years with its name changed to the California Music Awards and absent its prior focus on the music of the Bay Area.

Year	Nominee / work	Award	Result
1999	"Follow the Leader	Outstanding Pop/Rock Album	Won
1999	Freak on a Leash	Outstanding Single	Nominated
2000	"Issues"	Outstanding Hard Rock/Heavy Metal Album	Nominated

== Circus Readers' Choice Awards ==
Year	Nominee / work	Award	Result
1999	Korn	Best Band of the New Millenium	Won

== Echo Awards ==
Echo Awards was a German music award granted every year by the Deutsche Phono-Akademie (an association of recording companies). Each year's winner is determined by the previous year's sales.

Year	Nominee / work	Award	Result
2001	"Issues"	Best International Rock/Alternative Group	Nominated
2003	"Untouchables"	Best International Rock/Alternative Group	Nominated

== Edison Music Awards ==
Award ceremony est. in the Netherlands

Year	Nominee / work	Award	Result
1999	Freak on a Leash	Best Alternative Act	Won
2000	Korn	Best Alternative Act	Won

== Gracenote Silicon CD Award ==
The Gracenote Silicon Award was first awarded to Korn in 1999 for achieving high sales. The award is given for having high sales.

Year	Nominee / work	Award	Result
1999	"Follow the Leader"	Silicon Award	Won
2000	"Issues"	Silicon Award	Won

== Grammy Awards ==
The Grammy Awards are awarded annually by the National Academy of Recording Arts and Sciences. Korn has received two awards from eight nominations.

Year	Nominee / work	Award	Result
1997	"Shoots and Ladders"	Best Metal Performance	Nominated
1998	"No Place to Hide"	Best Metal Performance	Nominated
2000	"Freak on a Leash"	Best Hard Rock Performance	Nominated
2000	"Freak on a Leash"	Best Short Form Music Video	Won
2003	"Here to Stay"	Best Metal Performance	Won
2004	"Did My Time"	Best Metal Performance	Nominated
2011	"Let the Guilt Go"	Best Metal Performance	Nominated
2017	"Rotting in Vain"	Best Metal Performance	Nominated

== Guitar Magazine Readers' Choice Awards ==
Year	Nominee / work	Award	Result
1998	"Follow the Leader"	Best Album of 1998	Won

== Hit Parader Awards ==
The Hit Parader Awards were created by Hit Parader magazine in the 90's

Year	Nominee / work	Award	Result
1998	"Follow the Leader"	Favorite Album	Won
1998	Korn	Favorite Band	Won
1999	Korn	No. 1 Band	Won
1999	"Issues"	No. 1 Album	Won

== Hungarian Music Awards ==
The Hungarian Music Awards are handed out annually by the Hungarian Recording Industry Association.

Year	Nominee / work	Award	Result	Ref.
2000	Issues	Best Foreign Rock Album	Nominated	
2017	The Serenity of Suffering	Best Foreign Hard Rock or Metal Album	Nominated	
2018	The Serenity of Suffering	Best Foreign Hard Rock or Metal Album	Nominated	

== Metals Edge Readers' Choice Awards ==
Year	Nominee / work	Award	Result
1999	"Freak on a Leash"	Music Video of the Year	Won
1999	"Issues"	Album of the Year	Won
1999	"Issues"	Album Cover of the Year	Won
1999	"Falling Away from Me	Song of the Year	Won
1999	Korn	Band of the Year	Won
1999	Jonathan Davis	Vocalist of the Year	Won
1999	Fieldy	Bassist of the Year	Won
2002	"Here to Stay"	Music Video of the Year	Won
2002	Korn	Comeback of the Year	Won
2002	"Untouchables"	Album of the Year	Won
2002	"Untouchables"	Album Cover of the Year	Won
2002	Fieldy	Bassist of the Year	Won
2003	"Did My Time"	Best Song From a Movie Soundtrack	Won
2003	Korn	Favorite Ozzfest Band	Won

== Metal Hammer Awards ==
Year	Nominee / work	Award	Result
1997	"Korn"	Best New Band	Won
1997	"Korn"	Best Live Band	Won
2014	"Never Never"	Video of the Year	Nominated
2017	Korn	Best International Band	Nominated

== Metal Storm Awards ==
Year	Nominee / work	Award	Result
2005	"See You On the Other Side"	Best Alternative Metal Album	Nominated
2011	"The Path Of Totality"	Best Electronic Metal Album	Won
2016	"The Serenity Of Suffering"	Best Alternative Metal Album	Nominated
2016	"The Serenity Of Suffering"	Biggest Surprise	Nominated

== MTV Video Music Awards ==
The MTV Video Music Awards were established in 1984 by MTV to celebrate the top music videos of the year. Korn has received two awards from eleven nominations.

Year	Nominee / work	Award	Result
1999	"Freak on a Leash"	Best Rock Video	Won
1999	"Freak on a Leash"	Breakthrough Video	Nominated
1999	"Freak on a Leash"	Best Direction	Nominated
1999	"Freak on a Leash"	Best Special Effects	Nominated
1999	"Freak on a Leash"	Best Art Direction	Nominated
1999	"Freak on a Leash"	Best Editing	Won
1999	"Freak on a Leash"	Best Cinematography	Nominated
1999	"Freak on a Leash"	Viewer's Choice	Nominated
1999	"Freak on a Leash"	Video of the Year	Nominated
2000	"Falling Away from Me"	Best Rock Video	Nominated
2002	"Here to Stay"	Best Rock Video	Nominated

== MTV Europe Music Awards ==
The MTV Europe Music Awards is an annual awards ceremony established in 1994 by MTV Europe. Korn has received four nominations.

Year	Nominee / work	Award	Result
2000	Korn	Best Rock Act	Nominated
2000	Falling Away From Me	Best Rock Song	Nominated
2002	Korn	Best Rock Act	Nominated
2002	Korn	Best Live Act	Nominated
2006	Korn	Best Alternative Act	Nominated

== MTV Asia Awards ==
The MTV Asia Awards is an annual Asian awards ceremony established in 2002 by the MTV television network. Korn has received one award.

Year	Nominee / work	Award	Result
2006	"Twisted Transistor"	Favorite Video	Won

== Music Television Awards ==
Year	Nominee / work	Award	Result
1999	"Got the Life"	Best Rock Act	Won
2000	Korn	Best Rock Act	Nominated
2000	"Falling Away From Me"	Best Music Video	Nominated

== Music Video Production Awards ==
The MVPAs are annually presented by a Los Angeles-based music trade organization to honor the year's best music videos.

Year	Nominee / work	Award	Result
2001	"Make Me Bad"	Best Makeup in a Music Video	Won

== Revolver Golden Gods Awards ==
The Revolver Golden Gods Awards is an annual awards ceremony established in 2009 by Revolver Magazine. This ceremony celebrates the best in hard rock and heavy metal music. Korn has received one award from five nominations.

Year	Nominee / work	Award	Result
2010	Jonathan Davis	Best Vocalist	Nominated
2012	Jonathan Davis	Best Vocalist	Nominated
2012	James "Munky" Shaffer	Riff Lord	Nominated
2012	Reginald "Fieldy" Arvizu	Best Bassist	Nominated
2012	The Path of Totality	Album of the Year	Won
2014	Jonathan Davis	Best Vocalist	Nominated
2014	Brian "Head" Welch and James "Munky" Shaffer	Best Guitarists	Nominated
2014	Reginald "Fieldy" Arvizu	Best Bassist	Nominated
2014	The Paradigm Shift	Album of the Year	Nominated

== Octane’s Year-End Awards ==
Year	Nominee / work	Award	Result
2016	Korn	Artist of the Year	Nominated
2016	"The Serenity Of Suffering"	Octane Album of the Year	Nominated

== Kerrang! Awards ==
The Kerrang! Awards is an annual awards ceremony established in 1993 by Kerrang! Magazine. This ceremony celebrates the best in hard rock and heavy metal music. Korn has received three awards from eight nominations.

Year	Nominee / work	Award	Result	Ref.
1997	Korn	Best New Band	Won	
1997	Korn	Best Band In the World	Won	
1997	Korn	Best International Live Act	Nominated	
1997	Korn	Best International Newcomer	Nominated	
1997	Life Is Peachy	Best Album	Won	
1997	"A.D.I.D.A.S."	Best Video	Nominated	
1997	"Good God"	Best Single	Nominated	
2000	"Issues"	Best Album	Nominated	
2002	"Here to Stay"	Best Single	Nominated	
2011	Korn	Hall of Fame	Won	

== Loudwire Music Awards ==
The Loudwire Music Awards is an annual awards ceremony presented by Loudwire Magazine. This ceremony celebrates the best in hard rock and heavy metal music. Korn has received seventeen nominations.

Year	Nominee / work	Award	Result
2011	Korn	Live Act of the Year	Nominated
2013	"Love & Meth"	Song of the Year	Nominated
2013	"Never Never"	Rock Video of the Year	Nominated
2013	Korn	Live Act of the Year	Nominated
2013	Korn	Rock Band of the Year	Nominated
2014	"Hater"	Rock Video of the Year	Nominated
2014	Korn	Live Act of the Year	Nominated
2016	"The Serenity of Suffering"	Metal Album of the Year	Nominated
2016	"Insane"	Metal Song of the Year	Nominated
2016	"Insane"	Metal Video of the Year	Nominated
2016	Korn	Metal Band of the Year	Nominated
2016	Korn	Live Act of the Year	Nominated
2016	Jonathan Davis	Vocalist of the Year	Nominated
2016	Munky/Head	Guitarists of the Year	Nominated
2016	Fieldy	Bassist of the Year	Nominated
2016	Korn	Most Devoted Fans	Nominated
2017	Korn	Hard Rock Artist of the Year	Nominated

== MuchMusic Video Awards ==
The MuchMusic Video Awards is an annual awards ceremony presented by the Canadian music video channel MuchMusic. Korn has received one award from three nominations.

Year	Nominee / work	Award	Result
1999	Korn	Best International Group	Nominated
1999	"Freak on a Leash"	Best International Video	Nominated
2002	"Here to Stay"	Best International Video (Group)	Won

== Drummies! Awards ==
The Drummies! Awards is an annual awards ceremony presented by Drum! Magazine. This ceremony celebrates the best drummers in many different music genres. Korn has received two awards from six nominations.

Year	Nominee / work	Award	Result
1998	David Silveria	Punk Drummer Of The Year	Nominated
1999	David Silveria	Drummer Of The Year	Won
1999	David Silveria	Mainstream Rock Drummer Of The Year	Nominated
2000	David Silveria	Drummer Of The Year	Nominated
2000	David Silveria	Best Alternative Rock Drummer	Nominated
2013	Ray Luzier	Best Rock/Metal Drummer	Won
2022	Ray Luzier	Best Rock/Metal Drummer	Nominated

== Pollstar Concert Industry Awards ==
Year	Nominee / work	Award	Result	Ref.
2001	Tour	Most Creative Stage Production	Nominated	

== Rolling Stone Music Awards ==
This is an annual awards ceremony established in 1989 by Rolling Stone. Korn has received three awards, and four nominations.

Year	Nominee / work	Award	Result
1998	Korn	Best Hard Rock Band	Won
1998	Korn	Best Rock Band	Won
1998	Korn	Best Tour	Won
1998	"Follow the Leader"	Best Hard Rock Album	Nominated
2000	Korn	Artist of the Year	Nominated
2000	Korn	Best Band	Won
2000	Falling Away From Me	Best Single	Nominated
2000	Korn	Best Rock Artist	Nominated
2000	Jonathan Davis	Best Male Performer	Nominated
2000	Issues	Best Album	Nominated

== The Full Marek Awards ==
The Full Marek Awards is an award ceremony handed out by Mark Lieberberg from Austria, Switzerland, and Germany to present the best artists in the US.

Year	Nominee / work	Award	Result	Ref.
2002	Korn	Best Artist	Won	

== Spin Readers' Choice Awards ==
Year	Nominee / work	Award	Result
1998	"Follow the Leader"	Best Album	Won
1998	Jonathan Davis	Cutest Boy Artist	Won
1999	"Freak on a Leash"	Best Video	Won

== SOCAN Awards ==
Year	Nominee / work	Award	Result
1998	Korn	No. 1 Album	Won

== CMT Awards ==
Year	Nominee / work	Award	Result
1998	Korn	No. 1 Album	Won

== Teen Choice Awards ==
The Teen Choice Awards is an awards show presented annually by the Fox Broadcasting Company. Korn has received one nomination

Year	Nominee / work	Award	Result
2000	Korn	Choice Rock Group	Nominated

== UK Film Festival ==
The UK Film Festival is an international film festival founded in 2011, held in London, England.

Year	Nominee / work	Award	Result	Ref.
2014	"Never Never"	Best Music Video	Won	

== World Music Awards ==
The World Music Awards is an international awards show founded in 1989 that annually honors recording artists based on worldwide sales figures provided by the International Federation of the Phonographic Industry (IFPI). John Martinotti is an executive producer and co-founder of the show. The awards show is conducted under the patronage of H.S.H. Prince Albert of Monaco, Monte-Carlo.

Year	Nominee / work	Award	Result
2014	"Korn"	Best Live Act	Nominated
2014	"Korn"	Best Group	Nominated
2014	"The Paradigm Shift"	Best Album	Nominated

== Žebřík Music Awards ==
Year	Nominee / work	Award	Result	Ref.
1996	Korn	Best International Surprise	Nominated	
1999	Korn	Best International Group	Nominated	
1999	"Falling Away from Me"	Best International Song	Nominated	
1999	"Falling Away from Me"	Best International Video	Nominated	
2000	"Somebody Someone"	Best International Video	Nominated	
2000	Korn	Best International Group	Nominated	
2002	Korn	Best International Group	Nominated	
2002	Untouchables	Best International Album	Nominated	
2005	See You on the Other Side	Best International Album	Nominated	
2005	Korn	Best International Group	Nominated	
2005	"Twisted Transistor"	Best International Video	Nominated	
2007	Korn	Best International Group	Nominated	
2007	Untitled	Best International Album	Nominated	
2007	"Evolution"	Best International Song	Nominated	
2007	"Evolution"	Best International Video	Nominated	
2013	"Never Never"	Best International Video	Nominated	

== Hottest 100 of all time ==
In July Triple J Hottest 100 of All Time, 2009 Korn had 5 songs in Triple J Hottest 100 of all time, #24 "A.D.I.D.A.S.", #5 "Got the Life," #17 "Freak on a Leash," #16 "Falling Away from Me," and #81 for "Make Me Bad", voted by the Australian public.

== Never Never Awards ==
Year	Award	Category	Result
2015	Canada International Film Festival	Best Music Video	Won
2014	Telly Award	Music Video – Silver	Won
2014	American Movie Awards	Best Production Design / Art Direction	Won
2014	Amsterdam Film Festival	World Cinema: Music Video	Won
2014	Williamsburg International Film Festival	Best International Music Video	Won
2014	NYLA International Film Festival	Best Music Video	Won
2014	BassAwards	Best Videoclip – Bronze	Won
2014	Berlin Music Video Awards	Best VFX	Nominated
2014	Los Angeles Cinema Festival of Hollywood	Best Music Video	Won
2014	Los Angeles International Underground Film Festival	Best Music Video	Won
