= A.D.I.D.A.S. (Korn song) =

Single by Korn

from the album Life Is Peachy
- Released: March 1997
- Recorded: 1996
- Studio: Indigo Ranch (Malibu, California)
- Genre: Nu metal; funk metal
- Length: 2:32
- Label: Epic
- Songwriters: Reginald Arvizu; Jonathan Davis; James Shaffer; David Silveria; Brian Welch
- Producers: Ross Robinson; Korn

Korn singles chronology
"No Place to Hide" (1996)	"A.D.I.D.A.S." (1997)	"Good God" (1997)

Music video
- "A.D.I.D.A.S." on YouTube

"A.D.I.D.A.S." is a song by American nu metal band Korn from their second studio album, Life Is Peachy (1996). It was released as the album's second single in 1997.

== Background ==
The title is an acronym for the statement "All Day I Dream About Sex" and indirectly refers to the popular sportswear brand Adidas. The backronym from the brand name dates to the 1970s. "All Day I Dream About Sex" was a recurring joke in the sports shop where Jonathan Davis worked in the early days of Korn.

When Korn began, Davis wore an army green tracksuit. He soon drew a "Korn" logo on one with a pen and presented it in live performances that included the bagpipes. He said wearing Adidas "was about breaking the mould, man ... it was about going against everything that metal was supposed to be".

From 1993 to 1997, the band established its style by wearing mainly Adidas T-shirts and tracksuits, which became a "trend" and unified their fan community. The clothing brand was also willing to provide them with free merchandise. Davis was described as having an "addiction and a mad obsession to sex", and "constantly fantasizing" about women, and claimed to be a "porn movie specialist". "A.D.I.D.A.S." contains the sexually charged lyrics: "I don't know your fucking name / So what? Let's fuck!". The song was a "wink" to the old backronym "All Day I Dream About Sex" and to the brand.

At the time, some said Korn was "indecent, vulgar, obscene, and intends to be insulting". Fans wearing the band's characteristic style of clothing with the "Korn" logo printed T-shirts were considered "not different than a person wearing a middle finger on their T-shirt".

While the term "nu metal" appeared shortly after 1998, Korn and Adidas had pushed the boundaries of the metal code; Davis later stated, "[O]ur attitude has always been punk rock".

== Live performances ==
The song was played at Woodstock 1999 to a crowd of 275,000. It remained a staple of the band's live setlist until about 2007, after which it was played far less frequently and performances ceased around 2009. In 2021, the song was performed live for the first time in 12 years and has since returned to the band's regular rotation.

When guitarist Brian "Head" Welch rejoined Korn in 2013, it was one of the songs he requested the band never play again. In 2003, there was an incident where Welch saw his daughter Jennea, then aged 5, reciting the explicit lyrics to the song, which was a contributing factor to him leaving the band and finding Christianity. He later recalled, "She was five years old, and I'm sitting there watching her sing 'All day I dream about sex'. That's not right. I don't care if she didn't know what she was singing. It still freaked me out. It's just not right for her to see her dad strung out on drugs, and it's not right for her to sing that song. It's like I was stealing her childhood or something."

The song was played live at the music festival Sick New World.

== Music video ==
It was filmed in Los Angeles with director Joseph Kahn and released in March 1997. The plot revolves around a car accident that causes the death of all Korn members at the hands of a pimp and his prostitutes. The police officers, firefighters, and paramedics secure the crash site. The corpses are placed in black body bags, where they appear to come alive and move violently. After that, they are transported to a grotesque morgue where a pathologist examines their corpses. When the band members are undressed, it's revealed that Davis is wearing stripper clothes. This is the only video where singer Jonathan Davis can be seen wearing one of his customized sequined Adidas tracksuits. The radio mix of "A.D.I.D.A.S." is used for the video.

When asked about the video in a May 1997 interview with Australia's The Buzz, Fieldy remarked "The director....it was his idea. He just did the Shaq video with the helicopter and he did the Westside Connection video. He has had pretty much all hip hop crap. Then he came to us with his idea, he knew that Jon used to work for the morgue in the coroner's office and all that crap so...We liked his idea and we're like - lets do it." Arvizu later claimed, "It was one of the hardest videos we ever made because we all had to lie still on cold metal slabs for hours, pretending to be dead. We wore dirty blue contacts in our eyes that made us partially blind while they were in."

== In other media ==
"A.D.I.D.A.S." played in a season 1 episode of Daria titled "Road Worrier", which originally aired on July 7, 1997.

That year, its music video appeared in an MTV program titled 12 Angry Mothers, which features a group of mothers who judge different music videos with a "yes" or "no". It received a unanimous "no".

== Reception ==
Stephen Thomas Erlewine of AllMusic praised the song. He writes ""A.D.I.D.A.S."—a kinetic funk-metal track allegedly built around the schoolyard acronym "All Day I Dream About Sex"—was Korn's breakthrough single, and deservedly so—it was arguably the best moment [on Life is Peachy].

=== Accolades and legacy ===
"A.D.I.D.A.S." ranked 24th on Australian radio station Triple J's annual "Hottest 100" list for the year of 1997. Mexican station 91X also ranked it 18th on their "Top 91 of 1997" list.

Noisecreep ranked "A.D.I.D.A.S." as the 4th best Korn video in 2013. They state "Pimps, hookers and Korn perishing in a car accident? That's not why 'A.D.I.D.A.S.' is one of the best Korn videos. It's the deft way that the band explored the seedy underbelly of a city and pushed shock value to the limit that makes it so."

In 2019, Loudwire ranked the song number six on their list of the 50 greatest Korn songs, and in 2021 Kerrang ranked it number ten on their list of the 20 greatest Korn songs.

"Direct a Korn video contest" winner Sean Dack took inspiration from the "A.D.I.D.A.S." video when directing Korn's "Alone I Break" in 2002.

== Track listing ==
=== Australian release ===
- CD 6641 77 2
1. "A.D.I.D.A.S." – 2:37
2. "Chi" (live) – 4:47
3. "A.D.I.D.A.S." (The Wet Dream mix) – 3:37
4. "Wicked" (Tear the Roof Off mix) – 3:46
5. "A.D.I.D.A.S." (Synchro dub) – 4:28
6. "A.D.I.D.A.S." (video) – 2:32

=== US release ===
- CD 49K 78530
1. "A.D.I.D.A.S." (Synchro dub) – 4:27
2. "A.D.I.D.A.S." (Under Pressure mix) – 3:55
3. "A.D.I.D.A.S." (The Wet Dream mix) – 3:35
4. "Wicked" (Tear the Roof Off mix) – 3:47

=== UK release No. 1 ===
- CD 664204 2
1. "A.D.I.D.A.S." (radio mix) – 2:32
2. "Chi" (live) – 4:46
3. "Ball Tongue" (live) – 4:56
4. "Lowrider/Shoots and Ladders" (live) – 6:15

=== UK release No. 2 ===
- CD 664204 5
1. "A.D.I.D.A.S." – 2:33
2. "Faget" – 5:51
3. "Porno Creep" – 2:03
4. "Blind" – 4:19

=== Austrian and Swedish release ===
- CD 664053 2
1. "A.D.I.D.A.S." (radio mix) – 2:35
2. "Ball Tongue" (live) – 4:56
3. "Lowrider/Shoots and Ladders" (live) – 6:14

Tracks 2 and 3 were recorded live at the Bronco Bowl in Dallas, Texas, on November 23, 1996.

== Charts ==
Chart (1997–2001)	Peak position
Australia (ARIA)	45
Australia Alternative Singles (ARIA)	8
Canada (Billboard)	71
Europe (Eurochart Hot 100)	87
Scottish Singles Sales (Official Charts)	27
UK Singles (Official Charts)	22
US Bubbling Under Hot 100 (Billboard)	13

=== Year-end charts ===
Chart (2001)	Position
Canada (Nielsen SoundScan)	168

== Release history ==
Release dates and formats for "Adidas"
Region	Date	Format	Label	Ref.	
scope="row" rowspan="3"	Australia	4 March 1997	Maxi CD		https://australian-charts.com/showitem.asp?interpret=Korn&titel=A%2ED%2EI%2ED%2EA%2ES%2E&cat=s
