= No Place to Hide (song) =

Single by Korn

from the album Life Is Peachy
- Released: September 1996
- Genre: Nu metal
- Length: 3:31
- Label: Epic
- Songwriters: Reginald Arvizu; Jonathan Davis; James Shaffer; David Silveria; Brian Welch
- Producer: Ross Robinson

Korn singles chronology
"Clown" (1995)	"No Place to Hide" (1996)	"A.D.I.D.A.S." (1997)

Music video
- "No Place to Hide" on YouTube

"No Place to Hide" is a song written and recorded by American nu metal band Korn for their second studio album, Life Is Peachy. It was released as the album's first single in September 1996.

== Charts ==
Chart (1996)	Peak position
Europe (Eurochart Hot 100)	70
Scottish Singles Sales (Official Charts)	22
UK Singles (Official Charts)	26
UK Rock & Metal Singles (ERA)	1
US Active Rock Top 50 (Radio & Records)	41
US Alternative Top 50 (Radio & Records)	40

== Live performance ==
The song has been seldom played since the promotional tours surrounding the release of Life Is Peachy. It is notable for being Korn's first televised performance, on a French music show on February 20, 1997. "No Place to Hide" made a return in 2011 during The Path of Totality Tour.

== Music video ==
A video was not filmed; MTV compiled clips from Who Then Now? and the band's previous music videos in order for "No Place to Hide" to receive airplay on the station.

== Awards ==
The song was nominated for a Grammy in 1998 for Best Metal Performance. It was Korn's second nomination in this category.

== Track listing ==
=== UK Releases ===
- CD5" UK Single Part 1 663842 2
1. "No Place to Hide" (Album Version) – 3:31
2. "Sean Olson" (Radio Edit) – 4:45
3. "Proud" – 3:14
- CD5" UK Single Part 2 663845 5
1. "No Place To Hide" (Album Version) – 3:31
2. "Shoots and Ladders" (Dust Brothers Industrial mix) – 3:50
3. "Shoots and Ladders" (Dust Brothers Hip Hop mix) – 4:07

Note: The two remixes are wrongly named, the Hip-Hop Remix it is the Industrial Remix and vice versa!

- UK 7" 663845 0

Side A:

1. "No Place To Hide" (Album Version) – 3:31

Side B:

1. "Proud" – 3:50
- CD5" UK Promo CD XPCD 2088
1. "No Place to Hide" (Album Version) – 3:31
- UK 10" Promo XPR 3086

Side A:

1. "No Place To Hide" (Album Version) – 3:31

Side B:

1. "Proud" – 3:50

=== German release ===
- CD5" 663811 2
1. "No Place to Hide" (Album Version) – 3:31
2. "Sean Olson" (Radio Edit) – 4:45
3. "Lies" – 3:22

=== US Promo ===
- CD5" ESK 8724
1. "No Place to Hide" – 3:31
