= Alone I Break =

2002 single by Korn

Single by Korn

from the album Untouchables
- Released: November 11, 2002
- Recorded: 2001
- Length: 4:16
- Label: Immortal/Epic
- Songwriters: Reginald Arvizu, Jonathan Davis, James Shaffer, David Silveria, Brian Welch
- Producer: Michael Beinhorn

Korn singles chronology
"Thoughtless" (2002)	"Alone I Break" (2002)	"Did My Time" (2003)

Music video
- "Alone I Break" on YouTube

"Alone I Break" is a song written and recorded by the American nu metal band Korn for their fifth studio album Untouchables. It was released as the album's third single in November 2002.

== Composition ==
The song deals with depression and suicidal tendencies that vocalist Jonathan Davis experienced during his life.

All guitars from "Alone I Break" were recorded with a custom-build Ibanez K-14 guitar, a double neck guitar.

The song is at the key of G# minor.

== Release ==
"Alone I Break" failed to gain as much airplay as the first two singles from Untouchables, barely cracking the top twenty of Billboard's Mainstream Rock Songs chart in December 2002.

== Music video ==
MTV supported a contest and a special program entitled mtvTREATMENT in which the winner, 25-year-old Sean Dack, was chosen to direct the video for "Alone I Break." It was shot in the form of a reality television show in which Korn singer Jonathan Davis kills members of the band. The video starts with the band performing in the downstairs foyer. Part way through the song, Jonathan turns towards Munky (James Shaffer) and acts aggressively towards him. This then leads to a short scuffle between the two, as Fieldy (Reggie Arvizu) breaks up the fight. Davis storms out, and is seen throwing things around in his room, apparently enraged. Meanwhile, Munky takes a bath but soon falls asleep, as Davis finds a lamp nearby and pushes it into the tub, electrocuting and killing him. Brian Welch is then seen looking around as the lights flicker on and off, implying that this is happening while Munky is being killed. On the balcony he speaks to someone on his cell phone, unaware that Davis is approaching. Davis pushes Welch off the ledge, killing him. David Silveria is seen sleeping with two women as Davis creeps in with a pillow. Davis quietly suffocates Silveria and leaves. He moves downstairs, where Fieldy is cooking spaghetti in the kitchen. Davis takes out a bottle of rat poison from a cupboard and waits. Fieldy goes into the pantry to fetch some more ingredients, as Davis pours rat poison in the sauce. Fieldy serves himself and dies. Davis walks outside toward the cameraman, who falls dead.

== Charts ==
Chart (2002)	Peak position
US Alternative Songs (Billboard)	34
US Mainstream Rock Songs (Billboard)	19
Latvian Airplay (LAIPA)	24

== Personnel ==
Korn

- Jonathan Davis – vocals
- Fieldy – bass
- Munky – guitars
- Head – guitars
- David Silveria – drums, drum machine
