= Life Is Peachy =

Studio album by Korn
- Released: October 15, 1996
- Recorded: April–July 1996
- Studio: Indigo Ranch Studios (Malibu, California)
- Genres: Nu metal; alternative metal
- Length: 48:14
- Labels: Immortal; Epic
- Producer: Ross Robinson

Korn chronology
Korn (1994)	Life Is Peachy (1996)	Follow the Leader (1998)

Singles from Life Is Peachy
- 1. "No Place to Hide" Released: September 14, 1996; 2. "A.D.I.D.A.S." Released: March 4, 1997; 3. "Good God" Released: November 7, 1997

Life Is Peachy is the second studio album by American nu metal band Korn. It was released on October 15, 1996, through both Immortal Records and Epic Records. After the release of Korn's 1994 self-titled debut album, the band reunited with Ross Robinson to produce and went back to Indigo Ranch Studios to record. Life Is Peachy features such themes as drugs, social encounters, sex, betrayal, and revenge. The album has fourteen tracks, excluding the hidden track after "Kill You". Martin Riedl photographed its cover art, and its title is credited to Korn's bassist Reginald "Fieldy" Arvizu. Life Is Peachy was Korn's first significant breakthrough, which came from constant touring after the debut album's release and building a fan base, thus fueling great expectations.

Critical reception for the album was mainly mixed, but its songwriting and sound quality were praised. Authors and music journalists deemed Life Is Peachy innovative, and some lauded Jonathan Davis for his vocal techniques and embodied singing. His vocal performance on "Good God" was viewed as encapsulating the album's essence, becoming one of the decisive elements in the development of what would later be called nu metal, which Korn pioneered. During its promotional period, newspapers and magazines defined it sonically as a metal album with hip-hop beats, presenting a unique sound.

Life Is Peachy debuted and peaked at number three on the Billboard 200 and peaked at number one in New Zealand. The album sold 106,000 copies in the US in its first week of release. It was certified gold by the Recording Industry Association of America (RIAA) in January 1997 and platinum in December of that same year. Life Is Peachy was RIAA-certified double platinum in the US in November 1999. By 2009, the album had sold almost three million copies worldwide.

Korn released three singles from Life Is Peachy: "No Place to Hide", "A.D.I.D.A.S.", and "Good God". All three singles went on the UK Singles Chart. Shortly before the album's release, Korn launched the Life Is Peachy Tour in the US with Limp Bizkit as the opening act. After its release, the band toured in support of Metallica in the US. Korn then embarked on its headlining tour throughout the UK, Europe, North America, and Australia, with often sold-out shows. The band also took part in the 1997 Lollapalooza summer tour, where the Life Is Peachy Tour ended abruptly due to guitarist James "Munky" Shaffer being diagnosed with viral meningitis. Life Is Peachy earned Korn a 1997 Kerrang! Awards for Best Album. "No Place to Hide" received a nomination for Best Metal Performance at the 40th Annual Grammy Awards.

== Background ==
Korn had played between 200 and 250 shows in the year following the release of their 1994 self-titled debut album. As a result, Korn topped the Billboard's Heatseekers Albums chart in the week ending September 30, 1995. In early October 1995, it began moving up on the Billboard 200 chart and reached sales of 154,000 units. Both chart performances were uncommon successes at that time as Korn was one of the first new non-mainstream bands to enter the top half of the Billboard 200 over the prior two years. Korn was also the only debut album displaying such aggressiveness to have achieved this distinction on the Billboard 200 during that timeline.

Korn's debut album's weekly sales stood at 17,000 and 27,000 in the first half of January 1996, as the band's recognition increased. The album was certified gold by the RIAA for 500,000 copies sold on January 29, 1996. In February 1996, Korn and Deftones were the opening acts for Ozzy Osbourne's US arena tour.

After fourteen months of touring to promote the debut album, Korn took a month off and began writing material for the next studio effort, Life Is Peachy. At this point, Korn's members had difficulty projecting themselves into the future because they had spent their last few years under the influence of drugs and alcohol, being only sober when performing. As they had to begin writing new songs, the musicians were in "a serious state of disarray" but would not stop their partying habits. Meanwhile, "the buzz" on Korn "was huge".

== Writing and recording ==
Lead singer Jonathan Davis said regarding the writing of the second album, "Right after we got done touring with Ozzy Osbourne, Ross [Robinson] hooked up with us. We went into a rehearsal studio and started writing." Knowing that they had tight deadlines to meet, the pattern that followed would be "faster and thrashier". However, Davis had begun writing part of the song "Mr. Rogers" while on tour in the fall of 1995. Guitarist James "Munky" Shaffer described the writing process as, "We didn't write nothin' for two years then we had creativity build up, like blue balls of creativity."

Korn entered pre-production and wrote the first songs of the album, "No Place to Hide" and "A.D.I.D.A.S.", at their rehearsal space, Underground Chicken Sound in Huntington Beach. (Note: At the time of Life Is Peachy's pre-production, sales figures of 12,000 copies a week of 1994's Korn were reported.) Drummer David Silveria said, "somebody will start playing something and the rest of us will work around it and see where it goes", mentioning the songs "Twist" and "Good God" whose beats came first. In this location, they developed an approach to songwriting whereby they would elaborate on the elements that had previously established them, such as Davis when he was "freaking out"; thus, the song "Twist" emerged. This contrasted with the production process of Korn, as some songs and guitar riffs had been prepared years before they actually began. Furthermore, the steady touring and the crowd's responses generated the band's punk rock "feel and attitude", resulting in dissonant guitar playing on Life Is Peachy; "We wanted to create a really angry album", said Shaffer. Davis then added his vocals to the jams. While working on the album, they consumed "mass quantities" of alcoholic beverages and were often so "high" that most nights, one of the band members passed out and therefore could not play his instrument, especially guitarist Brian "Head" Welch. Korn's productive sessions were often interrupted due to their debaucherous lifestyle, and Robinson struggled to get them to stop drinking to focus instead on songwriting and rehearsing. The band members mixed alcohol and drugs and also fought frequently. Davis recalled engaging in aggressive behaviors toward his bandmates, often biting them, due to alcohol abuse.

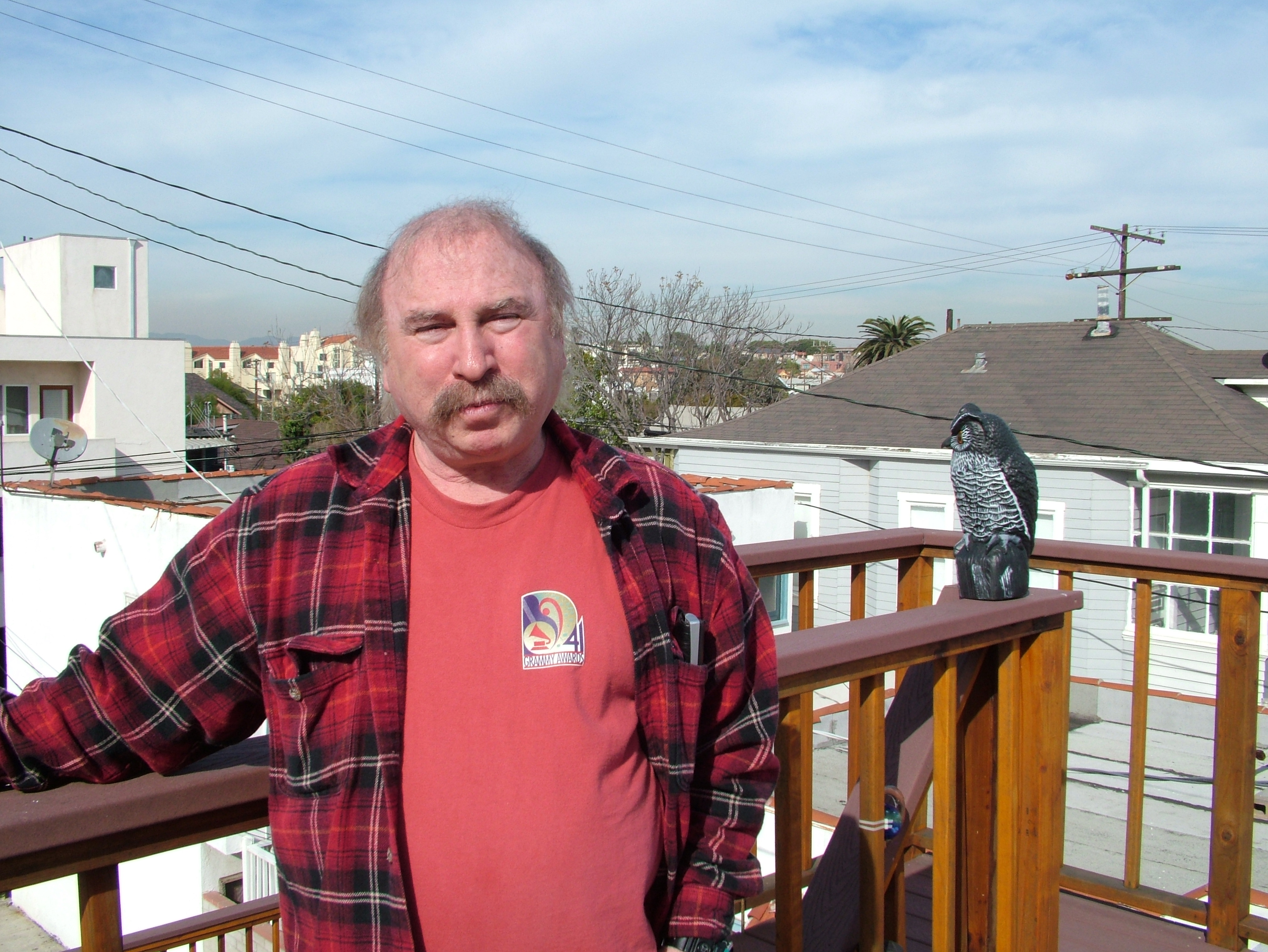
Richard Kaplan (pictured in 2009)

After playing at a few gigs with Deftones in California, Korn returned to the studio to start tracking Life Is Peachy in April 1996. Korn and Robinson reunited to produce and begin recording at Indigo Ranch Studios in Malibu, California. It was mainly because their first album had been recorded there and was a success. Bassist Reginald "Fieldy" Arvizu said, "We wanted that same energy and inspiration we found up in the Malibu Hills." Davis said working with Robinson was essential as he was connected to the band since his involvement on the first album; he also knew how to capture their live energy and motivate them to focus in the recording studio. "Fortunately, he's here to kick our asses. Otherwise, we wouldn't be very... motivated!", said Davis. After engineering Korn's debut album, Richard Kaplan, co-founder and owner of Indigo Ranch Studios, returned to work on Life Is Peachy. Initially, Kaplan's assistant, Chuck Johnson, was hired by Robinson to be his "house engineer". The album was primarily written in the studio as the band was less inspired on the road, although work had begun when returning to rehearsals. Back at Indigo Ranch Studios, Korn used methamphetamine as they did when recording their 1994 debut album. The band launched their first-ever internet webcast, called Korn Mangling the Web, through a partnership with QuickTime, allowing viewers to watch Life Is Peachy's development at Indigo Ranch Studios.

In an early 1997 interview for Bass Player, Arvizu shed light on the components that contributed to his approach to the instrument: "I try to cross hip-hop's beats and bass lines with sickness." Welch and Shaffer wanted diversity, desiring to become more melodic and approaching their guitars "more like a keyboard" by removing the attack to bring a more atmospheric sound while keeping their heavy trademark sound. Both moved in a more experimental direction with volume swells and different effects pedals. Although the two guitarists bought US$2,000 worth of pedals for the album, Arvizu, on the other hand, had not used any bass effects. The whole band contributed to the songwriting process, but Arvizu had a distinct influence on musical decisions. Arvizu came up with his parts, then Shaffer and Welch adapted their work so as not to "run all over" the bass, or otherwise, the guitar parts were done first, and he conceived his bass lines to go over them. The two guitarists appreciated this method because, according to Arvizu, "it doesn't make our sound so typically metal". Arvizu felt he was not gaining the upper hand over his fellow musicians as the guitar work was still audible in the sounds, but explained that it "adds a different dimension for the bass". Adopting a different approach to the debut album, Silveria explained that for Life Is Peachy, "we went in really fresh, and we wanted to get it done quickly to capture that energy". Sixty percent of what he would play was planned, and forty percent was more a matter of creative spontaneity. Silveria felt that he would not have conveyed the same "energy" if the entirety of his drum parts had been written beforehand. The music was created first, and then each piece was identified by untypical titles, such as "Dick Nose", after which Davis began to write the lyrics. Apart from the cover versions of "Lowrider" and "Wicked", the album's lyrics were entirely written by Davis, who found inspiration in a place called Magic Room in Los Angeles. Davis often felt drained and exhausted from his writing sessions. "Ass Itch" was the last song Davis wrote, and finally, the songs were renamed after he had finished his work. Author Doug Small wrote that "the band's songwriting method—a sort of collective building process wherein four instrumentalists, with the input of Jonathan, develop each other's ideas until they've created a monster—is truly a group effort."

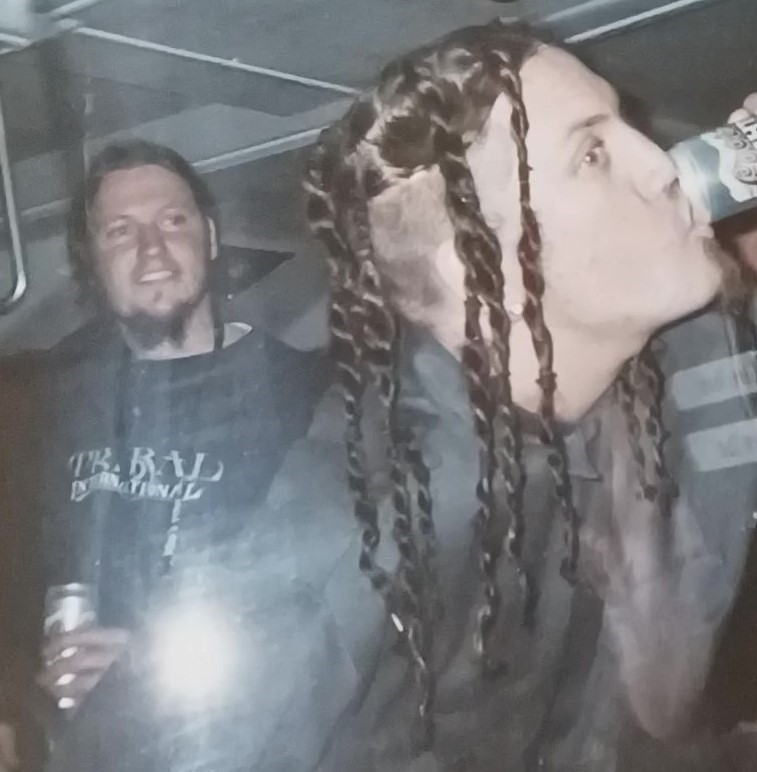
Danny Hamilton (left) and Brian Welch. Hamilton filmed footage of Korn's inception from 1993 onward and the recording process for Life Is Peachy, which later appeared in the 1997 video Who Then Now?.

For the recording, Arvizu had set up one of his Mesa/Boogie "heads" (separate bass amplifiers) along with a single 4x10" bass speaker cabinet with the "horn miked". The bass sound heard on Life Is Peachy was "my miked amp", said Arvizu, adding that the "direct signal was all the way off". Arvizu used an Ibanez SR1305 Soundgear 5-string bass to record the entire album, as on 1994's Korn. An experienced slap bass player, he used tones and mastered various techniques, such as pulling up on four strings, unlike most bassists, to make his bass stand out. Arvizu invariably preferred to play his bass while looking through the isolation booth's glass facing his fellow musicians. Silveria achieved the high-pitched sound by using a 20" kick drum and a 3 1/2" piccolo snare. He finished tracking drums in five days. Davis' vocals were recorded in a slightly different configuration than on the debut album; thus, he was never alone, or the other band members were facing him. To achieve an unequivocal result when recording vocals in the isolation booth, Robinson urged Davis to put himself back in the context that inspired his lyrics or used physical force. Sixty to seventy percent of Davis' vocals on the album were captured on the first take. Welch recalled the spontaneity of Davis: "Once [Jonathan] did 'Twist,' it was, like, 'What in the hell was that?' ... And we were like, 'Let's open the record with that. And people will be like, 'What? What is this?' No one ever has done that.' ... We looked at [Jonathan after he had recorded his vocals]. We were like, 'Who are you?'" Welch got to sing on "Lowrider" as a birthday present.

Kaplan said he mixed the album himself as Johnson never showed up but would eventually reappear at the end of the sessions. (Note: Kaplan said he never held a grudge against Johnson and had always esteemed him highly. After a certain length of time, Robinson fired Johnson because he was not dependable. Kaplan died from leukemia in 2014.) Robinson mixed the song "K@#Ø%!". Life Is Peachy was mixed at Indigo Ranch Studios and mastered by Eddy Schreyer at Oasis Mastering in Studio City. In the end, a fifteenth song, "Proud", would not appear on the final tracklist that would make up the album. It was completed in July 1996. The album cost $150,000 to make. Small insisted Life Is Peachy was rushed when it was put together but praised its "unique" sound.

=== Later developments ===
Excerpts from the album's recording sessions at Indigo Ranch Studios appeared in Korn's 1997 biographical video Who Then Now?, which was entirely filmed by the band's crew member and archivist Danny "Ham Cam" Hamilton. In 2002, Arvizu said he enjoyed the album much more than in the past. "A good pissed-off record", he said. Welch would later say that he did not really like the direction the band was taking artistically, but not on Life Is Peachy. In 2015, Davis said even though Life Is Peachy was a "killer" record, it was not among his favorite Korn albums due to its rushed production, mentioning that the only reason was the pressure of constant touring. He added: "But yeah, very rushed, very raw, it's still a cool-ass record."

== Music and lyrical themes ==
"Good God"
A sample of "Good God", the third single from Life Is Peachy. The song peaked at number 25 on the UK Singles Chart.

Life Is Peachy opens with the approximately one-minute prelude "Twist", which is made up of improvised guttural scat singing and contains the word "twist" as the sole lyric, performed by Davis. Small described the vocal style as "spitting out the twisted rantings of a madman" and said that it was fit for the album's introduction. Revolver wrote that the album opens with a "surreal vocal freakout", while Kerrang! felt it features "nonsensical vocal noises". Kerrang! wrote that "Twist" conveys the underlying message that the opener of the "much-anticipated" second album won't be a single but rather a "great big 'Fuck you'". An a cappella version of "Twist" is included as a hidden track after "Kill You". "Chi" is named after former Deftones bassist Chi Cheng. It was named after Cheng because he liked reggae music and thought "Chi" was actually a reggae song. Davis said "Chi" is "about a lot of alcohol and drug abuse". He stated that his vocal style on "Twist" and "Chi" and the latter's lyrics remain "a mystery" to him. The meaning of "Lost" is the loss of his best friend when the latter settled down with his girlfriend. "Swallow" is about drug-induced paranoia. The instrumental "Porno Creep" was noted for its jazz-funk style, with Silveria's "deft, jazzy touches behind the drums kit" described by Kerrang! as "setting the band apart from any other group on the metal scene". Davis explained the background behind "Good God":

It's about a guy I knew in school who I thought was my friend, but who fucked me. He came into my life with nothing, hung out at my house, lived off me, and made me do shit I didn't really wanna do. I was into new romantic music and he was a mod, and he'd tell me if I didn't dress like a mod he wouldn't be my friend anymore. Whenever I had plans to go on a date with a chick he'd sabotage it, because he didn't have a date or nothing. He was a gutless fucking nothing. I haven't talked to him for years.

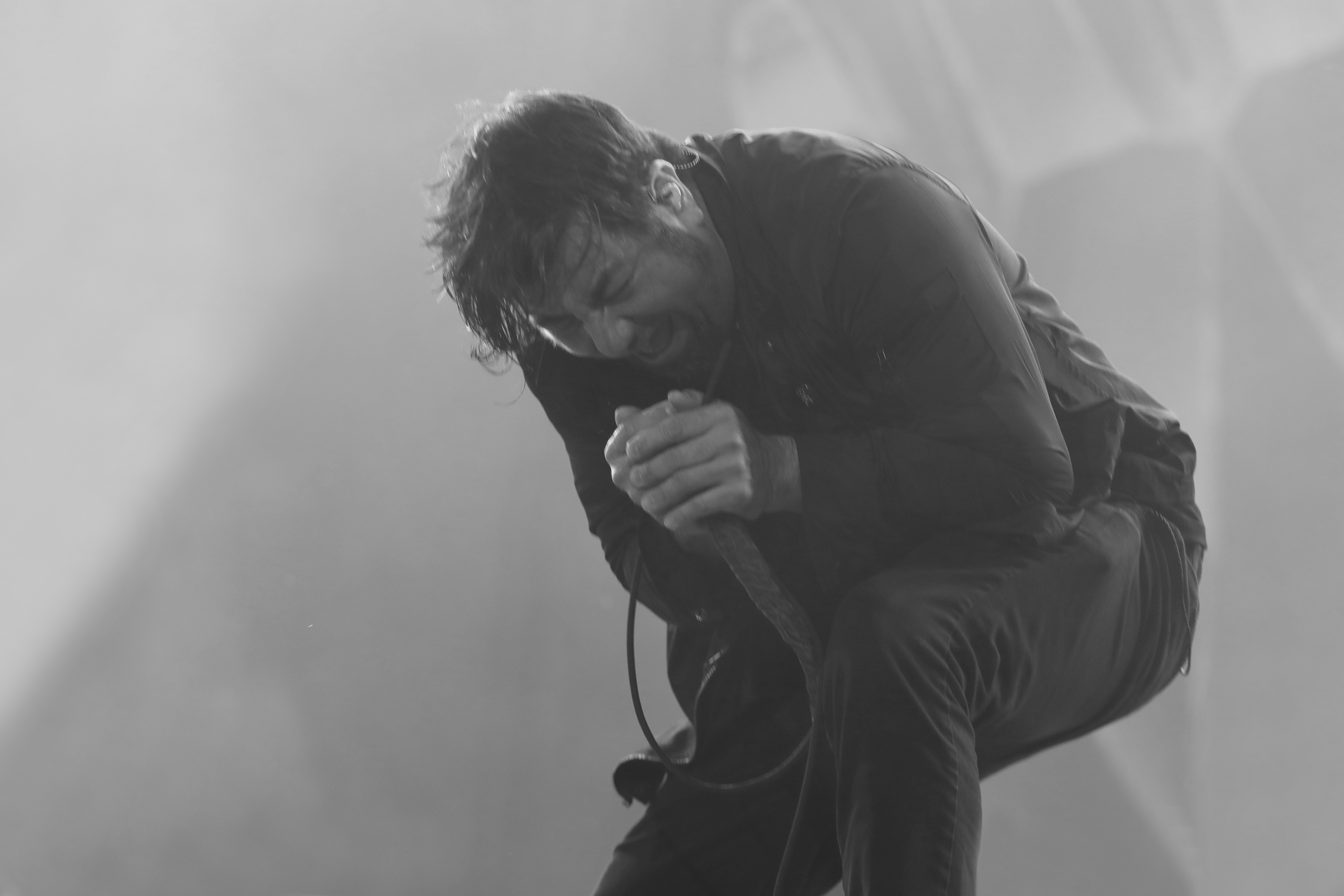
The tenth song, a cover of Ice Cube's "Wicked", features Deftones frontman Chino Moreno on vocals.

"Mr. Rogers" is about Fred Rogers. Davis said: "As a kid, he told me to be polite, and all it did was get me picked on. I fucking hate that man. Thanks for making me polite and trusting everyone, and easy to take advantage of." "K@#Ø%!" is about women who have hurt Davis. The song is noted for its heavy use of vulgarisms throughout all the lyrics; because of this, Shaffer said that the band had intended to jokingly submit it to rock radio stations because they "knew they wouldn't play it, then follow up about a week later with the real thing". The grawlix "K@#Ø%!" stands for "Kunts!". The lyrical theme of "No Place to Hide" is the impossibility of escaping from oneself, facing the same problems and obsessions in everyday life and beyond, year after year. "A.D.I.D.A.S." is an acronym for "All Day I Dream About Sex". "A.D.I.D.A.S." is also about sexual frustration and refers to the parties where a boy chases a girl but returns home alone; Davis added, " ... and you lie in bed and all you have to do is jerk off". The cover song "Lowrider" is characterized by Davis playing his bagpipes and the band's style of humor. "Ass Itch" is about Davis' difficulty with songwriting. "Kill You" is about Davis' ex-stepmother. It narrates a complicated relationship Davis had with her, who did not fully accept her stepson and his resentment of this relationship. Davis explained:

It's about a relative I first met when I was 12. I fucking hate that bitch. She's the most evil, fucked up person I've met in my whole life. She hated my guts. She did everything she could to make my life hell. Like, when I was sick she'd feed me tea with tabasco, which is really hot pepper oil. She'd make me drink it and say, 'You have to burn that cold out, boy'. Fucked up shit like that. So every night when I'd go to sleep, I'd dream of killing that bitch. In some sick way I had a sexual fantasy about her, and I don't know what that stems from or why, but I always dreamt about fucking her and killing her.

If their self-titled debut album represented the anger and confusion of adolescence, Life Is Peachy was the growing pains of becoming an adult. Korn' sophomore effort was an interesting response to the visceral intensity of their first album. It increased the hip hop influence in their sound in a sporadic way that would eventually become more focused on Follow the Leader.

— Colette Claire of Consequence

According to Davis, while the debut album centered on his childhood themes, Life Is Peachy reflected more on his past eighteen months within the band, except for a few songs. In 1996, Kerrang! summarized Life Is Peachy's themes: "Hate, pain, hate, sex, hate." They later stated that Korn channeled an "atmosphere of pure dementia" into the record, which showcased "more tales of child abuse, insecurity, betrayal of trust and general hatred for the world". The album's overall tone has been described by terms such as "big ball of anger", "contained rage", and "frustration". It instills a feeling of belligerence.

Life Is Peachy features a more prominent hip-hop influence than the band's self-titled debut, with Shaffer recalling, "We were listening to a lot of hip hop! I was probably listening to a lot of Mr. Bungle, hip hop like early Outkast and the Pharcyde, Sepultura records, and Rage Against the Machine, just to name a few." Characteristics that define the album's sound include the elements that appeared on the debut album, such as Arvizu's "clanking bass sound" and Welch and Shaffer's dissonant 7-string guitars, which are more disharmonic and noisy than previously, such as the loops on "Swallow", contrasting with Davis who had added more vocal melodies as exemplified on "No Place to Hide". The "clicky" and percussive bass sound can often be mistaken for the kick drum, for example, on "Ass Itch". Arvizu proudly described Life Is Peachy as having a rhythmically aggressive style, while MTV's Kyle Anderson expressed a converging opinion, saying the album "really belongs" to the bassist. The rhythms and "howling" vocals have been compared to those of the black metal subgenre. On the album, Davis' vocal style varies from whispering to clean singing, harsh vocals, and guttural scatting. His voice shifts going from one extreme to the other have been described as the "products of a beautiful voice". Screamings and sounds comparable to "borborygms" and onomatopoeias spontaneously punctuate his vocal parts. The vocal style on "Twist" was also described as a "cacophony of borborygms" or "borborygms delivered in a scat-like manner". Author and music journalist Jean-Charles Desgroux wrote that Davis displayed all his "organic versatility" on Life Is Peachy and achieved "heights of rage that are difficult to bear".

In the context of Life Is Peachy's promotional period, magazines and newspapers had vaguely defined the album's genre, although all had converged on the description of a metal sound. In early October 1996, announcing its imminent release, Kerrang! deemed "Good God" as "brutal" and wrote that they "sound like nothing that's gone before". On October 25, 1996, Entertainment Weekly's David Grad described the album's sound as a "fusion of heavy riffs and tight hip-hop beats". In October 1996, writer Manuel Rabasse commented that with Life Is Peachy, Korn "continues to depave the marked pathways of current metal". On November 5, 1996, The New York Times critic Jon Pareles wrote that throughout Life Is Peachy, "the band applies hip-hop's noise esthetics to a hard-rock lineup". In January 1997, Rock Sound's Katia Kulawick called Korn the "metal's mutants". In an interview during the Life Is Peachy Tour in March 1997, France's heavy metal magazine Hard Force described Korn as the "most revered new generation's metal band of this time". In May 1997, Greg Kot of the Chicago Tribune called Korn a "testosterone-juiced metal act". Life Is Peachy was a "moment" that represented the apogee of a new musical style (later branded "nu metal") which "sounded fresh and interesting and vital". Life Is Peachy was subsequently labeled nu metal. (Note: In a 2002 retrospective article, Q magazine's Dan Silver wrote that the Family Values Tour in the second half of 1998 was a "catalyst for the nascent nu-metal scene". In 1999, Simon Reynolds of Spin called Korn's music "nu metal".)

== Album art and booklet ==
Card in Life Is Peachy

Arvizu came up with the title Life Is Peachy. The name came from Arvizu's Pee Chee folder. He often wrote the words "Life Is" in front of the brand name, which he found amusing. Arvizu said, "I used to doodle all over it [the file folder]. I drew long hair on the character and put guitars in their hands. I used to sketch stuff all the time. I eventually knew my scribbles might someday pay off. I thought that visual would make a really cool album cover." Korn contacted the Pee Chee file folder company and asked for permission to use the file folder's image for an album cover, offering twenty thousand dollars ($20,000), resulting in the company turning the offer down. The name Life Is Peachy was agreed by band members to be a "great" name for the album, and kept the name but didn't add Fieldy's file folder cover. Due to the album's dark lyrical content, its title would be interpreted as ironic.

The booklet, much like the booklets to all Korn albums, does not disclose any of the songs' lyrics. Korn members have explained that the reason behind omitting the lyrics is due to the belief that including printed lyrics limits the listener's musical experience. Davis told MTV's Serena Altschul, "I think music is something that every individual has their own meaning to the song. They can come up with whatever the hell I'm saying and that's the beauty of it and that's what I wanna keep there."

Life Is Peachy's black and white front cover depicts a little boy with neatly combed blond hair straightening his tie in a gilt mirror while a taller, shadowy presence looms behind him. The photo was taken by Martin Riedl. The design and concept were by Scott Leberecht. Small said that it "continued the threatened child theme as depicted on Korn's artwork." Other photos in the booklet were taken by Stephen Stickler. Life Is Peachy is, to date, the only album by Korn to feature their name spelled in a different font. Two quotations are printed on the inside face of the card under the CD tray. The first is taken from Homer Joy's "Streets of Bakersfield" (1973) and reads as follows: "You don't know me but you don't like me, You say you care less how I feel. How many of you that sit and judge me. Ever walked the streets of Bakersfield?" The second quotation reads: "'Who Then now, Bitches?'—Korn", which would later be the title of their biographical video.

== Release and promotion ==
Korn resumed intensive touring immediately after recording sessions for Life Is Peachy ended, performing notably at the UK Monsters of Rock festival in Donington on August 17, 1996, where they headlined the second stage and played songs from the upcoming album. At the festival, the band was interviewed by MTV's Vanessa Warwick for Headbangers Ball. Korn performed at several European festivals as a pre-Life Is Peachy Tour. The band had only cost the Swiss Rock Oz'Arènes festival $3,000 to get them to perform in mid-1996. In September 1996, Korn was selling 6,000 copies per week; "It was a completely grass-roots campaign", said Epic Records' Al Masocco. However, Davis stressed his desire for Korn to stay underground. Korn was selling well due to word of mouth and extended touring, earning them a "loyal" fanbase.

Just days before the release of Life Is Peachy, NME wrote that the "rise of Korn over the past two years has been nothing short of meteoric". A preview of the album was presented on Sony's website to fans worldwide, which became overloaded with traffic and crashed.

Life Is Peachy was released worldwide on October 15, 1996. It was released by Immortal Records, a label distributed by Sony's Epic. The CD album version includes a bonus multimedia section that features live video footage of "Good God" recorded at London Astoria in the summer of 1996.

=== Life Is Peachy Tour ===
The band toured throughout the US from October 1996 onward, with Limp Bizkit as the opening act. Korn supported Metallica on their US tour, which began in mid-December 1996.

Life Is Peachy Tour Sampler

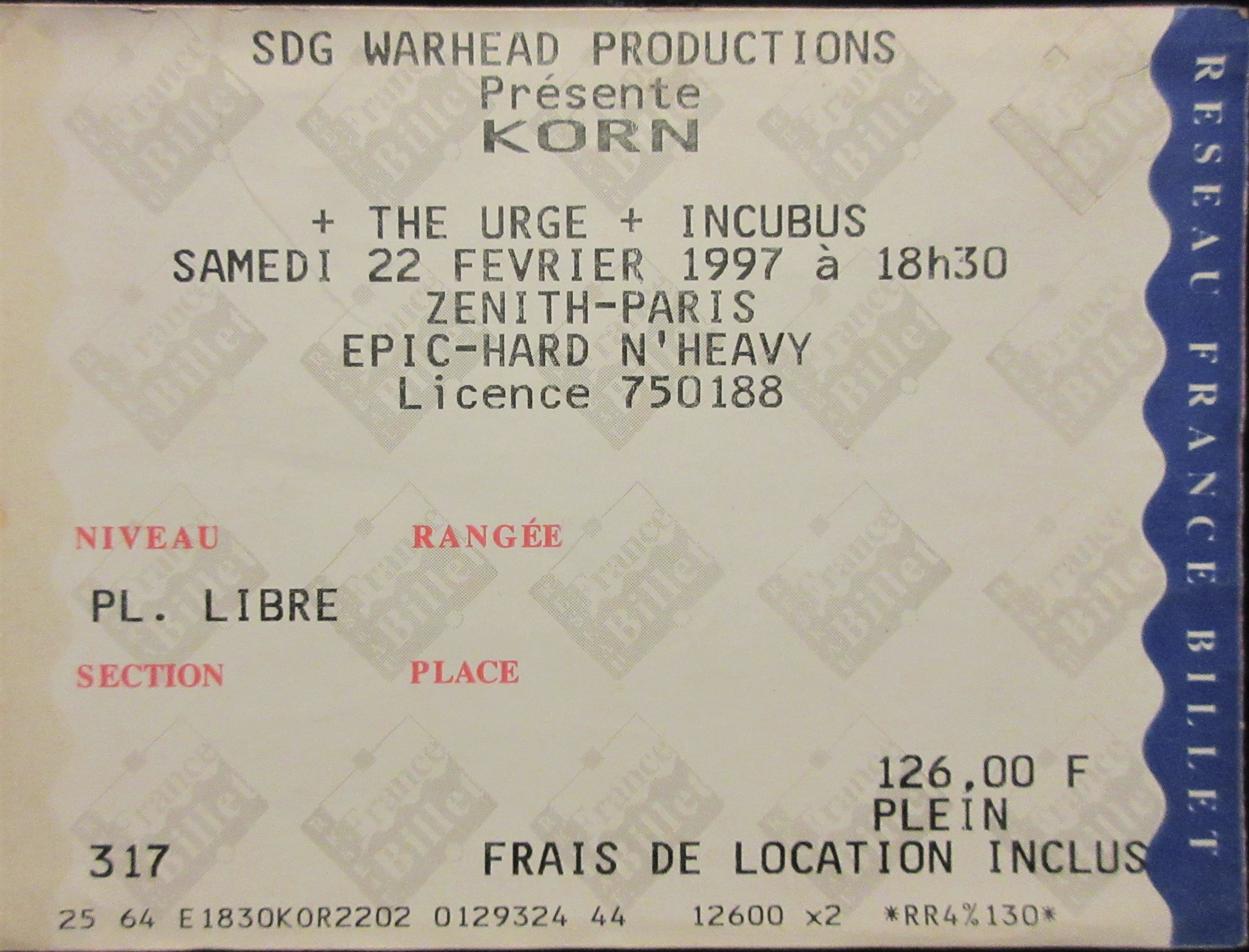
Original ticket for the concert at
Le Zénith in Paris, February 1997

According to Shaffer, the tour with Metallica ended in mid-January 1997. Korn toured solo in 1997 and headlined at often sold-out shows. The band released a promotional disc in 1997 called Life Is Peachy Tour Sampler, with Incubus and the Urge, as both bands supported Korn on their UK and European headlining tour. The album featured three live tracks: "Chi" by Korn (US Tour Fall 1996), "All Washed Up" by the Urge, and "Hilikus" by Incubus. The tour encompassed twenty-six shows and began on January 21, 1997, in Germany, visiting Denmark, France, Italy, the Netherlands, Norway, Spain, and Sweden, and ended in London on February 24. On February 20, 1997, Korn made a television appearance as the musical guest of the day on Nulle Part Ailleurs (NPA), performing "No Place to Hide" (live broadcast) in prime time on Canal+ in Paris.

Helmet and Limp Bizkit also toured with them to promote Life Is Peachy; both bands were the opening acts for Korn's North American tour. After ten days of rest, Korn kicked off their North American headlining tour on March 6 in Arizona, performing to "a packed" Mesa Amphitheater, and ended on March 27 in Maine, with a total of sixteen shows. It included performances in Chicago, Kansas City, Pensacola, Tampa, and Toronto, among other cities. They then went on their first Australian tour in May 1997. While in Sydney, Australia, they guest programmed the music video show Rage, playing videos from Ice Cube, Faith No More, Filter, Red Hot Chili Peppers, Cypress Hill, The D.O.C., Beastie Boys and Tokyo Ghetto Pussy. Later in May 1997, the band returned for a short second leg of the UK and Europe headline tour, including a few dates in France; Limp Bizkit and Helmet were the opening acts. They have also performed at European festivals, including the Dynamo Open Air in Eindhoven. Korn became a "must-see" band through the Life Is Peachy Tour and garnered media attention in the UK and Europe.

Korn was a co-headliner on the main stage at the Lollapalooza summer tour 7, along with Jane's Addiction, the Prodigy, Snoop Dogg, Tool, and Tricky, among others, which began on June 25, 1997. The band secured the Lollapalooza slot at the beginning of the year. During the prior year's Lollapalooza, there was controversy over the inclusion of marquee, big-name artists such as Metallica and Soundgarden, which founder Perry Farrell considered a "bastardization" of Lollapalooza, leading him to walk out on the tour. Davis said, "Last year... wasn't like a real Lollapalooza vibe. ... Because it seems to me that Lollapalooza's been about cutting-edge bands, ones on the underground, and that's what I think [Perry Farrell] based that whole thing on and last year really just wasn't all about that. And this year, now that he's back on, you can tell, there's so many different, diverse music groups here." Korn's popularity in the US increased significantly during the Lollapalooza tour, where they developed a growing fan base. The constant touring, "word-on-the-street", and the Internet have earned the band an ascending global reputation. Korn's website received around 50,000 hits per day.

On July 18, not even a month into the tour, Korn was forced to cancel the remainder of their Lollapalooza appearances due to Shaffer's recent diagnosis with viral meningitis. Davis released a written statement concerning Shaffer's illness: "We love our fans. This is the last thing we want to do, but it's the only decision to make at this time. It just doesn't feel right without [Shaffer]." The statement also acknowledged fans that "there is no suitable replacement for [Shaffer] during his recuperation." July 18, 1997, at Cleveland's Blossom Music Center as part of the Lollapalooza marked the final show of the Life Is Peachy Tour. Korn would envision reuniting after Shaffer's recovery to begin writing the third album. By then, fan rumors circulated on the Internet about Shaffer's supposed death.

==== Concert synopsis ====
Writers Katia Kulawick of Rock Sound and Manuel Rabasse of Hard 'N' Heavy magazine reviewed a Life Is Peachy Tour's show at Seattle's Mercer Arena on November 30, 1996. Before the show, Kulawick asked Korn about their "mental state"; Shaffer responded, "Aggressive. And there, right away, exhausted." The Life Is Peachy Tour featured live performances of Davis wearing customized sequined Adidas tracksuits. The show started with a video projected on a screen onstage, which was a nonsensical animated cartoon with "grimacing characters", then Davis, dressed in a purple sequined tracksuit, "belched out" "Twist" under a dim spotlight, the opening song, followed by "Blind" from the 1994 debut album with the whole stage lighting. Rabasse praised the performance of Korn, describing it as "Powerful, of rare cohesion, of infallible precision." Kulawick wrote that the animated cartoon, supplemented by dismembered dolls scattered behind and hung on two large grids above the band members, gave a "tragic dimension". Davis' sequined tracksuit contrasted strikingly with the stage setting and Life Is Peachy's music and lyrics.

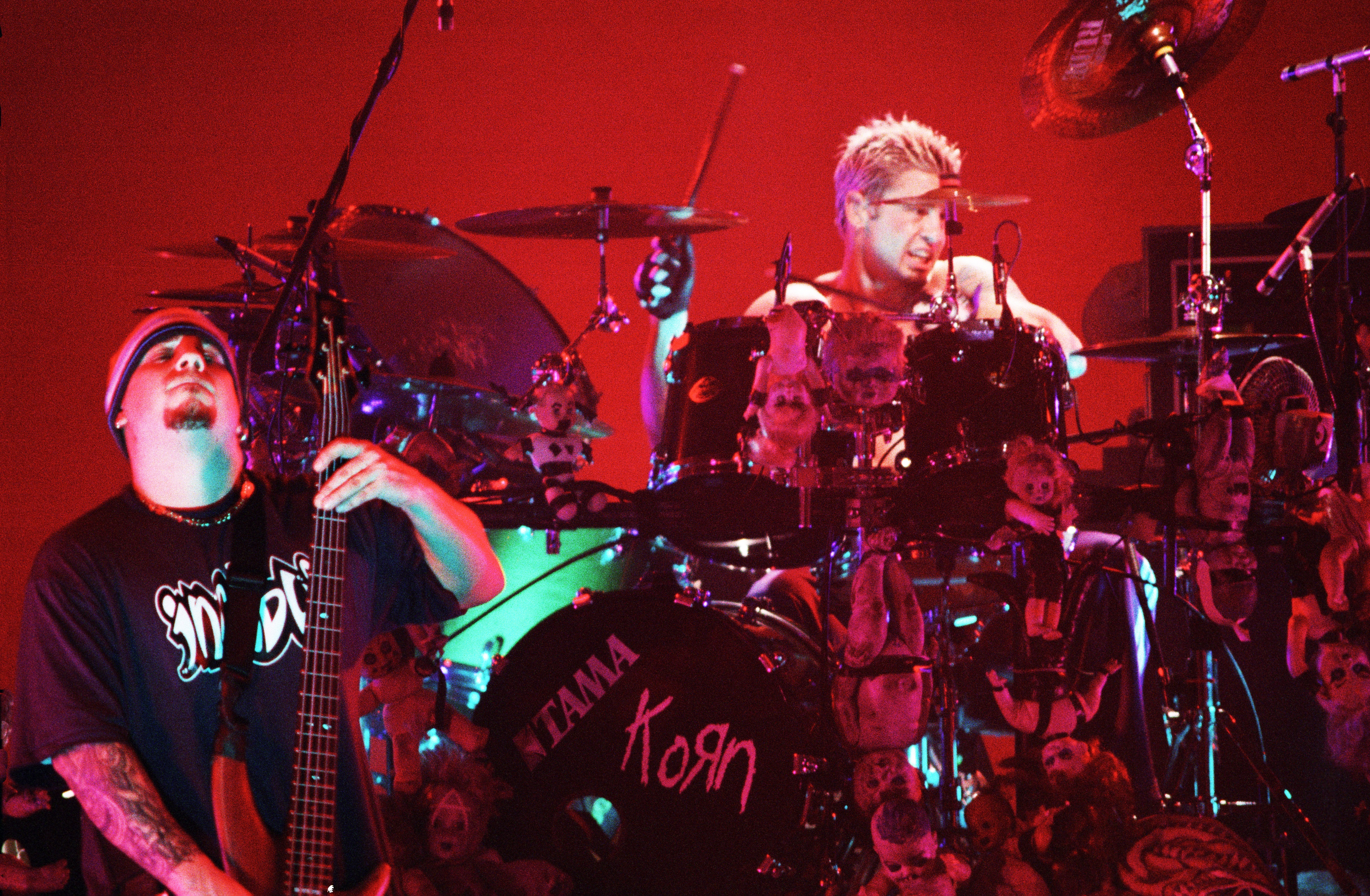
Arvizu (left) and Silveria (right) during the 1997 Life Is Peachy Tour

The onstage lighting configuration consisted of vertical spotlights in pink, red, and purple colors, illuminating the musicians above and below. The show also featured green-colored spotlights, most commonly used in death metal shows at that time, and strobe lights of fast flashing frequencies. The "ominous" shadows of the musicians were sometimes displayed on the screen, which only had that type of function during the show. The pit was mostly made up of fans wearing "oversized and misshapen" clothes and pants and often having the same hairstyle as Welch. The sound system in the venue amplifying Davis' voice was "questionable", but it improved on "Good God". Throughout the show, Davis was constantly "hanging on to his mic stand", gesticulating over the heavy rhythms propelled by Arvizu's percussive bass sound paired with the TR-8080's sound integrated into Silveria's drum kit. The dominant instrument was the bass, and the live sound was described as "a mini-earthquake" at each Silveria's kick drum hit. Of the guitar playing, Rabasse wrote, "Dirtiness, approximation, confusion are inherent elements of the sound" of Shaffer and Welch, "at the head of a panoply of pedals, all more tinkered the ones than the others". Rabasse described the show's final songs as "a voodoo trance mixed with psychotherapy" and called it "apocalyptic". Some other songs from Life Is Peachy played that night were "A.D.I.D.A.S.", "Lowrider", "No Place to Hide", and "Kill You". Kulawick described the Korn performance that night as "extremely grueling" and the crowd as "hysterical". The show lasted just over an hour; without an encore.

Korn's 1996 and 1997 headlining shows lasted 70 to 75 minutes. The show in Glasgow at Barrowland Ballroom on January 24, 1997, included "Proud" in the 15-song setlist and had no encore. Korn's stage presence earned them critical acclaim from Clare Dowse of Kerrang!, who rated the show 5 out of 5. During the 1997 tour, Limp Bizkit's Fred Durst began to appear as a guest vocalist on "Wicked" and did the rapped vocals segments of the song, taking the role of Deftones' Chino Moreno. Toward the end of the 1997 tour, they regularly merged the end of "No Place to Hide" with an extract of Deftones' "Engine No. 9".

=== Singles ===
Three singles were released from Life Is Peachy. The album's first single, "No Place to Hide", was issued to heavy metal radio stations in mid-September 1996 and subsequently to alternative radio, and its physical release followed on October 7. The single features "Sean Olson" and "Proud", two songs that would be included on the soundtracks for The Crow: City of Angels (1996) and I Know What You Did Last Summer (1997), respectively. Other releases include the original album song and remixed versions of 1994's "Shoots and Ladders" by producers the Dust Brothers. "A.D.I.D.A.S." was released as a single in early 1997. "Good God" was the album's third and final single. Various CD single versions include both original and remixed versions of "Good God" as well as remixes of "A.D.I.D.A.S." and "Wicked".

=== Music videos ===
Korn did not make a music video for "No Place to Hide", as Davis said it was a "waste of time and money" and mentioned the band's "integrity". They chose instead to include a live video of "Good God" on the enhanced CD. The music video for "A.D.I.D.A.S." was directed by Joseph Kahn in Los Angeles in January 1997. Arvizu recalled: "It was one of the hardest videos we ever made because we all had to lie still on cold metal slabs for hours, pretending to be dead. We wore dirty blue contacts in our eyes that made us partially blind while they were in." It received a nomination at the 1997 Billboard Music Video Awards in the hard rock category.

== Critical reception ==
=== Contemporary ===
Contemporary ratings
Review scores
Source	Rating
AllMusic	3/5 stars
Chronicles of Chaos	8/10
Entertainment Weekly	C−
Kerrang!	4/5 stars
Metal Hammer	4/5 stars
The New York Times	(favorable)
Rock Hard	4/10
Vox	3/10
Wall of Sound	71/100

Life Is Peachy received mainly mixed reviews from critics. Stephen Thomas Erlewine of AllMusic wrote: "Korn add enough elements of alternative rock song structure to make the music accessible to the masses, and their songwriting has continued to improve." Mörat of Kerrang! rated the album four out of five stars. He wrote that Davis' vocals are "filled with rage and hatred and bile", and he opined that what "makes the band" is the "bare emotion" in his voice. He highlighted the darkness and heaviness of the music, which occasionally showcased a "weird funky vibe". Dominic Hilton of Guitarist wrote, "Life Is Peachy shows no let-up in the psychotic style, and is safely tipped to establish Korn as the new standard" in metal. Hard Force magazine rated the album 3 out of 5. They wrote that although Korn retains its trademark elements showcased in the 1994 debut album, the band "radicalizes its discourse" on Life Is Peachy, making it harder to pin down.

Adrian Bromley of Chronicles of Chaos wrote that he was "impressed with the strength and sound quality" Korn "has been able to magnify with Life Is Peachy". Los Angeles Times critic Mike Boehm called the album a "gloomy hard-rock record". Ian Winwood of Metal Hammer found the album "so noisy and heavy that it is impossible to pose to" and stated, "Korn sound like nothing that has preceded them". He concluded his review with: "Classic". Jon Pareles of The New York Times wrote: "Korn has learned more than a few tricks from Nine Inch Nails, and it's not above using invective for simple shock value. But the chip on its shoulder sounds genuine." Entertainment Weekly said the album was a "primal scream" and left the "impression that frontman Jonathan Davis is turning his well-publicized childhood traumas into a cheap marketing device". They gave it a C− and said that it "may be of interest to mental-health professionals." Stephen Thompson of the A.V. Club panned Life Is Peachy, calling the album "nothing but plain old, ham-fisted, butt-stupid heavy metal". Lucky Clark of the Sun Journal wrote that he "experienced the full-throttle cacophony of rage and musical mayhem" captured in the album.

=== Retrospective ===
Retrospective ratings
Review scores
Source	Rating
Christgau's Consumer Guide	(dud)
Collector's Guide to Heavy Metal	9/10
The Encyclopedia of Popular Music	3/5 stars
The Great Rock Discography	8/10
Kerrang!	3/5 stars
Metal Storm	8.5/10
MusicHound Rock	2.5/5 stars
Q	3/5 stars
The Rolling Stone Album Guide	2/5 stars

In a 2002 critical reappraisal, Ashley Bird of Kerrang! wrote that Life Is Peachy was a "difficult, angular, sinister record". He wrote that many have divergent opinions of the album; for some, it was "disjointed", and for others, it was regarded as "the finest hour" of the band. Elaborating further, he stated: "In Faith No More terms, this was Angel Dust, in Nirvana terms it was In Utero. In anyone's terms, it's one hell of a ride". Praising Davis' vocal performance on "Good God", Bird said its powerful chorus would be a pivotal moment on the album, thus becoming an important influence for "legions of down-tuned wannabes" who "ripped off" this singing style. But, he added, "never has a metal mantra been delivered with more tortured passion" than Davis. Bird regarded "Good God" as the "pinnacle" of Life Is Peachy. He dismissed "K@#Ø%!", which he included in "a couple of slips", although that was not enough to impair "an album of such diverse charms". Q magazine's Danny Scott said the album is "Harsher and harder than their groundbreaking debut."

The Greenwood Encyclopedia of Rock History author Bob Gulla described Davis as a "virulent singer" on the album. Gulla gave a laudatory assessment, writing that he "seethed his way through the recording in helping to define himself as one of the most compelling and troubled voices in all of rock", and praised the creative partnership, stating that "the manic guitars and rhythm surrounding him only enhanced the final product". Anderson stated the album was a sort of "de-evolution" for the band due to its abrasive production that contrasted with the 1994 debut album. "Much of Life Is Peachy is ugly", he said, whereas a notion of "playfulness" was showcased on the 1998 follow-up album. He further stated that Life Is Peachy was "pure Korn id—nothing but anger and violence". Anderson wrote, '[t]hat's not to say it's a bad album", but that it was actually "one of the more fascinating (if inconsistent) entries in the nu metal canon". In a 2021 retrospective review, Metal Hammer noted that Life Is Peachy was "occasionally wacky" but also "far more" experimental than the debut album, further stating that songs such as "Chi", "Mr. Rogers", "No Place to Hide", and "Wicked" are "moments of genuine brilliance", and added, "But they're all topped by the savage 'Good God', which can lay a claim to being the best song Korn have ever written." The magazine felt that the triviality of "Porno Creep", "K@#Ø%!", and "Lowrider", tended to downgrade the album.

=== Accolades ===
==== Kerrang ====
Year	Award	Category	Result	Ref.
1997	Kerrang! Awards	Best Album	Won	

==== Grammy Awards ====
Year	Award	Category	Song	Result	Ref.
1998	Grammy Award	Best Metal Performance	No Place to Hide	Nominated	

== Commercial performance ==
Life Is Peachy peaked at number one on the New Zealand Top 40 Album chart. The album debuted and peaked at number three on the Billboard 200 chart. It sold 106,000 copies in the US in its opening week, marking the band's first significant breakthrough. The album also peaked at number 32 on the UK Albums Chart. Life Is Peachy was certified gold by the Recording Industry Association of America (RIAA) on January 8, 1997. On December 9, 1997, the album was certified platinum by the RIAA. It was certified double platinum by the RIAA on November 10, 1999. By 2009, the album had sold almost three million copies worldwide.

"No Place to Hide" peaked at number 26 on the UK Singles Chart. The album's second single, "A.D.I.D.A.S.", peaked at number 22 on the same chart, while also making an appearance at number 45 in Australia. In April 1997, "A.D.I.D.A.S." went to number 13 on the Bubbling Under Hot 100 Singles chart. "Good God" peaked at number 25 on the UK Singles Chart and number 81 on the Australian ARIA Charts.

== Legacy ==
Korn is regarded as "the one band that jumpstarted the nü-metal trend", Life Is Peachy thus picking up where Korn left off with their self-titled debut album. Life Is Peachy was considered "innovative" by authors and music journalists Malcolm Dome and Mick Wall. In 2000, Life Is Peachy was voted number 869 in Colin Larkin's All Time Top 1000 Albums. The album was selected by Rolling Stone staff for their list of "20 Rock Albums Turning 20 in 2016". In 2021, Alternative Press included Life Is Peachy in its list of the "20 Albums from 1996 that mark some of the best of the decade". In 2021, Metal Hammer included the album in its list of the "Top 20 best metal albums of 1996" (in alphabetical order). In 2022, Life Is Peachy was ranked number 13 on Metal Hammer's list of the "50 best nu metal albums of all time" and was on MetalSucks' list of "14 Metal Albums That Epitomize the Sound of the '90s." In 2022, Jon Wiederhorn of Loudwire wrote that Life Is Peachy "is considered by many to be one of Korn's best records".

Korn had challenged norms and altered preconceptions of what metal had to be by regularly sporting Adidas Originals' apparel, a close connection with the brand typified by the song "A.D.I.D.A.S." and its music video featuring Davis dressed in his purple-sequined three-stripe tracksuit. Sam Law of Kerrang! wrote: "Fashion that was unlike anything seen in the world of metal before. This wasn't just about music ... but about what being 'alternative' actually meant", adding that "Korn's 1997 classic 'A.D.I.D.A.S.' is the pinnacle of the scene." The inaugural Korn x Adidas Originals Collection inspired by Life Is Peachy was launched on October 27, 2023.

== Track listing ==
All tracks are written by Korn, unless otherwise noted.

No.	Title	Writer(s)	Length
1.	"Twist"		0:49
2.	"Chi"		3:54
3.	"Lost"		2:55
4.	"Swallow"		3:38
5.	"Porno Creep"		2:01
6.	"Good God"		3:20
7.	"Mr. Rogers"		5:10
8.	"Kunts!" ( (Note: "Kunts!" is censored on most releases as "K@#*%!", also written as "K@#Ø%!" on the cover of the disc.))		3:02
9.	"No Place to Hide"		3:31
10.	"Wicked" (featuring Chino Moreno of Deftones; Ice Cube cover)	O'Shea Jackson	3:58
11.	"A.D.I.D.A.S."		2:32
12.	"Lowrider" (War cover)	Sylvester Allen, Harold Brown, Morris "B.B." Dickerson, Leroy Jordan, Charles Miller, Lee Oskar, Howard Scott; Jerry Goldstein	0:58
13.	"Ass Itch"		3:39
14.	"Kill You" (includes hidden track (Note: The song "Kill You" ends at 5:04. After two minutes and 30 seconds of silence [5:04 – 7:34] a brief hidden track reprisal of "Twist" in a cappella form called "Twist A Capella", starts.))		8:37
Total length:			48:14

US & Canada enhanced edition
No.	Title	Length
15.	"Good God" (live video)	3:18

Tour edition
No.	Title	Music	Album	Length
1.	"Chi" (live)	Korn	Life Is Peachy	4:31
2.	"All Washed Up" (live)	The Urge	Receiving the Gift of Flavor	4:31
3.	"Hilikus" (live)	Incubus	Fungus Amongus	3:55
Total length:				12:17

US 1998 reissue enhanced edition
No.	Title	Length
15.	"A.D.I.D.A.S." (music video)	3:18

== Personnel ==
Credits taken from the CD liner notes.

=== Korn ===
- Jonathan Davis – lead vocals, bagpipes, additional guitars on "Kill You" and "Mr. Rogers"
- Head – guitars, vocals on "Lowrider"
- Munky – guitars
- Fieldy – bass guitar
- David Silveria – drums

=== Additional musicians ===
- Chino Moreno – vocals on "Wicked"
- Nathan Davis – additional vocals on "A.D.I.D.A.S."
- Sugar and Earl – additional guest appearance on "Swallow"
- Chuck Johnson – cowbell in "Lowrider"

=== Technical ===
- Ross Robinson – producer, engineer, mixing
- Chuck Johnson – engineer, mixing
- Richard Kaplan – mixing, additional engineering
- Rob Agnello – assistant
- Jamie Leavitt – assistant
- Eddy Schreyer – mastering

== Charts ==
=== Weekly charts ===
Chart (1996–1997)	Peak position
Australian Albums (ARIA)	26
Austrian Albums (Ö3 Austria)	21
Belgian Albums (Ultratop Flanders)	36
Belgian Albums (Ultratop Wallonia)	25
Canada Top Albums/CDs (RPM)	32
Dutch Albums (Album Top 100)	87
Europe (European Top 100 Albums)	38
Finnish Albums (Suomen virallinen lista)	24
German Albums (Offizielle Top 100)	85
New Zealand Albums (RMNZ)	1
Norwegian Albums (VG-lista)	24
Scottish Albums (Official Charts)	38
Swedish Albums (Sverigetopplistan)	36
UK Albums (Official Charts)	32
US Billboard 200	3

=== Year-end charts ===
Chart (1997)	Position
US Billboard 200	132
Chart (1999)	Position
Australian Albums (ARIA)	64

== Certifications ==
Region	Certification	Certified units/sales
Australia (ARIA)	Platinum	70,000^{^}
Canada (Music Canada)	Gold	50,000^{^}
New Zealand (RMNZ)	Gold	7,500^{^}
United Kingdom (BPI)	Gold	100,000^{*}
United States (RIAA)	2× Platinum	2,000,000^{^}
^{*} Sales figures based on certification alone.^{^} Shipments figures based on certification alone.

== Bibliography ==
- Arvizu, Reginald (2009). Got the Life: My Journey of Addiction, Faith, Recovery, and Korn. William Marrow. ISBN 978-0-06-166249-2.
- Furman, Leah (May 5, 2000). Korn: Life in the Pit. New York: St. Martin's Griffin. ISBN 0-312-25396-6.
- Gulla, Bob (2006). The Greenwood Encyclopedia of Rock History – The Grunge and Post-Grunge Years, 1991–2005. Vol. 6. Connecticut: Greenwood Press. ISBN 978-0-313-32981-4.
- Paquet, Sebastien (May 1, 2002). Korn de A à Z [Korn from A to Z]. MusicBook guides (in French) (1st ed.). Paris: Prélude et Fugue. ISBN 978-2-843-43101-2.
- Small, Doug (1998). The Story of Korn. Omnibus Press. ISBN 0-8256-1688-3.
