= Good God (Korn song) =

Single by Korn

from the album Life Is Peachy
- Released: 1997
- Recorded: 1996
- Studio: Indigo Ranch (Malibu, California)
- Genre: Nu metal
- Length: 3:23
- Label: Epic; Immortal
- Songwriters: Reginald Arvizu; Jonathan Davis; James Shaffer; David Silveria; Brian Welch
- Producer: Ross Robinson

Korn singles chronology
| "A.D.I.D.A.S." (1997) | "Good God" (1997) | "All in the Family" (1998) |

"Good God" is a song by American nu metal band Korn. It was released as the third and last single from their second studio album, Life Is Peachy (1996).

In 2022, Eli Enis of Revolver included the song in his list of the "10 Heaviest Nu-Metal Songs of All Time".

== Concept ==
Jonathan Davis explained, sometime before 2002: "It's about a guy I knew in school who I thought was my friend, but who fucked me. He came into my life with nothing, hung out at my house, lived off me, and made me do shit I didn't really wanna do. I was into new romantic music and he was a mod, and he'd tell me if I didn't dress like a mod he wouldn't be my friend anymore. Whenever I had plans to go on a date with a chick he'd sabotage it, because he didn't have a date or nothing. He was a gutless fucking nothing. I haven't talked to him for years."

== Music video ==
An official live video, recorded at the London Astoria, is included on the enhanced version of Life Is Peachy.

== Track listing ==
=== Australian release ===
- CD5" (664387 2)
1. "Good God" (Clean Version) – 3:35
2. "Need To" (live) – 3:54
3. "Good God" (Album Version) – 3:23
4. "Good God" (Heartfloor Remix) by Rammstein – 3:33
5. "Divine" (live) – 4:37
6. "Good God" (Such A Surge Remix) – 4:05

=== UK (Sony BMG) ===
- CD (2165)
1. "Good God" (Clean) – 3:30

=== UK maxi-single release #1 ===
- CD5" (664658 2)
1. "Good God" (Album Version) – 3:20
2. "Good God" (Mekon Mix) – 5:32
3. "Good God" (Dub Pistols Mix) – 6:18
4. "Wicked" (Tear the Roof Off Mix) – 3:45
5. "Good God" (live video) – 3:40

=== US maxi-single Release ===
- CD (41417)
1. "Good God" (Heartfloor Remix) – 3:33
2. "Good God" (OOMPH! vs. Such A Surge Mix) – 4:09

=== UK maxi-single release #2 ===
- CD5" (664658 5)
1. "Good God" (Album Version) – 3:20
2. "A.D.I.D.A.S." (Synchro Mix) – 4:29
3. "A.D.I.D.A.S." (Under Pressure Mix) – 3:55
4. "A.D.I.D.A.S." (The Wet Dream Mix) – 3:35

=== Japanese and German release #2 ===
- CD5" (664387 5)
1. "Good God" – 3:23
2. "Good God" (Heartfloor Remix) – 3:33
3. "Good God" (OOMPH! vs. Such A Surge Mix) – 4:09
4. "Good God" (Headknot Remix) – 7:12
5. "Good God" (Mekon Mix) – 5:33
6. "Good God" (Dub Pistols Mix) – 6:17

=== French remixes ===
- CD5" (664918)
1. "Good God" (Marc Em Remix) – 4:56
2. "Good God" (Oneyed Jack Remix Kronick Bass) – 5:19
3. "Good God" (Headknot Remix) – 7:12
4. "A.D.I.D.A.S." (Synchro Dub Mix) – 4:29
5. "Good God" – 3:23

== Personnel ==
Korn

- Jonathan Davis – vocals
- Fieldy – bass
- Munky – guitar
- Head – guitar
- David Silveria – drums

Production

- Ross Robinson – producer
- Chuck Johnson – engineer
- Chuck Johnson – mixing
- Richard Kaplan – mixing

== Charts ==
| Chart (1997) | Peak position |
|---|---|
| Australia (ARIA) | 81 |
| Scottish Singles Sales (Official Charts) | 23 |
| UK Singles (Official Charts) | 25 |
| UK Rock & Metal (Official Charts) | 2 |
