= Here to Stay (Korn song) =

Single by Korn

from the album Untouchables
- Released: 2002
- Genre: Nu metal; hard rock
- Length: 4:32
- Label: Epic
- Songwriters: Reginald Arvizu; Jonathan Davis; James Shaffer; David Silveria; Brian Welch
- Producer: Michael Beinhorn

Korn singles chronology
"Somebody Someone" (2000)	"Here to Stay" (2002)	"Thoughtless" (2002)

Music video
- "Here to Stay" on YouTube

"Here to Stay" is a song by American nu metal band Korn that appears on the band's fifth studio album, Untouchables as the album's opening track. It was released as the album's first single in June 2002. The song won the 2003 Grammy Award for Best Metal Performance, as well as winning an award for Best International Video on MuchMusic in 2002. It was also nominated for Best Rock Video at the 2002 MTV Video Music Awards and Best Single at the 2002 Kerrang! Awards. The music video, directed by The Hughes Brothers was highly successful, and gained frequent airplay on MTV and MuchMusic in particular, featuring the band members on a TV screen amongst major world issues at the time. The video won a 2002 Metal Edge Readers' Choice Award for Music Video of the Year. The song has become a staple of the band's live show to this day. Dizzee Rascal samples this song on his single, "Sirens" from his album, Maths + English.

== Release and reception ==
"Here to Stay" was released to US radio stations in February 2002 as a promotional single. The retail version was released on the same day as Untouchables, June 11, 2002. A box set was later released, which included all three editions of the "Here to Stay" single. There is also a one-track promotional single of the Mindless Self Indulgence remix, which is available on Korn's YouTube channel. This remix is also found on the DVD single of "Thoughtless".

Electronic musician BT also remixed the song that same year.

"Here to Stay" was Korn's first single to enter the Billboard Hot 100, peaking at #72. It is their highest-charting song in Australia, Ireland, and the UK. It has also been widely considered to be one of Korn's best songs. In 2019, Loudwire ranked the song number five on their list of the 50 greatest Korn songs, and in 2021, Kerrang ranked the song number three on their list of the 20 greatest Korn songs.

=== Accolades ===
Publication	Accolade	Rank
Billboard	Top 100 Greatest Rock Songs of the 2000s	97
Metal Hammer	100 Greatest Metal Songs of the 2000s	30

== Live performance ==
In the concert version of the song, small changes are made to the song, such as the guitar riff played by Head in the background being removed during the outro of the song. The line "fucked up feelings again" in the pre-chorus of the song is often left for the audience to sing instead of Davis while rest of the band members momentarily stop playing their instruments in order to hear the fans' voices more clearly.

== Track listing ==
CD single:

1. "Here to Stay" – 4:31

DVD single:

1. "Here to Stay" (Extended video)
2. "Here to Stay" (Short video)

EP:

1. "Here To Stay - T Ray's Mix"
2. "Here To Stay - T Ray's Mix Instrumental"
3. "Here To Stay - BT's Managed Anger Mix"
4. "Here To Stay - BT-Korn Instrumental"
5. "Here To Stay - Remixed By MINDLESS SELF INDULGENCE"
6. "Here To Stay - Tone Toven And Sleep Remix"

== Music video ==
The music video, directed by the Hughes Brothers, portrays a boy watching subliminal messages on TV while flipping channels between shows (which consist of real-world events) and the band playing in the TV against a static backdrop. In the end, Jonathan takes the boy into the TV. The video for "Here to Stay" also marks the first video appearance of Jonathan's unique microphone stand designed by H. R. Giger. There is also a "clean" version of the music video which shows the boy being taken into the TV at the beginning. This version omitted the explicit words and all of the real-event videos. The point of view is "inside" the TV instead of outside it. This version is the one shown at Sony BMG's official YouTube channel.

== Appearances in media ==
- The song is featured on the soundtrack to the 2002 video game ATV Offroad Fury 2.
- Featured in the adverts of the Spanish TV channel Cuatro, during the UEFA Euro 2008. In the adverts, Spain striker Fernando Torres and goalkeeper Iker Casillas are shown fighting with robots to win the ball. A small sample of the beginning of the song (the main riff) can be heard at the end of the advert.
- Professional boxer Kelly Pavlik used the song as his entrance music.
- American sports channel NESN used the intro of the song on a highlight reel.
- This song is featured on an episode of Pimp My Ride International, season one, episode four.

== Charts ==
Chart (2002)	Peak position
Australia (ARIA)	12
Austria (Ö3 Austria Top 40)	44
Canada Digital Songs (Billboard)	21
European Hot 100 Singles (Billboard)	31
Finland (Suomen virallinen lista)	7
Germany (GfK)	35
Hungary (Single Top 40)	6
Ireland (IRMA)	15
Italy (FIMI)	12
Latvian Airplay (LAIPA)	32
Netherlands (Single Top 100)	58
Norway (VG-lista)	18
Quebec Airplay (ADISQ)	28
Scotland Singles (OCC)	11
Switzerland (Schweizer Hitparade)	34
UK Singles (OCC)	12
UK Rock & Metal (OCC)	1
US Billboard Hot 100	72
US Alternative Airplay (Billboard)	4
US Mainstream Rock (Billboard)	4

== Certifications ==
Region	Certification	Certified units/sales
Australia (ARIA)	Gold	35,000^{^}
New Zealand (RMNZ)	Gold	15,000^{‡}
United Kingdom (BPI)	Silver	200,000^{‡}
^{^} Shipments figures based on certification alone.^{‡} Sales+streaming figures based on certification alone.
