= Thoughtless =

2002 single by Korn

Single by Korn

from the album Untouchables
- Released: 2002
- Genre: Nu metal
- Length: 4:32
- Label: Epic
- Songwriters: Reginald Arvizu; Jonathan Davis; James Shaffer; David Silveria; Brian Welch
- Producers: Korn; Michael Beinhorn

Korn singles chronology
"Here to Stay" (2002)	"Thoughtless" (2002)	"Alone I Break" (2002)

Music video
- "Thoughtless" on YouTube

"Thoughtless" is a song by American nu metal band Korn. It was released as the second single from the band's fifth studio album, Untouchables (2002). The single peaked at No. 6, No. 8 and No. 11 on Billboard's Mainstream Rock, Bubbling Under Hot 100 and Modern Rock Tracks charts, respectively, as well as at No. 37 on the UK singles chart.

== Live performances ==
This song was introduced to fans during a live show at the Hammerstein Ballroom, in New York City on June 10, 2002, which celebrated the release of Untouchables. This performance appears on the DVD release entitled Live. "Thoughtless" has been played during the Untouchables promotional tour, in 2002, but it was scrapped from the band's setlist one year later. It eventually returned in 2006 on the See You on the Other Side World Tour as a part of a medley. The full song was played at the 2006 Family Values Tour and the Escape from the Studio Tour. It has most recently been performed as part of their Korn: Monumental live stream.

== Music video ==
In the beginning, a high-school aged boy (who is revealed to be called Floyd Louis Cifer in a yearbook, and whose first name was the working title of "Thoughtless" on the unmastered, leaked version of Untouchables), portrayed by Aaron Paul (who was 22 at the time), is walking through the hallways of his school. Four girls are teasing and looking at him in disgust. A group of jocks on the other side of the hallway attack and give him dirty looks. In the next scene, Floyd is in his science class drawing strange pictures in his notebook. Song titles from Untouchables can also be seen. He then goes to the pool to swim. However, the jocks find Floyd there and attempt to drown him. After that, he is in the locker room wrapped in a towel and is seen increasingly agitated. We then see Floyd in his room looking at a yearbook. He throws the yearbook at his window and looks in the phonebook for a service which says "Fantasy Escorts." He calls the service and shows up at his prom with a woman (portrayed by Aimee Sweet from Penthouse Pets). He vomits on everyone who has bullied him and gets his revenge. Korn performs inside his mind throughout the video. Jonathan Davis appears on his back in one scene. There is another version of the video known as the "performance version", that only shows Korn performing the song in the room featured in the original music video.

== Reception ==
Rolling Stone was a little average about the song, saying: "On the single “Thoughtless,” Jonathan Davis sings a line that even today leaps out as an extraordinarily forbidden sentiment: “I wanna kill and rape you the way you raped me.” Does he literally mean this? (Davis has gone on record as a survivor of childhood sexual abuse.) Or is it a metaphor for his feelings about the music biz? Either way, the song has a tremendous topical power that’s bound to be contemplated or misunderstood. Korn rarely identify the “you” they’re constantly battling." The New York Times said that the song had "vindictiveness". NME was very positive about the song: "Davis stops giving into melodrama and remembers that he has a lot to be extremely angry about. [...] 'Thoughtless' marries the taut grooves of Fugazi with a refrain of 'why are you trying to make fun of me?'"

== Cover versions ==
The song was covered by Evanescence on tour and for their 2004 live album and concert DVD Anywhere but Home, featuring a piano arrangement by lead singer Amy Lee.

== Track listing ==
Enhanced maxi CD single

1. "Thoughtless" – 4:32
2. "Thoughtless (D Cooley Remix featuring DJ Z-Trip)" – 3:52
3. "Thoughtless (Dante Ross Remix)" – 4:21
4. "Here to Stay (Tone Toven and Sleep Remix)" – 3:28
5. "Here to Stay (Remixed by Mindless Self Indulgence)" – 3:45
6. "Thoughtless" (video) – 4:32

DVD single

1. "Thoughtless" (video) - 4:32

== Charts ==
=== Weekly charts ===
Weekly chart performance for "Thoughtless" by Korn
Chart (2002)	Peak position
Canada (Nielsen SoundScan)	10
Chile (Notimex)	16
Europe (Eurochart Hot 100)	87
Germany (GfK)	74
Ireland (IRMA)	39
Quebec Airplay (ADISQ)	45
Scotland Singles (OCC)	37
Switzerland (Schweizer Hitparade)	82
UK Singles (OCC)	37
UK Rock & Metal (OCC)	3
US Bubbling Under Hot 100 (Billboard)	8
US Alternative Airplay (Billboard)	11
US Mainstream Rock (Billboard)	6

=== Year-end charts ===
Year-end chart performance for "Thoughtless"
Chart (2002)	Position
Canada (Nielsen SoundScan)	102
