= Untouchables (album) =

Studio album by Korn
- Released: June 11, 2002
- Recorded: April–November 2001
- Studios: Conway Studios (Hollywood, California); The Village (Los Angeles, California)
- Genres: Nu metal; alternative metal
- Length: 65:00
- Labels: Immortal; Epic
- Producers: Korn; Michael Beinhorn

Korn chronology
All Mixed Up (2001)	Untouchables (2002)	Take a Look in the Mirror (2003)

Alternative cover
- Limited edition with bonus DVD

Singles from Untouchables
- 1. "Here to Stay" Released: June 11, 2002; 2. "Thoughtless" Released: July 15, 2002; 3. "Alone I Break" Released: November 11, 2002

Untouchables is the fifth studio album by American nu metal band Korn. The album was officially released on June 11, 2002, and featured the Grammy-winning single "Here to Stay". Untouchables debuted at number two on the Billboard 200 with 495,991 copies sold during its first week, second only to Eminem's The Eminem Show. The album received positive reviews from music critics. It was certified platinum on July 11, 2002, and has sold at least 1.4 million copies in the United States.

== Background and recording ==
Korn commenced writing Untouchables in early 2001. Tension between band members grew and, in an effort to lessen their tensions and distractions, they continued writing in Scottsdale, Arizona, in hope that the new landscape would inspire them in writing songs. They finished writing the album then went back to Los Angeles, California to begin recording. Hostility between band members was still there. During the tour, band members began to consider firing bassist Reginald "Fieldy" Arvizu due to his drug abuse problem, but decided against it.

Untouchables was recorded at Conway Studios, in Hollywood, California and The Village, in Los Angeles, California. The album was produced by Michael Beinhorn and recorded by Frank Filipetti. The album featured the same member line-up as their previous four studio albums. It is the first album recorded in 96 kHz digital sound. It was mixed by Andy Wallace and mastered by Howie Weinberg. On the album's release date, June 11, 2002, a single, "Here to Stay" was released by Sony Music Distribution. The album was re-released on November 12, 2002, as a last-ditch effort to rejuvenate album sales, which had fallen shortly after the album's first week on the Billboard 200. This limited edition features different artwork, and a bonus DVD, containing a live version of "Here to Stay", performance versions of the "Here to Stay" and "Thoughtless" music videos, and a live recording of "Got the Life".

The band has revealed that the total recording costs of Untouchables were estimated at $3,000,000 due to recording/living expenses and keeping their 15-person crew on retainer for the nearly two years it took to finish the album. As part of the total cost were included five houses rented for $10,000 apiece for four months, when they moved to Phoenix. When they came to Los Angeles, they rented five houses for $10,000 apiece for four more months; and a house rented for $8,000 a week, when they went to Canada. Jonathan Davis commented in an interview with Noisey:

"We were coming off of Issues, and we wanted to make an amazing record. That's when we hooked up with Michael Beinhorn, and Beinhorn's whole vision was to make an amazing sounding rock record that could never be made again. [...] I wanted to shoot a documentary about that record. We spent so much money, the drums alone we spent a whole month just getting drum sounds. There were 50 mics just on the drumset that they picked out and tested. [...] Usually I do my vocals and it takes me a month or two weeks, but just vocals it took me five, almost six months. With Beinhorn, sometimes I'd walk in and sing and he'd just say, "Go home, your voice ain't right." [...] It was the peak and pinnacle of everything in Korn. I still can't believe how much work went in on it. It was a lot."

Untouchables is listed as the 9th most expensive album ever made.

== Reception ==
Professional ratings
Aggregate scores
Source	Rating
Metacritic	80/100
Review scores
Source	Rating
AllMusic	3.5/5 stars
Entertainment Weekly	C
The Guardian	3/5 stars
New York Daily News	Favorable
The New York Times	Favorable
NME	(8/10)
Playlouder	4.5/5 stars
Q	4/5 stars
Rolling Stone	3/5 stars

Untouchables sold over 495,000 copies in its first week. The album debuted at number two on Billboard. Davis blamed Internet piracy for the drop in sales compared to previous albums, since the album had leaked onto file-sharing websites with a different track order and song titles more than two months prior to its official release date.

According to the review aggregator Metacritic, Untouchables received "generally favorable reviews" based on a weighted average score of 80 out of 100 from 11 critic scores. It remained their most critically acclaimed album for 17 years until the release of their 2019 album, The Nothing, which currently sits at an 83/100. In a 2021 retrospective review, Metal Hammer deemed Untouchables to be Korn's greatest album.

== Track listing ==
=== Original release ===
All songs written by Korn.

No.	Title	Length
1.	"Here to Stay"	4:31
2.	"Make Believe"	4:37
3.	"Blame"	3:51
4.	"Hollow Life"	4:09
5.	"Bottled Up Inside"	4:00
6.	"Thoughtless"	4:32
7.	"Hating"	5:10
8.	"One More Time"	4:39
9.	"Alone I Break"	4:16
10.	"Embrace"	4:27
11.	"Beat It Upright" ( (Note: "Beat It Upright" was not included on the edited version of the album.))	4:15
12.	"Wake Up Hate"	3:12
13.	"I'm Hiding"	3:57
14.	"No One's There"	5:01
Total length:		60:37

=== Limited edition ===
Limited edition hidden track
No.	Title	Length
1.	"Here to Stay (T-Ray's Mix)" ( (Note: "Here to Stay (T-Ray's Mix)" is a hidden track on the limited edition, beginning at 5:06 after "No One's There". On some standard edition pressings, it is its own separate hidden track, without the silence.))	4:21

Bonus DVD
No.	Title	Length
1.	"Here to Stay (Live at Hammerstein)"
2.	"Here to Stay (Performance Version)"
3.	"Thoughtless (Performance Version)"
4.	"Got the Life (Live at Hammerstein)"

=== 2002 leaked version ===
2002 leaked version track listing
No.	Title	Length
1.	"From Your Heart" (original title for "Blame")	3:54
2.	"Chasing Me" (original title for "Make Believe")	4:42
3.	"Full of Sorrow" (original title for "Bottled Up Inside")	4:03
4.	"Tear Me Down" (original title for "Thoughtless")	4:35
5.	"In Place" (original version of "Embrace", contains an extra outro that was removed in worldwide release)	4:49
6.	"I Want to Be Gone" (original version of "I'm Hiding", contains an extended final chorus that was shortened in worldwide release)	4:33
7.	"Here to Stay"	4:32
8.	"Falling Through Time" (original title for "Hollow Life")	4:10
9.	"All My Hate" (original version of "Wake Up Hate", contains an extended final chorus that was shortened in worldwide release)	3:28
10.	"Leave This Place" (original title for "No One's There")	5:02
11.	"Corners of My Mind" (original title for "One More Time")	4:42
12.	"Help Me Stay Alive" (original version of "Beat It Upright", contains an extra intro that was removed in worldwide release)	4:25
13.	"Make It Go Away" (original title for "Alone I Break")	4:18
14.	"Everything That I Could Find" (original title for "Hating")	5:09
Total length:		62:22

== Personnel ==
=== Korn ===
- Jonathan Davis – vocals
- Fieldy – bass
- Munky – guitars
- Head – guitars
- David Silveria – drums

=== Production ===
- Michael Beinhorn – producer
- Andy Wallace – mixing
- Howie Weinberg – mastering
- Jeff Kwatinetz – executive production
- Roger Lian – digital editing

== Charts ==
=== Weekly charts ===
Weekly chart performance for Untouchables
Chart (2002)	Peak position
Australian Albums (ARIA)	2
Austrian Albums (Ö3 Austria Top 40)	2
Belgian Albums (Ultratop Flanders)	3
Belgian Albums (Ultratop Wallonia)	5
Canadian Albums (Jam! CANOE)	3
Danish Albums (Tracklisten)	11
Estonian Albums (Eesti Tipp-40)	1
Europe (European Top 100 Albums)	2
Dutch Albums (MegaCharts)	13
Finnish Albums (Suomen virallinen lista)	3
French Albums (SNEP)	6
German Albums (Media Control AG)	1
Greek Albums (IFPI)	2
Hungarian Albums (MAHASZ)	7
Icelandic Albums (Tónlist)	1
Irish Albums (IRMA)	2
Italian Albums (FIMI)	3
Japanese Albums (Oricon)	15
New Zealand Albums (RIANZ)	4
Norwegian Albums (VG-lista)	8
Polish Albums Chart	8
Portuguese Albums (AFP)	7
Scottish Albums (Official Charts)	5
Spanish Albums (AFYVE)	25
Swedish Albums (Sverigetopplistan)	7
Swedish Hard Rock Albums (Sverigetopplistan)	1
Swiss Albums (Schweizer Hitparade)	5
UK Albums (OCC)	4
UK Rock & Metal Albums (Official Charts)	1
US Billboard 200	2
US Internet Albums (Billboard)	2
Venezuela Albums (Record Report)	1

=== Year-end charts ===
Year-end chart performance for Untouchables
Chart (2002)	Position
Australian Albums (ARIA)	92
Austrian Albums (Ö3 Austria)	38
Belgian Albums (Ultratop Flanders)	68
Belgian Albums (Ultratop Wallonia)	59
Belgian Alternative Albums (Ultratop Flanders)	31
Canadian Albums (Nielsen SoundScan)	85
Canadian Alternative Albums (Nielsen SoundScan)	24
Canadian Metal Albums (Nielsen SoundScan)	11
European Albums (Music & Media)	76
French Albums (SNEP)	127
German Albums (Offizielle Top 100)	48
Swiss Albums (Schweizer Hitparade)	92
UK Albums (OCC)	150
US Billboard 200	53
Worldwide Albums (IFPI)	38

== Certifications ==
Region	Certification	Certified units/sales
Australia (ARIA)	Platinum	70,000^{^}
Mexico (AMPROFON)	Gold	75,000^{^}
New Zealand (RMNZ)	Gold	7,500^{^}
United Kingdom (BPI)	Gold	100,000^{^}
United States (RIAA)	Platinum	1,000,000^{^}
Venezuela	Gold	10,000
^{^} Shipments figures based on certification alone.

== Bibliography ==
- Arvizu, Reginald (2009). Got The Life. William Marrow. ISBN 978-0-06-166249-2.

== See also ==
- List of most expensive albums
