= Little Samson =

1992 video game

- Western cover art by Greg Winters
- Developer: Takeru
- Publisher: Taito
- Director: Shinichi Yoshimoto
- Producer: Shinichi Yoshimoto
- Artist: Kiyoshi Utata
- Writer: Shinichi Yoshimoto
- Platform: Nintendo Entertainment System
- Release: JP: June 26, 1992; NA: November 1992; EU: March 13, 1993
- Genres: Action, platform
- Mode: Single-player

Little Samson (Note: Known in Japan as Seirei Densetsu Lickle (Japanese: 聖鈴伝説リックル, Hepburn: Seirei Densetsu Rikkuru; lit. 'Holy Bell Legend Lickle').) is a 1992 action–platform video game developed by Takeru and published by Taito for the Nintendo Entertainment System (NES). The game stars four heroes summoned to stop the demon king Ta-Keed from wreaking havoc on the kingdom of Forgy. Each hero has different abilities and the player can switch between the four at any time.

Little Samson was directed by Shinichi Yoshimoto, who had worked as a designer on Capcom titles such as Ghouls 'n Ghosts and Strider. Kiyoshi Utata, who also worked on Cocoron and Nostalgia 1907, made the game's artwork. The game received favorable reviews. Critics praised the audiovisual side and noted that swapping between characters added an element of strategy to the action. The game is considered one of the best NES games in retrospect, and the North American release has become an expensive collector's item.

== Gameplay ==
Little Samson in a palace attacking a knight boss who summons lightning against him

Little Samson is a side-scrolling action–platform game reminiscent of the Mega Man franchise. It takes place in a world once terrorized by the demon king Ta-Keed until he was sealed away by gods, whose power was dispersed in the form of four bells. When the kingdom of Forgy was threatened by Ta-Keed, emperor Hans VI and his aides sealed him deep within a mountain. One day, a lightning released Ta-Keed, and emperor Hans XIV led his army into battle, but they were powerless against the demon king's subordinates. Hans XIV summoned four warriors who possess the bells with the task of defeating Ta-Keed.

The player chooses between one of four characters—the climber Little Samson, the dragon Kikira, the golem Gamm, and the mouse K.O—each with advantages and disadvantages. Samson attacks enemies by throwing bells and can climb walls and ceilings. Kikira can fly for brief periods and breathe fire that can be charged up, while her claws allow her traction on icy surfaces. Gamm is slow but strong, can walk on spikes and attack with short but powerful blows in any direction. K.O. has the least health but is fast, can fit through narrow passages, can climb walls and ceilings, and attacks by dropping bombs.

The first four stages act as a tutorial for each character and can be played in any order. Upon completing their respective stages, the characters gather before Hans XIV, who appoints Samson as the leader of the team. Kikira is opposed to this decision and instigates a fight against him for dominance, though concedes after her defeat. The player can switch between characters at any time during the gameplay, and stage progression occurs in a linear sequence. There are twenty stages in total, each divided into thirteen levels with branching paths and a boss encounter per stage. There are two difficulty levels: Easy and Normal. Playing on Normal difficulty summons the true final boss.

Throughout each stage, the player fights enemies and avoids obstacles while collecting items and power-ups including extra lives, hearts that replenish health, crystal orbs that increase the capacity of a character's life bar and potions that fully restore health, though each character can keep only one at a time. Each character has a separate lifebar, but they all share a pool of lives. If Samson dies, the player is forced to start over, but if any other character dies, they will remain dead until the active stage is completed or if one of the deceased character has a potion to revive them. The player can resume their progress via a password system provided after defeating the boss.

== Development and release ==
Little Samson was created by Takeru, which had previously developed Cocoron for the Nintendo Entertainment System (NES). It was directed, produced, and written by Shinichi Yoshimoto, who had been a designer for Capcom on titles such as Ghouls 'n Ghosts and Strider. Artwork for the game was done by Kiyoshi Utata, who had worked on Cocoron and Nostalgia 1907. The Japanese and Western covers were illustrated by Mitsuru Todoriki and Greg Winters, respectively. Taito published it in Japan as Seirei Densetsu Lickle on June 26, 1992. The game was shown at the 1992 Summer Consumer Electronics Show and released in North America in November of that year. A European release followed on March 13, 1993. Due to poor marketing leading to low sales in North America, Little Samson became one of the rarest and most expensive NES titles, commanding high prices on the secondary collecting market.

In 2022, Limited Run Games's CEO, Josh Fairhurst, stated that Little Samson was high on his list of titles he sought to bring back. After contacting Taito, which suggested that game's rights "might be with the owner", Limited Run Games tracked down the owner, who did not know who held the rights. In 2025, Limited Run Games announced that Little Samson would be re-released for Nintendo Switch, PlayStation 5, and PC via Steam in 2026. Fairhurst explained that they acquired the license from the Agency for Cultural Affairs through Alexander Aniel, head of business development in Japan for Limited Run Games, and Tatsujin, a Japanese video game developer and licensee founded in 2017 by Masahiro Yuge, a former Toaplan employee, who introduced him to a Japanese agent who worked with Limited Run Games on the re-release.

== Reception ==
Reception

Review scores
Publication	Score
Famitsu	6/10, 5/10, 7/10, 5/10
Game Players	5/10
HobbyConsolas	72/100
Video Games (DE)	69%
Play Time	71%

The Japanese publication Micom BASIC Magazine ranked the game ninth in popularity in its September 1992 issue, and it received a 21.2/30 score in a readers' poll conducted by Family Computer Magazine. Famitsu's four reviewers found the game's audiovisual side to be good for the NES and that each character was unique but believed the action lacked intensity. George Sinfield and Rob Noel of Nintendo Power noted that swapping between four characters with their special skills added a strategy element to the game's action. Club Nintendo deemed Little Samson an entertaining game, highlighting the audiovisual presentation, character and enemy animation, and level of challenge. Billy Moon of Game Players Nintendo Guide found the game to be average, feeling that the character switching kept it interesting, but that its graphics were unexciting and the unlimited continues almost rendered the password feature useless.

Manfred Neumayer of Video Games commended the game's graphics for their variety and attention to detail, likable characters, and the difficulty level of the stages. Tony Jones of Play Time regarded it as a fun and complex the game, while HobbyConsolas' Manuel del Campo liked the character switching ability and visuals while criticizing the dull sound. Nintendomagasinet's Tobias Bjarneby considered it a fun platform game due to its good controls and four different characters. Merche Garcia of Superjuegos underscored the animation of the characters, particularly that of the mouse. Ação Games regarded Little Samson as one of the best games for the NES.

=== Retrospective coverage ===
Retrospective ratings

Review scores
Publication	Score
AllGame	4.5/5
Jeuxvideo.com	16/20

In retrospectives, Little Samson has been listed among the best NES games by IGN, USgamer, and Paste. AllGame's Skyler Miller wrote that "Little Samson is a tour de force of excellent game design, attractive graphics and pure entertainment value." Club Nintendo described it as "a work worthy of admiration" and highlighted the large bosses, particularly the dragon enemy. Greatkev of Jeuxvideo.com praised the game's colorful graphics, gameplay, and soundtrack, but found the simple plot and lack of dialogue to be its weak points. Retro Gamer called it one of the most technically impressive NES games, citing its intricate sprites, enemy designs, and impressive levels.

Hardcore Gaming 101's Michael Plasket lauded the game's visual appeal, music, gameplay mechanics, difficulty curve, and overall duration. Writing for Retro magazine, Jeremy Parish stated that "Little Samson is a true gem of a NES platformer, with some of the most stunning graphics and music ever seen on the system". GamesRadar+ listed it as one of the thirty games they wish had been included on the NES Classic Edition. Den of Geek regarded Little Samson as one of the most underrated NES titles, while Destructoid's Zoey Handley gave positive remarks on the game's visuals and character animation fluidity but questioned some of its design choices.
