= Mega Man (1995 video game) =

Game Gear action-platform video game

- Cover art
- Developer: Freestyle
- Publisher: U.S. Gold
- Producers: Richard Siddall; Daniel Llewellyn
- Programmers: Michael Hart; Paul Carter
- Artist: Paul Gregory
- Composer: David Lowe
- Series: Mega Man
- Platform: Game Gear
- Release: NA: October 10, 1995
- Genre: Platform
- Mode: Single-player

Mega Man is a 1995 platform game developed by Freestyle and published by U.S. Gold for the Game Gear. It is a spin-off of Capcom's Mega Man series and the only original game to be developed for a Sega console; it was only released in North America. The game features Mega Man fighting against the mad scientist Dr. Wily and the six Robot Masters under his control, and features bosses and stages from Mega Man 4 and Mega Man 5.

Mega Man received generally positive reviews from video game critics upon release, though retrospective reviews were more mixed. While the game was praised for the faithfulness of its graphics and sound to the NES titles upon which it was based, its gameplay was criticized for its excessive level of zoom and fast enemy movement that led to unfair difficulty.

== Gameplay ==
Mega Man in a boss fight against Toad Man

Mega Man is an action-platform game that is very similar to the original series. The protagonist, Mega Man, is able to run, jump, shoot, and climb his way past obstacles and enemies. It is based on elements from the NES games of Mega Man 4 and Mega Man 5. Differences from previous entries include the lack of continues after running out of lives. Mega Man's robotic canine companion Rush, using an ability called Rush Coil, assists in helping the character jump higher.

The Robot Masters featured at the beginning are Bright Man, Napalm Man, Star Man, and Stone Man. Mega Man 4 antagonist Dr. Cossack's fortress contains Wave Man's and Toad Man's levels and respective bosses. Wily's fortress is Quick Man's stage from Mega Man 2, with the Wily fight taken from Mega Man 5.

== Development ==
Mega Man was published by British-based publisher U.S. Gold. U.S. Gold sublicensed the series from Capcom and had a different company, Freestyle, develop the game. It was released exclusively in North America on the Game Gear in 1995.

== Reception ==
Reception

Review scores
Publication	Score
GamePro	3.75/5
Mean Machines Sega	75%
Sega Power	87%

Reception to the game was generally positive. Mega Man received an 87 percent from the UK-based magazine Sega Power. A reviewer for GamePro gave the game a total score of 3.75 out of 5, complimenting its graphics and sound, but noting that the small Game Gear screen increases the difficulty. Mean Machines Sega gave it a 75 percent, with Gus Swan calling it a "close conversion of the Megaman [sic] style".

Retrospective reviews for the game have been mixed. 1UP.com's Nadia Oxford elaborated, "Mega Man often has to fight with his enemies in such close quarters, he might as well hold their hands and try his luck at a friendship. The constant screen-scrolling and sticky controls makes for a very frustrating game, although the Game Gear's low battery life ends the torment in a couple of hours anyway." GameSpot contributors Christian Nutt and Justin Speer described it as "a decent, if somewhat sluggish, translation of the Mega Man series". Damien Butt from Retro Gamer, while giving it praise for its graphics, was more mixed towards its gameplay, criticizing its difficulty and the enemies moving too fast for the player. Robert Workman for GameZone believed the game deserved a second chance for re-release, praising it for its controls, visuals, and sound.

In 2013, due to an ESRB listing, there was speculation that the Game Gear title was being released for the Nintendo 3DS Virtual Console. Despite the listing, nothing came of it. Because of its North American exclusivity, copies of the game garner a high price point, with complete copies going for $200 as of 2013, and $1,800 as of 2023.
