= Mega Man (1994 TV series) =

American-Japanese superhero animated television series

- Title card depicting Mega Man (right) and Rush
- Genre: Science fiction Action/Adventure; Superhero
- Based on: Mega Man by Capcom
- Developed by: Joe Ruby; Ken Spears
- Written by: Jeffrey Scott (season 1); Michael Maurer (season 2); Richard Merwin (seasons 1-2)
- Directed by: Katsumi Minokuchi (chief)
- Creative director: Cesar De Castro
- Voices of: Ian James Corlett; Scott McNeil; Jim Byrnes; Terry Klassen; Robyn Ross; Garry Chalk
- Composers: Tom Keenlyside; John Mitchell
- Countries of origin: United States; Japan
- Original language: English
- No. of seasons: 2
- No. of episodes: 27

Production
- Executive producers: Kenzo Tsujimoto; Toshihiko Sato; Joe Ruby; Ken Spears
- Producers: Akio Sakai; Jun Aida; Eiichi Takahashi; Daniel Kletzky
- Cinematography: Mitsuru Sugiura
- Editors: Craig Paulsen; Toshio Henmi
- Running time: 24 minutes
- Production companies: Ruby-Spears Productions; Ashi Productions; Capcom

Original release
- Network: Syndication
- Release: September 11, 1994 – January 19, 1996

Related
- Mega Man: Fully Charged

Mega Man, known in Japan as Rockman USA (ロックマンUSA) is an American-Japanese science fiction superhero animated television series co-produced by Ruby-Spears Productions and Ashi Productions, and based on the video game series of the same name by Capcom. It aired from September 11, 1994, to January 19, 1996, with two seasons and twenty-seven episodes. A spin-off based on Mega Man X was planned, but did not go through.

The rights to the series are currently owned by Wildbrain.

== Plot ==
Dr. Light and Dr. Wily were robotic scientists and coworkers at a laboratory. One day, they completed an advanced prototype that began to destroy the laboratory after being activated, which Light believed was due to its guidance system, which Wily had programmed. That night, Wily stole the plans and escaped despite Light catching him, using the plans to build Proto Man.

Dr. Light later built Rock and Roll, advanced robots with personalities, along with Ice Man, Guts Man, and Cut Man. After Wily and Proto Man stole Ice Man, Guts Man, and Cut Man and reprogrammed them to serve Wily, Wily attempted to reprogram Rock and Roll. However, Rock tricked Wily by claiming that Light built "super warrior robots" and that, if he let them go, he would tell him how to defeat the robots. Since Wily believes that robots are incapable of lying, Rock used this to create a distraction and escape with Roll. Afterwards, Light decided to reprogram and rebuild Rock as Mega Man, who protects the world from Wily's forces and other evil.

== Characters ==
=== Main ===
- Mega Man (voiced by Ian James Corlett) – Originally Rock, an assistant robot built by Dr. Light, he was rebuilt as a fighting robot after Wily reprogrammed Light's first industrial robots and attempted to reprogram Rock and Roll. He wields a plasma cannon on his left arm and can copy the abilities of Wily's robots by touching them. He has several catchphrases, the most common being "Sizzling circuits".
- Dr. Light (voiced by Jim Byrnes) – A scientist and inventor who built Rock and Roll, as well as Cut Man, Guts Man and Ice Man. He once worked with Dr. Wily, creating a line of industrial robots, until Wily stole their plans and a defective prototype. After Wily reprogrammed his industrial robots, Light rebuilt Rock into Mega Man to stop his plans. Throughout the series, Light builds robots and inventions to help humanity. Jim Byrnes would later reprise his role as Dr. Light in the English dub of Mega Man: Upon a Star.
- Roll (voiced by Robyn Ross) – A household robot and Mega Man's sister, who assists him on missions. She possesses several home-appliances, most notably a vacuum cleaner. Unlike her usual video game appearance, usually that of a young to teenage-like girl, Roll, in this series has an appearance of young adult-like woman.
- Rush (voiced by Ian James Corlett) – Mega Man's robot dog, who has an enhanced sense of smell and hearing. He has several modes, with Mega Man using his jet-mode, in which he transforms into a jet board, for transportation. Though he mostly parrots others, he seemingly has a limited capacity for speech, such as announcing "Mega, Mega. Right back. Messages". during commercial bumpers.

=== Supporting ===
- Eddie (voiced by Scott McNeil) – A suitcase on legs that delivers Energy Cans (E-Tanks) to Mega Man when he is critically low on energy.
- Met/Doc – Dr. Light's assistant, who is known as "Doc" and has a flexible grabber arm it uses to produce items.
- Mayor of New York City (voiced by Garry Chalk in most appearances, Jim Byrnes in "Mega Dreams", understudied by Scott McNeil in "Campus Commandos") – The mayor of New York City, who often calls upon Mega Man when a crisis involving Wily threatens New York City. Despite being unable to stop Wily, he stands up to him during "The Big Shake", refusing to surrender control of the city despite his threats and Mega Man being out of commission. "Crime of the Century" introduces a new mayor, who is black.
- Bree Ricotta (voiced by Robyn Ross) – A news reporter. Her name is derived from brie and ricotta, types of cheese.
- Mega Man X (voiced by Michael Donovan) – The protagonist of the Mega Man X series. He appears in "Mega X", where he pursues Vile and Spark Mandrill through time to stop them from taking Lightanium back to their own time to help Sigma finance his wars against humans. He shares Mega Man's ability to copy abilities, but can do so multiple times.

=== Villains ===
- Dr. Wily (voiced by Scott McNeil) – Dr. Light's former assistant, who stole the plans for the prototype industrial robots after their first test with a humanoid robot failed, using the plans to build Proto Man. He then fled, convinced that Light had sabotaged his work in order to take credit, before returning with Proto Man and reprogramming Light's industrial robots to exact vengeance on humanity. McNeil reprised his role as Wily in the English dub of Mega Man: Upon a Star.
  - Proto Man (voiced by Scott McNeil) – Mega Man's older brother and Wily's lackey, who has similar abilities to Mega Man. Despite working for Wily, Proto Man often disobeys him and ruins his plans, as he is obsessed with destroying Mega Man or recruiting him to Dr. Wily's side. Unlike in the games, Proto Man does not carry a shield and is loyal to Wily alone.
  - Batontons – Spy robots based on the Bubble Bat enemies in Mega Man 2.
- Vile (voiced by Lee Tockar) – A battle Reploid and Maverick Warrior who appears in "Mega X" along with Spark Mandrill, having traveled back in time to obtain Lightanium for their master Sigma, the leader of the Mavericks, and finance his war against humans. After learning that he possesses the schematics of the power plant containing Lightanium, Vile forms an alliance with Wily in exchange for allowing him to use some of the Lightanium to power up his blaster. However, his plans are thwarted by Mega Man and Mega Man X, who returns him to his time.
  - Spark Mandrill (voiced by Richard Newman) – A mandrill-themed battle Reploid and Maverick Warrior and Vile's partner, who appears in "Mega X".

==== Robot Masters ====
Various Robot Masters from the first five classic Mega Man games appear throughout the series.

- Cut Man (voiced by Terry Klassen) – One of Dr. Light's original six industrial robots, who was created to aid in logging and chop down trees. Along with Guts Man, he is one of Dr. Wily's main lackeys. He wields a weapon that is thrown like a boomerang.
- Guts Man (voiced by Garry Chalk) – One of Dr. Light's original six industrial robots, who was created to aid in construction. Along with Cut Man and Proto Man, he is one of Dr. Wily's main lackeys.
- Ice Man (voiced by Terry Klassen) – One of Dr. Light's original six industrial robots, an Inuit-themed robot who was created to aid in arctic work. In "Ice Age", he becomes jealous of Dr. Wily's plot involving Air Man and takes revenge using his own plan, which involves Ice Bots.
- Fire Man – One of Dr. Light's original six industrial robots, a fire-themed robot who was created to aid in construction.
- Bomb Man (voiced by Terry Klassen) – A bomb-throwing robot and one of Dr. Light's original six industrial robots, who was created to aid in demolition.
- Elec Man (voiced by Terry Klassen) – An electrical robot and one of Dr. Light's original six industrial robots, who was created to aid in construction. His weapon is the Thunder Beam.
- Air Man (voiced by Terry Klassen) – A fan-themed robot who does not get along with Ice Man.
- Crash Man (voiced by Terry Klassen) – A robot who appears in "Mega-Pinocchio", attacking a building until Mega Man stops him. His weapon is the Crash Bombs, which are renamed Time Bombs.
- Heat Man (voiced by Garry Chalk) – A Zippo lighter-shaped robot that can spit fire from his mouth.
- Metal Man (voiced by Ian James Corlett) – A robot who attacks with circular saw-shaped metal blades and can turn his hands into saw blades.
- Quick Man (voiced by Jim Byrnes) – A robot who attacks with the boomerang from his head and laser boomerangs shot from his wrist.
- Wood Man (voiced by Richard Newman) – A wood-themed robot, whose weapon is the Leaf Shield.
- Gemini Man (voiced by Tony Sampson) – A robot whose weapon is the Gemini Laser. He portrays the lead guitarist of the band Cold Steel as part of Dr. Wily's plot to brainwash humans into obeying him.
- Hard Man (voiced by Terry Klassen) – A robot whose weapon is the Hard Knuckle. In "Bad Day at Peril Park", Dr. Wily uses him as part of his plot to brainwash the attendees of Fun World into thinking that they are robots.
- Magnet Man (voiced by Terry Klassen) – A magnet-themed robot with magnetic abilities.
- Needle Man (voiced by Garry Chalk) – A needle-themed robot who wields the Needle Cannon.
- Shadow Man (voiced by Terry Klassen) – A ninja-themed robot who can throw the blade on his head.
- Snake Man (voiced by Ian James Corlett) – A snake-themed robot whose weapons are the Search Snakes.
- Spark Man (voiced by Garry Chalk in his normal voice, Tony Sampson in his disguised voice) – A spark-themed robot whose weapon is the Spark Shot. He appears in "Mega-Pinocchio" before having a larger role when he portrays the drummer of the band Cold Steel as part of Dr. Wily's plot to brainwash humans into obeying him.
- Top Man (voiced by Jim Byrnes) – A top-themed robot.
- Bright Man (voiced by Garry Chalk) – A robot with a lightbulb atop his head. His weapon is the Flash Stopper, which induces temporary blindness.
- Dive Man (voiced by Terry Klassen) – A submarine-themed robot whose weapon is the Dive Missiles.
- Drill Man (voiced by Scott McNeil) – A drill-themed robot.
- Dust Man (voiced by Terry Klassen) – A vacuum cleaner-themed robot.
- Pharaoh Man (voiced by Terry Klassen) – A pharaoh-themed robot.
- Toad Man (voiced by Terry Klassen) – A toad-themed robot whose weapon is the Rain Flush. In "Robosaur Park", the Rain Flush, combined with Dr. Wily's formula, is used to devolve the minds of robots exposed to it.
- Ring Man (voiced by Garry Chalk) – A ring-themed robot.
- Crystal Man (voiced by Terry Klassen) – A crystal-themed robot who assists Dr. Wily in targeting a space station's lenses. His weapon is the Crystal Eye.
- Dark Man (voiced by Garry Chalk) – A robot with the ability to manipulate electromagnetic energies.
- Gravity Man (voiced by Jim Byrnes) – A gravity-manipulating robot.
- Gyro Man (voiced by Garry Chalk) – A robot with helicopter blades on his back. He is used to portray the lead guitarist of the band Cold Steel as part of Dr. Wily's plot to brainwash humans into obeying him.
- Star Man (voiced by Terry Klassen) – A star-themed robot, whose weapon is the Star Crash.
- Stone Man (voiced by Garry Chalk) – A rock-themed robot who wields a cannon and the Power Stone.
- Wave Man – An aquatic robot, whose weapon is the Water Wave.
- Napalm Man – An armored robot equipped with missiles, who only appears in the intro.

== Production ==
The series had a budget of $300,000 per episode. It originally had an art style matching the games' artwork. "Appearance in Japan", the first episode of Mega Man: Upon a Star, was made as test footage and intended to be a special episode of the series, as it had the same animation and used the same voice actors. However, due to the high budget, the animation style was changed. The new art style was based on redesigns of the characters Keiji Inafune drew in his spare time. If the series' art style had not changed, it would have aired alongside two similarly cancelled shows: an English dub of Magic Knight Rayearth starring Venus Terzo as Luce, and an American adaptation of Sailor Moon utilizing live-action and animation and starring Adrienne Barbeau as Queen Beryl and Queen Serenity.

=== Music ===
The series' theme song and background music was composed and produced by John Mitchell and Tom Keenlyside at Anitunes Music. An official soundtrack was released in 1996, with songs by artists such as Sugar Ray, Machines of Loving Grace, Skid Row, Junior M.A.F.I.A., CIV, Mr. Big, The Bucketheads, and Inner Circle. Most of the show's background music was reused in the Westwood Media/Ocean Productions dub of Dragon Ball Z, which aired from 2000 to 2002, replacing the soundtrack by Saban Entertainment used in the earlier Ocean dub that aired from 1996 to 1998.

== Episodes ==
=== Season 1 (1994) ===
No.	Title	Written by	Original release date
1	"The Beginning"	Mark Jones	September 11, 1994
After Dr. Wily attacks the Kennedy Airport, Mega Man is crushed by a falling object, leaving him in need of repair. While Mega Man undergoes repairs, Dr. Light reveals his history with Wily.
2	"Electric Nightmare"	Jeffrey Scott	September 18, 1994
Dr. Wily takes over the power grid with a device that allows him to control machines through electricity.
3	"Mega-Pinocchio"	Michael Maurer	September 25, 1994
Dr. Wily tricks Mega Man into believing he can make him human. In reality, he implants a chip that allows him to control him and turn him against Dr. Light, leading a robot rebellion to tarnish his reputation.
4	"The Big Shake"	Richard Merwin	October 2, 1994
Dr. Wily has found a way to create earthquakes and demands that the city surrender or be destroyed. While Dr. Light attempts to find a way to counteract Wily's earthquakes, Mega Man sets out to shut down the machine.
5	"Robosaur Park"	Jeffrey Scott	October 9, 1994
Dr. Wily releases a devolution serum that affects robots, and Dr. Light must find an antidote to cure Mega Man and the other robots before they destroy the city.
6	"The Mega Man in the Moon"	Jeffrey Scott	October 16, 1994
Mega Man must stop Dr. Wily from gaining access to a giant laser on the moon.
7	"20,000 Leaks Under the Sea"	Martin Pasko	October 23, 1994
Dr. Wily attacks an underwater mining operation before attempting to eliminate Dr. Light and Mega Man with a fake laboratory that turns out to be a mobile prison.
8	"Incredible Shrinking Mega Man"	Gary Greenfield	October 30, 1994
Dr. Wily steals gems from a museum and uses them to shrink major cities and Mega Man.
9	"Bot Transfer"	Richard Merwin	November 6, 1994
While attending a conference, the group encounters Dr. Wily's robots on the airplane and learn that he has built transport chambers capable of transferring circuits from one robot to another. Proto Man, in disguise, tricks Mega Man into entering a chamber, switching him with Snake Man. Mistaken for being the real Snake Man, Mega Man must stop Wily's plans in that form.
10	"Ice Age"	Jeffrey Scott	November 13, 1994
Dr. Wily steals technology from Zero Refrigeration Company, planning to create a giant glacier and freeze cities, drive out their leaders, and replace them with his robots. Ice Man, afraid of being replaced by Air Man, double-crosses Wily with his own plan.
11	"Cold Steel"	Michael Maurer & Matt Uitz	November 20, 1994
Gemini Man, Spark Man, and Gyro Man disguise themselves as the rock band Cold Steel to release mind-controlling music, leaving only Mega Man, Roll, and a deaf girl unaffected.
12	"Future Shock"	Michael Maurer	November 27, 1994
After Dr. Light's time machine transports Mega Man to a future where Dr. Wily has conquered Earth because Mega Man was not there to stop him, he must find a way back to his time to prevent that future.
13	"The Strange Island of Dr. Wily"	Richard Merwin	December 4, 1994
A malfunction in Dr. Wily's newest invention strands him and his robots on an island with Dr. Light, Mega Man, and Roll, and they are forced to team up to escape.

=== Season 2 (1995–96) ===
No. overall	No. in season	Title	Written by	Original release date
14	1	"Showdown at Red Gulch"	Micheal O'Mahony	September 10, 1995
Dr. Wily discovers a meteor with crystals that can empower his robots, but will eventually overload their circuits.
15	2	"Terror of the Seven Seas"	Matt Uitz	September 17, 1995
Dr. Wily steals navy battleships for parts to create a sea fort.
16	3	"Mega Dreams"	Richard Merwin & Cheryl Biggs	September 24, 1995
Dr. Wily attempts to conquer Earth with a device that can transfer his robots into dreams and hypnotize humans in their sleep.
17	4	"Robo-Spider"	Michael Maurer	October 1, 1995
After Dr. Light creates a supercomputer that can defend military bases, in order to take over the military bases, Dr. Wily sends a robot spider to drain the city of its energy and destroy the supercomputer.
18	5	"Master of Disaster"	Matt Uitz	October 8, 1995
Dr. Wily frees a genie and attempts to use his magic to conquer Earth.
19	6	"Night of the Living Monster Bots"	Doug Molitor	October 15, 1995
Dr. Wily unleashes robots based on horror movie monsters, filming the attack and using it as a threat to come if people do not pay to watch. Mega Man must fight these monster robots and his family and friends under their curse.
20	7	"Curse of the Lion Men"	Gary Greenfield	October 22, 1995
Dr. Wily's robots discover humanoid lion creatures that can transform people into lions and make robots obey them. After Dr. Light and Wily are transformed, Mega Man must find a way to return them to normal.
21	8	"The Day the Moon Fell"	Richard Merwin	October 29, 1995
After Dr. Wily pulls the moon out of its orbit and closer to Earth, causing widespread disasters, Dr. Light searches for a way to return the moon to its orbit while Mega Man must destroy Wily's device.
22	9	"Campus Commandos"	Michael Maurer	November 5, 1995
After Dr. Light founds a college to school robots in various subjects, Dr. Wily reprograms its students to help him steal his anti-gravity device.
23	10	"Brain Bots"	Mark Jones	November 12, 1995
Mega Man must stop Dr. Wily from stealing Dr. Light's new robot, Brain Bot.
24	11	"Bro Bots"	Evelyn Gabai	November 19, 1995
Proto Man supposedly switches sides to help Mega Man stop Dr. Wily's plan to replace city officials with robots, but Mega Man is suspicious of him.
25	12	"Bad Day at Peril Park"	Michael Maurer	November 26, 1995
Dr. Wily sets up an amusement park, Fun World, as a front to hypnotize visitors into thinking that they are robots.
26	13	"Mega X"	Michael Maurer & Richard Merwin	December 3, 1995
Mega Man teams up with Mega Man X, a robot from the future, to stop the Mavericks Vile and Spark Mandrill, who seek to obtain Lightanium for their master, Sigma.
27	14	"Crime of the Century"	Craig Ruby	January 19, 1996
Dr. Wily reprograms various dolls and toys to carry out robberies throughout the city, which Mega Man learns is a diversion so Wily can obtain a giant black pearl.

== Release ==
=== Broadcast ===
Mega Man entered first-run syndication in the United States on September 17, 1994, and aired new episodes through January 1996. It was rerun on Fox Family Channel (now Freeform) between 1999 and 2001.

The series initially went unreleased in Japan. In 2024, Capcom announced that the series would be released on Amazon Prime Video and on pay-per-view rental.

=== Home video release ===
Episodes were released on VHS by Sony Wonder beginning in January 1995.

The entire series was released on 2 DVD sets by ADV Films in 2003. Both sets are now out-of-print. In 2009, ADV Films re-released the 1st half of the series, but was shut down in 2009. Discotek Media released the entire series on September 30, 2014. Discotek released it on Blu-ray on October 28, 2025.

== Reception ==
At one time, Mega Man was placed as the number one weekly syndicated children's show in the Nielsen ratings.

== See also ==
- Mega Man: Upon a Star, a three-episode Japanese OVA produced in 1993 by Ashi Productions, with Ruby-Spears Productions serving as the US production consultants, and even sharing some of the 1994 Ruby-Spears series' English voice cast
- MegaMan NT Warrior
- Mega Man Star Force
- Mega Man: Fully Charged
