= Akira Kitamura =

Japanese video game designer (born 1964)

- 北村玲
- Born: 1964 (age 61–62); Japan
- Years active: 1985–1996
- Employer: Capcom (1985–1989)
- Known for: Designing Mega Man
- Notable work: Mega Man, Mega Man 2

Akira Kitamura (born 1964) is a Japanese video game designer and artist. He is the creator of the Mega Man series and the eponymous character. He worked on the first three games in the series as a planner and artist. He is also the director of the 1991 game Cocoron, which was released only in Japan.

Due to the prominent practice of only using pseudonyms for credits, Kitamura is variously credited as "Famicon Akira" or "A.K" on many of the games he worked on.

== Career ==
He worked as an artist, and overall director for Mega Man (known as Rockman in Japan) for the Famicom. He created the original static pixel art sprite for Mega Man. This was to ensure that the sprite could be properly seen against the game's backgrounds, and could work in the game. After that, the pixel art was handed over to artist Keiji Inafune who created a refined illustration of the character. Inafune refers to this process as "like a reverse character design" as it is the opposite of what typically occurs, where artists create concept art which is then translated into game's graphics.

At a special event during the 2007 Tokyo Game Show, Inafune commented on his and Akira's role in the creation of Mega Man. "I'm often called the father of Mega Man, but actually, his design was already created when I joined Capcom,". "My mentor (Akira Kitamura), who was the designer of the original Mega Man, had a basic concept of what Mega Man was supposed to look like. So I only did half of the job in creating him."

He again worked on Mega Man 2 as the game's director. He left Capcom during the development of Mega Man 3. He joined the game design company Takeru. There he directed a game called Cocoron which bore similarities to Mega Man.

Despite his retirement from game development in the 1990s, he announced his return to the profession in 2024, working with Brave Wave Productions; one project unrelated to the company's music releases is related to the Mega Man series. In June 2025, he started a Patreon-funded blog named Kitamura's Blueprints, detailing the development of Mega Man.

== Gameography ==
Year	Title	Role
1985	Section Z (Arcade)	Poster illustration
1986	Trojan (Arcade)	Character design
1986	Trojan (NES)	Director, sprite art
1987	Mega Man	Director, planner, character design
1988	Legendary Wings (NES)	Director, sprite art
1988	Mega Man 2	Director, planner, character design
1989	Willow	Director, planner, scenario
1991	Cocoron	Director, planner, character design, scenario
1991	Nostalgia 1907	Planning advisor
1992	Funky Jet	Director, planner, character design
1994	Virgin Dream	CG director, background art
1994	Nontan to Issho: KuruKuru Puzzle	Director, planner, graphic designer
1996	Zeiram Zone	Director, planner
