= Mega Man (character) =

Video game character

- Mega Man character
- Artwork of Mega Man from Mega Man 11
- First game: Mega Man (1987)
- Created by: Akira Kitamura
- Designed by: Akira Kitamura; Keiji Inafune
- Voiced by: English: Doug Parker (Captain N: The Game Master); Ian James Corlett (MM 1994 TV series); Gregory Smith (MM: Upon a Star ep. 1); Christopher Gray (MM: Upon a Star eps. 2-3); Ruth Marie Jarman (MM8); Cole Howard (MMPU); Chris Cason (Street Fighter X Tekken); Benjamin Diskin (MM11); Vincent Tong (MM: Fully Charged); Alkaio Thiele (Secret Level); Japanese: Hekiru Shiina (1993-1996); Ai Orikasa (1996-1998); Kaoru Fujino (1998-2000); Yumiko Kobayashi (MM Powered Up); Naoki Koshida (Street Fighter X Tekken); Ayaka Fukuhara (MM11 and MM12)

In-universe information
- Alias: The Blue Bomber
- Species: Robot Master
- Weapon: Mega Buster; Variable Weapons System

Mega Man, known as Rockman (Japanese: ロックマン, Hepburn: Rokkuman) in Japan, is the title character and the eponymous protagonist of the Mega Man series by Capcom. The character was created by Akira Kitamura for the first Mega Man game released in 1987, with artist Keiji Inafune providing detailed character artwork based on Kitamura's pixel art design.

In the original story, Mega Man is a humanoid robot created by Dr. Light as an assistant. When Light's colleague goes mad, Light repurposes Mega Man to battle the mad scientist Dr. Wily and his ever-growing army of robots, and stop them from taking over the planet by using their own special abilities against them. Utilizing his Mega Buster arm cannon and his ability to copy the special weapons of the boss robots he defeats, Mega Man must travel the world and traverse harsh environments in order to bring Wily's menace to an end. With the help of Dr. Light and his assorted cybernetic companions, Mega Man's eventual goal is to one day achieve everlasting peace for both humans and robots.

Mega Man has become one of Capcom's mascots, one of the company's primary original characters, and continues to be one of the video game industry's most recognizable icons. Having appeared on many consoles since the Nintendo Entertainment System, Mega Man has had a wide gaming audience. Mega Man's fictional universe can be divided into seven categories, each featuring different variations and incarnations of a robot boy hero. Although Rockman, or "Mega Man", is usually the name for the classic series, it can also be the Mega Man series of fictional works, or the group of adherently named main characters within.

The several spin-off series that have emerged over the past years, each one continuing the Mega Man storyline in some unique way, includes but is not limited to the Mega Man X, Mega Man Legends, Mega Man Battle Network, and Mega Man Star Force series. Mega Man has also appeared as a playable character in the Super Smash Bros. series. A resulting animated series was also produced originally in Japan as well as a number of toys, comics, and collectables available both in and outside Japan.

== Conception and design ==
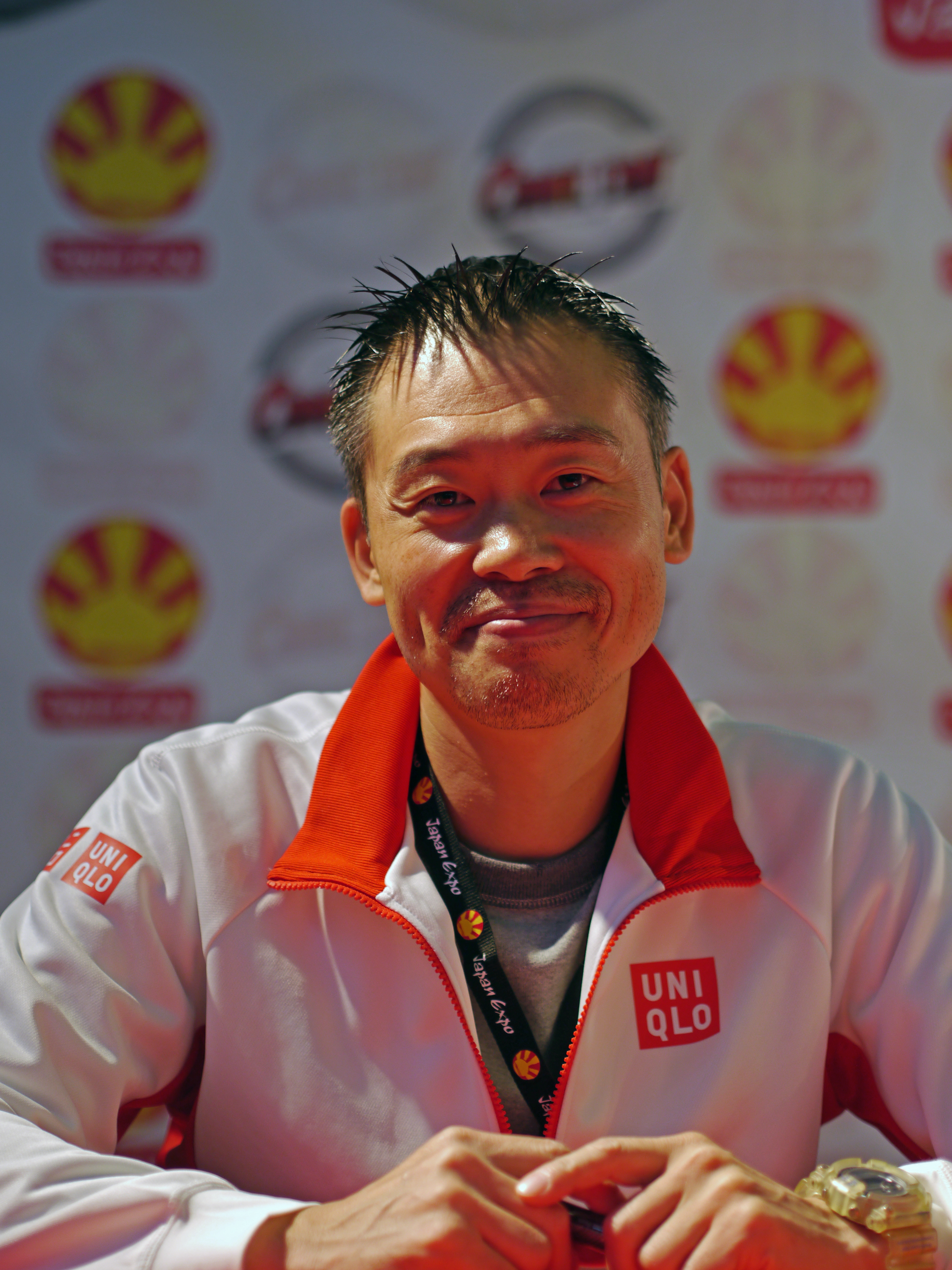
Keiji Inafune is commonly credited as "the father of Mega Man", though he views himself as a co-creator.

Although originally the names "Mighty Kid", "Knuckle Kid", and "Rainbow Battle Kid" were proposed, Capcom eventually settled on "Rockman". The word "Rock" in Rockman is a reference to the music genre rock and roll, and is meant to work in tandem with his sister robot, Roll. However, Capcom USA Consumer Products Division President Joe Morici localized the name from Rockman to "Mega Man" because he felt "The title was horrible." In addition, the original Mega Man titles intentionally incorporated a "Rock, Paper, Scissors" gameplay mechanic into defeating certain enemies. The pixel art for the character was created by the designer of the original game in the series, Akira Kitamura (credited under the pseudonym "A.K"), and later turned into a refined illustration by Keiji Inafune. Kitamura originally intended Mega Man to be colored white, but instead settled on blue to make his animations more clear. Mega Man's design had a lot of little influences from various manga, anime, and tokusatsu shows, specifically Ninja Captor. Nobuyuki Matsushima, lead programmer for the original game, came up with the idea for Mega Man changing colors when his weapons changed. Inafune also cited Astro Boy by Osamu Tezuka as a major influence for the character.

During a special event at TGS 2007, Inafune commented on the creation of Rockman. "I'm often called the father of Rockman, but actually, his design was already created when I joined Capcom," he explained. "My mentor (Capcom senior member Akira Kitamura), who was the designer of the original Rockman, had a basic concept of what Rockman was supposed to look like. So I only did half of the job in creating him. I didn't get to completely design a Rockman [protagonist] from scratch until Rockman X. Back when the Super Family Computer was coming out, I was asked to give Rockman a redesign, so I created this character. But I realized that this design wouldn't be accepted as Rockman, so I had another designer create the new Rockman, and I worked on Zero to release him as the 'other main character' that would steal all the good scenes!"

The team decided to incorporate anime elements for the game's animation. Inafune explained, "[Mega Man's] hand transforms into a gun and you can actually see it come out of his arm. We wanted to make sure that the animation and the motion was realistic and actually made sense. So with Rockman, we had this perfect blending of game character with animation ideas." Across the series Mega Man was given new skills to add more variety to the gameplay. For Rockman 6, after having implemented so many different mechanics to the gameplay of past entries, Inafune thought that Rush adapter assembly was inevitable. The artist struggled with the adaptor designs and ultimately found them to be unrealistic. According to Inafune, "If you think about it, they shouldn't be able to combine like this. It would be awkward if parts of Rush like his neck were left over after they combined, so what was I supposed to do?"

In the cover of the North American copies, Mega Man's appearance greatly differs from his original one. Veteran video game cover illustrator Marc Ericksen painted the North American box art of Mega Man 2, which included Mega Man firing a pistol instead of his trademark Mega Buster. Ericksen explained, "I didn't know anything about Mega Man, and [after looking at the character in action] I said to the art director, 'What is he shooting with?' ... He said, 'Well, he must have a pistol, because I don't see a rifle.' ... I said, 'So, a pistol? Do you want me to do a pistol?' And he said, 'Yeah, let's put a pistol in there.' So I did what I was told and I put the pistol in there. Add to the fact that they only had, like, a day and a half for me to do the painting and what you wound up with was not the greatest result. But certainly a result that was not my fault. I mean, they told me to put the pistol in his hand!"

Ruth Shiraishi, who voiced Mega Man in Mega Man 8, voiced X in Mega Man X4. Mega Man 8 and X4 were recorded in the same session and Ruth did not know her session was for two separate games. For X, Ruth believes that they altered her voice somewhat to sound a little older than Mega Man.

== Appearances ==
=== In Mega Man video games ===
Mega Man's most notable appearances have been within his own self-titled games, beginning with Rockman for the Family Computer in 1987. This, and all future Mega Man games released in North America and Europe, would bear the title "Mega Man" due to Capcom USA's early decision to change the name. Prior to decision on the name "Mega Man" which was proposed by Joseph Morici, Capcom had even considered the name "Rainbow Man" as a possible title due to the nature of Mega Man's color change when using different Robot Master weapons.

Mega Man's origins in the NES localization varied depending on how source material was handled globally. In the original release (Family Computer), he was built as a housekeeping robot to serve his creator, Dr. Right, but was later converted into a fighting robot upon urging his creator to do so. In the NES localization, he was co-created by Dr. Wily and his original purpose as to why he was built was never mentioned.

Nearly all of the classic series Mega Man titles have been two-dimensional sidescrollers involving horizontal movement through various levels. This mechanic continues even on titles developed for high performance platforms, such as the Sony PSP release of Mega Man Powered Up, which features 3D graphics, yet movement to both the background and foreground is restricted. The main series on both the NES and Game Boy would follow this approach in the design of every game developed on those systems, and set the standard for all platformer Mega Man games to come. Mega Man himself has evolved very little cosmetically since his initial release, but has often been given new techniques in each game. The New Mega Buster, for instance, which was introduced in Mega Man 4, allowed him to charge up a shot. The slide was introduced in Mega Man 3. It was these which were needed in order to help him exceed any new challenges added by the level designers. In Mega Man 9 and 10, Mega Man's abilities were restricted back to that of the original game. However, Mega Man can charge his shots again in Mega Man 11, and he gained the ability to increase its power and speed with the Double Gear System.

Capcom, recognizing Mega Man's versatility, has placed him in several different video game genres outside of his usual series. He has since been seen as a sports star in the Super NES game Mega Man Soccer, a race car driver in Mega Man Battle & Chase, and a board game piece in Wily and Right's RockBoard. A limited release arcade fighting game series containing Mega Man: The Power Battle and Mega Man 2: The Power Fighters pitted Mega Man against several boss characters from his original series.

Mega Man's appearance in Street Fighter X Tekken was based on rushed artworks for the North American ports of the franchise.

Though Capcom owns the rights to all Mega Man games and has been responsible for the development of all of his console titles, it has in the past licensed the Mega Man character to other companies for PC releases. Mega Man and Mega Man III were not ports of the NES games of the same name, but significantly different original games, and were developed by the US-based Hi Tech Expressions. The Mega Man game on the Game Gear was published by Sega. Rockman Strategy was developed and released exclusively in China by AcerTWP.

Mega Man was to have appeared in several iterations in the canceled Mega Man Universe. These included a redesigned Mega Man simply called 'Mega Man', the classic Keiji Inafune styled Mega Man referred to as 'Rock Man', and 'Bad Box Art Mega Man', who was based on the box-art featured on the North American version of the original Mega Man game. Mega Man makes another fighting game appearance in Street Fighter X Tekken but as an aged, obese depiction of the character on the North American box art of Mega Man, complete with pistol. Here he has the name "Mega Man" even in the original version. He was given the appearance of a middle aged man with short legs while Capcom also discarded the idea of costumes being more focused on the traditional games from the franchise. The concept of the design was making him as "cheap" as possible with the artist being a major fan of the character. The design was scrapped several times as early versions were seen as too cool, most notably his helmet.

=== In other games ===
Mega Man has made appearances in several game projects outside of his original series. He appears as a playable character in Marvel vs. Capcom and Marvel vs. Capcom 2 assisted by Rush and Beat as a representative of the Capcom brand. He has also been featured in the 3D shooter Cannon Spike, and the SNK vs. Capcom: Card Fighters digital collectible card games.

Non-playable cameo appearances by Mega Man occur most often in other Capcom licensed games, and he is often seen as a background character. Such appearances include Capcom World 2, Street Fighter Alpha 3, Marvel Super Heroes vs. Street Fighter, Pocket Fighter, Mighty Final Fight, Power Stone 2, Boktai, Boktai 2, Lunar Knights, The Misadventures of Tron Bonne, Onimusha Blade Warriors, and Tatsunoko vs. Capcom. Animated incarnations of Mega Man were common in the early 1990s, particularly in North America.

Mega Man also appears a playable guest character in some games from other developers. In Nintendo's Super Smash Bros. for Nintendo 3DS and Wii U and Super Smash Bros. Ultimate, Mega Man appears using movement and attacks based upon the gameplay and graphical style of the original Mega Man games. Mega Man could also be unlocked during a crossover event in Nintendo and Cygames' Dragalia Lost called "Mega Man Chaos Protocol", wherein he assists the protagonists in defeating Dr. Wily after they are transported to the game's world. Mega Man appears as a playable character in Sega's Sonic Racing: CrossWorlds via paid downloadable content.

=== In other media ===
Mega Man's first animated appearance was as a main character in the series Captain N: The Game Master, which features a myriad of characters that had appeared on Nintendo consoles up until that time. They all aid the title character, Captain N, in his quest to save the world of Videoland, encountering many villains, including Mega Man's own enemy Dr. Wily. Mega Man is voiced in this series by Doug Parker, and his character had a tendency to add the prefix "mega-" to words for emphasis. He also appeared in the animated Mega Man TV series, in which he is voiced by Ian James Corlett.

A three-episode Japanese anime OVA titled Mega Man: Upon a Star was produced in 1993 in an attempt to help spread information on Japanese culture. In it, Mega Man crosses paths with his adversary, Dr. Wily, while learning various facts about Japanese society, and receiving occasional help from Proto Man.

The story of Mega Man's origin and his bittersweet victory over the robotic forces of Dr. Wily has been adapted by the Protomen, a band from Tennessee who perform an original dystopian rock opera based on the dynamic between Mega Man and Proto Man. During the show, the band members wear costumes inspired by their take on the series, including motorcycle helmets with built-in microphones fashioned to look like those of Mega Man and Proto Man, and the iconic arm-blaster.

MegaRan performs a number of rap songs about Mega Man. In May 2010, a live action full feature film was released directed by Eddie Lebron. The film using a mix of CGI and people in extreme sport equipment for the fighting robots based itself on the first game with slight modifications to the story and character designs to work. The film can currently be viewed for free at its own website.

=== Archie Comics ===
In April 2011, Archie Comics released their first issue in an ongoing series of licensed comics based on the Mega Man franchise which features the titular character going against his nemesis Dr. Wily in various, original story arcs. The overall concept is created and almost exclusively written by Ian Flynn, who is also the current head writer for Archie Comics' other video game licensed comic series Sonic the Hedgehog. Consequently, as of May 2013, both series have been crossed-over in a major story arc called "Worlds Collide", which spans twelve issues between the Mega Man comics, the main Sonic the Hedgehog comics, and the latter's side-series Sonic Universe.

== Reception and legacy ==
Overall, the character of Mega Man has been well received by critics. IGN called him an icon of Capcom. Nintendo Power listed Mega Man as their fourth favourite hero, citing his ability to steal weapons from downed Robot Masters. Mega Man was also listed as the best robot in video games by many sources such Joystick Division, UGO Networks, and Complex. GameDaily ranked him as the best Capcom character of all time. UGO Networks listed Mega Man as one of their best heroes of all time, and called him "one of the most iconic video game heroes of all time". He was included in GameSpot's "All Time Greatest Video Game Hero" contest and reached the "Elite Eight" round before losing to Mario. In a Famitsu poll done in February 2010, Mega Man was voted by readers as the twenty-second most popular video game character. The 2011 Guinness World Records Gamer's Edition lists Mega Man as the 23rd most popular video game character. In 2012, GamesRadar ranked him as the 12th "most memorable, influential, and badass" protagonist in games. Electronic Gaming Monthly's reviewer found the Mega Man from Mega Man 2 to be better than the original, citing the improved audio-visuals and new power-ups. However, the character has been called out for being weak in several games.

Complex ranked him as having the tenth best fighting game cameos for his guest appearances in Street Fighter X Tekken in 2012. Joystick Division cited his rivalry with Dr. Wily as seventh of the ten greatest in video games, adding giving "great credit to this rivalry for its open-endedness" and GamesRadar listed him and Proto Man as having one of the best brotherly rivalries in gaming. The same site also said "Everyone loves Mega Man, but some fans prefer the bad boy style of his rival/ally Proto Man" as they deemed the latter as more stylish. UGO Networks have placed Mega Man as the eighth character who most deserves his own movie.

1UP.com described Mega Man as "Capcom's ill-treated mascot", and "one of the most incongruous characters of all time", saying "it wouldn't be completely incorrect to assume that the popularity of the series has almost nothing to do with Mega Man himself", but with "his rivals, his enemies, and their abilities." IGN agreed with his dependency on support characters, saying Zero is "cooler than Mega Man". Den of Geek listed Mega Man's incarnation from Street Fighter X Tekken as the 15th best cameo in fighting game history due to how it represented Capcom's lack of interest in featuring other games as of 2012, as well as the apparent self-mockery of it due to Mega Man's poor characterization. Destructoid described this Mega Man as "legit" stating it was "an unexpected and interesting creative decision by [Capcom] using this version of Mega Man to represent them in what may be one of their biggest games of 2012". Jeremy Parish of Polygon ranked 73 fighters from Super Smash Bros. Ultimate "from garbage to glorious", placing Mega Man at 23rd, stating that "most Smash Bros. brawlers are weirdos who probably don't even register as human. Even if Mega Man's presence here goes against his basic programming, it's great to see him reunited with his old pals Simon and Pit, just like in the Captain N days." Gavin Jasper of Den of Geek ranked Mega Man as 10th on his list of Super Smash Bros. Ultimate characters, stating "The games still hold up and the Blue Bomber remains one of video games' greatest icons. Including him in Smash is a no-brainer, but it's also rather important."

Numerous artists and bands performed all or part of the soundtrack on studio albums in the 2000s with references to Mega Man, including The NESkimos on Battle Perfect Selection (2002), Chromelodeon on Year 20XX (2003), The Minibosses on Brass (2005), Mega Ran on his self titled album (2007), and The Megas on Get Equipped (2008).

Several characters from the franchise were based on Mega Man. When the NES console began to be overshadowed by its successor, the Super NES, Capcom designer Keiji Inafune embraced the improved graphics engine and developed a darker plot and character design compared to the original Mega Man franchise. Inafune felt that the original title character was too wholesome and that his successor should have an "edge". To this end, he created two new characters for the new "X" series being developed: the main character, X, and his partner, Zero. Inafune's protégé, Hayato Kaji, credited as "Rippa H.K", illustrated the protagonist X but struggled with the initial design. It had a wider palette of colors available on the Super NES as compared to the NES. Toru Nakayama of Inti Creates would redesign Zero for the Mega Man Zero series. was meant to have a more "human feel" rather than the complete "mechanical feel" of the X series. Nakayama wanted the public to recognize that this series was different from the X series. Since Capcom wanted Zero's general structure to be the same, Inti-Creates concentrated on how different they could make him, rather than how similar. For the Mega Man Legends series, the new protagonist is Mega Man Voluntt who was designed to be different from all previous characters. Hayato Kaji was responsible for redesigning Mega Man as MegaMan.EXE for the Battle Network series. The character's initial concept art went through a large number of changes before it was finalized to a much simpler design, so that even very young fans could easily draw it.
