= Mega Man: Upon a Star =

2002 original video animation anime series based on Mega Man

- North American DVD cover

ロックマン 星に願いを (Rokkuman Hoshi ni Negai o)
- Genre: Action, adventure, comedy, educational, science fantasy
- Original video animation
- Directed by: Katsumi Minoguchi; Naoyoshi Kusaka (1)
- Produced by: Makoto Asabuki; Kenzo Tsujimoto; Akio Sakai; Toshiko Yamazaki; Toshihiko Satō
- Written by: Akira Okeya
- Music by: Kaoru Ōhori
- Studio: Ashi Productions
- Licensed by: NA: ADV Films
- Released: September 20, 2002
- Runtime: 30 minutes
- Episodes: 3

Mega Man: Upon a Star, known in Japan as Rockman: Hoshi ni Negai o (ロックマン 星に願いを; lit. 'Rockman: Wishing Upon a Star'), is a Japanese anime original video animation (OVA) series based on the Capcom video game franchise Mega Man. Produced by Universal Multimedia Entertainment, Capcom, and Ashi Productions, who also worked on the 1994 American Mega Man cartoon, and presented by the Japan Center for Intercultural Communications, it serves as a series of educational shorts about the culture of Japan. Produced around 1993 to 1994, the OVA was unreleased to home media up until a Japanese DVD release by Capcom on September 20, 2002. This was followed by a North American release by ADV Films on January 4, 2005, which switched the order of episodes 1 and 2 from the Japanese release. It loosely adapts the events of Mega Man 5 (1992), along with original story elements.

== Plot ==
In the early 1990s, Yuuta Kobayashi is a Japanese boy who plays the game Mega Man 5, but forgets to turn off his console before going to bed. This allows Mega Man, along with his friends and foes, to exit the "video game world", arriving in Japan in the "real world". As Dr. Wily attempts to conquer the real world, Mega Man teams up with the Kobayashi family to search for Dr. Wily, eventually finding him at an amusement park after Yuuta's father takes him to Tokyo. Dr. Wily orders the robots in a giant machine called Samurai Man; though Mega Man defeats it by Charge Kicking a football, Dr. Wily escapes. Yuuta summons Eddie to replenish Mega Man's energy before leaving with him and Rush to search Tokyo for Dr. Wily. Along the way, Mega Man learns about Japanese culture and customs, including the Japanese New Year, Setsubun, Hinamatsuri, and Children's Day. Eventually, they discover that Dr. Wily built a secret base inside Mount Fuji and used the volcanic energy to create Lava Man. Yuuta's sister Akane summons Proto Man and Beat to help Mega Man; while they confront the lava robots, Mega Man breaks into Wily's lab and defeats his Robot Masters. Though Wily flees in a rocket, Proto Man diverts his rocket to go back into Yuuta's video game; after celebrating Wily's defeat, the characters return to the game.

Some time later, Mega Man and Roll are pulled out of the game world by Yuuta and Akane and taken to the Obon matsuri. There, Mega Man and Yuuta carry the mikoshi in a parade, Roll learns about yukatas and makes a promise with Akane that she will wear a kimono on Shichi-Go-San, Mega Man learns about cotton candy, Roll plays Whac-A-Mole, and the kids watch the fireworks. While they are gone, Dr. Wily escapes the game world with his updated Skulker and kidnaps Proto Man. After Dr. Light repairs the time machine, Mega Man and Roll use it to travel forward one year in time, only to discover that Wily has conquered Japan and raised Tokyo above the surface. They then return to the past, where they discover that a typhoon caused by Dr. Wily and his new Typhoon Robot is responsible for this. While aiming to save Proto Man and Tokyo, Mega Man learns about Tsukimi and its dango, as well as Sports Day.

== Episode list ==
No.	Title	Original release date
1	"Appearance in Japan"; Transliteration: "Nihon jōriku" (Japanese: 日本上陸)	September 20, 2002
Following a fight with his family because he was playing Mega Man 5 late at night, Yuuta Kobayashi leaves the game paused overnight. As Mega Man and Dr. Wily are unable to settle their score in the game, Wily invades the real world with an army of robots, with Mega Man teaming up with Yuuta to stop him.
2	"Wishing Upon a Star"; Transliteration: "Hoshi ni negai o" (Japanese: 星に願いを)	September 20, 2002
In the game, Mega Man and Wily are fighting until Mega Man exits the game due to Yuuta and Akane fighting over the controller. Meanwhile, Wily, who had calmed down following Mega Man's disappearance, discovers a time machine in Dr. Light's laboratory.
3	"Future Beware"; Transliteration: "Mirai ga abunai" (Japanese: 未来が危ない)	September 20, 2002
Dr. Wily has developed a new type of mecha, the Skull Car, which surpasses Dr. Light's time machine. Meanwhile, Light rebuilds the time machine, which Mega Man and Roll use to travel back in time one year to the real world, only to discover that Wily has destroyed Tokyo.

== Voice cast ==
Character	Japanese	English
Mega Man	Hekiru Shiina	Gregory Smith (Ep. 1); Christopher Gray (Eps. 2-3)
Dr. Wily	Kenichi Ogata	Scott McNeil
Yuuta Kobayashi (小林 優太, Kobayashi Yūta)	Akiko Yajima (Ep. 1); Rie Iwatsubo (Eps. 2-3)	Brandon O'Bray (Ep. 1); Sean Amsing (Eps. 2-3)
Akane Kobayashi (小林 茜, Kobayashi Akane)	Yuri Shiratori	Kelly Sheridan
Mrs. Kobayashi	Sayuri Ikemoto	Kathleen Barr (Ep. 1); Cathy Weseluck (Eps. 2-3)
Mr. Kobayashi	Kenichi Ono	Campbell Lane
Dr. Light	Hiroshi Naka	Jim Byrnes
Roll	Satomi Kōrogi	Andrea Libman
Proto Man	Urara Takano	Kaj-Erik Eriksen
Rush	Wataru Takagi	Terry Klassen
Eddie	Katsumi Suzuki	Paul Dobson
Beat	—N/a	Scott McNeil

Additional voices were performed in English by Brent Chapman and David Kaye.

== See also ==
- Mega Man, a 1994 American animated series by Ruby-Spears Productions, with animation assistance by Ashi Productions. The connection is notable because Ashi was also the main animation production studio behind the Upon a Star OVA, Ruby-Spears served as the US production consultants for its English dub, both series shared some of the same English voice cast, and a pitch pilot for the 1994 TV series animated by Ashi shared a similar art style to Upon a Star
