= Mega Man Powered Up =

2006 video game

- European box art
- Developer: Capcom
- Publisher: Capcom
- Director: Kazuki Matsue
- Producer: Tatsuya Kitabayashi
- Designers: Hiroyuki Yamato; Yuujirou Hayakawa; Yusuke Tokita; Gentaro Tanzawa
- Artists: Keiji Inafune; Tatsuya Yoshikawa
- Composer: Toshihiko Horiyama
- Series: Mega Man
- Platform: PlayStation Portable
- Release: PlayStation Portable: JP: March 2, 2006; NA: March 14, 2006; EU: March 24, 2006; PlayStation Network: JP: December 16, 2009 - November 30, 2022
- Genre: Platform
- Mode: Single-player

Mega Man Powered Up (Note: known in Japan as Rockman Rockman (ロックマンロックマン)) is a 2006 platform game developed and published by Capcom. It was released for the PlayStation Portable (PSP) handheld game console in March 2006. It is a remake of the original Mega Man game, released in 1987 for the Nintendo Entertainment System (NES). Players control the eponymous star Mega Man, who must stop Dr. Wily from conquering the world using eight robots called Robot Masters.

The game uses a chibi art style that was intended for the original NES game but was not possible at the time. The designers intended to keep this design faithful to the way the characters worked and looked in the original. Unlike the original game, players can control these eight Robot Masters under the right circumstances. Other new features include a level creator mode and a challenge mode.

First revealed in 2005, Powered Up was released in a bundle alongside Mega Man Maverick Hunter X (also for PSP); in Japan, it was also released on the PSP's PlayStation Network (PSN) service. While it received positive reviews, the game sold poorly, especially in North America, and plans for a sequel and remake of Mega Man 2, titled Mega Man Powered Up 2, fell through.

== Plot ==
The robot creator Dr. Light created two human-like robots with advanced artificial intelligence named Rock and Roll. Following this, he created eight more robots intended for industrial use: Cut Man, Guts Man, Ice Man, Bomb Man, Fire Man, Elec Man, Time Man, and Oil Man. He received a Nobel Prize for Physics, and his old colleague and rival Dr. Wily has grown bitter for not being acknowledged for his work on the project. Wily discovered a prototype robot made by Dr. Light before Rock and Roll called Proto Man, who is in danger of having his energy generator go critical. Wily gave him a nuclear energy supply to extend his life. He later steals and reprograms the eight industrial robots to attempt world domination. Rock volunteered to stop Wily and rescue his friends, and Dr. Light converted him into a fighting robot, giving him a new name: Mega Man. After defeating all eight Robot Masters and returning them to normal, Mega Man goes through Dr. Wily's fortress and challenges him. After beating Wily, the mad scientist surrenders and asks Mega Man to spare him. Mega Man then returns home, where he's greeted by Dr. Light, Roll, and his friends.

== Gameplay ==
Mega Man Powered Up features updated visuals, a widescreen mode, and new Robot Masters.

The game is a remake of the original NES Mega Man title and has similar gameplay and level designs. The game moves on a 2D plane and players are given control of the game's eponymous hero Mega Man. Unlike the original's 8-bit graphics, the game uses 3D character models with chibi designs. Mega Man's primary abilities include jumping and shooting, and when certain conditions are met, can also use a sliding maneuver to dodge obstacles, or charge his Mega Buster for a more powerful shot. Mega Man can lose health by touching enemies or their projectiles, while lives will be lost when Mega Man touches spikes, or falls into a pit. Lives and health can be found either dropped by enemies or in fixed locations.

At the beginning of the game, players are given an introductory level and boss to overcome. Afterward, they are given access to eight different stages, each representing one of the above-mentioned Robot Masters. At the end of each stage, players must battle the Robot Master of that stage. When a Robot Master is defeated, he will relinquish to Mega Man their respective weapon, which can be used against other Robot Masters or enemies but has limited ammunition. If Mega Man defeats the Robot Master using his Mega Buster, the Robot Master will instead be brought back to his senses. This allows players to play through stages as one of the Robot Masters. In lieu of the missing Robot Master, an evil clone of Mega Man will be added to their respective spots and stages as a boss instead.

It features two styles of gameplay: "Old Style" is comparable to the NES version aside from the updated presentation, and "New Style" uses the PSP's entire widescreen and contains storyline cutscenes with voice acting, altered stage layouts, remixed music, and three difficulty modes for each stage. Additionally, the remake lets players unlock and play through the game as the eight Robot Masters, Roll, and Protoman. The New Style stages differ in structure from that of Old Style, with some pathways only accessible to specific Robot Masters. Mega Man Powered Up also features a Challenge Mode with 100 challenges to complete, a level editor for creating custom stages, and an option to distribute fan-made levels to the PlayStation Network online service.

== Development ==
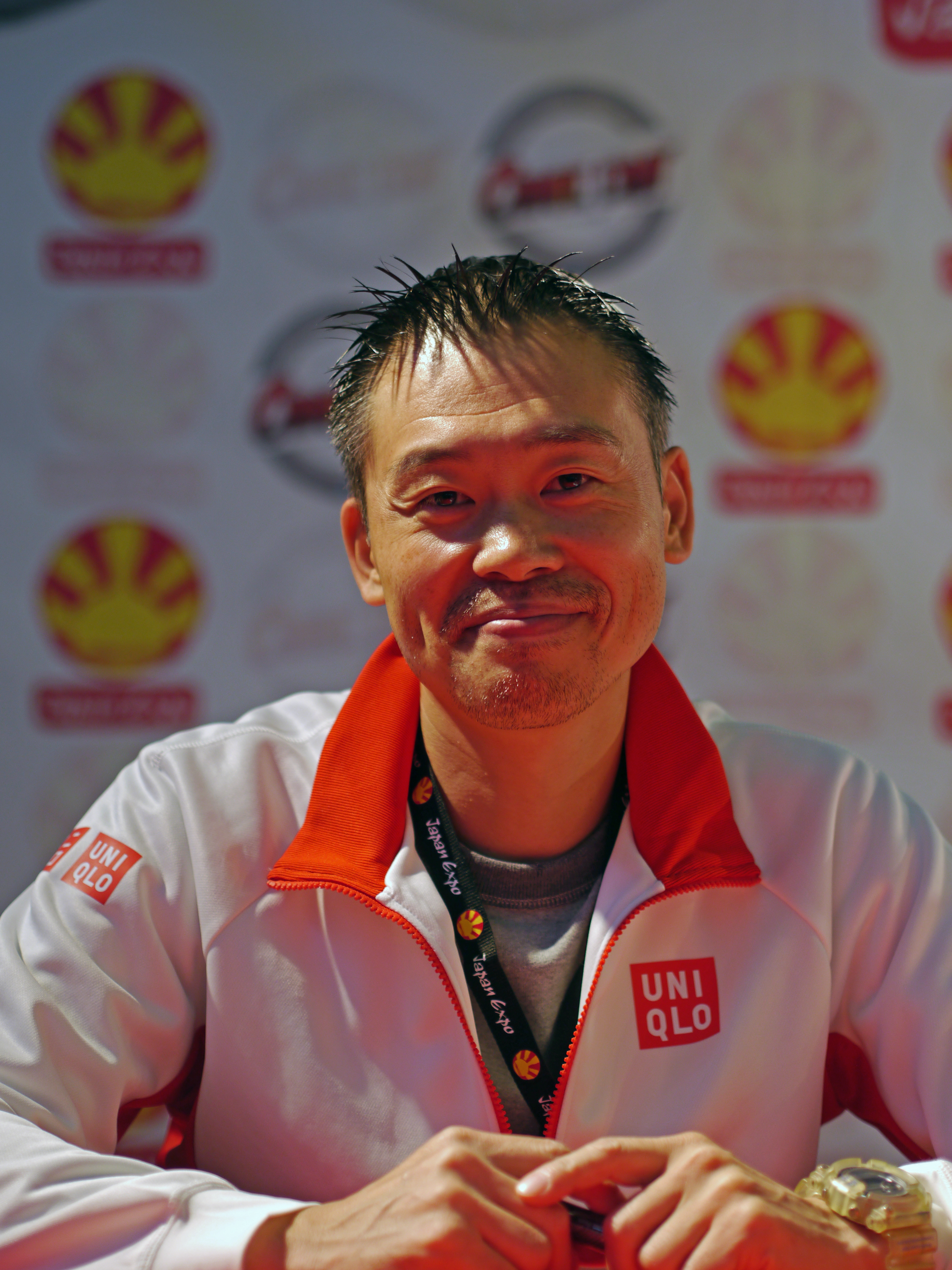
Keiji Inafune was a designer for both Powered Up and the original Mega Man.

Mega Man Powered Up was first seen on a list of games that would have demos at the 2005 Tokyo Game Show titled Rockman Rockman. It was later revealed to be a remake of the NES Mega Man. It was announced for a US release on November 8, 2005 under the title Mega Man Powered Up. A European release was also announced. It was bundled with Mega Man Maverick Hunter X on UMD. It was slated to be released on the PSP's PlayStation Network service, along with other Capcom PSP titles. While it was released for the Japanese PSN, it was never released on the service's US counterpart due to technical difficulties that neither Sony nor Capcom could resolve.

Keiji Inafune had originally planned to use the chibi art style for the original Mega Man, but could not due to the hardware constraints of the NES. Producer Tetsuya Kitabayashi stated that redesigning the character models was a result of the PSP's 16:9 widescreen ratio. The larger heads on the characters allowed the development team to create visible facial expressions. Character designer Tatsuya Yoshikawa explained the concept of the design was "toys" and be "Geared towards little kids ... the kinds of characters that you'd see hanging off of keychains and such". He added that the design team made sure proportions and movements were accurately reflected on the models. As the size of the remake's stages are not proportional to those of the original, the widescreen ratio also presented the developers with more space to fill. The Robot Master Oil Man originally had black skin and pink lips, which GamesRadar identified as a "1920s caricature." The design was changed for the US release to blue skin and yellow lips to avoid controversy.

== Reception ==
=== Pre-release ===
Mega Man Powered Up received generally positive reception after it was revealed. It was perceived initially as a "straight port" of the NES game with graphical enhancements. IGN writer Nix felt that the graphical update as seen at the 2005 Tokyo Game Show was well-designed. He noted that its biggest hang-up was the fact that the original Mega Man was improved upon by its sequels and that the original lacked functions such as the charge shot, the slide, and Rush. Jeff Gerstmann felt the game was promising and praised its take on the original levels as well as its level editor. Juan Castro felt that it would appeal to Mega Man fans and those looking for an "oldschool platformer."

=== Post-release ===
Reception

Aggregate scores
Aggregator	Score
GameRankings	83%
Metacritic	82/100

Review scores
Publication	Score
1Up.com	A−
Famitsu	29/40
GameSpot	8.5/10
GameSpy	5/5
GamesRadar+	4/5
IGN	8.2/10
PALGN	8/10

Sales of Mega Man Powered Up in Japan were considered very poor, though it sold better in the US. Speculation existed for the low sales which included the possibility that it came out too early in the PSP's life and a "lack of overlap between Mega Man gamers and PSP owners." Fan lamentation also existed for the fact that it was not available for the Nintendo DS (which featured several other Mega Man titles). Inafune expressed an interest in making a Mega Man Powered Up 2, though he noted that it would take time to get to. Due to the poor sales of the game, further remakes have been put on hold.

Despite poor sales, it received generally positive reviews, currently holding aggregate scores of 83% on GameRankings and 82 out of 100 on Metacritic respectively. It received positive attention from the Mega Man fanbase. Game Revolution's Mike Reily praised the game' variety of challenges, playable bosses, level editor, and the gameplay variety but criticized its "trial and error" gameplay and graphical slowdown. Gamasutra writer Connor Cleary praised its improvements of the original Mega Man and noted that those who do not love the art style would be able to get over it after playing. David Oxford, from 1UP.com felt that it was the most notable remake of the original Mega Man. In his review, Jeremy Parish, also from 1UP.com, called it "one of the most addictive PSP games to date" and felt that it reminded players of Mega Man's greatness. He also praised its level editor, which he noted came before future Sony titles that featured a level editor such as LittleBigPlanet and Sound Shapes. He later included it in his list of games to play on a short flight due to its quick levels and auto-save feature. GameSpot's Alex Navarro called it the best remake of the original Mega Man due to a combination of the original game's quality and the quality of the additional features, while IGN's Juan Castro felt that the quality and polish of the game would appeal to veteran Mega Man fans and newcomers to the franchise. Detroit Free Press called it "a must-buy for fans of the long-running series, despite its super cute-ified new look." Matt Keller from PALGN called the original an "all-time classic" and felt that Powered Up was "the remake it deserves."

GameSpy placed Powered Up as the seventh best handheld game of 2006, as well as the fifth best PSP game. IGN ranked it the ninth best PSP game ever made. It was also nominated for "Best Action Game" for the "2006 1UP Awards", losing to another Capcom game Dead Rising.
