= Takeru (company) =

Japanese video game company

Takeru Co., Ltd.
- Trade name: Takeru
- Native name: 株式会社タケル
- Romanized name: Kabushiki gaisha Takeru
- Type: Kabushiki gaisha
- Industry: Video games
- Defunct: 1994; 32 years ago
- Fate: Bankruptcy
- Headquarters: Taitō, Tokyo
- Area served: Japan
- Products: Video games
- Subsidiaries: Sur Dé Wave

Takeru, also known as Sur Dé Wave, was a Japanese video game developer.

== History ==
Takeru published Cocoron, developed by K2 in 1991. The game was directed by Akira Kitamura, creator of the Mega Man series. A port of Cocoron to the PC Engine, titled PC Cocoron was announced, however, it was unreleased.

Takeru's 1991 adventure game Nostalgia 1907 sold poorly, and financially hurt the company.

Takeru developed Little Samson, which was published by Taito.

As Sur dé Wave they also released a Game Boy car adapter power cable and a game controller by the name of Mega Blaster.

== Games ==
Year	Title(s)	Original platform(s)	Developer(s)	Publisher(s)	Ref.
1991	Nostalgia 1907	X68000, Mega-CD, PC-98, FM Towns	Takeru	Sur Dé Wave	
1991	Cocoron	Family Computer	K2	Sur Dé Wave	
1992	Little Samson	Nintendo Entertainment System	Takeru	Taito	
1992	Presence	PC-98, FM Towns	Great	Sur Dé Wave	
1992	Dennō Shōjo Rejection	FM Towns	Techno Grard	Sur Dé Wave	
1993	Hard Shot	PC-98	Takeru	Sur Dé Wave	
1993	The Golem Master	PC-98	Great, Green System	Sur Dé Wave	

=== Cancelled ===
Title(s)	Notes	Platform(s)	Developer(s)	Publisher	Ref.
Imperial Force	Conversion of the PC-98 original	PC Engine Super CD-ROM²	SystemSoft	Sur Dé Wave	
PC Cocoron	Conversion of the Famicom game Cocoron	PC Engine Super CD-ROM²	Takeru	Sur Dé Wave	
Pop'n Land	Conversion of the Famicom game Cocoron	Mega-CD	Takeru	Sur Dé Wave	
Presence: Nostalgia II	Sequel to Nostalgia 1907 for the Mega-CD	Mega-CD	Takeru	Sur Dé Wave	
