= The Megas (band) =

American video game cover band

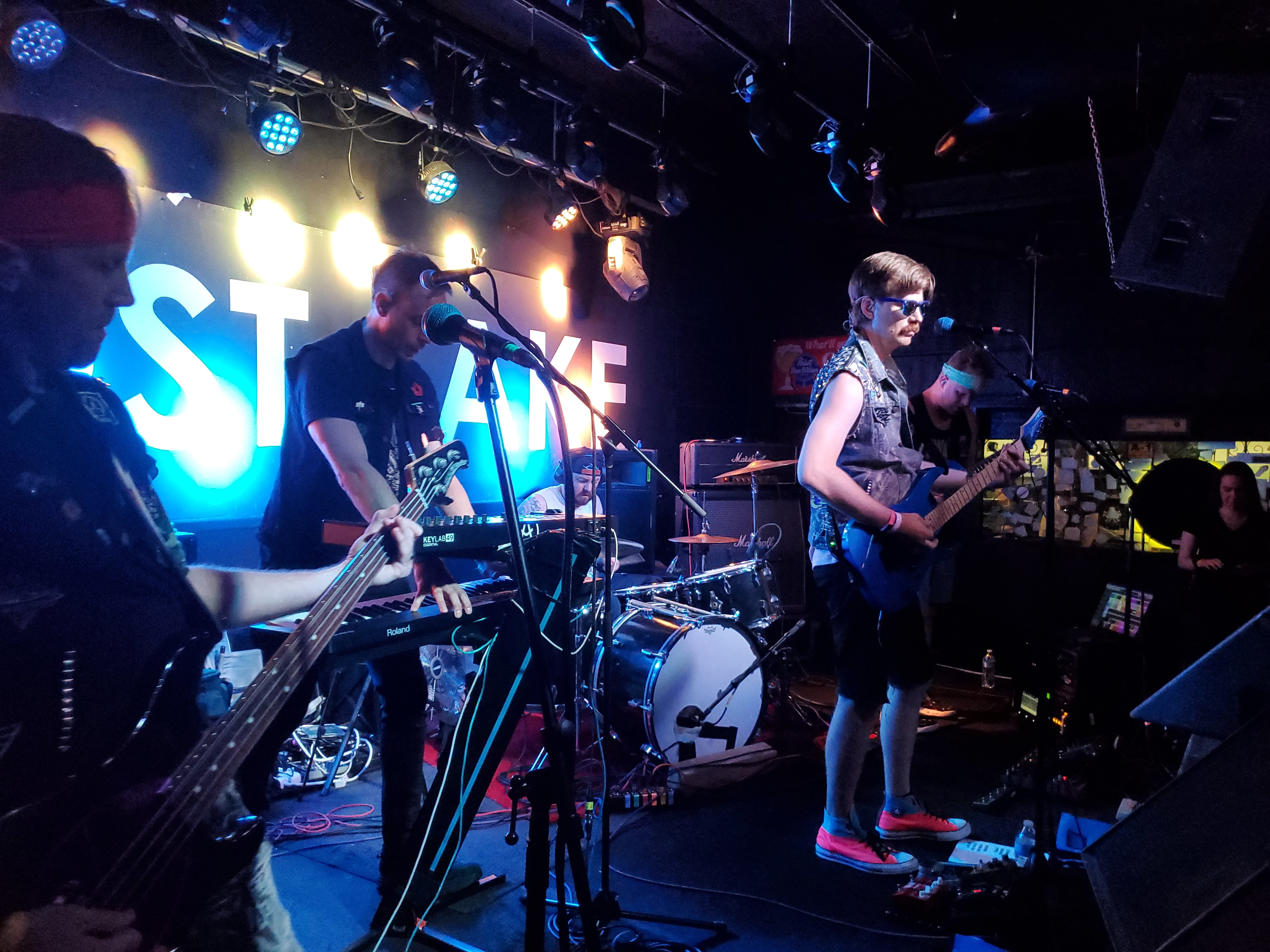

Background information
- Origin: Los Angeles, California
- Genres: Rock; indie rock; electronic rock; experimental rock; video game music
- Years active: 2004–present
- Label: Dr. Light Records
- Members: Josh "Rev. Breeding" Breeding; Eric "E" von Doymi; Greg "Gregatron" Schneider; Brian "Double D" DiDomenico; Greg "Church" Herschleb
- Past members: Mike "Mikey Hell" Levinson; Brent Firestone; Dave Jensen
- Website: Official website

The Megas, sometimes performing as The Belmonts, are a Los Angeles-based independent video game cover band. They are primarily known for their work based on Capcom's Mega Man franchise, but from 2016 onwards have also covered tracks from Konami's Castlevania series. They differentiate themselves from other artists in the scene by adding lyrics and blending original material with the games' melodies. The band gained initial popularity through Newgrounds and MySpace in the late 2000s, as well as their live performances at MAGFest, Nerdapalooza, and the Video Games Live tour. Capcom has occasionally promoted the group, and used their material to market Mega Man Universe in 2010.

== History ==
=== Formation and Get Equipped (2004–2008) ===
Josh Breeding arranged and performed a version of the song "I Want to be The One" (based on the Dr. Wily 1-2 theme) for a school talent show in 2004. Later, he played the song for Eric von Doymi, a friend that he met at Cal State Long Beach. The two of them re-recorded the track and the band formed shortly after, picking up bassist Greg Schneider (previously of the band Agent 51) and drummer Dave Jensen. The first songs were laid out and performed live at video game themed shows and local venues, but the band continued as a side project for a couple of years up until the recording of their first official album, Get Equipped. Drummer Mike Levinson, who previously played in Agent 51 with Schneider, joined the band, taking the place of second drummer Brent Firestone.

The band constructed a studio, dubbed "Dr. Light Studios", and then focused on recording and releasing their first album, Get Equipped, which was released in January 2008. Their lyrics expand on the simple story laid out in the games, giving each of the 8 Robot Masters a unique personality. Get Equipped includes an arrangement with original elements that turns the character select theme—originally only a few seconds long—into a full-length song titled "The Message From Dr. Light." Ironically, this song was later turned back into an NES chiptune by Inverse Phase and titled "The NESsage from Dr. Light." The track was quickly endorsed by The Megas and used as bonus material with online orders.

=== Megatainment, Get Acoustic, and work with brentalfloss (2009–2010) ===
In 2009 on the band's official Facebook page, it was stated that there is a "Mega Man 3 album coming soon." In June of the same year, Breeding announced via Facebook that the band is now recording. In July, the band announced via their official MySpace that they would be handing out free download cards at Comic-Con for two songs off Get Equipped and two songs from the upcoming Get Acoustic acoustic remix of Get Equipped. On August 24, 2009, The Megas released the Megatainment EP, a Mega Man 1 based collaborative EP with the band Entertainment System. In an interview in October 2009, the band said their next projects include Mega Man 3, Mega Man X, and Mega Man 9 albums. The band was originally set to be a part of the Mega Man 9 soundtrack, but the project never got past the concept stage. On February 4, 2010, The Megas released Get Acoustic digitally and stated they will head back to the studio to work on their Mega Man 3 follow-up to Get Equipped.

In April 2010, The Megas were featured on brentalfloss's album What If This CD...Had Lyrics?. brentalfloss added his lyrics to the instrumental breaks of The Megas' song "I Want To Be The One/Dr. Wily", as well as harmonizing with their original vocals at a few key points to create a new track entitled "Gotta Run/Be the One."

=== History Repeating (2010–2016) ===
While the band was hard at work on their Mega Man 3 album, they released a single as a preview for the album, titled Sparked A War, at Nerdapalooza and released it online soon after. The CD features the band's first single from their Mega Man 3 album (their rendition of Sparkman, "You've Sparked A War"), as well as a few b-sides. In October, the band released their music video for "You've Sparked a War."

In September 2010, two gameplay trailers of the now-cancelled game Mega Man Universe were released featuring The Megas music in the background. The first of which has "The Message from Dr. Light/Level Select" and the second has "Lights Out." A third, longer version of the same trailer was shown in the 2010 Tokyo Game Show featuring "You've Sparked a War."

The band announced they would be playing Video Games Live on June 8, 2011 and the 2011 Penny Arcade Expo. Drummer Mike Levinson announced in January 2012 that he would be making a solo album and funding it through Kickstarter where he also mentioned that the Mega Man 3 album would be named History Repeating. The band announced on June 8, 2012, that they would be releasing a double album for History Repeating, with the first album History Repeating: Blue to be released on June 18, 2012.

On June 28, Mike Levinson announced he would be leaving the band in order to go back to college. The band have confirmed they would not do full music albums from Mega Man 4 or Mega Man 5.

The second History Repeating album, History Repeating: Red was released on May 13, 2014. Like Blue, it was preceded by a preview album, Fly On A Dog, released in December 2012, featuring the band's first single from Red (based on the Mega Man 3 stage select music), as well as a few B-sides. When placed in a pyramid, the album artwork from History Repeating: Blue, History Repeating: Red, and Fly On A Dog combined to form an image of Gamma, the final boss of Mega Man 3.

An EP entitled The Quick and the Blue was released in 2016, which featured two songs from Get Equipped, which were re-recorded and featured additional synthesizers in the style of the History Repeating albums.

=== The Belmonts (2016–present) ===
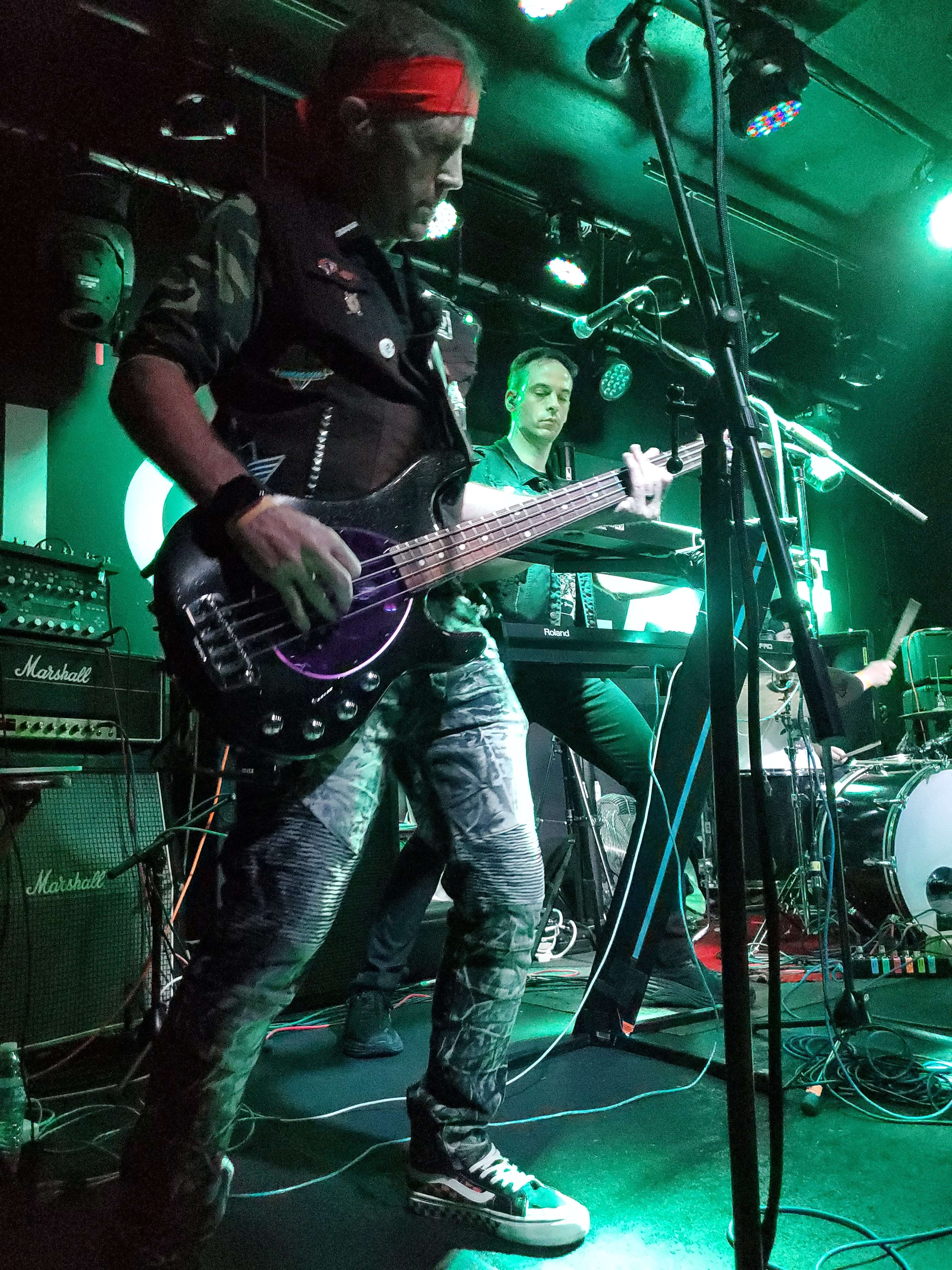
The Megas performing at Lost Lake Lounge in Denver, CO on August 26 2023.

The band decided to begin covering Castlevania tracks, and faced a debate about whether or not they should change the name of the group. They elected not to fully change the name, as they believed that it would make things confusing. In September 2016, the band released a three-song EP under the name The Belmonts, featuring covers of Bloody Tears, Heart Of Fire, and Out Of Time from the Castlevania series. The description on Bandcamp positions The Belmonts tracks as being older recordings by another group "discovered" by The Megas.

In an interview on the Rhythm and Pixels podcast in March 2018, the idea of themed albums or EPs was raised, such as an album of water-themed foes. Josh Breeding indicated that Skull Man was one of the most frequently requested characters and that it would be difficult to fit Skull Man into a themed album. That October, the band debuted a surprise Halloween-themed EP as a collaboration between The Megas and The Belmonts titled Skulls, featuring covers of "Skull Man Stage" from Mega Man 4, "Burn" by the Cure, and "Wicked Child" and "Vampire Killer" from Castlevania, the latter of which features guest vocals by Amanda Lepre of Andrew W.K.

On December 17, 2018, the band released a surprise Christmas-themed single titled "Chill Xmas", a cover of "Chill Penguin Stage" from Mega Man X and their first foray into the Mega Man X series, with a parody cover of "Blue Christmas" by Elvis Presley as a B-side.

On March 2, 2020, the band released a second Megas/Belmonts collaboration EP, titled Snakes, featuring a cover of "Stalker" from Castlevania, a new recording of "Evolution of Circuitry", "Rogumer Storm", a cover of "Storm Eagle Stage" from Mega Man X, and a cover of "Yours Truly, 2095" by Electric Light Orchestra. On October 27, 2024, the band released a new single entitled "Forever Halloween", featuring the titular track (a cover of Shade Man's stage theme from Mega Man 7) and a cover of (Every Day Is) Halloween by Ministry.

On July 11, 2025, the Megas became the first solely musical act to perform at Summer Games Done Quick, a Speedrunning charity marathon supporting Médecins Sans Frontières which was live streamed on Twitch.

== Musical style ==
The original music from Mega Man 2 is an 8-bit format from the NES. The Megas use guitar, bass guitar, keyboard piano, and drums to create songs inspired by the original themes of each boss stage, as well as other soundtrack selections such as the enemy selected music and the ending song music. In an interview with the Rhythm and Pixels podcast, Josh Breeding discussed the band's process, which involves taking the different layers to a track apart and considering where each loop of melody would have moved on to if it had been longer. Original lyrics are created for the songs, typically centered around each of the Robot Masters' personalities, made up based on their level design and their appearance.

== Band members ==
=== Current members ===
- Josh "Rev. Breeding" Breeding — vocals, guitar (2008–present)
- Eric "E" von Doymi — vocals, guitar (2008–present)
- Greg "Gregatron" Schneider — bass, backing vocals (2008–present)
- Brian "Double D" DiDomenico — keyboards (2011–present)
- Greg "Church" Herschleb — drums (2012–present)

=== Former members ===
- Mike "Mikey Hell" Levinson — drums (2008–2012)

== Discography ==
=== Studio albums ===
- Get Equipped (2008)
- History Repeating: Blue (2012)
- History Repeating: Red (2014)

=== EPs ===
- Megatainment (2009) with Entertainment System
- Sparked a War (2010)
- Fly on a Dog (2012)
- The Belmonts (2016)
- Skulls (2018)
- Snakes (2020)

=== Remix albums ===
- Get Acoustic (2010)

=== Demos ===
- Demo Get (2008)

=== Singles ===
- "Scent Blasters" (2013)
- "The Quick and the Blue (enhanced edition)" (2016) from MM25: Mega Man Rocks
- "Man on Fire (enhanced edition)" (2016) from MM25: Mega Man Rocks
- "I'm Not The Breakman (Street Cleaner Remix)" (2018) with Street Cleaner
- "Chill Xmas" (2018)
- "Forever Halloween" (2024)

=== Music videos ===
- "You've Sparked a War" (2010)
- "Gotta Run/Be the One" (2011)

=== Other appearances ===
Year	Artist	Song	Release
2008	Random feat. The Megas	"Boss Battle (MetalMan)"	Mega Ran
2008	The Megas	"The Message from Dr. Light/Level Select"	Released on a video game band compilation
2010	brentalfloss feat. The Megas	"Gotta Run/Be the One"	What If This CD...Had Lyrics?
2010	The Megas	"I Want to Be the One/Dr. Wily 1-2"	Featured in the fan movie Mega Man directed by Eddie Lebron.
2010	The Megas	"Lamentatons of a War Machine/End Song"	Featured in the fan movie Mega Man directed by Eddie Lebron.
2010	The Megas	"The Message from Dr. Light/Level Select"	Trailers for Mega Man Universe
2010	The Megas	"Lights Out"	Trailers for Mega Man Universe
2010	The Megas	"You've Sparked a War"	Trailers for Mega Man Universe
2011	Random feat. The Megas	"Metal Dance feat. The Megas (Acoustic Mix)"	Mega Ran's Bonuses

== See also ==
- Video game music culture
