= Cocoron =

1991 video game

- Famicom box artwork
- Developer: K2
- Publisher: Sur Dé Wave
- Director: Akira Kitamura
- Programmers: Akihito Ohta; Tsukasa Chibana
- Artists: Kiyoshi Utata; Shinichi Yoshimoto; Takehiko Tamada
- Composers: Takashi Tateishi; Yoshiji Yokoyama
- Platform: Family Computer
- Release: JP: May 3, 1991
- Genre: Platform
- Mode: Single-player

Cocoron (Note: Japanese: ココロン, Hepburn: Kokoron) is a 1991 action-platform video game developed by K2 and published by Sur Dé Wave for the Family Computer. It was the final game to be developed by Akira Kitamura, creator of the Mega Man series at Capcom, before his retirement until 2024. A version for the PC Engine was announced, but was not released.

== Gameplay ==
Gameplay screenshot

Cocoron is a side-scrolling action game. It features full character customization, allowing players to build a character from a toy box filled with spare parts.

== Development ==
Cocoron was directed by Akira Kitamura, who had previously designed the character Mega Man. Kitamura had left Capcom to form the company Takeru. The score was created by Takashi Tateishi, who also did the music to Mega Man 2. According to Tateishi, Kitamura requested "more cutesy" music for the game than previous titles. The artist for the game was Takashi "Utata Kiyoshi" Kogure.

Capcom wanted to release Mega Man 3 to market before Cocoron, and they refused to delay the title despite internal problems of production.

== Release ==
The game was released in Japan on May 3, 1991.

A port of the game to the PC Engine, titled PC Cocoron was announced, and was previewed in various magazines, including Weekly Famitsu, and Console Plus #28. Ultimately however, it was not released, and a copy of PC Cocoron is in the possession of the Game Preservation Society.

== Reception ==
Reception

Review scores
Publication	Score
Famitsu	7/10, 6/10, 7/10, 6/10
Hippon Super!	8/10

Japanese gaming magazine Famitsu had its four reviewers score the game 7, 6, 7, and 7.

Family Computer Magazine readers voted to give it a 19.7 out of 30 score.
