= Nostalgia 1907 =

1991 video game

- Mega-CD cover art
- Developer: Takeru
- Publisher: Sur Dé Wave
- Director: Kouichi Yotsui
- Producer: Nobukazu Watanabe
- Programmer: Takashi Yoshikawa
- Artist: Utata Kiyoshi
- Composer: Yukie Marikawa
- Platforms: X68000, Mega-CD, PC-98, FM Towns Marty
- Release: X68000: JP: 1991; Mega-CD: JP: December 14, 1991; PC-9801: JP: December 20, 1991; FM Towns: JP: 1992
- Genre: Adventure
- Mode: Single-player

Nostalgia 1907 (Note: Japanese: ノスタルジア１９０７, Hepburn: Nosutarujia 1907) is a 1991 adventure video game developed by Takeru and published by its label Sur Dé Wave. Originally released for the X68000, it was ported to the FM Towns Marty, PC-9801, and Sega Mega-CD. The player assumes the role of a passenger aboard a cruise liner named the Nostalgia that has been taken captive by a criminal looking for an artifact.

After completing Cocoron for the Famicom, Takeru set out to make their next game much more ambitious and story-centric. It was designed by Kouichi Yotsui, who previously created Strider for Capcom. He chose to make the game a text-based adventure as he was a fan of the genre and felt it made for a much more engaging experience compared to the arcade games he was accustomed to. Inspiration for the game was taken from the 1974 film The Juggernaut, as well as real-world events such as the Industrial Revolution, and various American spy novels and comic books.

Though Nostalgia 1907 received praise for its ambition and unique cinematic atmosphere, critics disliked its dialogue for being awkward and its lack of player interactivity making it boring to play. It was a commercial failure, putting Takeru in an unrecoverable financial crisis shortly after its release. The game has since received a cult following.

== Gameplay ==
The player interacts with a detective aboard the Nostalgia cruise liner.

Nostalgia 1907 is a text-based adventure video game. Gameplay is accomplished through dialogue trees and interacting with those aboard the Nostalgia, such as conversing with them or playing card games. Speaking with other characters can sometimes provide hints used to progress through the game or to solve puzzles, such as unlocking doors or getting access to a normally unreachable area. Some characters will provide the player with several decisions, which can have drastic effects on later portions of the game. Graphics are done entirely in sepia tones.

The game's bomb defusal scenes are believed to have had an influence on Hideo Kojima's Policenauts, which features a similar destruction sequence.

== Plot ==
The story takes place in the year 1907, shortly after the Russo-Japanese war. The story follows Kasuke Yamada, a Japanese man aboard a luxury cruise liner named the Nostalgia during its voyage in the northern Atlantic Ocean. A bomb is detonated and cripples the vessel; the perpetrator reveals himself and requests that he is given an artifact called the Russian Fog, held somewhere within the ship, or a second bomb will be detonated that will sink the ship and kill everybody on board. As the bomb fragments are revealed to be of Japanese origin Yamada is immediately suspected and Yamada must prevent the perpetrator from detonating the second bomb and rescue everybody aboard the ship.

== Development and release ==
After completing their first game Cocoron for the Famicom, Takeru set out to make their next game much more ambitious and story-centric. Directing the project was Kouichi Yotsui, who had previously created the arcade game Strider for Capcom. Yotsui wanted the game to be a text-based adventure, as he was a fan of the genre and felt it made for a much longer, more engaging experience than the arcade games he was accustom to. He chose the X68000 computer as the system the game would be developed for as the president of Takeru was a fan of it, which made it easier for him to get the project approved. Yotsui does not remember the reason he specifically chose the "retro" 1907 setting, saying that it simply came to him while brainstorming ideas.

The storyline was heavily influenced by American spy novels and comic books, as well as real-world events such as the Industrial Revolution. The 1974 film The Juggernaut was the inspiration for the game's infamous bomb defusal scenes, as Yotsui thought it would make for an excellent game idea. The Juggernaut also served as inspiration for some of the player character's dialogue, which Yotsui claims to be "inheriting culture". Yukie Marikawa composed the soundtrack for the game, and Utata Kiyoshi designed the game's backgrounds, characters and artwork. Marikawa wrote so much music for the game that her boss became disgruntled at Yotsui for making her work so much.

Nostalgia 1907 was released in early 1991 for the X68000. Versions for both the Mega-CD and PC-88 were released on December 14, and December 20, 1991 respectively, followed by a 1992 FM Towns Marty conversion. The Sega CD version contains full voice acting and music. Nostalgia 1907 was a commercial failure for Takeru, placing them in a financial crisis shortly after its release. Feeling partly responsible for the game's underwhelming performance, Kouichi Yotsui left Takeru to join Mitchell Corporation, where he helped design games such as Chatan Yarakuu Shanku and Cannon Dancer. Despite its failure, Nostalgia 1907 has garnered a small following its release and is considered a cult classic.

== Reception ==
Reception

Review scores
Publication	Score
Famitsu	25/40
Beep! MegaDrive	7.25/10

Reception for Nostalgia 1907 was mostly mixed. Famitsu said that the game had very little interactivity aside from the bomb defusal sequence, which provided a somewhat boring and dull experience. Beep! MegaDrive felt that while the game had clear ambition and a unique atmosphere it was hampered by awkward dialogue and a large lack of player input, alongside strange puzzle solving and cutscenes that dragged on for too long at times. They also said that the decision making was strange and poorly designed, claiming it felt unrealistic and lacked any sort of challenge. Later in 1995, Sega Saturn Magazine listed it among the 230 best Sega console games of all time based on reader vote.

In a more positive retrospective review, Play Magazine said that the unique atmosphere and mood made Nostalgia 1907 an interesting title in the text-based adventure game genre. They also liked the storyline, saying it was worth investing time into if the player had any knowledge of Japanese.
