= Mega Man (1987 video game) =

NES/Famicom action-platform video game

- Japanese cover art by Keiji Inafune
- Developer: Capcom
- Publisher: Capcom
- Director: Akira Kitamura
- Producer: Takashi Nishiyama
- Programmer: Nobuyuki Matsushima
- Artists: Yasuaki Kishimoto; Naoya Tomita; Keiji Inafune; Akira Kitamura
- Composer: Manami Matsumae
- Series: Mega Man
- Platforms: Nintendo Entertainment System; PlayStation; Mobile phone (BREW); Android; iOS
- Release: December 17, 1987: Famicom / NES; JP: December 17, 1987; NA: December 1987; EU: December 13, 1989 PlayStation; JP: August 5, 1999 Mobile phone; NA: September 20, 2004; JP: June 1, 2007 Android, iOS; WW: January 5, 2017
- Genre: Platform
- Mode: Single-player

Mega Man (Note: Known in East Asia as Rockman (ロックマン, Rokkuman)) is a 1987 platformer game developed and published by Capcom for the NES/Famicom. The first installment in the Mega Man franchise and the original video game series, Mega Man was produced by a small team specifically for the video game console market, a first for Capcom, which up until that point focused on arcade games. It was directed by Akira Kitamura, with Nobuyuki Matsushima as the lead programmer.

The game follows the humanoid robot, Mega Man and his quest to save the world from Dr. Wily and the six "Robot Masters" under his control. Mega Man's nonlinear gameplay lets the player choose the order in which to complete its initial six robot master stages. Each culminates in a boss fight against one of the Robot Masters that awards the player-character a special weapon. Part of the strategy of the game is that the player must choose the order in which to tackle the stages so that they can earn the weapons that will be the most useful for the future stages.

Critics praised Mega Man for its overall design. Mega Man established many of the gameplay, story, and graphical conventions that would define the ensuing sequels, sub series, and spin-offs in the Mega Man series. The game has since been re-released in game compilations such as Mega Man Legacy Collection, ported to iOS/Android, and became a part of console emulation services. A sequel, Mega Man 2, was released 1 year later in Japan and 2 years later in the US. A remake with 3D graphics, titled Mega Man Powered Up/Rockman Rockman, was released for the Sony PSP in 2006.

== Plot ==
In the year 200X, robots developed to assist mankind are commonplace thanks to the efforts of the renowned robot designer, Dr. Wright. However, one day, these robots go out of control and start attacking humans, and among them, there are six advanced humanoid robots created by Dr. Wright for industrial purposes. Known as the "Robot Masters", they consist of Cut Man, Guts Man, Ice Man, Bomb Man, Fire Man, and Elec Man. Dr. Wright realizes that the culprit responsible for these attacks is his old rival Dr. Wily, but is unsure of what to do. His helper robot, Rock, has a strong sense of justice and offers to be converted into a fighting robot to stop Dr. Wily's plans, dubbing himself Mega Man. He eventually defeats all six Robot Masters and recovers their central cores, then confronts Dr. Wily within his Pacific-based robot factory, where he is manufacturing copies of Dr. Wright's robots. After defeating replicas of Dr. Wright's Robot Masters, and several robot masters designed specifically by Wily to defeat him, Mega Man confronts Wily in a final showdown and defeats him before returning home to his family.

The initial Western release of the game has the same plot, and some significantly changed details from the Japanese Famicom manual. In this version, Dr. Wright and Dr. Wily (who is portrayed as Dr. Wright's former assistant) co-create the humanoid robot Mega Man alongside the six Robot Masters, each of whom were designed for the benefit of Monsteropolis's citizens (no such place existed in the original plot). Dr. Wily, angered by Wright taking credit for their work and desiring to use his creations for criminal purposes, steals the Robot Masters and modifies them, then creates his own army of robots to seize control of Monsteropolis and declare it his own personal empire. Dr. Wright, horrified by Dr. Wily's betrayal, sends Mega Man to destroy the Robot Masters and free Monsteropolis from Dr. Wily's machines.

== Gameplay ==
Mega Man traverses through Cut Man's stage. The player's score is at the top of the screen, and Mega Man's health gauge is on the top-left corner.

Mega Man consists of six side-scrolling platform levels freely chosen by the player. In each level, the player-character, Mega Man, fights through various enemies and obstacles before facing a "Robot Master" boss at the level's end. Upon defeating the boss, the player assimilates the Robot Master's signature attack, or "Special Weapon", into Mega Man's arsenal for the rest of the game. Unlike the standard Mega Buster (Rock Buster in Japan), the Robot Masters powers have limited ammunition replenished by collecting ammunition cells dropped by defeated enemies at random. Enemies also drop energy cells that replenish Mega Man's health gauge. Though the player is free to proceed through the game in any order, each Robot Master is especially vulnerable to a specific weapon, which encourages the player to complete certain stages before others. The player can also revisit cleared levels (except for Wily levels). Besides the weapons taken from the Robot Masters, the player is able to pick up a platform generator item known as the "Magnet Beam" in Elec Man's stage.

Mega Man features a scoring system where players can score points for defeating enemies, and earn extra points for collecting power-ups from fallen enemies and for clearing each stage. Each Robot Master was worth a random number between 50,000 and 100,000 points whereas Dr. Wily was always worth 200,000 points. The scoring system was removed in later Mega Man games as it was found to provide no meaningful benefit to players and felt unnecessary to designers.

When all six Robot Master stages are completed, the 7th (last) stage appears in the middle of the stage select menu. This stage, in which the player traverses Dr. Wily's robot factory, is a chain of four regular stages linked together, each containing at least one new boss. During these final stages, the six Robot Masters must also be fought again in a predetermined order before the final confrontation against Dr. Wily. As Mega Man's ammo is not restored between stages, every action the player takes is consequential.

== Development ==
Before Mega Man, Capcom made arcade games, and its console releases were mostly ports of these games. In the mid-1980s, Capcom made plans to develop Mega Man specifically for the Japanese home console market. They decided to bring in fresh, young talent for the small team, including artist Keiji Inafune, a recent college graduate who started on the Street Fighter team. Inafune recalled that the Mega Man development team worked extremely hard to complete the final product, with a project supervisor and lead designer who sought perfection in every possible aspect of the game.

The development team for Mega Man consisted of only six people. Inafune (credited as "Inafking") designed and illustrated nearly all of the game's characters and enemies, and the Japanese Rockman logo, box art, and instruction manual. He was responsible for rendering these designs into graphical sprite form. He said, "We didn't have [a lot of] people, so after drawing character designs, I was actually doing the dotting (pixelation) for the Nintendo. Back then, people weren't specialized and we had to do a lot of different things because there was so few people, so I really ended up doing all the characters." Inafune was influenced by the eponymous protagonist of Osamu Tezuka's manga Astro Boy in his Mega Man designs. Mega Man is colored blue because it seemed that the color had the most shades in the console's 56-color palette (cyan included), and that selection was used to enhance Mega Man's detail.

Although he is often credited for designing the character, Inafune insists that he "only did half of the job in creating him", as his mentor, director Akira Kitamura, developed the basic character concept before Inafune's arrival. The basic sprites for Roll and Dr. Light were created before Inafune joined the project, and the designs for Cut Man, Ice Man, Fire Man, and Guts Man were in process. Aside from normal enemies, Inafune's first character was Elec Man, inspired by American comic book characters. The artist has commented that Elec Man has always been his favorite design. The designs for Dr. Light and Dr. Wily were based on Santa Claus and Albert Einstein, respectively; the latter character was meant to represent an archetypal "mad scientist".

The team had initially considered names such as "Mighty Kid", "Knuckle Kid", and "Rainbow Man" before settling on their final decisions. The "Rainbow" name was considered because the character could change into seven colors based on the weapon selected. The production team chose a music motif when naming the main characters in Mega Man. The protagonist's original name is Rock and his sister's name is Roll, a play on the term "rock and roll". This type of naming would later be extended to many characters throughout the series. One of the original storylines considered by the team but not used in the final game was to have Roll be kidnapped, and Rock had to rescue her. Another idea had included a boss fight against a giant Roll near the end of the game.

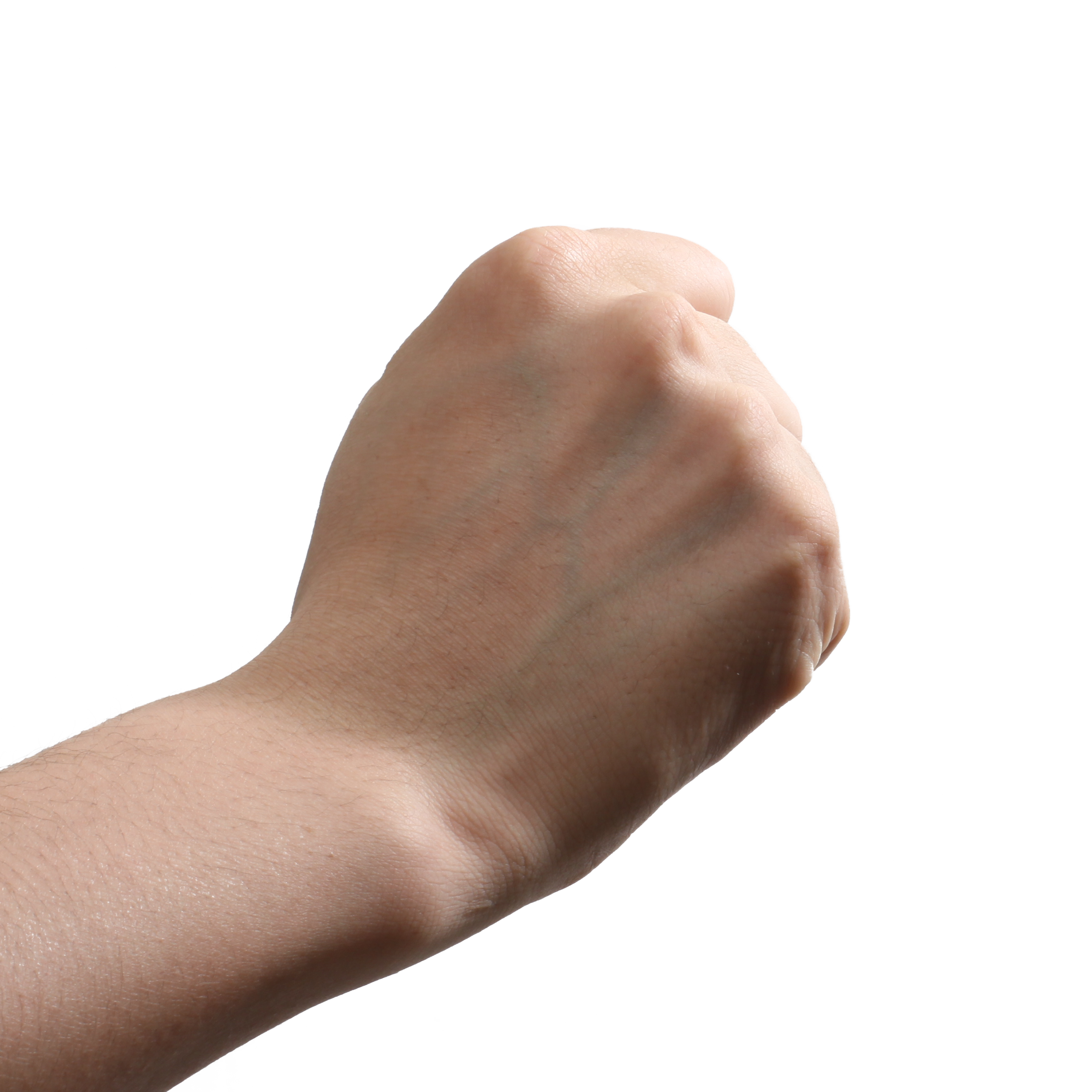
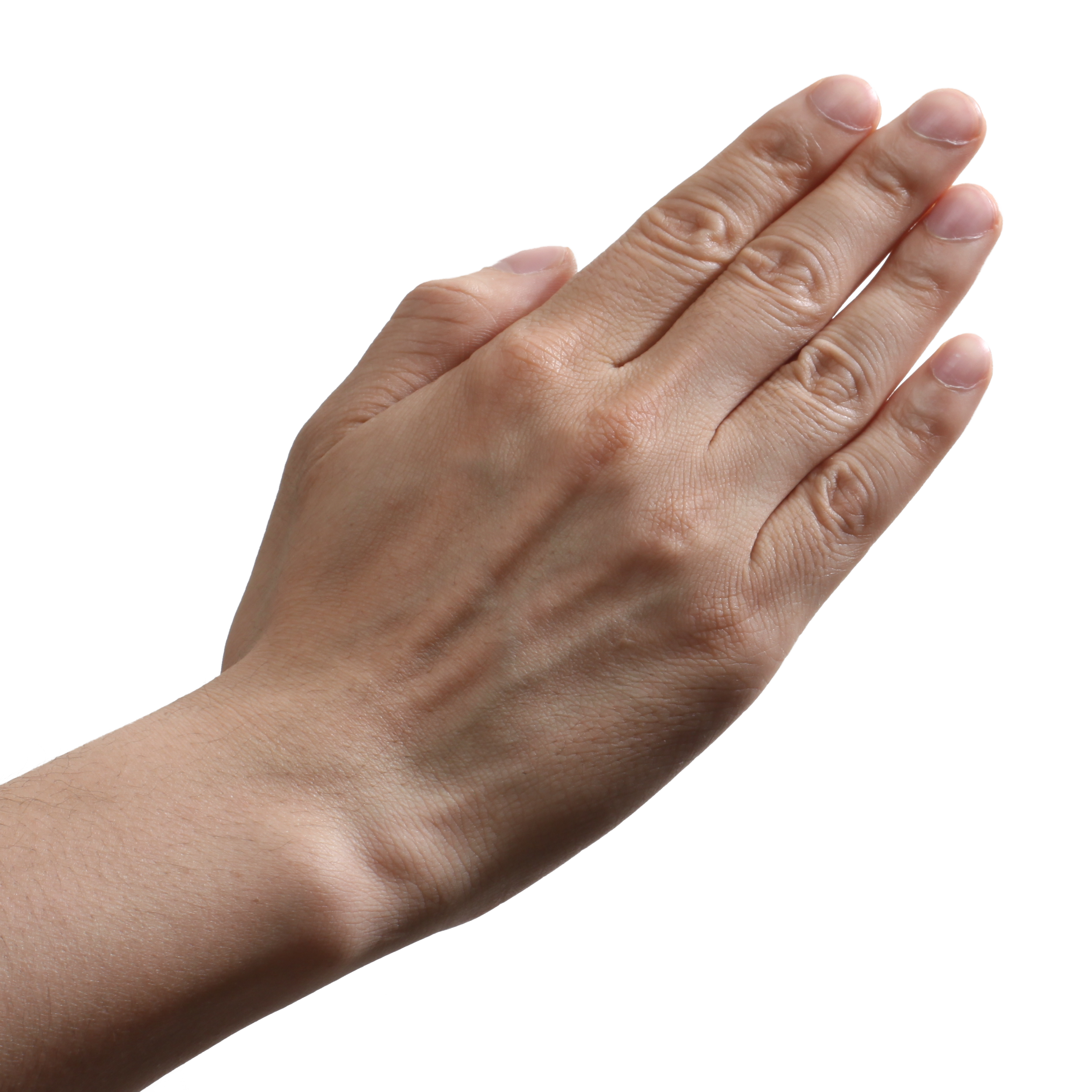
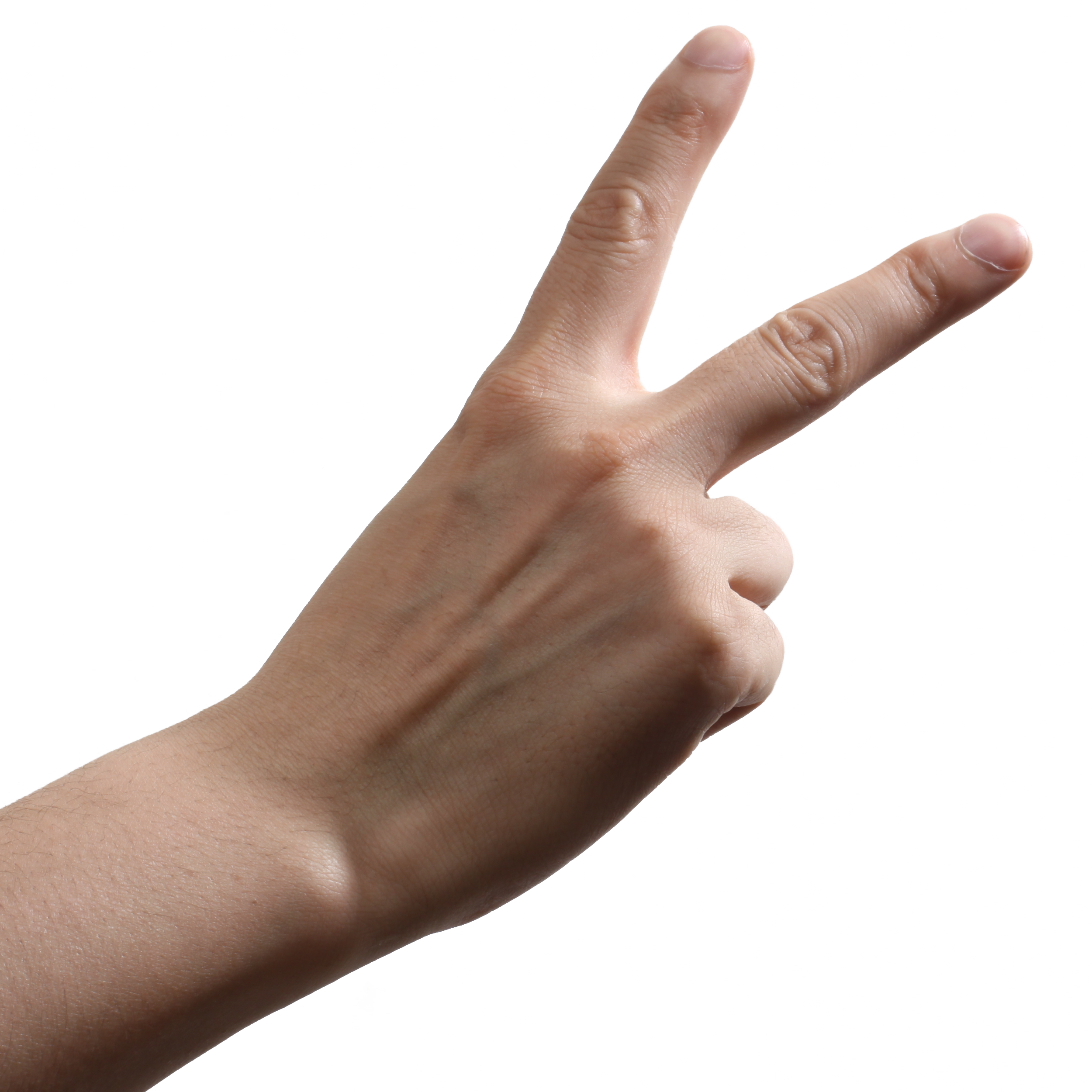
Mega Man's gameplay was inspired by rock paper scissors, where certain bosses are weak to other weapons, e.g. Cut Man is weak to Guts Man's weapon because Guts Man's weapon specializes in picking up and throwing rocks and rock beats scissors.

The team decided to incorporate anime elements for the game's animation. Inafune explained, "[Mega Man's] hand transforms into a gun and you can actually see it come out of his arm. We wanted to make sure that the animation and the motion was realistic and actually made sense. So with Mega Man, we had this perfect blending of game character with animation ideas." The gameplay for Mega Man was inspired by the game rock paper scissors. The project supervisor wanted a simple system that offered "deep gameplay". Each weapon deals a large amount of damage to one specific Robot Master, others have little to no effect against them, and there is no single weapon that dominates all the others. Mega Man was originally able to crouch, but the team decided against it since it made players' ability to determine the height of onscreen projectiles more difficult. Naoya Tomita (credited as "Tom Pon") began work on Mega Man's scenic backgrounds immediately after his Capcom training. Tomita proved himself amongst his peers by overcoming the challenges of the console's limited power through maximizing the use of background elements.

Mega Man was scored by Manami Matsumae (credited as "Chanchacorin Manami"), who composed the music, created the sound effects, and programmed the data in three months, using a sound driver programmed by Yoshihiro Sakaguchi (credited as "Yuukichan's Papa"). The musical notes were translated one by one into the computer language. Matsumae was challenged by the creative limits of three notes available at any one time, and when she was unable to write songs, she created the sound effects. She composed the music to be rock-oriented to fit its action gameplay and robotic protagonist, and to differentiate it from the classical style of other Capcom games.

When the game was localized for distribution in America, Capcom changed the title of the game from Rockman to Mega Man. This moniker was created by Capcom's then-Senior Vice President Joseph Morici, who claimed it was changed merely because he did not like the original name. "That title was horrible," Morici said. "So I came up with Mega Man, and they liked it enough to keep using it for the U.S. games." 1UP.com's Nadia Oxford attributed this change to Capcom's belief that American children would be more interested in a game with the latter title.

== Reception ==
Reception

Review scores
| Publication | Score |
|---|---|
| AllGame | 5/5 |
| Famitsu | 5/10, 7/10, 7/10, 5/10; 4/5 |
| IGN | 8/10 |
| Famicom Hisshoubon | 4/5 |
| The Games Machine | 83% |

Award
| Publication | Award |
|---|---|
| Golden Joystick Awards | Best Console Game (8-bit) |

Critics received Mega Man well. AllGame described the NES version of the game as a "near-perfect blend of action, challenge and audio-visual excellence" and awarded it five stars, their highest rating. Lucas M. Thomas of IGN described the game as an "undeniable classic" for the NES, noting its graphics, innovative weapon-based platform gameplay, and music. IGN editor Matt Casamassina proclaimed, "Mega Man is one of the best examples of great graphics, amazing music and near-perfect gameplay rolled into one cartridge". GameSpot writers Christian Nutt and Justin Speer identified the game as a "winner in gameplay" granted its "low-key presentation". Jeremy Parish of 1UP.com likewise outlined it as a "charming (if slightly rough) start for the series". InFamicom Hisshoubon, one reviewer complimented the action as the selling point of the game with its innovative ideas such as platforms that vanish and re-appear and the games "essence of ACG." A second reviewer complemented it as an exciting, simple and fun game and hoped Capcom would focus on games likes this for the Famicom instead of porting games to personal computers.

Reviews in Weekly Famitsu had two reviewers complimenting the game for having new original characters and being a rare action game at the time. Three reviewers commented the game was too difficult, with one saying that the "difficulty seems cruel, but the game is exciting!" Whether positive or negative, Mega Man has been commonly perceived as very difficult and is listed among the difficult games of Nintendo, being described by USGamer as “the introduction of the Nintendo Hard difficulty”. Casamassina found the game the hardest in the franchise, and among the hardest titles on the NES. Thomas observed that its combination of high difficulty and short length hurt its replayability. According to 1UP.com, the "Nintendo-hard" Mega Man bosses set the game apart from its two immediate and more popular sequels. Total! retrospectively characterized the game as "an overhard and unenjoyably frustrating platform nightmare".

=== Accolades ===
At the 1990 Golden Joystick Awards, Mega Man won the award for best console game of the year (8-bit).

Mega Man has additionally received various honors from video game journals and websites. IGN listed the game at number 30 on its "Top 100 NES Games of All Time". Nintendo Power ranked Mega Man at number 20 on its "100 Best Nintendo Games of All Time" in its September 1997 100th issue, then at number 61 in its "Top 200 Games" in its February 2006 200th issue. 1UP.com included it in their "Top 5 Overlooked Videogame Prequels" and as number 17 on its "Top 25 NES Games" list. British magazine The Games Machine awarded it the "Star Player" accolade after its launch in PAL regions.

== Legacy ==
The North American Mega Man release's inaccurate artwork is renowned for its poor quality, and blamed by Inafune for the region's weak sales.

Capcom's sales department originally believed that the game would not sell, but after Japan had received limited quantities, it had been seen as successful enough to quickly commission an American localization. As part of the rushed localization, the president of Capcom U.S.A. told the marketing representative to have a cover done by the next day, so he had a friend draw it within about six hours. Inafune blamed the game's relatively poor North American performance on its region-specific cover art, which visualized elements not found in the game: Mega Man himself resembles a man rather than a boy, his costume is colored yellow and blue instead of being entirely blue, and he is holding a handgun rather than having his arm cannon. Over the years, the cover art has been infamous in the gaming community. It has been considered one of the worst game covers of all time by publications including GameSpy, Wired, and OC Weekly. The cancelled Mega Man Universe was planned to feature a "Bad Box Art Mega Man" playable character alongside the classic 8-bit Mega Man. "Bad Box Art Mega Man" has since become a playable character in Street Fighter X Tekken. The TV series Mega Man: Fully Charged features an amateur superhero named Man Man whose outfit is physically based on the bad box art design.

With little overseas press coverage save for a full-page advertisement in Nintendo Fun Club News, sales gained momentum over word of mouth, making the game a sleeper hit. While Mega Man was not a large commercial accomplishment for Capcom, the company decided to allow the development team to create a sequel, Mega Man 2, for a 1988 Japanese release. Many of the design elements cut from the original Mega Man due to space limitations such as planned enemy characters were included in the follow-up game. Mega Man 2, with greatly improved box art, although still repeating the 'pistol' error, unchanged in directions from Capcom America, to veteran game illustrator Marc Ericksen, proved to be such a success that it solidified Mega Man as one of Capcom's longest-running franchises. Due to "overwhelming demand", Capcom reissued the original Mega Man in North America in September 1991. Capcom carried the same 8-bit graphics and sprites present in the original Mega Man into the next five games in the main series. Even though the sequels feature more complex storylines, additional gameplay mechanics, and better graphics, the core elements initiated by Mega Man remain the same throughout the series. Mega Man 9 and Mega Man 10 would later revert to the familiar graphical style set forth by this title. The scoring system in Mega Man has not been present in any of its sequels.

According to GamesRadar, Mega Man was the first game to feature a nonlinear "level select" option, as a stark contrast to linear games like Super Mario Bros. and open world games like The Legend of Zelda and Metroid. GamesRadar credits the "level select" feature of Mega Man as the basis for the nonlinear mission structure found in most multi-mission, open world, sidequest-heavy games, such as Grand Theft Auto, Red Dead Redemption, and Spider-Man: Shattered Dimensions.

== Remakes and re-releases ==
Mega Man has been re-released several times since its 1987 debut. A version with enhanced graphics and arranged music was included alongside Mega Man 2 and Mega Man 3 in the Mega Drive compilation Mega Man: The Wily Wars. Another adaptation of the game was released in Japan on the PlayStation as part of the Rockman Complete Works series in 1999. This version also features arranged music in addition to a special "Navi Mode" that directs the player in certain portions of the levels. Mega Man was compiled with nine other games in the series in the North American Mega Man Anniversary Collection released for the PlayStation 2 and GameCube in 2004 and the Xbox in 2005. A mobile phone rendition of Mega Man developed by Lavastorm was released for download in North America in 2004. A separate, 2007 Japanese mobile phone release received a 2008 update adding the option to play as Roll. Mega Man for the NES was reissued on the Virtual Console service for three different systems: the Wii in Europe in 2007 and in North America and Japan in 2008, the Nintendo 3DS in 2012, and for the Wii U in 2013. The Complete Works version of the game was made available on the PlayStation Store in both Japan and North America. Mega Man was later released as part of the Mega Man Legacy Collection, a compilation of the first six entries in the series, in 2015 for Nintendo 3DS, PlayStation 4, Windows and Xbox One, and for Nintendo Switch in 2018 as both a standalone release and a bundle with Mega Man Legacy Collection 2, which comprised the latter four games in the classic series at the time.

An enhanced remake titled Mega Man Powered Up — known as Rockman Rockman (ロックマン ロックマン) in Japan — was released worldwide for the PSP in 2006. The game features a graphical overhaul with 3D chibi-style character models with large heads and small bodies. Inafune had originally planned to make Mega Man look this way, but could not due to the hardware constraints of the NES. Producer Tetsuya Kitabayashi stated that redesigning the character models was a result of the PSP's 16:9 widescreen ratio. The larger heads on the characters allowed the development team to create visible facial expressions. "The concept for these designs was 'toys'. We wanted cute designs geared towards little kids ... the kinds of characters that you'd see hanging off of keychains and such," character designer Tatsuya Yoshikawa explained. "Not only that, I made sure to tell the designers not to skimp on any of the original Mega Man details. We wanted their proportions and movements to be accurately reflected in these designs as well." As the size of the remake's stages are not proportional to those of the original, the widescreen ratio also presented the developers with more space to fill.

Mega Man Powered Up features two styles of gameplay: "Old Style" is comparable to the NES version aside from the updated presentation, and "New Style" uses the PSP's entire widescreen and contains storyline cutscenes with voice acting, altered stage layouts, remixed music, and three difficulty modes for each stage. This mode also adds two new Robot Masters (Oil Man and Time Man). The NES version was originally intended to have a total of eight Robot Masters, but was cut down to six due to a tight schedule. Additionally, the remake lets players unlock and play through the game as the eight Robot Masters, Roll, and Protoman. The New Style stages differ in structure from that of Old Style, with some pathways only accessible to specific Robot Masters. Mega Man Powered Up also features a Challenge Mode with 100 challenges to complete, a level editor for creating custom stages, and an option to distribute fan-made levels to the PlayStation Network online service. Mega Man Powered Up received generally positive reviews, with aggregate scores of 83% on GameRankings and 82 out of 100 on Metacritic as of May 2010. The remake sold poorly at retail, and was later released as a paid download on the Japanese PlayStation Network digital store and as a bundled with Mega Man Maverick Hunter X in Japan and North America. Capcom additionally translated Mega Man Powered Up into Chinese for release in Asia in 2008.
