= Mega Man Universe =

- Developer: Capcom
- Publisher: Capcom
- Producer: Akiko Ito
- Designer: Keiji Inafune
- Series: Mega Man
- Platforms: Xbox Live Arcade, PlayStation Network
- Release: Cancelled
- Genre: Platform
- Mode: Single-player

Mega Man Universe (メガマン ユニバース, Mega Man Yunibāsu) was the name of a cancelled 2.5D side-scrolling platform game in the Mega Man series that was being developed by Capcom for Xbox Live Arcade and PlayStation Network. Mainly based on Mega Man 2, the game would have allowed players to create their own levels and customize characters. It would have been the first game in the franchise to be referred to as "Mega Man" in Japan, where the franchise is known as "Rockman".

== Summary ==
Much like the contemporary downloadable releases, Mega Man 9 and 10, the gameplay took its cue from Mega Man 2, forgoing the special abilities introduced in games afterwards. However, the game was given a 2.5D look, featuring rendered level designs and CG characters. The game's base story and main campaign would have been based on those of Mega Man 2. In this game, however, players would have the choice to construct their own levels, or customize existing levels, using various tools to place platforms, obstacles, enemies and items. These levels could then be shared online for other people to play. Players would also be able to customize their Mega Man with exchangeable parts and special chips which would give each Mega Man unique attributes, such as jumping height, available weapons, etc. Alongside the customizable characters, the game was to offer several iterations of Mega Man, including one based on the North American NES box art of Mega Man, along with characters from other Capcom properties such as Ryu from Street Fighter and Arthur from Ghosts 'n Goblins. DLC was also planned.

== Development ==
Production of the game began in March 2010. News of Mega Man Universe first appeared when Capcom registered the trademark on April 27, 2010. On July 16, 2010, a stop motion animated teaser trailer created by American production company iam8bit was released, which featured Mega Man, Ryu from Street Fighter and Arthur from Ghosts 'n Goblins.

Mega Man artist and producer Keiji Inafune stated "We wanted to preserve as much as we can of the classic 8-bit Mega Man feel, while allowing players to project their own Mega Man onto the game." The first gameplay trailers were released on September 2, 2010, and it was later revealed that the game would feature a level editor and character customization. Trailers for the game featured music by cover band, The Megas. The game's development team consisted of various Capcom members who had previously worked on the first few Mega Man titles. Producer Akiko Ito stated that the game was quite early in production and was currently asking for feedback on what fans would like to see in the game.

Four months later, after the departure of Keiji Inafune, Capcom's Christian "Sven" Svensson reported that despite the continued silence on the game's development, it was not cancelled, although it had experienced some significant changes due to criticism regarding unresponsive controls and strong negative feedback regarding the game's art direction. However, on March 31, 2011, Capcom announced the game had been cancelled due to "various circumstances."
