= Star Inc. (company) =

Japanese record label

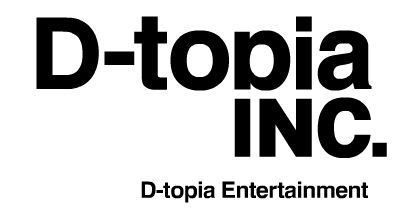
Logo of D-topia Entertainment

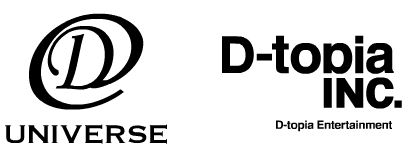
Logo of D-Topia Universe (left), a new label in partnership and distribution with Universal Music Japan created in September 2010.

D-topia Entertainment (previously known as DTJ or D-Topia Japan) is a Japanese record label produced by Terukado Ōnishi, officially established in public prior to December 14, 2007. The label is dedicated to promoting girls' entertainment, particularly the music of female singers. It was formed as a business partnership between Avex Group, its co-area promoter, and Victor Entertainment, its distributing label.

On September 9, 2010, D-topia announced that they had paired with Universal Music Japan to create a new label, D-Topia Universe, with distribution by Universal Music Japan. The label's first release was Aira Mitsuki's third full-length album, "???", released on November 17, 2010.

== Musical style ==
The label's tagline is "Undertaking girls' entertainment" (ガールズエンターテイメントは引き受けます, Gārusu entāteimento wa hikiukemasu).

Originally the home of rock-pop idol group Harenchi Punch, the main focus of D-topia was originally very idol-centric. Towards 2009, the focus of the label gradually shifted to electronica acts starting with Mega Trance audition winner Aira Mitsuki.

In 2010, D-topia's musical styles changed again, with the newcomer group KOR=GIRL performing in a sound incorporating alternative rock and electronica. Formerly an Akihabara-style technopop idol, Saori@destiny released the more experimental album "WORLD WILD 2010", which received some attention from critics for its mix of electronic dance music styles such as funk carioca and funkot, many of which had never been attempted in Japan before.

In 2012, the label added the idol group Happy Super Generation to its lineup of artists, who became ICT Lovelies!! in 2013.

In November 2017, the company rebranded as "Star, Inc." after a number of artist in the label filed a lawsuit.

== Current acts ==
- Ready Candy Camp
- Mariane Takanashi

== Former acts ==
- 80_pan (previously Harenchi Punch & 80★PAN!) (now disbanded)
- Saya Ozora (formerly of 80★PAN!) (graduated)
- Aira Mitsuki (August 2007; March 2008 - Major Debut)
- Kaze (August 2011)
- Minamelo (August 2011)
- Saori@destiny (December 2007; March 2008 - Major Debut)
- Miyabi Chinatsu (graduated)
- Suzuoto Hikari (graduated)
- The Sakura Telephone (project group)
- Yui
- Sayu
- Rako
- Rikaco
- KOR=GIRL
- Happy Super Generation
- ICT Lovelies!! (formerly Happy Super Generation)

== Releases ==
Albums

The following albums listed below are distributed by Victor Entertainment.

| Catalogue No. | Release date | Title | Artist |
|---|---|---|---|
| VUCD-60001 | 2008/09/03 | C.O.P.Y (limited edition) | Mitsuki Aira |
| VUCD-60002 | 2008/09/03 | C.O.P.Y (normal edition) | Mitsuki Aira |
| VUCD-60003 | 2008/11/19 | Japanese Chaos | Saori@destiny |
| VUCD-60004 | 2009/03/18 | Wow War Techno | Saori@destiny |
| VUCD-60005 | 2009/07/22 | Plastic (CD-only) | Mitsuki Aira |
| VUCD-60006 | 2010/04/14 | World Wild 2010 | Saori@destiny |
| VUCD-60007 | 2010/06/02 | 6 Force (limited edition) | Mitsuki Aira |
| VUCD-60008 | 2010/06/02 | 6 Force (normal edition) | Mitsuki Aira |
| VUCD-60009 | 2010/07/21 | KOR=GIRL I | KOR=GIRL |

The following albums are released under D-Topia Universe and is distributed by Universal Music Japan.

| Catalogue No. | Release date | Title | Artist |
|---|---|---|---|
| POCS-1201 | 2010/11/17 | ??? (CD-only) | Mitsuki Aira |
| POCS-1202 | 2011/06/15 | Domestic Domain | Saori@destiny |
| POCS-1203 | 2011/12/07 | X: Park of the Safari | Aira Mitsuki x Saori@destiny |
| POCS-1205 | 2012/11/07 | Dare ga Debut Dekiru no? | Happy Super Generation |
| POCS-1208 | 2013/08/21 | I'll Be Back | Aira Mitsuki |
