= Aira no Kagaku CD =

Aira's Science CD

Compilation album by Mitsuki Aira
- Released: June 18, 2009
- Genres: Electropop, Shibuya-kei
- Label: D-topia Entertainment
- Producer: Ōnishi Terukado

Mitsuki Aira chronology
C.O.P.Y (2008)	Aira's Science CD (2009)	Plastic (2009)

Aira's Science CD (Ａｉｒａの科学ＣD, Aira no Kagaku CD), is a compilation album by the Japanese electronica artist Mitsuki Aira. It was released June 18, 2009.

The CD contains two tracks that feature the thereminvox played by Masami Takeuchi, "Science Music" and "Senjō no Merry Christmas". The "-1 track" versions of these songs do not include the theremin.

"Mike Alway's Diary" is a cover of the song by Kahimi Karie.

== Track listing ==
1. Science Music (サイエンス・ミュージック)
2. Senjō no Merry Christmas (戦場のメリークリスマス)
3. Happiness land (I Am Robot and Proud ver.)
4. Mike Alway's Diary
5. Science Music (-1 track ver.)
6. Senjō no Merry Christmas (-1 track ver.)
