= Secrets from the Future =

Studio album by MC Frontalot
- Released: April 6, 2007
- Recorded: Stately Fain Manor, Somerville, and Underhill Downs, Brooklyn
- Genre: Nerdcore
- Length: 51:59
- Label: Level Up / Nerdcore Fervor
- Producers: MC Frontalot, Baddd Spellah, Nate Van iLL

MC Frontalot chronology
Nerdcore Rising (2005)	Secrets from the Future (2007)	Final Boss (2008)

Professional ratings
Review scores
Source	Rating
AllMusic	link

Secrets from the Future is the second studio album from nerdcore hip-hop artist MC Frontalot. It was released on tour and through his website on April 6, 2007.

Like his first album, Nerdcore Rising, it is composed mostly of new material but does include two remakes from before Nerdcore Rising ("Gonna Be Your Man" and "Romantic Cheapskate"). The album features extensive references to computer culture and video games. A video has been created for the song "It Is Pitch Dark". The video was directed by Jason Scott Sadofsky, and features a cameo by Steve Meretzky. It was publicly screened for the first time at the 2007 Penny Arcade Expo.

The front cover art for the album was done by Mike Krahulik of the webcomic Penny Arcade. Inside art was done by Jeffrey Rowland, himself famous for a number of webcomics. The track "Livin' at the Corner of Dude & Catastrophe" is about another webcomic, Achewood. The song "Very Poorly Concealed Secret Track" is actually a remix/re-recording of "The Ping Pong Song" by Optimus Rhyme, with MC Frontalot contributing an additional verse.

== Track listing ==
No.	Title	Length
1.	"Secrets from the Future"	4:50
2.	"You Got Asperger's"	5:12
3.	"Livin' at the Corner of Dude & Catastrophe"	3:44
4.	"Bizarro Genius Baby"	4:26
5.	"Origin of Species"	4:01
6.	"I Hate Your Blog"	4:04
7.	"It Is Pitch Dark"	4:56
8.	"Forbidden Planet"	5:11
9.	"A Skit About Robots"	2:05
10.	"Gonna Be Your Man"	2:58
11.	"Very Poorly Concealed Secret Track" (featuring Optimus Rhyme)	4:58
12.	"Romantic Cheapskate v.2.0"	4:10
13.	"The OMG Skit"	1:24

== Credits ==
It Is Pitch Dark
A short sample of "It Is Pitch Dark" from this album.

Additional Musicians

- Alec Berlin – guitar
- Andrew Griffin – drums
- Baddd Spellah - drum programming
- Brad "Sucks" Turcotte - guitar, bass, synthesizer, vocals
- Brandon "Blak Lotus" Patton – bass guitar
- Dan "The Categorical Imperative" Thiel – drums
- Daniel "DJ Snyder" Wilkes - scratching
- Doug Cheatwood - harmonica
- Frankie Big Face - saxophone
- Gabriel "Gm7" Alter – keyboard, organ, vocals
- Ganda Suthivarakom - vocals
- Jess Klein - vocals
- Jessica Neighbor - vocals
- Optimus Rhyme - vocals
- Sam Bigelow - vocals
- Sean McPharlin - theremin
- Sturgis "The Sturgenius" Cunningham - drums
- Whoremoans - vocals

Design

- Owen Freeman - tray and disc illustration
- Mike Krahulik – cover illustration
- Jeffrey Rowland - back cover illustration
