= Why Two? =

Single by Aira Mitsuki

Single by Mitsuki Aira

from the album ???
- Released: October 20, 2010 (Japan)
- Recorded: 2010
- Genre: J-pop, house
- Length: 4:02
- Label: D-Topia Universe
- Songwriter(s): Mitsuki Aira, Alex Funk It
- Producer(s): Onishi Terukado

Mitsuki Aira singles chronology
"Aishi Aisarete Ikiru No Sa" (2010)	"Why Two?" (2010)

Music video
- "Why Two?" teaser music video on YouTube

"Why Two?" (stylized as WHY TWO?) is a song by Japanese electronica artist and lyricist Mitsuki Aira. It is one of the lead singles from her third studio album, ???. The single was released as a digital download online, most specifically iTunes, on October 20, 2010 in Japan, a week after the release of "Aishi Aisarete Ikiru no Sa".

== Background ==
The single was released a week after the album's first single, "Aishi Aisarete Ikiru no Sa" (a Kenji Ozawa original), on October 20, 2010 on online retailer iTunes. A teaser PV for the single was released on November 3, 2010 via D-Topia's official YouTube account, along with the song's sample with the other tracks on the same day.

The lyrics for the song was written by Mitsuki Aira herself while the composition was written by Alex Funk It. The lyrics are expressed using autotune, in which voice shifting devices became a standard in almost all of Aira's songs.

== Music video ==
The music video for the song was shot in three places: Aira sitting beside a bathtub full of water, another was Aira on a light blue studio in multiple angle shots, and on the bedroom. The music video starts with Aira beside a bathtub attempting to call someone on her mobile phone and then switches to a scene with Aira singing on a light blue studio in multiple angles, also shifting to the scene of her and the bathtub in which she looked worried. On the second verse of the song, Aira is seen lying on a bed with a drawing pad and colored pencils. On the second chorus, she draws something on the drawing pad while singing and smiling (pictured). On the bridge, on the scene of Aira and the bathtub, snow began to fall. The scene changes again to Aira on the blue room shot in multiple angles while she is singing. at the end of the song, the scene shifts finally to Aira and the first setting while snow is falling.
