= MC Frontalot =

American nerdcore rapper (born 1973)

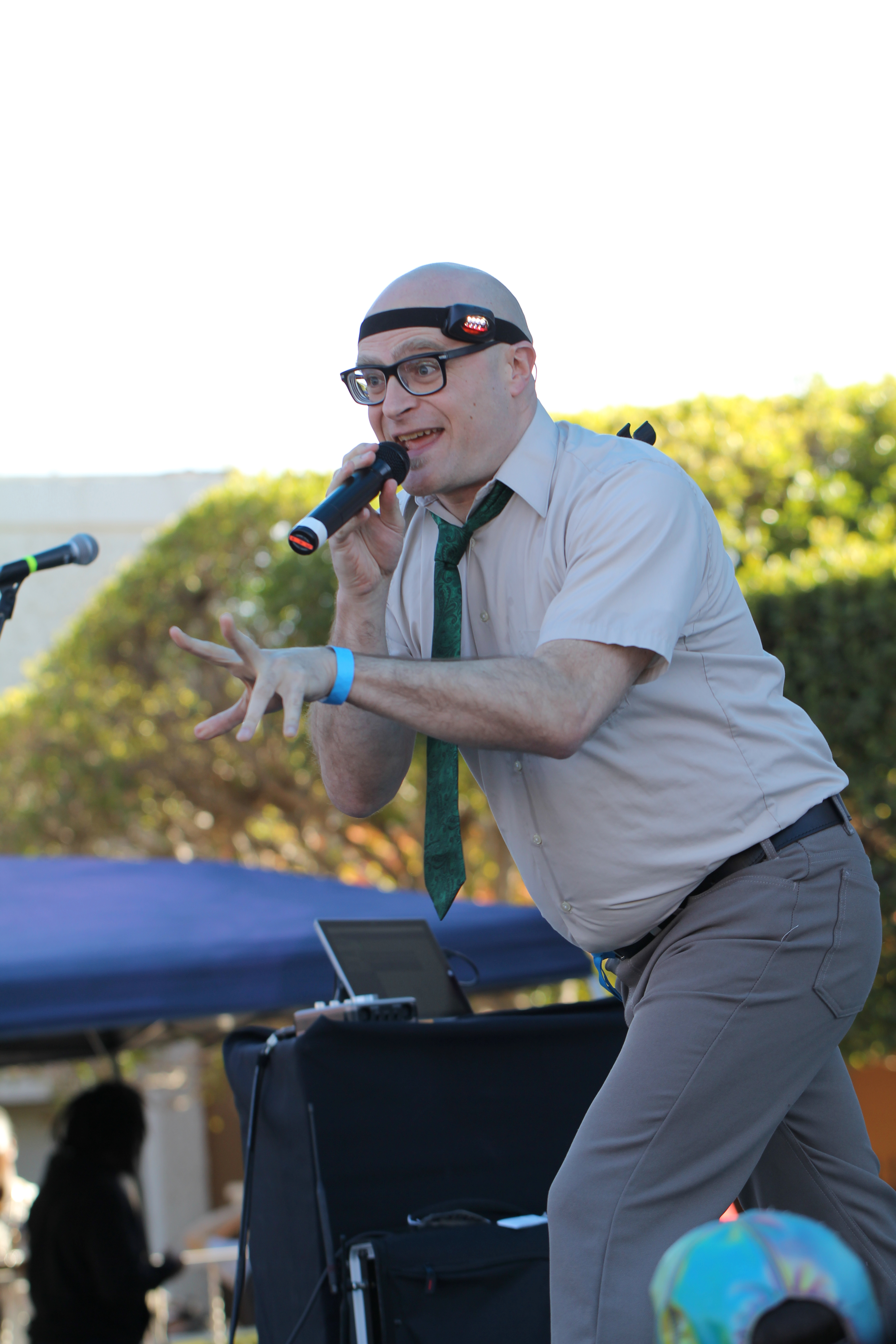
- MC Frontalot performing in February 2018

Background information
- Also known as: The Godfather of Nerdcore
- Born: Damian Alexander Hess; December 3, 1973 (age 52); San Francisco, California, U.S.
- Genres: Hip-hop; nerdcore
- Occupations: Rapper; web designer
- Instrument: Vocals
- Years active: 1999–present
- Label: Level Up (current)
- Website: frontalot.com

Damian Alexander Hess (born December 3, 1973), better known by his stage name MC Frontalot, is an American rapper and web designer. He is widely credited as a pioneer of the nerdcore genre, blending elements of hip-hop with themes from nerd culture.

== Career ==
=== Early days ===
Hess began releasing music as MC Frontalot in 1999. He gained early recognition through Song Fight!, an online songwriting and recording competition, where he consistently outperformed competitors. Although he has entered only seven songs under the name MC Frontalot, he has never lost a competition. One notable entry, "Romantic Cheapskate," received 614 votes, far surpassing the next closest competitor with 28 votes. In this song, Frontalot metaphorically compares Song Fight! to a neglected lover who remains loyal despite his indifference.

In 2000, Frontalot released "Nerdcore Hiphop," which gained popularity in the geek and nerd communities. The rap subgenre of nerdcore, which had been developing among various performers, adopted the title and has since expanded rapidly. Although Hess is often considered the founder of nerdcore, he notes on his website that other early artists also deserve credit. His first studio album, Nerdcore Rising, was released on August 27, 2005. The album featured six new songs and ten remixed tracks, with some new material produced by artists from Song Fight!, including indie rock and hip-hop artist Doctor Popular.

=== Spotlight ===
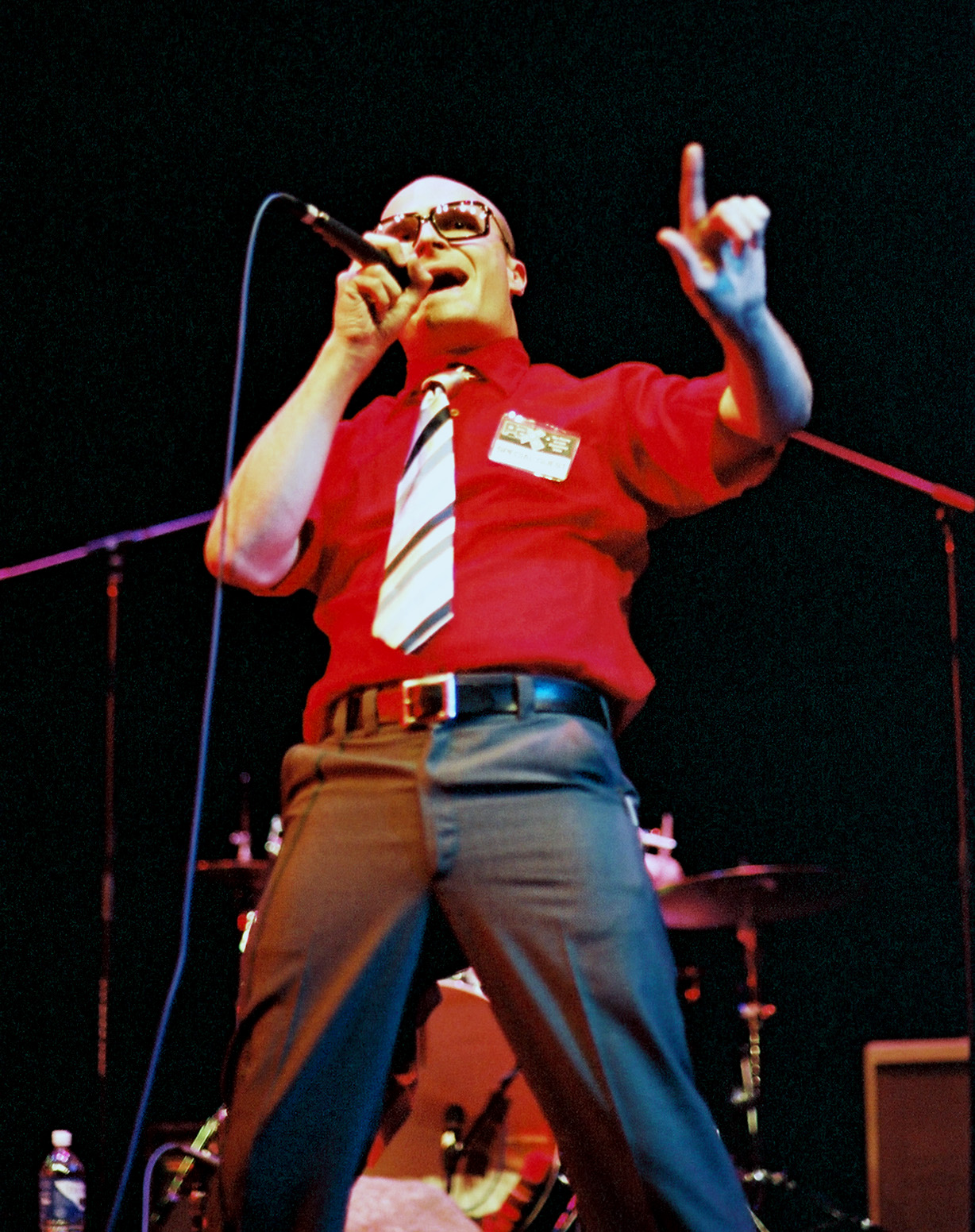
MC Frontalot performing live at PAX in 2004

On March 18, 2002, the popular webcomic Penny Arcade named Frontalot their rapper laureate, significantly boosting his popularity. This recognition led to regular performances at the Penny Arcade Expo (PAX), where he became a fixture from 2004 until 2013.

In 2004, 2 songs from MC Frontalot were featured on Roxor Games In the Groove, Which MC Was That, and PA Theme (Penny Arcade Theme on the PC/Mac version of In The Groove).

In 2006, Frontalot wrote and performed "Living at the Corner of Dude and Catastrophe", a song based on the webcomic Achewood. This track became the webcomic's theme song and was later included as a downloadable track for the video game Rock Band in 2008. Around the same time, he appeared on the Baddd Spellah track "Rhyme of the Nibelung," which won CBC Radio 2's Remix the Ring contest. Frontalot's track "Final Boss" was featured over the end credits of the video game Penny Arcade Adventures: On the Rain-Slick Precipice of Darkness in 2008. Throughout his career, he made occasional appearances in the webcomic Overcompensating by Jeffrey Rowland, and was featured in commercials for G4 TV. He also appeared on the show Freestyle 101, where he performed parts of his songs with freestyle lines connecting them.

In 2009, Frontalot's song "Origin of Species", a satirical critique of Creation Science, was featured as downloadable content for Rock Band during the Penny Arcade Expo. In 2010, several articles stated the criticism that nerdcore could be perceived as "racist" if the genre failed to acknowledge the roots of mainstream hip-hop, stating that black people's contributions to music will be overlooked or erased in the process. The critics believe that MC Frontalot addressed these complaints indirectly in his album Zero Day, which contains themes of technological disruption and outsider identity. The album, of course, did not change to a different genre as the critics desired. The album was praised for its exploration of digital theft, technology crises, and how these themes are related to the culture dynamics of other genres of rap, and is perceived by some of the articles' authors to contain commentary on both innovation and appropriation within the genre.

=== Live performances ===
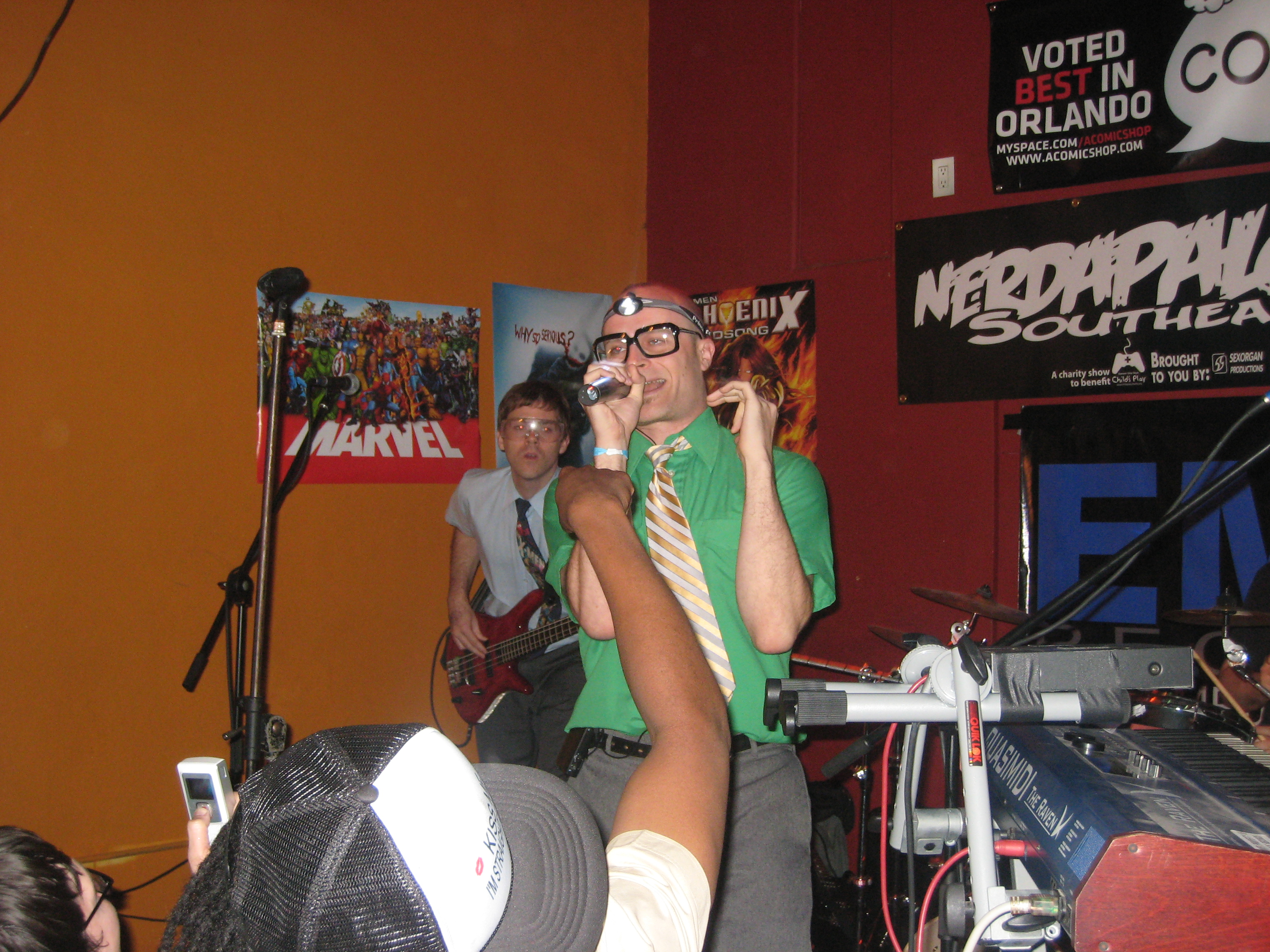
MC Frontalot performing at Nerdapalooza in July 2008

Although most of his fanbase is online, Hess gave a handful of live performances while living in San Francisco, and several more after moving to New York City. His first official tour started on May 12, 2006, with shows mostly in the Southeastern United States. When he performs, he plays with a full ensemble, including keyboardist and frequent collaborator Gminor7, bassist Blak Lotus, and drummer The SturGENiUS. Other occasional band members include G.LATINusKY00B, The Categorical Imperative, Vic 20, and 56K.

Hess completed a tour with Schäffer the Darklord in November 2007 and began another tour in November 2008 with MC Lars and YTCracker. As of June 2010, he has been touring with alternative rock musicians Wheatus on their UK leg of their 10th anniversary tour, occasionally providing guest vocals and performing with Wheatus on some of his tracks.

=== Film and television ===
Hess starred as "TP Factory Rapper" in the Sesame Street direct-to-video movie Elmo's Potty Time.

Nerdcore Rising is a documentary/concert film starring Hess and various other nerdcore artists such as MC Chris, Optimus Rhyme, and MC Lars, with contributions from "Weird Al" Yankovic, Prince Paul, and Brian Posehn. The film, directed and produced by Negin Farsad, premiered at the 2008 South by Southwest festival in Austin, Texas. It combines interviews about nerdcore and its origins with footage of Frontalot's 2006 Nerdcore Rising national tour.

Hess was interviewed in Alexandre O. Philippe's documentary, The People vs. George Lucas, which premiered at the 2010 South by Southwest Film Festival. Hess attended the festival as a musician and panelist.

Hess made an appearance as a judge on the sixth episode of the first season of TBS's King of the Nerds, which originally aired on February 21, 2013.

== Musical influences ==
Much of Hess's early music features samples from other artists' works, often using music from well-known artists such as Paul Simon, They Might Be Giants, James Brown, and Fiona Apple. One example of this is the song "Good Old Clyde", which comments on and uses the popular "Funky Drummer" drum break by Clyde Stubblefield.

Since beginning to sell his albums commercially, Hess has collaborated on nearly all his tracks with Baddd Spellah, an electronic musician and hip-hop producer, and Gaby "Gminor7" Alter, a composer and keyboardist whose playing forms the basis for many of Frontalot's earlier songs. Hess has also worked with other rappers such as MC Hawking and Canadian rapper Jesse Dangerously.

His lyrical topics and themes include webcomics, computer games, blogs, Star Wars, fan conventions and flirting.

== Discography ==
It Is Pitch Dark
A short sample of "It Is Pitch Dark" from the second album, Secrets from the Future (2007).

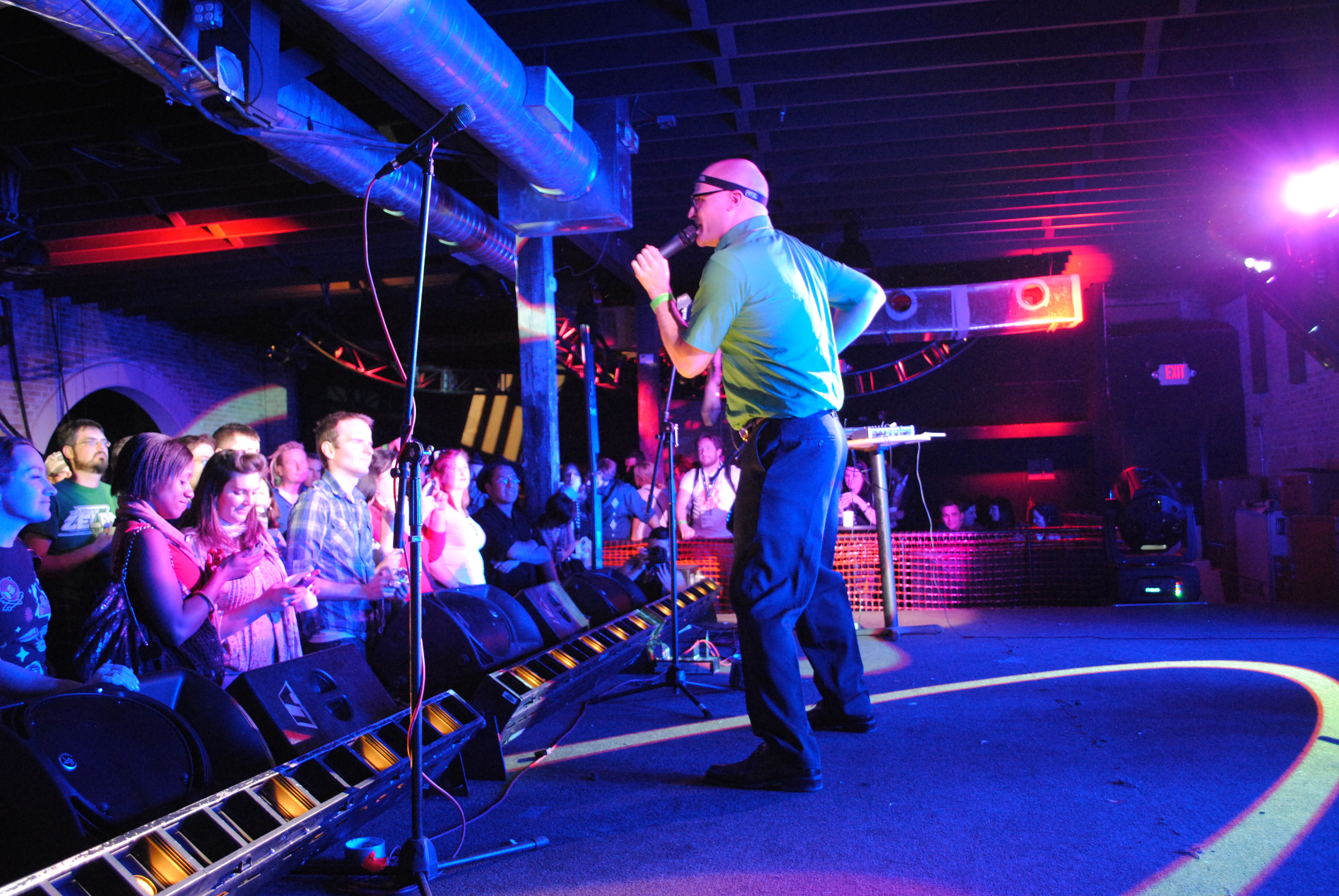
MC Frontalot performing at SXSW in March 2010

=== Studio albums ===
- Nerdcore Rising (2005)
- Secrets from the Future (2007)
- Final Boss (2008)
- Zero Day (2010)
- Solved (2011)
- Question Bedtime (2014)
- Net Split, or the Fathomless Heartbreak of Online Itself (2018)

=== Other releases ===
- Nerdcore Hiphop (freely available demo)
- Favoritism (greatest hits collective available exclusively in the Humble Music Bundle)
- Front's Humble Remix Addendum EP (remix collective available exclusively in the Humble Music Bundle)

=== Non-album tracks ===
- "24 Hours" (abandoned demo)
- "Bitchslap" (by MC Hawking)
- "My Sister" (by Duboce Triangle with The JBB)
- "Oh, the Hilarity" (from Indie Pop Cares a Lot)
- "Rappers We Crush" (with Kompressor)
- "Rhyme of the Nibelung" (with Baddd Spellah)
- "Romantic Cheapskate" (with Baddd Spellah for Song Fight!)
- "Soda Water" (by Jess Klein)
- "Oneonta (Eli Porter)" (with YTCracker and MC Lars on The Digital Gangster LP)
- "O.G. Original Gamer (with MC Lars on the MC Lars album This Gigantic Robot Kills)
- "Don't Wear Those Shoes" (for the "Weird Al" Yankovic tribute album Twenty-Six and a Half)
- "Another First Kiss" (for the They Might Be Giants "Mink Car" tribute album marking the 10th anniversary of the World Trade Center attacks.)
- "Challenge Your Audience (Featuring MC Frontalot & More or Les" (by Mikal kHill)
- "Common Loot" (featuring McGwire (vocal), Wheatus on guitar, Gaby Alter (credited as Gm7) on keyboard, and Rob Mitzner (credited as Beard Science)
