= Katrina Rose Dideriksen =

American actress

Katrina Rose Dideriksen (born May 25, 1983) is an actress originally from North Carolina. She lived in Durham, North Carolina, as a child and attended Durham School of the Arts in high school. She later studied at New York University Steinhardt School of Education before attending an open call for the musical Hairspray. After winning over the producers, Dideriksen was first sent to the Toronto Hairspray cast and then joined the touring company. Dideriksen originated the role of Tracy for The Luxor production of Hairspray in Las Vegas opposite Harvey Fierstein. She played Tracy until the Vegas show closed in June 2006. She has also starred in Hairspray in Pittsburgh and Houston, as well as revisited the Standby position on Broadway. She performed as Shawntel and Eve in the Carnegie Hall performance of Jerry Springer: The Opera, in the GLSEN benefit performance of Zanna, Don't! as Roberta, in Stained at Ars Nova and in Bernice Bobs Her Mullet in the New York Musical Theatre Festival.

More recently, Dideriksen was Mimi in Rent opposite Justin Guarini at Surflight Theatre, Rizzo in Grease opposite Marc Summers, and a Swing in the off-Broadway production of Rent.

Dideriksen is a consistent member of Joe Iconis' musical "family", performing in numerous concerts and shows such as Things to Ruin and Bloodsong of Love: The Rock N Roll Spaghetti Western.

She can be heard on the cast recording of Things to Ruin: The Songs of Joe Iconis, released by Sh-K-Boom Records. She also appeared in MC Frontalot's third album, Final Boss on the track "Socks On", as well as on his fifth album Solved on the tracks "Front the Least" and the title track "Solved".

== The Voice ==
In 2017, Katrina Rose became a contestant on the thirteenth season of reality television program The Voice. She performed Janis Joplin's "Kozmic Blues" for her blind audition and managed to turn the chair of Miley Cyrus, who became her initial coach. She proceeded to the Battle rounds on Team Miley and performed the song "W.O.M.A.N." by Etta James with her opponent, Janice Freeman. Cyrus ultimately named Freeman the winner of the Battle, but Katrina Rose received a reprieve when she was stolen onto Team Jennifer Hudson, saving her from elimination and ensuring her a spot in the upcoming Knockout rounds. In the knockout rounds, Hudson paired her with opponent Chris Weaver. Katrina Rose performed "Zombie" from The Cranberries, with Hudson ultimately choosing Weaver as the winner, eliminating Rose from the competition.
