= Nerdcore hiphop =

Nerdcore hiphop may refer to:

- Nerdcore hip hop, a musical genre
- Nerdcore Hiphop (album), a demo album by MC Frontalot, as well as a song on that album
