= Nerdcore Rising =

Studio album by MC Frontalot
- Released: August 27, 2005
- Recorded: 2005, Deep Mission Studios, San Francisco, and Underhill Downs, Brooklyn
- Genre: Nerdcore
- Length: 48:42
- Label: Level Up / Nerdcore Fervor
- Producer: MC Frontalot

MC Frontalot chronology
Nerdcore Hiphop (2004)	Nerdcore Rising (2005)	Secrets from the Future (2007)

Professional ratings
Review scores
Source	Rating
AllMusic	link

Nerdcore Rising is the official debut album by nerdcore rapper MC Frontalot. The album was first released on August 27, 2005 at the Penny Arcade Expo.

It consists of 16 tracks; six new tracks and ten "classic megahits" that Frontalot had previously made available through his website. Vocals for each of the old songs have been re-recorded, and production on these tracks range from slight variation on the original to drastic revisions.

The voice of the "preacher" character in the song "Indier Than Thou" was provided by Remy Auberjonois, son of René Auberjonois, the actor who portrayed Odo on the science fiction series Star Trek: Deep Space Nine.

== Track listing ==
No.	Title	Length
1.	"Charity Case"	3:11
2.	"Goth Girls"	4:22
3.	"Pr0n S0ng"	3:36
4.	"Yellow Lasers"	2:49
5.	"This Old Man"	3:40
6.	"Nerdcore Rising" (featuring Jesse Dangerously and MC Hawking)	4:40
7.	"Which MC Was That?"	3:23
8.	"Penny Arcade Theme"	2:17
9.	"Floating Bridge"	1:22
10.	"Hassle: The Dorkening"	2:23
11.	"Crime Spree"	1:52
12.	"Special Delivery"	1:57
13.	"Message No. 419"	3:32
14.	"I Heart Fags"	3:51
15.	"Braggadocio"	3:20
16.	"Indier Than Thou" (featuring Remy Auberjonois)	2:37

== Credits ==
- Andrew Griffin – drums
- Brandon "Blak Lotus" Patton – vocals, bass guitar, tuba
- Campbell Whyte – additional illustrations
- Dan "The Categorical Imperative" Thiel – drums
- Euclides "Yook" Pereyra – vocals
- Gabriel "Gminor7" Alter – keyboard, vocals
- John Nolt – cello
- Matt Steckler – saxophone
- Remy Auberjonois - Preacher voice
- Sean McArdle – guitar
- Tony Moore – cover illustration
