= My Boy (Saori@destiny song) =

Single by Saori@destiny

from the album Japanese Chaos
- B-side: "Our Telepathy"
- Released: December 5, 2007
- Recorded: 2007
- Genre: Electropop, bubblegum pop, vocal house
- Label: D-topia Independent
- Songwriters: Saori@destiny (lyrics); Miu (music)
- Producer: Onishi Terukado

Saori@destiny singles chronology
"My Boy" (2007)	"Sakura" (2008)

"My Boy" is the debut independent single of Japanese electronica singer Saori@destiny, released on December 5, 2007 on D-topia's independent subsidiary D-topia Independent. The single reached number 138 on the Oricon singles chart and only charted for one week.

== Background ==
"My Boy" is Saori@destiny's first original song, which she initially distributed through hand-made CD-Rs at her Akihabara street performances in the summer of 2007. In December she finally made her debut as an independent artist, and it was decided that her debut song would be "My Boy". The version released on the D-topia Independent label as the "original mix" is considerably slower than the actual original mix, and the "connects since mix" is closer in sound to the original song.

The Vocaloid software instrument "Hatsune Miku" was used to provide backing vocals for the re-recorded versions of "My Boy", three months after its release to the public.

This version of the song was used as a theme song for the MMORPG "Secret Online", and as an act of collaborative promotion, Saori@destiny attended several events for the game while dressed as its main character.

"My Boy" would later be recorded again, for the release of the album "JAPANESE CHAOS". The arrangement is largely unchanged from the D-topia Independent single, but Saori@destiny uses a new, breathier vocal styling which would go on to become her trademark sound.

Saori@destiny has also performed a more upbeat mix of the B-side, "Our Telepathy", but this has never been released.

== Track list ==
1. "My Boy" (original mix)
2. "Our Telepathy" (original mix)
3. "My Boy" (connects since mix)
4. "My Boy" (mp3 only Digital Mastering version)
5. "My Boy" (Instrumental)

== Chart performance ==
Chart	Peak position
Oricon Weekly singles chart	138
Oricon Independent singles chart	9
