= Solved (album) =

Studio album by MC Frontalot
- Released: August 23, 2011
- Recorded: 2011 at Twenty Five Efforts, Brooklyn, New York
- Genre: Nerdcore
- Length: 46:35
- Label: Level Up / Nerdcore Fervor
- Producers: MC Frontalot, Wheatus, Baddd Spellah

MC Frontalot chronology
Zero Day (2010)	Solved (2011)	Question Bedtime (2014)

Solved is the fifth studio album from nerdcore hip-hop artist MC Frontalot. It was released on August 23, 2011.

The first single, "Critical Hit", is available for free from the official website. The album's cover art was drawn by Evan Dorkin, with colors by Anthony Clark.

== Track listing ==
No.	Title	Length
1.	"Front the Least" (featuring Katrina Dideriksen)	2:52
2.	"Nerd Versus Jock"	1:06
3.	"Captains of Industry" (featuring MC Lars)	4:08
4.	"Critical Hit"	2:32
5.	"Problems: Ms. Schaal" (featuring Kristen Schaal)	1:50
6.	"Stoop Sale"	3:32
7.	"Victorian Space Prostitute" (featuring Gabrielle Aimée)	3:50
8.	"Invasion of the Not Quite Dead"	3:40
9.	"Problems: Mr. Cenac" (featuring Wyatt Cenac)	1:28
10.	"Power User" (featuring Molly Hager)	4:08
11.	"Colonel, Panic!"	3:18
12.	"I'll Form the Head" (featuring ZeaLouS1 and Dr. Awkward)	4:49
13.	"Solved" (featuring Katrina Dideriksen)	3:50
14.	"Problems: Mr. Mirman" (featuring Eugene Mirman)	1:25
15.	"Just Once"	3:24
