= Sam Brown (artist) =

American illustrator and author

Sam Brown, pseudonym of Adam Culbert, is an American illustrator and author most noted for his website, explodingdog. The gimmick of the site is that he draws pictures based on titles that visitors to the site send him via email or Twitter. He has also written two books of art and short stories, Wish For Something Better and Amazing Rain, based on the art of his website.

Most of Sam Brown's art is created in Adobe Photoshop on a Wacom tablet, although recently he has begun doing some drawings on paper. The fact that the art is produced on a computer is not readily apparent from viewing; other than occasional digital filters and transparency effects, the majority of the work is solid color-filled line drawings.

Recurrent themes in Sam Brown's art include dogs, fish, birds, robots, alien visitors, evil (portrayed as a green liquid), clouds, dictators and rockets, although he will never draw monkeys. His people have a distinctive appearance, their faces a plain circle with a line drawn across the middle for the mouth and two scribbled circles for eyes.

In 2007 Sam Brown became a member of the Dumbrella comic collective.

== In the news ==
- July 2001 Interview with The Morning News
- Three Imaginary Girls, July 2004
- gel talk, May 2003
- Austin Chronicle, March 2005
- Bostonist, July 2006
- "Street Cred". Wired. Vol. 8, no. 11. November 2000. p. 6. Archived from the original on October 24, 2012.
- Fairfield County Weekly July 21, 2005
- Daily Dot June 2, 2021
