= Question Bedtime =

Studio album by MC Frontalot
- Released: August 7, 2014
- Genre: Nerdcore
- Length: 37:54
- Producer: MC Frontalot

MC Frontalot chronology
Solved (2011)	Question Bedtime (2014)	Net Split, or the Fathomless Heartbreak of Online Itself (2019)

Question Bedtime is the sixth studio album from nerdcore hip-hop artist MC Frontalot. It was released on August 7, 2014.

The first single, "Much Chubbier", is available for free from the official website.

== Concept and production ==
The album is built around bedtime stories and was conceptualized as a children's album, containing no swear words. Interspersed throughout its runtime are spoken word tracks in which MC Frontalot takes the role of a babysitter attempting to put the child in his care to bed, while various comedians in the role of the child are uncooperative in the effort.

"Start Over" (based on the Little Red Riding Hood story) is partly the source of the album; it was written ten-years prior to recording for a charity album that was never finished. All song tracks are based on various folk tales and fables which are often used as bedtime stories. The stories upon which the songs are based include Little Red Riding Hood, The Story of the Three Bears, The Ruined Man Who Became Rich Again Through a Dream, The Emperor's New Clothes, The Master Maid, Three Billy Goats Gruff, The Story of the Youth Who Went Forth to Learn What Fear Was, the Japanese folk tale "The Ugly Son", The Stonecutter, and the Ho-Chunk tale "Wakjąkága". Most of these tales are given a specific spin, rather than being a straight retelling. For example, Gold Locks is not a sweet little girl, but a monstrous woman who hunts bears for fun, while the emperor in "I Can See" is an oppressive tyrant, dethroned in a revolution by the end of the song.

Guest artist MC Chris is cast in the role of the demon in the song "Devil in the Attic". This mirrors a role he occupied on The Graduate by MC Lars in which he plays Satan in the song "The Roommate from Hell".

== Track listing ==
No.	Title	Length
1.	"Bedtime For Li'l Kyle" (featuring Kyle Kinane)	0:41
2.	"Start Over"	3:27
3.	"Gold Locks" (featuring Jean Grae)	3:25
4.	"Two Dreamers"	2:51
5.	"I Can See" (featuring Adam WarRock and Sole)	3:34
6.	"Mornings Come and Go" (featuring Marian Call)	3:34
7.	"Bedtime for Li'l Paul" (featuring Paul F. Tompkins)	1:16
8.	"Much Chubbier" (featuring Open Mike Eagle)	3:45
9.	"Bedtime for Li'l Negin" (featuring Negin Farsad)	0:46
10.	"Shudders" (featuring Kid Koala and the Protomen)	4:03
11.	"Devil In the Attic" (featuring MC Chris)	3:48
12.	"Chisel Down" (featuring Busdriver and John Roderick)	2:26
13.	"Bedtime for Li'l Lisa" (featuring Lisa Delarios)	0:42
14.	"Wakjąkága" (featuring Parry Gripp)	3:27
