= Nerdcore Hiphop (album) =

Demo album by MC Frontalot
- Released: 2004
- Recorded: 1999–2004
- Genre: Nerdcore
- Label: Self-released

MC Frontalot chronology
Nerdcore Hiphop (2004)	Nerdcore Rising (2005)

Nerdcore Hiphop is a demo album by MC Frontalot, which first gave a name to the nerdcore genre, as well as the name of a song on that album. Because it was only released via the internet, the track listing is unordered, and includes tracks released from 1999 until his first commercial album, Nerdcore Rising, in 2005. The songs are therefore listed here in the order of which they were released. All listed songs are freely available for download through his website along with several remixes, mostly by Song Fight! regulars.

== Track listing ==
No.	Title	Length
1.	"Speed Queen"	1:55
2.	"Good Old Clyde"	1:57
3.	"Mountain Kind"	2:35
4.	"Nerdcore Hiphop"	2:30
5.	"Front the Most"	2:13
6.	"Rewind That Back"	1:59
7.	"Indier Than Thou"	2:37
8.	"Crime Spree"	2:04
9.	"Which MC Was That?"	3:14
10.	"Special Delivery"	1:45
11.	"Braggadocio"	3:17
12.	"I Heart Fags"	4:07
