= Jonathan Mann (musician) =

American singer-songwriter (born 1982)

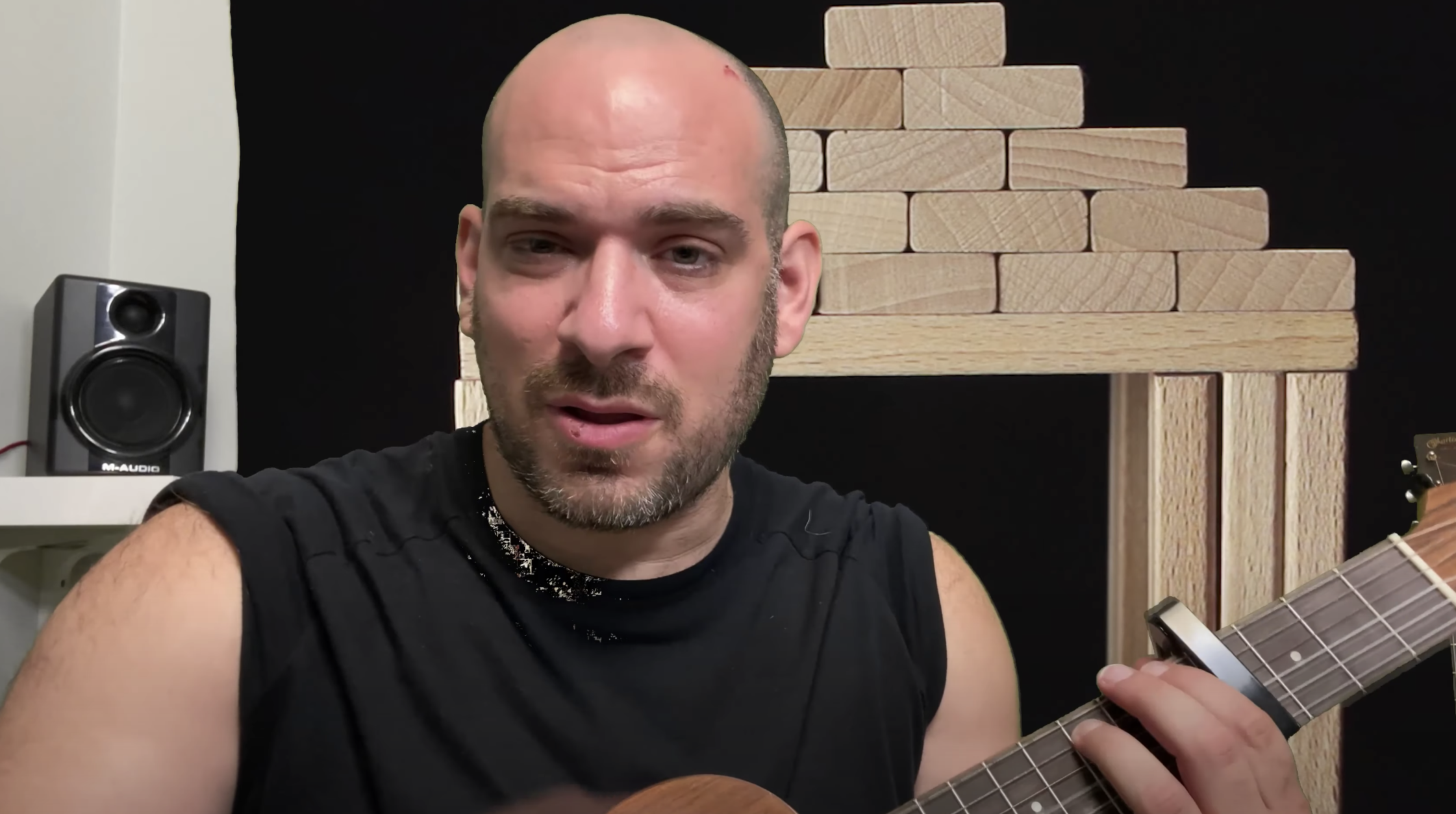
- Mann in August 2020

Background information
- Born: April 9, 1982 (age 44)
- Origin: Westford, Vermont
- Genres: Alternative rock, folk rock, freak folk
- Occupation: Singer-songwriter
- Instruments: Vocals, guitar
- Years active: 2005–present
- Website: jonathanmann.net

Jonathan Mann (born April 9, 1982) is an American singer-songwriter, best known for creating a song and video every day since January 2009. His songs often allude to news and popular trends of the very day he uploads them to his YouTube channel. In November 2014, Mann set a world record for the most consecutive days writing a song.

== Career ==
Mann started composing at the age of 12, before enrolling at Bennington College. While pursuing his graduate studies at CalArts, he co-wrote and starred in a rock opera called "The Last Nympho Leprechaun" with colleague Thomas Hughes. In grad school, he wrote and starred in a rock opera based on Super Mario Brothers. Since then, he has recorded music and self-released albums under the names Forty (or 40) Second Songs, The Nympho Leprechauns, Novox the Robot, GameJew, and The Mario Opera, as well as simply Jonathan Mann.

In 2006, Mann started uploading videos to YouTube under the alias "GameJew." He later started his best-known project, "Song A Day," which has been continuously operating since January 1, 2009. The project came to US national attention following several viral hits and a CNN interview.

From 2006 to 2012, Jonathan lived in the San Francisco Bay Area, where he formed and performed with a band called The Rock Cookie Bottoms. After many personnel changes, the group's membership solidified around 2009 with keyboardist Pete Feltman, singer Nic Kaelin, bassist Eric Yeargan, guitarist Sam Douglass, and drummer Sparky Grinstead (who went by the name Norman Famous). A singer-songwriter with his own career, Grinstead was a fan of Mann's work and provided the band with a studio and much of its equipment. They were often joined onstage by Grinstead's son, Oakland-based multi-instrumentalist Matthew Joseph Payne. The band broke up in 2012 when Jonathan left for New York.

In July 2012, Mann produced "Song a Day: The Album". He invited colleagues from around the world to interact with performers and contribute to compositions via livestream. Then he recorded the songs at Famous House, Grinstead's home studio in Berkeley, California. Members of the Rock Cookie Bottoms made cameo appearances on the album, as did "fluffy," a long-time participant in Song Fight!. The album was co-produced with Nick Krill and Thomas Hughes of the Spinto Band.

In June 2014, Mann released his 2,000th song and did a Reddit AMA ("Ask Me Anything"), creating songs as answers to the questions and a tribute "Song a Day" video on YouTube.

Mann contributes to the music on the Night Vales Presents podcast "Sleep With Me", presented by Andrew Ackerman.

== Personal life ==
Mann married in January 2014. Mann's duet with his ex-girlfriend about their breakup became one of his viral hits.

== Notable compositions ==
- As GameJew, Mann (wearing a Mario costume) sought out and sang a tribute to Nintendo luminary Shigeru Miyamoto during the 2007 Game Developers Conference. This act of fandom was widely reported by the gaming press, and reference was made to it in the comic strip FoxTrot.
- "The iPhone Antenna Song," was played by Apple CEO Steve Jobs at the start of the iPhone 4 press conference.
- The commercial tune "Bing Goes the Internet" won a jingle contest sponsored by Microsoft Bing, yet was deemed "the worst jingle in the world" by the website Techcrunch.
- "Hey, Paul Krugman!," a song dedicated to economist Paul Krugman, was performed live on the Rachel Maddow Show.
- Mann composed the official theme to the 2011 TEDMED conference, and debuted it as the conference's keynote speaker. Mann performed at the 2012 TEDMED conference as well.
- "Baby Yoda Baby Baby Yoda" is Mann's most viewed song on YouTube. This song is based on the viral sensation Grogu from the Disney+ series The Mandalorian.

== Discography ==
- Animals (2014)
- Song A Day: Year Five (2013)
- Song A Day: Year Four (2012)
- Song A Day: The Album (2012)
- Song A Day: Year Three (2011)
- Song A Day: The Album (2011)
- Song A Day: Year Two (2011)
- Song A Day: Year One (2010)
- Barefoot in the Family Tree EP (2009)
- Tonight I'm Gonna Shave My Head (2007)
- The Mushroom Singdom Vol. 0–3 (2007)
- The Mario Opera: Acts 2 + 3 Demos (2006)
- The Mario Opera: Act 1 (demos) (2005)
- Songs for Girls (2005)
- There Are So Many Possibilities (2004)
- I've Got A Bigger Radio (2004)
- Novox The Robot (2004)
