= Nerdcore Rising (film) =

- Directed by: Negin Farsad; Kimmy Gatewood
- Produced by: Kimmy Gatewood; Andrew Mendelson
- Starring: Damian Hess
- Cinematography: Brendan Kennedy
- Edited by: Andrew Mendelson
- Release date: March 9, 2008
- Running time: 80 minutes
- Country: United States
- Language: English

Nerdcore Rising is a documentary/concert film starring MC Frontalot and other nerdcore hip hop artists such as MC Chris, Wheelie Cyberman of Optimus Rhyme and MC Lars, with contributors from artists such as "Weird Al" Yankovic, Prince Paul, and Brian Posehn. The film, directed and produced by Negin Farsad, was premiered at the 2008 South by Southwest festival in Austin, Texas. It combines interviews about nerdcore and its origins with footage of MC Frontalot's 2006 Nerdcore Rising national tour.

== Film content ==
The film investigates the nerdcore genre of hip-hop music, following the godfather of the genre, MC Frontalot, nerdcore's 'poet laureate', on his first national tour, in the company of band-mates Gaby Alter ("G Minor 7"), the keyboard player; Strugis the drummer and 'flirt of the band'; and Brandon Patton ("Blak Lotus"), the bass guitarist.

Beginning in South Carolina and culminating at the Penny Arcade Expo in Seattle, masses of fans across the country come out to hear Frontalot's music as he strives to achieve mainstream success. Behind the scenes, relationships among Frontalot and his band are challenged by their experiences on the road. Frontalot and Alter, are childhood friends, and both met Patton in college. Strugis, tries to fit in as the new member and Brandon, is a taskmaster in Sturgis.

Throughout the film, music industry notables provide insight into Nerdcore. Old school trailblazers like Prince Paul and contemporary hip hop aficionados like J-Live examine the legitimacy of nerdcore as a subgenre of hip hop. Celebrities like "Weird Al" Yankovic discuss the origins of nerdcore while Penny Arcade creators Mike Krahulik and Jerry Holkins, expounding on the digital revolution that is enabling the nerdcore movement.

== Reception ==
Reviews of this documentary are generally favourable. Mel Valentin of Slash Film described it as "an engrossing documentary directed by Negin Farsad, [that] will answer any and all questions you may have about nerdcore, a relatively new hip-hop genre made by and for nerds." Paul Bower of "Tiny Mixed Tapes" concluded "With the added benefit of interviews with artists like Prince Paul, "Weird Al" Yankovic, and Jello Biafra, Nerdcore Rising serves as an entertaining yet fluffy documentary about one of the most laughably interesting forms of musical expression in the West."

== DVD release ==
The DVD of Nerdcore Rising was sold in limited release in August 2008. It was sold for the first time at the 2008 Penny Arcade Expo in Seattle. It was released widely on 15 September 2009.
