= Zero Day (album) =

Studio album by MC Frontalot
- Released: April 6, 2010
- Recorded: 2009 at Twenty Five Efforts, Brooklyn, New York
- Genre: Nerdcore
- Length: 45:08
- Label: Level Up / Nerdcore Fervor
- Producers: MC Frontalot, Baddd Spellah, Nate Van iLL, Wheatus

MC Frontalot chronology
Final Boss (2008)	Zero Day (2010)	Solved (2011)

Zero Day is the fourth studio album from nerdcore hip-hop artist MC Frontalot. It was released on April 6, 2010. The first single, "Your Friend Wil", is available for free from the official website. The album's cover art was drawn by Jhonen Vasquez.

== Track listing ==
No.	Title	Length
1.	"Zero Day" (featuring Dual Core, YTCracker and Jane Silence)	4:22
2.	"Charisma Potion"	3:43
3.	"Jacquelyn Hyde" (featuring Ken Flagg)	3:28
4.	"Your Friend Wil" (featuring Mike Doughty)	2:32
5.	"The Tribulations of Muffy and Percival" (featuring Sara Benincasa)	1:36
6.	"First World Problem"	3:24
7.	"Disaster" (featuring Schäffer the Darklord and Beefy)	3:21
8.	"Everyone's a Critic"	0:25
9.	"A Little Bit Broad"	3:27
10.	"Spoiler Alert" (featuring Molly Hager)	3:23
11.	"80085"	4:09
12.	"Question and Answer Time" (featuring John Hodgman)	2:08
13.	"Better at Rapping" (featuring Mr. B The Gentleman Rhymer)	3:05
14.	"The Council of Loathing"	2:52
15.	"Front the Most"	2:14
16.	"Painstakingly Concealed Secret Track"	0:59

== Secret track ==
The album's last track ("Painstakingly Concealed Secret Track") is the key to a puzzle which leads to a hidden track. To congratulate the 56 fans who solved the puzzle before the album was officially released, a game ladder page was erected on the official website listing each fan's initials.
