= World Wild 2010 =

WORLD WILD 2010

Studio album by Saori@destiny
- Released: April 14, 2010
- Recorded: 2009–2010
- Genre: J-pop; electropop; electro; synthpop; dance
- Length: 43:30
- Language: Japanese
- Label: D-topia; Victor
- Producer: Terukado Onishi

Saori@destiny chronology
Wow War Techno (2010)	WORLD WILD 2010 (2010)	Domestic Domain (2011)

Singles from World Wild 2010
- 1. "Ethnic Planet Survival" Released: January 20, 2010; 2. "Lonely Lonely Lonely" Released: February 17, 2010

World Wild 2010 (World Wild two-o-one-zero, stylized all caps) is the second studio album by Japanese electronica singer-lyricist Saori@destiny. The album was released in Japan on April 14, 2010 by D-topia Entertainment. The album charted and peaked at its debut position of number 35 in Oricon daily charts and number 129 in Oricon weekly charts, selling 812 copies, though the album only charted for a week, making it her highest-charting release yet. This is Saori@destiny's current highest selling album.

On June 30, 2010, the album was made available through iTunes internationally, making World Wild 2010 the first ever D-topia album to be released and distributed worldwide.

== Background ==
WORLD WILD 2010 marks a change in Saori@destiny's previously-established musical style by incorporating foreign genres of dance music. Brazilian funk carioca and Indonesian funkot were advertised in the album's tagline, and greater emphasis is placed on organic instrument sounds.

The decision to release the album globally through iTunes was taken by Saori's management after she received a message from an international Saori@destiny fan community via Mixi.

== Legacy ==
Labelmate Aira Mitsuki covered the songs "I Can't" and "Grotesque" as bonus CD tracks for her first EP, 6 Force, which was released a couple of months after World Wild 2010. The former is only available in a bonus CD sold at Tower Records, the latter at HMV.

Despite changing stage names a couple of times, Saori still performs the song "I Can't" at her one-man live concerts as of 2023.

== Track listing ==
No.	Title	Length
1.	"Re:revolution"	0:42
2.	"World Wild 2010"	2:36
3.	"Ethnic Planet Survival" (エスニック・プラネット・サバイバル)	3:59
4.	"I can't"	5:07
5.	"Lonely Lonely Lonely"	3:22
6.	"Play"	3:03
7.	"BABY tell me"	3:44
8.	"Funny Parade" (ファニー・パレード)	3:22
9.	"Grotesque" (グロテスク)	3:26
10.	"Prism" (プリズム)	3:53
11.	"Sympa" (シンパ; Sympathy)	3:16
12.	"Lonely Lonely Lonely" (FUNKOT.JP remix) Remixed by DJ Jet Barong a.k.a. 政所 (Mandokoro)	6:54

== Charts ==
Chart	Peak position
Oricon Daily albums	35
Oricon Weekly albums	129

== Sales and certifications ==
Chart	Amount
Oricon physical sales	1,000

== Release history ==
Region	Date	Format	Distributing label
Japan	April 14, 2010	CD, digital download	Victor Entertainment
Worldwide	June 30, 2010	Digital download	D-topia
