= Sakura (Saori@destiny song) =

2008 song by Saori@destiny

Single by Saori@destiny

from the album Japanese Chaos
- B-side: "Sayonara Revival"
- Released: March 26, 2008 (Japan)
- Recorded: 2008
- Genre: J-pop; electro house; dance-pop
- Label: D-topia; Victor; Avex-I
- Songwriter(s): Kyogo Kawaguchi
- Producer(s): Onishi Terukado

Saori@destiny singles chronology
"My Boy" (2007)	"Sakura" (2008)	"Wow War Techno" (2009)

Audio sample
- file; help

"Sakura" is the debut major single (second overall) of Japanese singer Saori@destiny, released on March 26, 2008, in Japan by D-topia Entertainment. The title track is a cover of Kyogo Kawaguchi's song of the same name. The single debuted and peaked at number 108 in the Oricon charts.

== Track listing ==
CD tracks
No.	Title	Lyrics	Music	Arrangement	Length
1.	"Sakura"	Kawaguchi Kyogo	Kyogo	Discotica2oooo6969
2.	"Sayonara Revival" (サヨナラリヴァイバル Sayonara Rivaibaru)	Saori@destiny	To-West, Miu	Discotica2oooo6969
3.	"Destiny's War" (connects since mix)	Saori@destiny	Miu	Hammer franky
4.	"Sakura" (mp3 only Digital Mastering version)	Kyogo	Kyogo	Discotica2oooo6969
5.	"Sayonara Revival" (instrumental)		To West, Miu	Discotica2oooo6969

== Chart performance ==
Chart	Peak position
Oricon Weekly singles chart	108
