= Explodingdog =

Website

explodingdog was the name of a website run by Sam Brown, pseudonym of Adam Culbert. From 2000 to 2015, viewers e-mailed Brown short phrases for inspiration and he illustrated certain ones. The drawings were usually rendered digitally and are known for their simplistic style, and their poignant and sometimes unexpected take on the phrases on which they are based. Sam Brown has published limited-run print books of his explodingdog illustrations.

== Webcomics ==
- Whispered Apologies — An inversion of the explodingdog format in which artists submit comics to the site, and writers give the submitted comics text.
- Diesel Sweeties – Traditional webcomic
- NatalieDee – Daily webcomic

== Music sites ==
- Song Fight! — Originally started as a musical explodingdog spinoff, now a songwriting contest between multiple artists.
