= Final Boss (album) =

2008 album by MC Frontalot

Studio album by MC Frontalot
- Released: November 4, 2008
- Genre: Nerdcore
- Length: 39:00
- Labels: Level Up Records and Tapes / Nerdcore Fervor
- Producers: MC Frontalot, Baddd Spellah, Nate Van iLL

MC Frontalot chronology
Secrets from the Future (2007)	Final Boss (2008)	Zero Day (2010)

Final Boss is the third studio album from nerdcore hip-hop artist MC Frontalot. It was released on November 4, 2008. The first single, "Wallflowers", is available to listen to at his website, as well as the title track Final Boss, and Diseases of Yore.

"Final Boss" is composed mostly of new material but does include two remakes from before Nerdcore Rising ("Listen Close" and "A Very Unlikely Occurrence").

The front cover art for the album was done by Scott Campbell. Back cover by Dennis Hansbury. Design by Suchascream.net.

== Track listing ==
No.	Title	Length
1.	"Wallflowers"	3:03
2.	"Tongue-Clucking Grammarian"	3:02
3.	"Shame of the Otaku" (featuring Rai Kamishiro)	3:50
4.	"Canadia" (featuring Jesse Dangerously and Wordburglar)	3:20
5.	"The AM Radio Skit" (featuring Schaffer the Darklord)	1:26
6.	"Scare Goat" (featuring Glen Phillips)	3:50
7.	"Diseases of Yore" (featuring Jonathan Coulton)	3:18
8.	"Black Box" (featuring Random)	3:44
9.	"A Very Unlikely Occurrence"	0:59
10.	"In Arrears"	2:56
11.	"Listen Close"	2:22
12.	"A Skit About Vocations" (featuring Wil Wheaton)	1:46
13.	"Socks On" (featuring Katrina Dideriksen)	2:10
14.	"Final Boss"	3:18

== Personnel ==
- Damian Hess - Rapping, Lyrics, Drum Programming
- Jesse McDonald - Lyrics
- Sean Jordan - Lyrics, Vocals
- Glen Phillips - Lyrics
- Jonathan Coulton - Lyrics, Vocals, Guitar
- Raheem Jarbo - Lyrics
- DJ Snyder - Scratching
- GM7 - Keyboards
- Baddd Spellah - Keyboards, Drum Programming, Engineering
- Kimmy Gatewood - Vocals
- Katrina Dideriksen - Vocals
- Rai Kamishiro - Vocals, Translation
- Daisuke Kōzuki - Translation
- The Categorical Imperative - Drums
- Jesse Dangerously - Guest Rapper
- Wordburglar - Guest Rapper
- The Sturgenius - Drums
- Fay Ferency - Cello
- John Nolt - Cello
- Nate Van iLL - Percussion
