= 6 Force =

6 FORCE
- regular / normal edition cover

EP by Mitsuki Aira
- Released: June 2, 2010 (Japan)
- Genres: Pop, rock, electropop, electronica, dance
- Length: 35 minutes
- Label: D-topia / Victor / Avex-I
- Producers: Onishi Terukado, SAWAGI

Mitsuki Aira chronology
Plastic (2009)	6 FORCE (2010)	??? (2010)

Alternative cover

6 Force is the first mini album (third overall) of electronica singer-lyricist Aira Mitsuki. It was released on June 2, 2010 in Japan by D-topia Entertainment, and is her last release under the label. It reached #11 on the Oricon Daily charts and #34 on the Oricon Weekly charts, where it charted for two weeks, selling 3,391 copies. The mini-album marks Aira's experimentation with rock music, such that half (Fake, Level5 and Turkey) of the mini-album didn't much involve the characteristic use of autotune and vocoders and are in a new-wave rock style, showing Aira's true voice for the first time.

The album comes in with a bonus disc upon purchase in either Tower Records or HMV containing either tracks "I can't" and "Grotesque" respectively, which are covers from labelmate Saori@destiny's second full-length album, World Wild 2010. However, the Tower Records' version of the album, specifically its bonus disc, is rare to be seen as of now, and is sought after by fans.

== Track list ==
All songs are produced by Onishi Terukado except for "Fake," "Level5," and "Turkey", which are produced by rock band SAWAGI, marking this record the first time that Aira was not fully produced by Terukado himself. "Heat My Love" and "Level5" are the album's promotional singles.

1. Heat My Love (3:23)
2. Wonder Touch (4:48)
3. Lie Days (3:52)
4. Yellow Submarine (3:44) (limited edition)
  Display Toy (regular edition)
5. Fake (4:48)
6. Level5 (6:00)
7. Turkey (5:02)

HMV bonus disc

1. Grotesque (3:29)

Tower Records bonus disc

1. I Can't
