= Domestic Domain =

EP by Saori@destiny
- Released: June 15, 2011 (Japan / Worldwide)
- Recorded: 2011
- Genre: Dance
- Length: 24:17
- Language: Japanese
- Label: D-Topia Universe
- Producer: Terukado Onishi

Saori@destiny chronology
World Wild 2010 (2010)	Domestic Domain (2011)	×～PARK OF THE SAFARI (2011)

Domestic Domain (stylized as Domestic domain) is the second EP by Japanese electronica singer-lyricist Saori@destiny, released on June 15, 2011 under D-Topia Universe with distribution to be done by Universal Music Japan. This is Saori's first release from the label. The album debuted and peaked at the No. 176 spot in the Oricon albums chart for a week, however, ranking lower than her previous full-length album World Wild 2010.

The track "Beatbop" is used in Attas3 Golf Club CM in September 2011.

== Background ==
Various Japanese record stores announced starting from April 2011 about a new Saori@destiny release to hit record shelves on June 15. Her official website was updated with a new design and released a preview of a track from the upcoming EP called BEATBOP on May 17, 2011. Saori then posted on her official Twitter account on May 23, 2011 that the recording for the EP has been concluded.

== Track listing ==
All lyrics written by Saori@destiny.

No.	Title	Music	Length
1.	"Beatbop"	Alex Funk It	2:36
2.	"Domestic domain"	Alex Funk It	4:38
3.	"Gamba Japan"	Alex Funk It, To-West	4:10
4.	"Collage"	To-West	5:05
5.	"Off The Wall"	Nexx Works	3:20
6.	"Pray"	Alex Funk It	3:53
7.	"Klaxon"	G. Rina	3:32

== Charts ==
Chart	Peak position
Oricon Weekly albums	176
