= Three Questions =

???
- CD only cover

Studio album by Mitsuki Aira
- Released: November 17, 2010
- Recorded: 2010
- Genre: J-pop; electropop
- Length: 45:03
- Language: Japanese
- Label: D-Topia Universe, Universal Music Japan
- Producer: Terukado Onishi, Han Jae-ho, Kim Seung-su, An Jun-sung

Mitsuki Aira chronology
6 Force (2010)	??? (2010)	×～PARK OF THE SAFARI (2011)

Singles from ???
- 1. "Aishi Aisarete Ikiru no sa" Released: October 13, 2010 (digital download); 2. "Why Two?" Released: October 20, 2010 (digital download)

Three Questions (stylized as ??? (スリークエスチョン, Surii Kuesuchon)) is the third studio album by Japanese electronica singer Mitsuki Aira, released on November 17, 2010, in Japan by D-Topia Universe with distribution by Universal Music Japan. The album includes songs that were previously unreleased. This is also the first album to be released under D-topia Entertainment's new label, D-Topia Universe. The promotional singles for the album were "Aishi Aisarete Ikiru no Sa" and "Why Two?". The album peaked at the number 45 position on the Oricon weekly charts, selling a total of 2,758 copies.

The album contains a cover of a Kenji Ozawa song, "Aishi Aisarete Ikiru no Sa" and the album's closing track, "Love Re:", which was written and produced by Korean producers Han Jae-Ho, Kim Seung-Su, and An Jung-Sung, who also produce songs for South Korean girl group Kara. Motohiro Kawashima, a composer best known for his work on the Streets of Rage game series, co-composed the track "Human Future" under the pen name Kashii.

== Track listing ==
The CD only version includes the original track "Last Love" but in the CD+DVD version, the track "Rainbow" replaces "Last Love" on track seven.

=== CD+DVD / Limited edition ===
No.	Title	Lyrics	Music	Translation	Length
1.	"Train Train" (feat. Tamaki ROY)	Mitsuki Aira, Tamaki Roy	Kampkin Malkee		4:03
2.	"321"	Mitsuki Aira	Alex Funk It		3:37
3.	"Aishi Aisarete Ikiru no Sa"	Kenji Ozawa	Kenji Ozawa	Love Is What We Need	5:00
4.	"Why Two?"	Mitsuki Aira	Alex Funk It		4:02
5.	"Rainy Tone" (Interlude)	--	Nexx Works		1:13
6.	"Human Future"	Mitsuki Aira	Kylie & Kashii		3:30
7.	"Rainbow"	Mitsuki Aira	Nexx Works		3:39
8.	"Parameter"	Mitsuki Aira	To-West		4:42
9.	"???" (Three Questions)	Mitsuki Aira	Kampkin Malkee		4:06
10.	"Fly"	To-West	To-West, Nexx Works		3:59
11.	"Smile"	Mitsuki Aira	Alex Funk It		3:17
12.	"Love Re:"	Mitsuki Aira	Han Jae Ho, Kim Seung Soo, An Jung Sung		3:56

=== CD only / Normal edition ===
No.	Title	Length
7.	"last love"	4:21

=== DVD ===
1. Aishi Aisarete Ikiru no sa (Music Clip)
2. Aishi Aisarete Ikiru no sa (Music Clip Making)
3. Why Two? (Music Clip)
4. Why Two? (Music Clip Making)

== Charts ==
Chart	Peak position
Oricon Daily albums	16
Oricon Weekly albums	45

== Sales and certifications ==
Chart	Amount
Oricon physical sales	3,000

== Release history ==
Region	Date	Format	Distributing label
Japan	November 17, 2010	CD, CD+DVD, digital download	Universal Music Japan
South Korea	August 19, 2011	Digital download	Universal Music Korea
