= MC Hawking =

- Also known as: MC Hawking, The Hawkman
- Born: Ken Lawrence
- Genres: Nerdcore
- Occupations: Rapper, songwriter, producer
- Instrument: Text-to-speech program
- Labels: Brash Music
- MC Hawking's voice DECtalk demo of the synthesiser for Stephen Hawking; DECtalk demo.flac

Ken Lawrence is a nerdcore rapper who purports to be the late theoretical physicist Stephen Hawking rapping under the name MC Hawking.

MC Hawking rose to popularity on the Internet in the early 2000s. The songs were originally released in MP3 format, but due to the popularity of the website Lawrence was signed to a record deal with Brash Music to release a "greatest hits" album in 2004.

== Background ==
MC Hawking's entire body of work and his rapper persona were created by American web developer Ken Lawrence. Lawrence earned a degree in music composition from Hampshire College. His raps are synthesized by the text-to-speech program WillowTalk. The beats for MC Hawking are provided by DJ Doomsday (another alter-ego of Ken Lawrence). The beats are a combination of samples of classic hip hop tracks, commercial royalty-free loop libraries, live performances, and midi compositions.

=== Lyrical content ===
The lyrics are a mixture of gangsta rap topics, science topics and Stephen Hawking quotations (such as the famous "When I hear of Schrödinger's cat, I reach for my gun", which became "Every time I think of them my trigger finger itches", referring to creationists). Among subjects of MC Hawking songs are various scientific topics and Hawking's professional relationships with MIT rivals, as well as the standard fare of gangsta rap, including street violence and drug use.

The lyrics display insight into many aspects of current scientific thought, Newton's laws of motion ("All My Shootings Be Drivebys"), Einstein's theory of relativity ("E=MC Hawking"), the Big Bang ("The Big Bizang"), Thermodynamics ("Entropy"), and quantum physics subjects such as Schrödinger's cat and the wave function collapse ("Rock Out With Your Hawk Out").

The creation evolution controversy is also mentioned in "Fuck the Creationists" and "Entropy".

=== Dark Matter and greatest hits album ===
He is also involved with a heavy metal group called Dark Matter — a parody of Ice-T's "Body Count" — with whom he has performed such songs as "Why Won't Jesse Helms Just Hurry Up and Die", "UFT for the MC" (a parody of the Sex Pistols song "Anarchy in the UK"), and "The Big Bizang". He is also an occasional Song Fight! participant.

His "greatest hits" album is called A Brief History of Rhyme: MC Hawking's Greatest Hits, a parody of Hawking's book A Brief History of Time. It included many songs that were available on the official website, plus new material (four songs and three interludes from a fictional radio interview).

=== Reaction by Stephen Hawking ===
Stephen Hawking said in 2000 that he was "flattered, as it's a modern-day equivalent to Spitting Image". On the inside cover of A Brief History of Rhyme, Lawrence thanks Stephen Hawking "for taking this joke in the spirit that it was intended."

=== MC Hawking's Podcore Nerdcast ===
In 2013, Lawrence, along with longtime collaborators Len Pal and the voice actor Dave B. Mitchell, launched MC Hawking's Podcore Nerdcast, a podcast in which the hosts discuss movies, games, books, and music (and particularly nerdcore hip hop). as well as interviews with nerdcore musicians including MC Frontalot, MC Lars, Random, and Atheist (Scott Knopf). In June 2014, Cassie joined the cast to fill in for Mitchell (due to scheduling conflicts). Regular features include Will It Suck, in which the hosts discuss upcoming films and predict opening weekend box office and Rotten Tomatoes results, Dino News, in which Cassie brings the latest news about dinosaurs, Nerds Need to Know, which highlights books, movies, or television shows relevant to nerd culture, and Everybody Wants to Rule the World, in which the hosts debate potential new laws or decrees that could make the world a better place. Episodes occasionally also feature new MC Hawking tracks. The podcast has been inactive since 2018.

=== Upcoming second album ===
His second album, The Hawkman Returneth, was due for release in 2018, announced with the release of the single Fear of a Black Hole, which was first performed in 2016 in front of the real Stephen Hawking and others including Richard Dawkins and Brian May. As of 2023, no additional music has been released.

== Discography ==
- A Brief History of Rhyme: MC Hawking's Greatest Hits (2004)
  1. "The Hawkman Cometh"
  2. "The Dozens"
  3. "Big Bizang"
  4. "Excerpt from a Radio Interview (Pt. 1)"
  5. "Entropy"
  6. "The Mighty Stephen Hawking"
  7. "Crazy as Fuck"
  8. "Bitchslap (With MC Frontalot)"
  9. "Excerpt from a Radio Interview (Pt. 2)"
  10. "Fuck the Creationists"
  11. "E=MC Hawking"
  12. "All My Shootings Be Drivebys"
  13. "UFT For The MC"
  14. "Excerpt from a Radio Interview (Pt. 3)"
  15. "What We Need More of is Science"
  16. "GTA3"
- Songs released in MP3 format only
  - "Led Zeppelin Medley" (no longer available)
  - "QuakeMaster"
  - "Why Won't Jesse Helms Just Hurry Up and Die?"
  - "Rock Out with Your Hawk Out"
  - "MC Hawking Holiday"
  - "How I Roll"
- Appearances

- "Nerdcore Rising" - MC Frontalot - Nerdcore Rising

== Fictional discography ==
As part of the parody, a fictional discography was created on the MC Hawking's Crib website. None of these albums were actually created.

- The Hawkman Cometh EP (1994)
- [Fear of a Black Hole] (1996) (originally called A Brief History of Rhyme until Hawking's real album was given that title)
- E = MC Hawking (1999)
