= Song Fight! =

Weekly online songwriting and recording competition

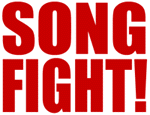
The traditional Song Fight! logo. The new logos now fit color schemes, varying between concurrent fights.

Song Fight! is a weekly online songwriting and recording competition in which amateur artists are openly invited to participate. Traditionally, a title and deadline are posted each week for which participants write, record, and submit a song in MP3 format. All entries are compiled at the end of the week and links to the files are displayed on the front page for public voting, which lasts until the end of the next week. All visitors to the site are able to listen to the MP3s and are permitted one vote each. At the end of this voting period, results are posted and the next cycle (or "fight") begins, meaning at any given time one fight is in the works (in that a deadline and title are available) while the previous fight is in its voting stage. Typically Song Fight! involves only one fight at a time, although in the past several have taken place simultaneously.

Winning earns you no more or less than "bragging rights, satisfaction, [and] the jealous glances of strangers sitting next to you on the subway." Nonetheless, the site has inspired well over a thousand artists to enter since the competition's inception.

All songs submitted to Song Fight! are free for download, and are catalogued and hosted indefinitely.

== History ==
The original "Fightmaster," Collin "Narbotic" Cunningham, had a site on the Dumbrella network where, similar to explodingdog, he accepted submissions of song titles and would record a song based on that title.

Song Fight! began when Cunningham declared its first fight title, "Golfpunk Drives a Cadillac" on June 19, 2000. Song Fight! was not open to the public for the first several fights, and was at this time populated mainly by Cunningham's friends and internet acquaintances. The first public fight was the seventh, "Zero to Phantom" (January 4, 2001). This was also the fight that first featured now "internet-famous" artist KOMPRESSOR, often considered Song Fight!'s first musical personality to become widely notable outside the community. While host Cunningham/Narbotic was a regularly featured artist during this time, none of his entries received the most votes in a fight.

During these years, the Song Fight! community made its home on the Dumbrella message boards, also home to the forums of prominent webcomics Achewood, Wigu, Diesel Sweeties and Explodingdog, among others. In July 2001 the first official performance of Song Fight! artists was collected for the first "Song Fight Live!" at Hot Lunch in San Francisco, California. A highlight of the evening included an impromptu songwriting contest, in which contestants created songs on the fly to the title of the venue's name.

On May 10, 2002, a new title was announced: "Postcard". The deadline came, and passed. Months went by without an update. As the fighters became restless, "side-fights" began to spring up on private sites, the most prominent of them held by participant "Spud" of prolific Song Fight! ensemble Octothorpe. Known as "Mean While!", this side-contest eventually became more regular and (as a result) more attractive than waiting for an update from the original. Narbotic updated one full month after the announcement of "Postcard" with optimistically titled "The Return", the entries from which were never actually posted.

Mean While!'s administrator, in conjunction with participant "JB" of the one-man John Benjamin Band, moved the contest to SongFight.org, asking Cunningham to create a redirect to that location from SongFight.com, the original address, a request that was eventually granted. JB, having previously purchased the rights to the .net and .org addresses to protect them from squatters (and to begin a Song Fight! webring at the .net location), agreed to host the site while Spud became responsible for the code and aspects of the site's upkeep and administration. The two now officially host and help to administer Song Fight! in cooperation, though the source of the titles is repeatedly said to be an unknown individual called only "Deep Throat", a tongue-in-cheek reference to the famous informant from the Watergate scandal. Songs from Mean While! (beginning June 28, 2002) have now been incorporated into the Song Fight! archives, along with all entries from Narbotic's period of administration.

== Song Fight! Live ==
"Song Fight! Live" events happen annually in the United States. "Song Fight! Presents" (official and semi-official) shows have been performed on both coasts of the United States, in Great Britain and Australia.

- July 7, 2001 - Song Fight! Live West Coast in San Francisco, California.
- June 28, 2002 - Song Fight! Plain & Tall in Lancaster, Pennsylvania.
- July 26, 2003 - Song Fight! Wet & Wild in Seattle, Washington.
- June 18–19, 2004 - Song Fight! Hot & Bothered in Austin, Texas.
- August 12–13, 2005 - Song Fight! Sox & Rock in Boston, Massachusetts.
- August 18–19, 2006 - Song Fight! High & Dry in Santa Cruz, California.
- August 16–18, 2007 - Song Fight! Rebels & Trebles in Atlanta, Georgia.
- August 15–18, 2008 - Song Fight! Hot & Sweaty in Tampa, Florida.
- July 17–18, 2009 - Song Fight! Rock & Rocker in Spokane, Washington.
- July 17–18, 2010 - Song Fight! Love & Haight in San Francisco, California.
- June 11–12, 2011 - Song Fight! Yanks & Banks in New York, New York.
- July 13–14, 2012 - Song Fight! Beer & Coffee in Seattle, Washington.
- August 9–10, 2013 - Song Fight! Weird & Wired in Austin, Texas.
- August 15–16, 2014 - Song Fight! Feds &Shreds in Washington, D.C.
- August 14–15, 2015 - Song Fight! Wiccans & Chickens in Portland, Oregon
- July 16–17, 2016 - Song Fight! Touch & Go in New York, New York
- September 15–16, 2017 - Song Fight! Foodies & Hoodies in Berkeley, California
- August 10–11, 2018 - Song Fight! Beers & Beards & Bears in Denver, Colorado
- August 2–3, 2019 - Song Fight! Curds & Chords in Madison, Wisconsin
- July 19–20, 2024 - Song Fight! Mountains & Melodies in Denver, Colorado
- August 8–9, 2025 - Song Fight! Five & Twenty in Seattle, Washington

From 2020 thru 2023, due to the COVID-19 pandemic and ongoing difficulties with organizing live shows, the Song Fight! Live events have been hosted online, with archives hosted on the Song Fight! YouTube channel.

== Current status ==
As of mid-2025, Song Fight! has conducted more than 1,000 fights and is host to more than 14,000 entries.

"Cover art" is also accepted for each fight, though it is not a separate "art fight" in that no voting process occurs. The submission of fight art is considered more of a service than a competition. Fight art is a reference to the earliest days of Song Fight!, when Explodingdog artist Sam Brown produced much of the artwork for each week's fight. There is also an archive of all submitted artwork.

== Notable participants ==
The following artists originated on, or have participated in Song Fight!.

- Brad Sucks
- KOMPRESSOR
- MC Frontalot (has also entered as Urine Luck and Rapper Name Redacted, and was the lead singer of Duboce Triangle and Milwaukee Youth Center Choir)
- MC Hawking
- The Spinto Band (as Carol Cleveland Sings)
- Duncan Pflaster (as Level Nivelo)
- Jonathan Mann
- State Shirt
