= Copy (album) =

C.O.P.Y

Studio album by Mitsuki Aira
- Released: September 8, 2008
- Recorded: 2008
- Genres: J-pop; electropop
- Label: D-topia Entertainment
- Producer: Terukado Ōnishi

Mitsuki Aira chronology
C.O.P.Y (2008)	Plastic (2009)

Singles from Copy
- 1. "Colorful Tokyo Sounds No.9 (カラフル・トーキョーサウンズ・NO.９)" Released: September 8, 2007; 2. "China Discotica (チャイナ・ディスコティカ)" Released: March 5, 2008; 3. "Darling Wondering Staring / Star Fruits Surf Rider (limited release)" Released: May 7, 2008

COPY is the debut album by the Japanese electronic artist Mitsuki Aira. It was released on September 8, 2008 as a CD, in two editions, both containing the singles "Colorful Tokyo Sounds No. 9", "China Discotica" and "Darling Wondering Staring". "Galaxy Boy" was used as the ending theme to Aichi Television's program Bonita! Bonita!! and The Dream Car Club of Tamoei Yakushiji. The album reached a peak daily position of number 31 on the Oricon chart, and a peak weekly position of number 48 and sold 3,163 copies.

== Track listing ==
=== Regular volume package edition ===
No.	Title	Length
1.	"Galaxy Boy"	4:27
2.	"China Discotica (チャイナ・ディスコティカ)"	4:44
3.	"Colorful Tokyo Sounds No.9 (カラフル・トーキョーサウンズ・NO.９)"	5:36
4.	"Darling Wondering Staring"	5:03
5.	"Heart Line Alive"	5:34
6.	"China Discotica (Substance remix) (チャイナ・ディスコティカ (Substance remix))"	3:04
7.	"Fantasy Candy (ファンタジーキャンディ)"	4:00
8.	"High Bash (original ver.) (ハイバッシュ (Original ver.))"	4:55
9.	"Swallowtail Dance (Cherryboy function ver.)"	4:52
10.	"Beep Count Fantastic (feat. Terukado)"	4:29
11.	"Yellow Supercar (イエロースパカー)"	4:55
12.	"Happiness Land"	4:03
13.	"Star Fruits Surf Rider"	4:57
14.	"Rock'n Roll Is Dead"	4:18
15.	"Romantic Rope"	4:03

=== Limited special price edition ===
A limited release of the album was produced for a lower price, only containing tracks one through twelve. Track eight, High Bash (Original ver.) (ハイバッシュ (Original ver.)), was replaced with High Bash (Yakenohara ver.) (ハイバッシュ (YAKENOHARA ver.)) in this edition.

=== Bonus discs ===
Two external CDs were given away with purchases of either edition of the album for a limited time at certain Tower Records and HMV. Tower Records distributed a bonus disc containing a "Yakenohara Megamix" while HMV distributed a bonus disc containing "L0ne1yBoy L0ne1yGirl", which was later included as a coupling track on the HMV exclusive single, Valentine Step.
