= Brandon Patton =

American game designer and musician

- Also known as: BL4k Lotus
- Origin: United States
- Genres: Pop, Rock
- Years active: 1996 – present
- Website: brandonpatton.com

Brandon Patton is an American game designer and musician.

== Games ==
=== Game Design ===
- Caps & Stems: Mushrooms of the World (board game, in-development)
- Super PACS: The Game of Politics About the Game of Politics (2016, TableTip Games)
- Healing Blade: Defenders of Soma (2016, Nerdcore Medical)
- Occam's Razor: The Diagnostician's Dilemma (2013, Nerdcore Medical)

== Music ==
=== Awards ===
- Winner of the Vox Populi for Best Story Song of 2009 (for "Mixed-Up Modern Family") by the 9th Annual Independent Music Awards,
- 2009 Finalist in the USA Songwriting Competition in the Rock / Alternative category.
- Featured on NPR's song of the day Oct. 8, 2009.
- "Top Music Artist" at the 2005 Temecula Film and Music Festival.
- The album Should Confusion was a finalist for "Album of the Year" in the 2004 Independent Music Awards.
- Finalist in the 2004 Newport Folk Festival New Talent Showcase.

=== Solo albums ===
- How I Allegedly Bit a Man in Gloucestershire (2011)
- Underhill Downs (2009)
- Should Confusion (2004)
- Nocturnal (1997)

=== Other albums ===
- Jukebox Stories, The Official Bootleg (2008)
- three against four, Hey Sparkle Eyes (2000)
- three against four, Some of Us Are Here (1998)

=== Compilations featuring Patton ===
- Nerdcore Rising: Music From the Motion Picture (2008)
- Indie Pop Cares A lot (2005)
- Temecula Valley International Film & Music Festival 2005 Compilation (2005)
- The WSVNRadio Hall of Fame, Vol. 14 (2004)
- Oasis Acoustic Vol. 47 (2004) note: due to a printing error, he is listed only as Brandon

=== Music festival appearances ===
- SXSW Music Festival (2012)
- Truck America (2010)
- Heart of Texas Quadruple Bypass Music Festival (2008)
- Newport Folk Festival New Talent Showcase (2005)
- Temecula Film and Music Festival (2005)
- NXNE Toronto (2005)

=== Musical groups ===
- MC Frontalot (2006–2016)
- Futureboy
- Jonathan Coulton
- The Famous
- MC Lars
- Steve Songs
- Solea
- three against four (1997–2000)

== Theater and film ==
=== Theater ===
- Jukebox Stories 3: The Secrets of Forking (2013, performer)
- Jukebox Stories 2: The Case of the Creamy Foam (2008, performer)
- Love Sucks! A Punk Rock Musical (2007, composer)
- Jukebox Stories (2006, 2007, performer)
- The AtrainPlays (2005–2007, composer)
- Young Zombies in Love (2004, bassist)

=== Film ===
- Remedy (2013) background music
- The Muslims Are Coming (2012) background music
- Nerdcore Rising (2008) as himself
- Mutual Appreciation (2005) background music
