= Achewood =

Webcomic by Chris Onstad

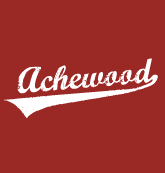
- Author: Chris Onstad
- Website: www.achewood.com
- Current status/schedule: Active
- Launch date: October 1, 2001
- Genre(s): Slice-of-life, surreal humor

Achewood is a webcomic created by Chris Onstad in 2001. It portrays the lives of a group of anthropomorphic stuffed toys, robots, and pets. Many of the characters live together in the home of their owner, Chris, at the fictional address of 62 Achewood Court. The events of the strip mostly take place in and around the house, as well as around the town of Achewood, a fictional suburb.

The comic's humor is usually absurdist, typically lacking a traditional punchline, and sometimes surreal. The strip features many characters with detailed backstories. Many Achewood strips contain some reference to food or drink because the author is a food and cooking enthusiast.

Originally published regularly, the comic began to miss release dates in late 2010. In March 2011, Onstad announced that Achewood would be going on an indefinite hiatus. In November 2011, the comic returned, followed by an announcement in December that the hiatus was over. However, Onstad stated that no regular schedule will be in effect, and new strips were released sporadically. Onstad indicated in 2013 that he had plans for pitching Achewood as an animated series. No further news came from this, and the comic itself was not updated between April 7, 2014, and December 24, 2015. When the strip returned, it was updated most subsequent Fridays. On December 25, 2016, Onstad announced that the strip would go on another hiatus. In 2023, Onstad resumed producing Achewood on a consistent weekly basis, making it available via Patreon.

== History ==
The first Achewood strip was released on October 1, 2001. The location and the comic were named after an ingredient supposedly used by slaves during the United States's antebellum era that would induce melancholia in the drinker, according to the comic's website.

Throughout Achewood, there is no distinguishable underlying storyline, only the general passing of time and development of the comic's characters and their interrelationships. The characters are mainly developed through one-off strips and short story arcs. There were 46 story arcs from 2002 to 2010. These story arcs are often interrupted with cutaways to the activity of other Achewood characters, which may or may not tie in with the main storyline of the arc. The pages often rely upon strange humor as well as stereotypes, literary and historical references, and an in-depth knowledge of the characters and their interactions.

Most strips include an alt text, a one-sentence aside written in Onstad's voice that appears when the reader hovers the cursor over the strip. The first alt-text was the word snif on Christmas, 2001. The first of the regular full-sentence alt-text appeared on January 2, 2002, apparently excusing a weak strip: "whatever. it was late and a friend was over."

In October 2002, Achewood's "Sunday Edition" became part of the online alternative comics anthology Serializer. In their review of serializer.net, The Comics Journal wrote: "It's a pleasure to see strips like Achewood's 'Sunday' strip ... use the newspaper format for far more daring, entertainingly perverse work ... would be perfectly at home at a good alternative weekly or a great college paper." Achewood is sometimes featured in the Chaparral, Stanford University's humor publication, of which Onstad is a retired editor.

On April 30, 2003, Onstad introduced an advice column written by the character Ray called Ray's Place. The column has developed characters, mainly as perceived by Ray, and allows for readers to interact with the character.

July 2004 saw the introduction of several in-character blogs hosted on Blogger. Onstad stated in an interview that he found the blogs easier to maintain than the strip, as they do not require as much refining.

In late 2004, it was announced that Checker Book Publishing Group was to release a collection of Achewood comics later that year. Checker had signed Onstad to a three-book deal that was to begin in November 2004. However, the deal was cancelled soon after due to creative differences.

On September 10, 2008, Dark Horse Comics published a 104-page extended version of "The Great Outdoor Fight" story arc, with a deleted scene, background material on the fight, and other original content.

Dark Horse subsequently published in October 2009 the first several years of Achewood comics under the title of Achewood Volume Two: Worst Song, Played On Ugliest Guitar, including notes on each strip by Onstad. A third volume, Achewood Volume Three: A Home For Scared People, was published in December 2010 and contains strips up to the end of October 2002.

The arrival of new comics slowed down in late 2010. On March 20, 2011, Onstad posted on his blog that Achewood would be on an indefinite hiatus. Between November 2011, and June 2012, Onstad posted comics on an erratic basis, with up to four comics per month, then resumed regular, weekly new comics from August 2013 to April 7, 2014.

Onstad resumed posting comics on December 24, 2015, with the first new strip in 20 months, and continued to update the site on most subsequent Fridays throughout 2016. On December 25, 2016, Onstad announced that he was "walking away" from the strip and that it would be entering another extended hiatus period.

The webcomic was resumed in 2023, being made available over Patreon.

== Major characters ==
=== Raymond Quentin Smuckles ===
Raymond Quentin "Ray" Smuckles is a somewhat overweight American Curl cat. In the comic, Ray is a financially successful musician after he sold his soul to the devil in exchange for success in pop music. The character is lucky and acquires money in various ways. He tends to throw lots of parties and is generous to his friends, but he has a weakness for gambling and is occasionally rude and insensitive. Ray made his first appearance on January 10, 2002, and has since become a major character in the comic along with Roast Beef. He can be identified by his outfit – designer glasses, a thong, the occasional fur coat, and a gold medallion.

An advice column called Ray's Place is written in character by Ray on the Achewood site.

=== "Roast Beef" Kazenzakis ===
Roast Beef Kazenzakis is an intersex cat character. His birth name was "Cassandra" and it is unknown where his nickname, "Roast Beef", came from. He serves as one of the main characters of Achewood along with Ray. Roast Beef often serves as a foil to Ray in the strips. He is interested in Unix computer programming, poetry, and he has a wife named Molly Sanders whom he met in Heaven but eventually she came down to Earth to marry him. Despite a difficult childhood marked by poverty and trauma, including his mother killing his father, Beef battles his constant depression and suicidal thoughts. His relationship with Molly has improved his mental state, aided by light therapy. He has been shot four times in the comic.

Roast Beef has written a number of poems, both in the strip and on his in-character blog. A recurrent theme in these involves weapons disguised as food.

=== Philippe ===
Philippe is an undyingly optimistic and naïve young otter who resides in the house with Cornelius Bear, Lyle and Téodor, as well as Chris and Chris's family. His housemates collectively raised him with varied success, with Téodor acting as a nurturing motherly-type; Lyle as a neglectful big brother, and Mr. Bear as a stern but gentle father. He is separated from his mother, who lives in Ohio, but they talk on the phone frequently, and have a close relationship. His mother occasionally sends him unusual presents. Other than the fact that he is deceased, nothing is known about Philippe's father. He is implied to be of French descent, and to have fought in a war as a youth.

Philippe seems to be perpetually five years old, and celebrates his fifth birthday every year. A strip which revealed the future of the Achewood characters showed that Philippe will still be the same age, even after the other characters grow old and die. He eventually ends up moving back in with this mother, further emphasizing his young age.

His character has inspired music such as a song by the synth-pop band Freezepop titled "Here Comes a Special Boy" and the Song Fight! Entries for "What We Need More Of Is Science" by Brody and Octothorpe are two different versions of the same song about Philippe.

=== Cornelius Bear ===
Often referred to in the comic as Mr. Bear (and "Connie" by Ray), he is a bear that is a scholarly and fatherly figure to much of the cast, being much older than most of them — he was married to his first (now deceased) wife, Iris Gambol, sometime before 1967. He is characterizied by his love of alcohol, literature, his British mannerisms, and his fine taste. It has also been implied that he has been imprisoned in the past. He is well regarded for having written many different children's books. He wears pince-nez glasses and is usually seen in a dressing gown. The other members of the cast hold him in high regard except for a character named Lyle. He owns a pub named "The Dude and Catastrophe" and briefly dated a woman half his age.

=== Lyle Roscoe Gabriel ===
Lyle is a belligerent stuffed tiger who enjoys playing pranks on his friends and drinking. He is a talented calligrapher, cosmetician, and is knowledgeable about cars. Lyle has a mysterious past which caused him to move from Gainesville, Florida, to Achewood. Lyle is often seen drunk due to being more comfortable that way, but is intelligent when sober. He is often seen wearing a T-shirt for the band Misfits in the comic strips. He was previously employed in every position in a kitchen at one point, and as a barber, but is typically unemployed. Lyle is close friends with the character Todd T. Squirrel, who shares his love of alcohol.

=== Téodor Orezscu ===
Téodor is a teddy bear. He originates from Minsk, Belarus, and is of Jewish descent. He is a skilled cook, musician, and graphic designer, and is portrayed as being an all around friendly guy. His personality was originally quite crazy, exhibiting nudist tendencies in early Achewood strips, though he seems to have dropped those in later strips. He is also depicted using marijuana and mushrooms. While talented and intelligent, he is often portrayed as lacking motivation and direction except when exercising or cooking. He had an online relationship with a girl named Penny, and eventually it is shown how the relationship ended up. Penny made Téodor the T-emblazoned sweater he wears in the comic, leaving it as a gift for him. While the other stuffed animals of the house treat Philippe as a roommate, Téodor instead fills the role of Philippe's guardian while the otter is separated from his mother. Téodor died in the April 28, 2005, comic strip due to choking on a bottle cap but was revived when Lyle kicked him in the gut. Onstad has said Téodor is similar to him in real life.

=== Patrick Reynolds ===
Pat is one of the three original cat characters, along with Roast Beef and Ray. His role has receded into the background over the webcomic's runtime, but his is still a notable presence. He is a generally an unpleasant character with a negative attitude and is often the antagonist in many strips. He has high standards for other characters and gets angry when they do not meet them. Pat also seems to look down on various occupations such as barbers and disabled people. He seems to suffer from OCD and anger issues, for which he attends a support group. He is into Zen Buddhism and veganism to look superior to his friends, but he secretly prefers to eat meat. He was put in jail for shooting the character Roast Beef, but escaped and got off the hook due to Ray's connections. He lives with a serial killer he met in jail named Peter "Nice Pete" Cropes. Pat disowned his father, Simon Reynolds, due to Simon coming out as gay. However, Pat later came out as gay as well due to a family curse and has been dating a gay porn star named Rod Huggins.

=== Molly Sanders ===
Molly, a cat character, was born in 17th-century Wales. She died in a shipwreck in 1676 and went to Heaven, where she was able to keep up on developments in the living world and became interested in modern technology. Roast Beef first met her in Heaven after Pat shot him. Molly now resides on Earth, living in Ray's pool shed with Roast Beef after she and Roast Beef got married. Roast Beef's lack of social skills means their relationship is often strained, but Molly's patience and tolerance often win out. Molly picked up programming in Heaven, but since she died long before computers and coding were invented she has no official qualifications and was forced to get a job in the service industry. She has held different jobs over the course of the comic, but now works at a Starbucks. She runs an in-universe show named the "Achewood A-List".

== Early development of the series ==
In the early months of Achewood, the strip takes place entirely at Chris Onstad's house, and the four original characters, Philippe, Téodor, Lyle, and Cornelius Bear, are implied to be essentially trapped there. They are forced to hide from normal people due to being alive stuffed animals, and there is no mention of having jobs, money, or any real responsibilities. After Ray, Roast Beef and Pat are introduced, however, the characters begin to assume more complex personalities and exercise greater independence. The transition from a gag-a-day webcomic to a more involved one happened abruptly during an extended story arc called "The Party," the first of the long-form storylines which would become a staple of Achewood. Subsequent chapters establish more clearly defined relationships between the characters, add additional depth to their personalities, and follow the main cast through other major story arcs.

At the beginning of Achewood, the two main characters, Ray and Roast Beef were background characters. They were a part of a trio of cats, along with Pat, who always appeared together and were known for their vulgar insults. Only Ray and Pat were given names originally. As time passed, Ray and Beef were given more and more panel time, eventually becoming the central characters of the strip, with the original four main characters taking on supporting roles.

== Other features ==
Chris Onstad has also produced other material within the Achewood 'universe', including:

- Various blogs written by some of the comic's characters.
- A zine, Man Why You Even Got to Do a Thing, purportedly written by Roast Beef (publication halted since Issue 7).
- Two novellas by the character Nice Pete.
- The Achewood Cookbook, aimed mainly at beginners, in which the characters provide recipes and cooking advice. Onstad was frustrated by The French Laundry Cookbook, finding it "essentially useless to any home cook", and wrote his own cookbook aimed at "guys who are just out of college and have one pan and one electric burner". Onstad believed that doing such a task would be entertaining and challenging. Onstad visited a supermarket chain store and bought eggs, ground beef, and mustard, and created around 50 recipes based around them. The book includes recipes for cocktails, Scotch eggs, hot dogs, chicken, orzo, and other foods and drinks. Ray Smuckles presents all of the cocktails. Danielle Maestretti of Utne Reader said that the recipes range in appeal and complexity.
- A former feature called "Current Kid Status", in which Onstad documented the joys, travails and current events of raising his son. It ran from his son's birth in March 2005, until 27 November 2007. A compendium of these bits has been packaged into a book and is available for purchase at The Achewood Store.
- The Achewood Store, which includes such items as clothing, cookbooks, aprons, glasses and other assorted goods.
- A Twitter page, once featuring tweets about the daily activities of the Achewood characters, but now focusing on the life of Onstad himself.

== Reception ==
As of April 10, 2007, Achewood received about ten million page views monthly. James Norton of Salon.com said that the "well-developed cast of characters, many of whom just happen to be seriously into good food" get the attention of the audience.

=== Awards ===
On September 12, 2007, Achewood was named "Funniest Webcomic" by humour website Cracked.com.

Achewood received the Ignatz Award in 2007 and 2008 for Outstanding Online Comic.

Time magazine's Lev Grossman named it number one on its list of the top 10 graphic novels of 2007.

In November 2009, Achewood was named one of the best comics of the '00s by The A.V. Club.

In November 2019, Achewood ranked #14 on Rolling Stone's list of "The 50 Best Non-Superhero Graphic Novels".

Achewood has been nominated for multiple Web Cartoonists' Choice Awards:

- 2004: Outstanding Writing
- 2005: Outstanding Writer
- 2006: Outstanding Comic, Outstanding Writer, Outstanding Character Writing & Outstanding Comedic Comic
- 2008: Outstanding Comic, Outstanding Writer & Outstanding Character Writing

== Author ==
Chris Onstad was born June 14, 1975, in California and grew up in a small town near Sonora, in the Sierra foothills. Onstad attended Stanford University, where he edited the Stanford Chaparral humor magazine. Onstad has published several books: nine anthologies of Achewood comics; a humorous cookbook featuring recipes purportedly invented by the strip's characters; A Wonderful Tale, a book written from the perspective of a character from the strip; and that same character's second novel A Hilarious Comedy. He has also published six editions of Man Why You Even Got to Do a Thing, an Achewood-centric zine.

Onstad reveals little of his private life online, but it is known that he currently lives in Portland, Oregon. Chris and his first wife have a son, born in 2005. Onstad formerly had a section on his website about his son, titled "current kid status," which he updated regularly with stories and happenings. These are collected in the self-published book Current Baby Status – The Collected Archive. In a February 23, 2012, interview with The Believer Onstad revealed that he had divorced from his wife.

Chris Onstad has self-published sixteen books: seven collections of Achewood comics, two books by character Nice Pete (A Wonderful Tale and A Hilarious Comedy), six 'zines by another named Roast Beef, and Recipes for a Lady or a Man: The Achewood Cookbook with recipes from several of the main characters. A second cookbook, titled You Can't Put Cream Sauce on the Truth, The Achewood Cookbook Vol 2 was published in 2022.

In September 2013, Onstad launched a new business, Portland Soda Works.

In September 2024, Onstad remarried.

=== Influences ===
Onstad remarked in an interview that "You can't help but be affected by Mark Twain books, Lay's Potato Chip ads, a fat lady who is yelling outside, David Letterman, etc." And elsewhere, to Brian M. Palmer, "The reader would likely be a better judge." He has expressed admiration for Chris Ware and Tony Millionaire. He has also claimed to be influenced by "Bryson, Barry, Twain, Elton, Wodehouse, Adams, Vonnegut, John Irving, Arthur Conan Doyle, Jack Handey, Al Franken, that sort of thing. Those sorts of guys. Tina Fey. Aaron Sorkin."

In another interview with Brian Palmer, he professed his admiration for the British comedy show Look Around You and also stated, "I haven't seen anything that tops Mr. Show."

In regards to the influence of the culinary culture, Onstad said that he always enjoyed eating food. Onstad said that when he met his first wife, she was "a bit more of a cook" than he was; she had traveled to Italy to study abroad. Since he was, in his words, "mostly omnivorous" and she is a vegetarian, the two have to find food that can appeal to both of them. Onstad added that he is "competitive" and aims to "do a good job with these things and impress people." In addition, since Onstad's wife was an employee of Williams Sonoma, the two received discounted high end cookware that they normally would not have bought. On January 27, 2012, it was announced that Onstad would be the new food critic for the Portland Mercury.

== Bibliography ==
=== Self-published ===
- Volume I – A Momentary Diversion on the Road to the Grave
- Volume II – Worst Song, Played on Ugliest Guitar
- Volume III – The Devil's Dictionary
- Volume IV – Ten A.M. and Drunk as a Lord
- Volume V – An Empty Cup of Rum
- Volume VI – The Dude Is from Circumstances
- Volume VII – Kiss My Ass, Bitch. I'll Be at Duane's
- Volume VIII – Emergency Party At My Place
- Volume IX – Soured on Beer and Given to Claims
- The Achewood Cookbook
- Nice Pete's A Wonderful Tale
- Nice Pete's A Hilarious Comedy
- Roast Beef's Man Why You Even Got to Do a Thing, Nos. 1, 2, 3, 4, 5 and 6
- Current Baby Status
- The Collected Achewood Blogs, Vol I, 1–31 July 2004

=== Published by Dark Horse Comics ===
- Achewood: The Great Outdoor Fight (September 2008)
  - Collects strips from January 11, 2006, to March 30, 2006, plus bonus material
- Achewood Volume 2: Worst Song, Played on Ugliest Guitar (October 2009)
  - Collects strips from January 10, 2002, to May 7, 2002, plus "Before We Were Achewood: The Early Experiments" (December 10, 2001 to December 17, 2001) and bonus material
- Achewood Volume 3: A Home For Scared People (April 2010)
  - Collects strips from May 8, 2002, to October 29, 2002, plus "Before We Were Achewood, Concluded" (December 18, 2001 to January 9, 2002) and bonus material
