= Plastic (Mitsuki Aira album) =

Studio album by Aira Mitsuki
- Released: July 22, 2009
- Recorded: 2008–2009
- Genre: J-pop; EDM; electropop
- Length: 66:27
- Label: D-topia; Victor
- Producer: Ōnishi Terukado

Aira Mitsuki chronology
Copy (2008)	Plastic (2009)	6 Force (2009)

Singles from Plastic
- 1. "Robot Honey" Released: October 29, 2008; 2. "Sayonara Technopolis" Released: January 21, 2009; 3. "Barbie Barbie" Released: May 20, 2009

Plastic, stylized all caps, is the second studio album by Japanese singer Aira Mitsuki, released on July 22, 2009 by D-topia Entertainment and Victor Entertainment. The album contains features from artists Ayuse Kozue, Kuchiroro, Shigeo from Japanese bands SBK and The Samos, and the album producer Ōnishi Terukado.

Plastic was preceded by three singles: "Robot Honey", "Sayonara Technopolis", and "Barbie Barbie". "Robot Honey" was released on October 26, 2008, followed by "Sayonara Technopolis" on January 21, 2009 and "Barbie Barbie" on May 20, 2009. "Plastic Doll" became the album's title track and was given a music video. The concert "Aira Mitsuki Special Live '090319' in Liquidroom" supported the singles.

Upon its release, Plastic debuted at the thirty-third spot of the Oricon Weekly Albums Chart and later selling 4,195 copies, becoming her current best-selling album according to Oricon.

== Editions ==
The album was released as a regular album and two special editions, one of which contains a live DVD and the other a remix CD.

== Track listing ==
Adapted from the album's Oricon page and Apple Music credits.

CD/digital download version

No.	Title	Lyrics	Music	Length
1.	"Robot Honey" (ロボットハニー)	TO-WEST	Alex Funk it	4:39
2.	"Summeeeeeeeer Set" (featuring Ayuse Kozue)	TO-WEST, Aira Mitsuki	TO-WEST	5:09
3.	"Knee-high Girl" (ニーハイガール)	TO-WEST	TO-WEST	3:55
4.	"Bad Trip" (featuring Terukado)	TO-WEST	TO-WEST	4:55
5.	"Change My Will"	TO-WEST	TO-WEST, NExx WORKS	4:09
6.	"High Speed Dance Sneaker" (HiGH SD スニーカー)	TO-WEST	Alex Funk It, TO-WEST	4:25
7.	"Distant Stars"	TO-WEST	TO-WEST	3:39
8.	"Plastic Doll" (プラスティックドール)	Aira Mitsuki	NExx WORKS	3:58
9.	"Sapuri" (サプリ)	Aira Mitsuki	Kampkin Malkee	4:20
10.	"Natsu Ame" (夏飴; featuring Kuchiroro)	TO-WEST, Kuchiroro	TO-WEST, Kuchiroro	4:31
11.	"Time Is" (featuring Shigeo of SBK and The Samos)	TO-WEST	TO-WEST	5:15
12.	"Sayonara Technopolis" (サヨナラ TECHNOPOLiS)	TO-WEST	TO-WEST	4:09
13.	"Barbie Barbie"	TO-WEST	Alex Funk It	4:33
14.	"Re" (Re: †)	TO-WEST	TO-WEST	8:25
Total length:				66:27

Notes

- "Natsu Ame" contains the chorus taken from the song "Fantasy Candy" from her debut album Copy (2008).
- "Knee-high Girl" is a B-side track from the "Robot Honey" single.
- "Change My Will" is a B-side track from the "Barbie Barbie" single.
- "High Speed Dance Sneaker" and "Distant Stars" are B-side tracks from the "Sayonara Technopolis" single.

== Charts ==
Chart (2009)	Peak position
Japanese Weekly Albums (Oricon)	33

== Credits ==
Credits adapted from RateYourMusic.

- Aira Mitsuki - vocals, lyrics
- Terukado Ōnishi - executive producer, featured vocals, producer
- Takafumi Nagaiwa - recording engineer, mastering engineer
- Maki Saito - art direction, graphic design
- Kazunori Wataya - photography
- Ayuse Kozue - featured vocals
- Kuchiroro - featured vocals, lyrics, music, producer
- Shigeo (SBK/The Samos) - featured vocals, producer, lyrics, music
- Alex Funk It - music
- NExx WORKS - music
- Kampkin Malkee - music
- TO-WEST - arrangements, mixing, lyrics
- Electric Invaders - arrangements, mixing
- Discotica2oooo6969 - arrangements, mixing
- Tokyo Ikejiri Plastic Babe - arrangements, mixing
- Hitoshi Ohishi - mixing
