= Saori@destiny =

Japanese electronica artist

- Also known as: Saoriiiii (2014-2022); Saori Rinne (さおり凛ね) (2023-present)
- Born: June 10, 1986 (age 40); Japan
- Genres: J-pop; synthpop; electronica; electro; R&B; house; vocal trance; experimental
- Occupation: Singer-songwriter
- Instruments: Vocals; keyboards
- Years active: 2007–2012; 2014–present
- Label: D-topia (2008–2012)
- Website: www.saori-destiny.com

Saori@destiny (pronounced "Saori at Destiny"; born June 10, 1986) is a Japanese singer-songwriter. She made her independent debut on December 5, 2007, with the single "My Boy", followed by her major-label debut single "Sakura" on March 26, 2008 under D-topia Entertainment. During her time as a major-label artist, Saori was produced by former artist Terukado Ōnishi, and she released two studio albums and two EPs that time: Japanese Chaos (2008), Wow War Techno (2009), World Wild 2010 (2010) and Domestic Domain (2011). After leaving D-topia in April 2012, Saori went on a two-year hiatus and returned in 2014 as Saoriiiii. On January 1, 2023, Saori announced that she has changed her stage name again to Saori Rinne (Japanese: さおり凛ね).

== Background ==
Saori began her musical career by performing street lives in Akihabara. She signed to D-topia Entertainment after being accepted in an audition and meeting producer Terukado in Kyoto. She released two limited edition CDs, one containing the song My Boy which was the opening song for the MMORPG Secret Online in December 2007. Soon after, she then released her debut single "My Boy" which reached number 7 on the Oricon indies chart. She then released a second single entitled "Sakura" (a Kyogo Kawaguchi cover) which was released on March 26, 2008, and officially her major debut. Her first album, Japanese Chaos, was released on November 19, 2008. The album contains "Sakura", a new vocal mix of "My Boy" and a denpa remix of "Sayonara Revival" among other new songs.

Saori's third single, "Wow War Techno," was released on February 11, 2009, as a limited-edition CD and digital download. A music video was produced for it in the style of a MAD Movie from Nico Nico Douga. An eight-track mini album, also named Wow War Techno, was released on March 18.

In 2009, anxious to disassociate Saori from the idol scene and thus give her more authenticity as a musician, her staff forbade the use of wotagei, lightsticks, and the MIX (a chant called by the audience during idol concerts) at her shows. This period marked her transition from being an idol to more of an underground artist.

She released the limited-edition single Ethnic Planet Survival (エスニック・プラネット・サバイバル, Esunikku Puranetto Sabaibaru) through Tower Records in January 2010 and another limited-edition single entitled "Lonely Lonely Lonely" through HMV in February. She has participated in UNICEF's Happy Birthday For Children project with hip-hop group Riemann.Mic, recording a song entitled "Birthday Everyday" and releasing an accompanying promotional video.

Leading to the release of her second full-length album, "World Wild 2010", which went on to become Saori's current highest-selling album in her career, selling almost 1,000 copies, and reached the number 35 and 129 spots in the Oricon daily and weekly charts respectively. It also became available worldwide through iTunes, making it Saori@destiny's, as well as D-topia's first ever album to be released worldwide through digital distribution.

Saori's last concert was held at Shibuya Glad on April 1, 2012. Since then, she was not involved with music, though she made a public appearance at the street live of Curumi Chronicle, an Osaka-based local idol who performs technopop songs much in the same style as Saori's early work.

On July 9, it was confirmed Saori would be returning to music as Saoriiiii, with her first performance confirmed for September 15, 2014. She is now independent of a label.

On January 1, 2023, Saori announced that she has changed her stage name again to Saori Rinne. On June 13, 2023, Saori released her overall third studio album Rinne (輪廻) which is her first album under her new stage name.

== Musical style and influences ==
She writes her own lyrics, which often explore heartbreak and depression, and stated in an interview that she listens to melodies and then writes songs based on her own feelings. Like labelmate Aira Mitsuki, she is also involved in the heavy use of Auto-Tune and vocoders and her songs are sometimes compared also to some of Yasutaka Nakata's works and produced acts. From 2010 onwards, Saori@destiny was accompanied by two backing keyboardists during her live performances, and Saori began occasionally playing live instruments such as samplers and synthesizers.

During her time in Akihabara, she performed songs by AKB48, Hello!Project, and labelmates 80 Pan.

She has covered "Shangri-La" by Denki Groove, "Sakura" by Kyogo Kawaguchi, and "Ez Do Dance" by TRF amongst others.

Saori has worked with the "anime, electro, fashion" party brand Denpa!!! and, after her first album, the Japanese fashion label Galaxxxy. Her debut album, Japanese Chaos featured a Denpa remix by noted gabber and nerdcore producer DJ Sharpnel and she has performed live at Denpa!!! parties. The promotional photos and covers for "Ethnic Planet Survival" and "Lonely Lonely Lonely" were styled by Galaxxxy.

Her album "WORLD WILD 2010" is notable for its wide range of international musical styles, incorporating such genres as Brazilian funk carioca and Indonesian funky kota or funkot. The album is widely recognised among Japanese funkot fans as the first major-label album released in the country to include a funkot track. For the mini-album "Domestic domain," which was lyrically inspired by the 2011 Tōhoku earthquake, she incorporated styles such as soul, R&B, hip-hop, tribal dance (promotion for the release dubbed her the "TRIBAL DANCE QUEEN"), and turntablism.

== Discography ==
=== Studio albums ===
List of studio albums, with selected details, chart positions, and sales
Title	Details	Peak chart position (Oricon)	Sales
Title	Details	JPN	Sales
Japanese Chaos (released as Saori@destiny)	Released: November 19, 2008; Label: D-topia Entertainment; Formats: CD, digital download; Track listing: 1. "Shangri-la"; 2. "Sayonara Revival"; 3. "My Boy" (new vocal styling mix); 4. "Chemical Soda"; 5. "My Way"; 6. "Perfect Lonely Boy"; 7. "Sakura"; 8. "0 no Mahou to Hysteric Sniper"; 9. "Hikari Syndrome"	225	JPN: 500+
World Wild 2010 (released as Saori@destiny)	Released: April 20, 2010; Label: D-topia Entertainment; Formats: CD, digital download, streaming	129	JPN: 812
Rinne (輪廻) (released as Saori Rinne)	Released: June 13, 2023; Label: Self-released; Formats: Digital download, streaming; Track listing: 1. "Overture"; 2. "Kibou" (Album Mix); 3. "Rinne"; 4. "Can't Stop"; 5. "What the hell !?"; 6. "Zetsumetsu"; 7. "Bad End"; 8. "Detarame"; 9. "Coda"; 10. "Handler"	-	
"—" denotes items that did not chart or were not released in that area.

=== Collaboration albums ===
List of collaboration studio albums, with selected details, and chart positions
Title	Details	Peak chart positions
Title	Details	JPN
X: Park of the Safari (×～PARK OF THE SAFARI) (Aira Mitsuki × Saori@destiny)	Released: December 7, 2011; Label: D-topia Universe; Formats: CD, digital download; Track listing: 1. "Gate or Exit"; 2. "Discovery"; 3. "Wowtown"; 4. "Panama"; 5. "Damage"; 6. "Umbrella" (Aira Mitsuki); 7. "Theme of Safari"; 8. "Last Song" (Saori@destiny); 9. "Animal Daydream"; 10. "Special Link"	210

=== EPs ===
List of extended plays, with selected details, and chart positions
Title	Details	Peak chart positions
Title	Details	JPN
Wow War Techno (released as Saori@destiny)	Released: March 18, 2009; Label: D-topia Entertainment; Formats: CD, digital download, streaming; Track listing: 1. "Wow War Techno"; 2. "Breathe Breathe Breathing"; 3. "EZ Do Dance"; 4. "Lost"; 5. "Spiral"; 6. "Yowamushi Heart"; 7. "Stainless Starlight"	230
Domestic Domain (released as Saori@destiny)	Released: June 15, 2011; Label: D-topia Universe; Formats: CD, digital download	176
Thanks (released as Saoriiiii)	Released: December 20, 2015; Label: Self-released; Formats: CD, digital download, streaming	-
Nostalgy (released as Saoriiiii)	Released: March 23, 2016; Label: Self-released; Formats: CD, digital download, streaming	-
Tokyo Kunyan (released as Saoriiiii)	Released: September 19, 2018; Label: Self-released; Formats: Digital download, streaming	-
"—" denotes items that did not chart or were not released in that area.

=== Singles ===
- 2007: "My Boy" (December 2007, independent debut single with DTJ)
- 2008: "Sakura" (major debut single)
- 2009: "Wow War Techno" (digital single)
- 2010: "Ethnic Planet Survival" (limited-edition single)
- 2010: "Lonely Lonely Lonely" (limited-edition single)
- 2010: "Sympa / EZ Do Dance" (free rental single distributed at chain store Tsutaya Records)
- 2014: "runaway?" (as Saoriiiii)
- 2014: "3cm Distance" (as Saoriiiii)
- 2017: "freepass license" (as Saoriiiii)
