= Aira Mitsuki =

Japanese singer (born 1988)

- Born: September 21, 1988 (age 37)
- Origin: Saitama Prefecture, Japan
- Genres: Pop; synthpop; electronica; vocal trance; dance
- Occupations: Singer; songwriter
- Instruments: Vocals; keyboards; drums
- Years active: 2007–2013; 2015–2018
- Label: D-topia (2007–2013)
- Website: Official Website; Official Twitter

Aira Mitsuki (アイラミツキ) is a Japanese singer. She debuted on August 8, 2007, with "Colorful Tokyo Sounds No. 9" and released her debut album, Copy on September 3, 2008.

== Musical background and releases ==
Aira was chosen as the winner of Mega Trance 2007 from 6,325 applicants. She released her debut single, "Colorful Tokyo Sounds No. 9", on August 8 of the same year. A song from the single was selected as the official theme for the Transformers Café, based on the Transformers film, in Roppongi. Aira performed at an MTV-sponsored event for the film on July 25.

Her first album, Copy, was released on September 3, 2008. It was released in two different versions: a 12-track album and a 16-track album. The albums differ in that track 8 on the 12 regular edition album is the original version of "High Bash", while the Yakenohara version appears on the extended edition, and the songs "Star Fruits Surf Rider", "Rock'n Roll Is Dead", and "Romantic Rope" are included in the extended version. Additionally, those who purchased the album through Tower Records also received an exclusive track, "Yakenohara Megamix", while those who bought the album through HMV received the track "L0ne1yBoy L0ne1yGirl" as a bonus track.

Track 1 of the album, titled "Galaxy Boy", was used as the ending song to Aichi Television's programme Bonita!Bonita!! It was also used to promote the Dream car club of Tamoei Yakushiji. The album reached a peak daily position of number 31 on the Oricon chart, and a peak weekly position of number 48 and sold 3,163 copies. Mitsuki's first major single was written as a tribute to China for the 2008 Olympics and released on March 5, 2008. She promoted it with a live performance in a Chinese nightclub, her first and to date only overseas show. Her second major (and fourth overall) single, "Robot Honey", was released on October 29, 2008, and followed by "Valentine Step" and "Sayonara Technopolis" in February 2009. She released her seventh single, "Barbie Barbie" on May 20, and an EP exclusive to the Village Vanguard chain of stores, "Aira's Science CD", on June 17, 2009.

Aira released her second studio album, titled Plastic, on July 22, 2009 and her third album, ??? on November 17, 2010.

She released her final album with D-topia, I'll Be Back on August 21, 2013, and went on a hiatus.

In 2015, Aira returned to music independent of a label, initially using the name "AIRA" and then settling on "アイラミツキ" in time for the release of her new song "LIGHTSAVER".

== Musical style and influences ==
Aira's musical style has been compared to the popular Yasutaka Nakata-produced acts Capsule and Perfume. Aira has stated that she is a fan of Nakata's work and cites the Pizzicato Five, Kahimi Karie, Yuki, Justice, Cornelius, and Daft Punk as influences on her MySpace page, while she has covered songs by Cornelius, Kenji Ozawa, Kahimi Karie, Genki Rockets, Cascada, Lenny Kravitz, and her labelmate Saori@destiny.

Aira's music usually carries themes of science fiction or pop culture with ambient sound effects, heavy use of vocoder and lyrics exploring concepts such as space, robots and technology. "Galaxy Boy", for example, is space-themed and written about a "prototypical galaxy boy" while "Sayonara Technopolis" and its B-sides are written about issues such as human apathy, global warming, and propose moving to the Moon.

Aira has experimented with different genres of music; much of Copy had a dance sound while "Valentine Step" has strong Latin influences and "Sayonara Technopolis" was marketed as "electro meets big beat". She has also recorded several ballads and a heavy techno cover of Lenny Kravitz's "Rock and Roll Is Dead". She has, however, remained consistent in that she uses voice filters and synthesisers.

Aira's videos make use of animation and CGI, with typically fashion-forward costumes. She has professed to being a fan of video games such as Pokémon and has stated in interviews that she is inspired by science fiction and technology. She also bought a plot of land on the Moon for the release of "Sayonara Technopolis".

Aira's EP Aira's Science CD contains two tracks, "Science Music" and "Senjō no Merry Christmas" which feature the thereminvox, played by Masami Takeuchi. The CD also contains a cover of Kahimi Karie's "Mike Alway's Diary" and a remix by I Am Robot and Proud, as well as versions of "Science Music" and "Senjō no Merry Christmas" sans theremin.

While Aira is mostly a vocalist, she has incorporated instruments into many of her live performances, playing drums, various synthesizers, drum machines and samplers across her career.

== Discography ==
=== Studio albums ===
- [2008.09.08] Copy (5,010 copies sold, peak No. 48 in Oricon Weekly charts)
- [2009.07.22] Plastic (4,195 copies sold, peak No. 33 in Oricon Weekly charts)
- [2010.11.17] ??? (Three Questions) (2,758 copies sold, peak No. 45 in Oricon Weekly charts)
- [2011.12.07] ×～PARK OF THE SAFARI (Aira Mitsuki×Saori@destiny) (Collaboration album) (#210 in Oricon weekly Charts)
- [2013.08.21] I'll Be Back
- [2017.11.12] Pyramidal

=== Mini-albums ===
- [2010.06.02] 6 Force (3,391 copies sold, peak No. 34 on Oricon Weekly charts)

=== Indie singles ===
- [2007.08.08] Colorful Tokyo Sounds No.9 (カラフル・トーキョーサウンズ・NO.9)

=== Major singles ===
- [2008.03.05] China Discotica (チャイナ・ディスコティカ)
- [2008.10.29] Robot Honey (ロボットハニー)
- [2009.01.21] Sayonara Technopolis (サヨナラ TECHNOPOLiS)
- [2009.05.20] Barbie Barbie

=== Other singles ===
- [2007.xx.xx] Everytime We Touch
- [2007.xx.xx] Heavenly Star
- [2008.05.07] Darling Wondering Staring / Star Fruits Surf Rider
- [2009.01.21] Valentine Step
- [2009.06.17] Aira no Kagaku CD (Airaの科学CD; Aira's Science CD)
- [2010.01.31] Out edit. vol.1
- [2011.04.20] Hound Dog (featuring Terukado)

=== Digital downloads ===
- [2008.10.29] Knee-high Girl (ニーハイガール)
- [2009.07.01] Bad Trip (feat. Terukado)
- [2009.11.04] Plastic Live From Tokyo
- [2010.04.21] Heat My Love
- [2010.05.05] Level 5
- [2010.10.13] Aishi Aisarete Ikiru no Sa
- [2010.10.20] Why Two?
- [2015.09.21] LIGHTSAVER (c/w I'LL AGAIN..)
- [2016.03.23] Days
- [2016.04.13] Detective A

=== Vinyl ===
- [2009.10.19] Aira Mitsuki "5" mix

=== DVDs ===
- [2009.05.20] Aira Mitsuki Special Live "090319" in LiquidRoom
- [2011.04.20] ??? LiVE IN LIQUIDROOM (DVD+CD)

=== Compilations ===
- [2007.08.08] Mega Trance 08 (#2 Colorful Tokyo Sounds NO.9 [DJ U☆Hey? & Red Clavia Remix])
- [2008.07.16] Beautiful Techno (#2 China Discotica (Substance Remix))
- [2008.12.17] Teardrop (#5 Senjou no Merry Christmas, No. 8 Mike Alway's Diary)
- [2009.11.11] for Winter Music Lovers Techno Pop Xmas (#2 Senjou no Merry Christmas)
