= Nerdapalooza =

Music festival

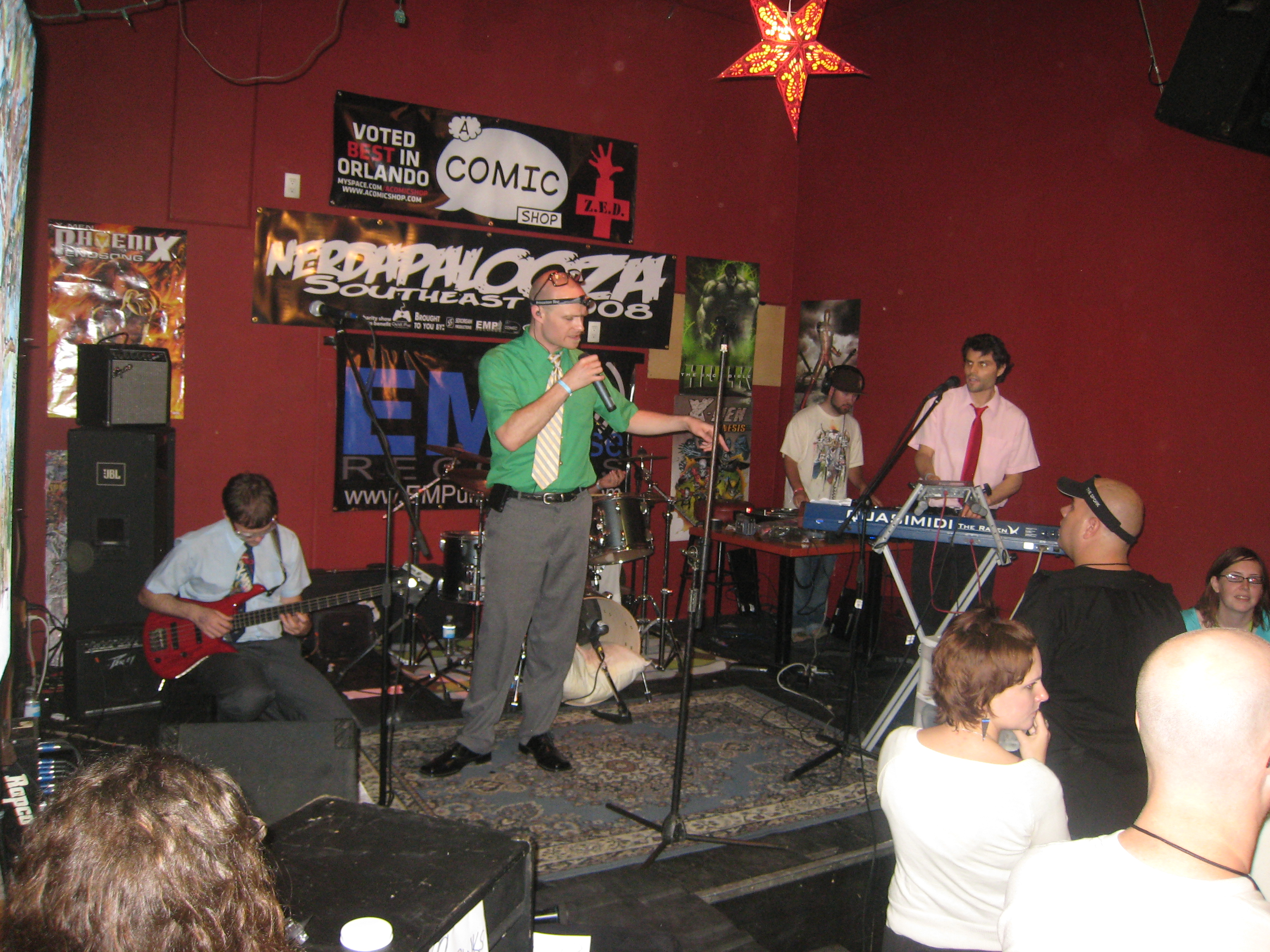
- MC Frontalot on stage at Nerdapalooza Southeast 2008
- Genre: Nerd music; geek rock; nerdcore; chiptune; video game music
- Years active: 2007–2013
- Founders: John "Hex" Carter
- Website: http://www.nerdapalooza.org/

Nerdapalooza was an annual nerd music and arts festival in Orlando, Florida, United States, the first of its kind to invite all genres of the nerd music movement under one roof, including geek rock, nerdcore, chiptune, and video game music. The festival was conceived by John "hex" Carter, who hosted a nerdy music themed radio show through KRFH, the student-run radio station at Humboldt State University. The word is derived from nerd and palooza, a reference to Lollapalooza. Nerdapalooza, LLC was dissolved on October 29, 2013.

== Nerdapalooza Southeast 2007 ==
Nerdapalooza Southeast, the first Nerdapalooza event, was a nerd music festival centered in North Central Florida. The show showcased nerdcore. It was organized by Rob Tobias. Proceeds all went to benefit "The Purple House", a charity dedicated to helping the homeless.

== Nerdapalooza Beta ==
Designed as a small show, it was sponsored by KRFH and was held in Arcata, California at the Kate Buchanan Room at Humboldt State University on September 22, 2007. Organized by John "hex" Carter.

== Nerdapalooza UK ==
Nerdapalooza UK was the United Kingdom equivalent of the American nerd music festival. Unlike its United States counterpart, it consisted of fewer artists and was a free event. Although supported by Nerdapalooza US's creator, the creator and organizer of Nerdapalooza UK was Stephen "MisterB" Brunton.

== Nerdapalooza Southeast 2008 ==
A continuation of the previous years show, Nerdapalooza Southeast was again organized by Rob Tobias. However, Carter moved to Orlando, Florida in late 2007 to act as co-organizer. Michael "The Spork" Evans and Nicholas "Sir-Up" Carman were also key coordinators for the success of this event. The show was also hosted by 3 local radio DJ's from 91.5 WPRK. Josh Thew and Logan Donahoo of "Serious Business" along with Andrew Grey of "Talk Nerdy To Me". The event was to benefit Child's Play charity and had been the most successful of all of the Nerdapaloozas thus far, receiving press coverage from both bloggers and print media, including an article released in Blender Magazine.

== Nerdapalooza 2009 ==
Held July 11 and 12, 2009, the first full Nerdapalooza showcasing all nerd music, it was again a charity show with proceeds going to Penny Arcade's "Child's Play" charity. Carter became executive director, along with other key directors Michael "The Spork" Evans, Joshua Thew, and Aaron "Masurao" Yarhouse. Official presenters were the members of the Letters Versus Numbers podcast among them Nerdapalooza UK organizer Stephen "MisterB" Brunton.

This show was the first time that the four major players in the nerdcore music scene (MC Frontalot, MC Lars, MC Chris, YTCracker ) all performed at the same event.

== Nerdapalooza 2010 ==
Held July 17 and 18, 2010 at the Orlando Airport Marriott, this Nerdapalooza marked the first year that the festival operated as its own company managed by John Carter and Aaron Yarhouse, along with press and talent directors Nina Talley and Josh Thew, respectively. The events fund raising will once again support the Child's Play charity.

In 2010 the show was presented by Nerdy Show, the official podcast of Nerdapalooza that executive director, John Carter is a co-host of along with Brian Clevinger, "Triforce" Mike Pandel, and Cap Blackard.

== Nerdapalooza 2011 ==
Nerdapalooza 2011 was held on July 16 and 17, 2011, again at the Orlando Airport Marriott. Headlined by The Protomen and I Fight Dragons, Nerdapalooza 2011 also featured The Bossfights, Sci-Fried, Marc With a C, and Captain Dan and the Scurvy Crew, amongst many others. In addition to the concerts, visual artists such as Dan Hay and Tony Baldini were featured in the art gallery.

The official presenters of Nerdapalooza 2011 were Schaffer The Darklord and Nelson Lugo.

Shinobi Ninja was named best new band.

== Nerdapalooza 2012 ==
Nerdapalooza 2012 took place August 3–5, 2012 at The Social and The Beacham in downtown Orlando, FL. Top billings were Koo Koo Kanga Roo, Metroid Metal, Math the Band, and others. The Protomen headlined both August 4 and 5, the latter with a full Queen cover set. Over 800 people were in attendance. The event was dedicated to the memories of Michael "Triforce Mike" Pandel and Joshua "MC Gigahertz" Montgomery.

== Nerdapalooza 2013 ==
Nerdapalooza 2013 took place October 18–20, 2013 in the West Concourse or the Orange County Convention Center in Orlando, FL. The headlining acts on Saturday and Sunday were Nerf Herder and They Might Be Giants, respectively. Disagreements within the company saw two members resign before the remaining members dissolved the company a week after the close of the event. They Might Be Giants management sued John Carter, Josh Thew, and Bryan Kissel over breach of contract for failure to pay, with their case against Kissel being dismissed in 2017. They Might Be Giants' case against Josh Thew was dropped in early 2019.

== Event history ==
| Dates | Location | Atten. | Performers |
|---|---|---|---|
| August 25, 2007 | Tim and Terry's; Gainesville, Florida | 50+/- | Bushido Stylus, Emergency Pizza Party, MagiTek, MC Koga, Ultralaser, Rocket Propelled Geeks, MC Wreckshin, mCRT, CSHC, Random, Sir-Up, Select Start, High-C, Krondor Krew, ZeaLouS1 |
| September 22, 2007 | Kate Buchanan Room at Humboldt State University; Arcata, California | 100+ | Dungeon Master, Josiah the Messiah, the Department of Motor Vehicles, the World's Greatest Ghosts, Legendary Wizard, Category, and Pixelh8 |
| June 14, 2008 | Delius Pub; Bradford, UK | 25+ | Amy Fan Flyy, Superpowerless, Dan Plus Add, Combat Dave, Category, The CamPanulas, MisterB |
| July 4 and 5, 2008 | Taste Restaurant; Orlando, Florida | 300+ | Architects of Fear, Captain Dan & the Scurvy Crew, chozo_ninpo, CSHC, DJ Snyder, Dual Core, Emergency Pizza Party, Former Fat Boys, funky49 and Redvoid, Harry and the Potters, Killer Robots!, Krondor Krew, Magitek, Marc with a C, Math the Band, MC Frontalot, MC Gigahertz, MC Inadequate, mCRT, Myf, Nora Ricci, Pixelh8, Random, Random Encounter, Rocket Propelled Geeks, Schaffer The Darklord, Sudden Death, The House of Black, Uncle Monsterface, Whoremoans, Wordburglar, YTCracker, ZeaLouS1, Zombies! Organize!! |
| July 11 and 12, 2009 | Holiday Inn Orlando International Drive Hotel; Orlando, Florida | 500+ | Captain Dan & the Scurvy Crew, Confuscious, Devo Spice, Dual Core, Emergency Pizza Party, Epic-1, Fred Lives, Funky49, HDNinja, I Fight Dragons, Krondor Krew, Marc with a C, MagiTek, mc chris, MC Frontalot, MC Gigahertz, MC Lars, mCRT, My Parents Favorite Music, Odd Austin, Schaffer The Darklord, Scrub Club Records, The Grammar Club (Beefy and Shael Riley), The Great Luke Ski, The House of Black, The Megas, The Protomen, The Spork, Uncle Monsterface, YTCracker, ZeaLouS1 |
| July 17 and 18, 2010 | Orlando Airport Marriott; Orlando, Florida | 700+ | MC Frontalot, The Protomen, Yip-Yip, George Hrab, Killer Robots!, Kirby Krackle, The Megas, Schaffer the Darklord, Super 8-Bit Bros., The Adventures of Duane and BrandO, Captain Dan & the Scurvy Crew, Devo Spice, Dr. Awkward, Emergency Pizza Party, 3P!C-1, Fred Lives, The great Luke Ski, HDninja, The House of Black, Krondor Krew, Marc With a C, The Ministry of Magic, My Parents Favorite Music, Positive Attitude, Random / Mega Ran, Random Encounter, Rappy McRapperson, Sci-Fried, King Pheenix, Mad Hatter, StarF, Shael Riley and the Double Ice Backfire, Worm Quartet, ZeaLouS1 and the Bossfights, Zombies! Organize!! |
| July 16 and 17, 2011 | Orlando Airport Marriott; Orlando, Florida | 1000+ | I Fight Dragons feat. Klopfenpop, Metroid Metal, The Protomen, Armcannon, brentalfloss, Koo Koo Kanga Roo, Random, Schaffer The Darklord, ZeaLouS1 and The Bossfights, The OneUps, Action Adventure World, Adam Warrock, Beebs and Her Money Makers, Captain Dan & the Scurvy Crew, Consortium of Genius, Danimal Cannon, Devo Spice, Roborob, DJ Shadowfax, Dual Core, HD Ninja, Illbotz, Insane Ian, Inverse Phase, Jeux On, Krondor Krew, Marc with a C, MC COOL WHIP, My Parent's Favorite Music, Partners in Phyme, Random Encounter, Rappy McRapperson & MC Wreckshin feat. Klopfenpop and Shinobi MC, Sci-Fried, Scrub Club Records (StarF, King Pheenix, MadHatter, HD Ninja, Emergency Pizza Party, and Klopfenpop), Shinobi Ninja, Soup or Villains, The Amazing BrandO, The great Luck Ski, The Side Quest |
| August 4 and 5, 2012 | The Beacham & The Social; Orlando, Florida | 850+ | Koo Koo Kanga Roo, Math the Band, Metroid Metal, The NESkimos, The Protomen, Bit Brigade, brentalfloss and the Cartridge Family, Danimal Cannon, No More Kings, Schaffer The Darklord, The Megas, The OneUps, YTCracker, Adam Warrock, Armcannon, Beebs and Her Money Makers, Benjamin Briggs, Captain Dan & the Scurvy Crew, D&D Sluggers, Descendants of Erdrick, DJ Cutman, Dj Roborob, Klopfenpop, MC Wreckshin, King Pheenix, Joey Z, Steffo, 8-bit Duane, Frogsuit, DJ Spice, Dual Core, Frogsuit, Geekapella, Marc with a C, Random, Professor Shy Guy, R. Garcia, Random Encounter, Sci-Fried, Team Rock-It, The Money Boys, The ThoughtCriminals (Mikal kHill & Sulfur), Those Who Fight, Tribe One |
| October 19 and 20, 2013 | Orange County Convention Center; Orlando, Florida | 1234 | They Might Be Giants, MC Frontalot, Shinobi Ninja, Nerf Herder, Schaffer The Darklord, MC Lars, The Protomen, Bit Brigade, brentalfloss, The OneUps, Adam Warrock, Benjamin Briggs, DJ Roborob, Random Encounter Emergency Pizza Party, King Pheenix, My Parents Favorite Music, Marc with a C, Random, Professor Shy Guy, 1-Up Creative Mindframe, Blake Boston aka Scumbag Steve, Big Damn Heroes, Press B, Doug Funnie, Sci-Fried |
