= Amplitude Problem =

Swedish-American musician and producer (born 1974)

- Also known as: Amplitude Problem
- Born: Juan Irming; December 14, 1974 (age 51)
- Origin: Malmö, Sweden
- Genres: chiptune, synthwave, Nerdcore, cybersynth, hip hop, video game music
- Occupations: composer, record producer, software engineer
- Instruments: musical keyboard, keytar, Atari SAP music format
- Years active: 1986–present
- Website: http://amplitudeproblem.com/

Juan Irming (born December 14, 1974), also known as Amplitude Problem, is a Swedish-American musician and producer currently based in Los Angeles. While the former hacker has had a long career in music beginning in the underground demoscene in Europe, he is best known for his chiptune, synthwave, and nerdcore tracks.

== Biography ==
=== 1974 - 1992: Early Life ===
Juan Irming was born to Swedish parents on the Spanish island Mallorca in 1974. In the '80s, Irming began to frequent a local computer store in Malmö called Computer Corner. The store had an Atari 130XE in the window that Irming was able to program with scrolling text displaying the store name. The store owners were so impressed, they brought the preteen on as a paid programmer. It was at this time Irming discovered his life-long passion for computer engineering which eventually led him to the demoscene, phone hacking (phreaking), early cracking underground, and computer hacker subculture in Europe.

Amplitude Problem's track Computer Corner was a tribute to the store's impact on his formative years as a young hacker. The music video for the song was created by German pixel artist Valenberg, the artist for the point-and-click cyberpunk video game VirtuaVerse.

=== 1992 - Present: Immigration to US ===
Juan Irming immigrated to the United States from Sweden in the early '90s, to attend Musicians Institute in Hollywood. After his graduation, he spent time to focus on fatherhood and his programming career. Following his steps, his son, Maxwell "Max James" Irming also earned his degree at Musicians Institute and has pursued a professional career in software engineering and music production. The duo performed on the main stage together at the 2019 DEF CON 27 gathering in Las Vegas.

Irming resides in Los Angeles, California and currently works as a senior level software engineer and continues to produce music.

== Music ==
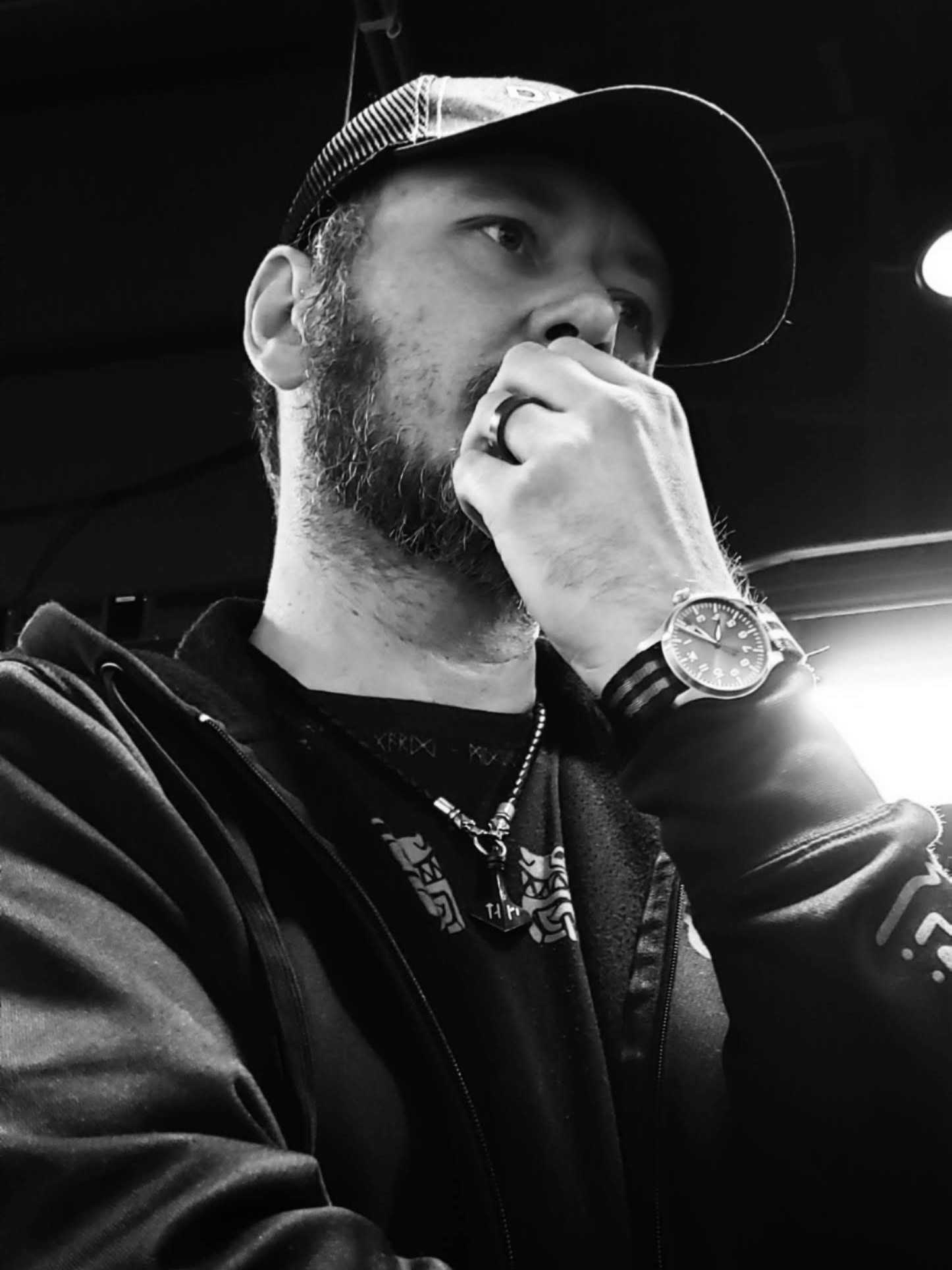
Juan Irming participating at a Global Game Jam as a music producer in 2019.

=== 1986 - 1993: Demoscene and early career ===
Juan Irming, known at the time as 7an, began in the European demoscene in the late '80s as a member and composer for the Atari ST demo crew and hacking group SYNC. Irming's "tracker music" placed first in several demo music contests. It was during this era that Irming began to make extensive use of vintage home computer hardware such as the Commodore 64, Atari 130XE, and the Atari ST in his productions, favoring the SID6581 and YM2149 computer sound chips to create a distinctive style of chiptune music.

=== 2014 - Present: Chiptune, Synthwave, and Nerdcore ===
In 2014, Juan Irming, under the new moniker Amplitude Problem, would produce music for American hacker and nerdcore rapper YTCracker and other artists. Amplitude Problem has composed and produced video game inspired synth and chiptune tracks for a number of projects and records. Amplitude Problem produced YTCracker's cyberpunk album Introducing Neals which released on November 5, 2014 on Guy Fawkes Day.

Amplitude Problem's Crime of Curiosity (2019) features well-known American hacker Loyd Blankenship, also known as The Mentor, reading his essay The Hacker Manifesto (originally titled The Conscience of a Hacker) which serves as a guideline and moral code of hackers around the world. Crime of Curiosity is also featured as the official soundtrack to the demoscene history book THE CRACKERS: The Art of Cracking from 1984–1994.

Amplitude Problem produced the album Blue Bots Dots which released in 2015 and garnered favorable reviews. In 2017, he followed-up with the nu jazz album The Frequency Modulators Orchestra, Vol. 1 which critics have described as "an artificial world of high-tech joy, pop music for Donkey Kong to jam to." Tracks from the album aired on FM jazz radio stations across the United States.

In 2020, Irming launched a folktronica side-project titled Cybard, with a cover of the video game Assassin's Creed Valhalla soundtrack and a full-length album, CMLXXXIV. This was followed up by the release of a cover of the video game Valheim soundtrack. Both games heavily feature Viking and Norse themes.

Amplitude Problem has been featured on albums alongside artists like Mitch Murder, Lazerhawk and GUNSHIP. He has appeared live at events and venues such as DEF CON, Comic Con, and Game On Expo with YTCracker, Dual Core, and MC Frontalot. Influences include first-generation chip composers Rob Hubbard, Ben Daglish, Martin Galway and Maniacs of Noise in addition to electronic, industrial, jazz and hip hop acts such as Damokles, Kraftwerk, Jean-Michel Jarre, Alphaville, Depeche Mode, Nine Inch Nails, Herbie Hancock and Public Enemy. He has called his own work "retro-future music for geeks, cyberpunks and the occasional normal human being."

== Discography ==
- Hold Down the Sun (2020)
- DEF CON 27 Soundtrack (2019) (various artists)
- World Builder (2019) (solo effort)
- Crime of Curiosity (2019) (featuring Inverse Phase and other demoscene/hacking artists)
- Descendants of Funk (2018) (various artists)
- Collision Theory (2017) (various artists)
- The Frequency Modulators Orchestra, Vol. 1 (2017) (solo effort)
- Hear the Living Dead (2016) (various artists)
- Synchron Assembly (2016) (solo effort)
- Chip Wars (2015) (various artists)
- I Fight for the Users (2015) (various artists)
- Grid Knights (2015) (various artists)
- Coastal Keys (2015) (various artists)
- Carpenter (2015) (various artists)
- Blue Bots Dots (2015) (solo effort)
- The Next Peak (2015) (various artists)
- Introducing Neals (2014) (composition and production for YTCracker)
