= Adam WarRock =

American rapper

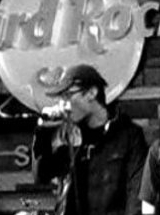
- Adam WarRock on stage at Kracklefest 2011

Background information
- Born: Eugene K. Ahn; October 21, 1980 (age 45); Pittsburgh, Pennsylvania
- Genres: Nerdcore, Hip hop
- Occupations: Rapper, songwriter
- Years active: 2010–2016

Eugene K. Ahn, better known by his stage name Adam WarRock, (born October 21, 1980) is an American nerdcore rapper. In 2010 he left his job as a lawyer to pursue a full-time career as an independent musical artist.

== Early life ==
Ahn was born in Pittsburgh but raised in Memphis.

== Education ==
He graduated from Ohio State University with a Bachelor of Science in Business Marketing in 2003, and from Emory University School of Law with a Juris Doctor in 2007.

== Legal career ==
In 2006 he was a legal clerk for the American Federation of Teachers. In 2008 he served as an Attorney Advisor for National Lawyers at the Democratic National Committee headquarters in Washington D.C., was an organizer and member of the Asian Pacific American Labor Alliance Political Action Committee, and served as an Attorney Advisor for Barack Obama's Presidential Campaign.

After graduating from law school he worked at a small litigation and employment law firm called Mooney, Green, Baker & Saindon, P.C. in Washington, D.C. from 2007 to 2010.

== Music career ==
In 2000, while in college, he began making independent music as a side project and continued through to his legal job. During his time with the law firm, he was also producing and co-hosting a comic book podcast called War Rocket Ajax with comic book writer Chris Sims. As part of this, he began to make rap songs and decided to adopt an appropriate stage name. Ahn selected the name Adam WarRock, after the Marvel Comics character Adam Warlock and name of the podcast (War Rocket Ajax). Ahn registered his new stage name as a website and used it to keep his musical career separate from his real name and legal career.

From 2013 to 2014 he was a Student Orientation Media Consultant at Rutgers University, served as a Media Consultant, Performer, and Organizer for the second annual GeeKon event at the University of North Texas, and was a Publicity and Marketing Consultant for Oni Press. From 2014 to 2015 he was an Intern for Student Life at Rutgers University where he coordinated major events with students and administration. From 2009 to 2015 he was a performer for Silver Age Records.

== Rapper ==
B.S.F.X.
A short sample of "B.S.F.X." from Adam WarRock's third album The Middle of Nowhere (2013).

With his two careers each taking up more time, he decided that the creative one was the more fulfilling. In an interview he said, "Everything I wanted to do out there in the world was being prevented simply because I had this job. And it was a job that I didn't really enjoy in the first place." Noting however, "There are things I still very much believe in about the legal profession, and it has undeniably made me a smarter, better organized, savvier person, but there is this lack of focus and epidemic of bad management in the legal industry that makes it unbearable to people who, like me, can visualize and see things beyond a paycheck and a secure lifestyle."

As a result, in 2010, Ahn quit his job with the law firm to pursue a full-time career as an independent musical artist. His job as a self-employed independent artist is less secure than his career in law, which Ahn has described as "scary". He does not necessarily recommend it to others, saying, "Now, I think I should say this: It's a very bad idea to do this. So don't take this story as inspiration to quit your job in a brash and impulsive manner," but, "If you have something you love doing, and think you got the chops to back it up, put your stuff out there" Describing the nature of his work, he says "You wake up and think: 'What am I going to create today?' [...] [the website is] a place for quick turnarounds where I can capitalise on topicality."

Most tracks are released for free on his website, usually on a subject within geek culture or wider pop culture. He has also released a few studio albums.

== Other work ==
Ahn was an early contributor to the "Fake AP Stylebook" Twitter feed because he was friends with the creators. As a result, he is also a contributor to the spin-off website The Bureau Chiefs and print book Write More Good (2011).

From 2016 to 2019 he was a social media coordinator and video manager at Cabrini University.

Since 2019 he has been a publicist for the Media Relations Department at the Berklee College of Music.

== Discography ==
In addition to a large number of individual tracks and several EPs, WarRock has released three studio albums to date:

1. War For Infinity (2010)
2. You Dare Call That Thing Human?!? (2012)
3. The Middle of Nowhere (2013)
4. 24 Hour Rap-A-Thon 2014 (2014)

=== War For Infinity ===
A concept album inspired by his stage name and his namesake's comic storylines.

No.	Title	Length
1.	"I Am Him"	3:17
2.	"Absolute Truth"	4:10
3.	"Bad Mother (Villainy)"	3:27
4.	"The View From Eternity"	2:36
5.	"Battle (Introductions)"	5:15
6.	"Crooked Deal"	3:14
7.	"Special Bulletin"	3:17
8.	"Heroes Requiem"	5:05
9.	"Battle (Reprise)"	3:40
10.	"Laxidazia"	3:13
11.	"Up & Adam"	4:02
12.	"Battle (Finale)"	3:27
13.	"Lady Death Never Wanted Me As a Lover"	5:57
14.	"The Silver Age" (featuring Tribe One)	3:50
15.	"Ira Glass" (bonus track)	4:00

=== You Dare Call That Thing Human?!? ===
No.	Title	Length
1.	"On the Subject of Normal..."	2:24
2.	"Human?!?"	1:54
3.	"Retcon"	3:59
4.	"616"	3:59
5.	"The Kids Table" (featuring Doctor Awkward)	3:52
6.	"Booster Gold" (featuring Mikal kHill)	4:10
7.	"I Kill Giants"	3:41
8.	"MLF" (featuring Beefy & int80)	3:35
9.	"Sensitive Side"	3:57
10.	"Civil War" (featuring Tribe One & Gary Samurai)	4:36
11.	"Beast I.Z."	4:13
12.	"Snows of Kilimanjaro" (featuring MC Lars)	4:11
13.	"Inhuman"	3:40
14.	"Andrew Garfield @ SDCC (Joules remix)" (bonus track)	3:51
15.	"616 (Saturday Morning Remix)" (bonus track)	3:31

=== The Middle of Nowhere ===
No.	Title	Length
1.	"Nowhere" (by James Urbaniak)	2:25
2.	"High School Reunion"	4:22
3.	"B.S.F.X."	3:35
4.	"Shoulda Beens"	2:59
5.	"That Kid, Icarus"	3:37
6.	"How You Die (On the Internet)" (featuring Schaffer the Darklord & int80)	5:10
7.	"J.A.R.V.I.S."	3:52
8.	"Internet Crush"	3:35
9.	"Sinestrocore" (featuring Tribe One)	3:37
10.	"Puzzle" (featuring Amy Gregory)	3:47
11.	"Sticks & Stones"	3:25
12.	"Mutant Massacre"	3:41
13.	"Nuclear Family"	3:38
14.	"Salieri" (featuring MC Frontalot & Louis Logic)	4:06
