= Nerdcore for Life =

Nerdcore For Life
- Directed by: Dan Lamoureux
- Produced by: Dan Lamoureux; Rob Korotky; Kipp Norman; K.C. Norman; Ryan Tidrick
- Edited by: Storyboard Productions
- Distributed by: Journeyman Pictures; IndiePix Films
- Release date: 2008
- Running time: 84 minutes
- Country: United States
- Language: English

Nerdcore for Life is a 2008 documentary film about the world of nerdcore hip-hop directed by Dan Lamoureux and produced by Crapbot Productions.

== About the film ==
Nerdcore For Life explores the world of “geek rap” known as nerdcore hip-hop and features appearances by many of the top names in the genre including Optimus Rhyme, MC Lars, Beefy, MC Chris, MC Router and Ytcracker. Filming took place throughout 2006 and 2007. Nerdcore For Life made its world premiere, April 5, 2008 at the Wisconsin Film Festival.

== Featured artists ==
In all, more than 40 nerdcore artists and producers from across North America make appearances in Nerdcore For Life, including:

MC Plus +, Ytcracker, The Lords of the Rhymes, MC Chris, Ultraklystron, Doctor Popular, MC Hawking, Nursehella, Optimus Rhyme, Beefy, MC Router, Zealous1, Jesse Dangerously, Shael Riley, Baddd Spellah, MC Lars, Former Fat Boys, High-C, Nomad, The Sucklord, Monzy, MC Tanuki, Krondor Krew, Maja, Schaffer The Darklord, My Parent's Favorite Music, Ham-Star, Emergency Pizza Party featuring Fanatical, Sir-Up, Benjamin Bear, Betty Rebel and MC Wreckshin.

Brief cameos are made by funky49, MC Gigahertz, the Stunt Junkies, IllGill, The Futuristic Sex Robotz and Rai Kamishiro.

== Viral marketing ==
The documentary gained notoriety on the web and in the media after several videos related to the film spread virally across the Internet. As of August 2010 the trailer for the documentary has been viewed over 850,000 times on YouTube alone.

== DVD release ==
Nerdcore For Life was released on DVD on August 3, 2010. The film is distributed by Journeyman Pictures and Indiepix.
