= Hacker Manifesto =

Manifesto from 1986 by Loyd Blankenship

"The Conscience of a Hacker" (also known as "The Hacker Manifesto") is a short essay written on January 8, 1986, by Loyd Blankenship, a computer security hacker who went by the handle The Mentor, and belonged to the second-generation hacker group Legion of Doom.

It was written after the author's arrest, and first published in the underground hacker ezine Phrack. It can be found on many websites, as well as on T-shirts and in films.

Considered a cornerstone of hacker culture, the Manifesto asserts that there is a point to hacking that supersedes selfish desires to exploit or harm other people, and that technology should be used to expand our horizons and try to keep the world free.

When asked about his motivation for writing the article, Blankenship said

I was going through hacking withdrawal, and Craig/Knight Lightning needed something for an upcoming issue of Phrack. I was reading The Moon Is a Harsh Mistress and was very taken with the idea of revolution.

At a more prominent public event, when asked about his arrest and motivation for writing the article, Blankenship said

I was just in a computer I shouldn't have been. And [had] a great deal of empathy for my friends around the nation that were also in the same situation. This was post–WarGames, the movie, so pretty much the only public perception of hackers at that time was "hey, we're going to start a nuclear war, or play tic-tac-toe, one of the two," and so I decided I would try to write what I really felt was the essence of what we were doing and why we were doing it.

== In popular culture ==
The article is quoted several times in the 1995 movie Hackers, although in the movie it is being read from an issue of the hacker magazine 2600, not the historically accurate Phrack.

The Mentor gave a reading of "The Hacker Manifesto" and offered additional insight at H2K2. It is also an item in the game Culpa Innata.

A poster of "The Hacker Manifesto" appears in the 2010 film The Social Network in the Harvard room of Mark Zuckerberg.

"The Hacker Manifesto" is mentioned in Edward Snowden's autobiography Permanent Record.

Amplitude Problem's 2019 album Crime of Curiosity, featuring The Mentor himself, YTCracker, Inverse Phase and Linux kernel maintainer King Fisher of TRIAD is dedicated to "The Hacker Manifesto". Each song title is a phrase from the essay.

== See also ==
- Hacker ethic
- Timeline of computer security hacker history
