= KKSM =

- Oceanside, California; United States
- Broadcast area: North County San Diego
- Frequency: 1320 kHz

Programming
- Format: Alternative rock, freeform

Ownership
- Owner: Palomar College

History
- First air date: 1956
- Former call signs: KSLR (1956–1958); KUDE (1958–1983); KEZL (1983–1985); KNNC (1985–1986); KGMG (1986–1994); KKLQ (1994–1996)
- Call sign meaning: SM for San Marcos

Technical information
- Licensing authority: FCC
- Facility ID: 51506
- Class: B
- Power: 500 watts
- Transmitter coordinates: 33°12′8.1″N 117°20′20.1″W

Links
- Public license information: Public file; LMS
- Webcast: Listen live
- Website: www.palomar.edu/kksm

KKSM (1320 AM) is a college radio station broadcasting full-time at 1320 kHz from the campus of Palomar College in San Marcos, California, United States. The station, licensed to nearby Oceanside, simulcasts via Cox Cable channel 957 and streams via the internet. Its format includes freeform programs, alternative rock music, and local sports and talk shows; students make up the on-air staff and handle most of the station's operations.

Palomar began broadcasting on 1320 kHz in 1996, when it was donated the former KKLQ AM. The facility had been in Oceanside since 1956 under various call letters and formats, the longest-lasting call sign being KUDE. Palomar's radio program began with the establishment of carrier current and later cable radio station "KSM" in 1976. In 2016, the station operated on a $10,000 budget from the college.

== 1320 kHz in Oceanside ==
On November 2, 1955, the Federal Communications Commission (FCC) granted an application from the San Luis Rey Broadcasting Company to build a new 500-watt AM radio station on 1320 kHz in Oceanside. The station began broadcasting as KSLR in June 1956. It was sold to Pacific Broadcasters in 1958 and changed its call sign to KUDE; the next year, it was acquired by the Dolph-Pettey Broadcasting Company. A companion FM station, KUDE-FM 102.1, was established in 1962.

KUDE and the FM station, then known as KJFM, were acquired by Par Broadcasting Corporation in 1982. Writing for North County Magazine, Ken Leighton described KUDE as "an automated country station that was not held in high esteem by those in the broadcasting community". The two stations were relaunched as KEZL with an adult standards format until the FM flipped to adult contemporary in 1984. Larry Shushan, the general manager, then overhauled KEZL AM as KNNC "K-News North County" in 1985. The idea was to give North County a localized version of an all-news station, much like the popular KNX in Los Angeles. However, ratings were poor.

As a result of the low ratings, KEZL and KNNC dropped their formats in 1986 and became a simulcasting oldies station, "Magic 102", with KGMG call letters. The nostalgic music format survived an intended format flip in 1989 after more than 1,000 listener comments were received.

In 1994, the nostalgia format was ended for a simulcast of another station Par Broadcasting owned, KKLQ-FM 106.5.

== History of radio at Palomar College ==
In 1976, "KSM" began as the carrier current radio station at Palomar College. It first broadcast from a closet in the former drama lab. By the late 1980s, it was only available outside of campus as a cable radio channel on the local Cox cable system. During the week, it aired blocks of Top 40, alternative, and album-oriented rock formats, along with specialty programming on weekends.

Par Broadcasting agreed to acquire six radio stations from Compass Radio Group, including San Diego's KCBQ-AM-FM, in late 1995. In order to meet ownership limits, Par had to divest itself of KKLQ AM, and Par negotiated to donate it to Palomar College. The transaction took effect on April 1, 1996, when 1320 was turned over to Palomar College and became KKSM, bringing the former KSM format to a broadcast facility.

Famous alumni of KKSM include Fox Sports announcer Jeanne Zelasko; network TV voice Erik Thompson; adult film star and Playboy Radio host Kylie Ireland; and nerdcore rapper Zealous1.

== Coverage ==
Coverage is along a crescent-shaped area stretching in a north–south direction from San Juan Capistrano to La Jolla and in an east–west direction from Interstate 15 to the coast. The 500-watt tower was designed to be heard in boats offshore.

== Accolades ==
KKSM was recognized in 1996 as one of the five best college radio stations in the U.S. by the National Association of Broadcasters. In 2013, the station won the Golden Microphone award from the Intercollegiate Broadcasting System for Best Community College Station.

== See also ==
- Campus radio
- List of college radio stations in the United States
