= Sci-Fried =

American band

Sci-Fried is an American Independent music geek rock band from Orlando, Florida, United States, that performs original and parody songs with lyrics mostly about pop culture, science fiction, video games and comic books.

== Musical style ==
Sci-Fried's music is mainstream rock, infused with metal, punk, ska, reggae, comedy, nerdcore and alternative rock. Their lyrics are humorous and sometimes profane.

== Personnel ==
- Dr Vern—vocals
- Chuck Silver—guitar
- Jim Frederick—percussion
- Daniel Dolan—guitar/keyboard/vocals
- Sunni Simmons—Bass

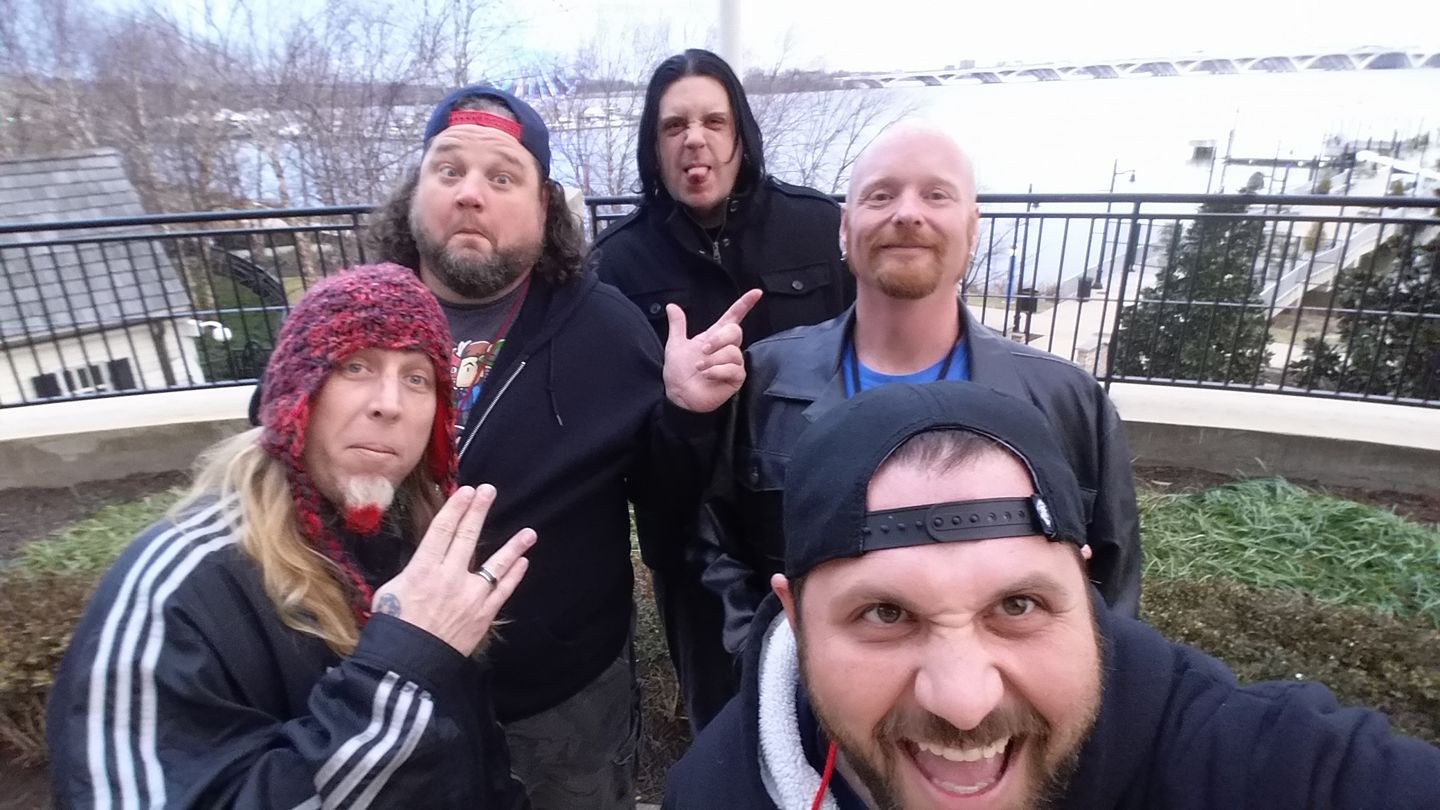
The Sci-Fried Band

== Discography ==
- Ramming Speed
- Geeks Unite
- Future Tense
- Co-Op Mode
- Season V

== Reviews ==
Sci-Fried was reviewed by the Seminole Chronicle.
Sci-Fried's third album, Future Tense, was reviewed by Michael Melchor and the article was published in the Seattle PI.

Sci-Fried's fourth album, Co-Op Mode was reviewed by Michael Melchor, and the article was published in the Orlando Rock Music Examiner.

== Awards ==
Sci-Fried was named Breakout Artist of the Year in 2010, and Best Metal Act in 2010, 2011, and 2012 by the Orlando Weekly.

== Shows ==
Sci-Fried has Headlined at many fan Conventions including Star Wars Celebration V and VI, Emerald City Comic Con, Dragon*Con, Gencon, Florida Super Con, New Orleans Comic Con, Creation's Star Trek Convention in Nashville, and Sci-Fried was the house band at Creation's Official Star Trek Convention in Las Vegas for 2015. They have performed at music festivals including Orlando Nerd Fest 2014, Ongaku Overdrive, Pixelated, and Nerdapalooza in 2010, 2011, 2012, and 2013. When reviewing this show, GeekDad (writing for Wired) described the band as 'a jewel in the crown of southeastern geek music with their intoxicating blend of roots rock, heavy metal and musical comedy.' In addition to Conventions and Music Festivals, Sci-Fried has performed at many traditional music venues including longstanding rock venues such as Churchill's Pub in Miami, Gasoline Alley in Tampa, and the Hard rock live in Orlando and Seattle.

Sci-Fried has also won Best Video at Creation's Las Vegas Star Trek Convention in 2008, 2009, 2010, 2011. Best Video at Gatecon the Official Stargate Convention in Vancouver 2010. The Band was invited to Syfy/USA headquarters in New York City following the release of their song "Saturday Night on Syfy", where they presented the channel with an autographed guitar and an acoustic show.
