= Dan Maynes-Aminzade =

American rapper

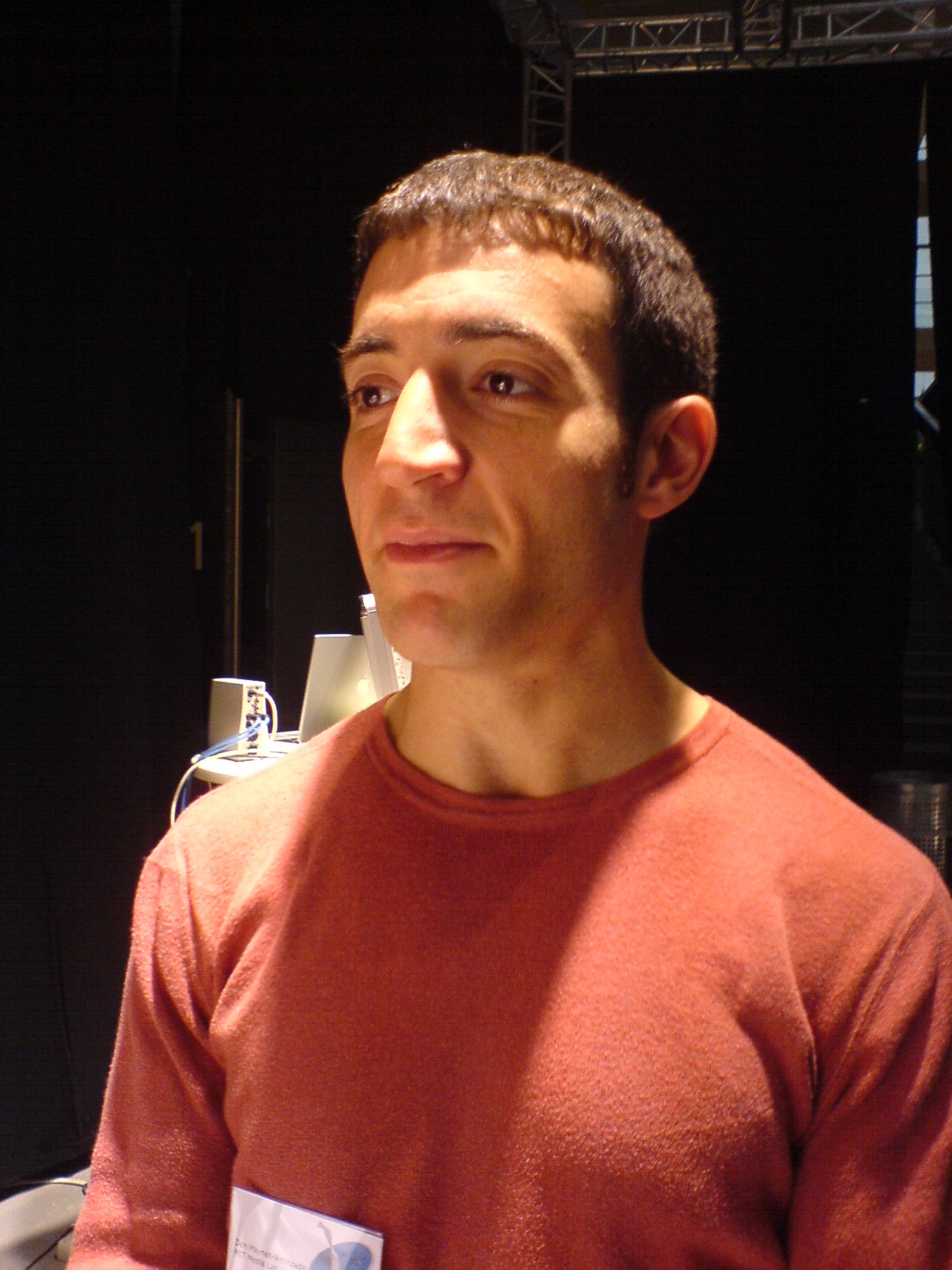
- Dan Maynes-Aminzade in 2005
- Born: 1979 (age 46–47)
- Other name: Monzy

Dan Maynes-Aminzade (/ˌɑːmɪnˈzɑːdi/ AH-min-ZAH-dee; born in 1979), mononymously known as Monzy, is a nerdcore hip hop artist and software engineer at Facebook.

== Professional history ==
Dan received his PhD from Stanford University in September 2008. His Ph.D. is titled Interactive Visual Prototyping of Computer Vision Applications.

Dan received his master's degree from MIT, where he was a member of the Tangible Media Group at the MIT Media Lab under the direction of Professor Hiroshi Ishii from 2001 to 2003. There he worked on the Actuated Workbench, a device that uses magnetic forces to move objects on a table around in two dimensions.

Dan received his bachelor's degree from Carnegie Mellon University, where his research advisor was Randy Pausch; his Undergraduate Honors Thesis is titled "Techniques for Interactive Audience Participation".

From 1997 to 2001 he was a member of Stage 3 Research Group, based at Carnegie Mellon's Human-Computer Interaction Institute. There he worked on new techniques for interactive audience participation.

== Nerdcore hip-hop ==
Monzy made his hip-hop debut with Drama in the PhD which called out his musical rival MC Plus+. It gained large popularity after being described as "the best fucking thing I've ever heard" by LiveJournal creator Brad Fitzpatrick. It eventually made it into a Wired magazine article, and Monzy was interviewed for a segment on the German television program Taff. He was also mentioned in the February 2006 issue of EE Times, an academic and industry-oriented publication dedicated to issues in the field of Electrical Engineering.

On January 10, 2006, Monzy performed at the DivX, Inc. booth of the Consumer Electronics Show in Las Vegas, Nevada, along with other nerdcore artists. With Karl Olson acting as a mediator, Monzy and MC Plus+ finally ended their rivalry and performed together on the same stage.

- "Kill Dash Nine" (appears on Rhyme Torrents Vol.1)

== Strava running route analytics ==
Daniel "Monzy" Aminzade also created a number of popular leaderboards/analytics websites for tracking running/cycling routes based on Strava data. hhpcounter.com is the official counter for mayorship on the HHP (Heron's Head Park) running route in San Francisco, while bayloops.com tracks the runners doing the "Bay Loop" in Palo Alto. During the COVID-19 lockdowns he created longtinyloop.com to track runners achieving interesting running circuits, rewarding certain characteristics, in their own neighbourhoods.

== Media coverage ==
- Zipern, Andrew. "At MIT, Making Fun of the Alma Mater" The New York Times December 3, 2001.
- Newitz, Annalee. "Sex Studies at MIT" San Francisco Bay Guardian December 13, 2001.
- Orlowski, Andrew (May 27, 2003). "WCs meet PCs: converged tech toilets show promise". The Register.
- Maxim Magazine "Streaming Video" Maxim Magazine August, 2003.
- TechTV Hot Click TechTV October, 2003.
- Andrews, Robert (June 23, 2005). "Rap Marketing Comes to Nerdcore". Wired.
- Reed, Bryan. "Nerdcore Hip-Hop" The Daily Tarheel December 8, 2005.
- Clendenin, Mike. "Geeksta Rappers Rhyme Tech Talk" EE Times February 13, 2006.
- Nguyen, Thuy-Dzuong. "Nerdcore rap helps dorky losers spit mad game" Gonzaga Bulletin March 24, 2006.
- Darling, Cary. "Beats and Geeks" The Fort Worth Star-Telegram February 18, 2007.
- Silverberg, David. "Beats, Geeks, and Freaks" NOW Magazine April 26, 2007.
- Neill, Huw. "Nerdcore for Life" Canvas Magazine April, 2007.
- Miranda, Jeff. "Refrain of the Nerds" The Boston Globe November 4, 2007.
- Ding, Mike "Only for the 'Nerdcore'" The Stanford Daily November 14, 2007
