= Brazilian rap geek =

Music genre

Rap geek (also known as rap nerd or rap de anime) is a subgenre of Brazilian hip-hop characterized by lyrical themes associated with nerd, geek and otaku culture, in a manner comparable to nerdcore in the United States. Its lyrics commonly address elements of popular culture, including anime, comic books, video games, and films. Performances frequently adopt a narrative perspective in which the artist assumes the role or viewpoint of a fictional character, recounting that character's story. It is predominantly disseminated through YouTube, often accompanied by music videos featuring scenes related to the subject matter, many of which consist of edited compilations of anime or film footage.

The earliest known examples of Brazilian rap geek were produced by the YouTube channel Flick, which released songs inspired by Dragon Ball since 2011. However, the genre gained broader recognition and popularity through the YouTube channels Player Tauz and 7 Minutoz, whose success influenced the emergence of numerous subsequent artists and channels.
