= The OneUps =

American video game cover band

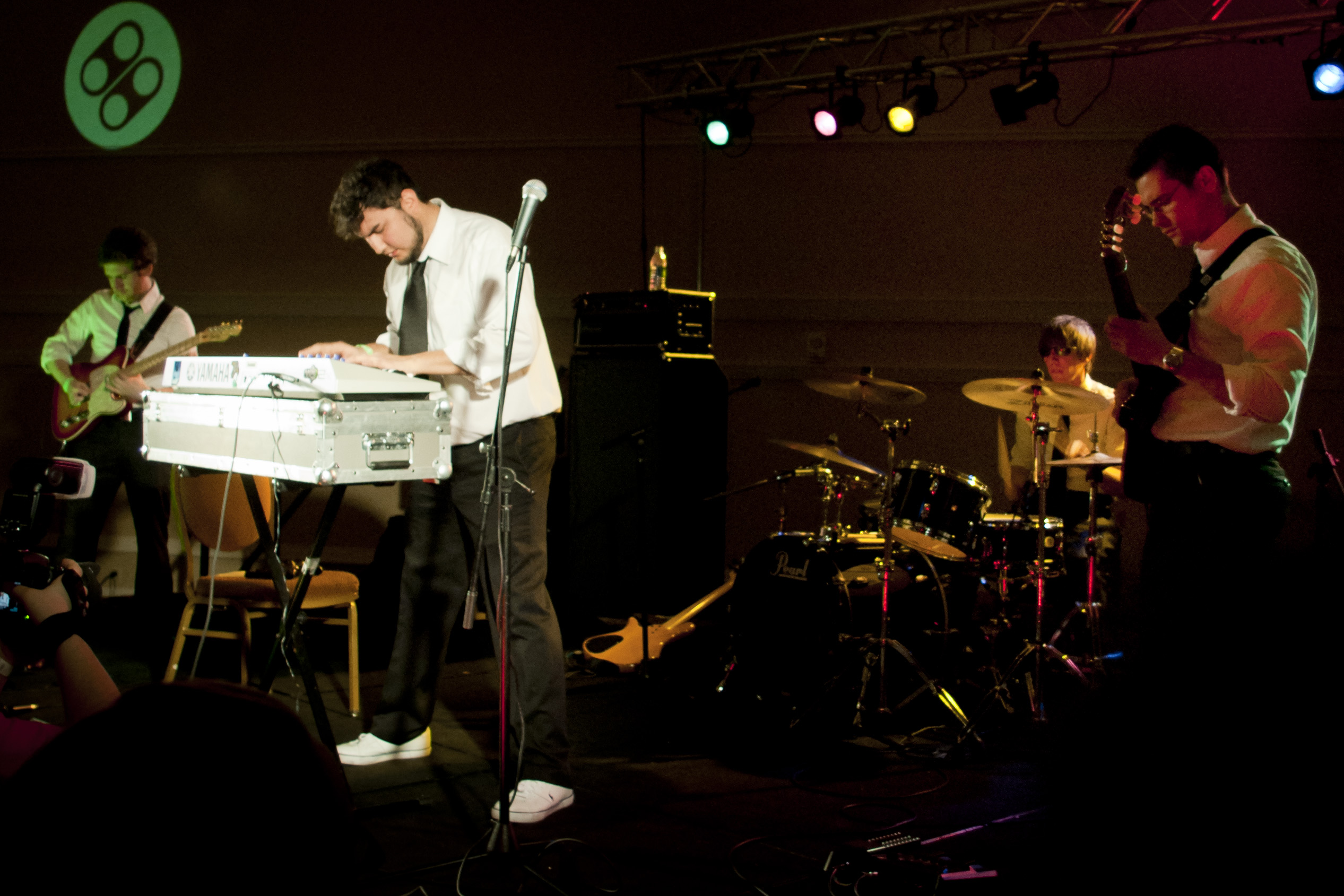
- The OneUps performing at MAGFest in 2012.

Background information
- Origin: Fayetteville, Arkansas
- Genres: Funk; jazz; video game music
- Years active: 2000–present
- Label: Troggo Studio
- Members: Jared Dunn; Mustin; Tim Yarbrough; William Reyes; Anthony Lofton
- Past members: Nathan McLeod; Greg Kennedy; Matthew Bridges
- Website: theoneups.com

The OneUps (originally known as One Up Mushrooms) is an independent video game cover band, which primarily covers songs from classic video games of the 1980s and 1990s in funk and jazz styles.

== History ==
The band was formed in Fayetteville, Arkansas in 2000 by Mustin, McLeod and Reyes, then still in college. The group initially got together to perform covers of the Super Mario Kart soundtrack. The group performed at smaller venues such as dive bars initially. The OneUps were one of three bands to perform at the inaugural MAGFest in 2002. The group continued performing at smaller events throughout the 2000s and released two albums, though these sold poorly. When they were invited to perform live at the Penny Arcade Expo in 2007, they intended it to be their final performance. However, the experience of performing in front of 5,000 people and the sudden uptick in album sales led the band to continue.

The band performed at numerous other events, becoming a recurring performance at MAGFest throughout the 2010s and continuing to release albums. This included Super Mario Kart Album in 2010, for which the band recorded a music video. The OneUps were featured on Chrono Trigger tribute album Chronicles of Time, which raised money for Doctors Without Borders. Tommy Tallarico requested that the group contribute to the 2017 vinyl reissue of the Earthworm Jim soundtrack, and the OneUps ultimately recorded a cover of What the Heck for Side C of the collection. The band released a 20th anniversary compilation album in 2022, simply entitled "20", including one track from each of their eight studio albums. 20 was released as a limited run vinyl edition only.

== Musical style ==
The OneUps perform covers of video game music, which have been described as fusion, funk and jazz. The group makes common use of keyboards and a saxophone.

== Discography ==
=== Studio albums ===
- Volume 1 (2005)
- Volume 2 (2008)
- Super Mario Kart Album (2010)
- Intergalactic Redux (2011)
- Intergalactic Continuum (2012)
- Songs for the Recently Deceased (2014)
- Part Seven (2016)
- Volume 4 (2019)
- Arkadia Retrocade (2022)

== See also ==
- Video game music culture
