= Koo Koo (duo) =

American kids' comedy disco duo

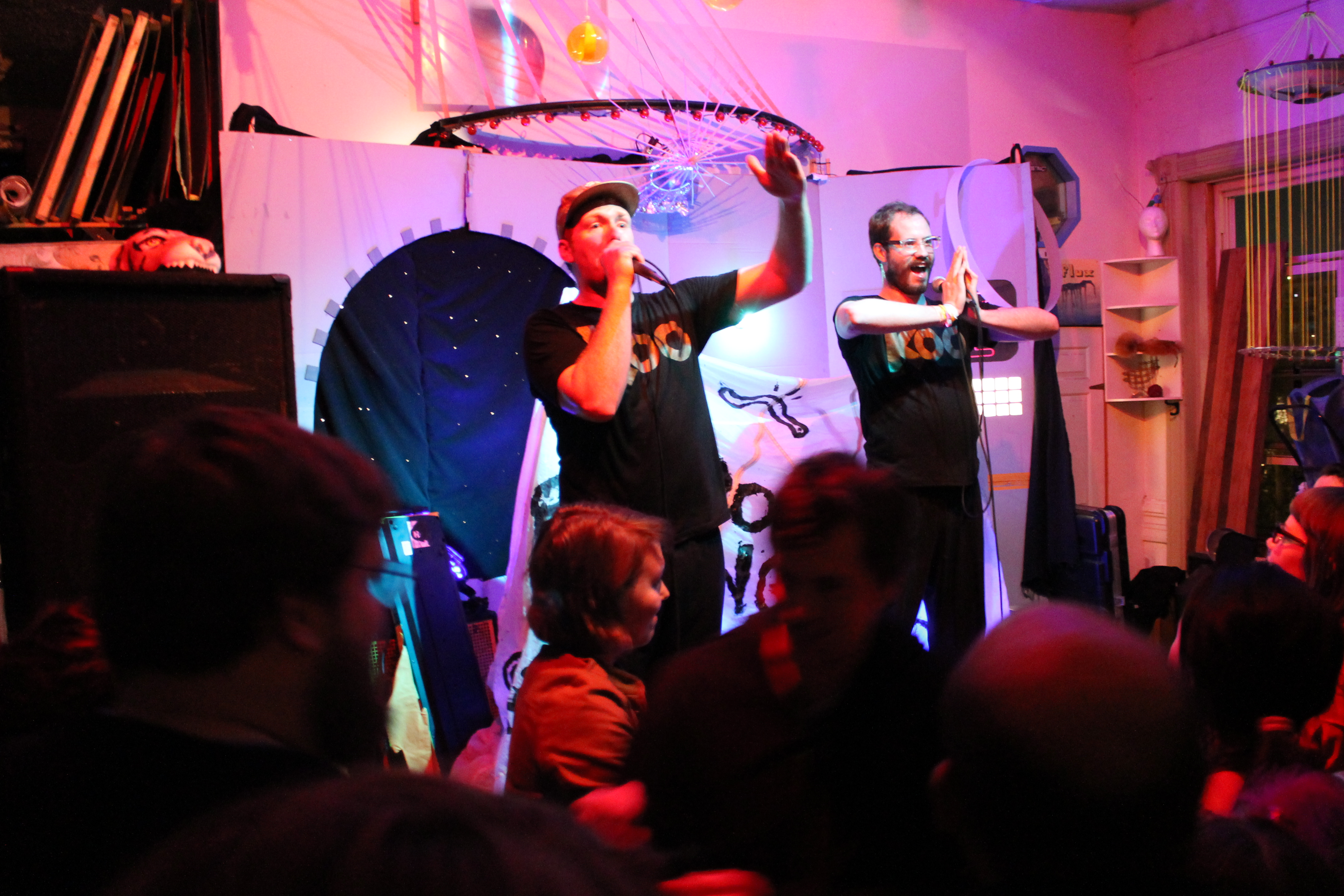
- Koo Koo performing in 2012. From left to right: Bryan and Neil

Background information
- Origin: Minneapolis, Minnesota, U.S.
- Genres: EDM, dance pop, hip-hop, pop, synth-pop
- Years active: 2009–present
- Members: Bryan Atchison; Neil Olstad
- Website: kookoo.pizza

Koo Koo (formerly Koo Koo Kanga Roo) is an American kids' pop, EDM and hip-hop comedy disco duo from Minneapolis, Minnesota, consisting of vocalists Bryan Atchison and Neil Olstad.

Billed as an "interactive dance party duo" and described as "the Beastie Boys meet Sesame Street", Koo Koo showcase a colorful live show that relies heavily on audience participation, featuring overtly silly sing-along songs that are typically accompanied by their own individual dance move. The duo has toured nationwide, performing for both children's events and at mainstream music clubs with rock and punk bands.

== Overview ==
Koo Koo have defined themselves foremost as a live band, with their performances and audience interaction being the pure core of the group, even more so than their recorded music. Bryan and Neil are the only members of Koo Koo, and thus perform all of their songs against pre-recorded backing tracks played from their iPods over the venue's PA system. The duo's songs are written explicitly for the purposes of audience participation, featuring sing-along verses and/or choruses often utilizing a call and response technique, and almost always including a simple dance move unique to each song that Bryan and Neil encourage the audience to follow along with.

The subject matter of Koo Koo's songs rarely stray from juvenile "goofball" territory, covering such topics as cats, dinosaurs, letters of the alphabet, ninjas, food fights, fanny packs, hopscotch, slumber parties and peanut butter and jelly sandwiches. Despite this, Bryan and Neil hesitate to label themselves as a "kid's band", instead referring to Koo Koo as "a kid's band for adults" that aims to connect with all ages. "We shoot for goofy, more than kids' music specifically", Neil elaborated. "It's not about being a kids' thing, it's about being a fun thing". Neil has also mentioned that Koo Koo's songs try to touch on a nostalgia factor for older audiences, drawing on his and Bryan's memories of childhood; one prominent example includes the duo's tradition of throwing a playground parachute into the crowd at the end of their sets, the kind "that you remember from PE class in elementary school".

Appropriately, Koo Koo's merchandise table is just as mired in kid-friendly activity, regularly including such features as a station to make friendship bracelets - where Bryan and Neil strictly enforce a rule that if someone makes a bracelet, they must give it to a person they've never met before - and the "Koo Koo Kamera", a webcam where concert attendees can take their pictures together and have them uploaded to the group's website. Koo Koo also sells a variety of unconventional merchandise, ranging from official coloring books to a "mustache-on-a-stick".

With the exception of Whoopty Whoop, their "greatest hits" compilation Rad-trospective and the 2021 album Slow Clap, none of Koo Koo's music is sold in a physical format, as the group prefer to release all of their recorded music through "pay what you want" downloads on their website, essentially making the entirety of their catalog available for free. According to Bryan, all of their songs are written expressly for their live shows and the audience participation that accompanies them, and thus are never considered outside of that specific context. Although Bryan once said "I'm surprised people can even listen to those songs [outside of performance]", Neil stressed the importance of releasing their music by itself because "[w]e want people to have access to the songs so that they can sing along at the shows. We want them to know all the words. We want people to have the music as immediately as possible".

== History ==
Bryan and Neil created Koo Koo while occupying the same student dormitory at Saint Mary's University of Minnesota. Bonding over their similar tastes in music, the two became quick friends, eventually studying abroad in London and backpacking through Europe together before ultimately deciding to start a band. The duo first formed what they described as an "accessible, non-threatening" "folky pop" ensemble, something they've since derided as a generic and forgettable endeavor. Following that group's disbandment, Bryan and Neil realized they found being in a traditional band a "boring" experience, and set out to start a new musical project together that would be radically different, emphasizing dance-based theatricality, audience interactivity and an unapologetically goofy sense of humor. "We wanted to be entertaining, and have a good time", Neil explained in an interview with The A.V. Club, "That's the premise behind Koo Koo Kanga Roo: including everyone and having a good time". Despite starting out having absolutely no tangible plans or ideas of how to execute this project, Bryan and Neil kept developing the concept until it evolved into what became Koo Koo, drawing various influences from the likes of Of Montreal, The Flaming Lips, Best Fwends, The Cool Kids and Flight of the Conchords.

Along with a consistent output of recorded music, Koo Koo built up a strong word of mouth following by releasing numerous comedy sketches and music videos on YouTube, as well as through relentless local touring, playing venues ranging from traditional music venues and 21+ clubs to children's birthday parties, preschools and elementary schools, to weddings, nursing homes and church basements. In 2009, the group began touring out of state, eventually striking up a touring relationship with the family-friendly superhero rock band The Aquabats, playing numerous shows with them across the nation in 2010 and 2011 as well as accompanying them on tour supporting ska punk band Reel Big Fish and a ten-day stint performing on the Yo Gabba Gabba! live tour.

As the group regularly performs in front of adult audiences on tour, Koo Koo have met with a polarizing reception from punk and rock crowds, leading the Dallas Observer to label them "the epitome of the love them or hate them musical act". In the fall of 2013, Koo Koo were selected to be the opening act on an American tour with popular folk punk artists Frank Turner and The Smith Street Band, where the duo played before large venues to audiences that were typically hostile towards their seemingly out-of-place appearance. "People don't know what to make of them", Turner mentioned in an interview, "They've booed them. I don't care. I love them". When asked how the duo responds to hecklers, Neil replied "We ask people who are having a good time to go over and hug those angry guys".

On October 2, 2013, Koo Koo independently published their own children's book, Unicorns R Real, which was followed shortly thereafter by the DVD release of House Party with Koo Koo, a tongue-in-cheek "dance-a-long" workout video featuring seventeen of the group's songs. Early the following year, it was announced that the duo had signed to Fun Fun Records, a children's music-oriented offshoot of noted indie punk label Asian Man Records, to release their third full-length album Whoopty Whoop, which was officially released on May 14. In the summer of 2014, Koo Koo again supported The Aquabats on the East and West coast dates of their "20 Year Anniversary" tour, and in September they returned to the United Kingdom as part of a sixteen show tour opening for Frank Turner.

In 2012 Koo Koo partnered with GoNoodle to distribute and co-create videos for a number of years, introducing the group to a huge number of teachers, kids, and parents. Some of their more well-known material was created during the partnership with GoNoodle included "Milkshake", "Pop See Ko", "Pop See Ko 2.0", "Roller Coaster", and "Dino Stomp". That partnership formally ended in late 2017, but as of October 2021, Koo Koo videos created during that partnership are still available on GoNoodle channels including the web, mobile apps, Apple TV, and Amazon Fire platforms as well as the GoNoodle YouTube channel.

On September 19, 2023, Bryan and Neil announced that they had shortened the group's name to Koo Koo.

== Discography ==
Albums

- The Everlasting Slumber Party (2009)
- Critters (2012)
- Whoopty Whoop (2014, Asian Man/Fun Fun)
- The Triangle of Success, A Motivational, Inspirational Audio Guide to Achieving Your Dreams (2016)
- Slow Clap (2021)

EPs

- Uncrustable (2010)
- The Golden Staircase of Destiny (2011)
- Midnight Slushie (2011)
- Space Bots & Tater Tots (2012)
- Viral: Songs About Cats and Stuff (2013)
- Cafeterium Songs, Vol. 1 (2015)
- Gross (2015)
- Celebrate This! (2017)
- Cafeterium Songs, Vol. 2 (2018)
- Fast Casual (2018)

Compilations

- Rad-trospective (2014)

Singles

- "All Day Par Tay" (June 2011)
- "Unicorns R Real" (October 2013)
- "Fanny Pack" (February 2014)
- "Face Mask" (September 2020)

== Videography ==
Video releases

- House Party with Koo Koo Kanga Roo (December 2013)

Music videos

- "Rollin' in the Minivan" (November 2008)
- "Cody the Coyote" (August 2009)
- "Lava Tag" (December 2009)
- "Shake Yo Foot" (January 2011)
- "Wiggle It" (February 2011)
- "Push all the Buttons" (March 2011)
- "Pirate Prep" (April 2011)
- "Unicorns r Real" (May 2011)
- "Hopscotch" (June 2011)
- "Awesome Rainbows" (July 2011)
- "Ninja Training (ft. Justin Pierre)" (August 2011)
- "Bestest Friend" (October 2011)
- "Nod Yo Head" (November 2011)
- "What's That You Say?" (December 2011)
- "LMNOP" (January 2012)
- "Dinosaur Stomp" (February 2012) †
- "No Crust" (May 2012)
- "Cat Party" (November 2013) †
- "Fanny Pack" (January 2014)
- "The Coolest Person" (February 2014)
- "Unibrow" (May 2014)
- "Chillax" (September 2014) †
- "Secret Handshakes #1" (September 2014) †
- "Skip Counting" (September 2014) †
- "This Or That" (September 2014) †
- "Get Yo Body Movin'" (September 2014) †
- "Roller Coaster" (October 2014) †
- "Pop See Ko" (November 2014) †
- "Secret Handshakes #2" (September 2014) †
- "Weird Sounds" (September 2014) †
- "I Get Loose" (September 2014) †
- "Secret Handshakes #3" (September 2014) †
- "Shake It Well" (February 2015)
- "Just Kidding" (April 2015) †
- "Wobbly Man" (April 2015) †
- "Birthday Hooray" (April 2015) †
- "Secret Handshakes #4" (April 2015) †
- "Pop See Ko 2.0" (April 2015) †
- "Milkshake" (April 2016) †
- "Superheros Unite" (January 2019)

† - Only available on GoNoodle

== Bibliography ==
- The Koo Koo Kanga Roo Koloring Book: Adventures of Awesomeness and Grandeur!! coloring book (November 2010) - written by Bryan & Neil, illustrated by Mel Potts
- Unicorns R Real children's book (December 2013) - written by Bryan & Neil, illustrated by Mel Potts
- Cat Party children's book (April 2014) - written by Bryan & Neil, illustrated by Mel Potts
