= MC Chris =

American rapper and actor

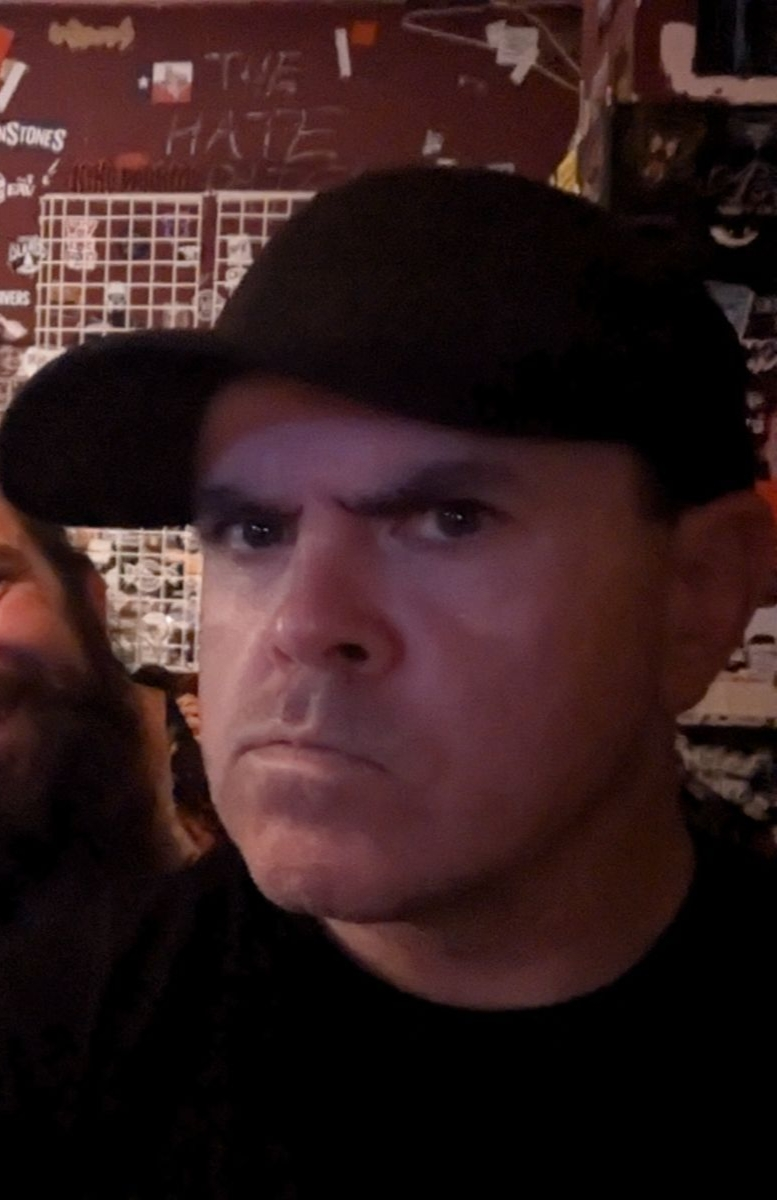
- MC Chris at the Mohawk Place in Buffalo, New York, July 2024

Background information
- Born: Christopher Brendan Ward IV
- Genre: Nerdcore
- Occupations: Rapper; voice actor; comedian; writer
- Years active: 2000–present
- Labels: MC Chris LLC, DC Flag
- Website: mcchris.com

Christopher Brendan Ward IV, better known by the stage name mc chris (stylized in all lower case), is an American rapper, voice actor, comedian, and writer. He is recognized for his high-pitched voice and for blending his "geek” background with a “gangsta rap” persona, contributing to the popularization of the nerdcore genre. He has released ten albums, five EPs, one re-release, and a tenth-anniversary edition of his recordings with the Lee Majors. He is also known for his work on Cartoon Network's Adult Swim programming block.

== Early life ==
Ward was born in Libertyville, Illinois. He attended the School of the Art Institute of Chicago and New York University's Tisch School of the Arts.

== Career ==
=== Voice acting ===
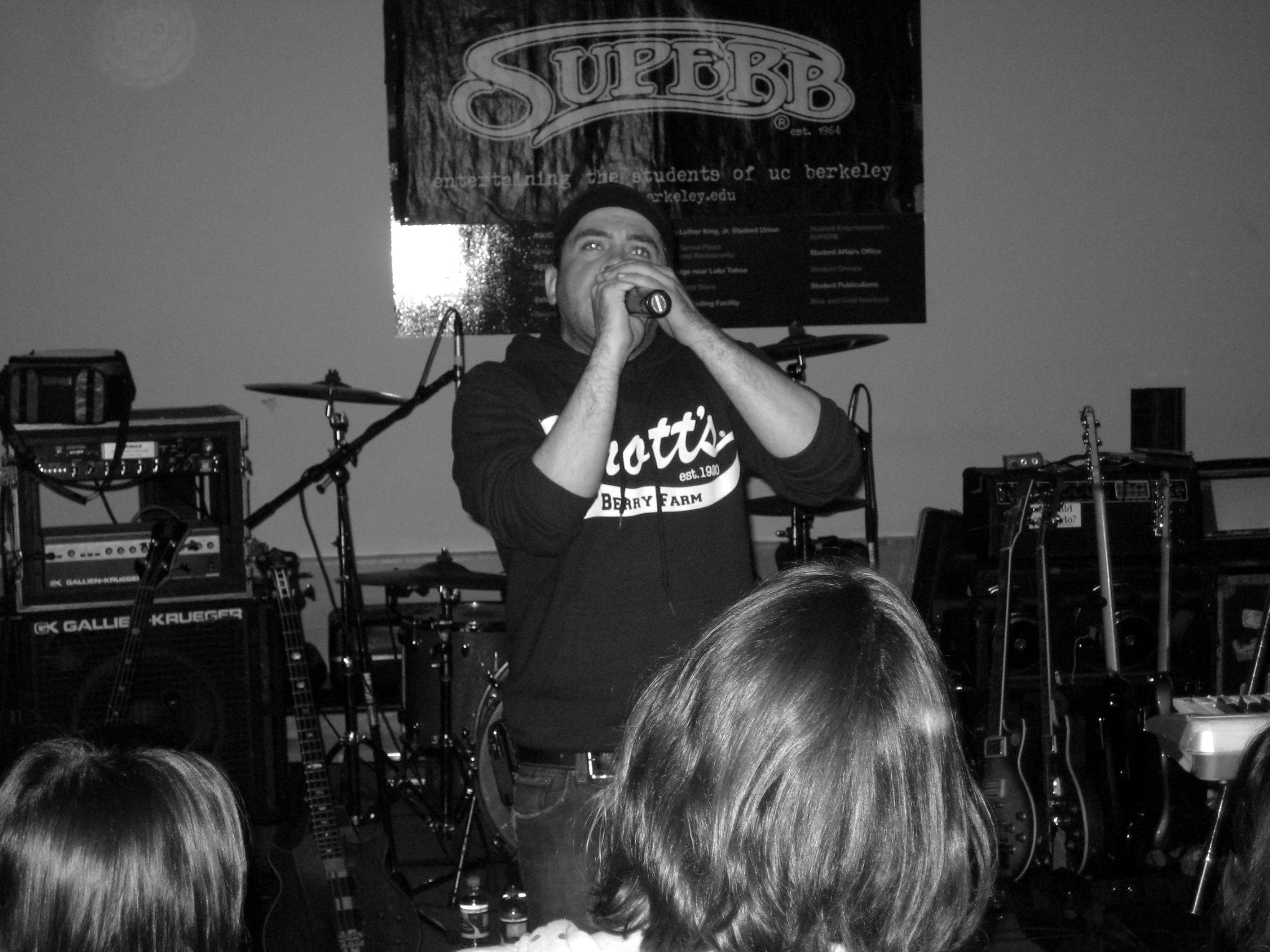
Ward performing in February 2008

Ward contributed to several Williams Street shows on Adult Swim, with his most notable work being on Aqua Teen Hunger Force. He served as a production assistant and voiced the character MC Pee Pants in multiple episodes, including "MC Pee Pants," "Sir Loin," "The Last One," and "Little Brittle". He also voiced the young Carl in episode 18. Ward reprised his role as MC Pee Pants in the feature film Aqua Teen Hunger Force Colon Movie Film for Theaters and the PlayStation 2 game Aqua Teen Hunger Force Zombie Ninja Pro-Am.

He also worked on Sealab 2021, contributing as a writer and voicing the recurring character Hesh Hepplewhite, as well as playing the twins who portray Dolphin Boy in a behind-the-scenes episode. Additionally, Ward was a production assistant and writer for The Brak Show, where he contributed to episodes such as "Brakstreet" and "Shadows of Heat," and voiced a character in "Brakstreet". He also voiced Ward Willoughby in the 2002 pilot for Evan Dorkin's Welcome to Eltingville. He further extended his contributions as a writer for Space Ghost: Coast to Coast and made a cameo in the 2003 episode "Baffler Meal."

In October 2004, he announced he would leave Cartoon Network to begin touring and focus on his music full-time.

He returned to Adult Swim in 2010 as a red Gummi bear named Gummi in Cheyenne Cinnamon and the Fantabulous Unicorn of Sugar Town Candy Fudge and, in 2013, began working on the mc chris cartoon, crowdfunding part of the pilot's production. A short pitch animation was made available online, but a full pilot was never completed.

Ward continued to focus on music, contributing theme songs for several of the SModcast Internet Radio (S.I.R.) programs, including those for the original SModcast, Blow Hard, Bagged & Boarded, and Jay & Silent Bob Get Old.

In 2018, Ward announced that the mc chris cartoon had resumed production. The project was ultimately shelved due to a combination of industry challenges, including the 2021 Hollywood strikes, disruptions in streaming services, and a downturn in the streaming industry.

Ward would reprise his role as MC Pee Pants again in 2022, in Adult Swim's Aqua Teen Hunger Force: Aquadonk Side Pieces web series. Also in 2022, Ward embarked on a tour titled "The Last Tour", which was advertised as his farewell tour. In 2024, he embarked on the "I Thought The Last Tour Was The Last Tour" Tour, and the year after, announced the "20 Years of Touring" Tour, which is set to begin on June 13.

In 2025, Ward began releasing a weekly podcast, None of This Matters, with fellow Aqua Teen Hunger Force actor Dana Snyder.

=== Music ===
Ward originally performed with The Lee Majors. While he is one of the artists most closely associated with the genre of nerdcore, he had been hesitant to accept the nerdcore label and described his music as "a genre in and of itself". as well as expressing concern over limiting himself to such a narrow audience and subject matter. He has appeared in news stories dealing with nerd culture and nerdcore. Of his nerdcore background, he said, "It's nice that a lot of folks consider me part of it. It's actually embarrassing how I used to think I was the only one playing with Star Wars toys and making music, and it just wasn't true. I have absolutely no problem with the label now." Although he has collaborated with various labels in the past, including Good Charlotte's DC Flag, MC Chris primarily self-releases his music independently.

== Discography ==
=== Studio albums ===
- Life's a Bitch and I'm Her Pimp (2001)
- Knowing Is Half the Hassle (2003)
- Eating's Not Cheating (2004)
- Dungeon Master of Ceremonies (2006)
- MC Chris Is Dead (2008)
- MC Chris Goes To Hell (2010)
- Race Wars (2011)
- Foreverrr (2014)
- MC Chris Is Dreaming (2016)
- #mcchrisisgoodmusic (2018)
- King in Black (2026)

=== Children's albums ===
- Marshmellow Playground (2011)
- Marshmellow Campground (2017)

=== Compilation albums ===
- The New York University 8-Track Discography 10th Anniversary Edition (2007)
- Apple Tummy (2009)
- Apple Lung (2012)
- Apple Bum (2017)
- Apple Eye (2022)

=== Extended plays ===
- Part Six Part One (2009)
- Part Six Part Two (2009)
- Part Six Part Three (2009)
- Friends (2012)
- Kickstape (2013)
- Foes (2017)

== Filmography ==
=== Film ===
| Year | Title | Role | Notes |
|---|---|---|---|
| 2007 | Aqua Teen Hunger Force Colon Movie Film for Theaters | MC Pee Pants | |
| 2008 | Nerdcore for Life | Himself | |

=== Television ===
| Year | Title | Role | Notes |
|---|---|---|---|
| 2000–2005 | Sealab 2021 | Hesh Hepplewhite / Various / Yes Brains | 19 episodes |
| 2002 | Welcome to Eltingville | Ward Willoughby / Wilson | Credited as Chistopher Ward |
| 2002 | The Brak Show | Record Store Worker | 2 episodes |
| 2002–2015 | Aqua Teen Hunger Force | MC Pee Pants / Little Brittle / Sir Loin / Young Carl | 6 episodes |
| 2003 | Space Ghost Coast to Coast | Dancing Man | Episode: "Baffler Meal" |
| 2007 | Fat Guy Stuck in Internet | Gordon | 2 episodes |
| 2010 | Cheyenne Cinnamon and the Fantabulous Unicorn of Sugar Town Candy Fudge | Gummi | |
| 2011 | Your Pretty Face Is Going to Hell | | Episode: Pilot |
| 2011 | The Chris Gethard Show | Musical Guest / Panel | Episode: The Human Crane Episode |
