= Dual Core (hip-hop duo) =

Nerdcore hip-hop duo

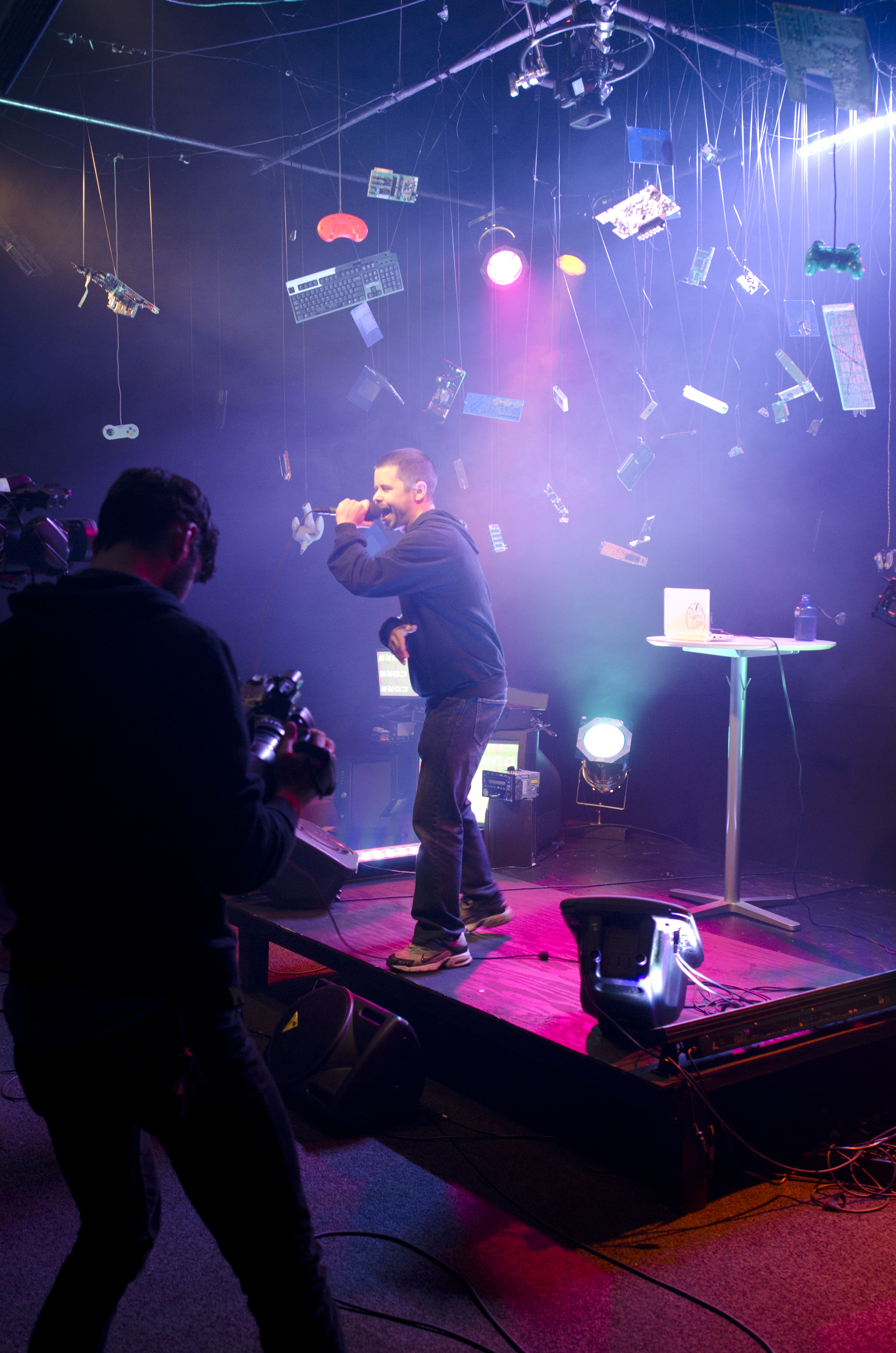
- Martinjak of Dual Core performing at the Electronic Frontier Foundation's 21st birthday party. 2011. Photo by Tim Wayne.

Background information
- Origin: Cincinnati, United States & Manchester, United Kingdom
- Genres: Hip hop, Nerdcore
- Years active: 2007–present
- Members: int eighty; c64
- Website: dualcoremusic.com

Dual Core is a hip hop duo composed of American rapper int eighty (David Martinjak) and British producer c64 (Chris Hunger). Their music is often categorised as nerdcore (a subgenre of hip hop music).

== History ==
Martinjak, from Cincinnati, met Hunger, from Manchester, in 2003 on an online music forum. They collaborate via the internet to produce their music. Hunger produces beats and sends the files to Martinjak, who records his vocals and uploads them to a server, Hunger downloads these files and uses them to mix the tracks. Dual Core are unusual for a nerdcore act in that it is composed of a rapper and a producer; most nerdcore rappers also produce their own beats. Martinjak and Hunger did not physically meet until after 2007. The song "All the Things" appears in 2016 video game Watch Dogs 2.

== Band members ==
- int eighty (sometimes "int80") — David Martinjak
- c64 — Chris Hunger

int eighty's stage name is based on an x86 assembly instruction ("technically 'int 0x80.'") while c64 refers to both the Commodore 64 computer and a combination of his first initial and his height (6 ft 4 in).

== Discography ==
- Zero One (2007) - album
- Super Powers (2007) - compilation album
- Lost Reality (2008) - album
- Next Level (2009) - album
- All The Things (2012) - album
- Downtime (2017) - album
