= Nerdcore =

Genre of hip-hop music

- Other names: Nerdcore hip hop; geek rap; nerd rap
- Stylistic origins: Underground hip-hop; alternative hip-hop; nerd culture; hip-hop; experimental hip hop
- Cultural origins: Early 2000s, United States

Subgenres
- Brazilian rap geek; Geeksta rap

Other topics
- Nintendocore; kawaii future bass; chiptune; geek rock

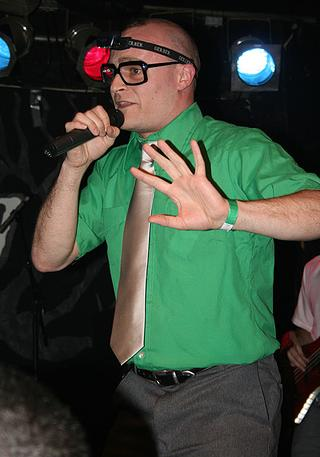
MC Frontalot, considered the "Godfather of Nerdcore", performing in April 2007

Nerdcore is a genre of hip-hop and nerd music characterized by subject matter considered of interest to nerds and geeks. Self-described nerdcore rapper MC Frontalot has the earliest known recorded use of the term (to describe this genre) in the 2000 song "Nerdcore Hiphop". As a niche genre similar to punk rock, nerdcore generally holds to the DIY ethic, and has a history of self-publishing and self-production.

Though nerdcore rappers can rap about anything from politics to science fiction, there are some favorites in nerdcore subject matter such as anime, movies, role-playing games, science, fantasy, computers and video games.

== Sound ==
Being more defined by lyrics, nerdcore has no unifying musical sound, and the sound of nerdcore varies wildly from artist to artist. One common theme, especially in the early days of the genre, is uncleared sampling. MC Frontalot addressed this directly in his 1999 song "Good Old Clyde", a thank you of sorts to Clyde Stubblefield for the "funky drummer" break – which was sampled to provide the song's beat. Sources for samples in nerdcore range from Vanilla Ice to Wolfgang Amadeus Mozart ("Rondo Alla Turca", in MC Plus+'s "Computer Science for Life"). YTCracker's Nerdrap Entertainment System is an entire album made up primarily of samples from 8-bit Nintendo games. Another notable artist, Random, created an album dedicated to the Mega Man video games in 2007 titled MegaRan. Though some artists have moved away from this—Frontalot, for example, completely remixed several songs to remove uncleared samples before releasing them commercially on his 2005 album Nerdcore Rising—it is still quite common, as most nerdcore tracks are released non-commercially and thus attract little to no attention from the RIAA.

Several DJs have provided beats and done remixes for multiple nerdcore artists, most notably Baddd Spellah, who currently mixes the majority of Frontalot's tracks. Spellah also won a remix competition in 2004.

== History ==
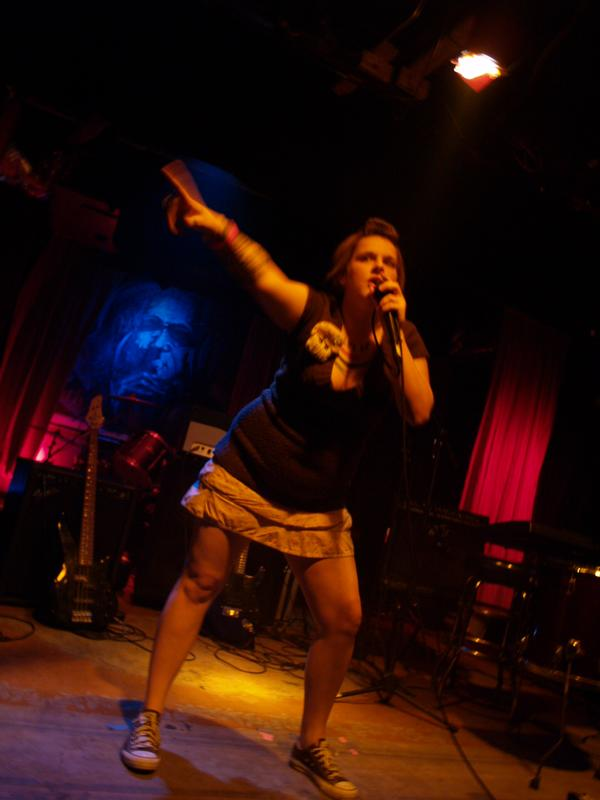
MC Router performing in June 2007

The term "nerdcore hip hop" was first recorded in 2000 by MC Frontalot. However, long before its formal naming, artists like the Beastie Boys, Kool Keith, Deltron 3030, MC 900 Ft. Jesus, MC Paul Barman, DJ Jazzy Jeff & the Fresh Prince, Company Flow, and MF Doom explored unconventional hip-hop topics such as science fiction, pop culture and space. While these artists were not directly part of the nerdcore movement, their work influenced its development. For example, the Beastie Boys’ sci-fi-themed 1998 album Hello Nasty featured tracks like "Intergalactic" and "Unite," which predated the popularization of nerdcore. Similarly, Blackalicious created science-oriented compositions like "Chemical Calisthenics," and MF Doom drew heavy inspiration from comic book supervillains. Despite these thematic overlaps, they are generally seen as part of conventional hip-hop rather than nerdcore, largely because they did not self-identify as nerd artists.

Conversely, nerdcore artists do not always concentrate solely on stereotypically "nerdy" topics. For instance, MC Frontalot's songs often explore broader themes. The key distinction between nerdcore and other genres lies in self-identification: while groups like Blackalicious do not label themselves as "nerds," Frontalot and other nerdcore artists embrace that identity.

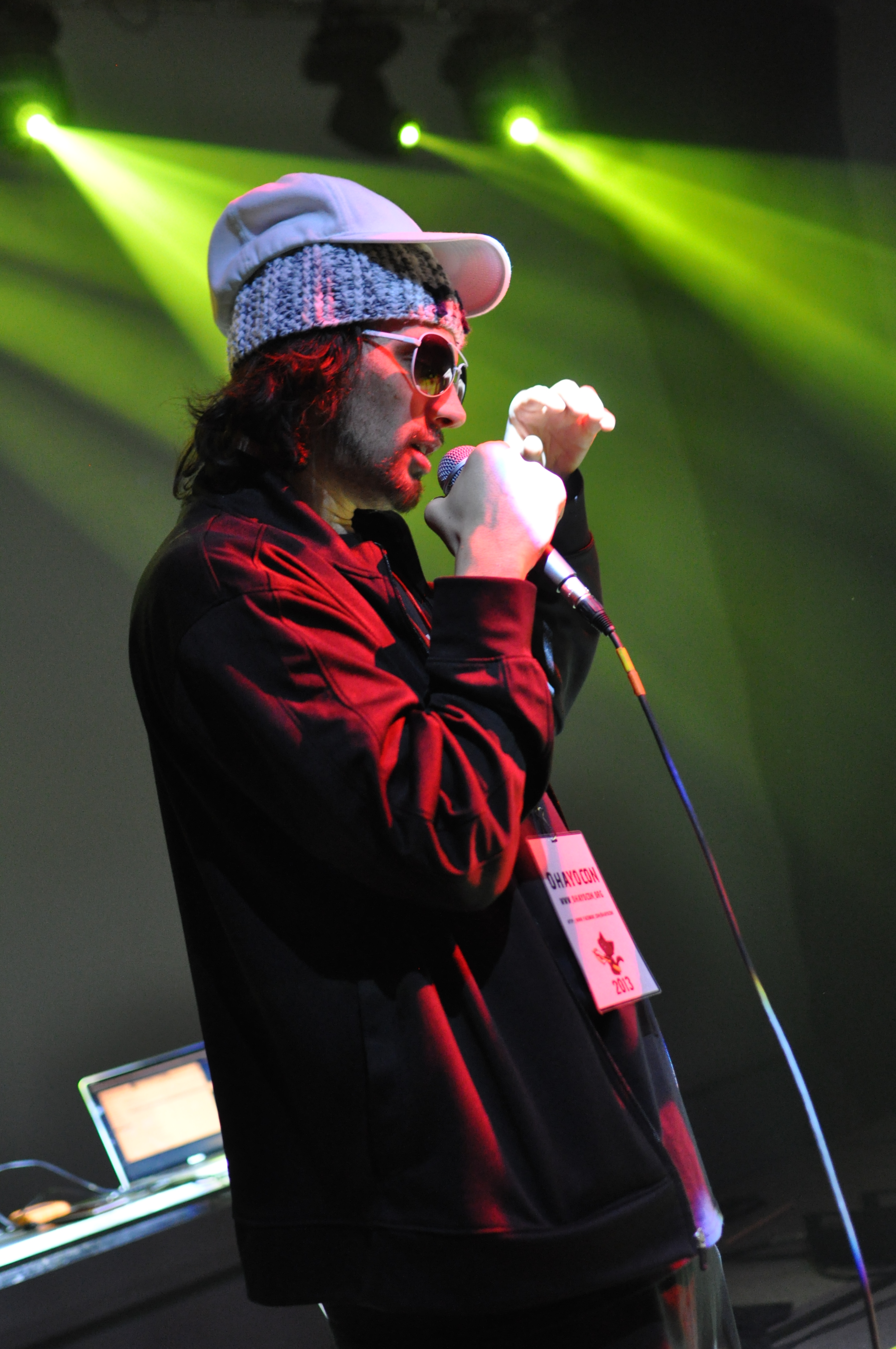
YTCracker performing in January 2013

Nerdcore was influenced by other "geek" genres, such as filk and geek rock. Artists like They Might Be Giants and "Weird Al" Yankovic (with tracks like "I Can't Watch This," "It's All About the Pentiums," "White & Nerdy," and "Foil") helped lay the groundwork for nerdcore’s rise by combining humor, fandom, and niche cultural references.

The genre gained significant traction in 2004 when the webcomic Penny Arcade held its first convention, the Penny Arcade Expo (PAX), in Bellevue, Washington. Alongside gaming-focused content, geek-friendly musicians, including MC Frontalot and Optimus Rhyme, performed at the event. The following year’s expo featured full concerts with nerdy hip-hop acts, further solidifying the "nerdcore" label and growing its fan base. Many fans eventually became artists themselves, expanding the genre.

In 2005, a subgenre called geeksta rap emerged, drawing inspiration from gangsta rap but focusing on technical expertise and skills, such as computer programming. This braggadocious style led to nerdcore's first major feud, between MC Plus+ and Monzy.

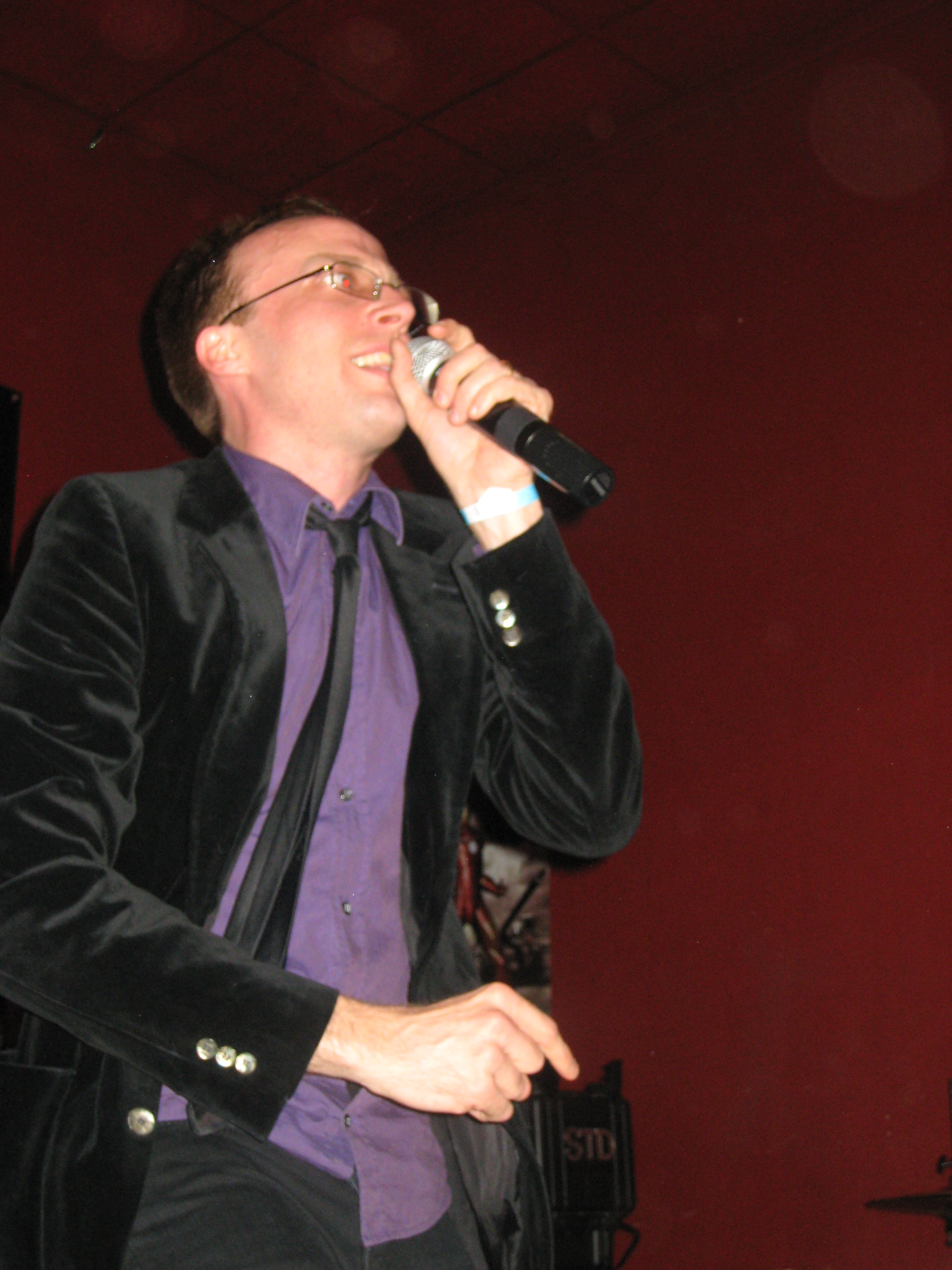
Schäffer the Darklord performing at Nerdapalooza in July 2008

In 2006, Jason Z. Christie (aka High-C) launched the first websites dedicated solely to nerdcore, NerdcoreHipHop.org and RhymeTorrents.com. These platforms became hubs for the community and distributed the "Rhyme Torrents Compilation," the first nerdcore-focused CD series. This brought mainstream media attention to the genre, including coverage in Wired.

MC Lars also contributed to nerdcore’s rise in 2006 with his single "Download This Song," which criticized the music industry’s stance on digital downloads. The track charted at #29 on the ARIA Chart and highlighted the genre’s strong ties to digital culture.

From 2008 to 2013, Orlando, Florida hosted Nerdapalooza, an annual charity festival bringing together nerdcore acts and other "nerd music" genres. In 2009, Amsterdam hosted "Glitched: The Dutch Nerdcore Event," featuring European premieres and performances by MC Lars, YTCracker, Beefy, and MC Router.

By the late 2010s and early 2020s, Nerdcore expanded on platforms like YouTube, giving rise to subgenres like Otacore (focused on anime-themed rap) and Hackcore, which explores hacking and tech culture.

== Film ==
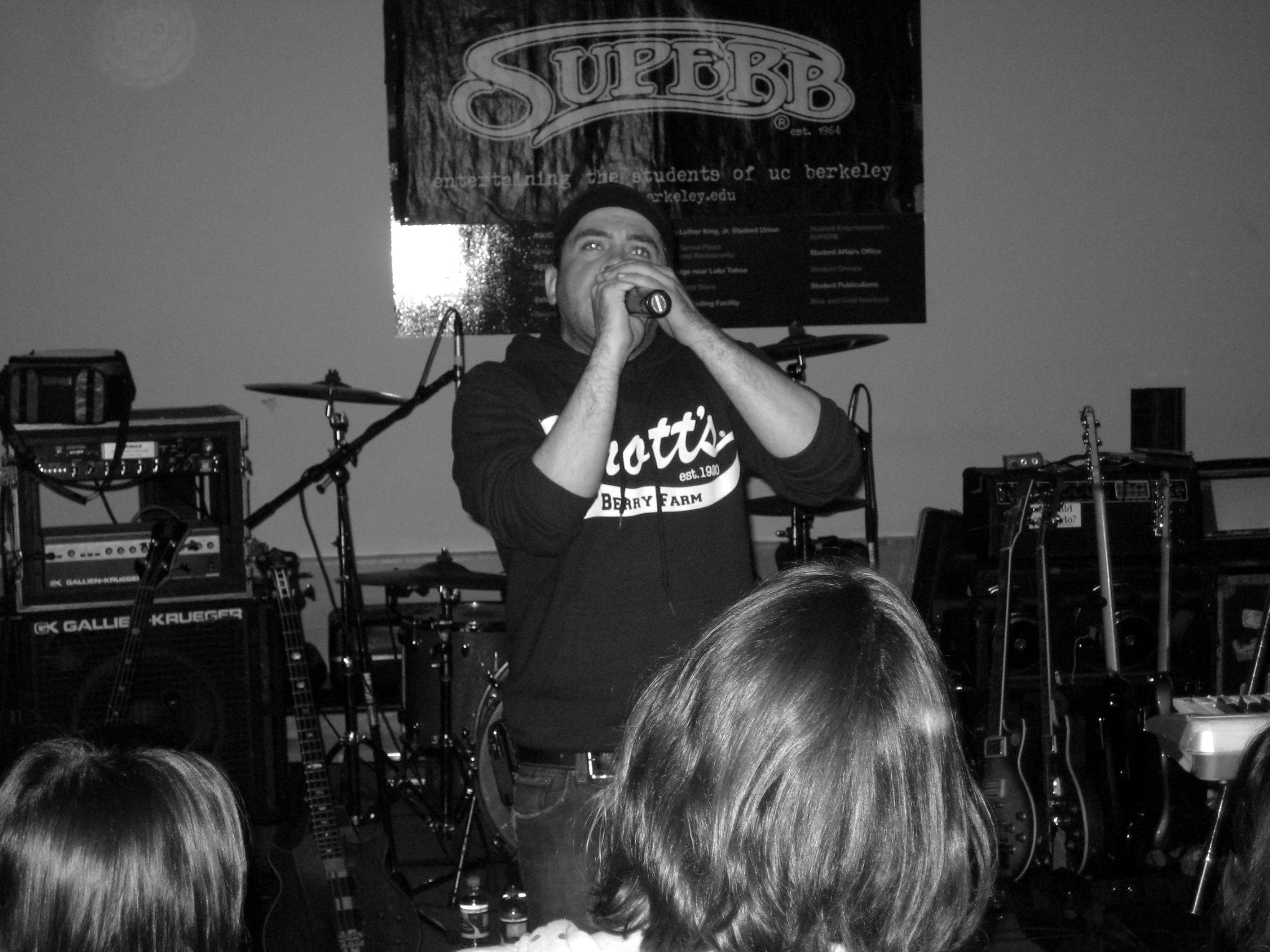
MC Chris performing in February 2008

Two feature-length documentaries about the world of nerdcore were released in early 2008: Nerdcore Rising and Nerdcore For Life. While both films aimed to document the rise of nerdcore, they faced criticism for not fully addressing the genre's complexity and controversies. Nerdcore Rising premiered at the SXSW Film Conference and Festival on March 9, 2008, while Nerdcore For Life debuted at the tenth annual Wisconsin Film Festival on April 5, 2008.

Nerdcore Rising, directed by New York filmmakers Negin Farsad and Kimmy Gatewood, focuses on nerdcore pioneer MC Frontalot and his first US tour in 2006. The film was noted for centering primarily on Frontalot’s journey, leaving broader aspects of the genre underexplored.

Nerdcore For Life, directed by Chicago filmmaker Dan Lamoureux, examines the genre through appearances by over three dozen notable performers. Critics pointed to challenges in capturing the genre’s diverse perspectives and addressing key cultural issues within the nerdcore

Commonly associated with Adult Swim (see above). MC Chris was able to further expand the subculture of Nerdcore and grow its community.

Notably, MC Chris helped bring Nerdcore, to a wider audience through his inclusion in the Adult Swim programming block. His songs, such as Fett’s Vette, Hoodie Ninja, and I Want Candy (Remix), gained acclaim through their use in Adult Swim promos. Additionally, MC Chris contributed voice acting and writing to several Adult Swim shows, including Aqua Teen Hunger Force, where his character, MC Pee Pants, became a fan-favorite. Through these contributions, MC Chris played a significant role in expanding Nerdcore beyond music and into other forms of media.

== Controversies ==
Nerdcore, as a genre, has faced intense and polarizing controversies, with its connection to hip-hop's cultural foundations sparking fierce debate. Central to the conflict is the accusation that nerdcore distances itself from hip-hop's sociocultural roots, which are inextricably tied to African-American culture. Critics have argued that the genre, historically dominated by white artists, risks veering into cultural appropriation, effectively erasing the contributions and struggles of Black communities that birthed hip-hop.

Tensions around race in nerdcore came to the surface in 2010, sparking online discussions about the genre’s relationship to hip-hop’s roots. Some critics raised concerns about the increasing presence of white artists and audiences, questioning whether this shift reflected a lack of awareness or respect for the culture’s Black origins. The conversation prompted many in the nerdcore community to reflect on representation, influence, and the responsibilities that come with engaging in a historically Black art form.

Another layer of controversy within the nerdcore community centers on the personal behavior of some of its stars. Notably, MC Chris faced backlash in 2012 when he had a fan ejected from a show over a critical tweet.

Additionally, in 2016, Alex Trebek faced backlash after calling the creators of a contestant's favorite music genre, nerdcore hip-hop, "losers" during a Jeopardy! episode. The contestant, Susan Cole, had shared her love for nerdcore, appreciating how it focuses on video games, science fiction, and other niche interests. Trebek’s comment, meant as a joke, sparked outrage on social media. Despite the controversy, Cole won $22,600 and returned for another episode. The incident would later resurface on social media during the COVID-19 lockdown, leading fans to revisit the moment.

== See also ==
- Alternative hip-hop
- Chap hop
