= YTCracker =

Hip-hop musician

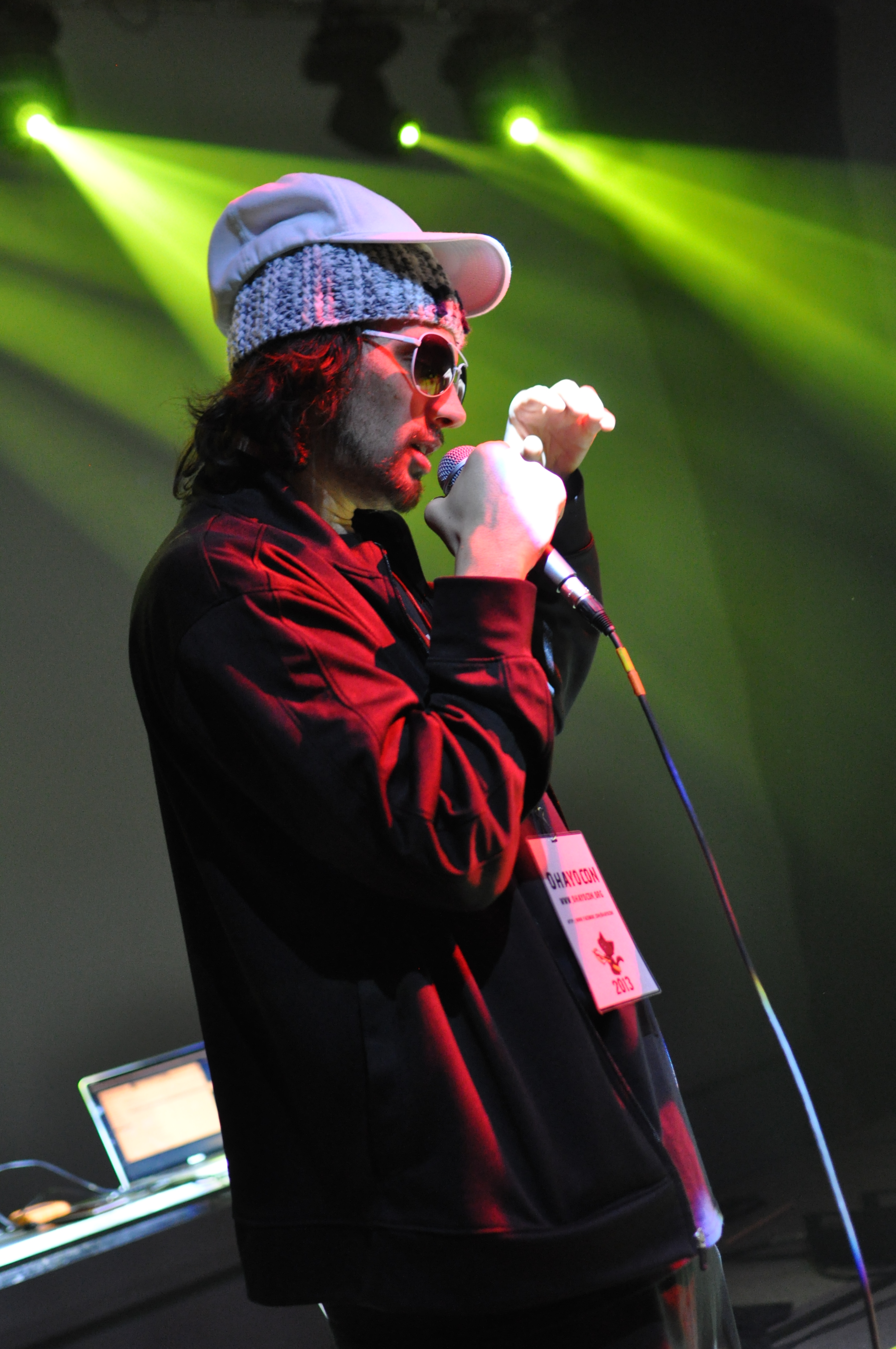
- YTCracker in 2012

Background information
- Also known as: YTCracker
- Born: Bryce Case Jr. August 23, 1982 (age 44)
- Origin: La Mirada, California, U.S.
- Genre: Nerdcore
- Occupation: Rapper
- Years active: 1997–present
- Labels: Colorado Beach, Nerdy South Records
- Member of: Sinister Six, 8-Bit Boys, Spamtec Crew

Bryce Case Jr. (born August 23, 1982), otherwise known as YTCracker (pronounced "whitey cracker"), is an American rapper from La Mirada, California. His stage name derives from having formerly been a black hat hacker. Case is best known for his contributions to the hacking community along with nerdcore hip hop subculture.

During his criminal career, he became known for defacing the webpages of several federal and municipal government websites in the United States, as well as several in the private industry at the age of 17.

== Biography ==
=== Childhood ===
Case was born in La Mirada, California, United States.

He has stated in interviews that he was exposed to computers by his father and mother, learning to program BASIC from age 4. From there, his father taught him how to navigate MSDOS and System V. Before long, he was involved in the local bulletin board systems and learning various other programming languages by reading books and examples.

Case attended William J. Palmer High School in Colorado Springs, dropping out of high school at the age of 17 to focus on a career in the information technology field. According to an interview, his stage name is a combination of Yours Truly, a Kourier (delivery person) from the Neal Stephenson cyberpunk novel Snow Crash, and the hacker term Cracker, meaning someone who breaks into computer systems.

=== Hacking activities ===
In the late 1990s and early 2000s, YTCracker gained a following in the hacking world due to his programs he had written, exploits in the AOL World and hacking and defacing websites. He was most known for gaining access and creating exploits on INT and OH Internal Admin accounts.

In 1999, Case gained notoriety, media coverage, and a restitution bill for defacing the web site of NASA’s Goddard Space Flight Center with a modified frontend for a commonly used msadc.pl exploit. Other United States government websites that were hacked include the Bureau of Land Management's national training center and the Defense Contract Audit Agency. At least 40 other websites were tampered with by Case, including Airspace USA, the bank Altamira, Nissan Motors, Honda, the monitoring station for the United States Geological Survey and the Texas Department of Public Safety. Case stated he believed he was "on the good side" as he broke into company websites to alert them of security problems, not to cause harm. In May 2000 Case was charged with criminal mischief and computer crime for breaking into the Colorado Springs city website, causing an estimated $25,000 in damages, though all $25,000 are costs of "time lost" to users.

These defacements launched him into the spotlight, making him a resource for the media, commenting on other hacking-related events, such as the denial of service attacks on Yahoo, eBay, Gay.com, and other well-known websites in 2000.

In 2005, Case founded a hacker collective called Digital Gangster, which was at its core an internet forum. Some of its members reportedly claimed responsibility for many high-profile hacks of the 2000s and 2010s, including the Paris Hilton T-Mobile breach in 2005, the Miley Cyrus hacked email scandal of 2008, the Twitter hack of Barack Obama and others in 2009, and the DNS hijacking of Craigslist in 2014.

Case is also a self-identified member of the hacker group Anonymous, and was an associate of LulzSec, writing the official theme song of Operation AntiSec, featured in the 2014 documentary The Hacker Wars.

== Music ==
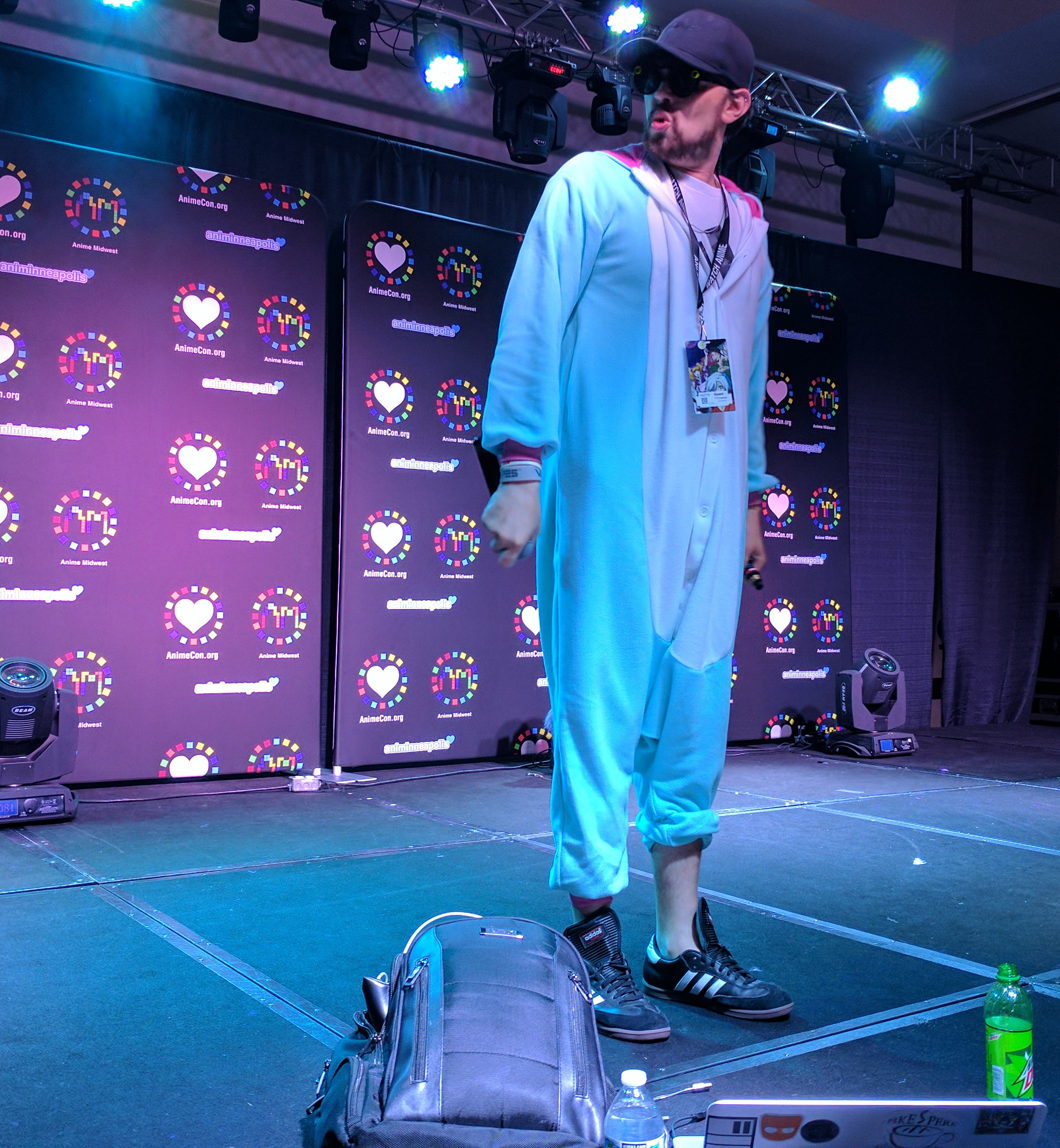
YTCracker performing at AniMinneapolis in 2017.

Case performs as an MC and a DJ under the name YTCracker. He is best known for his work in the genre of Nerdcore hip-hop, in 2005 producing the album NerdRap Entertainment System. The album was created by adding vocals to re-mixed digital music from original Nintendo games, and was described in Newsweek as a "classic of the style."

In Las Vegas, Case performed in 2006 at the Consumer Electronics Show, and in has regularly performed at the Players Ball, appearing with mainstream rappers such as Snoop Dogg, Xzibit, Ice Cube, and Too Short. He has also performed at several DEF CON events.

In 2010, an untitled demo by British electronic rock band Proxies was leaked onto the internet containing a feature by Case.

Case runs an independent record label, Nerdy South Records.

On January 3, 2023, Case released a collaborative single with the electronic musician deadmau5; "Antisec", released under mau5trap, and has been featured in several major Deadmau5 tours.

== Discography ==
- categoryFive (1999) (solo effort)
- spryngz thuggin' (2000) (solo effort)
- AOL Rules (2001) (solo effort)
- spam 2k2 (2002) (solo effort)
- stc is the greatest (2004) (as a member of spamtec)
- Nerdrap Entertainment System (2005) (solo effort)
- still the greatest (2006) (as a member of spamtec)
- Rhyme Torrents Volumes I & II (2006) (compilation)
- Nerd Life (2006) (solo effort)
- Dirty Nerdy (2007) (featuring many other nerdcore artists)
- 8-Bit Diagrams (2008) (as a member of 8-Bit Boys)
- Serious Business EP (2008) (featuring Elijah Lucian)
- The Digital Gangster LP (2008) (with MC Lars)
- Invasion of the Mic Snatchers (2008) (As part of the Sinister Six)
- dcpd bangerz vol. 1 (2009) (featuring the Dekalb County, Georgia Police Force)
- Chrono Nurga vol. 1 (2009) (solo effort)
- ______ every day (2010) (with Hairetsu and spamtec)
- Space Mission (2010) (featuring Elijah Lucian, Hairetsu)
- Who Live Like This EP (2012) (featuring Hairetsu)
- EarthBound: adventures of the sound stone vol. 1 (2012) (solo effort)
- Bitcoin Baron (2013) (solo effort)
- Introducing Neals (2014) (solo effort)
- Strictly for My Streamers (2017) (solo effort)
- A Side Quest for Fractional Cents (2022) (solo effort)
- Antisec (2023) (collaboration with deadmau5)
- Advertising Neals (2024) (solo effort)
- i invented the computer (2025) (solo effort)
