= MAGFest =

American annual video game festival

- Status: Active
- Genre: Video games, video game music, chiptune, nerd music
- Venue: Gaylord National Convention Center
- Locations: National Harbor, Maryland Other occurrence: MAGLabs: Baltimore, Maryland; MAGWest: San Jose, California
- Country: United States
- Inaugurated: September 27–29, 2002 Other events: MAGLabs: September 12–14, 2014; MAGWest: August 25–28, 2017
- Most recent: January 8–11, 2026 Other events: MAGLabs: March 21, 2026; MAGWest: August 14–16, 2026
- Next event: Jan 7–10, 2027 Other events: MAGLabs: September 12, 2026; MAGWest: TBA 2027
- Attendance: 24,500 in 2025
- Organizer: MAGFest Inc., 501(c)(3) non-profit organization
- Website: https://magfest.org

MAGFest (Music and Gaming Festival, originally the Mid-Atlantic Gaming Festival) is a non-profit organization and video game, art, music, and culture festival. They hold multiple events throughout the year, with their flagship event being an annual festival held in the Washington metropolitan area or the National Harbor. The events feature concerts by chiptune artists and video game cover bands, educational panels and activities, free-to-play arcade cabinets, a bring your own computer (BYOC) LAN party, community jam spaces, and charity speedruns & auctions.

In addition to the primary "Super MAGFest" circuit, MAGWest is held annually in California and the smaller MAGLabs is held biannually in Baltimore, Maryland. All events are primarily run by a large volunteer base, supported and organized by a small, paid office staff.

== Attractions ==
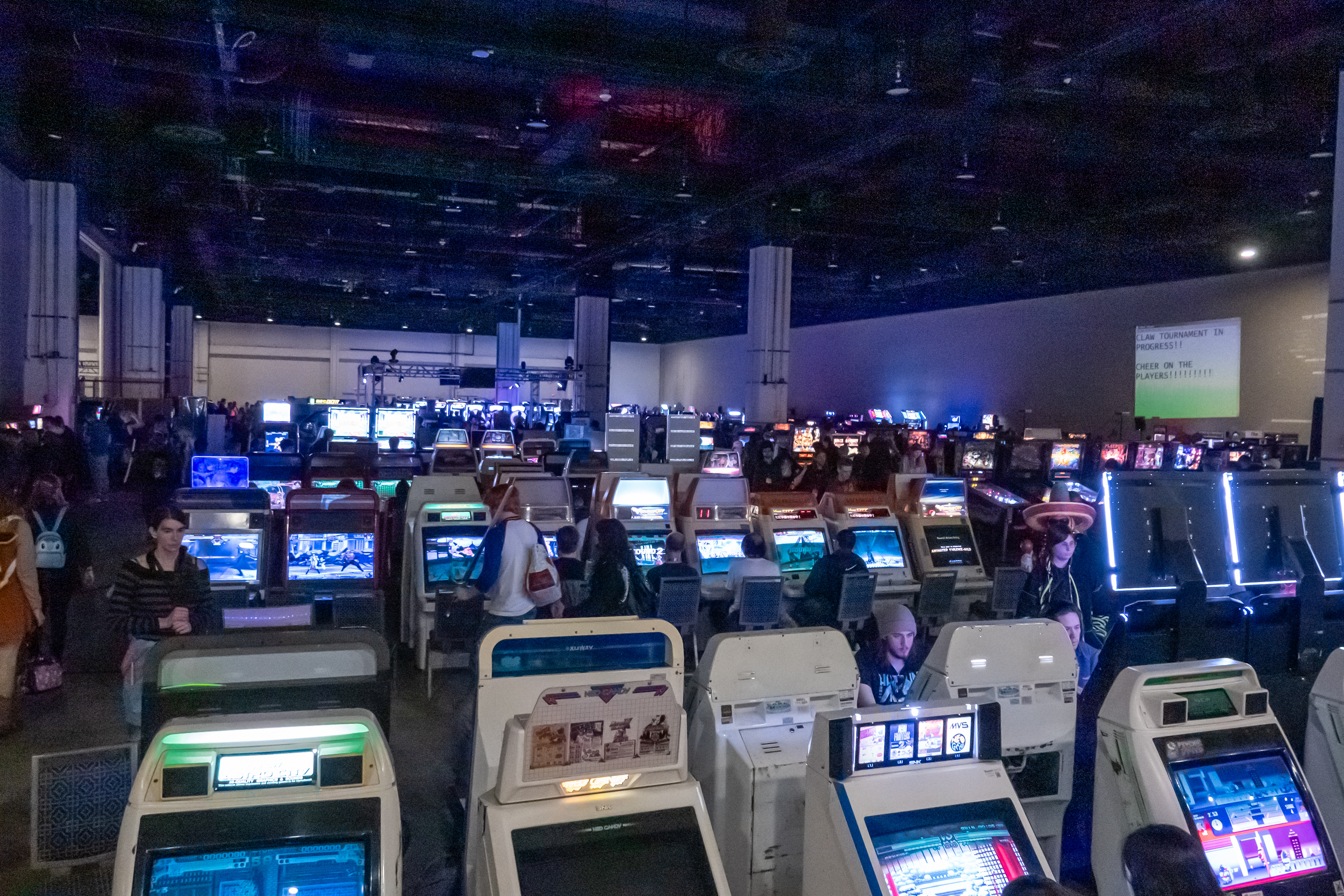
The arcade hall at Super MAGFest 2025

MAGFest's arcade hall is open 24 hours a day. The exhibition hall contains hundreds of full-size arcade cabinets, and even pinball machines that are donated for the event from local collectors and vending companies. All arcades are set to play for free on admission price, and are monitored 24 hours a day by maintenance and technical staff. The arcade hall includes specialty lighting, laser lighting, and music to invoke the feeling of a traditional arcade. The game selection ranges from 1970's vintage black and white games, vector monitors games, Cathode Ray Tube games, modern/Indie arcades; as well as contemporary Japanese candy cabinets and Japanese dance/music games like Dance Dance Revolution and Taiko No Tatsujin. Arcades range from various manufacturers like Atari, Nintendo, Taito, Midway, Williams, Capcom, Sega, ICE, Rock Ola, and Exidy. Games that challenge various abilities include driving simulators, shooting simulators, labyrinth games, and others. There are multiple events and tournaments that occur during the event that allow you to challenge dozens of others for prizes. They also host a ten-game tournament that spans the entire event which allows players to openly compete on 10 classic arcade games to work on getting the highest scores possible, with the ultimate prize being given to the player who scores the most points total on all games.

There is also a console hall open 24 hours a day that houses over a hundred televisions and attached game consoles, where guests are invited to play at will and each station's game is periodically swapped with a different one from a game library. Attendees are encouraged to bring their own controllers or fighting game pads to compete with. Consoles range from vintage Atari 2600, Intellivision style games all the way through the years to the most current and up to date Xbox, PlayStation, and Nintendo systems and games. Even Steam titles are playable, and indie game developers have been known to introduce or beta test new games at the events. Tournaments are performed frequently throughout the event on several platforms and game types for prizes.

In 2013 the MAGFest Indie Videogame Showcase, "MIVS" was started. It features between 40 and 60 booths of indie game developers each year. Since 2016 there has been an "Indie Arcade" section, housing new arcade games created by indie developers and artists from around the world. The bulk of these cabinets are curated through Death By Audio Arcade in NY. In 2017 the "Indie Homebrew" sub-section was started, which has featured new indie games that can be played on classic consoles from the 1980s and 1990s such as the Atari 2600 and Nintendo Entertainment System.

The concert areas host nightly performances in multiple rooms simultaneously, as well as a jam space where musicians may gather to play music together casually. Common music genres include chiptune, and video game music. Many luminaries of video game music fan culture have performed at MAGFest. Previous bands include Machinae Supremacy, Earthbound Papas, Minibosses, Powerglove, the NESkimos, the Advantage, and Chromelodeon.

Other major attractions include guest panels from the video game industry such as Sid Meier, Jon St. John and Nobuo Uematsu. In addition, the fan remixing community is well-represented with sites such as OverClocked ReMix. Filmmakers such as X-Strike Studios, Main Moon Productions, PBC Productions, and There Will Be Brawl have also appeared at the event. MAGFest has also included academic panels such as "Game Studies 101", where attendees were given a basic introduction to the manner in which scholars study video games. In 2024, a "Folkwise" panel including employees from the US Library of Congress discussed video game culture.

Additionally, MAGFest features DJ battles, an open mic stage, a large LAN party environment, a film screening room, a tabletop gaming room, vendors, contests like "name-that-tune," and a video game "challenge booth" where players can "try to tackle insanely difficult gaming feats for prizes of all sorts."

== History ==
=== Origins in Virginia (2002–2011) ===
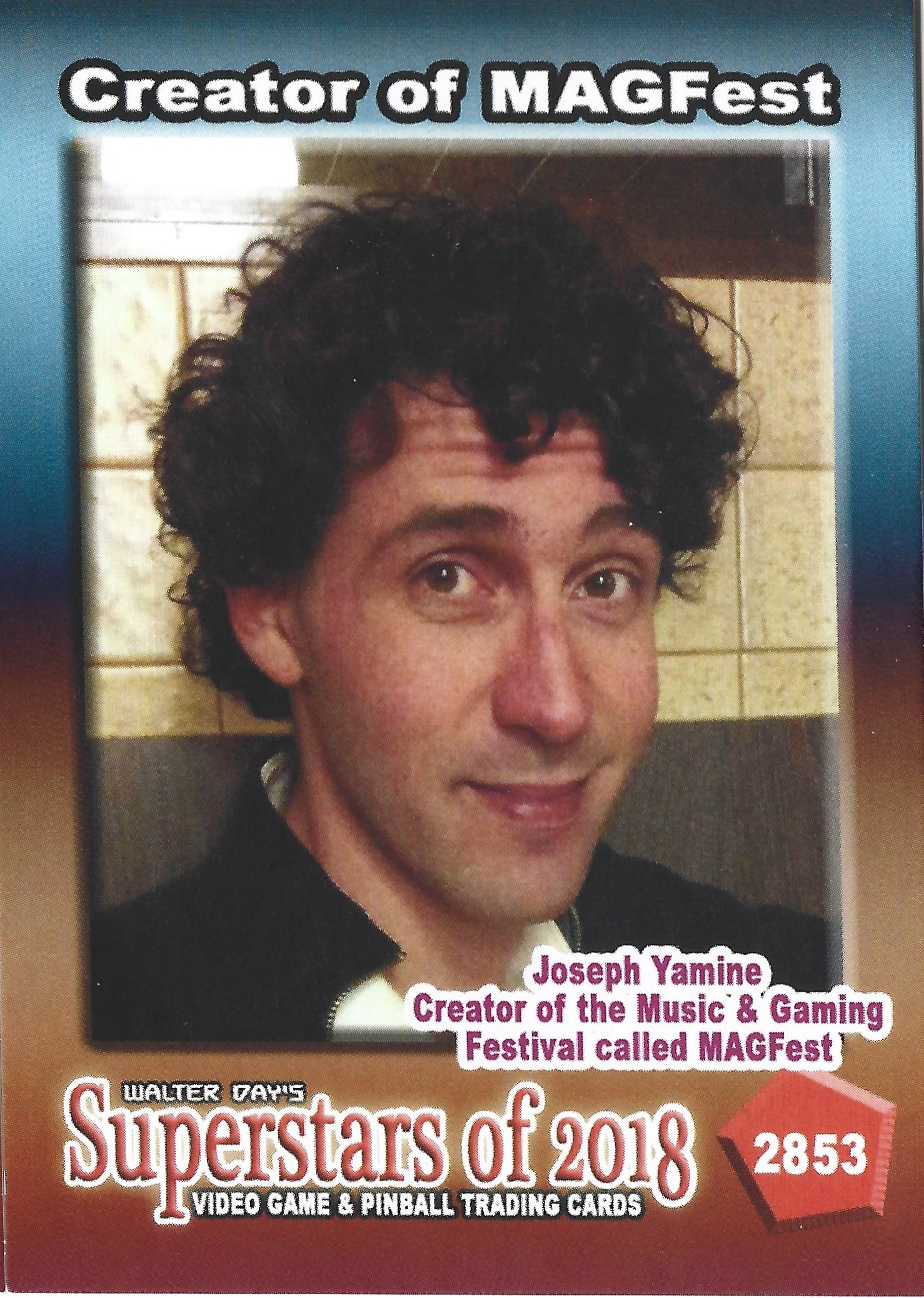
Yamine inducted into The Walter Day Collection in 2018 for the creation of MAGFest.

MAGFest was created by Joseph "Joe" Yamine and Sean Rider in 2002, as a small event in Roanoke, Virginia. Nick Marinelli, director of press and public relations, stated in an interview that Yamine "wanted people to just come together, play games, and rock out to some great video game cover bands". The original event featured three bands, an arcade room, a dealers room, a video room devoted to anime, a dance party area, and auctions of rare video games and art.

Brendan Becker took over from Yamine at the following event, and the number of attendees grew from 250 to 3,000 over the course of eight years. Marinelli credited word of mouth for the slow but continued growth of the event, adding "It's not about seeing something no one's ever seen more; it's about getting together and celebrating what you love". Charles Margolis donated an X-Men arcade cabinet to the event for MAGFest VI in 2008, and it was placed in a central area that year. The cabinet was extremely loud, particularly Colossus' special move, and it became an event tradition to mimic the roar in later years. After Margolis passed from brain cancer in 2017, a memorial notice was added to the cabinet. The event was extended in length from MAGFest 8 in 2010, going from a three-day to a four-day schedule. MAGFest 8 was initially billed as the host of a charity speedrunning drive by Mike Uyama and Andrew Schroeder, but internet connectivity issues at the hotel caused the event to be spun off as independently at another venue as Games Done Quick (GDQ). GDQ has since become a recurring event circuit in its own right.

=== New venues and expansion (2012–2020) ===
In 2012, MAGFest moved to the Gaylord National Harbor Resort & Convention Center, and MAGFest Inc was created as a nonprofit organization to manage the event. Beginning in 2014, some additional annual conventions began to be held, starting with MAGLabs at the former venue in Virginia, and MAGWest held in California each year. Attendance at the main event reached 20,000 by 2016, and peaked at 24,000 at Super MAGFest 2020, held that January. From 2019 the primary event circuit became known as "Super MAGfest". MAGLabs went on hiatus from 2019.

=== COVID-19 pandemic and hiatus (2020–2021) ===
The COVID-19 pandemic negatively affected the event. Super MAGFest 2020 was conducted that January, shortly before social distancing restrictions were introduced, but MAGWest 2020 and 2021 could only be conducted as digital events. A September 2020 announcement cancelled the in-person Super MAGFest 2021, which had been due to take part the coming January. The announcement also indicated that the future of MAGfest in general was uncertain.

In addition to the financial challenge the pandemic represented, with the loss of 95% of the organization's revenue for the year, "interpersonal and cultural issues" within the senior management team led to instability. In November 2020, an organization named "friends of MAGFest" expressed concern about the MAGFest board of directors, alleging financial neglect, mismanagement and abuse by the Executive Director, Paul Birtel. After negotiations with Friends of MAGFest, Birtel fired three board members associated with the group, as well as the events director, Debra Lenik, which effectively cancelled the planned virtual event for 2021. Lenik considered the move a retaliatory action, and was told that she could only keep her health insurance if she signed an agreement not to sue the organization. The entire board resigned in January 2021, and Paul Birtel himself resigned 10 days later. Through the following three months the new board worked to stabilize the organization, with Lenik being rehired in her original role in April 2021. The organization announced some structural changes, including the presence of volunteer staff on the board, as well as the return of former staff members and volunteers.

=== Return (2022–present) ===
Super MAGFest 2022 was formally announced in August 2021, confirming a return to the in-person event schedule. The event was held successfully, though there was a significant decline in attendees compared to the 24,000 seen at the peak in January 2020. 10,581 people attended in 2022, rising to 18,987 in 2023. Super MAGFest 2024 was announced on May 31, 2023 and was the first event to sell out at the Gaylord National Harbor Convention Centre, with an attendance of around 30,000.

MAGLabs returned in 2025, now held at a new venue in Baltimore. The revived MAGLabs focuses on games related arts and crafts, such as tabletop miniatures and scenery. The relaunched MAGLabs was a smaller, one day event with free entry.

== Event history ==
=== Super MAGFest ===
Billed simply as MAGFest before 2019; the "Super" moniker may have been added to differentiate it from the other smaller scale event circuits. Attendance figures marked with an asterisk (*) were capped.

Title	Dates	Location	Attendance	Guests
Mid-Atlantic Gaming Festival	Sep 27–29, 2002	Holiday Inn Tanglewood; Roanoke, VA	265	Everyone, Minibosses, the OneUps
MAGFest 2.0	Oct 31–Nov 2, 2003	Clarion Hotel; Williamsburg, VA	375	The Smash Bros., Wave Theory, Minibosses
MAGFest M3	Oct 1–3, 2004	Clarion Hotel; Williamsburg, VA	500	Inheretics, Chromelodeon, the Jenova Project, the NESkimos, Temp Sound Solutions, Minibosses, the Smash Bros., Wave Theory
MAGFest M4	Jan 13–15, 2006	Doubletree Hilton; Charlottesville, VA	750	Parasprinter, Powerglove, Search Snake, This Place Is Haunted, Sprite Slowdown, Minibosses, the NESkimos, the Smash Bros., Wave Theory
MAGFest M5	Jan 4–7, 2007	Sheraton Premiere; Vienna, VA	950	Armcannon, Year 200X, Chromelodeon, Parasprinter, Powerglove, the Smash Bros., Temp Sound Solutions, This Place Is Haunted, Wave Theory
MAGFest VI	Jan 3–6, 2008	Hilton Alexandria Mark Center; Alexandria, VA	1050	The Advantage, Armcannon, Powerglove, Select Start, the Smash Bros., Temp Sound Solutions, This Place Is Haunted
MAGFest 7	Jan 1–4, 2009	Hilton Alexandria Mark Center; Alexandria, VA	1350	Armcannon, Armadillo Tank, Entertainment System, the Megas, Metroid Metal, A Rival, Rare Candy, Temp Sound Solutions, the Smash Bros., This Place Is Haunted, Year 200X
MAGFest 8	Jan 1–4, 2010	Hilton Alexandria Mark Center; Alexandria, VA	2200	Armcannon, Armadillo Tank, Entertainment System, the Megas, Metroid Metal, A Rival, Rare Candy, Select Start, Temp Sound Solutions, the OneUps, the Smash Bros., This Place Is Haunted, Brentalfloss
MAGFest 9	Jan 13–16, 2011	Hilton Alexandria Mark Center; Alexandria, VA	3000*	The Protomen, Minibosses, the OneUps, Metroid Metal, Armcannon, Bit Brigade, the Megas, Year 200X, X-Hunters, Entertainment System, This Place Is Haunted, Rare Candy, DJ Cutman, A Rival, Powerglove, Brentalfloss, Inverse Phase, Note!, Danimal Cannon, Zen Albatross, Dark Warriors, Noisewaves, George & Jonathan, Cheap Dinosaurs
MAGFest X	Jan 5–8, 2012	Gaylord National Convention Center; National Harbor, MD	6100	Earthbound Papas, Armcannon, Bit Brigade, Descendants of Erdrick, DJ Cutman, the Megas, Metroid Metal, the OneUps, Temp Sound Solutions, This Place Is Haunted, X-Hunters, Year 200X, Krieger, Random Encounter, Disasterpeace, Revengineers, Battlecake, Chipocrite, Knife City, Jake 'Virt' Kaufman, Inverse Phase, Animal Style, An0va, Zen Albatross, Dauragon, A Rival, DJ Cats
MAGFest 11	Jan 3–6, 2013	Gaylord National Convention Center; National Harbor, MD	9000	Yuzo Koshiro, Kinuyo Yamashita, Armcannon, Bit Brigade, Brentalfloss and the Cartridge Family, the Megas, Metroid Metal, the OneUps, Powerglove, the Protomen, Mega Ran, Rare Candy, Those Who Fight, Video Game Orchestra, Arc Impulse, Descendants of Erdrick, Dwelling of Duels Live, Fighting in the Streets, Knight of the Round, Lords of Thunder, My Parents Favorite Music, On Being Human, OverClocked University, Professor Shyguy, Super Guitar Bros, Triforce Quartet, the World Is Square, the X-Hunters, Bright Primate, Cheap Dinosaurs, Crashfaster, Danimal Cannon, D&D Sluggers, Inverse Phase, Kris Keyser, Jake 'Virt' Kaufman, Benjamin Briggs, bLiNd, DJ Cutman
MAGFest 12	Jan 2–5, 2014	Gaylord National Convention Center; National Harbor, MD	12,000	Machinae Supremacy, the OneUps, Love Canon, Bit Brigade, Urizen, X-Hunters, the Megas, Knight of the Round, Mega Ran, MegaDriver, Super Guitar Bros, Those Who Fight, On Being Human, This Place Is Haunted, Armcannon, Rare Candy, LonelyRollingStars, GameChops DJ Battle
MAGFest 13	Jan 23–26, 2015	Gaylord National Convention Center; National Harbor, MD	17,000	Yuu Miyake, Machinae Supremacy, Yoshihito Yano, the Protomen, Powerglove, Bit Brigade, LonelyRollingStars, the Megas, Mega Ran, Super Guitar Bros, Kirby's Dream Band, Viking Guitar Live, Super Soul Bros, Rare Candy, Urizen, On Being Human, the Tiberian Sons, Professor Shyguy, Triforce Quartet, Dethlehem, Double Ferrari, Do a Barrell Roll!, Sammus, Descendants of Erdrick, MissingNO, DJ Cutman, Grimecraft, Ben Briggs, Kevin Villecco, Sushi Killer, Jake 'Virt' Kaufman, Solarbear, Roboctopus, for Astronauts and Satellites, An0va feat. Rekchadam, Crashfaster, Marshall Art, Danimal Cannon, Trey Frey
MAGFest 2016	Feb 18–21, 2016	Gaylord National Convention Center; National Harbor, MD	20,000*	Ippo Yamada with Inti Creates Sound Team, Ninja Sex Party, TWRP, Psychostick, Bear McCreary, the OneUps, Super Soul Bros, I Fight Dragons, Rekcahdam, Trev Wignall, Coda, FamilyJules7x, Ap0c, Sammus, Llittle Paw, Eight Bit Disaster, James Landino, bLiNd, 2ToneDisco, Mykah, the World Is Square, Metroid Metal, You Bred Raptors?, the Living Tombstone, Note!, Shirobon, Chipzel, Kubbi, Random Beats Showcase, DiscoCactus
MAGFest 2017	Jan 5–8, 2017	Gaylord National Convention Center; National Harbor, MD	20,000*	The Protomen, Triforce Quartet, Makeup and Vanity Set, goto80, cTrix, Awesome Force, Monodeer, DJ Jo, A Rival, Grimecraft, DJ Cutman, the OneUps, Videri String Quartet, Bitforce, nml styl, Richie Branson, Voia, FearofDark, Knight of the Round, Danimal Cannon, Urizen, Machinae Supremacy, the Runaway Guys, Arc Impulse, Mikal kHill, Gemanon, Corset Lore, Creative Mind Frame (AKA 1-UP), (T-T)b, D&D Sluggers, Armcannon, Kadesh Flow, Galaxy Tour Guides, the Returners, Emar, Schaffer the Darklord, Bit Brigade
MAGFest 2018	Jan 4–7, 2018	Gaylord National Convention Center; National Harbor, MD	21,600*	Amanda Lepre, Auxcide, Cowabunga Pizza Time, Crazy Composers Collective feat. Videri String Quartet, Delorean Overdrive, Dollfin, Double Experience, Dr. Zilog, Hyper Potions, Kirby's Dream Band, LonelyRollingStars feat Vince DiCola, MC Lars, Magic Hammer, Marshall Art, Master Sword, NNNNNNNNNN, Powerglove, Rare Candy, Retro-Active Live, RoboRob, Sammus, Sci-Fried, Shubzilla x Bill Beats, SiIvaGunner, Sonic Adventure Music Experience feat. Jun Senoue, Super Guitar Bros, Super Soul Bros, TORIENA, Tetracase, the Mountain Chiefs, Trash80, Varien, Vic Viper, Viking Guitar Live, Washington Metropolitan Gamer Symphony Orchestra, YTCracker, insaneintherainmusic, rainbowdragoneyes, Reid Speed
Super MAGFest 2019	Jan 3–6, 2019	Gaylord National Convention Center; National Harbor, MD	22,200	Takashi Tateishi, Frank Klepacki and the Tiberian Sons, Graz, bryface, don'tblinkoryou'lldie, chibi-tech, HarleyLikesMusic, Blood Code, James Landino, Grimecraft, Ralfington, D*Jadeabella, Kris Maddigan, ConSoul, the Koopa Kids, Bit Brigade, Chromelodeon, Knight of the Round, MC Frontalot, Please Lose Battle, Danimal Cannon, Ocabanda, Triforce Quartet, Supercommuter, Dethlehem, the Runaway Four, Lex the Lexicon Artist, Curious Quail, Sam Mulligan & the Donut Slayers, Wreck the System, Lame Genie, Mega Ran, Professor Shyguy, Steel Samurai
Super MAGFest 2020	Jan 2–5, 2020	Gaylord National Convention Center; National Harbor, MD	24,000	Cheap Dinosaurs, Aethernaut, K-Murdock, Zebbler, EyeQ, the Protomen, Tokyo Machine, Kabuki, Ben Briggs, Funk Fiction, Sammus, Minusworld, Armcannon, Powerglove, Guérin, Xyce, Nanode, Bleeds, Meneo, Dual Core, DiscoCactus, Math the Band, Videri String Quartet, DJ Cutman, Mariachi Entertainment System, More or Les, Marshall Art, Skatune Network, Urizen, Descendants of Erdrick, Super Soul Bros, Flabbercasters
Super MAGFest 2021	Cancelled due to the COVID-19 pandemic in Maryland. An online version was planned that year but also cancelled.			
Super MAGFest 2022	Jan 6–9, 2022	Gaylord National Convention Center; National Harbor, MD	10,581	Bit Brigade, GR3YS0N, Let's Disinfect!, Shubzilla x Bill Beats, Inverse Phase, DV-I, Tetracase, VGR, Groovecube, Mega Ran, Master Sword, Audio Gremlins, Magnificent Danger, Emperor Norton's Stationary Marching Band, the Megas, Damn Selene, Kadesh Flow, Paladin, Kirby's Dream Band, Nullsleep, Dinaari, Cass Cuttlefish, Defense Mechanism, Star Fighter Dreams, Watch Out For Snakes, Super Guitar Bros, Gamebreax, Triforce Quartet, Negativland + Sue-C, Aeoxis
Super MAGFest 2023	Jan 5–8, 2023	Gaylord National Convention Center; National Harbor, MD	18,987	Cybertronic Spree, Nyokee, Metroid Metal, Math the Band, NPC Collective, WASD, Super Soul Bros, Rustage, Brentalfloss, Game Genie Sokolov, Cyanide Dansen, Maxo, Minusbaby, Mikey303, Ohm-I, Snack Attack, DJ Plynk & DJ Dark Prime, 2TD, DV-I, Obi-wan Shinobi, Ryako, Knight of the Round, Capt Crabs, Tiggs & String Player Gamer, Skatune Network, Nelward, DiscoCactus, Button Masher, Lame Genie, the Game Brass, the 8-Bit Big Band, the OneUps
Super MAGFest 2024	Jan 18–21, 2024	Gaylord National Convention Center; National Harbor, MD	c. 30,000	Janus Rose, Zaku, EyeQ, Glorified Magnified, Cowabunga Pizza Time, Francisco "Foco" Cerda, Descendants of Erdrick, Cyanide Dansen, 88Bit, Crashfaster, Lacey Johnson, Flow Mein, Super MadNES, Floor Baba, Gwiz & Robkta, Creep-P, Suzubrah, Skyblew, the Video Game Shredventure, Tournament Arc, the Protomen, Sammus, Metroid Metal, Chk!dsk and Vektroid, Abandon Quest, Ro Panuganti Prog Experience, Project Fusion Saxophone Quartet, Dom Palombi's Game Night, Fibre, Cam Steady, Bit Brigade, Cynthia Harrell
Super MAGFest 2025	Jan 23–26, 2025	Gaylord National Convention Center; National Harbor, MD	24,500*	Lotus Juice, Tee Lopes, Los Veros, Super Strikers, Steel Samurai, Trey Frey, Frivolousshara, Fandom Fight, Double XP Weekend, Djtaylorrae, Tiara Tastemaker & His Precious Gemstones, Lizz Robinett & Friends, Red Vox, Cybertronic Spree, DeLorean Overdrive, the Microphone Misfitz, AmateurLSDJ, Prowess the Testament, the Blueshift Big Band, Kuma the Kami, NMLSTYL, Laamaa, O_Super, Pokerus Project, Bit Shifter, Marshall Art, Shao Dow, Premium Vintage, Master Boot Record, Powerglove, Bit Brigade
Super MAGFest 2026	Jan 8–11, 2026	Gaylord National Convention Center; National Harbor, MD	TBA	The Arkadian, Bit Brigade, Boy Without Batteries, Casey Lee Williams, Danimal Cannon, dannyBstyle, DJ Taylor Senpai, DJ Vega, DonutShoes, Gunderslam, Johnny Gioeli, Mega Ran, the Megas, Nobel Yoo, NO CARRIER, onumi, Petriform, Project Fusion, the Protomen, Rebecca Sugar and Friends, SBThree, SiIvaGunner, Silent, Star Fighter Dreams, Street Cleaner, the Tiberian Sons, Triforce Quartet, TsundereBoys B2B Idol Thots
Super MAGFest 2027	Jan 7–10, 2027	Gaylord National Convention Center; National Harbor, MD	TBA	TBA

=== MAGLabs ===
The main event circuit moved from Virginia to Maryland in 2012. Beginning in 2014 a secondary circuit of smaller events were held at the former primary venue in Virginia. The first two were titled "MAGFest 8.5" and "MAGFest Classic" in reference to their continuation of the original format. From 2016 these were branded as "MAGLabs", a name which has been retained since. The event circuit went on hiatus in 2019 but returned in 2025, with a new venue in Baltimore and the intention of holding it biannually.

Title	Dates	Location	Attendance	Guests
MAGFest 8.5	Sep 12–14, 2014	Hilton Alexandria Mark Center, Alexandria, VA	1,500	Armcannon, Temp Sound Solutions, Professor Shyguy, You Bred Raptors?, Steel Samurai, Eight Bit Disaster, the Protomen, the World Is Square, Those Who Fight
MAGClassic	Sep 11–13, 2015	Hilton Alexandria Mark Center, Alexandria, VA	1,345	Crunk Witch, Sam Mulligan, Brentalfloss, Zantilla, Professor Shyguy, James Landino, Chipocrite, DiscoCactus, Radlib, Triforce Quartet, Super Guitar Bros, You Bred Raptors?, Super Art Fight!, Starship Horizons
MAGLabs	Sep 9–11, 2016	Hilton Alexandria Mark Center, Alexandria, VA	1,315	8-Bit Mullet, Bit Brigade, ChronoWolf, DJ Super Sonic, explosion sound, Flexstyle, Insane Ian, Inverse Phase, the Megas, the NESkimos, Overclocked University, Search Snake, Stargate, Steel Samurai, the Yordles, You Bred Raptors?, OverClocked ReMix, Super Art Fight
MAGLabs 2017	Sep 1–3, 2017	Hilton Alexandria Mark Center, Alexandria, VA	TBC	Professor Shyguy, Master Sword, Noise 2 Men, Cowabunga Pizza Time, D&D Sluggers, F1NG3RS, Crunk Witch, Wreck the System, ERROR MACRO, DJ Super Sonic, and 8-Bit Mullet
MAGLabs 2018	Sep 7-9, 2018	Hilton Alexandria Mark Center, Alexandria, VA	TBC	Flabbercasters, Viking Guitar, Thrillkiller, Cowabunga Pizza Time, Crunk Witch, Knight of the Round, Love Spread, Master Sword, Smoochyface, Steel Samurai, Kenzie Black, Chipocrite, Noisyboys
Event on hiatus, 2019-2024
MAGLabs 2025	Mar 29, 2025	Peabody Heights Brewery, Baltimore, MD	TBA	DK Adventures, Bard City, Steel Samurai
MAGLabs 2026	Mar 21, 2026	Peabody Heights Brewery, Baltimore, MD	TBA	Quick Save, The BGSO Flute Choir
Fall 2026 MAGLabs	Sep 12, 2026	Peabody Heights Brewery, Baltimore, MD	TBA	TBA

=== MAGWest ===
A west coast MAGFest circuit launched in 2017. The event was conducted online in 2020 and 2021 due to the COVID-19 pandemic. These events were uploaded to the official YouTube channel after they concluded.

Title	Date	Location	Attendance	Guests
MAGWest	Aug 25–28, 2017	Hyatt Regency, Santa Clara, CA	TBA	Jason Cirillo, Ben Prunty, Yoga for Gamers, Nino MegaDriver, John Patrick Lowrie, Super Soul Bros, Kirby's Dream Band, Vector Hold, Curious Quail, Space Town, crashfaster, boaconstructor, Extent of the Jam, Myrone, Darren Korb and Ashley Barrett, Richie Branson, the Koopas, Viking Guitar, James Landino, Hyper Potions, and Grimecraft
MAGWest 2018	Aug 10-12, 2018	Hyatt Regency, Santa Clara, CA	TBA	B/I/R/T/H/D/A/Y, Bleeds, Continuum Kingdom, Dokoe, E.N.Cowell, Extra Lives, Kabuki, LEX the Lexicon Artist, MAGWest Chipspace Showcase, Naju, Normal Activity, RoboRob, Sergio and the Holograms, Street Cleaner, Super MadNES, Super Soul Bros, Tetrimino, the Megas, the Night We Met, the Runaway Four, Three O'Clock Rock (School Showcase), Vic Viper
MAGWest 2019	Sep 13-15, 2019	DoubleTree Hilton, San Jose, CA	TBA	8-Bit Jazz Heroes, Alice Knows Karate, B/I/R/T/H/D/A/Y, Ben Briggs, Bolide, Chibi-tech, Chuck None, Comsmicosmo, Dokoe, Hiero, Infinite Combo, Mega Ran, Nick Drexler, Nikola Whallon, NyteXing, Odyssey Eurobeat, Petriform, RoboRob, Ronin Op F, Sergio and the Holograms, SkyBlew, Stemage, Super Soul Bros, Minibosses, Triss, Tttlllrrr, Vector Hold
MAGWest 2020	Oct 2-5, 2020	Moved online due to the COVID-19 pandemic in California		Sare, Toriena, Crashfaster, Bleeds, 88bit, Wreck the System, G-Wiz, Adora Blue, Odyssey Eurobeat, Ohm-I, Super Marcato Bros, Airy Connect, the Arkadian, the Runaway Four, Button Masher, Starfarer, Super Soul Bros, Mark Cooper, Kyozo, Business Pastel
MAGWest 2021	Nov 4-6, 2021	Moved online due to the COVID-19 pandemic in California		Button Mashers, Lacey Johnson, Israfelcello, Super Soul Bros, the Red Panda, Find the Rabbit, Jewel Maiden, Faith in the Glitch, Subskile, Tinywaves, Watch Out For Snakes, Game Genie Sokolov, Only One Ronin, OrchKeystraMusic
MAGWest 2022	Aug 19-21, 2022	DoubleTree Hilton, San Jose, CA	879	88bit, Bleeds, dwangoAC, manadream, Petriform, the Red Panda, VGT, VVGO, Fetz A/V, 7th Street Big Band, Kirby's Dream Band, Shubzilla & Bill Beats, Robbie "Gwobs" Benson, Chase Bethea, Ben Briggs, Super Soul Bros, the Completionist, Mark Cooper, Ian Cowell, Ronin OP F, Lacey Johnson, Extra Lives, Button Masher, Ryan McGaughey, Audio Mocha, Da Rap Nerd, Abstract the Origin, Hyper Potions, Find the Rabbit, Ray Reck, Only One Ronin, Character Select, Wario Speedwagon, Josh of Bonus Stage, Prowess the Testament, 8 Bit Music Theory, the Tonberries, Ben Visini, Tiny Waves
MAGWest 2023	Jul 14-16, 2023	DoubleTree Hilton, San Jose, CA	TBA	The Living Tombstone, SSJ/Dragon Ball Z Experience, Audio Mocha, Character Select, E. N. Cowell, Super Soul Bros, Extra Lives Experience, Illexotic, KEIFERGR33N, 7th Street Big Band, AniClover, Prowess the Testament, Lucrecia, Alice Knows Karate, Noa James, Stickband, the Last Seahorse, Ultra Combo's Mega Jam, Ross Tregenza & Graeme Norgate, Gwiz, Crashfaster, Avery Write & Da Rap Nerd, Nobel Yoo, BAYOKYO
MAGWest 2024	Sep 27-29, 2024	DoubleTree Hilton, San Jose, CA	TBA	Lotus Juice, Bit Brigade, The Tiberian Sons, MASTER BOOT RECORD, Odyssey Eurobeat, Lacey Johnson, FrivolousShara, Super Soul Bros, Super Guitar Bros, Bi Score, Balkan Bleeps, Delorean Overdrive, Cartoon Violence USA, Character Select, OrchKeystra, BAYOKYO, AniClover, Mono Monet, Virtual Video Game Orchestra, OverPowered, Carington Swing, Ryan McGaughey, Dog Food For Bananas, g3ntlebreeze, Ankylo Tail, Co-op Choir, Dæmon Core, Voidgeist, Bay Area Anime Music, Ultra Combo, illexotic, PJ DJ, DJ Owl Eyes
MAGWest 2025	Aug 8–10, 2025	DoubleTree Hilton, San Jose, CA	TBA	Powerglove, Mega Ran, Aivi & Surasshu, Owlbear, Street Cleaner, Premium Vintage, Sammus, Super MadNES, onumi, Lucrecia, Super Soul Bros, JonFlëtch, Adora Blue, Lo(u)ser, Petriform, Virtual Video Game Orchestra, Ultra Combo, The KeyBlades, Under The Deku Tree, Bi Score, AniClover, Love Talkin' Sound, BAYOKYO, Carington Swing Quartet, Co-op Choir, Audio Mocha, Interstellar Soundscapes, Bay Area Anime Music, g3ntlebreeze, Danny Delorean, ImpiriumCrypt, Column SJ, Owl Eyes, PJ DJ, OtakuAcoustics, Data Dealer, The Chocobones, Fishing Minigame, darmock
MAGWest 2026	Aug 14–16, 2026	DoubleTree Hilton, San Jose, CA	TBA	Lotus Juice, Johnny Gioeli, the Cybertronic Spree, Tee Lopes, Aivi & Surasshu, 2 Mello, Frank Klepacki, SiIvaGunner, FamilyJules, The Tiberian Sons, Isakai Stage, Delorean Overdrive, Prog XP and the Fallen Hero Players, miles morkri, Sixth Station Trio, Anton Corazza, Parabellum Raps, jmr (Jeff Roberts), Claire Kwong, Interstellar Soundscapes, Virtual Video Game Orchestra
