= Watch Out For Snakes =

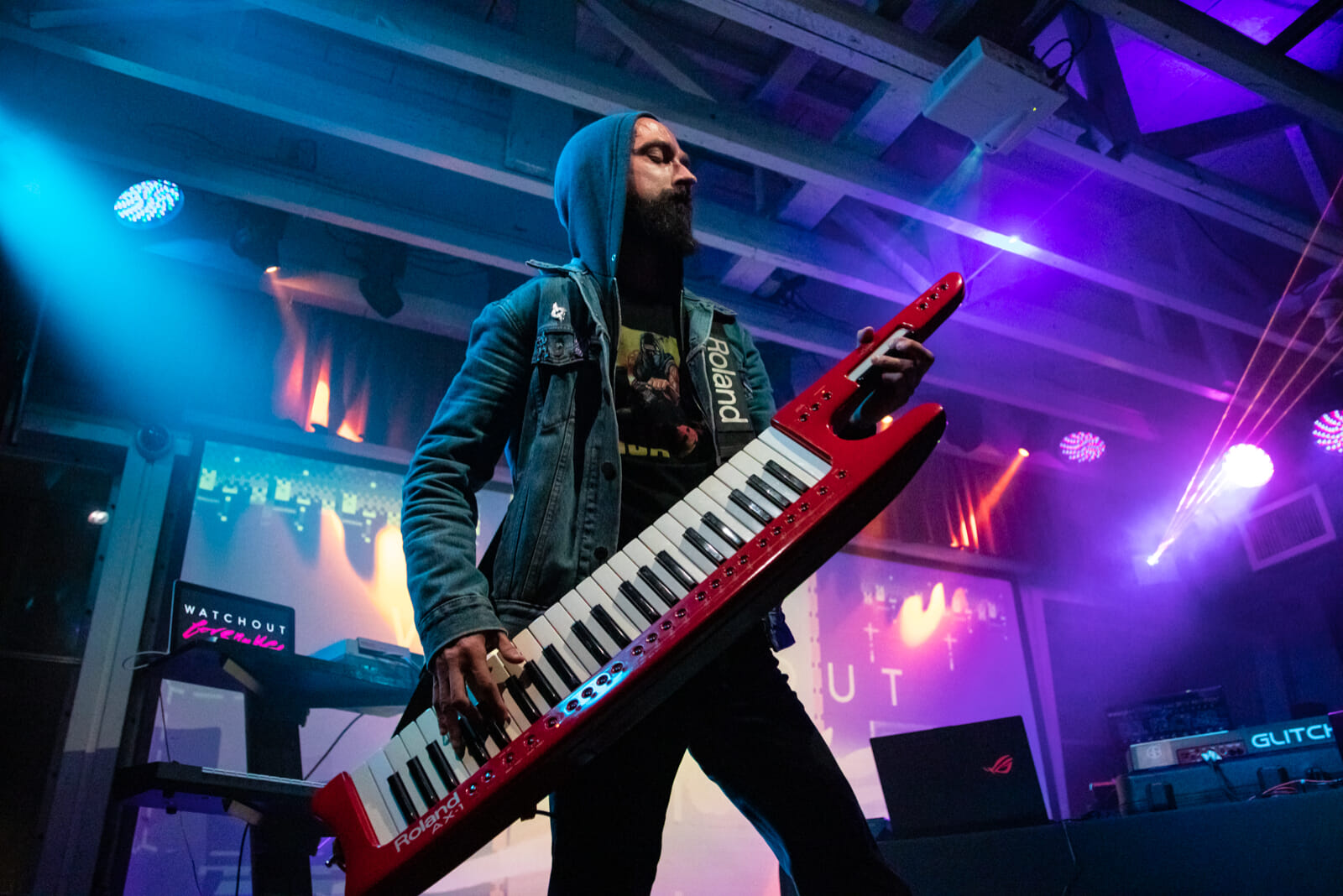
- Watch Out For Snakes at DNA Lounge, San Francisco in November 2019.

Background information
- Birth name: Matthew Stephen Baum
- Born: April 21, 1981 (age 44); Cocoa Beach, Florida, United States
- Origin: Atlanta, Georgia, United States
- Genres: Chipwave; Chiptune; Synthwave; Electronic
- Years active: 2015 – present
- Labels: Bitwave Records; Independent
- Website: watchoutforsnakestheband.bandcamp.com

Matthew Stephen Baum, known professionally as Watch Out For Snakes, is a musician and producer based in Atlanta. He is often credited as a pioneer of the chipwave genre, fusing elements of chiptune and synthwave.

He is also known for placing emphasis on his live performances, which employ a keytar and have been characterized as high-energy and aggressive. He has participated in a number of synthwave, chiptune, and video game music festivals including Echosynthetic Fest, Neon Rose Fest, and MAGFest.

== Style ==
Baum synthesizes his chiptune instrumentation from the Nintendo and Game Boy video game systems. His albums have been described as imaginary video game soundtracks and he has stated that they draw thematically from personal events in his own life.

== Discography ==
=== Albums ===
- UPGRADE (2018)
- Scars (2019)

=== Singles ===
- Rip ‘Em Up! (2019)
- Scars (2019)
- Fight Those Invisible Ninjas (2021)

=== Compilations ===
- "Set Up Us the Bomb” on Neo-Wave Vol. 1 (2018)
- “Arms Race” on Chiptunes = WIN: Volume 7 (2018)
- “This Ain’t No Cutscene” on Lunar Halo (2019)
- “Stranded” on Spacetunes = WIN (2019)

=== Remixes ===
- Frisky Monkey - “Now! (Watch Out For Snakes Remix)” (2019)
- The Warhorse - “Can’t Stop the Clop (Watch Out For Snakes Remix)” (2019)

=== Other ===
- MacReady - “Sunset on Mt. Fuji (ft. Watch Out For Snakes)” on Kiba (2019)

== See also ==
- Geek rock
- Mystery Science Theater 3000
- Nerd music
