= Stemage =

American guitarist and composer

- Born: Grant Henry; April 3, 1979 (age 47)
- Genres: Video game music; space rock; metal
- Instruments: Guitar, drums, vocals
- Years active: 1997–present
- Labels: Brave Wave Productions, Materia Collective
- Website: stemagemusic.com

Grant Henry (born April 3, 1979), better known by his stage name Stemage, is an American guitarist and composer. He is known for his video game and television soundtracks, including Cartoon Network's animated series Steven Universe. He is also known for his involvement in several video game cover projects, including Metroid Metal and Viking Guitar.

== Career ==
=== Early work (1997–2002) ===
Stemage began writing and performing music in high school. He recorded an original album in 1997 named Organized Uproar, using a cassette 8-track in his dorm room. The album was later released for free via his website. He then joined a band named MiniVoid.

=== Metroid Metal and solo work (2003–2014) ===
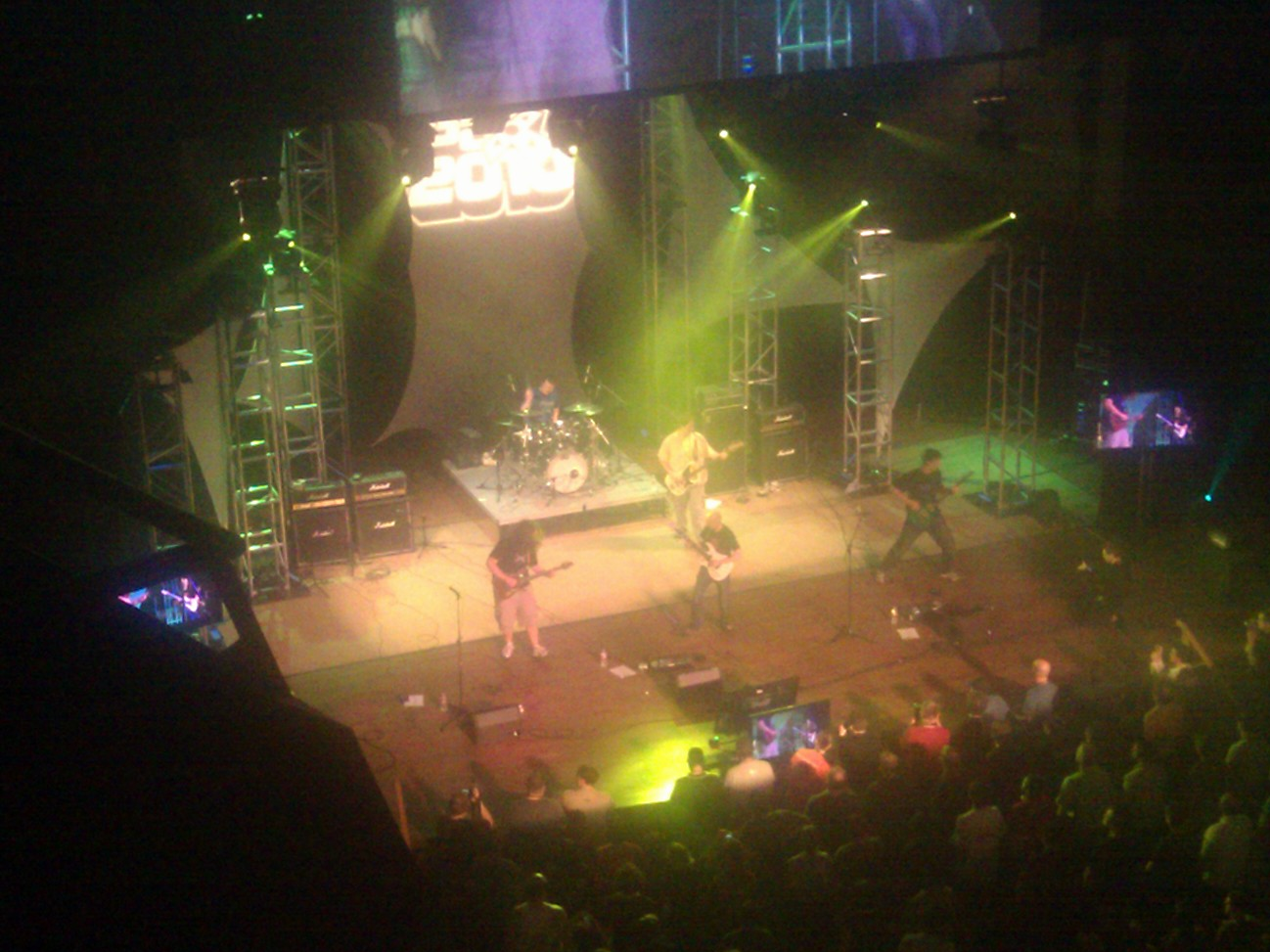
Metroid Metal at Pax Prime 2010

In 2003, Stemage formed Metroid cover project Metroid Metal, later recruiting other artists such as Danimal Cannon. While the group were initially simply recording cover songs to release online, Metroid Metal made their live debut at MAGFest 7 in 2009, and became a recurring act at the event. Stemage released several albums with the group over the following years, including Varia Suite (2009), Expansion Pack (2010) and Other Album (2014). Stemage along with the other musicians from Metroid Metal Live formed the "backbone" of Yes Mayhem, a second band that produced original material beginning in 2010.

During this time, he released two original albums as a solo artist- Strati (2006) and Zero Over Zero (2011). He also began working on original video game soundtracks, beginning with the Xbox Live game Alpha Squad (2010). In an interview shortly before the game's release, he described composing for video games as "acting on a blue screen with a director telling you that the Master Control Program is off in the distance, and it's big—except that there's no director, and the MCP is a sketch of a dude with a gun."

Stemage also produced some cover material for charity. The proceeds from his Grandia II cover album Frets of Valmar (2011) went towards Japan's recovery efforts after the earthquake and tsunami. He later took part in the five disc Chrono Trigger cover album Chronicles of Time (2013), which supported Doctors without borders.

=== Steven Universe and collaborations (2014–2019) ===
Stemage began providing guitar work for Cartoon Network's Steven Universe from the second season. Initially this was for the revised opening theme, but he worked on the remainder of the show's soundtrack. The first soundtrack volume reached #22 on the Billboard 200. A second volume followed in 2019, peaking at #28 on the Billboard 200, and #12 on the US iTunes chart. Stemage also co-composed the soundtrack for the 2019 film.

Stemage performed with several bands over the period, including a brief tenure with LONELYROLLINGSTARS, working on their 2014 album CARNIVORTEX and performing live at MAGFest 12 to support the release. His departure later in the year was announced by the band in the form of a music video. During the video, Stemage walks out midway through a performance of Royal Rainbow Road to be replaced by new guitarist Mega Beardo. Stemage joined Viking Guitar in 2014, alongside Travis Morgan, Mega Beardo, and founder Erik Peabody. Viking Guitar originated as a solo act fronted by Peabody, with which Stemage had featured as a guest on several occasions. The new incarnation of the band released their debut studio album Legion later that year while continuing the annual Danse Macabre projects that Stemage had been involved in earlier. In 2018, Stemage also joined a band called Super Strikers, along with video game composers Keiji Yamagishi and Manami Matsumae. The group performed live for the first time at MAGFest 2018, the recordings of which were used for the second disc of Yamagishi's album The Retro-Active Experience.

Stemage released one further original solo album, Narrowband in 2016. In a blog post he expressed a desire to continue producing original material in a shorter format and at a faster pace. One further cover album followed the next year, with Retrogression (2017). The album featured various video game tracks played backwards; Stemage was inspired by the main theme of The Legend of Zelda: Skyward Sword which is simply Zelda's Lullaby played backwards.

=== Focus on soundtracks (2019–) ===
From the late 2010s onwards, Stemage worked on a number of game soundtracks including Card of Darkness (2019), Ikenfell (2020) and Hextech Mayhem (2021), both as a composer and as a session guitarist. When discussing his work on the Bubsy: Paws on Fire! soundtrack, which was released via video game music label Materia Collective, Stemage indicated that it was a challenging but enjoyable project, adding "If you hear a hi-hat playing Morse code during one of the songs, don't say I didn't warn you."

Outside of his soundtrack work, Stemage also released his fourth album with Yes Mayhem, Bandwagon (2020). In 2022 Stemage performed live with both Metroid Metal and Viking Guitar at Bit Gen Gamerfest in the same evening. The set was further complicated by both bands missing members due to COVID infections, which required getting guest musicians rapidly up to speed. With the aid of three guests between them, both bands were able to perform live; the event marked the first live Metroid Metal performance in four years.

== Style and influences ==
He has described his music as "Catchy, high-energy space rock mixed with metal, pop, and prog". He has cited stylistic influences such as Failure, Stone Temple Pilots, Self, Hum, Meshuggah and Shiner.

== Discography ==
=== Solo ===
==== Studio albums ====
- Organized Uproar (1998)
- Strati (2006)
- Zero over Zero (2011)
- Narrowband (2016)

==== Cover albums ====
- Frets of Valmar: Grandia II (2011)
- Where Good Marbles Go to Die (2012)
- Priority One (2013)
- Retrogression (2017)

==== Compilation albums ====
- MISC [old stuff] (2011)
- Spookage, Vol 1 (2022)

=== MiniVoid ===
- 14 Days (1999)
- Readjust (2000)

=== Metroid Metal ===
- Varia Suite (2009)
- Expansion Pack EP (2010)
- Other Album (2014)

=== Yes Mayhem ===
- Yes Mayhem (2010)
- HH2 (2012)
- Super VG Christmas Party (2014, as guest)
- Molly (2016)
- Castellum Sanguis LXVIII: Castlevania X68000 Tribute Album (2018, as guest)
- Bandwagon (2020)

=== LONELYROLLINGSTARS ===
- CARNIVORTEX (2014)

=== Viking Guitar ===
- Viking Guitar (2010, as guest)
- Made of Metal (2011, as guest)
- Danse Macabre (2012, as guest)
- Danse Macabre II (2013, as guest)
- Legion (2014)
- Danse Macabre III (2014)
- Danse Macabre IV (2015)
- Danse Macabre V (2016)
- Danse Macabre VI (2017)
- Warpath (2018)
- Live (2018)
- God Gave Rock 'n' Roll to You (2020)
- Danse Macabre 7 (2020)
- Belly of the Beast (2021)
- Hello, Boils and Ghouls! (2021)

=== Super Strikers ===
- The Retro-Active Experience (2019)
- Card of Darkness: The Remixes (2019, as guest)
- Giants (2024, as guest)
- Gimmick! Official Arranged Soundtrack (2025, as guest)

=== Soundtracks ===
==== TV and film ====
- For Catherine (2005)
- Steven Universe (2013–19, with Aivi & Surasshu)
- Steven Universe: The Movie (2019, with many others)
- Steven Universe Future (2019–20, with Aivi & Surasshu)
- Battle Kitty (2022, with Max Coburn)
- Suicide for Beginners (2022)
- DC Heroes United (TV Series 2024)

==== Video games ====
- Alpha Squad (2011)
- Saturday Morning RPG (2012, arrangement credits with C-Jeff on a track)
- Aeternum (2013, with Viking Guitar)
- Band Saga (2014, with Rekcahdam)
- The Metronomicon: Slay the Dance Floor (2016, with many others)
- Runner3 (2018)
- Bubsy: Paws on Fire! (2019)
- Card of Darkness (2019)
- Ikenfell (2020, guitar credits)
- Dangle Dash (2021)
- Space Otter Charlie (2021)
- Chicory: A Colorful Tale (2021, guitar credits)
- Moonglow Bay (2021, guitar credits)
- Hextech Mayhem (2021)
- Soundfall (2022, with many others)
- Rogue Legacy 2 (2022, with many others)
- Tchia (2023, main theme)
- Super Catboy (2023, with Tscholdes & Anton Corazza)
- Bit. Trip Rerunner + Runner Maker (2023)
- DC Heroes United (2024)

==== Pinball Machines ====
- Avatar: The Battle for Pandora (Jersey Jack Pinball 2024)

==== Devolver Digital events ====
- Devolver Digital Direct 2020 - Play the Game
- Devolver Digital Direct 2021 - Daydream
- Devolver Digital Summer Game Fest 2022 - Singularity

=== Guest appearances ===
- Off Centre – The Streets We've Known All our Lives (2004)
- The Nurse who Loved Me: A Tribute to Failure (2008)
- C-Jeff – Preschtale (2012)
- Disasterpeace – Cycles (2012)
- Perelandra Records – Tide (2012)
- Disasterpeace – FZ: Side F (2013)
- Random Encounter – Let Me Tell You a Story (2013)
- C-Jeff – Big Steel Wheels (2013)
- Nate Horsfall – Spectrum of Mana (2013)
- Chiptunes = Win - Chiptunes = WTFLOL (2013)
- Brave Wave Productions – In Flux (2014, with Manami Matsumae)
- Big Giant Circles – Glory Days Remixed (2014)
- Alexander Brandon – Just Fun (2014)
- Careless Juja – For Naughty Children (2015)
- Keiji Yamagishi – Retro-Active Pt. 1 (2015)
- MunzadetH - A Tribute to SHATTERHAND (2016)
- Patient Corgi – SOUND WAVES: A Tribute to Ecco the Dolphin (2016)
- Nate Horsfall – Chronicles of Time (2016)
- Aivi & Surrashu – Rio Olympics Google Doodle (2016)
- Keiji Yamagishi – Retro-Active Pt. 2 (2016)
- Brave Wave Productions – World 1–2 (2017)
- Manami Matsumae – Three Movements (2017)
- Jon Poulin – With Vigor (2017)
- Chiptunes = Win – Chips = Flipped (2018)
- Sam Mulligan & The Donut Slayers – Shark Party (2018)
- Kirby's Dream Band - Bat out of HAL (2020)
- Jon Poulin - Big Riff Energy (2021)
- Bossies play Bosses - A Tribute to Matt Wood (2021)
- MunzadetH - A Tribute to KICK MASTER (2021)
