= Inverse Phase =

American composer and chiptune musician

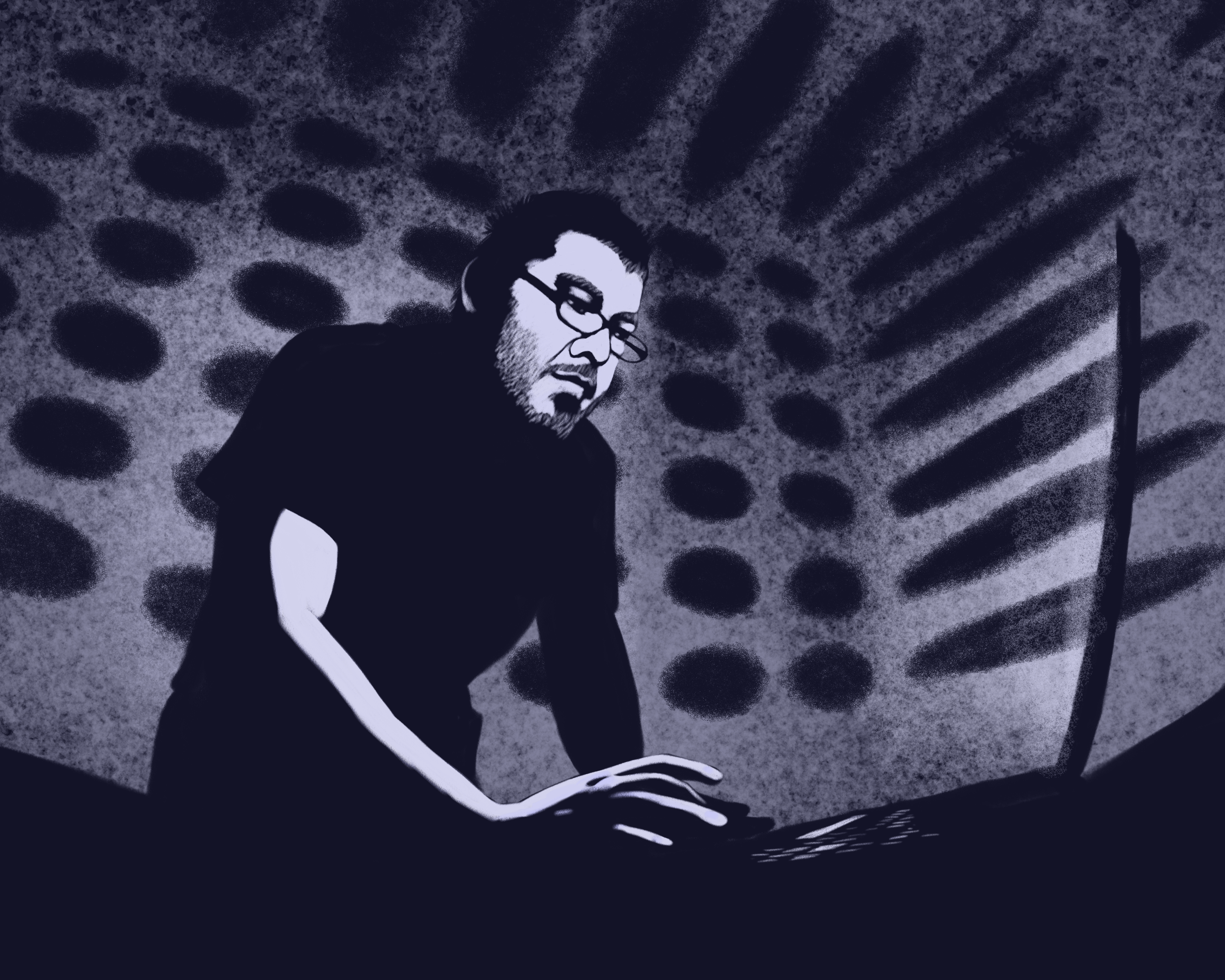
- Inverse Phase performing.

Background information
- Born: Brendan Becker; October 1979 (age 47); United States
- Origin: Baltimore, Maryland
- Genre: Chiptune
- Occupations: Musician; video game composer
- Website: inversephase.com

Brendan Becker, known by his stage name Inverse Phase, is an American video game composer and chiptune musician, using Atari, Commodore, and Nintendo hardware. He also speaks and hosts workshops on video game music, chiptunes, and composing.

== Biography ==
Becker, born in America in 1979, states that he had a typical childhood where he was obsessed with video games and Saturday-morning cartoons. While he was enrolled in a piano class at an early age, he did not keep interest due to attention span issues. However, his interest in computers, programming, and music led him to the demoscene. He soon began composing music with a music tracker for games written by his grade school friends, as well as various remixes and covers.

In 2010, Becker received extensive media coverage for his NES parody of CeeLo Green's single, "Fuck You". A month later, the soundtrack to the video game Super Meat Boy featured his song "Boss Burger N' Chips", a remix of the first and second level boss themes.

In mid-2011, Becker announced that he had gone full-time with his music and was working on multiple game soundtracks. Later that year, he released soundtracks to Super Smash Land and Shuttle Scuttle, handing out copies of the latter to MAGFest X attendees at a secret show shortly thereafter.

In June 2012, he released Pretty Eight Machine, a tribute album of industrial rock band Nine Inch Nails' 1989 debut album Pretty Hate Machine. Inverse Phase had been able to raise $3,654 for making and promoting the album through the crowdfunding website Kickstarter. Rob Sheridan, who is associated with Nine Inch Nails, tweeted about the album shortly after its release.

While fulfilling Kickstarter rewards for Pretty Eight Machine, Becker released Treachery in Beatdown City: Episode 1 EP, the soundtrack to a game seeking funding on Kickstarter in 2014. The kickstarter names Inverse Phase as the composer for the rest of the game, which was released in 2020. He also plans to tribute U2 as well as more Nine Inch Nails, which he claims to be one of his favorite acts.

== Discography ==
Video game soundtracks

- Super Smash Land (2011, self-released)
- Shuttle Scuttle (2011, self-released)
- Treachery in Beatdown City: Episode 1 EP (2014, self-released)

Tribute albums

- Pretty Eight Machine (2012, self-released)
- Chiplust (2014, self-released)
- The Chipping of Isaac (2014, self-released)
- Save Chiptune (2015, self-released)

Original albums ("Biteration" series)

- Biteration I: Genesis of Consequence (2016, self-released)
