= Descendants of Erdrick =

American video game music cover band

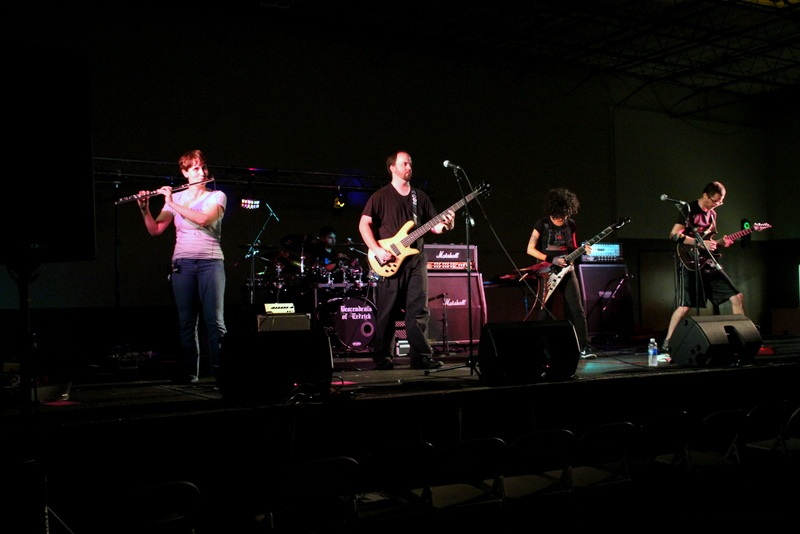

Background information
- Origin: Austin, Texas, United States
- Genre: Video game music
- Years active: 2009–present
- Label: DoE Music
- Members: Amanda Lepre (Guitar, Vocals); Thad Stevens (Bass); Jim Watson (Drums)
- Past members: Chris Taylor; Mike "Lobos" Villalobos; John Pike; Lauren Liebowitz; Glenn Elliott; Emily Thompson; Winry Ember (Keyboards)
- Website: www.descendantsoferdrick.com

Descendants of Erdrick is an American video game music cover band based out of Austin, Texas. They play arrangements of classic video game music, and are the first video game music cover band to appear in their own video game.

== History ==
Descendants of Erdrick had its origins in a Myspace page first created by guitarist Amanda Lepre in 2007, named after the titular character from Dragon Warrior. After meeting bassist Chris Taylor in 2008, the pair played a few small shows in 2009 before expanding into a full band in 2010. The band was soon filled out by guitarist Mike "Lobos" Villalobos, drummer/sound engineer John Pike, and flautist Lauren Liebowitz via an ad on Craigslist.

Descendants of Erdrick has played such venues as Electronic Entertainment Expo, San Japan, MAGfest, Richard Garriott's Britannia Manor, and was ranked 6th for Best Performing Instrumental Band in the Austin Chronicle's "2010 Austin Music Awards" online poll. Jayson Napolitano of Original Sound Version named the band's performance at MAGFest his "favorite act of the night".

In 2013 the Descendants of Erdrick announced a new membership lineup on their Facebook page. The band shifted their musical style to reflect the change in instrumentation and has continued to make music.

== Battle Legend Infinity ==
Austin-based software company GameSalad launched its first original IP, titled Battle Legend Infinity on January 6, 2012, for the iPhone, iPod Touch and iPad. The game stars the 5 original members of the band representing characters from classic video games.

== Discography ==
- But Thou Must. (2010)
- Down Right Heavy (2010)
- Thanks a Million (2013)
- Advent (2014)

== See also ==
- Video game music culture
- MAGFest
