= Temple of Yog =

Indie video game released on Wii U in 2015

- Developer: ChudChud Industries
- Publisher: ChudChud Industries
- Director: Cody Diefenthaler
- Programmer: Cody Diefenthaler
- Artist: Lee Bretschneider
- Composer: Dr. Zilog
- Platform: Wii U
- Release: NA: December 16, 2015; EU: January 7, 2016
- Genres: Action, Roguelike
- Mode: Single-player

Temple of Yog is a 2D retro-style shoot 'em up roguelike, developed and published by independent video game developer ChudChud Industries. The game was released exclusively on the Nintendo Wii U in North America on December 16, 2015, and in Europe on January 7, 2016. While the game received generally mixed reviews, it was notably praised for its unique use of the Wii U GamePad.

== Gameplay ==
Temple of Yog starts with a tutorial level, playing as 'Ao the Original', that explains the basic movement, defense and shooting controls of the game and earns the Compass item. Players can use shadow power to teleport between the game's light and shadow realms, which are displayed on the television and the display on the Wii U GamePad, respectively. Players use this dual-screen technique to navigate through a labyrinth. Whichever realm the player character is not currently occupying is displayed on the GamePad, which allows for strategy in navigating the maze and engaging enemies. Many elements of the game are procedurally generated based on player data, such as the layout of the game's levels and item system.

After the tutorial, players first choose a tribute from four starting guilds based on distinct archetypes: The Holy Augers (clerics), the Cult of the Magi (mages), the Livid Blades (warriors), and the Rogue's Nest (rogues), each with their own unique base stats consisting of HP (hit points), MP (magic points) and SHW (shadow power). Each guild features a different play style based on range, strength and speed of attack and a special ability. The clerics can heal themselves, the mages can manifest a shield, the warriors have a high-powered fireball attack, and the rogues utilize a high-speed roll maneuver. Upon selection, the tribute is given a name (such as Gougre the Worldly or Clementine the Hidden) and sent to the temple.

The game is played via dungeon runs inside a temple which are initiated by walking through a portal at the temple zenith. Before entering the player can choose to equip a previously earned item from one of the pedestals surrounding the portal. Once inside, players earn Boon Points during each temple run by defeating enemies, such as spiders and snakes, and completing quests given by multi-colored obelisks. After the run, the tribute is ranked on a scale that goes from "pitiful" and "weak" up to "worthy." Boon earned can be spent afterwards on upgrading the stats of each guild.

== Plot ==
In Temple of Yog, the player acts as a deity that plays as sacrificial tributes from four guilds through a procedurally-generated labyrinth filled with dangerous enemies.

== Development and release ==
Temple of Yog was announced on August 28, 2014, and was in development for approximately a year and a half. In 2015, developer ChudChud Industries took the game on tour, stopping in seven cities for live events featuring a preview of the game and a series of live musical performances by the game's soundtrack composer Dr. Zilog and master of ceremonies Buster Wolf. Artist Lee Bretschneider was also featured on the tour. The official trailer was uploaded to Bretschneider's YouTube channel on October 5, 2016. Temple of Yog was released in North America on December 16, 2015, and in Europe on January 7, 2016.

The game was delisted from the Nintendo eShop in North America between 2018 and 2019. It was not delisted in Europe, however, and remained available to purchase in that region until March 27, 2023.

== Graphics ==
Temple of Yog features 16-bit-inspired graphics designed to resemble classic games. The pixel art for the game was made by Lee Bretschneider in Photoshop and was designed specifically to be friendly to color-blind players.

== Soundtrack ==
Temple of Yog features a chiptune soundtrack composed by Dr. Zilog. A sampler of the game's soundtrack has been released for download via Bandcamp.

== Reception ==
Temple of Yog was met with mixed reviews and has a Metacritic score of 54.

Some reviewers praised the game, such as Mike Diver of Vice who said, "There's rather more to this title than surface impressions suggest. Indeed, it quickly becomes quite compelling," and speculated that it "could become quite the cult hit of 2016." Tyler Treese of We Got This Covered also suggested it was worth a look despite its problems, calling it a "fun diversion" and stating "If you're a Wii U owner, you owe it to yourself to check out one of the few games that actually takes advantage of the GamePad.".

Temple of Yog was also an official selection in the 'Digital' category at the 2015 Indiecade festival, the international indie game festival held annually in Culver City (Los Angeles), California.
