= Bit Brigade =

American rock band; performs live to NES speedruns

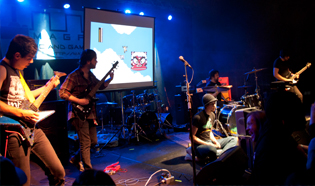
- The group performing at MAGFest VI, 2008

Background information
- Origin: Athens, Georgia
- Genres: Math rock; video game music
- Years active: 2004–present
- Members: Bryant Williamson; Mike Albanese; Luke Fields; Noah McCarthy; Taylor Washington
- Past members: Jace Bartet; Andy Pruett
- Website: www.bitbrigade.net

Bit Brigade is a rock band that performs covers of video game soundtracks. They are known for their unusual format during live performances, which involves band member Noah McCarthy performing a NES video game speedrun on stage. The rest of the band performs the soundtrack of that game live as an accompaniment, matching McCarthy's gameplay. Bandcamp described the group as "The biggest speedrunners in rock", while The Pitch described them as "One of the biggest names in video game soundtrack cover bands".

== History ==
The group was founded in 2004 by Bryant Williamson, Mike Albanese and Andy Pruett, then of the math rock band Cinemechanica, with speedrunner Noah McCarthy. During a late night NES Contra marathon someone suggested performing a rock adaptation of the music. Williamson had previously met McCarthy at a Cinemechanica show and was aware of his talent for classic games, so he called him despite it being around 2 or 3 AM to pitch the idea. McCarthy agreed. Initially the group performed as CONTRABAND when playing Contra, and as MEGABAND when performing Mega Man 2. While initially a side project for the Cinemechanica musicians, the project evolved into a regularly touring group. After a few lineup changes, the group added bassist Luke Fields and guitarist Jace Bartet and the name was changed to Bit Brigade. The game repertoire was also expanded to include Metroid, The Legend of Zelda and Castlevania.

The band's early performances involved a "DIY setup", with a TV connected to a projector. Stage management became an issue however as the TV could very easily be knocked over during the performance, or the game- which was running on original, aging hardware- could crash. In later years the group moved to use a "pre-loaded digital console" to reduce the likelihood of hardware issues. The ROMs which are used during performances have been hacked to remove the original music, but retain the games' sound effects. Fields stated in 2023 that the prospect of technology issues was "always in the back of your mind" during performances even with the modernised approach. The speedrun itself can sometimes go awry also; the group only performed Castlevania III twice due to the difficulty of the run. In interview Fields described an occasion where McCarthy picked up the wrong item during a performance.

The group has released some performances of their shows online, with a 2012 MAGFest performance of Mega Man 2 reaching 600,000 views by 2018. However, the group is more focused on live performances than on recordings or maintaining an online presence.

In 2023, Jace Bartet left the group and was replaced by full time guitarist Taylor Washington.

== Style and influences ==
Melodically, the group perform the original soundtracks as closely as possible. Fields has stated that the group is attempting to perform the music "exactly as it exists in the game, which is typically what we’re trying to do unless we absolutely can’t." Sometimes deviations are necessary as NES music was not typically designed to be performed by traditional instruments, and used a high degree of rhythmic and melodic complexity within the limited track format. The group perform using a lead guitar, rhythm guitar, bass and drumkit. Fields has compared the group to a jazz ensemble, acknowledging that "Everyone's kind of playing off each other, but at one point in every song someone's kind of in the lead." This includes McCarthy's NES playing as well as the musicians, as he is at times working with musical cues.

== Discography ==
=== Studio albums ===
- Contra (2012)
- Ninja Band (2014)
- Castlebandia (2014)
- Metroid (2015)
- Mega Man II (2016)
- The Legend of Zelda (2017)
- Mega Man 3 (2019)
- Duck Tales (2021)
- Batman (2022)
