= 8BitMMO =

- Official logo
- Developer: Archive Entertainment
- Composers: Danimal Cannon; Zef; Protodome; Honin Myo Audio
- Platforms: Java; Microsoft Windows; OS X Linux
- Release: WW: January 26, 2015
- Genre: MMO
- Mode: Multiplayer

8BitMMO is a massively multiplayer free-to-play sandbox game created by Robby Zinchak. The game launched as a browser game on June 19, 2011. In addition to the browser version, it was released as a Steam Early Access title on December 14, 2013, and left Early Access with Version 1.0 on January 26, 2015. It was created and is actively developed by Robby Zinchak. Users are encouraged to build in a shared world and undertake player versus environment and player versus player combat.

On February 14, 2014, a chiptune soundtrack was included with music from Danimal Cannon, Zef, Protodome, and Honin Myo Audio.

== Gameplay ==
A player surrounded by player-made artwork of Mario, a power star, and a NES controller.

8BitMMO is a sandbox game with a focus on building. It features one central, persistent world shared by all players. Alongside building, quests are offered by non-player characters (NPCs), which involve tasks such as killing "LawyerCats" and building. Player versus player and player versus environment combat is available in the "Transponders" game mode.

== Development and release ==
8BitMMO is developed by Archive Entertainment, a one-man studio founded by Robby Zinchak. Development started as early as 2001, with Zinchak restarting development several times. 8BitMMO was first revealed and made playable as a Java-based browser game on June 19, 2011 on Zinchak's blog. In 2012, the game was uploaded to Steam's Greenlight platform, with it being accepted onto the main storefront on August 28, 2013.

To support server upgrades and the development of a Mac version, a crowdfunding campaign was launched on October 1, 2013. Supporting the campaign would grant immediate access to the game's Windows release, and the campaign ended successfully in November. 8BitMMO launched onto Steam as an Early Access title on December 13, 2013. On January 26, 2015, with the release of Version 1.0, the game left Early Access.

== Awards ==
- 2013 Seattle Independent Game Competition - Winner
- Indie Prize Showcase, San Francisco - Director's Choice
- Tokyo Game Show: Sense Of Wonder Night - 2014 Best Technological Game Award
- Indie Stream Fes - Nominated
