= Dr. Zilog =

American chiptune metal band

- Origin: Denver, CO
- Genres: Chiptune, Metal
- Years active: 2007 - Present
- Label: Pixel Glitch
- Members: Pieter Montoulieu, Jackson Kaufman, Eric W. Brown

Dr. Zilog is a chiptune metal trio from Denver, Colorado. The band blends 8-bit chiptune melodies with real guitars and drums.

== Career ==
Dr. Zilog first gained notoriety in the chiptune community releasing 8-bit covers of indie pop hits like Animal Collective's song 'My Girls' and MGMT's hit 'Kids' to the chiptune community site 8-bit Collective in 2009.

Dr. Zilog was credited as the composer of the soundtrack to the 2015 indie video game Temple of Yog on the Wii U, with Vice making a comparison to the soundtracks of classic Amiga video games developed by The Bitmap Brothers.

The band played at MagFest in 2018.

== Discography ==
Albums

- 2008: The Satellite of Love
- 2009: Chip 'Em All
- 2010: Endless Hallway
- 2011: RetroActivity
- 2012: Vulgar Fractions
- 2016: Unknown Command
- 2017: Obstreperous
