= Just Shapes & Beats =

2018 video game

- Developer: Berzerk Studio
- Publisher: Berzerk Studio
- Director: Simon "Lachhh" Lachance
- Designers: Gildedguy; Marc-Antoine Jean; Gavin Jones; Clement Lachance; Hélène Lachance; Simon Lachance; Vincent Longpré; Michael Molinari
- Programmers: Étienne Bedard; Simon Lachance; Olivier Lamontagne; Shayne "Kojak" Wheeler
- Artist: Émilie "Em" Bourget
- Composers: Danimal Cannon; Shirobon
- Engine: Unity
- Platforms: Windows, Nintendo Switch, Linux, macOS, PlayStation 4, Xbox One, Xbox Series X/S
- Release: May 31, 2018: Windows; WW: May 31, 2018; Switch; NA: May 31, 2018; EU: June 21, 2018; Linux, Mac; WW: February 24, 2019; PS4; NA: May 10, 2019; EU: May 30, 2019; Stadia; WW: June 30, 2020; Xbox One & Series X/S; WW: May 31, 2022
- Genres: Bullet hell, music
- Modes: Single-player, multiplayer

Just Shapes & Beats is a music-based bullet hell video game developed and published by Canadian indie team Berzerk Studio. It was released on May 31, 2018, for Windows and Nintendo Switch, February 24, 2019, for macOS and Linux, May 10, 2019, for PlayStation 4 in the United States, and May 30, 2019 for PlayStation 4 in Europe, Russia, and Australia. It was also released on June 30, 2020, for Stadia, and on May 31, 2022, for Xbox One and Xbox Series X/S. In the game, players control a coloured shape and dodge pink shapes that move to the beat of background music.

== Gameplay ==
Player fighting with one of the bosses of the game, evading their attacks

Just Shapes & Beats consists of multiple levels based around individual music tracks—predominantly chiptune—by artists including Nitro Fun, Danimal Cannon, Noisestorm, and Pegboard Nerds.

Up to four players control one small shape each, represented by either a cyan square as player 1, a yellow triangle as player 2, a green pentagon as player 3 or an orange circle as player 4. Players dodge attacks in the form of various shapes typically coloured in pink, such as beams, bouncing waves, pulsating shapes, and bouncing circles. These attacks appear and move in rhythm to the music, with difficulty increasing the further players progress. All levels are divided into normal runs where the goal of the player is to survive until the checkpoint appears, and harder difficulty boss battles, where the player survives till the end without any checkpoints

Getting struck by an attack causes the player to lose hitpoints. Players can take up to three hits in regular tracks before breaking, and six during boss tracks. If the shape breaks entirely, the game rewinds to the previous checkpoint or back to the start in the case of the boss battles; if it breaks in multiplayer, other players can touch the "dead" floating spot (if it has not gone off the screen) to revive them with one remaining hit point. Three breaks within a single level results in a game over screen, with the text stating "It's Over" and the cyan square breaking into pieces. Tapping Enter multiple times causes the square to fix itself and changes the screen's text to read "It's NOT Over", allowing the player to continue from the beginning of the level. At the top of the screen, a bar with a white triangle at the end serves as the progress bar for each level. In story mode, mini-games involving additional character movements exist as filler between levels.

Aside from the main story mode, the game offers playlist, challenge, and party (music only) modes; the former two can be played to collect "Beatpoints", an additive and accumulative scoring system based on the player's performance and amount of levels played. A "Hardcore" difficulty was added in 2019, which increases the difficulty of available levels by reducing reaction times and adding more attacks.

== Development ==
Just Shapes & Beats was developed by Canadian developer Berserk Studio.

The first demo of the game was revealed at PAX 2016 and was meant to be released that summer. During the event, the release date was delayed from late 2016 to early 2017. The game was eventually delayed again, with a launch date of summer 2018. On March 20, 2018, it was announced that the game would also receive a release on the Nintendo Switch. On December 4, 2019, the Just Shovels & Knights update was released, containing 4 remixes of pieces from the Shovel Knight soundtrack. On June 25, 2021, the studio announced that "The Lost Chapter" would be added to the game in an update on July 23. The update consists of five new tracks, including a remix of "Spider Dance" from Undertale. As its title suggests, the update brings back a "lost" segment of the story mode which was planned but not implemented in the initial release. On April 21, 2022, it was announced that the game would receive a release on the Xbox One and Xbox Series X/S consoles on May 31.

== Reception ==
Reception

Aggregate score
Aggregator	Score
Metacritic	(NS) 83/100

Review scores
Publication	Score
Destructoid	8/10
Edge	7/10
Nintendo Life	9/10
Nintendo World Report	9/10

Just Shapes & Beats well received, its simplicity has been described as its "greatest strength" and "elegance". Reviewers noted how the game "brings its intertwined music and aesthetics together to create something demanding, but rewarding, and ultimately unique", creating memorable and inventive experience. Other players highlighted how the game is hard to put down, providing fun gameplay, to which is very easy to come back in any time.

On review aggregator Metacritic, Just Shapes & Beats has received 83/100, indicating "generally favourable reviews".

=== Accolades ===
- PAX Prime, 2014
  - Indie Megabooth Alumni
- PAX East, 2015
  - Indie Megabooth Alumni
  - SideQuesting Team Choice Award
  - Destructoid Best of PAX
- Golden Joystick Awards, 2018
  - Best Audio Design nominee
  - Best Indie Game nominee
- Independent Games Festival Awards, 2018
  - Excellence in Visual Art
