= San Japan =

Japanese Culture and Anime Convention

Coordinates: 29°25′15″N 98°29′5″W

- Status: Active
- Genre: Anime, Manga, Far East popular culture
- Venue: Henry B. Gonzalez Convention Center; San Antonio Grand Hyatt Hotel
- Location: San Antonio, Texas
- Country: United States
- Inaugurated: 2007
- Attendance: 37,587 in 2026
- Organizer: San Japan, LLC
- Website: www.san-japan.org

San Japan is an annual three-day anime convention held during August/September at the Henry B. Gonzalez Convention Center and San Antonio Grand Hyatt Hotel in San Antonio, Texas. The convention is held over Labor Day weekend.

== Programming ==
The convention typically offers an arcade, Artist's Alley, car show, charity auction, concerts, cosplay chess, cosplay dating game, dealers room, electronic dances, a formal masquerade, grand cosplay show, Idol Festival, Lolita fashion show, panels, Maid Cafe, tabletop gaming, video games, and workshops. The tabletop gaming space is open 24 hours a day during the convention.

The 2014 convention had a blood drive and the charity auction benefited the San Antonio Battered Women and Children's Center. The 2015 convention had a blood drive and some charity funds were donated to San Antonio Pets Alive. San Japan held a blood drive, food drive, and the Charity Auction would benefit disABILITYsa in 2017. The 2018 charity auction benefited disABILITYsa and UTSA East Asia Institute. In 2018, San Japan brought $3.6 million to the local economy. San Antonio Food Bank benefited from the conventions charity fundraisers in 2020. The 2023 charity fundraisers benefited Elf Louise.

== History ==
Due to venue issues, the first three day San Japan in July 2007 couldn't occur as planned. The first San Japan instead was held in various locations on the campus of Our Lady of the Lake University in 2007, benefiting the OLLU Anime Club and the Congregation of Divine Providence. San Japan moved to El Tropicano Riverwalk Hotel (El Tropicano Holiday Inn) and San Antonio Municipal Auditorium in 2008, along with expanding to three days. The convention moved to the San Antonio Marriott Rivercenter in 2010, would leave after 2011, and move to the Henry B. Gonzalez Convention Center. The San Antonio Grand Hyatt Hotel changed its elevator policy prior to the 2015 convention and began to limit access via a wristband system.

San Japan used additional space in the expanded Henry B. Gonzalez Convention Center, having 100,000 square feet for vendors and 40,000 for gaming in 2016. They also clarified convention policy that no firearms are allowed at the event despite the passage of Texas law HB 910 allowing open carry. San Japan in 2017 was held only a few days after Hurricane Harvey affected Texas. The convention in 2019 announced it would be held at the Henry B. Gonzalez Convention Center until at least 2026. In June 2020, the convention's chairman apologized and later resigned due to comments made about people of color. San Japan 2020 was cancelled due to the COVID-19 pandemic. A virtual event was held in its place during the month of September, in a Minecraft recreation of the convention center that was built by the San Antonio Phantoms.

The 2021 event had a attendance cap of 10,000, with mask and vaccination or heath assessment requirements. A cosplayer was arrested for making a bomb threat against the Gamer Supps energy drink stand during the 2025 convention.

=== Event history ===
Event name & Date	Venue & Location	Attendance	Convention Guests
November 10, 2007	Our Lady of the Lake University; San Antonio, Texas	815	Amelie Belcher, The Gear Project, Jessie James Grelle, Samantha Inoue-Harte, The Snags, Team Sugoi, and Larissa Wolcott.
August 8–10, 2008	San Antonio Municipal Auditorium; San Antonio, Texas	3,523	Mr. 3000, Hannah Alcorn, DM Ashura, Christopher Ayres, Amelie Belcher, CapsuleCorp, Daniel Cloud, Patrick Delahanty, DugFinn, Tiffany Grant, Jessie James Grelle, Samantha Inoue-Harte, Lord Katsuhiko Jinnai, Knuckle Sandwich, Maja, Vic Mignogna, Carli Mosier, Alissa Simmons, Smile.dk, and Amanda Tomasch.
August 14–16, 2009	San Antonio Municipal Auditorium; San Antonio, Texas	4,003	Mr. 3000, Christopher Ayres, Laura Bailey, Troy Baker, Amelie Belcher, CapsuleCorp, Daniel Cloud, DugFinn, Jessie James Grelle, Clarine Harp, Kyle Hebert, Samantha Inoue-Harte, Lord Katsuhiko Jinnai, Jonathan Joss, L33tStr33t Boys, Stacey Lee, Mega Ran, NeRiMa, OverClocked ReMix, Fred Perry, Wendy Powell, Carrie Savage, Alissa Simmons, Travis Willingham, Tadahisa Yoshida, and ZeaLouS1.
July 9–11, 2010	San Antonio Marriott Rivercenter; San Antonio, Texas	5,049	Mr. 3000, Tina Anderson, Christopher Ayres, Greg Ayres, Amelie Belcher, DugFinn, Jessie James Grelle, Clarine Harp, Jonathan Joss, Keshiki, Maja, Randy Milholland, NeRiMa, The Protomen, Carrie Savage, Michael Sinterniklaas, Micah Solusod, and We *Heart* Card Games Productions.
August 5–7, 2011	San Antonio Marriott Rivercenter; San Antonio, Texas	6,891	Airship Isabella, Christopher Ayres, Amelie Belcher, Descendants of Erdrick, Caitlin Glass, Jessie James Grelle, Arin Hanson, Rai Kamishiro, Bryan Massey, Carli Mosier, NeRiMa, Brad Swaile, J. Michael Tatum, Chris "PRGuitarman" Torres, TWABI Productions, Shinichi Watanabe, We *Heart* Card Games Productions, and Greg Wicker.
August 10–12, 2012	Henry B. Gonzalez Convention Center; San Antonio Grand Hyatt Hotel; San Antonio, Texas	9,464	Airship Isabella, Christopher Ayres, Amelie Belcher, Bea Billany, Diana "Hanyaan" Divine, Kara Edwards, Emirain, Caitlin Glass, Jessie James Grelle, Arin Hanson, Clarine Harp, John Patrick Lowrie, Ellen McLain, Carli Mosier, David "Docjazz4" Ramos, Christopher Sabat, Carrie Savage, The Slants, Sleeping Samurai, Ciarán Strange, and Greg Wicker.
August 16–18, 2013	Henry B. Gonzalez Convention Center; San Antonio Grand Hyatt Hotel; San Antonio, Texas	11,077	Christopher Ayres, Amelie Belcher, Bea Billany, Johnny Yong Bosch, Richie Branson, Eyeshine, Scott Freeman, Max Gilardi, Jerry Jewell, Sifu Kisu, Lanie Labens, Scott McNeil, Carli Mosier, David "Docjazz4" Ramos, Carrie Savage, Sleeping Samurai, Ciarán Strange, Karen Strassman, Katie Tiedrich, and Greg Wicker.
July 18–20, 2014	Henry B. Gonzalez Convention Center; San Antonio Grand Hyatt Hotel; San Antonio, Texas	14,686	Curtis Arnott, Christopher Ayres, Amelie Belcher, Bea Billany, Mr. Creepy Pasta, Florida Whammy Entertainment, Scott Frerichs, HamletMachine, Lauren Landa, Nick Landis, Mary Elizabeth McGlynn, Matthew Mercer, Lisa Ortiz, Powerglove, David "Docjazz4" Ramos, Lawrence Simpson, Sleeping Samurai, Ciarán Strange, Uncle Yo, Fred Wood, and Akira Yamaoka.
July 31-August 2, 2015	Henry B. Gonzalez Convention Center; San Antonio Grand Hyatt Hotel; San Antonio Marriott Riverwalk; San Antonio, Texas	18,411	Curtis Arnott, Amelie Belcher, Steve Blum, Richie Branson, Jessica Calvello, Svetlana Chmakova, Forrest Cobb, Mr. Creepy Pasta, DJ Cutman, Taylor Davis, Patrick Delahanty, Descendants of Erdrick, Los Ferrand, Scott Frerichs, Gimmick!, Fumiko Kawamura, Mitsuru "Mick" Kouzai, Nick Landis, Lone Stars, Yuji Matsukura, Mary Elizabeth McGlynn, Mega Ran, Lisa Ortiz, Professor Shyguy, David "Docjazz4" Ramos, The Returners, Lawrence Simpson, Ciarán Strange, Vitamin H Productions, Brett Weaver, Greg Wicker, Fred Wood, and Yuka.
September 2–4, 2016	Henry B. Gonzalez Convention Center; San Antonio Grand Hyatt Hotel; San Antonio Marriott Riverwalk; San Antonio, Texas	16,346	Curtis Arnott, Amelie Belcher, Bitforce, Kira Buckland, Forrest Cobb, Mr. Creepy Pasta, Ben Creighton, dj-Jo, Los Ferrand, Scott Frerichs, Yumi Fujiwara, Baylee Jae, Michele Knotz, Nick Landis, Lone Stars, Daman Mills, Masayoshi Minoshima, Mint, NateWantsToBattle, Lisa Ortiz, David "Docjazz4" Ramos, ROOKiEZ is PUNK'D, Anthony Sardinha, Stephanie Sheh, Ciarán Strange, Corinne Sudberg, Kirk Thornton, Vitamin H Productions, and Fred Wood.
September 1–3, 2017	Henry B. Gonzalez Convention Center; San Antonio Grand Hyatt Hotel; San Antonio, Texas	17,003	All Off, CapsuleCorp, Ray Chase, Mr. Creepy Pasta, CreepyPastaJr, Ben Creighton, Crusher-P, Robbie Daymond, Scott Frerichs, Haruka Kurebayashi, Nick Landis, Matthew Lassiter, The Living Tombstone, April Martin, Kyle McCarley, MissShadowLovely, Max Mittelman, Naoshi Mizuta, Myuu, A New World, Chris Patton, Genevieve Simmons, Juliet Simmons, Grant Smith, Kirran Somerlade, Ciarán Strange, Kaiji Tang, TeddyLoid, Vedetta Marie, Vitamin H Productions, Greg Wicker, and Lara Woodhull.
August 31-September 2, 2018	Henry B. Gonzalez Convention Center; San Antonio Grand Hyatt Hotel; San Antonio Marriott Riverwalk; San Antonio, Texas	18,540	AlpacaAsh, SungWon Cho, Mr. Creepy Pasta, Ben Creighton, DAGames, Deadlift Lolita, Scott Frerichs, Ghost Data, Grimecraft, Kohei Hattori, Natalie Rose Hoover, Caleb Hyles, DJ Hype Girl, Kanae Ito, Kyle Jones, Mikaela Krantz, Brittany Lauda, Andrew Love, Joel McDonald, Myuu, OR3O, RichaadEB, Jad Saxton, Juliet Simmons, Lawrence Simpson, W.T. Snacks, Kazuhiro Soeta, Kirran Somerlade, Ciarán Strange, TiA, and Vitamin H Production.
August 30-September 1, 2019	Henry B. Gonzalez Convention Center; San Antonio Grand Hyatt Hotel; San Antonio, Texas	20,107	Bryson Baugus, Justin Briner, Nobutoshi Canna, Clifford Chapin, Luci Christian, Mr. Creepy Pasta, Do As Infinity (D-A-I), Scott Frerichs, Chloé Hollings, Caleb Hyles, Nick Landis, Toshio Maeda, Myuu, Shihori Nakane, Paul Nakauchi, Lisa Ortiz, Sarcasm-himé, Matilda Smedius, Grant Smith, Kirran Somerlade, The Triforce Quartet, Vitamin H Productions, Gareth West, and Elise Zhang.
September 3-5, 2021	Henry B. Gonzalez Convention Center; San Antonio Grand Hyatt Hotel; San Antonio, Texas		Jules Conroy, Mr. Creepy Pasta, Khoi Dao, Adriana Figueroa, Scott Frerichs, Chris Hackney, Caleb Hyles, Nick Landis, Amanda "AmaLee" Lee, Mason Lieberman, Xander Mobus, and Laura Stahl.
September 2-4, 2022	Henry B. Gonzalez Convention Center; San Antonio, Texas	21,149	Gabriel "Black Gryph0n" Brown, Griffin Burns, Jessica Calvello, Claire Margaret Corlett, Mr. Creepy Pasta, Caleb Hyles, Emi Lo, Myuu, Aaron Roberts, Zeno Robinson, Rustage, Oscar Seung, TeddyLoid, and Austin Tindle.
September 1-3, 2023	Henry B. Gonzalez Convention Center; San Antonio, Texas	24,027	Jon Allen, Leraldo Anzaldua, BPM15Q, Dante Carver, Demondice, Ricco Fajardo, Jessica Gee-George, Grant George, Brian Holder, Caleb Hyles, Shinichiro Ishikawa, Arthell Isom, Hiroshi Kanatani, James Larabee, Bryan Massey, NipahDUBS, Molly Searcy, Moe Shop, Stardust Megu, Fred Tatasciore, TeddyLoid, Eric Vale, A.K. Wirru, and Jonathan Young.
August 30 - September 1, 2024	Henry B. Gonzalez Convention Center; San Antonio Grand Hyatt Hotel; San Antonio, Texas	28,033	Hakos Baelz, Burnout Syndromes, Bill Butts, ChibiTifa, Charlet Chung, Lucien Dodge, David Eddings, Doug Erholtz, Toshio Furukawa, Heather Gonzalez, Chigusa Kiyota, Rino Kodama, Nicholas Leung, Erica Mendez, Shin-ichiro Miki, Cassandra Lee Morris, Hiroshi Nagahama, Nerds Know, Masahiko Otsuka, Cindy Robinson, Shuzo John Shiota, Keith Silverstein, Christopher Corey Smith, Eiko Tanaka, Cory Yee, and Caleb Yen.
August 29-31, 2025	Henry B. Gonzalez Convention Center; San Antonio Grand Hyatt Hotel; San Antonio, Texas	32,073	Ash Da Hero, Miura Ayme, Beku Cos, Tiana Camacho, Aaron Campbell, Jason Douglas, Bradley Gareth, Katelyn Gault, Adam Gibbs, Damien Haas, Katsuhiro Harada, Ray Hurd, The Kamikaze Snowmen, Naoki Maeda, Kenji Nojima, Miho Okasaki, Nozomu Sasaki, Jonah Scott, Molly Searcy, Christopher Corey Smith, Naoko Tsutsumi, Sarah Anne Williams, and Yoh Yoshinari.
September 4-6, 2026	Henry B. Gonzalez Convention Center; San Antonio Grand Hyatt Hotel; San Antonio, Texas	37,785	Felecia Angelle, Yuko Ashizawa, Brian Beacock, Beanandcheese.burrito, Drew Breedlove, Richard Epcar, Shawn Gann, Kellen Goff, Ironmouse, Takushi Koide, Courtney Lin, Risa Mei, Atelier Pierrot, Cindy Robinson, Christopher Corey Smith, Roger Craig Smith, Michael Sorich, Dan Southworth, Spike Spencer, Patricia Summersett, Yoko Takahashi, Shiori Tani, Cristina Vee, David Vincent, Vye, Joshua Waters, Suzie Yeung, and Molly Zhang.
September 3-5, 2027	Henry B. Gonzalez Convention Center; San Antonio, Texas		
September 1-3, 2028	Henry B. Gonzalez Convention Center; San Antonio, Texas		
August 31 - September 2, 2029	Henry B. Gonzalez Convention Center; San Antonio, Texas		
August 30 - September 1, 2030	Henry B. Gonzalez Convention Center; San Antonio, Texas		
