= Super Catboy =

2023 video game

- Developer: Pixelpogo
- Publisher: Assemble Entertainment
- Designer: Arthur Eckmann
- Artist: Thomas Flachs
- Composers: Thomas Flachs, Anton Corazza, Stemage, Yusef Kelliebrew
- Engine: GameMaker
- Platforms: Windows, macOS
- Release: July 24, 2023
- Genre: Platformer
- Mode: Single-player

Super Catboy is a 2023 platformer developed by German studio Pixelpogo for Windows and macOS. The player takes on the role of the eponymous anthropomorphic cat, facing other animalistic characters in order to defeat the evil Dr. Ungefug.

== Gameplay ==
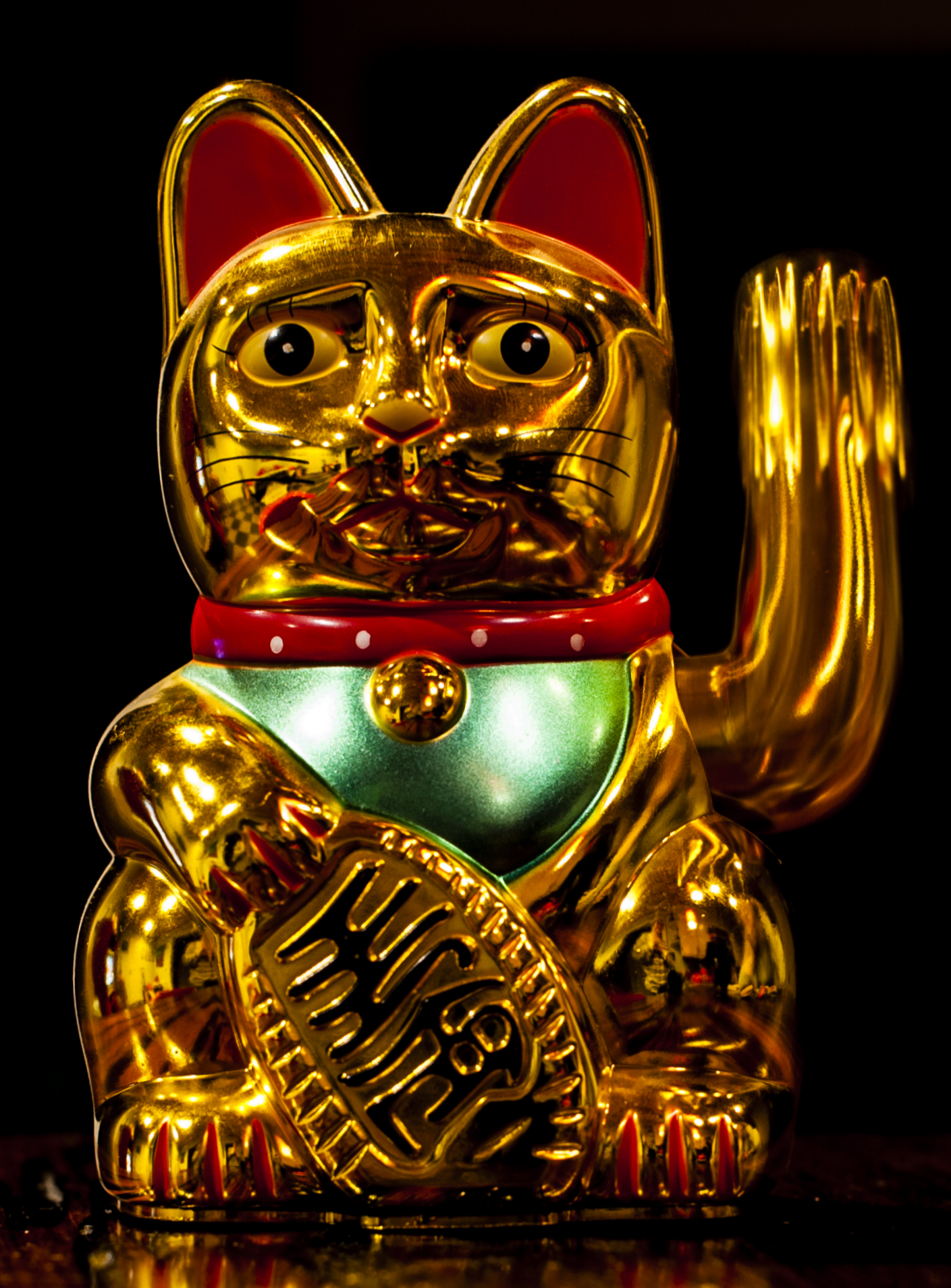
The game's levels feature collectible Maneki-neko fragments.

Super Catboy is a platformer which also draws on elements from beat 'em up and run and gun genres. It pays homage to 16 bit titles including Mega Man X, Metal Slug and Donkey Kong Country. The levels gradually expand in complexity, introducing mechanics such as rope climbing. The levels include collectible food, ammunition, coins and pieces of Maneki-neko statues. Gathering four pieces awards an additional life. The game is short, only a few hours in length.

Special weapons can be collected temporarily during levels, but are dropped quickly, and the player can also quickly dash in either direction using the shoulder buttons. Some stages feature unique mechanics, such as a bike chase sequence and a mine cart riding segment.

== Plot ==
Catboy is experimented on by the evil Dr. Ungefug, but escapes when the aircraft carrying his pod crashes. He teams up with Weapongirl, a "slightly deranged" girl who carries an arsenal of weapons. She gives a pistol to Catboy, along with the dash shoes, and the pair team up to defeat Dr. Ungefug. Along the way he also encounters Catgirl, Ungefug's bodyguard and his rival.

== Development ==
Developer Pixelpogo is based in Germany. In an interview, the project's designer Arthur Eckmann discussed the game's inspiration. During his teenage years he was fond of Mega Man X, and wanted to build a new platformer which incorporated the beat 'em up mechanics of Turtles in Time and Double Dragon. Although he was already creating games and prototypes using RPG Maker 2000 and GameMaker, he lacked the confidence to implement his childhood idea at that time. Years later, he returned to the idea and successfully brought it to life as the debut title of his newly founded studio.

Development on the title began in 2017. The character of Catboy was initially more humanoid, but became more feline and cartoony later on. The game was delayed several times over the course of development, being initially earmarked for a fall 2021 release. In November that year it was delayed to Spring 2022, with the announcement accompanied by a new trailer. A four level demo was released in February 2022 as part of Steam Next Fest. The game would ultimately launch in July 2023. A soundtrack album was released on August 4 via Bandcamp.

== Reception ==
The 2022 demo was received positively, with Comic Book Resources describing it as "purrfect", and nodding in particular to the game's visual aesthetics and music. The game's full launch was also received positively overall. Some criticism was directed at uneven difficulty and the fact that special weapons are dropped immediately upon jumping or using a melee attack, which limits their usefulness.
