= Danimal Cannon =

American musician

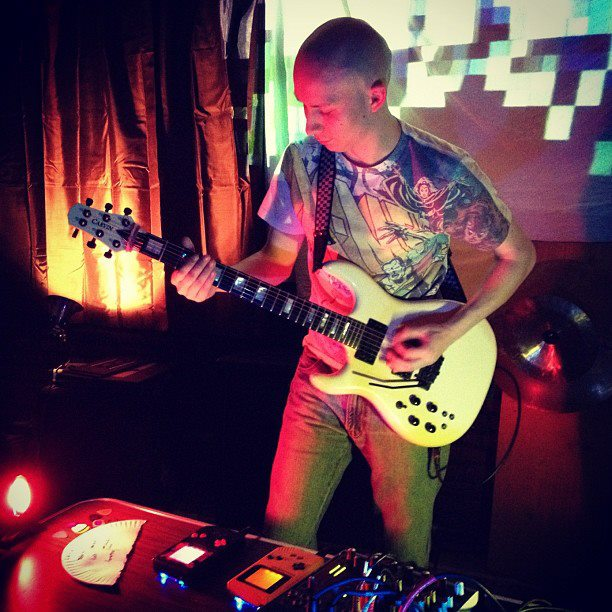
- Danimal Cannon performing in 2012

Background information
- Born: March 11, 1983 (age 42)
- Origin: Buffalo, New York, United States
- Genres: Chiptune, video game music
- Instrument(s): Guitar, Game Boy
- Years active: 2008–present
- Website: danimalcannon.com

Daniel Behrens (born March 11, 1983), better known by his stage name Danimal Cannon, is an American video game composer and chiptune music performer. He is most known for combining guitar playing with Game Boy music. He is also known for his presentations on chipmusic, having hosted panels at Penny Arcade Expo, YouTube tutorials, a TEDx Talk, and a Game Boy masterclass workshop at Blip Festival 2012.

His album releases have been licensed for several games, including 8BitMMO, Wave Wave, and Just Shapes & Beats.

== Discography ==
=== Studio albums ===
- The Power Cosmic (2011) (only available on the Player vs Performer Tour)
- Roots (2012)
- Parallel Processing (with Zef) (2013)
- Lunaria (2016)

==== Game soundtracks ====
- Surfing Tsunami (2012)
- Build a Zombie (2012)
- Cursor Curse (2013)
- Rocket Fizz CandyCade (2013)
- Wave Wave (2014) (licensed from Parallel Processing)
- 8bit MMO (2014) (licensed from Roots and Parallel Processing)
- Proton Pulse (2014)
- JumpJet Rex (2015)
- Apocolypse Baseball (2015)
- Chip Beat Blaster (2015)
- Bounty Hackers (2016)
- Vanguard V (2016)
- Starr Mazer (2016)
- Mighty No. 9 (2016)
- Just Shapes & Beats (2018) (licensed from Parallel Processing)
- RetroMania Wrestling (2021)

==== Armcannon ====
- Legvacuum (2008)
- The Return Of The Attack Of The Legend Of Pizzor (2009)
- Legvacuum 2 (2013)

==== Metroid Metal ====
- Varia Suite (2009)
- Expansion Pack EP (2010)
- Other Album (2014)

==== Weaponex ====
- Nuclear Winter EP (2012)

==== Compilations ====
- Chiptunes = Win Volume 1 (2012)
- Rochester Chip Fest 2012 (2013)
- World 1–2 (2013)
- MAGfest = Win (2014)
- Format.DF (2014)

==== Guest appearances ====
- Stemage – Frets of Valmar: Grandia II (2011)
- C-Jeff – Preschtale (2012)
- Minecraft: The Story of Mojang Soundtrack (2012)
- Mega Man 25th Anniversary – For Everlasting Peace (2013)
- C-Jeff – Big Steel Wheels (2013)
- Joshua Morse – Vlad II (2015)

== Video game remixes ==
Danimal Cannon honed his production skills and knowledge of old video game consoles by remixing video game music. His work has been featured on sites like OverClocked ReMix and Dwelling of Duels. He also performs remixes of video game music with his other bands Armcannon and Metroid Metal.

- The Bad Dudes – No Balls, No Glory (2008)
- The Bad Dudes – Chronotorious (2009)
- The Bad Dudes – Jingle All The Way (2009)
- Contra 4 – Rocked 'n' Loaded (2010)
- The Bad Dudes and OverClocked Remix – Heroes Vs Villains (2011)
- Shovel Knight - Strike The Earth! – Just Shapes & Beats (Just Shovels and Knights DLC) (2020)
