= Chromelodeon =

American indie rock band

Chromelodeon are an 8-piece indie rock band from Philadelphia, Pennsylvania. They are known for their live shows (which have been described as "visceral") as well as their unique instrumental sound. Their music is achieved by utilizing a combination of synthesizers and traditional instruments from guitars to accordions. Additionally, the band's body of work consists both of original songs and instrumental rock covers of video game music.

== History ==
The band was formed by eight friends from high school in 2000. The following year, their first full-length album was released, In the Year 20XX, which opens with a cover of "Wily's Castle" from the Nintendo Entertainment System game Mega Man 3, and is followed by 3 originals; the last track, "Eloquence is Dead," spans 13+ minutes.

Two other albums came out in 2005. The band's second release was made up solely from covers of the background music themes from the video game Ninja Gaiden II. This was followed by the completely original Heart of Sawdust album which consisted of six untitled tracks.

=== Sprite Slowdown ===
Sprite Slowdown was established in 2005 as a side project to allow Chromelodeon to differentiate between their original work and their video game covers. It is a band consisting of the same members as Chromelodeon, but whose repertoire consists only of video game covers. Sprite Slowdown released a full length in 2005, and a 5-song EP in 2007.

=== The end of Chromelodeon ===
The band held their final performance on April 27, 2007, at the First Unitarian Church of Philadelphia in Philadelphia, Pennsylvania, with other Philadelphia bands Hail Social and The Private Sea. At the show, they released a limited run of 100 copies of their final album, which consisted of all the previously unreleased original material that Chromelodeon performed live since the summer of 2005. The album has since been made available to download for free.

The band played a reunion show at MAGFest 2019.

== Releases ==
=== As Chromelodeon ===
- Adventures in a Haunted House EP (2001)
- In the Year 20XX (2003)
- Ninja Gaiden 2: The Dark Sword of Chaos (Bloodlink Records, 2005)
- Heart of Sawdust (Bloodlink Records, 2005)
- The Final Recordings (2007)

=== As Sprite Slowdown ===
- Sprite Slowdown (2005)
- Untitled Second Sprite Slowdown EP (2007)
