= You Bred Raptors? =

American post-rock trio

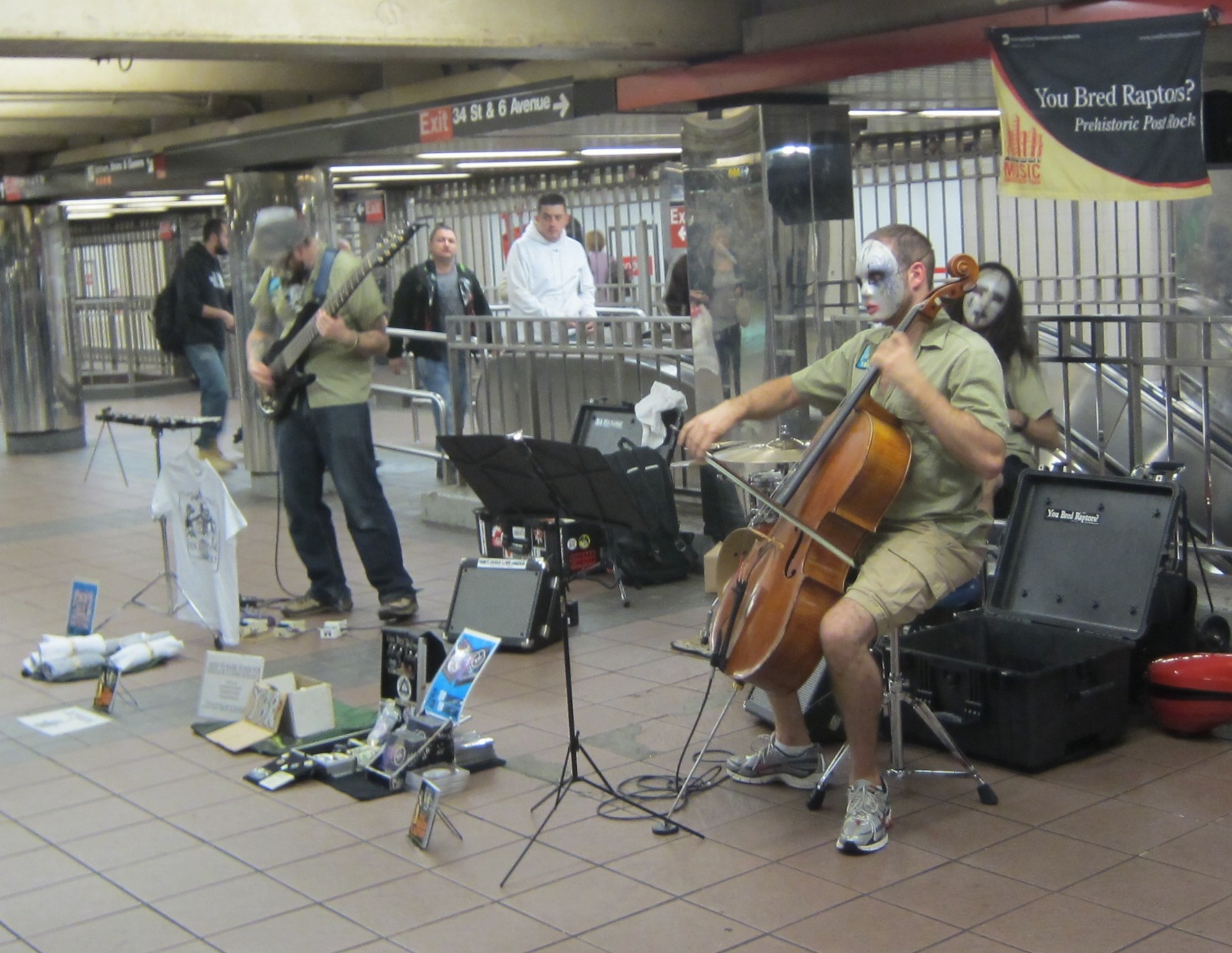
- You Bred Raptors? in 2012

Background information
- Origin: Astoria, New York, United States
- Genres: Post-rock
- Years active: 2010–Present
- Members: Peter Rains, Tara Hanish, Danny Sher
- Website: youbredraptors.com

You Bred Raptors? is an American post-rock trio based in Astoria, New York and is composed of Peter Rains (8-string electric bass and glockenspiel), Tara Hanish (cello), and Danny Sher (drums and glockenspiel). They have recorded four albums and make a living busking under the streets of New York City as part of Music Under New York. They have been featured in New York Magazine, The Economist, and The Atlantic.

== History ==
Formed by Rains in 2010, the band originally consisted of only bass and drums. A month after its inception, You Bred Raptors? successfully auditioned for the Music Under New York Program, allowing them to perform in subway stations across New York City. The band's name is inspired by the iconic line from Jurassic Park and each of their albums is named after a character from the movie. The group always performs with a variety of masks, including SWAT Team, Mexican wrestling, and Venetian masks.

In 2011, determined to expand the sound of the band, Rains added cellist, Bryan Wilson, after posting an ad for a string player on Craigslist. You Bred Raptors? released their third album, Hammond, in 2012, which was recorded, mixed, and mastered by Colin Marston. The band released, Grant, in 2014, which heavily features the collaborative songwriting of both Rains and Wilson.

== Musical style ==
The music of You Bred Raptors? is all instrumental and the songs have a heavy, post-rock, experimental, film score-like sound. Rains is endorsed by Conklin Guitars and performs with a custom made 8 string electric bass, which provides a wide pitch range for composition.

=== Albums ===
- Muldoon - 2011
- Hammond - 2012
- Grant - 2014
- International Genetics - 2017
- Lysine - 2023

=== EPs ===
- Lex and Tim - 2010
